= 2016 Hull Kingston Rovers season =

English rugby league team season

Hull Kingston Rovers 2016 season
- Super League XXI Rank: 11th
- Play-off result: Did not qualify
- Challenge Cup: Fifth Round
- 2016 record: Wins: 6; draws: 2; losses: 16
- Points scored: For: 235; against: 143

Team information
- Chairman: Neil Hudgell
- Head Coach: Chris Chester (until Round 3); Willie Poching (Rounds 4 and 5); James Webster (after Round 5)
- Captain: Graeme Horne
- Stadium: Craven Park
- Avg. attendance: 7,750
- High attendance: 11,050 (against Hull F.C.)

Top scorers
- Tries: Thomas Minns (20)
- Goals: Josh Mantellato (58)
- Points: Josh Mantellato (148)
← 2015	List of seasons	2017 →

The 2016 season was Hull Kingston Rovers' tenth consecutive season playing in England's top division of rugby league. During the season, they competed in the 2016 Super League season and the 2016 Challenge Cup.

== Preseason friendlies ==
Date and time	Versus	H/A	Venue	Result	Score	Tries	Goals	Attendance	Report
25 January; 15:00	Hull F.C.	A	KCOM Stadium	L	20–60	Dixon (2), Mantellato		8,962	

== Super League ==
=== Fixtures ===
Date and time	Round	Versus	H/A	Venue	Result	Score	Tries	Goals	Attendance	Pos.	Report
7 February, 15:00	Round 1	Castleford Tigers	H	Craven Park	D	16–16	Mantellato (2), Donaldson	Mantellato (2/3)	11,011	8th	
14 February, 15:00	Round 2	Warrington Wolves	A	Halliwell Jones Stadium	L	8–38	Thornley, Dixon	Dixon (0/1), Kelly (0/1)	11,037	9th	
21 February, 15:00 (Note: Following this fixture, head coach Chris Chester was sacked and replaced by assistant coach Willie Poching for the next two rounds.)	Round 3	Wakefield Trinity Wildcats	H	Craven Park	L	12–14	Dixon, Walker, Sio	Dixon (0/2), Shaw (0/1)	7,207	9th	
26 February, 20:00	Round 4	St. Helens	H	Craven Park	L	22–31	Cockayne, Blair, Green, Shaw	Shaw (3/4)	6,517	10th	
4 March, 20:00 (Note: Following this fixture, James Webster was appointed as interim head coach for the remainder of the season.)	Round 5	Widnes Vikings	A	Halton Stadium	L	16–30	Blair, Minns, Shaw	Shaw (2/3)	6,517	11th	
13 March, 15:00	Round 6	Huddersfield Giants	A	Kirklees Stadium	L	6–38	Minns	Shaw (1/1)	5,610	12th	
20 March, 15:00	Round 7	Salford Red Devils	H	Craven Park	W	44–30	Blair, Thornley, Horne, Sio, Greenwood, Shaw, Marsh	Mantellato (8/8)	6,593	10th	
25 March, 12:45 (Good Friday)	Round 8	Hull F.C.	H	Craven Park	L	20–22	Shaw, Sio, Thornley	Mantellato (2/3 + 2 pen.)	11,050	11th	
28 March, 20:00	Round 9	Wigan Warriors	A	DW Stadium	L	16–30	Thornley (2), Horne	Dixon (2/3)	11,268	10th	
1 April, 20:00	Round 10	Leeds Rhinos	A	Headingley Rugby Stadium	W	30–10	Lunt (2), Dixon, Cockayne, Allgood, Mulhern	Dixon (2/4), Cockayne (1/1)	15,384	10th	
7 April, 20:00	Round 11	Catalans Dragons	H	Craven Park	L	0–40			6,764	10th	
24 April, 15:30	Round 12	Castleford Tigers	A	Wheldon Road	W	58–16	Minns (3), Thornley (2), Sio (2), Blair, Kelly, Horne, Allgood	Cockayne (7/11)	7,106	10th	
30 April, 15:00	Round 13	Salford Red Devils	A	AJ Bell Stadium	L	26–44	Minns (2), Blair, Thornley, Sio	Sio (2/5), Blair (1/5)	3,048	10th	
15 May, 15:00	Round 14	Widnes Vikings	H	Craven Park	W	24–10	Lunt, Sio, Greenwood, Kelly	Cockayne (4/4)	7,506	10th	
22 May; 17:30 (Magic Weekend)	Round 15	Hull F.C.	N	St James' Park	L	16–28	Lunt, Horne	Terry Campese (2/2 + 2 pen.)	28,945	10th	
28 May; 17:00 (BST)	Round 16	Catalans Dragons	A	Stade Gilbert Brutus	L	16–34	Larroyer, Wardill, Sio	Sio (2/3), Kelly (1/1)	9,859	10th	
2 June; 20:00	Round 17	Wakefield Trinity Wildcats	A	Belle Vue	W	54–16	Dixon (3), Kelly (2), Greenwood (2), Lunt, Green, Blair	Sio (7/10)	5,082	10th	
10 June; 20:00	Round 18	Wigan Warriors	H	Craven Park	L	18–20	Kelly, Minns, Allgood	Sio (3/3)	7,507	10th	
17 June; 20:00	Round 19	St Helens	A	Langtree Park	L	16–48	Lunt, Clarkson, Minns	Dixon (2/3)	9,488	11th	
1 July; 20:00	Round 20	Warrington Wolves	H	Craven Park	D	16–16	Donaldson, Minns, Thornley	Cockayne (2/3)	6,827	11th	
8 July; 20:00	Round 21	Huddersfield Giants	H	Craven Park	W	20–19	Marsh, Kelly, Lawler	Cockayne (3/3 + 1 pen.)	6,434	10th	
14 July; 20:00	Round 22	Hull F.C.	A	KCOM Stadium	L	12–36	Walker, Thornley	Mantellato (2/2)	17,481	10th	
21 July; 20:00	Round 23	Leeds Rhinos	H	Craven Park	L	20–24	Marsh, Blair, Sio, Dixon	Mantellato (2/3)	8,109	11th	

=== Table ===
Pos	Team	Pld	W	D	L	PF	PA	PD	Pts	Qualification
1	Hull F.C.	23	17	0	6	605	465	+140	34	Super League Super 8s
2	Warrington Wolves	23	16	1	6	675	425	+250	33	Super League Super 8s
3	Wigan Warriors	23	16	0	7	455	440	+15	32	Super League Super 8s
4	St Helens	23	14	0	9	573	536	+37	28	Super League Super 8s
5	Catalans Dragons	23	13	0	10	593	505	+88	26	Super League Super 8s
6	Castleford Tigers	23	10	1	12	617	640	−23	21	Super League Super 8s
7	Widnes Vikings	23	10	0	13	499	474	+25	20	Super League Super 8s
8	Wakefield Trinity Wildcats	23	10	0	13	485	654	−169	20	Super League Super 8s
9	Leeds Rhinos	23	8	0	15	404	576	−172	16	The Qualifiers
10	Salford Red Devils	23	10	0	13	560	569	−9	14 (Note: Salford deducted 6 points for salary cap breaches in 2014 and 2015.)	The Qualifiers
11	Hull Kingston Rovers	23	6	2	15	486	610	−124	14	The Qualifiers
12	Huddersfield Giants	23	6	0	17	511	569	−58	12	The Qualifiers

Source: Rugby League Project
Rules for classification: 1) Points; 2) Points difference; 3) Number of points scored;

== The Qualifiers ==
Date and time	Round	Versus	H/A	Venue	Result	Score	Tries	Goals	Attendance	Pos.	Report
7 August, 15:00	Q1	Batley Bulldogs	H	Craven Park	W	58–18	Minns (3), Greenwood (2), Thornley, Marsh, Cockayne, Blair, Mantellato	Mantellato (9/11)	6,684		
12 August, 20:00	Q2	Leeds Rhinos	A	Headingley Rugby Stadium	L	18–22	Greenwood, Donaldson, Lawler	Mantellato (3/3)	14,180		
19 August, 20:00	Q3	Salford Red Devils	A	AJ Bell Stadium	W	29–12	Mantellato, Greenwood, Sio, Minns	Mantellato (6/6 + 2 pen.); Drop-goals: Kelly	2,074		
3 September, 15:00	Q4	Leigh Centurions	H	Craven Park	L	18–25	Sio, Mantellato, Marsh	Mantellato (3/3)	7,363		
11 September, 15:00	Q5	London Broncos	A	Trailfinders Sports Ground	W	58–18	Minns (3), Marsh (2), Cockayne, Dixon, Greenwood, Donaldson, Jubb	Mantellato (9/10)	1,215		
18 September, 15:00	Q6	Featherstone Rovers	A	Post Office Road	W	32–24	Mantellato (2), Minns (2), Lunt, Greenwood	Mantellato (4/6)	4,034		
24 September, 12:30	Q7	Huddersfield Giants	H	Craven Park	L	22–23	Blair, Sio, Allgood, Thornley	Mantellato (3/4)	8,024		

=== Million Pound Game ===
Date and time	Versus	H/A	Venue	Result	Score	Tries	Goals	Attendance	Report
1 October, 15:00	Salford Red Devils	H	Craven Park	L	18–19 (g.p.)	Walker, Mantellato, Minns	Mantellato (3/3)	6,562	

This match resulted in Hull Kingston Rovers' relegation from the Super League after ten consecutive years into the RFL Championship. Following Gareth O'Brien's match-winning drop goal, a pitch invasion took place that resulted in fighting between fans and stewards that eventually required police intervention. Following a RFL investigation, in February 2017, Hull Kingston Rovers were fined £25,000 (£20,000 suspended) after the RFL found the club guilty of breaking ground safety rules and failing to control their supporters.

=== Table ===
Pos	Team	Pld	W	D	L	PF	PA	PD	Pts	Qualification
1	Leeds Rhinos	7	6	0	1	239	94	+145	12	2017 Super League
2	Leigh Centurions (P)	7	6	0	1	223	193	+30	12	2017 Super League
3	Huddersfield Giants	7	5	0	2	257	166	+91	10	2017 Super League
4	Hull Kingston Rovers (R)	7	4	0	3	235	142	+93	8	Million Pound Game
5	Salford Red Devils	7	3	0	4	208	152	+56	6	Million Pound Game
6	London Broncos	7	3	0	4	221	212	+9	6	2017 Championship
7	Batley Bulldogs	7	1	0	6	111	318	−207	2	2017 Championship
8	Featherstone Rovers	7	0	0	7	96	313	−217	0	2017 Championship

Source: Rugby League Project
Rules for classification: 1) Points; 2) Points difference; 3) Number of points scored;
(P) Promoted; (R) Relegated

== Challenge Cup ==
Date and time	Round	Versus	H/A	Venue	Result	Score	Tries	Goals	Attendance	Report
16 April; 14:00	Round 5	Oldham Roughyeds	H	Craven Park	L	22–36	Tilse (2), Lunt, Blair, Wardill	Cockayne (1/4)	3,056	

== Transfers ==
=== Gains ===
Player	Club	Contract	Date
(England) Thomas Minns	Leeds Rhinos	3 Years	July 2015
(England) Iain Thornley	Wigan Warriors	2 Years	August 2015
(England) Shaun Lunt	Huddersfield Giants	4 Years	August 2015
(France) Kevin Larroyer	Catalans Dragons	3 Years	September 2015
(England) Chris Clarkson	Leeds Rhinos	3 Years	October 2015
(England) James Greenwood	Wigan Warriors	2 Years	October 2015
(England) Ryan Shaw	Bradford Bulls	2 Years	October 2015
(England) Robbie Mulhern	Leeds Rhinos	2 Years	December 2015
(England) Will Oakes	Wakefield Trinity Wildcats	2 Years	December 2015
(England) Jamie Peacock	Retirement		September 2016

=== Losses ===
Player	Club	Contract	Date
(Australia) Michael Weyman	N/A	Retirement	March 2015
(England) Keal Carlile	Sheffield Eagles	1 Year	March 2015
(England) Darrell Goulding	N/A	Retirement	June 2015
(England) Connor Robinson	Halifax R.L.F.C.	1 Year	July 2015
(Ireland) Tyrone McCarthy	St. George Illwarra Dragons	2 Years	September 2015
(England) Greg Burke	Wigan Warriors	End of loan	September 2015
(France) Dane Chisholm	Canterbury Bulldogs	End of loan	September 2015
(New Zealand) Tony Puletua	N/A	Retirement	September 2015
(Scotland) Sonny Esslemont	Keighley Cougars	1 Year	October 2015
(England) Josh Guzdek	Dewsbury Rams	1 Year	October 2015
(England) Jamie Langley	N/A	Retirement	October 2015
(England) Aaron Ollett	Keighley Cougars	1 Year	October 2015
(England) Macauley Hallett	Swinton Lions	1 Year	October 2015
(England) Kris Welham	Bradford Bulls	2 Years	November 2015
(England) Jordan Cox	Warrington Wolves	1 Year	November 2015

== Squad ==
2016 Hull Kingston Rovers Squad
First team squad			Coaching staff
1 (Australia) Ken Sio – FB (gk); 2 (Italy) Josh Mantellato – WG (gk); 3 (England) Liam Salter – CE; 4 (England) Iain Thornley – CE; 5 (England) Kieran Dixon – WG (gk); 6 (Italy) Terry Campese – SO; 7 (Australia) Albert Kelly – SH (gk); 8 (England) Adam Walker – PR; 9 (England) Shaun Lunt – HK; 10 (Australia) Mitchell Allgood – PR; 11 (Australia) Maurice Blair – SR (gk); 12 (Scotland) Graeme Horne (c) – SR	13 (England) Chris Clarkson – LF; 14 (France) Kevin Larroyer – SR; 15 (England) James Donaldson – LF; 16 (England) James Green – PR; 17 (Australia) Dane Tilse – PR; 18 (England) Ben Cockayne – WG (gk); 19 (France) John Boudebza – PR; 20 (England) James Greenwood – PR; 21 (England) Thomas Minns – CE; 22 (England) Matty Marsh – WG; 23 (England) Ryan Shaw – FB (gk); 24 (England) George Lawler – CE	25 (England) Steven Holker – LF; 26 (Ireland) Robbie Mulhern – PR; 27 (Scotland) Will Oakes – WG; 28 (Scotland) Keiran Moran – SR; 29 (England) Joe Wardill – SR; 30 (England) Joe Cator – SR; 31 (England) Will Jubb – HK; 33 (England) David Thompson – WG; 34 (England) Jamie Peacock – SR	Head coach: (Australia) James Webster (interim); Legend: (c) Captain(s); (vc) Vice-captain(s); (gk) = Goal kicker

=== Appearances ===
==== Super League ====
FB=Fullback	C=Centre	W=Winger	SO=Stand-off	SH=Scrum half	PR=Prop	H=Hooker	SR=Second Row	L=Loose forward	B=Bench

No	Player	1	2	11	3	4	5	6	7	8	9	10	12	13	14	15	16	17	18	19	20	21	22	23	S1	S2	S3	S4	S5	S6	S7	SF
1	Ken Sio	FB	W	W	W	W	W	W	W	C	x	x	x	x	x	x	x	x	x	x	x	x	x	x	x	x	x	x	x	x	x	x
2	Josh Mantellato	W						W	W		x	x	x	x	x	x	x	x	x	x	x	x	x	x	x	x	x	x	x	x	x	x
3	Liam Salter			C	C	C					x	x	x	x	x	x	x	x	x	x	x	x	x	x	x	x	x	x	x	x	x	x
4	Iain Thornley	C	C	C	C	C	C	C	C	C	x	x	x	x	x	x	x	x	x	x	x	x	x	x	x	x	x	x	x	x	x	x
5	Kieran Dixon		W	W						FB	x	x	x	x	x	x	x	x	x	x	x	x	x	x	x	x	x	x	x	x	x	x
6	Terry Campese						B				x	x	x	x	x	x	x	x	x	x	x	x	x	x	x	x	x	x	x	x	x	x
7	Albert Kelly	SH	SH	SH	SH				SH		x	x	x	x	x	x	x	x	x	x	x	x	x	x	x	x	x	x	x	x	x	x
8	Adam Walker	x	B	P	P	P	P	P	P	B	x	x	x	x	x	x	x	x	x	x	x	x	x	x	x	x	x	x	x	x	x	x
9	Shaun Lunt						H				x	x	x	x	x	x	x	x	x	x	x	x	x	x	x	x	x	x	x	x	x	x
10	Mitchell Allgood	P	L	L	L	L	L	L	L	L	x	x	x	x	x	x	x	x	x	x	x	x	x	x	x	x	x	x	x	x	x	x
11	Maurice Blair	SO	SO	SO	SO	SO	SO	SO	SO	SO	x	x	x	x	x	x	x	x	x	x	x	x	x	x	x	x	x	x	x	x	x	x
12	Graeme Horne	SR	SR	SR	SR		SR	SR	SR	SR	x	x	x	x	x	x	x	x	x	x	x	x	x	x	x	x	x	x	x	x	x	x
13	Chris Clarkson	SR	SR	SR	SR	SR	SR	SR	SR		x	x	x	x	x	x	x	x	x	x	x	x	x	x	x	x	x	x	x	x	x	x
14	Kevin Larroyer										x	x	x	x	x	x	x	x	x	x	x	x	x	x	x	x	x	x	x	x	x	x
15	James Donaldson	B	B								x	x	x	x	x	x	x	x	x	x	x	x	x	x	x	x	x	x	x	x	x	x
16	James Green	B	P	B	B		B	B	B		x	x	x	x	x	x	x	x	x	x	x	x	x	x	x	x	x	x	x	x	x	x
17	Dane Tilse	P	P	P	P	P	P	P	P	P	x	x	x	x	x	x	x	x	x	x	x	x	x	x	x	x	x	x	x	x	x	x
18	Ben Cockayne	W	FB	FB	FB	FB	FB	FB	FB		x	x	x	x	x	x	x	x	x	x	x	x	x	x	x	x	x	x	x	x	x	x
19	John Boudebza	B	Red card	Red card	Red card	Red card	B	B	B		x	x	x	x	x	x	x	x	x	x	x	x	x	x	x	x	x	x	x	x	x	x
20	James Greenwood	L		B	B	SR	B	B	B	SR	x	x	x	x	x	x	x	x	x	x	x	x	x	x	x	x	x	x	x	x	x	x
21	Thomas Minns	C	C			B	C				x	x	x	x	x	x	x	x	x	x	x	x	x	x	x	x	x	x	x	x	x	x
22	Matty Marsh	x	x	x	x	SH	SH	SH	x	SH	x	x	x	x	x	x	x	x	x	x	x	x	x	x	x	x	x	x	x	x	x	x
23	Ryan Shaw	x	x	B	W	W	W	C	C	W	x	x	x	x	x	x	x	x	x	x	x	x	x	x	x	x	x	x	x	x	x	x
24	George Lawler	H	H	H	H	H	x	H	H	H	x	x	x	x	x	x	x	x	x	x	x	x	x	x	x	x	x	x	x	x	x	x
25	Steven Holker	x	B	x	B	B	x	x	x	x	x	x	x	x	x	x	x	x	x	x	x	x	x	x	x	x	x	x	x	x	x	x
26	Robbie Mulhern	B	B	B	B	B		B	B	P	x	x	x	x	x	x	x	x	x	x	x	x	x	x	x	x	x	x	x	x	x	x
27	Will Oakes	x	x	x	x	x	x	x	x	W	x	x	x	x	x	x	x	x	x	x	x	x	x	x	x	x	x	x	x	x	x	x
28	Keiran Moran	x	x	x	x	B	x	x	x	B	x	x	x	x	x	x	x	x	x	x	x	x	x	x	x	x	x	x	x	x	x	x
29	Joe Wardill	x	x	x	x	x	x	x	x	B	x	x	x	x	x	x	x	x	x	x	x	x	x	x	x	x	x	x	x	x	x	x
30	Joe Cator	x	x	x	x	x	x	x	x	B	x	x	x	x	x	x	x	x	x	x	x	x	x	x	x	x	x	x	x	x	x	x

= Injured

= Suspended

==== Challenge Cup ====
FB=Fullback	C=Centre	W=Winger	SO=Stand Off	SH=Scrum half	P=Prop	H=Hooker	SR=Second Row	L=Loose forward	B=Bench

No	Player	5
1	Ken Sio	x
2	Josh Mantellato	x
3	Liam Salter	x
4	Iain Thornley	x
5	Kieran Dixon	x
6	Terry Campese	x
7	Albert Kelly	x
8	Adam Walker	x
9	Shaun Lunt	x
10	Mitchell Allgood	x
11	Maurice Blair	x
12	Graeme Horne	x
13	Chris Clarkson	x
14	Kevin Larroyer	x
15	James Donaldson	x
16	James Green	x
17	Dane Tilse	x
18	Ben Cockayne	x
19	John Boudebza	x
20	James Greenwood	x
21	Thomas Minns	x
22	Matty Marsh	x
23	Ryan Shaw	x
24	George Lawler	x
25	Steven Holker	x
26	Robbie Mulhern	x
27	Will Oakes	x
