= 2017 Hull Kingston Rovers season =

English rugby league team season

Hull Kingston Rovers 2017 season
- 2017 RFL Championship champions
- 2017 RFL Championship Rank: 1st
- Play-off result: 3rd
- Challenge Cup: Round 6
- 2017 record: Wins: 21; draws: 1; losses: 4
- Points scored: For: 850; against: 385

Team information
- Chairman: Neil Hudgell
- Head Coach: Tim Sheens
- Captain: Shaun Lunt
- Stadium: Craven Park
- Avg. attendance: 7,429
- High attendance: 8,817 (against Bradford Bulls)

Top scorers
- Tries: Ryan Shaw (9)
- Goals: Jamie Ellis (39)
- Points: Jamie Ellis (87)
← 2016	List of seasons	2018 →

The 2017 season was Hull Kingston Rovers' first and only consecutive season playing in England's second division of rugby league. During the season, they competed in the 2017 RFL Championship, securing immediate promotion back to the Super League, and the 2017 Challenge Cup.

Following the sacking of head coach Chris Chester during the 2016 season, Hull Kingston Rovers announced in September 2016 that former Australia national rugby league team and Wests Tigers coach Tim Sheens would be the club's head coach from the 2017 season onwards.

== Preseason friendlies ==
Date and time	Versus	H/A	Venue	Result	Score	Tries	Goals	Attendance	Report
8 January; 15:00	Hull F.C.	A	KCOM Stadium	W	40–16	Quinlan, Ellis, Addy, Hodgson, Heffernan, Oakes, Milton	(7/7)	Unknown	
20 January, 14:30	Leeds Rhinos	A	Headingley Rugby Stadium	L	4–30		(0/1)	Unknown	

== Championship ==
=== Fixtures ===
Date and time	Round	Versus	H/A	Venue	Result	Score	Tries	Goals	Attendance	Pos.	Report
5 February, 15:00	Round 1	Bradford Bulls	H	Craven Park	W	54–24	Heffernan (2), Scruton (2), Donaldson, Shaw, Greenwood, Ellis, Quinlan	Ellis (9/9)		3rd	
12 February, 15:00	Round 2	London Broncos	A	Trailfinders Sports Ground	W	28–22	Abdull, Ellis, Moss, Heffernan, Shaw	Ellis (4/5)		3rd	
19 February, 15:00	Round 3	Rochdale Hornets	A	Spotland Stadium	W	28–18	Minns (2), Moss, Heffernan, Lunt	Ellis (4/5)	2,012	1st	
26 February, 15:00	Round 4	Oldham R.L.F.C.	H	Craven Park	W	48–0	Minns (2), Lunt, Donaldson, Scruton, Abdull, Ellis, Moss	Ellis (8/8)		1st	
5 March, 15:00	Round 5	Sheffield Eagles	H	Craven Park	W	50–10	Donaldson (2), Cockayne, Heffernan, Minns, Quinlan, Clarkson, Abdull	Ellis (8/8 + 1 pen.)		1st	
12 March, 15:00	Round 6	Dewsbury Rams	A	Crown Flatt	W	48–6	Heffernan (2), Lunt, Greenwood, Blair, Mulhern, Donaldson, Horne	Ellis (8/8)	2,477	1st	
26 March, 15:00	Round 7	Halifax Panthers	H	Craven Park	W	28–14	Blair, Greenwood, Abdull, Moss	Ellis (4/4 + 2 pen.)		1st	
2 April, 15:00	Round 8	Batley Bulldogs	H	Craven Park	W	50–16	Shaw (2), Salter (2), Moss, Heffernan, Minns, Clarkson, Donaldson	Ellis (7/9)		1st	
9 April, 15:00	Round 9	Swinton Lions	A	Heywood Road	W	52–18	Donaldson (3), Hodgson, Abdull, Ellis, Dockar-Clay, Oakes, Scruton, Shaw	Ellis (6/10)		1st	
14 April, 15:00	Round 10	Featherstone Rovers	H	Craven Park	W	30–22	Quinlan, Clarkson, Cockayne, Shaw, Hodgson, Blair	Ellis (3/6)		1st	
17 April, 15:00 (BST)	Round 11	Toulouse Olympique	A	Stade Ernest-Argelès	L	6–14	Heffernan	Dockar-Clay (1/1)		1st	
30 April, 15:00	Round 12	Rochdale Hornets	H	Craven Park	W	24–16	Lawler, Shaw, Lunt, Kavanagh	Ellis (4/4)		1st	
7 May, 15:00	Round 13	Batley Bulldogs	A	Mount Pleasant	W	68–4	Shaw (3), Heffernan (2), Dockar-Clay (2), Butler-Fleming (2), Mulhern, Abdull, Ellis,	Ellis (10/12)		1st	
21 May, 15:00	Round 14	Swinton Lions	H	Craven Park	W	42–18	Shaw (3), Abdull (2), Wardill, Heffernan	Dockar-Clay (7/7)		1st	
27 May, 19:00 (Summer Bash)	Round 15	Bradford Bulls	N	Bloomfield Road	W	20–19	Heffernan (2), Abdull	Ellis (3/3 + 1 pen.)	11,557	1st	
4 June, 15:00	Round 16	Featherstone Rovers	A	Post Office Road	D	20–20	Shaw, Abdull, Moss, Ellis	Ellis (2/4)		1st	
11 June, 15:00	Round 17	Oldham R.L.F.C.	A	Bower Fold	W	32–24	Wardill (2), Shaw (2), Lunt, Abdull	Ellis (4/6)		1st	
18 June, 15:00	Round 18	Dewsbury Rams	H	Craven Park	W	64–11	Shaw (3), Heffernan (2), Salter (2), Ellis, Cockayne, Abdull, Cator, Addy	Ellis (8/12)		1st	
25 June, 15:00	Round 19	Sheffield Eagles	A	Belle Vue	W	40–18	Carney (2), Clarkson, Butler-Fleming, Scruton, Shaw, Lunt, Dockar-Clay	Ellis (4/8)		1st	
2 July, 15:00	Round 20	London Broncos	H	Craven Park	W	40–22	Moss (2), Jewitt, Heffernan, Addy, Dockar-Clay, Mulhern	Ellis (6/7)		1st	
9 July, 15:00	Round 21	Bradford Bulls	A	Odsal Stadium	W	42–10	Addy (3), Butler-Fleming, Carney, Clarkson, Mulhern	Ellis (7/7)		1st	
16 July, 15:00	Round 22	Toulouse Olympique	H	Craven Park	L	30–31	Addy, Lunt, Quinlan, Clarkson, Butler-Fleming	Ellis (5/5)		1st	
23 July, 15:00	Round 23	Halifax R.L.F.C.	A	The Shay	L	6–28	Moss	Ellis (1/1)		1st	

=== Table ===
Pos	Team	Pld	W	D	L	PF	PA	PD	Pts	Qualification
1	Hull Kingston Rovers (X)	23	19	1	3	850	385	+465	39	The Qualifiers
2	London Broncos	23	18	0	5	832	410	+422	36	The Qualifiers
3	Halifax	23	16	0	7	567	357	+210	32	The Qualifiers
4	Featherstone Rovers	23	15	1	7	687	421	+266	31	The Qualifiers
5	Toulouse Olympique	23	15	0	8	720	466	+254	30	Championship Shield
6	Batley Bulldogs	23	11	0	12	549	663	−114	22	Championship Shield
7	Sheffield Eagles	23	10	0	13	568	785	−217	20	Championship Shield
8	Dewsbury Rams	23	8	0	15	388	736	−348	16	Championship Shield
9	Rochdale Hornets	23	7	1	15	457	680	−223	15	Championship Shield
10	Swinton Lions	23	6	0	17	477	648	−171	12	Championship Shield
11	Oldham	23	5	1	17	410	735	−325	11	Championship Shield
12	Bradford Bulls (Note: Bradford Bulls deducted 12 points on 3 January 2017 for entering administration.)	23	6	0	17	500	719	−219	0	Championship Shield

(X) League Leaders Shield

== The Qualifiers ==
Date and time	Round	Versus	H/A	Venue	Result	Score	Tries	Goals	Attendance	Pos.	Report
6 August, 15:00	Q1	Halifax Panthers	H	Craven Park	W	26–22	Moss (2), Marsh, Lawler, Scruton	Ellis (3/5)	7,706		
12 August, 15:15	Q2	Leigh Centurions	A	Leigh Sports Village	W	20–16	Lunt (2), Shaw	Ellis (3/3 + 1 pen.)	5,335		
20 August, 15:00	Q3	London Broncos	H	Craven Park	W	35–30	Shaw (2), Addy, Moss, Mulhern	Ellis (5/5 + 2 pen.); Drop-goals: Atkin	7,235		
3 September, 15:00	Q4	Featherstone Rovers	A	Post Office Road	W	30–18	Shaw, Addy, Ellis, Minns, Heffernan	Ellis (4/5)	4,583		
9 September, 15:15	Q5	Widnes Vikings	H	Craven Park	W	12–6	Minns, Shaw	Ellis (2/2)	8,227		
15 September, 20:00	Q6	Catalans Dragons	H	Craven Park	L	19–20	Oakes, Cockayne, Lawler	Dockar-Clay (2/2), Atkin (1/1); Drop-goals: Atkin	7,405		
23 September, 15:00	Q7	Warrington Wolves	A	Halliwell Jones Stadium	L	46–24	Oakes (2), Shaw (2)	Ellis (4/4)	10,466		

=== Table ===
Pos	Team	Pld	W	D	L	PF	PA	PD	Pts	Qualification
1	Warrington Wolves	7	7	0	0	288	138	+150	14	Super League XXIII
2	Widnes Vikings	7	5	0	2	188	96	+92	10	Super League XXIII
3	Hull Kingston Rovers (P)	7	5	0	2	166	158	+8	10	Super League XXIII
4	Leigh Centurions (R)	7	4	0	3	203	104	+99	8	Million Pound Game
5	Catalans Dragons	7	4	0	3	130	143	−13	8	Million Pound Game
6	London Broncos	7	1	1	5	174	220	−46	3	2018 Championship
7	Featherstone Rovers	7	1	1	5	110	272	−162	3	2018 Championship
8	Halifax	7	0	0	7	82	210	−128	0	2018 Championship

(P) Promoted to Super League; (R) Relegated

== Challenge Cup ==
Date and time	Round	Versus	H/A	Venue	Result	Score	Tries	Goals	Attendance	Report
19 March; 15:00	Round 4	Sheffield Eagles	H	Craven Park	W	48–10	Lunt (2), Minns, Quinlan, Blair, Cockayne, Ellis, Greenwood	Ellis (8/8)	3,408	
22 April; 15:00	Round 5	Leigh Centurions	A	Leigh Sports Village	W	23–10	Shaw (2), Lawler, Greenwood	Ellis (3/4); Drop-goals: Ellis	9,152	
12 May; 20:00	Round 6	Salford Red Devils	A	AJ Bell Stadium	L	14–24	Lunt (2)	Ellis (2/2 + 1 pen.)	11,163	

== Transfers ==
=== Gains ===
Player	Club	Contract	Date
(England) Nick Scruton	Wakefield Trinity Wildcats		October 2016
(Scotland) Danny Addy	Bradford Bulls	1 Year + 2 Years	October 2016
(New Zealand) Mitch Clark	Bradford Bulls	1 Year + 2 Years	October 2016
(Australia) Jake Butler-Fleming	Wentworthville Magpies	1 Year	December 2016
(Australia) Adam Quinlan	St George Illawarra Dragons	2 Years	December 2016
(England) George Milton	Doncaster R.L.F.C.		2017
(England) David Hodgson	Retirement		January 2017
(Australia) Kieren Moss	Bradford Bulls	1 Year	January 2017
(Scotland) Ben Kavanagh	Bradford Bulls	2 Years	January 2017
(England) Josh Johnson	Redcliffe Dolphins	1 Year	March 2017
(New Zealand) Zach Dockar-Clay	Penrith Panthers		March 2017
(Australia) Justin Carney (Note: Carney signed for the club while serving an eight-match ban for racially abusing a player during a Challenge Cup match against Toronto Wolfpack.)	Salford Red Devils	1 Year	May 2017
(England) Lee Jewitt	Townsville Blackhawks	1 1/2 Years	June 2017
(England) Chris Atkin (Note: Atkin was originally signed to join the club for the 2018 season, however Hull Kingston Rovers paid a "five-figure sum" for Swinton, who were suffering from financial difficulties, to release Atkin with immediate effect.)	Swinton Lions	End of season	July 2017
(Samoa) Mose Masoe	St Helens R.F.C.	End of season	July 2017

=== Losses ===
Player	Club	Contract	Date
(France) John Boudebza	N/A	Contract voided	October 2016
(Italy) Terry Campese	N/A	Contract voided	October 2016
(Italy) Josh Mantellato	N/A	Contract voided	October 2016
(England) Dave Thompson	Leigh Centurions	2 Years	October 2016
(England) James Green	Leigh Centurions	2 Years	October 2016
(England) Iain Thornley	Catalans Dragons	2 Years	October 2016
(Scotland) Adam Walker	St Helens R.F.C.	2 Years	October 2016
(Australia) Ken Sio	Newcastle Knights	2 Years	October 2016
(England) Kieran Dixon	London Broncos	2 Years	November 2016
(Australia) Albert Kelly	Hull F.C.	1 Year	November 2016
(Australia) Mitchell Allgood	Wakefield Trinity Wildcats	1 Year	December 2016
(Australia) Dane Tilse	N/A	Retirement	January 2017
(France) Kevin Larroyer	Castleford Tigers	1 Year	February 2017

=== Loans ===
Player	Club	Loan period	Date
(England) Jordan Abdull	Hull F.C.	Season-long	November 2016
(England) Jamie Ellis	Huddersfield Giants	Season-long	November 2016
(Australia) Andrew Heffernan	Penrith Panthers	Season-long	December 2016

== Squad ==
2017 Hull Kingston Rovers Squad
First team squad			Coaching staff
1 (Australia) Adam Quinlan – FB; 2 (England) Ben Cockayne – FB; 3 (England) Thomas Minns – CE; 4 (England) Liam Salter – CE; 5 (England) Ryan Shaw – WG; 7 (England) Jamie Ellis – SO (gk); 8 (England) Nick Scruton – PR; 9 (England) Shaun Lunt (c) – HK; 10 (Australia) Dane Tilse – PR; 11 (Australia) Maurice Blair – SR; 12 (England) James Greenwood – PR; 13 (Scotland) Danny Addy – UT	14 (England) Chris Clarkson – SR; 15 (England) James Donaldson – LF; 16 (England) Jordan Abdull – HB; 17 (New Zealand) Mitch Clark – PR; 18 (Scotland) Graeme Horne – SR; 19 (England) George Lawler – HK; 20 (England) Matty Marsh – HB; 21 (Ireland) Robbie Mulhern – PR; 22 (Australia) Andrew Heffernan – CE; 23 (England) George Milton – LF; 24 (England) Joe Wardill – SR	25 (England) Will Jubb – HK; 26 (Scotland) Keiran Moran – PR; 27 (Scotland) Will Oakes – WG; 28 (England) Liam Harris – HB; 29 (Australia) Jake Butler-Fleming – CE, WG; 30 (England) Joe Cator – SR	Head coach: (Australia) Tim Sheens; Legend: (c) Captain(s); (vc) Vice-captain(s); (gk) = Goal kicker; Updated: 22 December 2016; Source(s): 2017 squad numbers revealed (Note: Shirt number 6 was retired by the club from May 2016 onwards following the death of former player and coach Roger Millward.)
