= 2015 Hull Kingston Rovers season =

English rugby league club season

Hull Kingston Rovers
Club information
- Nickname: The Robins
- Website: www.hullkr.co.uk

Current details
- Chairman: Neil Hudgell
- Head Coach: Chris Chester
- Captain: Terry Campese

Hull Kingston Rovers 2015 season is their 134th season in existence, and their 9th competing in the Super League. The Robins made a host of changes to the playing staff for the 2015 season, bringing in 13 new players, and releasing 18.

The 2015 season is Head Coach Chris Chester's first full season in charge, after replacing Craig Sandercock midway through last season. It sees the addition of two new assistant coaches to support the rookie Head Coach, firstly, experienced Assistant Willie Poaching from the Warrington Wolves, and secondly, rookie Assistant Coach David Hodgson, who takes up the duties after retiring from playing at the end of the 2014 season. These new Assistants replace the outgoing Stanley Gene, who moved to permanently take up the position of Head Coach at the Newcastle Thunder at the end of the 2014 season, and the position previously occupied by Chester himself.

2015 also sees the promotion of halfback and U-19's player of the year Matty Marsh to the first team squad.

== Transfers ==
Ins

Nat	Name	Signed From	Contract Length	Date
(England)	Darrell Goulding	Wigan Warriors	3 Years	July 2014
(Australia)	Ken Sio	Parramatta Eels	3 Years	July 2014
(Australia) (Italy)	Josh Mantellato	Newcastle Knights	3 Years	August 2014
(England)	James Donaldson	Bradford Bulls	2 Years	August 2014
(England)	Kieran Dixon	London Broncos	3 Years	August 2014
(France)	Kevin Larroyer	Catalans Dragons	1 Year Loan	August 2014
(England) (Republic of Ireland)	Tyrone McCarthy	Northern Pride	2 Years	August 2014
(Australia)	Albert Kelly	Gold Coast Titans	2 Years	October 2014
(Australia)	Maurice Blair	Gold Coast Titans	2 Years	October 2014
(France)	John Boudebza	Lézignan Sangliers	1 Year	October 2014
(England)	Ryan Bailey	Leeds Rhinos	2 Years	October 2014
(England)	Greg Burke	Wigan Warriors	1 Year Loan	November 2014
(Australia)	Mitchell Allgood	Parramatta Eels	3 Years	November 2014
(Australia) (Italy)	Terry Campese	Canberra Raiders	1 Year	December 2014
(England)	Shaun Lunt	Huddersfield Giants	1 Year Loan	March 2015

Outs

Nat	Name	Sold To	Contract Length	Date
(England) (Republic of Ireland)	Sean Gleeson	Retired	N/A	June 2014
(New Zealand)	Wayne Ulugia	Sacked	N/A	July 2014
(England)	Craig Hall	Wakefield Trinity Wildcats	2 Years	July 2014
(England) (Scotland)	Jonathan Walker	Leigh Centurions	1 ½ Years	July 2014
(England)	Josh Hodgson	Canberra Raiders	2 Years	August 2014
(Australia)	Rhys Lovegrove	London Broncos	2 Years	September 2014
(England)	Greg Eden	Brisbane Broncos	2 Years	September 2014
(Australia)	Travis Burns	St. Helens	3 Years	September 2014
(Australia)	Kris Keating	St. George Illwarra Dragons	1 Year	September 2014
(England)	Jamie Langley	Sheffield Eagles	2 Years	September 2014
(England)	Ade Gardner	St. Helens - Assistant Coach	Loan Return	September 2014
(Papua New Guinea)	Jason Chan	Huddersfield Giants	Loan Return	October 2014
(England) (Jamaica)	Omari Caro	Unattached	N/A	October 2014
(England)	David Hodgson	Retired - Assistant Coach	N/A	October 2014
(England)	Matty Beharrell	Gateshead Thunder	2 Years	October 2014
(Australia)	Justin Poore	Retired	N/A	October 2014
(England)	Jason Netherton	Retired - Liaison Officer	N/A	November 2014
(Papua New Guinea)	Neville Costigan	Townsville & Districts Blackhawks	2 Years	December 2014
(Australia)	Michael Weyman	Retired	N/A	March 2015
(England)	Keale Carlile	Sheffield Eagles	2 Years	March 2015
(England)	Ryan Bailey	Released	N/A	March 2015

== 2015 Squad ==
* Announced on 11 December 2014.

Hull KR 2015 Squad
First team squad			Coaching staff
1 Kieran Dixon – FB, WG; 2 Ben Cockayne – WG, FB; 3 Darrell Goulding – CE; 4 Josh Mantellato – CE, WG, FB; 5 Ken Sio – WG; 6 Maurice Blair – SO, CE, SR; 7 Albert Kelly – SH; 8 Adam Walker – PR; 9; 10; 11 Kevin Larroyer – SR; 12 Graeme Horne – SR, CE; 13 Tyrone McCarthy – SR, LF	14 Mitchell Allgood – PR; 15 James Donaldson – LF, SR; 16; 17 Greg Burke – LF, PR; 18 Liam Salter – CE; 19 Kris Welham – CE; 20 James Green – PR; 21 Aaron Ollett – SR, LF; 22 Jordan Cox – SR, PR; 23 Terry Campese – SO, SH (c); 24 John Boudebza – HK; 25 Macauley Hallett – CE, WG; 26 Sonny Esslemont – LF, SR	27 Josh Guzdek – FB; 28 Connor Robinson – HK, SH; 29 Matthew Marsh – SO, SH; 30 Steven Holker – LF; 31 Shaun Lunt – HK	Head coach: Chris Chester; Assistant coaches: Willie Poching; David Hodgson; Legend: (c) Captain(s); (vc) Vice-captain(s); Updated: 11 December 2014; Source(s): 2015 Squad Numbers

== League table ==
=== Super League ===
Pos	Team	Pld	W	D	L	PF	PA	PD	Pts	Qualification
1	Leeds Rhinos	23	16	1	6	758	477	+281	33	Super League Super 8s
2	St Helens	23	16	0	7	598	436	+162	32	Super League Super 8s
3	Wigan Warriors	23	15	1	7	589	413	+176	31	Super League Super 8s
4	Huddersfield Giants	23	13	2	8	538	394	+144	28	Super League Super 8s
5	Castleford Tigers	23	13	0	10	547	505	+42	26	Super League Super 8s
6	Warrington Wolves	23	12	0	11	552	456	+96	24	Super League Super 8s
7	Hull F.C.	23	11	0	12	452	484	−32	22	Super League Super 8s
8	Catalans Dragons	23	9	2	12	561	574	−13	20	Super League Super 8s
9	Widnes Vikings	23	9	1	13	518	565	−47	19	The Qualifiers
10	Hull Kingston Rovers	23	9	0	14	534	646	−112	18	The Qualifiers
11	Salford Red Devils	23	8	1	14	447	617	−170	17	The Qualifiers
12	Wakefield Trinity Wildcats	23	3	0	20	402	929	−527	6	The Qualifiers

Source: Rugby League Project
Rules for classification: 1) Points; 2) Points difference; 3) Number of points scored;

=== Qualifiers ===
Pos	Team	Pld	W	D	L	PF	PA	PD	Pts	Qualification
1	Hull Kingston Rovers	7	7	0	0	234	118	+116	14	2016 Super League
2	Widnes Vikings	7	5	0	2	232	70	+162	10	2016 Super League
3	Salford Red Devils	7	5	0	2	239	203	+36	10	2016 Super League
4	Wakefield Trinity Wildcats (W)	7	3	0	4	153	170	−17	6	Million Pound Game
5	Bradford Bulls	7	3	0	4	167	240	−73	6	Million Pound Game
6	Halifax	7	2	0	5	162	186	−24	4	2016 Championship
7	Sheffield Eagles	7	2	0	5	152	267	−115	4	2016 Championship
8	Leigh Centurions	7	1	0	6	146	231	−85	2	2016 Championship

Source: Rugby League Project
Rules for classification: 1) Points; 2) Points difference; 3) Number of points scored;
(W) Million Pound Game Winner

== Fixtures & Results ==
=== Super League ===
Competition	Round	Opponent	Result	Score	Home/Away	Venue	Attendance	Date
Friendly	N/A	Halifax	Loss	16-46	Home	KC Lightstream Stadium	N/A	11 January 2015
Friendly	N/A	Hull F.C.	Win	22-28	Away	KC Stadium	9,445	18 January 2015
Friendly	N/A	Warrington Wolves	Loss	40-0	Away	Halliwell Jones Stadium	3,267	25 January 2015
Super League XX	1	Leeds Rhinos	Loss	30-40	Home	KC Lightstream Stadium	11,811	8 February 2015
Super League XX	2	Wakefield Trinity Wildcats	Loss	24-44	Away	The Rapid Solicitors Stadium	5,320	15 February 2015
Super League XX	3	Wigan Warriors	Win	22-20	Home	KC Lightstream Stadium	7,632	1 March 2015
Super League XX	4	Warrington Wolves	Loss	32-24	Away	Halliwell Jones Stadium	9,597	8 March 2015
Super League XX	5	Catalans Dragons	Win	50-20	Home	KC Lightstream Stadium	6,732	15 March 2015
Super League XX	6	Widnes Vikings	Loss	20-16	Away	Select Security Stadium	5,273	22 March 2015
Super League XX	7	St Helens R.F.C.	Win	24-22	Home	KC Lightstream Stadium	7,311	27 March 2015
Super League XX	8	Hull F.C.	Win	6-20	Away	KC Stadium	20,507	2 April 2015
Super League XX	9	Huddersfield Giants	Win	20-16	Home	KC Lightstream Stadium	7,827	6 April 2015
Super League XX	10	Castleford Tigers	Loss	25-4	Away	The Wish Communications Stadium	6,012	11 April 2015
Super League XX	11	Salford Red Devils	Win	34-28	Home	KC Lightstream Stadium	6,717	30 June 2015
Super League XX	12	Catalans Dragons	Loss	32-24	Away	Stade Gilbert Brutus	7,400	25 April 2015
Super League XX	13	Wigan Warriors	Loss	60-0	Away	DW Stadium	11,468	1 May 2015
Super League XX	14	Wakefield Trinity Wildcats	Win	54-6	Home	KC Lightstream Stadium	7,378	7 May 2015
Super League XX	15	Leeds Rhinos	Loss	36-16	Away	Headingley Carnegie Stadium	15,206	22 May 2015
Super League XX	16	Hull F.C.	Loss	46-20	Magic Weekend	St James' Park	40,871	30 May 2015
Super League XX	17	Castleford Tigers	Loss	22-30	Home	KC Lightstream Stadium	7,093	7 June 2015
Super League XX	18	Widnes Vikings	Win	38-16	Home	KC Lightstream Stadium	6,982	14 June 2015
Super League XX	19	Warrington Wolves	Win	36-10	Home	KC Lightstream Stadium	7,455	21 June 2015
Super League XX	20	Huddersfield Giants	Loss	32-14	Away	John Smith's Stadium	5,596	5 July 2015
Super League XX	21	Salford Red Devils	Loss	31-18	Away	AJ Bell Stadium	4,500	12 July 2015
Super League XX	22	Hull F.C.	Loss	12-22	Home	KC Lightstream Stadium	11,350	19 July 2015
Super League XX	23	St Helens R.F.C.	Loss	52-12	Away	Langtree Park	10,781	24 July 2015

=== Challenge Cup ===
Competition	Round	Opponent	Result	Home/Away	Venue	Attendance	Date
Ladbrokes Challenge Cup	5	Bradford Bulls	30-50	Away	Provident Stadium	4,538	19 April 2015
Ladbrokes Challenge Cup	6	Wigan Warriors	12-16	Neutral	Leigh Sports Village	4,677	15 May 2015
Ladbrokes Challenge Cup	QF	Catalans Dragons	32-26	Home	KC Lightstream Stadium	6,073	25 June 2015
Ladbrokes Challenge Cup	SF	Warrington Wolves	26-18	Neutral	Headingley Carnegie Stadium	13,049	1 August 2015
Ladbrokes Challenge Cup	F	Leeds Rhinos	0-50	Neutral	Wembley Stadium	80,140	29 August 2015

== Tryscorers ==
No. of Tries	Player(s)
8	Ken Sio
6	Albert Kelly
3	Ben Cockayne
2	Mitchell Allgood, Kieran Dixon, Shaun Lunt, Kris Welham, Josh Mantellato
1	Terry Campese, Tyrone McCarthy, Ryan Bailey, Kevin Larroyer, Liam Salter, Graeme Horne

== See also ==
- Hull Kingston Rovers
- Super League XX
