= St Mary's College, Hull =

St Mary's College

Location
- Cranbrook Avenue; Kingston upon Hull, East Riding of Yorkshire, HU6 7TN; England; 53.77531°N 0.36320°W

Information
- Type: Academy
- Motto: Per Mariam Ad Jesum
- Religious affiliation: Roman Catholic
- Established: 1960
- Local authority: Hull City Council
- Trust: St Cuthbert's Roman Catholic Academy Trust
- Department for Education URN: 144104 Tables
- Ofsted: Reports
- CEO of St Cuthbert's RC Academy Trust: R McEvoy
- Headteacher: M Stead
- Gender: Coeducational
- Age: 11 to 19
- Houses: Theresa, Ruth, Postgate, Chanel, Fisher, McAuley
- Website: http://www.smchull.org/

St Mary's College is a coeducational Roman Catholic secondary school and sixth form located in Cranbrook Avenue, Kingston upon Hull, England. It was formed following an amalgamation between the former St Mary's Convent High School for Girls and Marist College for boys. In 2002 'The Academy' was built, as a sports centre for members of the school, and members of the public to use outside of school hours.

== History ==
Formerly St Mary's Grammar School, a voluntary aided Roman Catholic school, it was mostly destroyed by bombs in 1941 having been established by the Sisters of Mercy near a convent on Anlaby Road. It was later rebuilt and moved to Inglemire Lane in 1960 to become St Mary's Grammar School for Girls, close to the Marist College for Boys on Cottingham Road. Marist College had been established in 1926 by the Society of Mary (Marist Fathers).

In 1988 after LEA reorganisation, it converted into St Mary's College, a Voluntary Aided, Roman Catholic, Co-Educational and Comprehensive Day school for pupils aged 11–19 in the Diocese of Middlesbrough.

The school was subsequently awarded the status of a specialist Sports College and became a Department for Education and Employment Beacon School.

In October 2017 St Mary's College converted to academy status. The school is now sponsored by the St Cuthbert's Roman Catholic Academy Trust.

== Curriculum ==
St Mary's College teaches the core subjects of Maths, English and Science for years 7 to 11, with compulsory Religious Education (RE) and Physical Education (PE). Furthermore, the options of History, Geography, German, French, Spanish, Drama, Musical Theatre, Health and Social care, Business, Computer Science, Media Studies, Cooking, Art and Design, Product and Design and extra PE.

The sixth form provides A-Level, BTEc First or BTEc National courses for ages 16- to 19-year-olds. A-Level courses being; Applied General Science, Biology, Business, Chemistry, Computer Science, Criminology, Economics, English Combined, English Language, English Literature, Film Studies, French, Further Maths, Spanish, Geography, Government & Politics, History, Law, Maths, Media, P.E, Physics, Polish, Politics, Photography, Psychology, R.E and sociology. BTEC courses; being Level 3 Health & Social, Level 3 Sport, Level 3 Creative Media, Art & Design, Level 3 Music, Level 3 Acting, Level 3 Performing Arts, Level 3 Production Arts, Level 3 Extended Sports, English as an Additional Language, Level 2 ECDL, OCR Level 2 Media, OCR Level 2 in Sport and Law.

== Pupils ==
As St Mary's College is the only Roman Catholic secondary school in the area, pupils at the school come from a wide catchment area. Year 7 Pupils usually have been pupils at one of the numerous feeder Catholic Primary schools in Hull. Pupils also join the school from further afield especially from the East Yorkshire area if parents have decided they want their children to have a Catholic education.

=== Notable former pupils ===
- Tim Lutkin - Creative Director and lighting designer for theatre and live events.
- Lara Jensen - Costume designer and Milliner
- Joe Hurd - TV Chef
- Mike Burnett – Rugby league player
- Liam Garrigan – Actor
- Josh Guzdek – rugby league player
- Keane Lewis-Potter – footballer
- Matty Marsh – rugby league player
- Kieran Moran – rugby league player

== Headteachers ==
- Mrs R. McEvoy – Chief Executive Officer of St Cuthbert's Roman Catholic Academy Trust
- Mrs M. Stead – Headteacher
