= Aaron Ollett =

English rugby league footballer

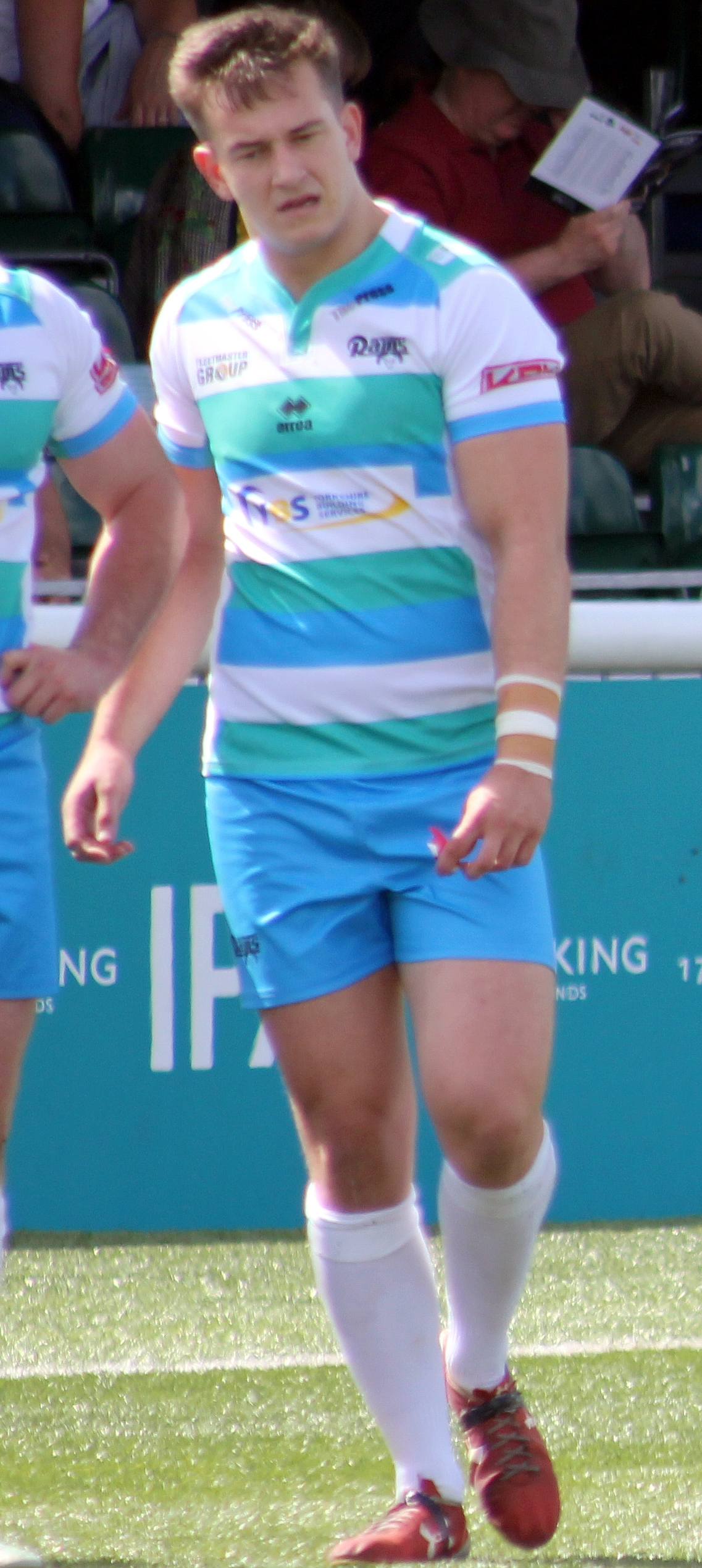

Personal information
- Born: 19 November 1992 (age 33)
- Weight: 15 st 8 lb (99 kg)

Playing information
- Position: Second-row, Loose forward
Club
Years	Team	Pld	T	G	FG	P
2013–15	Hull Kingston Rovers	26	1	0	0	4
2013(loan)	→ Gateshead Thunder	14	5	0	0	20
2014(loan)	→ Gateshead Thunder	8	2	0	0	8
2016	Keighley Cougars	25	5	0	0	20
2017	Dewsbury Rams	19	3	0	0	12
2018–19	Newcastle Thunder	24	9	0	0	36
2020–23	Doncaster	45	11	0	0	48
	Total	161	36	0	0	148
- Source: As of 23 January 2025

Aaron Ollett (born 19 November 1992) is a professional UK rugby league footballer who played as a second-row or loose forward for the Doncaster R.L.F.C. in League 1.

== Playing career ==
He was developed through Hull KR's academy, and was loaned to Newcastle Thunder, where he appeared fairly regularly as a Hooker. He made seven appearances in the 2014 season and scored two tries.

On 13 June 2014, Ollett appeared for Hull Kingston Rovers in a 34-4 defeat by Warrington. He has also been picked in Hull Kingston Rovers' squad against Bradford Bulls on 20 June 2014 along with fellow youngster Sonny Esslemont.

In October 2015 he joined Keighley. This was followed by a move to Dewsbury for the 2017 Season. In November 2017 Ollett signed with Newcastle for the 2018 season. In 2020, Ollett joined Doncaster.
