= Kieran Dixon =

English rugby league footballer

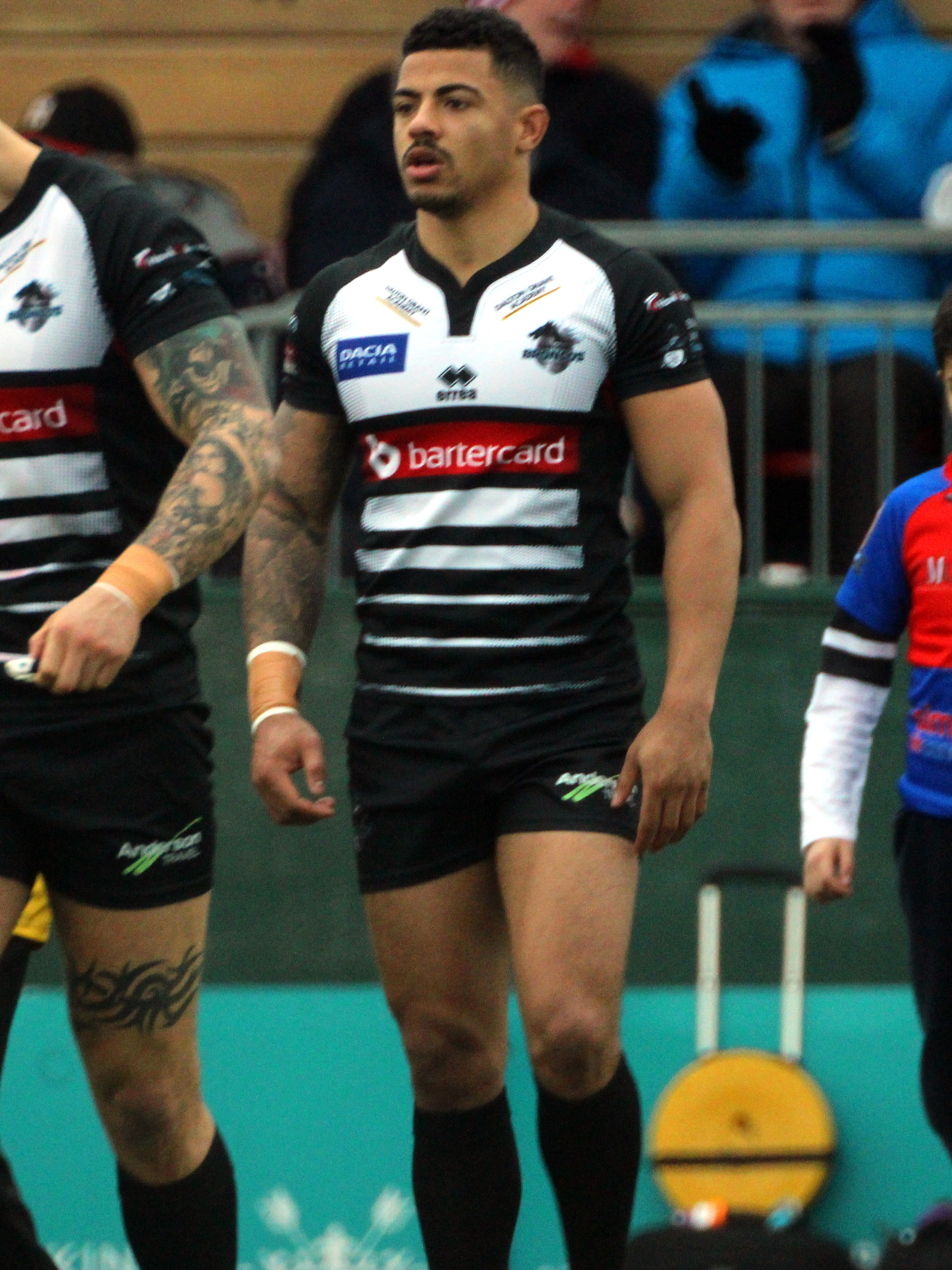

Personal information
- Full name: Kieran Dixon
- Born: 22 August 1992 (age 34) Hackney, London, England
- Height: 5 ft 9 in (1.75 m)
- Weight: 13 st 8 lb (86 kg)

Playing information
- Position: Wing, Fullback
Club
Years	Team	Pld	T	G	FG	P
2012–14	London Broncos	55	39	2	0	160
2014(DR)	→ Hemel Stags	2	0	0	0	0
2015–16	Hull Kingston Rovers	39	29	16	0	148
2016(loan)	→ Newcastle Thunder	1	1	0	0	4
2017–20	London Broncos	81	58	188	0	608
2021	York City Knights	18	11	64	0	172
2022	Leigh Centurions	3	1	0	0	4
2022(loan)	→ Widnes Vikings	5	3	0	0	12
2022(loan)	→ Rochdale Hornets	1	0	0	0	0
2023–24	Widnes Vikings	38	24	46	0	188
2024–26	Oldham	30	35	116	0	372
2026(loan)	→ Salford RLFC	1	0	4	0	8
2026	Salford RLFC	13	2	47	0	102
	Total	287	203	483	0	1778
Representative
Years	Team	Pld	T	G	FG	P
2012–13	England Knights	3	2	0	0	8
- Source: As of 5 November 2026

Kieran Dixon (born 22 August 1992) is an English professional rugby league footballer who last played as winger or fullback for Salford RLFC. He has played for the England Knights at international level.

He has played for the London Broncos in the Super League and in the Championship, and on loan from the Broncos at the Hemel Stags in League 1. He also played for Hull Kingston Rovers in the Super League.

== Background ==
Dixon was born in Hackney, London, England. Dixon grew up in Hemel Hempstead and attended The Cavendish School. He is of Antiguan descent.

== Playing career ==
=== London Broncos ===
Kieran Dixon made his début for the London Broncos in the 24-34 defeat by St Helens in the Super League match at Twickenham Stoop on 4 February 2012.

He scored his first try against Wakefield Trinity Wildcats at the Twickenham Stoop in a 36-0 win.

He suffered a career threatening injury whilst on international duty in 2013, and returned to first team action towards the end of the 2014 Super League season, with the Broncos relegation from the top flight long since confirmed.

=== Hemel Stags ===
Dixon was loaned to the Hemel Stags in a bid to regain fitness on his return to first team with the Broncos.

=== Hull Kingston Rovers ===
After a serious injury ruled him out for most of the 2014 season, Dixon joined Hull Kingston Rovers in 2015. He appeared for Rovers in the 2015 Challenge Cup final, however his performance in the match was heavily criticised as the team suffered a record-breaking 50-0 defeat by Leeds. The following week, Dixon bounced back to score two tries in a man-of-the-match display as Hull Kingston Rovers beat Wakefield Trinity. And on 12th 09-15 went 2 better with yet another man of the match performance and 4 tries against Bradford Bulls in a match that made sure Rovers secured Super league status for the next season.

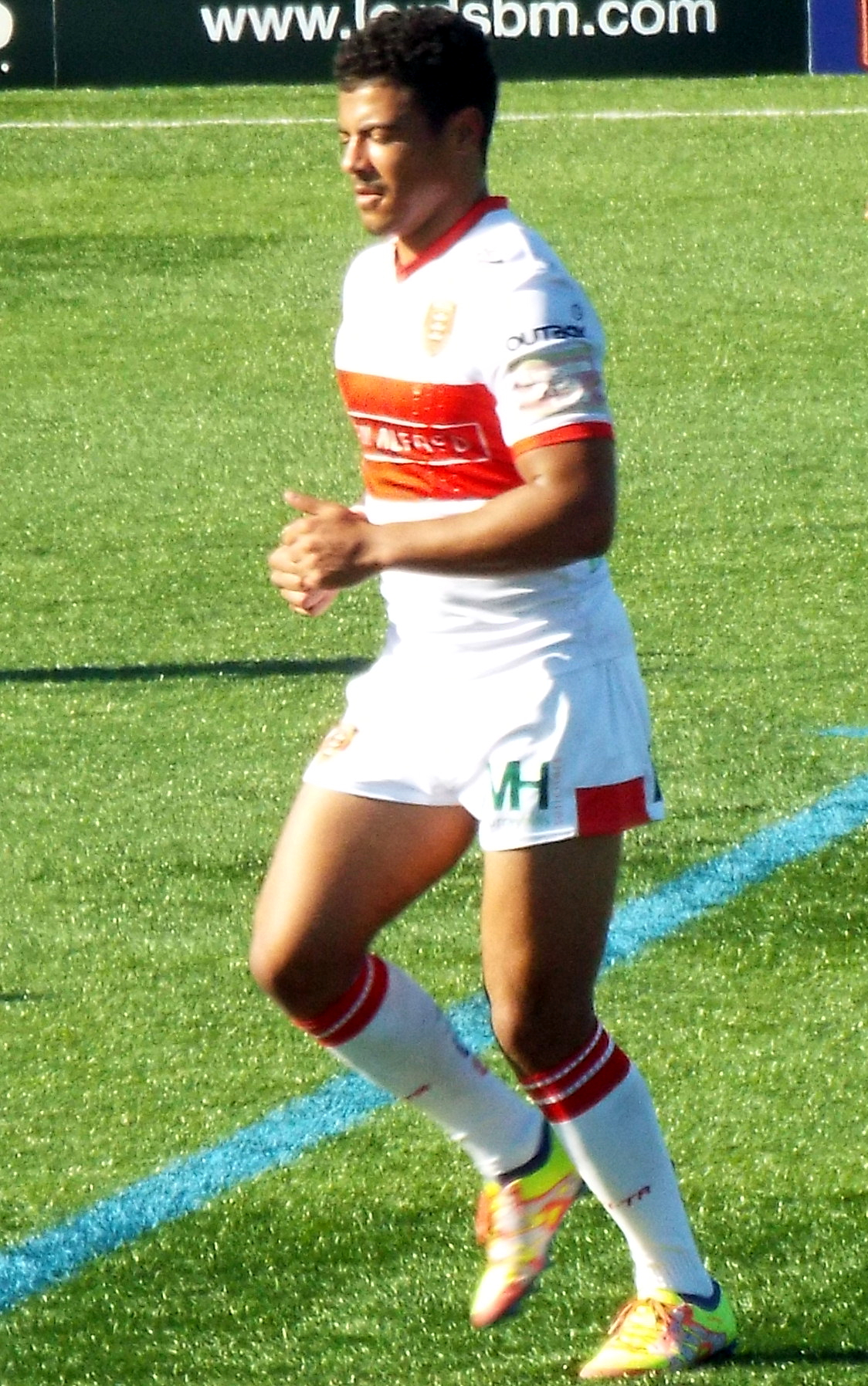
Dixon playing for Hull Kingston Rovers in 2016

=== Newcastle Thunder ===
Dixon played one game on loan for the Newcastle Thunder in RFL League 1, scoring a try against the London Skolars in May 2016.

=== Return to London ===
Dixon re-signed for the London Broncos after Hull Kingston Rovers were relegated from the Super League, taking up the offer to return to his home club for the 2017 and 2018 seasons.

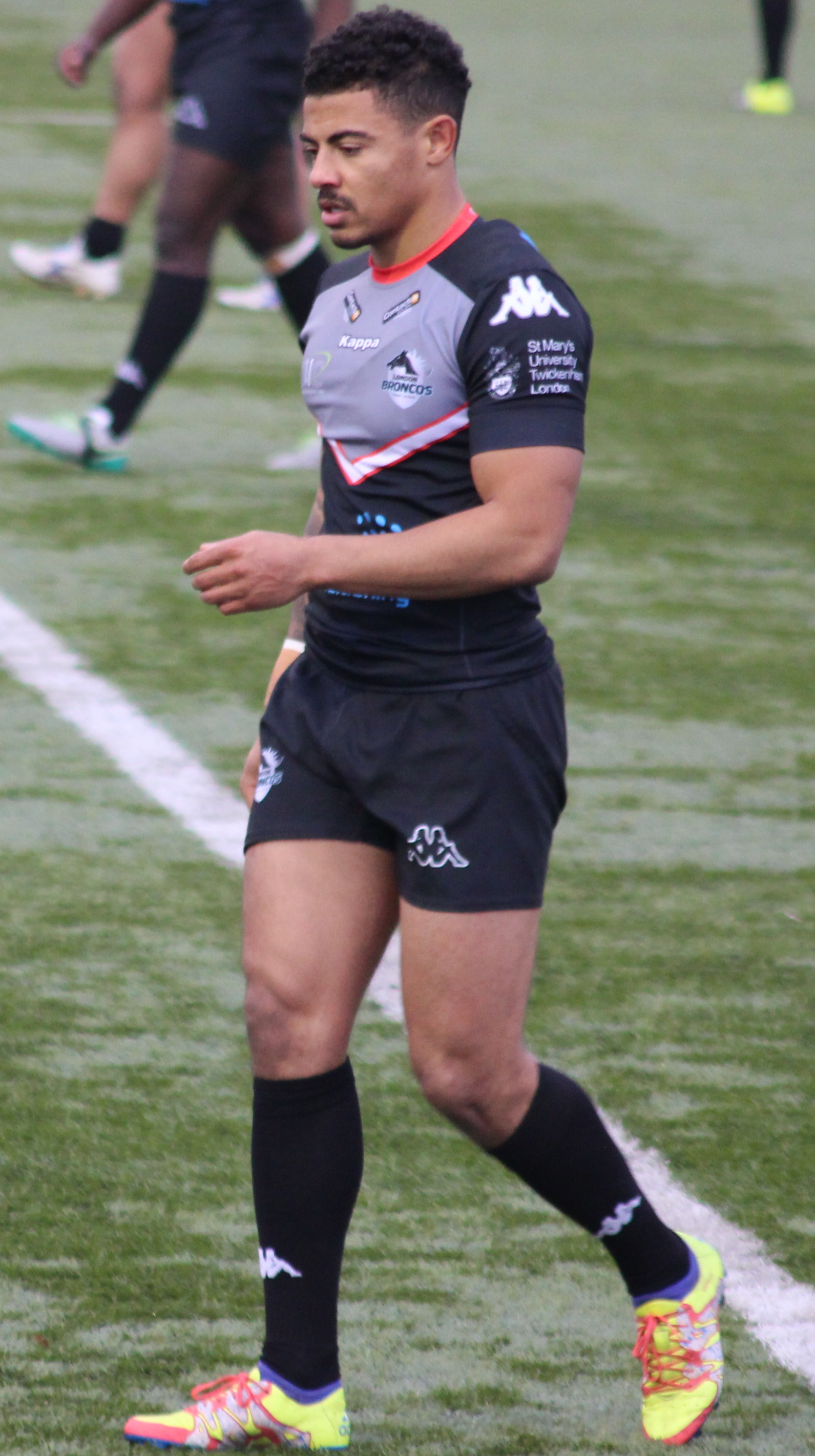
Dixon playing for the London Broncos in 2017

Dixon was the top try scorer for the club in 2018, with 26 tries to his name. The club was promoted back to Super League after victory in the "Million Pound game" away in Toronto.

In 2019 London were relegated from the Super League on points difference, with Dixon topping the goal and point scoring record for the Broncos for their 2019 season.

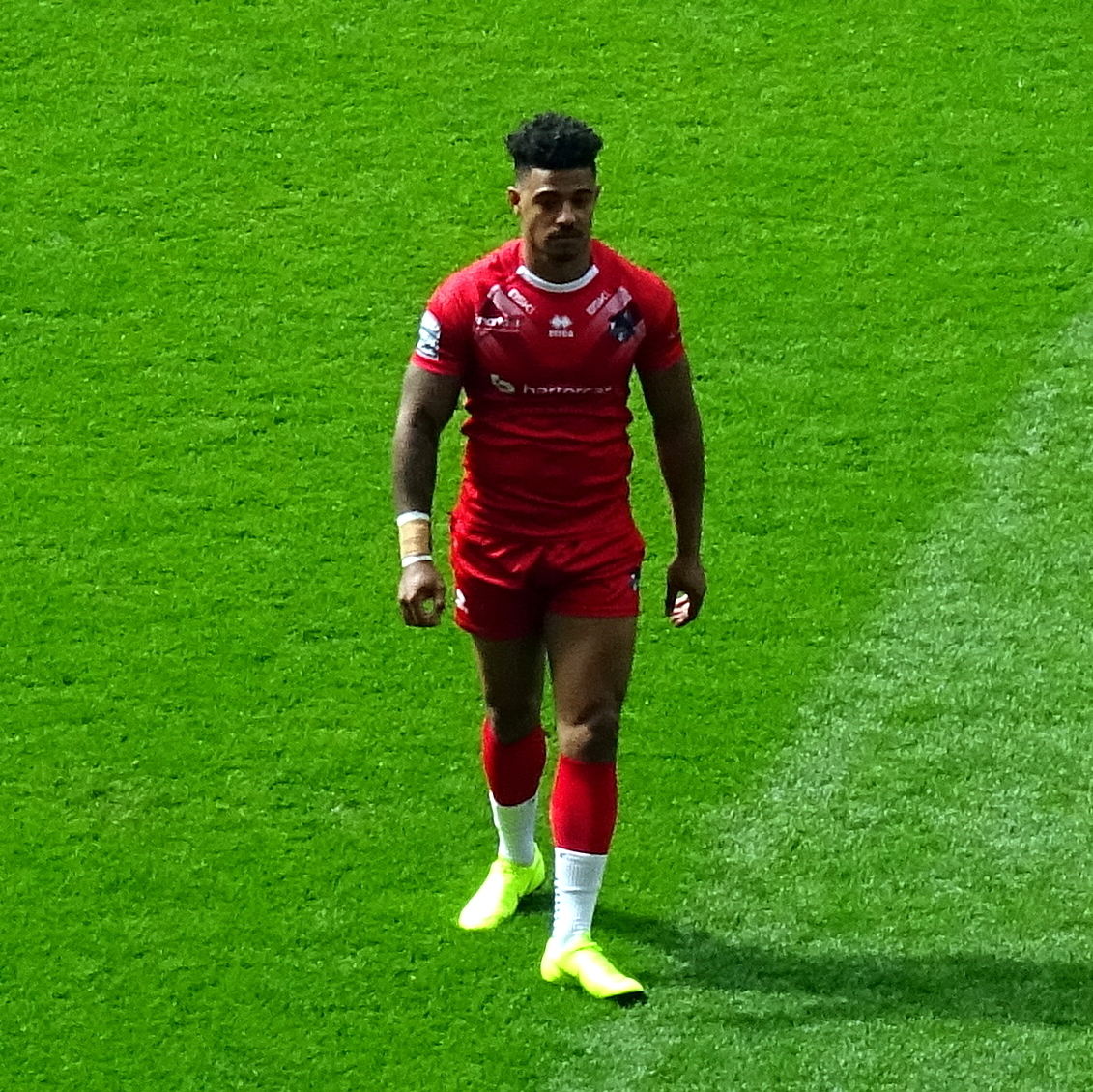
Dixon playing for the London Broncos in 2019

Dixon again topped the goal and point scoring record for London, in their shortened season that was affected by the global pandemic.

=== York City Knights ===
On 17 November 2020 it was announced that Dixon would join the York City Knights from the 2021 season.

=== Widnes Vikings ===
On 23 June 2022 it was announced that both he and Luis Roberts would join the Widnes Vikings on loan for the remainder of the 2022 season. In October 2022 Dixon made his move permanent with a two-year deal.

=== Oldham RLFC ===
On 10 July 2024 it was reported that he had signed for Oldham RLFC in the RFL League 1 on a 18-month deal.

On 11 May 2026 the club confirmed that he had left by mutual consent

=== Salford RLFC (loan) ===
On 10 April 2026 it was reported that he had signed for Salford RLFC in the RFL Championship on short-term loan

=== Salford RLFC (re-join) ===
On 15 May 2026 it was reported that he had signed for Salford RLFC in the RFL Championship

On 20 October 2026 the club confirmed that he had left Salford RLFC

== International ==
Dixon played at representative level with the England Knights.

He sustained a career threatening injury in 2013 against Samoa.

== Club statistics ==
Year	Club	Competition	Appearances	Tries	Goals	Drop goals	Points
2012	London Broncos	Super League	27	16	1	0	66
2013	London Broncos	Super League	24	21	1	0	86
2014	London Broncos	Super League	4	2	0	0	8
2014	Hemel Stags	Championship 1	2	0	0	0	0
2015	Hull Kingston Rovers	Super League	28	22	10	0	108
2016	Hull Kingston Rovers	Super League	12	8	6	0	44
2016	Newcastle Thunder	League 1	1	1	0	0	4
2017	London Broncos	Championship	21	19	45	0	166
2018	London Broncos	Championship	29	27	53	0	214
2019	London Broncos	Championship	27	10	75	0	190
2020	London Broncos	Championship	5	2	15	0	38
2021	York City Knights	Championship	18	11	64	0	172
2022	Leigh Centurions	Championship	3	1	0	0	4
2022	Widnes Vikings	Championship	5	3	0	0	12
2022	Rochdale Hornets	League One	1	0	0	0	0
2023	Widnes Vikings	Championship	27	16	40	0	144
2024	Widnes Vikings	Championship	6	5	6	0	32
2024	Oldham	Championship	7	9	39	0	114
2025	Oldham	Championship	15	15	51	0	162
2026	Oldham	Championship	8	11	26	0	96
2026	Salford	Championship	14	2	51	0	110
Club career total			287	203	483	0	1,778
