= Dave Thompson (rugby league, born 1995) =

English rugby league footballer

Personal information
- Full name: David Thompson
- Born: 13 September 1995 (age 29)
- Height: 6 ft 1 in (1.85 m)
- Weight: 15 st 4 lb (97 kg)

Playing information
- Position: Wing
Club
| Years | Team | Pld | T | G | FG | P |
|---|---|---|---|---|---|---|
| 2016 | Warrington Wolves | 0 | 0 | 0 | 0 | 0 |
| 2016(loan) | → Hull Kingston Rovers | 3 | 0 | 0 | 0 | 0 |
| 2017–18 | Leigh Centurions | 1 | 0 | 0 | 0 | 0 |
| 2017(DR) | → Sheffield Eagles | 0 | 0 | 0 | 0 | 0 |
| 2017(DR) | → Whitehaven | 17 | 5 | 0 | 0 | 20 |
| 2018–20 | Whitehaven | 27 | 13 | 0 | 0 | 52 |
| | Total | 48 | 18 | 0 | 0 | 72 |
- Source: As of 21 March 2021

David Thompson (born 13 September 1995) is a professional rugby league footballer who last played as a winger for Whitehaven in Betfred League 1.

He previously played for Hull Kingston Rovers and in the reserve team at Warrington Wolves.

He has played for the Leigh Centurions in the Super League and in March 2017 he became available to play for Whitehaven on Dual registration after the club signed a deal with Leigh.

In November 2017 his move to Whitehaven was made permanent with a deal for the 2018 season.
