= Joe Wardill =

English rugby league footballer

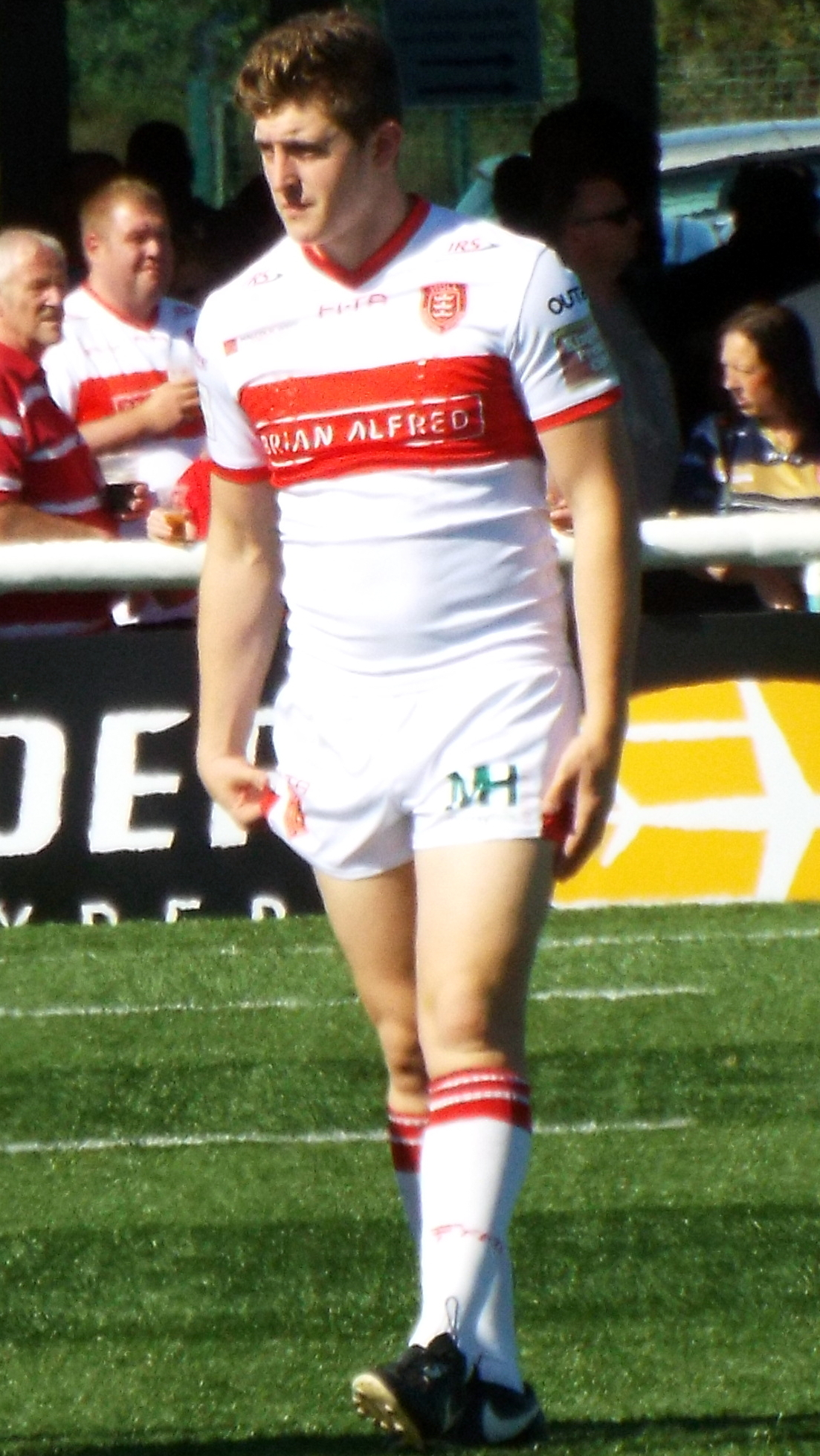

Personal information
- Full name: Joseph Wardill
- Born: 26 November 1997 (age 28) Beverley, East Riding of Yorkshire, England

Playing information
- Height: 6 ft 1 in (186 cm)
- Weight: 14 st 13 lb (95 kg)
- Position: Wing, Centre, Fullback
Club
| Years | Team | Pld | T | G | FG | P |
|---|---|---|---|---|---|---|
| 2016–19 | Hull Kingston Rovers | 17 | 5 | 0 | 0 | 20 |
| 2020 | Dewsbury Rams | 0 | 0 | 0 | 0 | 0 |
| | Total | 17 | 5 | 0 | 0 | 20 |

Joe Wardill (born 26 November 1997) is an English former professional rugby league footballer who last played as a winger and centre for the Dewsbury Rams in the Championship.

Wardill is currently assistant coach of Hull Kingston Rovers' Women's Team.

== Background ==
Wardill was born in Beverley, East Riding of Yorkshire, England. Wardill is a former pupil of Beverley Grammar School. Wardill is a product of Hull Kingston Rovers' Academy System.

== Playing career ==
=== Hull Kingston Rovers (2016-19) ===
He made his début for Hull Kingston Rovers in the 2016 Super League season, against Wigan at the DW Stadium. On his home début at Craven Park in 2016, Wardill scored a try in the shock 22–36 defeat to the Oldham in the Challenge Cup. But despite the loss, he claimed the 'Man-of-the-Match' Award. Wardill suffered relegation from the Super League with Hull Kingston Rovers in the 2016 season, due to losing the Million Pound Game at the hands of Salford. 12-months later however, Wardill was part of the Hull Kingston Rovers side that won promotion back to the Super League, at the first time of asking following relegation the season prior. On 3 May 2018, it was revealed that Wardill had signed a new three-year contract extension with Hull Kingston Rovers, to keep him at Craven Park until the end of the 2021 season. It was revealed on 23 April 2019, that Wardill had decided to retire from professional rugby league following three hip operations in as many years. Wardill was just 21-years-old when he was forced to retire through persistent injury.

=== Dewsbury Rams ===
On 21 September 2020 it was reported that Wardill had come out of retirement to sign for Dewsbury On 25 March 2021 it was reported that Wardill had been forced to retire for a second time due to injury

== Coaching career ==
=== Assistant Coach (2019 - present) ===
Wardill, following his retirement from professional rugby league on 23 April 2019, Joe was subsequently appointed as assistant coach to Hull Kingston Rovers' newly formed Women's Team.

== Honours ==
=== Club (Hull Kingston Rovers 2016-19) ===
- 2018: 'Community Clubman Award'
