= Thomas Minns =

English rugby league footballer

Tom Minns
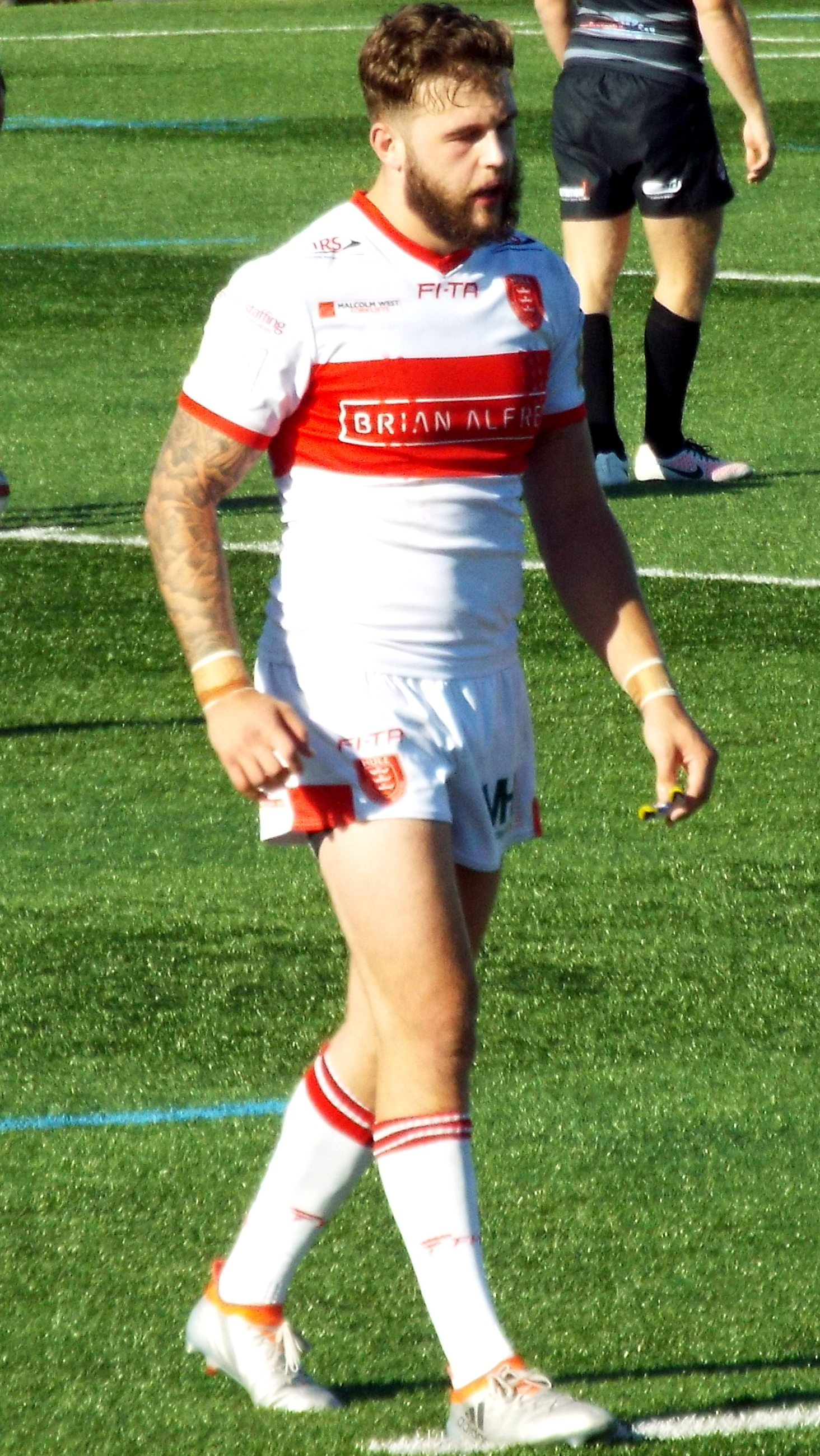

Personal information
- Full name: Thomas Minns
- Born: 4 September 1994 (age 32) Leeds, West Yorkshire, England
- Height: 6 ft 0 in (184 cm)
- Weight: 14 st 5 lb (91 kg)

Playing information

Rugby league
- Position: Centre, Wing
Club
Years	Team	Pld	T	G	FG	P
2013–15	Leeds Rhinos	3	1	0	0	4
2014(loan)	→ London Broncos	24	6	0	0	24
2015(loan)	→ Featherstone Rovers	16	8	0	0	32
2016–18	Hull Kingston Rovers	49	34	0	0	136
2019	Hull Kingston Rovers	0	0	0	0	0
2020–21	Featherstone Rovers	11	6	0	0	24
2022	Newcastle Thunder	0	0	0	0	0
2022	Wakefield Trinity	2	1	0	0	4
2025	Goole Vikings	13	10	0	0	40
	Total	118	66	0	0	264

Rugby union
Club
Years	Team	Pld	T	G	FG	P
2025–	Hull RUFC	0	0	0	0	0
- Source: As of 11 September 2025

Thomas "Tom" Minns (born 4 September 1994) is an English former rugby league and current rugby union player who plays as a centre for Hull RUFC in the National League 1.

He has previously played for the Leeds Rhinos, and on loan from Leeds at the London Broncos and Featherstone Rovers, and Hull Kingston Rovers in two separate spells in the Super League and the Championship.

== Background ==
Minns was born in Leeds, West Yorkshire, England.

He grew up in seacroft and attended David young community academy. He was head boy

== Playing career ==
=== Leeds Rhinos ===
In 2013, Minns made three appearances for Leeds and scored a single try.

=== London Broncos ===
In 2014, he was loaned to the London Broncos, with two of his fellow, young team-mates from Leeds.

=== Featherstone Rovers ===
Minns spent the 2015 season on loan at Featherstone Rovers, recording 16 outings and scoring eight tries.

=== Hull Kingston Rovers ===
On 3 July 2015, it was announced that Minns had signed a three-year deal to play for Hull Kingston Rovers in the Super League, starting from the 2016 rugby league season. Minns suffered relegation from the Super League with Hull Kingston Rovers in the 2016 season, due to losing the Million Pound Game at the hands of Salford. 12-months later however, Minns was part of Hull Kingston Rovers side that won promotion back to the Super League, at the first time of asking following relegation the season prior. On 22 May 2019, it was announced that Minns would be returning to play for Hull Kingston Rovers until the end of the 2019 season.

=== Newcastle Thunder ===
On 25 October 2021 it was reported that he had signed for Newcastle Thunder in the RFL Championship

=== Wakefield Trinity ===
On 5 January 2022, it was reported that he had signed for Wakefield Trinity in the Super League.

=== Goole Vikings ===
On 4 Oct 2024 it was reported that he had signed for Goole Vikings in the RFL League 1

=== Hull RUFC ===
On 11 September 2025 it was reported that he had switched codes to play rugby union for Hull RUFC
