= James Greenwood (rugby league) =

English rugby league footballer

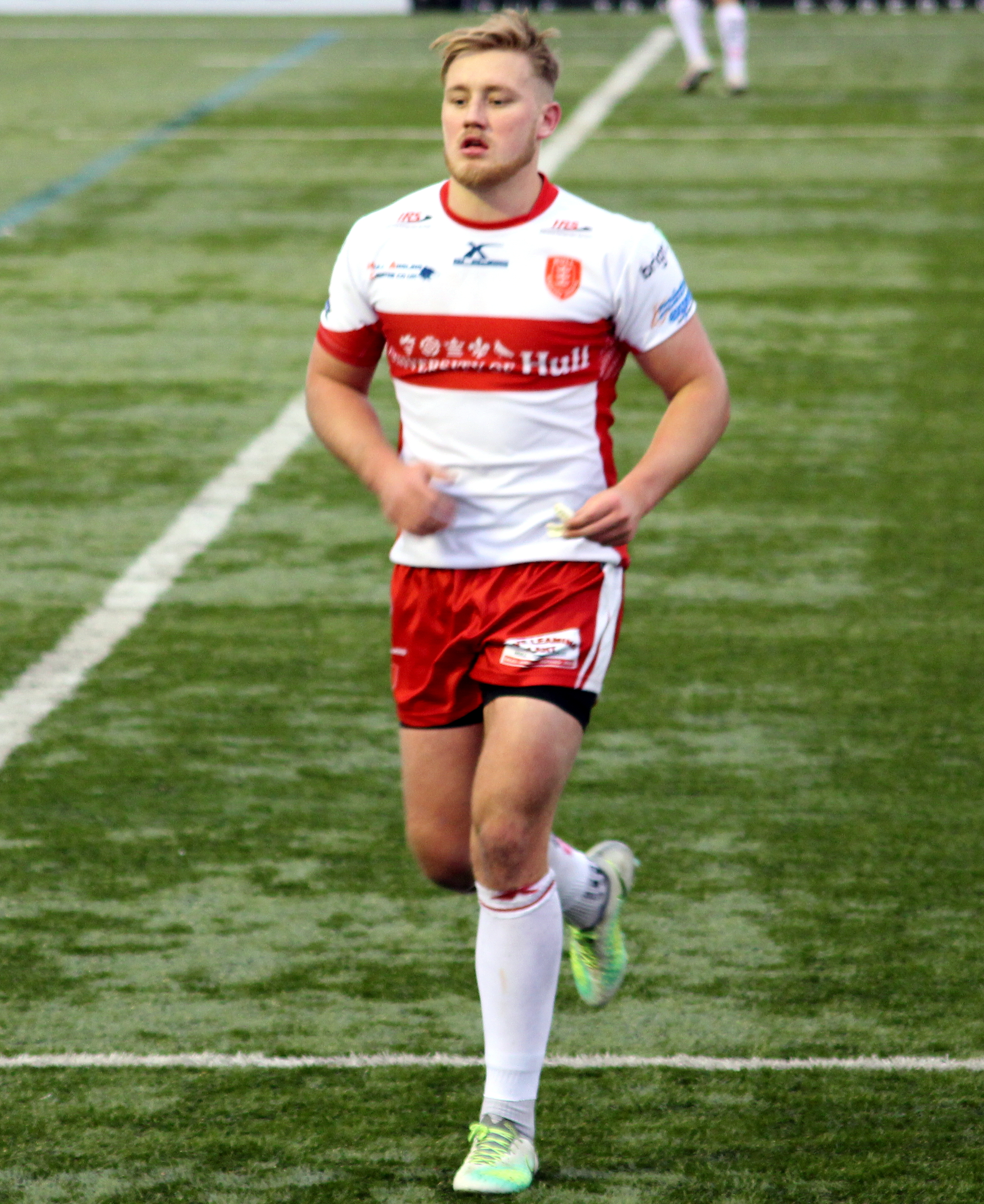

Personal information
- Full name: James David Greenwood
- Born: 7 June 1991 (age 35) Oldham, Greater Manchester, England
- Height: 6 ft 2 in (1.88 m)
- Weight: 17 st 5 lb (110 kg)

Playing information
- Position: Second-row, Prop
Club
Years	Team	Pld	T	G	FG	P
2012–13	South Wales Scorpions	8	5	0	0	20
2013–15	Wigan Warriors	3	0	0	0	0
2013(loan)	→ South Wales Scorpions	15	6	0	0	24
2014(loan)	→ London Broncos	16	3	0	0	12
2015(DR)	→ Workington Town	3	0	0	0	0
2015(loan)	→ Salford Red Devils	3	1	0	0	4
2015(loan)	→ Hull Kingston Rovers	12	0	0	0	0
2016–19	Hull Kingston Rovers	80	22	0	0	88
2020–23	Salford Red Devils	14	4	0	0	16
2023(loan)	→ Barrow Raiders	1	0	0	0	0
2023(loan)	→ Swinton Lions	1	1	0	0	4
2024–25	Barrow Raiders	37	6	0	0	24
	Total	193	48	0	0	192
- Source: As of 2 November 2025
- Relatives: Joe Greenwood (brother)

James Greenwood (born 7 June 1991) is an English semi-professional rugby league footballer who last played as a second-row and prop for the Barrow Raiders in the RFL Championship.

He has previously played for the South Wales Scorpions in League 1, Wigan Warriors in the Super League, spending time on loan from Wigan in South Wales in League 1, the London Broncos, Salford Red Devils and Hull Kingston Rovers in the Super League and Workington Town in the Championship. Greenwood also played for Hull Kingston Rovers in the Super League.

== Background ==
Greenwood was born in Oldham, Greater Manchester, England.

=== Personal life ===
He is the brother of fellow rugby league footballer, Joe Greenwood.

== Early career ==
Greenwood started his amateur playing career at the Saddleworth Rangers and he is a product of the Wigan Warriors' Academy System.

== Senior career ==
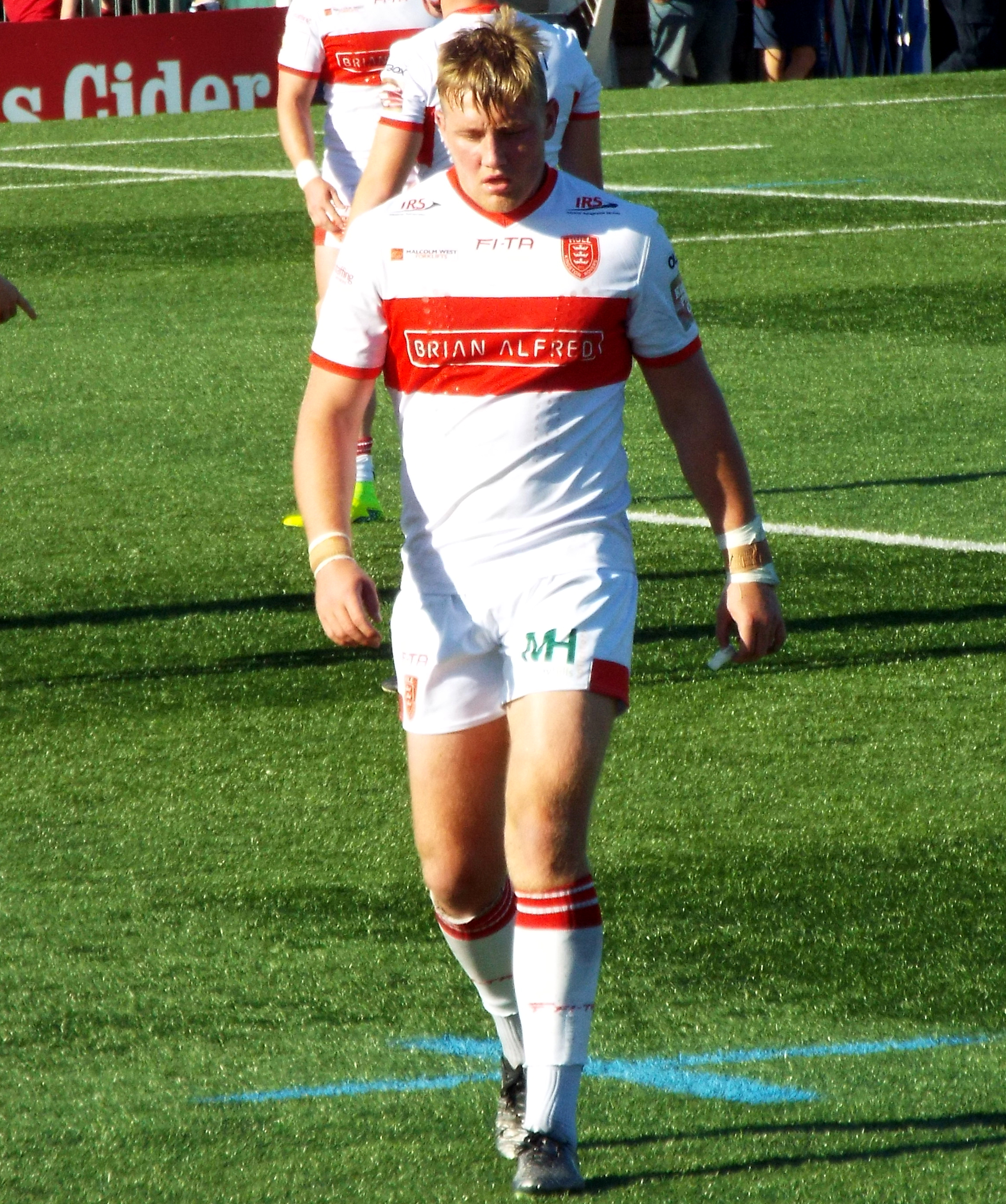
Greenwood playing for Hull Kingston Rovers in 2016

=== South Wales Scorpions ===
==== 2012 ====
In 2012, he played for League 1 side the South Wales Scorpions, Greenwood only appeared sporadically for the club.

==== 2013 ====
He returned to the Scorpions in the 2013 rugby league season on a loan basis.

=== Wigan Warriors ===
==== 2013 ====
In 2013, Greenwood was transferred to the Wigan Warriors, where he was then subsequently loaned back to his former club the South Wales Scorpions shortly after.

=== London Broncos ===
==== 2014 ====
In 2014, from his parent-club the Wigan Warriors he was loaned out again to the then Super League outfit the London Broncos, where he regularly played for them as a prop.

=== Workington Town ===
==== 2015 ====
He spent time on loan at Workington Town in 2015, as part of a dual-registration agreement.

=== Salford Red Devils ===
==== 2015 ====
In 2015, Greenwood was loaned to Salford for a short period of time.

=== Hull Kingston Rovers ===
==== 2015 ====
Greenwood was sent out once again on loan from the Wigan Warriors in 2015, this time to Hull Kingston Rovers, where he impressed enough to turn his loan-deal from the Wigan Warriors into a full-time two-year contract.

==== 2016 & 2017 ====
Greenwood suffered relegation from the Super League with Hull Kingston Rovers in the 2016 season, due to losing the Million Pound Game at the hands of Salford.

12-months later however, Greenwood was part of the Hull Kingston Rovers' side that won promotion back to the Super League, at the first time of asking following relegation the season prior.

==== 2018 ====
Greenwood made 23 appearances for Hull KR in all competitions as the club finished 10th on the table and avoided relegation.

==== 2019 ====
On 14 March, Greenwood was taken from the field during round 5 of the 2019 Super League season against Wakefield Trinity. He was later ruled out for the entire year after scans revealed he ruptured his anterior cruciate knee ligament.

=== Salford Red Devils ===
==== 2020 ====
In 2020, Greenwood joined Salford and later played for the club in their 2020 Challenge Cup Final defeat against Leeds.

=== Barrow Raiders ===
On 29 November 2023 it was reported that he had signed for Barrow Raiders in the RFL Championship on a one-year deal.

On 1 November 2025 it was reported that he had left Barrow Raiders
