= Dane Tilse =

Australian rugby league footballer

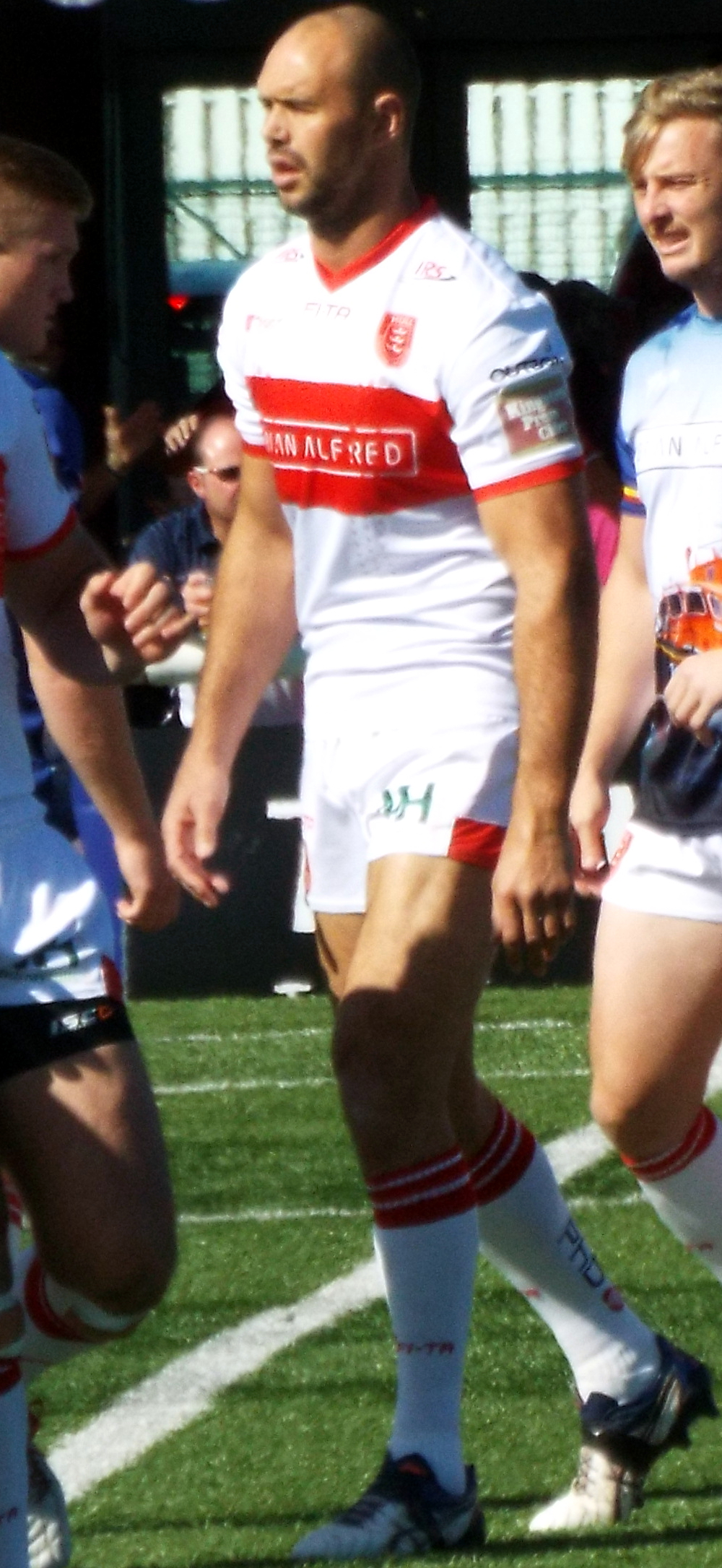

Personal information
- Born: 24 January 1985 (age 41) Scone, New South Wales, Australia

Playing information
- Height: 2 m (6 ft 7 in)
- Weight: 112 kg (17 st 9 lb)
- Position: Prop
Club
Years	Team	Pld	T	G	FG	P
2004	Newcastle Knights	3	0	0	0	0
2006–15	Canberra Raiders	201	12	0	0	48
2015–16	Hull Kingston Rovers	48	4	0	0	12
	Total	252	16	0	0	60

Dane Tilse (born 24 January 1985, in Scone, New South Wales) is an Australian former professional rugby league footballer who last played for Hull Kingston Rovers in the Super League. He previously played for the Canberra Raiders in the National Rugby League. His position of choice is at prop. At 200 cm (6 ft 7 in) tall, Tilse was one of the tallest players in the NRL.

== Playing career ==
Tilse made his first grade debut for Newcastle in Round 15 2004 against the Sydney Roosters which ended in a 48–4 loss.

Tilse joined the Canberra Raiders in 2006. Tilse went on to play over 200 games for Canberra and featured in four finals campaigns for the club.

On 1 April 2015, Tilse signed a 2 1/2 year contract with Hull Kingston Rovers.

On 3 September 2017, Tilse came out of retirement to play for the Newcastle Knights in their Intrust Super Premiership NSW elimination finals match against North Sydney. Newcastle won the match 40–18.

== Termination ==
Tilse and other Newcastle Knights players were involved in a drunken incident in Bathurst, New South Wales in 2005 in which a 19-year-old woman was sexually assaulted. Although no official complaint was made and police did not lay any charges, the Newcastle board sacked Tilse and issued fines totalling A$50,000 against 12 players over the incident at Charles Sturt University for breaching the club curfew. Tilse was also de-registered by the NRL for a period of twelve months.

Amidst the controversy, the Knights terminated 20-year-old Dane Tilse's contract for conduct "contrary and prejudicial to the club and the NRL".

Tilse later apologised for his part in the drunken rampage.
