= Iain Thornley =

English rugby league & union footballer

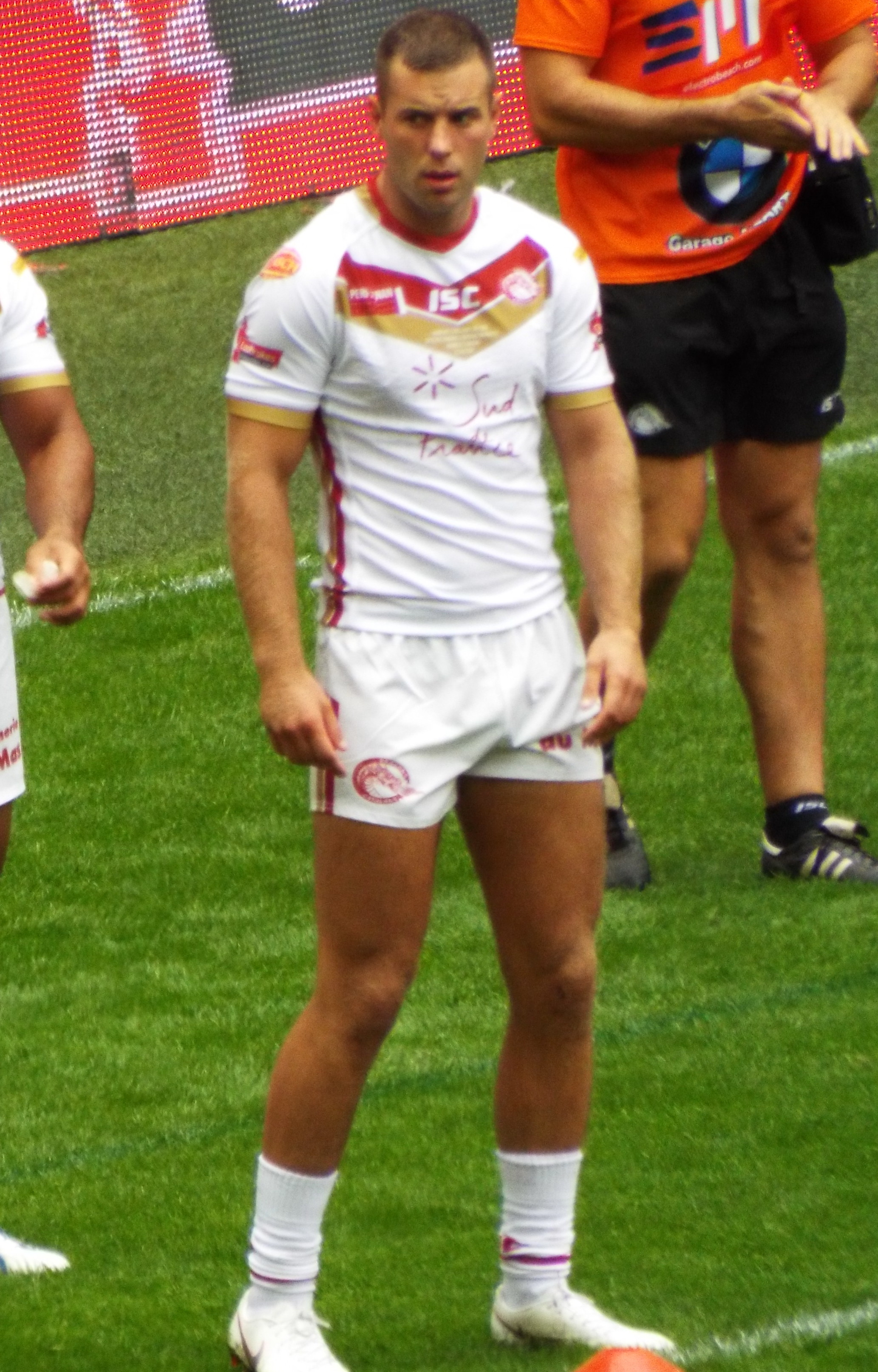

Personal information
- Born: 11 September 1991 (age 35) Wigan, Greater Manchester, England

Playing information
- Height: 6 ft 6 in (1.97 m)
- Weight: 17 st 5 lb (110 kg)

Rugby union
- Position: Wing
Club
Years	Team	Pld	T	G	FG	P
2009–11	Sale Sharks
2011–12	Leeds Carnegie	26	7	0	0	35
	Total	26	7	0	0	35

Rugby league
- Position: Centre, Wing
Club
Years	Team	Pld	T	G	FG	P
2012–15	Wigan Warriors	45	30	0	0	120
2013(DR)	→ S Wales Scorpions	1	0	0	0	0
2013(loan)	→ Leigh Centurions	1	0	0	0	0
2015(DR)	→ Workington Town	4	1	0	0	4
2015(loan)	→ Salford Red Devils	6	3	0	0	12
2016	Hull Kingston Rovers	30	12	0	0	48
2017–18	Catalans Dragons	38	9	0	0	36
2019–21	Leigh Centurions	58	24	0	0	96
2022–23	Wigan Warriors	13	5	0	0	20
2023(loan)	→ Barrow Raiders	1	1	0	0	4
2023(DR)	→ Oldham	1	1	0	0	4
2024	Wakefield Trinity	24	7	0	0	28
2025–26	Oldham RLFC	10	6	0	0	24
	Total	232	99	0	0	396

Iain Thornley (born 11 September 1991) is an English former rugby league footballer who last played as a centre and winger for Oldham RLFC in the RFL Championship.

He previously played for the Wigan Warriors in the Super League, and on loan from Wigan at the South Wales Scorpions in Championship 1, Leigh and Workington Town in the Championship and the Salford Red Devils in the Super League. Thornley has also played for Hull Kingston Rovers and the Catalans Dragons in the top flight.

Between 2009 and 2012 Thornley played rugby union with the Sale Sharks and Leeds Carnegie.

== Background ==
Thornley was born in Wigan, Greater Manchester, England.

== Career ==
Signed to Wigan as a teenager he was selected for the England Academy side but at age 18, he switched codes to Rugby Union to join Sale Sharks. After two seasons Thornley rejoined Wigan on a three-year contract. He played in the 2013 Challenge Cup Final victory over Hull F.C. at Wembley Stadium. He played in the 2013 Super League Grand Final victory over the Warrington Wolves at Old Trafford.

=== Wigan (re-join) ===
On 17 November 2021, it was reported that he had signed for Wigan Warriors in the Super League On 28 May 2022, he played for Wigan in their 2022 Challenge Cup Final victory over Huddersfield. In round 11 of the 2023 Super League season, Thornley made his first appearance for Wigan in eleven months and scored two tries for the club in their 14-10 loss against Hull F.C.

=== Wakefield Trinity ===
On 25 October 2023, it was confirmed that he would join Wakefield Trinity for the 2024 season on a one-year deal.

=== Oldham RLFC ===
On 12 November 2024, it was reported that he had signed for Oldham RLFC in the RFL Championship on a two-year deal.

On 14 September 2026 it was reported that he would be retiring at the end of the 2026 season
