= Liam Salter =

English rugby league footballer (born 1993)

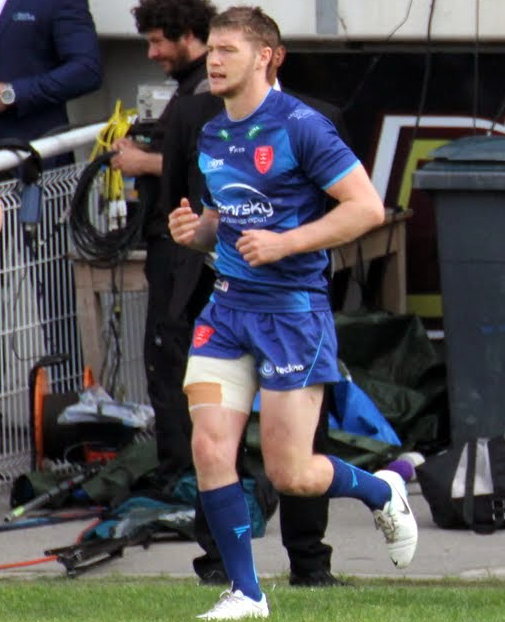

Personal information
- Born: 4 June 1993 (age 32) Kingston upon Hull, East Riding of Yorkshire, England
- Height: 6 ft 0 in (1.83 m)
- Weight: 14 st 7 lb (92 kg)

Playing information
- Position: Centre, Wing, Second-row
Club
Years	Team	Pld	T	G	FG	P
2012–18	Hull Kingston Rovers	121	22	0	0	88
2019–21	York City Knights	53	7	0	0	28
	Total	174	29	0	0	116
- Source: As of 29 December 2023

Liam Salter (born 4 June 1993) is an English professional rugby league footballer who played as a centre or in the second-row for the York City Knights in the Championship. He has previously played for Hull Kingston Rovers in the Super League.

== Background ==
Salter was born in Kingston upon Hull, East Riding of Yorkshire, England.

== Early career ==
Salter is a product of the Hull Kingston Rovers' Academy System.

== Senior career ==
=== 2012 ===
Salter made his Hull Kingston Rovers' début on the 17 March 2012, in a 20-12 Super League defeat against the Catalans Dragons at the Stade Gilbert Brutus in Perpignan, France.

=== 2015 ===
Salter represented the club in the 2015 Challenge Cup Final where they were beaten 50-0 by Leeds.

=== 2016 ===
Salter suffered relegation from the Super League with Hull Kingston Rovers in the 2016 season, due to losing the Million Pound Game at the hands of the Salford Red Devils.

=== 2017 ===
12-months later however, Salter was part of the Hull Kingston Rovers' side that won promotion back to the Super League, at the first time of asking following relegation the season prior.

=== 2018 ===
Salter as of the 2018 season was Hull Kingston Rovers' longest-serving player. It was revealed on 10 October 2018, that Salter would be departing Hull Kingston Rovers following a restructure of the club's on field personnel.

=== 2019 ===
It was revealed on 23 October 2018, that Salter had agreed a deal to play for the York City Knights in the Championship ahead of the 2019 season. Salter made his début for the York City Knights against the Toronto Wolfpack on 3 February 2019, the game played at Bootham Crescent ended in a 0-14 victory for the Canadians. Salter scored his first try for the York City Knights on 17 February 2019, in a 56-0 victory over the Barrow Raiders.
