= Matty Marsh =

English professional rugby league footballer

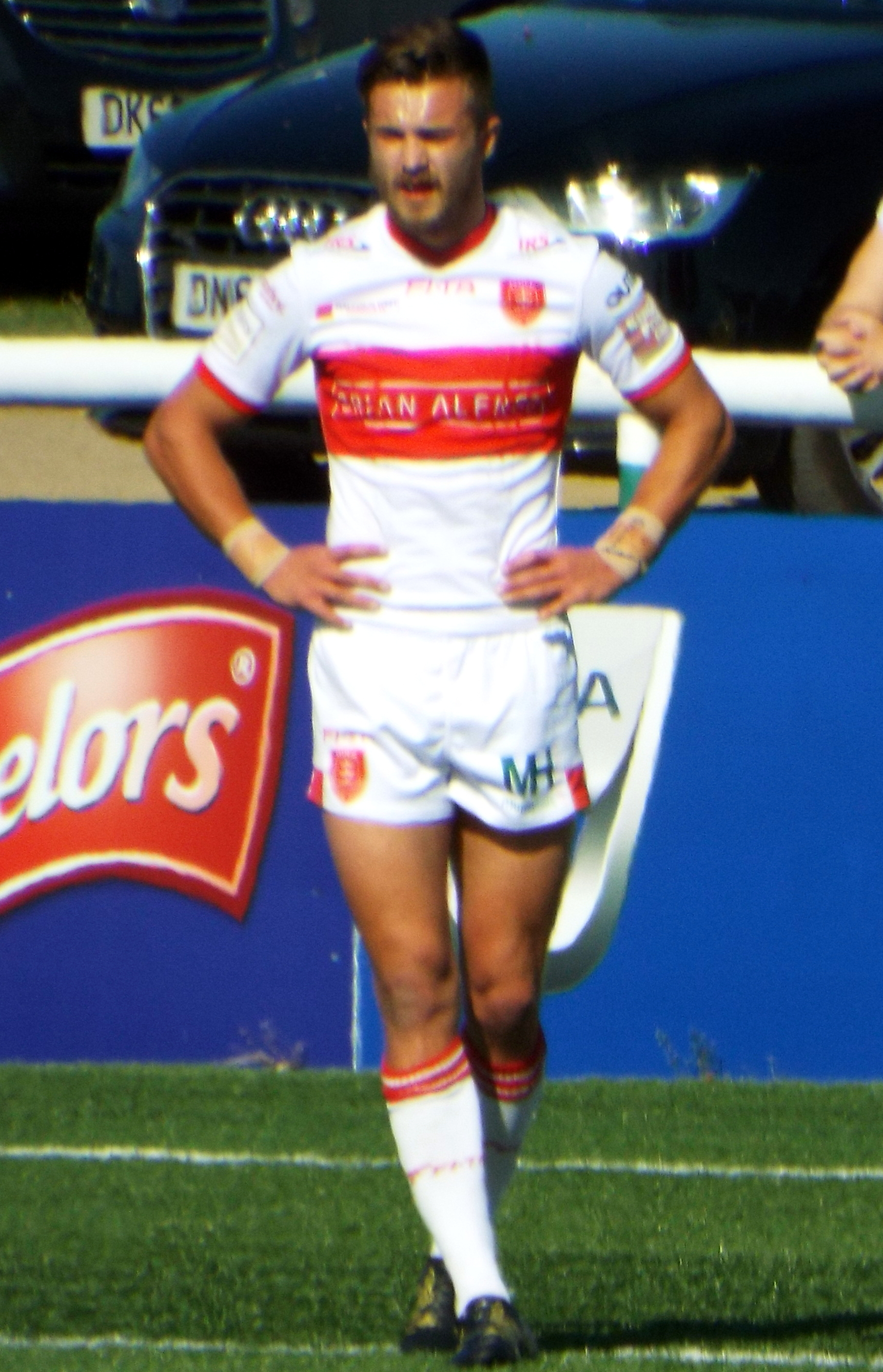

Personal information
- Full name: Matthew Marsh
- Born: 21 April 1995 (age 30) Kingston upon Hull, East Riding of Yorkshire, England
- Height: 6 ft 0 in (1.82 m)
- Weight: 12 st 11 lb (81 kg)

Playing information
- Position: Fullback, Scrum-half, Stand-off
Club
Years	Team	Pld	T	G	FG	P
2015–18	Hull Kingston Rovers	42	9	0	0	36
2015(DR)	→ Coventry Bears	1	0	0	0	0
2015(DR)	→ Newcastle Thunder	1	1	0	0	4
2018(DR)	→ York City Knights	12	9	0	0	36
2019–23	York Knights	96	54	16	1	249
2024–	Sheffield Eagles	29	19	0	0	76
	Total	181	92	16	1	401
- Source: As of 29 November 2024

Matthew "Matty" Marsh (born 21 April 1995) is an English professional rugby league footballer who plays as a fullback for the Sheffield Eagles in the Championship.

He has previously played for Hull Kingston Rovers in the Super League.

== Background ==
Marsh was born in Kingston upon Hull, East Riding of Yorkshire, England. Marsh is a product of the Hull Kingston Rovers's Academy System. He was educated at St Mary's College, Hull alongside fellow professional rugby player Josh Guzdek

== Playing career ==
=== Hull Kingston Rovers (2015-18) ===
Marsh made his Hull Kingston Rovers' début in a Super League match on 30 June 2015, against the Salford Red Devils. In 2016, after his breakout season he was awarded with the 'Young Player of the Year Award' at Hull Kingston Rovers. After the club's disappointing campaign which saw them relegated to the Championship after a ten-year stay in the Super League (2007–2016), due to losing the 2016 Million Pound Game by Salford. Marsh missed almost the entire 2017 rugby league season due to an Anterior Cruciate Ligament injury, but he returned towards the back-end of the year to help Hull Kingston Rovers gain automatic promotion back to the Super League, at the first time of asking following relegation the season prior. It was revealed on 10 October 2018, that Marsh would be departing Hull Kingston Rovers following a restructure of the club's on field personnel.

=== York City Knights (dual-registration 2018) ===
In 2018, while on dual-registration from his parent-club Hull Kingston Rovers, Marsh played a pivotal role in helping the York City Knights finish top of the League 1 competition to become Champions, to also earn promotion to the Championship for the 2019 season.

=== York City Knights (2019–2023) ===
It was revealed on 17 October 2018, that Marsh had signed a contract to play for York on a permanent basis ahead of the 2019 season. He fast established himself as one of York's key players in their 2019 Betfred Championship campaign, his excellent support play helping the team no end.

=== Dual-registration ===
In 2015, Marsh made appearances for both Newcastle Thunder and the Coventry Bears on a dual-registration basis.

=== Sheffield Eagles ===
On 6 November 2023 it was reported that he had signed for Sheffield in the RFL Championship on a two-year deal.

== Honours ==
=== Club (Hull Kingston Rovers 2015–2018) ===
- 2016: 'Young Player of the Year Award'

=== Club (York City Knights 2018) ===
- 2018: League 1 - Championship
