= Sonny Esslemont =

Scotland international rugby league footballer

Personal information
- Full name: Sonny Esslemont
- Born: 29 December 1993 (age 31) Kingston upon Hull, Humberside, England

Playing information
- Position: Loose forward
Club
Years	Team	Pld	T	G	FG	P
2014–15	Hull Kingston Rovers	6	0	0	0	0
2014(loan)	→ Gateshead Thunder	15	5	0	0	20
2015(loan)	→ Gateshead Thunder	14	1	0	0	4
2016	Keighley Cougars	5	0	0	0	0
2018	Hemel Stags	22	1	0	0	4
2019	Sheffield Eagles	18	3	0	0	12
2020–20	Dewsbury Rams	4	0	0	0	0
	Total	84	10	0	0	40
Representative
Years	Team	Pld	T	G	FG	P
2014–15	Scotland	6	0	0	0	0
- Source: As of 3 January 2021

Sonny Esslemont (born 29 December 1993) is a Scotland international rugby league footballer who plays as a loose forward.

Esslemont previously played for Hull Kingston Rovers, Keighley Cougars and the Hemel Stags, and has also represented Scotland at international level.

== Background ==
Esslemont was born in Kingston upon Hull, Humberside. He has a son called Elliot.

== Career ==
He plays as a back-rower, and was part of Hull Kingston Rovers' first team. He has come through Hull Kingston Rovers' academy, and signed a professional contract in 2012. He made his début for the club in September 2014 against Catalans Dragons.

At the end of the 2015 season, he was released by Hull KR and was signed by Keighley Cougars.

In October and November 2014, Sonny was called up to play for Scotland in their 2014 European Cup campaign. He played in all of Scotland's tournament matches.

In October and November 2015, Sonny played in the 2015 European Cup.

After playing only a handful of matches for the Cougars during the 2016 season, Esslemont left half way through the 2016 season and joined for the Hull-based amateur outfit Bransholme Dales ARLFC.

In January 2018 he joined the Hemel Stags.

=== Sheffield Eagles ===
In October 2018 Esslemont joined the Sheffield Eagles on a one-year deal.

=== Dewsbury Rams ===
On 21 September 2020 it was reported that Esslemont had signed a 1-year deal with Dewsbury Rams.
On 11 December 2020 it was reported that Esslemont had left the club due to work commitments
