= Josh Mantellato =

Italian international rugby league footballer (born 1987)

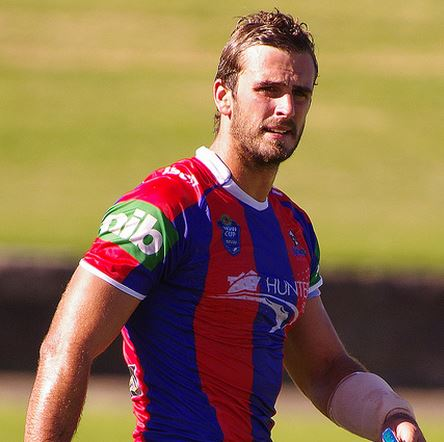
- Mantellato playing for the Knights in 2013

Personal information
- Born: 21 April 1987 (age 38) Gosford, New South Wales, Australia
- Height: 196 cm (6 ft 5 in)
- Weight: 94 kg (14 st 11 lb)

Playing information
- Position: Wing
Club
Years	Team	Pld	T	G	FG	P
2013–14	Newcastle Knights	2	1	6	0	16
2015–16	Hull Kingston Rovers	44	33	172	0	476
	Total	46	34	178	0	492
Representative
Years	Team	Pld	T	G	FG	P
2011–18	Italy	9	7	44	0	116
2013	NSW Residents	1	1	3	0	10
- Source: As of 9 January 2024

Josh Mantellato (born 21 April 1987) is a former Italy international rugby league footballer who most recently played on the wing for The Entrance Tigers in the Denton Engineering Cup. He previously played for the Wyong Roos in the Central Coast Division Rugby League competition, Newcastle Knights in the National Rugby League and Hull Kingston Rovers in the Super League.

== Background ==
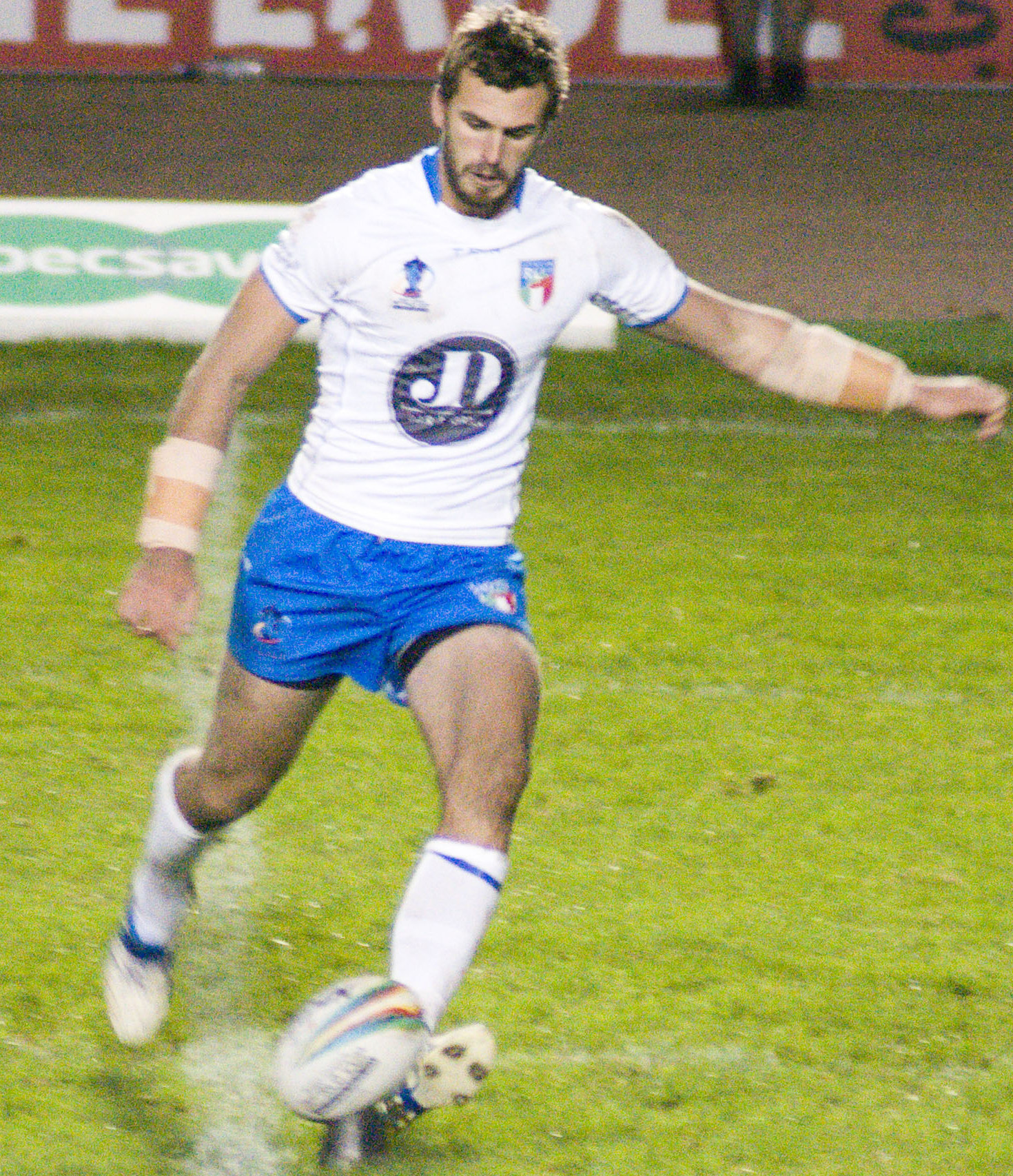
Mantellato playing for Italy in the 2013 Rugby League World Cup.

Mantellato was born in Gosford, New South Wales, Australia and is of Italian descent.

He played his junior rugby league for the Wyong Roos.

== Playing career ==
=== Early career ===
Up until 2011, Mantellato played for the Wyong Roos in the Newcastle Rugby League.

=== 2010 ===
In 2010, Mantellato made his international debut for Italy.

=== 2012 ===
In 2012, Mantellato joined the Newcastle Knights' NSW Cup team, finishing the season as the competition's highest point-scorer, with 306 points. On 12 September 2012, he was named on the wing in the 2012 NSW Cup Team of the Year. He then signed a one-year contract with the Newcastle outfit.

=== 2013 ===
In round 12 of the 2013 NRL season, Mantellato made his NRL debut for Newcastle against the South Sydney Rabbitohs. He scored a try and kicked three goals on debut. On 20 August 2013, he re-signed with the Novocastrians on a one-year contract. On 22 September 2013, he was again named on the wing in the 2013 NSW Cup Team of the Year. During 2013, he featured in Italy's successful 2013 Rugby League World Cup qualifying tournament and was selected in the 24-man squad for the World Cup campaign. On 19 October 2013, he kicked the winning field goal in Italy's 15-14 warm up game win over England.

=== 2014 ===
On 21 September 2014, Mantellato was named on the wing in the 2014 NSW Cup Team of the Year for the third year in a row.

=== 2015 ===
On 11 August 2014, Mantellato signed a three-year contract with Super League club, Hull Kingston Rovers, starting in 2015. He made his Super League debut in round 1 against the Leeds Rhinos. He kicked off his Super League points tally by kicking five goals in their 30-40 first round defeat. He scored his first two Super League tries against the Warrington Wolves in round 3.

=== 2017 ===
In January, Mantellato returned to Australia to play for Sydney Roosters feeder club, Wyong Roos on a one-year contract following the relegation of Hull Kingston Rovers to the Championship.

=== 2018 ===
Mantellato spent 2018 playing for Wyong in the Intrust Super Premiership NSW. At the end of the season it was announced that Wyong would not be competing in the competition in 2019 as the Sydney Roosters ended their agreement for Wyong to be their feeder side instead choosing foundation club North Sydney as the new feeder side.

=== 2021 ===
After exiting the Wyong Roos, Mantellato joined the Entrance Tigers for Season 2021. At the advice of medical professionals, Mantellato would go on to retire after sustaining a throat fracture.
