= Mitchell Allgood =

Australian rugby league footballer (born 1989)

Mitch Allgood
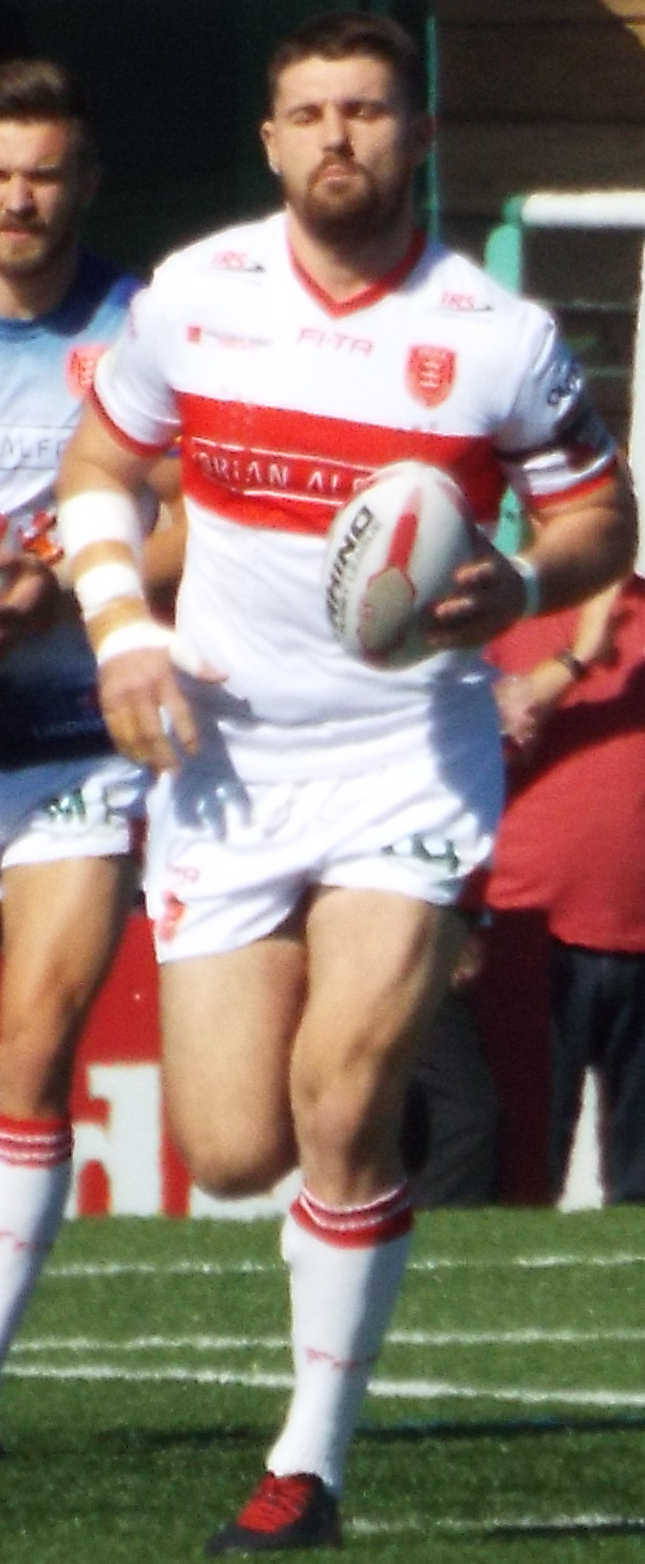

Personal information
- Full name: Mitchell Allgood
- Born: 27 April 1989 (age 36); Sydney, New South Wales, Australia
- Height: 194 cm (6 ft 4 in)
- Weight: 109 kg (17 st 2 lb)

Playing information
- Position: Prop, Lock
Club
Years	Team	Pld	T	G	FG	P
2011–14	Parramatta Eels	70	0	0	0	0
2015–16	Hull Kingston Rovers	42	6	0	0	24
2017	Wakefield Trinity	8	0	0	0	0
2018–19	St. George Illawarra	4	0	0	0	0
2020	London Broncos	1	0	0	0	0
	Total	125	6	0	0	24
Representative
Years	Team	Pld	T	G	FG	P
2012	NSW City	1	0	0	0	0
- Source: As of 21 February 2021

Mitchell Allgood (born 27 April 1989) is an Australian professional rugby league footballer who last played as a prop for the London Broncos in the Betfred Championship.

He previously played for the Parramatta Eels and the St George Illawarra Dragons in the NRL, and Hull KR and Wakefield Trinity in the Super League. He has also played for NSW City in 2012.

== Background ==
Allgood was born in Sydney, New South Wales, Australia.

== Rugby league career ==
=== Early playing career ===
Allgood played his junior football with Brothers, Penrith Junior Rugby League Club. He played in the SG Ball competition with the Penrith Panthers, before signing with Parramatta to play in the Toyota Cup. In 2008, Allgood signed a two-year deal with Parramatta after great form in the Toyota Cup.

=== 2011-2014: Parramatta Eels ===
Allgood made his NRL début in round 1 2011 against the New Zealand Warriors. He only missed 1 game in his rookie year. He was also named the 2011 Parramatta Eels season's rookie of the year. .In 2011, Allgood re-signed with Parramatta until 2013. In 2013, Allgood was sin binned after punching Manly player Steve Matai and later suspended for two games. Allgood claims he was challenged by Matai on the field and said it was a case of "hit or be hit".

In September 2013, Allgood was pulled over by police and charged with drink driving. It was alleged Allgood had been drinking with other Parramatta players as part of the club's Mad Monday celebrations. On 18 December 2013, Allgood was handed a two-year good behaviour bond by the magistrate.

On 2 June 2014 Allgood was suspended for two games after being found guilty of a dangerous throw on Penrith player Josh Mansour.

=== 2015-2016 Hull Kingston Rovers ===
On 22 November 2014, Allgood signed a three-year contract with Hull Kingston Rovers, starting from 2015.

=== 2017- Wakefield Trinity ===
On 4 December 2016, Allgood signed for Wakefield Trinity on a 1-year deal following the relegation of Hull Kingston Rovers. Allgood was given the jersey number 10 by Chris Chester & John Kear

=== 2018-2019 St George Illawarra Dragons ===
On 6 November 2017, Allgood signed for the St George Illawarra Dragons on a one-year deal. At the end of the season he re- signed with the Dragons until the end of 2019.

Allgood made his debut for St George in round 16 of the 2019 NRL season against the Melbourne Storm at WIN Stadium. In November 2019, it was announced that Allgood had been released by the club.

=== London Broncos ===
On 31 January 2020, Allgood signed a contract to join the London Broncos for the 2020 season.

== Representative career ==
Allgood was named in the 2012 New South Wales City team to replace Keith Galloway on the bench.

== Controversy ==
In September 2013, Allgood was pulled over by police and charged with a drink driving offence. It was alleged Allgood had been drinking with other Parramatta players as part of the club's Mad Monday celebrations. On 18 December 2013 Allgood was handed a two-year good behaviour bond by the magistrate.
