= Terry Campese =

Australia & Italy international rugby league footballer

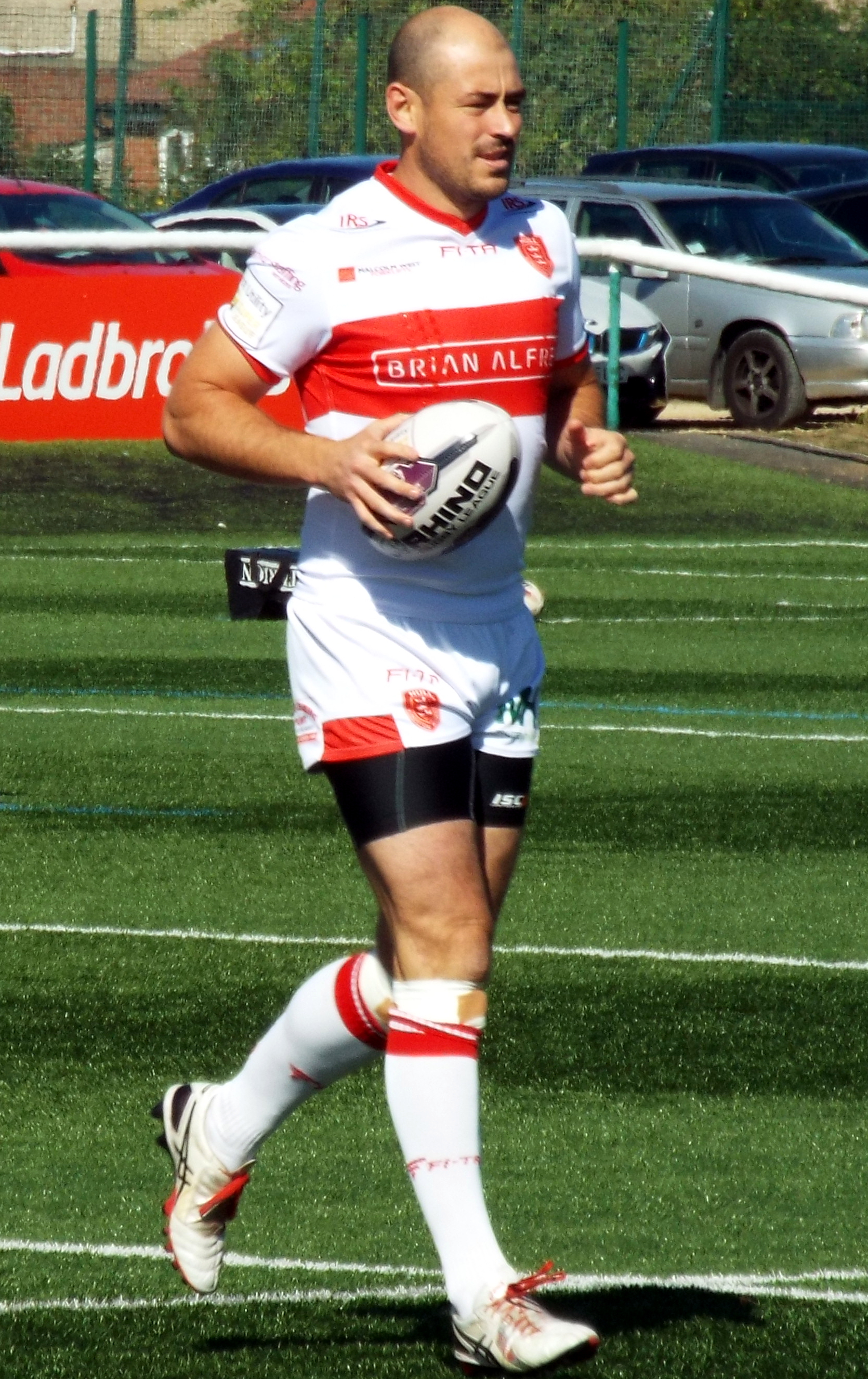

Personal information
- Full name: Terry Campese
- Born: 4 August 1984 (age 42) Queanbeyan, New South Wales, Australia

Playing information
- Height: 184 cm (6 ft 0 in)
- Weight: 102 kg (16 st 1 lb)
- Position: Five-eighth, Halfback, Lock
Club
Years	Team	Pld	T	G	FG	P
2004–14	Canberra Raiders	139	24	124	1	345
2015–16	Hull Kingston Rovers	26	2	4	0	16
	Total	165	26	128	1	361
Representative
Years	Team	Pld	T	G	FG	P
2008	Australia	1	0	0	0	0
2008–09	Prime Minister's XIII	2	0	1	0	2
2009	New South Wales	1	0	0	0	0
2009	NSW Country	1	0	0	0	0
2016	Italy	3	2	13	0	34

Terry Campese (born 4 August 1984) is a professional rugby league coach who is the head coach of the Townsville Blackhawks in the Queensland Cup and a former professional rugby league footballer.

A former Australia, Italy and New South Wales State of Origin representative five-eighth, he is also the nephew of rugby union player David Campese. He previously played for the Canberra Raiders in the National Rugby League and Hull Kingston Rovers in the Super League.

== Early life ==
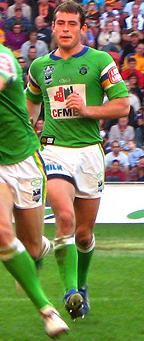
Campese in action for Canberra

Campese was born in Queanbeyan, New South Wales, Australia. He is of Italian descent.

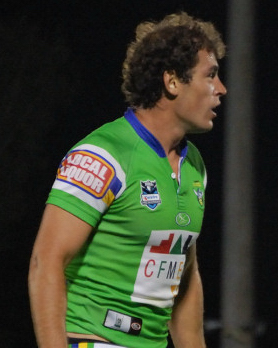
Campese playing for the Raiders in 2008

He grew up playing both league and union and always believed he would follow his uncle David in the 15-man code. However the advice of Neil Henry helped persuade him to join the Canberra Raiders youth set-up and turn down offers from Randwick DRUFC and the Brumbies Academy.

== Playing career ==
Campese made his first-grade début during the 2004 season, appearing 4 times. He made a further 5 appearances in 2005, playing at five-eighth or lock. Injury destroyed his campaign the following year and in 2007 Campese struggled to show consistent form, playing 12 games as Canberra preferred to use Todd Carney at five-eighth and Michael Dobson at halfback. After Dobson departed two games into the 2008 season, Carney shifted to half back and Campese was given an opportunity to stake a claim at five-eighth.

The turning point in the career of Campese came two thirds of the way into the 2008 season when his halves partner and friend Todd Carney was released for disciplinary reasons. Campese scored 36 points in round 22 against the Panthers with 10 goals and 4 tries. He had a chance to equal Mal Meninga's record of 38 points with a simple kick from in front of the goal posts but decided against the opportunity with the train of thought that he had not yet made a name for himself fitting of such a prestigious club record. Canberra won the game, 74–12. He assumed the goal kicking duties and became the side's main attacking point as Canberra finished the season second only to Champion's Manly in point scoring. He finished the season first in line-break assists (25) and 4th in try assists (25), and added 10 tries and 40 goals.

He was also his club's top point scorer for the 2008 NRL season.

In 2009, Campese was named in the City vs Country game and State of Origin.

Then in 2010, Campese was named co-captain with Alan Tongue. As Tongue had many injuries during the year, Campese was one of only a few senior players in the side. He helped lead the Raiders into the finals at 7th position. Campese led the Raiders to their first semifinal victory in 10 years with a win over the Penrith Panthers, but were knocked out a week later by the Wests Tigers. In the Tigers game, Campese went off with an injury which would see him out of action for 9 months. He returned in Round 13 of 2011 NRL season against the North Queensland Cowboys. However, he re-injured himself with a groin injury after an attempted tackle. He was out of action for the rest of the 2011 season. He returned in 2012 only to be devastated by injured again in round 7 against the Brisbane Broncos which sidelined the star for the rest of the season. Campese returned in round 6 2013 against the New Zealand Warriors at Canberra Stadium.

In December 2014, Campese was released from the final year of his contract with the Raiders to join Hull Kingston Rovers. His form had dipped toward the end of the 2014 season and new coach Ricky Stuart had relegated him to playing NSW Cup football for the Mount Pritchard Mounties.

As of 2022, Campese is the Captain-Coach of the Queanbeyan Blues RLFC.

Campese moved to play for the Eden Tigers in Group 16 in 2023, who are captain-coached by former Canberra teammate Adrian Purtell.

Late in 2023, Campese moved to North Queensland to coach the Townsville Blackhawks.

=== Representative career ===
In 2008, Campese earned selection in the Prime Minister's XIII and was subsequently named in the Australia squad for the World Cup. Campese played in one game, the group match against PNG. During the first half he suffered an eye injury, which saw him unable to finish the game as well as ruling him out of the rest of the tournament.

He was selected for Country in the City vs Country match on 8 May 2009.

In May 2009, Campese was named in the 17 man squad to represent New South Wales in the opening State of Origin match on 3 June 2009, in Melbourne. Campese was dropped after the first game which saw the Blues lose 28–18 and has not since represented New South Wales.

Campese is of Italian descent and subsequently switched his allegiance to Italy. He was named in the 24-man squad for their 2013 World Cup campaign but he later withdrew after receiving medical advice to stay in Canberra because of his knees. He rejoined the Italian National Team for the 2017 World Cup qualification.

== Non-footballing career ==
Campese set up the Terry Campese Foundation in 2012 to 'provide greater opportunities for marginalised young people in the [Canberra and Queanbeyan] community.'

He later worked as a Community Recovery Officer at Queanbeyan-Palerang Regional Council.

Campese was selected by the New South Wales Labor Party to contest the 2023 New South Wales state election for the Labor Party in the Division of Monaro. He later withdrew his candidacy.

On 4 November 2024, it was reported that he had made his wrestling debut for Slam Pro Wrestling in Canberra.

Sporting positions
Preceded by Alan Tongue	Canberra Raiders captain 2012–2014	Succeeded by Jarrod Croker
