= 2016 Bradford Bulls season =

- Championship Rank: 5th
- Play-off result: Winners
- Challenge Cup: 4th Round
- 2016 record: Wins: 21; draws: 2; losses: 10
- Points scored: For: 1170; against: 639

Team information
- Chairman: Marc Green
- Head Coach: Rohan Smith (was James Lowes)
- Captain: Adrian Purtell
- Stadium: Odsal Stadium
- Avg. attendance: 4,117
- High attendance: 6,563 vs. Leigh Centurions

Top scorers
- Tries: Kris Welham (29)
- Goals: Danny Addy (82)
- Points: Danny Addy (193)
← 2015	List of seasons	2017 →

This article details the Bradford Bulls rugby league football club's 2016 season. This was the Bulls' second season in the Championship, after narrowly missing out on promotion in the previous season's £1 Million Game which they lost 24-16 to the Wakefield Trinity Wildcats.

== Season Review ==
=== July 2015 ===
Bradford started their preparations for the 2016 season by announcing several departures from the club. The first of these were youngster Sam Bates who left to search for another club. Young hooker Nathan Conroy also moved to Championship side Dewsbury Rams whilst scrum half Adam Brook made his loan move to Keighley Cougars, a permanent one. Due to injuries prop Karl Davies retired from the sport and Dave Petersen signed for Sheffield Eagles without even playing a game for the Bulls.

=== August 2015 ===
The first signing of the new season came in the form of fullback or halfback Oscar Thomas from RFL Championship side London Broncos on a two-year deal.

=== September 2015 ===
Veteran second-row Chev Walker announced his retirement and took up a position as assistant coach under James Lowes. Furthermore centre Adam Henry was released at the end of the 2015 season after he refused a new contract. Top point scorer Ryan Shaw also left the club after signing a deal with Super League side Hull Kingston Rovers.

=== October 2015 ===
Algerian prop Samir Tahraoui signed for League 1 side Rochdale Hornets.

=== November 2015 ===
Scrum half Harry Seijka was released from his contract at the end of the season following some poor performances. Centre Chris Ulugia also signed for RFL Championship side Batley Bulldogs on loan because he could not join permanently due to visa issues. Australian prop forward Mitch Clark followed in his fathers footsteps and joined the Bulls from Doncaster. Fullback Johnny Campbell signed a two-year deal from Batley Bulldogs whilst prop forward Jonathan Walker and second row Kurt Haggerty both signed from Leigh Centurions.

=== December 2015 ===
Due to the departure of Harry Seijka, injury prone fullback Jake Mullaney also left the Bulls by mutual consent. Following this Australian second row Matt Ryan who was brought in for the Super 8's was released without being offered a new contract. Prop forward Ben Kavanagh joined on a two-year deal from Super League side Widnes Vikings.

== Milestones ==
- Round 1: Richie Mathers, Kris Welham, Ben Kavanagh, Kurt Haggerty and Johnny Walker made their debuts for the Bulls.
- Round 1: Omari Caro scored his 2nd hat-trick for the Bulls.
- Round 2: Mitch Clark and Rhys Lovegrove made their debuts for the Bulls.
- Round 2: Matty Blythe made his 50th appearance for the Bulls.
- Round 2: Lee Gaskell scored his 5th hat-trick for the Bulls.
- Round 3: Oscar Thomas and Joe Lumb made their debuts for the Bulls.
- Round 3: Kris Welham scored his 1st try and his 1st hat-trick for the Bulls.
- CCR4: Lee Gaskell made his 50th appearance for the Bulls.
- CCR4: Danny Addy scored his 25th try for the Bulls.
- CCR4: Joe Lumb scored his 1st try for the Bulls.
- Round 7: Ethan Ryan made his debut for the Bulls.
- Round 7: Kurt Haggerty and Ethan Ryan scored their 1st try for the Bulls.
- Round 8: Johnny Campbell made his debut for the Bulls.
- Round 10: Ross Oakes made his debut for the Bulls.
- Round 10: Kris Welham scored his 1st five-try haul, 1st four-try haul and 2nd hat-trick for the Bulls.
- Round 10: Alex Mellor scored his 1st try for the Bulls.
- Round 10: Omari Caro kicked his 1st goal for the Bulls.
- Round 11: Danny Addy kicked his 100th goal and reached 300 points for the Bulls.
- Round 11: Oscar Thomas and Mitch Clark scored their 1st try for the Bulls.
- Round 13: Jacob Trueman made his debut for the Bulls.
- Round 13: Oscar Thomas kicked his 1st goal for the Bulls.
- Round 14: Oscar Thomas kicked his 1st drop goal for the Bulls.
- Round 17: Kieren Moss and Lewis Charnock made their debuts for the Bulls.
- Round 17: Lewis Charnock scored his 1st try for the Bulls.
- Round 17: Danny Addy kicked his 1st drop goal for the Bulls.
- Round 5: Johnny Campbell scored his 1st try for the Bulls.
- Round 18: Kurt Haggerty kicked his 1st goal and 1st drop goal for the Bulls.
- Round 19: Joe Philbin and Stuart Howarth made their debuts for the Bulls.
- Round 19: Kieren Moss scored his 1st try for the Bulls.
- Round 21: Dane Chisholm made his debut for the Bulls.
- Round 21: Dane Chisholm scored his 1st try and kicked his 1st goal for the Bulls.
- Round 21: Ethan Ryan scored his 1st hat-trick for the Bulls.
- Round 21: Joe Philbin scored his 1st try for the Bulls.
- Round 21: Lewis Charnock kicked his 1st goal for the Bulls.
- Round 22: Adam O'Brien made his 100th appearance for the Bulls.
- Round 22: Omari Caro scored his 1st five-try haul, 1st four-try haul and 3rd hat-trick for the Bulls.
- Round 22: Omari Caro scored his 25th try and reached 100 points for the Bulls.
- Championship Shield 1: Alex Mellor scored his 1st hat-trick for the Bulls.
- Championship Shield 2: Danny Addy made his 150th appearance for the Bulls.
- Championship Shield 3: Steve Crossley made his 50th appearance for the Bulls.
- Championship Shield 3: Joe Keyes and James Bentley made their debuts for the Bulls.
- Championship Shield 3: Kris Welham scored his 2nd five-try haul, 2nd four-try haul and 3rd hat-trick for the Bulls.
- Championship Shield 3: Kris Welham scored his 25th try and reached 100 points for the Bulls.
- Championship Shield 3: Jay Pitts scored his 1st hat-trick for the Bulls.
- Championship Shield 3: Jay Pitts scored his 25th try and reached 100 points for the Bulls.
- Championship Shield 3: Steve Crossley kicked his 1st goal for the Bulls.
- Championship Shield 3: Joe Keyes scored his 1st try and kicked his 1st goal for the Bulls.
- Championship Shield 4: Danny Addy reached 400 points for the Bulls.
- Championship Shield 5: Ben Kavanagh scored his 1st try for the Bulls.
- Championship Shield 5: Ethan Ryan scored his 2nd hat-trick for the Bulls.
- Championship Shield 6: Josh Rickett and Liam Kirk made their debuts for the Bulls.
- Championship Shield 6: Ross Oakes scored his 1st try for the Bulls.
- Championship Shield 7: Adam Sidlow made his 100th appearance for the Bulls.
- Championship Shield 7: Dale Ferguson made his 50th appearance for the Bulls.
- Championship Shield 7: Ross Oakes scored his 1st hat-trick for the Bulls.
- Championship Shield 7: Kieren Moss scored his 1st four-try haul and 1st hat-trick for the Bulls.
- Championship Shield 7: Adam Sidlow kicked his 1st goal for the Bulls.
- Championship Shield SF: Alex Mellor made his 50th appearance for the Bulls.
- Championship Shield F: Adam O'Brien scored his 25th try and reached 100 points for the Bulls.
- Championship Shield F: Dane Chisholm kicked his 1st drop goal for the Bulls.

== Pre-season friendlies ==
LEGEND
Win
Draw
Loss

Bulls score is first.

Date	Competition	Vrs	H/A	Venue	Result	Score	Tries	Goals	Att	Report
24 January 2016	Pre Season	Leeds Rhinos	A	Headingley Stadium	L	12-26	Welham, O'Brien	Addy 2/2	5,896	Report
29 January 2016	Pre Season	Castleford Tigers	H	Odsal Stadium	W	26-8	Clare, Caro, Mellor, Hooley, Kirk	Addy 3/5	1,366	Report

=== Player appearances ===
- Friendly Games Only

FB=Fullback	C=Centre	W=Winger	SO=Stand Off	SH=Scrum half	P=Prop	H=Hooker	SR=Second Row	LF=Loose forward	B=Bench

No	Player	1	2
1	Oscar Thomas	FB	FB
2	Omari Caro	W	W
3	Adrian Purtell	x	x
4	Kris Welham	C	x
5	Danny Williams	W	x
6	Lee Gaskell	SO	x
8	Paul Clough	x	x
9	Adam O'Brien	H	H
10	Adam Sidlow	P	x
11	Tom Olbison	SR	SR
12	Dale Ferguson	B	SR
13	Danny Addy	SH	SH
14	Jay Pitts	B	L
15	Matty Blythe	C	C
16	Dan Fleming	B	B
17	Jean-Philippe Baile	x	x
19	Steve Crossley	x	x
20	Mitch Clark	x	x
21	Epalahame Lauaki	B	B
22	James Clare	B	W
23	Alex Mellor	L	B
24	Lucas Walshaw	B	B
25	Ben Kavanagh	P	P
26	Vila Halafihi	B	B
27	Johnny Walker	B	B
28	Kurt Haggerty	SR	P
29	Ethan Ryan	B	C
30	Joe Lumb	B	B
31	James Mendeika	x	x
32	Johnny Campbell	x	x
33	Etu Uaisele	x	x
n/a	Rhys Jacks	B	SO
n/a	Brandon Pickersgill	x	B
n/a	Dan Caprice	x	B
n/a	Luke Hooley	x	B
n/a	James Bentley	x	B
n/a	Ollie Bartle	x	B
n/a	Liam Kirk	x	B

= Injured

= Suspended

== Table ==
=== Championship ===
Pos	Club	P	W	D	L	For	Agst	Diff	Points	Qualification
1	Leigh Centurions (C)	23	21	1	1	881	410	471	43	The Qualifiers
2	London Broncos (Q)	23	17	0	6	702	444	258	34	The Qualifiers
3	Batley Bulldogs (Q)	23	15	1	7	589	485	104	31	The Qualifiers
4	Featherstone Rovers (Q)	23	15	0	8	595	384	211	30	The Qualifiers
5	Bradford Bulls (F)	23	13	2	8	717	446	271	28	Championship Shield
6	Halifax (F)	23	13	1	9	615	484	131	27	Championship Shield
7	Sheffield Eagles (F)	23	8	0	15	583	617	-34	16	Championship Shield
8	Dewsbury Rams (F)	23	8	0	15	486	603	-117	16	Championship Shield
9	Swinton Lions (F)	23	7	1	15	449	813	-364	15	Championship Shield
10	Oldham R.L.F.C. (F)	23	7	0	16	401	678	-277	14	Championship Shield
11	Workington Town (F)	23	5	1	17	455	756	-301	11	Championship Shield
12	Whitehaven (F)	23	5	1	17	367	720	-335	11	Championship Shield

C = Champions

Q = Qualified for the qualifiers

F = Unable to qualify for the qualifiers

=== Championship Shield ===
Pos	Club	P	W	D	L	For	Agst	Diff	Points	Qualification
1	Bradford Bulls (Q)	30	19	2	9	997	570	507	40	PlayOffs
2	Halifax (Q)	30	16	1	13	775	656	139	33	PlayOffs
3	Sheffield Eagles (Q)	30	12	0	18	855	763	12	24	PlayOffs
4	Dewsbury Rams (Q)	30	12	0	18	646	797	-133	24	PlayOffs
5	Swinton Lions (S)	30	10	1	19	596	1001	-427	21	Season Complete
6	Oldham R.L.F.C. (S)	30	10	0	20	523	888	-383	20	Season Complete
7	Whitehaven (R)	30	8	1	21	571	945	-365	17	Relegation to 2017 League 1
8	Workington Town (R)	30	7	1	22	541	919	-394	15	Relegation to 2017 League 1

(Q) = Qualified for Play-offs

(S) = Secured spot in Championship

(R) = Relegated to League 1

== Fixtures and results ==
LEGEND
Win
Draw
Loss

=== Championship fixtures ===
Date	Competition	Rnd	Vrs	H/A	Venue	Result	Score	Tries	Goals	Att	Live on TV	Report
7 February 2016	Championship	1	Featherstone Rovers	H	Odsal Stadium	W	22-12	Caro (3), Gaskell	Addy 3/4	4,518	-	Report
13 February 2016	Championship	2	Whitehaven RLFC	A	Recreation Ground	W	46-10	Gaskell (3), Pitts (2), Clare, Ferguson, O'Brien	Addy 7/8	878	-	Report
20 February 2016	Championship	3	Swinton Lions	A	Sedgley Park	W	48-16	Welham (3), Olbison (2), Blythe, Caro, Clare, Gaskell	Addy 6/9	880	-	Report
28 February 2016	Championship	4	Leigh Centurions	H	Odsal Stadium	D	32-32	Clare (2), Addy, Caro, Purtell, Welham	Addy 4/6	6,563	-	Report
13 March 2016	Championship	6	Batley Bulldogs	A	Mount Pleasant	D	24-24	Pitts (2), Caro, Ferguson	Addy 4/4	2,742	-	Report
25 March 2016	Championship	7	London Broncos	H	Odsal Stadium	W	28-20	Haggerty (2), Blythe, Clare, Ryan	Addy 4/7	4,163	-	Report
28 March 2016	Championship	8	Halifax RLFC	A	The Shay	L	10-14	Clare, Uaisele	Addy 1/2	4,108	-	Report
3 April 2016	Championship	9	Sheffield Eagles	H	Odsal Stadium	L	28-46	Addy, Caro, Clare, Gaskell, Welham	Addy 4/5	4,234	-	Report
10 April 2016	Championship	10	Dewsbury Rams	A	Rams Stadium	W	52-18	Welham (5), Caro (2), Clare, Gaskell, Mellor	Addy 3/5, Caro 3/4, Gaskell 0/1	1,954	-	Report
24 April 2016	Championship	11	Workington Town	H	Odsal Stadium	W	52-16	Caro (2), Williams (2), Clare, Clark, Ferguson, Purtell, Thomas, Welham	Addy 6/10	3,467	-	Report
1 May 2016	Championship	12	London Broncos	A	Ealing Trailfinders	L	16-30	Welham (2), Addy	Addy 2/4	1,524	-	Report
15 May 2016	Championship	13	Swinton Lions	H	Odsal Stadium	W	54-8	Caro (2), Clare (2), Addy, Gaskell, Olbison, Sidlow, Thomas, Welham	Addy 6/9, Thomas 1/1	4,152	-	Report
20 May 2016	Championship	14	Sheffield Eagles	A	Sheffield Hallam University	W	25-14	Sidlow, Thomas, Welham, Williams	Addy 4/4, Thomas 1 DG	995	-	Report
28 May 2016	Summer Bash	15	Leigh Centurions	N	Bloomfield Road	L	20-24	Addy, Clark, O'Brien, Williams	Addy 1/3, Thomas 1/1	9,521	-	Report
5 June 2016	Championship	16	Dewsbury Rams	H	Odsal Stadium	L	14-16	O'Brien, Pitts	Addy 3/4	4,303	-	Report
12 June 2016	Championship	17	Workington Town	A	Derwent Park	W	29-22	Charnock, Clare, O'Brien, Ryan, Sidlow	Addy 4/5, Addy 1 DG	723	-	Report
15 June 2016	Championship	5	Oldham R.L.F.C.	A	Whitebank Stadium	W	48-4	Clare (2), Campbell, Charnock, Clark, Mellor, O'Brien, Pitts, Thomas	Thomas 6/8, Haggerty 0/1	1,051	-	Report
19 June 2016	Championship	18	Batley Bulldogs	H	Odsal Stadium	W	17-16	Clare (2), Pitts	Haggerty 2/4, Haggerty 1 DG	4,617	-	Report
26 June 2016	Championship	19	Halifax RLFC	H	Odsal Stadium	L	24-32	Haggerty, Moss, Ryan, Welham	Addy 4/4	5,270	-	Report
3 July 2016	Championship	20	Leigh Centurions	A	Leigh Sports Village	L	20-22	Caro, Clare, Mellor, Moss	Addy 2/4	5,111	-	Report
10 July 2016	Championship	21	Whitehaven RLFC	H	Odsal Stadium	W	64-18	Ryan (3), Chisholm (2), Moss (2), Clare, Crossley, Philbin, Sidlow	Addy 5/5, Charnock 3/3, Chisholm 2/3	4,168	-	Report
17 July 2016	Championship	22	Oldham R.L.F.C.	H	Odsal Stadium	W	44-12	Caro (5), Haggerty, Philbin, Ryan, Welham	Addy 1/3, Charnock 3/5, Chisholm 0/1	4,235	-	Report
24 July 2016	Championship	23	Featherstone Rovers	A	Post Office Road	L	0-20	-	-	5,454	-	Report

=== Championship Shield ===
Date	Competition	Rnd	Vrs	H/A	Venue	Result	Score	Tries	Goals	Att	Live on TV	Report
7 August 2016	Championship	S1	Whitehaven RLFC	A	Recreation Ground	W	46-18	Mellor (3), Addy, Blythe, Haggerty, Moss, Welham, Williams	Addy 3/4, Charnock 2/5	675	-	Report
14 August 2016	Championship	S2	Halifax RLFC	H	Odsal Stadium	W	44-22	Moss (2), Welham (2), Mellor, Pitts, Purtell, Williams	Charnock 6/8	3,498	-	Report
21 August 2016	Championship	S3	Oldham R.L.F.C.	H	Odsal Stadium	W	82-0	Welham (5), Pitts (3), Chisholm (2), Keyes, Lauaki, Olbison, Ryan, Williams	Keyes 10/14, Crossley 1/1	3,022	-	Report
29 August 2016	Championship	S4	Dewsbury Rams	A	Rams Stadium	W	36-26	Williams (2), Chisholm, Clark, Pitts, Ryan, Welham	Keyes 2/5, Addy 2/2	1,807	-	Report
4 September 2016	Championship	S5	Swinton Lions	H	Odsal Stadium	W	46-28	Ryan (3), O'Brien (2), Chisholm, Kavanagh, Pitts	Keyes 7/8	4,030	-	Report
11 September 2016	Championship	S6	Workington Town	A	Derwent Park	L	26-30	Clark, Ferguson, Moss, Oakes, Ryan	Keyes 3/5	596	-	Report
18 September 2016	Championship	S7	Sheffield Eagles	H	Odsal Stadium	W	80-0	Moss (4), Oakes (3), Chisholm (2), Ryan (2), Charnock, Olbison, Pitts, Sidlow	Charnock 5/7, Chisholm 4/7, Sidlow 1/1	4,035	-	Report
25 September 2016	Championship	SF	Dewsbury Rams	H	Odsal Stadium	W	36-22	Mellor (2), Chisholm, Moss, Ryan, Welham, Williams	Charnock 4/7	2,189	-	Report

== Player appearances ==
- Championship Only

FB=Fullback	C=Centre	W=Winger	SO=Stand-off	SH=Scrum half	PR=Prop	H=Hooker	SR=Second Row	L=Loose forward	B=Bench

No	Player	1	2	3	4	6	7	8	9	10	11	12	13	14	15	16	17	5	18	19	20	21	22	23	-	S1	S2	S3	S4	S5	S6	S7	SF
1	Oscar Thomas	x	x	FB	x	B	x	x	FB	x	FB	C	SH	SH	SO	SO	x	SO	x	x	SO	x	x	x	-	x	x	x	x	x	x	x	x
2	Omari Caro	W	W	W	W	W	W	W	W	W	W	W	W	W	W	W					W		W	W	-								
3	Adrian Purtell	C	C	C	C				SH	SH	SO														-		C						
4	Kris Welham	C	C	C	C	C			C	C	C	C	C	C	C	C	C	C	C	C	C	C	C	C	-	C	C	C	C	C	x	C	C
5	Danny Williams										W	W	W	W	W	W			W						-	W	W	W	W	W	x	W	W
6	Lee Gaskell	SO	SO	SO	SO	SO	SO	SO	SO	SO			SO	SO											-								
7	Dane Chisholm	x	x	x	x	x	x	x	x	x	x	x	x	x	x	x	x	x	x	x	x	SH	SH	SH	-	SH	SH	SH	SH	SH	x	SH	SH
8	Paul Clough					P	P	P	P	P	P	P	P	P			B		L	P					-								
9	Adam O'Brien	H	H	H	H	H	H	H	H	B	H	B	H	H	B	B	H	H	H	H	B	B	B	x	-	H	H	H	H	H	B	H	H
10	Adam Sidlow	P	P	P	P							B	P	P	P	B	P	P	P	P	P	P	P	P	-	P	P	P	P	P	B	P	P
11	Tom Olbison	SR	P	P	SR		SR	SR	B	B	SR	SR	SR	SR	SR	SR		L	B		L		B	B	-	B	B	L	B	B	L	L	B
12	Dale Ferguson	B	SR	SR	B	SR		B	SR	SR	B	SR		B	SR	SR	SR						SR	L	-					B	B	B	L
13	Danny Addy	SH	SH	SH	SH	SH	SH	SH	L	L	SH	SH	L	L	H	H	SH			SH	SH	L	L	H	-	L	L	SR	L	L	SH	SR	SR
14	Jay Pitts	L	L	L	L	L	L	L	B	SR	L	L	SR	SR	L	L	L	B	SR	L	B	B		B	-	SR	B	SR	SR	SR	SR	SR	SR
15	Matty Blythe	B	B	B	B	C	C						C	C	C					C	C	C		C	-	W	W						
16	Dan Fleming	x	x	x	x	x	B	B	B	P	P	x	x	x	x	x	x	x	x	x	x	x	x	x	-	x	x	x	x	x	x	x	x
17	Jean-Philippe Baile	x	x	x	x	x	x	B	x	x	x	x	x	x	x	x	x	x	x	x	x	x	x	x	-	x	x	x	x	x	x	x	x
19	Steve Crossley	x	x	x	x	B	P	B	P		B	P	B	B	B	P		P	B	B		B	P		-	B	P	B	x	x	x	x	x
20	Mitch Clark	x	B	B	B	B	B	P	B	B	B	B		B	P	P	P	B	P						-			B	B	B	P	B	B
21	Epalahame Lauaki	B														B	B		B		B		B		-	B		B	B				
22	James Clare	W	W	W	W	W	C	C	C	FB	C	FB	FB	FB	FB	FB	W	FB	W	W	W	W	C	x	-								
23	Alex Mellor	x	B	SR	x	B	B	x	x	B	B	B	B		B		SR	SR	SR	SR	B	SR		SR	-	C	SR	C	C	C	C	C	C
24	Lucas Walshaw	x	x	x	x	x	x	x	x	x	x	x	x	x	x	C	x	C	C	x	x	x	x	x	-	x	x	x	x	x	x	x	x
25	Ben Kavanagh	P											B							B	P	P		P	-	P	B	P	P	P	P	P	P
26	Vila Halafihi	x	x	x	x	x	x	x	x	x	x	x	x	x	x	x	x	x	x	x	x	x	x	x	-	x	x	x	x	x	x	x	x
27	Johnny Walker	B	x	x	B	x	x	x	x	x	x	x	x	x	x	x	x	B	x	x	x	x	x	x	-	x	x	x	x	x	x	x	x
28	Kurt Haggerty	SR	SR		SR	SR	SR	SR	SR		SR	SO	Red card	Red card	B	B	B	SR	SO	SR	SR	SR	SR	SR	-	SR	SR		SR	SR	SR	Red card	Red card
29	Ethan Ryan	x	x	x	x	x	W	x	x	W	x	x	x	x	x	x	W	W	x	W	x	W	W	W	-			W	W	W	W	W	W
30	Joe Lumb	x	x	B	x	x	B	x	x	H	x	H	x	B	x	x	B	B	B	x	x	x	x	x	-	x	x	x	B	x	x	x	x
31	James Mendeika	x	x	x	x	x	x	x	x	x	x	x	x	x	x	x	x	x	x	x	x	x	x	x	-	x	x	x	x	x	x	x	x
32	Johnny Campbell							W	W									W	x	x	x	x	x	x	-	x	x	x	x	x	x	x	x
33	Etu Uaisele	x	x	x	x	x	x	C	x	x	x	x	x	x	x	x	x	x	x	x	x	x	x	x	-	x	x	x	x	x	x	x	x
34	Richie Mathers	FB	FB	x	FB	FB	FB	FB							SH	SH									-	x	x	x	x	x	x	x	x
35	Rhys Lovegrove	x	B	B	P	P																			-								
37	Ross Oakes	x	x	x	x	x	x	x	x	C	x	x	x	x	x	x	C	x	x	x	x	x	x	x	-	x	x	x	x	x	C	B	B
38	Jacob Trueman	x	x	x	x	x	x	x	x	x	x	x	B	x	x	x	x	x	x	x	x	x	x	x	-	x	x	x	x	x	x	x	x
39	Kieren Moss	x	x	x	x	x	x	x	x	x	x	x	x	x	x	x	FB		FB	FB	FB	FB	FB	FB	-	FB	FB	FB	FB	FB	FB	FB	FB
40	Lewis Charnock	x	x	x	x	x	x	x	x	x	x	x	x	x	x	x	SO	SH	SH	SO		SO	SO	SO	-	SO	SO	x	x	x	x	SO	SO
41	Joe Philbin	x	x	x	x	x	x	x	x	x	x	x	x	x	x	x	x	x	x	B	SR	B	B	B	-	x	x	x	x	x	x	x	x
42	Stuart Howarth	x	x	x	x	x	x	x	x	x	x	x	x	x	x	x	x	x	x	B	H	H	H	B	-	B	B	x	x	B	H	x	x
43	Joe Keyes	x	x	x	x	x	x	x	x	x	x	x	x	x	x	x	x	x	x	x	x	x	x	x	-	x	x	SO	SO	SO	SO	x	x
44	James Bentley	x	x	x	x	x	x	x	x	x	x	x	x	x	x	x	x	x	x	x	x	x	x	x	-	x	x	B	x	x	x	x	x
45	Josh Rickett	x	x	x	x	x	x	x	x	x	x	x	x	x	x	x	x	x	x	x	x	x	x	x	-	x	x	x	x	x	W	x	x
46	Liam Kirk	x	x	x	x	x	x	x	x	x	x	x	x	x	x	x	x	x	x	x	x	x	x	x	-	x	x	x	x	x	B	B	B

= Injured

= Suspended

== Championship Shield Final ==
After finishing 1st in the Middle 8's and beating Dewsbury Rams in the Semi Final the Bulls qualified for the Championship Shield Final, Sheffield Eagles finished 4th in the table and beat Halifax in the Semi Final meaning that the two teams would meet in a play-off match to determine who would win the Championship Shield.

LEGEND
Win
Draw
Loss

Date	Competition	Vrs	H/A	Venue	Result	Score	Tries	Goals	Att	Live on TV	Report
2 October 2016	Championship Shield	Sheffield Eagles	H	Odsal Stadium	W	27-16	O'Brien (2), Welham (2), Purtell	Charnock 3/5, Chisholm 1 DG	3,518	-	Report

2016 Championship Shield Final
Bradford Bulls	positions	Sheffield Eagles
39. Kieren Moss	Fullback	1. Quentin Laulu-Togagae
5. Danny Williams	Winger	19. Garry Lo
23. Alex Mellor	Centre	3. Menzie Yere
4. Kris Welham	Centre	4. George Tyson
3. Adrian Purtell	Winger	2. Rob Worrincy
40. Lewis Charnock	Stand off	6. Cory Aston
7. Dane Chisholm	Scrum half	24. Rhys Jacks
10. Adam Sidlow	Prop	15. Scott Wheeldon
9. Adam O'Brien	Hooker	9. Keale Carlile
25. Ben Kavanagh	Prop	16. Adam Neal
13. Danny Addy	2nd Row	12. Duane Straughier
28. Kurt Haggerty	2nd Row	13. Matt James
14. Jay Pitts	Loose forward	18. Elliot Minchella
11. Tom Olbison	Interchange	8. Steve Thorpe
12. Dale Ferguson	Interchange	14. Matty Fozard
20. Mitch Clark	Interchange	17. Mark Mexico
37. Ross Oakes	Interchange	-. Thibault Margalet
Rohan Smith	Coach	Mark Aston

== Challenge Cup ==
LEGEND
Win
Draw
Loss

Date	Competition	Rnd	Vrs	H/A	Venue	Result	Score	Tries	Goals	Att	TV	Report
18 March 2016	Cup	4th	Dewsbury Rams	A	Rams Stadium	L	30-31	Blythe (2), Addy, Caro, Lumb, Olbison	Addy 3/6	2,021	-	Report

=== Player appearances ===
- Challenge Cup Games only

FB=Fullback	C=Centre	W=Winger	SO=Stand Off	SH=Scrum half	P=Prop	H=Hooker	SR=Second Row	L=Loose forward	B=Bench

No	Player	4
1	Oscar Thomas	SH
2	Omari Caro	W
3	Adrian Purtell	
4	Kris Welham	C
5	Danny Williams	
6	Lee Gaskell	SO
8	Paul Clough	P
9	Adam O'Brien	x
10	Adam Sidlow	
11	Tom Olbison	SR
12	Dale Ferguson	SR
13	Danny Addy	H
14	Jay Pitts	L
15	Matty Blythe	C
16	Dan Fleming	x
17	Jean-Philippe Baile	x
19	Steve Crossley	B
20	Mitch Clark	B
21	Epalahame Lauaki	x
22	James Clare	FB
23	Alex Mellor	B
24	Lucas Walshaw	x
25	Ben Kavanagh	
26	Vila Halafihi	x
27	Johnny Walker	x
28	Kurt Haggerty	x
29	Ethan Ryan	x
30	Joe Lumb	B
31	James Mendeika	
32	Johnny Campbell	
33	Etu Uaisele	W
34	Richie Mathers	x
35	Rhys Lovegrove	P

== Squad statistics ==
- Appearances and points include (Super League, Challenge Cup and Play-offs) as of 2 October 2016.

No	Player	Position	Age	Previous club	Apps	Tries	Goals	DG	Points
1	Oscar Thomas	Fullback	22	London Broncos	12	4	8	1	33
2	Omari Caro	Wing	25	Hull Kingston Rovers	19	20	3	0	86
3	Adrian Purtell	Centre	31	Penrith Panthers	9	4	0	0	16
4	Kris Welham	Centre	29	Hull Kingston Rovers	30	29	0	0	116
5	Danny Williams	Wing	29	Salford Red Devils	15	10	0	0	40
6	Lee Gaskell	Stand-off	25	St Helens R.F.C.	12	8	0	0	32
7	Dane Chisholm	Stand-off	26	Canterbury Bulldogs	11	9	6	1	49
8	Paul Clough	Prop	28	St Helens R.F.C.	13	0	0	0	0
9	Adam O'Brien	Hooker	22	Bradford Bulls Academy	31	9	0	0	36
10	Adam Sidlow	Prop	28	Salford Red Devils	26	5	1	0	22
11	Tom Olbison	Second-row	24	Bradford Bulls Academy	29	6	0	0	24
12	Dale Ferguson	Second-row	27	Huddersfield Giants	22	4	0	0	16
13	Danny Addy	Loose forward	25	Bradford Bulls Academy	31	7	82	1	193
14	Jay Pitts	Second-row	26	Hull F.C.	32	14	0	0	56
15	Matty Blythe	Centre	27	Warrington Wolves	16	5	0	0	20
16	Dan Fleming	Prop	23	Castleford Tigers	5	0	0	0	0
17	Jean-Philippe Baile	Centre	28	Catalans Dragons	1	0	0	0	0
19	Steve Crossley	Prop	25	Castleford Tigers	19	1	1	0	6
20	Mitch Clark	Prop	N/A	Doncaster	24	5	0	0	20
21	Epalahame Lauaki	Prop	32	Wigan Warriors	9	1	0	0	4
22	James Clare	Wing	25	Castleford Tigers	23	18	0	0	72
23	Alex Mellor	Second-row	21	Bradford Bulls Academy	26	9	0	0	36
24	Lucas Walshaw	Second-row	23	Wakefield Trinity Wildcats	3	0	0	0	0
25	Ben Kavanagh	Prop	28	Widnes Vikings	15	1	0	0	4
26	Vila Halafihi	Hooker	22	Penrith Panthers	0	0	0	0	0
27	Johnny Walker	Prop	25	Leigh Centurions	3	0	0	0	0
28	Kurt Haggerty	Second-row	27	Leigh Centurions	25	5	2	1	25
29	Ethan Ryan	Centre	20	Bradford Bulls Academy	14	16	0	0	64
30	Joe Lumb	Hooker	20	Bradford Bulls Academy	10	1	0	0	4
31	James Mendeika	Centre	24	Featherstone Rovers	0	0	0	0	0
32	Johnny Campbell	Fullback	24	Batley Bulldogs	3	1	0	0	4
33	Etu Uaisele	Wing	31	Featherstone Rovers	2	1	0	0	4
34	Richie Mathers	Fullback	32	Retirement	8	0	0	0	0
35	Rhys Lovegrove	Prop	33	London Broncos	5	0	0	0	0
37	Ross Oakes	Centre	20	Bradford Bulls Academy	6	4	0	0	16
38	Jacob Trueman	Scrum-half	17	Bradford Bulls Academy	1	0	0	0	0
39	Kieren Moss	Fullback	22	Parramatta Eels	16	13	0	0	52
40	Lewis Charnock	Scrum-half	21	St Helens R.F.C. (Loan)	12	3	26	0	64
41	Joe Philbin	Second-row	21	Warrington Wolves (Loan)	5	2	0	0	8
42	Stuart Howarth	Hooker	26	Wakefield Trinity Wildcats (Loan)	9	0	0	0	0
43	Joe Keyes	Stand-off	20	London Broncos	4	1	22	0	48
44	James Bentley	Loose forward	18	Bradford Bulls Academy	1	0	0	0	0
45	Josh Rickett	Wing	18	Bradford Bulls Academy	1	0	0	0	0
46	Liam Kirk	Prop	18	Bradford Bulls Academy	3	0	0	0	0

= Injured = Suspended

== Transfers in/out ==
=== In ===
	Name	Position	Signed from	Date
(England)	Oscar Thomas	Scrum-half	London Broncos	August 2015
(Australia)	Mitch Clark	Prop	Doncaster	November 2015
(England)	Johnny Campbell	Fullback	Batley Bulldogs	November 2015
(England)	Jonathan Walker	Prop	Leigh Centurions	November 2015
(England)	Kurt Haggerty	Prop	Leigh Centurions	November 2015
(England)	Ben Kavanagh	Prop	Widnes Vikings	December 2015
(England)	Richie Mathers	Fullback	Retirement	January 2016
(Australia)	Kieren Moss	Fullback	Parramatta Eels	June 2016
(England)	Lewis Charnock	Scrum-half	St Helens R.F.C. (Loan)	June 2016
(England)	Joe Philbin	Second-row	Warrington Wolves (Loan)	June 2016
(England)	Stuart Howarth	Hooker	Wakefield Trinity Wildcats (Loan)	June 2016
(England)	Joe Keyes	Scrum-half	London Broncos	July 2016
(Australia)	Dane Chisholm	Scrum-half	Canterbury Bulldogs	July 2016

=== Out ===
	Name	Position	Club Signed	Date
(England)	Sam Bates	Prop	Dewsbury Rams	June 2015
(England)	Nathan Conroy	Hooker	Dewsbury Rams	July 2015
(England)	Adam Brook	Scrum-half	Keighley Cougars	July 2015
(England)	Dave Petersen	Loose forward	Sheffield Eagles	July 2015
(Australia)	Karl Davies	Prop	Retirement	July 2015
(England)	Chev Walker	Loose forward	Retirement	September 2015
(New Zealand)	Adam Henry	Centre	Released	September 2015
(England)	Ryan Shaw	Fullback	Hull Kingston Rovers	September 2015
(Algeria)	Samir Tahraoui	Prop	Rochdale Hornets	October 2015
(Australia)	Harry Siejka	Scrum-half	Released	November 2015
(New Zealand)	Chris Ulugia	Centre	Batley Bulldogs	November 2015
(Australia)	Jake Mullaney	Fullback	Released	December 2015
(Australia)	Matt Ryan	Second-row	Released	December 2015
(Australia)	Dane Neilsen	Centre	South Sydney Rabbitohs	January 2016
