= 2013 Hull Kingston Rovers season =

- Super League XVIII Rank: 6th
- Play-off result: N/A
- Challenge Cup: 5th Round
- 2013 record: Wins: 14; draws: 0; losses: 15
- Points scored: For: 664; against: 836

Team information
- Chairman: Neil Hudgell
- Head Coach: Craig Sandercock
- Captain: Michael Dobson
- Stadium: New Craven Park
- Avg. attendance: 7519
- High attendance: 7864

Top scorers
- Tries: David Hodgson - 14
- Goals: Michael Dobson - 88
- Points: Michael Dobson - 201
| ← 2012 | 2014 → |

This article details the Hull Kingston Rovers rugby league football club's 2013 season. This is the 18th season of the Super League era.

== Pre season friendlies ==
LEGEND
| Win |
| Draw |
| Loss |

Hull KR score is first.

| Date | Competition | Vrs | H/A | Venue | Result | Score | Tries | Goals | Att | Report |
|---|---|---|---|---|---|---|---|---|---|---|
| 13/1/2013 | Pre Season | Warriors | H | Craven Park | W | 32-10 | Caro (2), Withers, Eden, Paea, Salter | Dobson 3/5, Salter 1/1 | N/A | Report |
| 20/1/2013 | Pre Season | Hull F.C. | A | KC Stadium | W | 28-18 | Caro, Hall, Paterson, Eden (2) | Dobson 3/4, Withers 1/1 | 9,887 | Report |

== Table ==
Super League XVIII
| Pos | Team | Pld | W | D | L | PF | PA | PD | Pts | Qualification |
|---|---|---|---|---|---|---|---|---|---|---|
| 1 | Huddersfield Giants (L) | 27 | 21 | 0 | 6 | 851 | 507 | +344 | 42 | Play-offs |
| 2 | Warrington Wolves | 27 | 20 | 1 | 6 | 836 | 461 | +375 | 41 | Play-offs |
| 3 | Leeds Rhinos | 27 | 18 | 1 | 8 | 712 | 507 | +205 | 37 | Play-offs |
| 4 | Wigan Warriors (C) | 27 | 17 | 1 | 9 | 816 | 460 | +356 | 35 | Play-offs |
| 5 | St. Helens | 27 | 15 | 1 | 11 | 678 | 536 | +142 | 31 | Play-offs |
| 6 | Hull F.C. | 27 | 13 | 2 | 12 | 652 | 563 | +89 | 28 | Play-offs |
| 7 | Catalans Dragons | 27 | 13 | 2 | 12 | 619 | 604 | +15 | 28 | Play-offs |
| 8 | Hull Kingston Rovers | 27 | 13 | 0 | 14 | 642 | 760 | −118 | 26 | Play-offs |
| 9 | Bradford Bulls | 27 | 10 | 2 | 15 | 640 | 658 | −18 | 22 | |
| 10 | Widnes Vikings | 27 | 10 | 2 | 15 | 695 | 841 | −146 | 22 | |
| 11 | Wakefield Trinity Wildcats | 27 | 10 | 1 | 16 | 660 | 749 | −89 | 21 | |
| 12 | Castleford Tigers | 27 | 9 | 2 | 16 | 702 | 881 | −179 | 20 | |
| 13 | London Broncos | 27 | 5 | 2 | 20 | 487 | 946 | −459 | 12 | |
| 14 | Salford City Reds | 27 | 6 | 1 | 20 | 436 | 953 | −517 | 11 (Note: Salford deducted 2 points on 14 June 2013 for fielding 14 players during home game against Castleford) | |

Source: superleague.co.uk and BBC Sport
Rules for classification: 1st on competition points; 2nd on match points difference. Competition points: for win = 2; for draw = 1; for loss = 0.
(C) Champions; (L) League Leaders' Shield Winners

== 2013 fixtures and results ==
LEGEND
| Win |
| Draw |
| Loss |

2013 Engage Super League

| Date | Competition | Rnd | Vrs | H/A | Venue | Result | Score | Tries | Goals | Att | Live on TV | Report |
|---|---|---|---|---|---|---|---|---|---|---|---|---|
| 3/2/13 | Super League XVIII | 1 | Dragons | H | Craven Park | L | 24-32 | Dobson, J.Hodgson, Caro, Withers | Dobson 4/4 | 7,864 | - | Report |
| 9/2/13 | Super League XVIII | 2 | Wakefield Trinity Wildcats | A | Belle Vue | L | 20-36 | Paterson, Hall, J.Hodgson, D.Hodgson | Dobson 2/4 | 9,237 | Sky Sports | Report |
| 17/2/13 | Super League XVIII | 3 | Vikings | H | Craven Park | W | 44-18 | Dobson, Caro, Ferguson, Welham, Horne, Eden, Heil, Hall | Dobson 6/8 | 7,247 | - | Report |
| 24/2/13 | Super League XVIII | 4 | Salford City Reds | A | City of Salford Stadium | L | 34-38 | D.Hodgson, Dobson (2), Caro, Eden (2) | Dobson 5/6 | - | Sky Sports | Report |
| 3/3/13 | Super League XVIII | 5 | Wolves | H | Craven Park | W | 26-12 | D.Hodgson (2), Paterson, Brown | Dobson 5/5 | 7,446 | - | Report |
| 9/3/13 | Super League XVIII | 6 | Broncos | A | Twickenham Stoop | W | 42-22 | Welham (2), Brown (3), Eden, Salter, Paterson | Dobson 5/9 | 1,837 | Sky Sports | Report |
| 17/3/13 | Super League XVIII | 7 | Bulls | A | Odsal Stadium | L | 12-34 | D.Hodgson, J.Hodgson | Dobson 2/2 | 7,843 | - | Report |
| 22/3/13 | Super League XVIII | 8 | Tigers | H | Craven Park | W | 26-22 | Burns, Welham, D.Hodgson, J.Hodgson, Hall | Burns 3/6 | 6,489 | Sky Sports | Report |
| 29/3/13 | Super League XVIII | 9 | Hull FC | A | KC Stadium | W | 23-10 | J.Hodgson, D.Hodgson (2), Welham | Hall 3/5, Hall 1 DG | 19,064 | Sky Sports | Report |
| 1/4/13 | Super League XVIII | 10 | Warriors | H | Craven Park | L | 6-84 | Eden | Hall 1/1 | 7,894 | - | Report |
| 7/4/13 | Super League XVIII | 11 | Saints | H | Craven Park | W | 22-14 | D.Hodgson, J.Hodgson, Paterson, Brown | Hall 3/4 | 7,616 | - | Report |
| 14/4/13 | Super League XVIII | 12 | Giants | A | Galpharm Stadium | L | 30-50 | Hall, Eden (2), Mika, D.Hodgson | Dobson 5/5 | 5,641 | - | Report |
| 28/4/13 | Super League XVIII | 13 | Rhinos | H | Craven Park | L | 10-44 | Paterson, Caro | Dobson 1/2 | 8,122 | - | Match Report |
| 5/5/13 | Super League XVIII | 14 | Tigers | A | The Jungle | L | 24-32 | Lovegrove, Salter (2), Caro | Dobson 4/4 | 6,474 | - | Report |
| 19/5/13 | Super League XVIII | 15 | Wakefield Trinity Wildcats | H | Craven Park | W | 44-18 | Horne (2), George (2), Hall, Lovegrove (2), Mika | Dobson 6/8 | 6,933 | - | Report |
| 25/5/13 | Magic Weekend | 16 | Hull FC | N | Etihad Stadium | L | 16-22 | Eden, Hall, Brown | Dobson 2/3 | 30,793 | Sky Sports | Report |
| 2/6/13 | Super League XVIII | 17 | Bulls | H | Craven Park | W | 28-18 | Lovegrove (2), Withers (2), Hall | Dobson 4/5 | 7,259 | - | Report |
| 7/6/13 | Super League XVIII | 18 | Giants | H | Craven Park | W | 35-28 | Burns (2), Brown (2), Horne, Mika | Dobson 5/6, Dobson 1 DG | 6,963 | - | Report |
| 22/6/13 | Super League XVIII | 19 | Dragons | A | Stade Gilbert Brutus | W | 22-21 | Eden (3), J.Hodgson | Dobson 3/4 | 12,000 | - | Report |
| 28/6/13 | Super League XVIII | 20 | Saints | A | Langtree Park | W | 24-12 | Burns, Brown, Eden | Dobson 6/7 | 10,820 | - | Report |
| 7/7/13 | Super League XVIII | 21 | Salford City Reds | H | Craven Park | W | 28-18 | Paterson (2), Dobson, Hall, Burns | Dobson 4/5 | 6,974 | - | Report |
| 21/7/13 | Super League XVIII | 22 | Wolves | A | Halliwell Jones Stadium | L | 6-34 | Cox | Dobson 1/1 | - | - | Report |
| 2/8/13 | Super League XVIII | 23 | Warriors | A | DW Stadium | L | 16-21 | Eden, Dobson, Tuimavave | Dobson 2/3 | 12,194 | - | Report |
| 11/8/13 | Super League XVIII | 24 | Hull FC | H | Craven Park | L | 20-38 | Salter, Walker, Tuimavave | Dobson 4/4 | 8,874 | Sky Sports | Report |
| 16/8/13 | Super League XVIII | 25 | Rhinos | A | Headingley Stadium | W | 16-12 | Cox, Lovegrove | Dobson 4/4 | 14,868 | Sky Sports | Report |
| 1/2/13 | Super League XVIII | 26 | Vikings | A | Halton Stadium | L | 22-36 | D.Hodgson (3), J.Hodgson | Dobson 3/4 | 5,713 | - | Report |
| 8/2/13 | Super League XVIII | 27 | Broncos | H | Craven Park | L | 22-34 | Guzdek, Hall, Caro, Welham | Hall 3/4 | 7,749 | - | Report |

== Challenge Cup ==
LEGEND
| Win |
| Draw |
| Loss |

| Date | Competition | Rnd | Vrs | H/A | Venue | Result | Score | Tries | Goals | Att | TV | Report |
|---|---|---|---|---|---|---|---|---|---|---|---|---|
| 20/4/13 | Cup | 4th | Saints | H | Craven Park | W | 26-18 | Hall (2), Paea, Eden, Salter | Dobson 3/5 | 4,454 | BBC Sport | Report |
| 12/5/13 | Cup | 5th | Warriors | H | Craven Park | L | 14-46 | D.Hodgson, Hall (2) | Dobson 1/3 | 4,280 | - | Report |

== Playoffs ==
LEGEND
| Win |
| Draw |
| Loss |

| Date | Competition | Rnd | Vrs | H/A | Venue | Result | Score | Tries | Goals | Att | TV | Report |
|---|---|---|---|---|---|---|---|---|---|---|---|---|
| 14/9/2013 | Play-offs | QF | Saints | A | Langtree Park | L | 10-46 | Salter, Hall | Dobson 1/2 | 9,926 | Sky Sports | Report |

== 2013 transfers in/out ==
In

| | Name | Position | Signed from | Date |
|---|---|---|---|---|
| (Australia) | Cory Paterson | Second Row | North Queensland Cowboys | June 2012 |
| (England) | Sean Gleeson | Centre | Salford City Reds | July 2012 |
| (New Zealand) | Evarn Tuimavave | Prop | Newcastle Knights | July 2012 |
| (Australia) | Travis Burns | Stand Off | Penrith Panthers | September 2012 |
| (England) | Omari Caro | Wing | London Broncos | September 2012 |
| (England) | Alex Brown | Wing | Batley Bulldogs | October 2012 |
| (England) | Adam Walker | Prop | Huddersfield Giants | November 2012 |
| (England) | Greg Eden | Fullback | Huddersfield Giants | November 2012 |

Out

| | Name | Position | Club Signed | Date |
|---|---|---|---|---|
| (England) | Scott Wheeldon | Prop | London Broncos | April 2012 |
| (England) | Liam Watts | Prop | Hull F.C. | June 2012 |
| (New Zealand) | Jake Webster | Centre | Castleford Tigers | June 2012 |
| (Australia) | Shannon McDonnell | Fullback | Released | July 2012 |
| (Australia) | Joel Clinton | Prop | Mackay Cutters | August 2012 |
| (England) | Scott Murrell | Hooker | Released | August 2012 |
| (Australia) | Blake Green | Stand Off | Wigan Warriors | September 2012 |
| (Australia) | Ben Galea | Second Row | Hull F.C. | September 2012 |
| (England) | Louis Sheriff | Wing | Redcliffe Dolphins | October 2012 |
| (England) | Jason Netherton | Second Row | Released | November 2012 |
