= Wayne Chisholm =

Australian rugby league footballer

Personal information
- Born: 1 May 1964 (age 61); Sydney, New South Wales, Australia

Playing information
- Position: Second-row, Lock
Club
Years	Team	Pld	T	G	FG	P
1984	Manly Sea Eagles	2	0	0	0	0
1985–91	South Sydney	115	12	0	0	48
1992	North Sydney	2	0	0	0	0
	Total	119	12	0	0	48
Representative
Years	Team	Pld	T	G	FG	P
1989	NSW City	1	0	0	0	0
- Relatives: Dane Chisholm (nephew); Rick Chisholm (brother)

Wayne Chisholm (born 1 May 1964) is an Australian former professional rugby league footballer who played for Manly–Warringah, South Sydney and North Sydney. He represented NSW City in the City vs Country Origin match in 1989.

== Biography ==
=== Career ===
From 1985 to 1991 Chisholm made 115 first-grade appearances for South Sydney, six of them in finals, including the 1989 preliminary final loss to Canberra, in which he scored two tries. He played mostly in the second-row and occasionally as a lock.

His time at South Sydney included a 10-game suspension in 1991 for tackling a referee. The incident occurred when Chisholm was trying to prevent a try from Newcastle winger John Schuster, claiming that tunnel vision had meant he hadn't seen referee Geoff Weeks. This version was dismissed by the judiciary, which concluded that Chisholm "must have seen the referee" and that the act was both deliberate and reckless.

In 1992 he spent a season with North Sydney, where he featured in only two first-grade games, but did play in the club's reserves premiership team.

=== Family ===
Chisholm's elder brother, Rick, was a halfback for Manly and Newtown during the 1980s. A nephew, Dane Chisholm, who is the son of Rick, played first-grade for the Melbourne Storm and has represented France internationally.
