= Danny Addy =

Scotland international rugby league footballer

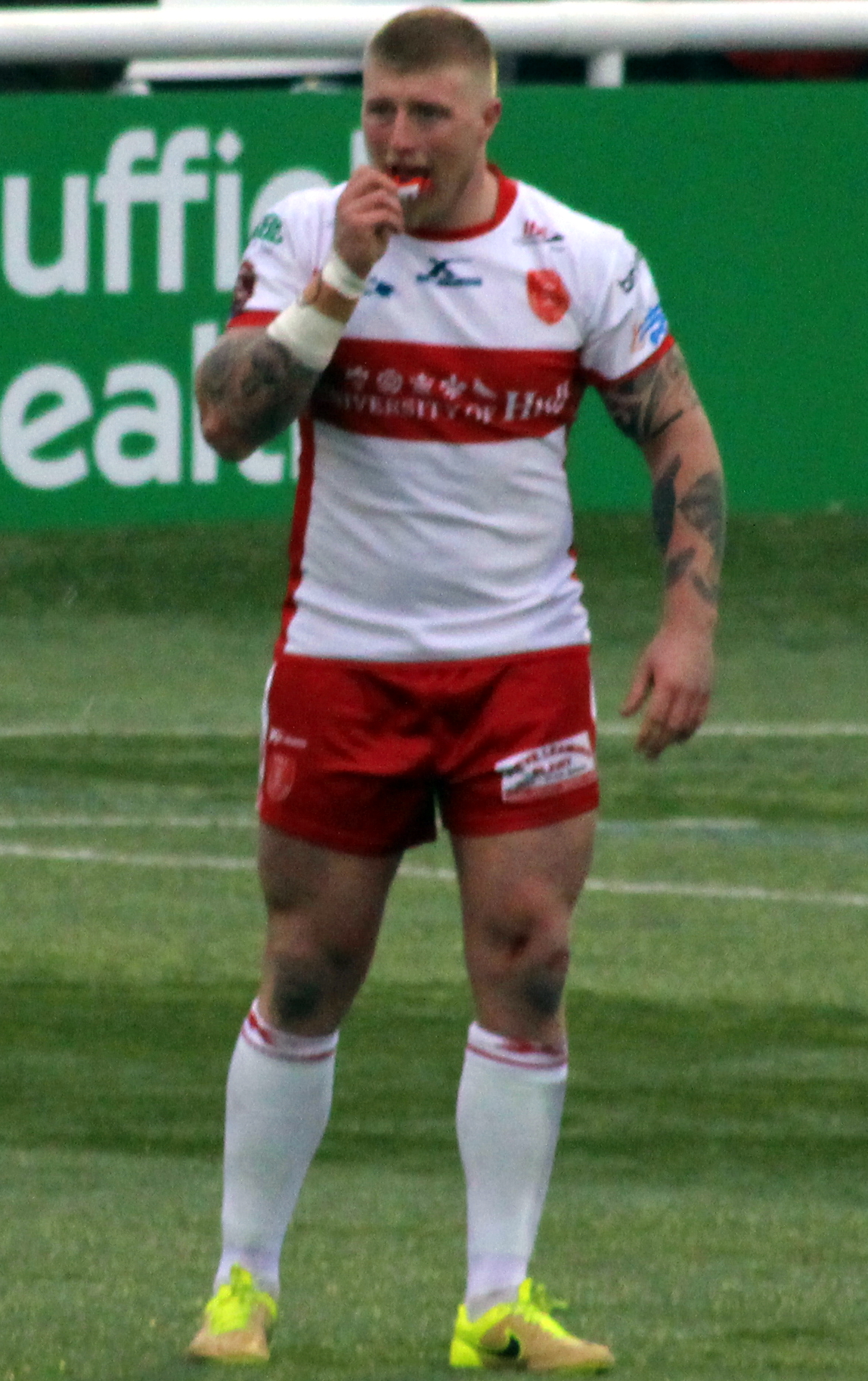

Personal information
- Full name: Daniel Richard Addy
- Born: 15 January 1991 (age 35) Pontefract, West Yorkshire, England
- Height: 5 ft 11 in (1.80 m)
- Weight: 15 st 6 lb (98 kg)

Playing information
- Position: Loose forward, Second-row, Stand-off
Club
| Years | Team | Pld | T | G | FG | P |
|---|---|---|---|---|---|---|
| 2010–16 | Bradford Bulls | 157 | 30 | 140 | 1 | 401 |
| 2010(DR) | → Dewsbury Rams | 2 | 0 | 0 | 0 | 0 |
| 2017–19 | Hull Kingston Rovers | 41 | 11 | 0 | 0 | 44 |
| 2020 | Leigh Centurions | 6 | 1 | 0 | 0 | 4 |
| 2021–23 | Salford Red Devils | 41 | 0 | 0 | 0 | 0 |
| 2022(loan) | → Widnes Vikings | 1 | 0 | 0 | 0 | 0 |
| 2024–25 | Featherstone Rovers | 58 | 10 | 35 | 0 | 110 |
| 2026 | North Wales Crusaders | 4 | 0 | 0 | 0 | 0 |
| 2026– | Dewsbury Rams | 0 | 0 | 0 | 0 | 0 |
| | Total | 310 | 52 | 175 | 1 | 559 |
Representative
| Years | Team | Pld | T | G | FG | P |
| 2013–21 | Scotland | 18 | 5 | 4 | 0 | 28 |
- Source: As of 20 November 2026

Daniel Addy (born 15 January 1991) is a Scotland international rugby league footballer who plays as a loose forward for the Dewsbury Rams in the Championship.

He has previously played for the Bradford Bulls in the Super League and the Championship, and spent time on loan from Bradford at the Dewsbury Rams in the Championship. He has also played for Hull Kingston Rovers in the Super League and the second tier, and the Leigh Centurions in the Championship. Earlier in his career he played as a stand-off, scrum-half and hooker.

== Background ==
Addy was born in Pontefract, West Yorkshire, England.

== Playing career ==
=== Early career ===
Addy is a product of the Bradford Bulls' Academy System.

=== Senior career ===
==== Bradford Bulls (2010-16) ====
===== 2010 =====
After his impressive début season with the Bradford Bulls in 2010, at the end of that same 2010 rugby league season, Addy signed a new two-year contract at the Bradford club.

===== 2012 =====
In 2012, Addy signed a one-year extension to his current Bradford contract.

===== 2013 =====
At the end of the 2013 season he signed another two-year contract extension, to stay with the Bradford club.

===== 2014 =====
Addy signed a new two-year deal with the Bradford Bulls side at the end of their 2014 campaign, despite their relegation to the Championship.

===== 2015 =====
In 2015, Addy played in the Million Pound Game against the Wakefield Trinity Wildcats, as Bradford Bulls made a bid to return to the Super League following their relegation the season prior. Their efforts came up short, as Wakefield retained their position in the Super League, by beating their Championship challengers 24-16 at Belle Vue.

===== 2016 =====
The 2016 season proved to be the last year that Addy would represent Bradford, before he joined Hull Kingston Rovers.

===== Bradford Bulls' career statistics (2010-16) =====
| Season | Appearance | Tries | Goals | F/G | Points |
|---|---|---|---|---|---|
| 2010: Bradford Bulls | 12 | 2 | 7 | 0 | 22 |
| 2011: Bradford Bulls | 14 | 0 | 0 | 0 | 0 |
| 2012: Bradford Bulls | 15 | 2 | 11 | 0 | 30 |
| 2013: Bradford Bulls | 29 | 5 | 0 | 0 | 20 |
| 2014: Bradford Bulls | 29 | 6 | 0 | 0 | 24 |
| 2015: Bradford Bulls | 27 | 8 | 39 | 0 | 110 |
| 2016: Bradford Bulls | 31 | 8 | 82 | 1 | 197 |
| Total | 157 | 31 | 139 | 1 | 403 |

==== Dewsbury Rams (2010) ====
===== 2010 =====
Addy appeared for the Dewsbury Rams in the 2010 rugby league season, as part of Bradford's dual-registration partnership with the club.

===== Dewsbury Rams' statistics (2010) =====
| Season | Appearance | Tries | Goals | F/G | Points |
|---|---|---|---|---|---|
| 2010: Dewsbury Rams | 2 | 0 | 0 | 0 | 0 |
| Total | 2 | 0 | 0 | 0 | 0 |

==== Hull Kingston Rovers (2017 - 2019) ====
===== 2017 =====
Following Bradford's liquidation, Addy signed for Hull Kingston Rovers on a two-year deal. Addy made his Hull Kingston Rovers début on 5 February 2017, in a 54-24 victory over his former club the Bradford Bulls on the opening day of the 2017 rugby league season. Addy was one of Hull Kingston Rovers standout players in their 2017 Championship campaign, playing in numerous creative positions under Head Coach, Tim Sheens. Addy was part of the Hull Kingston Rovers side that won promotion back to the Super League, at the first time of asking following relegation the season prior.

===== 2018 =====
Following Hull Kingston Rovers promotion back to the Super League for the 2018 season, Addy unfortunately suffered a season-ending anterior cruciate ligament (ACL) knee injury, in a pre-season friendly against cross-city rivals Hull F.C. Head Coach Tim Sheens who later said, "It was one of the hardest phone calls I’ve ever had to make. Having to call Danny to say we have to go without your services this year was truly heartbreaking."

===== 2019 =====
On 13 January 2019, after missing the entire 2018 Super League season, Addy made his long awaited return to the Hull Kingston Rovers fold in a pre-season friendly against Widnes, Addy claimed a 30–16 victory in his return to the side.

===== Hull Kingston Rovers' career statistics (2017 - present) =====
| Season | Appearance | Tries | Goals | F/G | Points |
|---|---|---|---|---|---|
| 2017: Hull Kingston Rovers | 19 | 8 | 0 | 0 | 32 |
| 2018: Hull Kingston Rovers | 0 | 0 | 0 | 0 | 0 |
| 2019: Hull Kingston Rovers | 17 | 3 | 0 | 0 | 12 |
| Total | 36 | 11 | 0 | 0 | 44 |

==== Leigh Centurions ====
Addy was appointed vice-captain.

==== Salford Red Devils ====
On 19 December 2020 it was announced that the Leigh vice-captain had signed for Salford

==== Featherstone Rovers ====
On 3 November 2023 it was reported that he will join hometown club Featherstone Rovers for 2024.

==== North Wales Crusaders ====
On 17 January 2026 it was reported that he had signed for North Wales Crusaders in the RFL Championship

==== Dewsbury Rams (rejoin) ====
On 19 March 2026 it was reported that he had signed for Dewsbury Rams in the RFL Championship

=== International career (2013-17) ===
==== 2013 ====
Addy was named as part of the Scotland squad for the 2013 Rugby League World Cup.

He is a current Scotland International and he scored a try and kicked a goal on his début against Papua New Guinea, in a 2013 Rugby League World Cup warm-up match on 19 October 2013, which ended in a 20-38 loss to the Kumuls.

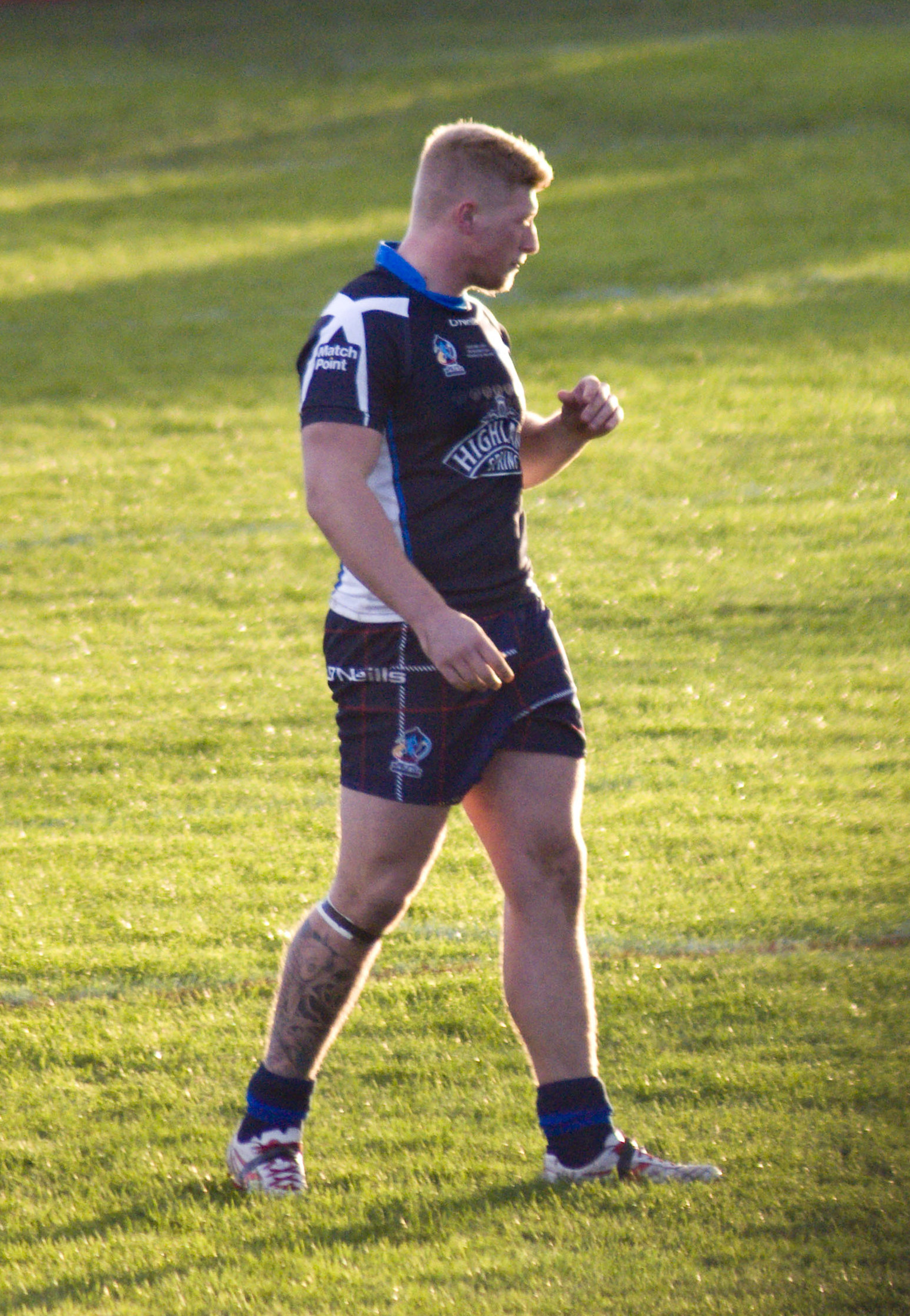
Addy in action for Scotland

Addy featured in the group games against Tonga, Italy (in which he scored a try) and the USA. Addy also played in the Quarter-Final against New Zealand.

==== 2014 ====
Addy was also selected in the Scotland squad for the 2014 European Cup. He played at hooker, in the tournaments opening game against Wales. He then featured against Ireland (in which he scored a try) and France.

==== 2015 ====
Addy was selected in the Scotland squad for the 2015 European Cup.

He started at scrum-half, alongside Danny Brough for the opening match against Wales and then at loose forward against France, (in which he scored a brace of tries).

==== 2017 ====
Addy was selected in the Scotland side for the 2017 Rugby League World Cup.

He featured against Tonga, New Zealand and Samoa. His scoring record against those particular teams during the tournament was: Tonga (1 try), New Zealand (1 goal) and Samoa (3 goals).

== Coaching career ==
=== 2018 ===
It was revealed on 18 April 2018, that Addy had taken over the leadership of Scotland's under-19's programme for the rest of 2018. The offer made to Addy, was to keep him busy during his long recovery from his season ending ACL knee injury. That he sustained in the pre-season of the 2018 rugby league campaign. Following the announcement of the news, Addy had this to say, "I am incredibly proud to represent and support Scotland. I have been on at the Chairman, Keith Hogg, for some time to find a way for me to get involved in coaching. Obviously, I didn't want to get seriously injured but it has given me the chance to take-up this great opportunity. Furthermore he added, "I am very grateful to my club, (Hull Kingston Rovers) for releasing me to do this. To get the chance to develop my rugby league coaching experience within the Scotland set-up and help some of Scotland's younger players to develop is very exciting."

Scotland's Chairman, Keith Hogg, added, "Danny is one of a large group of players whose commitment to the Bravehearts is outstanding and who want to put something back into the development of the sport in Scotland. "We did not want to see him get injured, but with great support from Hull Kingston Rovers we are really pleased to have him leading our under-19's programme for the rest of 2018."
