= Rick Chisholm =

Australian rugby league footballer (1959-2007)

Personal information
- Full name: Rick Chisholm
- Born: 1 March 1959 Sydney, New South Wales, Australia
- Died: 27 February 2007 (aged 47) Gold Coast, Queensland, Australia

Playing information
- Position: Halfback
Club
| Years | Team | Pld | T | G | FG | P |
|---|---|---|---|---|---|---|
| 1980–82 | Manly-Warringah | 26 | 9 | 7 | 7 | 48 |
| 1983 | Newtown | 3 | 0 | 1 | 0 | 2 |
| 1983–84 | Manly-Warringah | 4 | 0 | 1 | 0 | 2 |
| | Total | 33 | 9 | 9 | 7 | 52 |
- Source: As of 11 April 2019
- Relatives: Dane Chisholm (son); Wayne Chisholm (brother)

Rick Chisholm (1959–2007) was an Australian professional rugby league footballer who played in the 1980s. He played for Manly-Warringah and Newtown in the New South Wales Rugby League (NSWRL) competition. Chisholm is the father of the rugby league footballer Dane Chisholm, and the brother of Wayne Chisholm.

== Background ==
Chisholm grew up playing rugby league in the Manly district before being graded by Manly-Warringah in 1980.

== Playing career ==
Chisholm made his first grade debut for Manly-Warringah against Newtown in Round 10 1980 kicking 2 goals and field goal in a 14–13 victory. The following week, Chisholm scored an individual 17 points, scoring 2 tries and kicking 5 goals plus a field goal in a 17–14 win over Cronulla-Sutherland.

After missing the entire 1981 season, Chisholm returned in 1982 and played 21 games for Manly. Chisholm missed out on selection in Manly's 1982 grand final team which lost to the Parramatta Eels. In 1983, Chisholm was released by Manly and he joined Newtown. Chisholm played 3 games for Newtown in what would prove to be their last season in the NSWRL competition. Chisholm then made a mid season switch back to Manly and was selected to play from the bench in the 1983 NSWRL grand final against Parramatta. Parramatta would go on to win their third straight premiership defeating Manly 18–6.

Chisholm played on with Manly in 1984 before retiring at the age of 25. He died on 27 February 2007 after a long illness.
