= Johnny Campbell (rugby league) =

English rugby league footballer

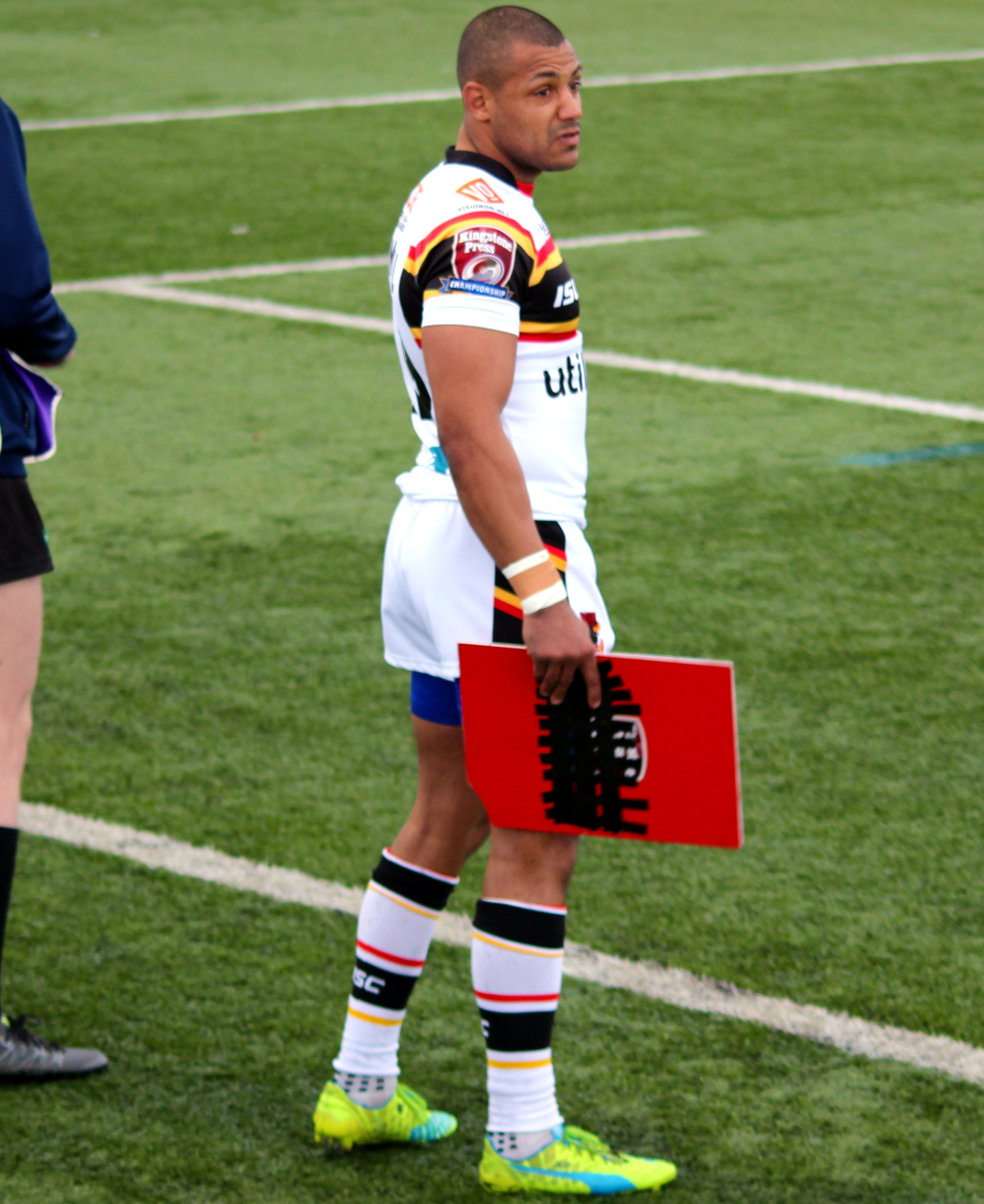

Personal information
- Full name: Jonathan Campbell
- Born: 17 July 1987 (age 38)
- Height: 5 ft 10 in (1.79 m)
- Weight: 14 st 11 lb (94 kg)

Playing information
- Position: Wing, Fullback
Club
Years	Team	Pld	T	G	FG	P
2009–15	Batley Bulldogs	130	64	0	0	256
2016–17	Bradford Bulls	19	7	0	0	28
2016(loan)	→ Keighley Cougars	3	3	0	0	12
2018–23	Batley Bulldogs	95	55	0	0	220
2023(loan)	→ Hunslet	7	12	0	0	48
	Total	254	141	0	0	564
- Source: As of 2 February 2024

Jonathan Campbell (born 17 July 1987) is a former English professional rugby league player who played on the wing or as a fullback.

He has previously played for Batley and the Bradford Bulls in the Championship. Campbell has also spent time on loan from Bradford at the Keighley Cougars in League 1.

== Rugby league career ==
Campbell played for Batley for six years.

=== Bradford ===
Campbell signed a two-year deal with the Bradford Bulls following the 2015 season. Campbell played in three matches during the 2016 season, scoring a try against Oldham. Following Bradford's liquidation at the end of the 2016 season, Campbell resigned with the reformed club. In 2017, he featured in the pre-season friendlies against Huddersfield and Keighley. Campbell played in Round 5 against the London Broncos to Round 15 Hull Kingston Rovers then in Round 18 against the Rochdale Hornets. He featured in Round 22 Batley to Round 23 Swinton. Campbell played in the Championship Shield Game 3 against Swinton. Campbell also played in the 2017 Challenge Cup in Round 4 against Featherstone Rovers.

=== Batley ===
In September 2017, Campbell signed to play with Batley in the 2018 season. On 30 July 2022, Campbell scored four tries for Batley in a 60-6 victory over Dewsbury.
