= Dane Chisholm =

France international rugby league footballer

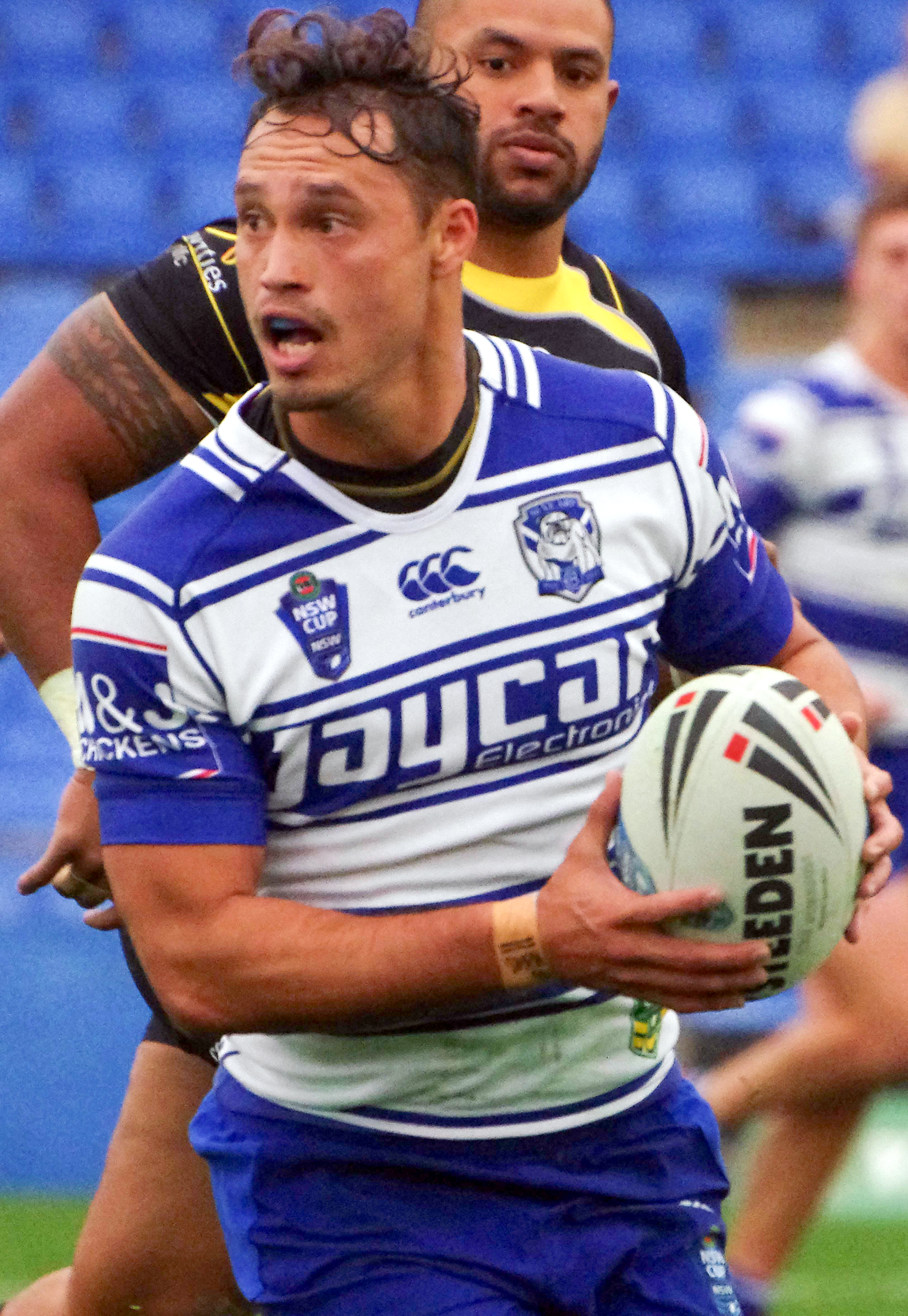

Personal information
- Born: 4 July 1990 (age 36) Mullumbimby, New South Wales, Australia

Playing information
- Height: 180 cm (5 ft 11 in)
- Weight: 90 kg (14 st 2 lb)

Rugby league
- Position: Stand-off, Scrum-half, Fullback
Club
Years	Team	Pld	T	G	FG	P
2011	Melbourne Storm	1	0	0	0	0
2015(loan)	→ Hull Kingston Rovers	7	3	0	0	12
2016	Bradford Bulls	11	9	6	1	49
2017	Sheffield Eagles	7	2	3	0	14
2017–19	Bradford Bulls	32	19	129	4	338
2019(loan)	→ Featherstone Rovers	4	4	21	0	58
2019–22	Featherstone Rovers	38	25	142	4	388
2022(loan)	→ London Broncos	3	1	7	0	18
2022–23	Keighley Cougars	24	7	35	3	101
2023	Featherstone Rovers	6	3	2	0	16
	Total	133	73	345	12	994
Representative
Years	Team	Pld	T	G	FG	P
2011	France	4	3	0	0	12

Rugby union
Club
Years	Team	Pld	T	G	FG	P
2014–15	Manly Marlins	14	9	3	1	52
- Father: Rick Chisholm
- Relatives: Wayne Chisholm (uncle)

Dane Chisholm (born 4 July 1990) is a retired French-Australian international rugby league footballer who last played as a scrum-half for Featherstone Rovers in the Championship.

He previously played for the Sheffield Eagles and the Melbourne Storm and the Bradford Bulls and Hull Kingston Rovers and the Keighley Cougars.

== Background ==
Chisholm was born in Manly, New South Wales, Australia.

== Playing career ==
=== Melbourne Storm ===
After playing for junior club Mullumbimby Giants, Chisholm was a part of the under 18s NRRRL premiership win in 2008 for the Giants.

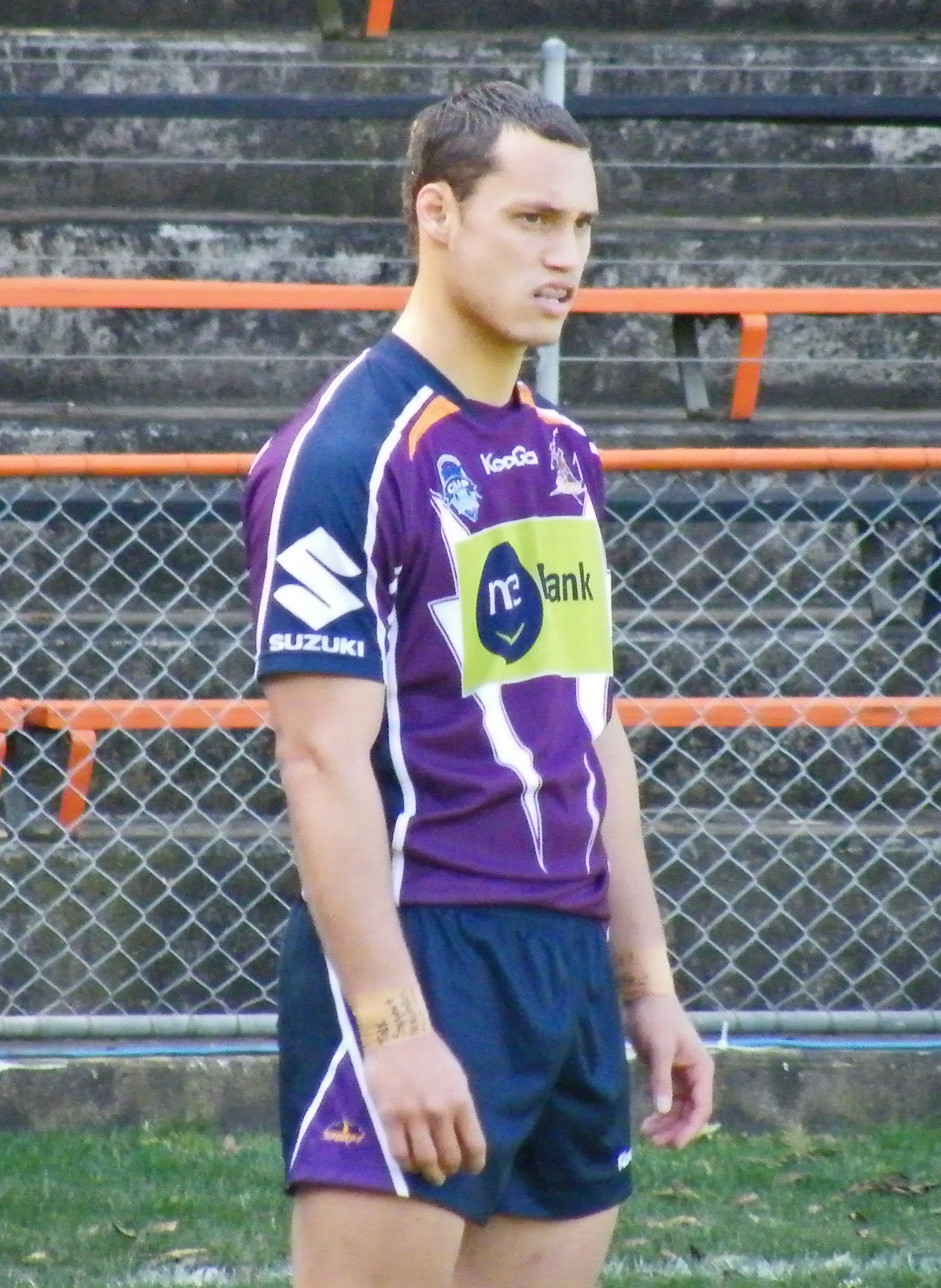
Chisholm playing for Melbourne in 2010

Chisholm signed with Melbourne Storm and was called into their under-20s side. He played in the Storm's Toyota Cup win over Wests Tigers in the 2009 Grand Final.

Chisholm made his NRL debut for Melbourne in round 10 of the 2011 NRL season against Canberra.

=== Wests Tigers ===
In November 2011, Chisholm signed to play for Wests Tigers in the 2012 NRL season. He failed to make an appearance in first grade, playing for feeder team Balmain Ryde Eastwood Tigers and was a member of the side that lost the NSW Cup grand final.

=== Manly-Warringah Sea Eagles ===
Chisholm signed for the Manly-Warringah Sea Eagles in the 2013 NRL season.

=== Manly Marlins ===
In 2014 he made the switch to Rugby Union signing with Manly Marlins in the Shute Shield.

=== Canterbury-Bankstown Bulldogs ===
Chisholm was on a loan deal from the Canterbury-Bankstown Bulldogs until the end of the 2015 season.

=== Hull Kingston Rovers ===
He made his debut for Hull Kingston Rovers, in the final game of the First Utility Super League season, against reigning Super League Champions, St Helens. He then went on to play six out of seven games, in the Super 8s Qualifiers. In total, he made seven appearances, scoring on three occasions for Rovers.

=== Bradford Bulls ===
Chisholm signed a one-and-a-half-year deal to play for RFL Championship side Bradford.

2016 – 2016 Season

Chisholm featured in Round 21 against Whitehaven to Round 23 against Featherstone Rovers. Chisholm played in the Championship Shield Game 1 against Whitehaven to Game 5 Swinton then in Game 7 Sheffield to the final against Sheffield.

2017 – 2017 Season

After spending the start of 2017 with Sheffield, Chisholm returned to Bradford. He featured in Round 15 against Hull Kingston Rovers. However he suffered a season ending injury. Chisholm signed a two-year extension with Bradford at the end of the season.

2018 – 2018 Season

Chisholm played in Round 2 against the London Skolars to Round 22 against Workington Town then in Round 24 West Wales Raiders to Final Workington Town. He also featured in the 2018 Challenge Cup in Round 3 against the West Wales Raiders to Round 4 Hunslet R.L.F.C. At the end of the season he signed a one-year extension with the Bradford side.

2019 – 2019 Season

Chisholm featured in the pre-season friendlies against York, Huddersfield and the Toronto Wolfpack. Chisholm played in Round 1 match against Featherstone to Round 2 against Swinton then in Round 4 against York. Chisholm was sent on loan to Featherstone Rovers for the remainder of the season, after a fall out with club coach John Kear. He then signed with Featherstone on a permanent basis until the end of the 2019 season.

=== Featherstone Rovers ===
In 2019 Chisholm signed for Featherstone Rovers

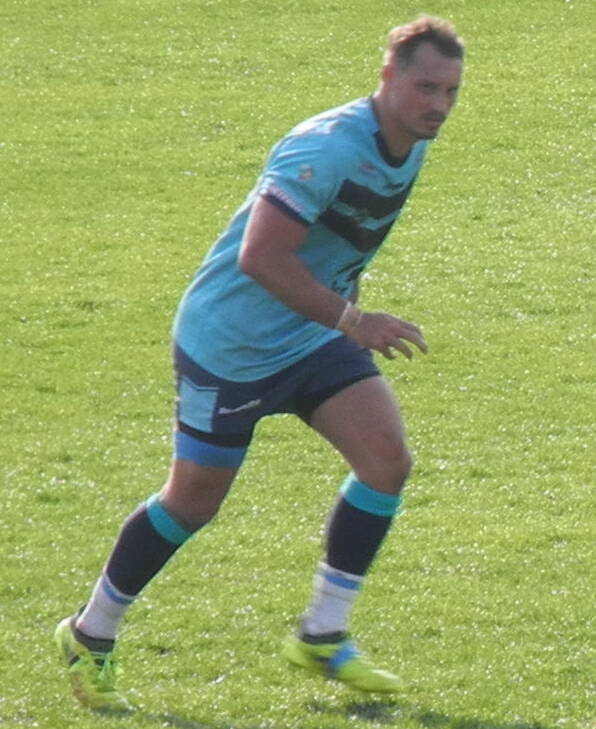
Chisholm playing for Featherstone in 2019

He played for Featherstone in the club's 2021 Million Pound Game loss against Toulouse Olympique.

In June 2023 Chisholm rejoined Featherstone Rovers, after playing two seasons at Keighley Cougars. In January 2024 he announced his retirement from professional rugby league

== Statistics ==
Statistics do not include pre-season friendlies.

Season	Appearance	Tries	Goals	D/G	Points
2016 Bradford	11	9	6	1	49
2017 Bradford	1	1	0	1	5
2018 Bradford	28	19	128	4	334
2019 Bradford	3	1	8	1	21
2019 Featherstone	4	4	21	0	58

== International ==
In 2010, Chisholm was named in the French preliminary squad for the 2010 European Cup. Chisholm qualifies for the French side because of his mother and grandparents. He played 4 games for France in 2011, debuting at fullback in France's loss to the England Knights. He also scored 3 tries in France's 42–10 victory over Scotland.

== Family ==
Rick, Dane's father, played in 30 first-grade matches for Manly and Newtown in the early 1980s. His uncle Wayne Chisholm played over 100 games with South Sydney. Dane has since gone on to start a family of his own, he has a little girl named Nyah Kiki a boy named Kai Ricky after his late father & wife Chelsey.
