= Richard Mathers =

Former England international rugby league footballer

Richie Mathers
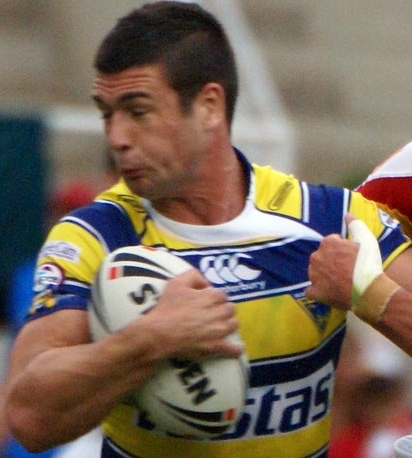

Personal information
- Full name: Richard Anthony Mathers
- Born: 24 October 1983 (age 42) Leeds, West Yorkshire, England

Playing information
- Height: 6 ft 0 in (1.83 m)
- Weight: 15 st 2 lb (96 kg)
- Position: Fullback, Wing
Club
Years	Team	Pld	T	G	FG	P
2002–06	Leeds Rhinos	95	30	0	0	120
2002(loan)	→ Hunslet Hawks	2	0	0	0	0
2002(loan)	→ Warrington Wolves	7	0	0	0	0
2007	Gold Coast Titans	6	0	0	0	0
2008–09	Wigan Warriors	25	2	0	0	8
2009–10	Warrington Wolves	47	14	0	0	56
2011	Castleford Tigers	23	7	0	0	28
2012–14	Wakefield Trinity Wildcats	73	24	0	0	96
2015	London Broncos	4	0	0	0	0
2016	Bradford Bulls	8	0	0	0	0
	Total	290	77	0	0	308
Representative
Years	Team	Pld	T	G	FG	P
2005	England	2	0	1	0	2

Richard 'Richie' Mathers (born 24 October 1983) is an English former professional rugby league footballer. An England international representative fullback, he started his professional career at the Leeds Rhinos, with whom he won the 2004 Championship. He played as a fullback for a number of clubs throughout his career.

== Background ==
Mathers was born in Leeds, West Yorkshire, England.

== Playing career ==
Mathers first started off his rugby league career at amateur rugby league club Milford Marlins and East Leeds. Mathers is one of numerous players who rose through the ranks at Leeds. A star of the academy, with whom he played in two consecutive Grand Final wins with, he broke into the first team at the end of 2002 after a loan spell with Warrington.

=== Leeds Rhinos ===
After making seven appearances with the Warrington club, Mathers rejoined the Leeds Rhinos, scoring a try in just his second appearance. The following season Mathers became a first team regular and his form in 2004 was such that the Leeds club allowed the former Wigan Warriors "star Gary Connolly to depart. He ended that year with many predicting that the fullback would be a star for the Leeds side for many years to come and not only was he named the Evening Post Shooting Star winner, after only missing four matches all season, he was also part of the Leeds Grand Final-winning squad. Mathers played fullback in Leeds 16–8 victory over the Bradford side in the 2004 Super League Grand Final during 2004's Super League IX at Old Trafford, Manchester on Saturday 16 October 2004, in front of a crowd of 65,547.

By 2005 Mathers was promoted to the number one shirt and was one of the first names on the team sheet, only missing one match all season. One of the highlights of the years was when he helped the team to victory in the 2005 World Club Challenge when he scored a try against the Canterbury-Bankstown Bulldogs at his beloved Elland Road, Leeds. Mathers played for the Leeds side as a fullback in their 2005 Challenge Cup Final defeat against Hull FC. Mathers played for the Leeds club as a fullback in their 2005 Super League Grand Final defeat against Bradford. In the middle of 2006's Super League XI, Mathers injured his knee against Hull F.C. at Headingley, which not only ended his season but also his Leeds career. In 2007, he made his début for the new National Rugby League (NRL) team the Gold Coast.

=== Gold Coast Titans ===
Mathers did not play for the Gold Coast club for much of the start of the season, but an injury to regular fullback Preston Campbell allowed Mathers to make his début for the Gold Coast. Mathers played five rounds and appeared to be gaining confidence and good form until he ruptured the anterior cruciate ligament in his right knee. This injury was similar to the injury that occurred while he was playing for Leeds and kept him out for the rest of the season. Mathers team-mates offered to pay for Mathers to travel home before he begins the long road to recovery. On 6 November 2007, the Titans released Mathers from his contract and a few hours later Wigan announced that they had signed Richie on a three-year contract. He only played five matches for the Gold Coast side due to rupturing his anterior cruciate ligament in his right knee which required a full knee reconstruction.

=== Wigan Warriors ===
Wigan had a fullback vacancy following the departure of Chris Ashton to rugby union, and the retirement of Michael Withers, although Pat Richards did a sterling job for Wigan during the last two months of the 2007 season. Mathers made his début in the 42–18 win over Widnes in a friendly scoring two tries. Mathers scored a try in a 47–28 win at Harlequins on his Super League début for Wigan but was sent off for the first time in his career in Round 5 against Warrington for a high tackle on Matt King, for which he received a three-match ban. He filled in as a stand-off on his return to the side against Wakefield Trinity in Round 9 before reverting to his usual position of fullback. However, Mathers was red-carded again in Round 25 for leading with an elbow as he attempted to fend off Wakefield's Jason Demetriou, although Wigan still won 32–22 to secure a play-off place. Mathers was the only player to be sent off twice during 2008's Super League XIII. Mathers was sin-binned during Wigan's opening game of 2009's Super League XIV for a trip on Wakefield wing Dave Halley. He was cited by the Rugby Football League, and received a two-match suspension, ruling him out of games against Hull and Castleford.

Warrington signed Mathers on 6 April 2009, with Martin Gleeson going the other way to Wigan, plus a six figure transfer fee to Warrington.

=== Warrington Wolves ===
Mathers had to wait more than a month for his Warrington début, when he scored twice against Featherstone Rovers in a Challenge Cup tie on 10 May 2009 and scored the first try in the Challenge Cup Final for Warrington.

Mathers played in the 2010 Challenge Cup Final victory over Leeds at Wembley Stadium.

=== Castleford Tigers ===
Mathers joined Castleford Tigers for the 2011 season after he signed a three-year deal with the Yorkshire club. He made 22 Super League appearances for the team before being loaned out to Wakefield Trinity for the 2012 season.

=== Wakefield Trinity Wildcats ===
Mathers joined Wakefield Trinity for the 2012 season.

=== London Broncos ===
On 7 August, Kingstone Press Championship side London Broncos announced the signing of Mathers on a two-year deal starting from 2015.

Mathers made his London Broncos début in a 26–22 victory over Doncaster at The Hive.

=== Bradford Bulls ===
Mathers announced he was coming out of retirement and signed a 1-Year Deal with the Bradford Bulls.

2016 - 2016 Season

Mathers did not feature in any pre-season games. He featured in Round 1 (Featherstone Rovers) to Round 2 (Whitehaven) then in Round 4 (Leigh). He played in Round 6 (Batley) to Round 8 (Halifax). Mathers featured in Round 15 (Leigh) to Round 16 (Dewsbury).

Statistics do not include pre-season friendlies.

Season	Appearance	Tries	Goals	F/G	Points
2016 Bradford Bulls	8	0	0	0	0
Total	8	0	0	0	0
