= Trevor Clark (rugby league) =

New Zealand rugby league footballer

Personal information
- Born: 28 May 1962 (age 64) Hamilton, New Zealand

Playing information
- Position: Hooker
Club
Years	Team	Pld	T	G	FG	P
1983–87	Leeds	58	10	0	0	40
1986	→ York (loan)	9	6	0	0	24
1988–92	Featherstone Rovers	125	30	0	0	120
1992–95	Bradford Northern	83	16	0	0	64
	Total	275	62	0	0	248
Representative
Years	Team	Pld	T	G	FG	P
	Waikato
	New Zealand Māori
- Relatives: Mitch Clark (son)

Trevor Clark (born 28 May 1962) is a New Zealand academic and former rugby league footballer and coach who played as a hooker.

== Rugby league career ==
At club level, Clark played for Huntly South in his home country, and was a Waikato representative.

Clark was selected for the 1983 Māori tour of Great Britain. He remained in England following the conclusion of the tour, and signed a professional contract with Leeds.

Clark joined Featherstone Rovers in 1988, and played for the club in the 1989–90 Yorkshire Cup final defeat against Bradford Northern.

Clark joined Bradford Northern in 1992, and played for the club in the 1992–93 Regal Trophy final defeat against Wigan. He was released at the end of the 1994–95 season.

After retiring as a player, Clark moved into coaching, and worked as a strength and conditioning coach for the Auckland Warriors in the National Rugby League. He later held a similar coaching role in Australia with the Windsor Wolves in the NSW Cup, and the rugby union team North Harbour in the National Provincial Championship.

== Academic career ==
Clark studied Sports Science at Leeds Beckett University during his playing career, from which he graduated with a Master of Science degree. He spent several years conducting research on the health of retired Māori rugby league players, and received a PhD from Massey University for his work in 2018.

He was a lecturer at the Australian College of Physical Education in Sydney, and was later appointed as Dean of the International College of Management, Sydney.

== Personal life ==
Clark is of Waikato Tainui descent. He is the father of Mitch Clark, who is also a rugby league footballer.
