= Kieren Moss =

Australian rugby league footballer

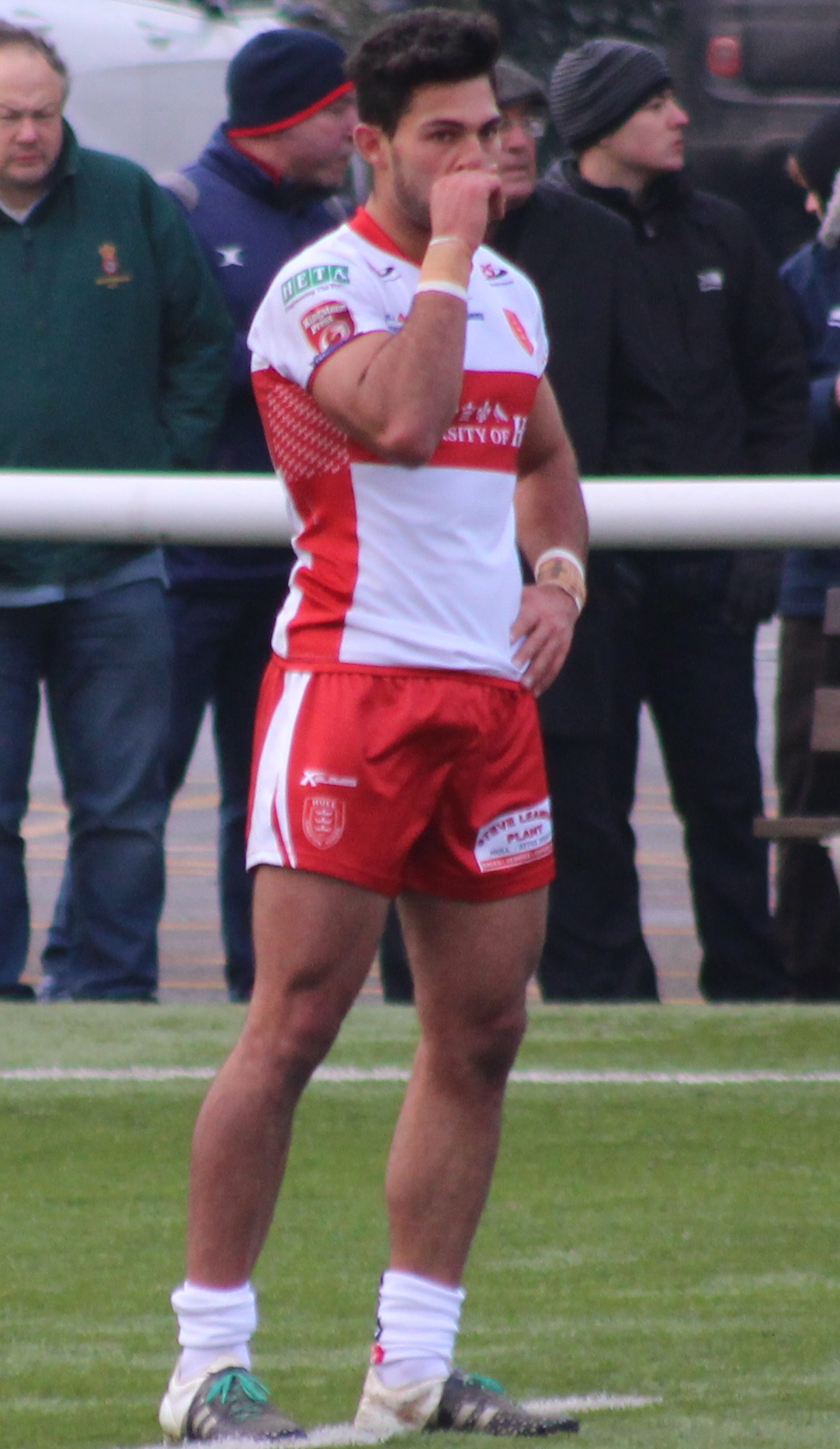

Personal information
- Full name: Kieren Moss
- Born: 6 August 1993 (age 32) Sydney, Australia
- Height: 179 cm (5 ft 10 in)
- Weight: 87 kg (13 st 10 lb)

Playing information
- Position: Fullback, Five-eighth
Club
Years	Team	Pld	T	G	FG	P
2016	Bradford Bulls	16	13	0	0	52
2017–18	Hull Kingston Rovers	24	17	0	0	68
2018(DR)	→ York City Knights	10	14	0	0	56
2018(loan)	→ Halifax	12	7	0	0	28
	Total	62	51	0	0	204
- Source: As of 1 June 2019

Kieren Moss (born 6 August 1993) is a professional rugby league footballer who plays as a fullback for the Mount Pritchard Mounties in the Intrust Super Premiership. He has previously played for Hull Kingston Rovers and the Bradford Bulls in the English Super League.

== Background ==
Moss was born in Sydney, Australia.

=== Penrith Panthers (2014) ===
Moss played for the Penrith Panthers as part of their 2014 New South Wales Cup winning team.

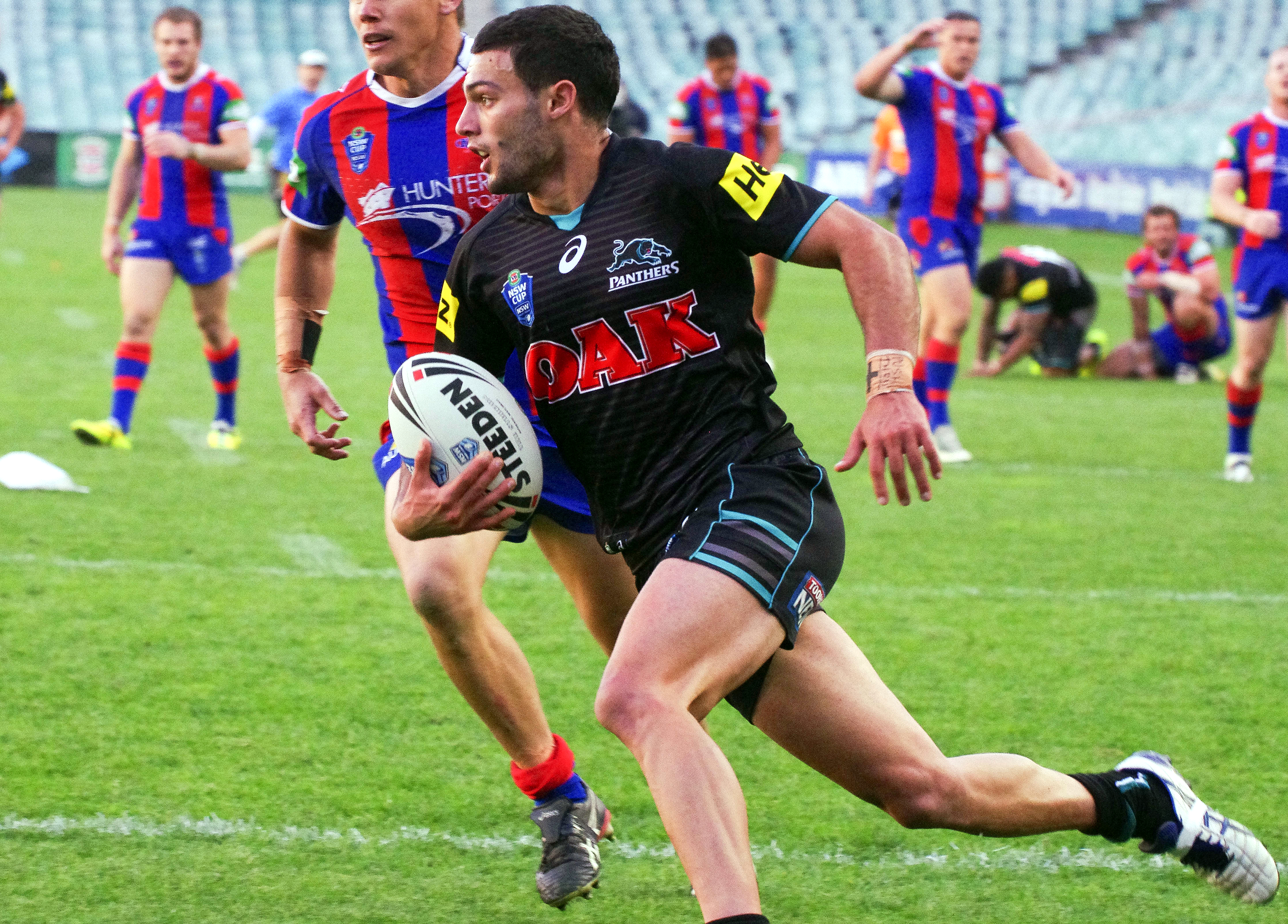
Moss playing for the Penrith Panthers at ANZ Stadium

=== Parramatta Eels (2015) ===
In August 2015, he signed for the Parramatta Eels, before joining the Bradford Bulls in June 2016.

=== Bradford Bulls (2016) ===
Moss played for Bradford during the 2016 Championship season.

=== Hull Kingston Rovers (2017–18) ===
He signed for Hull Kingston Rovers as a free agent on a one-year contract, after Bradford went into liquidation in January 2017. Moss was part of the Hull Kingston Rovers side that won promotion back to the Super League, at the first time of asking following relegation the season prior. Moss scored a hat-trick of tries in Hull Kingston Rovers 22–34 loss to Hull F.C. at the 2018 Magic Weekend. It was revealed on 10 October 2018, that Moss would be departing Hull Kingston Rovers following a restructure of the club's on field personnel.

=== York City Knights (2018) ===
Moss played for the York City Knights in the 2018 season, as part of Hull Kingston Rovers dual registration agreement with the club. On 29 April 2018, Moss scored seven tries for the York City Knights against the West Wales Raiders, in a 144–0 record-breaking victory in the League 1 competition.

=== Halifax R.L.F.C. (2018) ===
It was announced on 7 June 2018, that Moss was going to spend the remainder of the 2018 rugby league season on loan at Halifax. On 10 June 2018, Moss made his début for the 'Fax in a try-scoring appearance against the Leigh Centurions, in a 36–30 Championship league defeat. Moss featured in the fullback position.

=== North Sydney Bears (2019) ===
On 12 December 2018, Moss signed a one-year deal to join Intrust Super Premiership NSW side the North Sydney Bears ahead of the 2019 season. On 6 May 2019, Moss was selected for the Canterbury Cup NSW residents side to play against the Queensland residents representative team. Moss made a total of 23 appearances for Norths in the 2019 Canterbury Cup NSW season as the club finished 3rd on the table and qualified for the finals. Norths were then eliminated from the finals series after losing both matches against South Sydney and Newtown.

=== Mount Pritchard Mounties (2020) ===
On 15 January it was announced that Moss had joined Canberra Raiders affiliate Mount Pritchard Mounties for the 2020 season.
