= Lewis Charnock =

English rugby league footballer

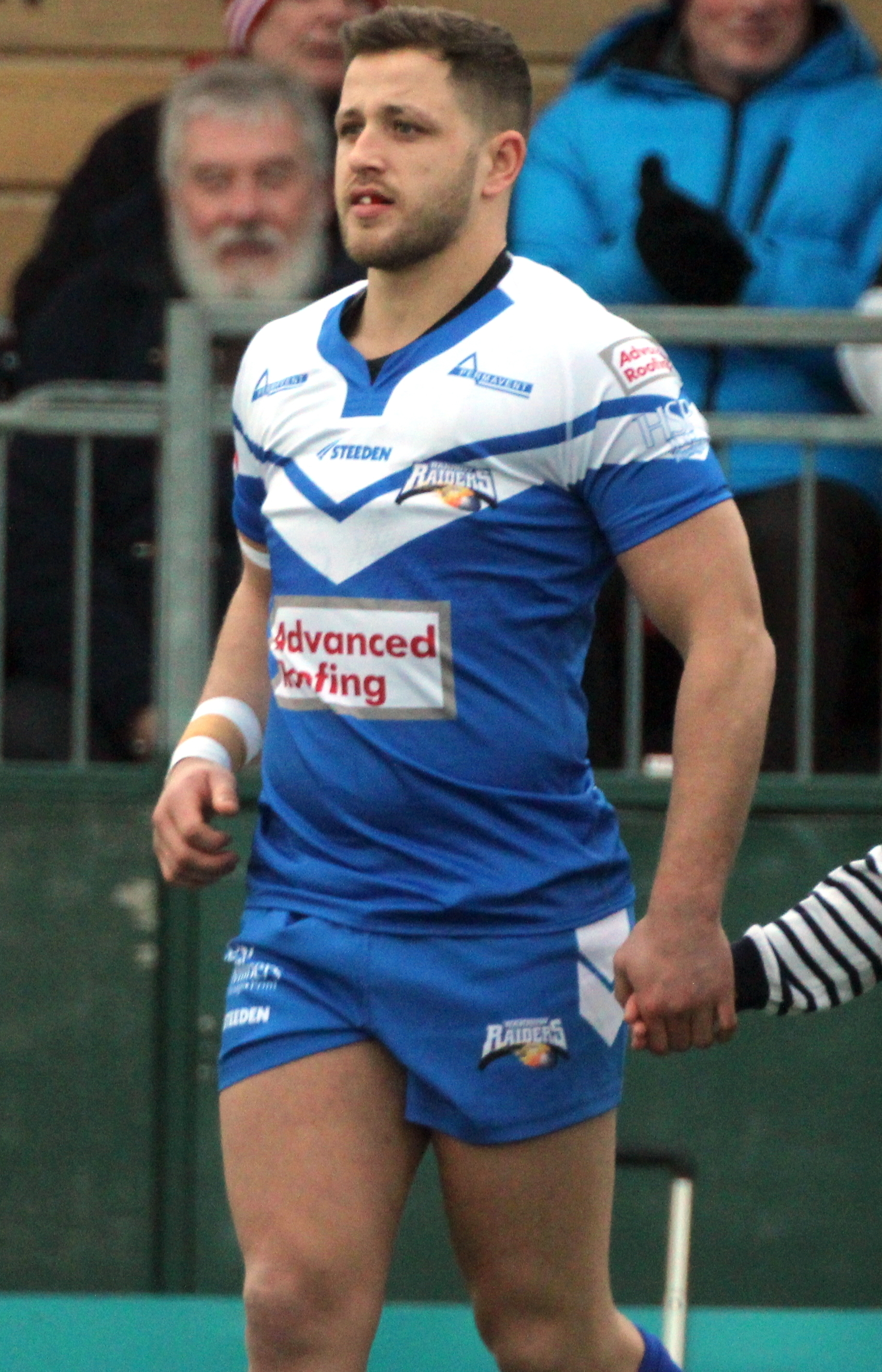

Personal information
- Full name: Lewis Charnock
- Born: 2 September 1994 (age 31) Warrington, Cheshire, England
- Height: 5 ft 11 in (1.80 m)
- Weight: 13 st 1 lb (83 kg)

Playing information
- Position: Scrum-half, Stand-off, Hooker
Club
Years	Team	Pld	T	G	FG	P
2013–16	St. Helens	6	2	8	0	24
2015(loan)	→ Rochdale Hornets	8	0	5	0	10
2016(loan)	→ Leigh Centurions	2	1	0	0	4
2016(loan)	→ Bradford Bulls	12	3	26	0	64
2017–19	Barrow Raiders	31	15	115	0	290
2020	Oldham	16	2	0	0	8
2022	Swinton Lions	19	5	0	0	20
	Total	94	28	154	0	420
- Source: As of 8 January 2023

Lewis Charnock (born 2 September 1994) is an English former rugby league footballer who last played as a stand-off, scrum-half or hooker for the Swinton Lions in the RFL League 1. He has previously played for Oldham Roughyeds in the Championship and for St. Helens in the Super League. Upon retirement from playing, he joined the coaching staff of Woolston Rovers Community Club in December 2022.

== Club career ==
=== St Helens ===
Charnock made his St Helens début against the Salford City Reds on 22 March 2013 and kicked three goals. After failing to appear in the first team in 2014, Charnock made a further three appearances in 2015, scoring his first two tries for the club in a win over Wakefield Trinity.

=== Bradford Bulls ===
In 2016 Charnock signed a loan deal with the Bradford Bulls of the Championship.

He featured in round 5 against Oldham and in round 17 against Workington Town. He then featured in the round 19 match against Halifax then in round 21 against Whitehaven. Charnock played in round 23 against Featherstone Rovers. Charnock played in the Championship Shield Game 1 against Whitehaven to Game 2 Halifax then in Game 7 Sheffield to the final against the same opponent.

=== Barrow Raiders ===
Charnock joined Barrow for the 2017 season.

=== Oldham ===
On 29 October 2019 it was announced that Charnock had signed for Oldham on a two-year deal.

=== Swinton Lions ===
On 12 November 2021, it was reported that he had signed for Swinton in the RFL League 1.
