= Mitch Clark (rugby league) =

NZ Maori international rugby league footballer (born 1993)

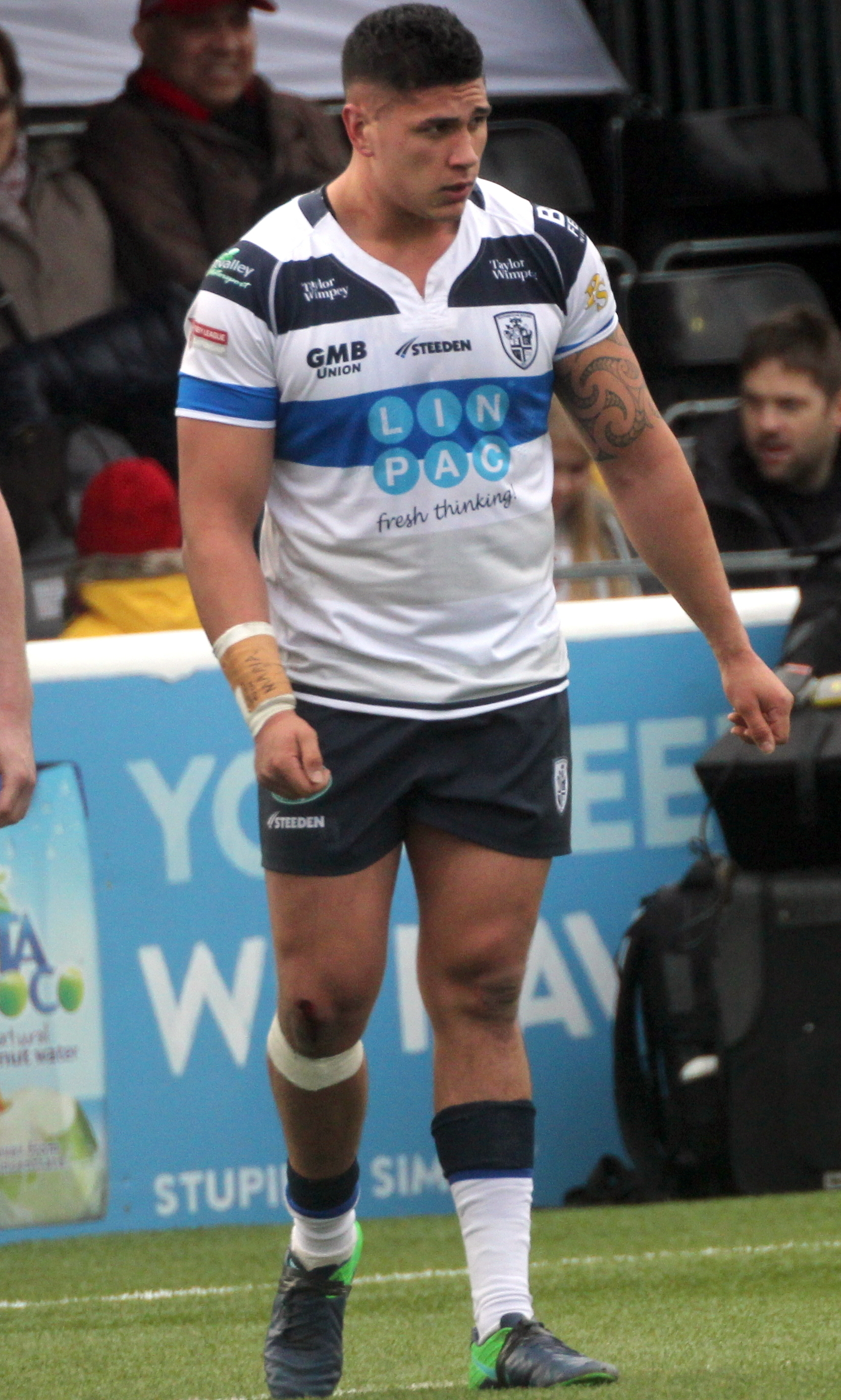

Personal information
- Born: 30 March 1993 (age 33) Pontefract, West Yorkshire, England
- Height: 6 ft 2 in (1.89 m)
- Weight: 17 st 9 lb (112 kg)

Playing information
- Position: Second-row, Prop
Club
Years	Team	Pld	T	G	FG	P
2015	Doncaster	23	3	0	0	12
2016	Bradford Bulls	24	5	0	0	20
2017	Hull Kingston Rovers	15	0	0	0	0
2017(DR)	→ York City Knights	1	0	0	0	0
2018–19	Castleford Tigers	24	3	0	0	12
2018(loan)	→ Featherstone Rovers	11	2	0	0	8
2019(DR)	→ Halifax	1	0	0	0	0
2019	Leigh Centurions	7	1	0	0	4
2020–21	Wigan Warriors	17	2	0	0	8
2021(loan)	→ Newcastle Thunder	2	0	0	0	0
2022–23	Newcastle Thunder	52	4	0	0	16
2024–25	Sheffield Eagles	27	1	0	0	4
2025–	York Knights	8	0	0	0	0
2026	→ Newcastle Thunder (loan)	0	0	0	0	0
	Total	212	21	0	0	84
Representative
Years	Team	Pld	T	G	FG	P
2017	New Zealand Māori	1	0	0	0	0
- Source: As of 24 July 2026
- Father: Trevor Clark

Mitch Clark (born 30 March 1993) is a New Zealand Māori international rugby league footballer who plays as a prop for Newcastle Thunder in the RFL Championship, on loan from the York Knights in the Super League.

He has previously played for the Penrith Panthers in the Holden Cup, Doncaster in Kingstone Press championship, and the Bradford Bulls and Hull Kingston Rovers in the Championship. He played one game at the York City Knights in 2017 on dual registration from Hull Kingston Rovers, before moving to Castleford in the top flight. He spent time on loan from the Tigers in 2018. He played one game for Halifax RLFC on dual registration in 2019. Clark also played for the Leigh Centurions in the Championship.

== Background ==
Clark was born in Pontefract, West Yorkshire, England.

He is of New Zealand heritage, however he was born in England while his father, Trevor Clark was playing for Bradford Northern after stints with Leeds Rhinos and Featherstone Rovers. He followed in his father's footsteps in 2016 when he débuted for the Bradford Bulls against Whitehaven.

== Early career ==
Clark played in the Toyota Cup under-20s competition in 2012 with the Penrith Panthers before the competition was renamed the Holden Cup in 2013. He played in the 2013 Holden Cup Grand final for the Penrith Panthers over the New Zealand Warriors and scored a try in the 30-42 victory.

He represented the Junior Kiwis in 2013 against the Junior Kangaroos beaten 38-26 at WIN Jubilee Oval Kograh on 13 October.

== Playing career ==
=== Doncaster ===
Clark spent 2015 with Doncaster.

=== Bradford Bulls ===
Clark joined the Bradford Bulls in 2016 but did not feature in the pre-season friendlies against Castleford Tigers and Leeds Rhinos.

He played in Round 2 (Whitehaven) to Round 12 (London Broncos). Mitch played in Round 14 (Sheffield Eagles) to Round 18 (Batley Bulldogs). He featured in the Championship Shield in Game 3 (Oldham) to the Final (Sheffield Eagles). Clark played in the Challenge Cup in the 4th Round (Dewsbury Rams). He scored against Workington Town (2 tries), Leigh Centurions (1 try), Oldham (1 try) and Dewsbury Rams (1 try).

=== Hull Kingston Rovers ===
Mitch Clark signed a 1-year deal with the Hull Kingston Rovers for the 2017 season.

Clark featured in Round 1 (Bradford Bulls) to Round 4 (Oldham).

=== Castleford Tigers ===
In October 2017 he signed for the Castleford Tigers on a two-year deal.

=== Wigan Warriors ===
Clark moved to the Wigan Warriors ahead of the 2020 Super League season.

=== Newcastle Thunder (loan) ===
On 10 Jun 2021 it was reported that he had signed for the Newcastle Thunder in the RFL Championship on loan.

=== Newcastle Thunder ===
On 7 Nov 2021 it was reported that he had signed for Newcastle Thunder in the RFL Championship.

=== Baroudeurs de Pia XIII ===
On 24 Oct 2022 it was reported that he had signed for Baroudeurs de Pia XIII in the Elite One Championship.

=== Sheffield Eagles ===
On 31 Oct 2023 it was reported that he will join Sheffield Eagles for the 2024 season on a 2-year deal.

=== York Knights ===
On 26 February 2025 it was reported that he had left Sheffield Eagles to join Championship rivals York Knights
