= Dale Ferguson (rugby league) =

Scotland international rugby league footballer

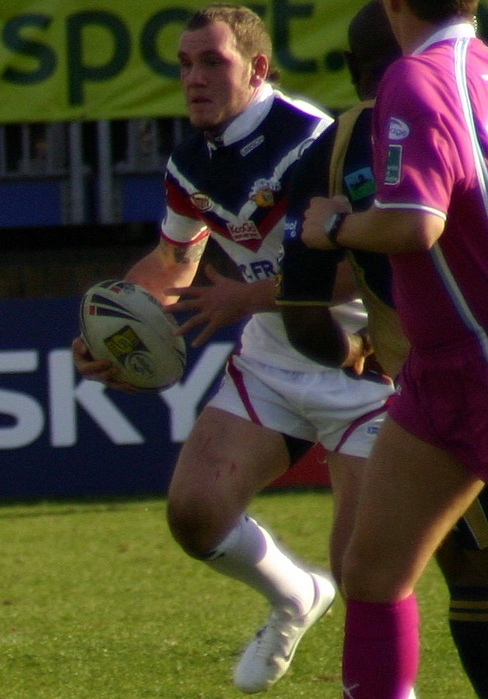

Personal information
- Born: 13 April 1988 (age 38) Pontefract, Yorkshire, England
- Height: 6 ft 0 in (1.83 m)
- Weight: 16 st 10 lb (106 kg)

Playing information
- Position: Loose forward, Second-row
Club
Years	Team	Pld	T	G	FG	P
2007–11	Wakefield Trinity Wildcats	57	12	0	0	48
2011–13	Huddersfield Giants	59	15	0	0	60
2013(loan)	→ Hull Kingston Rovers	4	1	0	0	4
2014–16	Bradford Bulls	52	13	0	0	52
2017–19	Huddersfield Giants	32	3	0	0	12
2019(loan)	→ Featherstone Rovers	4	1	0	0	4
2020–21	Featherstone Rovers	0	0	0	0	0
2022–25	Dewsbury Rams	42	2	0	0	8
	Total	250	47	0	0	188
Representative
Years	Team	Pld	T	G	FG	P
2010–24	Scotland	22	6	0	0	24
2012	England Knights	1	0	0	0	0

Coaching information
Club
Years	Team	Gms	W	D	L	W%
2024	Dewsbury Rams	9	1	0	8	11
- Source: As of 1 May 2024

Dale Ferguson (born 13 April 1988) is a former Scottish International professional rugby league footballer who played as Loose forward or Second-row

He previously played in the Super League for the Wakefield Trinity Wildcats and the Huddersfield Giants in two separate spells, as well spending time at Hull Kingston Rovers on loan from Huddersfield. He has also played for the Bradford Bulls in the Super League and the Championship. In 2019 he was loaned from the Giants to Featherstone in the Championship. He played one game for the England Knights side in 2012.

== Background ==
Ferguson was born in Pontefract, Yorkshire, England.

== Playing career ==
On 3 November 2011 The annual RLIF Awards dinner was held at the Tower of London, and Ferguson was named Scotland player of the year.

In February 2013, Hull Kingston Rovers signed Ferguson on a one-month loan deal. He scored his first try for The Robins in their 44–18 win over the Widnes club on 17 February 2013.

=== Bradford Bulls ===
Midway through the 2013 season the Bradford Bulls announced that they had signed Ferguson for the 2014 and 2015 seasons on a two-year deal.

==== 2014 ====
Ferguson missed the pre-season games against Hull FC and Dewsbury due to injury. He did feature in the friendly against Castleford Tigers.

He missed Rounds 1–7 due to injury. Ferguson featured in Round 8 (Salford) to Round 9 (Leeds) then in Round 15 (Wakefield Trinity Wildcats). Ferguson was injured for Rounds 16–22 but played in Round 23 against (Leeds) to Round 25 (Castleford Tigers). He featured in Round 4 (Oldham) in the Challenge Cup.

Even though the Bradford outfit were relegated and would play in the Championship in 2015, Ferguson committed himself to Bradford until the end of the 2016 season.

==== 2015 ====
Ferguson did not feature in any of the pre-season friendlies.

He featured in Round 3 (Featherstone Rovers) to Round 4 (Hunslet Hawks) then in Round 6 (Workington Town) to Round 7 (Halifax). He also featured in Round 9 (London Broncos) to Round 12 (Whitehaven). He played in Round 17 against Dewsbury to Round 21 against Sheffield. Ferguson played in Qualifier 1 against (Sheffield) to Qualifier 6 (Leigh). Ferguson played in the £1 Million Game (Wakefield Trinity Wildcats). He also featured in the Challenge Cup in Round 4 (Workington Town) to Round 5 (Hull Kingston Rovers).

==== 2016 ====
Ferguson featured in both pre-season friendlies against Leeds and Castleford Tigers.

He featured in Round 1 (Featherstone Rovers) to Round 4 against Leigh then in Round 6 against Batley. He played in Round 8 (Halifax) to Round 12 (London Broncos). Ferguson featured in Round 14 Sheffield to Round 17 (Workington Town) then in Round 22 (Oldham) to Round 23 (Featherstone Rovers). He played in the Championship Shield in Game 5 Swinton to the Final Sheffield. Ferguson played in the Challenge Cup in the 4th against Dewsbury.

At the end of the season Ferguson signed a two-year deal with Huddersfield.

Season	Appearances	Tries	Goals	F/G	Points
2014 Bradford Bulls	7	1	0	0	4
2015 Bradford Bulls	23	8	0	0	32
2016 Bradford Bulls	22	4	0	0	16
Total	52	13	0	0	52

=== Dewsbury Rams ===
On 13 October 2021 it was reported that he had signed for Dewsbury in the RFL Championship.

On 1 May 2024 it was reported that, after a disappointing start to the 2024 season, he had stepped down from the head coach role, but would remain in the squad as a player, with assistant coach Paul March taking over as Head Coach. Fergerson retired from rugby after sucstaing an injury in March 2025.

=== International career ===
Ferguson made his Scotland début in 2010, in a defeat by Wales. He was named in the Scotland squad for the 2013 Rugby League World Cup.

In October and November 2015, Ferguson played in the 2015 European Cup.
