= Kris Welham =

English rugby league footballer

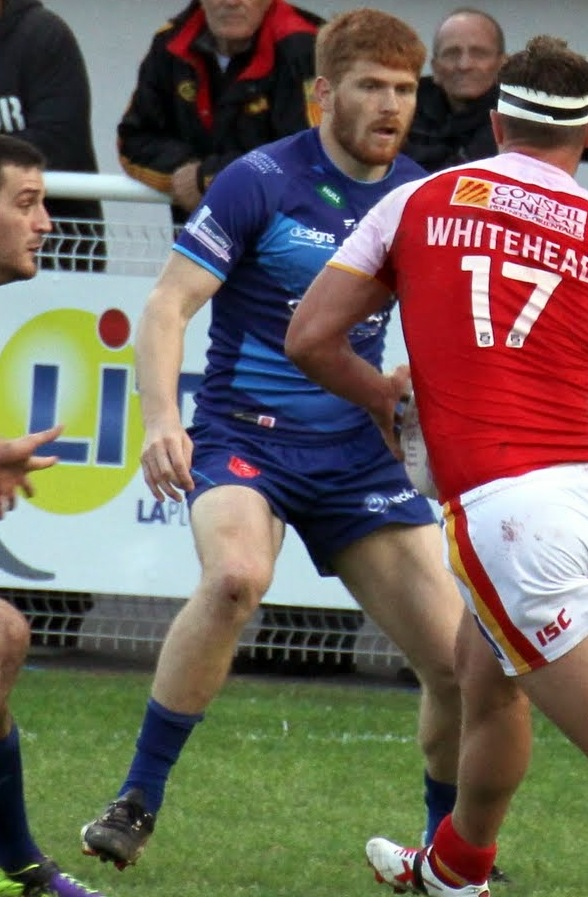

Personal information
- Born: 10 March 1987 (age 38) Hull, East Riding of Yorkshire, England
- Height: 6 ft 0 in (1.84 m)
- Weight: 14 st 13 lb (95 kg)

Playing information
- Position: Centre
Club
Years	Team	Pld	T	G	FG	P
2006–15	Hull Kingston Rovers	191	102	2	0	412
2014(loan)	→ Newcastle Thunder	2	1	0	0	4
2016–17	Bradford Bulls	30	29	0	0	116
2017–20	Salford Red Devils	102	31	0	0	124
2021	Featherstone Rovers	16	5	0	0	20
2022–25	Sheffield Eagles	108	50	1	0	202
	Total	449	218	3	0	878
Representative
Years	Team	Pld	T	G	FG	P
2011	England Knights	1	0	0	0	0
- Source: As of 29 January 2026

Kris Welham (born 10 March 1987) is a former English rugby league footballer who last played as a centre for Sheffield Eagles in the RFL Championship and the England Knights at international level.

He has played for Hull Kingston Rovers in the Super League and the Bradford Bulls in the Kingstone Press Championship.

== Background ==
Welham was born in Kingston upon Hull, East Riding of Yorkshire, England. His older brother, Liam Welham, was also a professional centre.

== Career ==
He came up through the ranks at Hull Kingston Rovers, and made his first team début in the 36–10 defeat at Leigh in August 2006. He scored on his National League début and followed that up with a try on his Super League début in the 40–24 defeat by Wigan on 2 September 2006 at Craven Park.

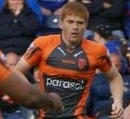
Welham playing for Hull KR in 2009

In February 2012, he signed a new three-year deal that kept him at Craven Park until 2015.

The 2012 season came to an abrupt end for the England Knights centre though, as he suffered a broken leg in a 13-10 defeat by the Catalans Dragons in June, causing him to miss the rest of the season.

Welham has currently appeared in every game during the 2014 season for Hull KR, scoring 5 tries in 14 games.

=== Bradford Bulls ===
Welham signed a two-year deal with the Bradford Bulls following the 2015 season.

2016 - 2016 Season

Welham featured in the pre-season friendly against Leeds.

Welham featured in Round 1 (Featherstone Rovers) to Round 6 (Batley Bulldogs). Welham played in Round 9 (Sheffield Eagles) to Round 23 (Featherstone Rovers). Welham then played in the Championship Shield Game 1 (Whitehaven) to Game 5 (Swinton Lions) then in Game 7 (Sheffield Eagles) to the Final (Sheffield Eagles). Welham played in the Challenge Cup in the 4th Round (Dewsbury Rams). He scored against Swinton Lions (4 tries), Leigh Centurions (1 try), Sheffield Eagles (4 tries), Dewsbury Rams (7 tries), Workington Town (1 try), London Broncos (2 tries), Halifax (3 tries), Oldham (6 tries) and Whitehaven (1 try).

=== Salford Red Devils ===
Following Bradford's liquidation prior to the 2017 season, Welham joined Super League side Salford Red Devils.

He played in the 2019 Super League Grand Final defeat by St. Helens at Old Trafford.

=== Featherstone Rovers ===
On 26 October 2020, it was announced that Welham would join Featherstone Rovers for the 2021 season on a one-year deal, with the option of a second year from 2021

Welham played for Featherstone in their 2021 Million Pound Game loss against Toulouse Olympique.

=== Sheffield Eagles ===
On 2 November 2021, it was reported that he had signed for Sheffield in the RFL Championship on a one-year deal He retired at the end of the 2025 season.

== Statistics ==
Statistics do not include pre-season friendlies.

Season	Appearance	Tries	Goals	F/G	Points
2016 Bradford Bulls	30	29	0	0	116
2017 Bradford Bulls	0	0	0	0	0
Total	30	29	0	0	116
