= Omari Caro =

Jamaica international rugby league footballer

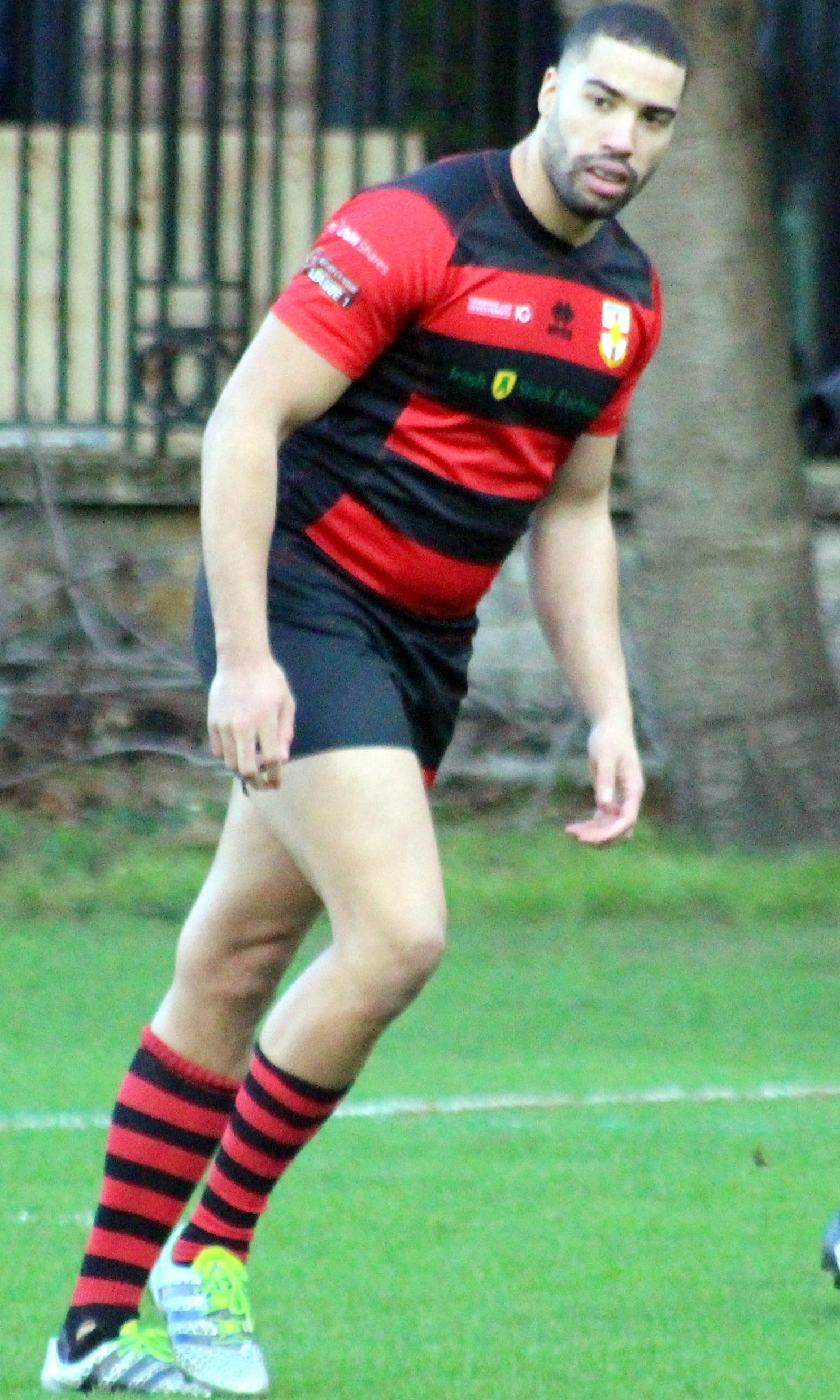

Personal information
- Born: 7 March 1991 (age 34) Hammersmith, London, England
- Height: 6 ft 3 in (1.91 m)
- Weight: 17 st 10 lb (112 kg)

Playing information
- Position: Wing, Centre, Second-row
Club
Years	Team	Pld	T	G	FG	P
2012	London Broncos	16	4	0	0	16
2013–14	Hull Kingston Rovers	26	20	0	0	80
2013(loan)	→ Gateshead Thunder	10	9	0	0	36
2014(loan)	→ Gateshead Thunder	8	3	0	0	12
2015–17	Bradford Bulls	40	31	5	0	134
2018–21	London Skolars	30	20	0	0	80
	Total	130	87	5	0	358
Representative
Years	Team	Pld	T	G	FG	P
2011–18	Jamaica	6	0	0	0	0
- Source: As of 8 January 2023

Omari Caro (born 7 March 1991) is a former Jamaican international rugby league footballer who last played as a winger for the London Skolars in League 1. Upon retiring from professional rugby, Omari is now a high school teacher.

He previously played for the London Broncos and Hull Kingston Rovers in the Super League, the Bradford Bulls in the Championship, and as a loan player for the Gateshead Thunder in League 1.

Caro is known for his pace, having won "Super League's fastest man" in 2012, with a time of 10.28 seconds for 90 metres while carrying a ball.

== Background ==
Caro was born in Hammersmith, London, England, and is of Jamaican descent through his father.

== Career ==
=== Bradford Bulls ===
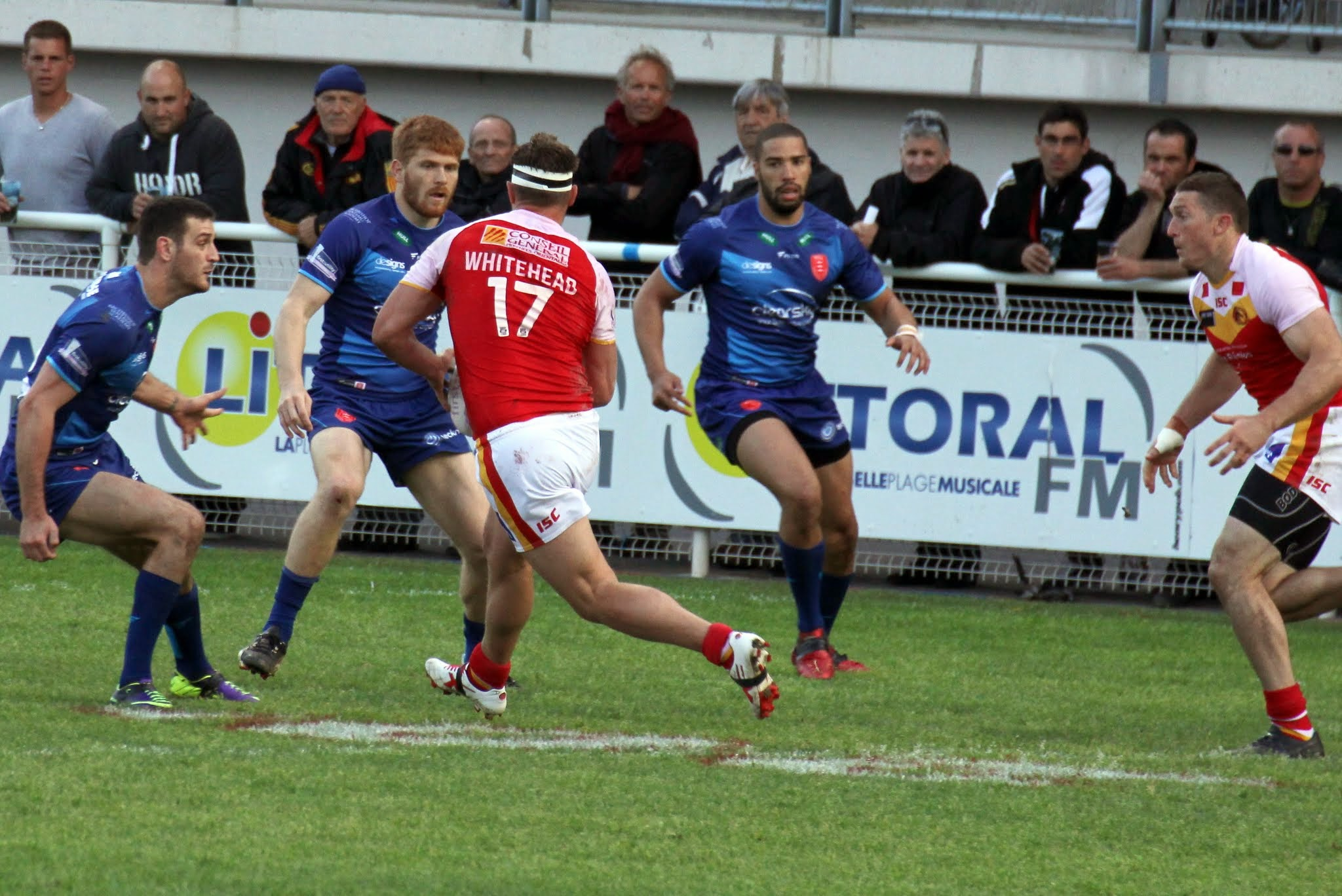
Caro playing for Hull Kingston Rovers in 2014

Caro joined the Bradford Bulls for the rest of the 2015 season.

2015 - 2015

He featured in Round 21 (Sheffield Eagles) to Round 23 (Halifax). Caro played in Qualifier 2 (Wakefield Trinity Wildcats) to Qualifier 5 (Hull Kingston Rovers) then in Qualifier 7 (Halifax). He scored against Leigh Centurions (3 tries), Halifax (1 try) and Widnes Vikings (1 try).

2016 - 2016

Caro featured in the pre-season friendlies against Leeds Rhinos and Castleford Tigers. He scored against Castleford Tigers (1 try).

Omari featured in Round 1 (Featherstone Rovers) to Round 4 (Leigh Centurions) then in Round 6 (Batley Bulldogs) to Round 16 (Dewsbury Rams). Caro played in Round 20 (Leigh Centurions) then in Round 22 (Oldham) to Round 23 (Featherstone Rovers). Caro played in the Challenge Cup in the 4th Round (Dewsbury Rams). He scored against Featherstone Rovers (3 tries), Swinton Lions (3 tries), Leigh Centurions (2 tries), Batley Bulldogs (1 try), Dewsbury Rams (3 tries, 3 goals), Sheffield Eagles (1 try), Workington Town (2 tries) and Oldham (5 tries). Midway through the season Caro signed an extension keeping him at the Bulls until 2017.

2017 - 2017

Caro resigned with the Bulls following the clubs liquidation at the end of the 2016 season.

He featured in the pre-season friendly against Huddersfield Giants.

Omari featured in Round 7 (Dewsbury Rams) to Round 12 (Toulouse Olympique) then in Round 16 (Dewsbury Rams) to Round 18 (Rochdale Hornets). Caro played in Round 23 (Swinton Lions). He featured in the Championship Shield Game 5 (Sheffield Eagles) to Game 7 (Rochdale Hornets). He scored against Dewsbury Rams (1 try, 1 goal), Featherstone Rovers (1 try), Sheffield Eagles (3 tries) and Rochdale Hornets (1 try, 1 goal).

Statistics do not include pre-season friendlies.

Season	Appearance	Tries	Goals	F/G	Points
2015 Bradford Bulls	8	5	0	0	20
2016 Bradford Bulls	19	20	3	0	86
2017 Bradford Bulls	13	6	2	0	28
Total	40	31	5	0	134

=== London Skolars ===
In December 2017 Caro signed for the London Skolars.

== International career ==
Omari Caro made his début for Jamaica in 2011, playing centre in the 4-40 defeat by the United States during the 2013 Rugby League World Cup qualifying tournament. In 2015, Caro played for Jamaica in their 2017 Rugby League World Cup qualifiers. In 2017, Caro played for Jamaica in their test match against France. In November 2018 Caro and his fellow Jamaican Reggae Warriors made history, achieving qualification for the first time to the Rugby League World Cup by beating Canada, 38-8 and then the US Hawks, 16-10. It was also Jamaica's first ever victory over the US in Rugby League.
