= Rhys Lovegrove =

Australian rugby league coach

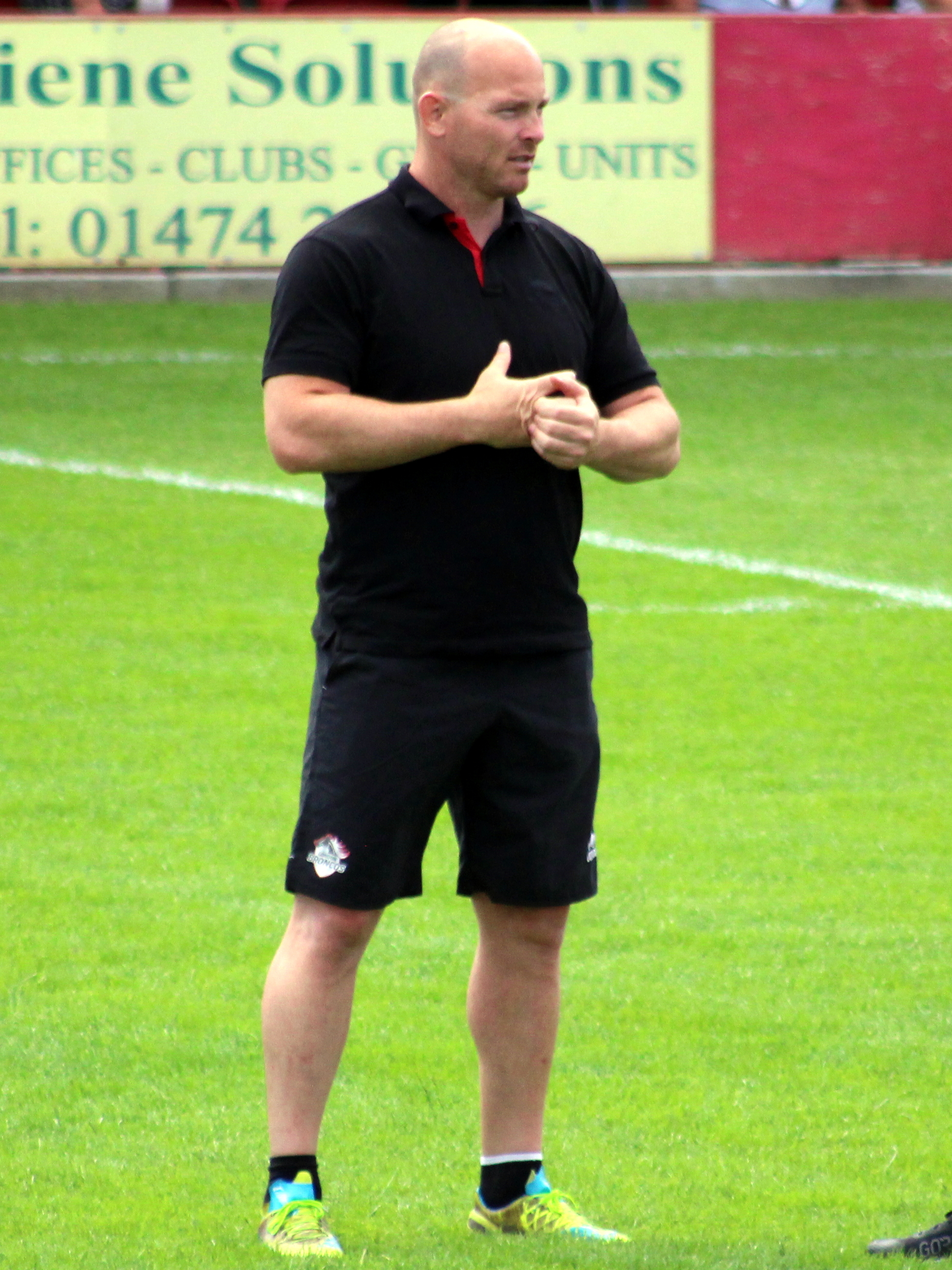

Personal information
- Full name: Rhys Houston Lovegrove
- Born: 11 March 1987 (age 39) Sydney, New South Wales, Australia
- Height: 6 ft 1 in (1.85 m)
- Weight: 16 st 3 lb (103 kg)

Playing information
- Position: Prop, Second-row, Loose forward
Club
Years	Team	Pld	T	G	FG	P
2007–14	Hull Kingston Rovers	160	19	0	0	76
2015	London Broncos	20	1	0	0	4
2016	Bradford Bulls	5	0	0	0	0
	Total	185	20	0	0	80

Coaching information
Club
Years	Team	Gms	W	D	L	W%
2019–23	Keighley Cougars	90	62	1	27	69
Representative
Years	Team	Gms	W	D	L	W%
2024–	Jamaica	2	0	0	2	0
- Source: As of 27 October 2025

Rhys Lovegrove (born 11 March 1987) is an Australian rugby league coach who is the head coach of Jamaica and a former assistant coach at the London Broncos in the Championship and a former professional rugby league footballer who played in the 2000s and 2010s.

He played for the Bradford Bulls, Hull Kingston Rovers and the London Broncos, primarily as a second-row forward and occasionally as a prop. After retiring from playing Lovegrove moved into coaching and took up his first head coaching role as the head coach of the Keighley Cougars at Cougar Park in June 2019.

== Background ==
Lovegrove was born in Sydney, New South Wales, Australia.

A Como Jannali Crocodiles junior who, while attending Endeavour Sports High School, played for the Australian Schoolboys Team in 2004.

== Playing career ==
He was initially signed by Hull Kingston Rovers on loan from the St George-Illawarra Dragons until the end of the 2007 Super League season, but then made the move permanent. In September 2014, he joined the London Broncos.

He was named in Scotland's initial 40-man squad for the 2008 Rugby League World Cup, but he was forced to withdraw through injury. Lovegrove was selected for the Scotland squad for the 2013 Rugby League World Cup.

== Coaching ==
=== Bradford Bulls ===
In August 2016 he announced his retirement due to injury from playing to join the coaching staff at the Bradford Bulls.

=== Keighley Cougars ===
Following periods on the coaching staff at Bradford and Doncaster, Lovegrove joined Keighley Cougars as assistant coach in January 2019 and was appointed as head coach in June 2019 following the sacking of Craig Lingard the previous month.

In 2022 Lovegrove coached Keighley to a perfect season as the Cougars won promotion from League 1 to the RFL Championship and was named as League 1 coach of the year in the RFL end-of-season awards.

Lovegrove left Keighley in May 2023, by mutual consent.

=== London Broncos ===
He joined the London Broncos as assistant coach in June 2023.

=== Hull KR ===
On 19 Oct 2023 he returned to Hull KR in the role of assistant coach
