= 2015 Bradford Bulls season =

- Championship Rank: 2nd
- Play-off result: Runners Up
- Challenge Cup: 5th Round
- 2015 record: Wins: 22; draws: 1; losses: 10
- Points scored: For: 1115; against: 707

Team information
- Chairman: Marc Green
- Head Coach: James Lowes
- Captain: Chev Walker
- Stadium: Odsal Stadium
- Avg. attendance: 5,239
- High attendance: 9,181 vs. Leigh Centurions

Top scorers
- Tries: Danny Williams (25)
- Goals: Ryan Shaw (111)
- Points: Ryan Shaw (286)
← 2014	List of seasons	2016 →

This article details the Bradford Bulls rugby league football club's 2015 season, the Bulls 1st season in the Championship.

== Season review ==
July 2014

Bradford were beaten 52-26 by Huddersfield Giants in Round 21 which confirmed their relegation into the Championship. Following this news Lee Gaskell and Dale Ferguson both signed new deals at the Bulls keeping them at Odsal until the end of the 2016 season. It was announced that loan signing Jamal Fakir would be returning home to France to join Lezignan after his loan expired in the off season. Prop forward Manase Manuokafoa also announced that he would leave the Bulls to play for the Widnes Vikings in the Super League for the 2015 season and onwards, meanwhile scrum half Luke Gale would join the Castleford Tigers to replace Marc Sneyd. Young prop forward Dan Fleming became the Bulls first new signing for 2015 as he signed a 2 Year Deal with Bradford from the Castleford Tigers. The Salford Red Devils out of favour fullback Jake Mullaney became the second new signing for 2015 as he signed a 1 Year Deal with the Bulls. July rounded off with the announcement that prop forward Adam Sidlow had re-signed with the Bulls for another year and home grown second-rower Tom Olbison had signed a new 2 Year Deal.

August 2014

It was announced that Dave Petersen would become James Lowes 3rd new signing for the 2015 season after putting pen to paper on a 1 Year Deal from the Mackay Cutters. Shortly after this news broke it was revealed that Featherstone Rovers winger Etu Uaisele would join the Bulls for the 2015 season. Australian fullback Brett Kearney will return home to Australia after the 2014 season. Young academy hooker Adam O'Brien signed a new 2 Year Deal with the Bulls becoming the 5th person to stay from the 2014 squad. Lowes also revealed that USA Tomahawks forward Mark Offerdahl signed a 1 Year Deal with the club. Youngster James Donaldson left the Bulls to sign a 2 Year Deal at Hull Kingston Rovers however centre Adam Henry re-signed with Bradford for a year. Academy product Danny Addy signed a new 2 Year Deal with Bradford despite interest from several Super League clubs. Veteran player Chev Walker announced that he would stay with Bradford for another year and put pen to paper on a 1 Year Deal. Youngsters Adam Brook and Sam Bates both signed 2 Year contracts with the Bulls keeping them at Odsal until the end of the 2016 season whilst fellow academy products Alex Mellor and Nathan Conroy signed 1 Year Deals. It was announced that Sam Wood would leave the club at the end of the season.

September 2014

September started with the news that on loan winger Danny Williams had signed a permanent 2 Year Deal with the Bulls whilst second row loanee Jay Pitts also signed permanently for the Bulls from Hull F.C. on a 2 Year Deal. During these announcements it was confirmed that Jamie Foster and Elliot Kear would leave the club at the end of the year whilst captain Matt Diskin would retire after a 14-year career. Young Warrington Wolves three-quarter Ryan Shaw signed a 1 Year Deal with the club. Meanwhile coach James Lowes announced another two new signings from Australian side Mackay Cutters, the first being prop Karl Davies on a 2 Year Deal and the second being utility three-quarter Chris Ulugia on a 2 Year Deal. Aussie centre Adrian Purtell re-signed with Bradford on a 1 Year Deal. Young Wakefield Trinity Wildcats scrum half Harry Siejka signed for Bradford on a 2 Year Deal.

October 2014

The fixtures for the 2015 Championship season were released and it was revealed that the Bulls would face Leigh Centurions away in the first round. American international Mark Offerdahl was released from his contract due to being injured but the Bulls have kept his registration in case he recovers well. Ex-assistant coach Karl Harrison returned to Bradford to be James Lowes assistant coach, meanwhile youngster Oliver Roberts left the Bulls to sign a 2 Year Deal with Super League side Huddersfield Giants.

== 2015 milestones ==
- Round 1: Jake Mullaney, Etu Uaisele, Harry Siejka, Paul Clough, Chris Ulugia, Lucas Walshaw and Samir Tahraoui made their debuts for the Bulls.
- Round 1: Jake Mullaney and Etu Uaisele scored their 1st tries for the Bulls.
- Round 1: Harry Siejka kicked his 1st goal for the Bulls.
- Round 1: Danny Addy made his 100th appearance for the Bulls.
- Round 2: Jean-Philippe Baile and Ryan Shaw made their debuts for the Bulls.
- Round 2: Lee Gaskell scored his 2nd hat-trick for the Bulls.
- Round 2: Lee Gaskell kicked his 1st goal for the Bulls.
- Round 3: Epalahame Lauaki made his debut for the Bulls.
- Round 3: Chris Ulugia and Jean-Philippe Baile scored their 1st tries for the Bulls.
- Round 3: Ryan Shaw kicked his 1st goal for the Bulls.
- Round 4: Daniel Fleming made his debut for the Bulls.
- Round 4: Adam O'Brien and Adam Sidlow made their 50th appearances for the Bulls.
- Round 4: Ryan Shaw scored his 1st try and 1st hat-trick for the Bulls.
- CCR4: Adrian Purtell scored his 1st hat-trick for the Bulls.
- CCR4: Samir Tahraoui and Harry Siejka scored their 1st tries for the Bulls.
- Round 7: Ryan Shaw reached 100 points for the Bulls.
- Round 8: Vila Halafihi made his debut for the Bulls.
- Round 8: Danny Addy reached 100 points for the Bulls.
- CCR5: Lucas Walshaw scored his 1st try for the Bulls.
- Round 10: Lee Gaskell scored his 3rd hat-trick for the Bulls.
- Round 10: Paul Clough scored his 1st try for the Bulls.
- Round 12: Adrian Purtell scored his 25th try and reached 100 points for the Bulls.
- Round 14: Tom Olbison made his 100th appearance for the Bulls.
- Round 14: James Mendeika made his debut for the Bulls.
- Round 16: James Mendeika scored his 1st try for the Bulls.
- Round 16: Danny Williams scored his 1st four-try haul and 1st hat-trick for the Bulls.
- Round 20: Jake Mullaney scored his 1st four-try haul and 1st hat-trick for the Bulls.
- Round 20: Danny Williams scored his 2nd hat-trick for the Bulls.
- Round 21: Omari Caro made his debut for the Bulls.
- Round 21: Jake Mullaney scored his 2nd hat-trick for the Bulls.
- Round 21: Ryan Shaw kicked his 100th goal for the Bulls.
- Round 22: Omari Caro scored his 1st try and 1st hat-trick for the Bulls.
- Round 23: James Clare made his debut for the Bulls.
- Super Eight's Game 1: Matt Ryan made his debut for the Bulls.
- Super Eight's Game 1: James Clare scored his 1st try for the Bulls.
- Super Eight's Game 1: Lee Gaskell scored his 4th hat-trick for the Bulls.
- Super Eight's Game 1: Lee Gaskell scored his 25th try and reached 100 points for the Bulls.
- Super Eight's Game 3: Dane Nielsen made his debut for the Bulls.
- Super Eight's Game 3: Jake Mullaney kicked his 1st drop goal for the Bulls.
- Super Eight's Game 4: Danny Addy kicked his 50th goal for the Bulls.
- Super Eight's Game 6: Danny Williams scored his 25th try and reached 100 points for the Bulls.
- Super Eight's Game 6: Danny Addy reached 200 points for the Bulls.
- Super Eight's Game 7: Jay Pitts and Adam Henry made their 50th appearance for the Bulls.
- Super Eight's Game 7: Matt Ryan scored his 1st try for the Bulls.

== Pre-season friendlies ==
LEGEND
Win
Draw
Loss

Bulls score is first.

Date	Competition	Vrs	H/A	Venue	Result	Score	Tries	Goals	Att	Report
10 January 2015	Pre Season	Castleford Tigers	A	The Jungle	L	14-22	Pitts, Shaw, Purtell	Siejka 1/3	3,844	Report
25 January 2015	Pre Season	Leeds Rhinos	A	Headingley Stadium	L	14-34	Shaw, Ulugia, Gaskell	Siejka 0/2, Gaskell 1/1	11,608	Report

== Player appearances ==
- Friendly games only

FB=Fullback	C=Centre	W=Winger	SO=Stand off	SH=Scrum half	P=Prop	H=Hooker	SR=Second row	LF=Loose forward	B=Bench

No	Player	1	2
1	Jake Mullaney	FB	FB
2	Etu Uaisele	W	
3	Adrian Purtell	C	C
4	Matty Blythe		
5	Danny Williams	W	W
6	Lee Gaskell	SO	SO
7	Harry Siejka	SH	SH
8	Paul Clough	P	P
9	Adam O'Brien	H	H
10	Adam Sidlow	P	B
11	Tom Olbison	B	SR
12	Dale Ferguson		
13	Danny Addy	B	x
14	Jay Pitts	SR	L
15	Daniel Fleming		
16	Karl Davies	B	B
17	Jean-Philippe Baile	C	
19	Chris Ulugia	B	B
20	Adam Henry	x	B
21	Dave Petersen		
22	Chev Walker	L	C
23	Alex Mellor	B	SR
24	Lucas Walshaw	SR	B
25	Nathan Conroy	B	B
26	Vila Halafihi	B	B
27	Ryan Shaw	B	W
28	Samir Tahraoui	B	P
29	Adam Brook	B	B
30	Sam Bates	x	x
31	Epalahame Lauaki	x	x
n/a	Ross Oakes	x	B
n/a	Ethan Ryan	x	B
n/a	Charlie Martin	x	B
n/a	Liam Kirk	x	B

= Injured

= Suspended

== 2015 Championship table ==
Pos	Team	Pld	W	D	L	PF	PA	PD	Pts	Qualification
1	Leigh Centurions	23	21	1	1	972	343	+629	43	The Qualifiers
2	Bradford Bulls	23	18	1	4	828	387	+441	37	The Qualifiers
3	Sheffield Eagles	23	17	0	6	586	451	+135	34	The Qualifiers
4	Halifax	23	16	0	7	646	377	+269	32	The Qualifiers
5	Featherstone Rovers	23	13	0	10	633	565	+68	26	Championship Shield
6	Dewsbury Rams	23	12	1	10	490	461	+29	25	Championship Shield
7	London Broncos	23	12	0	11	538	510	+28	24	Championship Shield
8	Workington Town	23	7	1	15	379	631	−252	15	Championship Shield
9	Batley Bulldogs	23	7	0	16	421	539	−118	14	Championship Shield
10	Whitehaven	23	7	0	16	418	671	−253	14	Championship Shield
11	Hunslet Hawks	23	5	0	18	362	769	−407	10	Championship Shield
12	Doncaster	23	1	0	22	282	851	−569	2	Championship Shield

Source: Rugby League Project
Rules for classification: 1) Points; 2) Points difference; 3) Number of points scored;

2015 Super 8 Qualifiers

Pos	Team	Pld	W	D	L	PF	PA	PD	Pts	Qualification
1	Hull Kingston Rovers	7	7	0	0	234	118	+116	14	2016 Super League
2	Widnes Vikings	7	5	0	2	232	70	+162	10	2016 Super League
3	Salford Red Devils	7	5	0	2	239	203	+36	10	2016 Super League
4	Wakefield Trinity Wildcats (W)	7	3	0	4	153	170	−17	6	Million Pound Game
5	Bradford Bulls	7	3	0	4	167	240	−73	6	Million Pound Game
6	Halifax	7	2	0	5	162	186	−24	4	2016 Championship
7	Sheffield Eagles	7	2	0	5	152	267	−115	4	2016 Championship
8	Leigh Centurions	7	1	0	6	146	231	−85	2	2016 Championship

Source: Rugby League Project
Rules for classification: 1) Points; 2) Points difference; 3) Number of points scored;
(W) Million Pound Game Winner

== 2015 fixtures and results ==
LEGEND
Win
Draw
Loss

2015 Championship Fixtures

Date	Competition	Rnd	Vrs	H/A	Venue	Result	Score	Tries	Goals	Att	Live on TV	Report
15 February 2015	Championship	1	Leigh Centurions	A	Leigh Sports Village	L	24-36	O'Brien (2), Mullaney, Uaisele, Walker	Siejka 2/5	7,449	-	Report
22 February 2015	Championship	2	Whitehaven RLFC	H	Odsal Stadium	W	34-4	Gaskell (3), Pitts, Purtell, Sidlow	Siejka 2/3, Gaskell 3/3	4,891	-	Report
1 March 2015	Championship	3	Featherstone Rovers	A	Post Office Road	W	40-4	Gaskell (2), Ulugia (2), Baile, O'Brien, Purtell	Shaw 6/7	6,346	-	Report
8 March 2015	Championship	4	Hunslet Hawks	H	Odsal Stadium	W	56-6	Shaw (3), Mullaney (2), O'Brien (2), Gaskell, Olbison, Williams	Shaw 8/10	5,019	-	Report
15 March 2015	Championship	5	Batley Bulldogs	A	Mount Pleasant	W	26-19	Mullaney, Shaw, Ulugia, Williams	Shaw 5/5	2,223	-	Report
29 March 2015	Championship	6	Workington Town	H	Odsal Stadium	W	36-6	Henry (2), Williams (2), Gaskell, Mullaney, Pitts	Shaw 4/7	4,238	-	Report
3 April 2015	Championship	7	Halifax RLFC	H	Odsal Stadium	W	32-19	Gaskell, Henry, Pitts, Shaw, Williams	Shaw 6/6	6,134	-	Report
6 April 2015	Championship	8	Dewsbury Rams	A	Rams Stadium	W	30-16	Addy (2), Gaskell, Pitts, Shaw, Uaisele	Shaw 3/6	4,068	-	Report
12 April 2015	Championship	9	London Broncos	H	Odsal Stadium	W	28-2	Gaskell, O'Brien, Pitts, Uaisele, Ulugia	Shaw 4/5	4,023	-	Report
26 April 2015	Championship	10	Doncaster RLFC	A	Keepmoat Stadium	W	56-38	Gaskell (3), Ferguson (2), Uaisele (2), Clough, Henry, Shaw	Shaw 8/10	2,276	-	Report
3 May 2015	Championship	11	Sheffield Eagles	H	Odsal Stadium	W	46-12	Ferguson (2), Henry, Olbison, Purtell, Sidlow, Uaisele, Williams	Addy 7/8	4,847	-	Report
10 May 2015	Championship	12	Whitehaven RLFC	A	Recreation Ground	W	32-16	Purtell (2), Williams (2), Addy, Gaskell	Shaw 4/6	1,338	-	Report
23 May 2015	Summer Bash	14	Halifax RLFC	N	Bloomfield Road	W	18-4	Purtell (2), Shaw	Shaw 2/2, Addy 1/1	8,560	Sky Sports	Report
31 May 2015	Championship	15	London Broncos	A	The Hive	W	36-18	Henry, O'Brien, Shaw, Sidlow, Uaisele, Williams	Shaw 6/6	1,101	-	Report
7 June 2015	Championship	16	Doncaster RLFC	H	Odsal Stadium	W	72-6	Williams (4), Crossley (2), Mendeika (2), Addy, Gaskell, Henry, Shaw, Sidlow, Uaisele	Shaw 1/4, Addy 7/10	4,982	-	Report
14 June 2015	Championship	17	Dewsbury Rams	H	Odsal Stadium	W	22-18	Purtell (2), Addy, Henry	Shaw 3/4	3,998	-	Report
21 June 2015	Championship	18	Workington Town	A	Derwent Park	W	38-16	Henry (2), Mullaney (2), Lauaki, Sidlow, Williams	Shaw 5/7	1,063	-	Report
28 June 2015	Championship	19	Batley Bulldogs	H	Odsal Stadium	W	34-16	Blythe (2), Henry (2), Mendeika, Pitts, Williams	Shaw 3/7	5,089	-	Report
1 July 2015	Championship	13	Featherstone Rovers	H	Odsal Stadium	L	18-37	Mendeika (2), Walker	Shaw 3/3	5,044	-	Report
5 July 2015	Championship	20	Hunslet Hawks	A	South Leeds Stadium	W	68-6	Mullaney (4), Williams (3), Blythe, Ferguson, Mendeika, O'Brien, Shaw, Uaisele	Shaw 8/13	1,676	-	Report
12 July 2015	Championship	21	Sheffield Eagles	A	Keepmoat Stadium	L	30-32	Mullaney (3), Pitts, Shaw	Shaw 5/5	2,153	-	Report
19 July 2015	Championship	22	Leigh Centurions	H	Odsal Stadium	D	36-36	Caro (3), Addy, Blythe, Pitts	Shaw 6/7	9,181	-	Report
26 July 2015	Championship	23	Halifax RLFC	A	The Shay	L	16-20	Caro, Henry, Pitts	Shaw 2/3	4,589	-	Report

2015 Super 8 Qualifiers

Date	Competition	Rnd	Vrs	H/A	Venue	Result	Score	Tries	Goals	Att	Live on TV	Report
9 August 2015	Championship	S1	Sheffield Eagles	H	Odsal Stadium	W	42-10	Gaskell (3), Williams (2), Clare, Henry, Pitts	Addy 5/8	6,032	-	Report
15 August 2015	Championship	S2	Wakefield Trinity Wildcats	A	Belle Vue	L	18-48	Clare, Ferguson, Purtell	Addy 3/3	3,985	Sky Sports	Report
23 August 2015	Championship	S3	Salford Red Devils	H	Odsal Stadium	W	41-10	Mullaney (2), Addy, Clare, Ferguson, Purtell, Williams	Addy 6/7, Mullaney 1 DG	6,593	-	Report
6 September 2015	Championship	S4	Widnes Vikings	H	Odsal Stadium	L	12-56	Caro, Purtell	Addy 2/2	6,881	-	Report
12 September 2015	Championship	S5	Hull Kingston Rovers	A	Craven Park	L	4-48	Mendeika	Addy 0/1	6,605	Sky Sports	Report
19 September 2015	Championship	S6	Leigh Centurions	A	Leigh Sports Village	W	32-16	Blythe (2), Williams (2), Mullaney	Addy 6/7	4,621	Sky Sports	Report
26 September 2015	Championship	S7	Halifax RLFC	H	Odsal Stadium	L	18-52	Shaw (2), Ryan	Shaw 3/3	5,163	Sky Sports	Report

== Million pound game ==
After the Super 8 qualifiers, Wakefield Trinity Wildcats finished 4th in the table and Championship side Bradford Bulls finished 5th meaning that the two teams would meet in a play-off match to determine who would join Hull Kingston Rovers, Widnes Vikings and Salford Red Devils in next seasons Super League.

LEGEND
Win
Draw
Loss

Date	Competition	Vrs	H/A	Venue	Result	Score	Tries	Goals	Att	Live on TV	Report
3 October 2015	Million Pound Game	Wakefield Trinity Wildcats	A	Bell Vue	L	16-24	Blythe, Purtell, Williams	Addy 2/4	7,246	Sky Sports	Report

2015 Million Pound Game
Bradford Bulls	Positions	Wakefield Trinity Wildcats
1. Jake Mullaney	Fullback	34. Jordan Tansey
4. Matty Blythe	Winger	4. Reece Lyne
37. Dane Nielsen	Centre	39. Bill Tupou
3. Adrian Purtell	Centre	28. Joe Arundel
5. Danny Williams	Winger	24. Tom Johnstone
6. Lee Gaskell	Stand off	6. Jacob Miller
7. Harry Seijka	Scrum half	14. Pita Godinet
8. Paul Clough	Prop	8. Nick Scruton
9. Adam O'Brien	Hooker	35. Michael Sio
10. Adam Sidlow	Prop	16. Michael Simon
11. Tom Olbison	2nd row	12. Danny Kirmond
12. Dale Ferguson	2nd row	13. Danny Washbrook
13. Danny Addy	Loose forward	26. Chris Annakin
14. Jay Pitts	Interchange	11. Ali Lauitiiti
17. Jean-Philippe Baile	Interchange	37. Anthony Mullally
31. Epalahame Lauaki	Interchange	40. Scott Moore
32. Steve Crossley	Interchange	41. Andy Yates
James Lowes	Coach	Brian Smith

== Player appearances ==
- Championship only

FB=Fullback	C=Centre	W=Winger	SO=Stand-off	SH=Scrum half	PR=Prop	H=Hooker	SR=Second row	L=Loose forward	B=Bench

No	Player	1	2	3	4	5	6	7	8	9	10	11	12	14	15	16	17	18	19	13	20	21	22	23	-	S1	S2	S3	S4	S5	S6	S7
1	Jake Mullaney	FB	FB	SH	SH	FB	FB					FB					SO	FB			SO	SO			-	FB		SO	SO		FB	x
2	Etu Uaisele	W	W	W	W		x	x	W	W	W	W	W	W	W	W	W	x	x	x	W	W	x	x	-	x	x	x	x	x	x	x
3	Adrian Purtell	C	C	C	C		C	C	C	C		C	C	C	C	C	C	C	C	C			SO		-	C	C	C	C	SO	SO	x
4	Matty Blythe																B	B	SO	B	C	C	C	C	-	B	C	B	B		C	C
5	Danny Williams	W	W	Red card	W	W	W	W	W			W	W	W	W	W	W	W	W	W	W		W	x	-	W	W	W	W	W	W	x
6	Lee Gaskell	SO	SO	SO	SO	SO	SO	SO	SO	SO	SO	SO	SO	SO	SO	SO									-	SO	SO					B
7	Harry Siejka	SH	SH	Red card	Red card	SH	SH	SH	SH	SH								SO		SO					-		B			B	SH	SH
8	Paul Clough	P	P	P	P	P	P	P	P	P	P	P	P	P	P	P	P	P	P	P	P		P	P	-	P	P	P	P	P	P	P
9	Adam O'Brien	H	H	H	H	H	H	H	H	H	H	H	H	H	H	H	H	H	H	H	H	H	H	B	-	H	H	H	H	H	H	x
10	Adam Sidlow	P	P	P	P	P		P	P	P	P	P	P	P	P	P	P	P	P	P	P	P	P	x	-	P	P	P	P	P	P	x
11	Tom Olbison	SR	SR	B	B	SR	SR	SR		SR	SR	SR	SR	SR	SR	SR	SR	SR	SR	SR	SR		SR	SR	-	SR	SR	SR	SR	SR	SR	x
12	Dale Ferguson			B	B		B	B		B	SR	SR	B				SR	SR	SR	SR	B	SR			-	SR	SR	SR	SR	B	B	x
13	Danny Addy	L					L	L	L	L	SH	SH	SH	SH	SH	SH	SH	SH	SH	SH	SH	SH	SH	SH	-	SH	SH	SH	SH	SH	L	x
14	Jay Pitts	SR	SR	SR	SR	L	SR	SR	SR	SR	L	L	SR	SR	SR	SR	L	L	L	L	L	L	SR	B	-	L	L	L	L	L	SR	L
15	Daniel Fleming				B	B	B	B	B	B	B	B	B				x	x	B	B	B	B	x	B	-	x	x	x	x	x	x	B
16	Karl Davies																								-							
17	Jean-Philippe Baile	x	C	C	C	x	B	B	x	x	C	x	B	B	B	B	x	x	x	x	x	x	x	x	-	x	x	x	x	x	x	B
19	Chris Ulugia	B	x	W	x	W	x	W	x	W	x	x	x	x	x	x	x	x	x	x	x	x	x	x	-	x	x	x	x	x	x	x
20	Adam Henry					C	C	C	C	C	W	C	C	C	C	C	C	C	C	C		C	C	C	-	C						C
21	Dave Petersen																								-	x	x	x	x	x	x	x
22	Chev Walker	C	L						B		C								B	B	SR	SR	L	L	-					C		
23	Alex Mellor	B	B	L	L					B	B	B	L	L	L	L									-			B	B			SR
24	Lucas Walshaw	B	B	SR	SR	SR	x	x	SR	x	x	x	x	x	x	x	x	x	x	x	x	B	B	SR	-	x	x	x	x	x	x	x
25	Nathan Conroy	x	x	x	x	B	x	x	x	x	x	x	x	x	x	x	x	x	x	x	x	x	x	x	-	x	x	x	x	x	x	x
26	Vila Halafihi	x	x	x	x	x	x	x	B	x	B	x	x	x	x	x	x	x	B	x	B	x	x	H	-	x	x	x	x	x	x	H
27	Ryan Shaw	x	B	FB	FB	C	W	FB	FB	FB	FB	B	FB	FB	FB	FB	B	W	W	W	FB	W	FB	FB	-	x	x	x	x	x	x	FB
28	Samir Tahraoui	B	B	B	B	B	P		B								x	x	x	x	x	x	x	x	-	x	x	x	x	x	x	x
29	Adam Brook	x	x	x	x	x	x	x	x	x	x	x	x	x	x	x	x	x	x	x	x	x	x	x	-	x	x	x	x	x	x	x
30	Sam Bates	x	x	x	x	x	x	x	x	x	x	x	x	x	x	x	x	x	x	x	x	x	x	x	-	x	x	x	x	x	x	x
31	Epalahame Lauaki	x	x	B	x	B	B	B		B		B	B	B	B	B	B	B				P	B	B	-	B	B	B	B	B	B	P
32	Steve Crossley	x	x	x	x	x	x	x	x	x	B			B	B	B	B	B	B	B	B	B	B	P	-	B	B	B	B	B	B	B
33	James Mendeika	x	x	x	x	x	x	x	x	x	x	x	x	B	B	B	FB	B	FB	FB	C	FB	B	SO	-	x	x	x	x	FB	x	SO
34	Omari Caro	x	x	x	x	x	x	x	x	x	x	x	x	x	x	x	x	x	x	x	x	B	W	W	-		W	W	W	W		W
35	James Clare	x	x	x	x	x	x	x	x	x	x	x	x	x	x	x	x	x	x	x	x	x	x	W	-	W	FB	FB	FB		W	W
36	Matt Ryan	x	x	x	x	x	x	x	x	x	x	x	x	x	x	x	x	x	x	x	x	x	x	x	-	B	B			SR	B	SR
37	Dane Nielsen	x	x	x	x	x	x	x	x	x	x	x	x	x	x	x	x	x	x	x	x	x	x	x	-	x	x	C	C	C	C	x

= Injured

= Suspended

== Challenge Cup ==
LEGEND
Win
Draw
Loss

Date	Competition	Rnd	Vrs	H/A	Venue	Result	Score	Tries	Goals	Att	TV	Report
22 March 2015	Cup	4th	Workington Town	H	Odsal Stadium	W	74-6	Purtell (3), Shaw (2), Tahraoui (2), Gaskell, Henry, Pitts, Sidlow, Siejka, Williams	Shaw 11/13	2,412	-	Report
19 April 2015	Cup	5th	Hull Kingston Rovers	H	Odsal Stadium	L	30-50	Addy, Ferguson, Gaskell, O'Brien, Walshaw	Shaw 5/5	4,538	-	Report

== Player appearances ==
- Challenge Cup games only

FB=Fullback	C=Centre	W=Winger	SO=Stand off	SH=Scrum half	P=Prop	H=Hooker	SR=Second row	L=Loose forward	B=Bench

No	Player	4	5
1	Jake Mullaney	FB	
2	Etu Uaisele	B	W
3	Adrian Purtell	C	
4	Matty Blythe		
5	Danny Williams	W	
6	Lee Gaskell	SO	SO
7	Harry Siejka	SH	
8	Paul Clough	P	P
9	Adam O'Brien	H	H
10	Adam Sidlow	P	P
11	Tom Olbison	SR	SR
12	Dale Ferguson	B	SR
13	Danny Addy		SH
14	Jay Pitts	L	L
15	Daniel Fleming	x	B
16	Karl Davies		
17	Jean-Philippe Baile	x	B
19	Chris Ulugia	x	W
20	Adam Henry	C	C
21	Dave Petersen		
22	Chev Walker		C
23	Alex Mellor		B
24	Lucas Walshaw	SR	B
25	Nathan Conroy	x	x
26	Vila Halafihi	x	x
27	Ryan Shaw	W	FB
28	Samir Tahraoui	B	
29	Adam Brook	x	x
30	Sam Bates	x	x
31	Epalahame Lauaki	B	x

== 2015 squad statistics ==
- Appearances and points include (Super League, Challenge Cup and Play-offs) as of 3 October 2015.

No	Player	Position	Age	Previous club	Apps	Tries	Goals	DG	Points
1	Jake Mullaney	Fullback	24	Salford Red Devils	17	17	0	1	69
2	Etu Uaisele	Wing	30	Featherstone Rovers	17	9	0	0	36
3	Adrian Purtell	Centre	30	Penrith Panthers	26	16	0	0	64
4	Matty Blythe	Centre	26	Warrington Wolves	15	7	0	0	28
5	Danny Williams	Wing	28	Salford Red Devils	26	25	0	0	100
6	Lee Gaskell	Stand-off	24	St Helens R.F.C.	21	20	3	0	86
7	Harry Siejka	Scrum-half	23	Wakefield Trinity Wildcats	15	1	4	0	12
8	Paul Clough	Prop	27	St Helens R.F.C.	32	1	0	0	4
9	Adam O'Brien	Hooker	21	Bradford Bulls Academy	32	9	0	0	36
10	Adam Sidlow	Prop	27	Salford Red Devils	30	6	0	0	24
11	Tom Olbison	Second row	23	Bradford Bulls Academy	30	2	0	0	8
12	Dale Ferguson	Second row	26	Huddersfield Giants	23	8	0	0	32
13	Danny Addy	Loose forward	24	Bradford Bulls Academy	27	8	39	0	110
14	Jay Pitts	Second row	25	Hull F.C.	33	11	0	0	44
15	Daniel Fleming	Prop	22	Castleford Tigers	15	0	0	0	0
16	Karl Davies	Prop	22	Mackay Cutters	0	0	0	0	0
17	Jean-Philippe Baile	Centre	27	Catalans Dragons	13	1	0	0	4
19	Chris Ulugia	Centre	23	Mackay Cutters	6	4	0	0	16
20	Adam Henry	Centre	23	Sydney Roosters	22	15	0	0	60
21	Dave Petersen	Loose forward	22	Mackay Cutters	0	0	0	0	0
22	Chev Walker	Second row	32	Hull Kingston Rovers	12	2	0	0	8
23	Alex Mellor	Second row	20	Bradford Bulls Academy	15	0	0	0	0
24	Lucas Walshaw	Second row	22	Wakefield Trinity Wildcats	11	1	0	0	4
25	Nathan Conroy	Hooker	19	Bradford Bulls Academy	1	0	0	0	0
26	Vila Halafihi	Hooker	21	Penrith Panthers	6	0	0	0	0
27	Ryan Shaw	Fullback	22	Warrington Wolves	25	16	111	0	286
28	Samir Tahraoui	Prop	24	Whitehaven	8	2	0	0	8
29	Adam Brook	Scrum-half	19	Bradford Bulls Academy	0	0	0	0	0
30	Sam Bates	Prop	19	Bradford Bulls Academy	0	0	0	0	0
31	Epalahame Lauaki	Prop	31	Wigan Warriors	24	1	0	0	4
32	Steve Crossley	Prop	24	Castleford Tigers	20	2	0	0	8
33	James Mendeika	Centre	23	Featherstone Rovers	13	7	0	0	28
34	Omari Caro	Wing	24	Hull Kingston Rovers	8	5	0	0	20
35	James Clare	Wing	24	Castleford Tigers	7	3	0	0	12
36	Matt Ryan	Second row	27	Wakefield Trinity Wildcats	5	1	0	0	4
37	Dane Nielsen	Centre	30	St. George Illawarra Dragons	5	0	0	0	0

= Injured = Suspended

== 2015 transfers in/out ==
In

	Name	Position	Signed from	Date
(England)	Dan Fleming	Prop	Castleford Tigers	July 2014
(Australia)	Jake Mullaney	Fullback	Salford Red Devils	July 2014
(England)	Dave Petersen	Loose forward	Mackay Cutters	August 2014
(Tonga)	Etu Uaisele	Wing	Featherstone Rovers	August 2014
(United States)	Mark Offerdahl	Prop	St George Illawarra Dragons	August 2014
(England)	Vila Halafihi	Hooker	Penrith Panthers	August 2014
(England)	Danny Williams	Wing	Salford Red Devils	September 2014
(England)	Jay Pitts	Second row	Hull F.C.	September 2014
(England)	Ryan Shaw	Centre	Warrington Wolves	September 2014
(Australia)	Karl Davies	Prop	Mackay Cutters	September 2014
(New Zealand)	Chris Ulugia	Centre	Mackay Cutters	September 2014
(France)	Jean Philippe Baile	Centre	Catalans Dragons	September 2014
(Algeria)	Samir Tahraoui	Prop	Whitehaven	September 2014
(England)	Lucas Walshaw	Second row	Wakefield Trinity Wildcats	September 2014
(England)	Paul Clough	Prop	St Helens R.F.C.	September 2014
(Australia)	Harry Siejka	Stand-off	Wakefield Trinity Wildcats	September 2014
(Tonga)	Epalahame Lauaki	Prop	Wigan Warriors	December 2014
(Australia)	Dane Neilsen	Centre	St George Illawarra Dragons	August 2015

Out

	Name	Position	Club Signed	Date
(France)	Jamal Fakir	Prop	Lézignan Sangliers	July 2014
(Tonga)	Manase Manuokafoa	Prop	Widnes Vikings	July 2014
(Australia)	Brett Kearney	Fullback	N/A	August 2014
(England)	James Donaldson	Loose forward	Hull Kingston Rovers	August 2014
(England)	Luke Gale	Scrum-half	Castleford Tigers	August 2014
(England)	Sam Wood	Centre	N/A	August 2014
(England)	Jamie Foster	Wing	N/A	September 2014
(Wales)	Elliot Kear	Wing	London Welsh (Rugby Union)	September 2014
(England)	Matt Diskin	Hooker	Retirement	September 2014
(United States)	Mark Offerdahl	Prop	Injured	October 2014
(England)	Oliver Roberts	Second row	Huddersfield Giants	October 2014
(England)	Brad Adams	Second row	Gloucestershire All Golds	October 2014
