= John Clough =

John or Jack Clough may refer to:

- John Clough (rugby league) (born 1984), English rugby league footballer
- Jack Clough (referee) (John Holden Clough, fl. 1957–59), English football referee
- Jack Clough (footballer) (John H. Clough, 1898–?), English footballer
