= Danny Williams (rugby) =

England international rugby league & rugby union footballer

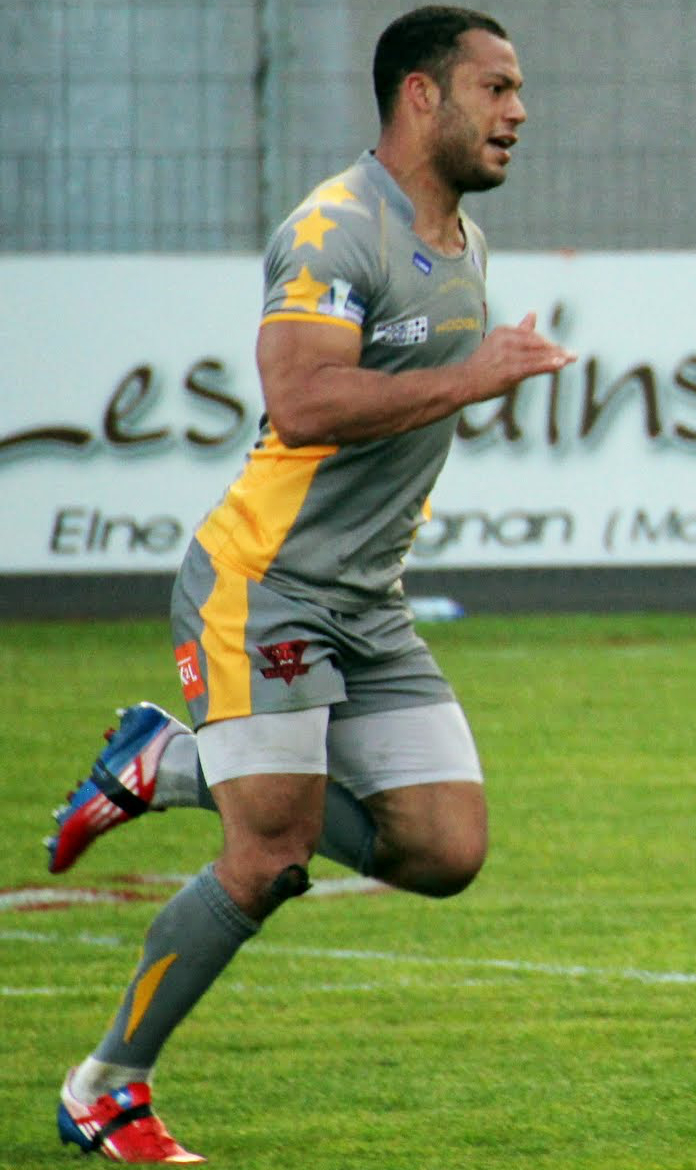

Personal information
- Born: 26 September 1986 (age 40) Leeds, West Yorkshire, England

Playing information
- Height: 6 ft 0 in (183 cm)
- Weight: 14 st 0 lb (89 kg)

Rugby league
- Position: Wing
Club
| Years | Team | Pld | T | G | FG | P |
|---|---|---|---|---|---|---|
| 2006–08 | Leeds Rhinos | 18 | 12 | 0 | 0 | 48 |
| 2007–08 | Castleford Tigers | 9 | 10 | 0 | 0 | 40 |
| 2008 | Hull FC | 3 | 0 | 0 | 0 | 0 |
| 2011–14 | Salford City Reds | 56 | 31 | 0 | 0 | 124 |
| 2014–16 | Bradford Bulls | 48 | 37 | 0 | 0 | 148 |
| | Total | 134 | 90 | 0 | 0 | 360 |
Representative
| Years | Team | Pld | T | G | FG | P |
| 2006 | England | 2 | 0 | 0 | 0 | 0 |

Rugby union
- Position: Wing
Club
| Years | Team | Pld | T | G | FG | P |
|---|---|---|---|---|---|---|
| 2008–11 | Newcastle Falcons | 47 | 12 | 0 | 0 | 60 |

Daniel Williams (born 26 September 1986) is an English rugby league footballer who last played for the Bradford Bulls in the Championship.

Williams played for Leeds, and spent 2007 on loan at Castleford, and, due to injuries to first choice wingers Gareth Raynor and Matt Sing, has moved to Hull FC for the start of 2008's Super League XIII.

After returning from loan at Hull F.C. to Leeds Rhinos, it was announced that Williams was switching codes, to join Guinness Premiership side, Newcastle Falcons, in time for the start of their 2008/09 campaign. On 11 January he scored a try for the Falcons in their shock victory over Gloucester RFC.

On 7 June 2011, Williams took a route back into rugby league by agreeing a one-month trial period with Super League club Hull Kingston Rovers

Williams signed a 2½-year deal with Super League club Salford City Reds on 8 July 2011.

== Bradford Bulls ==
2014 - 2014 Season

Williams featured in Round 19 (Catalans Dragons) to Round 20 (St. Helens). Danny then played in Round 22 (Wigan Warriors) to Round 26 (Widnes Vikings). He scored against Wigan Warriors (1 try) and Leeds Rhinos (1 try).

2015 - 2015 Season

Williams signed for Bradford on a permanent basis on a 2 Year Deal. He featured in the pre-season friendlies against Castleford Tigers and Leeds Rhinos.

He featured in Round 1 (Leigh Centurions) to Round 2 (Whitehaven). Then in Round 4 (Hunslet Hawks) to Round 8 (Dewsbury Rams). Williams played in Round 11 (Sheffield Eagles) to Round 20 (Hunslet Hawks) then in Round 22 (Leigh Centurions). Williams played in Qualifier 1 (Sheffield Eagles) to Qualifier 6 (Leigh Centurions). Danny played in the £1 Million Game (Wakefield Trinity Wildcats). He also featured in the Challenge Cup in Round 4 (Workington Town). He scored against Hunslet Hawks (4 tries), Batley Bulldogs (2 tries), Workington Town (4 tries), Halifax (1 try), Sheffield Eagles (3 tries), Whitehaven (2 tries), London Broncos (1 try), Doncaster (4 tries), Salford Red Devils (1 try), Leigh Centurions (2 tries) and Wakefield Trinity Wildcats (1 try).

2016 - 2016 Season

Williams featured in the pre-season friendly against Leeds Rhinos.

He featured in Round 11 (Workington Town) to Round 16 (Dewsbury Rams) then in Round 18 (Batley Bulldogs). Williams played in the Championship Shield Game 1 (Whitehaven) to Game 5 (Swinton Lions) then in Game 7 (Sheffield Eagles) to the Final (Sheffield Eagles). He scored against Workington Town (2 tries), Sheffield Eagles (1 try), Leigh Centurions (1 try), Whitehaven (1 try), Halifax (1 try), Oldham (1 try) and Dewsbury Rams (3 tries).

== Statistics ==
Statistics do not include pre-season friendlies.

| Season | Appearance | Tries | Goals | F/G | Points |
|---|---|---|---|---|---|
| 2014 Bradford Bulls | 7 | 2 | 0 | 0 | 8 |
| 2015 Bradford Bulls | 26 | 25 | 0 | 0 | 100 |
| 2016 Bradford Bulls | 15 | 10 | 0 | 0 | 40 |
| Total | 48 | 37 | 0 | 0 | 148 |
