= Etu Uaisele =

Former Tonga international rugby league footballer

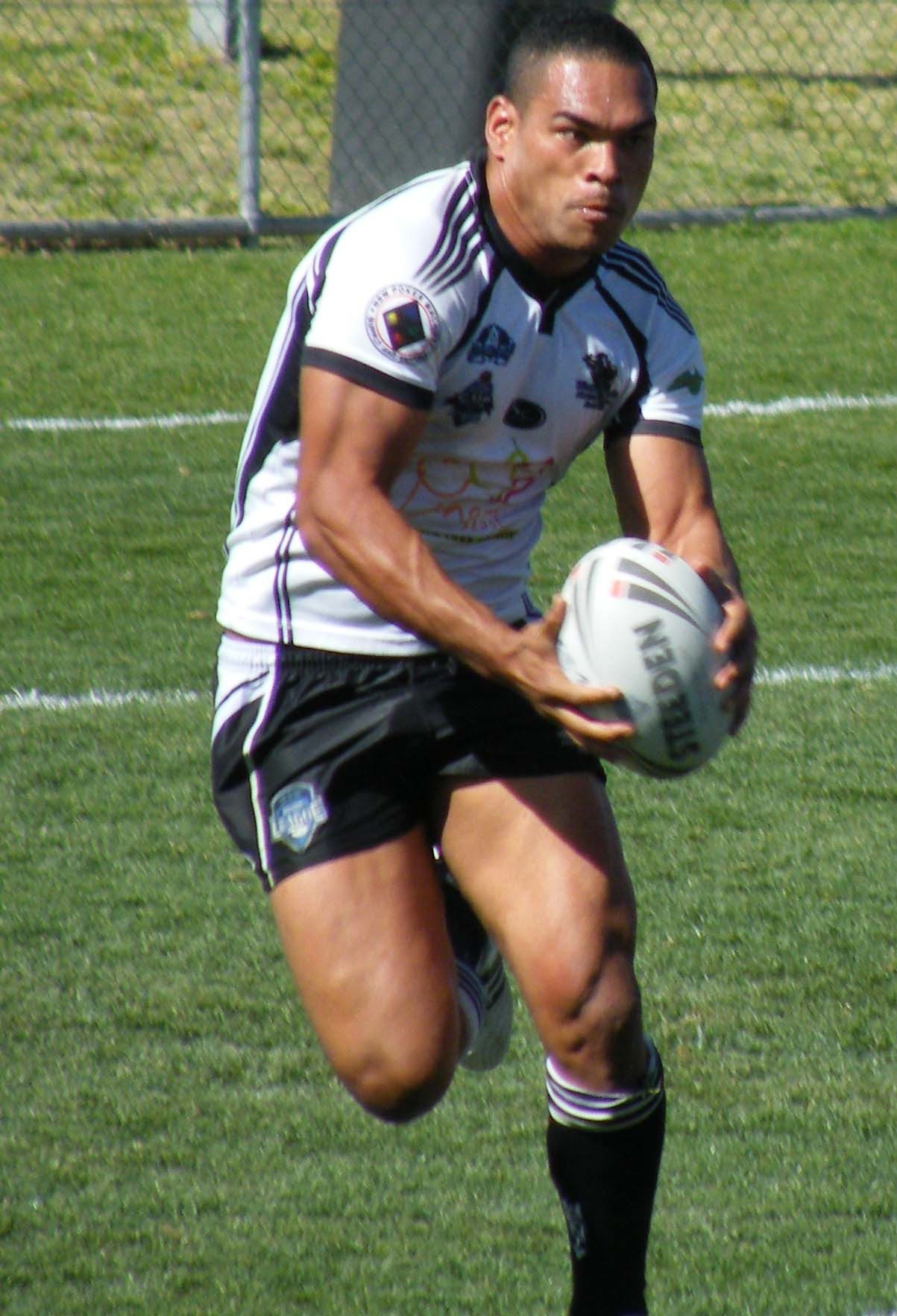

Personal information
- Full name: Etuate Uaisele
- Born: 8 December 1984 (age 41) Matahau, Tonga
- Height: 1.81 m (5 ft 11 in)
- Weight: 94 kg (14 st 11 lb)

Playing information
- Position: Wing, Centre, Fullback
Club
Years	Team	Pld	T	G	FG	P
2009–11	Parramatta Eels	16	3	0	0	12
2012	Penrith Panthers	14	5	0	0	20
2014	Featherstone Rovers	10	7	0	0	28
2014(Loan)	→ Sheffield Eagles	8	8	0	0	32
2015–16	Bradford Bulls	18	10	0	0	40
2015(Loan)	→ Dewsbury Rams	6	5	0	0	20
2016(Loan)	→ Dewsbury Rams	16	7	0	0	28
	Total	88	45	0	0	180
Representative
Years	Team	Pld	T	G	FG	P
2006–13	Tonga	9	5	0	0	20
- Source: As of 3 April 2016

Etuate Uaisele (born 12 December 1984) is a Tongan rugby league footballer who last played for the Dewsbury Rams in the Kingstone Press Championship. He plays as a winger or centre.

== Biography ==
=== Early life ===
Etu, short for Etuate was born in Tonga an island nation in the South Pacific. He later migrated to New Zealand in 1996 where he first started his rugby career. Growing up in South Auckland, Uaisele attended Ferguson Intermediate in Otara, he later joined Otahuhu College where he became one of the most talented students of the school. Uaisele played for the Otahuhu Leopards and represented Auckland and Counties Manukau in the regional under 16, under 17 and under 18 tournament.

== Playing career ==
In 2006, Uaisele was one of the players that won the 2006 Premier League Competition for Parramatta. For the next two years, Uaisele played well in the Premier League division. However, the Parramatta Eels first grade side included international and State of Origin capped players such as Jarryd Hayne, Krisnan Inu and Eric Grothe, Jr. at his preferred positions of wing and centre, so he was not called up until Grothe was injured in early in 2009.

Uaisele made his first grade NRL début for the Parramatta Eels on 24 April 2009, scoring a try despite a 40-8 loss. At the end of the 2011 NRL season, he moved to the Penrith Panthers on a one-year contract. Uaisele scored his first hat trick for the Penrith Panthers against his former club, the Parramatta Eels, during their match in round 4, 2012.

Uaisele was not re-signed by Penrith for the 2013 NRL season. Uaisele returned to the second tier competition, the NSW Cup, in 2013, with the Wyong Roos.

Uaisele joined Featherstone Rovers for the 2014 season in the English Championship.

2015 - 2015 Season

Uaisele signed for Bradford on a two-year Deal. He featured in the pre-season friendly against Castleford Tigers.

He featured in round 1 (Leigh Centurions) to round 3 (Featherstone Rovers). Uaisele featured in round 8 (Dewsbury Rams) to Round 17 (Dewsbury Rams) then in round 20 (Hunslet Hawks) to round 21 (Sheffield Eagles). He also featured in the Challenge Cup in round 4 (Workington Town) and Round 5 (Hull Kingston Rovers). He scored against Leigh Centurions (1 try), Dewsbury Rams (1 try), London Broncos (2 tries), Doncaster (3 tries), Sheffield Eagles (1 try) and Hunslet Hawks (1 try).

Midway through 2015 he signed on loan for the Dewsbury Rams until the end of the season.

2016 - 2016 Season

Uaisele did not feature in any pre-season friendlies.

Uaisele featured in round 8 (Halifax). Uaisele played in the Challenge Cup in the 4th Round (Dewsbury Rams). He scored against Halifax (1 try).

It was announced that Uaisele was released from Bradford towards the end of the season.

== Statistics ==
Statistics do not include pre-season friendlies.

Season	Appearance	Tries	Goals	F/G	Points
2015 Bradford Bulls	16	9	0	0	36
2016 Bradford Bulls	2	1	0	0	4
Total	18	10	0	0	40

== Representative ==
From 2006 to 2013, Uaisele appeared on several occasions for Tonga. He first played for Tonga in the Federation Shield competition. The next year, Uaisele was again capped for the national team.

In August 2008, Uaisele was named in the Tonga training squad for the 2008 Rugby League World Cup, and in October 2008 he was named in the final 24-man Tonga squad. He played all three games for Tonga in the World Cup, scoring three tries.

On 20 April 2013, Uaisele played for Tonga in the Pacific Rugby League International against fierce rivals Samoa at Penrith Stadium. Uaisele scored 1 try in the Tongans 36-4 demolishing of the Samoan team.
