= Jay Pitts =

English rugby league footballer (born 1989)

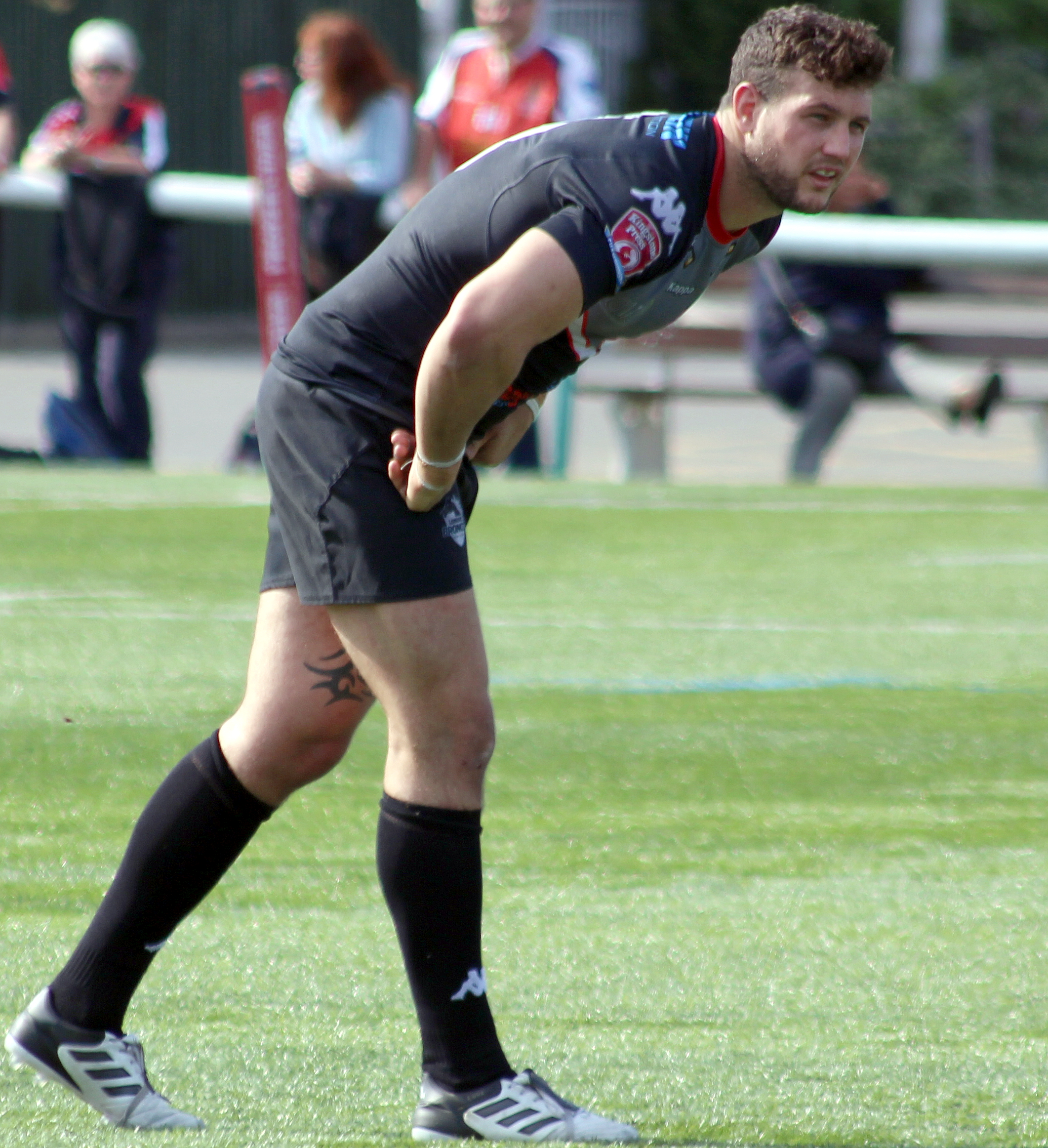

Personal information
- Full name: Jay Simon Pitts
- Born: 9 December 1989 (age 36) Ossett, West Yorkshire, England

Playing information
- Height: 6 ft 1 in (1.85 m)
- Weight: 14 st 11 lb (94 kg)
- Position: Second-row, Loose forward
Club
| Years | Team | Pld | T | G | FG | P |
|---|---|---|---|---|---|---|
| 2008–09 | Wakefield Trinity Wildcats | 22 | 2 | 0 | 0 | 8 |
| 2009–12 | Leeds Rhinos | 27 | 3 | 0 | 0 | 12 |
| 2012–14 | Hull F.C. | 53 | 3 | 0 | 0 | 12 |
| 2014(DR) | → Doncaster | 4 | 1 | 0 | 0 | 4 |
| 2014–16 | Bradford Bulls | 83 | 28 | 0 | 0 | 112 |
| 2017–19 | London Broncos | 92 | 26 | 0 | 0 | 104 |
| 2020–26 | Wakefield Trinity | 169 | 26 | 0 | 0 | 104 |
| | Total | 450 | 89 | 0 | 0 | 356 |

Jay Pitts (born 9 December 1989) is an English former rugby league footballer who last played as a second-row or loose forward for Wakefield Trinity in the Super League.

He previously played for the Wakefield Trinity Wildcats, Leeds Rhinos, Hull FC and the Bradford Bulls in the Super League, and the London Broncos in the Championship and the top flight.

== Background ==
Pitts was born in Ossett, West Yorkshire, England.

== Playing career ==
He has also played at club level for the Bradford Bulls, Wakefield Trinity Wildcats, Leeds Rhinos and Hull F.C.

Pitts signed a contract with Leeds beginning at the end of the 2009 season.

In March 2012, Pitts signed a 2 1/2-year deal with Hull F.C. after they negotiated a deal with Leeds.

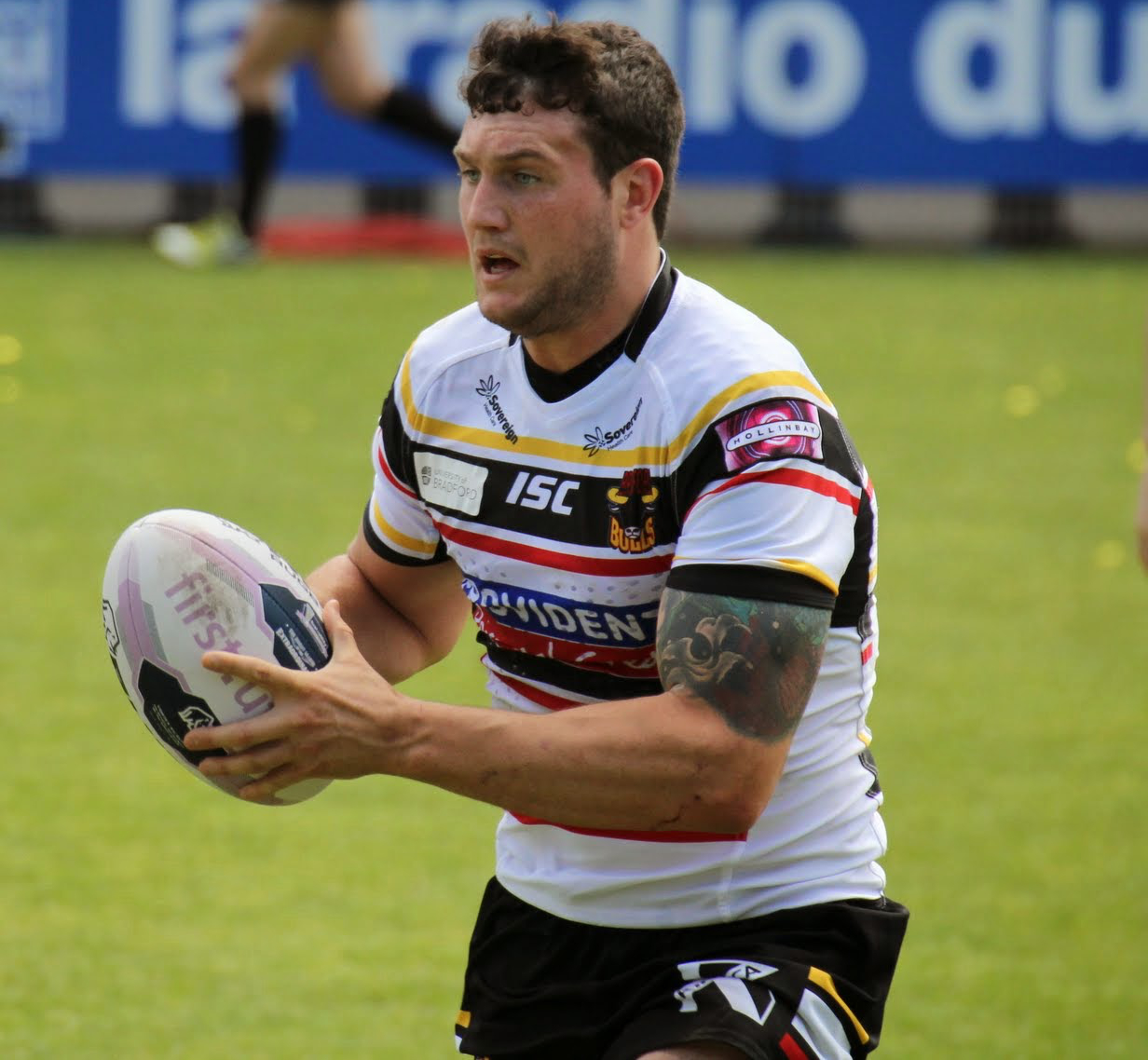
Pitts playing for the Bradford Bulls

== Bradford Bulls ==
2014 - 2014 Season

Pitts featured in round 11 against Warrington to round 15 Wakefield Trinity Wildcats. Pitts then played in round 17 against Hull Kingston Rovers to round 27 London Broncos. In the Challenge Cup he featured in round 5 Catalans Dragons to the Quarter Final against Warrington.

2015 - 2015 Season

Pitts signed for Bradford on a permanent basis on a two-year deal. He featured in the pre-season friendlies against Castleford and Leeds.

He featured in round 1 Leigh Centurions to round 23 Halifax. Pitts played in Qualifier 1 Sheffield to Qualifier 7 Halifax R.L.F.C. Pitts played in the £1 Million Game against Wakefield Trinity. He also featured in the Challenge Cup in round 4 Workington Town to round 5 Hull Kingston Rovers.

2016 - 2016 Season

Pitts featured in the pre-season friendlies against Leeds and Castleford.

He featured in round 1 Featherstone Rovers to round 21 rWhitehavenr then in round 23 against Featherstone. Pitts played in the Championship Shield Game 1 against Whitehaven to the final against Sheffield. Pitts played in the Challenge Cup in the 4th round against Dewsbury.

== London Broncos ==
Pitts signed a two-year deal with London following Bradford's liquidation.

2017 - 2017 Season

Pitts featured in round 1 Swinton to round 7 Rochdale. He also played in the Challenge Cup in round 4 against the Toronto Wolfpack.

== Wakefield Trinity ==
In 2020, Pitts joined Wakefield Trinity from the London Broncos. Pitts played 27 games for Wakefield Trinity in the Super League XXVIII season as the club finished bottom of the table and were relegated to the RFL Championship which ended their 24-year stay in the top flight. On 3 October 2026, he played in Wakefield Trinity's 2026 Super League Grand Final victory over Warrington.

== Statistics ==
Statistics do not include pre-season friendlies.

| Season | Appearance | Tries | Goals | F/G | Points |
|---|---|---|---|---|---|
| 2014 Bradford Bulls | 18 | 3 | 0 | 0 | 12 |
| 2015 Bradford Bulls | 33 | 11 | 0 | 0 | 44 |
| 2016 Bradford Bulls | 32 | 14 | 0 | 0 | 56 |
| Total | 83 | 28 | 0 | 0 | 112 |
