= James Mendeika =

Ireland international rugby league footballer

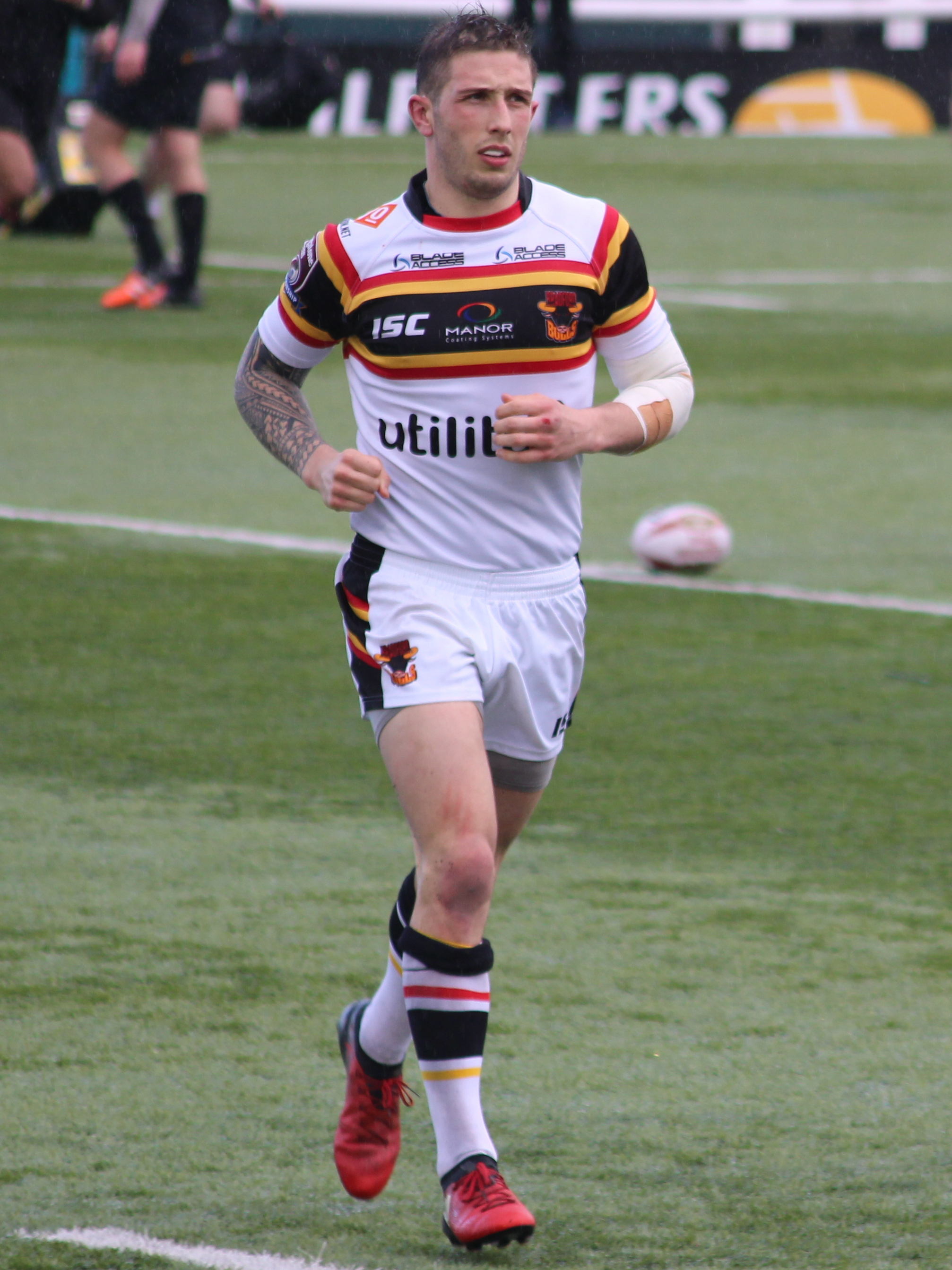

Personal information
- Born: 16 December 1991 (age 34) Bury, Greater Manchester, England
- Height: 6 ft 0 in (1.83 m)
- Weight: 14 st 2 lb (90 kg)

Playing information
- Position: Centre
Club
Years	Team	Pld	T	G	FG	P
2012–13	Warrington Wolves	0	0	0	0	0
2012(DR)	→ Leigh Centurions	2	1	0	0	4
2013(DR)	→ Swinton Lions	17	11	0	0	44
2013(loan)	→ London Broncos	6	2	0	0	8
2014–15	Featherstone Rovers	22	21	0	0	84
2015–17	Bradford Bulls	32	9	0	0	36
	Total	79	44	0	0	176
Representative
Years	Team	Pld	T	G	FG	P
2012–15	Ireland	8	0	0	0	0
- Source: As of 17 September 2017

James Mendeika (born 16 December 1991) is an Ireland international rugby league footballer who lasted played for the Bradford Bulls in the Kingstone Press Championship. He plays as a centre or fullback.

== Background ==
He was born in Bury, Greater Manchester, England.

== Club career ==
=== Warrington Wolves ===
James was previously signed at the Super League side the Warrington Wolves.

=== Leigh Centurions ===
Mendeika played for Leigh on loan in 2012.

=== Swinton Lions ===
In 2013, Mendeika played for Swinton Lions as a dual registered player.

He finished the season as Swinton's leading try scorer.

=== London Broncos ===
He also had a brief spell on loan at London Broncos.

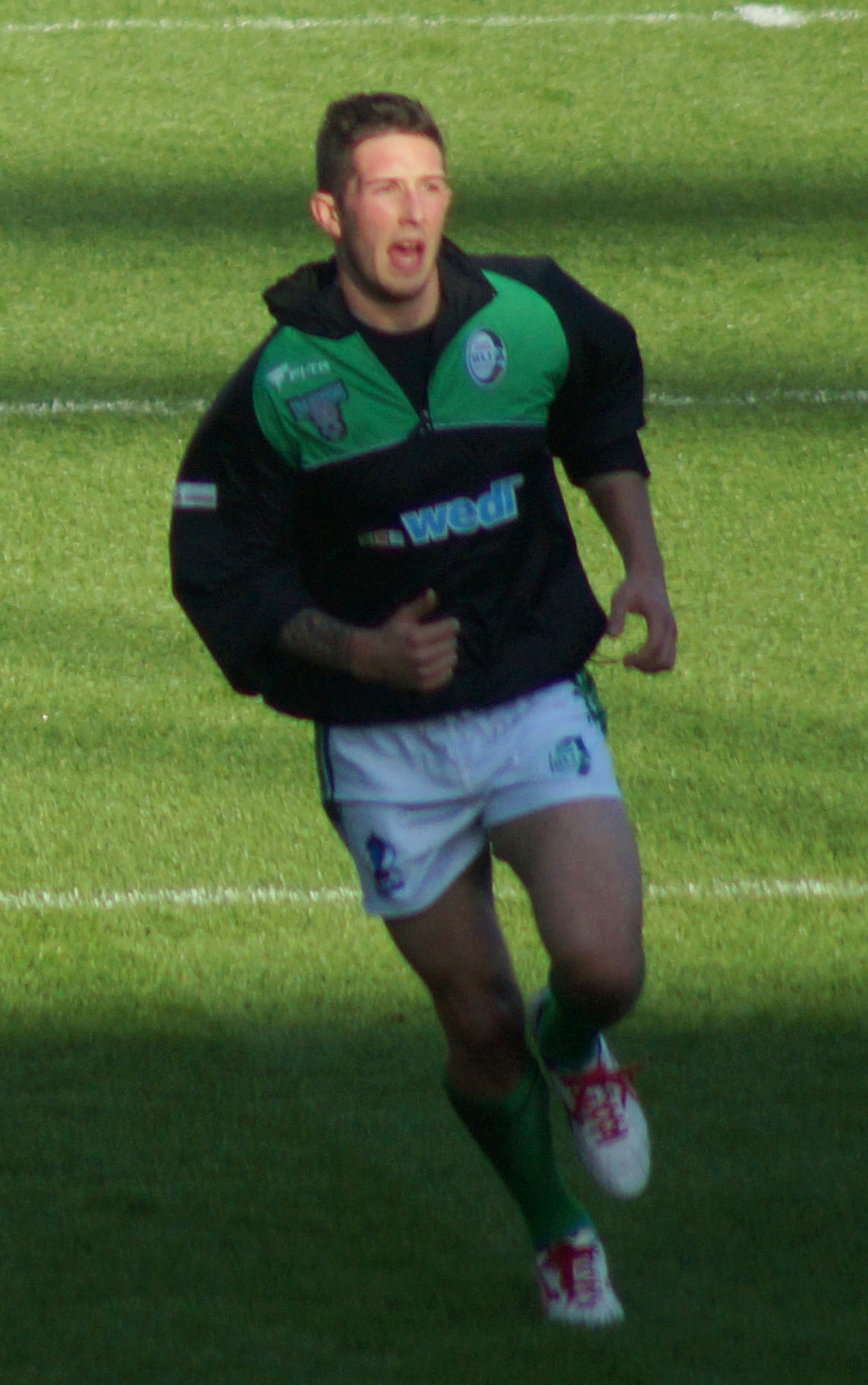
Mendeika representing Ireland

=== Featherstone Rovers ===
Mendeika played for Featherstone Rovers between 2014 and 2015.

=== Bradford Bulls ===
Mendeika signed for Championship side Bradford on a two-year deal in the middle of the 2015 season.

2015 - 2015 Season

Mendeika featured in the round 14 match against Halifax and then the return fixture against the same opponent in round 23. He played in Qualifier 5 against Hull Kingston Rovers then in Qualifier 7 against Halifax.

2016 - 2016 Season

Mendeika did not feature in any of the pre-season friendlies. Mendeika did not feature in any games throughout the season due to injuries and being loaned out.

2017 - 2017 Season

Mendeika re-signed with the Bradford outfit following the clubs liquidation at the end of the 2016 season. He featured in the pre-season friendlies against Huddersfield and Keighley. Mendeika featured in Round 1 against Hull Kingston Rovers to Round 6 against Batley. He was injured for Rounds 7-11 but then featured in Round 12 Toulouse Olympique to Round 13 against Sheffield then again in Round 17 Featherstone to Round 22 against Batley. He played in the Championship Shield Game 1 against Toulouse Olympique to Game 4 against Batley. Mendeika also played in the 2017 Challenge Cup in Round 4 match against Featherstone. He was released by the Bradford club at the end of the season.

Season	Appearance	Tries	Goals	F/G	Points
2015 Bradford Bulls	13	7	0	0	28
2016 Bradford Bulls	0	0	0	0	0
2017 Bradford Bulls	19	2	0	0	8
Total	32	9	0	0	36

== International career ==
Mendeika is an Ireland international, and made his début against England Knights in 2012. He was selected in the country's 2013 Rugby League World Cup squad.
