= Lucas Walshaw =

English rugby league footballer

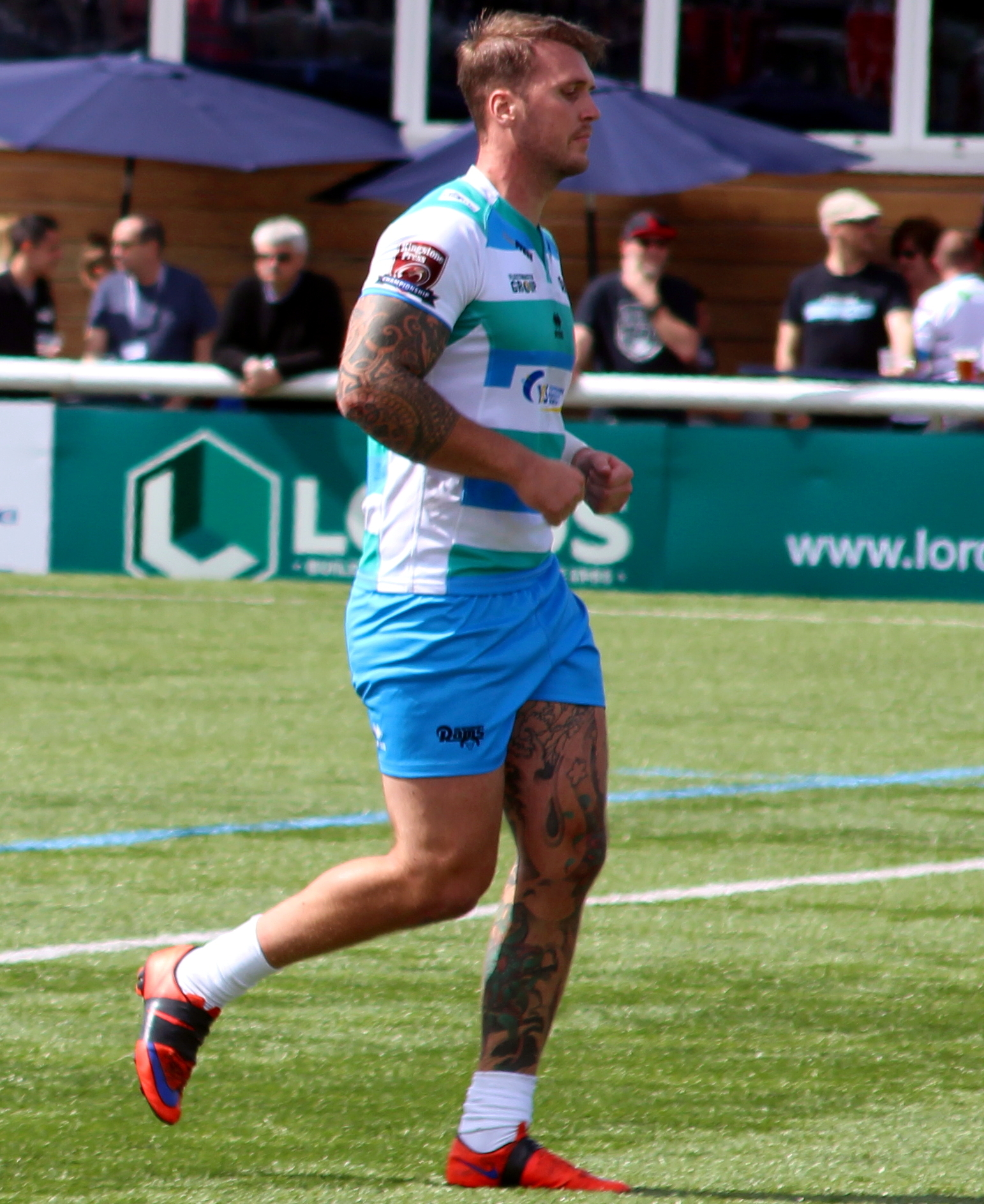

Personal information
- Born: 4 August 1992 (age 34) Dewsbury, West Yorkshire, England
- Height: 6 ft 6 in (198 cm)
- Weight: 17 st 9 lb (112 kg)

Playing information
- Position: Second-row, Centre
Club
Years	Team	Pld	T	G	FG	P
2011–14	Wakefield Trinity Wildcats	25	5	0	0	8
2012(loan)	→ Doncaster	6	3	0	0	12
2013(loan)	→ Dewsbury Rams	18	6	0	0	24
2014(loan)	→ Dewsbury Rams	4	0	0	0	0
2015–16	Bradford Bulls	14	1	0	0	4
2015(loan)	→ Dewsbury Rams	2	0	0	0	0
2016(loan)	→ Dewsbury Rams	10	6	0	0	24
2017–19	Dewsbury Rams	84	17	0	0	68
2020–26	Batley Bulldogs	141	42	0	0	168
	Total	304	80	0	0	308
- Source: As of 12 September 2026

Lucas Walshaw (born 4 August 1992) is an English former professional rugby league footballer who played as a centre or second-row for the Batley Bulldogs in the Betfred Championship.

He previously played for the Wakefield Trinity Wildcats in the Super League, and spent time on loan from the Wakefield Trinity Wildcats at Doncaster in 2012 Championship 1, and the Dewsbury Rams in the Championship. Walshaw also played for the Bradford Bulls in the Championship, and spent time on loan from Bradford Bulls at Dewsbury Rams in the second tier. He later joined the Dewsbury Rams on a permanent deal.

== Bradford Bulls ==
=== 2015 ===
Walshaw signed for Bradford on a 2-year deal. He featured in the pre-season friendlies against the Castleford Tigers and Leeds Rhinos.

He featured between round 1 (Leigh Centurions) and round 5 (Batley Bulldogs) then in round 8 (Dewsbury Rams). He played in round 21 (Sheffield Eagles), round 22 and round 23 (Halifax). He also featured in the Challenge Cup in round 4 (Workington Town) and round 5 (Hull Kingston Rovers). He scored a try against Hull Kingston Rovers.

=== 2016 ===
Walshaw featured in the pre-season friendlies against Leeds Rhinos and Castleford Tigers.

He featured in round 5 (Oldham) and round 16 (Dewsbury Rams). Walshaw also played in round 18 (Batley Bulldogs).

== Dewsbury Rams ==
Walshaw signed with Dewsbury Rams in September 2016.

== Batley Bulldogs ==
=== 2026 ===
He played his last game in the 25-18 defeat to Sheffield Eagles in the play-offs on 6 September 2026.

== Statistics ==
Statistics do not include pre-season friendlies.

Season	Appearance	Tries	Goals	F/G	Points
2015 Bradford Bulls	11	1	0	0	4
2016 Bradford Bulls	3	0	0	0	0
Total	14	1	0	0	4
