= Jake Mullaney =

Australian rugby league footballer

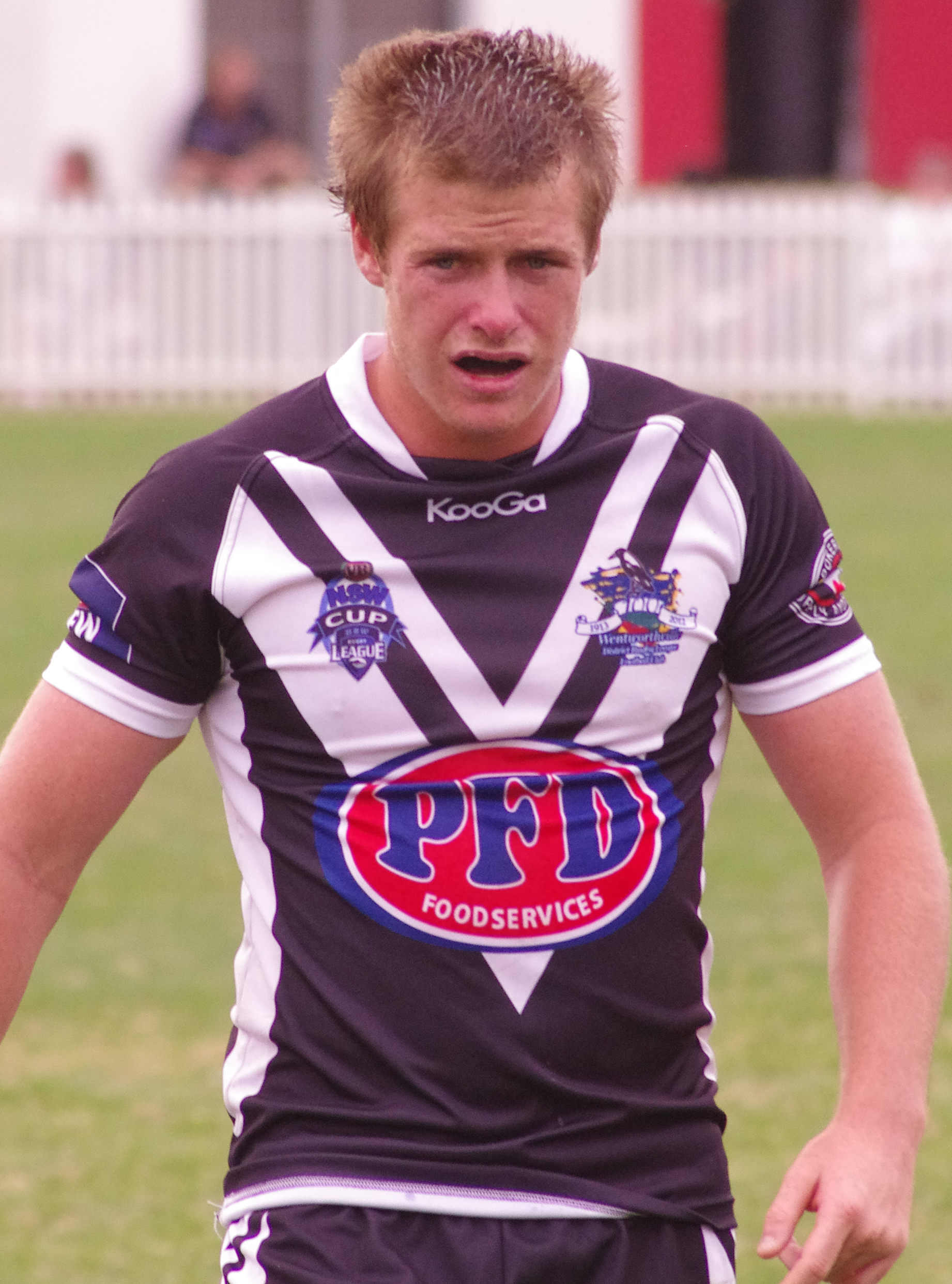
- Mullaney playing for Wentworthville Magpies in 2012

Personal information
- Born: 28 May 1990 (age 36) Sydney, New South Wales, Australia
- Height: 173 cm (5 ft 8 in)
- Weight: 80 kg (12 st 8 lb)

Playing information
- Position: Fullback, Five-eighth, Wing
Club
Years	Team	Pld	T	G	FG	P
2012–13	Parramatta Eels	18	5	6	0	32
2014	Salford Red Devils	13	2	30	0	68
2015	Bradford Bulls	17	17	0	1	69
	Total	48	24	36	1	169
Representative
Years	Team	Pld	T	G	FG	P
2011	NSW Residents	1	1	0	0	4
- Source: RLP As of 9 January 2024

Jake Mullaney (born 28 May 1990) is an Australian former professional rugby league footballer who played in the 2010s and 2020s. He played for English club Bradford Bulls, as a fullback, five-eighth or halfback. He has been described as, "slightly built," and a, "prolific goal-kicker."

== Early life ==
Mullaney grew up playing for Eaglevale St Andrews in NSW. In 2009, when he got the call-up to play in the Wests Tigers under-20s side.

== Club career ==
=== Wests Tigers (2009–11) ===
Mullaney made records in the Toyota Cup, scoring a then record 325 points in a season. In his first season (2009) he scored the most tries with 29 and the second most goals with 103. Despite his achievements, he was not offered a contract renewal from the Wests Tigers, with club favouring James Tedesco. Still, Mullaney was described as, "the best fullback to come out of Western Suburbs since Brett Hodgson." In late 2011, the Parramatta Eels announced that Mullaney would be playing for them until 2013.

=== Parramatta Eels (2012–13) ===
On 8 July 2012, Rd 18, Mullaney made his NRL début for the Parramatta Eels against the Manly-Warringah Sea Eagles at Brookvale Oval. Scoring a try on début in Parramatta's 40-24 loss. Mullaney spent two years at Parramatta with both seasons ending with the club finishing last and claiming the wooden spoon.

=== Bradford Bulls (2015) ===
Mullaney signed for Bradford on a one-year deal. He featured in the pre-season friendlies against Castleford and Leeds.

Mullaney featured in round 1 Leigh to round 6 Workington Town then in round 11 Sheffield. Mullaney played in round 17 against Dewsbury to round 18 against Workington, then in round 20 against Hunslet R.L.F.C. to round 21 Sheffield. Mullaney played in Qualifier 1 Sheffield and then in Qualifier 3 against Salford to Qualifier 4 Widnes. He featured in Qualifier 6 against Leigh. He played in the £1 Million Game against the Wakefield Trinity Wildcats. He also featured in the Challenge Cup in Round 4 Workington Town.

He signed a two-year extension with Bradford on 12 August 2015. However, he was granted a release from the club to allow him to return to Australia for family reasons

=== Thirlmere Roosters ===
Mullaney captain-coached the Thirlmere Roosters to Group 6 Rugby League First Grade premierships in 2019 and 2020.

== Career statistics ==
Season	Appearance	Tries	Goals	F/G	Points
2015 Bradford Bulls	17	17	0	1	69
Total	17	17	0	1	69
