= Jean-Philippe Baile =

France international rugby league footballer

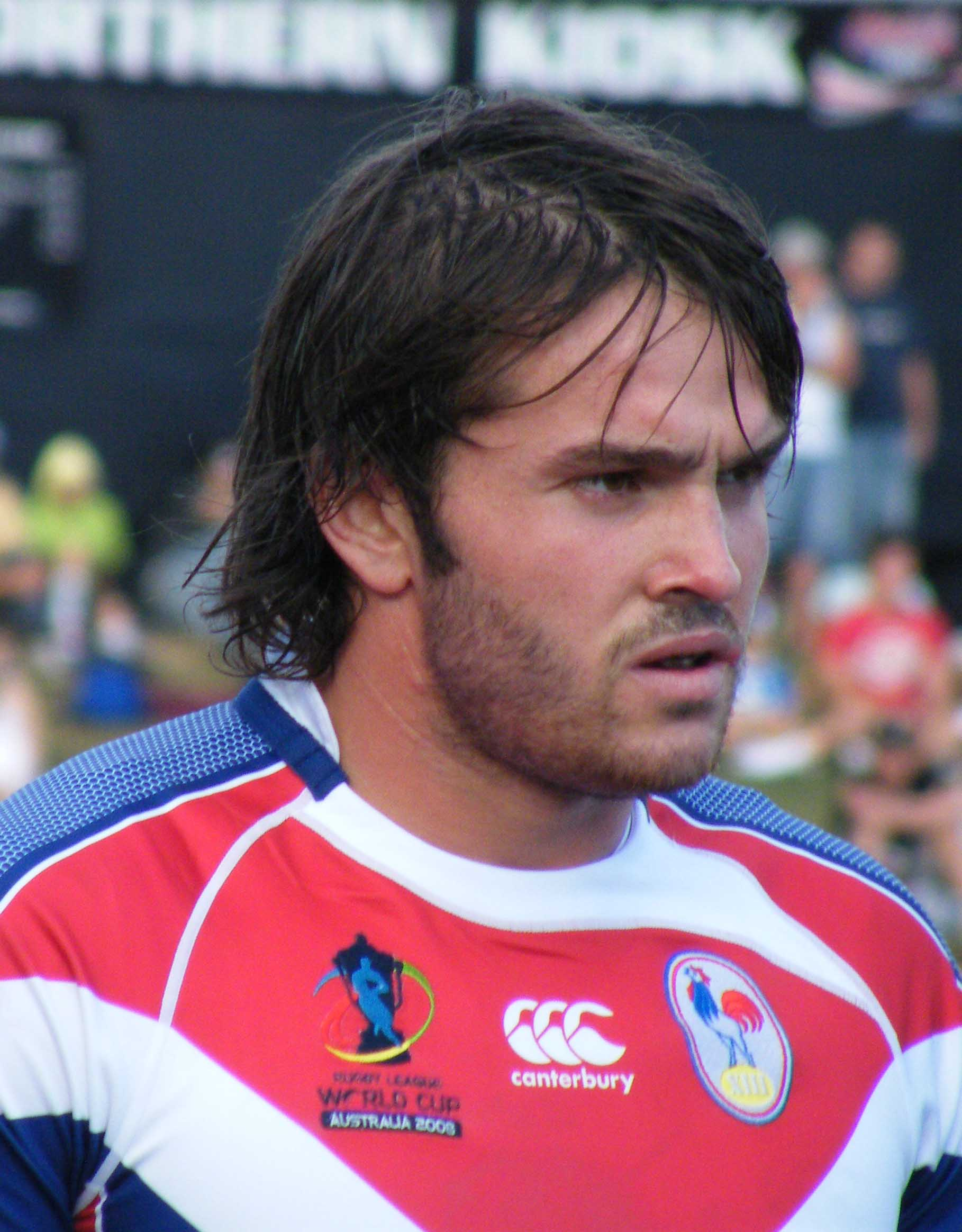

Personal information
- Born: 7 June 1987 (age 39) Carcassonne, Languedoc-Roussillon, France
- Height: 1.81 m (5 ft 11 in)
- Weight: 93 kg (14 st 9 lb)

Playing information
- Position: Second-row, Centre
Club
Years	Team	Pld	T	G	FG	P
2008–14	Catalans Dragons	86	30	0	0	88
2015–16	Bradford Bulls	14	1	0	0	4
2016–	AS Carcassonne	41	12	0	0	48
	Total	141	43	0	0	140
Representative
Years	Team	Pld	T	G	FG	P
2008–15	France	22	7	0	0	16
- Source: As of 29 June 2019

Jean-Philippe Baile (born 7 June 1987) is a French professional rugby league footballer who plays for AS Carcassonne.

Baile's position of choice is as a centre.

== France ==
He was part of the France squad for the 2008 Rugby League World Cup.

In 2010 he represented France again in the Alitalia European Cup, and he also played in the 2013 Rugby League World Cup, 2014 European Cup and 2015 European Cup. He also played for France in their 2015 European Cup mid-tournament test-match against England. He was a part what was considered a 'weakened' French side due to injury and it showed with an appalling showing against their opponents.

== Bradford Bulls ==
2015 – 2015 Season

Baile signed for Bradford on a one-year deal. He featured in the pre-season friendly against Castleford.

He featured in Round 2 against Whitehaven to Round 4 Hunslet Hawks then in Round 6 Workington Town to Round 7 Halifax. He featured in Round 10 Doncaster then in Round 12 Whitehaven R.L.F.C. to Round 16 Doncaster R.L.F.C. He featured in Qualifier 7 Halifax R.L.F.C. He played in the £1 Million Game against the Wakefield Trinity Wildcats. Baile also played in the Challenge Cup in Round 5 against Hull Kingston Rovers.

2016 – 2016 Season

Baile did not feature in any of the pre-season friendlies. He played in Round 8 Halifax R.L.F.C. Baile left the club halfway through the season.

== Statistics ==
Statistics do not include pre-season friendlies.

Season	Appearance	Tries	Goals	F/G	Points
2015 Bradford Bulls	13	1	0	0	4
2016 Bradford Bulls	1	0	0	0	0
Total	14	1	0	0	4
