= Epalahame Lauaki =

Tongan-New Zealand rugby league footballer

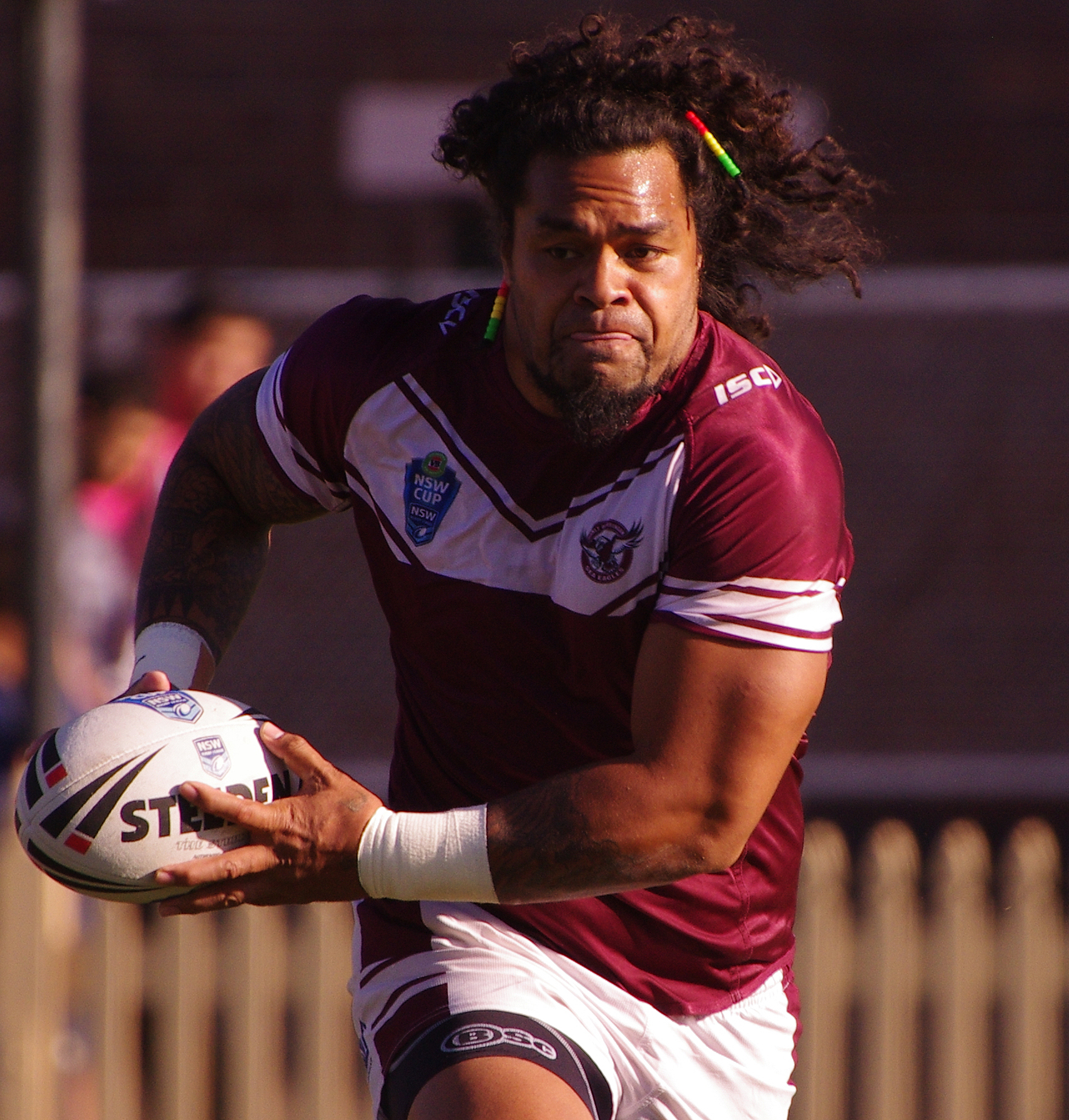

Personal information
- Full name: Epalahame Vealoloko Lauaki
- Born: 27 January 1984 (age 42) Ha'apai, Tonga

Playing information
- Height: 184 cm (6 ft 0 in)
- Weight: 109 kg (17 st 2 lb)
- Position: Second-row, Lock, Prop
Club
Years	Team	Pld	T	G	FG	P
2004–08	New Zealand Warriors	69	10	0	0	40
2009–11	Hull F.C.	56	5	0	0	20
2012–14	Wigan Warriors	35	2	0	0	8
2015–16	Bradford Bulls	33	2	0	0	8
	Total	193	19	0	0	76
Representative
Years	Team	Pld	T	G	FG	P
2007	New Zealand	2	0	0	0	0
2008–10	Tonga	4	0	0	0	0
2012–13	Exiles	2	0	0	0	0
- Education: Waitakere College; Kelston Boys High School
- Spouse: Renee Halapua
- Relatives: Sione Lauaki (brother); Tevita Vaikona (cousin)

Epalahame "Hame" Lauaki (born 27 January 1984) is a former professional rugby league footballer who last played for the Bradford Bulls in the Championship.

== Background ==
Lauaki was born in Ha'apai, Tonga.

He is the brother of former All Black Sione Lauaki. He is the cousin of rugby league and union star Tevita Vaikona.

== Early years ==
Lauaki was educated at Waitakere College and then at Kelston Boys High School and played for the Waitemata Seagulls and Glenora Bears in the Auckland Rugby League competition.

== New Zealand Warriors ==
He was signed by the New Zealand Warriors and made his first grade début on 14 March 2004 against Brisbane Broncos at Suncorp Stadium. During his Warriors career he was used mainly as an interchange player, starting only ten games in sixty nine appearances. When not selected for the first grade side, Lauaki played for the Waitakere Rangers in the Bartercard Cup and the Auckland Lions and Auckland Vulcans in the NSW Cup.

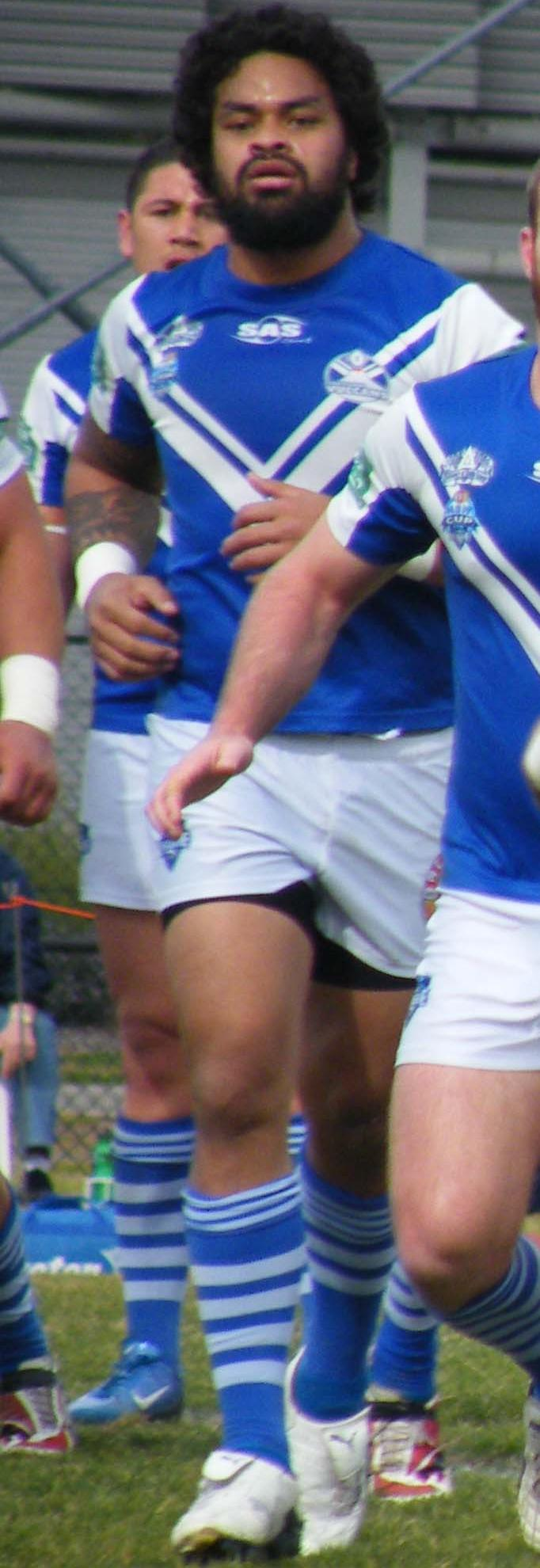
Lauaki playing for the Auckland Vulcans in 2008

In 2007 he signed a three-year extension with the Warriors, making him a Warrior until the end of the 2010 season.

== Hull ==
On 23 February 2009 it was announced that Lauaki had been released by the Warriors so he could sign a 3-year deal to play for Hull F.C. in the Super League.

He made his Super League début for Hull against Harlequins RL on 21 August 2009 and has since made himself a crowd favourite at the KC Stadium.

After arriving at the KC Stadium late in 2009, Lauaki made his intentions clear with a number of committed displays. The hard-working second-rower or prop forward provided physicality, along with good feet and offload. Those attributes were epitomised in 2010, with a hand off on Leon Pryce to score against St. Helens on the opening day of the season, before a similar try against Salford later that year as he held off four men to touch down.

== Wigan ==
Lauaki joined Wigan in 2012. He made 35 appearances for the club, scoring two tries, before being released in January 2014. He signed with the Manly Warringah Sea Eagles, but did not play a game and was released at the end of 2014.

== Bradford Bulls ==
2015 - 2015 Season

Lauaki signed for Bradford on a 2 Year Deal. He did not feature in any of the pre-season friendlies.

He featured in Round 3 (Featherstone Rovers) then in Round 5 (Batley Bulldogs) to Round 7 (Halifax). He played in Round 9 (London Broncos) then in Round 11 (Sheffield Eagles) to Round 18 (Workington Town). He played in Round 21 (Sheffield Eagles) to Round 23 (Halifax). Lauaki played in Qualifier 1 (Sheffield Eagles) to Qualifier 7 (Halifax). Epalahame played in the £1 Million Game against Wakefield Trinity Wildcats. He also featured in the Challenge Cup in Round 4 (Workington Town). He scored against Workington Town (1 try).

2016 - 2016 Season

Lauaki featured in the pre-season friendlies against Leeds Rhinos and Castleford Tigers.

He featured in Round 1 (Featherstone Rovers) then in Round 16 (Dewsbury Rams) to Round 18 (Batley Bulldogs). He played in Round 20 (Leigh Centurions) and then in Round 22 (Oldham R.L.F.C.). Lauaki played in the Championship Shield Game 1 (Whitehaven) then in Game 3 (Oldham R.L.F.C.) to Game 4 (Dewsbury Rams). He scored against Oldham R.L.F.C. (1 try).

== Statistics ==
Statistics do not include pre-season friendlies.

Season	Appearance	Tries	Goals	F/G	Points
2015 Bradford Bulls	24	1	0	0	4
2016 Bradford Bulls	9	1	0	0	4
Total	33	2	0	0	8

== Representative career ==
In 2006 Lauaki was named in the New Zealand 'A' team that played against an Australian Invitational side. In 2007 Lauaki was then named in the New Zealand national rugby league team squad for the tour of Great Britain. He played in two tests for the Kiwis and also played in the All Golds match.

Lauaki then decided to switch his international allegiance to the nation of his birth, Tonga. In August 2008, Lauaki was named in the Tongan training squad for the 2008 Rugby League World Cup, and in October 2008 he was named in the final 24-man Tonga squad. He played in three games at the tournament as well as a warm up game against the New Zealand national rugby league team.

== Personal life ==
Lauaki is the third eldest from a total of nine siblings. His parents Kepu and Mele Fale Lauaki both come from Tonga. His immediate family reside in Auckland, New Zealand.

Lauaki married Renee (née Halapua) from Hihifo, Tonga, whom he met in Auckland, New Zealand. They have two boys together, the eldest, Kepu Lauaki Jr, who is named after his father, and his second son, Mana'ia Lauaki who was born in 2011. Lauaki and his family resided in England until returning to New Zealand after Sione's passing in 2017.

Lauaki is good friends with fellow Hull F.C. and Tonga team mates Willie Manu and Sam Moa. The trio are commonly known by the Hull fans as 'The Tongan Mafia'.

In 2023, Lauaki participated in season 3 of Match Fit, where former rugby players return to play against the Australian counterparts. He joined in the first season that featured former rugby league stars. By the halfway point of the program, he revealed that he still struggles with Sione Lauaki's death in 2017 due to heart and kidney problems.
