= Adam Henry (rugby league) =

New Zealand rugby league footballer

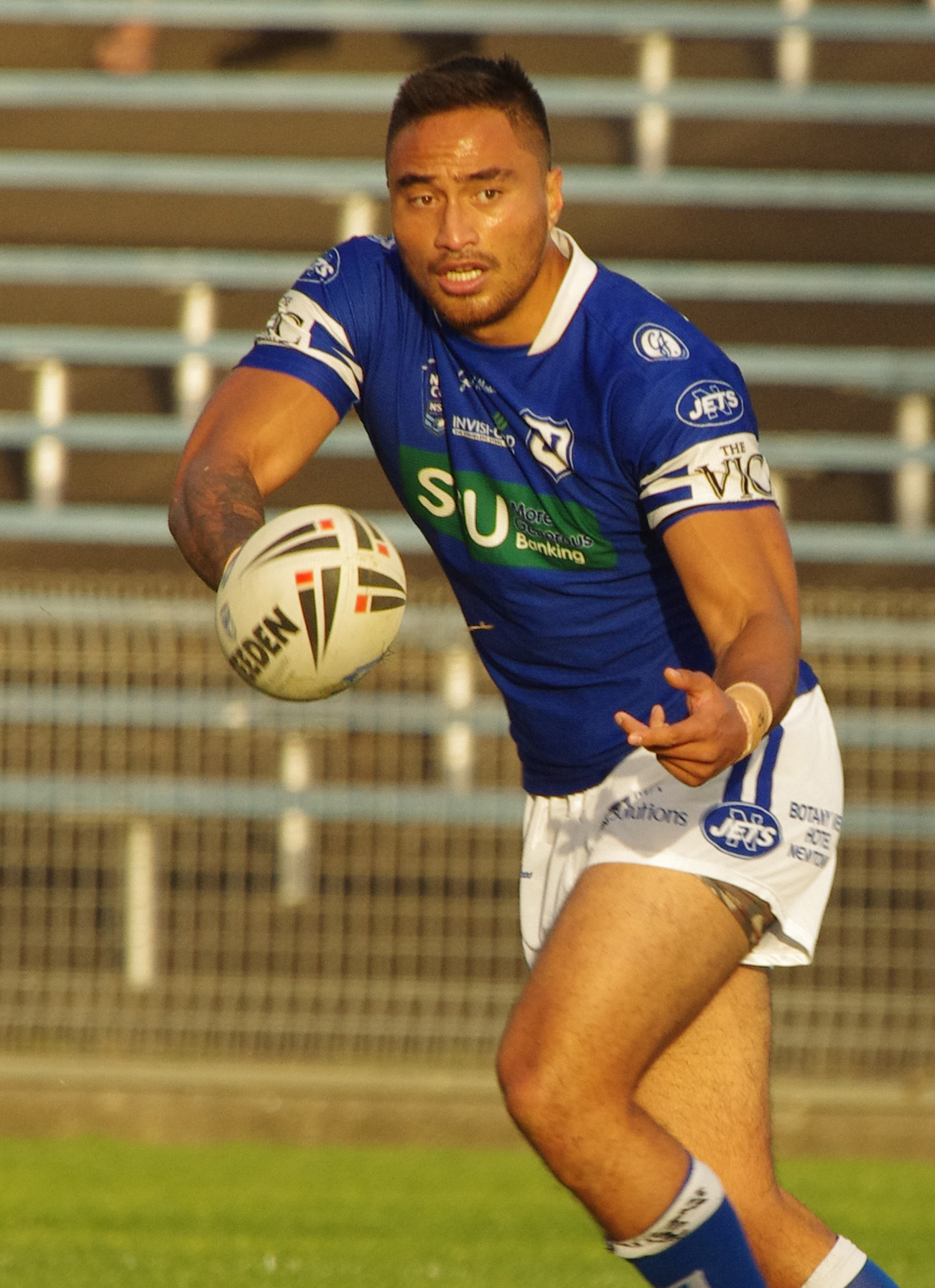

Personal information
- Born: 2 September 1991 (age 34) Auckland, New Zealand
- Height: 185 cm (6 ft 1 in)
- Weight: 101 kg (15 st 13 lb)

Playing information
- Position: Wing, Centre, Five-eighth
Club
Years	Team	Pld	T	G	FG	P
2012–13	Sydney Roosters	4	1	0	0	4
2014–15	Bradford Bulls	50	21	0	0	84
2016	Racing Club Albi	14	12	0	0	48
	Total	68	34	0	0	136
- Source: As of 31 October 2023

Adam Henry (born 2 September 1991) is a New Zealand former professional rugby league footballer who last played for Racing Club Albi in the Elite One Championship. He primarily played on the wing, but could also play at centre and five-eighth. He previously played for the Sydney Roosters and the Bradford Bulls.

== Early years ==
Henry attended Mount Albert Grammar School, which has produced several notable sporting personalities, including former Sydney Roosters teammate Sonny Bill Williams. He played on the New Zealand Warriors Unders 20's premiership winning team in 2011, scoring 21 tries in his maiden season and also represented the Junior Kiwis.

== Sydney Roosters ==
After moving to the Sydney Roosters, he made his NRL début in round 14 of the 2012 NRL season, playing on the wing in a losing effort to the Brisbane Broncos.

== Bradford Bulls ==
Henry signed with Super League side Bradford Bulls as a replacement for Keith Lulia.

=== 2014 ===
He featured in round 1 Castleford to round 14 Catalans Dragons, then in round 16 Salford and round 19 Catalans Dragons, to round 20 St Helens R.F.C.. Henry played in round 22 Wigan to round 27 London Broncos. Henry featured in round 4 Oldham R.L.F.C. to the Quarter Final Warrington in the Challenge Cup.

Henry re-signed for Bradford outfit for another year despite their relegation to the RFL Championship.

=== 2015 ===
He featured in round 4 Hunslet Hawks to round 13 Featherstone Rovers, then in round 21 Sheffield Eagles to Round 23 Halifax. Henry played in Qualifier 1 Sheffield, then in Qualifier 7 against Halifax. He also featured in the Challenge Cup in round 4 Workington Town to round 5 Hull Kingston Rovers.

At the end of the season, Henry left Bradford to return home. He later signed for the Central Queensland Capras in the Queensland Cup.

=== 2016 ===
Henry signed for Racing Club Albi XIII in the French Elite One Championship in August 2016.

== Statistics ==
Season	Appearances	Tries	Goals	F/G	Points
2014 Bradford Bulls	27	6	0	0	24
2015 Bradford Bulls	23	15	0	0	60
Total	50	21	0	0	84
