= Ryan Shaw (rugby league) =

English rugby footballer (born 1992)

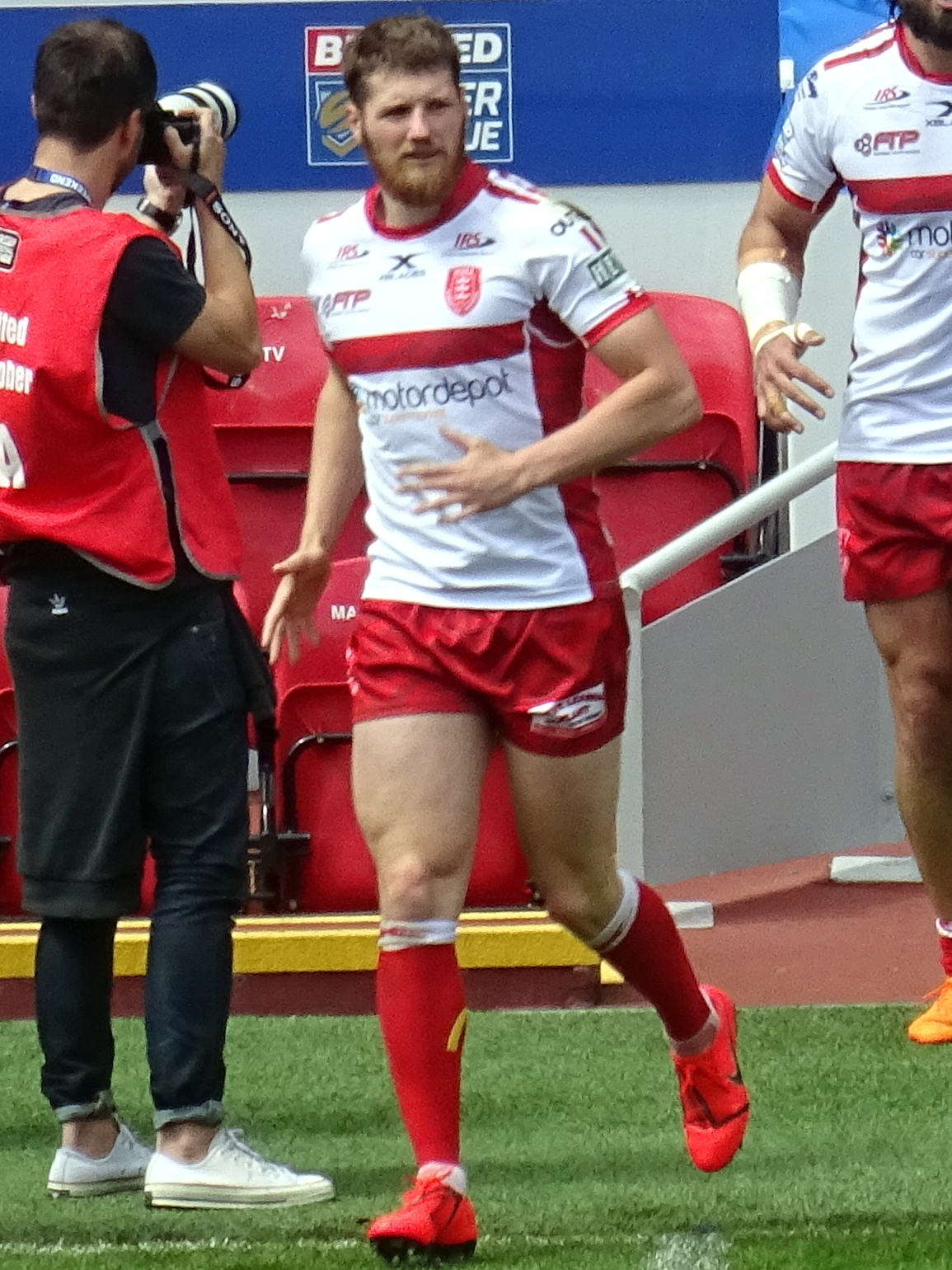

Personal information
- Full name: Ryan Shaw
- Born: 26 September 1992 (age 34) Barrow-in-Furness, England
- Height: 6 ft 0 in (1.83 m)
- Weight: 14 st 9 lb (93 kg)

Playing information

Rugby league
- Position: Wing, Fullback, Centre
Club
Years	Team	Pld	T	G	FG	P
2012–14	Warrington Wolves	0	0	0	0	0
2012(loan)	→ Castleford Tigers	0	0	0	0	0
2012(loan)	→ Leigh Centurions	3	3	1	0	14
2012(loan)	→ Barrow Raiders	12	8	58	0	148
2013(loan)	→ Swinton Lions	18	9	38	0	112
2013(loan)	→ London Broncos	2	1	2	0	8
2014(loan)	→ Barrow Raiders	26	10	60	0	160
2015	Bradford Bulls	25	16	111	0	286
2016–19	Hull Kingston Rovers	81	47	140	0	468
2020	Leigh Centurions	2	0	0	0	0
2021–25	Barrow Raiders	87	27	280	0	668
	Total	256	121	690	0	1864

Rugby union
Club
Years	Team	Pld	T	G	FG	P
2019–20	Leeds Tykes	15	1	10	0	26
- Source: As of 19 September 2025

Ryan Shaw (born 26 September 1992) is an English former professional rugby league footballer who last played wing, centre or fullback for the Barrow Raiders in Championship.

Shaw is a product of the Warrington Wolves academy, spending time on loan from Warrington at the Castleford Tigers and the London Broncos in the Super League, the Leigh Centurions and the Swinton Lions in the Co-operative Championship, Barrow in the Championship 1 and the Co-operative Championship. He played for the Bradford Bulls in the Championship, before signing for Hull Kingston Rovers in the top flight of English rugby league. He has also played for Leigh on a permanent basis in the Championship.

== Background ==
Shaw was born in Barrow-in-Furness, Cumbria, England.

== Career ==
Shaw started his career in the academy at Warrington. He had spells at Leigh and Barrow on dual-registration deals, but failed to make a first team appearance for Warrington. He was signed by Swinton for the 2013 season. He joined London Broncos on loan later that year, where he made his Super League début. He spent the 2014 season with hometown club, Barrow and rugby idol Mike Backhouse

=== Bradford Bulls ===
2015 - 2015 Season

Shaw signed for Bradford on a one-year deal. He featured in the pre-season friendlies against Castleford Tigers and Leeds. He scored against Castleford Tigers (1 try) and Leeds (1 try).

He featured in Round 2 (Whitehaven) to Round 23 (Halifax) then in Qualifier 7 (Halifax). He also featured in the Challenge Cup in Round 4 (Workington Town) to Round 5 (Hull Kingston Rovers). He scored against Featherstone Rovers (9 goals), Hunslet (4 tries, 16 goals), Batley (1 try, 8 goals), Workington Town (2 tries, 20 goals), Halifax (4 tries, 13 goals), Dewsbury Rams (1 try, 6 goals), London Broncos (1 try, 10 goals), Hull Kingston Rovers (5 goals), Doncaster (2 tries, 9 goals), Whitehaven (4 goals), Sheffield Eagles (1 try, 5 goals) and Leigh Centurions (6 goals).

=== Hull KR ===
Shaw left Bradford at the end of the 2015 season for Hull Kingston Rovers on the recommendation of former Great Britain prop Jamie Peacock.

=== Leeds Tykes ===
On 11 October 2019, it was reported that he had switched codes to rugby union and signed for Leeds Tykes in the RFU Championship.

=== Leigh Centurions ===
On 16 February 2020 it was reported that he had returned to rugby league and signed for Leigh in the RFL Championship.

=== Barrow Raiders ===
On 25 December 2020, it was reported that he had signed a two-year deal with Barrow in the RFL League 1.

== Statistics ==
Statistics do not include pre-season friendlies.

Season	Appearance	Tries	Goals	F/G	Points
2015 Bradford	25	16	111	0	286
2016 Hull Kingston Rovers	7	4	6	0	28
Total	32	20	117	0	314
