= Paul Clough =

English rugby league footballer

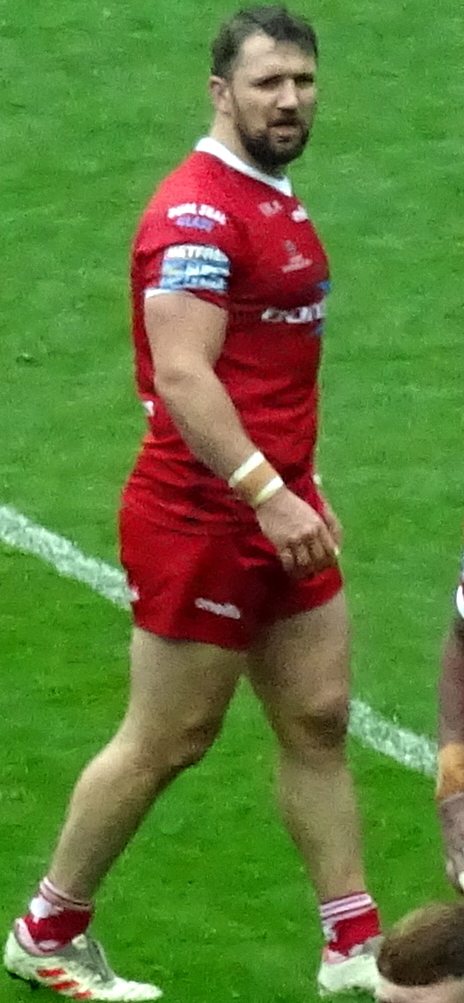

Personal information
- Born: 27 September 1987 (age 38) St Helens, Merseyside, England
- Height: 6 ft 0 in (1.83 m)
- Weight: 16 st 3 lb (103 kg)

Playing information
- Position: Prop, Second-row
Club
Years	Team	Pld	T	G	FG	P
2004–14	St. Helens	189	24	0	0	96
2013(loan)	→ Whitehaven	4	0	0	0	0
2014(loan)	→ Widnes Vikings	15	1	0	0	4
2015–16	Bradford Bulls	45	1	0	0	4
2017–20	Huddersfield Giants	82	3	0	0	12
2021	Widnes Vikings	19	0	0	0	0
	Total	354	29	0	0	116
Representative
Years	Team	Pld	T	G	FG	P
2011–12	England Knights	2	0	0	0	0
- Source: As of 15 December 2020
- Relatives: John Clough (brother)

Paul Clough (born 27 September 1987), also known by the nickname of "Cloughy", is an English professional rugby league footballer who plays as a prop or second-row forward for Widnes Vikings in the RFL Championship and the England Knights at international level.

He has previously played in the Super League for St Helens, and on loan from St Helens at the Widnes Vikings. Clough played for the Bradford Bulls in the Kingstone Press Championship.

== Background ==
He was born in St Helens, Merseyside, England. He is the younger brother of the rugby league footballer John Clough.

== St Helens ==
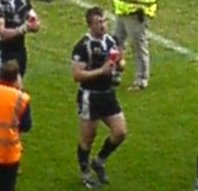
Clough playing for St Helens

In November 2006 Paul Clough was promoted to train full-time with the St Helens' first team squad. He had also been training with the squad in 2005's Super League X, but his performances saw him included in St Helens elite 25-man squad for the upcoming season. Clough was expected to compete for a regular first team spot over the next few years and was given the number 22 jersey for the 2007's Super League XII. Clough was a powerful second rower, a driving force in the tackle, and a player who was already physically imposing, especially considering his age. The backrower made his Super League début in July 2005 against Hull F.C.

Clough played in the 2008 Super League Grand Final defeat by the Leeds Rhinos. Clough was awarded the number 17 jersey for 2009's Super League XIV. Clough played in the 2009 Super League Grand Final defeat by Leeds at Old Trafford. Clough played in the 2011 Super League Grand Final defeat against Leeds at Old Trafford.

== Bradford Bulls ==
2015 - 2015 Season

Clough signed for the Bradford Bulls on a two-year deal. He featured in the pre-season friendlies against Castleford and Leeds. He featured in Round 1 against Leigh to Round 20 Hunslet R.L.F.C. then in Round 22 against Leigh to Round 23 Halifax. Clough played in Qualifier 1 against the Sheffield Eagles to Qualifier 7 Halifax R.L.F.C.|Halifax. Clough played in the £1 Million Game against the Wakefield Trinity Wildcats. He also featured in the Challenge Cup in Round 4 Workington Town to Round 5 Hull Kingston Rovers.

2016 - 2016 Season

Clough did not feature in any of the pre-season friendlies. He featured in Round 6 Batley to Round 14 Sheffield then in Round 17 Workington Town to Round 19 Halifax R.L.F.C.|Halifax. Clough played in the Challenge Cup in the 4th Round Dewsbury.

== Huddersfield Giants ==
In November 2016 Clough signed for the Huddersfield Giants on a two-year deal beginning at the start of the 2017 Super League season. He had only played 45 times, scoring one try for Bradford.

== Widnes Vikings ==
On 24 August 2020 it was announced that Clough would join Widnes for the 2021 season on a one-year deal
