= Harry Siejka =

Poland dual-code rugby international footballer

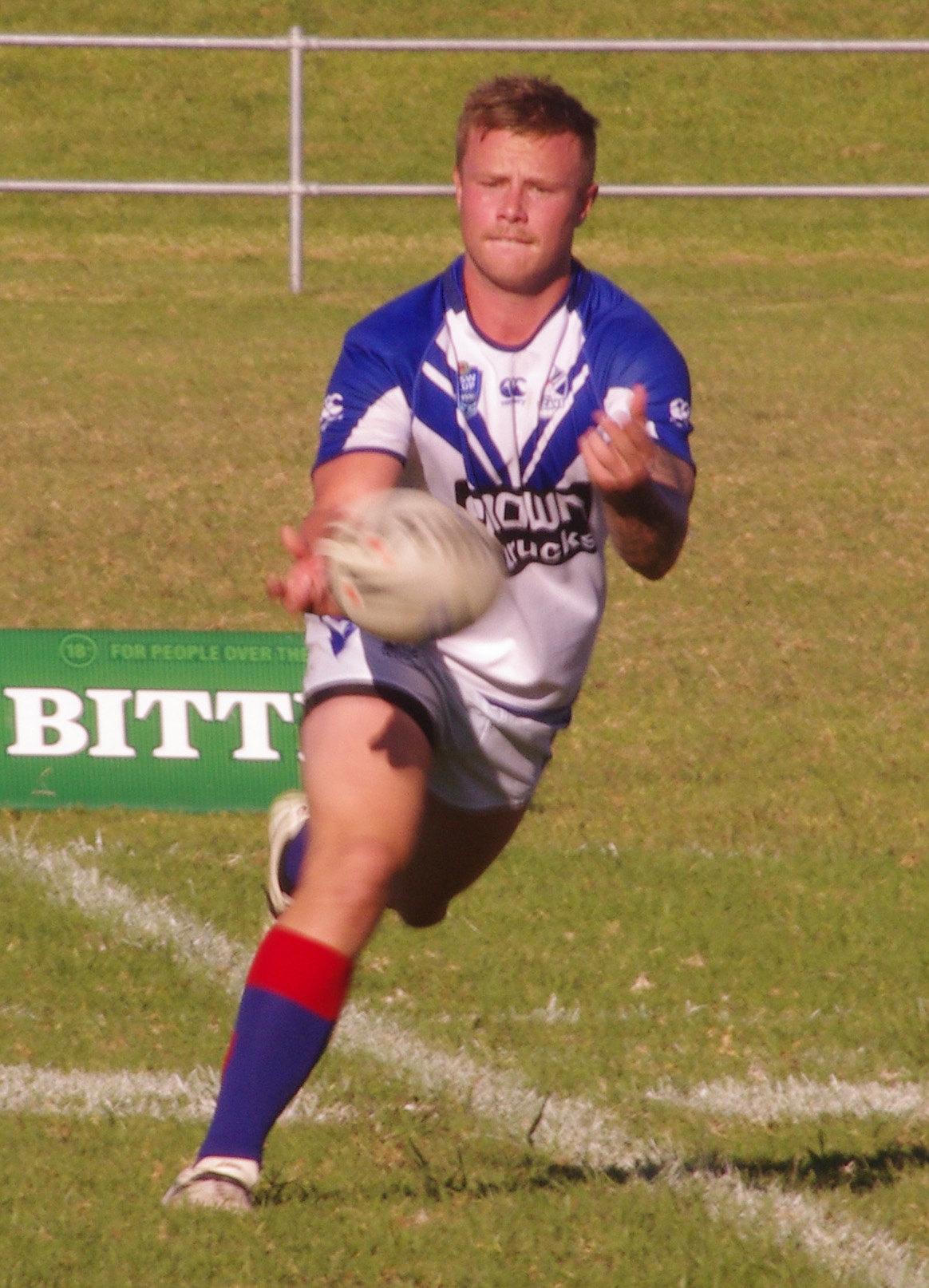

Personal information
- Born: 3 February 1992 (age 34) Bathurst, New South Wales, Australia
- Height: 177 cm (5 ft 10 in)
- Weight: 85 kg (13 st 5 lb)

Playing information

Rugby league
- Position: Five-eighth, Halfback
Club
Years	Team	Pld	T	G	FG	P
2011–12	Penrith Panthers	4	0	1	0	2
2014	Wakefield Trinity Wildcats	9	1	0	0	4
2014	Featherstone Rovers	3	0	4	0	8
2015	Bradford Bulls	15	1	4	0	12
	Total	31	2	9	0	26
Representative
Years	Team	Pld	T	G	FG	P
2018–23	Poland	6	4	8	0	32

Rugby union
- Position: Flyhalf
Representative
Years	Team	Pld	T	G	FG	P
2018	Poland	2	1	0	0	0

Coaching information
Club
Years	Team	Gms	W	D	L	W%
2023–	Cessnock Goannas		0	0
Representative
Years	Team	Gms	W	D	L	W%
2025–	Poland	1	0	0	1	0
- Source: As of 13 June 2026

Harrison "Harry" Siejka (/siːkə/) (born 3 February 1992) is an Australian rugby league footballer who most recently played for the Cessnock Goannas. He has also played for a National Rugby League clubs, the Penrith Panthers, New Zealand Warriors, Canterbury Bulldogs and St George Illawarra Dragons, and the Wakefield Trinity Wildcats and the Bradford Bulls in the Super League. He plays as a five-eighth but he can also play as a halfback. Siejka is a Polish dual-code rugby representative, having played for both the rugby league team and rugby union team.

== Early years ==
Siejka was born in Bathurst in regional New South Wales and is of Polish descent. He played his junior rugby league for the Bathurst Panthers. He attended St.Dominic’s College, Penrith.

== Playing career ==
Siejka joined the Penrith Panthers in 2008 on a A$75,000 three-year deal, a then record for a 16-year-old. He played for the Australian Schoolboys under-15 side.

He played in the Penrith NYC Team from 2010 until 2012. On 30 July 2011, Siejka made his National Rugby League début for the Panthers against the North Queensland Cowboys. Siejka made 25 tackles and kicked a goal in his side's 18–30 loss at Dairy Farmers Stadium. In his second first grade appearance, Siejka set up two of Penrith's three tries thanks to a grubber kick which lead to Trent Waterhouse's 39th NRL career try, and then, in the dying stages of the game, he played a vital role in Ryan Walker's try via some "hot potato football" from Junior Vaivai.

Siejka joined the New Zealand Warriors for the 2013 season.

On 12 June 2013, Siejka was released from his Warriors contract, after failing to make a single first-grade appearance for the club. He subsequently joined the St. George Illawarra Dragons for the remainder of the 2013 season and began training with their NSW Cup team, the Illawarra Cutters.

=== Bradford Bulls ===
Siejka signed for Bradford on a 2 year deal. He featured in the pre-season friendlies against Castleford Tigers and Leeds Rhinos. He scored a goal against the Castleford Tigers.

He featured in round 1 (Leigh Centurions) and round 2 (Whitehaven). Harry was banned for two rounds before playing in four games between round 5 (Batley Bulldogs) and round 9 (London Broncos). He played in round 18 (Workington Town) and in round 13 (Featherstone Rovers). Siejka played in Qualifier 2 (Wakefield Trinity Wildcats) and then in the games between Qualifier 5 (Hull Kingston Rovers) and Qualifier 7 (Halifax). Siejka played in the £1 Million Game against the Wakefield Trinity Wildcats. He also featured in the Challenge Cup in round 4, against Workington Town. He scored against Leigh Centurions (2 goals), Whitehaven RLFC (2 goals) and Workington Town (1 try).

He was released from his contract by mutual consent on 6 November 2015

=== Later years ===
In 2016, Siejka played for the Canterbury-Bankstown Bulldogs in the Intrust Super Premiership NSW.

Siejka represented Poland in rugby league at the 2018 Emerging Nations World Championship.

He became a dual-code international when he debuted for Poland in rugby union during the 2018–19 Rugby Europe Trophy, against Lithuania on 3 November 2018. He also played against the Netherlands on 17 November.

In 2023, Siejka signed on as Captain-Coach for the Cessnock Goannas. In June 2023, Siejka received a four match ban.
