= Lee Gaskell =

English professional rugby league footballer

Lee 'Gasky' Gaskell
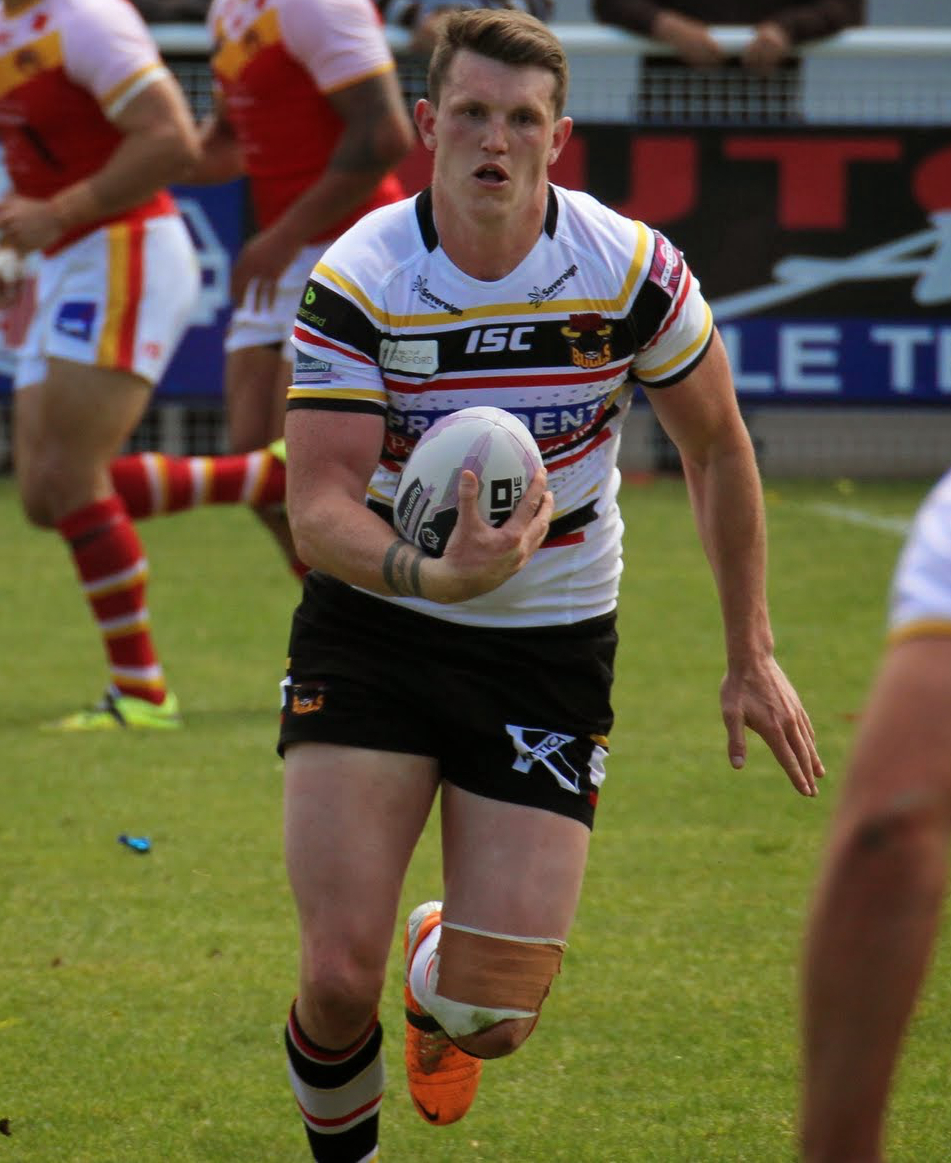

Personal information
- Full name: Lee Anthony Gaskell
- Born: 28 October 1990 (age 35) St Helens, Merseyside, England
- Height: 6 ft 3 in (1.91 m)
- Weight: 14 st 12 lb (94 kg)

Playing information
- Position: Stand-off, Fullback, Centre
Club
| Years | Team | Pld | T | G | FG | P |
|---|---|---|---|---|---|---|
| 2010–13 | St Helens | 43 | 14 | 12 | 1 | 81 |
| 2013(loan) | → Salford Red Devils | 18 | 8 | 3 | 0 | 38 |
| 2014–16 | Bradford Bulls | 56 | 34 | 3 | 0 | 142 |
| 2017–21 | Huddersfield Giants | 95 | 26 | 32 | 1 | 169 |
| 2022–23 | Wakefield Trinity | 24 | 4 | 2 | 0 | 20 |
| 2023–25 | Bradford Bulls | 24 | 4 | 1 | 0 | 18 |
| 2025– | Hunslet | 13 | 1 | 1 | 0 | 6 |
| | Total | 273 | 91 | 54 | 2 | 474 |
- As of 18 March 2025

Lee Gaskell (born 28 October 1990) is an English professional rugby league footballer plays as a stand-off, fullback or centre for Hunslet in the RFL Championship.

He has also played in the Super League for St Helens and spent time on loan from Saints at the Salford Red Devils. He played for the Bradford Bulls in the Super League and in the Kingstone Press Championship.

== Background ==
Gaskell was born in St Helens, Merseyside, England.

He started his career with amateur club Blackbrook Royals.

== Playing career ==
=== St Helens ===
Gaskell made his Super League début for St Helens in a loss at home to Catalans Dragons in round 21 of 2010's Super League XV. He started the match at stand-off and scored a try.

He played in the 2011 Super League Grand Final defeat by Leeds at Old Trafford.

In 2013, Gaskell moved to Salford as part of a loan deal.

Near the end of the 2013 season, Bradford announced that they had signed Gaskell on a two-year deal. In November 2016, he signed a four-year deal with Huddersfield.

=== Bradford Bulls ===
Gaskell featured in the pre-season friendlies against Hull FC and Dewsbury.

Gaskell featured in Round 1 (Castleford) to Round 2 (Wakefield Trinity Wildcats). After returning from injury he played in Round 8 (Salford) to Round 26 (Widnes). In the Challenge Cup he featured in Round 5 (Catalans Dragons) and the Quarter Final (Warrington).

Gaskell signed a two-year extension to his contract. He featured in the pre-season friendlies against Castleford and Leeds.

He featured in Round 1 (Leigh) to Round 16 (Doncaster). Gaskell played in Qualifier 1 (Sheffield Eagles) to Qualifier 2 (Wakefield Trinity Wildcats) then in Qualifier 7 (Halifax). Gaskell played in the £1 Million Game (Wakefield Trinity Wildcats). He also featured in the Challenge Cup in Round 4 (Workington Town) to Round 5 (Hull Kingston Rovers).

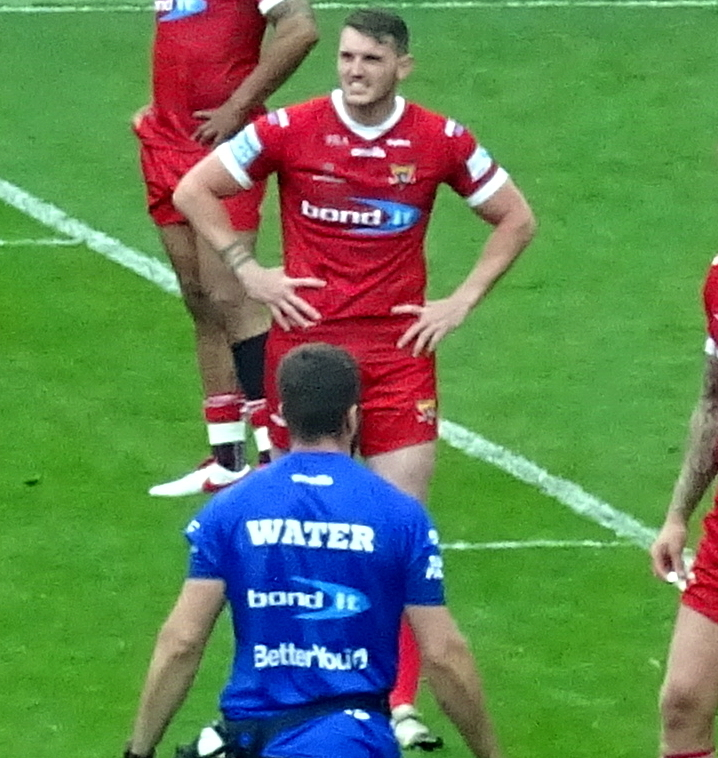
Gaskell playing for the Huddersfield Giants in 2019

Gaskell featured in the pre-season friendly against Leeds.

Gaskell featured in Round 1 (Featherstone Rovers) to Round 4 (Leigh) then in Round 6 (Batley) to Round 10 (Dewsbury Rams). Gaskell featured in Round 13 (Swinton Lions) to Round 14 (Sheffield Eagles). Gaskell played in the Challenge Cup in the 4th Round (Dewsbury).

At the end of 2017, Gaskell signed a four-year deal to join Super League side Huddersfield.

=== Huddersfield Giants ===
Gaskell was rewarded with his performances for Huddersfield by winning four awards at the Giants' 2019 end of season awards ceremony. In round 5 of the 2021 Super League season, he kicked a field goal in the final second of the match as Huddersfield defeated Leeds 14-13 to claim their first win of the season. The following week, he scored two tries in a 26-20 victory over Warrington.

=== Wakefield Trinity ===
On 28 June 2021, it was reported that he had signed for Wakefield Trinity in the Super League.

=== Bradford Bulls (rejoin) ===
On 19 June 2023, it was reported that he had rejoined Bradford Bulls in the RFL Championship.

=== Hunslet RLFC ===
On 18 March 2025 it was reported that he had signed for Hunslet RLFC in the RFL Championship
