= Nathan Conroy =

English rugby league footballer

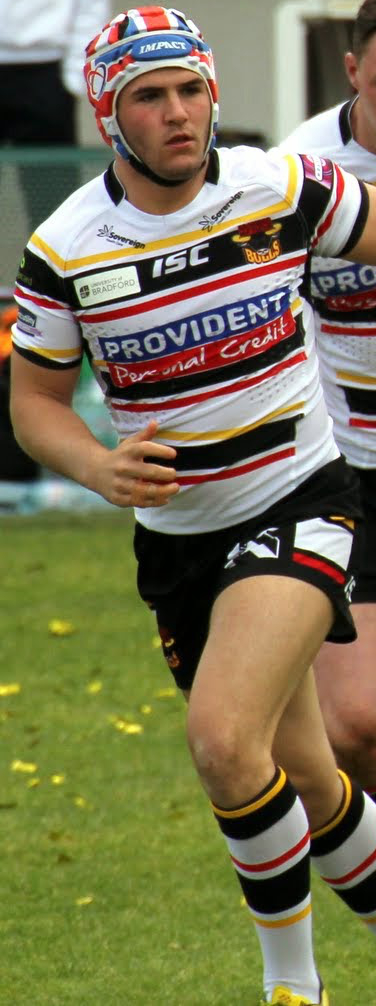

Personal information
- Full name: Nathaniel Conroy
- Born: 6 March 1995 (age 31) Bradford, West Yorkshire, England

Playing information
- Position: Hooker
Club
Years	Team	Pld	T	G	FG	P
2013–15	Bradford Bulls	6	0	0	0	0
2015(loan)	→ Oxford	2	2	1	0	10
2015(loan)	→ Dewsbury Rams	8	2	0	0	8
2016	Dewsbury Rams	7	0	0	0	0
2017–18	Keighley Cougars	19	2	0	0	8
2019–20	Coventry Bears	15	0	0	0	0
2020–21	Hunslet RLFC	5	1	0	0	4
2022	Cornwall RLFC	8	1	0	0	4
2022–24	Hunslet RLFC	0	0	0	0	0
2024–	Cornwall RLFC	0	0	0	0	0
	Total	70	8	1	0	34
- Source: As of 22 April 2024

Nathan Conroy (born 6 March 1995) is an English professional rugby league footballer who last played as a hooker for the Cornwall RLFC in RFL League 1.

He has previously played for the Bradford Bulls, and played on loan from Bradford at Oxford in League 1 and the Dewsbury Rams in the Championship. A permanent move to Dewsbury was followed by two seasons at the Keighley Cougars in League 1.

== Playing career ==
=== Bradford Bulls ===
Conroy has been involved in the Bradford Bulls scholarship system from the under 15s and was given a 2-year professional contract midway through the 2013 season.

==== 2013 ====
He featured in round 27 against the Huddersfield Giants.

==== 2014 ====
Conroy featured in the pre-season games against Hull FC, Dewsbury Rams and Castleford Tigers.

Conroy featured in round 10 (Wigan Warriors) and round 14 (Catalans Dragons). Conroy also played in round 27, against the London Broncos. He featured in round 4 of the Challenge Cup against Oldham.

Despite their relegation to the Championship, he signed a new 1-year contract with the Bulls.

==== 2015 ====
Conroy featured in the pre-season friendlies against Castleford Tigers and Leeds Rhinos.

He played in round 5, against the Batley Bulldogs.

At the end of the season Conroy made his loan move to the Dewsbury Rams a permanent one.

=== Dewsbury Rams ===
Conroy featured in round 1 (Swinton Lions), round 2 and round 3 (Oldham). He also played in round 5 (Featherstone Rovers), round 8 (Sheffield Eagles) and round 9 (Leigh Centurions). Conroy played in the Challenge Cup in round 4 against the Bradford Bulls.

=== Keighley Cougars ===
He joined the Keighley Cougars for 2017.

It was rumoured that Conroy has signed for Hull F.C. on a trial basis.

=== Coventry Bears ===
On 23 Nov 2018 it was reported that Conroy would join the Coventry Bears.

=== Hunslet RLFC ===
On 12 Jan 2020 it was reported that Conroy had signed for Hunslet.

=== Cornwall RLFC ===
On 12 Apr 2024 it was reported that he had signed for Cornwall RLFC in the RFL League 1 for the remainder of the 2024 season
