= John Clough (rugby league) =

English rugby league footballer

Personal information
- Full name: John Clough
- Born: 13 September 1984 (age 42) St Helens, Merseyside, England

Playing information
- Position: hooker
Club
Years	Team	Pld	T	G	FG	P
2003–06	Salford City Reds	18	1	0	0	4
2006	Halifax	9	3	0	0	12
2007	Leigh Centurions	11	2	0	0	8
2007–10	Blackpool Panthers	80	29	0	0	116
2011–12	Oldham	49	16	0	0	64
2013	Oxford	18	8	2	1	37
	Total	185	59	2	1	241
- Relatives: Paul Clough (brother)

John Clough (born 13 September 1984 in St. Helens) is a former rugby league footballer for Salford City Reds (2003–06), Halifax (2006), Leigh Centurions (2007), Blackpool Panthers (2007–10), Oldham (2011–12) and Oxford (2013) as a hooker. John Clough is a former Lancashire and Great Britain Academy representative.

In March 2003, Clough made his debut for Salford against Gateshead Thunder.

== Genealogical information ==
John Clough is brother of the rugby league footballer, Paul Clough.
