= 2013 Rugby League World Cup qualification – Atlantic =

The 2013 Rugby League World Cup Atlantic qualification is a rugby league tournament that was held in October 2011 to decide the qualification for the 2013 Rugby League World Cup. It consisted of a round-robin play-off involving three teams; South Africa, Jamaica and the United States at Campbell's Field, New Jersey in the United States.

== Standings ==
Team	Pld	W	D	L	TF	PF	PA	+/−	BP	Pts
United States	2	2	0	0	0	80	8	+72	0	4
Jamaica	2	1	0	1	0	24	46	−22	0	2
South Africa	2	0	0	2	0	10	60	−50	0	0

== United States vs South Africa ==
15 October 2011

United States	40–4	South Africa
Tries: Taylor (2), Cunz (2), Cantoni, Taufa, D Howard, Stevens; Conv: Joseph Paulo (4)	(Report)	Try: Fritz; Conv:

Campbell's Field, New Jersey

FB	1
RW	2
RC	3
LC	4
LW	5
SO	6
SH	7
PR	8
HK	9
PR	10
SR	11
SR	12
LF	13
Substitutions:
IC	14
IC	15
IC	16
IC	17
Coach:

FB	1
RW	2
RC	3
LC	4
LW	5
FE	6
HB	7
PR	8
HK	9
PR	10
SR	11
SR	12
LK	13
Substitutions:
IC	14
IC	15
IC	16
IC	17
Coach:

== South Africa vs Jamaica ==
19 October 2011

South Africa	6–20	Jamaica
Tries: Prinsloo; Conv: Van der Nest 1/1	(Report)	Try: Reittie (2), White, Grant; Conv: Coleman 2/4

Campbell's Field, New Jersey
Attendance: 30

FB	1
RW	2
RC	3
LC	4
LW	5
SO	6
SH	7
PR	8
HK	9
PR	10
SR	11
SR	12
LF	13
Substitutions:
IC	14
IC	15
IC	16
IC	17
Coach:

FB	1	Paul White
RW	2	Waine Pryce
RC	3	Corey Hanson
LC	4	Ryan Grant
LW	5	Wayne Rettie
FE	6	Karl Pryce
HB	7	Jymel Coleman
PR	8	Romaine Campbell
HK	9	Jamaine Wray
PR	10	Jode Sheriffe
SR	11	Lamont Bryan
SR	12	Daniel Bravo
LK	13	Joe Brown
Substitutions:
IC	14	Richie Barnett
IC	15	Roy Calvert
IC	16	Tyrone Rowe
IC	17	Ross Peltier
Coach:

== Jamaica vs United States ==
23 October 2011

Jamaica	4–40	United States
Tries: Hanson; Conv: Coleman 0/1	(Report)	Tries: S Howard, Marando, Stevens, Cantoni, Miles, D Howard, Offerdahl; Conv: Joseph Paulo 6/9

Campbell's Field, New Jersey
Attendance: 800

FB	1	Paul White
RW	2	Waine Pryce
RC	3	Richie Barnett
LC	4	Omari Caro
LW	5	Wayne Rettie
SO	6	Karl Pryce
SH	7	Jymel Coleman
PR	8	Lamont Bryan
HK	9	Jamaine Wray
PR	10	Jode Sheriffe
SR	11	Daniel Bravo
SR	12	Corey Hanson
LF	13	Joe Brown
Substitutions:
IC	14	Ryan Grant
IC	15	Tyrone Rowe
IC	16	Ashley Johnson
IC	17	Ross Peltier
Coach:

FB	1
RW	2
RC	3
LC	4
LW	5
FE	6
HB	7
PR	8
HK	9
PR	10
SR	11
SR	12
LK	13
Substitutions:
IC	14
IC	15
IC	16
IC	17
Coach:

Coached by Matt Elliott, the Tomahawks were leading 6–4 at half time and then shut out the Rugby Reggae Boys for the rest of the game finishing with a total of seven tries to gain a place in their first World Cup tournament.

== Squads ==
=== Jamaica ===
The Jamaica squad as of 22 September 2011 is as follows:

- Coach: (Jamaica) Dean Thomas

Club Team	Players
(England) Batley Bulldogs	Wayne Allen, Daley Williams
(England) Coventry Bears	Ashley Johnson
(Jamaica) Duhaney Park Red Sharks	Romaen Campbell, Roy Calvert, Damon Gayle, Ryan Grant, Marvin Thompson
(England) Gateshead Thunder	Joseph Brown
(England) Halifax	Jode Sheriffe, Paul White
(England) Harlequins RL	Lamont Bryan, Omari Caro
(England) Huddersfield Giants	Ross Peltier
(England) Hunslet Hawks	Richie Barnett, Waine Pryce
(England) Keighley Cougars	Jymel Coleman, Jamaine Wray
(England) Leeds Rhinos	Danny Bravo, Jamal Chisholm
(United States) New Haven Warriors	Wesley Haughton
(England) Sheffield Eagles	Corey Hanson, Reece Williams
(England) Wigan Warriors	Karl Pryce
(Jamaica) Vauxhall Vultures	Carlye Burgher, Jahdeek Clarke, Sandino Hastings, Tyronie Rowe

=== South Africa ===
The South Africa squad as at 22 September 2011 is as follows:

- Coach: (South Africa) Steven van Zyl

Club Team	Players
(South Africa) Bloemfontein Roosters	Henry du Toit, Stevie Meyer, Gerrie Slabber, Christoff Swanepoel
(South Africa) Brakpan Bears	Francois Greyvensteyn, Christo Joubert, Andre Loader, Andre Olwagen, Rudi Prinsloo
(South Africa) Ermelo Tomahawks	Pieter Lee
(South Africa) Middelburg Tigers	Johan Fritz
South Wales Scorpions	Christiaan Roets
(South Africa) Tuks Bulls	Hans du Plessis, Gerhard de Wet, Riaan Engelbrecht, Deon Kraemer, Christo Louw, Siviwe Mpondo, JP Nel, Marcelle Slabbert, Jonothan Soares, Pieter van der Nest, Franco Vermeulen, Rupert Wells

=== United States ===
- Coach: (Australia) Matthew Elliott

Club Team	Players
(United States) Aston Bulls	Michael Garvey, Andrew Kneisly, Louis Tulio
(Australia) Belrose Eagles	David Marando
(England) Castleford Tigers	Ryan McGoldrick
(United States) Connecticut Wildcats	Curtis Cunz, Charles Rizzo, Salesi Tongamoa
(Australia) Easts Tigers	Mark Offerdahl
(England) Gateshead Thunder	Mitchell Stevens
(United States) Hawaii Islanders	Keiki Misipeka, Jayson Rego, Joshua Rice
(United States) Jacksonville Axemen	Apple Pope
(United States) Louisville	Nate Smith
(United States) Maui Rugby	Kelly McGill, Sione Taufa
(United States) New York Knights	Fitz James Adams, Charles Cortalano, Ian Elliott, Justin Ripley, Sean Taylor
(Australia) Northern Pride	Mark Cantoni
(United States) Northern Raiders	Leslie Alovili
(Australia) Parramatta Eels	Joseph Paulo
(Australia) Penrith Panthers	Junior Paulo
(Australia) Tuggeranong Valley	Stephen Howard
(Australia) Wentworthville Magpies	Daniel Howard
Unattached	David Myles, Matthew Petersen
