= List of Jamaica national rugby league team players =

This article contains a list in alphabetical order of rugby league players who have played for Jamaica in full international matches since the team's first match in 2009.

As of 11 July 2022

== A ==
- Mo Agoro
- Jordan Andrade

== B ==
- Chevaughn Bailey
- Antonio Baker
- Chris Ball
- Hamish Barnes
- Richie Barnett
- Ramorio Bartley
- Lewis Bowman
- Junior Brandford
- Danny Bravo
- Alex Brown
- Joe Brown
- Michael Brown
- Javane Bryan
- Keta Bryan
- Lamont Bryan
- Carlye Burgher

== C ==
- Roy Calvert
- Nathan Campbell
- Romaen Campbell
- Omari Caro
- Mason Caton-Brown
- Darius Carter
- Jahdeek Clarke
- Isaac Coleman
- Jermaine Coleman
- Jy-Mel Coleman

== D ==
- Jayden Dayes
- Andrew Dixon
- Ethon Dwyer

== E ==
- Oshane Edie

== F ==
- Izaac Farrell
- Joel Farrell
- Andrew Fong

== G ==
- Damon Gayle
- Delaine Gittens-Bedward
- Ashton Golding
- Jamel Goodall
- Jason Gooden
- Daniel Graham
- Jakeba Grant
- Ryan Grant
- Kymani Green
- Roland Grey

== H ==
- Adrian Hall
- Greg Hall
- Corey Hanson
- Alec Harris
- Kareem Harris
- Jade Harrison
- Sandino Hastings
- Wes Haughton
- Chawn Henry
- Joshua Hill
- Bradley Ho
- Joshua Hudson-Lett
- Brian Hutchinson

== J ==
- Omar James
- Ashley Johnson
- Greg Johnson
- Omar Jones
- Orlando Jones
- Aaron Jones-Bishop
- Ben Jones-Bishop

== L ==
- Michael Lawrence
- Owen Linton
- Tahj-Jay Lynch

== M ==
- Jason MacFarlane
- Jon Magrin
- Abevia McDonald
- Demone McDougal
- Andrae McFarlane
- Khamisi McKain
- Adam McKenzie
- Adrian McKenzie
- Alpachino Mignott
- Steve Miller
- Jimmy Morgan
- Kenardo Morgan
- Jenson Morris
- Akeem Murray
- Adrian Myers

== N ==
- Dwain Nelson
- Kile Nembhard

== O ==
- Jacob Ogden

== P ==
- Andrew Pang
- Michael Pearson
- Ross Peltier
- Jermaine Pinnock
- Karl Pryce
- Steve Pryce
- Waine Pryce

== R ==
- Keenan Ramsden
- Andre Reid
- Wayne Reittie
- Everton Richards
- Hakeem Richards
- Reinhardo Richards
- Robert Rodney
- Tyronie Rowe
- Kieran Rush
- Ricardo Richards

== S ==
- Duain Scott
- Stephen Scott
- Joseph Shae
- Jode Sheriffe
- Andrew Simpson
- Leo Skerrett-Evans
- Aaron Small
- Orien Smith

== T ==
- Peter Tapper
- Adrian Thomas
- Danny Thomas
- Kevin Thomas
- Leon Thomas
- Marvin Thompson
- Mohenjo Thompson
- Tremaine Thompson-Griffiths
- Keenen Tomlinson
- Fabion Turner

== W ==
- Renaldo Wade
- Kenneth Walker
- AJ Wallace
- Kemoy White
- Paul White
- Kadeem Williams
- Kamarine Williams
- Mike Williams
- James Woodburn-Hall
- Jamaine Wray
- Nicholas Wright

== Y ==
- Claude Yen
- Alex Young
