= 2017 Rugby League World Cup qualification – Americas =

The 2017 Rugby League World Cup Americas qualification was a rugby league tournament that was held in December 2015 to decide the American qualifier for the 2017 Rugby League World Cup. It consisted of a round-robin tournament involving three teams, Canada, Jamaica and the United States, at two venues in Florida in the United States.

The United States won the tournament and qualified for the World Cup.

== Overview ==
On 3 October 2014, the 2017 Rugby League World Cup qualifying competition was announced. Seven of the eight teams who made the knockout-stages of the 2013 Rugby League World Cup were announced as automatic qualifiers.

USA, who were quarter-finalists in 2013, were denied automatic qualification due to an internal governance dispute which saw the nation's Rugby League International Federation membership temporarily suspended. Once the issue was resolved, USA was allowed to enter the qualification process. In August 2015, the qualifiers were announced to be held in Florida in December 2015.

== Squads ==
=== Canada ===
The Canada squad as of 26 November 2015 was as follows:

- Coach: (Canada) Aaron Zimmerle

Club Team	Players
(England) Bradford Dudley Hill	Chad Bain
(Canada) Brantford Broncos	Billy Gemmell, Christian Miller, Steve Piatek
(Canada) Capilano Cougars	Alex Boyd
(Australia) Easts Tigers	Tom Dempsey
(Australia) Jamberoo Superoos	Steve Bouchard
(England) London Skolars	Louis Robinson
(Australia) Souths Logan Magpies	Rhys Jacks
(Australia) Sunshine Coast Falcons	Ryley Jacks
(Canada) Surrey Beavers	Jamie Kelly
(Canada) Toronto Centurions	Jonathan Cregg, Robin Legault, Matt Wyles
(Canada) Toronto City Saints	Eddie Bilborough, Antoine Blanc, Enoch Wamalwa
(Canada) Valley Warriors	Daniel Blasco-Morris, Rick Schouten, Adam Timler

=== Jamaica ===
The Jamaica squad as of 25 November 2015 was as follows:

- Coach: (Jamaica) Romeo Monteith

Club Team	Players
(England) Batley Bulldogs	Alex Brown, Wayne Reittie
(England) Bradford Bulls	Omari Caro
(England) Dewsbury Rams	Joel Farrell
(Jamaica) Duhaney Park Red Sharks	Jermaine Pinnock, Renaldo Wade
(Jamaica) GC Foster College	Ryan Grant
(England) Keighley Cougars	Hamish Barnes, Ross Peltier
(England) Hunslet Hawks	Daniel Thomas, Mo Agoro, Richie Barnett
(Jamaica) Mico University College	Antonio Baker
(France) RC Lescure-Arthes XIII	Lamont Bryan
(England) Newcastle Thunder	Joe Brown
(England) Sheffield Eagles	Corey Hanson
(Jamaica) University of Technology	Nathan Campbell, Marvin Thompson
(Jamaica) Vauxhall Rugby Club	Tyronie Rowe
Unattached	Brian Hutchinson

=== United States ===
The USA squad as of 25 November 2015 was as follows:

On 2 December the US team suffered a setback after Tui Samoa pulled out of the squad for personal reasons. He was replaced by Corey Makelim.

- Coach: (England) Brian McDermott

Club Team	Players
(United States) Atlanta Rhinos	Nick Newlin
(United States) Central Florida Warriors	Taylor Alley
(United States) Connecticut Wildcats	Matt Walsh
(United States) Chicago Stockyarders	Taylor Howden
(United States) Delaware Black Foxes	Kevin Wiggins
(United States) Jacksonville Axemen	Jon Purnell
(England) London Broncos	Mark Offerdahl
(Australia) Wests Panthers	Kristian Freed, Luke Barron
(United States) New York Knights	Abe Cohen
(Australia) Norths Devils	Sam Carson
(United States) Northern Virginia Eagles	Ryan Burroughs
(United States) Philadelphia Fight	Casey Clark, Rich Henson, Andrew Kneisly, Roman Lowery, Mike Timpano
(Australia) Wentworthville Magpies	Danny Howard, Steve Howard, Corey Makelim

== Standings ==
Key to colours in table
Qualified for the 2017 Rugby League World Cup

Team	Pld	W	D	L	PF	PA	PD	Pts
United States	2	2	0	0	54	38	+16	4
Jamaica	2	0	1	1	32	38	−6	1
Canada	2	0	1	1	42	52	−10	1

== Fixtures ==
=== United States vs Jamaica ===
4 December 2015

United States	20 – 14	Jamaica
Try: Offerdahl 10'; Howden 12'; D. Howard 43'; Makelim 54'; Goal: Freed (2/4)	Report	Try: Peltier (2) 30', 78'; Farrell 49'; Goal: Farrell (1/3)

Hodges Stadium, Jacksonville
Referee: (England) Robert Hicks
Player of the Match: (United States) Mark Offerdahl

FB	1	Corey Makelim
RW	22	Taylor Howden
RC	3	Taylor Alley
LC	4	Daniel Howard
LW	5	Mike Timpano
FE	6	Rich Henson
HB	7	Matt Walsh
PR	8	Steve Howard
HK	2	Kristian Freed
PR	9	Mark Offerdahl (c)
SR	11	Abe Cohen
SR	12	Casey Clark
LF	13	Jon Purnell
Substitutes:
IC	14	Ryan Burroughs
IC	15	Andrew Kneisly
IC	16	Nick Newlin
IC	17	Sam Carson (yellow card) 33' to 43'
Coach:
Brian McDermott

FB	1	Wayne Reittie
RW	2	Alex Brown
RC	3	Richie Barnett
LC	4	Renaldo Wade
LW	5	Omari Caro (yellow card) 39' to 49'
FE	6	Joel Farrell
HB	7	Daniel Thomas
PR	8	Antonio Baker
HK	9	Marvin Thompson
PR	10	Ross Peltier
SR	11	Nathan Campbell
SR	12	Corey Hanson (c)
LK	13	} Lamont Bryan
Substitutes:
IC	14	Joe Brown
IC	15	Tyronie Rowe
IC	16	Ryan Grant
IC	17	Mo Agoro
Coach:
Romeo Monteith

=== Canada vs Jamaica ===
8 December 2015

Canada	18 – 18	Jamaica
Try: Ryley Jacks 63'; Legault (2) 76', 79'; Goal: Piatek (3/3)	Report	Try: Bryan 21'; A. Brown 26'; Reittie 57'; Goal: Farrell (3/5)

Spec Martin Stadium, DeLand
Referee: (England) Robert Hicks
Player of the Match: (Canada) Robin Legault

FB	1	Robin Legault
RW	2	Billy Gemmell
RC	3	Jonathan Cregg
LC	4	Rick Schouten
LW	5	Adam Timler
FE	6	Ryley Jacks
HB	7	Steve Piatek
PR	8	Louis Robinson
HK	9	Rhys Jacks
PR	10	Tom Dempsey
SR	11	Christian Miller
SR	12	Steve Bouchard
LF	13	Jamie Kelly
Substitutes:
IC	14	Matt Wyles
IC	15	Enoch Wamalwa
IC	16	Antoine Blanc
IC	17	Alex Boyd
Coach:
Aaron Zimmerle

FB	1	Wayne Reittie
RW	2	Alex Brown
RC	3	Richie Barnett
LC	4	Hamish Barnes
LW	5	Omari Caro
FE	6	Joel Farrell
HB	7	Corey Hanson
PR	8	Nathan Campbell
HK	9	Marvin Thompson
PR	10	Ross Peltier
SR	11	Jermaine Pinnock
SR	12	Mo Agoro
LK	13	Lamont Bryan
Substitutes:
IC	14	Joe Brown
IC	15	Tyronie Rowe (yellow card) 63' to 73'
IC	16	Renaldo Wade
IC	17	Brian Hutchinson
Coach:
Romeo Monteith

=== United States vs Canada ===
This match was also the third and final game of the 2015 Colonial Cup series.

12 December 2015

United States	34 – 24	Canada
Try: Alley (2) 2', 53'; Howden (2) '9, '44; D. Howard (3) 36', 58', 79'; Burroughs 63'; Goal: Howden (1/4)	Report	Try: Kelly 18'; Ryley Jacks (3) 32', 40', 66'; Goal: Piatek (4/4)

Hodges Stadium, Jacksonville
Referee: (England) Robert Hicks
Player of the Match: (United States) Mark Offerdahl

FB	1	Corey Makelim (red card) 32'
RW	23	Taylor Howden
RC	4	Taylor Alley
LC	3	Ryan Burroughs
LW	5	Roman Lowery
FE	6	Rich Henson
HB	7	Matt Walsh
PR	8	Nick Newlin
HK	2	Kristian Freed
PR	9	Mark Offerdahl (c)
SR	11	Daniel Howard
SR	12	Casey Clark
LF	21	Steve Howard
Substitutes:
IC	17	Jon Purnell
IC	16	Sam Carson
IC	15	Andrew Kneisly
IC	14	Luke Barron
Coach:
Brian McDermott

FB	1	Robin Legault
RW	2	Billy Gemmell
RC	3	Jonathan Cregg
LC	4	Rick Schouten
LW	5	Adam Timler
FE	6	Ryley Jacks
HB	7	Steve Piatek
PR	8	Tom Dempsey
HK	9	Rhys Jacks
PR	10	Louis Robinson
SR	11	Christian Miller
SR	12	Steve Bouchard
LF	13	Jamie Kelly
Substitutes:
IC	14	Matt Wyles
IC	15	Enoch Wamalwa
IC	16	Daniel Blasco-Morris
IC	17	Alex Boyd
Coach:
Aaron Zimmerle
