= 2011 in rugby league =

Top-level rugby league in 2011 centered on Australasia's 2011 NRL season and the Super League XVI. High-profile representative competitions included the 2011 Four Nations (held in Wales and England), the 2011 State of Origin series and the 2011 European Cup. 2013 World Cup qualifying also took place in 2011.

== January ==
- 18: Queensland, Australia – Australian prop forward of the century (1908–2008), Duncan Hall dies age 85.
- 27: Parramatta, Australia – The 2011 Legends of Origin charity match is won by Queensland Legends who beat New South Wales Legends 20–16 to raise over $380,000 for 2010–2011 Queensland flood victims before a crowd of around 20,000.

== February ==
- 5: The International 9's tournament is played at New Era Stadium, Cabramatta. Plate Grand Final: Macarthur Brothers 28 def Japan 12. Trophy Grand Final: Mounties 22 def Bankstown 10. Cup Grand Final: Balmain Ryde-Eastwood Tigers 6 def Fiji 4.
- 5: Greymouth, New Zealand – A capacity crowd of 6,500 (almost a quarter of the West Coast population) watched the New Zealand Warriors draw 22 all with the Newcastle Knights in the Pike River Mine disaster Solidarity Cup charity game.
- 12: The NRL All Stars defeated the Indigenous All Stars 28–12 in front of 25,843 at Skilled Park, Gold Coast, Australia to square the new format at one win apiece.
- 27: Wigan, England - In the 2011 World Club Challenge St George Illawarra Dragons defeat the Wigan Warriors 21–15 at DW Stadium in front of 24,268 spectators.

== March ==
- 11: Sydney, Australia – The first match of the NRL's 2011 Telstra Premiership is won by the Sydney Roosters, who defeated the South Sydney Rabbitohs 40–29 at the Sydney Football Stadium before a crowd of 28,703.
- 31: Leeds, England – The Rugby Football League announce the Widnes Vikings as their choice for a three-year Super League licence, allowing the club to return to the competition in 2012 after a six-year absence.

== April ==
- 22: Hochspeyer, Germany – Serbia defeated Germany 90–6 in the friendly warm-up game for nations' international games this year, 2013 RLWC qualifiers and European Shield, respectively.

== May ==
- 6: Gold Coast, Australia – In the 2011 ANZAC Test Australia defeat New Zealand 20–10 at Skilled Park before a crowd of 26,301.

== June ==
- 10: Leeds, England – In the inaugural International Origin match, the Exiles defeat England 16–12 at Headingley Stadium before a crowd of 14,174.

== July ==
- 6: Brisbane, Australia – In the 3rd and deciding match of the 2011 State of Origin series Queensland defeat New South Wales 34–24 at Suncorp Stadium before a crowd of 52,498.
- 26: Wrexham, Wales – Super League club Crusaders announce their withdrawal from 2012's Super League XVII.

== August ==
- 27: London, England – The 2011 Challenge Cup is won by the Wigan Warriors who defeated the Leeds Rhinos 28–18 in the final at Wembley Stadium before a crowd of 78,482.

== September ==
- 6: Sydney, Australia - Melbourne fullback Billy Slater is awarded the Dally M Medal at the 2011 Dally M Awards held in The Entertainment Quarter
- 24: Lae, Papua New Guinea – The Australian Prime Minister's XIII defeat Papua New Guinea 36–22 before a crowd of around 25,000.

== October ==
- 2: Sydney, Australia - The 2011 NRL season culminates in the 2011 NRL Grand Final in which the Manly-Warringah Sea Eagles defeated the New Zealand Warriors 24 – 10 at ANZ Stadium before a crowd of 81,988.
- 4: Manchester, England - The 2011 Man of Steel Award for Super League player of the year goes to Castleford's stand-off half, Rangi Chase.
- 24: New Jersey, United States of America – The United States national rugby league team defeats Jamaica 40–4 to qualify for the 2013 Rugby League World Cup, their first ever.
- 30: Belgrade, Serbia – The Italy national rugby league team gain the 14th and final place in the 2013 World Cup by drawing with Lebanon 19-all.

== November ==
- 1: London, England - Harlequins Rugby League announce a change in name and playing kit, returning to the London Broncos brand.
- 3: London, England – The annual RLIF Awards dinner is held at the Tower of London. Winners were:
  - Player of the year: Billy Slater (Melbourne)
  - Rookie of the year: Jharal Yow Yeh (Brisbane)
  - Coach of the year: Des Hasler (Manly-Warringah)
  - Referee of the year: Tony Archer (Australia)
  - Fullback of the year: Billy Slater (Melbourne)
  - Wing of the year: Akuila Uate (Newcastle)
  - Centre of the year: Jamie Lyon (Manly-Warringah)
  - Stand-off of the year: Benji Marshall (Wests)
  - Scrum-half of the year: Daly Cherry-Evans (Manly-Warringah)
  - Prop of the year: Matt Scott (North Queensland)
  - Hooker of the year: Cameron Smith (Melbourne)
  - Second-row of the year: Sam Thaiday (Brisbane)
  - Loose forward of the year: Paul Gallen (Cronulla-Sutherland)
  - Canada player of the year: Matt Wyles
  - Cook Islands player of the year: Tinirau Arona
  - Czech Republic player of the year: Jan Buben
  - Fiji player of the year: Wes Naiqama
  - France player of the year: Rémi Casty
  - Germany player of the year: Thomas Isaak
  - Ireland player of the year: Tim Bergin
  - Italy player of the year: Matteo Rossi
  - Jamaica player of the year: Tyronie Rowe
  - Japan player of the year: Keisuke Kinoshita
  - Malta player of the year: Clifford Debattista
  - Norway player of the year: Sonny Mellor
  - Lebanon player of the year: Walid Yassine
  - Russia player of the year: Eduard Ososkov
  - Samoa player of the year: George Carmont
  - Scotland player of the year: Dale Ferguson
  - Serbia player of the year: Dalibor Vukanovic
  - South Africa player of the year: Deon Kraemer
  - Sweden player of the year: Alexander Rappestad
  - Tonga player of the year: Feleti Mateo
  - Ukraine player of the year: Vladimir Mashkin
  - USA player of the year: Apple Pope
  - Wales player of the year: Lloyd White.
- 19: Leeds, England - The 2011 Four Nations tournament culminates in Australia's 30–8 victory over England in the final at Elland Road before a crowd of 34,174. This was the last game in the record-breaking career of Australian captain Darren Lockyer.

== December ==
- 1: Paradise Point, Australia - Australian prop forward of the century (1908–2007), Arthur Beetson dies, aged 66.

== See also ==
- 2011 New Zealand rugby league season
