= Maggot (disambiguation) =

A maggot is the larva of a fly.

Maggot or Maggott may also refer to:

== Music ==
- Maggot (rapper) (born 1976), Welsh rapper
- Maggots: The Record, 1987 album by The Plasmatics
- The Maggot, a 1999 album by Melvins
- Maggot (album), a 2017 album by Dazey and the Scouts
- "Maggots", a 1990 song by Gwar from Scumdogs of the Universe
- "Maggots", a 2000 song by The Screaming Jets from Scam
- "Maggot", a 2004 song by Angelspit from Nurse Grenade
- "Maggots", a nickname for fans of the band Slipknot; see Vol. 3: (The Subliminal Verses)
- Mr Shilkret's Maggot, a short piece for jazz band by the English classical composer Gustav Holst

== Characters ==
- Maggots (Corpse Bride), from the Tim Burton film Corpse Bride
- Maggot, a main character in the animated children's program Zombie Hotel
- Maggott, a mutant superhero in the Marvel Comics universe
- Archer J. Maggott, a character in the film The Dirty Dozen

== Other uses ==
- A Maggot, a novel by British author John Fowles, published in 1985
- Maggot River (Ontario), former name of the Hewitson River, Ontario, Canada
- "Maggots", a curve on the Silverstone Circuit in Great Britain
- "The Maggots", the nickname of NASA Astronaut Group 10
- Missoula Maggots, an amateur rugby football club

== See also ==
- Apple maggot (Rhagoletis pomonella) or railroad worm, a pest of several fruits, mainly apples
- Rhagoletis mendax or blueberry maggot
- Magot (disambiguation)
