= Nick Newlin =

United States international rugby league player

Personal information
- Full name: Nicholas Newlin
- Born: 1986 or 1987 (age 39–40) Port Washington, Wisconsin, United States
- Height: 6 ft 2 in (188 cm)
- Weight: 238 lb (108 kg)

Playing information
- Position: Prop
Club
Years	Team	Pld	T	G	FG	P
2014–	Atlanta Rhinos
Representative
Years	Team	Pld	T	G	FG	P
2015–17	United States	8	2	0	0	8
- Source: As of October 26, 2017

Nicholas Newlin is an American rugby league player who has represented the United States national team. The captain of the Hawks' domestic-based team, Newlin was named as co-captain of the side for the 2017 World Cup.

== Early life ==
Born and raised in Port Washington, Wisconsin, Newlin played soccer, American football, baseball and basketball as a child. In 2008, Newlin joined the United States Marine Corps and spent four years serving in Afghanistan. He moved to Atlanta, Georgia at the completion of his service, and discovered rugby league in 2014 through the Atlanta Rhinos.

== Playing career ==
In his debut season of rugby league, Newlin was named captain of the Atlanta Rhinos for their inaugural season in the USA Rugby League. He made his debut for the United States national team against Canada in September 2015, and was named captain of the side in July 2016 for their match against Jamaica. For the 2017 World Cup, Newlin was named co-captain alongside professional Mark Offerdahl.

=== International caps ===
#	Date	Opponent	Competition	Scoring
1	September 20, 2015	Canada	2015 Colonial Cup	
2	December 4, 2015	Jamaica	2017 World Cup qualifying	
3	December 12, 2015	Canada	2017 World Cup qualifying	
4	July 23, 2016	Jamaica	2016 Americas Championship	1 try
5	September 24, 2016	Canada	2016 Americas Championship	
6	October 1, 2016	Canada	2016 Colonial Cup	
7	July 22, 2017	Jamaica	2017 Americas Championship	1 try
8	September 16, 2017	Canada	2017 Americas Championship	
