= Casey Clark =

American rugby league player

Personal information
- Born: July 13, 1990 (age 34); Olympia, Washington, U.S.
- Height: 5 ft 11 in (1.80 m)
- Weight: 205 lb (93 kg)

Playing information
- Position: Second-row
Club
Years	Team	Pld	T	G	FG	P
2011	Jacksonville Axemen
2013	Philadelphia Fight
	Total	0	0	0	0	0
Representative
Years	Team	Pld	T	G	FG	P
	USA

Casey Clark (born July 13, 1990) is an American rugby league player for the Philadelphia Fight in the USA Rugby League and previously with the Jacksonville Axemen and the Helensburgh Tigers in Australia. He has also played rugby union with the Missoula Maggots and spent some time in New Zealand and with the USA Rugby 7s. In 2013 he won the national title with Philadelphia Fight, beating his past team Jacksonville Axemen in the final, and was named Most Valuable Player. He is a USA international, and in 2015 helped the team qualify for the 2017 Rugby League World Cup.
