= Joseph Paulo =

US & Samoa international rugby league footballer

Joseph 'Sefa' Paulo
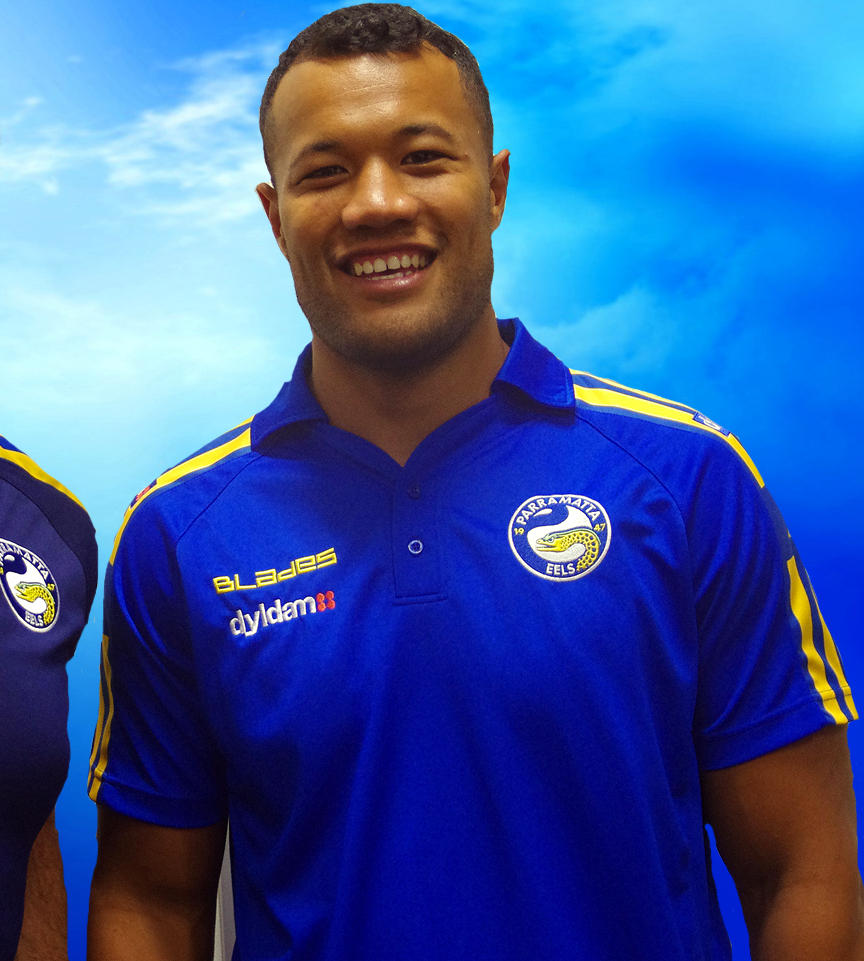

Personal information
- Full name: Joseph Paulo
- Born: 2 January 1988 (age 38) Auckland, New Zealand
- Height: 6 ft 2 in (1.88 m)
- Weight: 16 st 10 lb (106 kg)

Playing information
- Position: Lock, Second-row, Five-eighth
Club
Years	Team	Pld	T	G	FG	P
2008–11	Penrith Panthers	30	4	0	0	16
2011–15	Parramatta Eels	86	2	9	0	26
2016–18	Cronulla Sharks	51	1	0	0	4
2019–20	St Helens	37	1	0	0	4
2021–22	Toulouse Olympique	24	1	0	0	4
2023–	Pia	3	0	0	0	0
	Total	231	9	9	0	54
Representative
Years	Team	Pld	T	G	FG	P
2007–18	Samoa	12	1	15	0	10
2009–17	United States	6	2	16	0	40
2015	NRL All Stars	1	0	0	0	0
2015–17	NSW City	2	0	0	0	0
- Source: As of 4Sep 2022
- Education: Patrician Brothers' College, Blacktown
- Relatives: Junior Paulo (brother)

Joseph Paulo (born 2 January 1988) is a former professional rugby league footballer who last played as a loose forward, second-row and stand-off for Pia in the Elite Two Championship. He has played for both Samoa and the United States at international level.

He previously played for the Penrith Panthers, Parramatta Eels and the Cronulla-Sutherland Sharks in the NRL, and St Helens in the Super League. He has played for the NRL All Stars and New South Wales City sides.

== Early life ==
Paulo was born in Auckland, New Zealand, to an American Samoan mother, Jane, and a Samoan father, Aukuso. He is also of Niuean descent. He was raised in Sydney, New South Wales, Australia and is the younger brother of former professional rugby league footballer, and convicted criminal Junior Paulo.

As such, he is eligible to represent the national teams of Australia, New Zealand, Niue, Samoa, and the United States.

Paulo attended Patrician Brothers' College, Blacktown, and represented the Australian Schoolboys team.

== Playing career ==
=== Penrith Panthers ===
In round 6, against the Cronulla-Sutherland Sharks, Paulo made his NRL debut for the Penrith Panthers, starting at second-row in the 21-20 golden point extra time win at Remondis Stadium. Paulo would go on to play in 8 matches in his debut year, but also played for the Panthers NYC team.

Paulo was named in the Samoan squad for the 2008 Rugby League World Cup.

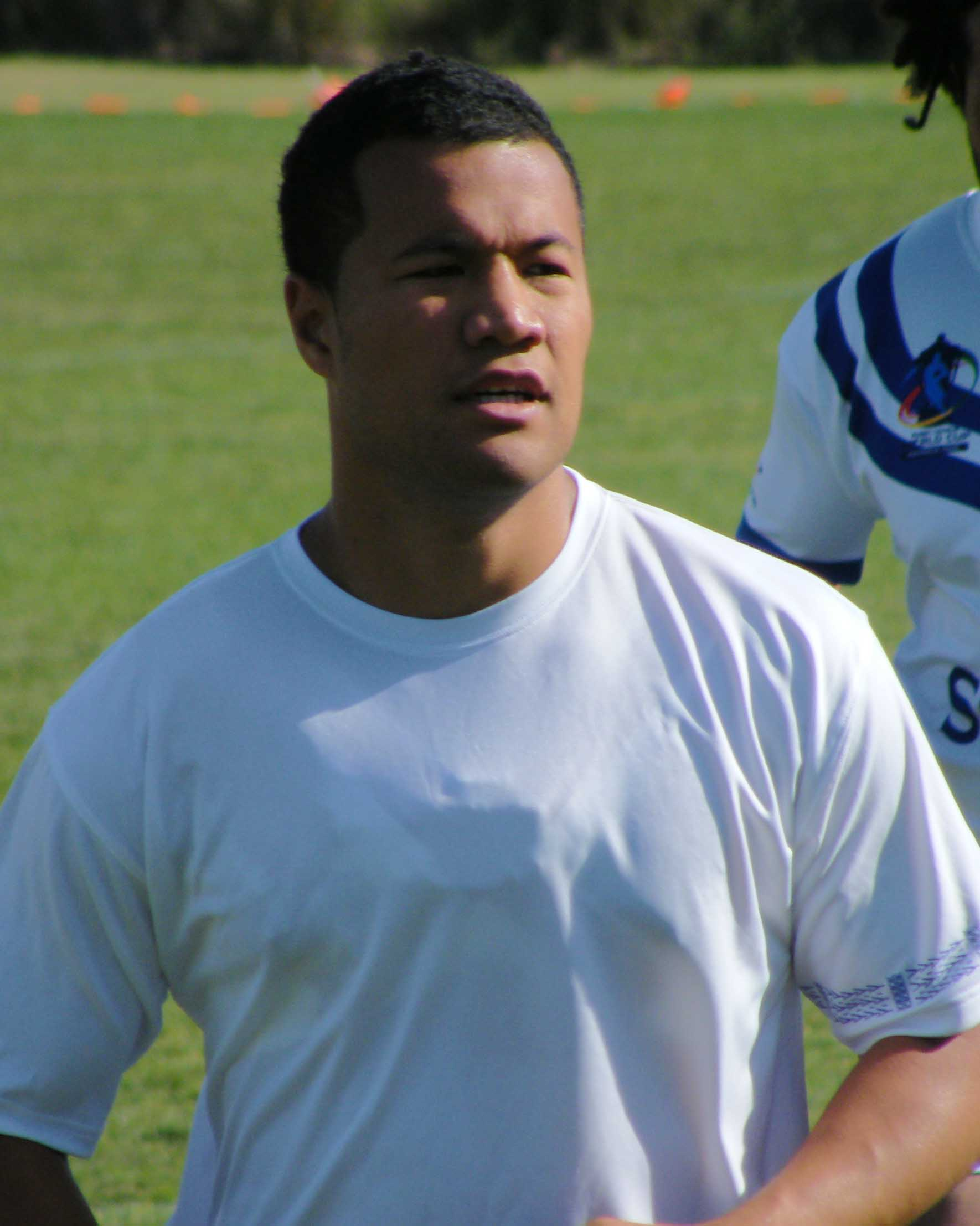
Paulo training with Samoa

In round 17 of the 2009 NRL season, against the Parramatta Eels, Paulo scored his first NRL career try in the Panthers 38-34 win at Penrith Stadium. Paulo finished the season with him playing in 14 matches and scoring 2 tries. He was named as part of the Samoan side for the Pacific Cup. Paulo played at lock in Samoa’s 20-22 defeat by the Cook Islands at Barlow Park.

Paulo finished the 2010 NRL season with him playing in 7 matches for Penrith. Paulo again represented Samoa, playing at five-eighth and kicking a goal in Samoa’s 6-50 loss against New Zealand at Mt Smart Stadium.

Paulo only played in one match for Penrith in 2011, in round 15 against the Newcastle Knights. He instead played for the Windsor Wolves in the New South Wales Cup until he made a mid-year transfer to the Parramatta Eels.

=== Parramatta Eels ===
In round 20 of the 2011 NRL season, against the Canterbury-Bankstown Bulldogs, Paulo made his club debut for Parramatta, coming off the interchange bench in the 8-7 loss at ANZ Stadium. This was Paulo’s only match for the Eels in 2011, and he spent the rest of the year playing for the Wentworthville Magpies in the New South Wales Cup. At the end of the season, Paulo switched his international allegiance to the United States. Paulo played at five-eighth and lock for the Tomahawks in their 2013 World Cup qualifying matches against South Africa and Jamaica, kicking 10 goals in the victories.

On 16 June 2012, Paulo re-signed with the Eels, keeping him at the club until the end of the 2014 NRL season. Paulo finished the season having played a full season of first grade, appearing in 23 matches for the Eels in the 2012 NRL season as the club finished last for the first time since 1972.

In round 9 of 2013, against the Brisbane Broncos, Paulo scored his first club try for the Eels in the 19-18 win at Parramatta Stadium. Paulo finished the 2013 NRL season having played in all of the Eels 24 matches, scoring a try and kicking 6 goals as the club finished last on the table for a second consecutive year.

Paulo captained the United States national rugby league team in the 2013 Rugby League World Cup, playing at five-eighth, scoring 2 tries and kicking 6 goals in their campaign, in which they reached the quarter finals.

In round 24 of 2014, against the Manly-Warringah Sea Eagles, Paulo played his 100th NRL career match in the Eels 22-12 win at Parramatta Stadium. Paulo finished the 2014 NRL season with him playing in all of the Eels 24 matches, scoring a try and kicking 3 goals. On 30 October 2014, Paulo extended his contract with the Eels to the end of the 2016 NRL season after rejecting offers from the Canberra Raiders.

On 13 February 2015, Paulo was selected on the interchange bench for NRL All Stars to play against the Indigenous All Stars in the 2015 All Stars match at Cbus Super Stadium. The NRL All Stars lost 20-6. On 3 May 2015, Paulo played for New South Wales City Origin against New South Wales Country Origin, coming off the interchange bench in the 34-22 loss in Wagga Wagga. After the City vs. Country clash, Paulo was axed to the Wentworthville Magpies due to bad form. Paulo finished the 2015 NRL season having played in 14 matches for the Eels. On 2 November, Paulo was released from the final year of his Eels contract to sign a two-year contract with the Cronulla-Sutherland Sharks starting in 2016.

=== Cronulla-Sutherland Sharks ===
On 28 January 2016, Paulo was named in the Sharks 2016 Auckland Nines squad. In round 2 of the 2016 NRL season, Paulo made his club debut for the Cronulla-Sutherland Sharks against the St George Illawarra Dragons, starting at lock in the Sharks 30-2 win at Southern Cross Group Stadium.

Paulo made 10 appearances for Cronulla in the 2017 NRL season but spent the majority of his playing time with Cronulla's feeder club, the Newtown Jets, in the New South Wales Cup. In 2018, Paulo made 21 appearances for Cronulla as the club reached the preliminary final but fell short of a grand final appearance losing to Melbourne 22-6. This would prove to be Paulo's final game with the club as the player had announced earlier in the season that he was to join St Helens in 2019.

=== St Helens ===
He played in the 2019 Challenge Cup Final defeat by the Warrington Wolves at Wembley Stadium.

Paulo did not feature for St. Helens in their 2019 & 2020 Grand Final victories.

=== Toulouse Olympique ===
It was announced on 10 November 2020 that Paulo would leave St. Helens and had signed for Toulouse Olympique, playing in the RFL Championship, from the 2021 season on a two-year deal.

On 10 October 2021, Paulo played for Toulouse in their victory over Featherstone in the Million Pound Game which saw the club promoted to the Super League for the first time in their history.

== International caps ==
For Samoa
Cap	Date	Venue	Opponent	Competition	T	G	FG	Points
1	9 November 2007	Lowerhouse Lane, Widnes	United States	2008 World Cup qualifying	0	5/8	0	10
2	9 November 2007	Post Office Road, Featherstone	Lebanon	2008 World Cup qualifying	0	7/8	0	14
3	31 October 2008	Penrith Stadium, Sydney	Tonga	2008 World Cup	0	0	0	0
4	5 November 2008	Parramatta Stadium, Sydney	Ireland	2008 World Cup	0	0	0	0
5	9 November 2008	Penrith Stadium, Sydney	France	2008 World Cup	0	2/2	0	4
6	17 October 2009	Barlow Park, Cairns	Cook Islands	2009 Pacific Cup qualifier	0	0	0	0
7	16 October 2010	Mount Smart Stadium, Auckland	New Zealand		0	1/1	0	2
8	24 October 2010	Parramatta Stadium, Sydney	Tonga		0	0	0	0
9	28 October 2017	Mount Smart Stadium, Auckland	New Zealand	2017 World Cup	1	0	0	4
10	11 November 2017	Barlow Park, Cairns	Scotland	2017 World Cup	0	0	0	0
11	17 November 2017	Marrara Oval, Darwin	Australia	2017 World Cup	0	0	0	0

For United States
Cap	Date	Venue	Opponent	Competition	T	G	FG	Points
1	15 October 2011	Campbell's Field, Camden	South Africa	2013 World Cup qualifying	0	4/8	0	8
2	23 October 2011	Campbell's Field, Camden	Jamaica	2013 World Cup qualifying	0	6/9	0	12
3	30 October 2013	Memorial Stadium, Bristol	Cook Islands	2013 World Cup	1	4/8	0	12
4	3 November 2013	Racecourse Ground, Wrexham	Wales	2013 World Cup	1	2/5	0	8
5	7 November 2013	Salford City Stadium, Salford	Scotland	2013 World Cup	0	0/2	0	0
6	16 November 2013	Racecourse Ground, Wrexham	Australia	2013 World Cup	0	0	0	0
