= Camden Riversharks =

- 2001–2015; Camden, New Jersey
Team logo
Cap insignia

Minor league affiliations
- Class: Independent (2001–2015)
- League: Atlantic League (2001–2015)

Minor league titles
- Division titles (3): 2003; 2004; 2005

Team data
- Name: Camden Riversharks (2001–2015)
- Colors: Dark blue, light blue, gray, white
- Ballpark: Campbell's Field (2001–2015)

The Camden Riversharks were an American professional baseball team based in Camden, New Jersey, from 2001 to 2015. They were a member of the Liberty Division of the Atlantic League of Professional Baseball, then unaffiliated with Major League Baseball. The Riversharks played their home games at Campbell's Field, which was situated at the base of the Benjamin Franklin Bridge. Due to its location on the Delaware River, the ballpark offered a clear view of the Philadelphia skyline. The "Riversharks" name referred to the location of Camden on the Delaware River, and the primary logo incorporated the Benjamin Franklin Bridge that links Camden to Philadelphia.

On October 21, 2015, the Camden Riversharks announced they would cease operations immediately due to the inability to reach an agreement on lease terms with the owner of Campbell's Field, the Camden County Improvement Authority (the authority had purchased Campbell's Field from Rutgers University two months prior).

The Riversharks were replaced by the New Britain Bees, a separate franchise for the 2016 season.

== History of Camden baseball ==
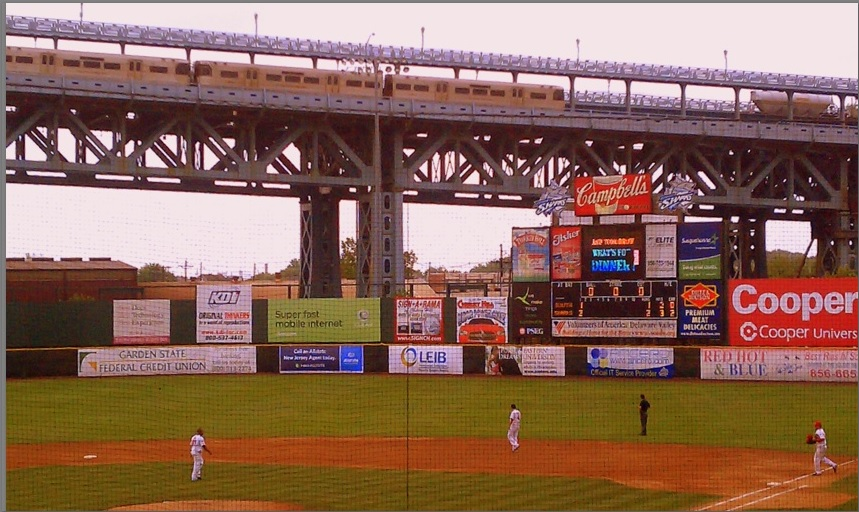
Camden Riversharks game in 2009. A PATCO train crossing the Ben Franklin Bridge

The Riversharks were not the first baseball team to call Camden home. The Camden Merritt, named for former state senator Albert Merritt, of the Interstate Association played there in 1883, and disbanded the same year. Another team from the Tri-State League played in Camden in 1904, and they too disbanded, during the season. The inception of the Riversharks in 2001 was the first professional baseball team in Camden since the 1904 season.

== Logos and uniforms ==
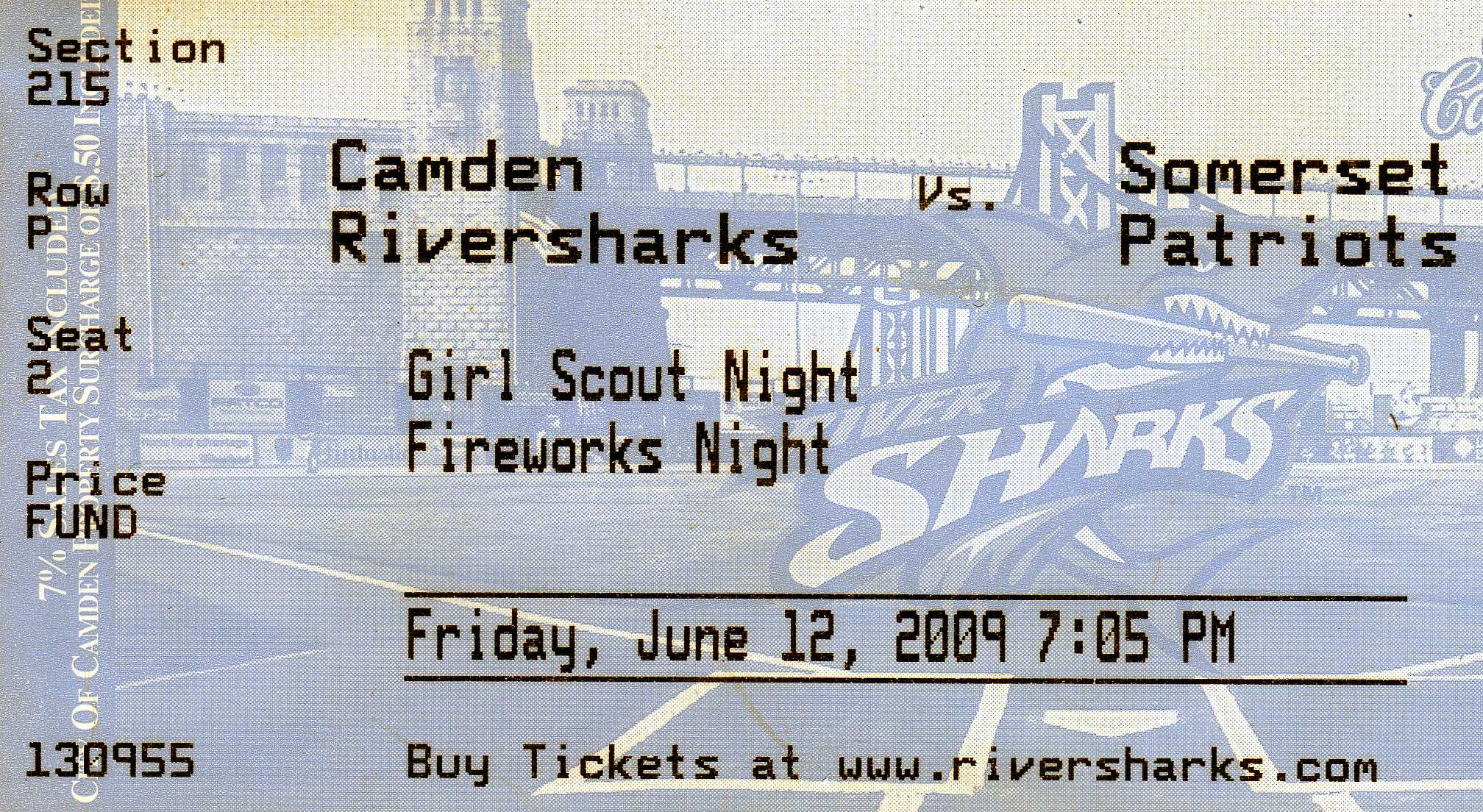
Ticket stub for Camden-Somerset game of June 12, 2009

The team colors of the Camden Riversharks were navy blue, Columbia blue, and white. The Riversharks' last logo, introduced in 2005 with a new ownership group, consisted of a shark biting a baseball bat superimposed over a stylized depiction of the Benjamin Franklin Bridge. The Riversharks' former logo, used from 2001 to 2005, consisted of a navy blue ring with a shark centered above the wordmark superimposed over it.

The Riversharks' primary caps were navy blue with a Columbia blue visor and the "shark-fin" cap logo centered on the front. The home jerseys were white with navy blue piping and feature the "Sharks" wordmark across the front in white with navy blue and Columbia blue outline. The away jerseys were gray with the "Camden" wordmark centered across the jersey in navy blue with Columbia blue outline.

== Season-by-season records ==
Camden Riversharks - 2001 to 2015
Season	W - L Record	Winning Percentage	Finish	Playoffs
2001	49–77	.389	3rd in South Division	Did not qualify for the playoffs
2002	71–54	.568	2nd in South Division	1–2 (lost division final)
2003	78–48	.619	1st in South Division	0–2 (lost division final)
2004	76–49	.608	1st in South Division	0–3 (lost league championship)
2005	80–60	.571	1st in South Division	Did not qualify for the playoffs
2006	61–65	.484	4th in South Division	Did not qualify for the playoffs
2007	67–59	.532	2nd in South Division	1–2 (lost division final)
2008	67–73	.479	3rd in Liberty Division	1–3 (lost league championship)
2009	62–78	.443	4th in Liberty Division	Did not qualify for the playoffs
2010	62–77	.446	4th in Liberty Division	Did not qualify for the playoffs
2011	57–67	.460	4th in Liberty Division	Did not qualify for the playoffs
2012	62–77	.446	4th in Liberty Division	Did not qualify for the playoffs
2013	54–86	.386	4th in Liberty Division	Did not qualify for the playoffs
2014	43–80	.350	3rd in Liberty Division	Did not qualify for the playoffs
2015	56–83	.403	Tied for 3rd with Bridgeport	Did not qualify for the playoffs
Totals (2001–2015)	945–1033	.477	-	7–12

== Retired numbers ==
42 (Jackie Robinson)
Second baseman, Retired throughout professional baseball on April 15, 1997

16 (Brad Strauss)
1B / 3B / OF / DH, Retired by the Riversharks on August 12, 2007

== Notable alumni ==
- Kim Batiste
- Danny Bautista
- Alberto Castillo
- Jason Conti
- Mike Costanzo
- Ben Davis
- Stephen Drew
- Pedro Feliz
- Brian Lawrence
- José Lima
- Blaine Neal
- Craig Paquette
- Valentino Pascucci
- René Rivera
- Félix Rodríguez
- Ted Silva
- Josh Towers
- Wilson Valdez
- Jered Weaver
- Delwyn Young

Achievements
Preceded by Newark Bears; North Division; 2007	Liberty Division Champions; Camden Riversharks; 2008	Succeeded by Southern Maryland Blue Crabs; 2009
Preceded by Somerset Patriots; 2003	South Division Champions; Camden Riversharks; 2004	Succeeded by Somerset Patriots; 2005
