= Anthony Farrell =

English RL coach and former England & Wales international rugby league footballer

Personal information
- Full name: Anthony Lloyd Farrell
- Born: 17 January 1969 (age 57) Huddersfield, England

Playing information
- Position: second-row, prop
Club
Years	Team	Pld	T	G	FG	P
1985–90	Huddersfield	69	12	3	0	56
1990–96	Sheffield Eagles	159	35	0	0	140
1997–01	Leeds Rhinos	146	23	0	0	92
2002–03	Widnes Vikings	51	5	1	0	22
2004	Halifax	28	3	0	0	12
	Total	453	78	4	0	322
Representative
Years	Team	Pld	T	G	FG	P
1995–99	England	3	0	0	0	0
2000–03	Wales	5	1	0	0	4
2002	Yorkshire	2	0	0	0	0

Coaching information
Club
Years	Team	Gms	W	D	L	W%
2004–06	Halifax RLFC	67	36	0	31	54
- Relatives: Joel Farrell (son); Izaac Farrell (son)

Anthony Lloyd Farrell (born 17 January 1969) is an English former professional rugby league footballer. He played at representative level for England, Wales, and at club level for the Huddersfield Giants, Sheffield Eagles, Leeds Rhinos, Widnes Vikings and Halifax, as a prop or second-row forward.

== Background ==
Farrell was born in Huddersfield, West Riding of Yorkshire, England. He is of Jamaican and Welsh descent.

== Playing career ==
Farrell played for Leeds Rhinos at second-row in their 1998 Super League Grand Final defeat by the Wigan Warriors. Whilst in his first year at Halifax the sacking of Tony Anderson opened a new career for "Faz" as he was asked to become temporary coach until the end of the year. After saving the club from relegation the following season Farrell took the club within a whisker of a place in the grand final. Losing out to Castleford Tigers. The year after was less successful for Farrell though, after a poor series of results including a club record defeat by Hull Kingston Rovers, "Faz" eventually lost his job.
