= Daniel Howard (rugby league) =

American international rugby league player

Danny Howard
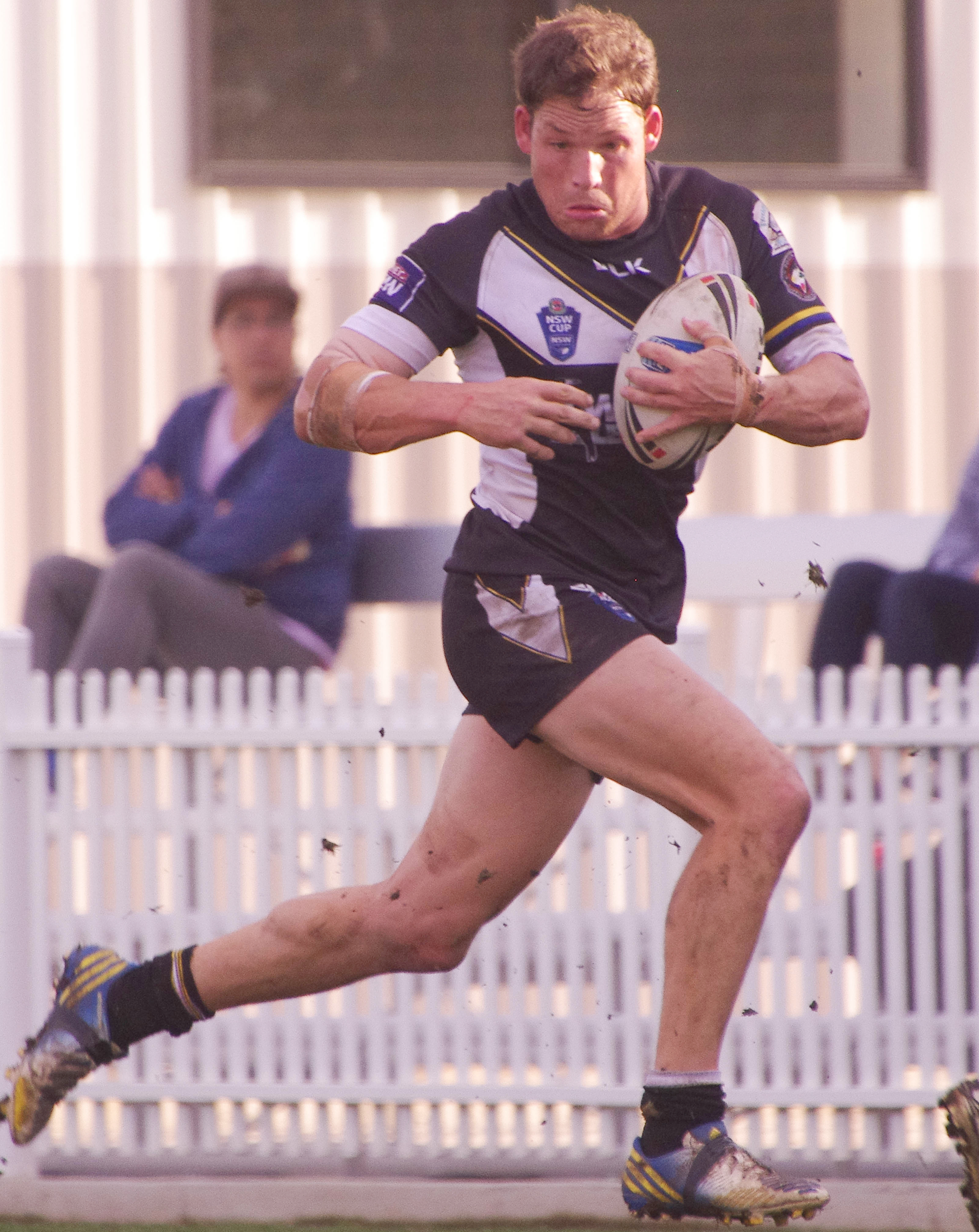

Personal information
- Full name: Daniel Howard
- Born: December 13, 1984 (age 40); Los Angeles, California, United States
- Height: 6 ft 2 in (187 cm)
- Weight: 216 lb (98 kg)

Playing information
- Position: Prop, Second-row
Representative
Years	Team	Pld	T	G	FG	P
2011–18	United States	8	6	0	0	24
2019–	United States 9s	3	0	0	0	0
- Source: As of October 19, 2019
- Relatives: Stephen Howard (brother)

Daniel Howard (born December 13, 1984) is a rugby league player who plays for the Wentworthville Magpies in the Intrust Super Premiership. He also plays for the United States national rugby league team, where he was named in the 2013 Rugby League World Cup qualifying squad.

Daniel Howard's position of choice is a prop or a second-row.

== Background ==
Howard was born in Los Angeles, California, United States. He is the brother of fellow U.S. international Steve Howard. In 2015, Daniel played for the United States in their 2017 Rugby League World Cup qualifiers.
