= Hans du Plessis =

Hans du Plessis is a South African rugby league player for the Tuks Bulls. His position is centre. He is a South African international, and has played in the 2013 Rugby League World Cup qualifying against Jamaica and the USA.
