= Junior Paulo (rugby league, born 1983) =

US international rugby league footballer

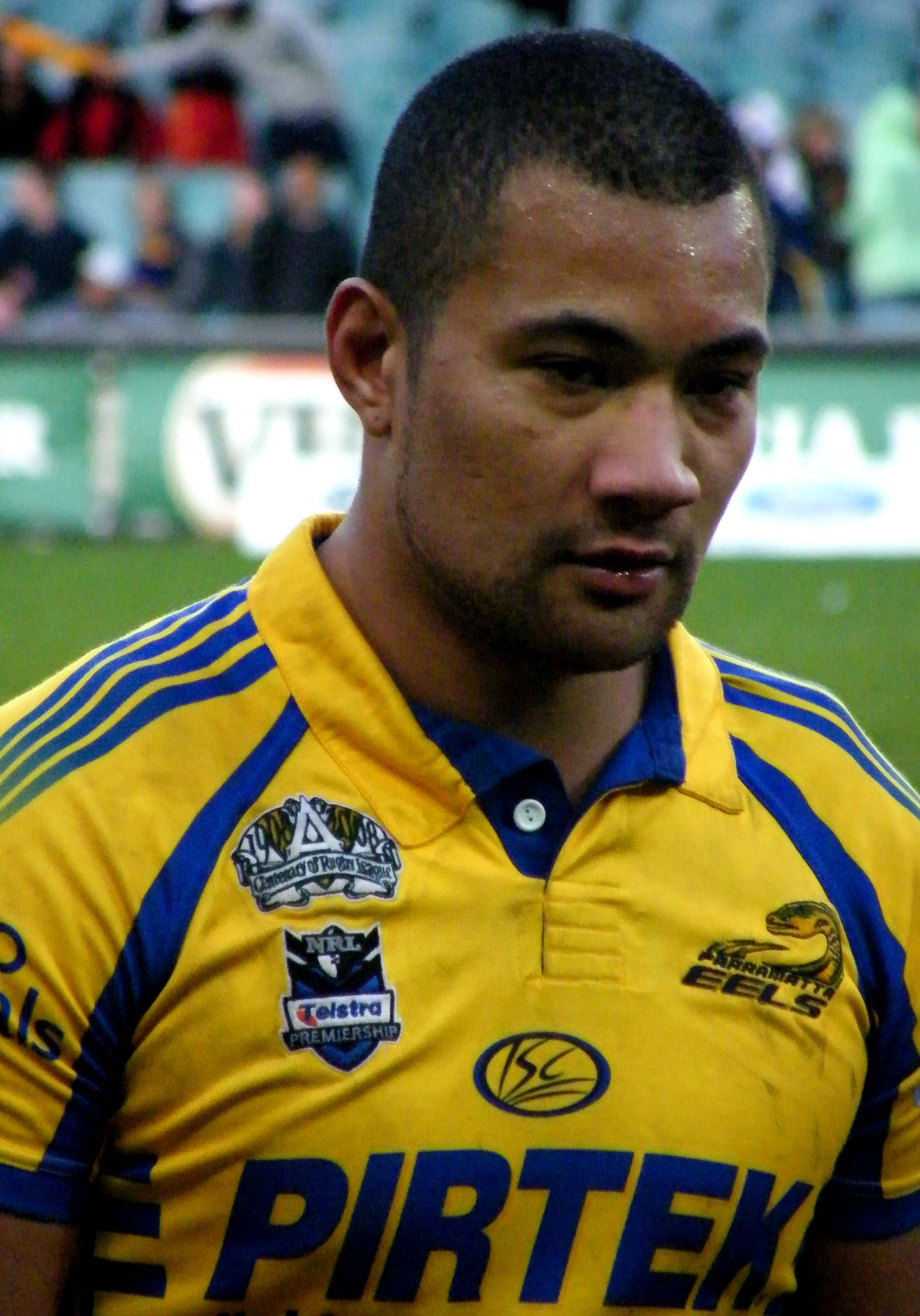

Personal information
- Full name: Aukuso Junior Paulo
- Born: 8 September 1983 (age 42) Auckland, New Zealand

Playing information
- Height: 194 cm (6 ft 4 in)
- Weight: 120 kg (18 st 13 lb)
- Position: Prop, Second-row
Club
Years	Team	Pld	T	G	FG	P
2007–09	Parramatta Eels	17	0	0	0	0
Representative
Years	Team	Pld	T	G	FG	P
2011–13	United States	3	0	0	0	0
- Relatives: Joseph Paulo (brother)

Aukuso Junior Paulo (born 8 September 1983) is a New Zealand-born former United States national rugby league team player and a prop and second-row forward for the Parramatta Eels in the National Rugby League. He is currently serving a prison sentence in Australia after attempting to sell a large amount of cocaine.

== Background ==
Paulo was born in Auckland, New Zealand, of American Samoan descent. He was one of the Australian Schoolboys.

== Playing career ==
After spending time in the semi-professional and professional reserve grade competitions in New South Wales, Paulo signed with the Parramatta Eels in the National Rugby League (NRL) for the 2007 season. He made his first grade debut for Parramatta in round 10 of the 2007 NRL season against North Queensland which ended in a 44–14 victory at Parramatta Stadium.

In the same year, he played in Parramatta's reserve grade premiership winning team as they defeated North Sydney 20–15 at Telstra Stadium.

He was named to the Samoa training squad for the 2008 Rugby League World Cup, He signed with the St George Illawarra Dragons for the 2010 NRL season, and with the Penrith Panthers for the 2011 NRL season. In 2011 he was named in the United States national team for the 2013 Rugby League World Cup Qualifiers.

== Crime ==
In December 2017, Paulo and fellow former Eels player Royce Hura were arrested in a police operation in Sydney's Centennial Park. In Waverley Local Court, they faced five charges, including possession of two unauthorised semiautomatic pistols, $649,990 in cash proceeds from crime and participation in a criminal group.

On 10 August 2020, Paulo was sentenced to a minimum of eleven years in prison after attempting to supply Sydney with cocaine with a potential commercial value of $180 million.
