= Ross Peltier =

Jamaica international rugby league footballer

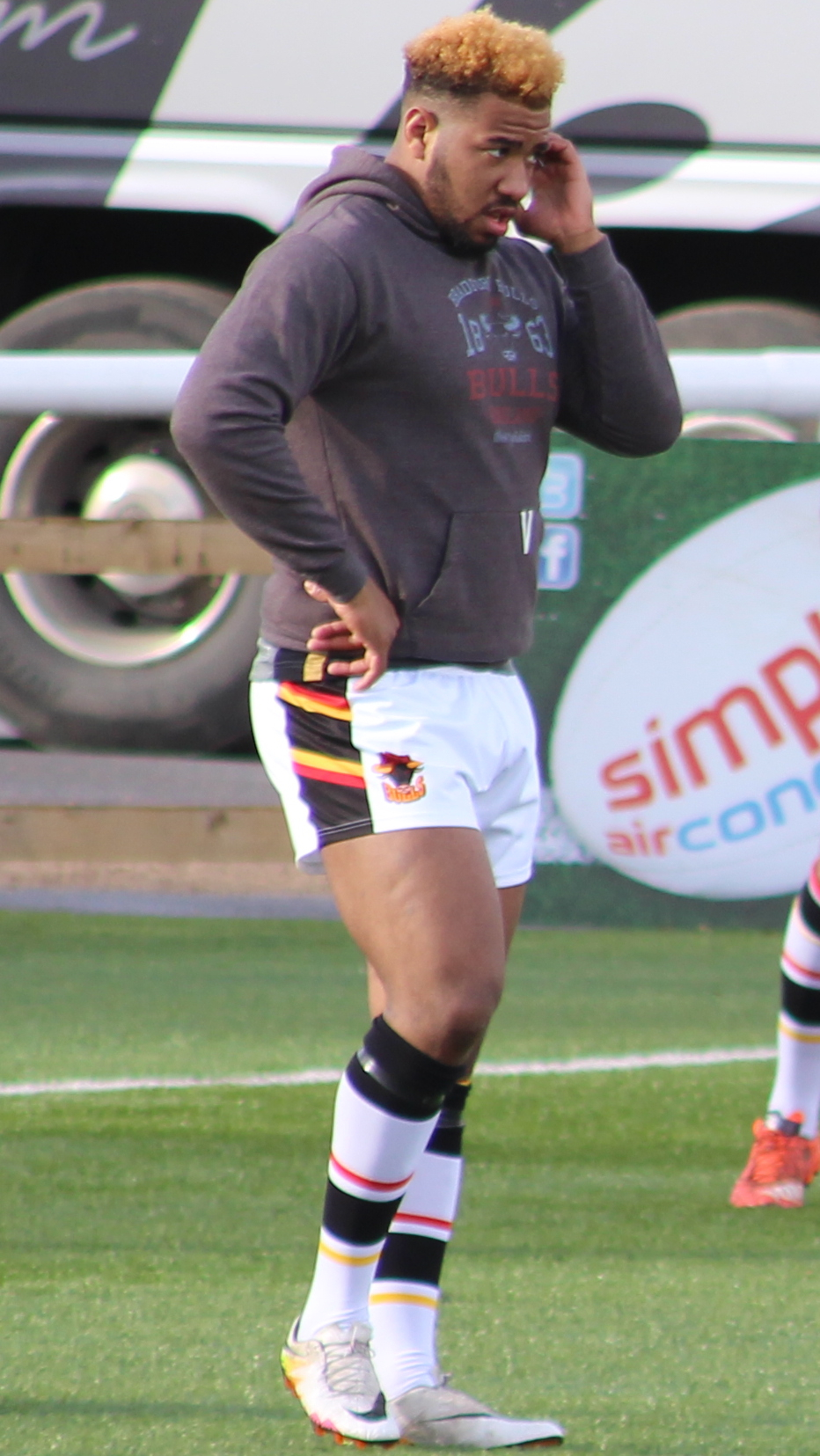

Personal information
- Born: 24 April 1992 (age 34) Bradford, West Yorkshire, England
- Height: 6 ft 3 in (1.91 m)
- Weight: 17 st 2 lb (109 kg)

Playing information
- Position: Prop
Club
| Years | Team | Pld | T | G | FG | P |
|---|---|---|---|---|---|---|
| 2013–16 | Keighley Cougars | 37 | 10 | 0 | 0 | 40 |
| 2017–19 | Bradford Bulls | 64 | 19 | 0 | 0 | 76 |
| 2020–21 | Doncaster | 18 | 5 | 0 | 0 | 20 |
| 2022 | Dewsbury Rams | 9 | 1 | 0 | 0 | 4 |
| 2022 | → Hunslet (loan) | 3 | 0 | 0 | 0 | 0 |
| | Total | 131 | 35 | 0 | 0 | 140 |
Representative
| Years | Team | Pld | T | G | FG | P |
| 2011–22 | Jamaica | 11 | 3 | 0 | 0 | 12 |
- Source: As of 1 December 2022

Ross Peltier (born 24 April 1992) is a former Jamaican International Rugby League player who played as a prop. He is a Politician for the Green Party.

He is a Green Party politician.

== Background ==
Peltier was born in Bradford, West Yorkshire, England.

== Playing career ==
=== Bradford ===
Following a stint at the Keighley, Peltier signed with Bradford on a two-year deal beginning in the 2017 season.

2017 - 2017 Season

Peltier featured in the pre-season friendlies against Huddersfield and Keighley.

Peltier featured in Round 1 (Hull Kingston Rovers) to Round 2 (Rochdale Hornets) then in Round 6 (Batley). He was injured for Rounds 7-13. He played in Round 14 (London Broncos) to Round 20 (Halifax) then in Round 23 (Swinton Lions). He featured in the Championship Shield Game 1 (Toulouse Olympique) to Game 7 (Rochdale Hornets). Peltier also played in the 2017 Challenge Cup in Round 4 (Featherstone Rovers). At the end of the season Peltier signed a two-year extension with the Bradford club.

2018 - 2018 Season

Peltier featured in the pre-season friendlies against Halifax RLFC, Sheffield Eagles, Toronto Wolfpack and Keighley.

He featured in Round 1 (York City) to Round 6 (Workington Town) then in Round 8 (Doncaster R.L.F.C.) to Round 21 (North Wales Crusaders). He also played in Round 23 (Keighley Cougars) to Final (Workington Town). Peltier played in the 2018 Challenge Cup in Round 3 (West Wales Raiders) to Round 5 (Warrington).

2019 - 2019 Season

Peltier featured in Round 10 (Halifax R.L.F.C.) to Round 11 (Barrow) then in Round 13 (Toronto Wolfpack). Ross played in Round 16 (Batley) to Round 22 (York City) then in Round 25 (Dewsbury Rams) to Round 27 (Rochdale Hornets). Peltier played in the 2019 Challenge Cup in Round 5 (Featherstone Rovers) to Quarter Final (Halifax R.L.F.C.). Following financial troubles at Bradford, Peltier signed for Doncaster R.L.F.C.

=== Dewsbury Rams ===
On 15 October 2021, it was reported that he had signed for Dewsbury in the RFL Championship.

=== Statistics ===
Statistics do not include pre-season friendlies.

| Season | Appearance | Tries | Goals | F/G | Points |
|---|---|---|---|---|---|
| 2017 Bradford Bulls | 19 | 4 | 0 | 0 | 16 |
| 2018 Bradford Bulls | 29 | 11 | 0 | 0 | 44 |
| 2019 Bradford Bulls | 16 | 4 | 0 | 0 | 16 |
| Total | 64 | 19 | 0 | 0 | 76 |

=== International career ===
Peltier made his international début for Jamaica in 2011, during the 2013 Rugby League World Cup qualifiers. He featured off the bench in the 20-4 win against South Africa and the 4-40 loss against the United States.

Peltier featured in the 2017 Rugby League World Cup qualifiers. He started at prop in the 14-20 defeat by the United States. He scored two tries against the United States. Peltier also started in the 18-all draw with Canada, this draw meant that Jamaica could not qualify for the World Cup.

In 2016 Peltier featured in the record 68-16 win against Ireland, this victory is the biggest win to date for the Jamaican side. Peltier scored against Ireland. He also featured in the 16-all draw against Wales.

Peltier also featured in the test match against France in a warm up before the 2017 Rugby League World Cup.

== Political career ==
On 2 June 2021, Peltier was selected to be the Green Party candidate for the 2021 Batley and Spen by-election. However, the party later deselected him as a candidate after it was revealed he sent offensive tweets when he was 19.
