= Sione Taufa =

US international rugby league player

Sione Taufa is an American rugby league player for the Maui Rugby Club in Hawaii. His regular position is wing.

He previously played for University in the Waikato Rugby Union Lion Cup.

== Representative career ==
He has represented the USA in the Atlantic Cup and on the USA 7s Rugby team.
