= Izaac Farrell =

Jamaica & Scotland international rugby league footballer

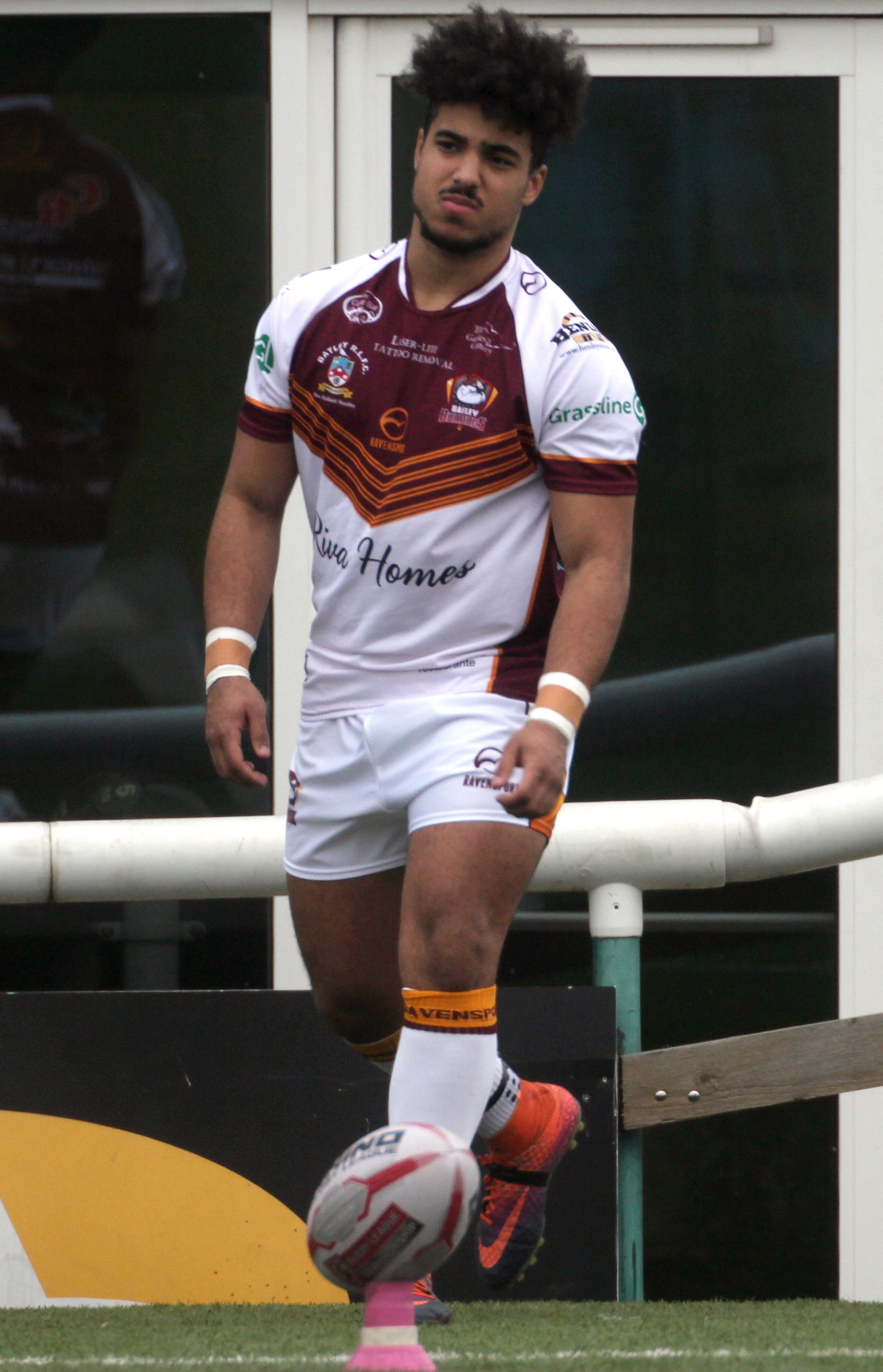

Personal information
- Born: 30 January 1998 (age 28) Huddersfield, West Yorkshire, England
- Height: 5 ft 7 in (1.70 m)
- Weight: 13 st 12 lb (88 kg)

Playing information
- Position: Scrum-half, Stand-off
Club
Years	Team	Pld	T	G	FG	P
2017–19	Huddersfield Giants	3	0	8	0	16
2017(loan)	→ Swinton Lions	3	0	1	0	2
2018(loan)	→ Batley Bulldogs	10	2	20	1	49
2019(loan)	→ Workington Town	5	0	7	0	14
2019	Rochdale Hornets	12	1	0	0	4
2020–24	Sheffield Eagles	21	5	61	2	140
2024(loan)	→ Midlands Hurricanes	2	0	5	0	10
2024(loan)	→ Keighley Cougars	2	2	0	0	8
2025–	Keighley Cougars	0	0	0	0	0
	Total	58	10	102	3	243
Representative
Years	Team	Pld	T	G	FG	P
2021	Jamaica	1	0	3	0	6
2024	Scotland	1	0	0	0	0
- Source: As of 31 October 2024
- Father: Anthony Farrell
- Relatives: Joel Farrell (brother)

Izaac Farrell (born 30 January 1998) is a professional rugby league footballer who plays as a scrum-half for Keighley Cougars in the RFL League 1. Izaac is a product of Huddersfield Giants' academy system and is the son of former Huddersfield, Sheffield, and Leeds player Anthony Farrell and the brother of current Sheffield Eagles player Joel Farrell

== Playing career ==
=== Huddersfield Giants ===
In 2017 he made his Challenge Cup début for the Huddersfield Giants against the Swinton Lions.

=== Batley Bulldogs ===
In 2018 he joined the Batley Bulldogs in the Championship on a season long loan.

He made his Super League debut for the Giants in February 2019.

=== Sheffield Eagles ===
In 2020, Farrell joined his brother Joel at Sheffield Eagles.

=== Keighley Cougars ===
Farrell made two appearances on loan for Keighley Cougars in the RFL League 1 on loan during the 2024 season On 15 October 2024 he signed for a two-year deal with the club.

== International ==
=== Scotland ===
He made his debut for Scotland in the defeat to Ireland in October 2024 at Gateshead.

== Personal life ==
Born in England, Farrell is of Jamaican, Trinidadian and Scottish descent.
