= Mark Offerdahl =

United States international rugby league footballer and coach

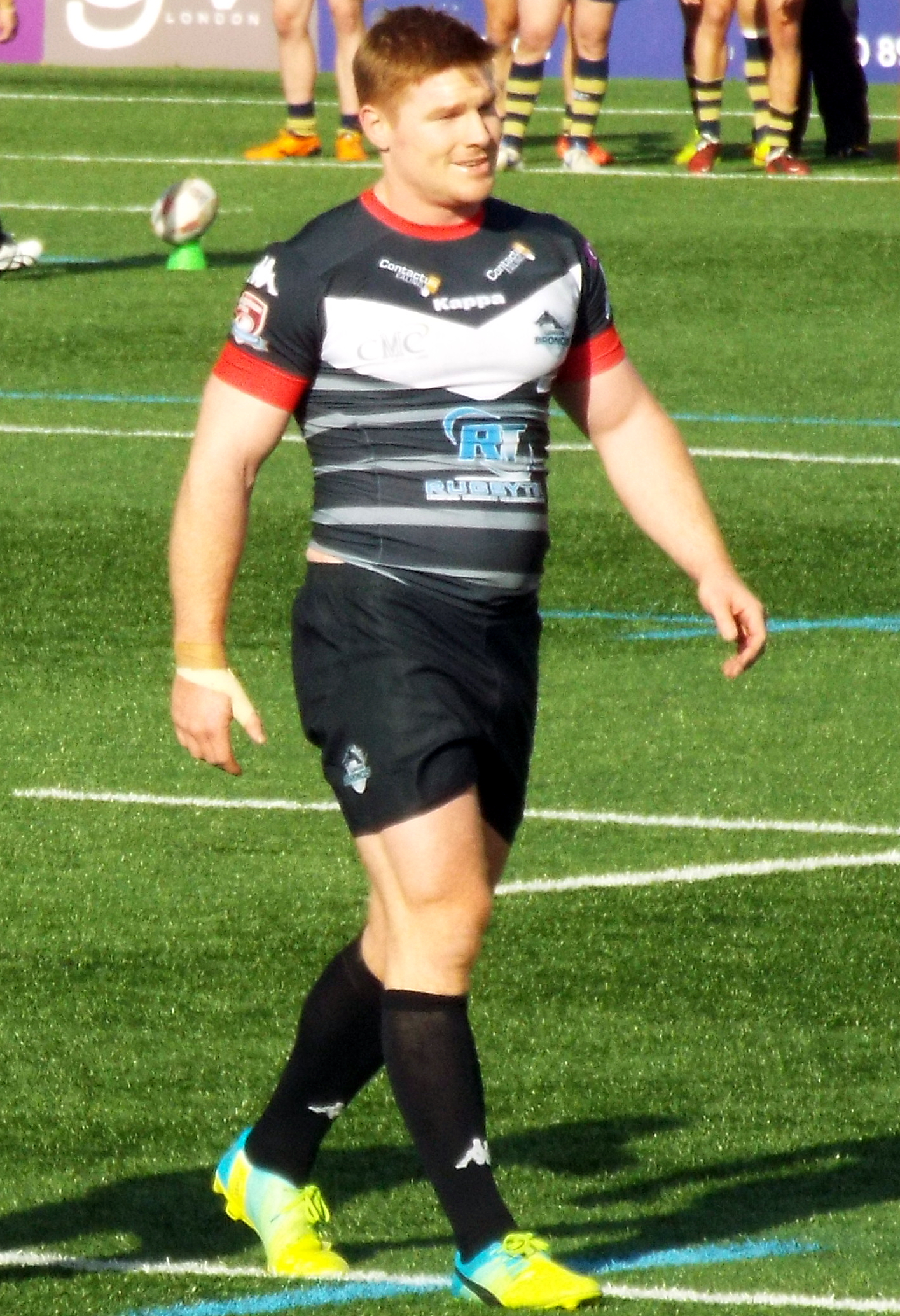

Personal information
- Full name: Mark Joseph Emild Offerdahl
- Born: 15 October 1987 (age 38) Goondiwindi, Queensland, Australia
- Height: 182 cm (6 ft 0 in)
- Weight: 105 kg (16 st 7 lb)

Playing information
- Position: Prop, Second-row, Lock
Club
Years	Team	Pld	T	G	FG	P
2011–13	AS Carcassonne	22	11	0	0	44
2014	North Wales Crusaders	14	5	0	0	20
2015	Connecticut Wildcats
2016–17	London Broncos	39	5	0	0	20
2016(loan)	→ Oxford	1	0	0	0	0
2018	Sheffield Eagles	29	2	0	0	8
2021–	New York Freedom	0	0	0	0	0
	Total	105	23	0	0	92
Representative
Years	Team	Pld	T	G	FG	P
2011–17	United States	28	4	0	0	16
2019–	United States 9s	3	0	0	0	0

Coaching information
Club
Years	Team	Gms	W	D	L	W%
2021–	New York Freedom	0	0	0	0
- Source: As of 13 May 2021

Mark Offerdahl (born 15 October 1987) is a United States international rugby league footballer who plays for and coaches his hometown club the Goondiwindi Boars in Australia. Primarily playing as a prop, he can also play as a second-row or lock. He was a member of the USA squad for both the 2013 and 2017 World Cups. He has previously played for AS Carcassonne, in France, North Wales Crusaders, in Wales, and London Broncos, Oxford and Sheffield Eagles, in England.

Offerdahl is known as 'Captain America' because of his position as captain of the USA International team.

== Background ==
Offerdahl was born in Goondiwindi, Queensland, Australia, and is of American descent through his father, a native of Madison, Wisconsin who served in the United States Army.

== Playing career ==
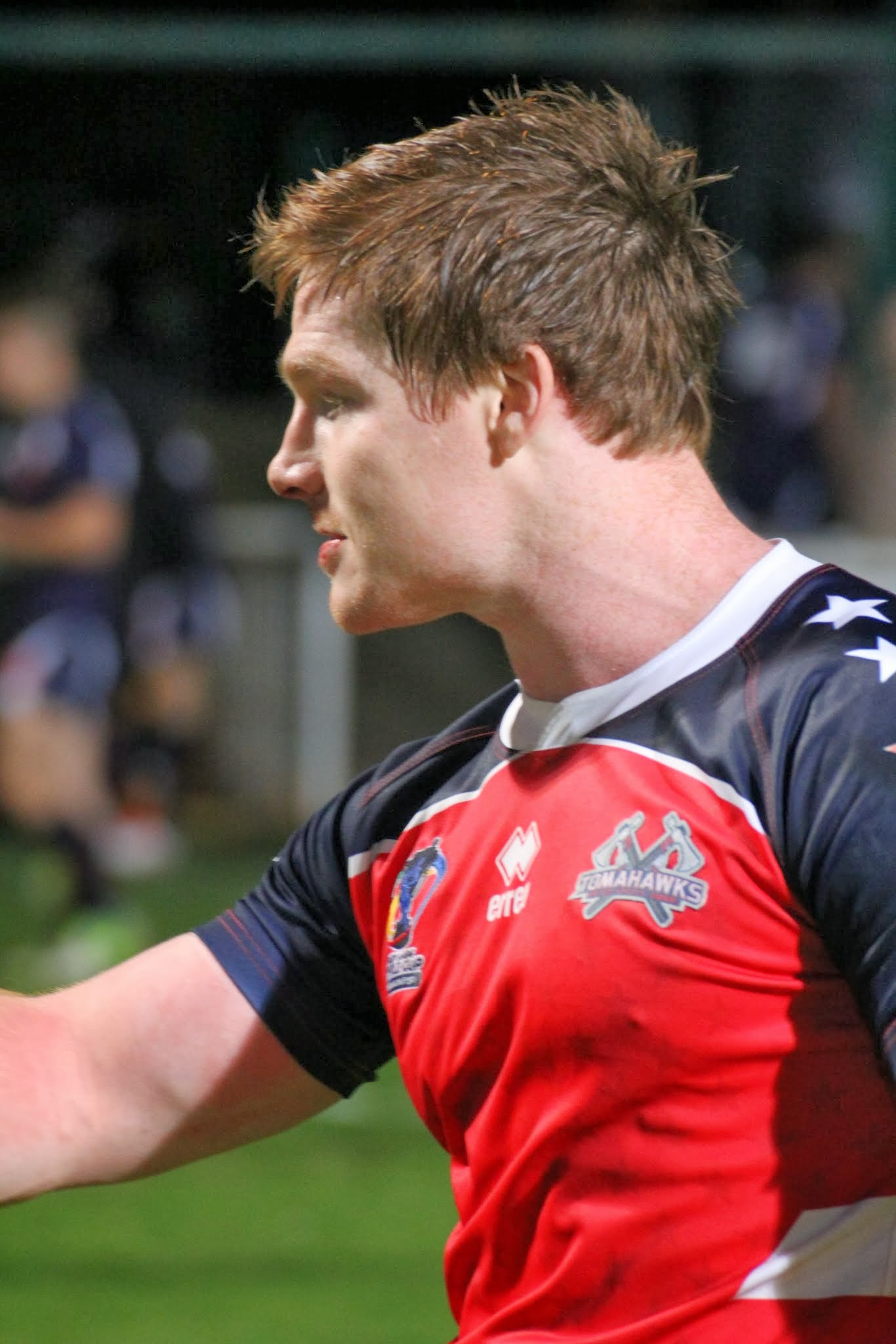
Offerdahl playing for the USA

=== Early career ===
Offerdahl played his junior rugby league for Goondiwindi in the Toowoomba Rugby League. He played for the Manly Sea Eagles at a junior level, and also spent time with the Easts Tigers in the Queensland Cup, AS Carcassonne in the French Elite One Championship, and the Connecticut Wildcats in the AMNRL.

=== Club career ===
Following the 2013 World Cup, Offerdahl signed with the recently promoted Championship side North Wales Crusaders. He left the club mid-season to join the Illawarra Cutters in the New South Wales Cup.

On 11 August 2014, Offerdahl signed with the Bradford Bulls in the Championship for the 2015 season, but did not join the club due to recurring injuries.

Offerdahl signed a two-year contract with London Broncos in the Championship on 23 July 2015. The front-rower made nearly 40 appearances for the Broncos and scored 5 tries in his two years with the club. During his time in London, Offerdahl was sent on loan to Oxford, Here, he played in just one game; a 32-12 win against Hemel Stags.

On finishing his two-year contract with Broncos, Offerdahl signed a one-year deal with fellow Championship outfit the Sheffield Eagles. He became their eighth permanent signing and first of 2018, ahead of the upcoming season.

Having played nearly 30 games that season, Offerdahl returned home to play for and coach the Goondiwindi Boars in the TRL.

=== International career ===
In October 2011, Offerdahl was selected to represent the United States in their 2013 World Cup qualifying matches against South Africa and Jamaica, scoring a try against Jamaica.

In 2013, Offerdahl was named in the US squad for the 2013 World Cup. He played in their three group matches against the Cook Islands, Wales and Scotland, along with their semi-final against Australia. He scored a try against the Cook Islands.

In December 2015, Offerdahl captained the United States in their 2017 World Cup qualifying matches against Jamaica and Canada, scoring a try against Jamaica.

On 24 September 2017, Offerdahl was named in the United States' squad for the 2017 World Cup. He was named captain of the side and played in all of their games (against Fiji, Italy and PNG). Mark continues to be an advocate for growing the game in the States.

== Coaching career ==
As well as being co-owner, Mark took over head coach/player responsibilities for New York Freedom for their inaugural 2021 season in the new North American Rugby League

== Off the field ==
Offerdahl now lives in Austin, Texas, USA and owns CrossFit Uncommon.

Preceded by Club founded	Coach New York Freedom; 2021-present	Succeeded by Incumbent
