= Stephen Howard (rugby league) =

American international rugby league player

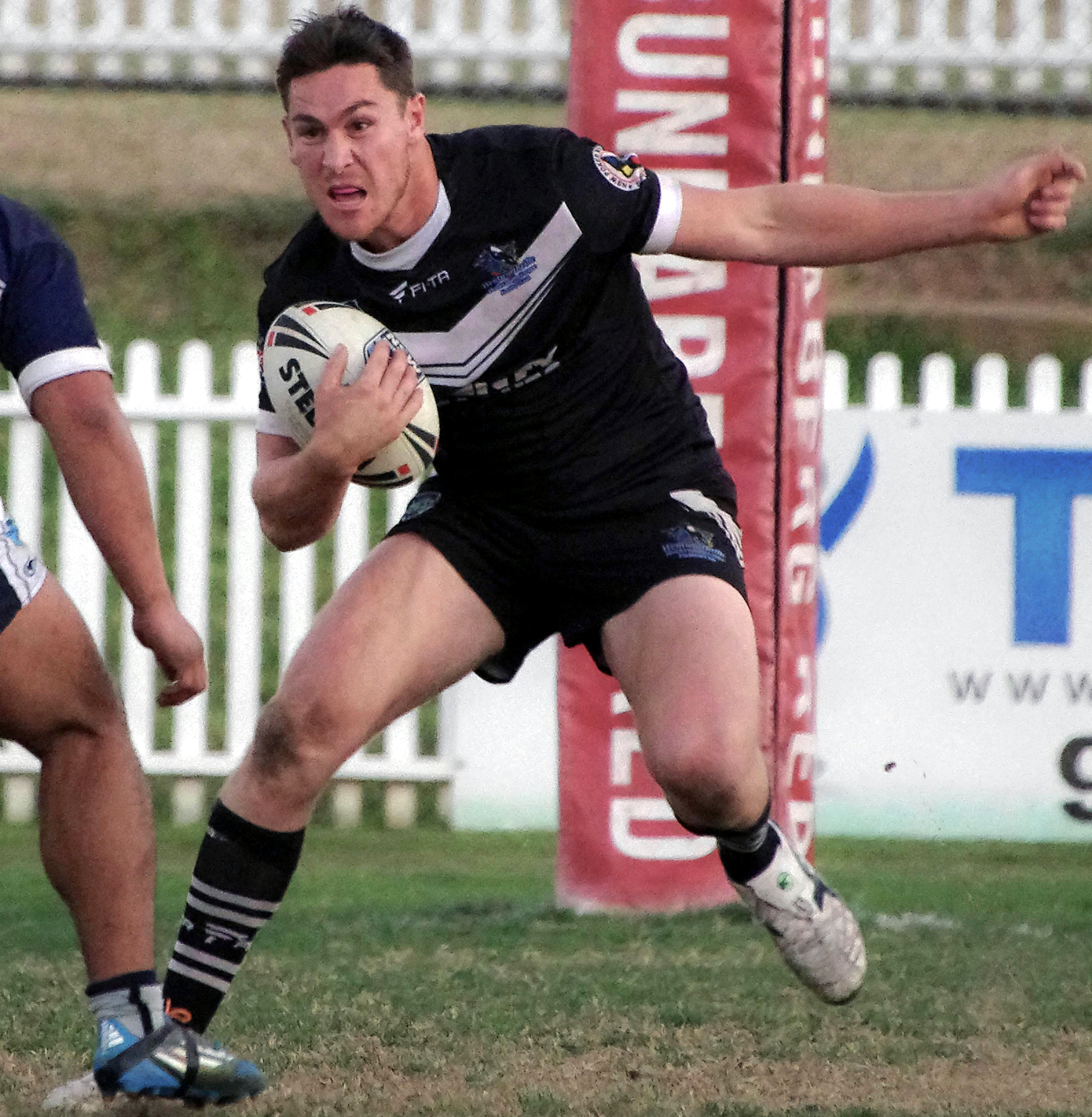

Personal information
- Born: January 13, 1987 (age 39) Los Angeles, California, United States
- Height: 6 ft 4 in (193 cm)
- Weight: 216 lb (98 kg)

Playing information
- Position: Second-row
Representative
Years	Team	Pld	T	G	FG	P
2011–15	United States	5	1	0	0	4
- Relatives: Daniel Howard (brother)

Stephen Howard (born January 13, 1987) is a United States rugby league player who represented United States national rugby league team in the 2013 World Cup.

== Playing career ==
Howard plays for the Tuggeranong Bushrangers in the Canberra Raiders Cup. In 2013 he won the club's best and fairest award.

In 2013, Howard was named in the United States squad for the World Cup. He scored his first international try against Jamaica. In 2015, Stephen played for the United States in their 2017 Rugby League World Cup qualifiers.

== Family ==
Howard is the brother of fellow U.S. team member Daniel Howard.
