= Magot =

Magot (pronounced mă-gō) may refer to:

- The Barbary macaque (Macaca sylvanus)
- Magot (figurine), a type of figurine which the Les Deux Magots café in Paris is named after

== People with the name ==
- Ajak Magot (born 1992), South Sudanese basketball player

== See also ==
- Maggot, the wormlike larva of flies.
