= Maui Rugby =

American rugby union

Maui Rugby League
Club information
- Full name: Maui Rugby League Football Club
- Founded: 2010

Current details
- CEO: Jack Breen

The Maui Rugby Club are an American rugby union and rugby league team based in Maui, Hawaii.

== Notable players ==
- Sione Taufa- United States national rugby league team rugby league international player
- Vaka Manupuna- United States national rugby league team rugby league international player
