= Corey Hanson =

Jamaica international rugby league footballer

Personal information
- Full name: Corey Hanson
- Born: 11 August 1992 (age 33) Sheffield, England

Playing information
- Position: Centre, Second-row, Loose forward
Club
Years	Team	Pld	T	G	FG	P
2010–14	Sheffield Eagles	24	12	0	0	48
2014(loan)	→ Gloucestershire All Golds	3	0	0	0	0
2015–16	York City Knights
2017	Doncaster
2017(loan)	→ Hemel Stags	14	0	0	0	0
	Total	41	12	0	0	48
Representative
Years	Team	Pld	T	G	FG	P
2011–16	Jamaica	5	3	1	0	14
- Source: As of 4 December 2015

Corey Hanson (born 11 August 1992) is a Jamaica international rugby league footballer who last played for the Hemel Stags in League 1.

== Background ==
Hanson was born in Sheffield, South Yorkshire, England.

== Career ==
He has played at representative level for Jamaica, and at club level for Sheffield Eagles, Gloucestershire All Golds (loan), York City Knights, Doncaster in Kingstone Press League 1, and Hemel Stags (loan), as a centre, second-row, or loose forward.

He started his career at Sheffield Eagles, where he made his début for the club in the 2010 season, having progressed through the club's academy.

== International career ==
In 2011, Corey was called up to the Jamaica squad, for their World Cup Qualifiers against South Africa and USA. Corey was chosen to play in both matches, and scored Jamaica's only try in their defeat by the USA.

Corey received another call up in 2013, and scored his second try for Jamaica in their 38–14 defeat by Canada.

Corey was again called up in 2014, and again scored a try and added a conversion in Jamaica's narrow 24–20 defeat by Canada.

In 2015, Corey played for Jamaica in their 2017 Rugby League World Cup qualifying campaign.
