= Alex Brown (rugby league) =

Jamaica international rugby league footballer

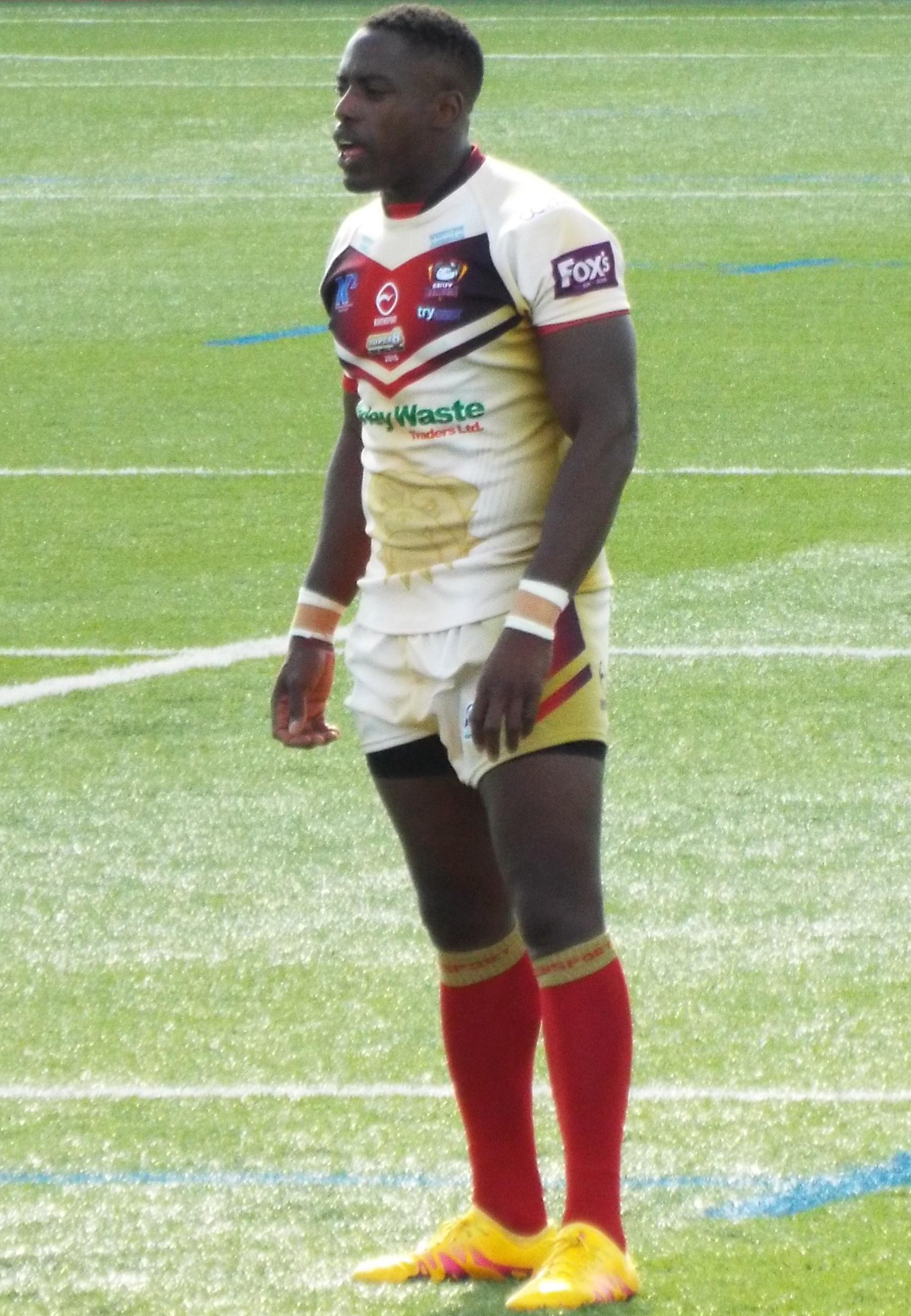

Personal information
- Full name: Alexander Brown
- Born: 28 August 1987 (age 39) England
- Height: 5 ft 11 in (180 cm)
- Weight: 14 st 0 lb (89 kg)

Playing information
- Position: Wing
Club
Years	Team	Pld	T	G	FG	P
2009	Huddersfield Giants	1	0	0	0	0
2010–12	Batley Bulldogs	54	28	0	0	112
2010(loan)	→ Widnes Vikings	1	1	0	0	4
2013	Hull Kingston Rovers	16	9	0	0	36
2013(loan)	→ Gateshead Thunder	1	1	0	0	4
2014	Leigh Centurions	2	0	0	0	0
2014	Batley Bulldogs	20	12	0	0	48
2015	Halifax	9	5	0	0	20
2015(loan)	→ Coventry Bears	5	2	0	0	8
2015(loan)	→ Batley Bulldogs	14	13	0	0	52
2016–17	Batley Bulldogs	18	7	0	0	28
2017(loan)	→ Dewsbury Rams	2	0	0	0	0
2018	Bradford Bulls	0	0	0	0	0
2019–	Dewsbury Rams	0	0	0	0	0
	Total	143	78	0	0	312
Representative
Years	Team	Pld	T	G	FG	P
2010–	Jamaica	9	6	0	0	24
- Source: As of 10 April 2018

Alexander Brown (born 28 August 1987) is a Jamaica international rugby league footballer who plays on the wing for the Underbank Rangers

He has played at representative level for Jamaica, and at club level for Keighley, Rochdale Hornets, Huddersfield, Batley and Hull Kingston Rovers, as a wing. He made his first-grade début, playing Left-Wing in the 10-12 defeat by St. Helens in 2009s Super League XIV at Knowsley Road, St. Helens on Friday 21 August 2009. He was "dual-registered" for 2010s Super League XV, with Co-operative Championship club Batley, which means he played on loan at Batley with the option of an immediate recall to Huddersfield.

== Background ==
Brown was born in England, and is of Jamaican heritage.

== Bradford Bulls ==
At the end of 2017, Brown signed a 1-year deal with League 1 side Bradford Bulls linking up with his former coach John Kear.

== Representative career ==
Brown played, and scored a try in Jamaica's 26-36 defeat by United States in the 2010 Atlantic Cup at Hodges Stadium, Jacksonville, Florida on Tuesday 16 November 2010. In 2015, Brown played for Jamaica in their 2017 Rugby League World Cup qualifiers.
