= Richie Barnett (rugby league, born 1981) =

Jamaica international rugby league footballer

Personal information
- Born: 26 April 1981 (age 45)

Playing information
- Position: Wing
Club
Years	Team	Pld	T	G	FG	P
2004–05	Hull FC	28	21	0	0	84
2005	Widnes Vikings	4	2	0	0	8
2006–07	Warrington Wolves	41	18	0	0	72
2007	Salford City Reds	7	4	0	0	16
2010	Sheffield Eagles	11	5	0	0	20
2011	Hunslet Hawks	20	6	0	0	24
2012–14	Keighley Cougars	67	32	0	0	128
2015–16	Hunslet Hawks	26	7	0	0	28
2017	Doncaster
	Total	204	95	0	0	380
Representative
Years	Team	Pld	T	G	FG	P
2011–15	Jamaica	3	0	0	0	0
- Source: As of 8 December 2015

Richie Barnett (born 26 April 1981) is a Jamaica international rugby league footballer who has played in the 2000s and 2010s. He has played at representative level for Great Britain (Students), and Jamaica, and at club level for Gateshead Thunder (semi-professionally), Hull FC, Widnes Vikings, Warrington Wolves, Salford City Reds, Sheffield Eagles, Hunslet Hawks (two spells), Keighley Cougars and Doncaster in League 1, as a wing.

Barnett had the best average gain per carry in the Warrington Wolves squad in 2006.

His early days were spent playing semi-professionally at Gateshead Thunder, while he was also studying business computing at Leeds Metropolitan University. He was a key player for Leeds Metropolitan University, leading them to numerous cup and league triumphs. He was top scorer for two out of the three years he was at the university. While still at university Barnett represented Great Britain students which paved the way for Gateshead Thunder to take him on.

Barnett was sold to Hull F.C. in 2004 who paid an appearance-linked deal worth £15,000. He proved his worth by scoring 23 tries in just 25 starts, making him one of Super League's top scorers. Along the way he also picked up a Challenge Cup winners medal with Hull. He joined Warrington Wolves in 2005 and became one of the most consistent try scorers for the club.

Barnett joined Salford City Reds in July 2007.

In March 2008, Barnett received a two-year ban from rugby league after testing positive for epitestosterone in a drugs test the previous year. He signed for Sheffield Eagles when returning to the game in 2010.

In 2011, Barnett represented Jamaica in the 2013 Rugby League World Cup Qualifiers, where the Jamaicans took on the USA and South Africa. In 2015, Barnett played for Jamaica in their 2017 Rugby League World Cup qualifiers.

He is occasionally known as Richie Barnett Jr because he used to play with an older un-related rugby league footballer, also named Richie Barnett.
