= Lamont Bryan =

Jamaica international rugby league player

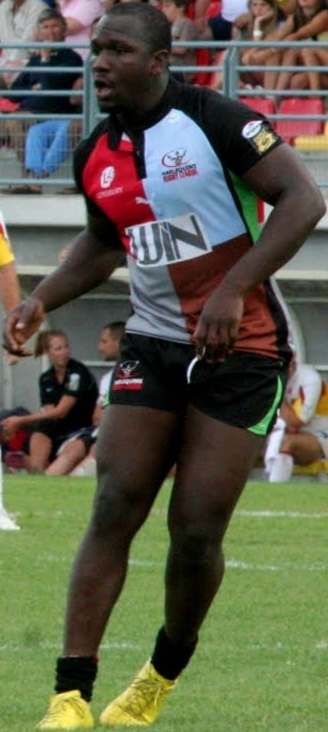

Personal information
- Full name: Lamont Bryan
- Born: 12 April 1988 (age 38) München, Germany
- Height: 6 ft 1 in (1.85 m)
- Weight: 16 st 12 lb (107 kg)

Playing information
- Position: Second-row, Loose forward, Wing
Club
Years	Team	Pld	T	G	FG	P
2008–12	London Broncos	33	2	0	0	8
2010–12	→ London Skolars	30	12	0	0	48
2013	Featherstone Rovers	24	6	0	0	24
2014–15	London Skolars	24	4	0	0	16
2016	Gloucestershire All Golds	22	7	0	0	28
2017–	London Skolars	33	13	0	0	52
	Total	166	44	0	0	176
Representative
Years	Team	Pld	T	G	FG	P
2009–18	Jamaica	10	2	0	0	8
- Source: As of 11 February 2018

Lamont Bryan (born 12 April 1988) is a Jamaica international rugby league footballer who plays for the London Skolars in League 1. Lamont Bryan's usual position is Centre. He can also operate at fullback, Wing, or second-row.

== Background ==
Bryan was born in Germany to an African-American father, and a Jamaican mother. He was brought up in Croydon, and played his junior rugby league with the South London Storm. Bryan also plays rugby union for Streatham-Croydon RFC.

== Featherstone Rovers ==
In January 2013 Lamont was signed by Featherstone Rovers. Where he made a total of 24 appearances, scoring 6 tries in just one season for the club.

== London Skolars ==
Lamont signed a deal to play for the London Skolars in 2014.

In 2015, Bryan played for Jamaica in their 2017 Rugby League World Cup qualifiers. Just missing out on a finals place.

He began his second spell at Skolars in 2017.
