= Joel Farrell =

Jamaica international rugby league footballer

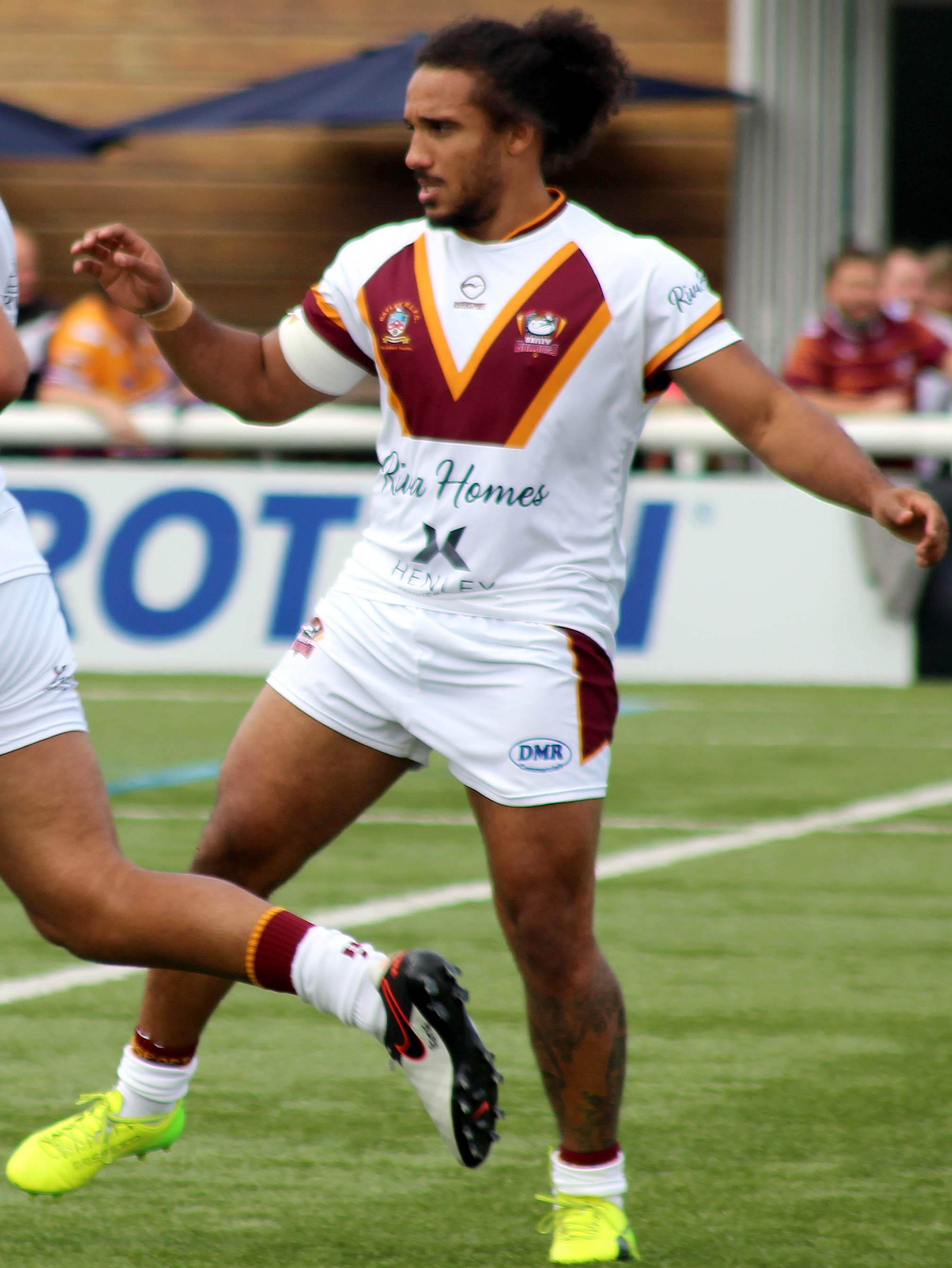

Personal information
- Full name: Joel Cameron Farrell
- Born: 15 March 1994 (age 32) Huddersfield, West Yorkshire, England
- Height: 5 ft 10 in (1.77 m)
- Weight: 15 st 4 lb (97 kg)

Playing information
- Position: Second-row
Club
Years	Team	Pld	T	G	FG	P
2014–16	Dewsbury Rams	54	17	0	0	68
2014(loan)	→Gateshead Thunder	5	1	0	0	4
2017–18	Batley Bulldogs	52	10	0	0	36
2019–	Sheffield Eagles	139	43	8	0	188
	Total	250	71	8	0	296
Representative
Years	Team	Pld	T	G	FG	P
2015–	Jamaica	9	3	4	0	20
- Source: As of 6 November 2026
- Father: Anthony Farrell
- Relatives: Izaac Farrell (brother)

Joel Farrell (born 15 March 1994) is a Jamaican professional rugby league footballer who plays as a second-row forward for the Sheffield Eagles in the Championship and Jamaica at international level.

Farrell is a Jamaican international. He has previously spent time on loan at the Gateshead Thunder in the Kingstone Press League 1 competition. In 2019 he helped the Eagles to win the inaugural 1895 Cup as they defeated Widnes Vikings 36–18 in the final; Farrell scored a try to level the game at 18–18.

He has also previously played for the Dewsbury Rams and the Batley Bulldogs.

== Personal life ==
Born in England, Farrell is of Jamaican, Trinidadian, English and Scottish descent.
