= Missoula Maggots =

Rugby team in Montana, U.S.

Missoula All-Maggots RFC
- Full name: Missoula All-Maggots Rugby Football Club
- Union: Montana Rugby Union
- Founded: 1976
- Ground: Fort Missoula Regional Park

Official website
- maggots.org

The Missoula All Maggots RFC or the Missoula Maggots are an amateur rugby union football club based out of Missoula, Montana. The club was established in 1976 by former rugby club players recently graduated from the University of Montana in Missoula. The Maggots play competitive rugby union and rugby sevens versions of rugby within the Montana Rugby Union which is affiliated with USA Rugby.

The Maggots are traditionally a rugby union style team when they are in competition as the popularity of rugby sevens is much newer to rugby overall. The Maggots also play against other Division I, Division II, and Division III men's and collegiate rugby clubs throughout the Pacific Northwest, United States, and Canada when not committed to Montana Rugby Union play. The Maggots are known to tour much more than other rugby clubs in the United States, frequently taking road tours using their infamous club Maggotbus to domestic and Canadian locations. As of 2025 the Maggots are on their fifth Maggotbus since their founding. The Maggots typically tour several times each year across Western US states and Western Canada. The team has taken international tours to the Cayman Islands, New Zealand (3 occasions), Japan, England (2 occasions), France, Australia, and Ireland. Team colors are black and white. As of 2025, The Maggots have 28 Montana Rugby Union titles since the Union was founded in 1977.

== Maggotfest ==
The Maggots have hosted the Annual Maggotfest social rugby festival in Missoula annually since 1977. Maggotfest attracts teams from throughout the United States, Canada, and the world to partake in its unique social rugby festival offering. Teams from England, Wales, France, New Zealand, and Australia have come to participate in Maggotfest. The non-elimination rugby match style festival focuses on the fun, social, and bonding aspects of the game as well as emphasizing competitive rugby gameplay and sportsmanship as well. The Maggotfest festival hosts up to 48 rugby teams and over 2,000 individuals come annually to play or simply join the festivities every year. Maggotfest has strong rugby union participant loyalty as a majority attending come year after year. There are men's, old boys, and women's divisions, with teams of several varying rugby skill levels.
