= Campbell's Field =

Baseball park in Camden, New Jersey, US

- Location within New Jersey Location within the United States
- Interactive map of Campbell's Field
- Address: 401 North Delaware Avenue; Camden, New Jersey, U.S.
- Coordinates: 39.950245°N 75.128306°W
- Owner: Camden County Improvement Authority
- Operator: Rutgers University–Camden
- Capacity: 6,700
- Surface: Grass
- Field size: Left field: 325 ft (99 m); Center field: 405 ft (123 m); Right field: 325 ft (99 m)

Construction
- Groundbreaking: June 15, 1999
- Opened: May 11, 2001
- Demolished: December 2018
- Years active: 2001–2018
- Cost: $25 million
- Architect: Clarke Caton Hintz

Tenants
- Camden Riversharks (ALPB) 2001–2015; Rutgers–Camden Scarlet Raptors (NCAA) 2001–2018; Saint Joseph's Hawks (NCAA) 2009–2011; Temple Owls (NCAA) 2014

Campbell's Field was a 6,425-seat baseball park in Camden, New Jersey, United States that hosted its first regular season baseball game on May 11, 2001. The ballpark was home to the Rutgers–Camden college baseball team, and until 2015 was home to the Camden Riversharks of the independent Atlantic League of Professional Baseball. The naming rights were owned by the Camden-based Campbell's, which paid $3 million over ten years. Stadium demolition started in mid-December 2018.

The park, located at Delaware and Penn Avenues on the Camden Waterfront, featured a commanding view of the Benjamin Franklin Bridge connecting Camden with Philadelphia, Pennsylvania across the Delaware River. Views of the Philadelphia skyline could be seen from the right-field grandstand and via "Campbell's Field Cam", a stationary weather camera broadcast on KYW-TV.

== History ==
Ground was broken for the ballpark on June 15, 1999, with former New Jersey governor Christine Todd Whitman in attendance. Campbell's Field was funded by the New Jersey Economic Development Authority, a loan from the Delaware River Port Authority, a grant from Rutgers University, and private financing obtained by the builder, Quaker Construction. During construction, the stadium was owned by the Cooper's Ferry Development Association. Upon completion, it became the property of Rutgers, which signed a lease with Camden Baseball, LLC to operate the stadium in conjunction with the Atlantic League.

The new ballpark involved a $24 million construction project that included $7 million for environmental remediation costs. Prior to construction, Campbell's Field was a vacant, undeveloped parcel of land that historically housed businesses that included the Campbell Soup Company Plant No. 2, Pennsylvania & Reading Rail Road's Linden Street Freight Station, David Baird & Company's lumber mill and Eavenson & Sons’ soap manufacturing company.

Campbell's Field opened in May 2001, and was one of the projects designed to spark urban renewal in Camden. The ballpark was honored in 2003 by DigitalBallparks.com and in 2004 by Baseball America as the "Ballpark of the Year." Campbell's Field was honored with several local awards, including the Camden County Improvement Authority Entertainment Award in 2000, the International Masonry Institute Golden Trowel Award in 2001, the Urban Land Institute's Award for Excellence in 2002, the Downtown New Jersey Excellence Award, the New Jersey Business and Industry Association Good Neighbor Award, and the Distinguished Award for Engineering Excellence given by the Consulting Engineers Council of New Jersey in 2003.

In April 2009, Campbell Soup announced that it would continue to have its name on the ballpark at least through 2020.

In 2011 Campbell's Field is where the United States national rugby league team achieved victory in the Atlantic pool of 2013 Rugby League World Cup qualifying, booking the nation's first ever Rugby League World Cup appearance.

The stadium's financing totaled $35 million in loans and bonds from banks and various state and county public agencies, including the New Jersey Economic Development Authority (which issued a $7 million bond), the Delaware River Port Authority (a $6.5 million loan) and Rutgers University ($2 million). Threatened with foreclosure in 2015 amid millions of dollars in outstanding rental fees, the Camden County Improvement Authority (CCIA) acquired the property for $3.5 million and came to agreement on a 15-year deal with the team to repay the money through ticket surcharges, though the demise of the Riversharks later that year meant that only one payment was made towards that surcharge. While the stadium incurred annual debt service payments of $300,000, the facility brought in $100,000 in annual revenue, mostly from Rutgers University for rental fees for the Rutgers University–Camden Scarlet Raptors baseball team to use the stadium as its home field.

In October 2015, after failing to reach an agreement with CCIA on the revised terms of a lease agreement, the stadium's primary professional tenant, the Camden Riversharks, ceased operations.

In September 2018, a contractor was awarded the $1.1 million task of demolishing the stadium. Stadium demolition started in mid-December 2018. The site was to be redeveloped by spring 2020 as a new athletic complex to include a home for Rutgers–Camden baseball. Demolition and surface preparation for the new complex was funded by the city of Camden and Rutgers University. The $16 million athletic complex, called Camden Athletic Fields, officially opened on May 2, 2022.

== College and Atlantic League baseball ==
From its opening in 2001 through 2018, Campbell's Field hosted home games for the Rutgers–Camden Scarlet Raptors baseball team.

On July 14, 2004, Campbell's Field hosted the Atlantic League All-Star Game. In that 2004 All-Star Game, the North Division beat the South Division, 10–8. Kevin Baez of the Long Island Ducks won the All-Star Game MVP. Attendance was 6,234. Campbell's Field once again played host to the Atlantic League All-Star Game in 2012, when the Freedom Division beat the Liberty Division, 9–5. Fehlandt Lentini of the Lancaster Barnstormers won the All-Star Game MVP. Attendance was 7,619.

The ballpark also hosted the 2008 Atlantic 10 Conference baseball tournament, in which the University of North Carolina-Charlotte defeated Xavier University in the championship game to win the tournament. The field also hosted the tournament in 2010 and 2011, with Saint Louis winning in 2010 and Charlotte in 2011. The St. Joseph's University baseball team played six games at Campbell's Field in 2009 and its entire home schedule in 2010. The Saint Joseph's baseball program made the park its full-time home until the completion of its on-campus facility in 2012.

Temple University played all but one of their conference games at Campbell's Field for the 2014 season, which would be their last season.

== Ballpark attractions ==
As part of its naming rights contract, the concessions at Campbell's Field featured several Campbell's Soup Company products such as V8 beverages, Pace salsa, and Pepperidge Farm rolls and snacks. A traditional ballpark menu was also available, with hot dogs produced by the Philadelphia-based Dietz & Watson Inc. Additional options were available at the Picnic Pavilion, that included items from a local barbecue restaurant called Fat Jack's BBQ. The Flying Fish Brewing Company, based in nearby Cherry Hill, sold beer in the pub area.

The Fun Zone was a children's playground. It was hosted by the Riversharks mascot, Finley, and included a carousel and inflatables.

Campbell's Field offered multiple seating options for its patrons. The Diamond Café included a gourmet buffet, with a waiting service, and views of the Philadelphia skyline and the Benjamin Franklin Bridge. The Skyline & Bridge Suites, private rooms available for conferences or meetings, also offered skyline views and catering.

== Rugby league ==
In 2011, Campbell's Field hosted the Atlantic Qualifiers tournament for the 2013 Rugby League World Cup. The competition ran from October 15 to 23 and was contested by the United States, South Africa, and Jamaica. The United States won the tournament to gain a spot in the World Cup for the first time in its history.

== Concerts ==
On June 16, 2005, Bob Dylan performed at the stadium during his 2005 North American Tour.

On June 5, 2009, Campbell's Field hosted the popular hip-hop artists T-Pain & Flo Rida.

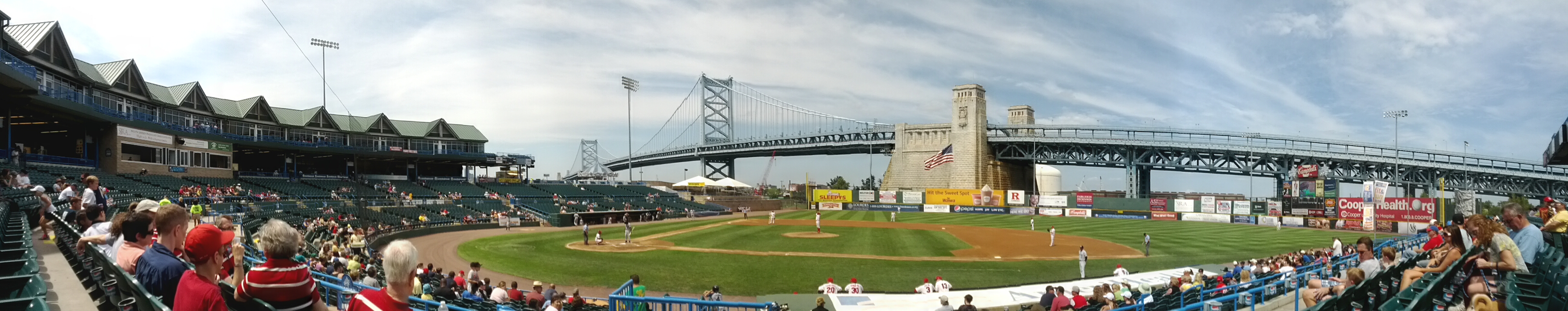
Panoramic view of the Campbell's Field taken in 2012
