= Wayne Reittie =

Jamaica international rugby league footballer

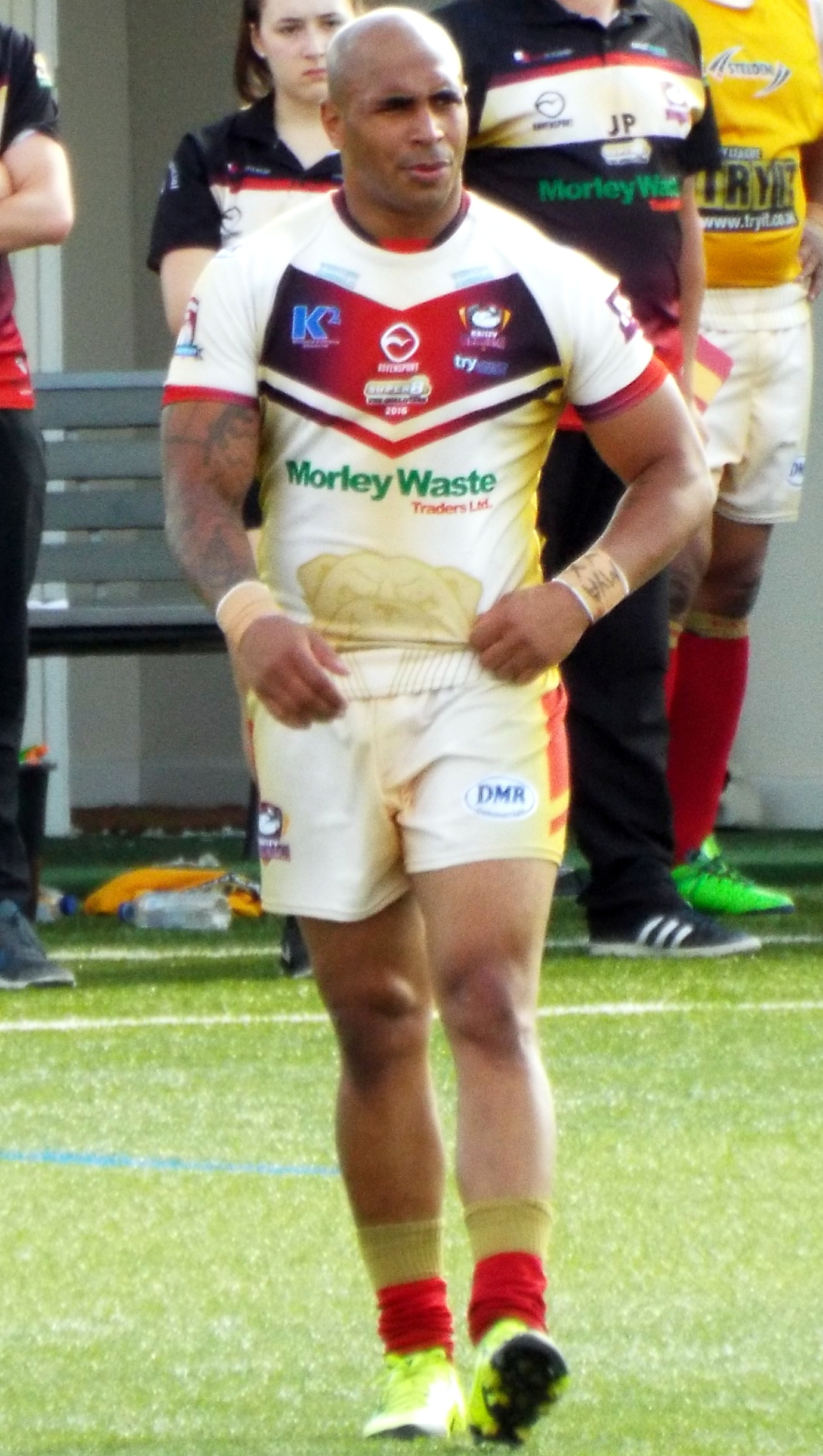

Personal information
- Full name: Wayne Allen Reittie
- Born: 21 January 1988 (age 37); London, England
- Height: 6 ft 0 in (1.82 m)
- Weight: 13 st 8 lb (86 kg)

Playing information
- Position: Wing
Club
Years	Team	Pld	T	G	FG	P
2008–09	Doncaster	42	19	0	0	76
2009	Hunslet Hawks	10	3	0	0	12
2010	York City Knights	16	5	0	0	20
2011	Batley Bulldogs	26	7	0	0	28
2012–14	Halifax	44	24	0	0	96
2014–20	Batley Bulldogs	134	82	0	0	348
2021–22	Hunslet	30	12	0	0	48
	Total	302	152	0	0	628
Representative
Years	Team	Pld	T	G	FG	P
2009–16	Jamaica	9	6	0	0	24
- Source: As of 15 May 2024

Wayne Allen Reittie (born 21 January 1988) is a Jamaica international rugby league footballer who last played as a winger for Hunslet in the RFL League 1.

He has previously played for Doncaster in 2008 National League Two and the 2009 RFL Championship, and the Hunslet Hawks and the York City Knights in Championship 1. Reittie has also played for the Batley Bulldogs and Halifax in the Championship.

== Background ==
Reittie was born in London, England. He grew up in Belle Isle, Leeds, and played junior rugby with Hunslet Parkside.

== Playing career ==
Reittie played for York City Knights in Championship 1 having started out as a professional with Doncaster.

He played for Hunslet in the latter half of 2009 following financial difficulties at Co-operative Championship club Doncaster. York City Knights had expressed an interest in the Leeds brought up winger, but he opted for their Championship One rivals Hunslet.

Wayne Reittie's usual position is as a wing.

He is a Jamaican international.

He was born in London and brought up in Leeds. He played for Hunslet Parkside as a junior, the same club as dual-code international Jason Robinson.

Reittie is a product of the Leeds Academy.

In December 2015, Rettie represented Jamaica in the 2017 Rugby League World Cup qualifiers.

=== Hunslet ===
On 15 October 2021, it was reported that he had signed for Hunslet in the RFL League 1. In August 2022, Reittie suffered a season-ending injury in a match against Doncaster.
