= Hamish Barnes =

Jamaica international rugby league footballer

Personal information
- Born: 22 May 1992 (age 32); Halifax, West Yorkshire, England

Playing information
- Position: Centre
Club
Years	Team	Pld	T	G	FG	P
2015–16	Keighley Cougars	28	20	0	0	80
2017	Dewsbury Rams	8	1	0	0	4
2017–18	Keighley Cougars	21	7	0	0	28
	Total	57	28	0	0	112
Representative
Years	Team	Pld	T	G	FG	P
2014	Jamaica	2	1	0	0	4
- Source: As of 18 September 2017

Hamish Barnes (born 22 May 1992) is a Jamaica international rugby league footballer who last played for the Keighley Cougars in League 1. He played as a centre.

== Background ==
Barnes was born in Halifax, West Yorkshire, England.

== Playing career ==
Barnes started his career with various amateur teams in Halifax. Barnes toured Jamaica with the BARLA under-23 team in 2014 and while there was approached by the Jamaican rugby league federation about playing for Jamaica. Barnes is half-Jamaican and made his début for the Jamaica against Canada in 2014 while still an amateur player.

Barnes turned professional when he signed with Keighley in 2015. After two seasons at Keighley, Barnes left to join Dewsbury Rams for the 2017 season but after only eight appearances for Dewsbury he was released by the club and re-signed for Keighley for the remainder of the 2017 season.
