= Tyronie Rowe =

Jamaica international rugby league footballer

Personal information
- Full name: Tyronie Rowe

Playing information

Rugby union
Representative
Years	Team	Pld	T	G	FG	P
	Jamaica 7s	0	0	0	0	0

Rugby league
- Position: Loose forward
Representative
Years	Team	Pld	T	G	FG	P
2010–17	Jamaica	10	0	0	0	0
- Source: As of 11 July 2022

Tyronie Rowe is a Jamaican rugby league player for the Washington DC Slayers in the USARL. His position is loose forward. He has previously played for Vauxhall Vultures in Jamaica and also the Hurricanes Rugby League. He is a Jamaican international. and has also played for the Jamaican Rugby 7s team. In 2015 Tyronie played for Jamaica in their 2017 Rugby League World Cup qualifiers.
