= 2013 Rugby League World Cup qualifying =

2013 Rugby League World Cup qualification
Tournament details
- Dates: 15 October 2011 – 29 October 2011
- Teams: 7 (from 2 confederations)

Tournament statistics
- Matches played: 9

Of the fourteen teams that would participate in the 2013 Rugby League World Cup, only two were not automatic inclusions, so must win qualifying matches to enter the tournament, which was held in Wales and England. Originally around twenty teams were to be involved in qualification for the tournament, but this was eventually fixed at nineteen.

== Qualified teams ==
Pacific

Seven teams from the Pacific qualified for the World Cup. All of these teams were granted automatic qualification.

- Australia (automatic qualifier)
- New Zealand (automatic qualifier)
- Papua New Guinea (automatic qualifier)
- Tonga (automatic qualifier)
- Fiji (automatic qualifier)
- Samoa (automatic qualifier)
- Cook Islands (automatic qualifier)

Europe

Six teams from Europe qualified; five teams automatically, with the sixth going to Italy, the winner of the European qualifying group.

- England (automatic qualifier and co-host)
- Wales (automatic qualifier and co-host)
- France (automatic qualifier)
- Ireland (automatic qualifier)
- Scotland (automatic qualifier)
- Italy (Winner of the European qualifying group)

Atlantic

One team from the Atlantic region qualified for the World Cup.

- United States (Winner of the Atlantic qualifying group)

== Atlantic qualifying ==
The Atlantic qualifying group involved the USA, Jamaica and South Africa. The Atlantic qualifiers were held at Campbell's Field, New Jersey. USA won the group and qualified for the World Cup.

Team	Pld	W	D	L	TF	PF	PA	+/−	BP	Pts
United States	2	2	0	0	0	80	8	+72	0	4
Jamaica	2	1	0	1	0	24	46	−22	0	2
South Africa	2	0	0	2	0	10	60	−50	0	0

15 October 2011	United States	40–4	South Africa	Campbell's Field, New Jersey
19 October 2011	South Africa	6–20	Jamaica	Campbell's Field, New Jersey
23 October 2011	Jamaica	4–40	United States	Campbell's Field, New Jersey

== European qualifying ==
The European qualifying group involved Russia, Italy, Serbia and Lebanon. Both Italy and Lebanon remained unbeaten, recording two wins and a draw each. However, Italy topped the group as a result of points difference and therefore qualified for the World Cup.

Team	Pld	W	D	L	PF	PA	+/−	Pts
Italy	3	2	1	0	163	31	+132	5
Lebanon	3	2	1	0	147	23	+124	5
Russia	3	1	0	2	42	152	−110	2
Serbia	3	0	0	3	38	184	−146	0

15 October 2011	Italy	92–6	Russia	Stadio Plebiscito, Padova
16 October 2011	Lebanon	96–4	Serbia	International Olympic Stadium, Tripoli
22 October 2011	Russia	0–32	Lebanon	Vereya Stadium, Vereya
23 October 2011	Serbia	6–52	Italy	Makiš Stadium, Belgrade
29 October 2011	Serbia	28–36	Russia	Makiš Stadium, Belgrade
29 October 2011	Italy	19–19	Lebanon	Makiš Stadium, Belgrade

== See also ==
- Rugby League World Cup
- 2013 Rugby League World Cup
