= List of Bradford Bulls records and statistics =

This is a list of all the records and statistics of rugby league side Bradford Bulls. It concentrates on the records of the team and the performances of the players who have played for this team. Since the re-brand in 1996 the Bulls have gone on to win many honours and awards. Under the re-brand the Bulls played their first game against Batley Bulldogs in the 1996 Challenge Cup on 4 February 1996, Bradford won the match 60–18. As of 7 October 2021 the Bulls have played 788 games.

== Team records ==
=== Team wins, losses, ties and draws ===
==== Matches played ====
Team	1st Game	Matches	Won	Lost	Drawn	Points For	Points Against	% Won
Bradford Bulls	4 February 1996	879	529	326	24	25692	18778	60.19
Source:. Last updated: 8 September 2024.

==== Results summary ====
Opposition	Span	Matches	Won	Lost	Drawn	Points For	Points Against	% Won
Barrow Raiders	2019–2024	9	3	5	1	186	247	00.00
Batley Bulldogs	1996–2024	17	10	6	1	422	335	00.00
Castleford Tigers	1996–2014	42	28	12	2	1346	861	00.00
Catalans Dragons	2006–2014	23	11	11	1	647	522	00.00
Coventry Bears	2018	2	2	0	0	114	18	100.00
Cronulla Sharks	1997	2	0	2	0	22	70	00.00
Crusaders RL	2009–2011	7	4	3	0	176	171	00.00
Dewsbury Rams	2010–2024	19	16	3	0	669	289	00.00
Doncaster R.L.F.C.	2012–2024	7	7	0	0	344	78	100.00
Featherstone Rovers	2005–2024	21	6	15	0	414	591	00.00
Gateshead Thunder	1999	2	2	0	0	52	26	100.00
Halifax Panthers	1996–2024	42	24	16	2	1191	885	00.00
Hemel Stags	2018	2	2	0	0	120	7	100.00
Huddersfield Giants	1998–2014	40	28	12	0	1327	845	00.00
Hull F.C.	1998–2014	47	28	17	2	1248	956	00.00
Hull Kingston Rovers	2007–2017	22	8	13	1	520	632	00.00
Hunslet R.L.F.C.	1997–2018	7	7	0	0	370	60	100.00
Keighley Cougars	2018–2024	7	6	1	0	270	104	75.00
Leeds Rhinos	1996–2019	65	34	28	3	1526	1416	00.00
Leigh Centurions	1996–2022	15	6	7	2	442	390	00.00
London Broncos	1996–2023	59	42	16	1	1725	1121	00.00
London Skolars	2018	2	2	0	0	112	28	100.00
Midlands Hurricanes	2023	1	1	0	0	66	18	100.00
Newcastle Knights	2002	1	1	0	0	41	22	100.00
Newcastle Thunder	2018–2023	8	7	1	0	227	137	00.00
New Zealand Warriors	1997	3	0	3	0	44	146	00.00
North Wales Crusaders	2018–2024	3	3	0	0	146	14	100.00
Oldham R.L.F.C.	1996–2021	17	16	1	0	700	206	00.00
Paris Saint-Germain	1996–1997	4	4	0	0	185	64	100.00
Penrith Panthers	1997–2004	3	1	2	0	52	78	00.00
Rochdale Hornets	1998–2019	7	5	2	0	352	102	00.00
Salford Red Devils	1997–2015	35	25	9	1	1234	608	00.00
Sheffield Eagles	1996–2024	29	21	8	0	930	532	00.00
St Helens R.F.C.	1996–2014	57	21	35	1	1273	1661	00.00
Swinton Lions	2016–2024	14	12	1	1	482	294	00.00
Toronto Wolfpack	2019	2	0	2	0	36	61	00.00
Toulouse Olympique	2008–2024	12	5	6	1	266	346	00.00
Underbank Rangers	2020	1	1	0	0	22	0	100.00
Wakefield Trinity	1996–2024	45	32	13	0	1284	841	00.00
Warrington Wolves	1996–2018	50	27	22	1	1473	1307	00.00
West Wales Raiders	2018	3	3	0	0	310	6	100.00
Wests Tigers	2006	1	1	0	0	30	10	100.00
Whitehaven R.L.F.C.	2015–2024	15	13	2	0	547	222	00.00
Widnes Vikings	2001–2024	29	14	13	2	784	607	00.00
Wigan Warriors	1996–2014	52	22	29	1	1057	1333	00.00
Workington Town	1996–2022	14	11	3	0	562	193	00.00
York Acorn A.R.L.F.C.	2023	1	1	0	0	62	6	100.00
York Knights	2018–2024	13	6	7	0	285	284	0.00
Source:. Last updated: 8 September 2024.

==== Highest scores ====
Rank	Score	Opposition	Competition	Venue	Date
1	124-0	vs. West Wales Raiders	2018 League 1	(England) Odsal Stadium, Bradford, West Yorkshire	6 May 2018
2	104-0	vs. West Wales Raiders	2018 League 1	Stebonheath Park, Llanelli, West Wales	9 September 2018
3	98-6	vs. Toulouse Olympique	2008 Challenge Cup	(England) Odsal Stadium, Bradford, West Yorkshire	19 April 2008
4	96-16	vs. Salford City Reds	Super League V	(England) Odsal Stadium, Bradford, West Yorkshire	25 June 2000
5	92-0	vs. Workington Town	1999 Challenge Cup	(England) Odsal Stadium, Bradford, West Yorkshire	14 February 1999
6	84-12	vs. Warrington Wolves	Super League VI	(England) Wilderspool Stadium, Warrington, Cheshire	9 September 2001
7	82-0	vs. Hunslet Hawks	2003 Challenge Cup	(England) South Leeds Stadium, Leeds, West Yorkshire	2 March 2003
8	82-0	vs. Oldham R.L.F.C.	2016 Championship	(England) Odsal Stadium, Bradford, West Yorkshire	21 August 2016
9	82-0	vs. Rochdale Hornets	2019 Championship	(England) Spotland Stadium, Rochdale, Greater Manchester	8 September 2019
10	82-6	vs. West Wales Raiders	2018 Challenge Cup	(England) Odsal Stadium, Bradford, West Yorkshire	25 February 2018
Source:. Last updated: 11 September 2022.

==== Lowest scores ====
Rank	Score	Opposition	Competition	Venue	Date
1	0-54	vs. St Helens R.F.C.	Super League XVII	(England) Langtree Park, St Helens, Merseyside	8 June 2012
2	0-50	vs. St Helens R.F.C.	Super League XIX	(England) Odsal Stadium, Bradford, West Yorkshire	11 May 2014
3	0-44	vs. Featherstone Rovers	2021 Championship	(England) Post Office Road, Featherstone, West Yorkshire	13 June 2021
4	0-35	vs. St Helens R.F.C.	Super League VIII	(England) Odsal Stadium, Bradford, West Yorkshire	27 June 2003
5	0-30	vs. Leeds Rhinos	Super League XI	(England) Odsal Stadium, Bradford, West Yorkshire	26 May 2006
6	0-26	vs. Halifax R.L.F.C.	2023 Challenge Cup	(England) Shay Stadium, Halifax, West Yorkshire	22 April 2023
7	0-20	vs. Featherstone Rovers	2016 Championship	(England) Post Office Road, Featherstone, West Yorkshire	24 July 2016
8	0-19	vs. Crusaders RL	Super League XV	Murrayfield Stadium, Edinburgh, Scotland	1 May 2010
9	0-16	vs. Hull Kingston Rovers	Super League XIX	(England) Craven Park, Kingston upon Hull, East Riding of Yorkshire	23 March 2014
10	0-14	vs. Wigan Warriors	Super League IV	(England) JJB Stadium, Wigan, Greater Manchester	13 August 1999
11	0-14	vs. Toulouse Olympique	2019 Championship	(England) Odsal Stadium, Bradford, West Yorkshire	3 March 2019
Source:. Last updated: 22 April 2023.

==== Biggest wins ====
Rank	Margin	Opposition	Competition	Venue	Date
1	124 points	vs. West Wales Raiders	2018 League 1	(England) Odsal Stadium, Bradford, West Yorkshire	6 May 2018
2	104 points	vs. West Wales Raiders	2018 League 1	Stebonheath Park, Llanelli, West Wales	9 September 2018
3	92 points	vs. Toulouse Olympique	2008 Challenge Cup	(England) Odsal Stadium, Bradford, West Yorkshire	19 April 2008
4	92 points	vs. Workington Town	1999 Challenge Cup	(England) Odsal Stadium, Bradford, West Yorkshire	14 February 1999
5	82 points	vs. Hunslet Hawks	2003 Challenge Cup	(England) South Leeds Stadium, Leeds, West Yorkshire	2 March 2003
6	82 points	vs. Oldham R.L.F.C.	2016 Championship	(England) Odsal Stadium, Bradford, West Yorkshire	21 August 2016
7	82 points	vs. Rochdale Hornets	2019 Championship	(England) Spotland Stadium, Rochdale, Greater Manchester	8 September 2019
8	80 points	vs. Salford City Reds	Super League V	(England) Odsal Stadium, Bradford, West Yorkshire	25 June 2000
9	80 points	vs. Sheffield Eagles	2016 Championship	(England) Odsal Stadium, Bradford, West Yorkshire	18 September 2016
10	76 points	vs. West Wales Raiders	2018 Challenge Cup	(England) Odsal Stadium, Bradford, West Yorkshire	25 February 2018
Source:. Last updated: 11 September 2022.

==== Biggest losses ====
Rank	Margin	Opposition	Competition	Venue	Date
1	78 points	vs. Wigan Warriors	Super League XIX	(England) DW Stadium, Wigan, Greater Manchester	21 April 2014
2	64 points	vs. Hull F.C.	Super League XVII	(England) Odsal Stadium, Bradford, West Yorkshire	1 September 2012
3	62 points	vs. St Helens R.F.C.	Super League X	(England) Odsal Stadium, Bradford, West Yorkshire	5 June 2005
4	58 points	vs. Warrington Wolves	Super League XVI	(England) Halliwell Jones Stadium, Warrington, Cheshire	21 July 2011
5	56 points	vs. Toulouse Olympique	2017 Championship	Stade Ernest-Argelès, Toulouse, France	29 April 2017
6	54 points	vs. St Helens R.F.C.	Super League XVII	(England) Langtree Park, St Helens, Merseyside	8 June 2012
7	54 points	vs. Toulouse Olympique	2021 Championship	(England) Crown Flatt, Dewsbury, West Yorkshire	5 September 2021
8	50 points	vs. New Zealand Warriors	1997 World Club Challenge	Mount Smart Stadium, Auckland, New Zealand	20 July 1997
9	50 points	vs. St Helens R.F.C.	Super League XIX	(England) Odsal Stadium, Bradford, West Yorkshire	11 May 2014
10	50 points	vs. Leigh Centurions	2022 Championship	(England) Odsal Stadium, Bradford, West Yorkshire	3 July 2022
Source:. Last updated: 11 September 2022.

== Individual records ==
=== Most matches as captain ===
Name	Years As Captain	Total	Won	Lost	Drawn
(New Zealand) Robbie Paul	1996–2004	294	216	72	6
(England) Jamie Peacock	2005	34	23	10	1
(Wales) Iestyn Harris	2006, 2008	35	20	13	2
(England) Paul Deacon	2006–2009	70	41	27	2
(Australia) Glenn Morrison	2007–2008	8	3	5	0
(England) Jamie Langley	2008, 2010	9	3	6	0
(England) Andy Lynch	2009–2011	60	22	35	3
(Australia) Heath L'Estrange	2010, 2012–2013	15	9	6	0
(England) Matt Diskin & (Australia) Heath L'Estrange	2012–2013	40	15	22	3
(England) Matt Diskin	2012–2014	22	7	15	0
(England) Luke Gale	2014	13	5	8	0
(England) Chev Walker	2015	11	5	5	1
(Australia) Adrian Purtell	2015–2016	29	23	5	1
(England) Lee Gaskell	2015–2016	8	4	3	1
(England) Adam Sidlow	2016	18	11	7	0
(England) Leon Pryce	2017	11	4	7	0
(England) Scott Moore	2017	17	6	11	0
(England) Sam Hallas	2017–2021	5	3	2	0
(England) Lee Smith	2018	12	12	0	0
(England) Elliot Minchella	2018–2019	6	5	0	1
(England) Steve Crossley	2018–2022	96	52	44	0
(England) Brandon Pickersgill	2019–2021	1	0	1	0
(England) Jordan Lilley	2022–present	25	15	8	2
(England) Michael Lawrence	2023–present	30	17	12	1
(New Zealand) Bodene Thompson	2023	6	4	2	0
(England) Dec Patton	2023	1	1	0	0
(England) Jordan Baldwinson	2023–present	1	1	0	0
Source: Last updated: 8 September 2024.

=== Most career appearances ===
Rank	Apps	Player	Span
1	326	(England) Paul Deacon	1998–2009
2	258	(England) Jamie Langley	2002–2013
3	247	(England) Stuart Fielden	1998–2006
4	242	(New Zealand) Joe Vagana	2001–2008
5	222	(New Zealand) Robbie Paul	1996–2005
6	217	(England) Leon Pryce	1998–2005; 2017
7	207	(England) Jamie Peacock	1998–2005
8	204	(England) Andy Lynch	2005–2011
9	184	(Australia) Michael Withers	1999–2006
10	183	(England) James Lowes	1996–2003
Source:. Last updated: 11 September 2022.

=== Most career points ===
Rank	Points	Player	Span
1	2,610	(England) Paul Deacon	1998–2009
2	967	(New Zealand) Henry Paul	1999–2001
3	860	(England) Steve McNamara	1996–1999
4	590	(New Zealand) Lesley Vainikolo	2002–2007
5	578	(New Zealand) Robbie Paul	1996–2005
6	508	(Australia) Michael Withers	1999–2006
7	497	(England) Jordan Lilley	2017–present
8	476	(England) Joe Keyes	2016–2019; 2021
9	412	(Tonga) Tevita Vaikona	1998–2004
10	406	(England) James Lowes	1996–2003
Source:. Last updated: 8 September 2024.

=== Most career tries ===
Rank	Tries	Player	Span
1	147	(New Zealand) Lesley Vainikolo	2002–2007
2	143	(New Zealand) Robbie Paul	1996–2005
3	117	(Australia) Michael Withers	1999–2006
4	103	(Tonga) Tevita Vaikona	1998–2004
5	98	(England) James Lowes	1996–2003
6	92	(England) Leon Pryce	1998–2005; 2017
7	89	(England) Ethan Ryan	2016–2019
8	86	(New Zealand) Shontayne Hape	2003–2008
9	76	(England) Paul Deacon	1998–2009
10	68	(England) Stuart Spruce	1996–2001
Source:. Last updated: 11 September 2022.

=== Most career goals ===
Rank	Goals	Player	Span
1	1,133	(England) Paul Deacon	1998–2009
2	416	(New Zealand) Henry Paul	1999–2001
3	392	(England) Steve McNamara	1996–1999
4	190	(England) Jordan Lilley	2017–present
5	183	(England) Joe Keyes	2016–2019; 2021
6	164	(England) Dec Patton	2022–2023
7	140	(England) Danny Addy	2010–2016
8	135	(Australia) Dane Chisholm	2016; 2017–2019
9	119	(England) Luke Gale	2012–2014
10	119	(England) Jamie Foster	2013–2014
Source:. Last updated: 8 September 2024.

=== Most career drop goals ===
Rank	DG's	Player	Span
1	24	(England) Paul Deacon	1998–2009
2	13	(England) Jordan Lilley	2017–present
3	8	(England) Steve McNamara	1996–1999
4	7	(New Zealand) Henry Paul	1999–2001
5	5	(England) Luke Gale	2012–2014
6	5	(Australia) Dane Chisholm	2016; 2017–2019
7	5	(England) Danny Brough	2021
8	4	(Australia) Michael Withers	1999–2006
9	4	(England) Oscar Thomas	2016–2017
Source:. Last updated: 18 August 2024.

=== Most points in a season ===
Rank	Points	Player	Season
1	457 points	(New Zealand) Henry Paul	2001
2	404 points	(New Zealand) Henry Paul	2000
3	391 points	(England) Paul Deacon	2005
4	389 points	(England) Paul Deacon	2003
5	336 points	(England) Paul Deacon	2002
6	312 points	(Australia) Dane Chisholm	2018
7	299 points	(England) Steve McNamara	1997
8	286 points	(England) Ryan Shaw	2015
9	282 points	(England) Paul Deacon	2004
10	277 points	(England) Paul Deacon	2006
Source:. Last updated: 11 September 2022.

=== Most tries in a season ===
Rank	Tries	Player	Season
1	39	(New Zealand) Lesley Vainikolo	2004
2	36	(England) Ethan Ryan	2018
3	34	(New Zealand) Lesley Vainikolo	2005
4	33	(England) Elliot Minchella	2018
5	31	(Australia) Michael Withers	2001
6	29	(England) Kris Welham	2016
7	26	(New Zealand) Lesley Vainikolo	2003
8	25	(Tonga) Tevita Vaikona	2001
9	25	(Malta) Jarrod Sammut	2013
10	25	(England) Danny Williams	2015
Source:. Last updated: 7 October 2022.

=== Most goals in a season ===
Rank	Goals	Player	Season
1	208 goals	(New Zealand) Henry Paul	2001
2	179 goals	(New Zealand) Henry Paul	2000
3	173 goals	(England) Paul Deacon	2003
4	169 goals	(England) Paul Deacon	2005
5	155 goals	(England) Paul Deacon	2002
6	133 goals	(England) Steve McNamara	1997
7	124 goals	(England) Paul Deacon	2004
8	124 goals	(England) Paul Deacon	2006
9	121 goals	(Australia) Dane Chisholm	2018
10	112 goals	(England) Paul Deacon	2007
Source:. Last updated: 7 October 2022.

=== Most drop goals in a season ===
Rank	DG's	Player	Season
1	5	(New Zealand) Henry Paul	2001
2	5	(England) Paul Deacon	2005
3	5	(England) Danny Brough	2021
4	4	(England) Steve McNamara	1998
5	4	(England) Paul Deacon	2001
6	3	(England) Paul Deacon	2000
7	3	(England) Paul Deacon	2003
8	3	(England) Paul Deacon	2009
9	3	(England) Luke Gale	2014
10	3	(England) Oscar Thomas	2017
11	3	(England) Jordan Lilley	2019
Source:. Last updated: 7 October 2022.

=== Most points in a match ===
Rank	Points	Player	Opposition	Competition	Venue	Date
1	48 points	(Australia) Dane Chisholm	vs. West Wales Raiders	2018 League 1	(England) Odsal Stadium, Bradford, West Yorkshire	6 May 2018
2	32 points	(New Zealand) Henry Paul	vs. Salford City Reds	Super League V	(England) Odsal Stadium, Bradford, West Yorkshire	25 June 2000
3	30 points	(Wales) Iestyn Harris	vs. Toulouse Olympique	2008 Challenge Cup	(England) Odsal Stadium, Bradford, West Yorkshire	19 April 2008
4	30 points	(England) Ryan Shaw	vs. Workington Town	2015 Challenge Cup	(England) Odsal Stadium, Bradford, West Yorkshire	22 March 2015
5	30 points	(England) Joe Keyes	vs. Widnes Vikings	2019 Championship	(England) Odsal Stadium, Bradford, West Yorkshire	30 June 2019
6	30 points	(England) Joe Keyes	vs. Oldham R.L.F.C.	2021 Championship	(England) Bower Fold, Oldham, Lancashire	11 July 2021
7	28 points	(England) Paul Deacon	vs. Workington Town	1999 Challenge Cup	(England) Odsal Stadium, Bradford, West Yorkshire	14 February 1999
8	28 points	(England) Luke Gale	vs. Oldham R.L.F.C.	2014 Challenge Cup	(England) Odsal Stadium, Bradford, West Yorkshire	6 April 2014
9	28 points	(England) Ryan Shaw	vs. Hunslet Hawks	2015 Championship	(England) Odsal Stadium, Bradford, West Yorkshire	8 March 2015
10	28 points	(England) Joe Keyes	vs. West Wales Raiders	2018 League 1	Stebonheath Park, Llanelli, West Wales	9 September 2018
11	28 points	(England) Joe Keyes	vs. Rochdale Hornets	2019 Championship	(England) Spotland Stadium, Rochdale, Greater Manchester	8 September 2019
Source:. Last updated: 11 September 2022.

=== Most tries in a match ===
Rank	Tries	Player	Opposition	Competition	Venue	Date
1	6 tries	(New Zealand) Lesley Vainikolo	vs. Hull F.C.	Super League X	(England) Odsal Stadium, Bradford, West Yorkshire	2 September 2005
2	5 tries	(New Zealand) Lesley Vainikolo	vs. Wigan Warriors	Super League IX	(England) Odsal Stadium, Bradford, West Yorkshire	20 February 2004
3	5 tries	(England) Kris Welham	vs. Dewsbury Rams	2016 Championship	(England) Rams Stadium, Dewsbury, West Yorkshire	10 April 2016
4	5 tries	(Jamaica) Omari Caro	vs. Oldham R.L.F.C.	2016 Championship	(England) Odsal Stadium, Bradford, West Yorkshire	17 July 2016
5	5 tries	(England) Kris Welham	vs. Oldham R.L.F.C.	2016 Championship	(England) Odsal Stadium, Bradford, West Yorkshire	21 August 2016
6	5 tries	(England) Elliot Minchella	vs. West Wales Raiders	2018 Challenge Cup	(England) Odsal Stadium, Bradford, West Yorkshire	25 February 2018
Source:. Last updated: 11 September 2022.

=== Most goals in a match ===
Rank	Goals	Player	Opposition	Competition	Venue	Date
1	20 goals	(Australia) Dane Chisholm	vs. West Wales Raiders	2018 League 1	(England) Odsal Stadium, Bradford, West Yorkshire	6 May 2018
2	15 goals	(Wales) Iestyn Harris	vs. Toulouse Olympique	2008 Challenge Cup	(England) Odsal Stadium, Bradford, West Yorkshire	19 April 2008
3	14 goals	(New Zealand) Henry Paul	vs. Salford City Reds	Super League V	(England) Odsal Stadium, Bradford, West Yorkshire	25 June 2000
4	14 goals	(England) Joe Keyes	vs. West Wales Raiders	2018 League 1	Stebonheath Park, Llanelli, West Wales	9 September 2018
5	12 goals	(England) Paul Deacon	vs. Workington Town	1999 Challenge Cup	(England) Odsal Stadium, Bradford, West Yorkshire	14 February 1999
6	11 goals	(New Zealand) Henry Paul	vs. Huddersfield Giants	Super League VI	(England) Valley Parade, Bradford, West Yorkshire	10 June 2001
7	11 goals	(England) Paul Deacon	vs. Hunslet Hawks	2003 Challenge Cup	(England) South Leeds Stadium, Leeds, West Yorkshire	2 March 2003
8	11 goals	(England) Paul Deacon	vs. Featherstone Rovers	2005 Challenge Cup	(England) Odsal Stadium, Bradford, West Yorkshire	3 April 2005
9	11 goals	(England) Paul Deacon	vs. Widnes Vikings	Super League X	(England) Odsal Stadium, Bradford, West Yorkshire	7 August 2005
10	11 goals	(England) Ryan Shaw	vs. Workington Town	2015 Challenge Cup	(England) Odsal Stadium, Bradford, West Yorkshire	22 March 2015
11	11 goals	(England) Joe Keyes	vs. West Wales Raiders	2018 Challenge Cup	(England) Odsal Stadium, Bradford, West Yorkshire	25 February 2018
12	11 goals	(England) Myles Lawford	vs. Midlands Hurricanes	2023 Challenge Cup	(England) Odsal Stadium, Bradford, West Yorkshire	2 April 2023
Source:. Last updated: 2 April 2023.

=== Most drop goals in a match ===
Rank	DG's	Player	Opposition	Competition	Venue	Date
1	3	(England) Paul Deacon	vs. St Helens R.F.C.	Super League VI	(England) Valley Parade, Bradford, West Yorkshire	17 August 2001
2	2	(England) Paul Deacon	vs. Leeds Rhinos	Super League VIII	(England) Odsal Stadium, Bradford, West Yorkshire	7 September 2003
Source:. Last updated: 11 September 2022.

== Attendance records ==
=== Season average attendance ===
Rank	Average	Highest	Opposition	Season
1	15,284	21,784	vs. Leeds Rhinos	2003
2	14,327	18,387	vs. St Helens R.F.C.	1997
3	14,052	21,237	vs. Leeds Rhinos	2000
4	13,523	22,843	vs. Leeds Rhinos	2005
5	13,026	19,188	vs. Leeds Rhinos	1998
6	12,912	24,020	vs. Leeds Rhinos	1999
7	12,814	19,275	vs. Leeds Rhinos	2011
8	12,784	20,821	vs. Leeds Rhinos	2012
9	12,086	16,572	vs. St Helens R.F.C.	2001
10	11,542	14,271	vs. St Helens R.F.C.	2002
Source:. Last updated: 7 October 2022.

=== Highest match attendance ===
Rank	Att	Opposition	Competition	Date
1	24,020	vs. Leeds Rhinos	Super League IV	3 September 1999
2	23,375	vs. Leeds Rhinos	Super League IX	5 June 2004
3	22,843	vs. Leeds Rhinos	Super League X	24 March 2005
4	21,784	vs. Leeds Rhinos	Super League VIII	23 May 2003
5	21,237	vs. Leeds Rhinos	Super League V	30 July 2000
6	21,102	vs. Leeds Rhinos	Super League VIII	7 September 2003
7	20,851	vs. Leeds Rhinos	Super League XVII	6 April 2012
8	20,283	vs. Wakefield Trinity Wildcats	Super League VII	9 March 2003
9	19,786	vs. Leeds Rhinos	Super League VIII	4 October 2003
10	19,623	vs. Leeds Rhinos	Super League V	8 September 2000
Source:. Last updated: 11 September 2022.

== Coaching ==
=== Coaching records ===
Name	Years As Coach	Total	Won	Lost	Drawn
(Australia) Brian Smith	1996	28	21	7	0
(Australia) Matthew Elliott	1997–2000	132	91	37	4
(England) Brian Noble	2001–2006	180	136	40	4
(England) Steve McNamara	2006–2010	137	69	64	4
(England) Lee St Hilaire	2010	6	1	5	0
(Australia) Michael Potter	2011–2012	58	25	30	3
(England) Francis Cummins	2013–2014	48	17	29	2
(England) Matt Diskin	2014, 2016	3	1	2	0
(England) James Lowes	2014–2016	53	31	19	3
(Australia) Rohan Smith	2016	21	15	6	0
(England) Leigh Beattie	2017	18	5	13	0
(Australia) Geoff Toovey	2017	12	5	7	0
(England) John Kear	2018–2022	102	66	35	1
(England) Mark Dunning	2022–2023	31	14	17	0
(England) Lee Greenwood	2023	19	12	6	1
(England) Eamon O'Carroll	2024–present	29	18	9	2
Source: Last updated: 8 September 2024.
