= 2019 Bradford Bulls season =

- Championship Rank: 6th
- Play-off result: Did not qualify
- Challenge Cup: Quarter-final
- 2019 record: Wins: 19; draws: 1; losses: 12
- Points scored: For: 804; against: 652

Team information
- Chairman: Andrew Chalmers
- Head Coach: John Kear
- Captain: Steve Crossley
- Stadium: Odsal Stadium
- High attendance: 10,258 vs. Leeds Rhinos

Top scorers
- Tries: Ethan Ryan (20)
- Goals: Joe Keyes (52)
- Points: Joe Keyes (136)
← 2018	List of seasons	2020 →

This article details the Bradford Bulls rugby league football club's 2019 season. This is the Bulls 1st season back in the Championship after gaining promotion from League 1 by beating Workington Town 27–8 in the play off final.

== Season Review ==
=== August 2018 ===
It was announced that first team prop forward James Davies left the club to sign for rugby union side Huddersfield RUFC. Recruitment for the new season started as on loan prop forward Callum Bustin signed a permanent contract with the Bulls until the end of 2019. Bradford brought some experience into the squad with the signing of veteran Super League centre Jake Webster from Castleford Tigers on a 2 Year Deal. Prop James Green who was on loan from Castleford Tigers signed a 1 Year Deal with the Bulls after a successful loan spell.

=== September 2018 ===
Centre Ashley Gibson signed a 1 Year extension to his contract. Welsh international winger Dalton Grant also signed a 1 Year extension after scoring 18 tries in the previous season. It was also announced that former prop forward Jon Magrin would return to the club after a year with the Sheffield Eagles. Academy products Alix Stephenson (fullback), Elliot Culling (centre) and Thomas Doyle (hooker) all signed contracts for the first team following in the footsteps of Oliver Wilson, Matthew Storton, Rowan Milnes and Evan Hodgson. Young Hunslet R.L.F.C. winger David Foggin-Johnston agreed to sign a 1 Year Deal at the Bulls. Home grown fullback Brandon Pickersgill signed a 2 Year extension to stay at the Bulls until the end of 2020.

=== October 2018 ===
Young hooker and academy product Reiss Butterworth signed for Super League side Huddersfield Giants on a 3-year deal after not featuring for the Bradford side in 2018. 2018 loanee Mikey Wood also put pen to paper on a permanent deal as he signed a 1 Year contract to join the Bulls for 2019 from the Huddersfield Giants. Continuing to recruit for the new season the Bulls announced the capture of seasoned hooker/halfback Matty Wildie on a 1 Year Deal from RFL Championship side Featherstone Rovers. Following this, the Bulls announced that hooker Vila Halafihi had departed the club later to sign a 1-year deal at Hunslet R.L.F.C. Further good news was released by the club as winger Jy Hitchcox signed a 2 Year Deal with the club from Castleford Tigers despite interest from Toronto Wolfpack and London Broncos. Bradford re-signed free scoring back rower Elliot Minchella for 3 years on a full-time deal keeping him at Odsal Stadium until the end of the 2021 season. Further recruitment in the pack came in the form of Featherstone Rovers second rower Connor Farrell who signed a 2 Year Deal to play for Bradford. Captain and workhorse prop Steve Crossley signed a new 2 Year Deal with the Bulls. In a double coup for the club Joe Keyes signed a full time 2 Year Deal with the club, whilst out of contract halfback Dane Chisholm also signed up for 1 Year.

=== November 2018 ===
The month started off with the announcement that the Bulls would host RFL Championship rivals York City Knights on Boxing Day. It was also revealed that the Bulls would face Super League side Huddersfield Giants on 13 January 2019 for Michael Lawrence's testimonial. The fixtures for the 2019 campaign were also released and Bradford would kick off their return to the Championship with a home match against Featherstone Rovers, it was also revealed that the Bulls would take on local rivals Halifax R.L.F.C. in the 2019 Summer Bash at Bloomfield Road. Young backrower Danny King left the club and subsequently signed a 1 Year Deal with Dewsbury Rams. Former player and current Wales assistant coach Garreth Carvell was brought to the Bulls to continue working under John Kear as his assistant. Prop forward Jordan Andrade also left the Bulls to link up with Dewsbury on a 1 Year Deal.

=== December 2018 ===
December saw the Bulls sign ex Super League centre Rhys Evans on a 1 Year Deal from Leigh Centurions. Following this capture it was also revealed that the Yorkshire Cup would be resurrected after a 26-year absence in the form of a pre-season cup with Bradford, Batley Bulldogs, Dewsbury Rams, Featherstone Rovers, Halifax R.L.F.C., Hunslet R.L.F.C., Hunslet Club Parkside and York City Knights all participating. The Bulls will face Halifax at Odsal Stadium on 6 January. Bradford released their 2019 squad number with fullback Gregg McNally taking the number 1 shirt and new signings Jake Webster, Jy Hitchcox and Matty Wildie taking numbers 3, 5 and 9. During an interview owner Andrew Chalmers revealed that the Bulls would host Canadian side Toronto Wolfpack in a Friday night friendly on January 25. Young reserve player Harvey Burnett left the Bulls to join Dewsbury on a 1 Year Deal. The Bulls got their pre-season off to a winning start with a 20–12 victory over York.

=== January 2019 ===
The new year started off with the news that fullback Gregg McNally would be released on compassionate grounds in order to move closer to his home in Leigh to care for his ill wife. The Bulls beat local rivals Halifax R.L.F.C. 26–16 in the resurrected RFL Yorkshire Cup meaning they progressed to a semi final against Dewsbury Rams. Following this win Bradford announced that they would face Toronto Wolfpack in a friendly on the 25 January in the Transatlantic Cup. The Bulls revealed that trialist Trae O'Sullivan signed a permanent deal with the club after impressing coach John Kear against Halifax. The Yorkshire Cup run continued as Bradford defeated Dewsbury 20–18 in the semi-final earning their place in the first Yorkshire Cup final in over 25 years. The following day saw Bradford lose 56–12 to Super League side Huddersfield Giants in Michael Lawrence's testimonial, halfback Dane Chisholm scored a length of the field intercept try whilst new signing David Foggin-Johnston also crossed however the Super League side ran rampant as the Bulls finished the match with most of their Under 19's on the field. The Bulls claimed their first piece of silverware for the 2019 season as they won the Yorkshire Cup with a hard-fought 14–12 win against Batley Bulldogs. The month ended with the Bulls losing 48–12 to Toronto in the final pre-season friendly.

=== February 2019 ===
Bradford opened their 2019 Betfred Championship campaign with a hard-fought 17–16 win over Featherstone Rovers. The Bulls also signed Toronto Wolfpack prop forward Olsi Krasniqi on a one-month loan due to an injury crisis in the forward pack. Following their opening round victory the Bulls backed this up with a 31–12 win over Swinton Lions. The first loss of the season came in the form of a 24–10 defeat by Sheffield Eagles with prop forward James Green receiving a red card. The month finished on a sour note for the Bulls as they fell to a 24–14 home defeat by last seasons rivals York City Knights, winger Ethan Ryan scored a brace of tries.

== Milestones ==
- Round 1: Jake Webster, Rhys Evans, Matty Wildie and Connor Farrell made their debut for the Bulls.
- Round 1: Jake Webster scored his 1st try for the Bulls.
- Round 2: Matty Wildie and Rhys Evans scored their 1st try for the Bulls.
- Round 3: Olsi Krasniqi made his debut for the Bulls.
- Round 6: David Foggin-Johnston made his debut for the Bulls.
- Round 7: Connor Farrell and David Foggin-Johnston scored their 1st try for the Bulls.
- Round 7: Elliot Minchella kicked his 1st goal for the Bulls.
- Round 8: Ethan Ryan scored his 75th try and reached 300 points for the Bulls.
- Round 8: Rowan Milnes kicked his 1st goal for the Bulls.
- Round 9: Rowan Milnes scored his 1st try for the Bulls.
- Round 10: Ross Peltier made his 50th appearance for the Bulls.
- Round 12: Thomas Doyle made his debut for the Bulls.
- Round 12: Thomas Doyle scored his 1st try for the Bulls.
- Round 12: Ethan Ryan scored his 10th hat-trick for the Bulls.
- CCR6: Ross Oakes made his 50th appearance for the Bulls.
- CCR6: Dalton Grant scored his 25th try and reached 100 points for the Bulls.
- Round 15: Alix Stephenson made his debut for the Bulls.
- 1895 Cup round 2: Cameron Berry, Joe Brown, Ryan Butterworth, Elliot Culling, Keelan Foster, Bradley Gallagher, Cobi Green, Jake Lightowler, Ethan O'Hanlon and Ebon Scurr made their debuts for the Bulls.
- 1895 Cup round 2: Alix Stephenson kicked his 1st goal for the Bulls.
- Round 18: Elliot Minchella made his 50th appearance for the Bulls.
- Round 18: Joe Keyes reached 300 points for the Bulls.
- Round 19: Joe Keyes scored his 1st hat-trick for the Bulls.
- Round 19: Elliot Minchella scored his 5th hat-trick for the Bulls.
- Round 22: Ethan Ryan scored his 11th hat-trick for the Bulls.
- Round 24: Steve Crossley made his 100th appearance for the Bulls.
- Round 24: Mikey Wood made his 50th appearance for the Bulls.
- Round 26: Joe Keyes reached 400 points for the Bulls.
- Round 27: Dalton Grant scored his 2nd hat-trick for the Bulls.
- Round 27: Ethan Ryan kicked his 1st goal for the Bulls.

== Pre-season friendlies ==
LEGEND
Win
Draw
Loss

Bulls score is first.

Date	Competition	Vrs	H/A	Venue	Result	Score	Tries	Goals	Att	Report
26 December 2018	Pre Season	York City Knights	H	Odsal Stadium	W	20-12	Farrell, Hitchcox, Oakes, Wood	Chisholm 2/4	2,000 (Est.)	Report
6 January 2019	Yorkshire Cup R1	Halifax R.L.F.C.	H	Odsal Stadium	W	26-16	Flanagan (2), Minchella, Oakes, Ryan	Keyes 2/3, Lilley 1/2	3,341	Report
12 January 2019	Yorkshire Cup SF	Dewsbury Rams	H	Odsal Stadium	W	20-18	Minchella (2), Evans	Keyes 1/1, Milnes 2/2	1,235	Report
13 January 2019	Michael Lawrence Testimonial	Huddersfield Giants	A	John Smith's Stadium	L	12-56	Chisholm, Foggin-Johnston	Chisholm 2/2	1,653	Report
20 January 2019	Yorkshire Cup Final	Batley Bulldogs	A	Mount Pleasant	W	14-12	Oakes, Ryan	Milnes 1/1, Lilley 2/2	2,278	Report
26 January 2019	Pre Season	Toronto Wolfpack	H	Odsal Stadium	L	12-48	Webster (2)	Chisholm 2/2	Attendance	Report

== Player appearances ==
- Friendly games only

FB=Fullback	C=Centre	W=Winger	SO=Stand Off	SH=Scrum half	P=Prop	H=Hooker	SR=Second Row	LF=Loose forward	B=Bench

No	Player	1	2	3	4	5	6
1	Gregg McNally	x	x	x	x	x	x
2	Ethan Ryan	x	W	W	x	W	W
3	Jake Webster	x	C	x	C	B	C
4	Ashley Gibson	C	x	x	C	C	
5	Jy Hitchcox	W	x			B	x
6	Joe Keyes	x	SO	SH	x		
7	Dane Chisholm	SH	x	x	SO	x	SH
8	Liam Kirk	P	x	P	x	P	P
9	Matty Wildie	x	H	H	x	H	x
10	Steve Crossley					B	B
11	Matt Garside				SR	x	SR
12	Elliot Minchella	x	SR	SR	x	SR	
13	Mikey Wood	L	x	L	x	L	L
14	Jordan Lilley	B	SH	x	SH	SH	x
15	Callum Bustin	P	B	B			
16	James Green	x	B	P	x	B	B
17	Ross Peltier						
18	Sam Hallas	H	x	x	H	x	H
19	Jon Magrin	B	P	x	P	P	P
20	Brandon Pickersgill	FB	B	FB	x	FB	x
21	George Flanagan	x	B	B	x	B	Red card
22	Dalton Grant						
23	George Milton	x	L	x	L	B	x
24	David Foggin-Johnston	W	B	x	W	x	W
25	Connor Farrell	SR	x	SR	x	SR	x
26	Ross Oakes	C	B	C	x	C	C
27	Rowan Milnes	SO	x	SO	x	SH	SO
28	Evan Hodgson	B	x	B			SR
29	Matthew Storton	SR	SR	x	SR	B	B
30	Oliver Wilson	x	P				
31	Rhys Evans	x	C	C	x	W	x
n/a	Ryan Butterworth	x	x	x	W	x	x
n/a	Elliot Culling	B	x	B	B	x	B
n/a	Thomas Doyle	B	x	x	B	x	B
n/a	Keelan Foster	B	x	x	P	x	B
n/a	Bradley Gallagher	x	x	x	B	x	x
n/a	Cobi Green	x	x	B	B	x	B
n/a	Jake Lightowler	x	x	x	B	x	B
n/a	Luke Littlewood	x	x	x	B	x	x
n/a	Lochlan McGill	x	x	x	B	x	x
n/a	Ethan O'Hanlon	x	x	x	B	x	x
n/a	Trae O'Sullivan	x	B	B	x	x	B
n/a	Josh Rickett	B	W	W	x	x	B
n/a	Ebon Scurr	x	x	B	B	x	B
n/a	Sam Smith	x	x	x	B	x	x
n/a	Alix Stephenson	B	FB	x	FB	x	FB

= Injured

= Suspended

== Table ==
Pos	Team	Pld	W	D	L	PF	PA	PD	Pts	Qualification
1	Toronto Wolfpack	27	26	0	1	1010	356	+654	52	Play-off semi-final
2	Toulouse Olympique	27	20	0	7	877	446	+431	40	Play-off qualifying final
3	York City Knights	27	19	1	7	612	529	+83	39	Play-off qualifying final
4	Leigh Centurions	27	18	0	9	792	558	+234	36	Play-off elimination final
5	Featherstone Rovers	27	17	0	10	837	471	+366	34	Play-off elimination final
6	Bradford Bulls	27	16	1	10	717	522	+195	33	
7	Sheffield Eagles	27	15	0	12	748	694	+54	30	
8	Halifax	27	10	1	16	602	685	−83	21	
9	Swinton Lions	27	10	1	16	619	803	−184	21	
10	Batley Bulldogs	27	8	1	18	462	756	−294	17	
11	Widnes Vikings	27	14	0	13	646	586	+60	16 (Note: Widnes deducted 12 points for going into administration.)	
12	Dewsbury Rams	27	6	2	19	513	721	−208	14	
13	Barrow Raiders	27	5	1	21	479	861	−382	11	Relegated to League 1
14	Rochdale Hornets	27	1	0	26	342	1268	−926	2	Relegated to League 1

== Fixtures and results ==
LEGEND
Win
Draw
Loss

2019 Championship

Date	Competition	Rnd	Vrs	H/A	Venue	Result	Score	Tries	Goals	Att	Live on TV	Report
3 February 2019	Championship	1	Featherstone Rovers	H	Odsal Stadium	W	17-16	Chisholm, Flanagan, Webster	Chisholm 2/4, Chisholm 1 DG	6,025	-	Report
10 February 2019	Championship	2	Swinton Lions	A	Heywood Road	W	31-12	Crossley, Evans, Minchella, Ryan, Wildie	Chisholm 5/6, Lilley 1 DG	1,498	-	Report
15 February 2019	Championship	3	Sheffield Eagles	A	Olympic Legacy Park	L	10-24	Oakes, Ryan	Lilley 1/2	1,711	Our League	Report
24 February 2019	Championship	4	York City Knights	H	Odsal Stadium	L	14-24	Ryan (2), Pickersgill	Chisholm 1/3	4,182	-	Report
3 March 2019	Championship	5	Toulouse Olympique	H	Odsal Stadium	L	0-14	-	-	3,751	-	Report
10 March 2019	Championship	6	Batley Bulldogs	A	Mount Pleasant	W	16-6	Kirk, Oakes, Ryan	Lilley 2/4	2,393	-	Report
17 March 2019	Championship	7	Widnes Vikings	A	Halton Stadium	L	20-25	Farrell, Foggin-Johnston, Hallas	Minchella 4/4	5,335	Our League	Report
24 March 2019	Championship	8	Leigh Centurions	H	Odsal Stadium	W	26-12	Evans, Ryan, Storton, Webster, Wildie	Minchella 2/5, Milnes 1/1	4,381	-	Report
7 April 2019	Championship	9	Dewsbury Rams	H	Odsal Stadium	W	20-12	Grant (2), Milnes, Minchella	Lilley 0/2, Minchella 2/2	4,068	Our League	Report
19 April 2019	Championship	10	Halifax R.L.F.C.	A	Shay Stadium	W	33-26	Crossley, Minchella, Ryan, Webster	Minchella 5/5, Milnes 3/3, Lilley 1 DG	3,316	-	Report
22 April 2019	Championship	11	Barrow Raiders	H	Odsal Stadium	W	26-14	Farrell, Grant, Lilley, Minchella, Webster	Minchella 3/5	4,011	-	Report
28 April 2019	Championship	12	Rochdale Hornets	H	Odsal Stadium	W	52-16	Ryan (3), Crossley (2), Doyle (2), Grant, Oakes	Minchella 8/9	3,721	-	Report
4 May 2019	Championship	13	Toronto Wolfpack	A	Lamport Stadium	L	16-36	Grant, Milnes, Peltier	Minchella 2/3	8,363	Sky Sports	Report
18 May 2019	Summer Bash	14	Halifax R.L.F.C.	N	Bloomfield Road	L	14-21	Foggin-Johnston, Grant	Minchella 3/4	7,912	Sky Sports	Report
26 May 2019	Championship	15	Featherstone Rovers	A	Post Office Road	L	4-42	Ryan	Minchella 0/1	2,903	-	Report
9 June 2019	Championship	16	Batley Bulldogs	H	Odsal Stadium	W	16-0	Foggin-Johnston (2), Minchella	Lilley 2/3	3,414	-	Report
16 June 2019	Championship	17	Leigh Centurions	A	Leigh Sports Village	L	20-52	Flanagan, Storton, Wildie	Lilley 4/4	4,180	Our League	Report
23 June 2019	Championship	18	Halifax R.L.F.C.	H	Odsal Stadium	W	24-20	Hitchcox (2), Minchella, Ryan	Keyes 4/5	5,350	Our League	Report
30 June 2019	Championship	19	Widnes Vikings	H	Odsal Stadium	W	62-0	Keyes (3), Minchella (3), Flanagan (2), Hitchcox, Oakes, Pickersgill	Keyes 9/11	3,895	-	Report
6 July 2019	Championship	20	Toulouse Olympique	A	Stade Ernest-Argeles	W	26-24	Keyes, Oakes, Pickersgill, Webster, Wildie	Keyes 3/5	3,560	-	Report
14 July 2019	Championship	21	Swinton Lions	H	Odsal Stadium	D	34-34	Farrell, Garside, Lilley, Pickersgill, Storton, Webster	Keyes 5/6	Attendance	-	Report
21 July 2019	Championship	22	York City Knights	A	Bootham Crescent	L	24-25	Ryan (3), Hitchcox, Oakes	Keyes 2/6	4,554	-	Report
4 August 2019	Championship	23	Toronto Wolfpack	H	Odsal Stadium	L	20-25	Crossley, Hitchcox, Webster	Keyes 4/4	Attendance	Sky Sports	Report
11 August 2019	Championship	24	Barrow Raiders	A	Craven Park	W	46-22	Minchella (2), Flanagan, Garside, Keyes, Oakes, Pickersgill, Ryan	Keyes 7/9	Attendance	-	Report
18 August 2019	Championship	25	Dewsbury Rams	A	Crown Flatt	W	34-10	Crossley, Minchella, Oakes, Peltier, Pickersgill, Wildie	Keyes 5/6	2,285	-	Report
1 September 2019	Championship	26	Sheffield Eagles	H	Odsal Stadium	W	30-10	Evans, Keyes, Peltier, Pickersgill, Ryan, Webster	Keyes 3/5, Lilley 0/1	7,531	-	Report
8 September 2019	Championship	27	Rochdale Hornets	A	Spotland Stadium	W	82-0	Grant (3), Keyes (2), Farrell, Green, Lilley, Oakes, Peltier, Pickersgill, Ryan, Storton, Webster, Wildie	Keyes 10/14, Ryan 1/1	Attendance	-	Report

== Player appearances ==
- Championship only

FB=Fullback	C=Centre	W=Winger	SO=Stand-off	SH=Scrum half	PR=Prop	H=Hooker	SR=Second Row	L=Loose forward	B=Bench

No	Player	1	2	3	4	5	6	7	8	9	10	11	12	13	14	15	16	17	18	19	20	21	22	23	24	25	26	27
1	Brandon Pickersgill	FB	FB	FB	FB	FB	FB	FB	x	x	x	FB	x	B	x	W	x	x	FB	FB	FB	FB	x	FB	FB	FB	FB	FB
2	Ethan Ryan	W	W	W	W	W	W	W	FB	FB	FB	W	FB	FB	FB	FB	FB	FB	W	W	W	W	W	W	W	W	W	W
3	Jake Webster	C	C		C	C	SR		C	C	C	C	C	x	C		C		C	C	C	C	C	C	B	B	C	C
4	Ashley Gibson					C			B									C					x	x	x	x	x	x
5	Jy Hitchcox	W	W	W	W														W	W	W	W	W	W	W	W	W	
6	Joe Keyes																		SO	SO	SO	SO	SO	SO	SO	SO	SO	SO
7	Dane Chisholm	SH	SH	x	SH						– (Note: On Loan at Featherstone Rovers)				– (Note: Joined Featherstone Rovers)													
8	Liam Kirk	P	P	P	P	P	B	P	P	P	P	P	P	P	P	P	P	P		P	P	P		P				
9	Matty Wildie	H	H	H	H	SH	SH	SH	SH	H	H	B	H	x	B	SH	SH	SH			B	H	H	H	H	H	B	B
10	Steve Crossley	P	P	P	P	P	P	P	P	P	P	P	P	P	P	P		P	P				P	P	P	P	P	P
11	Matt Garside	x	x	B	SR	SR	x	SR	x	x	x	x	x	x	x	x	x	SR	SR	SR	SR	SR		SR	SR	SR	x	x
12	Elliot Minchella	SR	SR	SR	SR	SO		SO	L	L	L	C	L	C	SR	C	L	L	L	L	L	L	L	L	L	L	L	L
13	Mikey Wood	B	B	x	x	L	L	L	B	B		L	B	L	L	L	B	B	B	B	B	x	B	B	B		B	B
14	Jordan Lilley	SO	SO	SO	SO	Red card	SO			SO	SO	SO	SO	SO	SO	SO	SO	SO	SH	SH	SH	SH	SH	SH	SH	SH	SH	SH
15	Callum Bustin					B	P	B	x	B	B	x	x	x	x	x	P	x	x	B	B	x	x	x	x	x	x	x
16	James Green	B	B	B	Red card	Red card	B	B	B		B	x	B	B	B	B								B	B	P	P	P
17	Ross Peltier										B	B	x	B	x		B	B	B	B	B	B	B			B	B	B
18	Sam Hallas	L	L	x	L	H	H	H	H	B	B	H	x	H	H	H	H	H	H	H	H	B	P		P	B	H	H
19	Jon Magrin		x	L	x	x	x	x	x	x	– (Note: On Loan at London Skolars)						x	B	P	P	P	P	x	– (Note: On Loan at London Skolars)				
21	George Flanagan	B	B	B	B	B	B	B	B	B						B	B	B	B	B	Red card	Red card	B	B	B	Red card	Red card	Red card
22	Dalton Grant									W	W	W	W	W	W		W	W	x	x	x	x	x	x	x	x	x	W
23	George Milton	x	x	x	x	x	x	x	x	x	x	x	x	x	x	x	x	x	x	x	x	x	x	x	x	x	x	x
24	David Foggin-Johnston	x	x	x	x	x	W	W	W	W	W		W	W	W	W	W	W							x	x	x	x
25	Connor Farrell	SR	SR	SR	B	SR	SR	SR	SR	SR	SR	SR	SR	SR	B	SR	SR		SR	SR	SR	SR	SR		SR	SR	SR	SR
26	Ross Oakes	B	B	C	x	B	C	C	C	x	C	x	C	C	C	C	C	C	C	C	C	C	C	C	C	C	C	C
27	Rowan Milnes	x	x	SH					SO	SH	SH	SH	SH	SH	SH													
28	Evan Hodgson	x	x	x	x	x	x	x	x	x	x	B	x	x	x	x	x	x	x	x	x	x	x	x	x	x	x	x
29	Matthew Storton	x	x	x	B	B	B	B	SR	SR	SR	SR	SR	SR	SR	SR	SR	SR	B	x	x	B	SR	SR			SR	SR
30	Oliver Wilson							x	x	– (Note: Joined Huddersfield Giants)																		
31	Rhys Evans	C	C	C	C	W	C	C	W	C													B	B	C	C	B	B
32	Colton Roche	–										B	B	x	B	B	B			x	x		x	x	x	x	x	x
33	Thomas Doyle	x	x	x	x	x	x	x	x	x	x	x	B	B	x	x	x	x	x	x	x	B	x	x	x	B	x	x
34	Joe Brown	x	x	x	x	x	x	x	x	x	x	x	x	x	x	x	x	x	x	x	x	x	FB					
n/a	Olsi Krasniqi	–	x	B	B	– (Note: Returned to Toronto Wolfpack)																						
n/a	Elliot Culling	x	x	x	x	x	x	x	x	x	x	x	x	x	x	x	x	x	x	x	x	x	x	x	x	x	x	x
n/a	Josh Rickett	x	x	x	x	x	x	x	x	x	x	x	x	x	x	x	x	x	x	x	x	x	x	x	x	x	x	x
n/a	Alix Stephenson	x	x	x	x	x	x	x	x	x	x	x	x	x	x	B	x	x	x	x	x	x	x	x	x	x	x	x

= Injured

= Suspended

== Challenge Cup ==
LEGEND
Win
Draw
Loss

Date	Competition	Rnd	Vrs	H/A	Venue	Result	Score	Tries	Goals	Att	TV	Report
31 March 2019	Cup	4th	Keighley Cougars	A	Cougar Park	W	14-12	Flanagan, Ryan	Minchella 3/4	2,912	BBC Sport	Report
14 April 2019	Cup	5th	Featherstone Rovers	H	Odsal Stadium	W	27-26 (AET)	Foggin-Johnston, Grant, Lilley, Ryan	Minchella 5/5, Lilley 1 DG	1,691	-	Report
11 May 2019	Cup	6th	Leeds Rhinos	H	Odsal Stadium	W	24-22	Grant, Hallas, Webster, Wood	Minchella 0/2, Milnes 4/4	10,258	BBC One	Report
2 June 2019	Cup	QF	Halifax R.L.F.C.	H	Odsal Stadium	L	16-20	Milnes, Webster, Wildie	Minchella 0/2, Lilley 2/3	6,591	BBC One	Report

== Player appearances ==
- Challenge Cup games only

FB=Fullback	C=Centre	W=Winger	SO=Stand Off	SH=Scrum half	P=Prop	H=Hooker	SR=Second Row	L=Loose forward	B=Bench

No	Player	4	5	6	QF
1	Brandon Pickersgill	SO	x	x	x
2	Ethan Ryan	FB	FB	FB	FB
3	Jake Webster	x	B	C	C
4	Ashley Gibson	C	x	x	x
5	Jy Hitchcox				
6	Joe Keyes				
7	Dane Chisholm		– (Note: On Loan at Featherstone Rovers)		– (Note: Joined Featherstone Rovers)
8	Liam Kirk	x	x	P	P
9	Matty Wildie	H	H	B	H
10	Steve Crossley	P	P	P	P
11	Matt Garside	SR	SR	x	x
12	Elliot Minchella	L	C	SR	SR
13	Mikey Wood	x	x	L	B
14	Jordan Lilley		SO	SO	SO
15	Callum Bustin	B	P	x	x
16	James Green		B	B	
17	Ross Peltier		B	B	B
18	Sam Hallas	x	L	H	L
19	Jon Magrin	B	x	– (Note: On Loan at London Skolars)	
21	George Flanagan	B	B		B
22	Dalton Grant	W	W	W	W
23	George Milton	x	x	x	x
24	David Foggin-Johnston	W	W	W	W
25	Connor Farrell	x	SR	SR	SR
26	Ross Oakes	C	C	C	C
27	Rowan Milnes	SH	SH	SH	SH
28	Evan Hodgson	B	x	x	x
29	Matthew Storton	SR	x	B	B
30	Oliver Wilson	P	– (Note: Joined Huddersfield Giants)		
31	Rhys Evans	x			
32	Colton Roche	–		x	x
33	Thomas Doyle	x	x	x	x
n/a	Elliot Culling	x	x	x	x
n/a	Josh Rickett	x	x	x	x
n/a	Alix Stephenson	x	x	x	x

== 1895 Cup ==
LEGEND
Win
Draw
Loss

Date	Competition	Rnd	Vrs	H/A	Venue	Result	Score	Tries	Goals	Att	TV	Report
5 June 2019	Cup	2nd	Barrow Raiders	A	Craven Park	L	6-50	Pickersgill	Stephenson 1/1	1,161	Our League	Report

== Player appearances ==
- 1895 Cup games only

FB=Fullback	C=Centre	W=Winger	SO=Stand Off	SH=Scrum half	P=Prop	H=Hooker	SR=Second Row	L=Loose forward	B=Bench

No	Player	2
1	Brandon Pickersgill	SO
2	Ethan Ryan	x
3	Jake Webster	x
4	Ashley Gibson	
5	Jy Hitchcox	
6	Joe Keyes	
7	Dane Chisholm	– (Note: Joined Featherstone Rovers)
8	Liam Kirk	x
9	Matty Wildie	x
10	Steve Crossley	x
11	Matt Garside	x
12	Elliot Minchella	x
13	Mikey Wood	x
14	Jordan Lilley	x
15	Callum Bustin	P
16	James Green	
17	Ross Peltier	x
18	Sam Hallas	x
19	Jon Magrin	P
21	George Flanagan	x
22	Dalton Grant	x
23	George Milton	x
24	David Foggin-Johnston	x
25	Connor Farrell	x
26	Ross Oakes	x
27	Rowan Milnes	
28	Evan Hodgson	x
29	Matthew Storton	x
30	Oliver Wilson	– (Note: Joined Huddersfield Giants)
31	Rhys Evans	
32	Colton Roche	SR
33	Thomas Doyle	H
n/a	Cameron Berry	B
n/a	Joe Brown	FB
n/a	Ryan Butterworth	C
n/a	Elliot Culling	C
n/a	Keelan Foster	B
n/a	Bradley Gallagher	SR
n/a	Cobi Green	SH
n/a	Jake Lightowler	B
n/a	Ethan O'Hanlon	B
n/a	Josh Rickett	W
n/a	Ebon Scurr	L
n/a	Alix Stephenson	W

== Squad statistics ==
- Appearances and points include (Super League, Challenge Cup and Play-offs) as of 8 September 2019.

No	Player	Position	Age	Previous club	Apps	Tries	Goals	DG	Points
1	Brandon Pickersgill	Fullback	21	Bradford Bulls Academy	21	9	0	0	36
2	Ethan Ryan	Wing	22	Bradford Bulls Academy	31	20	1	0	82
3	Jake Webster	Centre	35	Castleford Tigers	25	11	0	0	44
4	Ashley Gibson	Centre	32	Wakefield Trinity	4	0	0	0	0
5	Jy Hitchcox	Wing	29	Castleford Tigers	13	5	0	0	20
6	Joe Keyes	Stand off	23	London Broncos	10	8	52	0	136
7	Dane Chisholm	Scrum half	28	Sheffield Eagles	3	1	8	1	21
8	Liam Kirk	Prop	21	Bradford Bulls Academy	23	1	0	0	4
9	Matty Wildie	Hooker	28	Featherstone Rovers	28	7	0	0	28
10	Steve Crossley	Prop	29	Toronto Wolfpack	27	6	0	0	24
11	Matt Garside	Second row	28	London Broncos	14	2	0	0	8
12	Elliot Minchella	Second row	23	Sheffield Eagles	30	12	37	0	122
13	Mikey Wood	Loose forward	22	Huddersfield Giants	24	1	0	0	4
14	Jordan Lilley	Scrum half	22	Leeds Rhinos (Loan)	27	4	11	3	41
15	Callum Bustin	Prop	21	Castleford Tigers	11	0	0	0	0
16	James Green	Prop	28	Castleford Tigers	18	1	0	0	4
17	Ross Peltier	Prop	26	Keighley Cougars	16	4	0	0	16
18	Sam Hallas	Hooker	22	Leeds Rhinos	27	2	0	0	8
19	Jon Magrin	Prop	24	Sheffield Eagles	8	0	0	0	0
21	George Flanagan	Hooker	32	Hunslet R.L.F.C.	20	6	0	0	24
22	Dalton Grant	Wing	28	London Broncos	13	11	0	0	44
23	George Milton	Loose forward	n/a	Hull Kingston Rovers	0	0	0	0	0
24	David Foggin-Johnston	Wing	22	Hunslet R.L.F.C.	15	5	0	0	20
25	Connor Farrell	Second row	25	Featherstone Rovers	28	4	0	0	16
26	Ross Oakes	Centre	22	Bradford Bulls Academy	28	9	0	0	36
27	Rowan Milnes	Scrum half	19	Bradford Bulls Academy	12	3	8	0	28
28	Evan Hodgson	Second row	21	Bradford Bulls Academy	2	0	0	0	0
29	Matthew Storton	Second row	19	Bradford Bulls Academy	23	4	0	0	16
30	Oliver Wilson	Prop	18	Bradford Bulls Academy	1	0	0	0	0
31	Rhys Evans	Centre	26	Leigh Centurions	15	3	0	0	12
32	Colton Roche	Second row	26	Huddersfield Giants (Loan)	6	0	0	0	0
33	Thomas Doyle	Hooker	20	Bradford Bulls Academy	5	2	0	0	8
34	Joe Brown	Fullback	0	Wigan Warriors	2	0	0	0	0
n/a	Olsi Krasniqi	Prop	26	Toronto Wolfpack (Loan)	2	0	0	0	0
n/a	Cameron Berry	Hooker	0	Bradford Bulls Academy	1	0	0	0	0
n/a	Ryan Butterworth	Centre	0	Bradford Bulls Academy	1	0	0	0	0
n/a	Elliot Culling	Centre	0	Bradford Bulls Academy	1	0	0	0	0
n/a	Keelan Foster	Prop	0	Bradford Bulls Academy	1	0	0	0	0
n/a	Bradley Gallagher	Second row	0	Bradford Bulls Academy	1	0	0	0	0
n/a	Cobi Green	Scrum half	0	Bradford Bulls Academy	1	0	0	0	0
n/a	Jake Lightowler	Prop	0	Bradford Bulls Academy	1	0	0	0	0
n/a	Ethan O'Hanlon	Loose forward	0	Bradford Bulls Academy	1	0	0	0	0
n/a	Josh Rickett	Wing	20	Bradford Bulls Academy	1	0	0	0	0
n/a	Ebon Scurr	Loose forward	0	Bradford Bulls Academy	1	0	0	0	0
n/a	Alix Stephenson	Fullback	0	Bradford Bulls Academy	2	0	1	0	2

== Transfers ==
=== In ===
	Name	Position	Signed from	Date
(England)	Callum Bustin	Prop	Castleford Tigers	August 2018
(Australia)	Jake Webster	Centre	Castleford Tigers	August 2018
(England)	James Green	Prop	Castleford Tigers	August 2018
(Malta)	Jon Magrin	Prop	Sheffield Eagles	September 2018
(England)	David Foggin-Johnston	Wing	Hunslet R.L.F.C.	September 2018
(England)	Mikey Wood	Loose forward	Huddersfield Giants	October 2018
(England)	Matty Wildie	Hooker	Featherstone Rovers	October 2018
(Australia)	Jy Hitchcox	Wing	Castleford Tigers	October 2018
(England)	Connor Farrell	Second row	Featherstone Rovers	October 2018
(Wales)	Rhys Evans	Centre	Leigh Centurions	December 2018
(Albania)	Olsi Krasniqi	Prop	Toronto Wolfpack (Loan)	January 2019
(England)	Colton Roche	Second row	Huddersfield Giants (Loan)	April 2019
(England)	Colton Roche	Second row	Huddersfield Giants	May 2019
(England)	Joe Brown	Fullback	Wigan Warriors	May 2019

=== Out ===
	Name	Position	Club Signed	Date
(England)	James Davies	Prop	Huddersfield RUFC	August 2018
(England)	Reiss Butterworth	Hooker	Huddersfield Giants	October 2018
(England)	Vila Halafihi	Hooker	Hunslet R.L.F.C.	October 2018
(England)	Danny King	Second row	Dewsbury Rams	November 2018
(England)	Lee Smith	Centre	Released	November 2018
(England)	Jordan Andrade	Prop	Dewsbury Rams	November 2018
(England)	Harvey Burnett	Second row	Dewsbury Rams	December 2018
(England)	Gregg McNally	Fullback	Leigh Centurions	January 2019
(England)	Oliver Wilson	Prop	Huddersfield Giants	April 2019
(Malta)	Jon Magrin	Prop	London Skolars (Loan)	April 2019
(Australia)	Dane Chisholm	Scrum half	Featherstone Rovers (Loan)	April 2019
(Australia)	Dane Chisholm	Scrum half	Featherstone Rovers	May 2019
