= James Green (rugby league) =

English rugby league footballer

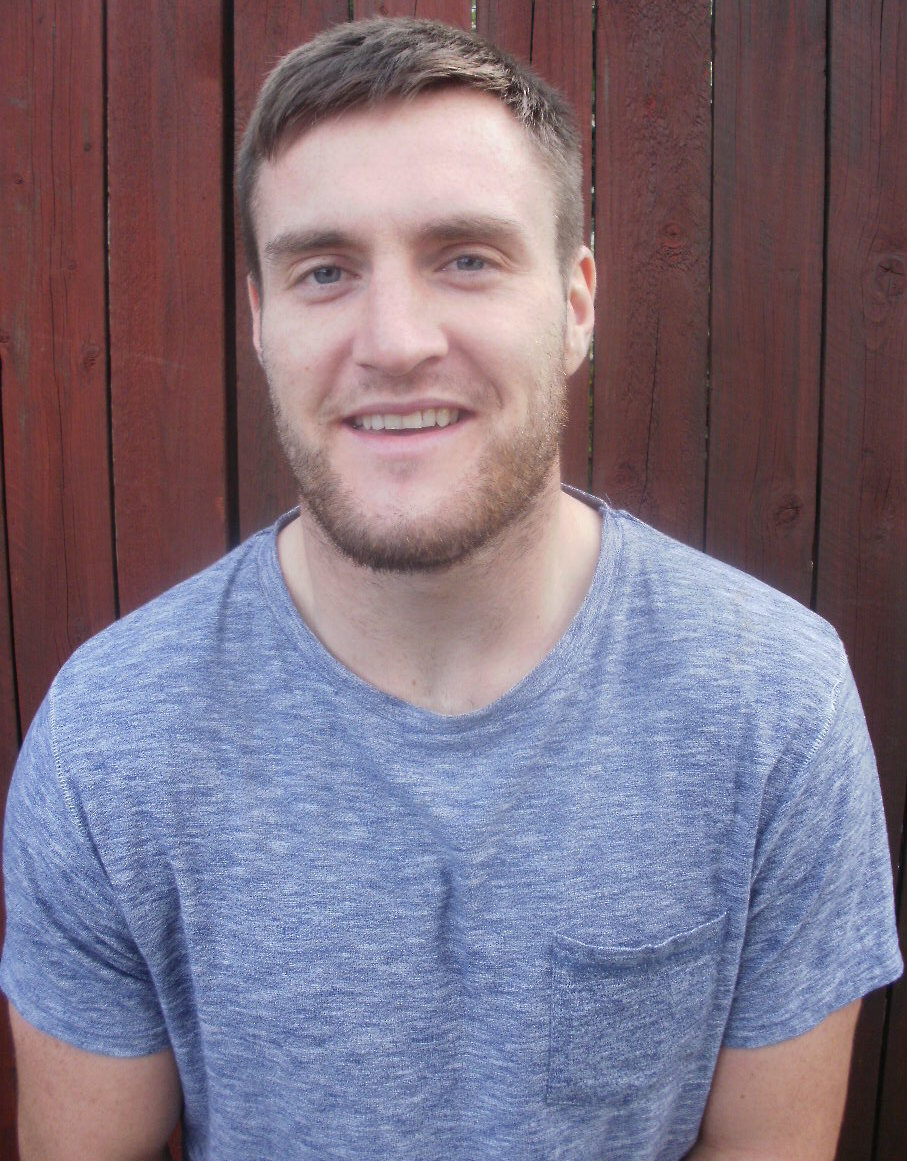

Personal information
- Born: 29 November 1990 (age 35) Beverley, East Riding of Yorkshire, England
- Height: 6 ft 6 in (1.98 m)
- Weight: 17 st 9 lb (112 kg)

Playing information
- Position: Prop
Club
| Years | Team | Pld | T | G | FG | P |
|---|---|---|---|---|---|---|
| 2012–16 | Hull Kingston Rovers | 81 | 3 | 0 | 0 | 12 |
| 2012(DR) | → Workington Town | 3 | 0 | 0 | 0 | 0 |
| 2012(DR) | → Batley Bulldogs | 9 | 0 | 0 | 0 | 0 |
| 2013(DR) | → Gateshead Thunder | 5 | 0 | 0 | 0 | 0 |
| 2017 | Leigh Centurions | 9 | 0 | 0 | 0 | 0 |
| 2017(DR) | → Sheffield Eagles | 2 | 0 | 0 | 0 | 0 |
| 2018 | Castleford Tigers | 4 | 0 | 0 | 0 | 0 |
| 2018(loan) | → Halifax | 7 | 0 | 0 | 0 | 0 |
| 2018(loan) | → Bradford Bulls | 11 | 1 | 0 | 0 | 4 |
| 2019 | Bradford Bulls | 18 | 2 | 0 | 0 | 8 |
| 2020–21 | York City Knights | 21 | 2 | 1 | 0 | 26 |
| | Total | 170 | 8 | 1 | 0 | 50 |
- Source: As of 29 December 2023

James Green (born 29 November 1990) is a rugby league footballer who played as prop for the York City Knights in the Championship.

He played for Hull Kingston Rovers in the Super League, and on loan from Hull KR at Workington Town and the Gateshead Thunder in Championship 1 and the Batley Bulldogs in the Championship. Green played for the Leigh Centurions in the Super League, and spent time on loan from Leigh at the Sheffield Eagles in the Championship. He has also played for the Castleford Tigers in the top flight, and on loan from Castleford at Halifax in the second tier, and the Bradford Bulls in League 1. Green later joined Bradford on a permanent deal in the Championship.

== Background ==
Green was born in Beverley, East Riding of Yorkshire, England.

== Playing career ==
Green was born in Beverley near Hull, East Riding of Yorkshire but brought up in Hull, he first played rugby league at the age of 7, he played for the West Hull youth side. He later moved to the Skirlaugh Bulls before turning professional.

Green captained the reserve side at Hull Kingston Rovers, and led them to their first ever play-off place. Green was on dual registration with Workington Town in 2012, where he made 3 appearances. He made his début for Hull Kingston Rovers on 10 August 2012 against Bradford Bulls during which he was injured, placed on report and suspended as a result. He then spent the remainder of the season as a dual registered player with Batley, for who he made 9 appearances under the ex-international coach John Kear. During the 2013 season Green guested for Gateshead Thunder 5 times and Featherstone Rovers on 3 occasions, he also turned out 8 times for his parent club Hull Kingston Rovers. Green became a regular for Hull Kingston Rovers in the 2014 campaign, playing in 27 of their 28 fixtures, scoring his début try against Castleford on 28 February. Green was so impressive during the 2014 campaign that he scooped the "Young Player Of The Year Award" at the age of 23. Green will wear the number 20 jersey for the 2015 season.

On 6 May 2014, Green signed a new deal that will see him stay at Hull Kingston Rovers for another two seasons. Green continues to be valuable member of Hull Kingston Rovers first team squad, and featured on a further 25 occasions during the 2015 season. Green helped his side to a Challenge Cup Final appearance during 2015, the club's first since 1986. Green missed out on a Wembley place and was 18th man for the day. Green was expecting a big season in 2016, wearing the number 16 jersey. Green made a further 20 appearances for Hull Kingston Rovers during the 2016 season, scoring 2 tries, and picking up 1 yellow card and 1 red for fighting with ex-colleagues Travis Burns and Jordon Cox respectively. Green missed the last 7 games of 2016 with a shoulder injury, he has had successful surgery and is now in rehabilitation. He signed to play for newly promoted Leigh Centurions on a 2-year contract, which would keep him at Leigh for the 2017 and 2018 seasons. However, In November 2017 he signed a one-year deal with Castleford Tigers for the 2018 season.
