= Matthew Storton =

English professional rugby league footballer

Matty Storton
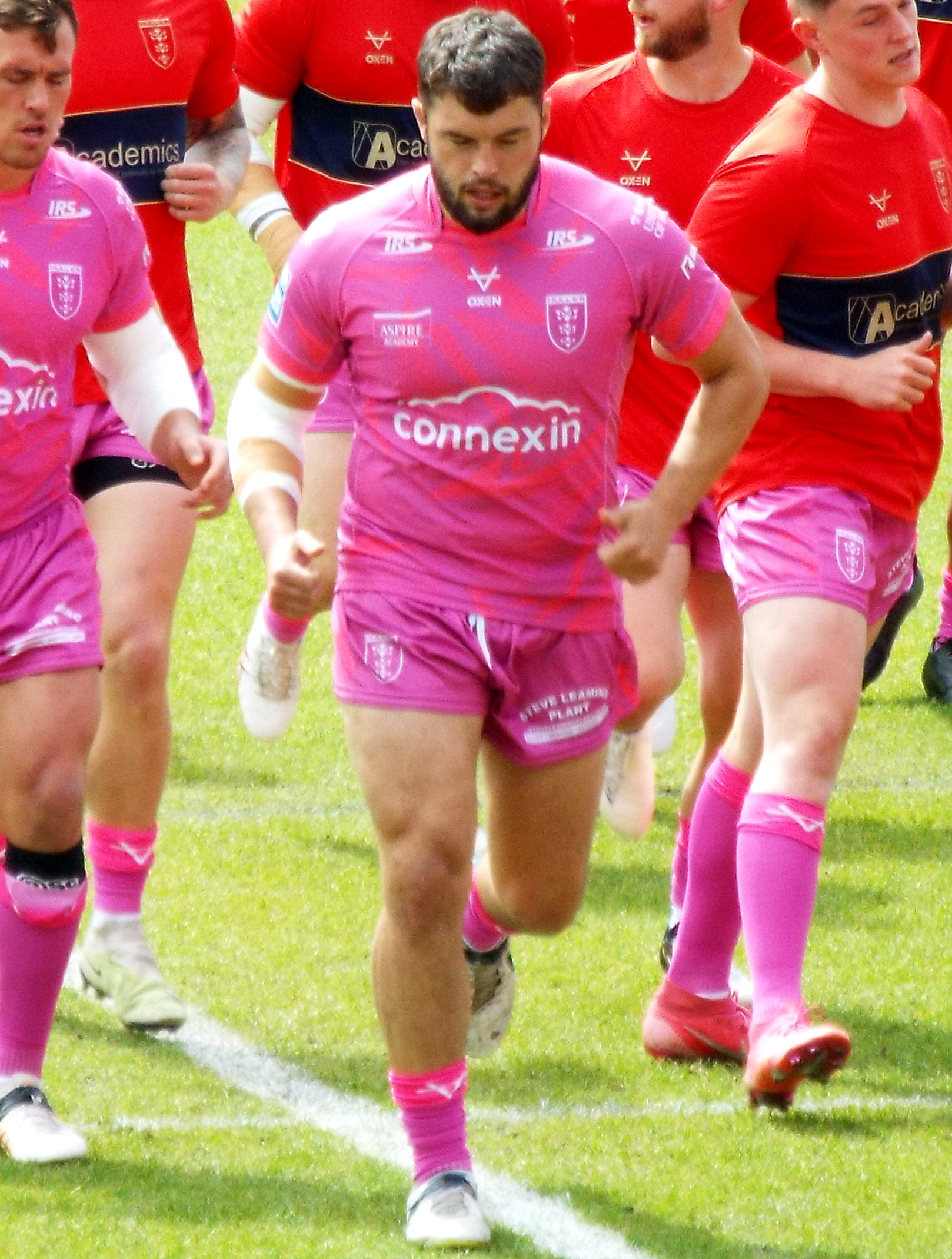

Personal information
- Full name: Matthew George Storton
- Born: 10 March 1999 (age 26) Keighley, West Yorkshire, England
- Height: 5 ft 11 in (1.80 m)
- Weight: 15 st 10 lb (100 kg)

Playing information
- Position: Second-row, Prop
Club
| Years | Team | Pld | T | G | FG | P |
|---|---|---|---|---|---|---|
| 2017–19 | Bradford Bulls | 29 | 8 | 0 | 0 | 32 |
| 2020–24 | Hull Kingston Rovers | 105 | 10 | 0 | 0 | 40 |
| 2025– | Wakefield Trinity | 13 | 4 | 0 | 0 | 16 |
| | Total | 147 | 22 | 0 | 0 | 88 |
- Source: As of 22 January 2026

Matty Storton (born 10 March 1999) is an English rugby league footballer who plays as a second-row and prop for Wakefield Trinity in the Super League.

He previously played for the Bradford Bulls in the Championship.

== Background ==
Storton was born in Keighley, West Yorkshire, England.

He is a product of the Bradford Bulls Academy system. He signed a professional contract with the Bulls prior to the 2018 season.

== Bradford Bulls ==
In the 2017 Bradford Bulls season, Storton featured in Round 12 (Toulouse Olympique).

In the 2018 season, he featured in the pre-season friendly against Dewsbury Rams.

He played in Round 24 (West Wales Raiders) to League 1 Final (Workington Town). He scored against West Wales Raiders (1 try), Oldham R.L.F.C. (1 try) and Hemel Stags (2 tries).

In the 2019 season, Storton featured in the pre-season friendlies against York City Knights, Halifax R.L.F.C., Huddersfield Giants, Batley Bulldogs and Toronto Wolfpack.

He played in Round 4 (York City Knights) to Round 18 (Halifax R.L.F.C.) then in Round 21 (Swinton Lions) to Round 23 (Toronto Wolfpack). He also played in Round 26 (Sheffield Eagles) to Round 27 (Rochdale Hornets). Storton also featured in the 2019 Challenge Cup in Round 4 (Keighley Cougars) then in Round 6 (Leeds Rhinos) to Quarter Final (Halifax R.L.F.C.). He scored against Leigh Centurions (2 tries), Swinton Lions (1 try) and Rochdale Hornets (1 try).

== Hull Kingston Rovers ==
Storton made 19 appearances for Hull KR in the 2021 Super League season including the club's 28-10 semi-final loss against the Catalans Dragons. On 12 August 2023, Storton played for Hull Kingston Rovers in their 17-16 golden point extra-time loss to Leigh in the Challenge Cup final. Storton played 21 games for Hull Kingston Rovers in the 2023 Super League season as the club finished fourth on the table and qualified for the playoffs. He played in the clubs semi-final loss against Wigan. On 12 October 2024, Storton played in Hull Kingston Rovers 2024 Super League Grand Final loss against Wigan.

== Wakefield Trinity ==
On 21 August 2024 it was reported that he had signed for Wakefield Trinity on a three-year deal. On the 22 January 2026 it was confirmed that he signed a 4 year contract extension bringing his contract to 2029

== Statistics ==
Statistics do not include pre-season friendlies.

| Season | Appearance | Tries | Goals | F/G | Points |
|---|---|---|---|---|---|
| 2017 Bradford Bulls | 1 | 0 | 0 | 0 | 0 |
| 2018 Bradford Bulls | 5 | 4 | 0 | 0 | 16 |
| 2019 Bradford Bulls | 23 | 4 | 0 | 0 | 16 |
| Total | 29 | 8 | 0 | 0 | 32 |
