= Ross Oakes =

English rugby league footballer

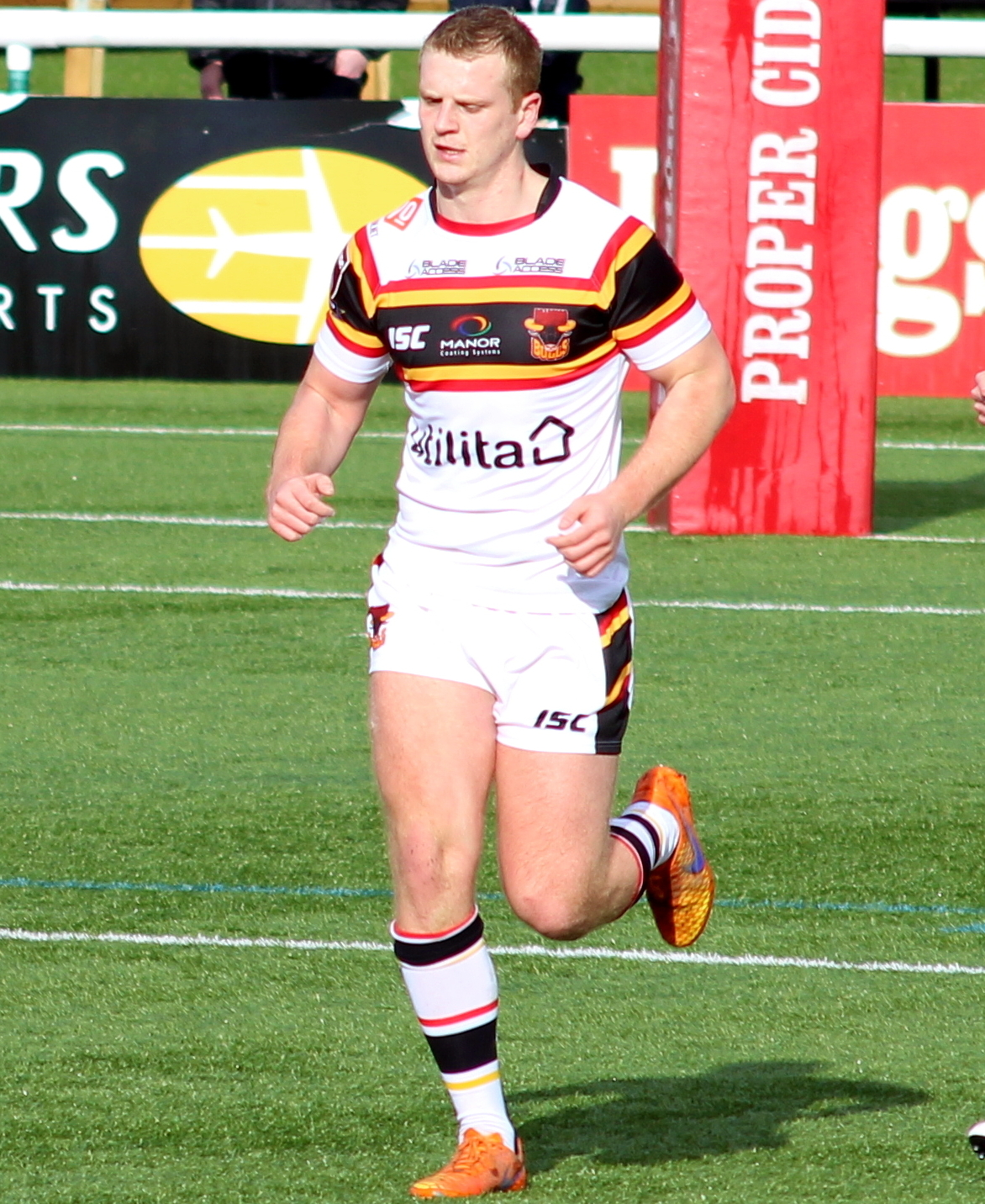

Personal information
- Born: 12 October 1996 (age 28); Bradford, West Yorkshire, England
- Height: 6 ft 1 in (1.86 m)
- Weight: 13 st 10 lb (87 kg)

Playing information
- Position: Centre
Club
Years	Team	Pld	T	G	FG	P
2016–21	Bradford Bulls	93	27	0	0	108
2022–23	Sheffield Eagles	39	11	0	0	44
2023(DR)	→ Midlands Hurricanes	1	1	0	0	4
2024–	Midlands Hurricanes	9	4	0	0	16
	Total	142	43	0	0	172
- Source: As of 18 May 2024

Ross Oakes (born 12 October 1996) is an English professional rugby league footballer who plays as a centre for Midlands Hurricanes in RFL League 1.

== Background ==
Oakes was born in Bradford, West Yorkshire, England.

He is a product of the Bradford Bulls Academy system and signed his first professional contract in October 2015. Oakes previously played for local amateur side Drighlington ARLFC.

== Bradford Bulls ==
2016 - 2016 Season

Oakes did not feature in any of the pre season friendlies.

He featured in round 10 against Dewsbury then in round 17 Workington Town. Oakes then played in the Championship Shield in Game 6 against Workington to the final against Sheffield.

2017 - 2017 Season

Oakes featured in the pre-season friendlies against Huddersfield and the Keighley Cougars.

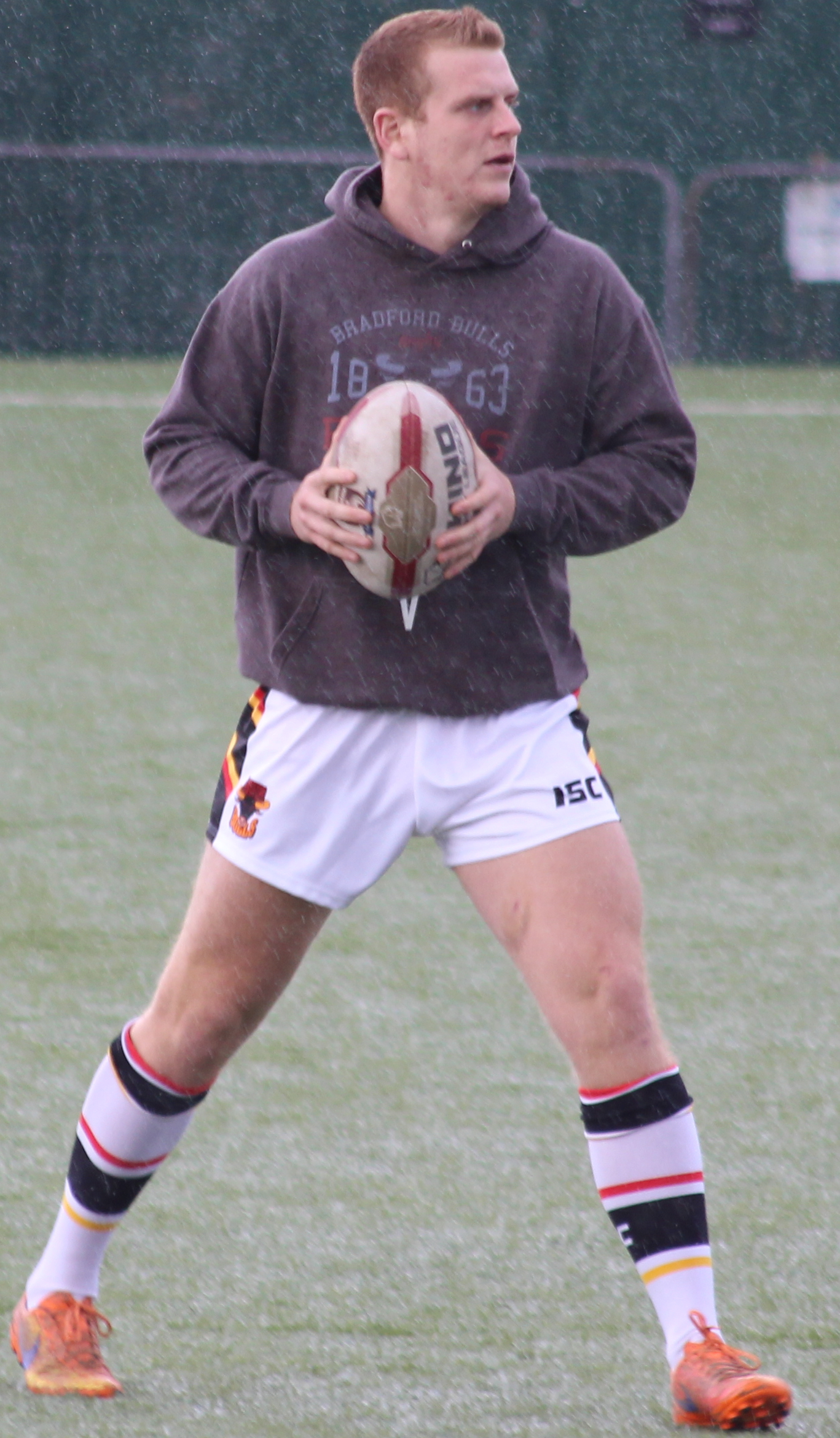
Oakes warming up for the Bradford Bulls in 2017

Oakes featured in round 1 Hull Kingston Rovers to round 13 against Sheffield then in round 17 game against Featherstone to round 19 Oldham. He also featured in the Championship Shield Game 7 Rochdale. Oakes also played in the 2017 Challenge Cup in round 4 against Featherstone. At the end of the season Oakes signed a two-year contract extension with the Bradford club.

2018 - 2018 Season

Oakes featured in the pre-season friendlies against Halifax R.L.F.C., Sheffield and Dewsbury

Oakes played in round 6 against Workington then in round 15 game against Coventry to round 22. He also played in round 26 Hemel Stags then in the final against Workington Town. Oakes played in the 2018 Challenge Cup in round 4 Hunslet R.L.F.C. to round 5 Warrington.

2019 - 2019 Season

Oakes featured in the pre-season friendly against the York City Knights.

Oakes featured in round 1 against Featherstone to round 3 against Sheffield then in round 5 Toulouse Olympique to round 8 Leigh. Oakes then played in round 10 against Halifax and round 12 Rochdale to round 27 Rochdale. Oakes also played in the 2019 Challenge Cup in round 4 Keighley to Quarter Final against Halifax. Following the financial problems in the off season, Oakes signed a new two-year deal at the Bradford club.

2020 - 2020 Season

Oakes featured in the pre-season friendlies against Castleford, Leeds, Dewsbury and York.

Oakes played in round 1 against the London Broncos to round 5 against Sheffield. Oakes also featured in the 2020 Challenge Cup in round 4 Underbank Rangers to round 5 Wakefield Trinity.

2021 - 2021 Season

Oakes featured in the pre-season friendly against Swinton.

Oakes played in round 1 against Sheffield to their round 9 game against Featherstone then in round 11 Widnes to elimination playoff against Batley. Oakes also featured in the 2021 Challenge Cup in round 1 Featherstone.

== Sheffield Eagles ==
In November 2021, Oakes joined Sheffield Eagles on a two-year deal.

== Statistics ==
Statistics do not include pre-season friendlies.

Season	Appearance	Tries	Goals	F/G	Points
2016 Bradford Bulls	6	4	0	0	16
2017 Bradford Bulls	18	10	0	0	40
2018 Bradford Bulls	13	1	0	0	4
2019 Bradford Bulls	28	9	0	0	36
2020 Bradford Bulls	6	0	0	0	0
2021 Bradford Bulls	22	3	0	0	12
Total	93	27	0	0	108
