= Brandon Pickersgill =

English rugby league footballer

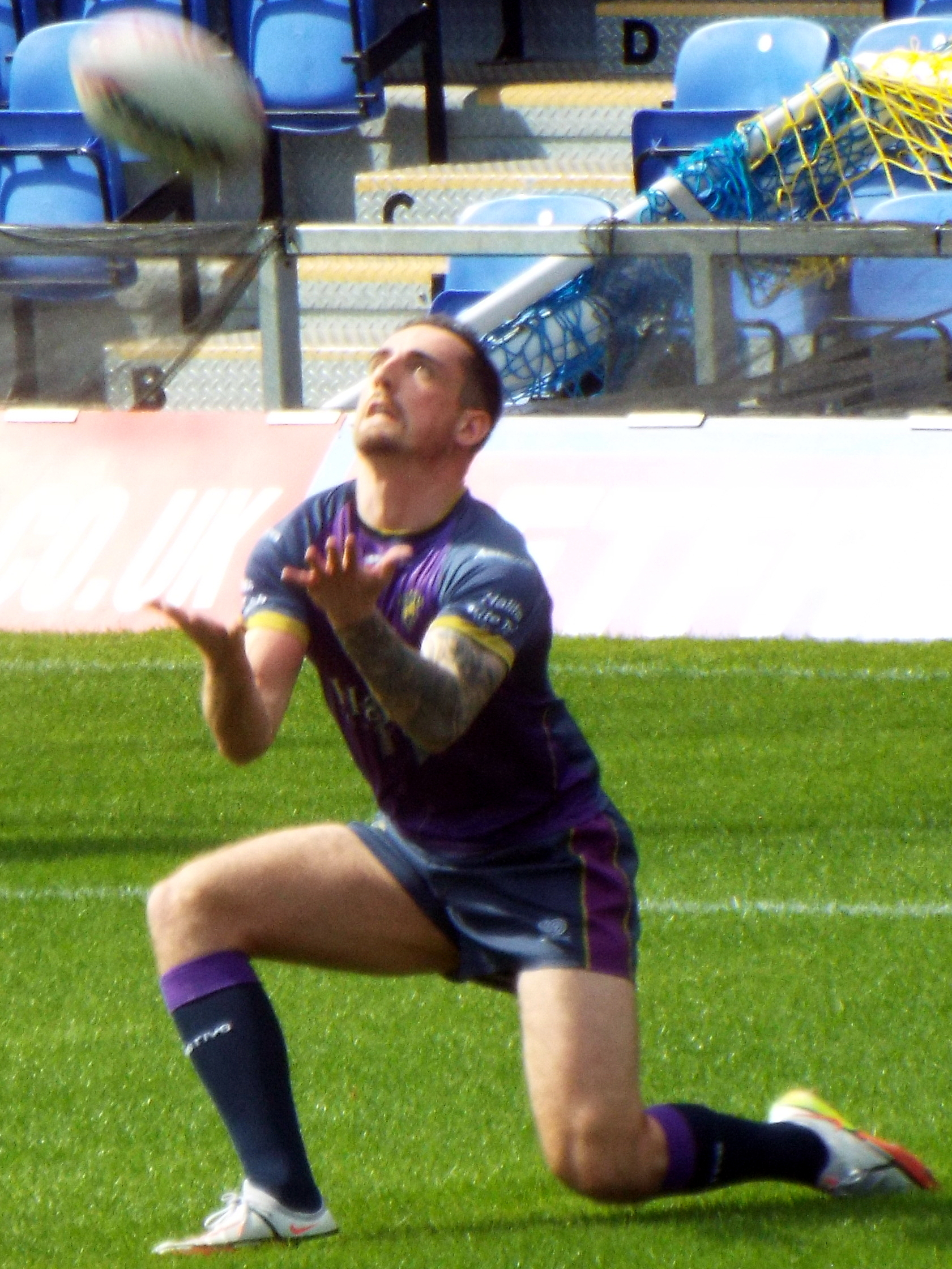

Personal information
- Full name: Brandon Pickersgill
- Born: 29 March 1997 (age 29) Bradford, West Yorkshire, England
- Height: 6 ft 0 in (183 cm)
- Weight: 13 st 5 lb (85 kg)

Playing information
- Position: Fullback, Stand-off
Club
Years	Team	Pld	T	G	FG	P
2017–21	Bradford Bulls	74	32	0	0	128
2017(loan)	→ London Skolars	1	0	0	0	0
2022–23	Featherstone Rovers	12	7	0	0	28
2022(loan)	→ Bradford Bulls	1	1	0	0	4
2023	Halifax Panthers	11	1	0	0	4
2024–	Keighley Cougars	26	10	0	0	40
2026	→ Hunslet RLFC (loan)	0	0	0	0	0
	Total	125	51	0	0	204
- Source: As of 4 September 2026

Brandon Pickersgill (born 29 March 1997) is an English professional rugby league footballer who plays as a fullback or stand-off for Hunslet RLFC on loan from Keighley Cougars in the RFL Championship.

== Background ==
Pickersgill was born in Bradford, West Yorkshire, England. He attended Bradford Academy in East Bowling.

He played out his junior years at Stanningley, East Leeds and Shaw Cross before linking up with Leeds Rhinos between the age of 15 and 16. He later went on to join the Bradford Bulls Academy.

He also represented the u17s BARLA Great Britain side.

== Playing career ==
=== Bradford Bulls ===
2017 - 2017 Season

Pickersgill featured in the pre-season friendlies against Huddersfield Giants and Keighley Cougars.

Pickersgill featured in round 12 against Toulouse Olympique and then in round 17 Featherstone Rovers. He also played in round 23 against the Swinton Lions. Pickersgill also featured in the Championship Shield Game 4 against Batley.

At the end of the season, Pickersgill signed a three-year contract extension with Bradford.

2018 - 2018 Season

Pickersgill featured in the pre-season friendlies against Halifax R.L.F.C., Sheffield Eagles, Dewsbury, Toronto Wolfpack and Keighley.

Pickersgill featured in round 1 against York RLFC to round 3 against Keighley then in round 6 Workington Town to round 15 Coventry Bears. He also featured in round 19 against the London Skolars to round 23 Keighley then in round 25 Oldham R.L.F.C. to round 26 Hemel Stags. Pickersgill also played in the 2018 Challenge Cup in round 3 game against the West Wales Raiders to round 5 Warrington. At the end of the season, Pickersgill signed a two-year extension.

2019 - 2019 Season

Pickersgill featured in the pre-season friendly against the York City Knights.

Pickersgill played in round 1 Featherstone Rovers to round 7 Widnes then in round 11 Barrow. Pickersgill also played in round 13 against Toronto then in round 15 against Featherstone. Pickersgill featured in round 18 against Halifax to their round 21 match against Swinton then in round 23 against Toronto to round 27 Rochdale Hornets. He also featured in the 2019 Challenge Cup in round 4 Keighley. Pickersgill played in the 2019 RFL 1985 Cup in against Barrow.

2020 - 2020 Season

Pickersgill featured in the pre-season friendlies against Castleford, Leeds and the York City Knights.

Pickersgill played in round 1 against the London Broncos to round 5 against Sheffield. Pickersgill also featured in the 2020 Challenge Cup in round 4 Underbank Rangers to round 5 Wakefield Trinity.

Pickersgill signed a one-year extension to stay at the Bradford club for the 2021 season.

2021 - 2021 Season

Pickersgill featured in the pre-season friendly against Swinton.

Pickersgill played in round 1 against Sheffield to their round 9 match against Featherstone then in round 11 Widnes to round 20 Toulouse Olympique. Pickersgill also featured in the 2021 Challenge Cup in Round 1 against Featherstone.

2022 - 2022 Season

It was announced that Pickersgill had returned to the Bradford Bulls on a short term loan deal. Pickersgill featured in Round 15 against Sheffield.

=== Featherstone Rovers ===
On 18 October 2021, it was reported that he had signed for Featherstone Rovers in the RFL Championship for the 2022 season.

=== Halifax Panthers ===
At the end of 2022, Pickersgill signed a contract to join RFL Championship side Halifax until the end of 2024.

=== Keighley Cougars ===
On 24 Nov 2023 it was reported that he had signed for Keighley Cougars in the RFL League 1.

=== Hunslet RLFC (loan) ===
On 17 April 2026 it was reported that he had signed for Hunslet RLFC in the RFL Championship on loan

=== Statistics ===
Statistics do not include pre-season friendlies.

Season	Appearance	Tries	Goals	F/G	Points
2017 Bradford Bulls	4	0	0	0	0
2018 Bradford Bulls	24	11	0	0	44
2019 Bradford Bulls	21	9	0	0	36
2020 Bradford Bulls	6	3	0	0	12
2021 Bradford Bulls	19	9	0	0	36
2022 Bradford Bulls	1	1	0	0	4
Total	75	33	0	0	132
