= 2018 RFL League 1 =

2018 League 1
- League: League 1
- Duration: 26 matches
- Teams: 14
- Highest attendance: 6,441 Bradford Bulls vs York City Knights (22 July)
- Lowest attendance: 108 Hemel Stags vs Doncaster (1 July)

2018 Season
- Champions: York City Knights
- Runners-up: Bradford Bulls
- Biggest home win: 144–0 York City Knights v West Wales Raiders (29 April)
- Biggest away win: 0–130 West Wales Raiders v York City Knights (11 August)
- Top point-scorer(s): Connor Robinson (York City Knights); 388 points (14 tries, 166 goals)
- Top try-scorer(s): Ethan Ryan (Bradford Bulls); 34 tries

The 2018 RFL League 1 was a professional rugby league football competition played in England and Wales and is the third tier of the sport for Rugby Football League (RFL) affiliated clubs.

Even before the end of the 2017 season there were news stories that two of the clubs in the league, Gloucestershire All Golds and Oxford were considering a merger and relocating to Bristol. Uncertainty around this move meant that the structure of League 1 for 2018 was undecided until October 2017 when the merger was confirmed by the RFL who also announced that the new Bristol side would not play in the league in 2018 and the league for 2018 will comprise only 14 clubs.

The format of the season was very different from the 2017 season. There was no Super 8s and the season was of 26 games with each of the 14 teams playing each other home and away. The team finishing top would win automatic promotion to the 2019 Championship and be named league champions for 2018. The teams finishing second to fifth would meet in two play-off semi-finals with the semi-final winners meeting in the League 1 Promotional Final. The winner of the Promotional Final will play in the Championship on 2019. Following a special general meeting of the Rugby Football League on 14 September 2018, the promotion criteria were changed to allow the expansion of the 2019 Championship from 12 clubs to 14 clubs. Two teams would be promoted as previously agreed however the loser of the Promotion Final would have a further chance at promotion in a single-leg play-off against the team finishing bottom of the Championship with the winner playing in the Championship for 2019.

Oldham and Bradford Bulls were relegated from the Championship in 2017. During the close season South Wales Ironmen re-branded as West Wales Raiders following the purchase of the club and a move from Merthyr Tydfil to Llanelli in 2017.

New sponsors for the league were announced in January 2018 and the league was known as the Betfred League 1, a name that will remain until the end of 2019 as the bookmakers, Betfred, extended their sponsorship of rugby league to include the Championship and League 1 as well as Super League.

York City Knights won automatic promotion to the 2019 Championship by beating Whitehaven on the last day of the season and ending the season two points ahead of nearest rivals, Bradford Bulls. Bradford were also promoted after beating Workington Town 27–8 in the promotion final on 7 October 2018. Defeat for Workington gave them a further shot at promotion in a promotion play-off final on 14 October against Swinton Lions, who finished last in the Championship Shield. Swinton had home advantage in the play-off final following a coin toss between the two clubs and retained their Championship status with a 33–20 victory consigning Workington to another season in League 1.

Post season West Wales Raiders were deducted four points for having fielded an ineligible player during two games; with the team having lost all of their fixtures during the season it meant that they ended the season on minus four points.

== Teams ==
Locations of the 2018 RFL League 1 teams

Colours	Club	City	Stadium	Capacity*
	Bradford Bulls	Bradford, West Yorkshire	Odsal Stadium	27,500
	Coventry Bears	Coventry, West Midlands	Butts Park Arena	4,000
	Doncaster	Doncaster, South Yorkshire	Keepmoat Stadium	15,231
	Hemel Stags	Hemel Hempstead, Hertfordshire	Pennine Way	2,000
	Hunslet	Leeds, West Yorkshire	South Leeds Stadium	4,000
	Keighley Cougars	Keighley, West Yorkshire	Cougar Park	7,800
	London Skolars	Haringey, London	New River Stadium	2,000
	Newcastle Thunder	Newcastle, Tyne and Wear	Kingston Park	10,200
	North Wales Crusaders	Wrexham, Wales	Queensway Stadium	2,000
	Oldham	Oldham, Greater Manchester	Whitebank Stadium	1,500
	West Wales Raiders	Llanelli, Wales	Stebonheath Park	3,700
	Whitehaven	Whitehaven, Cumbria	Recreation Ground	7,500
	Workington Town	Workington, Cumbria	Zebra Claims Stadium	10,000
	York City Knights	York, North Yorkshire	Bootham Crescent	8,256

*capacity for rugby league games may differ from official stadium capacity.

== Standings ==
Pos	Team	Pld	W	D	L	PF	PA	PD	Pts	Qualification
1	York City Knights	26	24	0	2	1130	308	+822	48	Champions
2	Bradford Bulls	26	23	0	3	1197	282	+915	46	Play-off semi-finals
3	Doncaster	26	19	0	7	956	497	+459	38	Play-off semi-finals
4	Workington Town	26	17	0	9	833	517	+316	34	Play-off semi-finals
5	Oldham	26	16	0	10	902	345	+557	32	Play-off semi-finals
6	Whitehaven	26	16	0	10	702	529	+173	32	
7	Hunslet	26	15	0	11	735	596	+139	30	
8	Newcastle Thunder	26	14	0	12	841	520	+321	28	
9	Keighley Cougars	26	13	0	13	841	657	+184	26	
10	North Wales Crusaders	26	9	1	16	589	660	−71	19	
11	Coventry Bears	26	7	0	19	406	1058	−652	14	
12	London Skolars	26	6	1	19	626	887	−261	13	
13	Hemel Stags	26	2	0	24	314	1286	−972	4	
14	West Wales Raiders	26	0	0	26	176	2106	−1930	−4 (Note: West Wales Raiders deducted four points post-season for fielding an ineligible player in two matches)	

== Play-offs ==
Play-off semi-finals
2	Bradford Bulls	47
5	Oldham	0
3	Doncaster	18
4	Workington Town	30

Promotion Final
Bradford Bulls	27
Workington Town	8

Promotion play-off
CS 8	Swinton Lions	33
Workington Town	20
