= Steve Crossley =

English rugby league footballer (born 1990)

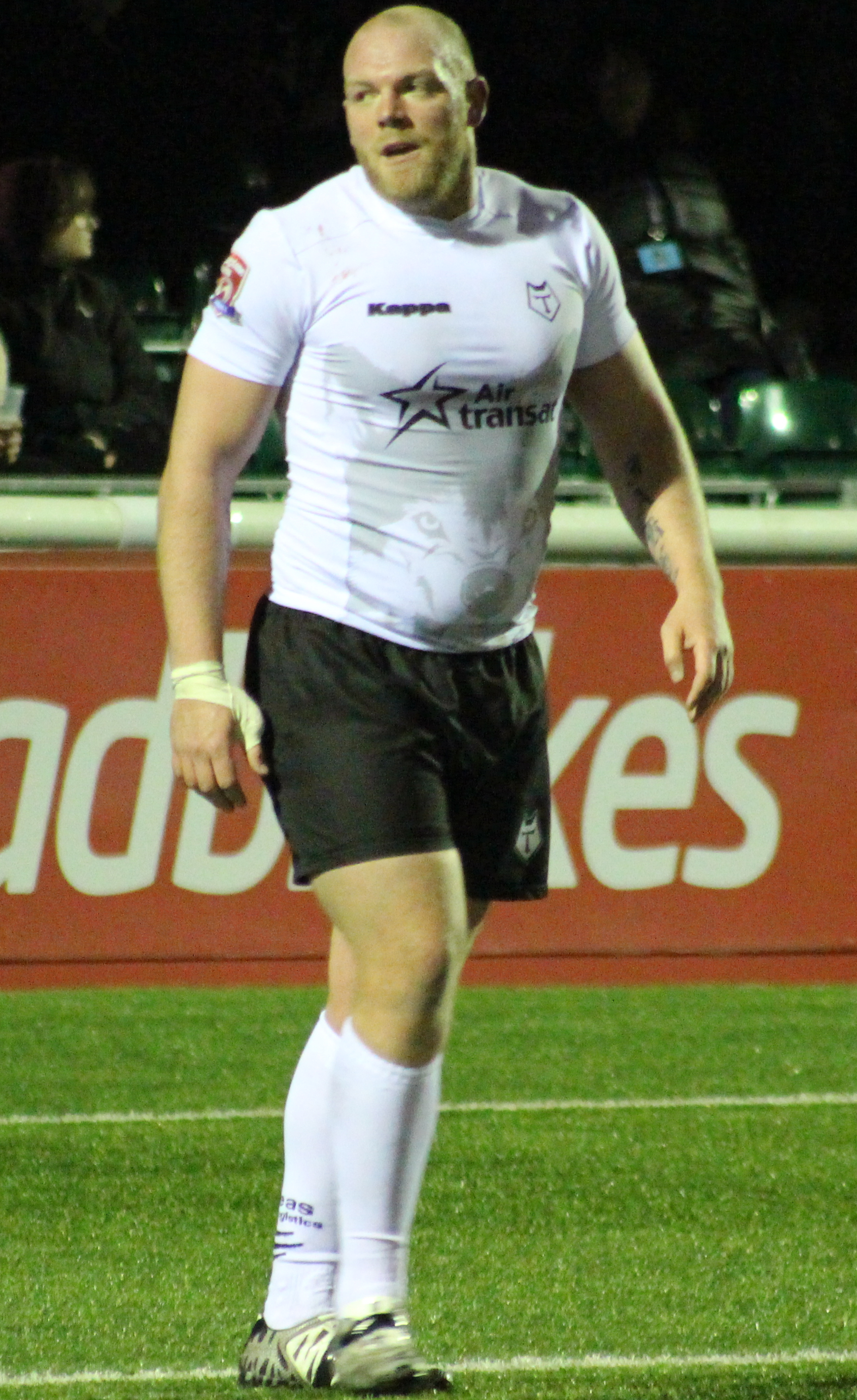

Personal information
- Born: 28 November 1989 (age 36) Bradford, West Yorkshire, England
- Height: 6 ft 2 in (1.87 m)
- Weight: 18 st 13 lb (120 kg)

Playing information
- Position: Prop
Club
Years	Team	Pld	T	G	FG	P
2010–11	Bradford Bulls	9	1	0	0	4
2011–12	Dewsbury Rams	25	4	0	0	16
2013–14	Featherstone Rovers	58	9	0	0	36
2015	Castleford Tigers	6	0	0	0	0
2015–16	Bradford Bulls	39	3	1	0	14
2017	Toronto Wolfpack	20	2	0	0	8
2018–22	Bradford Bulls	108	20	0	0	80
2023	Hunslet R.L.F.C.	18	4	0	0	16
	Total	283	43	1	0	174
- Source: As of 15 May 2024

Steve Crossley (born 28 November 1990) is an English rugby league footballer who last played as a prop for the Hunslet R.L.F.C. in League 1.

He has previously played for Bradford and the Castleford Tigers in the Super League, and the Dewsbury Rams, Featherstone Rovers and the Bulls in the Championship. Crossley has also played for the Toronto Wolfpack in League 1.

== Background ==
Crossley was born in Bradford, West Yorkshire, England. He attended Thornton Grammar School where he was first introduced to rugby league through friends that played locally.

He then began his career playing for the local side Clayton ARLFC, coached by Lee Jones and Andy Hainsworth. After excelling within the team he was picked to represent the Bradford and Keighley Service area, Yorkshire, and Great Britain. He was then signed to his home town academy side the Bradford Bulls, beginning his professional career.

== Playing career ==
Crossley was signed from Clayton RLFC by the Bradford Bulls. He made his Super League début in 2010 against Crusaders Rugby League. During the 2011 season Crossley was released from his contract with Bradford, joining Dewsbury Rams.

Crossley played for Dewsbury in 2012, before joining Featherstone Rovers for the 2013 and 2014 seasons. He impressed for Featherstone and was signed by Castleford Tigers, making his début for the club in the first match of the 2015 Super League season. Crossley made 6 appearances in Super League for Castleford before being released from his contract in April 2015, rejoining the Bradford Bulls on a two-year deal. In November 2016 he signed a one-year deal with Toronto Wolfpack. He returned to the Bradford Bulls on a two-year deal signed in October 2017.

In November 2022, Crossley joined Hunslet R.L.F.C. on a one-year deal and was appointed captain for the 2023 season. He retired at the end of the 2023 season.

== Statistics ==
Statistics do not include pre-season friendlies.

Season	Appearance	Tries	Goals	F/G	Points
2010 Bradford Bulls	7	1	0	0	4
2011 Bradford Bulls	2	0	0	0	0
2015 Bradford Bulls	20	2	0	0	8
2016 Bradford Bulls	19	1	1	0	6
2018 Bradford Bulls	28	6	0	0	24
2019 Bradford Bulls	27	6	0	0	24
2020 Bradford Bulls	6	1	0	0	4
2021 Bradford Bulls	21	4	0	0	16
2022 Bradford Bulls	26	3	0	0	12
Total	156	24	1	0	98
