= Matty Wildie =

English rugby league footballer

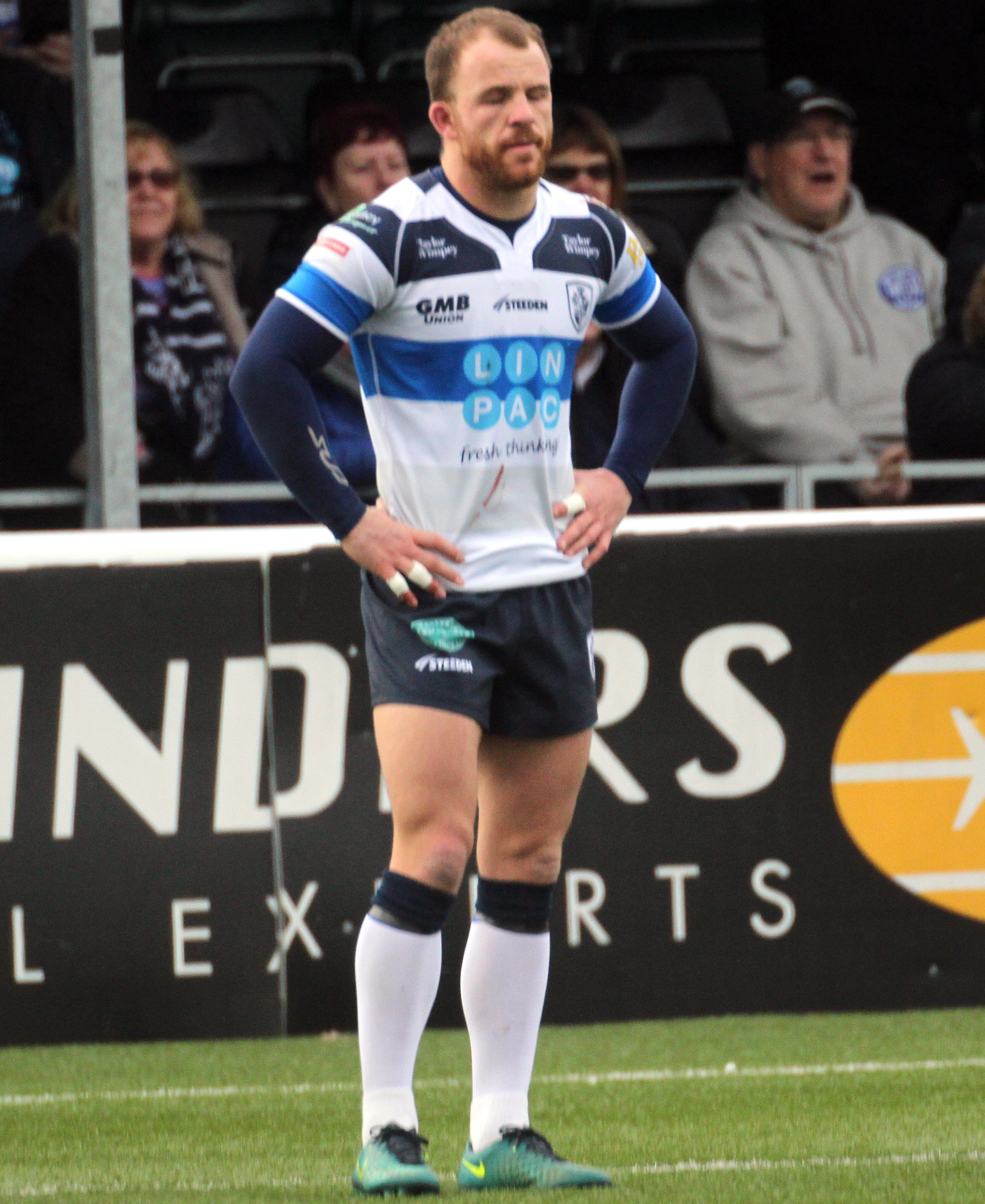

Personal information
- Full name: Matthew Wildie
- Born: 25 October 1990 (age 35) Wakefield, West Yorkshire, England
- Height: 5 ft 9 in (1.75 m)
- Weight: 13 st 1 lb (83 kg)

Playing information
- Position: Hooker, Scrum-half, Stand-off
Club
Years	Team	Pld	T	G	FG	P
2010–14	Wakefield Trinity Wildcats	30	3	0	0	12
2012(loan)	→ Batley Bulldogs	11	4	0	0	16
2014(loan)	→ Doncaster	6	2	0	0	8
2015	Dewsbury Rams	30	4	0	0	16
2016–18	Featherstone Rovers	49	15	0	0	60
2019	Bradford Bulls	28	7	0	0	28
2020–21	Leigh Centurions	13	2	0	0	8
2022–23	Featherstone Rovers	26	6	0	0	24
2024–	Oldham	42	5	0	0	20
	Total	235	48	0	0	192
- Source: As of 4 June 2026

Matty Wildie (born 25 October 1990) is a professional rugby league footballer who plays as a hooker, scrum-half and stand-off for Oldham in the Betfred Championship.

He previously played for the Wakefield Trinity Wildcats in the Super League, and on loan from the Wildcats at the Batley Bulldogs and Doncaster in the Championship. Wildie has also played for the Dewsbury Rams, Featherstone Rovers and the Bradford Bulls in the Championship.

== Background ==
Wildie was born in Wakefield, West Yorkshire, England. He was educated at Outwood Grange Academy.

== Career ==
He previously played for the Wakefield Trinity Wildcats and the Batley Bulldogs (on loan). He signed a two-year contract extension with Wakefield Trinity Wildcats on 26 May 2011. Wildie began a loan spell at the Batley club for an initial one month, to June 2012.

=== Dewsbury Rams ===
In August 2014, he signed with the Dewsbury Rams for the 2015 season.

=== Featherstone Rovers (re-join) ===
On 29 October 2021, it was reported that he had signed for Featherstone in the RFL Championship.

=== Oldham RLFC ===
On 1 Nov 2023 it was reported that he will join Oldham RLFC for 2024
