= Sam Hallas =

English rugby league footballer

Personal information
- Full name: Samuel Hallas
- Born: 18 October 1996 (age 30) Leeds, West Yorkshire, England
- Height: 5 ft 10 in (1.77 m)
- Weight: 15 st 2 lb (96 kg)

Playing information
- Position: Hooker, Loose forward
Club
Years	Team	Pld	T	G	FG	P
2016–17	Leeds Rhinos	4	0	0	0	0
2017(loan)	→ Bradford Bulls	11	0	0	0	0
2017–21	Bradford Bulls	79	13	3	0	58
2022	Newcastle Thunder	7	0	0	0	0
2022	Bradford Bulls	18	2	0	0	8
2023	Hunslet	21	3	0	0	12
2024–26	Bradford Bulls	48	5	0	0	20
2027–	Dewsbury Rams	0	0	0	0	0
	Total	188	23	3	0	98
- Source: As of 20 October 2026
- Relatives: Graeme Hallas (uncle)

Sam Hallas (born 18 October 1996) is an English professional rugby league footballer who plays as a hooker or loose forward for the Dewsbury Rams in the RFL Championship.

== Background ==
Hallas was born in Leeds, West Yorkshire, England.

== Playing career ==
=== Leeds Rhinos ===
Hallas signed for the Leeds Rhinos Under 15s from amateur club Stanningley ARLFC and went on to captain Leeds' under 19s. He made his first team début for Leeds in 2016 at the Magic Weekend vs Wigan Warriors, playing as a hooker after previously playing at prop in the academy.

Hallas made four appearances for Leeds before joining Bradford Bulls on an initial month loan deal in February 2017 which was extended to the end of the season.

=== Bradford Bulls ===
Near the end of the 2017 season, Hallas made his move to the Bulls permanent by signing a two-year deal. He signed an extension at the end of the 2019 season.

=== Newcastle Thunder ===
On 9 November 2021, it was reported that he had signed for Newcastle Thunder in the RFL Championship.

=== Bradford Bulls (re-join) ===
On 4 October 2023, it was reported that he had re-signed for Bradford in the RFL Championship.

=== Dewsbury Rams ===
On 30 September 2026 it was reported that he had signed for Dewsbury Rams in the RFL Championship on a 2-year deal.

== International career ==
Hallas played for England Academy at youth level where he was made captain.

== Personal life ==
Hallas is the son of the late former Hunslet rugby league player Steven Hallas, and nephew of Graeme Hallas, who played for clubs such as Hull Kingston Rovers and Halifax RLFC.
