= John Kear =

English rugby league coach (1954–2026)

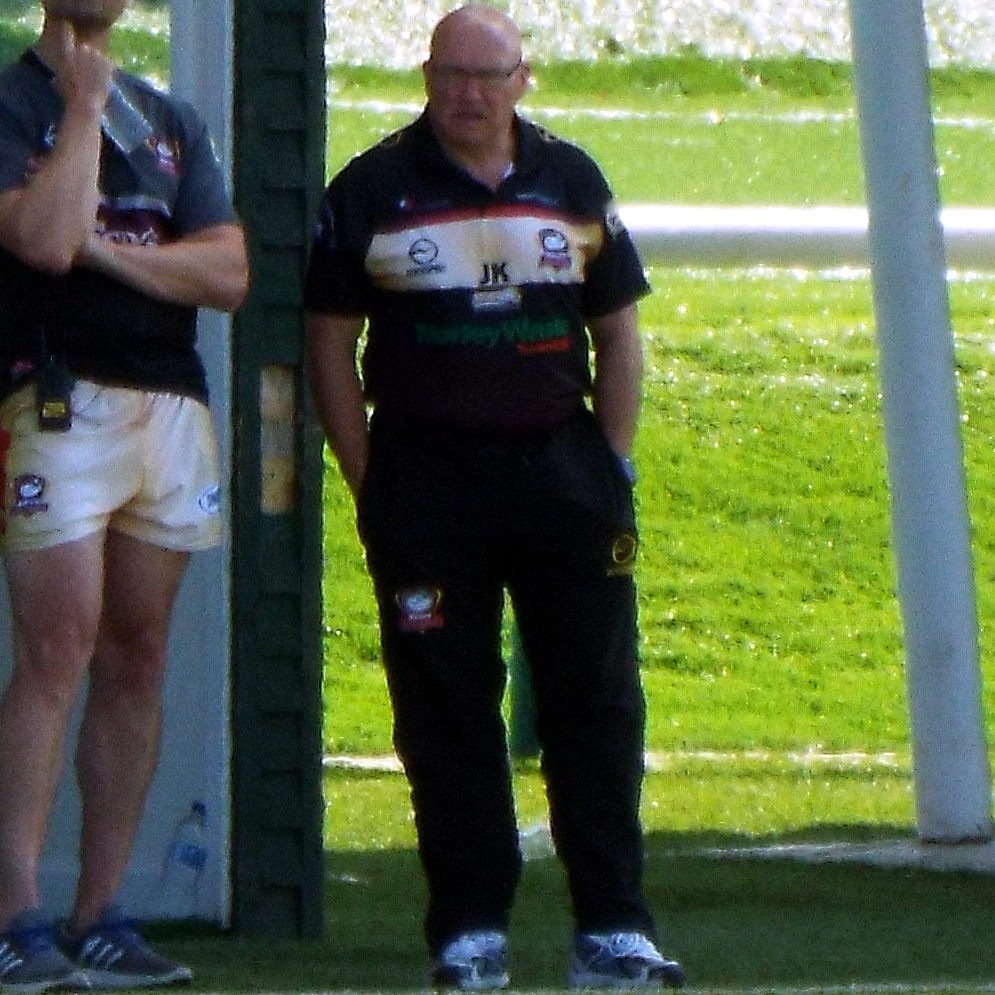

Personal information
- Born: 25 November 1954 Castleford, West Riding of Yorkshire, England
- Died: 31 May 2026 (aged 71)

Playing information
- Position: Wing, centre, fullback
Club
| Years | Team | Pld | T | G | FG | P |
|---|---|---|---|---|---|---|
| 1978–88 | Castleford | 133 | 37 | 0 | 0 | 132 |

Coaching information
Club
| Years | Team | Gms | W | D | L | W% |
| 1992 | Bramley RLFC |
| 1995–96 | PSG | 44 | 9 | 1 | 34 | 20 |
| 1997–99 | Sheffield Eagles | 65 | 24 | 3 | 38 | 37 |
| 2000 | Huddersfield-Sheffield | 28 | 4 | 0 | 24 | 14 |
| 2005–06 | Hull | 43 | 24 | 2 | 17 | 56 |
| 2006–11 | Wakefield Trinity Wildcats | 153 | 64 | 1 | 88 | 42 |
| 2011–16 | Batley Bulldogs |
| 2018–22 | Bradford Bulls | 102 | 66 | 1 | 35 | 65 |
| 2022–23 | Widnes Vikings | 28 | 13 | 0 | 15 | 46 |
| 2025 | Batley Bulldogs | 11 | 2 | 0 | 9 | 18 |
| | Total | 474 | 206 | 8 | 260 | 43 |
Representative
| Years | Team | Gms | W | D | L | W% |
| 1997 | France | 1 | 1 | 0 | 0 | 100 |
| 2000 | England | 6 | 4 | 0 | 2 | 67 |
| 2014–25 | Wales | 15 | 7 | 1 | 7 | 47 |

John Kear (25 November 1954 – 31 May 2026) was an English professional rugby league footballer and coach. He also worked as a pundit for BBC Sport.

Kear was perhaps best known as a coach for his Challenge Cup successes with Sheffield Eagles in 1998 and Hull in 2005, as well as his time coaching Wakefield Trinity in the late 2000s. As a player, he played on the wing or in the centre position for Castleford.

== Background ==
Kear was born in Castleford, West Riding of Yorkshire, England on 25 November 1954.

== Playing career ==
=== County Cup Final appearances ===
Kear played on the wing in Castleford's 13–2 defeat by Hull in the 1983 Yorkshire Cup Final during the 1983–84 season at Elland Road, Leeds on Saturday 15 October 1983.

== Coaching career ==
=== Early career ===
After stints working as a conditioner for Castleford, as head coach of Bramley (1992), working in the player performance department of the Rugby Football League, head coach of Paris Saint-Germain, and assistant coach to both England and Great Britain, he took over the coaching reins at Sheffield Eagles in 1997, taking them to the Premiership semi-final in that year. A year later he was the coach who led Sheffield Eagles to a Challenge Cup final victory over the Wigan Warriors; this triumph has been described as one of the greatest shocks in Challenge Cup history.

Sheffield Eagles merged with the Huddersfield Giants after 1999's Super League IV, and Kear retained his job as coach of the merged side before moving on to become the assistant coach to Stuart Raper at the Wigan Warriors.

Kear was coach of the England team in the 2000 World Cup, leading them to the semi-finals.

=== Later career ===
Kear left Wigan for the first team coach role at Hull F.C., working with Shaun McRae. He stepped up to first team coach at Hull in 2005 when predecessor McRae left to take charge of South Sydney Rabbitohs. He led the club to victory over Leeds, by a 25–24 scoreline in the 2005 Challenge Cup in his first season. However, in April 2006 he was sacked by Hull.

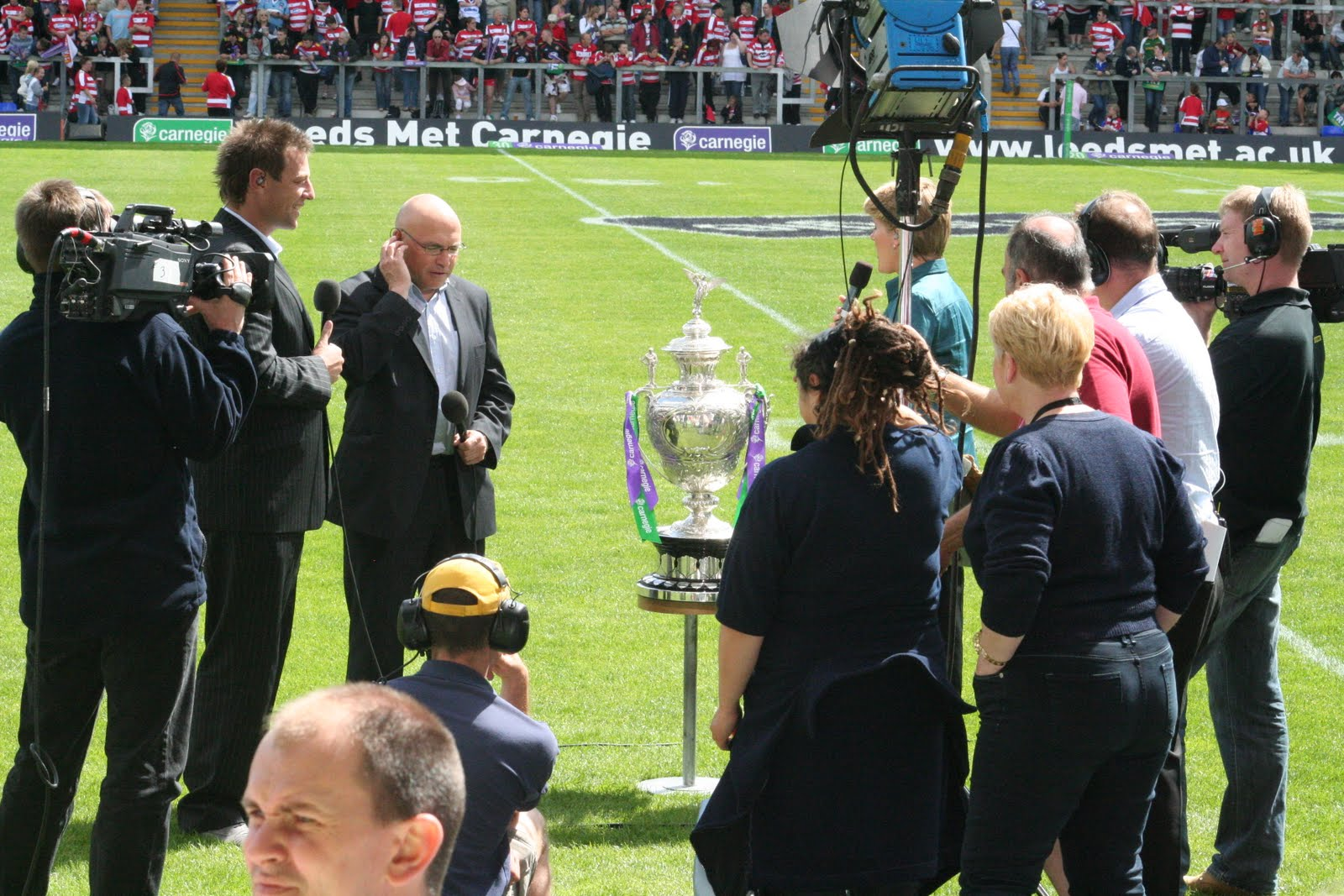
Kear in 2007

He took charge of Wakefield Trinity in July 2006 where he steered the team clear of relegation with four wins from the last six matches of the season, culminating in the great escape and condemning Castleford to relegation to National League One.

In 2007, he fielded a predominantly untried squad and led Trinity to eighth position in the Super League, their second-highest Super League finish.

In 2009, Kear led Wakefield Trinity to 5th position, their highest ever Super League finish. The team were knocked out of the first round of the play-offs by Catalans Dragons.

In 2011 Kear left Wakefield Trinity to become head coach of Batley.

=== Bradford Bulls ===
Following the 2017 World Cup, Kear signed a three-year deal to coach RFL League 1 side Bradford Bulls following their relegation from the RFL Championship. During his first season he missed out on automatic promotion as York City Knights finished top of the table, however he guided the Bulls to a 27–8 victory against Workington Town in the 2018 League 1 playoff final, ensuring promotion to the Championship for the 2019 season.

During the 2019 pre-season Kear coached the side to win the revived Yorkshire Cup beating Halifax R.L.F.C. (26-16) and Dewsbury Rams (20-18) to progress to the final where the Bulls beat Batley Bulldogs (14-12) in front of a crowd of 2,278. John Kear's reputation as a 'giant killer' in the Challenge Cup was once again shown as the Bulls defeated arch rivals and Super League side Leeds Rhinos 24–22 in front of a 10,258 home crowd, however the Bulls were knocked out in the quarter-finals by Halifax. Despite the Challenge Cup run, in the league Kear could only manage to get the Bulls to sixth place in the table, narrowly missing out on the playoffs.

At the start of the 2020 season, Kear nearly pulled off another Challenge Cup upset against Super League opposition Wakefield Trinity, however the Bulls just narrowly lost the match 14–17. The 2020 season was suspended indefinitely after four league games due to the COVID-19 pandemic in the United Kingdom. Following this, Kear signed a 2-year extension to his contract, keeping him at the Bulls until the end of the 2022 season. Kear left Bradford in April 2022 by mutual consent.

=== Batley Bulldogs ===
On 26 June 2025, it was reported that he had taken the role of head-coach for Batley Bulldogs in the RFL Championship.

On 26 September 2025, it was reported that he had retired from coaching and handed over the head coach role to James Ford.

=== Wales ===
On 16 July 2014, Kear succeeded Iestyn Harris as head coach of Wales, a role he undertook alongside his position at Batley and subsequently at Bradford Bulls. His first game was against Scotland in the 2014 European Cup. Wales lost the opening game by a score of 42–18. After the 2014 European Cup event, his Welsh team took on Scotland again in the opening match of the 2015 Tournament. John's team earned their first ever victory after a spree of 12 consecutive defeats which began back in 2011. Wales went on to be unbeaten in the tournament resulting in them winning their first European Cup tournament since 2010. The following year, he was required to make Wales qualify for the 2017 Rugby League World Cup via the European qualifiers. In the opening game at Llanelli, Wales beat Serbia by 50 points.

Kear coached the Wales 9s squad at the 2019 Rugby League World Cup 9s. Kear coached Wales at the 2021 Rugby League World Cup where they lost all three group stage matches.

He left the Wales head coach job in July 2025.

== Death ==
Kear died suddenly on 31 May 2026, at the age of 71. A day prior to his death, he was part of the BBC commentary team for the 2026 Challenge Cup final.

== Managerial statistics ==
Managerial record by team and tenure
| Team | From | To | Record | | | | |
| Team | From | To | P | W | D | L | Win % |
|---|---|---|---|---|---|---|---|
| Bradford Bulls | 11 December 2017 | 25 April 2022 | 102 | 66 | 1 | 35 | 64.71 |
| Widnes Vikings | 1 July 2022 | present | 0 | 0 | 0 | 0 | — |
| Total | | | 102 | 66 | 1 | 35 | 64.71 |
