= Ethan Ryan =

Ireland international rugby league footballer

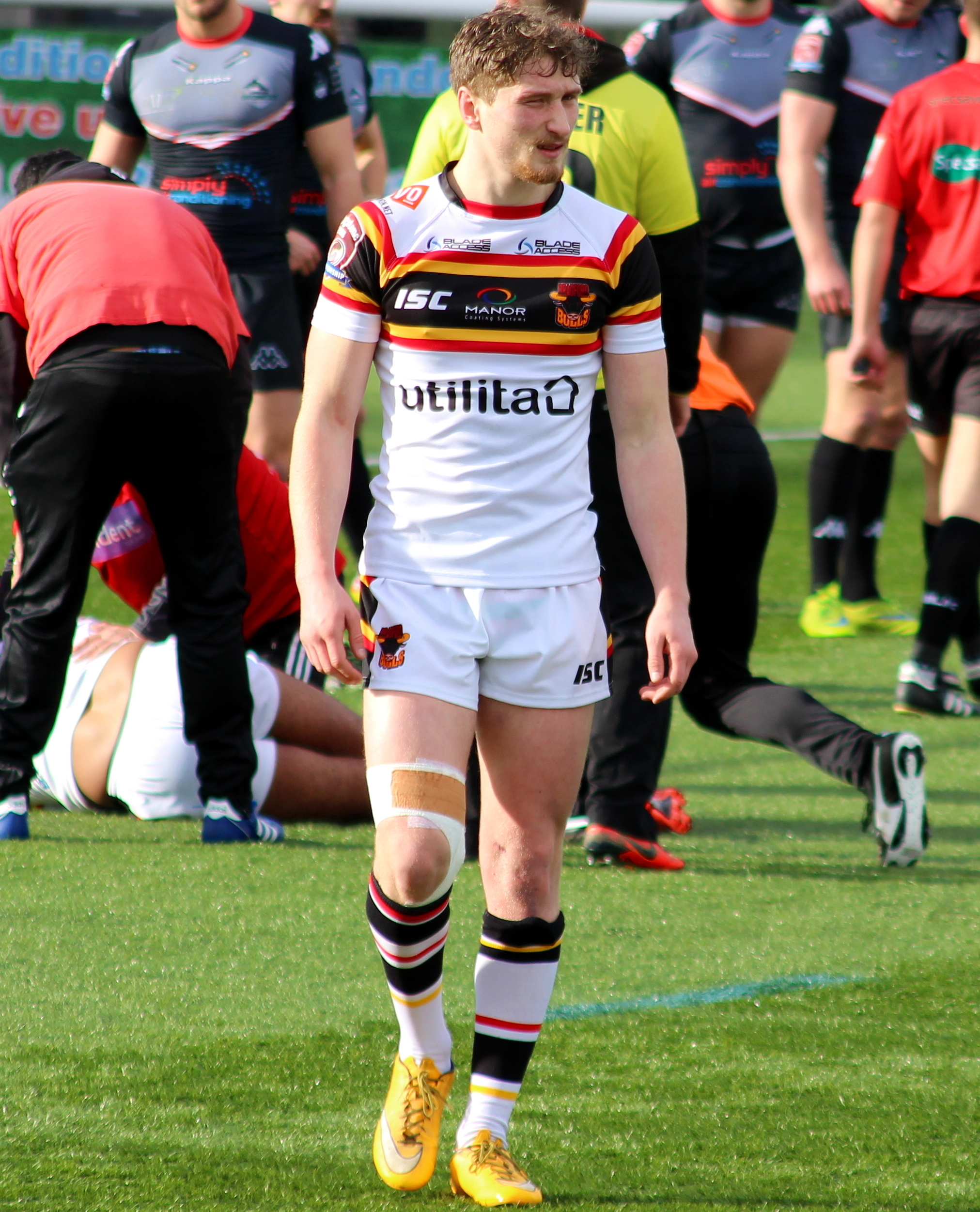

Personal information
- Born: 12 May 1996 (age 29) Halifax, West Yorkshire, England
- Height: 6 ft 0 in (1.82 m)
- Weight: 13 st 8 lb (86 kg)

Playing information
- Position: Wing, Fullback, Centre
Club
Years	Team	Pld	T	G	FG	P
2016–19	Bradford Bulls	98	89	1	0	358
2020–23	Hull Kingston Rovers	42	22	0	0	88
2024–25	Salford Red Devils	31	9	0	0	36
2025	Oldham	4	2	0	0	8
2026–	Bradford Bulls	4	5	0	0	20
	Total	179	127	1	0	510
Representative
Years	Team	Pld	T	G	FG	P
2018–	Ireland	5	2	0	0	8
- Source: As of 20 October 2025

Ethan Ryan (born 12 May 1996) is an Ireland international rugby league footballer who plays as a wing, centre or fullback for the Bradford Bulls in the Super League.

He previously played for Oldham RLFC in the Championship and League 1.

== Background ==
Ryan was born in Halifax, West Yorkshire, England.

He is a product of the Bradford Bulls Academy system and signed his first professional contract in October 2015. Ryan previously played for local amateur sides Queensbury and West Bowling ARLFC and was also part of Keighley scholarship.

== Bradford Bulls ==
In the 2016 season, Ryan featured in the pre-season friendlies against the Leeds Rhinos and the Castleford Tigers. Ryan featured in Round 5 (Oldham). He played in Round 7 against the London Broncos then in Round 10 (Dewsbury Rams). Ryan played in Round 17 Workington Town then in Round 19 Halifax. He played in Round 21 Whitehaven to Round 23 Featherstone Rovers. Ryan featured in the Championship Shield in Game 3 Oldham to the Semi Final Dewsbury. Midway through the season Ryan extended his contract by two years.

In the 2017 season, Ryan featured in the pre-season friendly against the Keighley Cougars. Ryan featured in Round 1 against Hull Kingston Rovers to Round 16 against Dewsbury then in Round 19 Oldham to Round 21 against Hull Kingston Rovers. He played in the Championship Shield Game 5 Sheffield Eagles to Game 7 Rochdale Hornets. Ryan also played in the 2017 Challenge Cup in Round 4 against Featherstone Rovers. At the end of the season, Ryan signed with Leigh however following Leigh Centurions' relegation from Super League he signed a two-year extension to stay with the Bradford club.

In the 2018 season, Ryan featured in the pre-season friendlies against the Sheffield Eagles, Dewsbury, Toronto Wolfpack and the Keighley Cougars. Ryan featured in Round 1 against York to Round 25 Oldham R.L.F.C. then in the Semi Final against Oldham to the Final Workington Town. Ryan also played in the 2018 Challenge Cup in Round 3 West Wales Raiders to Round 5 against Warrington.

In the 2019 season, Ryan featured in the pre-season friendlies against Halifax R.L.F.C., Dewsbury, Batley and the Toronto Wolfpack. Ryan featured in Round 1 Featherstone Rovers to Round 27 against Rochdale. Ryan also played in the 2019 Challenge Cup in Round 4 the Keighley Cougars to Quarter Final Halifax R.L.F.C. At the end of the 2019 season, Ryan signed a two-year deal with Super League side Hull Kingston Rovers.

=== Hull Kingston Rovers ===
On 12 August 2023, Ryan played for Hull Kingston Rovers in their 17-16 golden point extra-time loss to Leigh in the Challenge Cup final. Ryan played nine games for Hull Kingston Rovers in the 2023 Super League season as the club finished fourth on the table and qualified for the playoffs.

=== Salford Red Devils ===
On 11 May 2023 it was reported that he had signed for Salford Red Devils for 2024.

=== Oldham RLFC ===
On 22 August 2025 it was reported that he had signed for Oldham RLFC in the RFL Championship

=== Bradford Bulls (re-join) ===
On 20 October 2025 it was reported that he had re-joined Bradford Bulls in the Super League

== Statistics ==
Statistics do not include pre-season friendlies.

Season	Team	Appearance	Tries	Goals	F/G	Points
2016	Bradford Bulls	14	16	0	0	64
2017	Bradford Bulls	23	17	0	0	68
2018	Bradford Bulls	30	36	0	0	144
2019	Bradford Bulls	31	20	1	0	82
	Sub-total:	98	89	1	0	358
2020	Hull Kingston Rovers	6	3	0	0	12
2021	Hull Kingston Rovers	5	2	0	0	8
2022	Hull Kingston Rovers	20	10	0	0	40
2023	Hull Kingston Rovers	12	7	0	0	28
	Sub-total:	43	23	0	0	92
2024	Salford Red Devils	0	0	0	0	0
	Sub-total:	0	0	0	0	0
	Total:	141	112	1	0	450
