= 2019 Yorkshire Cup =

Rugby league competition in England

- Structure: Pre season regional knockout championship
- Teams: 8

The 2019 Yorkshire Cup competition was a pre season knock-out competition between (mainly professional) rugby league clubs from the county of Yorkshire.

== Background ==
The original Yorkshire Cup was scrapped in 1993 due to fixture congestion after being played every year since 1905. In late 2018, a group of lower league Yorkshire based clubs resurrected the Yorkshire Cup as a pre-season tournament to add more interest and intensity to pre-season. The eight founding clubs of the 'new' Yorkshire Cup were; Batley, Bradford, Dewsbury, Featherstone, Halifax, Hunslet, York and amateur club Hunslet Club Parkside.

== Fixtures ==
=== Round 1 ===
Winner	Score	Runner up	Match Information			Reports
Winner	Score	Runner up	Date and Time	Venue	Attendance	Reports
York City Knights	34–4	Hunslet Club Parkside	5 January 2019, 1 pm	Crown Flatt	1,504
Dewsbury Rams	20–14	Featherstone Rovers	5 January 2019, 3:30 pm	Crown Flatt	1,504
Batley Bulldogs	36–0	Hunslet	6 January 2019, 1 pm	Odsal Stadium	3,341
Bradford Bulls	26–16	Halifax	6 January 2019, 3 pm	Odsal Stadium	3,341

=== Semi finals ===
Winner	Score	Runner up	Match Information			Reports
Winner	Score	Runner up	Date and Time	Venue	Attendance	Reports
Bradford Bulls	20–18	Dewsbury Rams	12 January 2019, 5:30 pm	Odsal Stadium	1,235
Batley Bulldogs	22–18	York City Knights	13 January 2019, 2 pm	Mount Pleasant	786

=== Final ===
Winner	Score	Runner up	Match Information			Reports
Winner	Score	Runner up	Date and Time	Venue	Attendance	Reports
Bradford Bulls	14–12	Batley Bulldogs	20 January 2019	Mount Pleasant	2,278
