= Elliot Minchella =

England international rugby league footballer

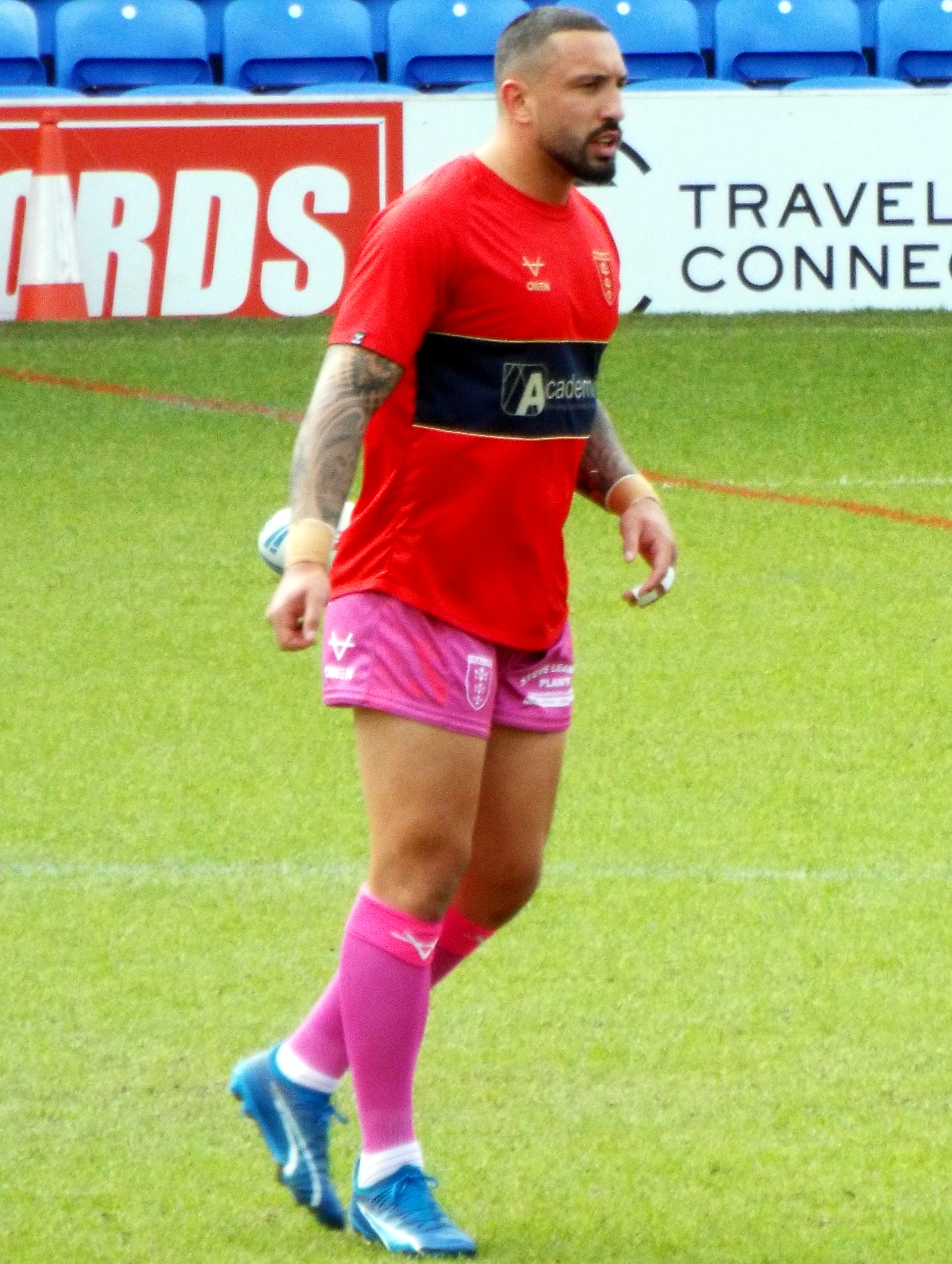

Personal information
- Full name: Elliot Frazier Minchella
- Born: 28 January 1996 (age 30) Bradford, West Yorkshire, England
- Height: 5 ft 10 in (1.78 m)
- Weight: 14 st 7 lb (92 kg)

Playing information
- Position: Second-row, Loose forward, Hooker
Club
| Years | Team | Pld | T | G | FG | P |
|---|---|---|---|---|---|---|
| 2013–15 | Leeds Rhinos | 6 | 1 | 0 | 0 | 4 |
| 2015(loan) | → London Broncos | 18 | 4 | 0 | 1 | 17 |
| 2016–17 | Sheffield Eagles | 56 | 21 | 0 | 0 | 84 |
| 2018–19 | Bradford Bulls | 59 | 45 | 37 | 0 | 254 |
| 2020– | Hull Kingston Rovers | 164 | 25 | 0 | 0 | 100 |
| 2022(DR) | → Dewsbury Rams | 1 | 0 | 0 | 0 | 0 |
| | Total | 304 | 96 | 37 | 1 | 459 |
Representative
| Years | Team | Pld | T | G | FG | P |
| 2024 | England | 1 | 0 | 0 | 0 | 0 |
- Source: As of 19 September 2026

Elliot Minchella (born 28 January 1996) is an English professional rugby league footballer who plays as a second-row or loose forward for Hull Kingston Rovers in the Super League.

He previously played for the Leeds Rhinos in the Super League, and on loan from Leeds at the London Broncos in the Championship. Minchella has also played for the Sheffield Eagles in the second tier, and the Bradford Bulls in League 1 and the Championship.

On the 7th June 2025 he became only the second Hull KR captain to lift the Challenge Cup after the late Roger Millward in 1980, as his side defeated Warrington 8-6 at Wembley Stadium.

On 18th September 2025, he captained Hull KR to their second major trophy of the 2025 season as The Robins won the Super League League Leaders Shield for the first time in their history.

On the 11th October 2025, he was instrumental in winning their 3rd major trophy of the year, beating Wigan in the Grand Final. Resulting in a treble winning season, and their first ever grand final win.

== Background ==
Minchella was born in Bradford, West Yorkshire, England.

== Playing career ==
=== Leeds Rhinos ===
Minchella made his Super League début for Leeds Rhinos in 2013, scoring a try in a victory over Salford in his only appearance on the year.

He made a further five appearances in 2014 before an off-field incident involving him and club mate Zak Hardaker being involved in an assault put him out of favour at Leeds.

=== London Broncos (loan) ===
In 2015 Minchella was loaned to Championship club London Broncos for whole of the season. He played in 18 games in total and scored four tries and kicked a drop goal.

=== Sheffield Eagles ===
He then signed for the Sheffield Eagles and in two seasons played 56 times and scored 21 tries for the club.

=== Bradford Bulls ===
Minchella signed for home town side the Bradford Bulls on a 2-year deal on 21 September 2017.

=== Hull KR ===
At the end of the 2018 season, Minchella signed a three-year full time deal with Bradford, but in 2019 he was one of five players Bradford sold to Hull Kingston Rovers. In his two seasons at Bradford he made 59 appearances scoring 45 tries and becoming a regular goalkicker scoring 37 goals.

The curtailed 2020 season saw him limited to just 16 appearances for Hull KR and in the second game of the 2021 season he suffered an anterior cruciate ligament injury which ruled him out for the rest of the season.

On 12 August 2023, Minchella played for Hull Kingston Rovers in their 17-16 golden point extra-time loss to Leigh in the Challenge Cup final.

Minchella played 23 matches for Hull Kingston Rovers in the 2023 Super League season as the club finished fourth on the table and qualified for the playoffs. He played in the club's semi-final loss against Wigan.

On 12 October 2024, Minchella played in Hull Kingston Rovers 2024 Super League Grand Final loss against Wigan.

On 7 June 2025 he became the first captain of Hull KR since Roger Millward in 1980 to lift the Challenge Cup following their 8-6 win over Warrington Wolves.

On 7 June 2025 he became only the second Hull KR captain to lift the Challenge Cup after the late Roger Millward in 1980, as his side defeated Warrington 8-6 at Wembley Stadium. On 18 September 2025, he captained Hull KR to their second major trophy of the 2025 season as they won the Super League League Leaders Shield for the first time in their history. On 9 October 2025, Minchella played in Hull Kingston Rovers 2025 Super League Grand Final victory over Wigan.

On 19 February 2026, Minchella played in Hull Kingston Rovers World Club Challenge victory against Brisbane.

=== International ===
He made his England début on 29 June 2024 v France in Toulouse.
