= 2018 Bradford Bulls season =

- League 1 Rank: 2nd
- Play-off result: Winners - Promoted
- Challenge Cup: 5th Round
- 2018 record: Wins: 27; draws: 0; losses: 4
- Points scored: For: 1393; against: 360

Team information
- Chairman: Andrew Chalmers
- Head Coach: John Kear
- Captain: Lee Smith
- Stadium: Odsal Stadium
- High attendance: 6,441 vs York City Knights

Top scorers
- Tries: Ethan Ryan (36)
- Goals: Dane Chisholm (121)
- Points: Dane Chisholm (312)
← 2017	List of seasons	2019 →

This article details the Bradford Bulls rugby league football club's 2018 season. This is the Bulls 1st season in League 1. Following liquidation, the Bulls finished last place in the 2017 RFL Championship season and were relegated alongside Oldham.

== Season review ==
=== August 2017 ===
By the start of August it was confirmed that the Bulls would be relegated into League 1 after finishing bottom of the 2017 RFL Championship table. Preparation for the 2018 season began in August when it was announced that academy graduate and first team player Keenan Tomlinson agreed to leave the Bulls by mutual consent. This was swiftly followed by the news that home grown second-rower and the 2017 Player of the Year James Bentley, had signed a 3-year deal with Super League side St. Helens.

=== September 2017 ===
Home grown centre Ross Oakes and prop forward Liam Kirk both re-signed with Bradford among speculation that the duo would leave due to the Bulls relegation, however both signed new 2-year deals. It was announced that centre James Mendieka had been released by the club after three seasons. Young academy graduate hooker Joe Lumb signed a 1-year deal with local League 1 side Keighley Cougars after not featuring much during 2017. Further departures were announced as winger Johnny Campbell resigned with his old club Batley Bulldogs. While fellow winger Omari Caro announced on social media that he had retired from the sport. Second row forward Colton Roche joined the mini exodus as he signed for Huddersfield Giants of the Super League. Some good news followed the exodus as it was revealed that highly rated academy prospects Reiss Butterworth, Evan Hodgson and Oliver Wilson all signed new 3-year contracts with the Bulls. Hodgson and Butterworth have both featured in the first team during the 2017 season, however Wilson is yet to make his debut. In a shock move, Bradford managed to acquire the services of current superstar halfback Dane Chisholm for another 2 season despite interest from several other clubs. Meanwhile, prop forward Ross Peltier put pen to paper on a new 2-year deal and young halfback Joe Keyes also signed up for another 2 years. Hooker Vila Halafihi became the 9th player to re-sign with the Bulls after agreeing a new 2-year deal to stay at Odsal. Following this, hooker Scott Moore was released after declining to sign a new contract. Lifelong Bulls fan and loose forward Elliot Minchella became the first new signing of the 2018 season as he signed a 2-year part-time deal from RFL Championship side Sheffield Eagles. The month ended on a high for the Bulls as they announced the capture of experienced second rower Matt Garside from Championship team London Broncos on a 2-year deal.

=== October 2017 ===
October started with the re-signing of two young academy products, winger Josh Rickett and fullback Brandon Pickersgill both signed 2 year part-time deals after making a handful of appearances last season. After initially signing for Leigh Centurions, young winger Ethan Ryan re-signed with Bradford on a 2-year deal following Leigh's relegation to the Championship. Prop forward James Davies signed a 1-year extension to his contract to stay at Bradford, whilst it was announced that young prop Mikey Wood signed on a 1-year loan deal from Super League side Huddersfield Giants. Young prop George Milton signed a 2-year deal with Bradford from newly promoted side Hull Kingston Rovers. It was announced that former prop and academy graduate Steve Crossley would return to the club for a third spell from Canadian side Toronto Wolfpack on a 2-year deal.

=== November 2017 ===
Off-contract winger Iliess Macani departed the Bulls and signed for RFL Championship side Sheffield Eagles on a 1-year deal. It was announced that the Bulls would play local rivals Halifax in a festive Boxing Day friendly, the first the Bulls have participated in since 2012. Following this it was also confirmed that the Bulls would play Sheffield Eagles in a friendly as a part of the Dane Chisholm transfer midway through last season. Young second-row forward Liam Johnson followed the footsteps of Mikey Wood and joined the Bulls from Super League side Huddersfield Giants on a season long loan. The fixtures for the 2018 season were announced and the Bulls would kick off the campaign away to York City Knights on 18 February, before hosting the London Skolars at home on 4 March. The highly anticipated derby with local rivals Keighley Cougars were scheduled on 11 March (away) and 2 September (home). It was also revealed that head coach Geoff Toovey would not be returning to the Bulls and in the meantime Leigh Beattie will take up the interim head coach role until a new coach is appointed. Championship side Dewsbury Rams released details to two friendlies, with one being against the Bulls on 21 January at Crown Flatt, meanwhile Bradford announced that they would face Keighley Cougars in a friendly match on 11 February for the Joe Philips Memorial trophy. Sheffield Eagles announced that they would face Bradford in a friendly in 2018 as part of the deal which brought superstar halfback Dane Chisholm to the Bulls in 2017, the tie will be played on 11 January. The newest team in rugby league, Toronto Wolfpack also announced a ground breaking Transatlantic Challenge which would see them face the Bulls in a pre-season match in 2018 and 2019, with the 2018 fixture being played at Odsal on 26 January and the 2019 fixture likely to be played in Canada or the United States to promote the sport. Prop forward Jon Magrin who featured for the Bulls 25 times in 2017 decided to sign with Championship side Sheffield Eagles on a 2-year deal joining fellow former teammate Iliess Macani.

=== December 2017 ===
December started off with the news that the Bulls had signed young utility forward Jamel Goodall on a one-year contract from Castleford Tigers after impressing beforehand with Keighley Cougars. It was also announced that following the departure of Geoff Toovey, former Sheffield Eagles, Hull F.C. and England coach John Kear had signed a 3-year deal to become head coach. His first move was to appoint long term clubman and interim coach Leigh Beattie as his assistant coach whilst making experienced back Lee Smith the club captain. Bradford also secured the services of young centre/second row Callum Bustin on a season long loan deal from Castleford Tigers, he has had previous loan spells at fellow League 1 clubs Newcastle Thunder and London Skolars. The Bulls released their new 2018 home shirt which pays tribute to the 40th anniversary of Bradford Northern's Premiership victory in 1978, featuring a red, amber and black chevron on a white background. During this reveal the 2018 squad numbers were also released with club captain Lee Smith retaining the number 1 shirt, other major movers include centre Ashley Gibson at number 3, Sam Hallas at number 9, Steve Crossley at number 10 whilst newcomers Matt Garside, Elliot Minchella and George Milton will wear the number 11, 12 and 13 shirts. With the appointment of the shirt numbers it means that Australian prop Damien Sironen has not signed a new deal, veteran centre Willie Tonga and fullback Oscar Thomas were released. Another new signing was unveiled in the form of experienced Championship winger Dalton Grant on a 1-year deal from London Broncos, Grant missed the 2017 season due to injury but is looking to earn a starting spot for the Bulls. 30 year old former Super League winger Alex Brown signed a 1-year deal with the Bulls from local side Batley Bulldogs becoming the 10th new recruit for the season. The Boxing Day friendly ended with a 22-6 victory for the Bulls with newcomer Elliot Minchella scoring two tries and fellow newcomer Dalton Grant also crossing for a try whilst youngster Liam Kirk also scored. Club captain Lee Smith kicked two goals and academy player Rowan Milnes also kicked a goal.

=== January 2018 ===
Top points scorer from last season Oscar Thomas followed former Bulls Iliess Macani and Jon Magrin by signing with RFL Championship side Sheffield Eagles on a one-year deal. The next friendly for the Bulls saw them overcome RFL Championship side Sheffield Eagles 12-6 in a very defensive match which saw Steve Crossley and Dalton Grant claim tried for Bradford whilst youngster Rowan Milnes kicked two goals. The following game saw the Bulls field a young side away at Dewsbury Rams for former player Paul Sykess' testimonial. The Bulls lost the match 24-0. During a press conference it was revealed that the Bulls had entered a dual registration with Championship side Toronto Wolfpack. Also in this press conference the Bulls announced the signing of fullback Gregg McNally on a two-year deal from Leigh Centurions and also revealed the new red 2018 away kit. The Bulls faced their new dual registration partners in a friendly, however the Toronto side outclassed the Bradford side who lost the match 34-0.

=== February 2018 ===
Recently signed prop forward Jamel Goodall put pen to paper on a contract extension, after impressing coach John Kear in the pre-season games, keeping Goodall at the Bulls until after the 2019 season. The Bulls finished their pre-season friendlies with a hard-fought 28-20 win over local rivals Keighley Cougars. Loan signing Liam Johnson scored a brace whilst Alex Brown, Elliot Minchella and Brandon Pickersgill also scored with Joe Keyes kicking 4 goals. The league season started with a narrow 22-20 victory over promotion rivals York City Knights, prop forward Steve Crossley, centre Ashley Gibson and Minchella all crossed for a try and Keyes held his nerve in the final minute to kick a penalty goal to provide the win for the Bulls and bring his personal tally to 5 goals for the game. The Bulls announced the signing of Bradford born hooker George Flanagan from Hunslet R.L.F.C. on a two-year deal. Bradford progressed in the 2018 Challenge Cup with a comprehensive 82-6 win over West Wales Raiders, second rower Minchella scored five tries in the rout with Gibson, Johnson and Gregg McNally scoring two tries each. Callum Bustin, Dane Chisholm, Crossley and Ethan Ryan also crossed the try line and Joe Keyes rounded off the scoring with 11 goals.

=== March 2018 ===
March started with the news that trialist Harvey Burnett had been signed on a permanent deal following an impressive pre-season. The scheduled league match against London Skolars was postponed due to bad weather. In their next league match the Bulls came out 54-6 winners over local rivals Keighley Cougars. New signing George Flanagan and Elliot Minchella both scored a brace of tries whilst Dalton Grant, Sam Hallas, Joe Keyes, Ross Peltier and Ethan Ryan also scored tries, Keyes kicked 9 conversions. Trialist Dan King was allocated the number 16 shirt whilst winger Alex Brown retired from the sport to pursue a full-time job. Trialist Jordan Andrade was also signed on a permanent deal whilst Toronto Wolfpack centre Jake Butler-Fleming joined the Bulls on a one-month loan deal. Prop forward James Davies joined local rivals Keighley Cougars on a one-month loan deal. Following the win against Keighley the Bulls secured a 32-12 victory over Hunslet R.L.F.C. with Dalton Grant scoring a hat-trick, Sam Hallas scoring two tries and halfback Dane Chisholm rounding off the scoring with Keyes making 4 conversions. The Bulls rounded off March with a 30-12 win over fellow promotion contenders Oldham R.L.F.C., Grant continued his scoring run with a brace of tries whilst Chisholm and Minchella also crossed the line with conversions from Keyes, Lee Smith and Chisholm.

=== April 2018 ===
The month started with a 34-10 win away at Hunslet R.L.F.C. in the re-arranged 2018 Challenge Cup tie. Matt Garside scored for the first time in a Bulls shirt whilst Liam Johnson, Josh Rickett and Ethan Ryan also scored with Elliot Minchella scoring his 10th try of the season to ensure the Bulls progressed to the 5th Round and a tie against Super League side Warrington Wolves. However a trip to Cumbria to face former player Leon Pryce's side Workington Town brought the Bulls back to earth as their unbeaten start to the season ended with a 16-17 loss, Jake Butler-Fleming and Ross Peltier provided the tries for Bradford. Following the defeat it was announced that Jake Butler-Fleming would move back to Toronto Wolfpack in order to facilitate a move to York City Knights, meanwhile the Bulls announced that Jy Hitchcox from Castleford Tigers had joined on a month's loan alongside second rower James Laithwaite who is also on a month's loan from Toronto. The Bulls got back to winning ways with a 52-6 victory over Coventry Bears, new loanee Jy Hitchcox made his mark with two tries whilst Liam Johnson and George Flanagan also scored two each. Ashley Gibson, Joe Keyes, Elliot Minchella and Ethan Ryan rounded off the scoring. Bradford's Challenge Cup hopes were ended by Warrington in a 54-6 defeat with a try and goal coming from Joe Keyes. The month ended with a top of the table clash against Doncaster R.L.F.C. at the Keepmoat Stadium, the Bulls came away with a 32-6 victory as Elliot Minchella grabbed a brace with Flanagan, Ryan and Mikey Wood also scoring.

=== May 2018 ===
The Bulls posted a club record score of 124-0 against West Wales Raiders to go back to the top of the table. Elliot Minchella and Matt Garside both scored hat-tricks whilst Dane Chisholm, Dalton Grant, Brandon Pickersgill and Ethan Ryan scored two tries each. Further tries from Callum Bustin, George Flanagan, Vila Halafihi, Sam Hallas, James Laithwaite, Ross Peltier and Lee Smith ensured the Bulls came away with a heavy win. During the match Chisholm broke the club record for points scored in a match by coming away with 48 points and also broke the goal kicking record by nailing 20 out of 21 conversions. Another big win came in the rearranged league fixture against London Skolars. Bradford won the match 54-16, Ethan Ryan scoring four tries and fellow wing man Grant grabbing two. Bustin, Ashley Gibson, Peltier, Pickersgill and Smith also scored tries. A tough test followed this as the Bulls came away from Newcastle Thunder with a narrow 26-16 win. Chisholm, Flanagan, Minchella and Ryan all got on the scoresheet. Meanwhile, youngster Reiss Butterworth joined RFL Championship side Batley Bulldogs on loan for a month. The Bulls finished May with a comprehensive 68-0 win over Hemel Stags, Dalton Grant and Elliot Minchella grabbed the headlines scoring a brace of tries each while Chisholm, Flanagan, Garside, Halafihi, Laithwaite, Peltier, Pickersgill and Ryan also scored. Chisholm continued his fine form with the boot kicking 10 from 12.

=== June 2018 ===
June started with a 50-12 win against North Wales Crusaders. Matt Garside, Ethan Ryan and Lee Smith scored two tries, Dane Chisholm, Joe Keyes and Brandon Pickersgill also scored tries with Chisholm kicking 7 goals.

== Milestones ==
- Round 1: Gregg McNally, Dalton Grant, Elliot Minchella, Matt Garside, George Milton, Liam Johnson and Mikey Wood made their debuts for the Bulls.
- Round 1: Ashley Gibson and Elliot Minchella scored their 1st try for the Bulls.
- CCR3: Callum Bustin made his debut for the Bulls.
- CCR3: Steve Crossley made his 50th appearance for the Bulls.
- CCR3: Elliot Minchella scored his 1st five-haul try, 1st four-try haul and 1st hat-trick for the Bulls.
- CCR3: Liam Johnson, Gregg McNally and Callum Bustin scored their 1st try for the Bulls.
- CCR3: Joe Keyes reached 100 points for the Bulls.
- Round 3: George Flanagan made his debut for the Bulls.
- Round 3: George Flanagan and Dalton Grant scored their 1st try for the Bulls.
- Round 4: Jake Butler-Fleming made his debut for the Bulls.
- Round 4: Dalton Grant scored his 1st hat-trick for the Bulls.
- CCR4: Jordan Andrade made his debut for the Bulls.
- CCR4: Matt Garside scored his 1st try for the Bulls.
- Round 6: Jake Butler-Fleming scored his 1st try for the Bulls.
- Round 7: Jy Hitchcox and James Laithwaite made their debuts for the Bulls.
- Round 7: Jy Hitchcox scored his 1st try for the Bulls.
- Round 8: Mikey Wood scored his 1st try for the Bulls.
- Round 9: Elliot Minchella scored his 2nd hat-trick for the Bulls.
- Round 9: Matt Garside scored his 1st hat-trick for the Bulls.
- Round 9: Brandon Pickersgill and James Laithwaite scored their 1st try for the Bulls.
- Round 9: Dane Chisholm reached 100 points for the Bulls.
- Round 2: Rowan Milnes made his debut for the Bulls.
- Round 2: Ethan Ryan scored his 2nd four-try haul and 5th hat-trick for the Bulls.
- Round 10: Ethan Ryan made his 50th appearance for the Bulls.
- Round 13: Joe Keyes reached 200 points for the Bulls.
- Round 13: Dane Chisholm reached 200 points for the Bulls.
- Round 14: Ethan Ryan scored his 3rd four-try haul and 6th hat-trick for the Bulls.
- Round 14: Ethan Ryan scored his 50th try and reached 200 points for the Bulls.
- Round 15: Elliot Minchella scored his 3rd hat-trick for the Bulls.
- Round 15: George Milton scored his 1st try for the Bulls.
- Round 17: James Green made his debut for the Bulls.
- Round 19: Tuoyo Egodo made his debut for the Bulls.
- Round 19: James Green and Jordan Lilley scored their 1st try for the Bulls.
- Round 19: Ethan Ryan scored his 7th hat-trick for the Bulls.
- Round 19: Dane Chisholm kicked his 100th goal for the Bulls.
- Round 19: Dane Chisholm reached 300 points for the Bulls.
- Round 20: Jonny Pownall made his debut for the Bulls.
- Round 20: Sam Hallas made his 50th appearance for the Bulls.
- Round 20: Ethan Ryan scored his 8th hat-trick for the Bulls.
- Round 20: Elliot Minchella scored his 25th try and reached 100 points for the Bulls.
- Round 21: Liam Kirk made his 50th appearance for the Bulls.
- Round 21: Jonny Pownall and Tuoyo Egodo scored their 1st try for the Bulls.
- Round 22: Dane Chisholm scored his 25th try for the Bulls.
- Round 23: Ethan Ryan scored his 9th hat-trick for the Bulls.
- Round 23: Tuoyo Egodo scored his 1st hat-trick for the Bulls.
- Round 24: Jy Hitchcox scored his 1st hat-trick for the Bulls.
- Round 24: Elliot Minchella scored his 4th hat-trick for the Bulls.
- Round 24: Matthew Storton scored his 1st try for the Bulls.
- Round 24: Joe Keyes kicked his 100th goal for the Bulls.
- Round 26: Oliver Wilson made his debut for the Bulls.
- League 1 Final: Joe Keyes made his 50th appearance for the Bulls.
- League 1 Final: Jy Hitchcox scored his 2nd hat-trick for the Bulls.

== Pre-season friendlies ==
LEGEND
Win
Draw
Loss

Bulls score is first.

Date	Competition	Vrs	H/A	Venue	Result	Score	Tries	Goals	Att	Report
26 December 2017	Pre Season	Halifax RLFC	H	Odsal Stadium	W	22-6	Minchella (2), Grant, Kirk	Smith 2/3, Milnes 1/1	2,226	Report
14 January 2018	Pre Season	Sheffield Eagles	H	Odsal Stadium	W	12-6	Crossley, Grant	Milnes 2/2	1,428	Report
21 January 2018	Pre Season	Dewsbury Rams	A	Crown Flatt	L	0-24	-	-	1,012	Report
26 January 2018	Pre Season	Toronto Wolfpack	H	Odsal Stadium	L	0-34	-	-	2,461	Report
11 February 2018	Pre Season	Keighley Cougars	H	Odsal Stadium	W	28-20	Johnson (2), Brown, Minchella, Pickersgill	Keyes 4/5	1,395	Report

== Player appearances ==
- Friendly games only

FB=Fullback	C=Centre	W=Winger	SO=Stand Off	SH=Scrum half	P=Prop	H=Hooker	SR=Second Row	LF=Loose forward	B=Bench

No	Player	1	2	3	4	5
1	Lee Smith	SO	SO	x	C	C
2	Ethan Ryan	x	B	FB	W	FB
3	Ashley Gibson	C	C	x	C	
4	Ross Oakes	W	C	C		
5	Dalton Grant	B	W	x	W	W
6	Joe Keyes			B		SH
7	Dane Chisholm					
8	Liam Kirk	B	P	P	P	B
9	Sam Hallas	L	L	x	H	H
10	Steve Crossley	P	P	x	P	B
11	Matt Garside	SR	SR	x	SR	B
12	Elliot Minchella	SH	SH	x	SH	B
13	George Milton					L
14	Gregg McNally	x	x	x	FB	B
15	Callum Bustin					B
16	Danny King	B	B	C	B	SR
17	Ross Peltier	B	B	x	B	B
18	Liam Johnson	C	SR	SR	SR	B
19	Mikey Wood	P	B	L	B	P
20	Alex Brown	x	B	W	x	W
22	Jordan Andrade	x	x	x	B	P
24	Brandon Pickersgill	FB	FB	SO	SO	SO
25	Josh Rickett	W	W	W	B	B
26	Vila Halafihi	H	B	H	B	B
27	Reiss Butterworth	B	H	B	B	B
28	James Davies	x	B	P	B	x
29	Evan Hodgson	SR	B	SR	B	SR
30	Jamel Goodall	B	B	B	L	x
31	Oliver Wilson	x	x	B	x	x
32	Matthew Storton	x	x	B	x	x
33	Rowan Milnes	B	B	SH		x
n/a	Harvey Burnett	x	x	B	B	C
n/a	Tom Doyle	x	x	B	x	x
n/a	Alix Stephenson	x	x	B	x	x
n/a	Keelan Foster	x	x	B	x	x
n/a	Ebon Scurr	x	x	B	x	x

= Injured

= Suspended

== Table ==
Pos	Team	Pld	W	D	L	PF	PA	PD	Pts	Qualification
1	York City Knights	26	24	0	2	1130	308	+822	48	Champions
2	Bradford Bulls	26	23	0	3	1197	282	+915	46	Play-off semi-finals
3	Doncaster	26	19	0	7	956	497	+459	38	Play-off semi-finals
4	Workington Town	26	17	0	9	833	517	+316	34	Play-off semi-finals
5	Oldham	26	16	0	10	902	345	+557	32	Play-off semi-finals
6	Whitehaven	26	16	0	10	702	529	+173	32	
7	Hunslet	26	15	0	11	735	596	+139	30	
8	Newcastle Thunder	26	14	0	12	841	520	+321	28	
9	Keighley Cougars	26	13	0	13	841	657	+184	26	
10	North Wales Crusaders	26	9	1	16	589	660	−71	19	
11	Coventry Bears	26	7	0	19	406	1058	−652	14	
12	London Skolars	26	6	1	19	626	887	−261	13	
13	Hemel Stags	26	2	0	24	314	1286	−972	4	
14	West Wales Raiders	26	0	0	26	176	2106	−1930	−4 (Note: West Wales Raiders deducted four points post-season for fielding an ineligible player in two matches)	

== Fixtures and results ==
LEGEND
Win
Draw
Loss

2018 League 1

Date	Competition	Rnd	Vrs	H/A	Venue	Result	Score	Tries	Goals	Att	Live on TV	Report
18 February 2018	League 1	1	York City Knights	A	Bootham Crescent	W	22-20	Crossley, Gibson, Minchella	Keyes 5/6	4,281	-	Report
11 March 2018	League 1	3	Keighley Cougars	A	Cougar Park	W	54-6	Flanagan (2), Minchella (2), Grant, Hallas, Keyes, Peltier, Ryan	Keyes 9/10	2,912	-	Report
25 March 2018	League 1	4	Hunslet RLFC	H	Odsal Stadium	W	32-12	Grant (3), Hallas (2), Chisholm	Keyes 4/7	3,688	-	Report
30 March 2018	League 1	5	Oldham RLFC	H	Odsal Stadium	W	30-12	Grant (2), Chisholm, Minchella	Keyes 4/4, Smith 2/2, Chisholm 1/2	4,036	-	Report
8 April 2018	League 1	6	Workington Town	A	Derwent Park	L	16-17	Butler-Fleming, Peltier	Keyes 4/4	1,366	-	Report
15 April 2018	League 1	7	Coventry Bears	H	Odsal Stadium	W	52-6	Flanagan (2), Hitchcox (2), Johnson (2), Gibson, Keyes, Minchella, Ryan	Keyes 6/10	3,568	-	Report
29 April 2018	League 1	8	Doncaster RLFC	A	Keepmoat Stadium	W	32-6	Minchella (2), Flanagan, Ryan, Wood	Keyes 6/6	2,780	-	Report
6 May 2018	League 1	9	West Wales Raiders	H	Odsal Stadium	W	124-0	Minchella (3), Garside (3), Chisholm (2), Grant (2), Pickersgill (2), Ryan (2), Bustin, Flanagan, Halafihi, Hallas, Laithwaite, Peltier, Smith	Chisholm 20/21	3,298	-	Report
12 May 2018	League 1	2	London Skolars	H	Odsal Stadium	W	54-16	Ryan (4), Grant (2), Bustin, Gibson, Peltier, Pickersgill, Smith	Chisholm 5/11	3,041	-	Report
18 May 2018	League 1	10	Newcastle Thunder	A	Kingston Park	W	26-16	Chisholm, Flanagan, Minchella, Ryan	Chisholm 5/6	4,137	-	Report
27 May 2018	League 1	11	Hemel Stags	A	Pennine Way Stadium	W	68-0	Grant (2), Minchella (2), Chisholm, Flanagan, Garside, Halafihi, Laithwaite, Peltier, Pickersgill, Ryan	Chisholm 10/12	838	-	Report
9 June 2018	League 1	12	North Wales Crusaders	H	Odsal Stadium	W	50-12	Garside (2), Ryan (2), Smith (2), Chisholm, Keyes, Pickersgill	Chisholm 7/9	3,112	-	Report
17 June 2018	League 1	13	Whitehaven RLFC	A	Recreation Ground	W	27-20	Keyes (2), Crossley, Halafihi	Chisholm 5/6, Keyes 1 DG	1,476	-	Report
24 June 2018	League 1	14	Doncaster RLFC	H	Odsal Stadium	W	56-14	Ryan (4), Pickersgill (2), Bustin, Chisholm, Crossley, Laithwaite	Chisholm 8/10	4,220	-	Report
30 June 2018	League 1	15	Coventry Bears	A	Butts Park Arena	W	62-12	Minchella (3), Hallas (2), Johnson, Keyes, Laithwaite, Milton, Peltier, Ryan	Chisholm 9/11	1,476	-	Report
6 July 2018	League 1	16	Newcastle Thunder	H	Odsal Stadium	W	24-4	Chisholm, Pickersgill, Ryan	Chisholm 6/6	3,029	-	Report
15 July 2018	League 1	17	Hunslet RLFC	A	South Leeds Stadium	W	36-16	Flanagan (2), Gibson (2), Crossley, Keyes	Chisholm 6/8	1,536	-	Report
22 July 2018	League 1	18	York City Knights	H	Odsal Stadium	L	28-30	Grant (2), McNally, Peltier, Ryan	Chisholm 4/6	6,441	-	Report
28 July 2018	League 1	19	London Skolars	A	New River Stadium	W	58-12	Ryan (3), Chisholm (2), Green, Halafihi, Lilley, Minchella, Peltier, Pickersgill	Chisholm 7/11	1,178	-	Report
4 August 2018	League 1	20	Whitehaven RLFC	H	Odsal Stadium	W	46-0	Ryan (3), Minchella (2), Hallas, Lilley, Pickersgill	Chisholm 6/8, Lilley 1/1	2,818	-	Report
12 August 2018	League 1	21	North Wales Crusaders	A	Racecourse Ground	W	48-0	Chisholm (2), Egodo, Garside, Keyes, Minchella, Pownall, Ryan	Chisholm 8/9	886	-	Report
19 August 2018	League 1	22	Workington Town	H	Odsal Stadium	L	18-24	Chisholm, Garside, Minchella	Chisholm 0/1, Lilley 3/4, Keyes 0/1	3,320	-	Report
2 September 2018	League 1	23	Keighley Cougars	H	Odsal Stadium	W	54-4	Egodo (3), Ryan (3), Flanagan (2), Keyes, Minchella	Keyes 7/10	3,119	-	Report
9 September 2018	League 1	24	West Wales Raiders	A	Stebonheath Park	W	104-0	Hitchcox (3), Minchella (3), Bustin (2), Grant (2), McNally (2), Ryan (2), Chisholm, Crossley, Egodo, Peltier, Storton	Keyes 14/19	826	-	Report
16 September 2018	League 1	25	Oldham RLFC	A	Whitebank Stadium	W	24-16	Flanagan, Hitchcox, Peltier, Storton	Keyes 4/4	1,038	-	Report
23 September 2018	League 1	26	Hemel Stags	H	Odsal Stadium	W	52-7	Grant (2), Pownall (2), Storton (2), Bustin, Hitchcox, Oakes, Pickersgill	Chisholm 6/10	2,885	-	Report
30 September 2018	League 1	SF	Oldham RLFC	H	Odsal Stadium	W	47-0	Minchella (2), Ryan (2), Gibson, Hitchcox, Keyes, Peltier	Keyes 7/10, Chisholm 1 DG	2,788	-	Report

== Player appearances ==
- League 1 only

FB=Fullback	C=Centre	W=Winger	SO=Stand-off	SH=Scrum half	PR=Prop	H=Hooker	SR=Second Row	L=Loose forward	B=Bench

No	Player	1	3	4	5	6	7	8	9	2	10	11	12	13	14	15	16	17	18	19	20	21	22	23	24	25	26	SF
1	Lee Smith	C	C	x	C			C	C	C	C	C	C	C	C													
2	Ethan Ryan	W	W	W	W	W	W	W	W	W	W	W	W	W	W	W	W	W	W	W	W	W	W	W	W	W	x	W
3	Ashley Gibson	C	C	C	C	x	C	C	C	C	C	C	C	C	C	C	C	C						C		C	C	C
4	Ross Oakes		x	x	x	C	x	x	x	x	x	x	x	x	x	C	C	C	C	C	C	C	C	x	x	x	B	x
5	Dalton Grant	W	W	W	W	W	W		W	W	W	W	W	W	W	W	W	W	W	W	W	W	W	x	W	x	W	x
6	Joe Keyes	SO	SO	SO	SO	SO	SO	SO					SO	SO	SO	SO	SO	SO	SO			B	B	SO	SO	SO	x	SO
7	Dane Chisholm		B	SH	SH	SH	SH	SH	SH	SH	SH	SH	SH	SH	SH	SH	SH	SH	SH	SH	SH	SH	SH	x	SH	SH	SH	SH
8	Liam Kirk	P	x	x	x	x	P	B	P	x	B	x	P	P	B	P	B	x	B	B	B	B	B	P	P	P	x	P
9	Sam Hallas	H	H	H	H	H	B	H	L	B	x	L	H	B	B	H	H	H	H	x	H	H	L	H		x	H	x
10	Steve Crossley	P	P	P	P	P	P	P	x	P	P	P	P	P	P	x	P	P	P	P	P	P	P	P	B	P	x	P
11	Matt Garside	SR	SR	SR	SR	SR	x	SR	SR	SR	SR	SR	SR	SR	SR		B	SR	SR	SR	SR	SR	SR	SR			SR	B
12	Elliot Minchella	SH	SR	SR	SR	SR	B	L	B	L	SO	SO	L	L		SR	SR	L	SR	SR	SR	SR	SR	SR	SR	SR	x	SR
13	George Milton	L	L	L	L	L	L				L					B				B					L		L	x
14	Gregg McNally	FB	FB	FB	FB								B					FB	FB					FB	FB	x	x	FB
15	Callum Bustin	x	P	P	P	P	B	P	P	P	P	P			P	P	P	P	P						P	B	P	
16	Danny King	x	x	x	x	x	x	x	x	x	x	x	x	x	x	x	x	x	x	x	x	x	x	x	x	x	x	x
17	Ross Peltier	B	B	B	B	B	x	B	B	B	B	B	B	B	B	B	B	B	B	B	B	B	x	B	B	B	B	B
18	Liam Johnson	SR	x	B	B	B	SR		x	x	x	B	x	B	B	SR	x	x	C				x	x	B	x	x	x
19	Mikey Wood	B	B	B	B	B	x	B	B	B	x	B	B	B	L	L	L	B	L	L	L	L	B	L	B	L	x	L
20	Alex Brown			x	x	x	x	x	x	x	x	x	x	x	x	x	x	x	x	x	x	x	x	x	x	x	x	x
21	George Flanagan	x	B	B	B	B	B	B	H	H	B	B						B	B	H			H	B	x	B	x	B
22	Jordan Andrade	x	x	x	x	x	x	x	x	x	x	x	x	x	x	x	x	x	x	x	x	x	x	x	x	x	x	x
23	Jake Butler-Fleming	x	x	C	x	C	x	x	x	x	x	x	x	x	x	x	x	x	x	x	x	x	x	x	x	x	x	x
24	Brandon Pickersgill	B	SH	x	x	FB	FB	FB	SO	FB	FB	FB	FB	FB	FB	FB	FB	x	x	FB	FB	FB	FB	B	x	FB	FB	x
25	Josh Rickett	x	x	x	x	x	x	x	x	x	x	x	x	x	x	x	x	x	x	x	x	x	x	x	x	x	x	x
26	Vila Halafihi	B	x	x	x	x	H	x	B	B	H	H	B	H	H	B	B	x	x	B	B	x	x	x	x	x	B	x
27	Reiss Butterworth	x	x	x	x	x	x	x	x	x	x	x	x	x	x	x	x	x	x	x	x	x	x	x	x	x	x	x
28	James Davies	x	x	x	x	x	x	x	x	x	x	x	x	x	x	x	x	x	x	x	x	x	x	x	x	x	x	x
29	Evan Hodgson	x	x	x	x	x	x	x	x	x	x	x	x	x	x	x	x	x	x	x	x	x	x	x	x	x	x	x
30	Jamel Goodall		x	x	x	x	x	x	x	x	x	x	x	x	x	x	x	x	x	x	x	x	x	x	x	x	x	x
31	Oliver Wilson	x	x	x	x	x	x	x	x	x	x	x	x	x	x	x	x	x	x	x	x	x	x	x	x	x	B	x
32	Matthew Storton	x	x	x	x	x	x	x	x	x	x	x	x	x	x	x	x	x	x	x	x	x	x	x	SR	SR	SR	SR
33	Rowan Milnes	x	x	x	x	x	x	x	x	SO	B	x	x	x	x	x	x	x	x	x	x	x	x	x	x	x	x	x
35	Jy Hitchcox	x	x	x	x	x	C	W	FB	x	x	x	x	x	x	x	x	x	x	x	x	x	x	x	C	W	C	W
36	James Laithwaite	x	x	x	x	x	SR	SR	SR	SR	SR	SR	SR	SR	SR	B	SR	SR										
37	James Green	x	x	x	x	x	x	x	x	x	x	x	x	x	x	x	x	B	B	P	P	P	P	B	x	B	P	B
38	Jordan Lilley	x	x	x	x	x	x	x	x	x	x	x	x	x	x	x	x	x	x	SO	SO	SO	SO	SH	H	H	SO	H
39	Tuoyo Egodo	x	x	x	x	x	x	x	x	x	x	x	x	x	x	x	x	x	x	C	C	C	C	C	C	C	x	C
40	Jonny Pownall	x	x	x	x	x	x	x	x	x	x	x	x	x	x	x	x	x	x	x	B	B	B	W	x	x	W	x

= Injured

= Suspended

== League 1 Playoff Final ==
After finishing 2nd in the 2018 RFL League 1 season and beating Oldham R.L.F.C. in the Semi Final the Bulls qualified for the League 1 Playoff Final, Workington Town finished 4th in the table and beat Doncaster R.L.F.C. in the Semi Final meaning that the two teams would meet in a play-off match to determine who would be promoted to the RFL Championship in 2019.

LEGEND
Win
Draw
Loss

Date	Competition	Vrs	H/A	Venue	Result	Score	Tries	Goals	Att	Live on TV	Report
7 October 2018	Final	Workington Town	H	Odsal Stadium	W	27-8	Hitchcox (3), Chisholm, Flanagan, Keyes	Chisholm 1/3, Keyes 0/2, Crossley 0/1, Chisholm 1 DG	6,011	-	Report

2018 League 1 Playoff Final
Bradford Bulls	positions	Workington Town
14. Gregg McNally	Fullback	24. Tyllar Mellor
2. Ethan Ryan	Winger	2. Joe Hambley
3. Ashley Gibson	Centre	3. Elliott Miller
4. Ross Oakes	Centre	16. Ben Morris
35. Jy Hitchcox	Winger	2. Scott Rooke
6. Joe Keyes	Stand off	6. Jamie Doran
7. Dane Chisholm	Scrum half	7. Carl Forber
8. Liam Kirk	Prop	8. Oliver Wilkes
38. Jordan Lilley	Hooker	20. Sean Penkywicz
10. Steve Crossley	Prop	23. Tyler Dickinson
11. Matt Garside	2nd Row	18. Karl Olstrom
12. Elliot Minchella	2nd Row	21. Jacob Moore
19. Mikey Wood	Loose forward	10. Stevey Scholey
17. Ross Peltier	Interchange	9. James Newton
21. George Flanagan	Interchange	11. Andrew Dawson
32. Matthew Storton	Interchange	15. Tom Curwen
37. James Green	Interchange	17. Fuifui Moimoi
John Kear	Coach	Leon Pryce

== Challenge Cup ==
LEGEND
Win
Draw
Loss

Date	Competition	Rnd	Vrs	H/A	Venue	Result	Score	Tries	Goals	Att	TV	Report
25 February 2018	Cup	3rd	West Wales Raiders	H	Odsal Stadium	W	82-6	Minchella (5), Gibson (2), Johnson (2), McNally (2), Bustin, Chisholm, Crossley, Ryan	Keyes 11/15	1,505	-	Report
2 April 2018	Cup	4th	Hunslet RLFC	A	South Leeds Stadium	W	34-10	Garside, Johnson, Minchella, Rickett, Ryan	Chisholm 7/8	1,081	-	Report
21 April 2018	Cup	5th	Warrington Wolves	A	Halliwell Jones Stadium	L	6-54	Keyes	Keyes 1/1	4,710	-	Report

== Player appearances ==
- Challenge Cup games only

FB=Fullback	C=Centre	W=Winger	SO=Stand Off	SH=Scrum half	P=Prop	H=Hooker	SR=Second Row	L=Loose forward	B=Bench

No	Player	3	4	5
1	Lee Smith	C	x	
2	Ethan Ryan	W	W	W
3	Ashley Gibson	C	C	C
4	Ross Oakes		C	C
5	Dalton Grant	W		W
6	Joe Keyes	SO		SO
7	Dane Chisholm	B	SH	Red card
8	Liam Kirk		P	P
9	Sam Hallas	H	x	x
10	Steve Crossley	P	B	P
11	Matt Garside	x	SR	SR
12	Elliot Minchella	SR	B	SH
13	George Milton	L	x	L
14	Gregg McNally	FB	FB	
15	Callum Bustin	B	x	B
16	Danny King	x	x	x
17	Ross Peltier	P	P	B
18	Liam Johnson	SR	SR	SR
19	Mikey Wood	B	L	B
20	Alex Brown	x	x	x
21	George Flanagan	x	B	B
22	Jordan Andrade	x	B	x
23	Jake Butler-Fleming	x	x	x
24	Brandon Pickersgill	SH	SO	FB
25	Josh Rickett	x	W	x
26	Vila Halafihi	B	H	H
27	Reiss Butterworth	x	x	x
28	James Davies	x	x	x
29	Evan Hodgson	x	x	x
30	Jamel Goodall		x	x
31	Oliver Wilson	x	x	x
32	Matthew Storton	x	x	x
33	Rowan Milnes	x	x	x

== Squad statistics ==
- Appearances and Points include (Super League, Challenge Cup and Play-offs) as of 7 October 2018.

No	Player	Position	Age	Previous club	Apps	Tries	Goals	DG	Points
1	Lee Smith	Fullback	31	Leigh Centurions	12	4	2	0	20
2	Ethan Ryan	Wing	21	Bradford Bulls Academy	30	36	0	0	144
3	Ashley Gibson	Centre	31	Wakefield Trinity	24	8	0	0	32
4	Ross Oakes	Centre	21	Bradford Bulls Academy	13	1	0	0	4
5	Dalton Grant	Wing	27	London Broncos	25	18	0	0	72
6	Joe Keyes	Stand off	22	London Broncos	23	12	82	1	213
7	Dane Chisholm	Scrum half	27	Sheffield Eagles	28	17	121	2	312
8	Liam Kirk	Prop	20	Bradford Bulls Academy	22	0	0	0	0
9	Sam Hallas	Hooker	21	Leeds Rhinos	23	7	0	0	28
10	Steve Crossley	Prop	28	Toronto Wolfpack	28	6	0	0	24
11	Matt Garside	Second row	27	London Broncos	26	9	0	0	36
12	Elliot Minchella	Second row	22	Sheffield Eagles	29	33	0	0	132
13	George Milton	Loose forward	n/a	Hull Kingston Rovers	13	1	0	0	4
14	Gregg McNally	Fullback	27	Leigh Centurions	13	5	0	0	20
15	Callum Bustin	Centre	20	Castleford Tigers (Loan)	20	7	0	0	28
17	Ross Peltier	Prop	25	Keighley Cougars	29	11	0	0	44
18	Liam Johnson	Second row	20	Huddersfield Giants (Loan)	14	6	0	0	24
19	Mikey Wood	Second row	21	Huddersfield Giants (Loan)	28	1	0	0	4
20	Alex Brown	Wing	30	Batley Bulldogs	0	0	0	0	0
21	George Flanagan	Hooker	31	Hunslet R.L.F.C.	20	14	0	0	56
22	Jordan Andrade	Prop	n/a	Trialist	1	0	0	0	0
23	Jake Butler-Fleming	Centre	n/a	Toronto Wolfpack (Loan)	2	1	0	0	4
24	Brandon Pickersgill	Fullback	20	Bradford Bulls Academy	24	11	0	0	44
25	Josh Rickett	Wing	19	Bradford Bulls Academy	1	1	0	0	4
26	Vila Halafihi	Hooker	24	Penrith Panthers	17	4	0	0	16
27	Reiss Butterworth	Hooker	18	Bradford Bulls Academy	0	0	0	0	0
28	James Davies	Prop	24	Unattached	0	0	0	0	0
29	Evan Hodgson	Prop	20	Bradford Bulls Academy	0	0	0	0	0
30	Jamel Goodall	Loose forward	20	Castleford Tigers	0	0	0	0	0
31	Oliver Wilson	Prop	17	Bradford Bulls Academy	1	0	0	0	0
32	Matthew Storton	Second row	18	Bradford Bulls Academy	5	4	0	0	16
33	Rowan Milnes	Scrum half	18	Bradford Bulls Academy	2	0	0	0	0
35	Jy Hitchcox	Wing	28	Castleford Tigers (Loan)	8	11	0	0	44
36	James Laithwaite	Second row	26	Toronto Wolfpack (Loan)	12	4	0	0	16
37	James Green	Prop	27	Castleford Tigers (Loan)	11	1	0	0	4
38	Jordan Lilley	Scrum half	21	Leeds Rhinos (Loan)	10	2	4	0	16
39	Tuoyo Egodo	Centre	21	Castleford Tigers (Loan)	8	5	0	0	20
40	Jonny Pownall	Wing	25	Toronto Wolfpack (Loan)	5	3	0	0	12

== Transfers ==
=== In ===
	Name	Position	Signed from	Date
(England)	Elliot Minchella	Loose forward	Sheffield Eagles	September 2017
(England)	Matt Garside	Second row	London Broncos	September 2017
(England)	Mikey Wood	Second row	Huddersfield Giants (Loan)	October 2017
(England)	George Milton	Prop	Hull Kingston Rovers	October 2017
(England)	Steve Crossley	Prop	Toronto Wolfpack	October 2017
(England)	Liam Johnson	Second row	Huddersfield Giants (Loan)	November 2017
(England)	Jamel Goodall	Loose forward	Castleford Tigers	December 2017
(England)	Callum Bustin	Centre	Castleford Tigers (Loan)	December 2017
(Wales)	Dalton Grant	Wing	London Broncos	December 2017
(England)	Alex Brown	Wing	Batley Bulldogs	December 2017
(England)	Gregg McNally	Fullback	Leigh Centurions	January 2018
(England)	George Flanagan	Hooker	Hunslet R.L.F.C.	February 2018
(England)	Danny King	Second row	Trialist	March 2018
(England)	Harvey Burnett	Centre	Trialist	March 2018
(England)	Jordan Andrade	Prop	Trialist	March 2018
(Australia)	Jake Butler-Fleming	Centre	Toronto Wolfpack (Loan)	March 2018
(England)	Jy Hitchcox	Wing	Castleford Tigers (Loan)	April 2018
(England)	James Laithwaite	Second row	Toronto Wolfpack (Loan)	April 2018
(England)	James Green	Prop	Castleford Tigers (Loan)	July 2018
(England)	Jordan Lilley	Scrum half	Leeds Rhinos (Loan)	July 2018
(England)	Tuoyo Egodo	Wing	Castleford Tigers (Loan)	July 2018
(England)	Jonny Pownall	Wing	Toronto Wolfpack (Loan)	July 2018

=== Out ===
	Name	Position	Club Signed	Date
(England)	Jonathan Walker	Prop	Released	April 2017
(England)	Keenan Tomlinson	Second row	Batley Bulldogs	July 2017
(England)	James Bentley	Second row	St. Helens	August 2017
(England)	Colton Roche	Second row	Huddersfield Giants	September 2017
(England)	James Mendeika	Centre	Released	September 2017
(England)	Omari Caro	Wing	London Skolars	September 2017
(England)	Johnny Campbell	Wing	Batley Bulldogs	September 2017
(England)	Scott Moore	Hooker	Released	September 2017
(England)	Wilf Moxon	Prop	Wakefield Trinity	September 2017
(England)	Joe Lumb	Hooker	Keighley Cougars	September 2017
(England)	Brandan Wilkinson	Second row	Doncaster	October 2017
(England)	Iliess Macani	Wing	Sheffield Eagles	November 2017
(Malta)	Jon Magrin	Prop	Sheffield Eagles	November 2017
(Australia)	Damien Sironen	Prop	Released	December 2017
(England)	Oscar Thomas	Fullback	Sheffield Eagles	December 2017
(Australia)	Willie Tonga	Centre	Retirement	December 2017
(England)	Alex Brown	Wing	Retirement	March 2018
