= 2018 Huddersfield Giants season =

- Challenge Cup: Quarter-finals

Team information
- Chairman: Ken Davy
- Head Coach: Rick Stone (until March); Chris Thorman (after March as interim Head Coach)
- Captain: Leroy Cudjoe
- Stadium: John Smith's Stadium; Huddersfield, West Yorkshire
← 2017	List of seasons	2019 →

This article details the Huddersfield Giants Rugby League Football Club's 2018 season.

== Results ==
=== Super League ===
==== League table ====
Pos	Team	Pld	W	D	L	PF	PA	PD	Pts	Qualification
1	St. Helens	23	21	0	2	713	298	+415	42	Super League Super 8s
2	Wigan Warriors	23	16	0	7	573	345	+228	32	Super League Super 8s
3	Castleford Tigers	23	15	1	7	567	480	+87	31	Super League Super 8s
4	Warrington Wolves	23	14	1	8	531	410	+121	29	Super League Super 8s
5	Huddersfield Giants	23	11	1	11	427	629	−202	23	Super League Super 8s
6	Hull F.C.	23	11	0	12	534	544	−10	22	Super League Super 8s
7	Wakefield Trinity	23	10	1	12	581	506	+75	21	Super League Super 8s
8	Catalans Dragons	23	10	1	12	488	531	−43	21	Super League Super 8s
9	Leeds Rhinos	23	8	2	13	441	527	−86	18	The Qualifiers
10	Hull KR	23	8	1	14	476	582	−106	17	The Qualifiers
11	Salford Red Devils	23	7	0	16	384	597	−213	14	The Qualifiers
12	Widnes Vikings	23	3	0	20	387	653	−266	6	The Qualifiers

Source: Rugby League Project

==== Super League results ====
W Win D Draw L Loss

Super League results
Date	Round	Versus	H/A	Venue	Result	Score	Tries	Goals	Attendance	Report
1 February	1	Hull F.C.	A	KCOM Stadium	L	12–38			13,704	RLP
8 February	2	Warrington Wolves	H	John Smiths Stadium	W	20–6			5,104	RLP
23 February	3	St Helens	H	John Smiths Stadium	L	12–26			5,915	RLP
4 March	4	Wakefield Trinity	A	Mobile Rocket Stadium	L	4–22			4,055	RLP
9 March	5	Widnes Vikings	A	Halton Stadium	W	28–16			4,298	RLP
15 March	6	Hull Kingston Rovers	H	John Smiths Stadium	L	6–38			4,612	RLP
23 March	7	Wigan Warriors	A	DW Stadium	L	10–48			10,641	RLP
30 March	8	Leeds Rhinos	H	John Smiths Stadium	D	22–22			7,544	RLP
2 April	9	Catalans Dragons	A	Stade Gilbert Brutus	L	6–27			8,853	RLP
8 April	10	Castleford Tigers	H	John Smiths Stadium	L	28–40			5,945	RLP
15 April	11	Salford Red Devils	H	John Smiths Stadium	L	12–30			4,385	RLP
20 April	12	St Helens	A	Totally Wicked Stadium	L	4–66			10,278	RLP
27 April	13	Warrington Wolves	A	Halliwell Jones Stadium	L	4–38			8,792	RLP
4 May	14	Widnes Vikings	H	John Smiths Stadium	W	28–18			4,645	RLP
20 May	15	Wakefield Trinity	N	St James' Park	W	25–22			25,438	RLP
25 May	16	Salford Red Devils	A	AJ Bell Stadium	W	24–16			2,342	RLP
8 June	17	Leeds Rhinos	A	Headingley Stadium	W	25–18			11,051	RLP
15 June	18	Catalans Dragons	H	John Smiths Stadium	W	26–25			9,121	RLP
29 June	19	Hull Kingston Rovers	A	KCOM Craven Park	L	10–37			7,080	RLP
5 July	20	Hull F.C.	H	John Smiths Stadium	W	29–18			4,696	RLP
12 July	21	Wigan Warriors	H	John Smiths Stadium	W	20–12			5,264	RLP
20 July	22	Castleford Tigers	A	Mend-A-Hose Jungle	W	32–18			5,406	RLP
27 July	23	Wakefield Trinity	H	John Smiths Stadium	W	16–12			5,697	RLP

=== Super 8s ===
==== Super 8s table ====
Pos	Team	Pld	W	D	L	PF	PA	PD	Pts	Qualification
1	St. Helens (L)	30	26	0	4	895	408	+487	52	Semi-finals
2	Wigan Warriors (C)	30	23	0	7	740	417	+323	46	Semi-finals
3	Castleford Tigers	30	20	1	9	767	582	+185	41	Semi-finals
4	Warrington Wolves	30	18	1	11	767	561	+206	37	Semi-finals
5	Wakefield Trinity	30	13	1	16	747	696	+51	27	
6	Huddersfield Giants	30	13	1	16	539	794	−255	27	
7	Catalans Dragons	30	12	1	17	596	750	−154	25	
8	Hull F.C.	30	11	0	19	615	787	−172	22	

Source: Rugby League Project
(C) Champions; (L) League Leaders' Shield Winners

==== Super 8s results ====
Super 8s results
Date	Round	Versus	H/A	Venue	Result	Score	Tries	Goals	Attendance	Report
10 August	S1	St Helens	A	Totally Wicked Stadium	W	16–12			8,979	RLP
17 August	S2	Hull F.C.	H	John Smiths Stadium	W	26–6			4,499	RLP
31 August	S3	Wakefield Trinity	H	John Smiths Stadium	L	16–42			4,963	RLP
7 September	S4	Warrington Wolves	A	Halliwell Jones Stadium	L	24–26			9,076	RLP
13 September	S5	Castleford Tigers	A	Mend-A-Hose Jungle	L	12–44			7,279	RLP
20 September	S6	Wigan Warriors	H	John Smiths Stadium	L	6–13			4,197	RLP
29 September	S7	Catalans Dragons	A	Stade Gilbert Brutus	L	12–22			7,304	RLP

=== Challenge Cup ===
W Win L Loss

Challenge Cup results
Date	Round	Versus	H/A	Venue	Result	Score	Tries	Goals	Attendance	Report
11 May	6	Wakefield Trinity	H	John Smiths Stadium	W	24–14			2,631	RLP
31 May	Quarter-finals	Catalans Dragons	H	John Smiths Stadium	L	6–20			2,151	RLP

== Players ==
=== Transfers ===
==== In ====
List of players joining Huddersfield
Name	Signed from	Contract	Date
Jordan Rankin	Wests Tigers	3 Years	August 2017
Adam Walne	Salford Red Devils	3 Years	September 2017
Colton Roche	Bradford Bulls	2 Years	October 2017

==== Out ====
List of players leaving Huddersfield
Name	Signed for	Contract	Date
Sam Rapira	Toulouse Olympique	1 Year	September 2017
Harry Woollard	Dewsbury Rams	1 Year	September 2017
Mikey Wood	Bradford Bulls	1 Year (Loan)	October 2017
Jamie Ellis	Castleford Tigers	3 Years	October 2017
Nathan Mason	Leigh Centurions	1 Year (Loan)	October 2017
Izaac Farrell	Batley Bulldogs	1 Year (Loan)	November 2017
Liam Johnson	Bradford Bulls	1 Year (Loan)	November 2017
Billy Hayes	Dewsbury Rams	1 Year	November 2017
Jared Simpson	Dewsbury Rams	1 Year (Loan)	December 2017
