= Vila Halafihi =

English rugby league footballer

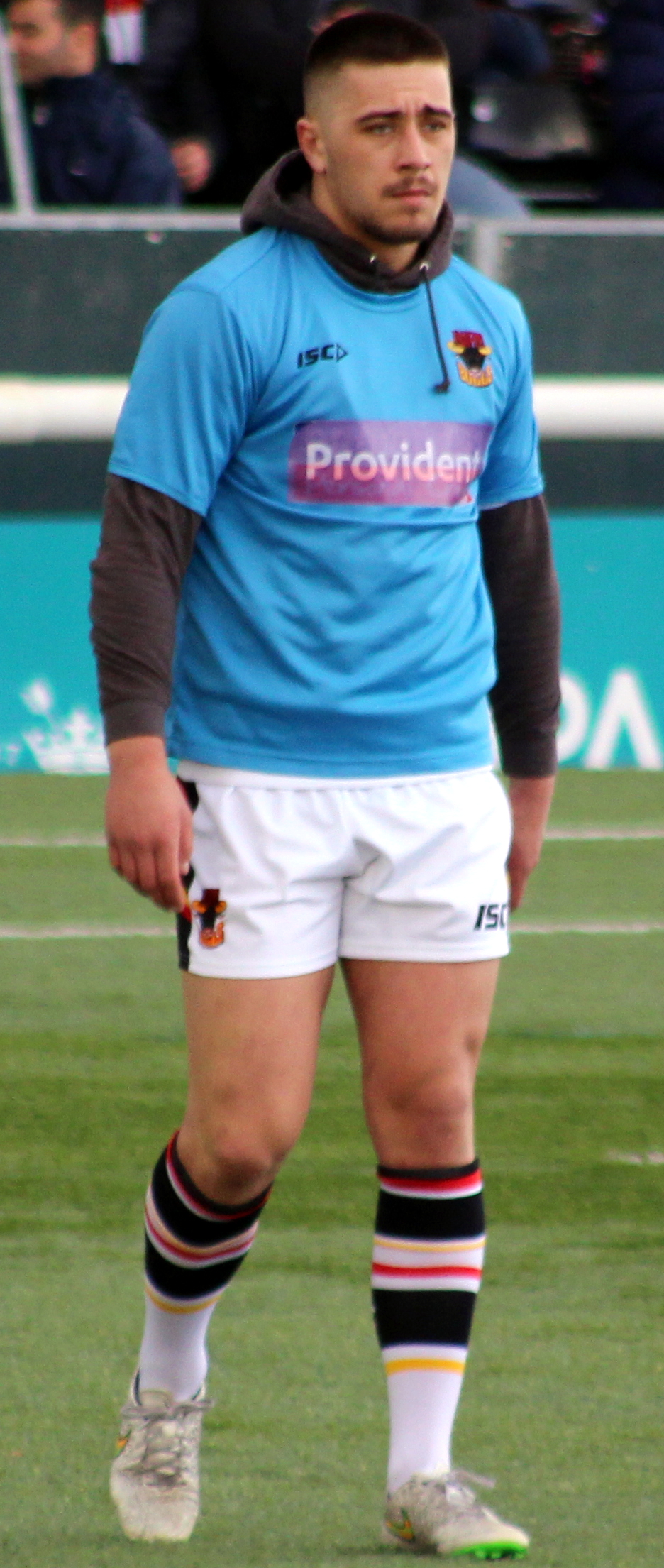

Personal information
- Full name: Vila Halafihi
- Born: 24 January 1994 (age 32) Leeds, England
- Height: 6 ft 0 in (1.83 m)
- Weight: 98 kg (15 st 6 lb)

Playing information
- Position: Hooker, Lock
Club
Years	Team	Pld	T	G	FG	P
2013	Leeds Rhinos	0	0	0	0	0
2014	Penrith Panthers	0	0	0	0	0
2015–18	Bradford Bulls	39	8	0	0	32
2015(loan)	→ Oxford Rugby League	2	1	0	0	4
2016(loan)	→ Swinton Lions	5	1	0	0	4
2019–21	Hunslet RLFC	44	14	0	0	56
2022–24	Sheffield Eagles	28	5	0	0	20
2025–	Halifax Panthers	7	1	0	0	4
	Total	125	30	0	0	120
- Source: As of 6 June 2025

Vila Halafihi (born 24 January 1994) is an English professional rugby league footballer who plays as a hooker for Halifax Panthers in the RFL Championship.

He is the son of former Hull KR, Sheffield Eagles and London Crusaders forward Nick Halafihi.

Halafihi was a product of the Leeds academy system.

== Playing career ==
=== Bradford Bulls ===
2015 - 2015 Season

Halafihi signed for Championship side Bradford on a one-year deal. He featured in the pre-season friendlies against Castleford and Leeds.

He featured in Round 8 (Dewsbury) then in Round 10 (Doncaster). He played in Round 19 (Batley) to Round 20 (Hunslet). Halafihi played in Round 23 (Halifax) then in Qualifier 7 (Halifax).

He signed a two-year extension to his contract at the end of the season.

2016 - 2016 Season

Halafihi played in the pre-season friendlies against Leeds and Castleford.

2017 - 2017 Season

Halafihi re-signed with the Bradford club following the clubs liquidation at the end of the 2016 season.

He featured in the pre-season friendlies against Huddersfield and Keighley.

Halafihi played in Round 3 (Swinton Lions) then in Round 7 (Dewsbury) to Round 8 (Oldham). He also featured in Round 11 (Featherstone Rovers) and Round 14 (London Broncos) then in Round 16 (Dewsbury) to Round 17 (Featherstone Rovers). He featured in Round 20 (Halifax). Halafihi played in the Championship Shield Game 1 (Toulouse Olympique) to Game 7 (Rochdale Hornets). He also played in the 2017 Challenge Cup in Round 4 (Featherstone Rovers).

He signed a two-year contract extension at the end of the season.

2018 - 2018 Season

Halafihi featured in the pre-season friendlies against Halifax, Sheffield Eagles, Dewsbury, Toronto Wolfpack and Keighley.

He featured in Round 1 (York City Knights) to Round 2 (London Skolars) then in Round 7 (Coventry Bears). He also played in Round 9 (West Wales Raiders) to Round 16 (Newcastle Thunder) then in Round 19 (London Skolars) to Round 20 (Whitehaven R.L.F.C.). Vila played in Round 26 (Hemel Stags). Halafihi played in the 2018 Challenge Cup in Round 3 (West Wales Raiders) to Round 5 (Warrington). He scored against West Wales Raiders (1 try), Hemel Stags (1 try), Whitehaven R.L.F.C. (1 try) and London Skolars (1 try).

=== Hunslet RLFC ===
On 2 November 2018, it was reported that Halafihi had joined Hunslet RLFC.

=== Sheffield Eagles ===
In October 2021, Halafihi joined Sheffield Eagles on a two-year deal.

He decided to retire at the end of the 2024 season.

=== Halifax Panthers ===
On 6 June 2025 it was reported that he had signed for Halifax Panthers in the RFL Championship, reversing his retirement decision.

== Statistics ==
Statistics do not include pre-season friendlies.

Season	Appearance	Tries	Goals	F/G	Points
2015 Bradford	6	0	0	0	0
2016 Bradford	0	0	0	0	0
2017 Bradford	16	4	0	0	16
2018 Bradford	17	4	0	0	16
Total	39	8	0	0	32
