= Josh Rickett =

English rugby league footballer

Personal information
- Full name: Joshua Rickett
- Born: 20 October 1997 (age 28) Halifax, West Yorkshire, England
- Height: 6 ft 1 in (1.85 m)
- Weight: 13 st 2 lb (83 kg)

Playing information
- Position: Wing, Fullback
Club
Years	Team	Pld	T	G	FG	P
2016–19	Bradford Bulls	6	2	0	0	8
2020–21	Doncaster	3	1	0	0	4
	Total	9	3	0	0	12
- Source: As of 7 January 2023

Josh Rickett (born 20 October 1997) is an English professional rugby league footballer who last played for Doncaster in the Championship. He plays as a wing or fullback.

He was a product of the Bradford Bulls Academy system.

== Background ==
Rickett was born in Halifax, West Yorkshire, England.

== Bradford Bulls ==
2016 - 2016 Season

Rickett made his début for Bradford Bulls in the Championship Shield Game 6 against Workington Town.

2017 - 2017 Season

Rickett featured in the pre-season friendlies against Huddersfield and the Keighley Cougars.

Rickett featured in round 23 Swinton then in the Championship Shield Game 1 Toulouse Olympique to Game 2 Oldham then in Game 4 Batley. At the end of the season he signed a two-year extension to his contract.

2018 - 2018 Season

Rickett featured in the pre-season friendlies against Halifax R.L.F.C., Sheffield and Dewsbury. He featured in the 2018 Challenge Cup in round 4 Hunslet R.L.F.C..

2019 - 2019 Season

Rickett featured in the pre-season friendly against York. At the end of the season, following the club's financial troubles, Rickett signed for Doncaster R.L.F.C.

== Statistics ==
Statistics do not include pre-season friendlies.

Season	Appearance	Tries	Goals	F/G	Points
2016 Bradford Bulls	1	0	0	0	0
2017 Bradford Bulls	4	1	0	0	4
2018 Bradford Bulls	1	1	0	0	4
2019 Bradford Bulls	0	0	0	0	0
Total	6	2	0	0	8
