= Ashley Gibson =

England international rugby league footballer

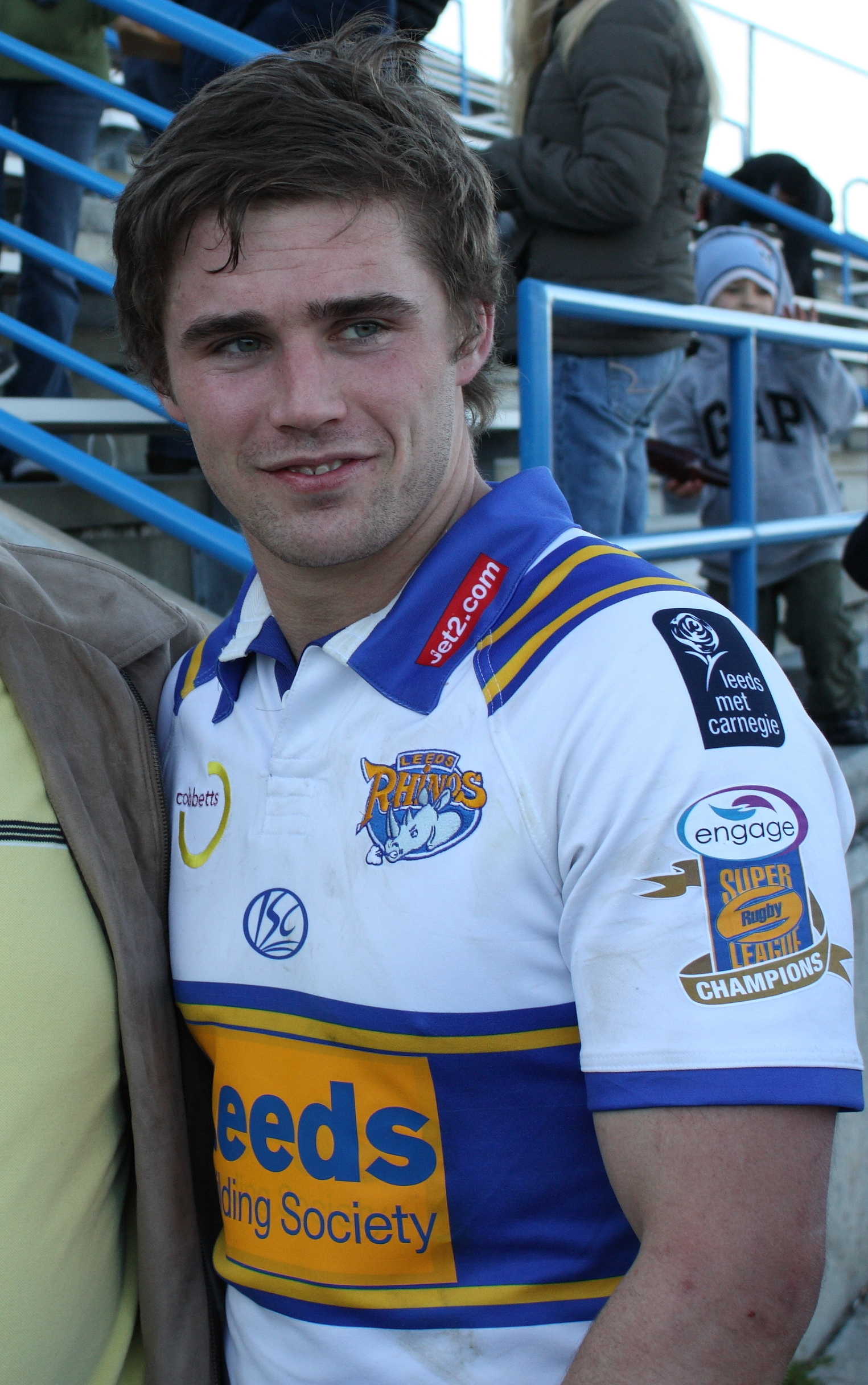

Personal information
- Full name: Ashley Gibson
- Born: 25 September 1986 (age 40) Leeds, West Yorkshire, England
- Height: 5 ft 11 in (180 cm)
- Weight: 14 st 5 lb (91 kg)

Playing information
- Position: Wing, Centre
Club
Years	Team	Pld	T	G	FG	P
2005–09	Leeds Rhinos	36	14	9	0	74
2010–13	Salford City Reds	87	43	0	0	172
2014–15	Castleford Tigers	29	11	0	0	44
2016–17	Wakefield Trinity	12	5	0	0	20
2017 (loan)	→Oxford	1	0	0	0	0
2017 (loan)	→Dewsbury Rams	1	0	0	0	0
2017–19	Bradford Bulls	30	8	0	0	32
2020	Newcastle Thunder	4	2	0	0	8
	Total	200	83	9	0	350
Representative
Years	Team	Pld	T	G	FG	P
2006–06	England	4	2	0	0	8
2006	England A	3	2	0	0	8
- Source: As of 7 Dec 2020

Ashley Gibson (born 25 September 1986) is an English former professional rugby league footballer who played as a centre or winger for the Newcastle Thunder in League One. He has played for both England & England A at international level, with his full England debut was v France in the inaugural Federation Shield on 22 Oct 2006.

He has previously played for the Leeds Rhinos, Salford City Reds, Castleford Tigers and the Wakefield Trinity Wildcats in the Super League.

Following his retirement, Gibson started working as a model and an OnlyFans creator.

== Background ==
Gibson was born in Leeds, West Yorkshire, England.

As a youth he played for Stanningley ARLFC.

=== Leeds Rhinos ===
He is also known to kick goals. He played only 29 times for Leeds over four years, despite scoring a hat-trick in his début, a 74-0 victory over the Leigh Centurions. A combination of limited first team opportunity and injury halting his chances in the first team.

=== Salford City Reds ===
He signed for Salford City Reds at the end of 2009's Super League XIV.

=== Bradford Bulls ===
RFL Championship side Bradford Bulls signed Gibson in June 2017 on a year and a half deal.

2017 - 2017 Season

He featured in Round 20 (Halifax) to Round 21 (Hull Kingston Rovers).

2018 - 2018 Season

Ashley featured in the pre-season friendlies against Halifax, Sheffield Eagles and Toronto Wolfpack.

Gibson featured in Round 1 (York City Knights) to Round 5 (Oldham R.L.F.C.) then in Round 7 (Coventry Bears) to Round 17 (Hunslet R.L.F.C.). He featured in Round 23 (Keighley Cougars) then in Round 25 (Oldham R.L.F.C.) to Final (Workington Town). Gibson also played in the 2018 Challenge Cup in Round 3 (West Wales Raiders) to Round 5 (Warrington Wolves). He scored against York City Knights (1 try), West Wales Raiders (2 tries), Coventry Bears (1 try), London Skolars (1 try), Hunslet R.L.F.C. (2 tries) and Oldham R.L.F.C. (1 try).

At the end of the season Gibson signed a 1 Year extension to his contract.

2019 - 2019 Season

Ashley featured in the pre-season friendlies against York City Knights, Huddersfield Giants and Batley Bulldogs.

Gibson featured in Round 5 (Toulouse Olympique) then in Round 8 (Leigh Centurions). Gibson also played in Round 17 (Leigh Centurions). He also played in the 2019 Challenge Cup in Round 4 (Keighley Cougars). He was released at the end of the season.

Statistics do not include pre-season friendlies.

Season	Appearance	Tries	Goals	F/G	Points
2017 Bradford Bulls	2	0	0	0	0
2018 Bradford Bulls	24	8	0	0	32
2019 Bradford Bulls	4	0	0	0	0
Total	30	8	0	0	32

=== Newcastle Thunder ===
On 25 November 2019 it was reported that he had signed for Newcastle Thunder in the RFL League One

== England ==
He gained national honours with the England A-Team, winning the Federation Shield.
