= Liam Kirk =

English rugby league footballer (born 1997)

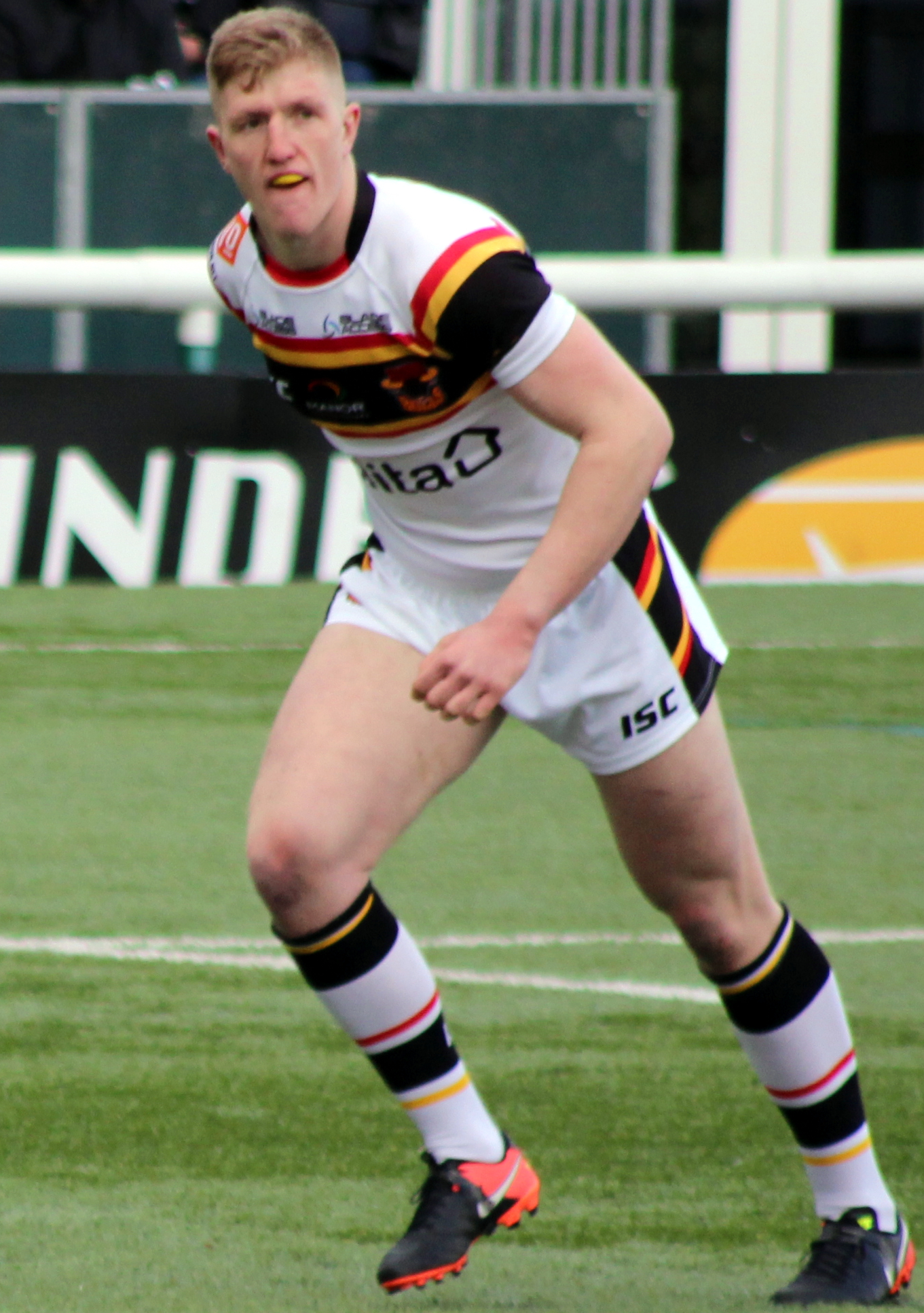

Personal information
- Full name: Robert Kirk
- Born: 26 March 1997 (age 29) Leeds, West Yorkshire, England
- Height: 6 ft 4 in (1.93 m)
- Weight: 16 st 7 lb (105 kg)

Playing information
- Position: Prop, Loose forward
Club
Years	Team	Pld	T	G	FG	P
2016–20	Bradford Bulls	83	5	0	0	20
2021	Oldham RLFC	16	2	0	0	8
2022–23	Sheffield Eagles	39	3	0	0	12
2024–25	Widnes Vikings	28	0	0	0	0
2025	Midlands Hurricanes	8	0	0	0	0
2026–	Batley Bulldogs	11	1	0	0	4
	Total	185	11	0	0	44
- Source: As of 2 May 2026

Liam Kirk (born 26 March 1997) is an English professional rugby league footballer who plays as a prop or loose forward for the Batley Bulldogs in the RFL Championship.

== Background ==
Kirk was born in Leeds, West Yorkshire, England.

Kirk played for Drighligton ARLFC before he joined the Bradford scholarship programme. He is a product of the Bradford Bulls Academy system.

== Playing career ==
=== Bradford Bulls ===
2016 - 2016 Season

Kirk featured in the pre-season friendly against Castleford. He featured in the Championship Shield Round 6 Workington Town to the semi-final against Dewsbury.

2017 - 2017 Season

Kirk featured in the pre-season friendlies against Huddersfield and Keighley.

Kirk featured in Round 1 Hull Kingston Rovers to Round 23 against Swinton then in the Championship Shield Game 1 Toulouse Olympique to Game 7 Rochdale. Kirk also played in the 2017 Challenge Cup in Round 4 Featherstone Rovers. He scored against Hull Kingston Rovers (two tries), Batley (one try) and Rochdale (one try).

At the end of the season Kirk signed a two-year contract extension with the Bradford club.

2018 - 2018 Season

Kirk featured in the pre-season friendlies against Halifax RLFC, Sheffield, Dewsbury, Toronto Wolfpack and Keighley. He scored against Halifax (one try).

He featured in round 1 York then in round 7 against Coventry to round 10 Newcastle Thunder. He played in round 12 North Wales Crusaders to round 16 against the Newcastle Thunder then in round 18 York to round 25 Oldham R.L.F.C. He featured in the semi-final against Oldham and the final against Workington Town. Kirk also played in the 2018 Challenge Cup in round 4 Hunslet R.L.F.C. to round 5 against Warrington.

2019 - 2019 Season

Kirk featured in the pre-season friendlies against York, Dewsbury, Batley and the Toronto Wolfpack.

Kirk played in round 1 Featherstone Rovers to round 17 Leigh then in round 19 Widnes to round 21 Swinton. He also played in round 23 against the Toronto Wolfpack. Kirk also featured in the 2019 Challenge Cup in round 6 against Leeds to the quarter-final against Halifax. He scored against Batley (one try).

2020 - 2020 Season

Kirk featured in the pre-season friendlies against Castleford, Leeds, Dewsbury and York. Kirk played in Round 1 against the London Broncos to Round 3 Featherstone then in round 5 against Sheffield. Kirk featured in the 2020 Challenge Cup in Round 4 against the Underbank Rangers.

=== Oldham ===
At the end of the 2020 season he signed for Championship side Oldham R.L.F.C.

=== Sheffield Eagles ===
In October 2021 Kirk signed for Sheffield Eagles on a two-year deal.

=== Widnes Vikings ===
On 10 October 2023, it was reported that he had signed for Widnes in the RFL Championship on a two-year deal.

=== Midlands Hurricanes ===
On 11 June 2025 it was reported that he had signed for Midlands Hurricanes in the RFL League 1 on a deal until the end of 2026.

=== Batley Bulldogs ===
On 15 November 2025 it was reported that he had signed for Batley Bulldogs in the RFL Championship

=== Statistics ===
Statistics do not include pre-season friendlies.

Season	Appearance	Tries	Goals	F/G	Points
2016 Bradford Bulls	3	0	0	0	0
2017 Bradford Bulls	31	4	0	0	16
2018 Bradford Bulls	22	0	0	0	0
2019 Bradford Bulls	23	1	0	0	4
2020 Bradford Bulls	4	0	0	0	0
Total	83	5	0	0	20
