= Dalton Grant (rugby league) =

Wales international rugby league footballer

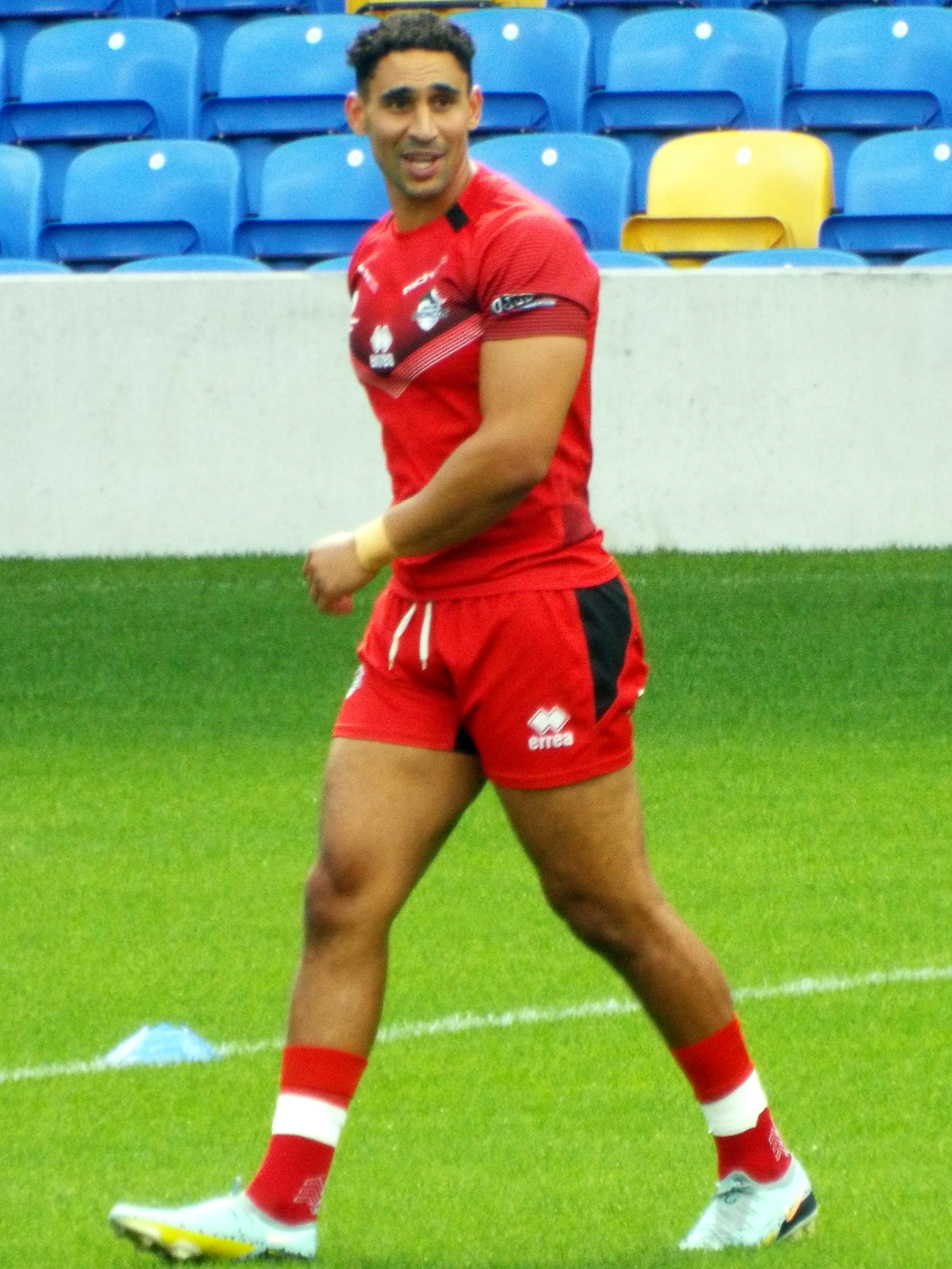

Personal information
- Full name: Dalton Grant
- Born: 21 April 1990 (age 36) Newport, Wales
- Height: 6 ft 0 in (1.83 m)
- Weight: 14 st 0 lb (89 kg)

Playing information
- Position: Wing, Centre
Club
Years	Team	Pld	T	G	FG	P
2011–13	South Wales Scorpions	46	32	0	0	128
2011(loan)	→ Crusaders RL	1	0	0	0	0
2014	Barrow Raiders	28	18	0	0	72
2015–16	Dewsbury Rams	51	32	0	0	128
2017	London Broncos	0	0	0	0	0
2018–19	Bradford Bulls	38	28	0	0	112
2020–21	London Skolars	8	1	0	0	4
2022–23	London Broncos	35	13	0	0	52
	Total	207	124	0	0	496
Representative
Years	Team	Pld	T	G	FG	P
2014–23	Wales	11	5	0	0	20
- Source: As of 14 October 2026

Dalton Grant (born 21 April 1990) is a Welsh professional rugby league footballer who plays as a centre, most recently for the London Broncos in the Betfred Championship and Wales at international level.

He has played at club level for the South Wales Scorpions, the Barrow Raiders and the Dewsbury Rams. He has played for Crusaders RL in the Super League while on loan at the club in 2011.

In September 2014, Grant was named in the Wales squad in preparation for the 2014 European Cup. He went on to play in the tournament, appearing in two games and scoring in the team's game against Ireland.

In October 2015, Grant yet again played for Wales this time in the 2015 version of the European Cup tournament in which Wales become European Champions. Grant scored a try in the opening game against Scotland. He would then go on to score one try for Wales in each of their last two games of the tournament. Giving him a try in ever international game for Wales. Grant also played in the 2017 World Cup for Wales, and also played in the qualifiers to get Wales in the 2021 World Cup. He played in the Sydney World Cup 9's 2019 for Wales.

== Background ==
Grant was born in Newport, Wales.

== Club career ==
=== Bradford Bulls ===
2018 - 2018 Season

In December 2017, Grant signed a one-year deal with Bradford Bulls.

Grant featured in Round 1 York City to Round 7 against the Coventry Bears then in Round 9 West Wales Raiders to Round 22 Workington Town. He also played in Round 24 West Wales Raiders and Round 26 against the Hemel Stags. Grant played in the 2018 Challenge Cup in Round 3 against the West Wales Raiders then in Round 5 against Warrington. At the end of the season Grant signed a one-year extension to his contract.

2019 - 2019 Season

Grant featured in Round 9 Dewsbury to Round 14 Halifax R.L.F.C. then in Round 16 Batley to Round 17 Leigh. Grant played in Round 27 (Rochdale Hornets). Grant played in the 2019 Challenge Cup in Round 4 Keighley to Quarter Final Halifax R.L.F.C.

Statistics do not include pre-season friendlies.

Season	Appearance	Tries	Goals	F/G	Points
2018 Bradford Bulls	25	18	0	0	72
2019 Bradford Bulls	13	11	0	0	44
Total	38	29	0	0	116

=== London Skolars ===
On 16 January 2020, it was announced that Grant had joined London Skolars.

=== London Broncos ===
In 2022, Grant joined RFL Championship side the London Broncos. On 15 October 2023, Grant played in the London Broncos upset Million Pound Game victory over Toulouse Olympique.

== International career ==
He was selected in the Wales 9s squad for the 2019 Rugby League World Cup 9s.
