= Callum Bustin =

English rugby league and rugby union footballer

Cal Bustin
Personal information
- Full name: Callum Bustin
- Born: 12 August 1997 (age 28) London, England
- Height: 6 ft 2 in (1.88 m)
- Weight: 18 st 4 lb (116 kg)

Playing information

Rugby league
- Position: Second-row, Centre, Prop
Club
Years	Team	Pld	T	G	FG	P
2016–17	London Broncos	2	0	0	0	0
2016(loan)	→ Oxford	5	0	0	0	0
2017(loan)	→ London Skolars	12	1	0	0	4
2017(loan)	→ Oxford	1	2	0	0	8
2017–18	Castleford Tigers	0	0	0	0	0
2017(loan)	→ Newcastle Thunder	11	0	0	0	0
2018(loan)	→ Bradford Bulls	15	4	0	0	16
2018–19	Bradford Bulls	15	3	0	0	12
2021	Barrow Raiders	16	4	0	0	16
	Total	77	14	0	0	56

Rugby union
Club
Years	Team	Pld	T	G	FG	P
2019–20	Yorkshire Carnegie	6	2	0	0	10
2021–	Rotherham Titans	2	3	0	0	15
	Total	8	5	0	0	25
- Source: As of 4 July 2026

Callum Bustin (born 12 August 1997) is an English professional rugby league and rugby union footballer who plays for Rotherham Titans in the National League 2 North.

Bustin previously played rugby league as a prop for the London Broncos in the RFL Championship, and spent time on loan from the Broncos at Oxford and the London Skolars. He was contracted to the Castleford Tigers in the Super League and spent time on loan from Castleford at the Newcastle Thunder and the Bradford Bulls in League 1. He then joined the Bradford Bulls on a permanent deal and played in the third tier and in the Betfred Championship.

== Background ==
Bustin was born in London, England.

== Early career ==
Callum came through the academy at London Broncos. During the 2016 League 1 season Bustin was loaned out to Oxford Rugby League. He featured against North Wales Crusaders, Rochdale Hornets, Doncaster R.L.F.C., Hemel Stags and Gloucestershire All Golds.

Bustin made his debut for the Broncos in a 2016 RFL Championship match against Halifax R.L.F.C.

During the 2017 season, Callum was loaned to League 1 side London Skolars before being recalled by the Broncos to play in the Championship against Dewsbury Rams. Bustin was then loaned back to Oxford where he scored his first professional try by scoring a brace against Hemel Stags. After a 12-game stint at the London Skolars, Callum signed a pay as you play deal with Newcastle Thunder whilst he was training for Super League side Castleford Tigers.

Following the 2017 season Castleford Tigers announced the signing of Bustin on trial. However he was loaned to League 1 side Bradford Bulls for the 2018 season.

=== Bradford Bulls ===
2018 - 2018 Season

Callum played in the pre-season game against Keighley Cougars.

Bustin featured in Round 3 (Keighley Cougars) to Round 11 (Hemel Stags) then in Round 14 (Doncaster R.L.F.C.) to Round 18 (York City Knights). He also played in Round 24 (West Wales Raiders) to Round 26 (Hemel Stags). Bustin also featured in the 2018 Challenge Cup in Round 3 (West Wales Raiders) and Round 5 (Warrington Wolves).

At the end of the season Bustin signed a permanent 1 Year Deal with the Bulls.

2019 - 2019 Season

Callum played in the pre-season friendly against York City Knights and also in the RFL Yorkshire Cup against Halifax R.L.F.C. and Dewsbury Rams.

He featured in Round 5 (Toulouse Olympique) to Round 7 (Widnes Vikings) then in Round 9 (Dewsbury Rams) to Round 10 (Halifax R.L.F.C.). Callum then featured in Round 16 (Batley Bulldogs) then again in Round 19 (Widnes Vikings) to Round 20 (Toulouse Olympique). Bustin also played in the 2019 Challenge Cup in Round 4 (Keighley Cougars) to Round 5 (Featherstone Rovers).

=== Barrow Raiders ===
On 1 Feb 2021 it was reported that he had signed for Barrow Raiders in the RFL League 1.

== Statistics ==
Statistics do not include pre-season friendlies.

Season	Appearance	Tries	Goals	F/G	Points
2018 Bradford Bulls	20	7	0	0	28
2019 Bradford Bulls	10	0	0	0	0
Total	30	7	0	0	28
