= Reiss Butterworth =

English rugby league footballer

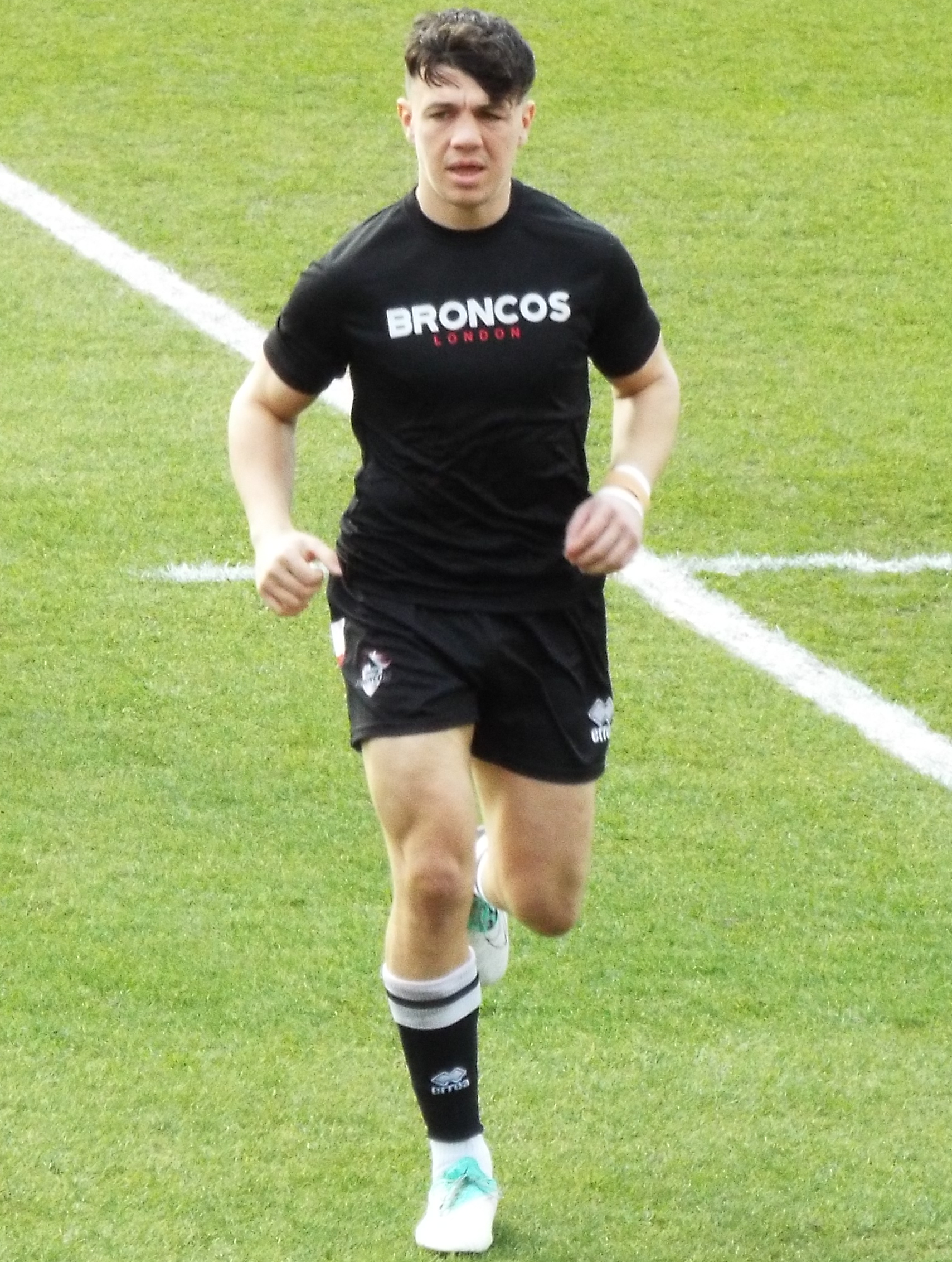

Personal information
- Full name: Reiss Butterworth
- Born: 7 December 1998 (age 27) Sharlston, West Yorkshire, England
- Height: 5 ft 11 in (1.80 m)
- Weight: 14 st 1 lb (89 kg)

Playing information
- Position: Hooker
Club
Years	Team	Pld	T	G	FG	P
2017–18	Bradford Bulls	4	0	0	0	0
2018(Loan)	→ Batley Bulldogs	4	2	0	0	8
2019–20	Huddersfield Giants	2	0	0	0	0
2019(Loan)	→ Workington Town	2	0	0	0	0
2019(Loan)	→ Batley Bulldogs	14	0	0	0	0
2020(Loan)	→ York City Knights	2	1	0	0	4
2021–23	Dewsbury Rams	62	8	0	0	32
2024	Hull Kingston Rovers	0	0	0	0	0
2024(loan)	→ London Broncos	3	0	0	0	0
2024(loan)	→ Featherstone Rovers	2	0	0	0	0
2024(loan)	→ Dewsbury Rams	15	2	0	0	8
2025–26	Sheffield Eagles	24	2	0	0	8
2026(loan)	→ Rochdale Hornets	1	0	0	0	0
2027–	Oldham RLFC	0	0	0	0	0
	Total	135	15	0	0	60
- Source: As of 6 October 2026

Reiss Butterworth (born 7 December 1998) is an English professional rugby league player who plays as a hooker for Oldham RLFC in the RFL Championship.

He is a product of the Bradford Bulls Academy system and played for the Bradford Bulls in Betfred Championship.

== Background ==
Butterworth was born in Sharlston, West Yorkshire, England.

== Playing career ==
=== Bradford Bulls ===
2017 - 2017 Season Butterworth featured in 2017 pre-season friendlies against Huddersfield Giants and Keighley Cougars. He then featured in Round 20 and Round 21. Butterwoth also featured in the Championship Shield Game 5 against the Sheffield Eagles. Riess also played in the 2017 Challenge Cup in Round 4.

At the end of the season Butterworth signed a three-year contract extension with the Bulls.

2018 - 2018 Season

Butterworth featured in the pre-season friendlies against Halifax R.L.F.C., Sheffield Eagles and Dewsbury Rams.

He was sent on loan to Batley Bulldogs for a month. Following his loan spell he was sent on loan to Castleford Tigers until the end of the season as part of a swap/loan deal for James Green.

=== Huddersfield ===
The young hooker spent most of his time out on loan with Batley Bulldogs, Castleford Tigers and, most recently, York City Knights for whom he scored against Rochdale Hornets in the 2020 Coral Challenge Cup.

=== Dewsbury Rams ===
On 28 November 2020, it was announced that Butterworth had signed for Dewsbury Rams

=== Hull KR ===
On 17 October 2023, it was reported that he had signed for Hull Kingston Rovers on a one-year deal (with an option to extend for a further 12 months).

=== London Broncos (loan) ===
On 7 Mar 2024 it was reported that he had signed for the London Broncos in the Super League on short-term 2-week loan.

=== Dewsbury Rams (loan) ===
On 22 May 2024 it was reported that he had signed for Dewsbury Rams in the RFL Championship on short-term loan

=== Sheffield Eagles ===
On 10 Nov 2024 it was reported that he had signed for Sheffield Eagles in the RFL Championship

=== Rochdale Hornets (loan) ===
On 27 February 2026 it was reported that he had signed for Rochdale Hornets in the RFL Championship on 1-week loan

=== Oldham RLFC ===
On 29 September 2026 it was reported that he had signed for Oldham RLFC in the RFL Championship on a 2-year deal.

== Statistics ==
Statistics do not include pre-season friendlies.

Season	Appearance	Tries	Goals	F/G	Points
2017 Bradford Bulls	4	0	0	0	0
2018 Bradford Bulls	0	0	0	0	0
Total	4	0	0	0	0
