= Tuoyo Egodo =

Nigeria dual-code international rugby player

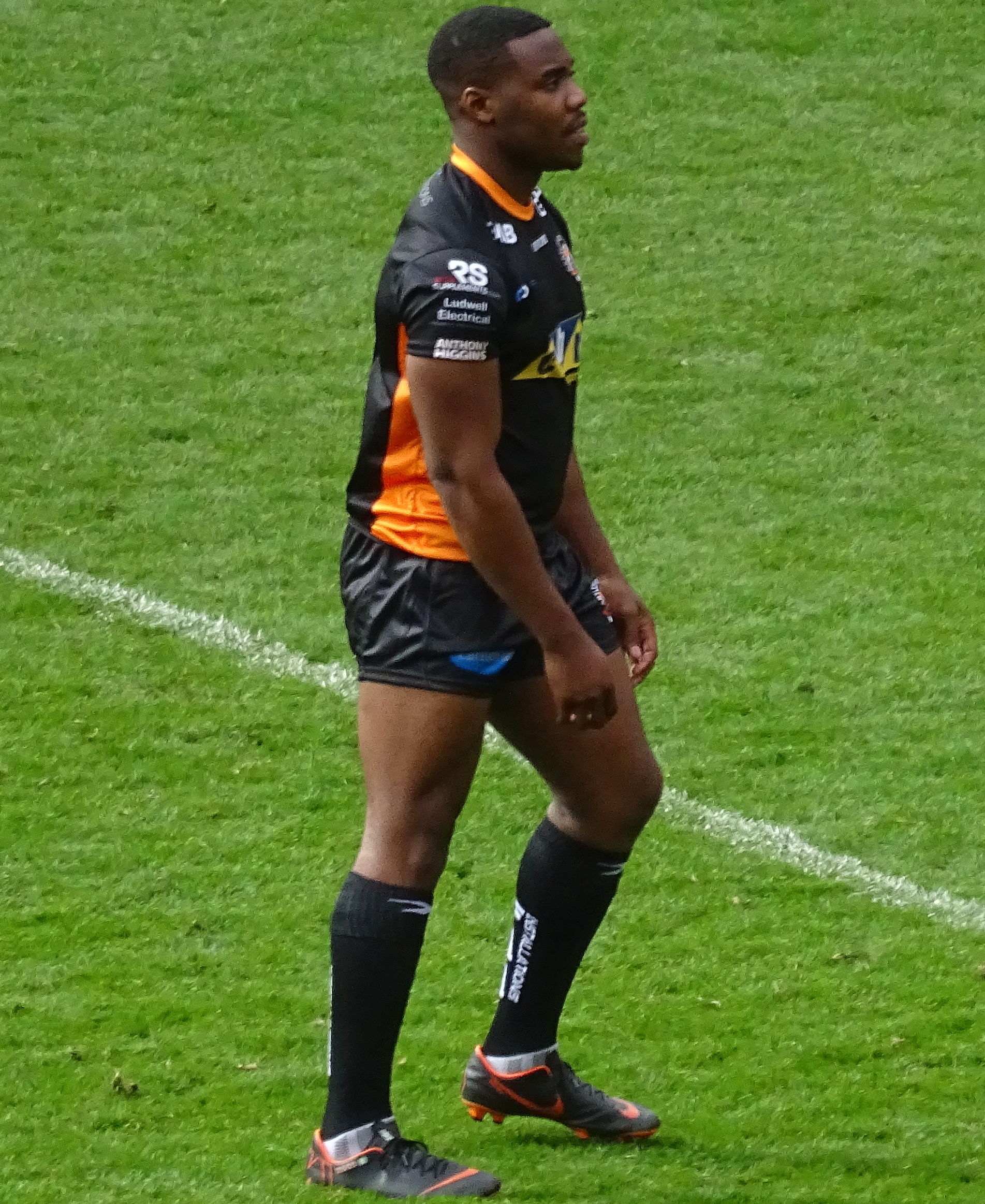

Personal information
- Full name: Tuoyo Anthony Egodo
- Born: 16 February 1997 (age 29) Tottenham, London, England
- Height: 5 ft 10 in (1.78 m)
- Weight: 15 st 2 lb (96 kg)

Playing information

Rugby league
- Position: Wing, Centre, Second-row
Club
Years	Team	Pld	T	G	FG	P
2016	London Broncos	0	0	0	0	0
2016(loan)	→ Hemel Stags	9	1	0	0	4
2017–19	Castleford Tigers	16	11	0	0	44
2017(loan)	→ Oldham	10	2	0	0	8
2017(loan)	→ York City Knights	2	0	0	0	0
2018(loan)	→ Newcastle Thunder	7	6	0	0	24
2018(loan)	→ Bradford Bulls	8	5	0	0	20
2020–21	London Broncos	15	10	0	0	40
	Total	67	35	0	0	140
Representative
Years	Team	Pld	T	G	FG	P
2022	Nigeria	2	1	0	0	4

Rugby union
- Position: Wing, Centre
Club
Years	Team	Pld	T	G	FG	P
2022–	Moseley RFC	35	5	0	0	25
Representative
Years	Team	Pld	T	G	FG	P
2024–2025	Nigeria	1	0	0	0	0
- Source: As of 18 September 2022

Tuoyo Anthony Egodo (born 16 February 1997) is a rugby footballer who plays rugby union for Moseley RFC and Nigeria. He previously played rugby league as a winger or centre for the London Broncos and Castleford Tigers, and for Nigeria at international level. Egodo also had loan spells at Hemel Stags, Oldham, York City Knights, Newcastle Thunder and the Bradford Bulls.

== Background ==
Egodo was born in London, England, and is of Nigerian descent.

== London Broncos ==
Egodo has come through the Academy system at the London Broncos.

He spent time on loan away from the capital in RFL League 1 with the Hemel Stags in 2016.

== Castleford Tigers ==
A 2017 move to the Castleford Tigers saw him stepping up to the Super League. He scored a hat-trick on his Super League debut against Hull FC in September 2017.

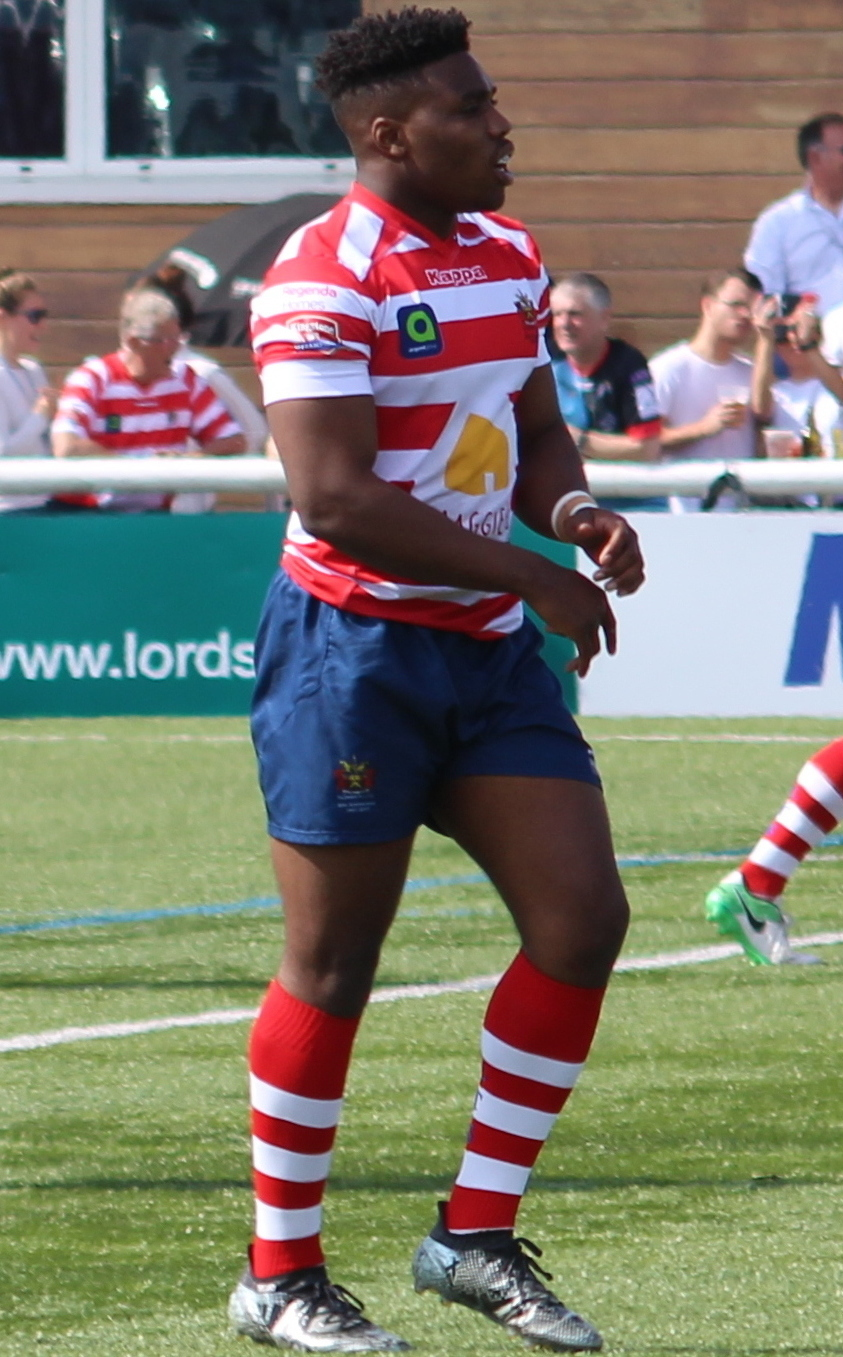
Egodo playing for Oldham in 2017

In 2017 Egodo was loaned from Castleford to Oldham and the York City Knights.

In 2018 the Tigers sent him on loan to the Newcastle Thunder and the Bradford Bulls.

== Return to the Broncos ==
Egodo returned to the capital ahead of the 2020 Championship season. He was the top try scorer for the Broncos in the 2020 that was curtailed due to a global pandemic.

== Switch to Rugby Union ==
Egodo was announced as having signed for Birmingham Moseley Rugby Club on 13 January 2022. On 9 June 2026, it was announced that Tuoyo had left Birmingham Moseley.

Egodo made his debut for Nigeria on 18 December 2024 against Tunisia in the Rugby Africa Cup, having been named in the squad for Nigeria's first 15-a-side fixture since 2019.

== Club statistics ==
Year	Club	Competition	Appearances	Tries	Goals	Drop goals	Points
2016	London Broncos	Championship	0	0	0	0	0
2016	Hemel Stags	League 1	9	1	0	0	4
2017	Castleford Tigers	Super League	1	3	0	0	12
2017	Oldham	Championship	10	2	0	0	8
2017	York City Knights	League 1	2	0	0	0	0
2018	Castleford Tigers	Super League	2	0	0	0	0
2018	Newcastle Thunder	League 1	7	6	0	0	24
2018	Bradford Bulls	League 1	8	5	0	0	20
2019	Castleford Tigers	Super League	13	8	0	0	32
2020	London Broncos	Championship	6	4	0	0	16
2021	London Broncos	Championship	4	5	0	0	20
Club career total			62	34	0	0	136
