= Gregg McNally =

Ireland international rugby league player

Personal information
- Full name: Gregg Joseph McNally
- Born: 2 January 1991 (age 34) Whitehaven, Cumbria, England

Playing information
- Height: 5 ft 10 in (1.78 m)
- Weight: 13 st 5 lb (85 kg)
- Position: Fullback, Stand-off, Scrum-half
Club
Years	Team	Pld	T	G	FG	P
2008	Whitehaven RLFC	33	28	8	0	128
2009–11	Huddersfield Giants	1	0	6	0	12
2009(loan)	→ Whitehaven RLFC	18	5	73	0	166
2010(DR)	→ Oldham RLFC	12	7	46	1	121
2010(loan)	→ Whitehaven RLFC	3	0	2	0	4
2011(loan)	→ Barrow Raiders	8	3	5	0	22
2012–17	Leigh Centurions	147	94	20	0	416
2018–19	Bradford Bulls	13	5	0	0	20
2019–20	Leigh Centurions	29	17	1	0	70
2021	Whitehaven RLFC	14	3	0	3	15
2022	Rochdale Hornets	21	20	2	0	84
2023	Oldham RLFC	15	7	0	0	28
2024–25	Rochdale Hornets	20	9	0	0	36
	Total	334	198	163	4	1122
Representative
Years	Team	Pld	T	G	FG	P
2010–25	Ireland	14	6	9	0	42
2022	Cumbria	1	0	0	0	0

Gregg McNally (born 2 January 1991) is a former Ireland international rugby league footballer who played as a fullback for Rochdale Hornets in the RFL League 1. He has played at representative level for England (Academy, 2008 tour of Australia) he started his career at Kells, and at club level for Whitehaven (three spells, including the second during 2009, and the third during 2010 on loan from Huddersfield Giants), Huddersfield Giants, Oldham (dual registration), Barrow Raiders (loan), Leigh Centurions, (two spells), Whitehaven RLFC and in the Betfred Championship for Bradford Bulls, as a goal-kicking fullback, stand-off or scrum-half.

== Background ==
McNally was born in Whitehaven, Cumbria, England, he has Irish ancestors, and eligible to play for Ireland due to the grandparent rule.

== Career ==
=== Huddersfield Giants ===
McNally was transferred from Whitehaven to the Huddersfield Giants during November 2008, after which he made his début in a friendly match against Halifax on Sunday 4 January 2009 and then returned to Whitehaven on loan for a season.

At youth level McNally scored 18 points to take Whitehaven School to the 2006–2007 national Champion Schools final, going on to take his team to victory in the final with three tries, qualifying for European competition.

=== Leigh Centurions ===
McNally joined Leigh Centurions in time for the 2012 season. At the Leigh Centurions McNally won 1 Northern Rail Cup, 3 League Leaders' Shield, and 1 Kingstone Press Championship Grand Final.

=== Bradford Bulls ===
In January 2018 NcNally joined Bradford on a two-year deal. He was released by the Bulls in January 2019 on compassionate grounds.

=== Whitehaven ===
On 4 December 2020 it was reported that McNally would return to Whitehaven for the 2021 season.

=== Rochdale Hornets ===
On 22 October 2021 it was reported that he had signed for Rochdale in the RFL League 1.

=== Rochdale Hornets (re-join) ===
On 12 November 2023 it was reported that he had re-signed for Rochdale in the RFL League 1.

== International honours ==
In 2010 he represented Ireland at the Alitalia European Cup. Despite Ireland coming fourth of four McNally was the top points scorer of the competition.

He also represented Ireland in the 2011 Autumn International Series, and the 2012 European Cup.

In 2016 he was called up to the Ireland squad for the 2017 Rugby League World Cup European Pool B qualifiers.
