= Jake Butler-Fleming =

Australian rugby league footballer

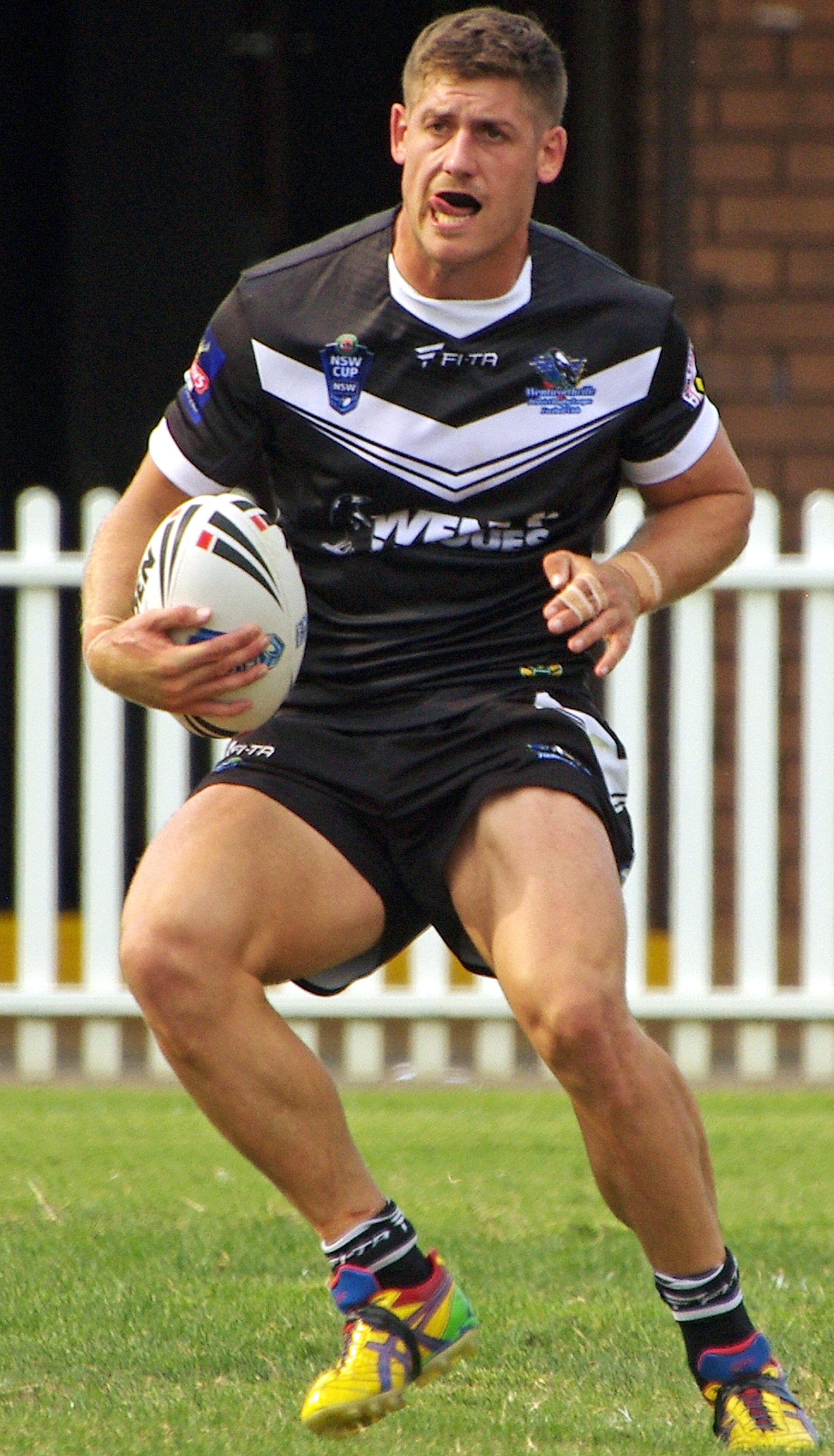

Personal information
- Born: 8 January 1992 (age 33); Penrith, New South Wales, Australia
- Height: 6 ft 0 in (1.83 m)
- Weight: 14 st 10 lb (93 kg)

Playing information
- Position: Centre, Wing
Club
| Years | Team | Pld | T | G | FG | P |
|---|---|---|---|---|---|---|
| 2017 | Hull Kingston Rovers | 9 | 5 | 0 | 0 | 20 |
| 2017(loan) | → York City Knights | 5 | 2 | 0 | 0 | 8 |
| 2018 | York City Knights | 0 | 0 | 0 | 0 | 0 |
| 2018(loan) | → Hull Kingston Rovers | 0 | 0 | 0 | 0 | 0 |
| 2018– | Toronto Wolfpack | 1 | 2 | 0 | 0 | 8 |
| 2018(loan) | → Bradford Bulls | 2 | 1 | 0 | 0 | 4 |
| 2018 | → York City Knights (loan) | 6 | 0 | 0 | 0 | 0 |
| | Total | 23 | 10 | 0 | 0 | 40 |
- Source: As of 6 October 2018

Jake Butler-Fleming (born 8 January 1992) is an Australian rugby league footballer.

A Penrith Panthers junior, Butler-Fleming played for the Wentworthville Magpies before being signed by Hull Kingston Rovers in the Super League in late 2016.

In December 2017, he signed a one-year with York for 2018 having played for them on loan during the 2017 season, he eventually earned a full-time contract with the Toronto Wolfpack.
