= Liam Johnson =

English rugby league footballer (born 1997)

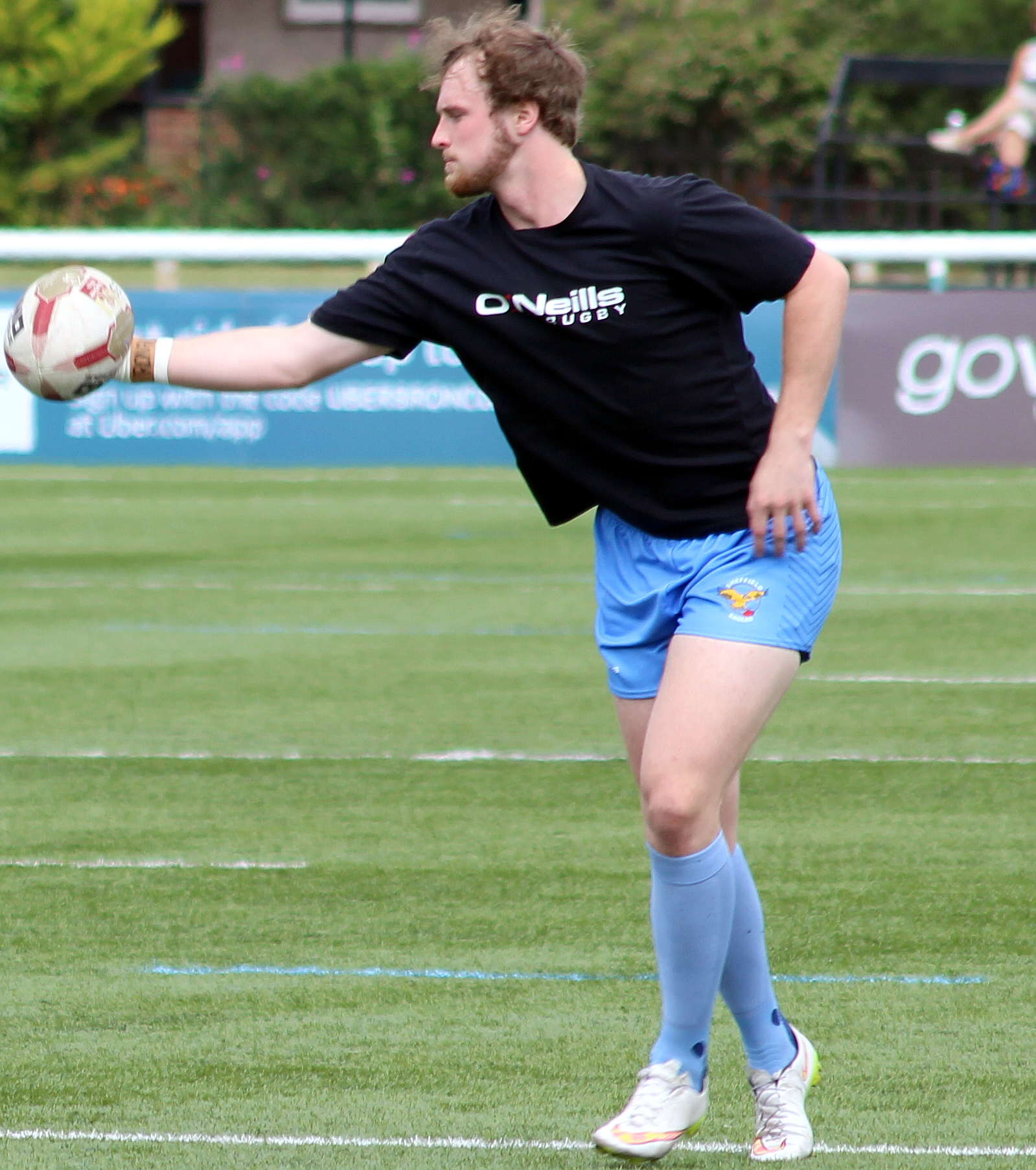

Personal information
- Born: 12 May 1997 (age 28) Huddersfield, West Yorkshire, England
- Height: 6 ft 2.2 in (1.885 m)
- Weight: 15 st 10 lb (100 kg)

Playing information
- Position: Second-row, Loose forward, Centre
Club
Years	Team	Pld	T	G	FG	P
2016–18	Huddersfield Giants	1	0	0	0	0
2016(loan)	→ Oldham	14	4	0	0	16
2017(loan)	→ Sheffield Eagles	20	1	0	0	4
2018(loan)	→ Bradford Bulls	14	6	0	0	24
2019–20	Dewsbury Rams	9	1	0	0	4
2021	Doncaster	18	10	0	0	40
2022	Sheffield Eagles	9	3	0	0	12
	Total	85	25	0	0	100
- Source: As of 18 January 2023

Liam Johnson (born 12 May 1997) is an English former professional rugby league footballer who last played as a second-row, loose forward or centre for the Sheffield Eagles in RFL Championship.

== Background ==
Johnson was born in Huddersfield, West Yorkshire, England.

== Career ==
Johnson has had previous loan spells with the Sheffield Eagles and Oldham in the Kingstone Press Championship.

In November 2017 he signed a one-year loan deal with the Bradford Bulls.

In November 2018 he signed for the Dewsbury Rams.

On 16 Oct 2020 he signed for Doncaster in RFL League 1.

In November 2021 he signed a two-year deal with Sheffield Eagles.
