= Mikey Wood =

English rugby league footballer

Personal information
- Full name: Michael Wood
- Born: 18 April 1996 (age 29) Huddersfield, West Yorkshire, England
- Height: 6 ft 3 in (1.90 m)
- Weight: 15 st 6 lb (98 kg)

Playing information
- Position: Second-row
Club
| Years | Team | Pld | T | G | FG | P |
|---|---|---|---|---|---|---|
| 2016–18 | Huddersfield Giants | 2 | 0 | 0 | 0 | 0 |
| 2015(loan) | → Halifax | 2 | 0 | 0 | 0 | 0 |
| 2016(loan) | → Newcastle Thunder | 12 | 2 | 0 | 0 | 8 |
| 2017(loan) | → Oldham RLFC | 9 | 0 | 0 | 0 | 0 |
| 2018(loan) | → Bradford Bulls | 28 | 1 | 0 | 0 | 4 |
| 2019 | Bradford Bulls | 24 | 1 | 0 | 0 | 4 |
| 2020–21 | Newcastle Thunder | 13 | 1 | 0 | 0 | 4 |
| 2021 | Hunslet RLFC | 14 | 3 | 0 | 0 | 12 |
| 2022–23 | Sheffield Eagles | 49 | 5 | 0 | 0 | 20 |
| 2023(loan) | → Midlands Hurricanes | 1 | 0 | 0 | 0 | 0 |
| 2024 | Swinton Lions | 26 | 1 | 0 | 0 | 4 |
| 2024(loan) | → Sheffield Eagles | 3 | 0 | 0 | 0 | 0 |
| 2025– | Midlands Hurricanes | 20 | 1 | 0 | 0 | 4 |
| | Total | 203 | 15 | 0 | 0 | 60 |
- Source: As of 23 September 2025

Mikey Wood (born 18 April 1996) is a professional rugby league footballer who plays as a second-row for the Midlands Hurricanes in the RFL League 1.

== Playing career ==
=== Huddersfield Giants ===
He previously played for the Huddersfield Giants in the Super League after progressing through the Giants' Academy system. Wood played on-loan for Halifax and Oldham. In October 2017 he joined the Bradford Bulls on a season-long loan from Huddersfield before signing permanently the following season. Wood joined Sheffield Eagles on a two-yeal deal in October 2021.

=== Swinton Lions ===
On 24 Oct 2023 it was reported that he had signed for Swinton Lions in the RFL League 1 on a 2-year deal.

=== Midlands Hurricanes ===
On 18 Oct 2024 it was reported that he had signed for Midlands Hurricanes in the RFL League 1 on a 2-year deal.
