= 2018 Challenge Cup =

Rugby league competition

2018 Ladbrokes Challenge Cup
- Duration: 9 Rounds
- Number of teams: 85
- Highest attendance: 50,672; Catalans Dragons v Warrington Wolves (Final, 25 August)
- Lowest attendance: 115; Hemel Stags v Newcastle Thunder (25 February)
- Aggregate attendance: 162,075
- Broadcast partners: BBC Sport; Sky Sports
- Winners: Catalans Dragons
- Runners-up: Warrington Wolves
- Biggest home win: Widnes Vikings 90–0 Coventry Bears (21 April)
- Biggest away win: Hemel Stags 0–74 Newcastle Thunder (25 February)
- Lance Todd Trophy: Tony Gigot
- Top point-scorer(s): Josh Drinkwater (50)
- Top try-scorer(s): Josh Charnley (9)

The 2018 Challenge Cup, also known as the Ladbrokes Challenge Cup for sponsorship reasons, was the 117th staging of the Challenge Cup, the main rugby league knockout tournament for teams in the Super League, the British National Leagues and a number of invited amateur clubs.

The cup was won by Catalans Dragons, who beat Warrington Wolves 20–14 at Wembley on 25 August 2018 to become the first non-British team to win the challenge cup in its 117-year history. The defending champions, Hull F.C., went out at the quarter-final stage.

The Catalans fullback, Tony Gigot, was voted the winner of the Lance Todd Trophy, becoming the first Frenchman to win the trophy since it was first awarded in 1946.

The format of the competition was eight knock-out rounds followed by a final. The first two rounds were composed entirely of 48 amateur teams. The 12 winners of the second round ties were joined in round three by the 14 League 1 teams. For the fourth round, the 13 winners from round 3 were joined by 11 of the 12 Championship teams (Toulouse Olympique. who play in the Championship, chose not to enter the 2018 cup competition). Round five saw four Super League teams entering the competition, namely those that finished in the top four positions of the 2017 Qualifiers—Warrington Wolves, Widnes Vikings, Hull Kingston Rovers and Catalans Dragons. The remaining eight Super League teams joined in round six.

== Round details ==
Round	Date	Clubs involved this round	Winners from previous round	New entries this round	Leagues entering at this round
Round 1	27–28 January	48	n/a	48	39 English amateur clubs Scottish, Welsh & Irish champions 3 Armed Forces teams British Police; 2 University rugby league representatives
Round 2	10–11 February	24	24	0	n/a
Round 3	24–25 February	26	12	14	League 1
Round 4	17–18 March	24	13	11*	Championship
Round 5	21–22 April	16	12	4	2017 Super League Qualifiers top 4
Round 6	12–13 May	16	8	8	2017 Super League top 8
Quarter-finals	2–3 June	8	8	n/a	n/a
Semi-finals	5 August	4	4	n/a	n/a
Final	25 August	2	2	n/a	n/a

*Toulouse Olympique did not participate in the competition.

== First round ==
The draw for the first round was made on 12 December 2017 at Media City and streamed live on the BBC Sport website. The draw was made by recently retired Hull F.C. captain, Gareth Ellis, and former Lance Todd Trophy winner, Paul Wellens. The 48 teams in the draw comprised 39 English amateur teams, the winners of the Scottish, Welsh and Irish leagues, two teams from the Universities rugby league and representative teams for the three armed services and the police.

Ties were played over the weekend of 27–28 January 2018 with the exception of one game postponed to the following weekend.

Home	Score	Away	Match Information
Home	Score	Away	Date and Time	Venue	Referee	Attendance (Note: Attendances for the first round are not reported.)
Leigh Miners Rangers	18–22	Myton Warriors	27 January 2018, 2:30pm	Twist Lane
Underbank Rangers	16–17 (Note: after golden point extra time)	Batley Boys	27 January 2018, 2:00pm	The Cross Grounds
Kells	40–8	British Police	27 January 2018, 2:00pm	Old Arrowthwaite	D. Arnold
Wallsend Eagles	6–42	Pilkington Recs	27 January 2018, 2:30pm	Benfield Sports Centre
Rochdale Mayfield	28–0	Crosfields	27 January 2018, 2:30pm	Mayfield Sports Centre	L. Staveley
Lock Lane	48–0	Hindley	27 January 2018, 2:00pm	Hicksons Arena	J. Barr
Hunslet Club Parkside	walkover (Note: Tie was scratched and awarded to Hunslet Club Parkside as Valley Cougars were unable to raise a team for the scheduled date and scheduling issues made re-arranging the fixture impossible)	Valley Cougars	27 January 2018, 2:00pm	Hillidge Road
London Chargers	18–0	Hammersmith Hills Hoists	27 January 2018, 1:00pm	New River Stadium	T. Jones
Royal Air Force	12–4	Drighlington	27 January 2018, 1:30pm	RAF Cranwell	N.Woodward
Oulton Raiders	28–26	Siddal	27 January 2018, 2:00pm	Oulton & Woodlesford Sports club
Millom	36–18	Strathmore Silverbacks	27 January 2018, 1:30pm	Coronation Field	D. Bowmer
Loughborough University	4–38	Bradford Dudley Hill	27 January 2018, 12:00pm	Rugby Rubbercrumb	S.Ellis
University of Hull	24–10	Hensingham RLFC	27 January 2018, 2:30pm	Hull Uni Sports & Fitness Centre	M. Smaill
Orrell St James	34–0	Northampton Demons	27 January 2018, 2:30pm	Bankes Avenue
Royal Navy	11–12 (Note: after golden point extra time)	Normanton Knights	27 January 2018, 2:00pm	US Sports Ground
York Acorn	16–32	Askam RLFC	27 January 2018, 2:00pm	Thanet Road
Saddleworth Rangers	12–22	Thatto Heath Crusaders	27 January 2018, 2:00pm	Shaw Hall Bank Road
Shaw Cross Sharks	18–0	Beverley	3 February 2018, 2:00pm (Note: Match postponed from 27 January due to waterlogged pitch.)	Bywell Field	C. Astbury
West Hull	58–10	Longhorns ARLFC	28 January 2018, 2:00pm	Community Park
East Leeds	10–28	Thornhill Trojans	27 January 2018, 2:30pm	East End Park	J. Stearne
Hunslet Warriors	0–30	Wath Brow Hornets	27 January 2018, 2:00pm	The Oval	H. Neville
Featherstone Lions	34–14	Skirlaugh	27 January 2018, 2:00pm	The Millpond
British Army	48–10	Milford Marlins	27 January 2018, 3:00pm	Aldershot Rugby Stadium	C. Worsely
Distington ARLFC	32–24	Queens ARLFC	27 January 2018, 2:00pm	Grass Road

== Second round ==
The draw for the second round was made on 31 January 2018 at Warrington's Halliwell Jones Stadium and streamed live on the BBC Sport website. The draw was made by Warrington Wolves former prop forward and Swinton Lions coach, Gary Chambers, and current Warrington forward Sitaleki Akauola. The 24 teams in the draw comprised the winners from the first round.

Ties were played on 10 February 2018. Batley Boys won their tie with a drop goal in golden point extra time, having won their first round tie in the same fashion.

Home	Score	Away	Match Information
Home	Score	Away	Date and Time	Venue	Referee	Attendance (Note: Attendances for the second round are not reported.)
British Army	26–14	London Chargers	10 February 2018, 1:00pm	Aldershot Military Stadium	K. Moore
Millom	24–12	Bradford Dudley Hill	10 February 2018, 1:30pm	Coronation Field	N.Woodward
Kells	16–4	Orrell St James	10 February 2018, 2:00pm	Old Arrowthwaite	L. Rush
Batley Boys	13–12 (Note: after golden point extra time)	Royal Air Force	10 February 2018, 2:00pm	Halifax Road	J. Stearne
Oulton Raiders	24–10	Shaw Cross Sharks	10 February 2018, 2:00pm	Oulton Community Sports Club	G.Houston
Distington	12–4	Lock Lane	10 February 2018, 2:00pm	Distington Community Sports Club	M. Smaill
Hunslet Club Parkside	24–6	Wath Brow Hornets	10 February 2018, 2:00pm	Hillidge Road	P. Marklove
Pilkington Recs	16–0	Thornhill Trojans	10 February 2018, 2:00pm	Ruskin Drive	J. Jones
Featherstone Lions	18–6	Thatto Heath Crusaders	10 February 2018, 2:00pm	The Mill Pond Stadium	M. Rossleigh
Askam	16–4	West Hull	10 February 2018, 2:00pm	Sandy Lane	J. Barr
Rochdale Mayfield	4–8	Normanton Knights	10 February 2018, 2:30pm	Mayfield Sports Arena	C. Smith
University of Hull	18–22	Myton Warriors	10 February 2018, 2:30pm	University of Hull	C. Worsley

== Third round ==
The draw for the third round was made on 13 February live on the BBC Sport website. The draw was made by Super League players Alex Walmsley and Kriss Brining. Ties were played over the weekend of 24–25 February.

Home	Score	Away	Match Information
Home	Score	Away	Date and Time	Venue	Referee	Attendance
Kells	30–4	British Army	24 February 2018, 2:00pm	Old Arrowthwaite	C. Smith	300
Normanton Knights	18–0	Batley Boys	24 February 2018, 2:00pm	Queen Elizabeth Drive	M. Smaill	350
Askam	6–64	York City Knights	24 February 2018, 2:30pm	Fallowfield Park	B. Milligan	750
Hunslet Club Parkside	16–24	Workington Town	24 February 2018, 2:30pm	John Charles Stadium	T. Crashley	285
Pilkington Recs	32–16	Millom	24 February 2018, 2:30pm	Ruskin Drive	J. Stearne	285
Hemel Stags	0–74	Newcastle Thunder	25 February 2018, 2:00pm	Pennine Way stadium	A.Sweet	115
North Wales Crusaders	28–24	Keighley Cougars	25 February 2018, 2:30pm	Racecourse Ground	J.Jones	281
Bradford Bulls	82–6	West Wales Raiders	25 February 2018, 3:00pm	Odsal Stadium	N.Woodward	1,505
Coventry Bears	42–12	Distington	25 February 2018, 3:00pm	Butts Park Arena	C. Worsley	267
Doncaster	82–6	Myton Warriors	25 February 2018, 3:00pm	Keepmoat Stadium	M.Mannifield	388
Hunslet	72–16	Oulton Raiders	25 February 2018, 3:00pm	South Leeds Stadium	B. Pearson	896
Oldham	42–0	Featherstone Lions	25 February 2018, 3:00pm	Vestacare Stadium	L. Staveley	364
Whitehaven	16-14	London Skolars	25 February 2018, 6:00pm	Recreation Ground	M. Griffiths	439

== Fourth round ==
The draw was conducted by former player (and Challenge Cup winner) Rob Parker and former Scottish international Andrew Henderson.

Home	Score	Away	Match Information
Home	Score	Away	Date and Time	Venue	Referee	Attendance
Kells	6–56	Toronto Wolfpack	16 March 2018, 6:15pm	Recreation Ground (Note: Match played at Whitehaven's Recreation Ground)	N. Bennett	1,000
Doncaster	34–0	Newcastle Thunder	16 March 2018, 8:00pm	Keepmoat Stadium	L. Staveley	398
Normanton Knights	8–20	Rochdale Hornets	17 March 2018, 2:00pm	L.D. Nutrition Stadium (Note: Played at Featherstone Rovers' ground)	G. Dolan	Not recorded
Barrow Raiders	28–16	Sheffield Eagles	18 March 2018, 3:00pm	Craven Park	B. Robinson	936
Batley Bulldogs	4–8	Leigh Centurions	18 March 2018, 3:00pm	Fox's Biscuits Stadium	T. Grant	606
Whitehaven	25–18	Dewsbury Rams	18 March 2018, 3:00pm	Recreation Ground	A. Sweet	414
Workington Town	20–22	London Broncos	18 March 2018, 3:00pm	Derwent Park	M. Griffiths	548
York City Knights	26–12	Swinton Lions	18 March 2018, 3:00pm	L.D. Nutrition Stadium (Note: Played at Featherstone Rovers' ground due to the pitch at Bootham Crescent being waterlogged.)	M. Mannifield	525
Halifax	6–27	Oldham	20 March 2018, 7:30pm (Note: Fixture postponed on 18 March due to bad weather.)	The Shay	B. Pearson	688
North Wales Crusaders	6–66	Featherstone Rovers	20 March 2018, 7:30pm	L.D. Nutrition Stadium (Note: After being postponed on 18 March and with North Wales' ground being unavailable mid-week, the clubs agreed to reverse the fixture and play at Featherstone to enable the fixture to be played as soon as possible.)	J. Roberts	1,098
Coventry Bears	31–20	Pilkington Recs	25 March 2018, 3pm	Butts Park Arena	A. Sweet	395
Hunslet RLFC	10–34	Bradford Bulls	2 April 2018, 2:00pm	South Leeds Stadium	N. Bennett	1,081

== Fifth round ==
The draw was made on 20 March 2018 by two Women's Super League players, Faye Gaskin of St. Helens and Gemma Walsh of Wigan Warriors.

Home	Score	Away	Match Information
Home	Score	Away	Date and Time	Venue	Referee	Attendance
Widnes Vikings	90–0	Coventry Bears	21 April 2018, 13:00	Select Security Stadium	J McMullen	1,438
Warrington Wolves	54–6	Bradford Bulls	21 April 2018, 15:00	Halliwell Jones Stadium	T Grant	4,710
Doncaster	16–26	Featherstone Rovers	22 April 2018, 15:00	Keepmoat Stadium	M Rossleigh	1,076
Leigh Centurions	40–0	London Broncos	22 April 2018, 15:00	Leigh Sports Village	L Moore	2,507
Oldham	0–32	Hull KR	22 April 2018, 15:00	Bower Fold	G Hewer	1,064
Toronto Wolfpack	16–12	Barrow Raiders	22 April 2018, 15:00	Furness Heating Components Stadium (Note: Tie was played at Barrow even though Toronto were drawn as the home team.)	G Dolan	1,140
Whitehaven	38–0	Rochdale Hornets	22 April 2018, 15:00	Recreation Ground	L Staveley	604
York City Knights	22–34	Catalans Dragons	22 April 2018, 15:00	Bootham Crescent	C Kendall	3,081

== Sixth Round ==
The draw for the Sixth Round was made on 25 April 2018, live on Chris Evans' Breakfast Show on BBC Radio Two, alongside Leeds Rhinos veteran forward Jamie Jones-Buchanan, and Warrington Wolves winger Josh Charnley.

Home	Score	Away	Match Information
Home	Score	Away	Date and Time	Venue	Referee	Attendance
Featherstone Rovers	20–38	Hull F.C.	10 May 2018, 7:35pm	LD Nutrition Stadium	S. Mikalauskas	2,322
Leigh Centurions	22–10	Salford Red Devils	11 May 2018, 7:35pm	Leigh Sports Village	L. Moore	4,024
Huddersfield Giants	24–14	Wakefield Trinity	11 May 2018, 7:45pm	John Smith's Stadium	G. Hewer	2,631
Widnes Vikings	20–23	Leeds Rhinos	11 May 2018, 8:00pm	Select Security Stadium	G. Dolan	1,865
Castleford Tigers	18–36	St. Helens	12 May 2018, 2:30pm	Mend-A-Hose Jungle	J. Child	5,342
Catalans Dragons	56–10	Whitehaven	12 May 2018, 3:30pm	Stade Gilbert Brutus	M. Rossleigh	2,533
Hull KR	10–28	Wigan Warriors	13 May 2018, 3:00pm	MS3 Craven Park	C. Kendall	3,524
Toronto Wolfpack	10–66	Warrington Wolves	13 May 2018, 4:00pm	Halliwell Jones Stadium (Note: Toronto were drawn as the home team, but the game was played at Warrington.)	B. Thaler	6,507

== Quarter-finals ==
The draw for the quarter-finals was made live on BBC Two directly after the conclusion of the Toronto v Warrington game. The draw was made by former players Nathan McAvoy and Robbie Hunter-Paul. Ties were played 31 May – 3 June with all four ties being televised either on Sky Sports or the BBC.

Home	Score	Away	Match Information
Home	Score	Away	Date and Time	Venue	Referee	Attendance
Huddersfield Giants	6–20	Catalans Dragons	31 May 2018, 7:35pm	John Smith's Stadium	G. Hewer	2,151
Leeds Rhinos	52–22	Leigh Centurions	1 June 2018, 7:35pm	LD Nutrition Stadium (Note: Tie moved to Featherstone Rovers' ground due to cricket Test match between England and Pakistan taking place at Headingley Stadium commencing 1 June 2018.)	C. Kendall	3,277
Warrington Wolves	23–0	Wigan Warriors	2 June 2018, 2:30pm	Halliwell Jones Stadium	R. Hicks	10,213
St. Helens	25–22	Hull F.C.	3 June 2018, 3:30pm	Totally Wicked Stadium	B. Thaler	9,644

== Semi-final ==
On 30 May 2018 the RFL announced that the semi-finals would be played as a double header at the University of Bolton Stadium in Bolton on Sunday 5 August 2018. The draw was made live on BBC Two, directly after the end of the St Helens v Hull FC match. The draw was made by Sophie Rohan and Emily Burnette (the members of Belle Voci), who would sing "Abide with Me" before the final on 25 August.

Team 1	Score	Team 2	Match Information
Team 1	Score	Team 2	Date and Time	Venue	Referee	Attendance
St. Helens	16–35	Catalans Dragons	5 August 2018, 12:30pm	University of Bolton Stadium	R. Hicks	26,086
Warrington Wolves	48–12	Leeds Rhinos	5 August 2018, 2:45pm	University of Bolton Stadium	C. Kendall	26,086

== Final ==
Home	Score	Away	Match Information
Home	Score	Away	Date and Time	Venue	Referee	Attendance
Catalans Dragons	20–14	Warrington Wolves	25 August 2018, 3:00pm	Wembley Stadium	R. Hicks	50,672

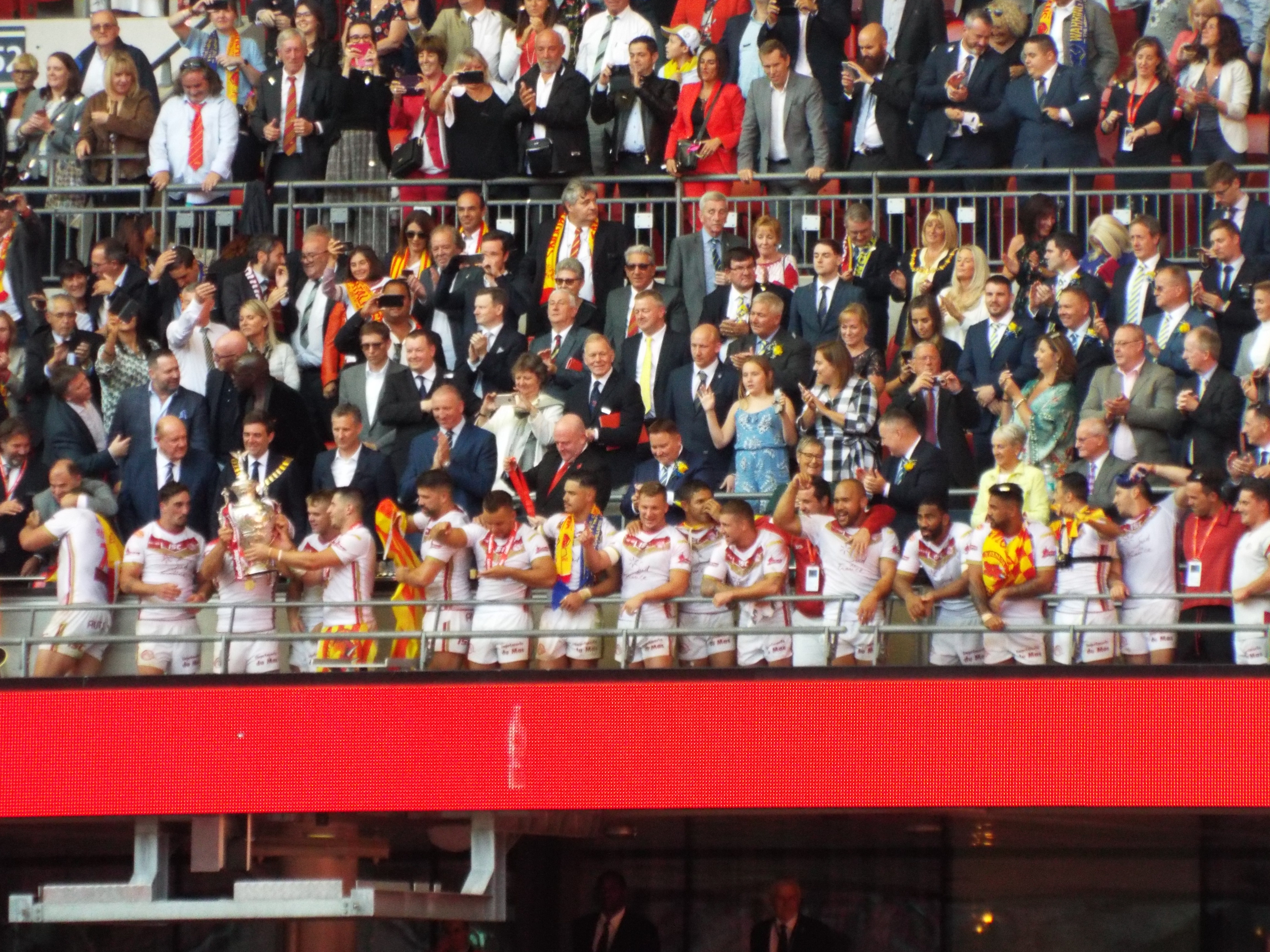
Catalans Dragons lifting the Challenge Cup at Wembley following victory in the Final

Teams:
Catalans: Tony Gigot, Lewis Tierney, David Mead, Brayden Williame, Fouad Yaha, Samisoni Langi, Josh Drinkwater, Mickael Simon, Michael McIlorum, Sam Moa, Benjamin Jullien, Benjamin Garcia, Remi Casty (c).
Substitutes (all used): Julian Bousquet, Jason Baitieri, Kenny Edwards, Mickael Goudemand.
Tries: Tierney, Garcia, Williame. Goals: Drinkwater (4/4)

Warrington: Stefan Ratchford, Tom Lineham, Bryson Goodwin, Toby King, Josh Charnley, Kevin Brown, Tyrone Roberts, Chris Hill (c), Daryl Clark, Mike Cooper, Harvey Livett, Jack Hughes, Ben Westwood.
Substitutes (all used): Ben Murdoch-Masila, George King, Declan Patton, Joe Philbin.
Tries: Murdoch-Masila, G King. Goals: Roberts (3/3)

== Broadcasts ==
The primary broadcast organisation for the competition is BBC Sport. As in 2017 the BBC streamed one tie from each of the first five rounds live on the BBC Sport website with two games from the 6th, 7th and 8th rounds being broadcast live on BBC TV.

=== Live matches ===
Round	Match	Date	Broadcast method
1st	Rochdale Mayfield v Crosfields	27 January, 2:00pm	streamed BBC Sport
2nd	Featherstone Lions v Thatto Heath Crusaders	10 February, 2:00pm	streamed BBC Sport
3rd	Coventry Bears v Distington	25 February, 3:00pm	streamed BBC Sport
4th	Normanton Knights v Rochdale Hornets	17 March, 2:00pm	streamed BBC Sport
5th	York City Knights v Catalans Dragons	22 April, 2:00pm	streamed BBC Sport
6th	Featherstone Rovers v Hull F.C.	10 May, 7:35pm	Sky Sports Arena
6th	Leigh Centurions v Salford Red Devils	11 May, 7:35pm	Sky Sports Arena
6th	Castleford Tigers v St Helens	12 May, 2:30pm	BBC One
6th	Toronto Wolfpack v Warrington Wolves	13 May, 3:30pm	BBC Two
QF	Huddersfield Giants v Catalans Dragons	31 May, 7:35pm	Sky Sports Arena
QF	Leeds Rhinos v Leigh Centurions	1 June, 7:35pm	Sky Sports Arena
QF	Warrington Wolves v Wigan Warriors	2 June, 2:30pm	BBC One
QF	St. Helens v Hull F.C.	3 June, 3:30pm	BBC Two
SF	St. Helens v Catalans Dragons	5 August, 12:30pm	BBC One
SF	Warrington Wolves v Leeds Rhinos	5 August, 2:45pm	BBC One
F	Catalans Dragons v Warrington Wolves	25 August, 3:00pm	BBC One

== See also ==
- 2018 Women's Challenge Cup
