= 2017 Bradford Bulls season =

- Championship Rank: 12th
- Play-off result: Relegation
- Challenge Cup: 4th Round
- 2017 record: Wins: 11; draws: 0; losses: 20
- Points scored: For: 711; against: 882

Team information
- Chairman: Graham Lowe and Andrew Chalmers
- Head Coach: Geoff Toovey (was Leigh Beattie)
- Captain: Scott Moore (was Leon Pryce)
- Stadium: Odsal Stadium
- High attendance: 4,987 vs. Hull Kingston Rovers

Top scorers
- Tries: James Bentley (18)
- Goals: Oscar Thomas (60)
- Points: Oscar Thomas (139)
← 2016	List of seasons	2018 →

This article details the Bradford Bulls rugby league football club's 2017 season. This is the Bulls' 3rd season in the Championship. They csme into this season as Championship Shield winners after defeating the Sheffield Eagles 27-16 in the Championship Shield Final.

== Season review ==
=== August 2016 ===
It was announced that French international Jean-Philippe Baile left the Bulls by mutual consent after playing just one game in the 2016 season. During the same week, newly formed League 1 side Toronto Wolfpack signed Bulls prop Dan Fleming on a one-year contract. Tongan winger Etu Uaisele also left Bradford after being sent on loan to Dewsbury Rams, he returned home to Australia following his release. Fullback Richie Mathers announced his retirement shortly after the defeat by Dewsbury Rams. Super League side Warrington Wolves signed Bradford centre and former player Matty Blythe on a one-year deal. Captain Adrian Purtell announced that he would join the London Broncos on a two-year deal, shortly after second rower Jay Pitts joined the departing Purtell to join London. Veteran prop forward Rhys Lovegrove announced his retirement from the sport after suffering from a recurring head injury, he joined the backroom staff. The first signings for the 2017 season came in the form of a London trio: winger Ilies Macani, centre Alex Foster and prop forward Jon Magrin, all on two-year deals. Towards the end of the month the Bulls announced that former academy graduate and club legend Leon Pryce would be returning on a one-year deal in order to finish his career at the Bradford Bulls.

=== September 2016 ===
Lucas Walshaw made his loan deal at Dewsbury Rams into a permanent one by signing a two-year contract. Wakefield Trinity Wildcats centre/second row Jason Walton became the 5th signing for the 2017 season by putting pen to paper on a two-year deal at the Bulls. Bradford born prop forward Ross Peltier signed a two-year deal with the Bulls from local side Keighley Cougars.

=== October 2016 ===
Long serving academy loose forward Danny Addy and New Zealand prop forward Mitch Clark both signed one-year deals at Hull Kingston Rovers. Due to Hull KR's relegation, both of their contracts were voided and had the option to re-sign for the Bulls; however, both decided to honor their contracts with the Hull side. Ex-Bradford player Phil Joseph signed a two-year deal to rejoin the club after a lack of game time at Salford Red Devils, shortly after the Bulls announced the signing of Australian loose forward Lachlan Burr from the Gold Coast Titans on a one-year deal. Bradford were due to sign Manly Sea Eagles forward Blake Leary, but negotiations fell through at the vital point of talks.

=== November 2016 ===
Second-row forward Kurt Haggerty retired from playing rugby league to further his coaching career, he signed on the backroom staff for new Canadian side Toronto Wolfpack. Second rower Tom Olbison also signed a one-year extension to his contract. Prop forward Steve Crossley announced that he had signed for Toronto for the upcoming season. Huddersfield Giants announced the signing of prop Paul Clough from the Bulls. In addition to this stand off, Lee Gaskell signed a four-year deal with the Giants. During this month, owner Marc Green placed the club in administration for the third time in four years due to outstanding tax owed to HMRC. Meanwhile, Huddersfield announced the signing of Dale Ferguson from the Bulls on a two-year deal.

=== December 2016 ===
Due to the club being in administration, no signings were made in December. According to the administrator there were a number of bids for the club include a couple from multi-millionaires hoping to invest in Odsal Stadium and its surrounding lands. However, none of these were successful.

=== January 2017 ===
The administrators announced that two last minute bids were unsuccessful and therefore the club was liquidated. Following this news, winger James Clare signed for Leigh Centurions on a two-year deal. This sparked an exodus at Odsal as players became free agents. Academy products Tom Olbison, Alex Mellor and Adam O'Brien all signed with Super League clubs as Olbison joined Widnes Vikings with Mellor and O'Brien joining the Huddersfield Giants on long term deals. Top try scorer Kris Welham attracted numerous offers before settling on Salford Red Devils and second rower Jason Walton signed with RFL Championship side Featherstone Rovers. Superstar fullback Kieren Moss and prop Ben Kavanagh also signed for Hull Kingston Rovers. The Rugby Football League (RFL) accepted a bid to found a new club in Bradford. It was announced that Andrew Chalmers and a former Wigan Warriors coach, Graham Lowe, were the successful new owners. They immediately signed veteran halfback Leon Pryce and released coach Rohan Smith. In addition to this, they declined to offer Aussie halfback Dane Chisholm a contract with the new club. During the owners press conference they revealed that Manly Sea Eagles legend Geoff Toovey would become the Bulls' new coach for the 2017 season. Leon Pryce was revealed as the captain. Australian second rower Lachlan Burr signed for Leigh Centurions. The Bulls re-signed the rest of the off contract players. With a makeshift side the Bulls lost 10-28 to a strong Huddersfield Giants side with Joe Keyes and Ross Oakes scoring for Bradford, Keyes kicked a conversion. Second-row forward Colton Roche put pen to paper on a deal to join the Bulls for the 2017 season from York City Knights. In the final pre-season match, Bradford narrowly lost 24-25 to League 1 side Keighley Cougars. New signing Roche scored the opening try before young hooker Joe Lumb scored. Oakes carried on from the previous week and scored whilst Iliess Macani also went over for a try, Keyes kicked three goals and Oscar Thomas kicked a conversion. Squad numbers were released at the end of the month, with Pryce receiving the number 6 shirt.

=== February 2017 ===
Reinforces were made to the squad as Leeds Rhinos loaned out halfback Jordan Lilley, second row Josh Jordan-Roberts, hooker Sam Hallas and prop Mikolaj Oledzki on a one-month loan to the Bulls ahead of the opening game. The opening game of the season saw the Bulls lose 24-54 to RFL Championship favourites Hull Kingston Rovers. The Bulls took an early lead through young prop Liam Kirk before Hull KR scored a few tries to take the lead. Academy graduate Ross Oakes also scored before fan favourite Ethan Ryan raced 80m to score an interception try ten minutes from full-time. Iliess Macani scored a consolation try after a Jordan Lilley intercept whilst fullback Oscar Thomas kicked four conversions. Following the defeat the Bulls announced the capture of young Samoan rugby sevens star Phoenix Hunapo-Nofoa on a one-year deal. The first home game of the season saw 4,051 people watch the Bulls narrowly lose 14-22 to the Rochdale Hornets. Youngster James Bentley and Thomas both scored tries whilst Thomas kicked 3 goals in the defeat. After being out powered in the pack the Bulls announced the signing of French international, second row forward Kevin Larroyer on a one-month loan deal from Castleford Tigers. Bradford added more experience signing ex-international Scott Moore on a 4-game trial and also utility back Lee Smith on a two-year deal.

== Milestones ==
- Round 1: Iliess Macani, Colton Roche, Jon Magrin, Ross Peltier, Brandan Wilkinson, Jordan Lilley, Sam Hallas, Josh Jordan-Roberts and Mikolaj Oledzki all made their debuts for the Bulls.
- Round 1: Leon Pryce made his debut in his second stint with the Bulls.
- Round 1: Iliess Macani and Liam Kirk scored their 1st tries for the Bulls.
- Round 2: James Bentley scored his 1st try for the Bulls.
- Round 3: Kevin Larroyer and Scott Moore made their debuts for the Bulls.
- Round 3: Ethan Ryan scored his 3rd hat-trick for the Bulls.
- Round 4: Lee Smith and Daniel Murray made their debuts for the Bulls.
- Round 4: Scott Moore scored his 1st try for the Bulls.
- Round 5: Kevin Larroyer and Colton Roche scored their 1st tries for the Bulls.
- CCR4: Evan Hodgson and Reiss Butterworth made their debuts for the Bulls.
- CCR4: Evan Hodgson scored his 1st try for the Bulls.
- CCR4: Joe Keyes kicked his 1st drop goal for the Bulls.
- Round 7: Lee Smith, Daniel Murray, Jon Magrin and Brandan Wilkinson scored their 1st tries for the Bulls.
- Round 7: Jordan Lilley kicked his 1st goal for the Bulls.
- Round 9: James Davies made his debut for the Bulls.
- Round 9: James Bentley scored his 1st four-try haul and 1st hat-trick for the Bulls.
- Round 9: Oscar Thomas reached 100 points for the Bulls.
- Round 10: Ethan Ryan scored his 25th try and reached 100 points for the Bulls.
- Round 11: Keenan Tomlinson made his debut for the Bulls.
- Round 12: Brandon Pickersgill and Matthew Storton made their debuts for the Bulls.
- Round 12: James Davies scored his 1st try for the Bulls.
- Round 13: Ted Chapelhow and Sam Brooks made their debut for the Bulls.
- Round 14: Cameron Smith made his debut for the Bulls.
- Round 14: Cameron Smith scored his 1st try for the Bulls.
- Round 15: Dane Chisholm made his debut in his second stint at the Bulls.
- Round 15: Dane Chisholm scored his 1st try and kicked his 1st drop goal in his second stint at the Bulls.
- Round 18: Ed Chamberlain made his debut for the Bulls.
- Round 18: Ted Chapelhow scored his 1st try for the Bulls.
- Round 19: Ethan Ryan scored his 1st four-try haul and 4th hat-trick for the Bulls.
- Round 19: Ed Chamberlain scored his 1st try for the Bulls.
- Round 20: Ashley Gibson made his debut for the Bulls.
- Round 20: Vila Halafihi scored his 1st try for the Bulls.
- Round 21: Damian Sironen and Cory Aston made their debut for the Bulls.
- Round 21: Cory Aston scored his 1st try for the Bulls.
- Round 23: Willie Tonga made his debut for the Bulls.
- Round 23: Damian Sironen scored his 1st try for the Bulls.
- Round 23: Cory Aston kicked his 1st goal for the Bulls.
- Championship Shield Game 1: Ross Peltier scored his 1st try for the Bulls.
- Championship Shield Game 1: Lee Smith kicked his 1st goal for the Bulls.
- Championship Shield Game 2: Josh Rickett scored his 1st try for the Bulls.
- Championship Shield Game 3: Sam Hallas and Mikolaj Oledzki scored their 1st try for the Bulls.
- Championship Shield Game 5: Omari Caro scored his 4th hat-trick for the Bulls.

== Pre-season friendlies ==
Legend
Win
Draw
Loss

Bulls score is first.

Date	Competition	Vrs	H/A	Venue	Result	Score	Tries	Goals	Att	Report
22 January 2017	Pre season	Huddersfield Giants	A	Galpharm Stadium	L	10-28	Keyes, Oakes	Keyes 1/2	2,876	Report
29 January 2017	Pre season	Keighley Cougars	A	Cougar Park	L	24-25	Roche, Lumb, Oakes, Macani	Keyes 3/3, Thomas 1/1	2,231	Report

== Player appearances ==
- Friendly games only

FB=Fullback	C=Centre	W=Winger	SO=Stand off	SH=Scrum half	P=Prop	H=Hooker	SR=Second row	LF=Loose forward	B=Bench

No	Player	1	2
2	Ethan Ryan		W
3	James Mendieka	C	C
4	Ross Oakes	C	C
5	Iliess Macani	W	W
6	Leon Pryce		SO
7	Joe Keyes	SH	SH
8	Liam Kirk	P	P
9	Joe Lumb	H	H
11	Colton Roche	SR	SR
14	Oscar Thomas	x	B
15	Jon Magrin	B	B
17	Ross Peltier	P	P
18	Omari Caro	W	
19	Johnny Campbell	FB	FB
20	James Bentley	SR	SR
21	Brandan Wilkinson	L	L
24	Brandon Pickersgill	SO	B
25	Keenan Tomlinson	B	B
26	Vila Halafihi	B	B
27	Josh Rickett	B	B
n/a	Reiss Butterworth	B	B
n/a	Evan Hodgson	B	B
n/a	Vitas Vaznys	B	B
n/a	Will Moxon	x	B

= Injured

= Suspended

== Fixtures and results ==
Legend
Win
Draw
Loss

2017 Championship

Date	Competition	Rnd	Vrs	H/A	Venue	Result	Score	Tries	Goals	Att	Live on TV	Report
5 February 2017	Championship	1	Hull Kingston Rovers	A	Craven Park	L	24-54	Kirk, Macani, Oakes, Ryan	Thomas 4/4	8,817	-	Report
12 February 2017	Championship	2	Rochdale Hornets	H	Odsal Stadium	L	14-22	Bentley, Thomas	Thomas 3/4	4,051	-	Report
19 February 2017	Championship	3	Swinton Lions	A	Heywood Road	W	35-28	Ryan (3), Mendeika, Oakes, Thomas	Thomas 5/7, Thomas 1 DG	1,192	-	Report
26 February 2017	Championship	4	Toulouse Olympique	H	Odsal Stadium	W	29-22	Bentley, Macani, Moore, Oakes, Ryan	Thomas 4/6, Thomas 1 DG	4,514	-	Report
5 March 2017	Championship	5	London Broncos	A	Trailfinders Sports Ground	L	12-42	Larroyer, Roche	Thomas 2/2	1,608	-	Report
12 March 2017	Championship	6	Batley Bulldogs	H	Odsal Stadium	W	44-22	Campbell (2), Oakes (2), Bentley, Larroyer, Ryan, Thomas	Thomas 6/8, Ryan 0/1	4,478	-	Report
26 March 2017	Championship	7	Dewsbury Rams	H	Odsal Stadium	W	56-18	Macani (2), Magrin (2), Caro, Murray, Oakes, Roche, L.Smith, Wilkinson	Keyes 5/7, Lilley 2/2, Caro 1/1	4,436	-	Report
2 April 2017	Championship	8	Oldham R.L.F.C.	A	Bower Fold	L	22-26	Bentley, Keyes, Ryan, L.Smith	Lilley 3/5	1,681	-	Report
9 April 2017	Championship	9	Sheffield Eagles	H	Odsal Stadium	W	48-16	Bentley (4), Campbell, Murray, Oakes, Ryan	Thomas 8/8	4,126	-	Report
14 April 2017	Championship	10	Halifax RLFC	H	Odsal Stadium	L	12-22	Macani, Ryan	Thomas 2/2	4,871	-	Report
17 April 2017	Championship	11	Featherstone Rovers	A	Post Office Road	L	18-44	Oakes (2), Caro	Thomas 3/3	3,112	-	Report
29 April 2017	Championship	12	Toulouse Olympique	A	Stade Ernest-Argeles	L	4-60	Davies	Thomas 0/1	3,603	-	Report
7 May 2017	Championship	13	Sheffield Eagles	A	Belle Vue	L	16-52	Campbell, Hodgson, Thomas	Keyes 2/3	1,493	-	Report
21 May 2017	Championship	14	London Broncos	H	Odsal Stadium	L	12-56	Campbell, C.Smith	Thomas 2/2	3,633	-	Report
27 May 2017	Summer Bash	15	Hull Kingston Rovers	N	Bloomfield Road	L	19-20	Bentley, Chisholm, Ryan	Thomas 3/3, Chisholm 1 DG	11,557	Sky Sports	Report
4 June 2017	Championship	16	Dewsbury Rams	A	Rams Stadium	L	12-32	Bentley, Macani	Thomas 2/2	1,975	-	Report
11 June 2017	Championship	17	Featherstone Rovers	H	Odsal Stadium	L	12-36	Bentley, Roche	Thomas 2/2	3,931	-	Report
18 June 2017	Championship	18	Rochdale Hornets	A	Spotland Stadium	L	14-28	Bentley, Chapelhow	Thomas 3/3	1,600	-	Report
25 June 2017	Championship	19	Oldham R.L.F.C.	H	Odsal Stadium	W	47-12	Ryan (4), Bentley (2), Chamberlain (2), Mendeika	Thomas 5/9, Thomas 1 DG	3,700	-	Report
2 July 2017	Championship	20	Halifax RLFC	A	Shay Stadium	L	18-20	Chapelhow, Halafihi, Ryan	Thomas 3/3	3,412	-	Report
9 July 2017	Championship	21	Hull Kingston Rovers	H	Odsal Stadium	L	10-42	Aston, Kirk	Thomas 1/2	4,987	-	Report
16 July 2017	Championship	22	Batley Bulldogs	A	Mount Pleasant	L	16-23	Chamberlain, Keyes, Macani	Thomas 2/3	4,987	-	Report
23 July 2017	Championship	23	Swinton Lions	H	Odsal Stadium	L	6-16	Sironen	Aston 1/1	3,291	-	Report

2017 Championship Shield

Date	Competition	Rnd	Vrs	H/A	Venue	Result	Score	Tries	Goals	Att	Live on TV	Report
6 August 2017	Championship	S1	Toulouse Olympique	H	Odsal Stadium	L	10-26	Macani, Peltier	L.Smith 1/2	3,000	-	Report
13 August 2017	Championship	S2	Oldham R.L.F.C.	A	Bower Fold	W	20-16	Aston, Bentley, Moore, Rickett	L.Smith 1/3, Aston 1/1	853	-	Report
20 August 2017	Championship	S3	Swinton Lions	A	Heywood Road	W	30-16	Bentley (2), Halafihi, Hallas, Oledzki	Aston 5/7	660	-	Report
28 August 2017	Championship	S4	Batley Bulldogs	H	Odsal Stadium	L	18-44	Hallas, Kirk, Macani	Aston 3/3	2,609	-	Report
3 September 2017	Championship	S5	Sheffield Eagles	A	Belle Vue	W	32-18	Caro (3), Halafihi, Macani, L.Smith	Aston 4/6	700	-	Report
10 September 2017	Championship	S6	Dewsbury Rams	A	Rams Stadium	W	16-12	Aston, Peltier, L.Smith	Aston 2/3	1,369	-	Report
17 September 2017	Championship	S7	Rochdale Hornets	H	Odsal Stadium	W	72-16	Peltier (2), Ryan (2), Aston, Bentley, Caro, Halafihi, Hallas, Keyes, Kirk, Moore, Oakes	Aston 9/11, Caro 1/2	3,609	-	Report

== Player appearances ==
- Championship only

FB=Fullback	C=Centre	W=Winger	SO=Stand-off	SH=Scrum half	PR=Prop	H=Hooker	SR=Second row	L=Loose forward	B=Bench

No	Player	1	2	3	4	5	6	7	8	9	10	11	12	13	14	15	16	17	18	19	20	21	22	23	-	S1	S2	S3	S4	S5	S6	S7
1	Lee Smith	x	x	x	B	SO	SH	C	C																-	FB	FB	FB	FB	C	C	
2	Ethan Ryan	W	W	W	W	W	W	W	W	C	C	C	C	W	C	C	C			W	W	W			-					FB	FB	FB
3	James Mendeika	C	C	C	C	C	C						FB	C				C	B	C	C	C	C	x	-	C	C	C	C	x	x	x
4	Ross Oakes	C	C	C	C	C	C	C	C	C	C	C	C	C				C	C	C					-							C
5	Iliess Macani	W	W	W	W	W	B	W	W	x	B	W		B	W	W	W	W					W	W	-	W	W	W	W	W	W	W
6	Leon Pryce	SO	SO	SO	SO		SO			SO	SO		SO	SO	SO	x	x	x	x	x	x	x	x	x	-	x	x	x	x	x	x	x
7	Joe Keyes			SH	x	SH		SH	SH	B	SH	SH	x	SH	B	B	SO		SO	SO	SO	SH	SH	SH	-	SH	SH			SH	SH	SH
8	Liam Kirk	P	P	B	B	B	B	B	B	B	P	P	P	P	P	P	P	P	P	B	B	P	P	P	-	P	P	P	P	P	P	P
9	Joe Lumb	H	H						x	x	x	x	x	x	x	x	x	x	x	x	x	x	x	x	-	x	x	x	x	x	x	x
10	Damian Sironen	x	x	x	x	x	x	x	x	x	x	x	x	x	x	x	x	x	x	x	x	L	L	L	-	L	L	L	L	L	L	L
11	Colton Roche	SR	SR	P	P	B	SR	SR	SR	L	B		L	SR	SR	SR	SR	SR		B	L		B	SR	-	P	P	P			B	B
13	Dane Chisholm	x	x	x	x	x	x	x	x	x	x	x	x	x	x	SO									-							
14	Oscar Thomas	FB	FB	FB	FB	FB	FB			FB	FB	SO	SH	FB	FB	FB	FB	SO	FB	FB	FB	FB	FB	x	-	x	x	SO	x	x	x	x
15	Jon Magrin	B	P	P	P	P	P	P	P	P	P	P	P	P	P	P	P	P	Red card	P	P	P	P	P	-					P	x	P
16	Kevin Larroyer	x	x	SR	SR	SR	SR	SR		SR	SR	SR	SR	x	x	x	x	x	x	x	x	x	x	x	-	x	x	x	x	x	x	x
17	Ross Peltier	P	B	x	x	x	B								B	L	L	B	P	B	B			B	-	B	B	B	P	B	B	B
18	Omari Caro							B	B	W	W	W	W				W	W	W					B	-				x	C	W	W
19	Johnny Campbell	x	x	x	x	B	W	FB	FB	W	W	FB	W	W	W	W			W				W	W	-	Red card	Red card	W				
20	James Bentley	SR	SR	SR	SR	L	L		SR	SR	SR	SR				C	C	SR	SR	SR	SR	SR	SR	SR	-	SR	SR	SR	SR	SR	SR	SR
21	Brandan Wilkinson	L	L	x	x	x	x	L	L	B	L	L	B					B	B	x	x	B	x	x	-	x	B	B	B	B	B	x
22	Daniel Murray	x	x	x	B	P	P	P	P	P	x	x	x	x	x	x	x	x	x	x	x	x	x	x	-	x	x	x	x	x	x	x
23	Ashley Gibson	x	x	x	x	x	x	x	x	x	x	x	x	x	x	x	x	x	x	x	C	C			-							
24	Brandon Pickersgill	x	x	x	x	x	x	x	x	x	x	x	B	x	x	x	x	FB	x	x	x	x	x	FB	-	x	x	x	B	x	x	x
25	Keenen Tomlinson	x	x	x	x	x	x	x	x	x	x	B	x	x	x	x	x	x	x	x	x	x	x	x	-	x	x	x	x	x	x	x
26	Vila Halafihi	x	x	B	x	x	x	B	B	x	x	B	x	x	C	x	SR	B	x	x	B	x	x	x	-	C	C	C	C	C	C	C
27	Josh Rickett	x	x	x	x	x	x	x	x	x	x	x	x	x	x	x	x	x	x	x	x	x	x	C	-	W	W	x	W	x	x	x
28	Jordan Lilley	SH	SH		SH	x	x	SO	SO	SH	x	x	x	x	SH	SH	SH	SH	SH	SH	x	x	x	x	-	x	x	x	x	x	x	x
29	Sam Hallas	B	B					x	x	x	x	x	x	L	H	H	H	L	L	L	H	H	B	B	-	B	B	B	H	H	H	B
30	Josh Jordan-Roberts	B	B	L	L	SR	x	B	B	x	x	x	x	x	x	x	x	x	x	x	x	x	x	x	-	x	x	x	x	x	x	x
31	Mikolaj Oledzki	B	B	B	B	B	B	x	x	x	x	x	x	x	B	B	B			P	P	B	B	x	-	B	B	B	B	B	P	B
32	Johnny Walker	x	x	B	x	x	x	x	x	x	x	x	x	x	x	x	x	x	x	x	x	x	x	x	-	x	x	x	x	x	x	x
33	Reiss Butterworth	x	x	x	x	x	x	x	x	x	x	x	x	x	x	x	x	x	x	x	SH	B	x	x	-	x	x	x	x	B	x	x
34	Scott Moore	x	x	H	H	H	H	H	H	H	H	H	H	H		B	B	H	H	H	Red card	Red card	H	H	-	H	H	H	SO		B	H
35	Evan Hodgson	x	x	x	x	x	x	x	x	x	B	B	SR	SR	x	x	x	x	x	x	x	x	x	x	-	x	x	x	x	SR	SR	SR
36	James Davies	x	x	x	x	x	x	x	x	B	B	B	B	B	B	B	B	B	B	B		B		B	-	B	x	x	B	x	x	x
37	Cameron Smith	x	x	x	x	x	x	x	x	x	x	x	x	x	SR	SR			SR	SR	SR	SR	SR	x	-	SR	SR	SR	SR			
38	Ted Chapelhow	x	x	x	x	x	x	x	x	x	x	x	x	B	L	x	B	B	x	x	B	x	B	x	-	x	x	x	x	x	x	x
40	Ed Chamberlain	x	x	x	x	x	x	x	x	x	x	x	x	x	x	x	x	x	C	W	W	W	C	x	-	x	x	x	x	x	x	x
41	Cory Aston	x	x	x	x	x	x	x	x	x	x	x	x	x	x	x	x	x	x	x	x	SO	SO	SO	-	SO	SO	SH	SH	SO	SO	SO
44	Willie Tonga	x	x	x	x	x	x	x	x	x	x	x	x	x	x	x	x	x	x	x	x	x	x	C	-							
n/a	Sam Brooks	x	x	x	x	x	x	x	x	x	x	x	x	B	x	x	x	x	x	x	x	x	x	x	-	x	x	x	x	x	x	x
n/a	Matthew Storton	x	x	x	x	x	x	x	x	x	x	x	B	x	x	x	x	x	x	x	x	x	x	x	-	x	x	x	x	x	x	x

= Injured

= Suspended

== Challenge Cup ==
LEGEND
Win
Draw
Loss

Date	Competition	Rnd	Vrs	H/A	Venue	Result	Score	Tries	Goals	Att	TV	Report
19 March 2017	Cup	4th	Featherstone Rovers	H	Odsal Stadium	L	13-21	Campbell, Hodgson	Keyes 2/2, Keyes 1 DG	2,458	-	Report

== Player appearances ==
- Challenge Cup games only

FB=Fullback	C=Centre	W=Winger	SO=Stand off	SH=Scrum half	P=Prop	H=Hooker	SR=Second row	L=Loose forward	B=Bench

No	Player	4
1	Lee Smith	
2	Ethan Ryan	W
3	James Mendeika	C
4	Ross Oakes	C
5	Iliess Macani	W
6	Leon Pryce	SO
7	Joe Keyes	SH
8	Liam Kirk	B
9	Joe Lumb	H
11	Colton Roche	
14	Oscar Thomas	x
15	Jon Magrin	P
16	Kevin Larroyer	x
17	Ross Peltier	P
18	Omari Caro	
19	Johnny Campbell	FB
20	James Bentley	SR
21	Brandan Wilkinson	SR
22	Daniel Murray	x
24	Brandon Pickersgill	x
25	Keenen Tomlinson	x
26	Vila Halafihi	L
27	Josh Rickett	x
28	Jordan Lilley	x
29	Sam Hallas	x
30	Josh Jordan-Roberts	x
31	Mikolaj Oledzki	x
32	Jonathan Walker	x
33	Reiss Butterworth	B
34	Scott Moore	B
35	Evan Hodgson	B

== Squad statistics ==
- Appearances and points including Super League, Challenge Cup and play-offs as of 17 September 2017.

No	Player	Position	Age	Previous club	Apps	Tries	Goals	DG	Points
1	Lee Smith	Fullback	30	Leigh Centurions	11	4	2	0	20
2	Ethan Ryan	Wing	20	Bradford Bulls Academy	23	17	0	0	68
3	James Mendeika	Centre	25	Featherstone Rovers	19	2	0	0	8
4	Ross Oakes	Centre	20	Bradford Bulls Academy	18	10	0	0	40
5	Iliess Macani	Wing	23	London Broncos	25	10	0	0	40
6	Leon Pryce	Stand-off	35	Hull F.C.	11	0	0	0	0
7	Joe Keyes	Scrum-half	21	London Broncos	23	3	9	1	31
8	Liam Kirk	Prop	19	Bradford Bulls Academy	31	4	0	0	16
9	Joe Lumb	Hooker	20	Bradford Bulls Academy	3	0	0	0	0
10	Damian Sironen	Prop	24	Tweed Heads Seagulls	10	1	0	0	4
11	Colton Roche	Second-row	23	York City Knights	25	3	0	0	12
13	Dane Chisholm	Scrum-half	26	Sheffield Eagles	1	1	0	1	5
14	Oscar Thomas	Stand-off	23	London Broncos	21	4	60	3	139
15	Jon Magrin	Prop	22	London Broncos	25	2	0	0	8
16	Kevin Larroyer	Second-row	27	Castleford Tigers (loan)	9	2	0	0	8
17	Ross Peltier	Prop	24	Keighley Cougars	19	4	0	0	16
18	Omari Caro	Wing	25	Hull Kingston Rovers	13	6	2	0	28
19	Johnny Campbell	Fullback	25	Batley Bulldogs	16	6	0	0	24
20	James Bentley	Loose forward	19	Bradford Bulls Academy	27	18	0	0	72
21	Brandan Wilkinson	Loose forward	18	Bradford Bulls Academy	17	1	0	0	4
22	Daniel Murray	Prop	20	Salford Red Devils (loan)	6	2	0	0	8
23	Ashley Gibson	Centre	30	Wakefield Trinity	2	0	0	0	0
24	Brandon Pickersgill	Stand-off	19	Bradford Bulls Academy	4	0	0	0	0
25	Keenen Tomlinson	Second-row	18	Bradford Bulls Academy	1	0	0	0	0
26	Vila Halafihi	Hooker	23	Penrith Panthers	16	4	0	0	16
27	Josh Rickett	Wing	18	Bradford Bulls Academy	4	1	0	0	4
28	Jordan Lilley	Scrum-half	20	Leeds Rhinos (loan)	12	0	5	0	10
29	Sam Hallas	Hooker	20	Leeds Rhinos (loan)	20	3	0	0	12
30	Josh Jordan-Roberts	Second-row	18	Leeds Rhinos (loan)	7	0	0	0	0
31	Mikolaj Oledzki	Prop	18	Leeds Rhinos (loan)	20	1	0	0	4
32	Jonathan Walker	Prop	26	Leigh Centurions	1	0	0	0	0
33	Reiss Butterworth	Hooker	17	Bradford Bulls Academy	4	0	0	0	0
34	Scott Moore	Hooker	29	Wakefield Trinity	25	3	0	0	12
35	Evan Hodgson	Prop	18	Bradford Bulls Academy	9	2	0	0	8
36	James Davies	Prop	23	Unattached	15	1	0	0	4
37	Cameron Smith	Second-row	18	Leeds Rhinos (loan)	11	1	0	0	4
40	Ed Chamberlain	Centre	N/A	Widnes Vikings (dual registration)	5	3	0	0	12
41	Cory Aston	Scrum-half	22	Leeds Rhinos (loan)	10	4	25	0	66
44	Willie Tonga	Centre	32	Leigh Centurions	1	0	0	0	0
n/a	Matthew Storton	Prop	N/A	Bradford Bulls Academy	1	0	0	0	0
n/a	Ted Chapelhow	Prop	N/A	Widnes Vikings (dual registration)	6	2	0	0	8
n/a	Sam Brooks	Prop	N/A	Widnes Vikings (dual registration)	1	0	0	0	0

= Injured = Suspended

== Transfers ==
=== In ===
	Name	Position	Signed from	Date
(England)	Iliess Macani	Wing	London Broncos	August 2016
(England)	Alex Foster	Centre	London Broncos	August 2016
(Malta)	Jon Magrin	Prop	London Broncos	August 2016
(England)	Leon Pryce	Stand-off	Hull F.C.	August 2016
(England)	Jason Walton	Centre	Wakefield Trinity Wildcats	September 2016
(England)	Ross Peltier	Prop	Keighley Cougars	September 2016
(England)	Phil Joseph	Prop	Salford Red Devils	October 2016
(Australia)	Lachlan Burr	Second-row	Gold Coast Titans	October 2016
(England)	Colton Roche	Second-row	York City Knights	February 2017
(England)	Jordan Lilley	Scrum half	Leeds Rhinos (loan)	February 2017
(England)	Josh Jordan-Roberts	Second-row	Leeds Rhinos (loan)	February 2017
(England)	Sam Hallas	Hooker	Leeds Rhinos (loan)	February 2017
(Poland)	Mikolaj Oledzki	Prop	Leeds Rhinos (loan)	February 2017
(Samoa)	Phoenix Hunapo-Nofoa	Fullback	Samoa	February 2017
(France)	Kevin Larroyer	Second-row	Castleford Tigers (loan)	February 2017
(England)	Scott Moore	Hooker	Wakefield Trinity Wildcats	February 2017
(England)	Lee Smith	Fullback	Leigh Centurions	February 2017
(England)	Daniel Murray	Prop	Salford Red Devils (loan)	February 2017
(England)	Ted Chapelhow	Prop	Widnes Vikings (DR)	May 2017
(England)	Sam Brooks	Prop	Widnes Vikings (DR)	May 2017
(England)	Cameron Smith	Second-row	Leeds Rhinos (loan)	May 2017
(Australia)	Dane Chisholm	Scrum half	Sheffield Eagles	May 2017
(England)	Ashley Gibson	Centre	Wakefield Trinity	June 2017
(Australia)	Damian Sironen	Prop	Tweed Heads Seagulls	June 2017
(England)	Cory Aston	Scrum half	Leeds Rhinos (loan)	July 2017

=== Out ===
	Name	Position	Club Signed	Date
(France)	Jean-Philippe Baile	Centre	France	August 2016
(England)	Dan Fleming	Prop	Toronto Wolfpack	August 2016
(Tonga)	Etu Uaisele	Wing	Australia	August 2016
(England)	Richie Mathers	Fullback	Retirement	August 2016
(England)	Matty Blythe	Centre	Warrington Wolves	August 2016
(Australia)	Adrian Purtell	Centre	London Broncos	August 2016
(England)	Jay Pitts	Second-row	London Broncos	August 2016
(Australia)	Rhys Lovegrove	Prop	Retirement	August 2016
(England)	Lucas Walshaw	Second-row	Dewsbury Rams	September 2016
(England)	Danny Addy	Loose forward	Hull Kingston Rovers	October 2016
(New Zealand)	Mitch Clark	Prop	Hull Kingston Rovers	October 2016
(England)	Kurt Haggerty	Second-row	Retirement	November 2016
(England)	Steve Crossley	Prop	Toronto Wolfpack	November 2016
(England)	Paul Clough	Prop	Huddersfield Giants	November 2016
(England)	Lee Gaskell	Stand off	Huddersfield Giants	November 2016
(England)	Dale Ferguson	Second-row	Huddersfield Giants	November 2016
(England)	Alex Mellor	Second-row	Huddersfield Giants	January 2017
(England)	Adam O'Brien	Hooker	Huddersfield Giants	January 2017
(England)	Jason Walton	Second-row	Featherstone Rovers	January 2017
(England)	Kris Welham	Centre	Salford Red Devils	January 2017
(England)	James Clare	Wing	Leigh Centurions	January 2017
(England)	Tom Olbison	Second-row	Widnes Vikings	January 2017
(Australia)	Kieren Moss	Fullback	Hull Kingston Rovers	January 2017
(Australia)	Dane Chisholm	Scrum half	Released	January 2017
(Australia)	Lachlan Burr	Second-row	Leigh Centurions	January 2017
(England)	Jacob Trueman	Scrum half	Castleford Tigers	January 2017
(England)	Ben Kavanagh	Prop	Hull Kingston Rovers	January 2017
(England)	Phil Joseph	Prop	Workington Town	February 2017
(England)	Alex Foster	Centre	Castleford Tigers	February 2017
(Samoa)	Phoenix Hunapo-Nofoa	Fullback	Samoa	May 2017
(England)	Leon Pryce	Stand off	Retirement	May 2017
