= James Bentley (rugby league) =

Ireland international rugby league footballer

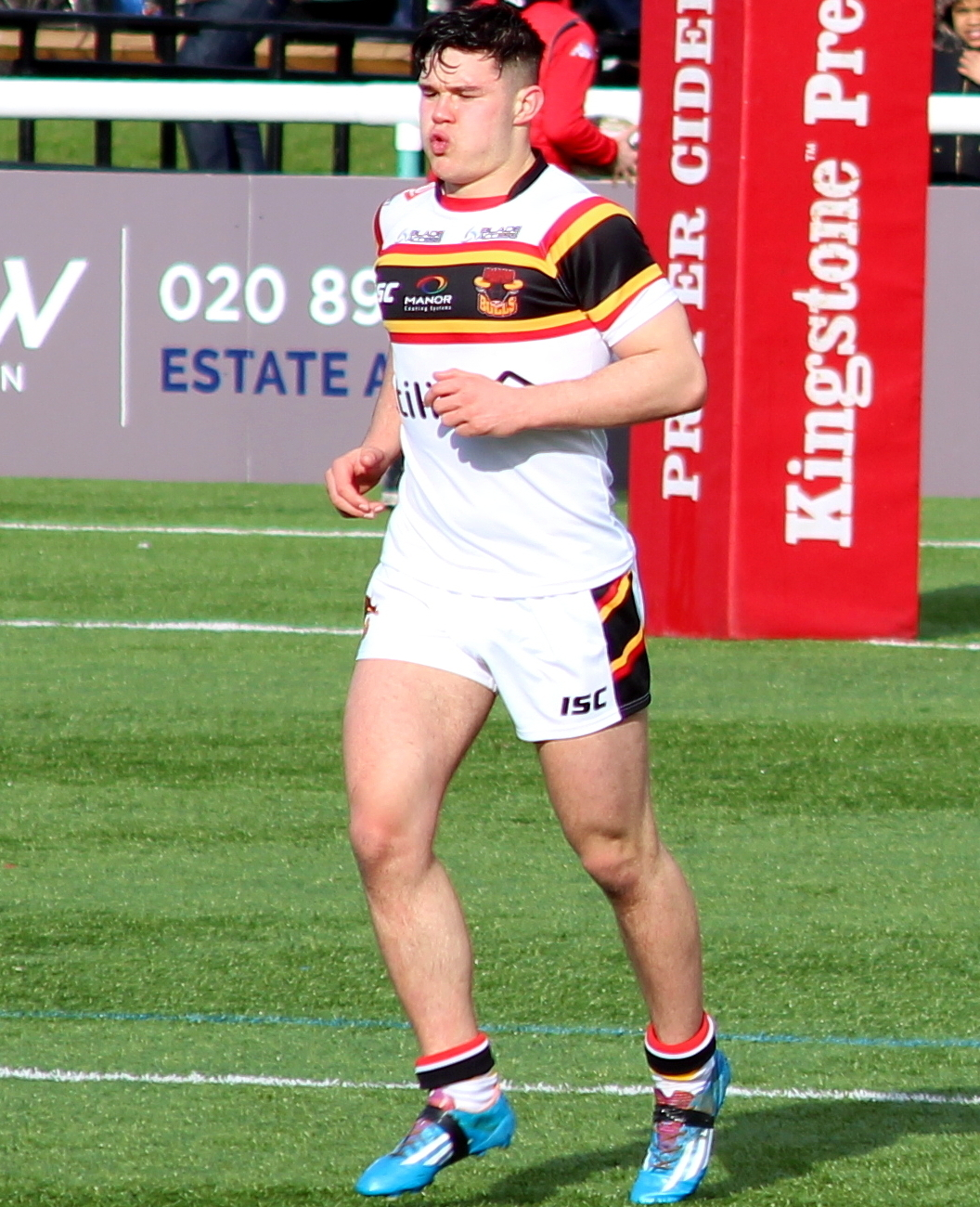

Personal information
- Full name: James Thomas Bentley
- Born: 19 October 1997 (age 29) Leeds, West Yorkshire, England
- Height: 5 ft 9 in (1.75 m)
- Weight: 15 st 0 lb (95 kg)

Playing information
- Position: Second-row, Loose forward, Hooker
Club
Years	Team	Pld	T	G	FG	P
2016–17	Bradford Bulls	28	18	0	0	72
2018–21	St Helens	49	9	0	0	36
2018(DR)	→ Sheffield Eagles	16	3	0	0	12
2019(DR)	→ Leigh Centurions	7	6	0	0	24
2022–25	Leeds Rhinos	81	15	0	0	60
2026	Warrington Wolves	25	5	0	0	20
2027–	Bradford Bulls	0	0	0	0	0
	Total	206	56	0	0	224
Representative
Years	Team	Pld	T	G	FG	P
2018–	Ireland	8	3	0	0	12
- Source: As of 17 November 2026

James Bentley (born 19 October 1997) is an Ireland international rugby league footballer who plays as a second-row, loose forward or hooker for the Bradford Bulls in the Super League.

He played for the Bradford Bulls in the Championship. Bentley played for St Helens in the Super League and spent time on loan from Saints at the Sheffield Eagles and the Leigh Centurions in the Championship.

== Background ==
Bentley was born in Morley, Leeds, West Yorkshire, England.

== Playing career ==
=== Early career ===
Bentley started his path towards a professional Rugby League career at Featherstone Rovers in the scholarship ranks after coming from nearby, Oulton Raiders. After his first season with the club, no game time and a change of coaching staff, he followed the fellow coaching staff to Bradford Bulls.

=== Bradford Bulls ===
Bentley came up through the Bradford Bulls academy and made his initial appearance for the Bradford Bulls in 2016 against the Castleford Tigers in a pre season game and went on to make sporadic appearances throughout 2016. Bentley cemented his place in the Bradford Bulls first team in 2017. Despite the club's 12 point deduction, Bentley impressed scoring 18 tries. After the Bradford Bulls were relegated, Bentley signed for Super League side St. Helens.

=== St Helens ===
At the end of the 2017 season Bentley signed a two-year deal with Super League side St. Helens. He joined the Sheffield Eagles on Rugby League Dual registration in 2018 as part of a deal between the two clubs. He played for Sheffield against the Dewsbury Rams. He played in St Helens 8-4 2020 Super League Grand Final victory over Wigan at the Kingston Communications Stadium in Hull. He signed a one-year contract extension with St Helens for the 2021 season. On 4 May 2021, he was ruled out for an indefinite period after suffering a badly broken leg.

=== Leeds ===
On 21 June 2021, it was reported that he had signed for Leeds in the Super League In round 1 of the 2022 Super League season, Bentley made his club debut for Leeds against Warrington but was sent off after only 16 minutes on the field. On 23 May 2022, Bentley was suspended for three matches in relation to a dangerous high tackle during Leeds victory over Wakefield Trinity. In round 16 of the 2022 Super League season, Bentley was sent to the sin bin for a professional foul during Leeds 42-12 loss against his former club St Helens. In the 2022 Semi-Final, Bentley scored two tries for Leeds in a shock 20-8 victory over Wigan which sent the club into the Grand Final. On 24 September 2022, Bentley played for Leeds in their 24-12 loss to St Helens RFC in the 2022 Super League Grand Final. Bentley represented Ireland at the 2021 Rugby League World Cup and played in all three group stage matches. On 14 November, the Rugby Football League placed Bentley under investigation after he was alleged to have been involved in a fight with England and Sydney Roosters player Victor Radley at England's team hotel. Bentley played a total of 17 games for Leeds in the 2023 Super League season as the club finished 8th on the table and missed the playoffs.

Bentley played 14 matches for Leeds in the 2024 Super League which saw the club finish 8th on the table. On 16 October, Bentley was released from his contract with Leeds due to personal reasons.

=== Warrington Wolves ===
On 30 October 2025, Super League club Warrington Wolves announced that they had signed him on a twelve-month contract. On 3 October 2026, Bentley played in the 2026 Super League Grand Final, which Warrington lost to Wakefield Trinity 23-10.

=== Bradford Bulls (re-join) ===
On 14 August 2026 it was reported that he had signed for Bradford on a three-year deal.

== Statistics ==
Statistics do not include pre-season friendlies.

Season	Appearance	Tries	Goals	F/G	Points
2016 Bradford Bulls	1	0	0	0	0
2017 Bradford Bulls	27	18	0	0	72
Total	28	18	0	0	72
