= Colton Roche =

Ireland international rugby league footballer

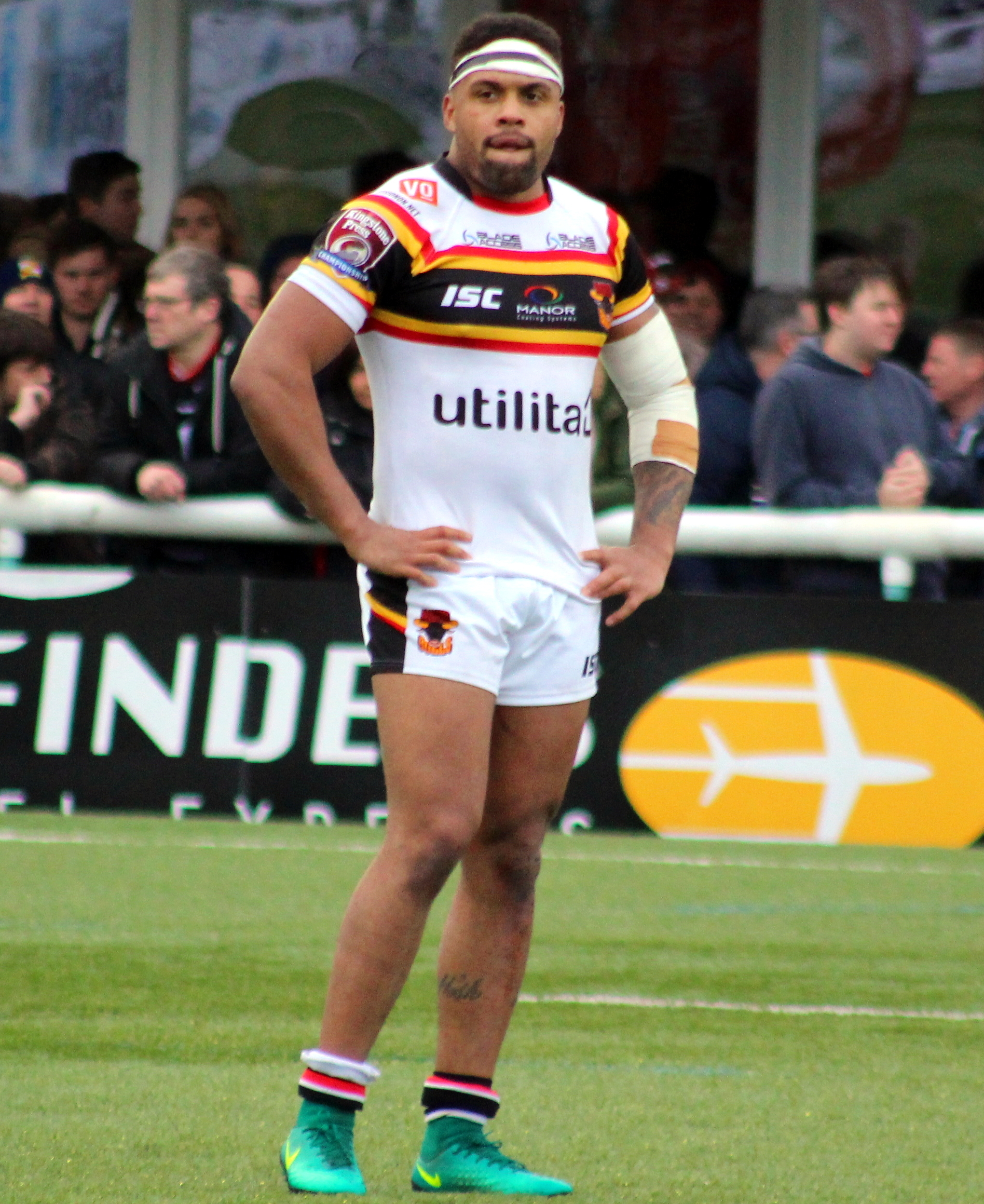

Personal information
- Born: 23 June 1993 (age 33) Leeds, West Yorkshire, England
- Height: 6 ft 0 in (1.83 m)
- Weight: 16 st 0 lb (102 kg)

Playing information
- Position: Prop, Loose forward, Second-row
Club
Years	Team	Pld	T	G	FG	P
2009–12	Leeds Rhinos	0	0	0	0	0
2012	Oldham	2	0	0	0	0
2013	Sheffield Eagles	19	0	0	0	0
2014	Featherstone Rovers	1	0	0	0	0
2014–15	York City Knights	34	5	0	0	20
2016	Featherstone Rovers	17	1	0	0	4
2017	Bradford Bulls	25	3	0	0	12
2018–19	Huddersfield Giants	8	0	0	0	0
2018(loan)	→ York City Knights	5	0	0	0	0
2019(loan)	→ Workington Town	2	0	0	0	0
2019	Bradford Bulls	6	0	0	0	0
2020–21	Newcastle Thunder	3	1	0	0	4
	Total	122	10	0	0	40
Representative
Years	Team	Pld	T	G	FG	P
2012	Ireland	2	0	0	0	0
- Source: As of 1 January 2021

Colton Roche (born 23 June 1993) is an Irish international rugby league footballer who last played as a prop for the Newcastle Thunder in the Championship.

He has previously played for the Huddersfield Giants in the Super League, and Oldham, Bradford Bulls, Workington Town, Featherstone Rovers, Newcastle Thunder and the York City Knights.

== Background ==
Colton was born and brought up in Leeds, West Yorkshire, England.

He played for the Headingley Hawks junior club during his amateur days, representing Yorkshire and England Schools.

== Career ==
Colton signed for Leeds academy in 2009 after impressing through the scholarship squad, adapting to different forward roles and used in the centre. He played for the Leeds academy until the end of the 2012 season.

He was released from Leeds to join the 2012 Championship winners Sheffield Eagles.

Colton was selected to play for Ireland in 2012, qualifying under his mother's nationality. He came off the bench against Scotland and the England Knights.

Colton Represented Ireland in the 2013 Rugby League World Cup

In 2016, he was called up to the Ireland squad for the 2017 Rugby League World Cup European Pool B qualifiers.

== Bradford Bulls ==
2017 - 2017 Season

Roche featured in the pre-season friendlies against Huddersfield Giants and Keighley Cougars. He scored against Keighley Cougars (1 try).

Colton featured in Round 1 (Hull Kingston Rovers) to Round 10 (Halifax) then in Round 12 (Toulouse Olympique) to Round 17 (Featherstone Rovers). He played in Round 19 (Oldham) to Round 20 (Halifax) then in Round 22 (Batley Bulldogs) to Round 23 (Swinton Lions). Colton played in the Championship Shield Game 1 (Toulouse Olympique) to Game 3 (Swinton Lions) then in Game 6 (Dewsbury Rams) to Game 7 (Rochdale Hornets). He scored against London Broncos (1 try), Dewsbury Rams (1 try) and Featherstone Rovers (1 try).

At the end of the season Roche signed with Super League side Huddersfield Giants on a two-year deal.

2019 - 2019 Season

Colton re-signed with the Bulls from Huddersfield Giants on loan.

Roche featured in Round 11 (Barrow Raiders) to Round 12 (Rochdale Hornets) then in Round 14 (Halifax R.L.F.C.) to Round 16 (Batley Bulldogs). He also played in the 2019 RFL 1895 Cup in Round 2 (Barrow Raiders). Roche left the club mid-way through the season.

Statistics do not include pre-season friendlies.

Season	Appearance	Tries	Goals	F/G	Points
2017 Bradford Bulls	25	3	0	0	12
2019 Bradford Bulls	6	0	0	0	0
Total	31	3	0	0	12
