= Rob Roberts (rugby league) =

Wales international rugby league footballer

Personal information
- Full name: Robert Roberts
- Born: 21 June 1978 (age 47) Leeds, England

Playing information
- Position: Prop, Second-row
Club
Years	Team	Pld	T	G	FG	P
1995–98	Keighley Cougars	30	2	3	0	14
1998	Hunslet Hawks	8	0	0	0	0
1999	Hull Sharks	26	4	13	4	46
2000	Halifax Blue Sox	3	0	0	0	0
2001	Hunslet Hawks	11	1	0	5	9
2001	York Wasps	2	0	1	0	2
2001	Keighley Cougars	8	4	5	0	26
2001–02	Huddersfield Giants	35	13	22	0	96
2006–07	Leigh Centurions	29	5	10	0	40
2008–09	Oldham	55	15	0	1	61
2009–10	Barrow Raiders	24	2	0	0	8
2011	Dewsbury Rams	1	0	0	0	0
	Total	232	46	54	10	302
Representative
Years	Team	Pld	T	G	FG	P
2002–07	Wales	8	2	0	0	8

Coaching information
Club
Years	Team	Gms	W	D	L	W%
2017	Hunslet (interim)
- Children: Josh Jordan-Roberts (son)

Robert 'Two Bobs' Roberts (born 21 June 1978) is a former Wales international rugby league footballer who played in the 1990s and 2000s. He played at club level for Hull FC, Huddersfield Giants, Halifax, Hunslet Hawks, Leigh Centurions, Oldham and the Barrow Raiders.

== Background ==
Roberts was born in Leeds, West Yorkshire, England.

== Personal life ==
Roberts' son, Josh Jordan-Roberts, is also a professional rugby league footballer. Also has an daughter. Roberts is the current coach of East Leeds ARLFC open age National Conference Team who he played with in his youth.
