= 2022 Super League Grand Final =

British rugby league championship

St Helens	Leeds Rhinos
24	12
	1	2	Total
STH	12	12	24
LEE	6	6	12
- Date: 24 September 2022
- Stadium: Old Trafford
- Location: Manchester
- Harry Sunderland Trophy: (England) Jonny Lomax ( St Helens)
- Jerusalem: Camilla Kerslake
- Referee: Liam Moore
- Attendance: 60,783

Broadcast partners
- Broadcasters: (United Kingdom) Sky Sports (Australia) Fox League

The 2022 Super League Grand Final was the 25th grand final and championship-deciding rugby league game of Super League XXVII. The match was contested between St Helens and the Leeds Rhinos, for a record fifth time at Old Trafford.

== Background ==
Pos	Team	Pld	W	D	L	PF	PA	PP	Points
1	St Helens	27	21	0	6	674	374	+300	42
5	Leeds Rhinos	27	14	1	12	577	528	+49	29

== Route to the final ==
=== St Helens ===
Round	Opposition	Score
Semi-final	Salford Red Devils (H)	19-12
Key: (H) = Home venue; (A) = Away venue; (N) = Neutral venue.

St Helens ended the regular season as League leaders, thus earning them a bye to the semi-final.

They played the lowest ranked winner of the eliminators, which was Salford.

2 minutes into the match, Salford lost Andy Ackers to a head injury, to which he then failed a HIA, ruling him out for the rest of the game.

The first try of the game came on 14 minutes, with Joe Batchelor touching down to give saints a 4–0 lead. Tommy Makinson converting the try 6–0. Batchelor got his 2nd try of the game 5 minutes later, with Makinson again converting the try to make it 12–0. Saints' Morgan Knowles was then penalised on 24 minutes, for an alleged Chicken wing tackle, to which he was sent to the sin bin for. From the resulting penalty, Kallum Watkins got Salford's first try of the game. Marc Sneyd converted the try 12–6. With less than a minute of the first half remaining, Jonny Lomax kicked a drop goal, to give saints a 13–6 lead at half time. Matty Lees thought he'd scored saints 3rd try on 49 minutes, but it was ruled out for a double movement.

Salford scored again on 61 minutes, as Joe Burgess broke clear down the left, to send Ryan Brierley under the posts, to bring Salford to within 1 point.

Saints scored again on 70 minutes, through Jon Bennison, to give saints a 5 point lead, before Makinson again converted to make it 19–12.

With 5 minutes of the game remaining, Salford were denied a possible penalty try, as Tommy Makinson committed a professional foul, as he pulled back Tim Lafai off the ball, as he was chasing a grubber kick. Makinson was sent to the sin, and the referee did not award a penalty try, as he deemed lafai would not have gotten to the ball in time.

=== Leeds Rhinos ===
Round	Opposition	Score
Elimination Semi-final	Catalans Dragons (A)	10-20
Semi-final	Wigan Warriors (A)	8-20
Key: (H) = Home venue; (A) = Away venue; (N) = Neutral venue.

Leeds finished the regular season in 5th, by beating Castleford Tigers 14–8 on the final day of the season, thus earning them a place in the eliminators.

==== First Eliminator ====
Leeds traveled to Catalans Dragons, in a game which saw 4 cards shown (3 yellow, 1 red). Mitchell Pearce was sent to the bin twice, and Michael McIllorum was also binned for the dragons, with Gil Dudson later sent off, for headbutting Aiden Sezer.

Catalans got the first points of the game on 28 minutes, as Leeds were penalised for offside. Sam Tomkins opted to kick the penalty goal, to which he was successful. Catalans 2-0 Leeds.

Leeds were penalised again for offside on 32 minutes, and Tomkins successfully kicked the penalty, to give the dragons a 4–0 lead.

Leeds got the first try of the game through Liam Sutcliffe, to level the scores at 4-4. Zak Hardaker kicked the conversion, to give Leeds a 6–4 lead.

With 3 minutes of the first half remaining, Sutcliffe scored his, and Leeds' 2nd try, to which was awarded by the video referee. Hardaker once again on target with the conversion, to give Leeds a 12-4 lead going into half time.

3 minutes into the 2nd half, Catalans got their first (and only) try of the game, through Dean Whare, with Tomkins successful with the conversion, to get Catalans to within 2 points.

On 64 minutes, Sutcliffe got his 3rd try of the game, again being awarded by the video referee. Hardaker once again successful with the conversion, to give Leeds an 8 point lead.

With less than 1 minute remaining, Leeds were awarded a penalty, with hardaker once again successful.

Final score: Catalans 10-20 Leeds

==== Semi-final ====
Leeds travelled to Wigan in the semi-final, as the highest ranked winner of the eliminators.

The first try of the game, came on 8 minutes, through Liam Marshall, after he made an acrobatic dive for the corner. The video referee awarded the try, as Marshall did not put a foot in touch before grounding the ball. Harry Smith missed the conversion.

On 19 minutes, Leeds were awarded a scrum, after a knock on from Wigan, but the referee gave a penalty to Wigan, due to interference at the scrum. Smith opted to go for goal, but the kick was wide, and the score remained 4-0.

With 5 minutes of the first half remaining, Leeds were awarded a penalty 10 metres out, to which Zak Hardaker kicked the goal, and bring Leeds back to within 2 points heading into half time.

5 minutes into the 2nd half, Leeds got their first try of the game, through Jarrod O'Connor, with Hardaker successful with the conversion, to give Leeds an 8-4 lead.

3 minutes later, Leeds scored again, with a try from James Bentley. Hardaker successful again with the conversion, to make it 14-4 to Leeds.

Things got worse for Wigan on 51 minutes, as John Bateman was shown a red card, for a late/dangerous tackle on Aiden Sezer, to which he was then required to leave the field for a HIA, before failing to pass the test, which meant he couldn't return.

With 15 minutes of the game remaining, Bentley scored his 2nd try of the game, to send Leeds to their first grand final since 2017, and ended Wigan's 13 match unbeaten home record.

Sam Powell scored a late consolation try for Wigan, but it was too little too late for Wigan.

== Match details ==
24 September 2022
18:00 BST (UTC+01)

St Helens	24–12	Leeds Rhinos
Tries: Lees 3'; Bennison 18'; Hurrell 46'; Percival 58'; Goals: Makinson (4/4) 4', 19', 47', 59'; Penalty: Makinson (0/1)	Report; Report	Tries: Leeming 40'; Martin 72'; Goals: Martin (2/2) 40', 73'

Old Trafford, Manchester
Attendance: 60,783
Referee: Liam Moore
Player of the Match: Jonny Lomax

St Helens		Position	Leeds Rhinos	
22	Jon Bennison 18'	Fullback	16	Richie Myler
2	Tommy Makinson	Wing	20	Tom Briscoe
23	Konrad Hurrell 46'	Centre	33	Zak Hardaker
4	Mark Percival 58' (substituted off) 72'	Centre	4	Liam Sutcliffe
3	Will Hopoate	Wing	5	Ash Handley
1	Jack Welsby	Stand-off	17	Cameron Smith
6	Jonny Lomax	Scrum-half	8	Blake Austin
17	Agnatius Paasi (substituted off) 23'	Prop	8	Mikolaj Oledzki (substituted off) 32', (substituted on) 63', (substituted off) 73'
9	James Roby	Hooker	24	Jarrod O'Connor (substituted off) 49'
10	Matty Lees 3'	Prop	10	Matt Prior (substituted off) 21', (substituted on) 65'
12	Joe Batchelor	Second-row	11	James Bentley
16	Curtis Sironen	Second-row	12	Rhyse Martin 72'
13	Morgan Knowles	Prop	13	Zane Tetevano
11	Sione Mata'utia	Interchange	9	Kruise Leeming (substituted on) 32', 40'
14	Joey Lussick	Interchange	25	James Donaldson (substituted on) 49', (substituted off) 65', (substituted on) 73'
15	Louie McCarthy-Scarsbrook (substituted on) 23'	Interchange	22	Sam Walters (substituted on) 52', (substituted off) 63'
19	Jake Wingfield	Interchange	19	Bodene Thompson (substituted on) 21', (substituted off) 52'
	(Australia) Kristian Woolf	Head coach		(Australia) Rohan Smith
