= Cory Aston =

English rugby league footballer

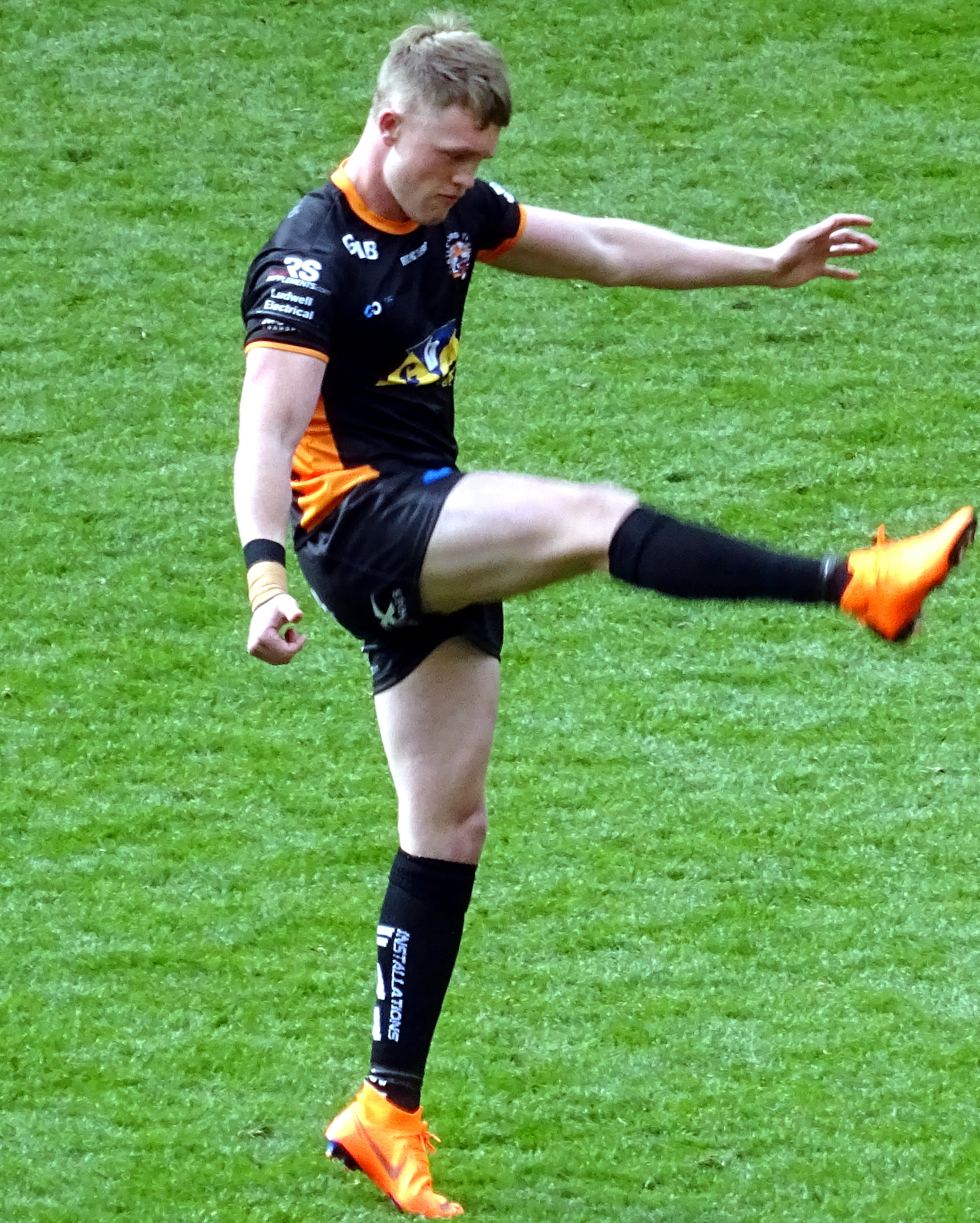

Personal information
- Full name: Cory Aston
- Born: 1 March 1995 (age 31) Sheffield, Yorkshire, England
- Height: 5 ft 10 in (1.78 m)
- Weight: 11 st 13 lb (76 kg)

Playing information
- Position: Scrum-half, Stand-off
Club
Years	Team	Pld	T	G	FG	P
2013–16	Sheffield Eagles	69	31	93	0	310
2017	Leeds Rhinos	0	0	0	0	0
2017(loan)	→ Featherstone Rovers	12	4	49	1	115
2017(loan)	→ Bradford Bulls	10	4	24	0	66
2018–19	Castleford Tigers	9	4	0	0	16
2018(loan)	→ Sheffield Eagles	23	9	28	0	92
2019(loan)	→ Newcastle Thunder	3	3	4	0	20
2020–21	London Broncos	13	3	1	0	14
2022	Halifax Panthers	10	3	0	0	12
2022(loan)	→ Sheffield Eagles	8	2	0	0	8
2023–25	Sheffield Eagles	79	16	276	1	617
2026–	Doncaster	24	10	14	1	69
	Total	260	89	489	3	1339
- Source: As of 14 October 2026
- Father: Mark Aston

Cory Aston (born 1 March 1995) is an English professional rugby league footballer who plays as a stand-off or scrum-half for Doncaster in the Championship.

Aston has previously played for the Sheffield Eagles in the Championship. He moved to the Leeds Rhinos ahead of the 2017 Super League season, and played on loan for Featherstone Rovers and the Bradford Bulls in the Championship. A move to the Castleford Tigers saw his 2018 debut in the Super League, but also loans to his former club Sheffield in the Championship and the Newcastle Thunder during the 2019 League 1 season.

== Background ==
Aston was born in Sheffield, Yorkshire, England.

Aston is the son of Sheffield Eagles head coach Mark Aston.

== Career ==
=== Sheffield Eagles ===
He graduated from the Eagles' academy and made his début in 2013 after signing a five-year deal. He went on to play a total of 61 games for the Eagles, scoring 308 points in the process.

=== Leeds Rhinos ===
Having struggled on and off the pitch in 2016, Sheffield sold Aston to Super League side Leeds Rhinos for £75,000 on a three-year deal, beating off the likes of Wigan and Warrington for his signature. Aston signed a 2-year deal with the Rhinos, the plan was for him to provide cover for Danny McGuire. Aston did not make a single appearance for Leeds in 2017, as he spent most of the season on loan at Featherstone and then Bradford. Ahead of the 2018 season, Aston was released by the Rhinos.

=== Castleford Tigers ===
In December 2017, Aston signed a two-year deal for the 2017 Super League Finalists the Castleford Tigers. In late January, Aston agreed yet another loan deal to the Championship as he rejoined his father in Sheffield. He made his Super League debut in round 11 of the 2019 season vs Wakefield Trinity Wildcats, where he started at scrum-half and scored a try.

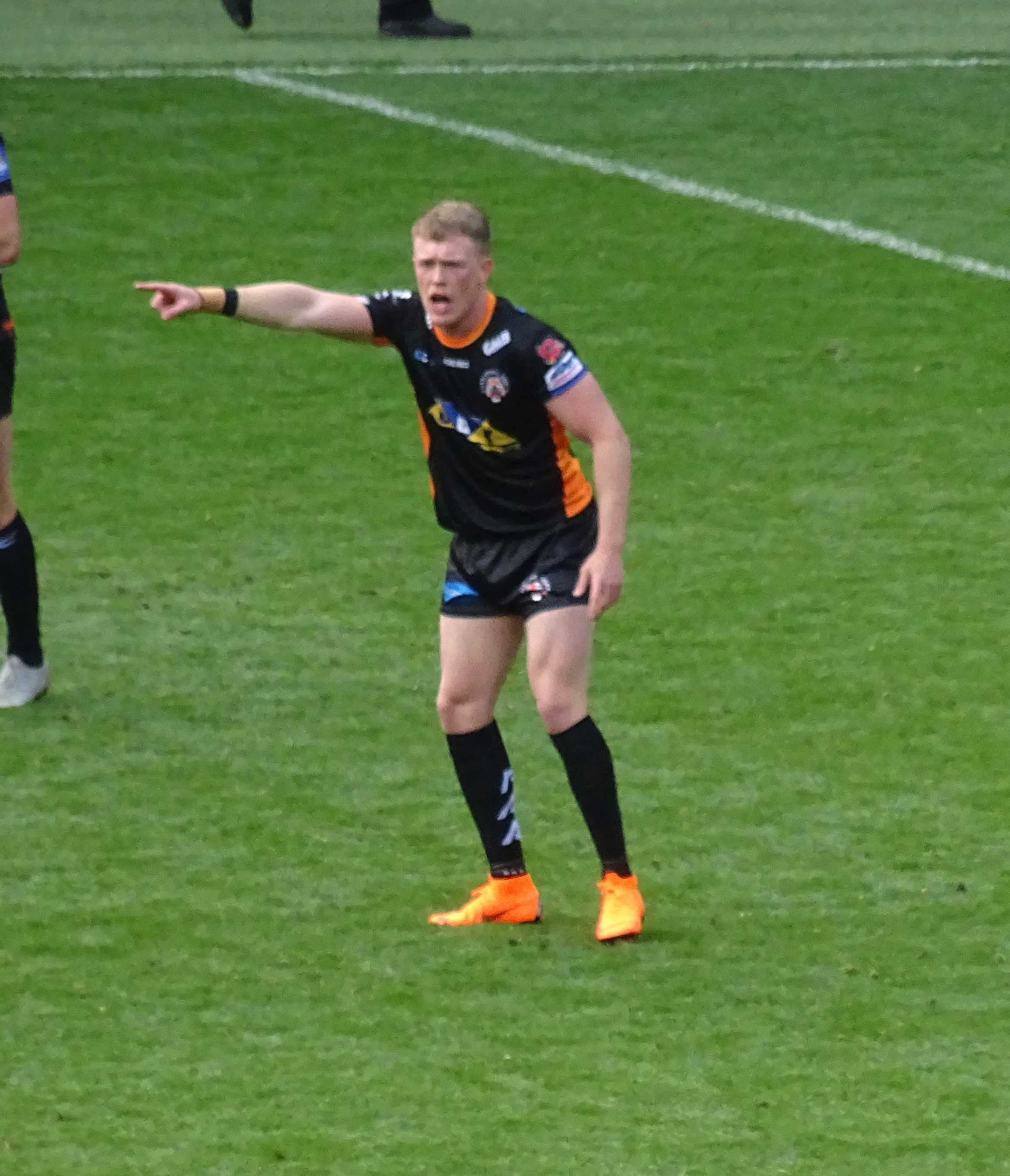
Aston warming up for the Castleford Tigers at Anfield in 2019

=== London Broncos ===
Aston joined the London Broncos ahead of the 2020 RFL Championship season.

=== Halifax Panthers ===
On 29 October 2021 it was reported that he had signed a two-year deal for Halifax Panthers in the RFL Championship In October 2022 it was announced that Aston would depart the club after just a single season.

=== Sheffield Eagles ===
On 23 September 2025 it was reported that he had left Sheffield Eagles

=== Doncaster RLFC ===
On 30 October 2025 it was reported that he had joined Doncaster RLFC on a 2-year deal

== Club statistics ==
Year	Club	Competition	Appearances	Tries	Goals	Drop goals	Points
2013	Sheffield Eagles	Championship	3	2	0	0	8
2014	Sheffield Eagles	Championship	7	3	0	0	12
2015	Sheffield Eagles	Championship	23	8	0	0	32
2016	Sheffield Eagles	Championship	34	15	93	0	246
2017	Leeds Rhinos	Super League	0	0	0	0	0
2017	→ Featherstone Rovers (loan)	Championship	12	4	49	1	115
2017	→ Bradford Bulls (loan)	Championship	10	4	25	0	66
2018	Castleford Tigers	Super League	0	0	0	0	0
2018	→ Sheffield Eagles (loan)	Championship	23	9	28	0	92
2019	Castleford Tigers	Super League	10	4	0	0	16
2019	→ Newcastle Thunder (loan)	League 1	3	3	4	0	20
2020	London Broncos	Championship	6	1	1	0	6
2021	London Broncos	Championship	7	2	0	0	8
2022	Halifax Panthers	Championship	10	3	0	0	12
2022	→ Sheffield Eagles (loan)	Championship	8	2	0	0	8
2023	Sheffield Eagles	Championship	28	9	104	0	244
2024	Sheffield Eagles	Championship	34	4	119	0	254
2025	Sheffield Eagles	Championship	17	3	53	1	119
2026	Doncaster RLFC	Championship	0	0	0	0	0
Club career total			236	79	475	2	1,270
