= Brandan Wilkinson =

Scotland international rugby league footballer

Brandan "Wilko" Wilkinson
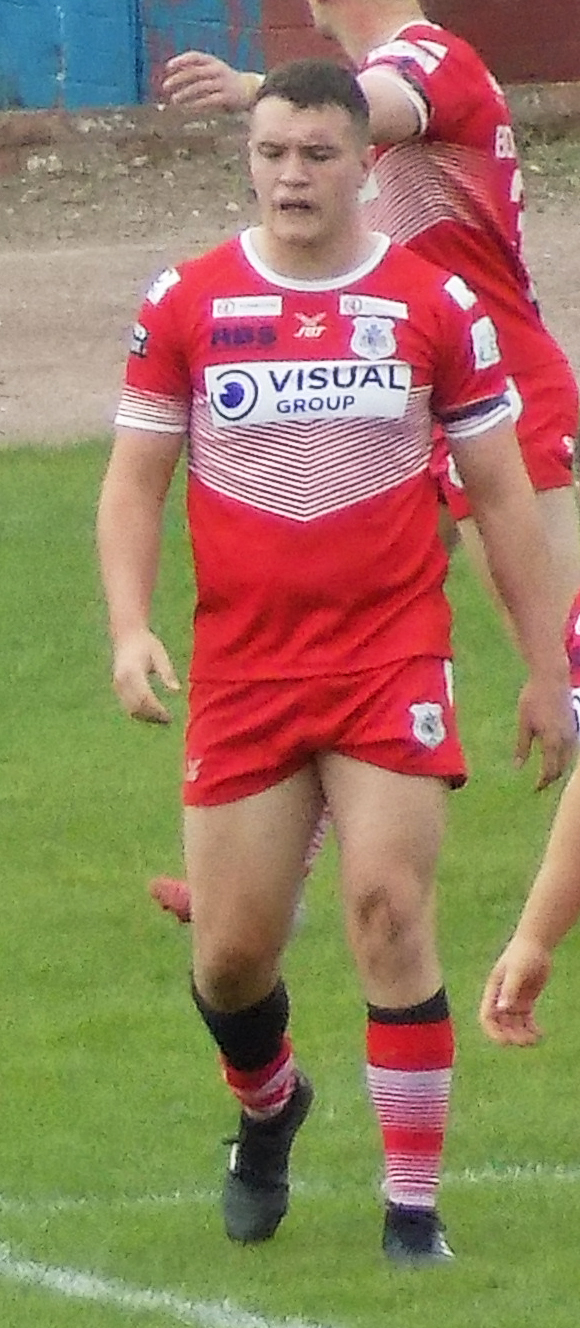

Personal information
- Full name: Brandan Wilkinson
- Born: 7 September 1997 (age 28); Halifax, West Yorkshire, England
- Height: 6 ft 1 in (185 cm)
- Weight: 15 st 8 lb (99 kg)

Playing information
- Position: Loose forward, Second-row, Prop
Club
Years	Team	Pld	T	G	FG	P
2017	Bradford Bulls	17	1	0	0	4
2018–23	Doncaster RLFC	40	3	0	0	12
2024	Hunslet RLFC	1	0	0	0	0
	Total	58	4	0	0	16
Representative
Years	Team	Pld	T	G	FG	P
2017	Scotland	2	0	0	0	0
- Source: As of 1 April 2025

Brandan Wilkinson (born 7 September 1997) is a Scotland international rugby league footballer who last played as a prop, second-row or loose forward for Hunslet RLFC in the RFL League 1.

== Background ==
Wilkinson was born in Halifax, West Yorkshire, England.

He is of Scottish descent.

== Career ==
He has played at representative level for Scotland, and at club level for Bradford Bulls in Championship and Doncaster RLFC in the RFL League 1, as a prop, second-row, or loose forward. He is a product of the Bradford Bulls Academy system.

=== Bradford Bulls ===
2017

Wilkinson featured in the pre-season friendlies against Huddersfield Giants and Keighley Cougars.

Wilkinson featured in Round 1 (Hull Kingston Rovers) to Round 2 (Rochdale Hornets). He then featured in Round 7 (Dewsbury Rams) to Round 12 (Toulouse Olympique). He played in Round 17 (Featherstone Rovers) to Round 18 (Rochdale Hornets) then in Round 21 (Hull Kingston Rovers). Brandan played in the Championship Shield Game 2 (Oldham) to Game 6 (Dewsbury Rams). Wilkinson also played in the 2017 Challenge Cup in Round 4 (Featherstone Rovers). He scored against Dewsbury Rams (1 try).

=== Hunslet RLFC ===
On 3 Nov 2023 it was reported that he had signed for Hunslet RLFC in the RFL League 1.

== Statistics ==
Statistics do not include pre-season friendlies.

Season	Appearance	Tries	Goals	F/G	Points
2017 Bradford Bulls	17	1	0	0	4
Total	17	1	0	0	4
