= Iliess Macani =

English rugby league footballer

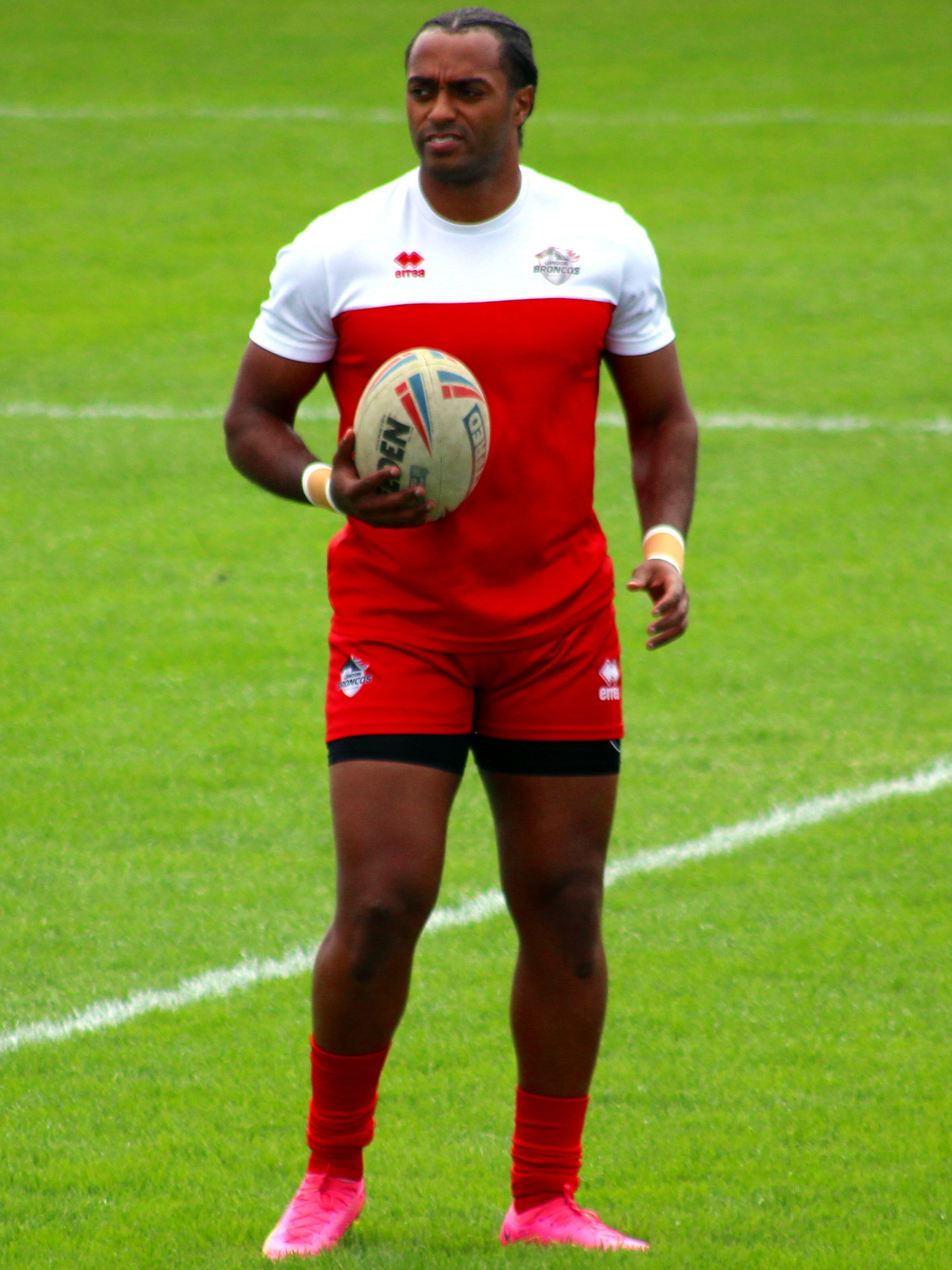

Personal information
- Full name: Iliess Lushombo Macani
- Born: 6 December 1993 (age 32) Tottenham, London, England
- Height: 5 ft 11 in (1.80 m)
- Weight: 14 st 10 lb (93 kg)

Playing information
- Position: Wing, Fullback
Club
Years	Team	Pld	T	G	FG	P
2013–16	London Broncos	68	26	0	0	104
2014(DR)	→ London Skolars	7	4	0	0	16
2017	Bradford Bulls	24	10	0	0	40
2018	Sheffield Eagles	17	8	0	0	32
2018(loan)	→ London Skolars	5	4	0	0	16
2019–21	London Skolars	32	11	0	0	44
2022–24	London Broncos	72	41	0	0	164
	Total	225	104	0	0	416
- Source: As of 14 October 2026

Iliess Macani (born 6 December 1993) is an English rugby league footballer who plays as a winger for the Wests Warriors in the Southern Conference League.

He previously played for the London Broncos in the Super League. Macani came through the London Broncos Scholarship and Academy teams and also played for the London Skolars juniors.

== Background ==
Macani was born in Tottenham, London, England.

== Playing career ==
=== London Broncos ===
Macani made his Super League début for the London Broncos on 9 August 2013 against St Helens scoring a try. He went on to make 1 more appearance that season against Hull Kingston Rovers.

In 2014, Macani made 14 Super League appearances for the London Broncos in 2014 scoring four tries with his standout performance being away at Leeds Rhinos impressing the nation at fullback.

On 4 July 2014, Iliess Macani signed a two-year contract extension with the London Broncos to keep him at the club until the end of the 2016 season.

The 2015 season was Macani's best season to date with the winger playing 28 games and scoring 12 tries.

The 21 year old was rewarded by the head coach, Andrew Henderson with the number 5 shirt for the 2016 season.

=== London Skolars ===
Iliess Macani also featured for his junior club, the London Skolars in the Kingstone Press Championship 1 on dual registration from First:Utility Super League club, London Broncos playing 7 times and scoring 4 tries.

=== Bradford Bulls ===
Iliess Macani signed for the Bradford Bulls. On 3 January 2017, Bradford Bulls were placed into liquidation by administrators and the contracts of players and staff were terminated. However Macani re-signed with the new club.

Iliess featured in the pre-season friendlies against Huddersfield and Keighley.

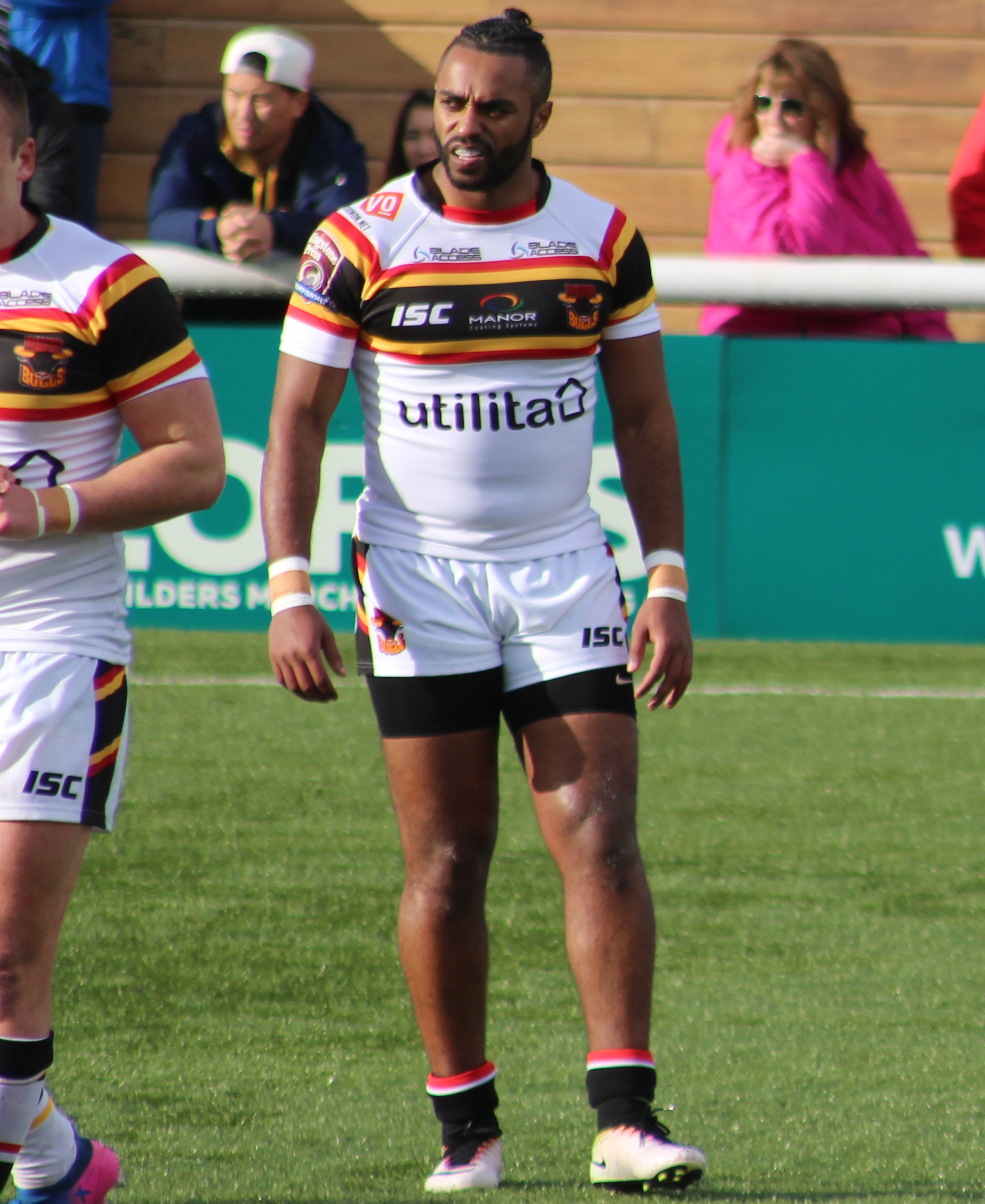
Macani playing for the Bradford Bulls in 2017

Macani went on to featured in 25 games at his time with the Bradford side and scored ten tries during the 2017 Season.

=== Sheffield Eagles ===
At the end of the season he signed a one-year deal with Sheffield Eagles. He was the third signing by the Sheffield outfit ahead of the 2018 season. He featured in the pre-season friendly against Bradford Bulls.

=== London Skolars ===
On 14 October 2019, he confirmed that he had committed to the London Skolars for another year after the loan period ended in 2018. He scored four tries in five games for the Skolars in 2018.

Macani scored 11 tries in 21 games for the Skolars in 2019.

He played in two games for the Skolars, without scoring a try in 2020.

Macani played in nine games for the Skolars, without scoring a try in 2021.

=== London Broncos (re-join) ===
On 15 October 2021, it was reported that he had rejoined the London Broncos in the RFL Championship He scored 15 tries in 28 games for the London outfit in 2022. On 15 October, he played in the London Broncos upset Million Pound Game victory over Toulouse Olympique.
