= Evan Hodgson =

English rugby league footballer

Personal information
- Full name: Evan Hodgson
- Born: 14 September 1998 (age 27) Leeds, West Yorkshire, England
- Height: 5 ft 11 in (1.80 m)
- Weight: 14 st 6 lb (92 kg)

Playing information
- Position: Second-row
Club
| Years | Team | Pld | T | G | FG | P |
|---|---|---|---|---|---|---|
| 2017–20 | Bradford Bulls | 13 | 2 | 0 | 0 | 8 |
| 2019(loan) | → Doncaster | 9 | 0 | 0 | 0 | 0 |
| 2021 | Newcastle Thunder | 3 | 0 | 0 | 0 | 0 |
| 2021–25 | Sheffield Eagles | 100 | 6 | 0 | 0 | 12 |
| 2026– | Batley Bulldogs | 11 | 0 | 0 | 0 | 0 |
| | Total | 136 | 8 | 0 | 0 | 20 |
- Source: As of 6 May 2026

Evan Hodgson (born 14 September 1998) is an English rugby league footballer who plays as a second-row for the Batley Bulldogs in the Championship.

Hodgson has spent time on loan from Bradford at Doncaster in the Championship.

== Background ==
Hodgson was born in Leeds, West Yorkshire, England.

He is a product of the Bradford Bulls Academy system.

== Playing career ==
=== Bradford Bulls ===
In the 2017 Season, Hodgson featured in round 10 Halifax R.L.F.C. to round 13 against Sheffield. Hodgson also featured in the Championship Shield Game 5 Sheffield to Game 7 Rochdale. Hodgson also played in the 2017 Challenge Cup in round 4 against Featherstone. At the end of the season Hodgson signed a three-year contract extension with the Bradford club.

In the 2019 Season, Hodgson featured in round 11 against Barrow. Hodgson played in the 2019 Challenge Cup in round 4 against Keighley. In June 2019, Hodgson joined Doncaster on loan for the rest of the season.

In the 2020 Season, Hodgson played in round 1 the London Broncos to round 3 Featherstone Rovers. Hodgson also featured in the 2020 Challenge Cup in round 5 Wakefield Trinity.

=== Newcastle Thunder ===
At the end of the 2020 season he signed for the Newcastle Thunder.

=== Sheffield Eagles ===
On 10 June 2021, it was reported that he had signed for Sheffield Eagles in the RFL Championship In his five seasons with Sheffield he made 100 appearances for the club.

=== Batley Bulldogs ===
On 9 November 2025, it was reported that he had signed for the Batley Bulldogs in the RFL Championship

== Statistics ==
Statistics do not include pre-season friendlies.

| Season | Appearance | Tries | Goals | F/G | Points |
|---|---|---|---|---|---|
| 2017 Bradford Bulls | 8 | 2 | 0 | 0 | 8 |
| 2018 Bradford Bulls | 0 | 0 | 0 | 0 | 0 |
| 2019 Bradford Bulls | 2 | 0 | 0 | 0 | 0 |
| 2020 Bradford Bulls | 3 | 0 | 0 | 0 | 0 |
| Total | 13 | 2 | 0 | 0 | 8 |
