= Keenen Tomlinson =

Jamaican international rugby league footballer

Personal information
- Full name: Keenen Tomlinson
- Born: 22 May 1997 (age 29) Leeds, West Yorkshire, England
- Height: 6 ft 2 in (1.87 m)
- Weight: 14 st 13 lb (95 kg)

Playing information
- Position: Second-row
Club
Years	Team	Pld	T	G	FG	P
2017	Bradford Bulls	1	0	0	0	0
2017(loan)	→ London Skolars	3	0	0	0	0
2018–20	Batley Bulldogs	40	8	0	0	32
2021–22	Dewsbury Rams	33	4	0	0	16
2023	Keighley Cougars	9	2	0	0	8
2024	Featherstone Rovers	9	1	0	0	4
2024(loan)	→ Hunslet	3	0	0	0	0
2024–25	→ Dewsbury Rams	30	10	0	0	40
2026–	Goole Vikings	15	3	0	0	12
	Total	143	28	0	0	112
Representative
Years	Team	Pld	T	G	FG	P
2016–	Jamaica	11	0	0	0	0
- Source: As of 8 August 2026

Keenen Tomlinson (born 22 May 1997) is a Jamaican international rugby league footballer who plays as a second-row forward for the Goole Vikings in the Betfred Championship.

== Background ==
Tomlinson was born in Leeds, West Yorkshire, England, and is the son of former Keighley Cougars winger, Max Tomlinson. He is of Jamaican descent.

He played rugby union with Moortown as a child before starting to play rugby league for Stanningley.

== Playing career ==
=== Bradford Bulls ===
Tomlinson came through the youth system at the Bradford Bulls, making his debut in the 2017 season.

He spent time on loan from Bradford at the London Skolars in League 1.

=== Batley Bulldogs ===
Tomlinson left the Bulls at the end of 2017 to join the Batley Bulldogs ahead of the 2018 RFL Championship.

=== Dewsbury Rams ===
He joined the Dewsbury Rams ahead of the 2021 RFL Championship. he left the club at the end of the 2022 season.

=== Featherstone Rovers ===
On 26 Jan 2024 it was reported that he had signed for Featherstone Rovers in the RFL Championship on a 1-year deal.

=== Return to Dewsbury Rams ===
In July 2024, Tomlinson re-joined Dewsbury Rams on loan for the rest of the season as part of a swap deal with Featherstone Rovers. Tomlinson re-signed for Dewsbury ahead of the 2025 season.

=== Goole Vikings ===
On 3 October 2025 it was announced that he had joined Goole Vikings for 2026

=== International career ===
Tomlinson made his international debut for Jamaica against Ireland in 2016.

In 2022 he was named in the Jamaica squad for the 2021 Rugby League World Cup.
