= Phoenix Hunapo-Nofoa =

NZ & Samoa dual-code rugby footballer

Personal information
- Full name: Phoenix Hunapo-Nofoa
- Born: 21 August 1994 (age 32)
- Height: 5 ft 9 in (1.75 m)
- Weight: 13 st 2 lb (83 kg)

Playing information

Rugby league
Club
Years	Team	Pld	T	G	FG	P
2017	Bradford Bulls	0	0	0	0	0
2017–	Tweed Heads Seagulls	0	0	0	0	0
	Total	0	0	0	0	0

Rugby union
Representative
Years	Team	Pld	T	G	FG	P
2015	New Zealand Touch
2015–	Samoa 7s
- As of 16 March 2021

Phoenix Tavita Hunapo-Nofoa (born 21 August 1994) is currently playing for Tweed Heads Seagulls.

He is a former Samoan Rugby union and Touch football player. He has previously played for Samoa 7s's sevens team and represented New Zealand in Touch football.

Hunapo-Nofoa played for New Zealand's Touch football team in the Mixed Open category at the 2015 Touch Football World Cup. He made his début for Samoa's sevens team at the 2015 Dubai Sevens. Hunapo-Nofoa made the Warriors development squad after high school.
