= Daniel Murray (rugby league) =

English rugby league footballer

Dan Murray
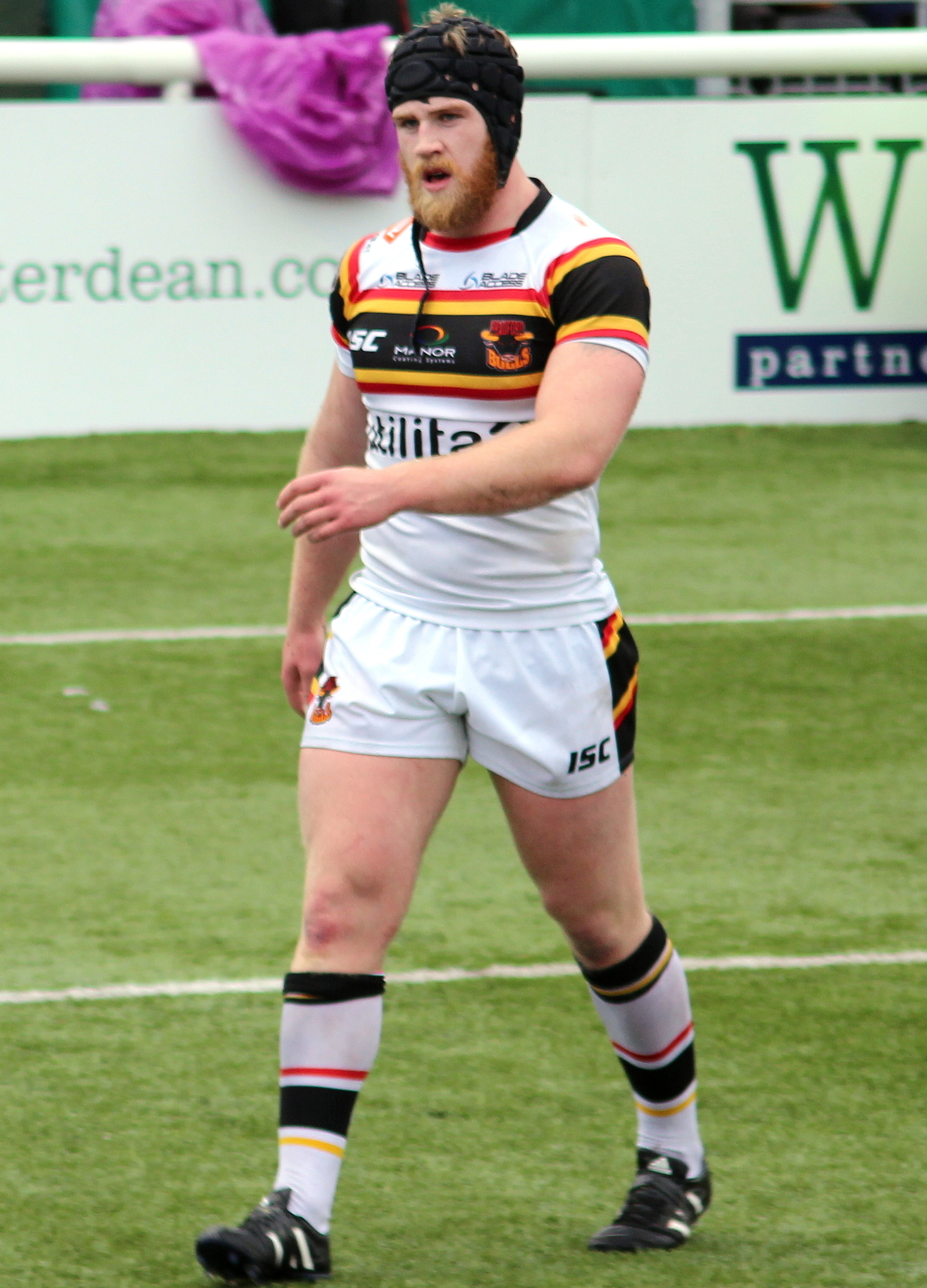

Personal information
- Full name: Daniel Murray
- Born: 21 March 1996 (age 30) Wigan, Greater Manchester, England
- Height: 6 ft 2 in (1.88 m)
- Weight: 16 st 7 lb (105 kg)

Playing information
- Position: Prop
Club
Years	Team	Pld	T	G	FG	P
2016–19	Salford Red Devils	32	2	0	0	8
2016(loan)	→ Rochdale Hornets	4	0	0	0	0
2017(loan)	→ Bradford Bulls	6	2	0	0	8
2017(loan)	→ Halifax	6	1	0	0	4
2018(loan)	→ Halifax	5	2	0	0	8
2018(loan)	→ Oldham	1	0	0	0	0
2019(loan)	→ Hull Kingston Rovers	14	0	0	0	0
2020	Hull Kingston Rovers	14	0	0	0	0
2021–23	Halifax Panthers	48	11	0	0	44
2024–	Widnes Vikings	54	3	0	0	12
	Total	184	21	0	0	84
- Source: As of 4 September 2026

Daniel Murray (born 21 March 1996) is a professional rugby league footballer who plays as a prop forward for the Widnes Vikings in the Championship.

Murray played for the Salford Red Devils in the Super League, and has spent time on loan from Salford at the Rochdale Hornets and Oldham in Kingstone Press League 1, the Bradford Bulls and Halifax in the Championship and Hull Kingston Rovers in the Super League. He has also played for Hull KR on a permanent basis.

== Background ==
Murray was born in Wigan, Greater Manchester, England.

== Playing career ==
=== Bradford ===
He joined Bradford on a loan deal in February 2017.

=== Salford ===
In 2017, he made his début for Salford against Widnes in the Super League. He went onto make seven appearances for the Salford side.

=== Hull KR ===
Murray made 14 appearances for Hull KR.

=== Halifax Panthers ===
On 12 November 2020, it was announced that Murray would join Halifax permanently on a two-year deal from the 2021 season, having spent two previous spells with the West Yorkshire giants on loan and dual registration. He was part of the Panthers side that was 80 minutes from a Grand Final in 2021, narrowly losing out in the semi-finals.

=== Widnes Vikings ===
On 23 Feb 2024 it was reported that he had signed for Widnes Vikings in the RFL Championship on a 2-year deal.
