= Oscar Thomas =

Scotland international rugby league footballer

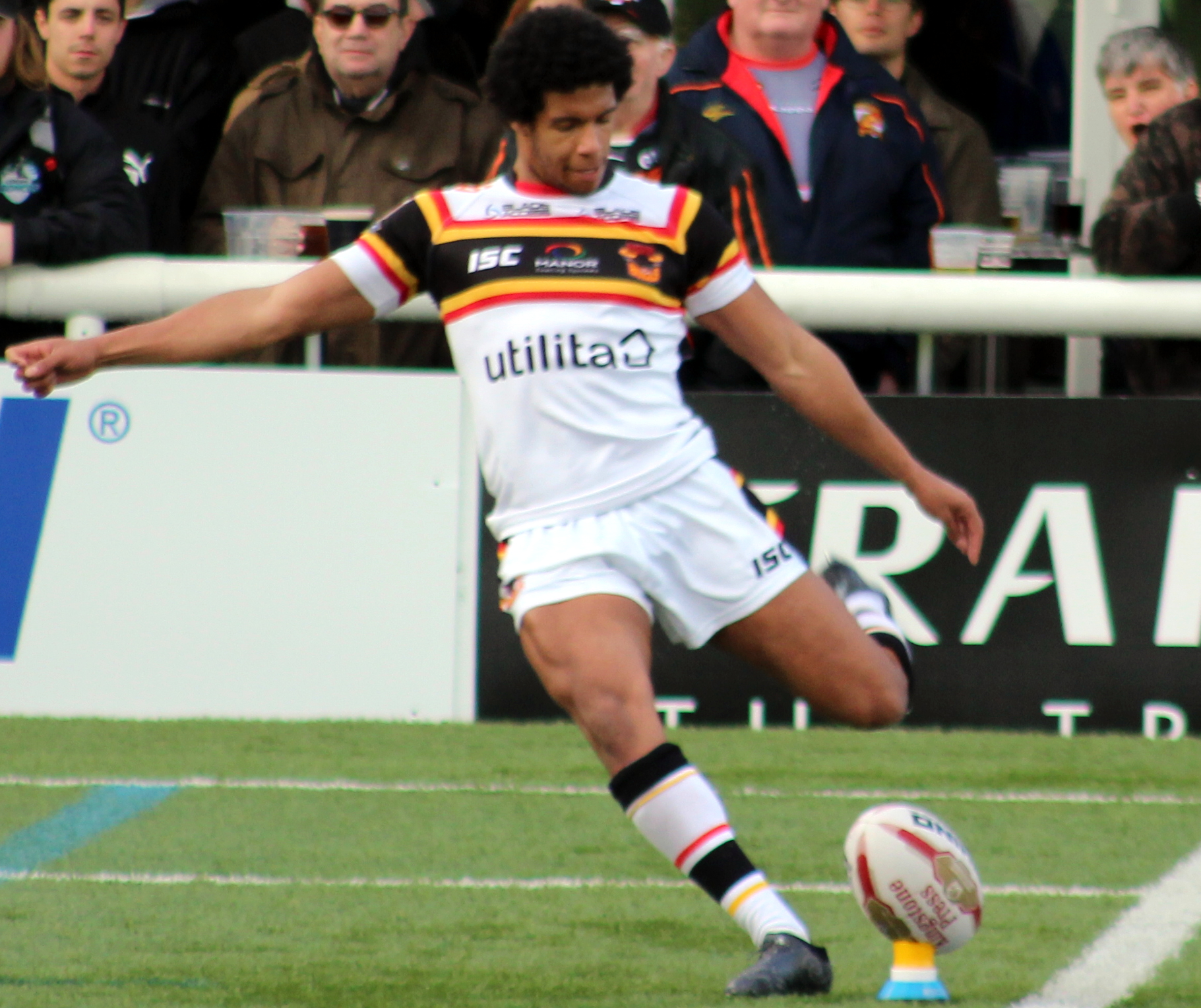

Personal information
- Born: 3 January 1994 (age 32) London, England
- Height: 5 ft 10 in (1.79 m)
- Weight: 14 st 2 lb (90 kg)

Playing information
- Position: Fullback, Stand-off, Scrum-half
Club
Years	Team	Pld	T	G	FG	P
2013–15	London Broncos	22	10	1	1	43
2013(loan)	→ London Skolars	8	3	1	0	14
2015(loan)	→ London Skolars	1	0	1	0	2
2016–17	Bradford Bulls	41	8	67	4	170
2016(loan)	→ London Skolars	6	1	5	0	14
2018	Sheffield Eagles	18	3	22	0	56
2019	Swinton Lions	7	1	13	1	31
2019(loan)	→ Rochdale Hornets	8	0	2	0	4
2020–21	Whitehaven	11	1	0	1	0
2022	Workington Town	24	0	4	0	8
2023–2023	Villeneuve Leopards	1	4	0	0	16
2023(trial)	Newcastle Thunder	2	0	0	1	0
2023–24	Keighley Cougars	8	0	15	0	0
	Total	157	31	131	8	358
Representative
Years	Team	Pld	T	G	FG	P
2014–18	Scotland	11	4	3	0	22
- Source: As of 25 October 2024

Oscar Thomas (born 1994) is a Scotland international rugby league footballer who last played as a stand-off, scrum-half or fullback for Keighley Cougars in the RFL League 1.

Thomas previously played for the London Broncos, London Skolars, Bradford Bulls and the Sheffield Eagles.

== Playing career ==
=== London Broncos ===
Thomas made his Super League début for the London Broncos in 2014, against St. Helens. The game was lost by the Broncos, 16-58. He was named in the starting line-up and played as fullback. He made six appearances during the Broncos' unsuccessful spell in Super League. Thomas continued with the club for one more season in the Championship. He scored ten tries in 16 games before moving away to Odsal.

=== London Skolars loan spells ===
Thomas made his début for the London Skolars in 2013 against West Wales Raiders in the Northern Rail Cup. He scored a try in the 18th minute to make the score 22-0, the game was eventually won by 54 points to 12. Thomas' league début was made in a 26-8 home defeat by Hemel Stags. He played 8 times during this particular loan spell. He also arrived back at the London Skolarstraining ground once more during his time with the Broncos, in 2015. However, he only played against Barrow Raiders, but did kick a goal during a 42-6 defeat. A year later in 2016, Thomas, having joined Bradford Bulls, was loaned to London Skolars. He made six official appearances, scoring one and converting five.

=== Bradford Bulls ===
Thomas signed a 2-year deal with the Bradford Bulls following the 2015 season. He featured in league games against: Swinton Lions, Oldham and Batley Bulldogs. Then after a six-week spell out injured played against his future club Sheffield Eagles, then against Workington Town. He featured in the Round 20 match against Leigh Centurions, a then title dog fight clash. Thomas played in the Challenge Cup 4th Round vs. Dewsbury Rams. He scored against Workington Town (1 try), Swinton Lions (5 points), Sheffield Eagles (5 points), Leigh Centurions (1 goal) and Oldham (16 points).

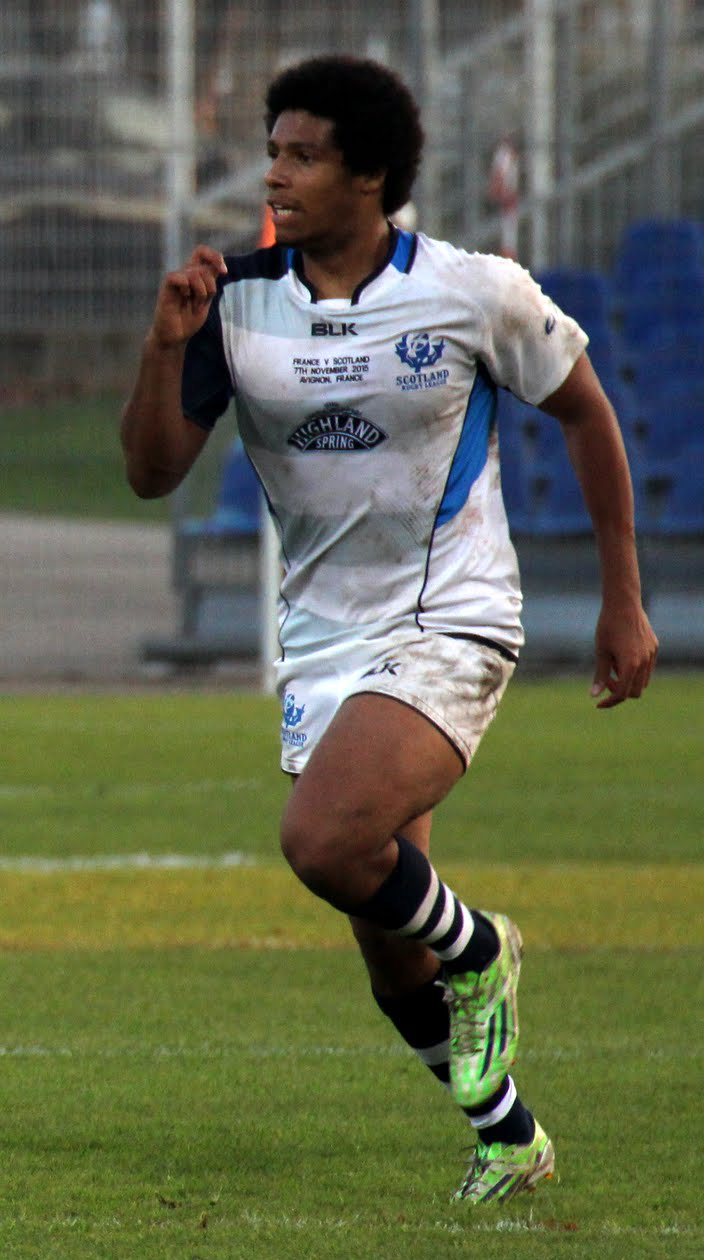
Thomas in action for Scotland

Thomas re-signed with the Bulls for a year following the clubs liquidation. He featured in the pre-season friendly against Keighley Cougars, and scored a try. Thomas went on to feature in Round 1 (Hull Kingston Rovers) to Round 6 (Batley Bulldogs) of the Championship season. He was injured for the two weeks following but returned for Round 9 (Sheffield Eagles). He then played all the way through to Round 22 (Batley Bulldogs). Thomas played in the Championship Shield tie against (Swinton Lions). He scored against Hull Kingston Rovers (8 goals), Rochdale Hornets (16 points), Swinton Lions (15 points), Toulouse Olympique (9 points), London Broncos (4 goals), Batley Bulldogs (20 points), Sheffield Eagles (20 points), Halifax (5 goals), Featherstone Rovers (5 goals), Dewsbury Rams (2 goals) and Oldham (11 points). The back left Bradford after making 41 appearances, scoring eight tries and kicking 67 goals.

=== Sheffield Eagles ===
He was released at the end of the season and subsequently signed for Sheffield Eagles on a one-year deal. He featured in the Eagles' pre-season friendly against his former employers Bradford Bulls where he scored a try and converted upon his return.

=== Workington Town ===
On 30 Nov 2021 it was reported that he had signed for Workington Town in the RFL Championship

=== Keighley Cougars ===
On 24 Jul 2023 it was reported that he had signed for Keighley Cougars in the RFL Championship

== International career ==
Thomas was selected in the Scotland squad for the 2014 European Cup. He started the game against Ireland at fullback which Scotland won 25-4 before featuring in the halves in the 22–38 loss to France. Thomas then started at fullback in the 42–18 win over Wales. He scored a tries against Ireland and Wales.

Thomas was selected for the 2015 European Cup. He started the match against Wales at halfback, scoring a try in an 18–12 loss. He then also featured against Ireland.

Thomas was selected for Scotland in the 2017 Rugby League World Cup. After missing the first game, he featured against New Zealand, and scored a try.

He has made nine official international appearances, scoring on four occasions and kicking three goals. Helping Scotland to 22 points over a three-year period.
