= Josh Jordan-Roberts =

English rugby league footballer (born 1998)

Josh "One Bob" Jordan-Roberts
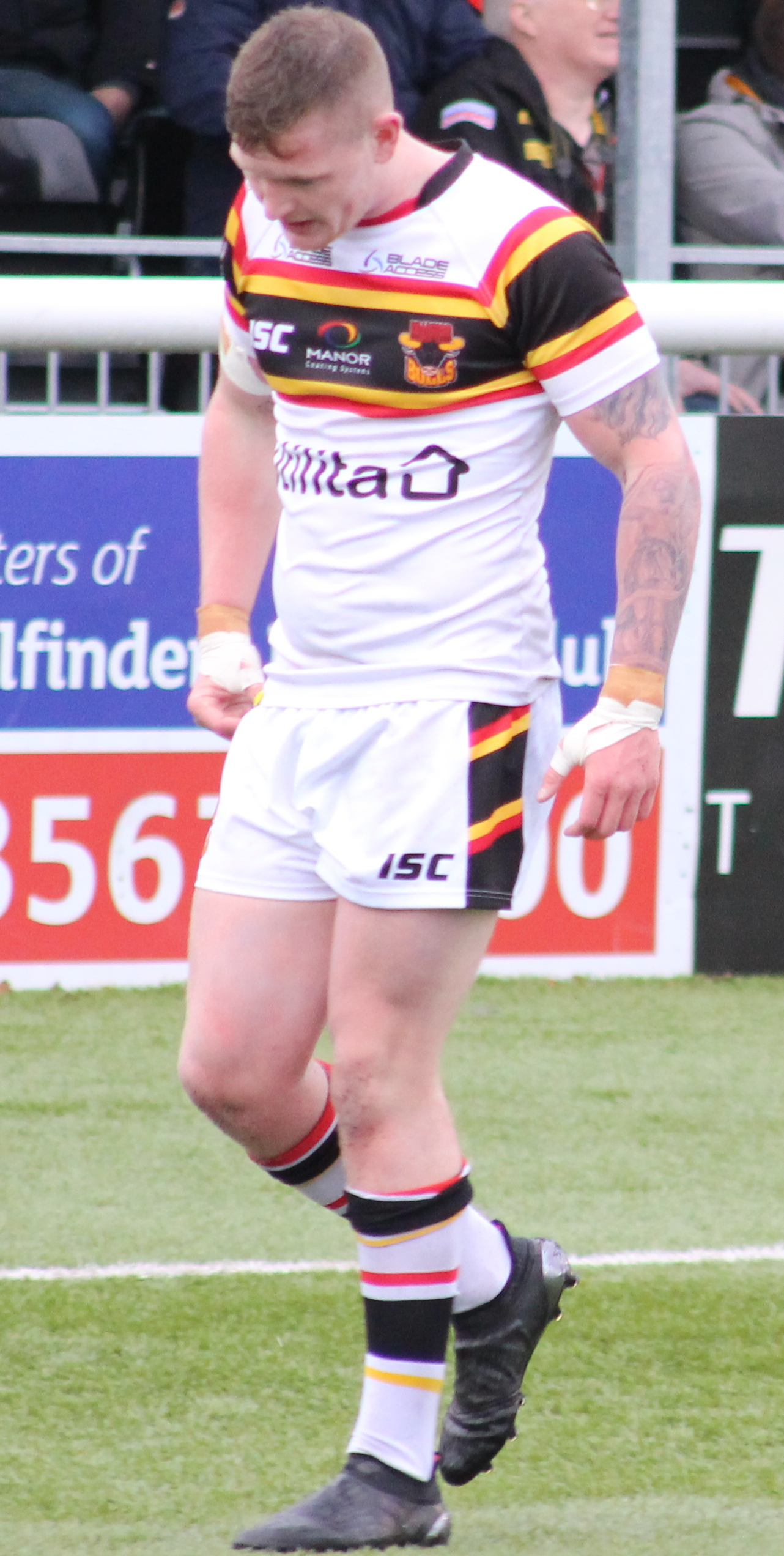

Personal information
- Full name: Joshua Jordan-Roberts
- Born: 26 August 1998 (age 27) Leeds, West Yorkshire, England
- Height: 6 ft 1 in (1.85 m)
- Weight: 16 st 4 lb (103.6 kg)

Playing information
- Position: Second-row, Loose forward
Club
Years	Team	Pld	T	G	FG	P
2016–18	Leeds Rhinos	2	0	0	0	0
2017(loan)	→ Bradford Bulls	7	0	0	0	0
2018(loan)	→ Hunslet	15	1	0	0	4
2018–20	York City Knights	30	6	0	0	24
2021–22	Rochdale Hornets	17	3	25	0	64
2022–24	Hunslet	64	19	1	0	78
2025	Midlands Hurricanes	12	1	0	0	4
	Total	147	30	26	0	174
- Source: As of 26 July 2026
- Father: Rob Roberts

Joshua Jordan-Roberts (born 26 August 1998) is an English former professional rugby league footballer who last played as a second-row and loose forward for Midlands Hurricanes in RFL League 1.

He has played at club level for Oulton Raiders ARLFC, in the Super League for the Leeds Rhinos, for the Bradford Bulls, Hunslet and the York City Knights, as a second-row or loose forward.

== Background ==
Josh Jordan-Roberts was born in Leeds, West Yorkshire, England. He is the son of the rugby league footballer; Rob Roberts (known by the nickname of "Two Bobs").

He was a pupil at Temple Moor High School, Halton, Leeds, he played rugby league for Temple Moor High School in the curtain raiser before the 2010 Challenge Cup Final between the Warrington Wolves and the Leeds Rhinos at Wembley Stadium, London on Saturday 28 August 2010.

=== Bradford Bulls ===
He joined the Bradford Bulls on a loan deal during February 2017.

=== Rochdale Hornets ===
On 13 August 2020 it as announced that Jordan-Roberts would join the Rochdale Hornets from the 2021 season on a two-year deal.

=== Midlands Hurricanes ===
In November 2024, Jordan-Roberts joined Midlands Hurricanes.

On 18 November 2025 it was reported that he had decided to retire at the age of 27, due to a persistent knee injury
