= Cameron Smith (rugby league, born 1998) =

English professional rugby league footballer

Cam Smith
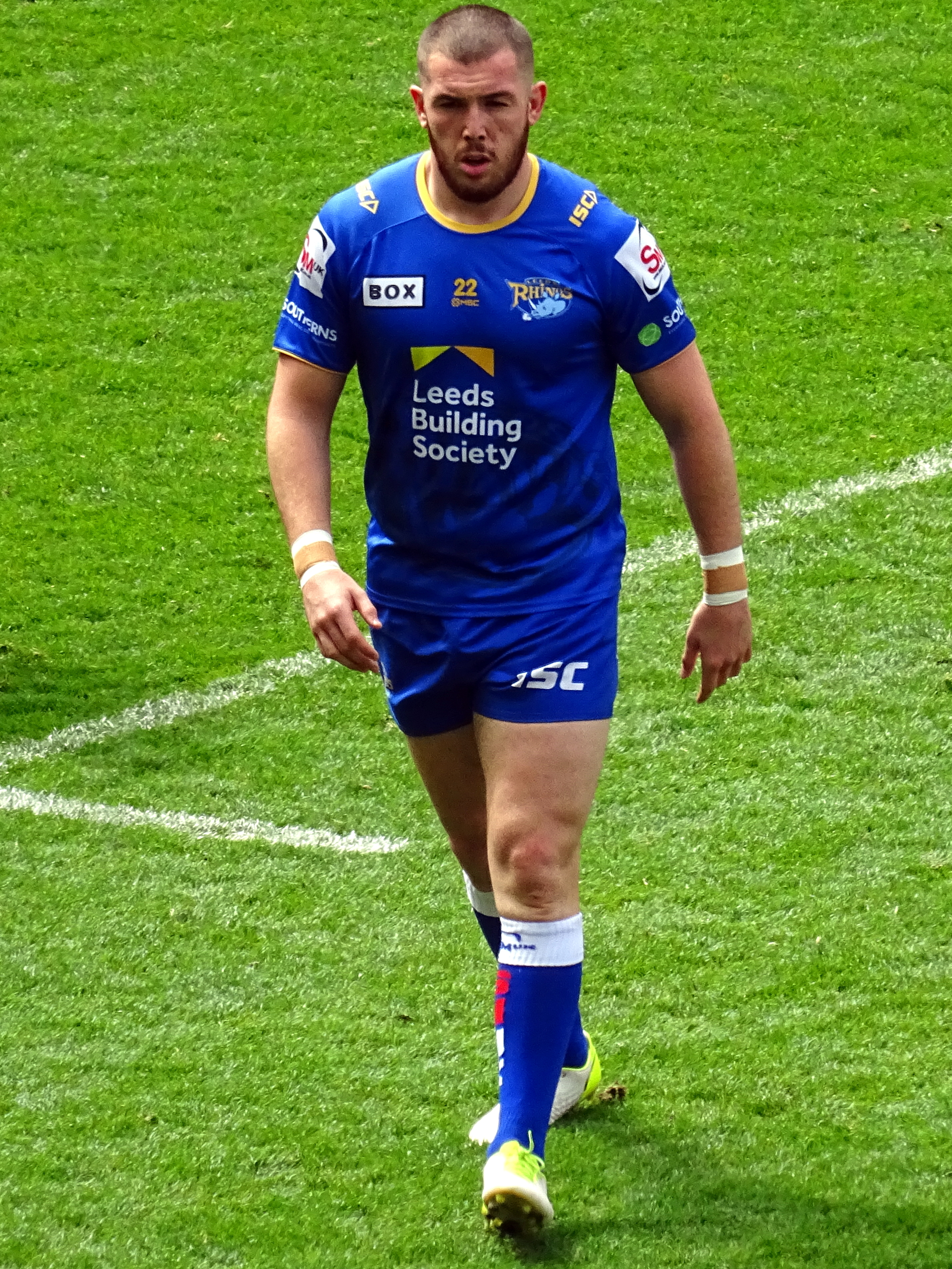

Personal information
- Full name: Cameron Smith
- Born: 7 November 1998 (age 27) Pontefract, West Yorkshire, England
- Height: 6 ft 1 in (1.85 m)
- Weight: 16 st 7 lb (105 kg)

Playing information
- Position: Loose forward, Second-row
Club
Years	Team	Pld	T	G	FG	P
2016–26	Leeds Rhinos	196	28	1	0	114
2017(loan)	→ Bradford Bulls	11	1	0	0	4
2018(loan)	→ Featherstone Rovers	2	0	0	0	0
2019(loan)	→ Featherstone Rovers	3	1	0	0	4
2027–	Wakefield Trinity	0	0	0	0	0
	Total	212	30	1	0	122
Representative
Years	Team	Pld	T	G	FG	P
2019	England Knights	1	0	0	0	0
- Source: As of 6 November 2026
- Education: NEW College, Pontefract
- Relatives: Daniel Smith (brother)

Cameron Smith (born 7 November 1998) is an English professional rugby league player who plays as a loose forward and second-row for the Wakefield Trinity in the Super League and the England Knights at international level.

Smith has spent time on loan from Leeds at the Bradford Bulls and Featherstone Rovers in the Championship.

== Early life ==
Smith was born in Pontefract, West Yorkshire, England. He is the brother of fellow professional player Daniel Smith.

Smith attended Castleford Academy in a period from 2010 - 2015. He then furthered his education at NEW College, Pontefract by taking BTEC Level 3 Extended Diploma in sport. He captained his high school side Castleford Academy to win the National Cup, Yorkshire Cup and the Wakefield district cup.

Smith's youth career saw him play for his local team Castleford Panthers where he made over 60 appearances for the club.

== Playing career ==
=== Leeds Rhinos ===
In 2013 Leeds approached Smith to join their academy team. Smith then went on to take the captaincy band for the Under 16's and England Under 16's.

Smith made his début for Leeds from the interchange bench in their loss against Wakefield Trinity which ended 14-6. He then later featured against the Hunslet Hawks again from the interchange bench in a thrilling 22-18 victory. Smith's latest venture with Leeds was his trip to Florida where he gained another cap against USA Pioneers. On 24 September 2022, Smith played for Leeds in their 24-12 loss to St Helens RFC in the 2022 Super League Grand Final. Smith played 26 games for Leeds in the 2023 Super League season as the club finished 8th on the table and missed the playoffs. Smith featured in 26 matches for Leeds in the 2024 Super League which saw the club finish 8th on the table. Smith was limited to just eleven matches with Leeds in the 2025 Super League season as the club finished 4th on the table.

He was awarded a testimonial year for the 2026 season.In January 2026 it was announced he signed a 4-year deal with Wakefield Trinity.

== International career ==
In 2019 he was selected for the England Knights against Jamaica at Headingley Rugby Stadium.
