= Mikołaj Olędzki =

Polish professional rugby league footballer

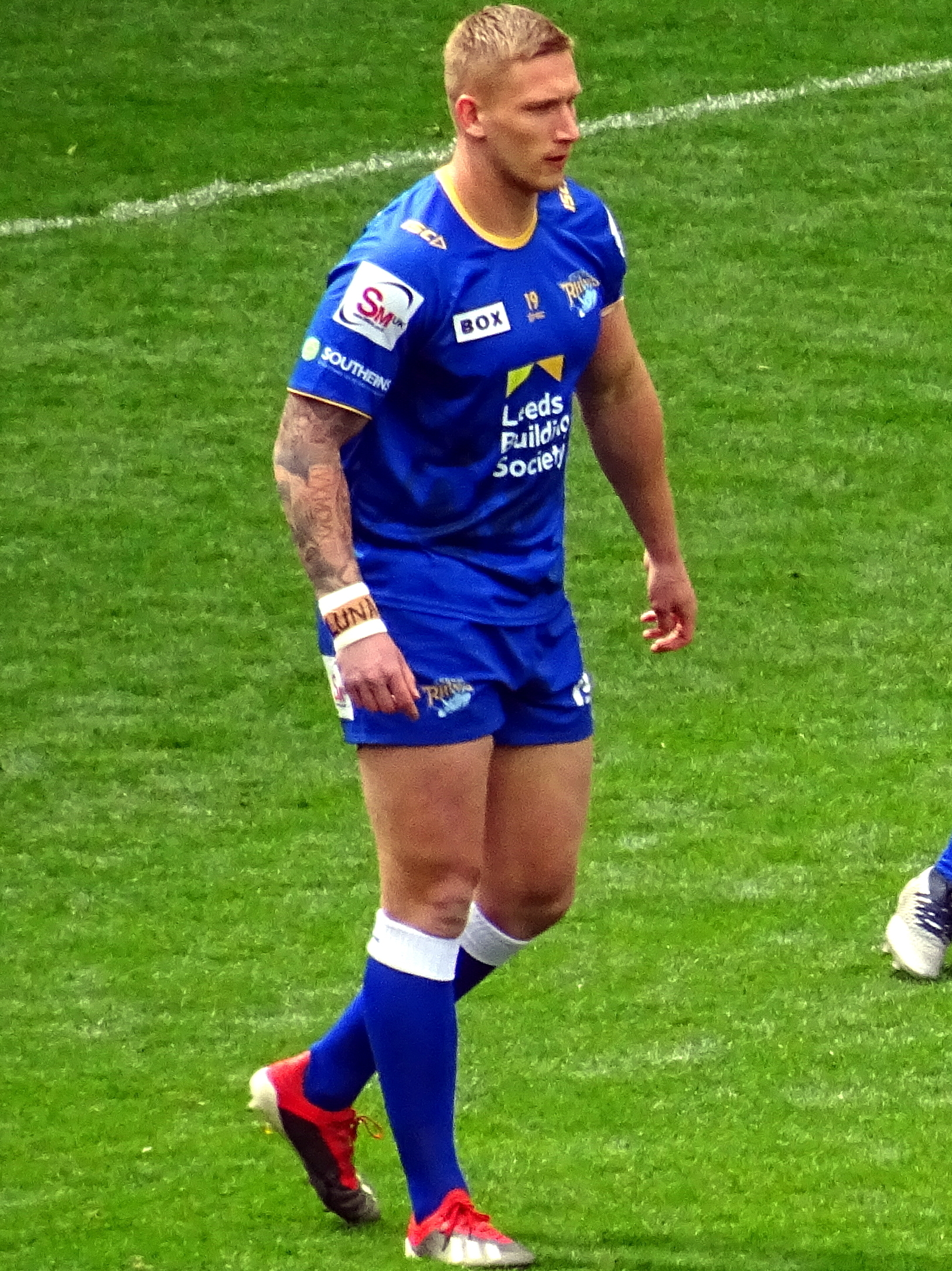

Personal information
- Full name: Mikołaj Olędzki
- Born: 8 November 1998 (age 28) Gdańsk, Poland
- Height: 6 ft 3 in (1.91 m)
- Weight: 17 st 9 lb (112 kg)

Playing information
- Position: Prop
Club
Years	Team	Pld	T	G	FG	P
2017–26	Leeds Rhinos	205	20	0	0	80
2017(loan)	→ Bradford Bulls	20	1	0	0	4
2017(loan)	→ Featherstone Rovers	2	0	0	0	0
2018(loan)	→ Featherstone Rovers	3	0	0	0	0
2027–	Perth Bears	0	0	0	0	0
	Total	230	21	0	0	84
Representative
Years	Team	Pld	T	G	FG	P
2018	England Knights	2	0	0	0	0
2021–25	England	4	0	0	0	0
- Source: As of 20 November 2026

Mikołaj Olędzki (born 8 November 1998) is an England international rugby league footballer who plays as a prop for the Perth Bears in the NRL.

In his early career, Olędzki spent time on loan from Leeds at Bradford Bulls and Featherstone Rovers in the Championship.

== Background ==
Olędzki was born in Gdańsk. He then moved to the UK when he was nine years old. Olędzki's family settled initially in Corby, Northamptonshire. He then began to excel at swimming, appearing for Northamptonshire's county team from a young age. But when they moved closer to his uncle in Leeds, he discovered rugby league.

Olędzki is the second Polish-born player in the Super League, following Grzegorz Kacała in 1996.

== Playing career ==
=== Leeds Rhinos ===
In 2017, he made his début for Leeds against Doncaster in the fifth round of the Challenge Cup, scoring a try in the 63rd minute of a 64–28 win. On 17 October 2020, he played in the 2020 Challenge Cup Final victory for Leeds over Salford at Wembley Stadium. He played a total of 15 games for Leeds in the 2021 Super League season including the club's 36–8 loss against St Helens in the semi-final.

On 24 September 2022, he played for Leeds in their 24-12 loss to St Helens RFC in the 2022 Super League Grand Final. Oledzki was named in the 2022 Betfred Super League Dream Team at prop Olędzki played a total of 21 games for Leeds in the 2023 Super League season as the club finished 8th on the table and missed the playoffs. Olędzki played 21 matches for Leeds in the 2024 Super League which saw the club finish 8th on the table. Olędzki played 22 games for Leeds in the 2025 Super League season as the club finished 4th on the table. He played in the clubs elimination playoff loss against St Helens.

=== Bradford Bulls ===
He joined Bradford on a loan deal in February 2017. He made 20 appearances for the club and scored in the 30–16 win over Swinton Lions.

=== Featherstone Rovers ===
While on a dual-registration Olędzki has played for Featherstone Rovers during the season 2017, and 2018.

=== Perth Bears ===
On March 17, the Perth Bears announced they had signed Olędzki on a three-year deal starting in 2027 as part of their inaugural team to play in the NRL 2027 Season.

== International career ==
In July 2018, he was selected in the England Knights Performance squad. Later that year he was selected for the England Knights on their tour of Papua New Guinea. He played against Papua New Guinea at the Oil Search National Football Stadium.

In 2019, he was selected for the England Knights against Jamaica at Headingley Rugby Stadium.

In October 2021, he made his Test debut for England against France. He was named in England's World Cup squad.

== Personal life ==
He attended Mount St. Mary's Catholic High School in Leeds between 2010 and 2015. He studied at Notre Dame Catholic Sixth Form in Leeds and won their 'Sports Person of the Year Award' for his efforts in the sport of Rugby League with the Leeds Rhinos.

In January 2018, Olędzki announced via Instagram that he and his partner are expecting their first child.
