= 2021 Bradford Bulls season =

- Championship Rank: 5th
- Play-off result: Elimination Playoff
- Challenge Cup: 1st Round
- 2021 record: Wins: 12; draws: 0; losses: 9
- Points scored: For: 514; against: 501

Team information
- Chairman: Mark Sawyer
- Head Coach: John Kear
- Captain: Steve Crossley
- Stadium: Odsal Stadium
- High attendance: 3,742 vs. York City Knights

Top scorers
- Tries: Joe Brown (10)
- Goals: Danny Brough (48)
- Points: Danny Brough (109)
← 2020	List of seasons	2022 →

This article details the Bradford Bulls rugby league football club's 2021 season. This is the Bulls' third consecutive season in the Championship.

== Season review ==
=== June 2020 ===
The preparation for the 2021 season started with the re-signing of experienced coach John Kear on a two-year extension which would keep him at the Bradford Bulls until the end of the 2022 season. Following this news, the Bulls announced that Super League veteran halfback Danny Brough would join the club on a 2-year deal from Wakefield Trinity linking up with John Kear for a third time.

=== July 2020 ===
Vice captain Sam Hallas and homegrown fullback Brandon Pickersgill both signed one year deals to stay at the club for the 2021 season. Winger Joe Brown also signed an extension to stay with the Bulls.

=== August 2020 ===
Due to the reserves being suspended until 2022 young halfback Cobi Green signed for Swinton Lions. Soon after Green's departure the Bulls announced the re-signing of second-row forwards Brad Gallagher and Ebon Scurr, Gallagher signed a two-year extension whilst Scurr signed for one year. French prop forward Levy Nzoungou also signed a one-year extension to his contract. Young hooker Thomas Doyle was the next player to sign an extension with the Bulls, signing on for another season. Luke Littlewood was the next player to leave the club due to no reserve grade for 2021, the young halfback signed for RFL League 1 side Rochdale Hornets, coached by former Bull Matt Calland. Bradford announced their second signing for the new season in the form of Huddersfield Giants second rower Aaron Murphy who signed a two-year deal with the club.

=== September 2020 ===
The month started with the news that winger Matty Dawson-Jones had taken up the option in his contract to stay an extra year at the Bulls after finishing last year's cancelled season as Bradford's top try scorer. However last season's top point scorer Rowan Milnes was called back to his parent club Hull Kingston Rovers thus terminating his loan with the Bulls. Winger David Foggin-Johnston signed an extension to his contract to keep him at the Bulls until the end of 2021. Second row forward Connor Farrell announced his retirement from the sport due to ongoing injuries. Following this news the Bulls signed Doncaster R.L.F.C. second rower Brad England on a one-year deal. Pack members Anthony England and George Flanagan both signed extensions with the club, prop forward England signed a two-year deal whilst hooker Flanagan signed a one-year deal. Second rower Adam Rooks who was at the club on loan last season from Hull KR put pen to paper on a one-year permanent deal. Former Bulls centre Rhys Evans signed a two-year deal with the club following a short stint at Leeds Rhinos.

=== October 2020 ===
There was positive news to start the month as the Bulls announced that they had retained reserve grade players Matthew Race, Cameron Berry and Bradley Ho for the 2021 season. The fourth reserve grade player to sign up for the new season was centre/second row Sam Smith. It was announced that homegrown prop forward Liam Kirk had signed for fellow Championship side Oldham R.L.F.C. ending his 5-year stint at the club. Another young reserve grade player in winger Murphy Smith signed up to the 2021 squad by signing a one-year deal.

=== November 2020 ===
The Bulls revealed that the new kit supplier for the next two years would be Steeden after spending the last two seasons with Kappa. The sixth new signing for the upcoming season was the former England Youth international wing/centre Reece Hamlett who signed a one-year deal with the club from Super League side Warrington Wolves. Another young reserve grade player in Billy Jowitt was retained by the club for the 2021 season. Following the decision to expel Toronto Wolfpack from the Super League the Bulls announced that they would be applying for the 12th place in the 2021 Super League season along with the likes of Leigh Centurions, Featherstone Rovers, Toulouse Olympique and York City Knights. Chairman Mark Sawyer stated that a return to Odsal Stadium would be a key factor in applying for the Super League. Highly rated young Hull Kingston Rovers winger Elliot Wallis signed for Bradford on a year long loan deal in order to gain some first team experience. Former prop forward Dan Fleming who was at the club in 2015 and 2016 signed a one-year deal after a short stint at Castleford Tigers.

=== December 2020 ===
Young homegrown second rower Evan Hodgson signed for RFL League 1 side Newcastle Thunder. The Bulls application to Super League XXVI was not a success as Leigh Centurions were selected to be the 12th side for the 2021 Super League season. Bradford also released their away kit which consists on Black and Red vertical stripes.

=== January 2021 ===
There was no news in January.

=== February 2021 ===
The Bulls announced that they would play local League 1 side Keighley Cougars in a friendly in order to prepare for the 2021 season. Following this, the first round of the 2021 Challenge Cup was drawn with the Bulls travelling to Featherstone Rovers, the winners of the tie would then face either Halifax Panthers or Batley Bulldogs in the second round. Bradford announced their 2021 squad numbers with veteran new signing Danny Brough taking the number 6 shirt with Aaron Murphy wearing the number 12. The Bulls revealed they would play one more friendly against Swinton Lions before the season begun.

=== March 2021 ===
Bradford's 2021 campaign started with a 22–26 loss in the first pre-season friendly against Swinton Lions, first half tries from Brandon Pickersgill and Ross Oakes with two conversions from Danny Brough gave the Bulls a 12–6 lead at half time however further tries from George Flanagan and Matty Dawson-Jones could not prevent a loss. The Bulls announced the signing of 22-year-old wing/centre Jack Sanderson from Castleford Tigers on a one-year deal, Sanderson will wear the squad number 25 for the upcoming season. Bradford finished their pre-season off with an unconvincing 22–18 win over local rivals Keighley Cougars, tries came from Thomas Doyle, Danny Brough, Ross Oakes and Anthony Walker. Trialist Anthony Walker earned himself a permanent contract with the Bulls after impressing during the pre-season. Bradford's first competitive match in 373 days ended in a 41–16 defeat to Featherstone Rovers in the first round in the 2021 Challenge Cup. Following this defeat it was announced that the Bulls had signed former loanee Ben Evans from Toulouse Olympique in order to bolster the options in the front row.

=== April 2021 ===
Prop forward Anthony England announced his retirement from the sport at the age of 34 due to ongoing injuries. The opening game of the Championship season saw the Bulls on the end of a 50–12 defeat to the Sheffield Eagles. Super League side Hull Kingston Rovers announced that Elliot Wallis would be returning to the club after a short loan spell with the Bulls. Bradford won their first game of the season in a hard-fought 27–26 victory over local rivals Halifax Panthers, halfback Jordan Lilley kicked a late drop goal to ensure the win for the Bulls. Young prop forward Bradley Ho was granted a season long loan move to RFL League 1 side Coventry Bears. The Bulls made it back to back wins with a comprehensive 35–14 win over ground sharing side Dewsbury Rams, halfback Brough made his 500th career appearance and marked the occasion with a try and a drop goal.

=== May 2021 ===
Bradford kept their winning streak going with a difficult trip to Whitehaven R.L.F.C. as they came out 30–22 winners. Captain Steve Crossley led the way with two tries whilst Joe Brown, Brandon Pickersgill and Ebon Scurr all scoring as well. The Bulls made it four wins in five with a tense 23–22 win over Swinton Lions. Danny Brough, Thomas Doyle, David Foggin-Johnston and Pickersgill all scored tries whilst Jordan Lilley secured the game winning drop goal. The scheduled game against Newcastle Thunder was rearranged to ensure that fans could attend as the government prepared to ease lockdown rules. The Bulls announced the permanent signing of former player Elliot Kear from Super League side Salford Red Devils as Kear wished to go part-time in order to train to be a fireman. Long serving Football Manager Stuart Duffy announced his retirement after 23 years in the role after suffering a bout of ill health. Young centre Joe Burton signed a 1 1/2-year professional deal with the club. Bradford announced the loan signing of Warrington Wolves forward Ellis Robson for a two-week period, meanwhile the Bulls also revealed they had signed Hull F.C. back Mitieli Vulikijapani on a two-week loan. During this month the Rugby Football League announced that along with Castleford Tigers and Hull Kingston Rovers the Bulls would not be granted an elite academy license after this season. 300 travelling fans saw the Bulls beat London Broncos 33–8 in the capital with loan signing Robson the stand out player scoring two tries. Academy product Oliver Wilson and fullback Ashton Golding both signed two-week loan deals with the Bulls from Super League side Huddersfield Giants. New centre Reece Hamlett signed with Swinton Lions on a loan deal. After spending a year and a half at Crown Flatt, the Bulls made their long-awaited return to their home Odsal Stadium with a dominant 37–18 win against rivals York City Knights, youngster Joe Brown led the way with two tries but Danny Brough's eight goals sealed the win.

=== June 2021 ===
The upcoming match against Toulouse Olympique was cancelled due to travel restrictions from France regarding the ongoing COVID-19 pandemic. The Rugby Football League announced that the Bulls were granted a probationary elite license for their academy for a two-year period, renegading on their decision to take that license away. Bradford made it seven wins a row with a 31–12 victory over newly promoted Newcastle Thunder, Steve Crossley, Thomas Doyle, Jordan Lilley, Ellis Robson and Anthony Walker all scored tries for the Bulls whilst Lilley and Danny Brough kicked 5 goals between them. However the Bulls suffered a serious blow as star halfback Brough was ruled out for 12–14 weeks with a bicep injury. Loan signing Mitieli Vulikijapani was recalled by parent club Hull F.C. due to injury problems. Huddersfield Giants also recalled Ashton Golding and Oliver Wilson due to a number of positive Covid tests in their squad. The Bulls winning streak came to an end as the injury hit Bulls were ruthlessly taken apart by unbeaten Featherstone Rovers in a 44–0 riot. Young forward Ethan O'Hanlon was loaned out to League 1 side North Wales Crusaders. Warrington Wolves recalled second rower Ellis Robson as their squad was depleted due to the England vs Combined All Stars match. With the injury to Brough, the Bulls announced the loan signing of former halfback Joe Keyes on a 2-week deal from Hull Kingston Rovers. The Bulls suffered back to back defeats for the first time this season as they lost 25–12 to Widnes Vikings, youngster Scurr and prop Walker scored the tries for Bradford.

=== July 2021 ===
Bradford got back to winning ways with a hard-fought 30–16 win over 3rd placed Batley Bulldogs however they lost halfback Jordan Lilley to a rib injury. After the victory over Batley the Bulls announced that the loan deal for scrum half Joe Keyes was extended on a week by week basis. The following week Bradford were ruthless as they dismantled Oldham R.L.F.C. in a 54–22 thrashing, Keyes was the man of the match with a hat-trick of tries and nine goals in a 30-point haul. Young halfback Matthew Race was sent on loan to North Wales Crusaders in order to gain some first team experience. Once again Hull Kingston Rovers allowed halfback Keyes to stay with the Bulls for an extra month following some good performances. In what could be described as the game of the season so far the Bulls fell agonizingly short to the unbeaten Featherstone Rovers in a thrilling 30–36 loss which was only settled by a late Dane Chisholm interception. The Bulls announced that they had signed former loanee and current York City Knights player Jordan Baldwinson one a one-week loan deal.

== Milestones ==
- CCR1: Reece Hamlett, Jack Sanderson, Danny Brough, Brad England and Anthony Walker made their debuts for the Bulls.
- CCR1: Reece Hamlett and Ebon Scurr scored their 1st try for the Bulls.
- CCR1: Danny Brough kicked his 1st goal for the Bulls.
- Round 1: Aaron Murphy and Billy Jowitt made their debuts for the Bulls.
- Round 1: Joe Brown scored his 1st try for the Bulls.
- Round 2: Daniel Fleming scored his 1st try for the Bulls.
- Round 3: Danny Brough and Brad England scored their 1st try for the Bulls.
- Round 3: Ross Oakes scored his 25th try and reached 100 points for the Bulls.
- Round 3: Danny Brough kicked his 1st drop goal for the Bulls.
- Round 4: Brandon Pickersgill scored his 25th try and reached 100 points for the Bulls.
- Round 5: Joe Burton made his debut for the Bulls.
- Round 7: Mitieli Vulikijapani and Ellis Robson made their debuts for the Bulls.
- Round 7: Ellis Robson and Aaron Murphy scored their 1st try for the Bulls.
- Round 8: Ashton Golding made his debut for the Bulls.
- Round 8: Ashton Golding scored his 1st try for the Bulls.
- Round 6: Anthony Walker scored his 1st try for the Bulls.
- Round 6: Jordan Lilley reached 100 points for the Bulls.
- Round 12: Joe Burton scored his 1st try for the Bulls.
- Round 13: Joe Keyes scored his 25th try for the Bulls.
- Round 14: George Flanagan kicked his 1st goal for the Bulls.
- Round 15: Sam Hallas kicked his 1st goal for the Bulls.
- Round 15: George Flanagan kicked his 1st drop goal for the Bulls.
- Round 17: George Flanagan made his 50th appearance for the Bulls.
- Round 18: Bradley Ho made his debut for the Bulls.
- Round 18: George Flanagan scored his 25th try and reached 100 points for the Bulls.
- Round 19: Masimbaashe Matongo made his debut for the Bulls.
- Round 19: Rhys Evans scored his 1st hat-trick for the Bulls.
- Round 19: Danny Brough reached 100 points for the Bulls.
- Round 20: Ethan O'Hanlon made his debut for the Bulls.
- Round 21: Eldon Myers made his debut for the Bulls.
- Round 22: Sam Hallas made his 100th appearance for the Bulls.

== Pre-season friendlies ==
LEGEND
Win
Draw
Loss

Bulls' score is first.

Date	Competition	Vrs	H/A	Venue	Result	Score	Tries	Goals	Att	Report
6 March 2021	Pre Season	Swinton Lions	H	Crown Flatt	L	22-26	Dawson-Jones, Flanagan, Oakes, Pickersgill	Brough 2/2, Jowitt 1/2	—	Report
13 March 2021	Pre Season	Keighley Cougars	H	Crown Flatt	W	22-18	Brough, Doyle, Oakes, Walker	Brough 2/2, Jowitt 1/2	—	Report

== Player appearances ==
- Friendly games only

FB=Fullback	C=Centre	W=Winger	SO=Stand Off	SH=Scrum half	P=Prop	H=Hooker	SR=Second Row	LF=Loose forward	B=Bench

No	Player	1	2
1	Brandon Pickersgill	FB	FB
2	Joe Brown	W	SO
3	Rhys Evans		C
4	Ross Oakes	C	C
5	Matty Dawson-Jones	W	x
6	Danny Brough	SO	SH
7	Jordan Lilley	SH	B
8	Anthony England		
9	Thomas Doyle	B	H
10	Steve Crossley	P	B
11	Adam Rooks	B	L
12	Aaron Murphy		
13	Sam Hallas		
14	George Flanagan	H	B
15	Dan Fleming	L	P
16	Brad Gallagher	SR	SR
17	Levy Nzoungou	B	B
18	Ebon Scurr	B	B
19	David Foggin-Johnston	B	B
20	Brad England	SR	SR
21	Elliot Wallis	B	W
22	Reece Hamlett	C	W
23	Anthony Walker	P	P
25	Jack Sanderson	x	B
26	Matthew Race		
27	Billy Jowitt	B	B
28	Bradley Ho	B	B
29	Cameron Berry	B	x
30	Murphy Smith	B	x
31	Ethan O'Hanlon	B	x
32	Sam Smith	B	x
n/a	Brad Calland	B	B
n/a	Joe Burton	B	B

= Injured

= Suspended

== RFL Championship ==
=== League table ===
Pos	Team	Pld	W	D	L	PF	PA	PP	Pts	PCT	Qualification (Note: Teams must have played at least 70% of scheduled fixtures (16 matches) to qualify for the play-offs. Fixtures involving Toulouse that are cancelled due to quarantine restrictions do not count against either team involved in respect of the 70% requirement.)
1	Toulouse Olympique (Note: Toulouse were awarded the fixture against London scheduled for 17 April after London declined to travel to France. Toulouse are awarded the two competition points and for points scored percentage the score is recorded as a 24–0 win for Toulouse. The game does not count towards the number of games played by London to determine eligibility for the play-offs)	14	14	0	0	698	124	562.9	28	100.00	Championship Leaders' Shield & advance to semi-final
2	Featherstone Rovers	21	20	0	1	943	292	322.9	38 (Note: Featherstone deducted 2 points for breach of the RFL Operational Rules in March 2021.)	90.48	Advance to semi-final
3	Halifax Panthers	21	13	0	8	528	354	149.2	26	61.90	Advance to eliminators
4	Batley Bulldogs	21	13	0	8	561	411	136.5	26	61.90	Advance to eliminators
5	Bradford Bulls	20	12	0	8	514	501	102.6	24	60.00	Advance to eliminators
6	Whitehaven	22	12	1	9	502	524	95.8	25	56.82	Advance to eliminators
7	London Broncos	20	11	1	8	552	579	95.3	21 (Note: London deducted 2 points for breach of the RFL Operational Rules in failing for fulfil the fixture against Toulouse in April 2021.)	52.50	
8	Widnes Vikings	21	9	1	11	494	534	92.5	19	45.24	
9	York City Knights	20	9	0	11	502	477	105.2	18	45.00	
10	Dewsbury Rams	21	8	1	12	360	608	59.2	17	40.48	
11	Newcastle Thunder	20	7	1	12	431	627	68.7	15	37.50	
12	Sheffield Eagles	20	5	3	12	420	665	63.2	13	32.50	
13	Oldham	21	2	1	18	308	748	41.2	5	11.90	Relegated to League 1
14	Swinton Lions	22	2	1	19	404	773	52.3	5	11.36	Relegated to League 1

Rules for classification: 1) win percentage; 2) points scored percentage (points scored divided by points conceded).

=== Championship results ===
LEGEND
Win
Draw
Loss
Postponed

Championship results
Date	Competition	Rnd	Vrs	H/A	Venue	Result	Score	Tries	Goals	Att	Live on TV	Report
4 April 2021	Championship	1	Sheffield Eagles	A	Keepmoat Stadium	L	12-50	Brown, Rooks	Brough 2/2	—	Our League	Report
18 April 2021	Championship	2	Halifax Panthers	H	Crown Flatt	W	27-26	Fleming, Foggin-Johnston, Lilley, Pickersgill	Brough 5/6, Lilley 1 DG	—	Our League	Report
25 April 2021	Championship	3	Dewsbury Rams	H	Crown Flatt	W	35-14	Brown (2), Brough, England, Oakes	Brough 7/7, Brough 1 DG	—	Our League	Report
2 May 2021	Championship	4	Whitehaven R.L.F.C.	A	Recreation Ground	W	30-22	Crossley (2), Brown, Pickersgill, Scurr	Brough 5/5	—	Our League	Report
9 May 2021	Championship	5	Swinton Lions	A	Heywood Road	W	23-22	Brough, Doyle, Foggin-Johnston, Pickersgill	Brough 3/4, Lilley 1 DG	—	Our League	Report
23 May 2021	Championship	7	London Broncos	A	Trailfinders Sports Ground	W	33-8	Robson (2), Doyle, Murphy, Pickersgill	Brough 4/4, Lilley 2/2, Brough 1 DG	—	Our League	Report
30 May 2021	Championship	8	York City Knights	H	Odsal Stadium	W	37-18	Brown (2), Golding, Lilley, Oakes	Brough 8/8, Brough 1 DG	3,742	-	Report
6 June 2021	Championship	6	Newcastle Thunder	H	Odsal Stadium	W	31-12	Crossley, Doyle, Lilley, Robson, Walker	Brough 4/4, Lilley 1/1, Brough 1 DG	-	Our League	Report
13 June 2021	Championship	9	Featherstone Rovers	A	Post Office Road	L	0-44	-	-	-	Our League	Report
19 June 2021	Championship	10	Toulouse Olympique	A	Stade Ernest-Wallon	-	P-P	Postponed due to COVID-19	-	-	-	-
27 June 2021	Championship	11	Widnes Vikings	H	Odsal Stadium	L	12-25	Scurr, Walker	Lilley 2/2	-	-	Report
4 July 2021	Championship	12	Batley Bulldogs	H	Odsal Stadium	W	30-16	Brown, Burton, Doyle, England, B. Evans	Keyes 5/6	-	-	Report
11 July 2021	Championship	13	Oldham R.L.F.C.	A	Bower Fold	W	54-22	Keyes (3), Pickersgill (2), Brown, England, R. Evans, Foggin-Johnston	Keyes 9/10	-	Our League	Report
25 July 2021	Championship	14	Featherstone Rovers	H	Odsal Stadium	L	30-36	B. Evans, R. Evans, Flanagan, Foggin-Johnston, Pickersgill	Keyes 4/6, Flanagan 1/1	-	-	Report
1 August 2021	Championship	15	Halifax Panthers	A	Shay Stadium	L	21-24	Brown, Doyle, England, Pickersgill	Hallas 2/4, Flanagan 1 DG	-	-	Report
8 August 2021	Championship	16	Sheffield Eagles	H	Odsal Stadium	-	P-P	Postponed due to COVID-19	-	-	-	-
14 August 2021	Championship	17	Newcastle Thunder	A	Kingston Park	W	36-12	Flanagan (2), Foggin-Johnston (2), Crossley, Rooks	Lilley 6/7	-	Our League	Report
22 August 2021	Championship	18	Swinton Lions	H	Odsal Stadium	W	30-26	Flanagan (2), Foggin-Johnston, Oakes, Pickersgill	Lilley 5/5	-	-	Report
29 August 2021	Championship	19	York City Knights	A	York Community Stadium	W	36-18	R. Evans (3), B. Evans, Foggin-Johnston, Lilley	Brough 5/7, Lilley 1/1	Attendance	-	Report
5 September 2021	Championship	20	Toulouse Olympique	H	Crown Flatt	L	6-60	Flanagan	Lilley 1/1	Attendance	-	Report
12 September 2021	Championship	21	Widnes Vikings	A	Halton Stadium	L	9-10	Lilley	Lilley 2/2, Brough 1 DG	Attendance	-	Report
19 September 2021	Championship	22	Whitehaven R.L.F.C.	H	Odsal Stadium	L	22-36	B. Evans (2), Foggin-Johnston, Murphy	Brough 2/3, Hallas 1/1	5,340	-	Report
25 September 2021	Championship	EPO	Batley Bulldogs	A	Mount Pleasant	L	10-23	Brown, Lilley	Brough 1/2	Attendance	Sky Sports	Report

=== Player appearances ===
FB=Fullback	C=Centre	W=Winger	SO=Stand Off	SH=Scrum half	P=Prop	H=Hooker	SR=Second Row	LF=Loose forward	B=Bench

No	Player	1	2	3	4	5	7	8	6	9	11	12	13	14	15	17	18	19	20	21	22	EPO
1	Brandon Pickersgill	SO	FB	FB	FB	FB	FB	FB	FB	SO	FB	FB	FB	FB	FB	FB	FB	FB	FB			
2	Joe Brown	FB	W	W	W	W	W	W	W	FB	W	W	SO	SO	SO	SO	SO		W	W	W	W
3	Rhys Evans	C	C	C	C	C	C	C	C	C	C	C	C	C	C	C	C	C	C	C	C	C
4	Ross Oakes	C	C	C	C	C	C	C	C	C	C	C	C	C	C	C	C	C	C	C	C	C
5	Matty Dawson-Jones																W	W				
6	Danny Brough	SH	SO	SO	SO	SO	SO	SO	SO									SO	x	SO	SO	SO
7	Jordan Lilley	Red card	SH	SH	SH	SH	SH	SH	SH	SH	SH	SH			SH	SH	SH	SH	SH	SH	SH	SH
8	Anthony England	– (Note: Retired)																				
9	Thomas Doyle	H	H	H	H	H	H	H	H	H		H	H		H	H	H	H	H	H	H	H
10	Steve Crossley	P	P	P	P	P	P	P	P	P	P	P	P	P	P	P		P	P	P	P	P
11	Adam Rooks	SR	SR	B	B	B	x	x	x	x	B	B	B	B	B	SR	SR	x	x	x	x	SR
12	Aaron Murphy	L	SR	SR	SR	SR	SR	SR			SR	SR	SR		SR	SR	SR	SR	x	SR	SR	SR
13	Sam Hallas								L	L	H	L		H	L	L	L	L	SR	L	L	L
14	George Flanagan	Red card	Red card	Red card	Red card	Red card	Red card	Red card	Red card	Red card	Red card	B	B	B	B	B	B	B	B	B	B	B
15	Dan Fleming	P	B	B	B	L	P	P			L	P	P	P			B	B	L	B	B	B
16	Brad Gallagher	SR				SR	x	x	SR	SR	SR			SR					x	x	x	x
17	Levy Nzoungou	B	P	P	P																	
18	Ebon Scurr	B	B	B	B	B	B	B	B	B	B		B	B	B	B						B
19	David Foggin-Johnston	x	W	W	W	W	x	x	B	W	x	x	W	W	W	W	W	W	W	W	W	W
20	Brad England	x	B	SR	SR		SR	SR	SR	SR	B	SR	SR	SR	SR		B	SR	SR	SR	SR	
21	Elliot Wallis	x	– (Note: Returned to Hull Kingston Rovers)																			
22	Reece Hamlett	W	x	x	x	x	x	– (Note: On loan at Swinton Lions)		W	x	x	W	W	W	W	– (Note: On loan at Swinton Lions)					
23	Anthony Walker	x	x	B	B	B	B	x	B	B	B	B	B	B	P	P	P	B	x	B	B	B
24	Ben Evans	B	L	L	L	P	L	L	x	P	P	B	L	L		B	P	P	P	P	P	P
25	Jack Sanderson	W	x	x	x	x	x								x	x	x	x	x	x	x	x
26	Matthew Race	x	x	x	x	x	x	x	x	x	x	x	x	– (Note: On loan at North Wales Crusaders)								
27	Billy Jowitt	B	B					x	x	x	SO					x	x	x	SO	x	x	x
28	Bradley Ho	x	x	– (Note: On loan at Coventry Bears)													B	– (Note: On loan at Coventry Bears)	B	x	x	x
29	Cameron Berry	x	x	x	x	x	x	x	x	x	x	x	x	– (Note: On loan at North Wales Crusaders)								
30	Murphy Smith	x	x	x	x	x	x	x	x	x	x	x	x	x	x	x	x	x	x	x	x	x
31	Ethan O'Hanlon	x	x	x	x	x	x	x	x	x	– (Note: On loan at North Wales Crusaders)								B	x	x	x
32	Sam Smith	x	x	x	x	x	x	x	x	x	x	x	x	x	x	x	x	x	x	x	x	x
34	Joe Burton	x	x	x	x	B	B	x	x	B	W	W				B	x	x	B	x	x	x
35	Ellis Robson	– (Note: Was at Warrington Wolves)					B	B	B	B	– (Note: Returned to Warrington Wolves)											
36	Mitieli Vulikijapani	– (Note: Was at Hull F.C.)					W	W		– (Note: Returned to Hull F.C.)												
37	Oliver Wilson	– (Note: Was at Huddersfield Giants)						B	P	– (Note: Returned to Huddersfield Giants)												
38	Ashton Golding	– (Note: Was at Huddersfield Giants)						B	W	– (Note: Returned to Huddersfield Giants)												
39	Joe Keyes	– (Note: Was at Hull Kingston Rovers)										SO	SH	SH		– (Note: Returned to Hull Kingston Rovers)						
40	Jordan Baldwinson	– (Note: Was at York City Knights)													B	– (Note: Returned to York City Knights)						
41	Masimbaashe Matongo	– (Note: Was at Hull F.C.)																B	– (Note: Returned Hull F.C.)			
44	Eldon Myers	– (Note: Unattached)								B	B	x										
53	Elliot Kear	– (Note: Was at Salford Red Devils)					– (Note: Unavailable due to Work Commitments)													FB	FB	FB

= Injured

= Suspended

== Challenge Cup ==
LEGEND
Win
Draw
Loss

Date	Competition	Rnd	Vrs	H/A	Venue	Result	Score	Tries	Goals	Att	TV	Report
21 March 2021	Challenge Cup	1st	Featherstone Rovers	A	Post Office Road	L	16-41	Hamlett (2), Scurr	Brough 2/3	—	BBC Sport	Report

=== Player appearances ===
FB=Fullback	C=Centre	W=Winger	SO=Stand Off	SH=Scrum half	P=Prop	H=Hooker	SR=Second Row	LF=Loose forward	B=Bench

No	Player	1
1	Brandon Pickersgill	SO
2	Joe Brown	FB
3	Rhys Evans	C
4	Ross Oakes	C
5	Matty Dawson-Jones	
6	Danny Brough	SH
7	Jordan Lilley	Red card
8	Anthony England	
9	Thomas Doyle	H
10	Steve Crossley	P
11	Adam Rooks	SR
12	Aaron Murphy	
13	Sam Hallas	L
14	George Flanagan	B
15	Dan Fleming	P
16	Brad Gallagher	SR
17	Levy Nzoungou	x
18	Ebon Scurr	B
19	David Foggin-Johnston	x
20	Brad England	B
21	Elliot Wallis	x
22	Reece Hamlett	W
23	Anthony Walker	B
25	Jack Sanderson	W
26	Matthew Race	
27	Billy Jowitt	x
28	Bradley Ho	x
29	Cameron Berry	x
30	Murphy Smith	x
31	Ethan O'Hanlon	x
32	Sam Smith	x

== Squad statistics ==
- Appearances and points include (Championship, Challenge Cup and Play-offs) as of 25 September 2021.

No	Player	Position	Age	Previous club	Apps	Tries	Goals	DG	Points
1	Brandon Pickersgill	Fullback	23	Bradford Bulls Academy	19	9	0	0	36
2	Joe Brown	Wing	22	Wigan Warriors	21	10	0	0	40
3	Rhys Evans	Centre	28	Leeds Rhinos	22	5	0	0	20
4	Ross Oakes	Centre	24	Bradford Bulls Academy	22	3	0	0	12
5	Matty Dawson-Jones	Wing	30	Hull F.C.	2	0	0	0	0
6	Danny Brough	Scrum half	38	Wakefield Trinity	13	2	48	5	109
7	Jordan Lilley	Scrum half	24	Leeds Rhinos	18	6	20	2	66
8	Anthony England	Prop	34	Wakefield Trinity	0	0	0	0	0
9	Thomas Doyle	Hooker	22	Bradford Bulls Academy	20	5	0	0	20
10	Steve Crossley	Prop	31	Toronto Wolfpack	21	4	0	0	16
11	Adam Rooks	Second row	21	Hull Kingston Rovers	14	2	0	0	8
12	Aaron Murphy	Second row	32	Huddersfield Giants	17	2	0	0	8
13	Sam Hallas	Hooker	24	Leeds Rhinos	14	0	3	0	6
14	George Flanagan	Hooker	34	Hunslet R.L.F.C.	12	6	1	1	27
15	Dan Fleming	Prop	28	Castleford Tigers	18	1	0	0	4
16	Brad Gallagher	Second row	21	Bradford Bulls Academy	7	0	0	0	0
17	Levy Nzoungou	Prop	23	Racing Club Albi XIII	4	0	0	0	0
18	Ebon Scurr	Prop	20	Bradford Bulls Academy	16	3	0	0	12
19	David Foggin-Johnston	Wing	24	Hunslet R.L.F.C.	16	9	0	0	36
20	Brad England	Second row	25	Doncaster R.L.F.C.	18	4	0	0	16
21	Elliot Wallis	Wing	20	Hull Kingston Rovers (Loan)	0	0	0	0	0
22	Reece Hamlett	Wing	19	Warrington Wolves	7	2	0	0	8
23	Anthony Walker	Prop	29	Retirement	18	2	0	0	8
24	Ben Evans	Prop	28	Toulouse Olympique	19	5	0	0	20
25	Jack Sanderson	Wing	23	Castleford Tigers	2	0	0	0	0
26	Matthew Race	Stand off	19	Bradford Bulls Academy	0	0	0	0	0
27	Billy Jowitt	Centre	19	Bradford Bulls Academy	4	0	0	0	0
28	Bradley Ho	Prop	19	Bradford Bulls Academy	2	0	0	0	0
29	Cameron Berry	Hooker	19	Bradford Bulls Academy	0	0	0	0	0
30	Murphy Smith	Wing	19	Bradford Bulls Academy	0	0	0	0	0
31	Ethan O'Hanlon	Prop	20	Bradford Bulls Academy	1	0	0	0	0
32	Sam Smith	Centre	20	Bradford Bulls Academy	0	0	0	0	0
34	Joe Burton	Centre	18	Bradford Bulls Academy	7	1	0	0	4
35	Ellis Robson	Loose forward	22	Warrington Wolves (Loan)	4	3	0	0	12
36	Mitieli Vulikijapani	Wing	n/a	Hull F.C. (Loan)	2	0	0	0	0
37	Oliver Wilson	Prop	21	Huddersfield Giants (Loan)	2	0	0	0	0
38	Ashton Golding	Fullback	24	Huddersfield Giants (Loan)	2	1	0	0	4
39	Joe Keyes	Stand off	25	Hull Kingston Rovers (Loan)	3	3	18	0	48
40	Jordan Baldwinson	Prop	26	York City Knights (Loan)	1	0	0	0	0
41	Masimbaashe Matongo	Prop	25	Hull F.C. (Loan)	1	0	0	0	0
44	Eldon Myers	Centre	n/a	Unattached	2	0	0	0	0
53	Elliot Kear	Wing	32	Salford Red Devils	3	0	0	0	0

== Transfers ==
=== In ===
	Name	Position	Signed from	Date
(England)	Danny Brough	Stand off	Wakefield Trinity	June 2020
(England)	Aaron Murphy	Second row	Huddersfield Giants	August 2020
(England)	Brad England	Second row	Doncaster R.L.F.C.	September 2020
(England)	Adam Rooks	Second row	Hull Kingston Rovers	September 2020
(Wales)	Rhys Evans	Centre	Leeds Rhinos	September 2020
(England)	Reece Hamlett	Wing	Warrington Wolves	November 2020
(England)	Elliot Wallis	Wing	Hull Kingston Rovers (Loan)	November 2020
(England)	Dan Fleming	Prop	Castleford Tigers	November 2020
(England)	Jack Sanderson	Wing	Castleford Tigers	March 2021
(Wales)	Ben Evans	Prop	Toulouse Olympique	March 2021
(Wales)	Elliot Kear	Wing	Salford Red Devils	May 2021
(England)	Ellis Robson	Loose forward	Warrington Wolves (Loan)	May 2021
(Fiji)	Mitieli Vulikijapani	Wing	Hull F.C. (Loan)	May 2021
(England)	Oliver Wilson	Prop	Huddersfield Giants (Loan)	May 2021
(England)	Ashton Golding	Fullback	Huddersfield Giants (Loan)	May 2021
(England)	Joe Keyes	Stand off	Hull Kingston Rovers (Loan)	June 2021
(England)	Jordan Baldwinson	Prop	York City Knights (Loan)	July 2021
(Zimbabwe)	Masimbaashe Matongo	Prop	Hull F.C. (Loan)	August 2021

=== Out ===
	Name	Position	Club Signed	Date
(England)	Cobi Green	Scrum half	Swinton Lions	August 2020
(England)	Luke Littlewood	Scrum half	Rochdale Hornets	August 2020
(England)	Connor Farrell	Second row	Retirement	September 2020
(England)	Liam Kirk	Prop	Oldham R.L.F.C.	October 2020
(England)	Evan Hodgson	Second row	Newcastle Thunder	December 2020
(England)	Harry Shackleton	Scrum half	Retirement	December 2020
(England)	Sam Barlow	Prop	Released	December 2020
(England)	Greg Johnson	Wing	Released	December 2020
(England)	Dan Waite-Pullan	Second row	Released	December 2020
(England)	Keelan Foster	Prop	Released	December 2020
(England)	Anthony England	Prop	Retirement	April 2021
(England)	Elliot Wallis	Wing	Hull Kingston Rovers (Loan Return)	April 2021
(England)	Bradley Ho	Prop	Coventry Bears (Loan)	April 2021
(England)	Reece Hamlett	Centre	Swinton Lions (Loan)	May 2021
(Fiji)	Mitieli Vulikijapani	Wing	Hull F.C. (Loan Return)	June 2021
(England)	Oliver Wilson	Prop	Huddersfield Giants (Loan Return)	June 2021
(England)	Ashton Golding	Fullback	Huddersfield Giants (Loan Return)	June 2021
(England)	Ellis Robson	Loose forward	Warrington Wolves (Loan Return)	June 2021
(England)	Ethan O'Hanlon	Prop	North Wales Crusaders (Loan)	June 2021
(England)	Matthew Race	Scrum half	North Wales Crusaders (Loan)	July 2021
