= 2020 Bradford Bulls season =

- Championship Rank: Season Suspended
- Challenge Cup: 5th Round
- 2020 record: Wins: 3; draws: 0; losses: 3
- Points scored: For: 126; against: 77

Team information
- Chairman: Eric Perez
- Head Coach: John Kear
- Captain: Steve Crossley
- Stadium: Crown Flatt
- High attendance: 3,640 vs. Featherstone Rovers

Top scorers
- Tries: Matty Dawson-Jones (4)
- Goals: Rowan Milnes (18)
- Points: Rowan Milnes (44)
← 2019	List of seasons	2021 →

This article details the Bradford Bulls rugby league football club's 2020 season. This is the Bulls second season in the Championship after narrowly missing out on the playoffs in the previous season.

== Season review ==
=== August 2019 ===
Preparations for the 2020 season started with the announcement from chairman Andrew Chalmers that the Bulls would move away from Odsal Stadium for the upcoming season due to the high rent and maintenance costs, with Dewsbury Rams home ground Crown Flatt hosting Bradford's home games. Following this news the Rugby Football League placed the Bulls under 'special measures' over concerns of the club's finances and budgets for 2020 which also prevented Bradford from making signings during this period. Loose forward George Milton and second-row Colton Roche left the club sometime during the season.

=== September 2019 ===
Academy product and prolific try-scorer Ethan Ryan signed a two-year deal with Super League side Hull Kingston Rovers. Following Ryan's departure head coach John Kear announced that Matt Garside, Matty Wildie, Ashley Gibson, Callum Bustin and James Green would not be offered new contracts at the club and were released. Garside subsequently signed for local rivals Halifax R.L.F.C. whilst Green signed for York City Knights. Hooker Wildie signed for Leigh Centurions and prop Bustin switched codes to play rugby union for Yorkshire Carnegie.

=== October 2019 ===
As fears grew over the financial stability of the club it was announced that a senior player evoked a termination of his contract relating to issues revolving around pension payments. Throughout the month there were numerous reports that the Bulls were going to be sold to a 'UK investor group' spearheaded by former Wakefield Trinity owner Chris Brereton. Prop forward Jon Magrin signed a one-year deal to play at Dewsbury Rams. Popular hard hitting centre Jake Webster signed a two-year deal with League 1 side Keighley Cougars combining a playing contract alongside a role working with the community. Potential new owner Brereton revealed that the clubs had debts of up to £500,000 and that he would work towards getting Bradford debt free in two years. The exodus continued at the Bulls as fan favourite, Bradford born Ross Peltier signed for Doncaster R.L.F.C. Chris Brereton pulled out of the consortium attempting to buy the Bulls. However the following day it was revealed that former head of RFL Nigel Wood and Dewsbury chairman Mark Sawyer had appointed former Toronto Wolfpack CEO Eric Perez as the chairman to take over the consortium's bid to buy the Bulls, this brought the club out of special measures.

Following the news that the club had been lifted out of special measures it was announced that academy product Ross Oakes had signed a new two-year deal with the club. However in order to raise some capital for the club playmaker Joe Keyes, young second rower Matthew Storton, second rower Elliot Minchella, halfback Rowan Milnes and academy player Anesu Mudoti all signed three year deals at Hull Kingston Rovers for an undisclosed fee with Milnes coming back to Bradford on loan for 2020. Young winger Josh Rickett signed for League 1 side Doncaster R.L.F.C. The Bulls retained the services of Welsh centre Rhys Evans, experienced hooker George Flanagan and hooker Sam Hallas all on one year deals. Winger Jy Hitchcox was released by the club so that he could take up a playing contract with Toulouse Olympique. Prop Liam Kirk and winger David Foggin-Johnston were given one year contracts to keep them at the Bulls for the 2020 season.

=== November 2019 ===
The Bulls announced two pre-season friendlies for the upcoming season, the first will be against Castleford Tigers on Boxing Day and the second will be against Dewsbury Rams on 19 January. The first new signing for the 2020 season came in the form of Super League winger Greg Johnson on a one-year deal from Grand Finalists Salford City Reds. Bradford will face arch rivals Leeds Rhinos in a testimonial match for long serving Leeds player Jamie Jones-Buchanan in January 2020. Furthermore a final friendly was added to the pre-season schedule as the Bulls will face Championship rivals York City Knights. Hooker Sam Hallas was named as vice captain for the 2020 season whilst Steve Crossley retains the captaincy. Film actor and former rugby league footballer; Adam Fogerty, became a shareholder at Bradford Bulls. On 17 November the 2020 fixtures were released with the Bulls hosting London Broncos in the first week, in addition to this Bradford would play their 'away' game against Dewsbury Rams at Headingley Stadium in a double header which will see Leeds Rhinos face off against Wakefield Trinity. The Bulls made their second new signing as they announced Wakefield Trinity prop forward Anthony England on a one-year deal. Meanwhile captain Steve Crossley signed a one-year extension keeping him at the Bulls until 2021. Former Bulls player Ashley Gibson and loose forward Mikey Wood joined League 1 side Newcastle Thunder. A final pre-season match was announced with the Bulls travelling to Hunslet R.L.F.C. on 5 January 2020.

=== December 2019 ===
After a four year ban from the game it was announced that former Leigh Centurions prop forward Sam Barlow signed for the Bulls for the 2020 season. Following this news it was revealed that Hull Kingston Rovers had let young second-row forward Adam Rooks join the Bulls on a season long loan. A further signing was made to the Bulls roster as Racing Club Albi XIII prop Levy Nzoungou signed a one-year deal. The Bulls rounded off the year with a 20–14 victory over Super League side Castleford Tigers.

=== January 2020 ===
The start of 2020 saw experienced centre Rhys Evans join Super League side Leeds Rhinos on a season long loan deal. A young Bradford side traveled to Hunslet R.L.F.C. for the second pre-season friendly and lost a close match 18–26 with Murphy Smith, Harry Shackleton and Matthew Race all scoring for the Bulls. The Bulls announced the capture of former academy product Dan Waite-Pullan on a one-year deal from the Leeds Rhinos. Bradford faced arch rivals Leeds in a pre-season friendly for Jamie Jones-Buchanan's testimonial. However former Leeds player Rob Burrow was diagnosed with Motor Neurone Disease (MND) so the match was also used to raise funds to combat MND. The Bulls lost 34–10 in front of a 19,700 sell out crowd at Headingley Stadium with Ross Oakes and Thomas Doyle scoring for the Bulls. Former Bulls players and legends such as Wayne Godwin, Matty Blythe, Rob Parker, Nathan McAvoy, Robbie Hunter-Paul and Stuart Fielden also featured in the final 10 minutes of the match in support of Rob Burrow. Super League side Hull F.C. revealed that they would partner up with the Bulls on dual registration for the 2020 season. The 2020 black away shirt was released and the 2020 squad numbers were also revealed for the Bulls with new signings Anthony England, Adam Rooks, Dan Waite-Pullan and Sam Barlow taking the 8, 11, 20 and 27 shirts respectively. Another pre-season defeat followed this with a 25–12 loss to Dewsbury Rams. The Bulls announced the signing of Hull F.C. winger Matty Dawson-Jones on a one-year deal. In the final pre-season match the Bulls faced rivals York City Knights and came away with a hard-fought 6–4 win before the match was abandoned ten minutes before the final whistle.

=== February 2020 ===
The season commenced with a 14–18 loss to newly relegated side London Broncos, new recruit Matty Dawson-Jones crossed for two tries on his debut whilst young hooker Thomas Doyle also scored for the home side. The Round 2 match against York City Knights was postponed due to bad weather due to the effects of Storm Ciara. The draw for the 2020 Challenge Cup fourth round revealed that the Bulls would face amateur side Underbank Rangers. A narrow 22–30 loss to promotion favourites Featherstone Rovers the following weekend saw the Bulls enter the season with back to back losses, Dawson-Jones was on the scoreboard along with Doyle, Brandon Pickersgill and Jordan Lilley. The Bulls progressed through to the 5th Round of the Challenge Cup with an uncompromising 22–0 win over amateurs Underbank Rangers, following this victory the Bulls were drawn away to Super League side Wakefield Trinity. Centre Rhys Evans signed a permanent contract with his loan club Leeds Rhinos, however he was then loaned back to Bradford for the rest of the season.

=== March 2020 ===
March started positively for the Bulls as they overcame Oldham R.L.F.C. 26–12 to gain the first victory in the league, new loan signing Joe Cator led the way scoring the opening try of the game with Steve Crossley, Sam Hallas and Brandon Pickersgill also scoring tries. The Bulls bolstered their squad by signing former Featherstone Rovers hooker Danny Maskill who had been on trial in the Bulls reserve team. Bradford followed up their first Championship win with a solid 28–0 victory over Sheffield Eagles, young academy product opened up his senior try scoring account with a brace of tries whilst Jordan Lilley, Matty Dawson-Jones and Pickersgill also scored. The Bulls 2020 Challenge Cup run came to an end in a hard fought 14–17 loss to Super League side Wakefield Trinity, the Bulls were ahead with tries from Jordan Lilley and Rowan Milnes before Wakefield secured their place in the next round with a late try. During this month all of rugby league including Super League and the RFL Championship was suspended indefinitely due to the COVID-19 pandemic in the United Kingdom.

=== April 2020 ===
There was no rugby played throughout April due to the ongoing COVID-19 pandemic. At the start of the month the Bradford Bulls announced that the majority of their staff would be placed on furlough meaning that the government would cover 80% of employees salaries in accordance to the COVID-19 job retention scheme set out by the government.

=== May 2020 ===
There was no rugby played throughout May due to the ongoing COVID-19 pandemic. The RFL announced that the Challenge Cup and 1895 Cup finals would be postponed to a later date in 2020 subject to government guidelines due to the coronavirus pandemic.

=== June 2020 ===
There was no rugby played throughout June due to the ongoing COVID-19 pandemic. The first piece of good news for the Bulls during the ongoing pandemic was the announcement that coach John Kear had signed a two-year extension to stay at the club until the end of the 2022 season. In a major coup for the club it was announced that veteran Super League halfback Danny Brough would join the Bulls in 2021 on a two-year deal from Wakefield Trinity.

=== July 2020 ===
There was no rugby played throughout July due to the ongoing COVID-19 pandemic. Vice captain Sam Hallas signed a one-year deal to stay at the club for the 2021 season. During this month the Rugby Football League announced that the RFL Championship and RFL League 1 would not be able to continue the 2020 season, however an autumn tournament would be announced with a £250,000 prize fund to honor the 125th anniversary of the RFL. Homegrown fullback Brandon Pickersgill put pen to paper on a new one-year deal to stay with the club for the 2021 season. Winger Joe Brown also signed an extension to stay with the Bulls.

=== August 2020 ===
Due to the reserves being suspended until 2022 young halfback Cobi Green signed for Swinton Lions. Soon after Green's departure the Bulls announced the re-signing of second-row forwards Brad Gallagher and Ebon Scurr, Gallagher signed a two-year extension whilst Scurr signed for one year. Prop Levy Nzoungou also signed an extension with the Bulls. Young hooker Thomas Doyle was the next player to sign an extension with the Bulls, signing on for another season.

== Milestones ==
- Round 1: Greg Johnson, Matty Dawson-Jones, Anthony England, Adam Rooks and Levy Nzoungou made their debuts for the Bulls.
- Round 1: Brandon Pickersgill and Jordan Lilley made their 50th appearance for the Bulls.
- Round 1: Matty Dawson-Jones scored his 1st try for the Bulls.
- CCR4: Dan Waite-Pullan made his debut for the Bulls.
- CCR4: Levy Nzoungou and Adam Rooks scored their 1st try for the Bulls.
- Round 4: Joe Cator and Jack Brown made their debuts for the Bulls.
- Round 4: Joe Cator scored his 1st try for the Bulls.
- Round 5: Brad Gallagher scored his 1st try for the Bulls.

== Pre-season friendlies ==
LEGEND
Win
Draw
Loss

Bulls score is first.

Date	Competition	Vrs	H/A	Venue	Result	Score	Tries	Goals	Att	Report
26 December 2019	Pre Season	Castleford Tigers	A	The Jungle	W	20–14	Brown (2), Hallas, Milnes	Milnes 2/4	3,306	Report
4 January 2020	Pre Season	Hunslet R.L.F.C.	A	South Leeds Stadium	L	18–26	Race, Shackleton, M.Smith	Race 3/3	671	Report
12 January 2020	Pre Season	Leeds Rhinos	A	Headingley Stadium	L	10–34	Doyle, Oakes	Lilley 1/2	19,700	Report
19 January 2020	Pre Season	Dewsbury Rams	A	Crown Flatt	L	12–25	Kirk, Rooks	Milnes 2/2	1,290	Report
26 January 2020	Pre Season	York City Knights	H	Crown Flatt	W	6–4	Foggin-Johnston	Lilley 1/1	932	Report

== Player appearances ==
- Friendly games only

FB=Fullback	C=Centre	W=Winger	SO=Stand Off	SH=Scrum half	P=Prop	H=Hooker	SR=Second Row	LF=Loose forward	B=Bench

No	Player	1	2	3	4	5
1	Brandon Pickersgill	FB	x	FB		FB
2	Greg Johnson	W	x	W	W	W
3	Rhys Evans	C	– (Note: On Loan at Leeds Rhinos)			
4	Ross Oakes	C	x	C	C	C
5	Joe Brown	W	x	W	FB	C
6	Rowan Milnes	SO	x	SO	SO	SO
7	Jordan Lilley	SH	x	SH	H	SH
8	Anthony England	P	x	P		
9	Thomas Doyle	B	x	B	B	H
10	Steve Crossley	P	x	P	P	P
11	Adam Rooks	SR	x	C	SR	SR
12	Connor Farrell					
13	Sam Hallas	H	x	H		
14	George Flanagan	Red card	Red card	Red card	Red card	Red card
15	Liam Kirk	L	x	L	P	L
16	David Foggin-Johnston	B	x	B	W	W
17	Levy Nzoungou	x	x	x	B	B
18	Evan Hodgson			SR	L	B
19	Matty Dawson-Jones	–				x
20	Dan Waite-Pullan	x	x			
25	Cobi Green	x	SH	x	B	B
26	Harry Shackleton	B	B	B	SH	B
27	Sam Barlow	B	x	x	B	x
28	Brad Gallagher	SR	x	SR	SR	SR
29	Ebon Scurr	B	P	B	x	B
30	Keelan Foster	B	P	B	x	B
n/a	Bradley Ho	x	x	x	B	B
n/a	Sam Smith	B	SR	B		B
n/a	Kieran Buchanan	x	x	x	C	x
n/a	Conner Wynne	x	x	x	B	x
n/a	Charlie Graham	x	x	x	B	x
n/a	Charles Patterson-Lund	x	x	x	B	x
n/a	Josh Bowden	x	x	x	x	P

= Injured

= Suspended

== Table ==
Standings at the time of abandonment.

Pos	Team	Pld	W	D	L	PF	PA	PD	BP	Pts
1	Toulouse Olympique	5	5	0	0	180	48	+132	0	10
2	Leigh Centurions	4	4	0	0	162	40	+122	0	8
3	Featherstone Rovers	4	4	0	0	137	74	+63	0	8
4	London Broncos	5	4	0	1	120	92	+28	0	8
5	Widnes Vikings	5	3	0	2	128	92	+36	0	6
6	Dewsbury Rams	4	3	0	1	72	66	+6	0	6
7	Bradford Bulls	4	2	0	2	90	60	+30	0	4
8	Halifax	4	2	0	2	82	73	+9	0	4
9	Batley Bulldogs	5	1	0	4	82	133	−51	1	3
10	Swinton Lions	3	1	0	2	48	55	−7	0	2
11	Sheffield Eagles	5	1	0	4	60	148	−88	0	2
12	Oldham	5	1	0	4	46	158	−112	0	2
13	York City Knights	4	0	0	4	26	102	−76	0	0
14	Whitehaven	5	0	0	5	54	146	−92	0	0

Updated to match(es) played on 8 March 2020. Season abandoned on 20 July 2020.. Source:

== Fixtures and results ==
LEGEND
Win
Draw
Loss
Postponed

2020 Championship

Date	Competition	Rnd	Vrs	H/A	Venue	Result	Score	Tries	Goals	Att	Live on TV	Report
2 February 2020	Championship	1	London Broncos	H	Crown Flatt	L	14–18	Dawson-Jones (2), Doyle	Lilley 1/3	2,674	–	Report
16 February 2020	Championship	3	Featherstone Rovers	H	Crown Flatt	L	22–30	Dawson-Jones, Doyle, Lilley, Pickersgill	Milnes 3/4	3,640	–	Report
1 March 2020	Championship	4	Oldham R.L.F.C.	A	Bower Fold	W	26–12	Cator, Crossley, Hallas, Pickersgill	Milnes 5/5	1,189	Our League	Report
8 March 2020	Championship	5	Sheffield Eagles	H	Crown Flatt	W	28–0	Gallagher (2), Dawson-Jones, Lilley, Pickersgill	Milnes 4/5	2,707	Our League	Report
22 March 2020	Championship	6	Swinton Lions	A	Heywood Road	-	S–S	RFL cancelled season due to COVID-19	-	-	–	-
29 March 2020	Championship	7	Batley Bulldogs	A	Mount Pleasant	-	S–S	RFL cancelled season due to COVID-19	-	-	–	-
10 April 2020	Championship	8	Halifax R.L.F.C.	H	Crown Flatt	-	S–S	RFL cancelled season due to COVID-19	-	-	–	-
15 April 2020	Championship	9	Widnes Vikings	A	Halton Stadium	-	S–S	RFL cancelled season due to COVID-19	-	-	–	-
19 April 2020	Championship	10	Whitehaven R.L.F.C.	H	Crown Flatt	-	S–S	RFL cancelled season due to COVID-19	-	-	–	-
26 April 2020	Championship	11	Dewsbury Rams	H	Crown Flatt	-	S–S	RFL cancelled season due to COVID-19	-	-	–	-
2 May 2020	Championship	12	Toulouse Olympique	A	Stade Ernest-Argeles	-	S–S	RFL cancelled season due to COVID-19	-	-	–	-
17 May 2020	Championship	13	Leigh Centurions	H	Crown Flatt	-	S–S	RFL cancelled season due to COVID-19	-	-	–	-
24 May 2020	Championship	14	London Broncos	A	Trailfinders Sports Ground	-	S–S	RFL cancelled season due to COVID-19	-	-	–	-
30 May 2020	Summer Bash	15	Featherstone Rovers	N	Bloomfield Road	-	S–S	RFL cancelled season due to COVID-19	-	-	–	-
14 June 2020	Championship	16	Swinton Lions	H	Crown Flatt	-	S–S	RFL cancelled season due to COVID-19	-	-	–	-
21 June 2020	Championship	17	Dewsbury Rams	N	Headingley Stadium	-	S–S	RFL cancelled season due to COVID-19	-	-	–	-
28 June 2020	Championship	18	Oldham R.L.F.C.	H	Crown Flatt	-	S–S	RFL cancelled season due to COVID-19	-	-	–	-
5 July 2020	Championship	19	Sheffield Eagles	A	Olympic Legacy Park	-	S–S	RFL cancelled season due to COVID-19	-	-	–	-
12 July 2020	Championship	20	Whitehaven R.L.F.C.	A	Recreation Ground	-	S–S	RFL cancelled season due to COVID-19	-	-	–	-
26 July 2020	Championship	21	Batley Bulldogs	H	Crown Flatt	-	S–S	RFL cancelled season due to COVID-19	-	-	–	-
2 August 2020	Championship	22	Toulouse Olympique	H	Crown Flatt	-	S–S	RFL cancelled season due to COVID-19	-	-	–	-
9 August 2020	Championship	23	Featherstone Rovers	A	Post Office Road	-	S–S	RFL cancelled season due to COVID-19	-	-	–	-
16 August 2020	Championship	24	Leigh Centurions	A	Leigh Sports Village	-	S–S	RFL cancelled season due to COVID-19	-	-	–	-
23 August 2020	Championship	25	York City Knights	H	Crown Flatt	-	S–S	RFL cancelled season due to COVID-19	-	-	–	-
30 August 2020	Championship	26	Halifax R.L.F.C.	A	Shay Stadium	-	S–S	RFL cancelled season due to COVID-19	-	-	–	-
6 September 2020	Championship	27	Widnes Vikings	H	Crown Flatt	-	S–S	RFL cancelled season due to COVID-19	-	-	–	-
9 February 2020	Championship	2	York City Knights	A	York Community Stadium	-	S–S	RFL cancelled season due to COVID-19	-	-	–	-

== Player appearances ==
- Championship only

FB=Fullback	C=Centre	W=Winger	SO=Stand-off	SH=Scrum half	PR=Prop	H=Hooker	SR=Second Row	L=Loose forward	B=Bench

No	Player	1	3	4	5
1	Brandon Pickersgill	FB	FB	FB	FB
2	Greg Johnson	W	W		
3	Rhys Evans	– (Note: On Loan at Leeds Rhinos)		C	C
4	Ross Oakes	C	C	C	C
5	Joe Brown	C	C	W	W
6	Rowan Milnes	SO	SO	SO	SO
7	Jordan Lilley	SH	SH	SH	SH
8	Anthony England	P	P	P	P
9	Thomas Doyle	B	B	x	B
10	Steve Crossley	P	P	P	P
11	Adam Rooks	SR	SR	x	SR
12	Connor Farrell				
13	Sam Hallas	H	H	H	H
14	George Flanagan	Red card	Red card	B	B
15	Liam Kirk	L	L	x	L
16	David Foggin-Johnston	x	x	x	x
17	Levy Nzoungou	B	B	B	B
18	Evan Hodgson	B	B	x	x
19	Matty Dawson-Jones	W	W	W	W
20	Dan Waite-Pullan	x	x	SR	
25	Cobi Green	x	x	x	x
26	Harry Shackleton	x	x	x	x
27	Sam Barlow				
28	Brad Gallagher	SR	SR	SR	SR
29	Ebon Scurr	B	B	B	B
30	Keelan Foster	x	x	x	x
31	Jack Brown	– (Note: At Hull FC)		B	x
32	Joe Cator	– (Note: At Hull FC)		L	x

= Injured

= Suspended

== Challenge Cup ==
LEGEND
Win
Draw
Loss

Date	Competition	Rnd	Vrs	H/A	Venue	Result	Score	Tries	Goals	Att	TV	Report
22 February 2020	Cup	4th	Underbank Rangers	H	Tetley's Stadium	W	22–0	Flanagan, Milnes, Nzoungou, Rooks	Milnes 3/4	1,458	BBC Sport	Report
13 March 2020	Cup	5th	Wakefield Trinity	A	Belle Vue	L	14–17	Lilley, Milnes	Milnes 3/3	3,112	–	Report

== Player appearances ==
- Challenge Cup games only

FB=Fullback	C=Centre	W=Winger	SO=Stand Off	SH=Scrum half	P=Prop	H=Hooker	SR=Second Row	L=Loose forward	B=Bench

No	Player	4	5
1	Brandon Pickersgill	FB	FB
2	Greg Johnson		
3	Rhys Evans	– (Note: On Loan at Leeds Rhinos)	x
4	Ross Oakes	C	C
5	Joe Brown	C	W
6	Rowan Milnes	SO	SO
7	Jordan Lilley	SH	SH
8	Anthony England	x	P
9	Thomas Doyle	H	B
10	Steve Crossley	P	P
11	Adam Rooks	SR	SR
12	Connor Farrell		
13	Sam Hallas	L	L
14	George Flanagan	B	H
15	Liam Kirk	P	
16	David Foggin-Johnston	W	W
17	Levy Nzoungou	B	B
18	Evan Hodgson	x	B
19	Matty Dawson-Jones	W	C
20	Dan Waite-Pullan	B	
25	Cobi Green	x	x
26	Harry Shackleton	x	x
27	Sam Barlow		
28	Brad Gallagher	SR	SR
29	Ebon Scurr	B	B
30	Keelan Foster	x	x

== Squad statistics ==
- Appearances and points include (Super League, Challenge Cup and Play-offs) as of 13 March 2020.

No	Player	Position	Age	Previous club	Apps	Tries	Goals	DG	Points
1	Brandon Pickersgill	Fullback	22	Bradford Bulls Academy	6	3	0	0	12
2	Greg Johnson	Wing	29	Salford City Reds	2	0	0	0	0
3	Rhys Evans	Centre	27	Leigh Centurions	2	0	0	0	0
4	Ross Oakes	Centre	23	Bradford Bulls Academy	6	0	0	0	0
5	Joe Brown	Fullback	21	Wigan Warriors	6	0	0	0	0
6	Rowan Milnes	Scrum half	20	Hull Kingston Rovers (Loan)	6	2	18	0	44
7	Jordan Lilley	Scrum half	23	Leeds Rhinos	6	3	1	0	14
8	Anthony England	Prop	33	Wakefield Trinity	5	0	0	0	0
9	Thomas Doyle	Hooker	21	Bradford Bulls Academy	5	2	0	0	8
10	Steve Crossley	Prop	30	Toronto Wolfpack	6	1	0	0	4
11	Adam Rooks	Second row	20	Hull Kingston Rovers (Loan)	5	1	0	0	4
12	Connor Farrell	Second row	26	Featherstone Rovers	0	0	0	0	0
13	Sam Hallas	Hooker	23	Leeds Rhinos	6	1	0	0	4
14	George Flanagan	Hooker	33	Hunslet R.L.F.C.	4	1	0	0	4
15	Liam Kirk	Prop	22	Bradford Bulls Academy	4	0	0	0	0
16	David Foggin-Johnston	Wing	23	Hunslet R.L.F.C.	2	0	0	0	0
17	Levy Nzoungou	Prop	22	Racing Club Albi XIII	6	1	0	0	4
18	Evan Hodgson	Second row	22	Bradford Bulls Academy	3	0	0	0	0
19	Matty Dawson-Jones	Wing	29	Hull F.C.	6	4	0	0	16
20	Dan Waite-Pullan	Centre	21	Leeds Rhinos	2	0	0	0	0
25	Cobi Green	Scrum half	20	Bradford Bulls Academy	0	0	0	0	0
26	Harry Shackleton	Scrum half	17	Bradford Bulls Academy	0	0	0	0	0
27	Sam Barlow	Prop	31	Unattached	0	0	0	0	0
28	Brad Gallagher	Second row	20	Bradford Bulls Academy	6	2	0	0	8
29	Ebon Scurr	Prop	19	Bradford Bulls Academy	6	0	0	0	0
30	Keelan Foster	Prop	20	Bradford Bulls Academy	0	0	0	0	0
31	Jack Brown	Prop	n/a	Hull F.C. (Loan)	1	0	0	0	0
32	Joe Cator	Prop	n/a	Hull F.C. (Loan)	1	1	0	0	4

== Transfers ==
=== In ===
	Name	Position	Signed from	Date
(England)	Rowan Milnes	Stand off	Hull Kingston Rovers (Loan)	October 2019
(England)	Greg Johnson	Wing	Salford Red Devils	November 2019
(England)	Anthony England	Prop	Wakefield Trinity	November 2019
(England)	Sam Barlow	Prop	Unattached	December 2019
(England)	Adam Rooks	Second row	Hull Kingston Rovers (Loan)	December 2019
(Republic of the Congo)	Levy Nzoungou	Prop	Racing Club Albi XIII	December 2019
(England)	Dan Waite-Pullan	Centre	Leeds Rhinos	January 2020
(England)	Matty Dawson-Jones	Wing	Hull F.C.	January 2020
(Wales)	Rhys Evans	Centre	Leeds Rhinos (Loan)	February 2020
(England)	Danny Maskill	Hooker	Trialist	March 2020

=== Out ===
	Name	Position	Club Signed	Date
(England)	George Milton	Loose forward	Released	August 2019
(England)	Colton Roche	Second row	Released	August 2019
(England)	Ethan Ryan	Wing	Hull Kingston Rovers	September 2019
(England)	Matt Garside	Second row	Halifax R.L.F.C.	September 2019
(England)	James Green	Prop	York City Knights	September 2019
(England)	Matty Wildie	Hooker	Leigh Centurions	September 2019
(England)	Callum Bustin	Prop	Yorkshire Carnegie (RU)	September 2019
(England)	Ashley Gibson	Centre	Newcastle Thunder	September 2019
(Malta)	Jon Magrin	Prop	Dewsbury Rams	October 2019
(Australia)	Jake Webster	Centre	Keighley Cougars	October 2019
(England)	Ross Peltier	Prop	Doncaster R.L.F.C.	October 2019
(England)	Joe Keyes	Stand off	Hull Kingston Rovers	October 2019
(England)	Matthew Storton	Second row	Hull Kingston Rovers	October 2019
(England)	Elliot Minchella	Second row	Hull Kingston Rovers	October 2019
(England)	Rowan Milnes	Scrum half	Hull Kingston Rovers	October 2019
(England)	Anesu Mudoti	Prop	Hull Kingston Rovers	October 2019
(England)	Josh Rickett	Wing	Doncaster R.L.F.C.	October 2019
(Australia)	Jy Hitchcox	Wing	Toulouse Olympique	October 2019
(England)	Mikey Wood	Loose forward	Newcastle Thunder	November 2019
(Wales)	Dalton Grant	Wing	London Skolars	January 2020
(Wales)	Rhys Evans	Centre	Leeds Rhinos (Loan)	January 2020
