= Thomas Doyle (rugby league) =

English rugby league footballer (born 1999)

Personal information
- Full name: Thomas Doyle
- Born: 29 June 1999 (age 27) Leeds, West Yorkshire, England
- Height: 5 ft 8 in (1.73 m)
- Weight: 14 st 13 lb (95 kg)

Playing information
- Position: Hooker
Club
Years	Team	Pld	T	G	FG	P
2019–22	Bradford Bulls	57	16	0	0	64
2023	Keighley Cougars	23	3	0	0	12
2024–26	Wakefield Trinity	34	5	0	0	20
2026(loan)	→ Bradford Bulls	2	0	0	0	0
2026–	York Knights	0	0	0	0	0
	Total	116	24	0	0	96
- Source: As of 13 October 2026

Thomas Doyle (born 29 June 1999) is an English rugby league footballer who plays as a hooker for York Knights in the Super League.

He previously played for the Bradford Bulls and the Keighley Cougars.

== Background ==
Doyle was born in Bradford, West Yorkshire, England. He played as an amateur for both Milford ARLFC and Stanningley ARLFC. He was then brought up in the youth system at the Bulls via the Bradford Bulls Academy.

== Playing career ==
=== Bradford Bulls ===
Doyle first appearance was in 2018 against Dewsbury Rams in pre-season friendly but he did not make his first-class debut until 2019 when he played in the Championship match against Rochdale Hornets, marking his debut with two tries. A further four league and 1895 Cup appearances followed but he did not add to his try tally.

In the 2020 season Doyle made three league appearances scoring two tries and two appearances in the Challenge Cup before the season was abandoned due to the COVID-19 pandemic.

2021 saw Doyle become the Bull's starting hooker as he made 20 appearances, all in the starting line-up and scored five tries during the season. At the end of the season Doyle signed a one-year extension.

The 2022 season saw Doyle make 27 appearances in league and cup with another seven tries scored. During the season there was speculation that Doyle was being the subject of attention from several, unspecified, Super League clubs, but at the end of the season Doyle chose to join Keighley on a two-year deal.

=== Wakefield Trinity ===
On 26 Sep 2023 it was announced that he had signed for Wakefield Trinity in their bid to return to Super League following their relegation in 2023.

On 13 August 2026 it was reported that Wakefield Trinity had released him from his current contract with immediate effect, following his return from his recent loan spell at Bradford Bulls

=== Bradford Bulls (loan) ===
On 29 July 2026 it was reported that he had signed for Bradford Bulls in the Super League on one-week initial loan

=== York Knights ===
On 14 August 2026 it was reported that he had signed for York Knights in the Super League

=== Statistics ===
Statistics do not include pre-season friendlies.

Season	Team	Apps	Tries	Goals	F/G	Points
2018	Bradford Bulls	0	0	0	0	0
2019	Bradford Bulls	5	2	0	0	8
2020	Bradford Bulls	5	2	0	0	8
2021	Bradford Bulls	20	5	0	0	20
2022	Bradford Bulls	27	7	0	0	28
	Sub-total:	57	16	0	0	64
2023	Keighley Cougars	23	3	0	0	12
2024	Wakefield Trinity	29	5	0	0	20
2025	Wakefield Trinity	5	0	0	0	0
2026	Wakefield Trinity	0	0	0	0	0
	Sub-total:	34	5	0	0	20
2026	York Knights	0	0	0	0	0
	Total:	116	24	0	0	96
