= Joe Brown (rugby league) =

English rugby league footballer

Personal information
- Full name: Joe Brown
- Born: 14 January 1999 (age 27) Leeds, West Yorkshire, England
- Height: 6 ft 5 in (196 cm)
- Weight: 13 st 5 lb (85 kg)

Playing information
- Position: Wing, Fullback
Club
Years	Team	Pld	T	G	FG	P
2019–21	Bradford Bulls	29	10	0	0	40
2022–25	York Knights	108	55	1	0	222
2026–	Sheffield Eagles	0	0	0	0	0
	Total	137	65	1	0	262
- Source: As of 11 October 2025

Joe Brown (born 14 January 1999) is an English rugby league footballer who plays as a wing or fullback for the Sheffield Eagles in the Championship.

== Background ==
Brown was born in Leeds, West Yorkshire, England. He was brought up in the youth system at the Bulls, making him a product of the Bradford Bulls Academy, until he signed for Wigan's academy in 2017.

However he re-signed with his former club Bradford in May 2019 for the first team on an 18-month contract.

== Playing career ==
=== Bradford Bulls ===
2019 - 2019 Season

Brown made his debut in the 2019 RFL 1895 Cup Round 2 against Barrow. He then featured in Round 22 against York City before picking up an injury.

2020 - 2020 Season

Brown featured in the pre-season friendlies against the Castleford Tigers, Leeds, Dewsbury and York City. He scored two tries against Castleford.

Brown featured in Round 1 against the London Broncos to Round 5 Sheffield. He also featured in the 2020 Challenge Cup from Round 4 against the Underbank Rangers to Round 5 Wakefield Trinity.

At the end of the season, Brown signed a one-year extension to stay at Bradford.

2021 - 2021 Season

Brown featured in the pre-season friendly against Swinton. Brown featured in Round 1 against Sheffield to Round 9 against Featherstone Rovers then in Round 11 Widnes to Round 18 Swinton. He also featured in Round 20 against Toulouse Olympique to Elimination Playoff Batley. Brown also played in the 2021 Challenge Cup in Round 1 against Featherstone.

=== Statistics ===
Statistics do not include pre-season friendlies.

Season	Appearance	Tries	Goals	F/G	Points
2019 Bradford Bulls	2	0	0	0	0
2020 Bradford Bulls	6	0	0	0	0
2021 Bradford Bulls	21	10	0	0	40
Total	29	10	0	0	40

=== York Knights RLFC ===
On 7 June 2025, Brown played in York's 1895 Cup final victory over Featherstone.

=== Sheffield Eagles ===
On 11 October 2025 it was reported that he had signed for Sheffield Eagles on a 2-year deal
