= Elliot Wallis =

English rugby league footballer

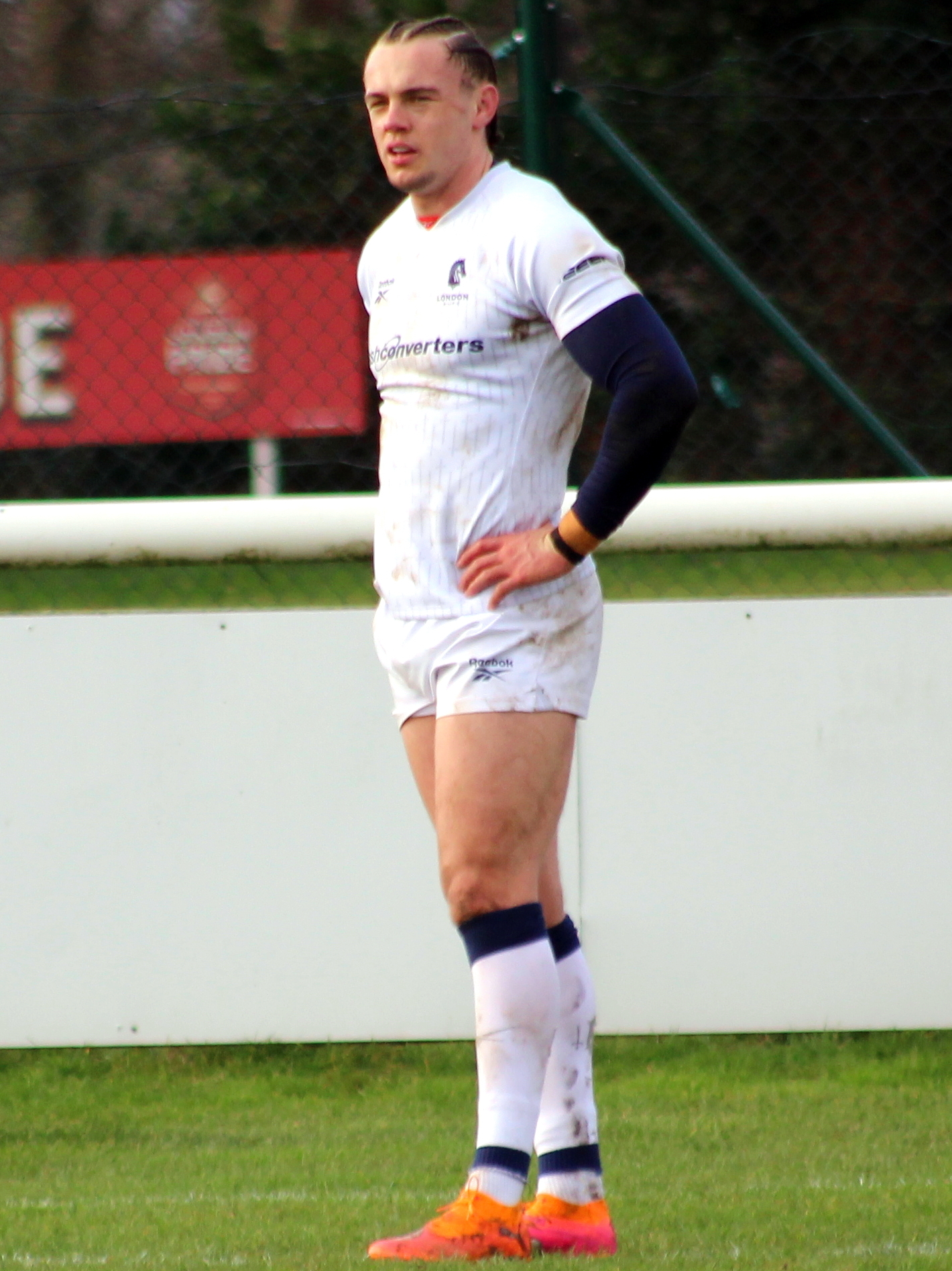

Personal information
- Full name: Elliot Joseph Wallis
- Born: 10 May 2000 (age 26) Kingston upon Hull, East Riding of Yorkshire, England
- Height: 6 ft 3 in (1.91 m)
- Weight: 15 st 4 lb (97 kg)

Playing information
- Position: Wing, Centre
Club
Years	Team	Pld	T	G	FG	P
2018–21	Hull Kingston Rovers	5	2	0	0	8
2020(loan)	→ York City Knights	3	0	0	0	0
2021(loan)	→ Bradford Bulls	0	0	0	0	0
2021	Coventry Bears	6	1	0	0	4
2022–23	Castleford Tigers	13	4	0	0	16
2022(DR)	→ Midlands Hurricanes	4	3	0	0	12
2023(DR)	→ Midlands Hurricanes	3	3	0	0	12
2024–25	Huddersfield Giants	20	8	0	0	32
2025(loan)	→ Leeds Rhinos	0	0	0	0	0
2025(loan)	→ Castleford Tigers	6	1	0	0	4
2026–	London Broncos	30	17	0	0	68
	Total	90	39	0	0	156
- Source: As of 19 November 2026

Elliot Wallis (born 10 May 2000) is an English professional rugby league footballer who plays as a winger or centre for the London Broncos in the Super League.

He has previously played for Hull Kingston Rovers and Castleford Tigers in the Super League, and the Coventry Bears in League 1. He has spent time on loan from Hull KR at the York City Knights and the Bradford Bulls in the Championship, and on dual registration from Castleford at the Midlands Hurricanes in League 1.

== Background ==
Wallis was born in Kingston upon Hull, East Riding of Yorkshire, England. He is of Nigerian heritage.

Wallis played junior rugby league for Skirlaugh Bulls. Wallis progressed through the ranks at the City of Hull Academy before he started spending more time with the Hull Kingston Rovers' first-team squad.

== Playing career ==
=== Hull Kingston Rovers ===
On 13 May 2018, Wallis made his Hull Kingston Rovers début against the Wigan Warriors in the Challenge Cup. His first Super League appearance came 2 weeks later on 25 May 2018, also against Wigan. In June, he signed his first professional contract with Hull KR, agreeing to a three-year deal. On 20 July, Wallis scored his first tries for Hull KR against the Warrington Wolves.

In April 2021, shortly following a recall from his loan move to Bradford, Wallis departed Hull KR by mutual consent.

==== York City Knights (loan) ====
Wallis joined Championship side York City Knights on loan for the 2020 season. He made 3 appearances for the club across February and March before the season was suspended and later abandoned as a result of the COVID-19 pandemic.

==== Bradford Bulls (loan) ====
On 11 November 2020, Wallis signed a one-year loan deal with the Bradford Bulls for the 2021 season. He was assigned squad number 21. He featured in the Bulls' pre-season friendlies against Swinton and Keighley, but departed the club on 15 April 2021 without making a competitive appearance.

=== Coventry Bears ===
In 2021, following his exit from Hull KR, Wallis signed for the Coventry Bears in League 1. He made his Coventry debut on 27 June against Doncaster, and scored his first try for the club against Hunslet on 4 July. While away from full-time rugby league, Wallis took up boxing full-time and worked an apprenticeship in leadership and management.

=== Castleford Tigers ===
In 2022, Wallis joined the Castleford Tigers on trial, to play for the reserves side. At the end of the season, Castleford head coach Lee Radford said, "For me, he was head and shoulders one of our best reserve team players in 2022," and praised his attitude and physicality. In November, the Tigers announced that Wallis would be promoted to the first team in 2023 after signing a one-year professional contract with the option of a further year.

Wallis was assigned squad number 26 for the 2023 season. He made his Castleford debut on 5 May against the Leigh Leopards. He scored his first try for the Tigers at the 2023 Magic Weekend against the Leeds Rhinos, showing "pace and precision to keep himself inside the chalk," by beating two defenders down the touchline. He missed three games due to a pectoral injury in June, before scoring a brace against Leigh on his return. The mid-season departure of fellow winger Bureta Faraimo afforded Wallis a consistent place in the starting line-up, featuring in every game throughout July and August.

==== Midlands Hurricanes (dual registration) ====
Having previously represented the club under its former name Coventry, Wallis featured for the Midlands Hurricanes in League 1 during the 2022 season through their dual registration agreement with Castleford. He made 4 appearances and scored 3 tries.

Wallis returned to the Hurricanes at the beginning of the 2023 season. Following a red card against Cornwall, he was referred to tribunal with a striking charge, and subsequently received a five-match ban. In total, he made 3 appearances and scored a further 3 tries for the club.

=== Huddersfield Giants ===
On 11 Oct 2023 it was announced that he had joined the Huddersfield Giants on a 4-year deal. He scored on his Super League debut in a 16-8 win at Leigh Leopards.

On 5 November 2025 it was reported that he had left Huddersfield Giants by mutual agreement

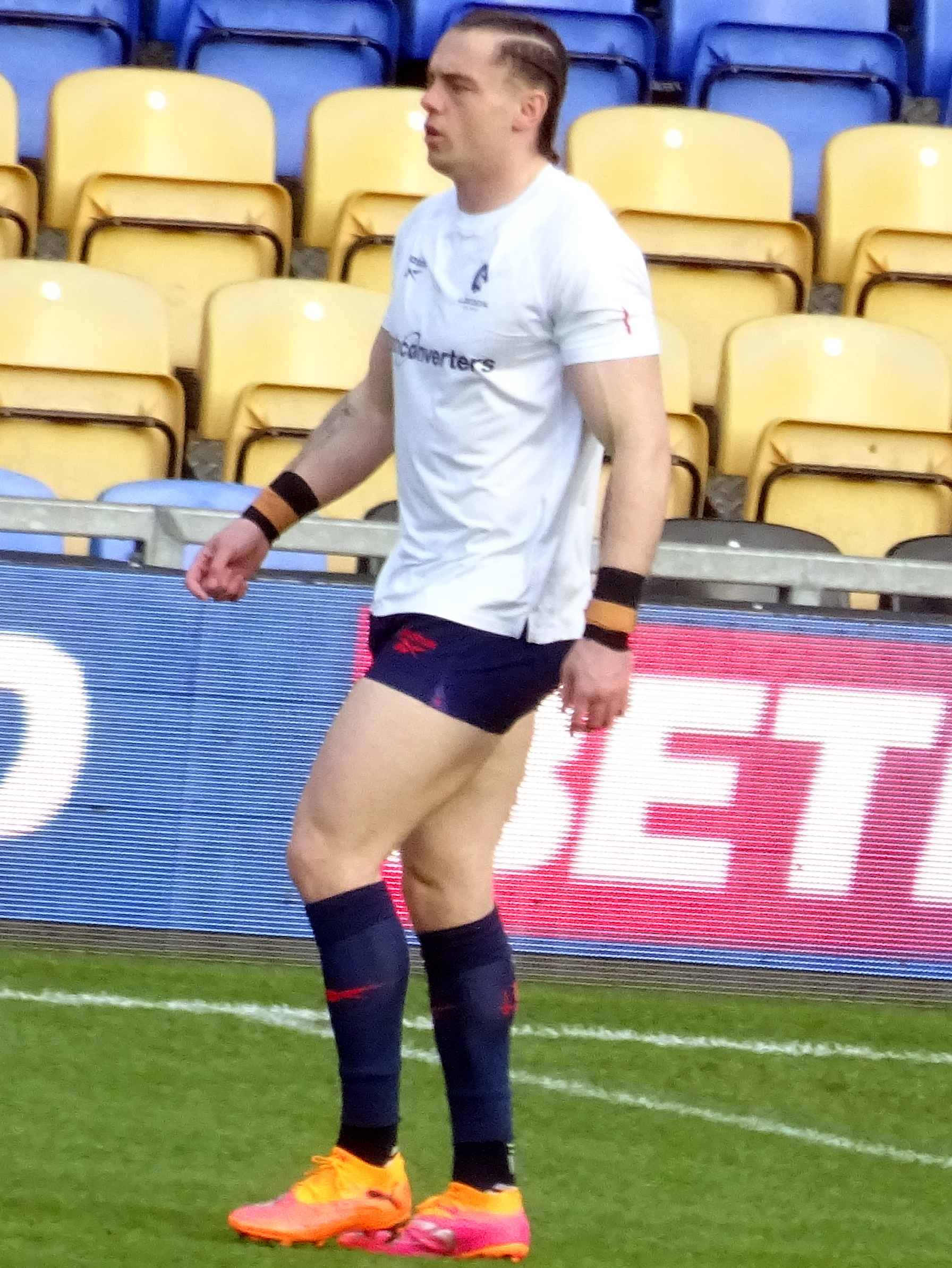
Wallis warming up with the London Broncos in 2026

==== Leeds Rhinos (loan) ====
On 1 May 2025 it was reported that he had signed for the Leeds Rhinos in the Super League on loan.

==== Castleford Tigers (loan) ====
On 13 August 2025 it was reported that he had signed for the Castleford Tigers in the Super League on loan for the remainder of the 2025 season.

=== London Broncos ===
On 13 November 2025 it was reported that he had signed for the London Broncos in the RFL Championship.

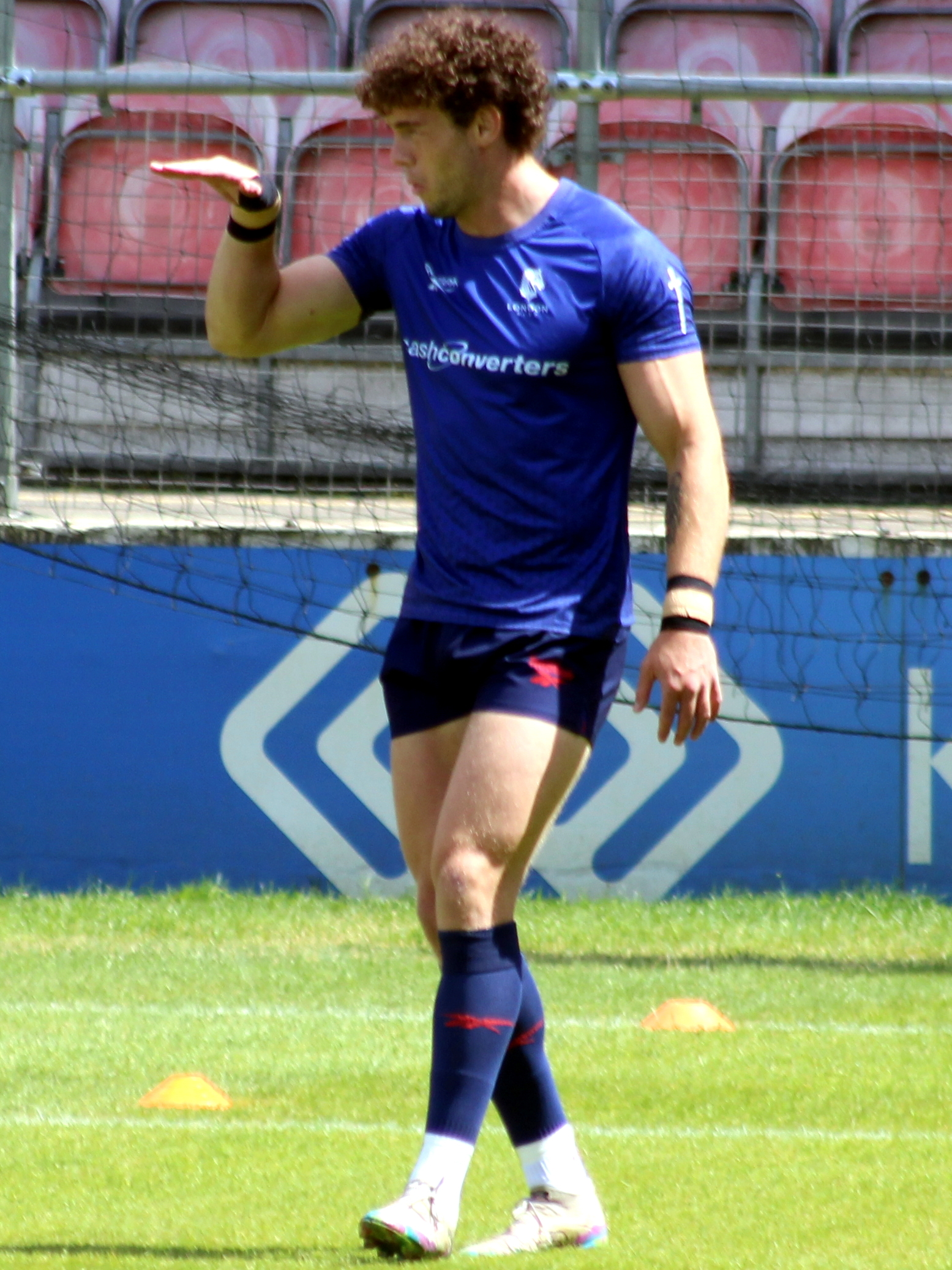
Wallis warming up for the Broncos in July 2026

In August 2026, he was part of the Broncos squad that lifted the RFL Championship Leaders' Shield.

He played in London's 1895 Cup Final victory over the Widnes Vikings at the Halliwell Jones Stadium in August 2026.

In October 2026, he played in the Broncos Championship Grand Final victory over Doncaster at Plough Lane.

== Club statistics ==
Year	Club	League Competition	Appearances	Tries	Goals	Drop goals	Points	Notes
2018	Hull Kingston Rovers	2018 Super League	5	2	0	0	8	
2019	Hull Kingston Rovers	2019 Super League	0	0	0	0	0	
2020	Hull Kingston Rovers	2020 Super League	0	0	0	0	0	
2020	York City Knights	2020 RFL Championship	3	0	0	0	0	loan
2021	Hull Kingston Rovers	2021 Super League	0	0	0	0	0	
2021	Bradford Bulls	2021 RFL Championship	0	0	0	0	0	loan
2021	Coventry Bears	2021 RFL League 1	6	1	0	0	4	
2022	Castleford Tigers	2022 Super League	0	0	0	0	0	
2022	Midlands Hurricanes	2022 RFL League 1	4	3	0	0	12	loan
2023	Castleford Tigers	2023 Super League	13	4	0	0	16	
2023	Midlands Hurricanes	2023 RFL League 1	3	3	0	0	12	loan
2024	Huddersfield Giants	2024 Super League	17	7	0	0	28	
2025	Huddersfield Giants	2025 Super League	3	1	0	0	4	
2025	Leeds Rhinos	2025 Super League	0	0	0	0	0	loan
2025	Castleford Tigers	2025 Super League	6	1	0	0	4	loan
2026	London Broncos	2026 RFL Championship	30	17	0	0	68	
Club career total			90	39	0	0	156	
