= Rowan Milnes =

English rugby league footballer (born 1999)

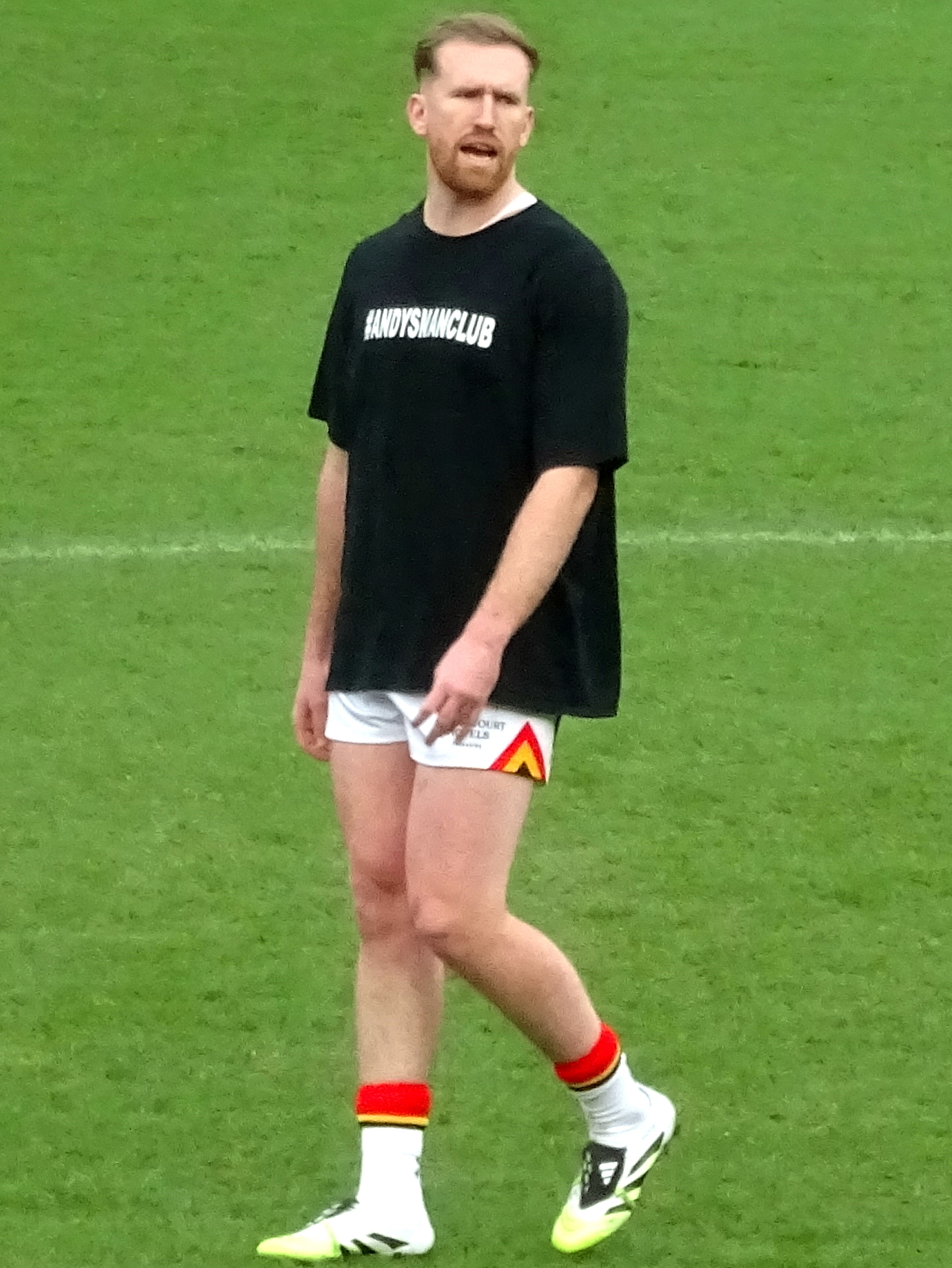

Personal information
- Full name: Rowan Milnes
- Born: 1 September 1999 (age 26) Bradford, West Yorkshire, England
- Height: 6 ft 1 in (1.85 m)
- Weight: 12 st 9 lb (80 kg)

Playing information
- Position: Stand-off, Scrum-half
Club
Years	Team	Pld	T	G	FG	P
2018–19	Bradford Bulls	14	3	8	0	28
2020–23	Hull Kingston Rovers	49	7	41	0	110
2020(loan)	→ Bradford Bulls	6	2	18	0	44
2022(DR)	→ Dewsbury Rams	1	1	0	0	4
2023(loan)	→ Wakefield Trinity	1	0	0	0	0
2024–25	Castleford Tigers	36	10	76	1	193
2025(loan)	→ Hull Kingston Rovers	0	0	0	0	0
2025	Hull Kingston Rovers	0	0	0	0	0
2025(loan)	→ Salford Red Devils	5	0	11	1	23
2026–	Bradford Bulls	5	0	14	0	28
	Total	117	23	168	2	430
- Source: As of 17 October 2025

Rowan Milnes (born 1 September 1999) is an English professional rugby league footballer who plays as a stand-off or scrum-half for the Bradford Bulls in the Super League.

He has previously played for Hull Kingston Rovers and Castleford Tigers in the Super League, and for Bradford Bulls in the Championship and League 1. He has spent time on loan or dual registration at Wakefield Trinity and Salford Red Devils in the Super League, and at Dewsbury Rams in the Championship.

== Background ==
Milnes was born in Bradford, West Yorkshire, England.

He is a product of the Bradford Bulls Academy system. He signed a professional contract with the Bulls prior to the 2018 season.

== Playing career ==
=== Bradford Bulls ===
In the 2018 season, Milnes featured in the pre-season friendlies against Halifax R.L.F.C., Sheffield Eagles and Dewsbury Rams. He scored against Halifax R.L.F.C. (1 goal) and Sheffield Eagles (2 goals). He played in Round 2 (London Skolars) then in Round 10 (Newcastle Thunder).

In the 2019 season, Milnes featured in the pre-season friendlies against York City Knights, Dewsbury Rams, Batley Bulldogs and Toronto Wolfpack. He scored against Dewsbury Rams (2 goals) and Batley Bulldogs (1 goal). Milnes played in Round 3 (Sheffield Eagles) then in Round 8 (Leigh Centurions) to Round 14 (Halifax R.L.F.C.). Milnes also featured in the 2019 Challenge Cup in Round 4 (Keighley Cougars) to Quarter Final (Halifax R.L.F.C.). He scored against Leigh Centurions (1 goal), Dewsbury Rams (1 try), Halifax R.L.F.C. (1 try, 3 goals), Toronto Wolfpack (1 try) and Leeds Rhinos (4 goals).

Following the financial issues at the club, he signed for Hull Kingston Rovers along with four other Bradford players, however Milnes was loaned back to the Bulls for the 2020 season.

=== Hull Kingston Rovers ===
On 12 August 2023, Milnes played for Hull Kingston Rovers in their 17-16 golden point extra-time loss to Leigh in the Challenge Cup final. Milnes played a total of 18 games for Hull Kingston Rovers in the 2023 Super League season as the club finished fourth on the table and qualified for the playoffs.

==== Bradford Bulls (loan) ====
In the 2020 season, Milnes featured in the pre-season friendlies against Castleford Tigers, Leeds Rhinos, Dewsbury Rams and York City Knights. He scored against Castleford Tigers (1 try, 2 goals) and Dewsbury Rams (2 goals). Milnes played in Round 1 (London Broncos) to Round 5 (Sheffield Eagles). Rowan also featured in the 2020 Challenge Cup in Round 4 (Underbank Rangers) to Round 5 (Wakefield Trinity). He scored against Featherstone Rovers (3 goals), Underbank Rangers (1 try, 3 goals), Oldham R.L.F.C. (5 goals), Sheffield Eagles (4 goals) and Wakefield Trinity (1 try, 3 goals).

=== Castleford Tigers ===
On 8 October 2023, the Castleford Tigers announced the signing of Milnes on a two-year deal from the 2024 season. He suffered a partial dislocation of his shoulder in a pre-season friendly against London in January. Milnes made his Castleford debut in round 2 against the Salford Red Devils, and scored his first try on 23 March against the Batley Bulldogs in the Challenge Cup. In round 10 against Leigh, Milnes successfully kicked two late touchline conversions to level the scores. In round 16, he kicked two penalty goals to earn Castleford an away victory against St Helens for only the second time in 33 years.

==== Hull Kingston Rovers (loan) ====
On 6 August 2025, Milnes rejoined Hull KR on an initial two-week loan from Castleford. He provided cover at half-back with both Tyrone May and Danny Richardson unavailable, although did not register an appearance in his two weeks at the Robins.

=== Return to Hull Kingston Rovers ===
On 22 August 2025, Milnes was released from the remainder of his contract at Castleford and subsequently signed for Hull Kingston Rovers for the rest of the 2025 season.

==== Salford Red Devils (loan) ====
Upon signing for Hull KR, Milnes went out on loan to Salford Red Devils with immediate effect. He featured in the final five rounds of the season for the struggling Salford, including their shock round 24 win over Warrington Wolves in which he kicked four conversions and one drop-goal.

=== Return to Bradford Bulls ===
On 17 October 2025, one day after their promotion to Super League was confirmed, Bradford Bulls announced the signing of Milnes on a two-year deal.

== Club statistics ==
Appearances and points in all competitions by year
Club	Season	Tier	App	T	G	DG	Pts
Bradford Bulls	2018	League 1	2	0	0	0	0
Bradford Bulls	2019	Championship	12	3	8	0	28
Bradford Bulls	2020 (Note: Rejoined on loan from Hull KR in 2020)	Championship	6	2	18	0	44
Bradford Bulls	2026	Super League	0	0	0	0	0
Bradford Bulls	Total		20	5	26	0	72
Hull Kingston Rovers	2020	Super League	3	0	0	0	0
Hull Kingston Rovers	2021	Super League	11	3	4	0	20
Hull Kingston Rovers	2022	Super League	21	3	15	0	42
Hull Kingston Rovers	2023	Super League	14	1	22	0	48
Hull Kingston Rovers	2025 (Note: Rejoined on loan from Castleford in 2025)	Super League	0	0	0	0	0
Hull Kingston Rovers	Total		49	7	41	0	110
→ Dewsbury Rams (loan)	2022	Championship	1	1	0	0	4
→ Wakefield Trinity (loan)	2023	Super League	1	0	0	0	0
→ Salford Red Devils (loan)	2025	Super League	5	0	11	1	23
Castleford Tigers	2024	Super League	24	8	51	1	135
Castleford Tigers	2025	Super League	12	2	25	0	58
Castleford Tigers	Total		36	10	76	1	193
Career total			112	23	154	2	402

As of match played 19 September 2025
