= Ellis Robson =

English semi-professional rugby league footballer

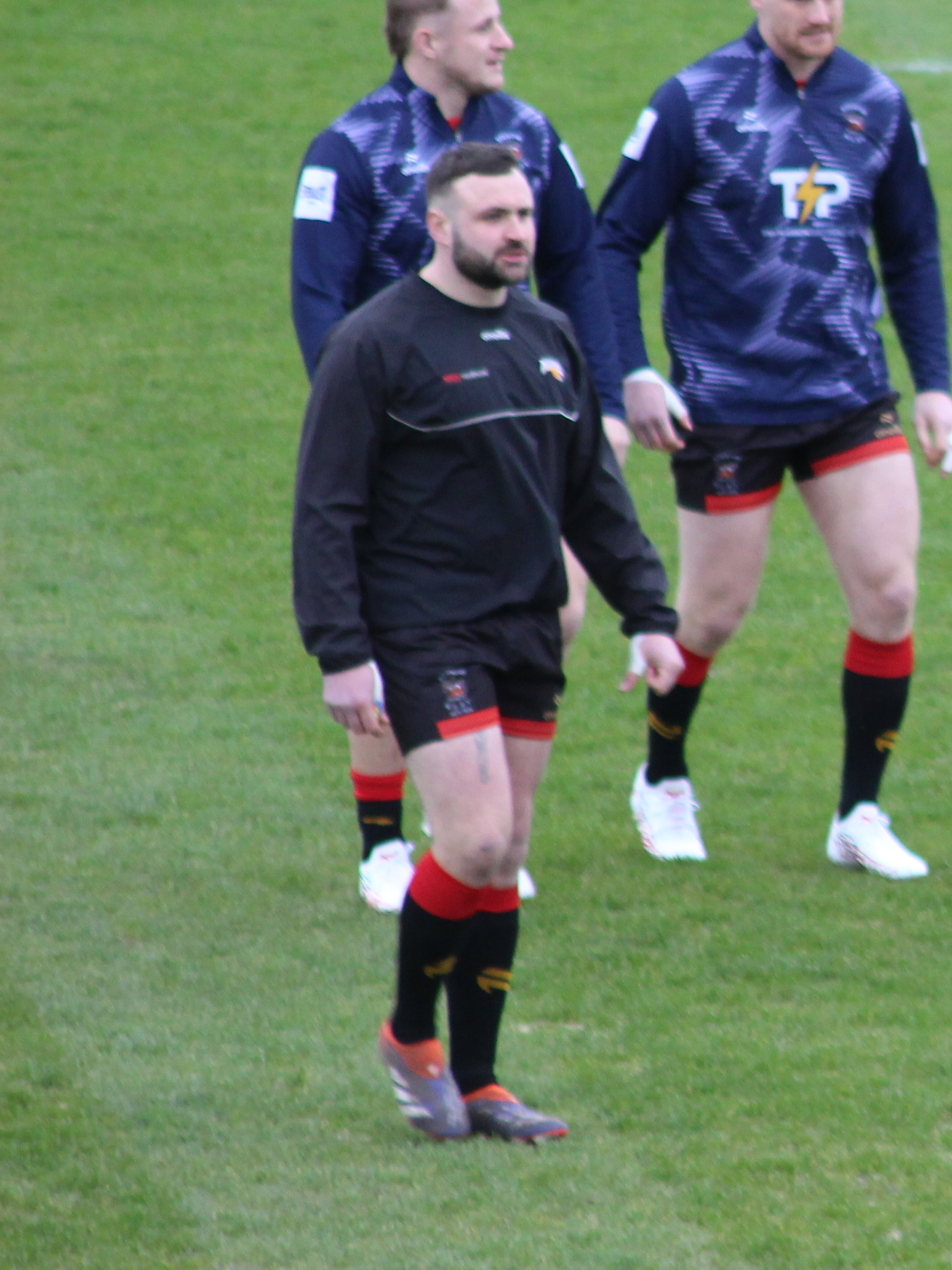

Personal information
- Full name: Ellis Robson
- Born: 14 September 1998 (age 28)
- Height: 5 ft 10 in (1.78 m)
- Weight: 15 st 2 lb (96 kg)

Playing information
- Position: Second-row, Prop, Loose forward
Club
Years	Team	Pld	T	G	FG	P
2019–22	Warrington Wolves	9	0	0	0	0
2019(loan)	→ Widnes Vikings	6	1	0	0	4
2019(loan)	→ Dewsbury Rams	3	0	0	0	0
2019(loan)	→ Rochdale Hornets	9	1	0	0	4
2020(loan)	→ Widnes Vikings	1	1	0	0	4
2021(loan)	→ Widnes Vikings	4	0	0	0	0
2021(loan)	→ Bradford Bulls	4	3	0	0	12
2021(loan)	→ Salford Red Devils	7	1	0	0	4
2022(loan)	→ Toulouse Olympique	1	0	0	0	0
2022	Newcastle Thunder	11	1	0	0	4
2023–24	Keighley Cougars	47	24	0	0	96
2025–	Barrow Raiders	36	10	0	0	40
	Total	138	42	0	0	168
- Source: As of 16 March 2026

Ellis Robson (born 14 September 1998) is a semi-professional rugby league footballer who plays as a second-row, prop or loose forward for the Barrow Raiders in the Championship.

He has spent time on loan from Warrington at the Dewsbury Rams, Widnes Vikings, Rochdale Hornets, Salford Red Devils and the Bradford Bulls in the Championship.

== Career ==
=== Warrington Wolves ===
Robson made his Super League debut in round 11 of the 2020 Super League season for the Wolves against Hull FC.

On 23 October 2020 it was announced that although Robson had previously signed with the Ottawa Aces for 2021, Ottawa agreed to waive the contract in order for Robson to remain at Warrington after being offered a two-year deal with his current club.

=== Widnes Vikings (loan) ===
On 22 April 2021 it was reported that he had signed for the Widnes Vikings in the RFL Championship on loan. Robson made his 3rd loan debut for Widnes against the Batley Bulldogs on 24 Apr 2021.

=== Salford Red Devils (loan) ===
On 29 June 2021 he signed for the Salford Red Devils in the Super League on loan.

=== Keighley Cougars ===
On 28 September 2022 Robson signed for the Keighley Cougars in the RFL Championship on a two-year deal.

=== Barrow Raiders ===
On 18 October 2024 he signed for Barrow in the RFL Championship on a two-year deal.
