= Mitieli Vulikijapani =

Fiji international rugby league footballer

Mitch Vulikijapani
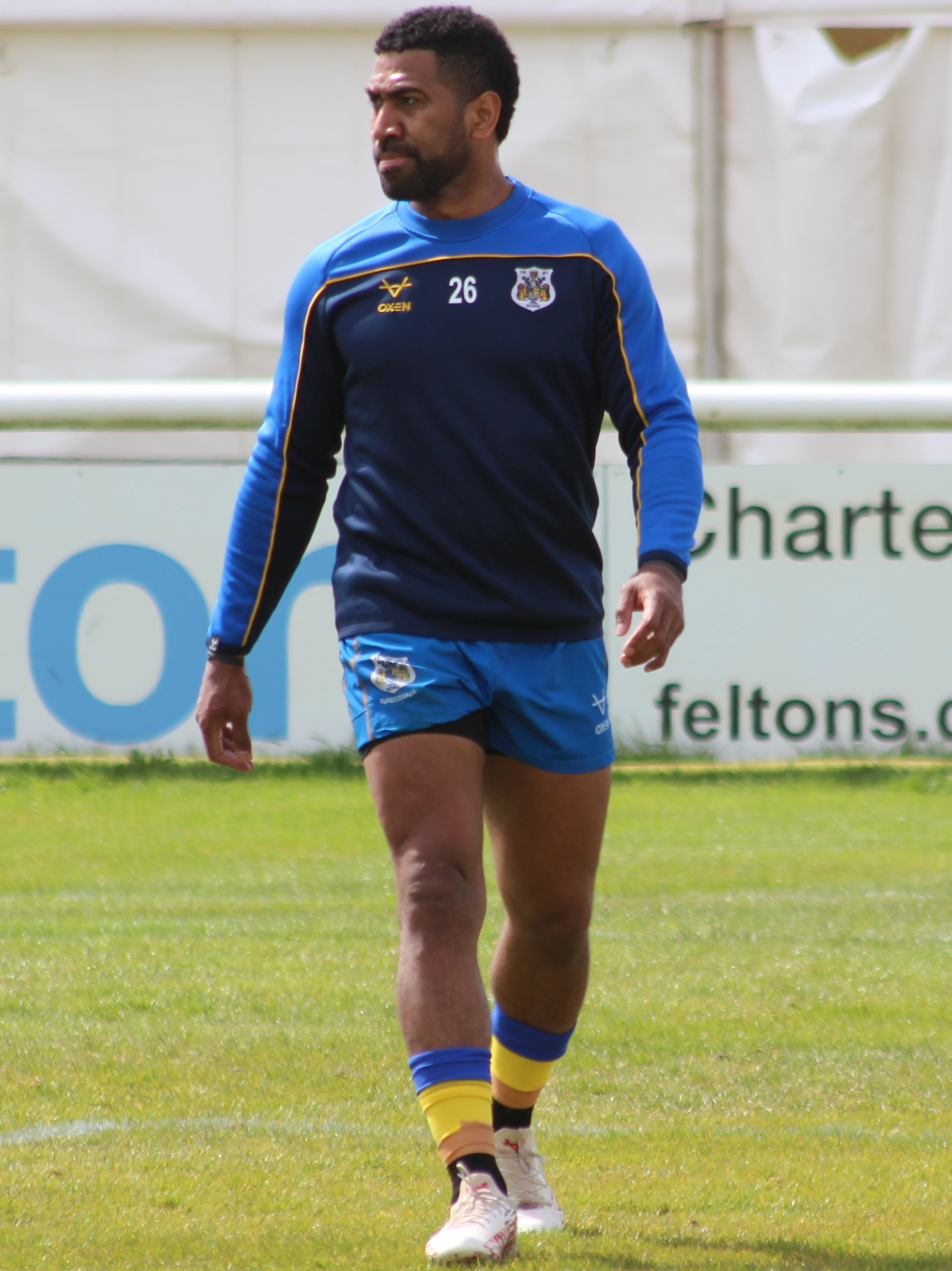

Personal information
- Full name: Mitieli Vulikijapani
- Born: 27 June 1994 (age 32) Suva, Fiji
- Height: 6 ft 1 in (1.86 m)
- Weight: 16 st 5 lb (104 kg)

Playing information

Rugby league
- Position: Wing, Centre
Club
Years	Team	Pld	T	G	FG	P
2021–23	Hull F.C.	24	8	0	0	0
2021(loan)	→ Bradford Bulls	2	0	0	0	0
2026–	Doncaster	6	1	0	0	4
	Total	32	9	0	0	4
Representative
Years	Team	Pld	T	G	FG	P
2022–	Fiji	1	0	0	0	0

Rugby union
- Position: Wing
Club
Years	Team	Pld	T	G	FG	P
2024	Northampton Saints	1	0	0	0	0
- Source: As of 18 May 2026
- Military career
- Allegiance: United Kingdom
- Branch: British Army
- Rank: Gunner
- Unit: 47th Regiment Royal Artillery

Mitieli Vulikijapani (born 27 June 1994) is a Fijian professional rugby league footballer who plays as a winger for Doncaster in the RFL Championship and Fiji at international level. He is also a British Army gunner who serves with the 47th Regiment Royal Artillery who has been granted permission to play rugby.

He spent time on loan from Hull at the Bradford Bulls in the Championship.

== Playing career ==
=== Hull FC ===
In 2021, he made his FC début in the Super League against Leigh.

In round 15 of the 2021 Super League season, he scored two tries for Hull F.C. in a 40–26 loss against Huddersfield.

=== Doncaster RLFC ===
On 13 February 2026 it was reported that he had signed for Doncaster RLFC in the RFL Championship
