= Jack Sanderson =

English rugby league footballer

Personal information
- Full name: Jack Sanderson
- Born: 18 March 1998 (age 27)
- Height: 6 ft 2 in (1.88 m)
- Weight: 14 st 13 lb (95 kg)

Playing information
- Position: Wing, Centre, Fullback
Club
Years	Team	Pld	T	G	FG	P
2018–20	Hull FC	0	0	0	0	0
2018(loan)	→ Doncaster RLFC	24	20	25	0	130
2020	Castleford Tigers	3	1	0	0	4
2021	Bradford Bulls	2	0	0	0	0
2022–	Doncaster RLFC	28	22	6	0	68
	Total	57	43	31	0	202
- Source: As of 7 January 2023

Jack Sanderson is a professional rugby league footballer who plays as a winger or fullback for the Doncaster R.L.F.C. in the RFL League 1.

He was contracted to Hull FC in the Super League and spent time on loan from Hull at Doncaster in League 1. Sanderson also played for the Castleford Tigers in the Super League.

== Background ==
Sanderson came through the junior ranks at Hull FC before joining Cas.

== Career ==
=== 2020 ===
On 7 Mar 2020 it was reported that he had signed for the Castleford Tigers in the Super League.

Sanderson made his Super League debut in round 13 of the 2020 Super League season for the Tigers against the Huddersfield Giants, Sanderson scored a try and became Castleford Heritage player #1000.

=== 2021 ===
Sanderson joined the Bradford Bulls on a 1 year deal.

=== Doncaster R.L.F.C. ===
On 30 Nov 2021 it was reported that he had signed for Doncaster R.L.F.C. in the RFL League 1
