= Levy Nzoungou =

Congolese rugby league player

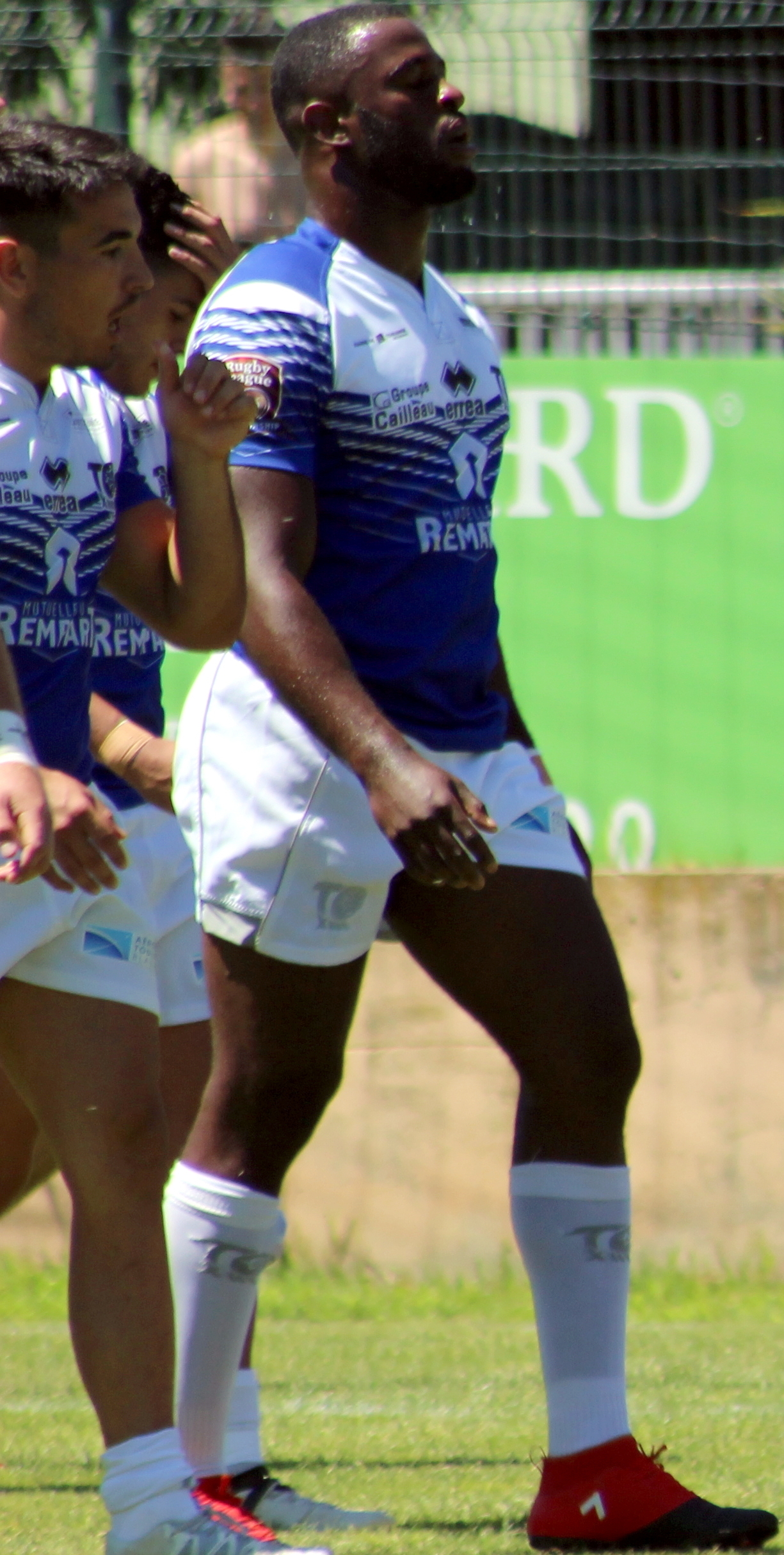

Personal information
- Born: 22 January 1998 (age 28) Brazzaville, Congo
- Height: 6 ft 1 in (1.86 m)
- Weight: 16 st 5 lb (104 kg)

Playing information
- Position: Prop
Club
Years	Team	Pld	T	G	FG	P
2015–16	St Helens
2017	Melbourne Storm
2017	Toulouse Olympique	8	0	0	0	0
2018	Salford Red Devils	3	0	0	0	0
2018(loan)	→ Oldham	2	0	0	0	0
2018(loan)	→ Whitehaven	2	0	0	0	0
2018(loan)	→ Swinton Lions	5	0	0	0	0
2019	Hull F.C.	1	0	0	0	0
2019(loan)	→ Doncaster	12	1	0	0	4
2019	Albi Tigers	4	0	0	0	0
2020–21	Bradford Bulls	10	1	0	0	4
2022–22	Widnes Vikings	0	0	0	0	0
2024–	North Wales Crusaders	6	1	0	0	4
	Total	53	3	0	0	12
- Source: As of 9 August 2026

Levy Nzoungou (born 22 January 1998) is a professional rugby league footballer who plays as a prop for North Wales Crusaders in the RFL Championship and previously with Albi XIII.

He spent time with St Helens and Melbourne Storm, playing with Toulouse Olympique in the Championship, Salford Red Devils in the Super League, and on loan from Salford at Oldham and the Swinton Lions in the Championship and Whitehaven in League 1. He has played for Hull F.C. in the Super League, and spent time on loan from Hull at Doncaster League 1.

== Early life ==
Nzoungou was born in Brazzaville, Congo and moved to France at age 8.

== Career ==
=== St Helens ===
After impressing for France at junior level, Nzoungou signed with St. Helens and was a star player for their Under-19s academy team, later joining Melbourne Storm to play in the NRL Under-20s. After a very brief spell with Melbourne ended without playing a game in the 2017 NRL Under-20s season,

=== Toulouse Olympique ===
He returned to France and joined Toulouse Olympique on a short-term deal, making his professional debut in the Championship in 2017 against the Rochdale Hornets.

=== Salford Red Devils ===
In 2018, he joined Salford Red Devils and made his Super League debut against the Wigan Warriors. He also spent time on loan at Oldham, Whitehaven and Swinton Lions.

=== Hull FC ===
He joined Hull F.C. in September 2018, signing a two-year deal.

=== Bradford Bulls ===
Nzoungou signed for the Bradford Bulls for the 2020 season, however due to the season being cancelled due to COVID-19, he signed a one-year extension.

=== Widnes Vikings ===
In 2022, without being able to play a game for Widnes Vikings and having retired from rugby after a number of serious injuries including a snapped Achilles tendon, Nzoungou trained as a firefighter and joined Cheshire Fire and Rescue Service.

=== North Wales Crusaders ===
On 28 December 2023 it was reported that he had signed for North Wales Crusaders in the RFL League 1 on a 1-year deal.

On 4 August 2026 it was reported that he had re-joined the club until the end of the 2026 season
