= Adam Rooks =

English professional rugby league footballer

Personal information
- Full name: Adam Rooks
- Born: 15 January 2000 (age 26) Kingston upon Hull, East Riding of Yorkshire, England
- Height: 182 cm (6 ft 0 in)
- Weight: 95 kg (14 st 13 lb)

Playing information
- Position: Second-row, Loose forward, Centre, Prop
Club
Years	Team	Pld	T	G	FG	P
2019–20	Hull Kingston Rovers	7	0	0	0	0
2020	→ Bradford Bulls (loan)	5	1	0	0	4
2021–	Bradford Bulls	14	2	0	0	8
	Total	26	3	0	0	12
- Source: As of 25 September 2021

Adam Rooks (born 15 January 2000) is an English professional rugby league footballer who plays in the second-row for Bradford Bulls in the RFL Championship.

== Background ==
Rooks was born in Kingston upon Hull, East Riding of Yorkshire, England. Rooks played for Holderness Vikings Skirlaugh and East Hull, along with England against France and Wales, winning both. Rooks changed from the terraces to the pitch with Hull Kingston Rovers as he and his family are big supporters of the team, from his grandmother to his little sister they all have a passion for the club. Rugby all started off because of his father getting him into it at a very young age, edging him in to join the club Holderness Vikings; since then, he fell in love with it and decided that was what he wanted to do with his life. He was scouted after moving from Skirlaugh ARLFC to East Hull and then on to the City Of Hull Academy which before that he represented his country against Wales and France, playing for England's under 15's and 16's. Rooks played his amateur rugby league for East Hull and the Skirlaugh Bulls, going onto then become a product of the City of Hull Academy System,} along with being in the under 15's and 16's for England. Rooks has represented his home county of Yorkshire at Origin level and the England Academy Squad at international level.

== Senior career ==
=== Hull Kingston Rovers ===
In July 2018, Rooks signed a two-year contract to play for Hull Kingston Rovers in the Super League. Rooks made his Hull Kingston Rovers début at the age of 19 on 17 March 2019, in a 16-18 round 7 Super League defeat against the Catalans Dragons at Craven Park. Rooks was sent on loan for a season to Bradford scoring twice.
