= 2013 Huddersfield Giants season =

- Super League XVIII Rank: 1st – Leaders
- Play-off result: semi-final
- Challenge Cup: quarter-final
- 2013 record: Wins: 24; draws: 0; losses: 8
- Points scored: For: 1010; against: 611

Team information
- Chairman: Ken Davy
- Head Coach: Paul Anderson
- Captain: Danny Brough
- Stadium: John Smith's Stadium

Top scorers
- Tries: Shaun Lunt – 23
- Goals: Danny Brough – 153
- Points: Danny Brough – 334
← 2012	List of seasons	2014 →

This article details the Huddersfield Giants rugby league football club's 2013 season. This was the 18th season of the Super League era.

== Pre season friendlies ==
LEGEND
Win
Draw
Loss

Giants score is first.

Date	Competition	Vrs	H/A	Venue	Result	Score	Tries	Goals	Att	Report
11 January 2013	Pre Season	Saints	A	Langtree Park	L	0–26	–	–	Attendance	Report
20 January 2013	Pre Season	Vikings	H	John Smith's Stadium	W	36–12	Lunt (3), Cudjoe (2), Wardle	Brough 6/6	N/A	Report

== Player appearances ==
- Friendly Games Only

FB=Fullback	C=Centre	W=Winger	SO=Stand Off	SH=Scrum half	P=Prop	H=Hooker	SR=Second Row	LF=Loose forward	B=Bench

No	Player	1	2
1	Scott Grix	FB	FB
2	Luke George	W	W
3	Leroy Cudjoe	C	C
4	Joe Wardle	B	C
5	Jermaine McGillvary	x	W
6	Danny Brough	SO	SO
7	Luke Robinson	SH	SH
8	Eorl Crabtree	x	P
9	Shaun Lunt	B	H
10	Craig Kopczak	P	B
11	Brett Ferres	x	SR
12	Luke O'Donnell	x	x
13	David Faiumu	H	B
14	Michael Lawrence	L	L
15	Larne Patrick	P	B
16	Jason Chan	SR	x
17	Ukuma Ta'ai	x	x
18	Aaron Murphy	C	B
19	Jamie Cording	SR	B
20	Jacob Fairbank	x	B
21	Dale Ferguson	B	SR
22	Anthony Mullally	B	B
23	Matthew Dawson	W	x
24	Josh Johnson	B	x
25	Peter Aspinall	B	x
26	Nathan Mason	B	x
27	Ben Blackmore	B	x
28	Jake Connor	B	x
29	Stuart Fielden	x	P

= Injured

= Suspended

== Table ==
Super League XVIII
Pos	Team	Pld	W	D	L	PF	PA	PD	Pts	Qualification
1	Huddersfield Giants (L)	27	21	0	6	851	507	+344	42	Play-offs
2	Warrington Wolves	27	20	1	6	836	461	+375	41	Play-offs
3	Leeds Rhinos	27	18	1	8	712	507	+205	37	Play-offs
4	Wigan Warriors (C)	27	17	1	9	816	460	+356	35	Play-offs
5	St. Helens	27	15	1	11	678	536	+142	31	Play-offs
6	Hull F.C.	27	13	2	12	652	563	+89	28	Play-offs
7	Catalans Dragons	27	13	2	12	619	604	+15	28	Play-offs
8	Hull Kingston Rovers	27	13	0	14	642	760	−118	26	Play-offs
9	Bradford Bulls	27	10	2	15	640	658	−18	22	
10	Widnes Vikings	27	10	2	15	695	841	−146	22	
11	Wakefield Trinity Wildcats	27	10	1	16	660	749	−89	21	
12	Castleford Tigers	27	9	2	16	702	881	−179	20	
13	London Broncos	27	5	2	20	487	946	−459	12	
14	Salford City Reds	27	6	1	20	436	953	−517	11 (Note: Salford deducted 2 points on 14 June 2013 for fielding 14 players during home game against Castleford)	

Source: superleague.co.uk and BBC Sport
Rules for classification: 1st on competition points; 2nd on match points difference. Competition points: for win = 2; for draw = 1; for loss = 0.
(C) Champions; (L) League Leaders' Shield Winners

== 2013 fixtures and results ==
LEGEND
Win
Draw
Loss

2013 Engage Super League

Date	Competition	Rnd	Vrs	H/A	Venue	Result	Score	Tries	Goals	Att	Live on TV	Report
2 February 2013	Super League XVIII	1	Saints	A	Langtree Park	W	40–4	McGillvary, Ferres, Cudjoe (2), George, Patrick, Lunt	Brough 5/6, Grix 1/4	12,003	Sky Sports	Report
10 February 2013	Super League XVIII	2	Broncos	H	John Smith's Stadium	W	34–6	Crabtree, Lunt (2), Kopczak, Ferres, Wardle	Brough 5/6	5,273	–	Report
17 February 2013	Super League XVIII	3	Warriors	H	John Smith's Stadium	W	22–10	McGillvary, Cording, Ferres	Brough 5/5	8,023	–	Report
24 February 2013	Super League XVIII	4	Wakefield Trinity Wildcats	A	Belle Vue	W	18–16	McGillvary (3)	Brough 3/5	8,467	–	Report
3 March 2013	Super League XVIII	5	Bulls	H	John Smith's Stadium	L	18–43	Wardle, Faiumu, Lunt	Grix 3/4	7,616	–	Report
8 March 2013	Super League XVIII	6	Rhinos	A	Headingley Stadium	W	32–8	Wardle, Murphy (2), Grix, Brough, Crabtree	Brough 4/7	15,013	–	Report
16 March 2013	Super League XVIII	7	Hull FC	H	John Smith's Stadium	W	24–10	Lunt, Murphy, Wardle, Grix	Brough 4/5	5,536	Sky Sports	Report
22 March 2013	Super League XVIII	8	Wolves	A	Halliwell Jones Stadium	L	2–28	–	Brough 1/1	9,797	–	Report
29 March 2013	Super League XVIII	9	Salford City Reds	A	City of Salford Stadium	L	20–21	Lunt, McGillvary, Kopczak, Brough	Brough 2/4	4,500	–	Report
1 April 2013	Super League XVIII	10	Vikings	H	John Smith's Stadium	W	62–6	Murphy (3), Grix (2), Brough, Lawrence, George, Cording, McGillvary, Lunt	Brough 9/11	4,270	–	Report
5 April 2013	Super League XVIII	11	Tigers	A	The Jungle	W	40–24	Lunt, Wardle, Murphy, McGillvary (2), Robinson, Ferres	Brough 6/7	3,222	Sky Sports	Report
14 April 2013	Super League XVIII	12	Hull Kingston Rovers	H	John Smith's Stadium	W	50–30	Kopczak, Lawrence, Lunt (2), Wardle (2), Grix, Ferres	Brough 9/9	5,641	–	Report
27 April 2013	Super League XVIII	13	Dragons	A	Stade Gilbert Brutus	W	28–20	Wardle (2), Murphy, Cudjoe, Lunt	Brough 4/5	Attendance	–	Report
5 May 2013	Super League XVIII	14	Wolves	H	John Smith's Stadium	L	12–34	McGillvary, Leeming	Brough 2/2	8,585	–	Report
17 May 2013	Super League XVIII	15	Vikings	A	Halton Stadium	W	36–22	Ferres (2), Brough, Patrick (2), Murphy	Brough 5/5, Grix 1/1	5,173	–	Report
25 May 2013	Magic Weekend	16	Bulls	N	Etihad Stadium	W	42–6	Ferguson (2), Grix, Patrick, Lunt, Ferres, Mullally	Brough 7/7	31,249	Sky Sports	Report
3 June 2013	Super League XVIII	17	Saints	H	John Smith's Stadium	W	25–16	Murphy, Wardle (2), Ferguson	Brough 4/5, Brough 1 DG	5,203	Sky Sports	Report
7 June 2013	Super League XVIII	18	Hull Kingston Rovers	A	Craven Park	L	28–35	Cudjoe (2), Wardle, Lunt, Murphy	Brough 4/5	6,963	–	Report
23 June 2013	Super League XVIII	19	Rhinos	H	John Smith's Stadium	W	40–18	Robinson, Lunt (2), Murphy, Ferres, Cudjoe, Grix	Brough 6/7	7,756	–	Report
28 June 2013	Super League XVIII	20	Dragons	H	John Smith's Stadium	W	60–16	Ferres (3), Murphy, McGillvary (3), George, Lunt, Cudjoe	Brough 10/11	5,052	Sky Sports	Report
7 July 2013	Super League XVIII	21	Hull FC	A	KC Stadium	W	22–16	Wardle, Ta'ai, McGillvary, Brough	Brough 3/4	10,986	–	Report
21 July 2013	Super League XVIII	22	Tigers	H	John Smith's Stadium	W	48–32	Wardle, Brough, Blackmore (2), Murphy (2), Cudjoe, Wood	Brough 8/8	5,733	–	Report
4 August 2013	Super League XVIII	23	Salford City Reds	H	John Smith's Stadium	W	46–4	McGillvary (2), Faiumu, Ferres, Wardle, Brough, Cording (2)	Brough 6/7, Wardle 1/1	5,345	–	Report
9 August 2013	Super League XVIII	24	Warriors	A	DW Stadium	W	30–12	Murphy (2), Chan, Ferres, Grix	Brough 5/8	19,620	Sky Sports	Report
17 August 2013	Super League XVIII	25	Broncos	A	Twickenham Stoop	W	26–12	Murphy, Ta'ai, Crabtree, Ferguson	Brough 3/3, Grix 2/2	2,013	–	Report
1 September 2013	Super League XVIII	26	Wakefield Trinity Wildcats	H	John Smith's Stadium	W	40–0	Chan (2), Ferres, Murphy, McGillvary (2), Lunt	Brough 6/7	8,757	Sky Sports	Report
8 September 2013	Super League XVIII	27	Bulls	A	Odsal Stadium	L	6–58	Connor	Miller 1/1	8,348	Sky Sports	Report

== Player appearances ==
- Super League Only

FB=Fullback	C=Centre	W=Winger	SO=Stand-off	SH=Scrum half	PR=Prop	H=Hooker	SR=Second Row	L=Loose forward	B=Bench

No	Player	1	2	3	4	5	6	7	8	9	10	11	12	13	14	15	16	17	18	19	20	21	22	23	24	25	26	27
1	Scott Grix	FB	FB	FB	FB	SO	FB	FB	FB	FB	FB	FB	FB	FB	FB	FB	FB	FB	FB	FB	FB	FB	FB	FB	FB	FB	FB	x
2	Luke George	W	W	x	x	W	x	x	x	x	B	B	x	x	x	x	x	x	x	x	W	x	x	x	x	x	x	C
3	Leroy Cudjoe	C	C	C	C	C	C	C	C	C	C	C	C	C	C	C	C	C	C	C	C	C	C	C	C	C	C	x
4	Joe Wardle	C	C	C	C	C	C	C	C	C	C	C	C	C	x	x	x	C	C	C	x	C	C	C	C	C	C	x
5	Jermaine McGillvary	W	W	W	W	W	x	W	W	W	W	W	W	W	W	W	W	W	W	W	W	W	x	W	W	W	W	x
6	Danny Brough	SO	SO	SO	SO	x	SO	SO	SO	SO	SO	SO	SO	SO	SO	SO	SO	SO	SO	SO	SO	SO	SO	SO	SO	SO	SO	x
7	Luke Robinson	SH	SH	SH	SH	SH	SH	SH	SH	SH	SH	SH	SH	SH	SH	SH	SH	SH	SH	SH	SH	SH	SH	SH	SH	SH	SH	x
8	Eorl Crabtree	B	L	B	P	P	P	P	B	P	P	x	P	B	B	P	P	P	P	B	B	P	P	P	P	P	P	x
9	Shaun Lunt	H	H	B	H	B	H	H	H	H	H	H	H	H	H	H	H	H	H	H	H	H	x	x	H	x	H	x
10	Craig Kopczak	P	P	P	x	P	B	B	P	P	B	P	P	P	P	P	P	P	P	P	P	P	P	x	P	P	P	x
11	Brett Ferres	SR	SR	SR	SR	SR	SR	SR	SR	SR	SR	SR	SR	SR	x	C	C	SR	SR	SR	SR	SR	SR	SR	SR	SR	SR	x
12	Luke O'Donnell	L	x	x	x	x	x	x	x	x	x	x	x	x	x	x	x	x	x	x	x	x	x	x	x	x	x	x
13	David Faiumu	B	B	H	B	H	B	L	B	B	B	B	B	B	x	B	x	x	B	B	B	B	B	B	B	B	B	H
14	Michael Lawrence		x	x	x	x	x	x	x	x	SR	SR	SR	L	L	x	x	B	L	L	L	L	B	SR	SR	SR	L	C
15	Larne Patrick	B	B	B	B	B	B	B	B	x	P	B	B	P	P	B	B	B	x	P	P	P	B	B	B	B	B	x
16	Jason Chan	SR	SR	SR	SR	SR	SR	x	x	x	x	x	x	x	SR	SR	SR	x	x	x	x	x	x	x	B	B	SR	x
17	Ukuma Ta'ai	x	B	x	x	L	B	B	x	x	x	x	x	B	B	SR	SR	SR	SR	SR	B	B	SR	B	x	B	B	SR
18	Aaron Murphy		x	W	W	FB	W	W	W	W	W	W	W	W	C	W	W	W	W	W	C	W	W	W	W	W	W	x
19	Jamie Cording	B	B	B	B	B	x	B	B	x	B	B	B	x	x	B	B	x	x	B	B	B	x	L	x	x	x	SR
20	Jacob Fairbank	x	x	L	L	x	x	x	L	B	x	x	x	x	x	x	x	x	x	x	x	x	x	x	x	x	x	L
21	Dale Ferguson	x	x	x	x	x	L	SR	SR	L	L	L	L	SR	SR	L	L	L	B	B	SR	SR	L	x	L	L	x	x
22	Athony Mullally		x	x	B	B	x	x	x	B	x	x	x	x	B	x	B	B	B	x	x	x	B	x	x	x	x	P
23	Matthew Dawson	x	x	x	x	x	W	x	x	x	x	x	x	x	W	x	x	x	x	x	x	x	x	x	x	x	x	W
24	Josh Johnson	x	x	x	x	x	x	x	x	x	x	x	x	x	x	x	x	x	x	x	x	x	x	B	x	x	x	P
25	Peter Aspinall	x	x	x	x	x	x	x	x	SR	x	x	x	x	x	x	x	x	x	x	x	x	x	x	x	x	x	B
26	Nathan Mason	x	x	x	x	x	x	x	x	x	x	x	x	x	x	x	x	x	x	x	x	x	x	x	x	x	x	B
27	Ben Blackmore	x	x	x	x	x	x	x	x	x	x	x	x	x	x	x	x	x	x	x	x	x	W	x	x	x	x	W
28	Jake Connor	x	x	x	x	x	x	x	x	x	x	x	x	x	x	x	x	x	x	x	x	x	x	x	x	x	x	FB
29	Stuart Fielden	P	P	P	P	x	P	P	P	B	x	P	x	x	x	x	x	x	x	x	x	x	x	x	x	x	x	x
30	Brad Dwyer	x	x	x	x	x	x	x	x	x	x	x	B	B	x	B	B	B	B	x	x	x	x	x	x	x	x	x
31	Kruise Leeming	x	x	x	x	x	x	x	x	x	x	x	x	x	B	x	x	x	x	x	x	x	x	x	x	x	x	B
32	Kyle Wood	x	x	x	x	x	x	x	x	x	x	x	x	x	x	x	x	x	x	x	x	B	H	H	B	H	B	SO
34	Jack Miller	x	x	x	x	x	x	x	x	x	x	x	x	x	x	x	x	x	x	x	x	x	x	x	x	x	x	SH
35	Jack Blagbrough	x	x	x	x	x	x	x	x	x	x	x	x	x	x	x	x	x	x	x	x	x	x	x	x	x	x	B

= Injured

= Suspended

== Challenge Cup ==
LEGEND
Win
Draw
Loss

Date	Competition	Rnd	Vrs	H/A	Venue	Result	Score	Tries	Goals	Att	TV	Report
21 April 2013	Cup	4th	Bulldogs	A	Mount Pleasant	W	13–4	Lunt (2)	Brough 2/3, Brough 1 DG	2,067	–	Report
11 May 2013	Cup	5th	Rhinos	H	John Smith's Stadium	W	24–8	Lunt, Wardle, Cudjoe (2)	Brough 4/6	11,389	BBC Sport	Report
14 July 2013	Cup	QF	Wolves	A	Halliwell Jones Stadium	L	24–44	Lunt, Ferguson, McGillvary, Grix	Brough 4/4	7,603	BBC Sport	Report

== Player appearances ==
- Challenge Cup Games only

FB=Fullback	C=Centre	W=Winger	SO=Stand Off	SH=Scrum half	P=Prop	H=Hooker	SR=Second Row	L=Loose forward	B=Bench

No	Player	4	5	QF
1	Scott Grix	SO	FB	FB
2	Luke George	x	x	x
3	Leroy Cudjoe	W	C	C
4	Joe Wardle	C	C	C
5	Jermaine McGillvary	W	W	W
6	Danny Brough	SH	SO	SO
7	Luke Robinson	x	SH	SH
8	Eorl Crabtree	P	P	B
9	Shaun Lunt	H	H	H
10	Craig Kopczak	P	P	P
11	Brett Ferres	SR	SR	SR
13	David Faiumu	B	B	B
14	Michael Lawrence	SR	x	L
15	Larne Patrick	B	B	P
16	Jason Chan	x	SR	x
17	Ukuma Ta'ai	B	B	SR
18	Aaron Murphy	FB	W	W
19	Jamie Cording	L	B	x
20	Jacob Fairbank	x	x	x
21	Dale Ferguson	x	L	B
22	Anthony Mullally	x	x	B
23	Matthew Dawson	C	x	x
24	Josh Johnson	B	x	x
25	Peter Aspinall	x	x	x
26	Nathan Mason	x	x	x
27	Ben Blackmore	x	x	x
28	Jake Connor	x	x	x
29	Stuart Fielden	x	x	x

== Playoffs ==
LEGEND
Win
Draw
Loss

Date	Competition	Rnd	Vrs	H/A	Venue	Result	Score	Tries	Goals	Att	TV	Report
12 September 2013	Play-offs	QPO	Warriors	H	John Smith's Stadium	L	8–22	Brough	Brough 2/3	8,000	Sky Sports	Report
19 September 2013	Play-offs	PSF	Hull FC	H	John Smith's Stadium	W	76–18	Cudjoe (2), Robinson (4), Grix (2), Murphy, Lunt (2), Ferres, Kopczak	Brough 12/13	5,547	Sky Sports	Report
26 September 2013	Play-offs	SF	Wolves	A	Halliwell Jones Stadium	L	22–30	Brough, Connor, McGillvary, Ferguson	Brough 3/4	10,042	Sky Sports	Report

== Player appearances ==
- Play-off Games only

FB=Fullback	C=Centre	W=Winger	SO=Stand Off	SH=Scrum half	P=Prop	H=Hooker	SR=Second Row	L=Loose forward	B=Bench

No	Player	QPO	PSF	SF
1	Scott Grix	FB	FB	x
2	Luke George	x	x	x
3	Leroy Cudjoe	C	C	C
4	Joe Wardle	C	C	C
5	Jermaine McGillvary	W	W	W
6	Danny Brough	SO	SO	SO
7	Luke Robinson	SH	SH	SH
8	Eorl Crabtree	P	P	P
9	Shaun Lunt	H	H	H
10	Craig Kopczak	P	P	P
11	Brett Ferres	SR	SR	SR
13	David Faiumu	B	x	x
14	Michael Lawrence	B	L	L
15	Larne Patrick	B	B	B
16	Jason Chan	SR	SR	SR
17	Ukumu Ta'ai	x	B	B
18	Aaron Murphy	W	W	W
19	Jamie Cording	x	x	x
20	Jacob Fairbank	x	x	x
21	Dale Ferguson	L	B	B
22	Anthony Mullally	x	x	x
23	Matthew Dawson	x	x	x
24	Josh Johnson	x	x	x
25	Peter Aspinall	x	x	x
26	Nathan Mason	x	x	x
27	Ben Blackmore	x	x	x
28	Jake Connor	x	x	FB
31	Kruise Leeming	x	x	x
32	Kyle Wood	B	B	B
34	Jack Miller	x	x	x
35	Jack Blagbrough	x	x	x

== 2013 squad statistics ==
- Appearances and points include (Super League, Challenge Cup and Play-offs) as of 28 September 2013.

No	Player	Position	Previous club	Until End Of	Apps	Tries	Goals	DG	Points
1	Scott Grix	Fullback	Wakefield Trinity Wildcats	2013	31	11	7	0	58
2	Luke George	Wing	Wakefield Trinity Wildcats	2013	7	3	0	0	12
3	Leroy Cudjoe	Centre	Huddersfield Giants	2013	33	12	0	0	48
4	Joe Wardle	Centre	Bradford Bulls	2013	28	16	1	0	66
5	Jermaine McGillvary	Wing	Huddersfield Giants	2013	30	20	0	0	80
6	Danny Brough	Stand Off	Wakefield Trinity Wildcats	2013	31	9	153	2	334
7	Luke Robinson	Scrum-half	Salford City Reds	2013	31	6	0	0	24
8	Eorl Crabtree	Prop	Huddersfield Giants	2013	31	3	0	0	12
9	Shaun Lunt	Hooker	Workington Town	2013	29	23	0	0	92
10	Craig Kopczak	Prop	Bradford Bulls	2013	30	4	0	0	16
11	Brett Ferres	Second Row	Castleford Tigers	2013	31	16	0	0	64
12	Luke O'Donnell	Second Row	North Queensland Cowboys	2013	1	0	0	0	0
13	David Faiumu	Loose forward	North Queensland Cowboys	2013	28	2	0	0	8
14	Michael Lawrence	Wing	Huddersfield Giants	2013	21	2	0	0	8
15	Larne Patrick	Prop	Huddersfield Giants	2013	30	4	0	0	16
16	Jason Chan	Second Row	Crusaders	2013	16	3	0	0	12
17	Ukuma Ta'ai	Prop	New Zealand Warriors	2013	23	2	0	0	8
18	Aaron Murphy	Wing	Wakefield Trinity Wildcats	2013	30	20	0	0	80
19	Jamie Cording	Second Row	Castleford Tigers	2013	19	4	0	0	16
20	Jacob Fairbank	Loose forward	Huddersfield Giants	2013	5	0	0	0	0
21	Dale Ferguson	Prop	Wakefield Trinity Wildcats	2013	24	6	0	0	24
22	Anthony Mullally	Prop	Widnes Vikings	2013	10	1	0	0	4
23	Matty Dawson	Wing	Huddersfield Giants	2013	4	0	0	0	0
24	Josh Johnson	Prop	Huddersfield Giants	2013	3	0	0	0	0
25	Peter Aspinall	Second Row	Huddersfield Giants	2013	2	0	0	0	0
26	Nathan Mason	Prop	Huddersfield Giants	2013	1	0	0	0	0
27	Ben Blackmore	Wing	Huddersfield Giants	2013	2	2	0	0	8
28	Jake Connor	Stand Off	Huddersfield Giants	2013	2	2	0	0	8
29	Stuart Fielden	Prop	Wigan Warriors	2013	9	0	0	0	0
30	Brad Dwyer	Hooker	Warrington Wolves – Loan	2013	6	0	0	0	0
31	Kruise Leeming	Hooker	Huddersfield Giants	2013	2	1	0	0	4
32	Kyle Wood	Scrum-half	Wakefield Trinity Wildcats	2013	10	1	0	0	4
34	Jack Miller	Scrum-half	Huddersfield Giants	2013	1	0	1	0	2
35	Jack Blagbrough	Prop	Huddersfield Giants	2013	1	0	0	0	0

= Injured = Suspended

== Out of contract 2013 ==
Players out of contract in 2013:

== 2013 transfers in/out ==
In

Name	Position	Signed from	Date
Brett Ferres	Second Row	Castleford Tigers	July 2012
Anthony Mullally	Prop	Widnes Vikings	July 2012
Ukuma Ta'ai	Prop	New Zealand Warriors	September 2012
Craig Kopczak	Prop	Bradford Bulls	September 2012
Ben Blackmore	Wing	Castleford Tigers	September 2012
Stuart Fielden	Prop	Wigan Warriors	October 2012

Out

Name	Position	Club Signed	Date
Kevin Brown	Stand Off	Widnes Vikings	May 2012
Tony Tonks	Prop	Halifax	July 2012
Lee Gilmour	Second Row	Castleford Tigers	June 2012
Tommy Lee	Hooker	London Broncos	September 2012
David Fa'alogo	Second Row	Newcastle Knights	September 2012
Adam Walker	Prop	Hull Kingston Rovers	November 2012
Scott Moore	Hooker	North Queensland Cowboys	November 2012
Greg Eden	Fullback	Hull Kingston Rovers	November 2012
Keith Mason	Prop	Castleford Tigers	December 2012
