= 2015 Huddersfield Giants season =

- Play-off result: Semi-finals
- Challenge Cup: 6th round

Team information
- Chairman: Ken Davy
- Head Coach: Paul Anderson
- Captain: Danny Brough
- Stadium: John Smith's Stadium
← 2014	List of seasons	2016 →

This article details the Huddersfield Giants rugby league football club's 2015 season. This was the 20th season of the Super League era.

== Results ==
=== Pre-season friendlies ===
W Win D Draw L Loss

Pre-season results
Date	Versus	H/A	Venue	Result	Score	Tries	Goals	Attendance	Report
7 February	London Broncos	A	The Garrison Stadium	W	40–4	Noi (2), Wood, McComb, Leeming, Brown, Farrell	Farrell 6/7	N/A	Report

=== Super League ===
==== League table ====
Pos	Team	Pld	W	D	L	PF	PA	PD	Pts	Qualification
1	Leeds Rhinos	23	16	1	6	758	477	+281	33	Super League Super 8s
2	St Helens	23	16	0	7	598	436	+162	32	Super League Super 8s
3	Wigan Warriors	23	15	1	7	589	413	+176	31	Super League Super 8s
4	Huddersfield Giants	23	13	2	8	538	394	+144	28	Super League Super 8s
5	Castleford Tigers	23	13	0	10	547	505	+42	26	Super League Super 8s
6	Warrington Wolves	23	12	0	11	552	456	+96	24	Super League Super 8s
7	Hull F.C.	23	11	0	12	452	484	−32	22	Super League Super 8s
8	Catalans Dragons	23	9	2	12	561	574	−13	20	Super League Super 8s
9	Widnes Vikings	23	9	1	13	518	565	−47	19	The Qualifiers
10	Hull Kingston Rovers	23	9	0	14	534	646	−112	18	The Qualifiers
11	Salford Red Devils	23	8	1	14	447	617	−170	17	The Qualifiers
12	Wakefield Trinity Wildcats	23	3	0	20	402	929	−527	6	The Qualifiers

Source: Rugby League Project
Rules for classification: 1) Points; 2) Points difference; 3) Number of points scored;

==== Super League results ====
W Win D Draw L Loss

Super League results
Date	Round	Versus	H/A	Venue	Result	Score	Tries	Goals	Attendance	Report
8 February	1	Hull F.C.	H	John Smith's Stadium	L	0-19			7,737	Report
13 February	2	Wigan Warriors	A	DW Stadium	L	16-24	Mullally, Ellis, Murphy	Brough 2/3	12,448	Report
26 February	3	Leeds Rhinos	A	Headingley Carnegie Stadium	L	24-28	Ellis, Wardle, Wood, Ferres	Brough 4/4	12,878	Report
6 March	4	Widnes Vikings	H	John Smith's Stadium	W	24-12	Grix, McGillvary, Wardle (2), Crabtree	Brough 2/5	5,452	Report
12 March	5	Castleford Tigers	H	John Smith's Stadium	W	22-0	Ellis, Ta'ai, Murphy, McGillvary	Brough 3/4	5,257	Report
22 March	6	Wakefield Trinity Wildcats	A	Belle Vue	W	44-14	Grix (3), Ferres, Brough, Cudjoe, Ta'ai	Brough 6/6, Ellis 2/2	4,354	Report
27 March	7	Warrington Wolves	A	Halliwell Jones Stadium	W	29-10	Ellis, Murphy (2), McGillvary, Crabtree	Brough 4/5, Brough 1 DG	9,019	Report
3 April	8	Salford Red Devils	H	John Smith's Stadium	L	12-18	Hughes, Murphy	Brough 2/2	6,003	Report
6 April	9	Hull Kingston Rovers	A	Craven Park	L	16-20	Wardle, Ta'ai, Murphy	Brough 2/3	7,827	Report
12 April	10	St Helens	H	John Smith's Stadium	L	8-11				RLP
19 April	11	Catalans Dragons	H	John Smith's Stadium	W	38-14				RLP
24 April	12	Hull F.C.	A	KC Stadium	W	24-4				RLP
30 April	13	Leeds Rhinos	H	John Smith's Stadium	D	24-24				RLP
8 May	14	Salford Red Devils	A	AJ Bell Stadium	W	19-0				RLP
21 May	15	Castleford Tigers	A	Mend-A-Hose Jungle	W	24-16				RLP
31 May	16	Catalans Dragons	N	St James' Park	D	22-22				RLP
7 June	17	Wigan Warriors	H	John Smith's Stadium	L	18-32				RLP
14 June	18	Warrington Wolves	H	John Smith's Stadium	W	30-19				RLP
21 June	19	Widnes Vikings	A	Halton Stadium	L	30-22				RLP
5 July	20	Hull Kingston Rovers	H	John Smith's Stadium	W	32-14				RLP
10 July	21	St Helens	A	Langtree Park	L	34-35				RLP
18 July	22	Catalans Dragons	A	Stade Gilbert Brutus	W	14-12				RLP
26 July	23	Wakefield Trinity Wildcats	H	John Smith's Stadium	W	34-24				RLP

=== Super 8s ===
==== Super 8s table ====
Pos	Team	Pld	W	D	L	PF	PA	PD	Pts	Qualification
1	Leeds Rhinos (L, C)	30	20	1	9	944	650	+294	41	Semi-finals
2	Wigan Warriors	30	20	1	9	798	530	+268	41	Semi-finals
3	Huddersfield Giants	30	18	2	10	750	534	+216	38	Semi-finals
4	St Helens	30	19	0	11	766	624	+142	38	Semi-finals
5	Castleford Tigers	30	16	0	14	731	746	−15	32	
6	Warrington Wolves	30	15	0	15	714	636	+78	30	
7	Catalans Dragons	30	13	2	15	739	770	−31	28	
8	Hull F.C.	30	12	0	18	620	716	−96	24	

Source: Rugby League Project
(C) Champions; (L) League Leaders' Shield Winners

==== Super 8s results ====
Super 8's results
Date	Round	Versus	H/A	Venue	Result	Score	Tries	Goals	Attendance	Report
6 August	S1	Wigan Warriors	A	DW Stadium	L	22-30				RLP
14 August	S2	Catalans Dragons	H	John Smith's Stadium	W	24-12				RLP
20 August	S3	St Helens	A	Langtree Park	W	28-22				RLP
3 September	S4	Castleford Tigers	H	John Smith's Stadium	W	40-26				RLP
13 September	S5	Warrington Wolves	H	John Smith's Stadium	W	48-10				RLP
18 September	S6	Hull F.C.	A	KC Stadium	W	34-20				RLP
25 September	S7	Leeds Rhinos	H	John Smith's Stadium	L	16-20				RLP

==== Play-offs ====
Play-off results
Date	Round	Versus	H/A	Venue	Result	Score	Tries	Goals	Attendance	Report
1 October	Semi-final	Wigan Warriors	A	DW Stadium	L	8-32				RLP

=== Challenge Cup ===
Challenge Cup results
Date	Round	Versus	H/A	Venue	Result	Score	Tries	Goals	Attendance	Report
16 May	6	Leeds Rhinos	A	Headingley Carnegie Stadium	L	16-48				RLP

== Players ==
=== Transfers ===
==== Ins ====
List of players joining Huddersfield
Name	Signed from	Contract	Date
Craig Huby	Castleford Tigers	4 Years	September 2014
Jamie Ellis	Castleford Tigers	2 Years	October 2014
Oliver Roberts	Bradford Bulls	2 Years	October 2014
Jack Hughes	Wigan Warriors	1 Year Loan	November 2014
Jordan Cox	Hull Kingston Rovers	1 Month Loan	April 2015

==== Outs ====
List of players leaving Huddersfield
Name	Signed for	Contract	Date
Ben Blackmore	Featherstone Rovers	1 ½ Years	June 2014
Jason Chan	Australia	1 Year	August 2014
David Faiumu	Retired		September 2014
Peter Aspinall	York City Knights	2 Years	October 2014
Antonio Kaufusi	Canterbury Bulldogs	2 Years	November 2014
Larne Patrick	Wigan Warriors	1 Year Loan	November 2014
Jack Miller	Released	N/A	December 2014
Jacob Fairbank	Halifax	1 Month Loan	February 2015
Shaun Lunt	Hull Kingston Rovers	1 Year Loan	March 2015
