= 2014 Huddersfield Giants season =

- Super League rank: 3rd
- Play-off result: Preliminary semi-final
- Challenge Cup: 4th Round

Team information
- Chairman: Ken Davy
- Head Coach: Paul Anderson
- Captain: Danny Brough
- Stadium: John Smith's Stadium
← 2013	List of seasons	2015 →

This article details the Huddersfield Giants rugby league football club's 2014 season. This is the 19th season of the Super League era and the Huddersfield Giants 12th since promotion back to the top flight in 2003. The Huddersfield Giants came into the season as defending League Leaders' Shield winners, finishing top of the Super League the previous year – their first 1st-place finish in 81 years. Huddersfield Giants hoped to have a play-off place for the sixth consecutive season and a first Super League Grand Final appearance.

== Results ==
=== Pre-season friendlies ===
W Win D Draw L Loss

Pre-season results
Date	Versus	H/A	Venue	Result	Score	Tries	Goals	Attendance	Report
11 January	Hull Kingston Rovers	H	John Smith's Stadium	W	20–18	Cudjoe (2), McGillvary, Grix	–	1,300	Hull KR

=== League table ===
Super League XIX
Pos	Team	Pld	W	D	L	PF	PA	PD	Pts	Qualification
1	St Helens (L, C)	27	19	0	8	796	563	+233	38	Play-offs
2	Wigan Warriors	27	18	1	8	834	429	+405	37	Play-offs
3	Huddersfield Giants	27	17	3	7	785	626	+159	37	Play-offs
4	Castleford Tigers	27	17	2	8	814	583	+231	36	Play-offs
5	Warrington Wolves	27	17	1	9	793	515	+278	35	Play-offs
6	Leeds Rhinos	27	15	2	10	685	421	+264	32	Play-offs
7	Catalans Dragons	27	14	1	12	733	667	+66	29	Play-offs
8	Widnes Vikings	27	13	1	13	611	725	−114	27	Play-offs
9	Hull Kingston Rovers	27	10	3	14	627	665	−38	23	
10	Salford Red Devils	27	11	1	15	608	695	−87	23	
11	Hull F.C.	27	10	2	15	653	586	+67	22	
12	Wakefield Trinity Wildcats	27	10	1	16	557	750	−193	21	
13	Bradford Bulls (R)	27	8	0	19	512	984	−472	10 (Note: Bradford Bulls deducted 6 points on 25 February 2014 for entering administration)	Relegation to Championship
14	London Broncos (R)	27	1	0	26	438	1237	−799	2	Relegation to Championship

(C) Champions; (L) League Leaders' Shield Winners; (R) Relegated

=== Super League results ===
W Win D Draw L Loss

Super League results
Date	Round	Versus	H/A	Venue	Result	Score	Tries	Goals	Attendance	Report
2 February	1	Wigan Warriors	A	DW Stadium	W	24–8	McGillvary (3), Ferres, Grix	Brough 1/4	16,240	BBC
23 February	2	Hull Kingston Rovers	H	John Smith's Stadium	D	24–24	Brough, Robinson (2), Wood	Brough 4/4	7,180	BBC
28 February	3	Widnes Vikings	A	Halton Stadium	L	20–22	McGillvary, Cudjoe, Crabtree	Brough 4/5	5,577	SL
7 March	4	Leeds Rhinos	H	John Smith's Stadium	D	12–12	Broughton, Wardle	Brough 2/4	8,759	SL
16 March	5	Bradford Bulls	A	Odsal Stadium	W	66–18	Grix (2), Wardle (2), Lawrence, Robinson, Chan, Ta'ai (2), McGillvary (2), Ferres	Brough 9/12	6,781	SL
22 March	6	Catalans Dragons	A	Stade Gilbert Brutus	L	14–30	Grix, Ferres, Broughton	Brough 1/3	6,600	SL
30 March	7	Warrington Wolves	H	John Smith's Stadium	L	14–33	Grix, Broughton	Brough 3/3	7,068	SL
10 April	8	Hull F.C.	A	KC Stadium	L	6–30	Broughton	Brough 1/1	9,515	SL
18 April	9	Salford Red Devils	A	AJ Bell Stadium	W	42–22	Lunt, Murphy (3), Brough, McGillvary, Bailey	Brough 7/7	5,068	SL
21 April	10	Wakefield Trinity Wildcats	H	John Smith's Stadium	W	36–16	Broughton, Lawrence, Ta'ai, Cudjoe, Chan, Lunt	Brough 6/6	5,487	SL
4 May	11	Castleford Tigers	H	John Smith's Stadium	W	29–28	Wardle, Cudjoe, McGillvary, Grix, Murphy	Brough 4/5, Brough 1 DG	7,195	SL
10 May	12	London Broncos	A	The Hive	W	30–16	Lunt, Ta'ai (2), Mullally, Cudjoe	Brough 5/5	1,035	SL
18 May	13	Bradford Bulls	N	Etihad Stadium	W	54–16	Wardle, Lunt, Robinson, Broughton, Brough, Grix, Ta'ai, Mullally, Patrick	Brough 9/9		SL
23 May	14	St. Helens	A	Langtree Park	L	22–41	Patrick, Blackmore (2), Ferres	Brough 3/4	10,218	SL
29 May	15	Wigan Warriors	H	John Smith's Stadium	W	31–22	Murphy, Lunt, Wardle (2), McGillvary	Brough 5/5, Brough 1 DG	6,106	SL
12 June	16	Leeds Rhinos	A	Headingley Stadium	W	24–22				RLP
21 June	17	London Broncos	H	John Smith's Stadium	W	38–22				RLP
26 June	18	Hull Kingston Rovers	A	KC Stadium	W	26–22				RLP
5 July	19	Salford Red Devils	H	John Smith's Stadium	L	10–36				RLP
11 July	20	Castleford Tigers	A	Mend-A-Hose Jungle	L	30–44				RLP
20 July	21	Bradford Bulls	H	John Smith's Stadium	W	52–26				RLP
27 July	22	Catalans Dragons	H	John Smith's Stadium	W	38–16				RLP
3 August	23	Wakefield Trinity Wildcats	A	Rapid Solicitors Stadium	W	36–18				RLP
17 August	24	Widnes Vikings	H	John Smith's Stadium	W	28–14				RLP
28 August	25	Warrington Wolves	A	Halliwell Jones Stadium	D	24–24				RLP
7 September	26	Hull F.C.	H	John Smith's Stadium	W	38–28				RLP
12 September	27	St Helens	H	John Smith's Stadium	W	17–16				RLP

==== Play-offs ====
Play-off results
Date	Round	Versus	H/A	Venue	Result	Score	Tries	Goals	Attendance	Report
18 September	Qualifying play-offs	Wigan Warriors	A	DW Stadium	L	4-57				RLP
26 September	Preliminary semi-final	Catalans Dragons	H	John Smith's Stadium	L	16-18				RLP

=== Challenge Cup ===
W Win L Loss

Challenge Cup results
Date	Round	Versus	H/A	Venue	Result	Score	Tries	Goals	Attendance	Report
6 April	4	St. Helens	H	John Smith's Stadium	L	16–17	Lunt (2), Wardle	Brough 2/3	7,150	Report

== Players ==
=== Squad ===
* Announced on 14 November 2013:

2014 Huddersfield Giants
First team squad			Coaching staff
1 Scott Grix – FB; 2 Jermaine McGillvary – WG; 3 Leroy Cudjoe – CE, WG, FB; 4 Joe Wardle – CE; 5 Aaron Murphy – WG; 6 Danny Brough (c) – SO; 7 Luke Robinson (vc) – SH, HK; 8 Eorl Crabtree – PR; 9 Shaun Lunt – HK; 10 Craig Kopczak – PR; 11 Brett Ferres – SR, LF; 12 Jason Chan – SR; 13 Chris Bailey – LF, HK	14 Michael Lawrence – SR, CE; 15 Larne Patrick – SR, PR; 16 David Faiumu – HK, LF; 17 Ukuma Ta'ai – PR, SR; 18 Kyle Wood – SH, HK; 19 Jodie Broughton – CE; 20 Antonio Kaufusi – PR, LF; 21 Anthony Mullally – PR; 22 Jacob Fairbank – PR; 23 Josh Johnson – PR; 24 Peter Aspinall – LF; 25 Nathan Mason – HK; 26 Ben Blackmore – SH	27 Jake Connor – CE; 28 Kruise Leeming – HK, HB; 29 Jack Miller – HB	Head coach: Paul Anderson; Assistant coach: Kieron Purtill; Legend: (c) Captain(s); (vc) Vice-captain(s); Updated: 14 November 2013; Source(s): 2014 Squad Numbers

=== Transfers ===
==== Ins ====
List of players joining Huddersfield
Name	Signed from	Contract	Date
Kyle Wood	Wakefield Trinity Wildcats	3 ½ Years	July 2013
Chris Bailey	London Broncos	2 Years	September 2013
Antonio Kaufusi	London Broncos	2 Years	October 2013
Jodie Broughton	Salford Red Devils	4 Years	October 2013

==== Outs ====
List of players leaving Huddersfield
Name	Signed for	Contract	Date
Luke O'Donnell	Sydney Roosters	1 Year	February 2013
Dale Ferguson	Bradford Bulls	2 Years	July 2013
Luke George	Bradford Bulls	2 Years	July 2013
Stuart Fielden	Retired	N/A	August 2013
Matty Dawson	St. Helens	2 Years	September 2013
Jamie Cording	Featherstone Rovers	1 Year	September 2013
Jack Blagbrough	Sheffield Eagles	1 Year	November 2013
