= 2012 Huddersfield Giants season =

- Super League XVII Rank: 7th
- Play-off result: Lost in eliminators
- Challenge Cup: Semi-finals
← 2011	List of seasons	2013 →

In the 2012 rugby league season, Huddersfield Giants competed in Super League XVII and the 2012 Challenge Cup.

== Results ==
=== Pre-season friendlies ===
W Win L Loss

Pre-season results
Date	Versus	H/A	Venue	Result	Score	Tries	Goals	Attendance	Report
19 January	Wigan Warriors	A	DW Stadium	W	30–18			5,652	
22 January	Batley Bulldogs	A	Mount Pleasant	L	10–44			767	
29 January	Halifax	A	The Shay	L	6–58			1,282	

=== Super League ===
==== Table ====
Super League XVII
Pos	Team	Pld	W	D	L	PF	PA	PD	Pts	Qualification
1	Wigan Warriors (L)	27	21	0	6	994	449	+545	42	Play-offs
2	Warrington Wolves	27	20	1	6	909	539	+370	41	Play-offs
3	St Helens	27	17	2	8	795	480	+315	36	Play-offs
4	Catalans Dragons	27	18	0	9	812	611	+201	36	Play-offs
5	Leeds Rhinos (C)	27	16	0	11	823	662	+161	32	Play-offs
6	Hull F.C.	27	15	2	10	696	621	+75	32	Play-offs
7	Huddersfield Giants	27	14	0	13	699	664	+35	28	Play-offs
8	Wakefield Trinity Wildcats	27	13	0	14	633	764	−131	26	Play-offs
9	Bradford Bulls	27	14	1	12	633	756	−123	23 (Note: Bradford Bulls deducted 6 points on 25 July 2012 for entering administration)	
10	Hull Kingston Rovers	27	10	1	16	753	729	+24	21	
11	Salford City Reds	27	8	1	18	618	844	−226	17	
12	London Broncos	27	7	0	20	588	890	−302	14	
13	Castleford Tigers	27	6	0	21	554	948	−394	12	
14	Widnes Vikings	27	6	0	21	532	1082	−550	12	

Source: superleague.co.uk and BBC Sport.
Rules for classification: 1st on competition points; 2nd on match points difference.
Competition points: for win = 2; for draw = 1; for loss = 0.
(C) Champions; (L) League Leaders' Shield Winners

==== Super League results ====
W Win D Draw L Loss

Super League results
Date	Round	Versus	H/A	Venue	Result	Score	Tries	Goals	Attendance	Report
5 February	1	Wigan Warriors	A	DW Stadium	W	20–16			16,771	RLP
12 February	2	Widnes Vikings	H	Galpharm Stadium	W	66–6			8,869	RLP
18 February	2	Warrington Wolves	H	Galpharm Stadium	L	22–32			8,184	RLP
26 February	4	London Broncos	A	Twickenham Stoop	W	30–16			1,970	RLP
4 March	5	St Helens	H	Galpharm Stadium	W	17–16			9,194	RLP
11 March	6	Wakefield Trinity Wildcats	A	Rapid Solicitors Stadium	W	32–14			8,794	RLP
16 March	7	Castleford Tigers	H	Galpharm Stadium	W	42–4			6,928	RLP
25 March	8	Hull Kingston Rovers	A	Craven Park	W	22–40			7,616	RLP
30 March	9	Leeds Rhinos	A	Headingley Stadium	W	22–12			15,408	RLP
6 April	10	Salford City Reds	H	Galpharm Stadium	W	36–10			6,988	RLP
9 April	11	Hull F.C.	H	Galpharm Stadium	W	22–4			9,950	RLP
22 April	12	Bradford Bulls	A	Odsal Stadium	W	20–6			11,182	RLP
5 May	13	Catalans Dragons	A	Stade Gilbert Brutus	L	20–27			10,684	RLP
18 May	14	Wigan Warriors	H	Galpharm Stadium	L	12–32			10,123	RLP
27 May	15	Salford City Reds	N	City of Manchester Stadium	L	34–38			32,953	RLP
3 June	16	Crusaders	A	Stobart Stadium	L	22–26			4,644	RLP
21 June	17	Hull Kingston Rovers	H	Galpharm Stadium	L	26–44			4,962	RLP
24 June	18	London Broncos	H	Galpharm Stadium	W	46–10			6,019	RLP
1 July	19	Hull F.C.	A	KC Stadium	L	24–28			11,142	RLP
8 July	20	Castleford Tigers	A	Probiz Coliseum	L	6–52			5,012	RLP
22 July	21	Wakefield Trinity Wildcats	H	Galpharm Stadium	L	14–35			6,579	RLP
29 July	22	St Helens	A	Langtree Park	L	12–46			12,329	RLP
5 August	23	Catalans Dragons	H	John Smiths Stadium	W	36–18			5,822	RLP
10 August	24	Salford City Reds	A	Salford City Stadium	W	30–20			5,324	RLP
19 August	25	Bradford Bulls	H	John Smiths Stadium	L	12–34			7,477	RLP
2 September	26	Warrington Wolves	A	Halliwell Jones Stadium	L	6–54			10,550	RLP
9 September	27	Leeds Rhinos	H	John Smiths Stadium	W	48–24			9,128	RLP

==== Play-offs ====
Play-off results
Date	Round	Versus	H/A	Venue	Result	Score	Tries	Goals	Attendance	Report
11 September	Eliminators	Hull F.C.	A	KC Stadium	L	10–46			8,662	RLP

=== Challenge Cup ===
W Win L Loss

Challenge Cup results
Date	Round	Versus	H/A	Venue	Result	Score	Tries	Goals	Attendance	Report
15 April	4	Hull F.C.	A	KC Stadium	W	42–16			8,327	RLP
29 April	5	Swinton Lions	H	Galpharm Stadium	W	52–0			2,617	RLP
13 May	Quarter-finals	London Broncos	H	Galpharm Stadium	W	50–14			2,574	RLP
15 July	Semi-finals	Warrington Wolves	N	Salford City Stadium	L	6–33			9,473	RLP

== Players ==
=== Squad ===
2012 Huddersfield Giants
First team squad			Coaching staff
Scott Grix; Michael Lawrence; Leroy Cudjoe; Lee Gilmour; Jermaine McGillvary; Kevin Brown; Danny Brough; Eorl Crabtree; Luke Robinson; Keith Mason; Luke O'Donnell; David Fa'alogo; David Faiumu	Shaun Lunt; Larne Patrick; Dale Ferguson; Joe Wardle; Jason Chan; Tommy Lee; Luke George; Aaron Murphy; Tony Tonks; Jacob Fairbank; Adam Walker; Jon Molloy; Jamie Cording	Matthew Sarsfield; Matty Dawson-Jones; Greg Eden; Josh Johnson; Dave Orwell; Ross Peltier	Head coach: Nathan Brown; Legend: (c) Captain(s); (vc) Vice-captain(s); Updated: 18 January 2012; Source(s):

=== Transfers ===
==== In ====
List of players joining Huddersfield
Name	Signed from	Fee	Date
Jason Chan	Crusaders RL		
Tommy Lee	Wakefield Trinity Wildcats		
Luke George	Wakefield Trinity Wildcats		
Aaron Murphy	Wakefield Trinity Wildcats		
Tony Tonks	Featherstone Rovers		
Greg Eden	Castleford Tigers		

==== Out ====
List of players leaving Huddersfield
Name	Signed for	Fee	Date
David Hodgson	Hull Kingston Rovers		
Darrell Griffin	Leeds Rhinos		
Andy Raleigh	Wakefield Trinity Wildcats		
Danny Kirmond	Wakefield Trinity Wildcats		
Graeme Horne	Hull Kingston Rovers		
Keale Carlile	Hull Kingston Rovers		
Kyle Wood	Wakefield Trinity Wildcats		
Josh Griffin	Castleford Tigers		
Greg McNally	Leigh Centurions		
