= 2011 Huddersfield Giants season =

British rugby football season

- Super League XVI Rank: 4th
- Play-off result: Preliminary Semi-final
- Challenge Cup: Quarter-finals
- 2011 record: Wins: 18; draws: 0; losses: 12
- Points scored: For: 707; against: 524

Team information
- Chairman: Ken Davy
- Head coach: Nathan Brown
- Captain: Kevin Brown
- Stadium: Galpharm Stadium
- Avg. attendance: 7,147
- High attendance: 10,428

Top scorers
- Tries: Jermaine McGillvary – 18
- Goals: Danny Brough – 88
- Points: Danny Brough – 213
← 2010	2012 →

The 2011 Huddersfield Giants season was their 148th in the Rugby Football League, and its 13th in Super League. This season saw the Fartowners finish in fourth place and lose both of their playoff matches, which The Guardian and Love Rugby League described as disappointing given their strong start to the season. The Claret and Gold were at top spot three times in the year, before a mid-season slump caused them to drop down the table, and finish fourth; the significant achievement was finishing above every other Yorkshire team.

== Season review ==
Preseason

The Giants Started preseason with a 30–18 loss to Batley Bulldogs, then they came back to the Galpharm for Eorl Crabtree's testimonial match against Hull Kingston Rovers, an experimental side beat the Robins 18–12. They then faced their toughest test, against St. Helens, winning against a relatively full-strength team.

February 2011

The First Match of the campaign was against title rivals Warrington Wolves whose signings included Joel Monaghan, and Giants Man of Steel and Captain, Brett Hodgson. The Match was a fitting opening for the Wolves, who were knocked out of the running for a historic double, by a length of the field effort from Leroy Cudjoe in the Play-offs. Huddersfield came out victors by 28–18. Then they travelled to Castleford, who were top of the table, in what was dubbed somewhat prematurely a 'Top of the Table' clash, a wet weather game slowed the Fartowners, who left Wheldon Road losers 12–18. In the first home game of the year, they faced Hull F.C. in front of the Huddersfield Crowd – after an early shock, they ran out 20–10 winners.

March 2011

The Giants started March with a hard trip down to in-form Harlequins who were in the midst of their best start in their history. After another scrappy affair, the Giants finished the game 18–10 winners. They returned to Yorkshire to face rivals Bradford Bulls at the Galpharm Stadium. In a rout, the Bulls were beaten 50–16, with tries from Jermaine McGillvary, Leroy Cudjoe, David Fa'alogo, Scott Grix, new signing Dale Ferguson, Graeme Horne and Larne Patrick and 7 goals from Danny Brough. In their biggest game yet, they faced an injury effected Wigan, however after an impressive performance from Josh Charnley and Sean O'Loughlin, they lost 20–6. After this defeat, they travelled to Craven Park to face Hull Kingston Rovers. After floodlight troubles threatened to harm the match, the visitors played some great Rugby, and won 38–16.

April 2011

The Claret and Gold started April hosting Wakefield Trinity, a spirited performance by Wakefield against a much changed Fartown team saw Wakefield scare them, only leading 6–4 at Half-Time. By the end of the match, they led 34–10. Then they hosted the Warrington Wolves again at the Galpharm, which after a superb performance, they ran out 29–10 winners. They then went to Headingley, searching for their first ever win there in the Super League era. Over 3,000 fans turned out to see a historic victory, a heated affair, with 2 sending offs, a fight, and six Huddersfield tries, the game finished 38–6, and marked a new era in Huddersfield Giants history. During the Easter Period, they started on a Tuesday night at home to Salford City Reds, where despite the visiting side showing some clever and pretty rugby, they ended the game with a 52–22, picking up the 2 points. They then travelled to the South of France to face an excellent Catalans Dragons side. After a Scott Dureau drop goal, the Giants unluckily lost 13–12.

May 2011

The Giants played just two Super League games during May. Returning for a Saturday Night 'Clash of the Titans' with St. Helens, the Giants won 40–18 against the Injury ravaged Saints side. After which they returned to the KC Stadium, they played Hull F.C. on the same day as the 2011 League One Play-off Final, winning 34–20, with tries from Michael Lawrence, Danny Brough, Lee Gilmour and a hat trick from veteran winger David Hodgson.

June 2011

Huddersfield started June at The Shay, where the team would play until urgent pitch work would be completed at their home ground, The Galpharm Stadium, with a game versus the Castleford Tigers. The Tigers and the Giants both wore their predominantly white kit. The mix up was sorted when the Tigers wore a Halifax old shirt. The Giants ran in eight tries in a 40–18 rout in front of a crowd of over 5,000. They then travelled to Wakefield Trinity, where the home team upset the Top-4 Giants in a 13–10 win. At their second 'On the Road' game in Halifax, they beat Catalans 28–20 on Sky Television, the highlight of the match being a Damien Blanch try for the visitors. The Giants ended the month at Wigan in a match labelled 'The Big One' with a huge ticketing push from both teams attracted a 19,169 crowd to the DW Stadium, the Giants were outplayed, and Wigan won easily 46–12, with Hodgson and Kirmond getting the only tries.

July 2011

The Start of July was the end of the Giants time at The Shay, where the played Crusaders, in front of their smallest crowd of the year, 4,892. With 12 points to the Debuting Gregg McNally, the Giants beat the Bottom of the Table Crusaders 40–12. They then went to the Halliwell Jones Stadium to visit Warrington Wolves, who wanted revenge after losing the last 3 against the Giants, after being behind 22–0 at half time, found hard, but fell short. After this they faced what must be the most disappointing result of the year, a 36–0 humiliation by the Bradford Bulls. The Giants returned to the Galpharm Stadium with a homecoming victory, in the last game of July, they beat Hull Kingston Rovers and made 4th spot a little safer again.

August 2011

Pulling towards the 'Business End' of the Season, the Giants faced St. Helens in [Widnes]'s Halton Stadium, Saints temporary home. They outplayed the Giants, who never looked like threatening. In a close fought match, the Giants still lost out 19–6, Foster kicking 3. They then travelled to the Willows, expecting a victory, but in a disappointing turn of events, lost out 24–18. Huddersfield had won just 4 in 10.

September 2011

In the last two games pulling towards the play-offs, the Giants hosted two very different sides, Harlequins had looked good early on, but since the last time the two sides met, they had slumped, and would have been bottom, if not for points deductions to Wakefield Trinity and Crusaders. The Giants however pulled out all the stops, and hammered the enthusiastic, but ultimately unsuccessful Quins side. They then hosted Leeds Rhinos, in a match dubbed 'the Battle of Yorkshire', although Huddersfield had already secured 4th spot, ahead of the Loiners. In a tight affair, Leeds beat the confident Giants side, looking to do a double, by 7 points, 24–31.

Play-offs

In the first week of the play-offs, without Leroy Cudjoe, Shaun Lunt and Joe Wardle, the Giants were hammered by an excellent Warrington Wolves side, although the refereeing of Steve Ganson was called into question, with Nathan Brown, Huddersfield's coach, saying '[Ganson] obviously got the game wrong the other day'. The Giants then hosted the Leeds Rhinos.

== Results ==
=== Pre-season ===
W Win L Loss

Pre-season results
Date	Versus	H/A	Venue	Result	Score	Report
	Batley Bulldogs	A	Mount Pleasant	L	18–30	
	Hull Kingston Rovers	H	Galpharm Stadium	W	18–12	
	St. Helens	A	Halton Stadium	W		

=== Super League ===
==== Table ====
Pos	Team	Pld	W	D	L	PF	PA	PD	Pts	Qualification
1	Warrington Wolves (L)	27	22	0	5	1072	401	+671	44	Play-offs
2	Wigan Warriors	27	20	3	4	852	432	+420	43	Play-offs
3	St Helens	27	17	3	7	782	515	+267	37	Play-offs
4	Huddersfield Giants	27	16	0	11	707	524	+183	32	Play-offs
5	Leeds Rhinos (C)	27	15	1	11	757	603	+154	31	Play-offs
6	Catalans Dragons	27	15	1	11	689	626	+63	31	Play-offs
7	Hull Kingston Rovers	27	14	0	13	713	692	+21	28	Play-offs
8	Hull F.C.	27	13	1	13	718	569	+149	27	Play-offs
9	Castleford Tigers	27	12	2	13	664	808	−144	26	
10	Bradford Bulls	27	9	2	16	570	826	−256	20	
11	Salford City Reds	27	10	0	17	542	809	−267	20	
12	Harlequins	27	6	1	20	524	951	−427	13	
13	Wakefield Trinity Wildcats	27	7	0	20	453	957	−504	10 (Note: Wakefield deducted 4 points for entering administration.)	
14	Crusaders	27	6	0	21	527	857	−330	8 (Note: Crusaders deducted 4 points for entering administration.)	

Source: rugbyleagueproject.org
Rules for classification: 1) Points; 2) Points difference; 3) Number of points scored;
(C) Champions; (L) League Leaders' Shield winners

==== Super League results ====
W Win D Draw L Loss

Super League results
Date	Round	Versus	H/A	Venue	Result	Score	Attendance	Report
12 February	1	Warrington Wolves	N	Millennium Stadium	W	28–18	30,891	RLP
19 February	2	Castleford Tigers	A	Probiz Colosseum	L	12–18	5,992	RLP
27 February	3	Hull F.C.	H	Galpharm Stadium	W	20–10	8,822	RLP
4 March	4	Harlequins	A	The Stoop	W	18–10	2,624	RLP
13 March	5	Bradford Bulls	H	Galpharm Stadium	W	50–16	9,466	RLP
18 March	6	Wigan Warriors	H	Galpharm Stadium	L	6–20	8,151	RLP
26 March	7	Hull Kingston Rovers	A	Craven Park	W	38–16	7,502	RLP
3 April	8	Wakefield Trinity	H	Galpharm Stadium	W	34–10	7,267	RLP
8 April	9	Warrington Wolves	H	Galpharm Stadium	W	29–10	7,224	RLP
15 April	10	Leeds Rhinos	H	Headingley	W	38–6	14,768	RLP
22 April	11	Crusaders	A	Racecourse Ground	L	6–32	3,008	RLP
26 April	12	Salford City Reds	H	Galpharm Stadium	W	52–22	6,042	RLP
30 April	13	Catalans Dragons	A	Stade Gilbert Brutus	L	12–13	7,825	RLP
14 May	14	St. Helens	H	Galpharm Stadium	W	40–18	7,843	RLP
29 May	15	Hull F.C.	A	KC Stadium	W	34–20	11,274	RLP
5 June	16	Castleford Tigers	H*	The Shay	W	40–18	5,237	RLP
12 June	17	Wakefield Trinity	A	Belle Vue	L	18–40	5,436	RLP
18 June	18	Catalans Dragons	H	Galpharm Stadium	W	28–20	5,132	RLP
25 June	19	Wigan Warriors	A	DW Stadium	L	12–46	19,169	RLP
3 July	20	Crusaders	H	Galpharm Stadium	W	40–12	4,892	RLP
8 July	21	Warrington Wolves	A	Halliwell Jones Stadium	L	16–28	10,283	RLP
17 July	22	Bradford Bulls	A	Odsal Stadium	L	0–36	14,047	RLP
30 July	23	Hull Kingston Rovers	H	Galpharm Stadium	W	46–26	4,892	RLP
12 August	24	St. Helens	A	Halton Stadium	L	6–19	6,421	RLP
19 August	25	Salford City Reds	A	The Willows	L	18–24	3,458	RLP
4 September	26	Harlequins	H	Galpharm Stadium	W	50–12	5,220	RLP
11 September	27	Leeds Rhinos	H	Galpharm Stadium	L	24–31	10,428	RLP

- Home game played at The Shay in Halifax

==== Play-offs ====
W Win L Loss

Play-off results
Date	Round	Versus	H/A	Venue	Result	Score	Attendance	Report
16 September	Qualifying play-off	Warrington Wolves	A	Halliwell Jones Stadium	L	0–47	10,006	RLP
23 September	Preliminary Semi-final	Leeds Rhinos	H	Galpharm Stadium	L	28–34	7,872	RLP

=== Challenge Cup ===
W Win L Loss

Challenge Cup results
Date	Round	Versus	H/A	Venue	Result	Score	Attendance	Report
8 May	4	Batley Bulldogs	A	Love Rugby League Stadium	W	28–18	2,676	RLP
22 May	5	Catalans Dragons	H	Galpharm Stadium	W	30–16	3,098	RLP
24 July	Quarter-finals	Castleford Tigers	A	Probiz Colosseum	L	18–22	6,336	RLP

== Players ==
=== Squad ===
No.	Player	Apps	Tries	Goals	DGs	Points
1	Scott Grix	30	11	18	0	80
2	Michael Lawrence	27	9	0	0	36
3	Leroy Cudjoe	30	9	5	0	46
4	Lee Gilmour	28	5	0	0	20
5	David Hodgson	21	15	0	0	60
6	Kevin Brown	28	9	0	0	36
7	Danny Brough	26	9	88	1	213
8	Eorl Crabtree	30	4	0	0	16
9	Luke Robinson	25	6	0	0	24
10	Darrell Griffin	27	4	0	0	16
11	Luke O'Donnell	16	2	0	0	8
12	David Fa'alogo	19	8	0	0	32
13	David Faiumu	27	2	0	0	8
14	Shaun Lunt	18	7	0	0	28
15	Keith Mason	19	0	0	0	0
16	Andy Raleigh	12	0	0	0	0
17	Danny Kirmond	18	2	0	0	8
18	Larne Patrick	28	3	0	0	12
19	Graeme Horne	20	8	0	0	32
20	Jermaine McGillvary	30	18	0	0	72
22	Keal Carlile	2	1	0	0	4
23	Kyle Wood	8	0	0	0	0
24	Adam Walker	1	0	0	0	0
26	Jamie Cording	5	1	0	0	4
27	Jacob Fairbank	2	0	0	0	0
28	Gregg McNally	1	0	6	0	12
29	Joe Wardle	15	5	0	0	20
32	Jon Molloy	3	0	0	0	0
36	Jamie Simpson	9	0	0	0	0
37	Dale Ferguson	19	6	0	0	24

=== Transfers ===
In

Player	From	Details	Date	Ref
Matthew Sarsfield	Wigan Warriors	3-year contract	January 2011	
Jamie Simpson	South Sydney Rabbitohs	3-year contract	January 2011	
Dale Ferguson	Wakefield Trinity Wildcats	3-year contract	February 2011	
Greg Eden	Castleford Tigers	2-year contract	September 2011	
Luke George	Wakefield Trinity Wildcats	2-year contract	September 2011	
Tony Tonks	Featherstone Rovers	12-month loan	October 2011	
Aaron Murphy	Wakefield Trinity Wildcats	2-year contract	October 2011	
Tommy Lee	Wakefield Trinity Wildcats	1-year contract	October 2011	

Out

Player	To	Details	Date	Ref
David Hodgson	Hull Kingston Rovers		July 2011	
Keal Carlile	Released		September 2011	
Gregg McNally	Released		September 2011	
Andy Raleigh	Wakefield Trinity Wildcats		October 2011	
Danny Kirmond	Wakefield Trinity Wildcats		October 2011	
