= 2016 Huddersfield Giants season =

- Super League XXI Rank: 12th
- Play-off result: N/A
- Challenge Cup: Quarter-finals
- 2016 record: Wins: 7; draws: 0; losses: 18
- Points scored: For: 481; against: 535

Team information
- Chairman: Ken Davy
- Head Coach: Paul Anderson
- Captain: Danny Brough
- Stadium: John Smith's Stadium

Top scorers
- Tries: Jermaine McGillvary - 7
- Goals: Danny Brough - 17
- Points: Danny Brough - 38
← 2015	List of seasons	2017 →

This article details the Huddersfield Giants rugby league football club's 2016 season. This was the 21st season of the Super League era and the Huddersfield Giants 14th since promotion back to the top flight in 2003.

== Results ==
=== Super League ===
==== table ====
Pos	Team	Pld	W	D	L	PF	PA	PD	Pts	Qualification
1	Hull F.C.	23	17	0	6	605	465	+140	34	Super League Super 8s
2	Warrington Wolves	23	16	1	6	675	425	+250	33	Super League Super 8s
3	Wigan Warriors	23	16	0	7	455	440	+15	32	Super League Super 8s
4	St Helens	23	14	0	9	573	536	+37	28	Super League Super 8s
5	Catalans Dragons	23	13	0	10	593	505	+88	26	Super League Super 8s
6	Castleford Tigers	23	10	1	12	617	640	−23	21	Super League Super 8s
7	Widnes Vikings	23	10	0	13	499	474	+25	20	Super League Super 8s
8	Wakefield Trinity Wildcats	23	10	0	13	485	654	−169	20	Super League Super 8s
9	Leeds Rhinos	23	8	0	15	404	576	−172	16	The Qualifiers
10	Salford Red Devils	23	10	0	13	560	569	−9	14 (Note: Salford deducted 6 points for salary cap breaches in 2014 and 2015.)	The Qualifiers
11	Hull Kingston Rovers	23	6	2	15	486	610	−124	14	The Qualifiers
12	Huddersfield Giants	23	6	0	17	511	569	−58	12	The Qualifiers

Source: Rugby League Project
Rules for classification: 1) Points; 2) Points difference; 3) Number of points scored;

==== Super league results ====
W Win D Draw L Loss

Super League results
Date	Round	Versus	H/A	Venue	Result	Score	Tries	Goals	Attendance	Report
5 February	1	St. Helens	A	Langtree Park	L	16-30	Murphy, Ta'ai, Connor	Brough (1/1), Ellis (1/2)	10,408	
12 February	2	Wigan Warriors	H	John Smith's Stadium	L	13-18	McGillvary, Foster	Ellis (2/3), Ellis (DG)	5,912	
28 February	3	Widnes Vikings	H	John Smith's Stadium	L	18-36	Lawrence, McGillvary, Foster	Foster (3/3)	5,183	
4 March	4	Leeds Rhinos	A	Headingley Stadium	L	16-20	Brough, McGillvary, Lawrence	Foster (2/3)	14,962	
13 March	5	Hull Kingston Rovers	H	John Smith's Stadium	W	38-6	Tansey, Lawrence, Murphy, McGillvary, Patrick, Ta'ai	Brough (7/7)	5,610	
20 March	6	Catalans Dragons	H	John Smith's Stadium	L	26-46	Connor, McGillvary, Patrick, Cudjoe, Leeming	Brough (2/4), Tansey (1/1)	4,607	
25 March	7	Wakefield Trinity Wildcats	A	Bell Vue	L	22-36	McGillvary, Connor (2), Murphy	Brough (3/4)	4,989	
28 March	8	Salford Red Devils	H	John Smith's Stadium	L	24-26	Ta'ai (2), Connor, McGillvary	Brough (4/4)	4,885	
3 April	9	Castleford Tigers	A	The Jungle	L	34-38	Cudjoe (2), McGillvary (3), Rapira	Brough (5)		
8 April	10	Hull F.C.	A	KCOM Stadium	L	20-37	Wardle, Murphy, Brough, McGillvary	Brough (2)	10,557	
15 April	11	Warrington Wolves	H	John Smith's Stadium	W	11–0	Murphy, Cudjoe	Brough (1 + DG)		
21 April	12	Wigan Warriors	A	DW Stadium	L	19-26	Brierley (3)	Brough (3 + DG)		
29 April	13	Leeds Rhinos	H	John Smith's Stadium	W	28–20	Ta'ai, Ormsby, McGillvary, Connor, Crabtree	Brough (4)		
14/5/16	14	Catalans Dragons	A	Stade Gilbert Brutus	L	14-16	Mason, Connor	Brough (3)		
22 May	15	St. Helens	N (Note: Magic Weekend)	St James' Park	W	48-20	McGillvary (2), Ta'ai, Ellis, Murphy, Hinchcliffe, Wood	Brough (8)		
29 May	16	Widnes Vikings	A	Select Security Stadium	L	20-24	Mason, Brough, Wardle, McGillvary	Brough (2)	4,683	
3 June	17	Castleford Tigers	H	John Smith's Stadium	L	22-30	Ellis, Cudjoe, Brierley, Conner	Ellis (3)	5,741	
12 June	18	Wakefield Trinity Wildcats	H	John Smith's Stadium	L	2-10		Brough		
17 June	19	Salford Red Devils	A	AJ Bell Stadium	W	31-30	Conner, Ta'ai, Cudjoe, Crabtree, Wardle	Brough (5/5 + DG)		
30 June	20	Hull F.C.	H	John Smith's Stadium	W	22-12	McGillvary (2), Lawrence, Symonds	Ellis (3)	4,143	
8 July	21	Hull Kingston Rovers	A	Lightstream Stadium	L	19-20	Brierley, Connor, Ellis	Ellis (3), Brough (DG)	6,434	
17 July	22	St. Helens	H	John Smith's Stadium	L	18-34	Brough, McGillvary, Symonds	Brough (3)	5,526	
23 July	23	Warrington Wolves	A	Halliwell Jones Stadium	L	30-34	Ormsby (3), Huby, Mason, Murphy	Brough (3)	9,829	

=== Qualifiers ===
==== Qualifiers table ====
Pos	Team	Pld	W	D	L	PF	PA	PD	Pts	Qualification
1	Leeds Rhinos	7	6	0	1	239	94	+145	12	2017 Super League
2	Leigh Centurions (P)	7	6	0	1	223	193	+30	12	2017 Super League
3	Huddersfield Giants	7	5	0	2	257	166	+91	10	2017 Super League
4	Hull Kingston Rovers (R)	7	4	0	3	235	142	+93	8	Million Pound Game
5	Salford Red Devils	7	3	0	4	208	152	+56	6	Million Pound Game
6	London Broncos	7	3	0	4	221	212	+9	6	2017 Championship
7	Batley Bulldogs	7	1	0	6	111	318	−207	2	2017 Championship
8	Featherstone Rovers	7	0	0	7	96	313	−217	0	2017 Championship

Source: Rugby League Project
Rules for classification: 1) Points; 2) Points difference; 3) Number of points scored;
(P) Promoted; (R) Relegated

==== Qualifiers results ====
Qualifiers results
Date	Round	Versus	H/A	Venue	Result	Score	Tries	Goals	Attendance	Report
7 August	1	Salford Red Devils	A	AJ Bell Stadium	L	12-34	Mason, Roberts	Brough (2/2)	2,184	
14 August	2	Featherstone Rovers	H	John Smith's Stadium	W	62-16	Brierley (2), Roberts (2), Ta'ai (2), Wood (2), Hinchcliffe, Lawrence, Ormsby	Ellis (9/11)	3,690	
21 August	3	Batley Bulldogs	A	Fox's Biscuits Stadium	W	58-28	Brierley (3), Cudjoe (2), Symonds (2), Conner, Crabtree, Ormsby, Wardle	Ellis (7/11)	2,201	
2 September	4	London Broncos	H	John Smith's Stadium	W	40-4	Cudjoe (2), Brough, Lawrence, McGillvary, Murphy, Wardle	Brough (6/7)	3,794	
10 September	5	Leigh Centurions	A	Leigh Sports Village	L	40-48	Cudjoe (2), Ellis (2), Conner, Lawrence, Murphy	Brough (6/7)	5,934	
18 September	6	Leeds Rhinos	H	John Smith's Stadium	W	22-14	Brierley, Brough, Cudjoe	Brough (5/6)	6,666	
24 September	7	Hull Kingston Rovers	A	Lightstream Stadium	W	23-22	Brierley (2), Cudjoe, Murphy	Brough (3/5 + DG)	8,024	

=== Challenge Cup ===
Challenge Cup results
Date	Round	Versus	H/A	Venue	Result	Score	Tries	Goals	Attendance	Report
6 May	R6	Leeds Rhinos	H	John Smith's Stadium	W	36–22	Ta'ai, McGillvary, Brierley, Wood, Brough	Brough (6 + 3DG), Conner (DG)	4,979	
23 June	QF	Wakefield Trinity Wildcats	H	John Smith's Stadium	L	16–28	Grix, Connor, McGillvary (2)		3,289	

== Players ==
No	Player	Position
1	Scott Grix	Fullback
2	Jermaine McGillvary	Wing
3	Leroy Cudjoe	Centre
4	Joe Wardle	Centre
5	Aaron Murphy	Wing
6	Danny Brough	Stand-off
7	Jamie Ellis	Scrum-half
8	Eorl Crabtree	Prop
9	Ryan Hinchcliffe	Hooker
10	Craig Huby	Prop
11	Tom Symonds	Second-row
13	Larne Patrick	Loose forward
14	Michael Lawrence	Second-row
15	Kyle Wood	Hooker
16	Sam Rapira	Prop
17	Ukuma Ta'ai	Prop
18	Jake Connor	Centre
21	Nathan Mason	Prop
22	Oliver Roberts	Second-row
23	Josh Johnson	Prop
23	Gene Ormsby	Wing
24	Kruise Leeming	Hooker
24	Jared Simpson	Fullback
25	Tyler Dickinson	Prop
27	Mikey Wood	Prop
29	Jamie Foster	Wing
31	Sam Wood	Centre
32	Jordan Tansey	Fullback
32	Daniel Smith	Prop
34	Ryan Brierley	Scrum-half
36	Sebastine Ikahihifo	Lock

== 2016 transfers in/out ==
In

Nat	Name	Moved From	Contract Length	Date
(Australia)	Ryan Hinchcliffe	Melbourne Storm	3 Years	June 2015
(New Zealand)	Sam Rapira	New Zealand Warriors	2 Years	May 2015
(England)	Daniel Smith	Wakefield Trinity Wildcats	4 ½ Years	July 2015
(Wales)	Larne Patrick	Wigan Warriors	Loan Return	September 2015
(England)	Ryan Brierley	Leigh Centurions	4 ½ Years	March 2016

Out

Nat	Name	Moved To	Contract Length	Date
(Ireland)	Anthony Mullally	Leeds Rhinos	3 Years	May 2015
(England)	Jack Hughes	Warrington Wolves	2 Years	August 2015
(England)	Jodie Broughton	Catalans Dragons	2 Years	August 2015
(England)	Shaun Lunt	Hull Kingston Rovers	4 Years	August 2015
(Australia)	Chris Bailey	Retirement	N/A	September 2015
(Wales)	Craig Kopczak	Salford Red Devils	1 Year	October 2015
(England)	Mick Learmonth	York City Knights	1 Year	October 2015
(England)	Jacob Fairbank	Halifax	2 Years	November 2015
(England)	Brett Ferres	Leeds Rhinos	1 Year	January 2016
