= David Faiumu =

NZ & Samoa international rugby league footballer

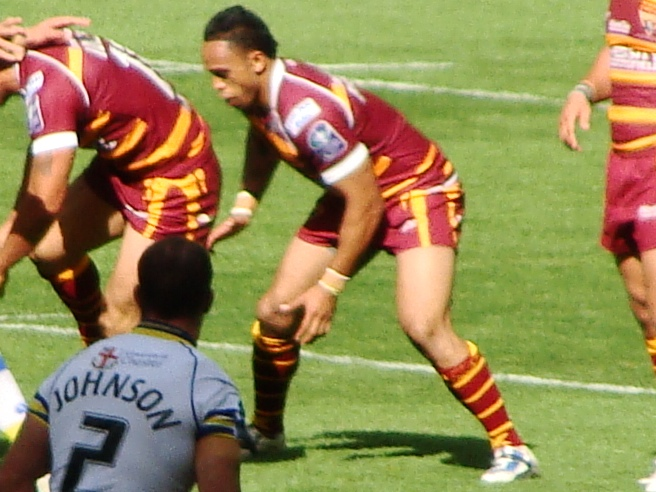

Personal information
- Full name: David Maniapoto Faiumu
- Born: 30 April 1983 (age 43) Wellington, New Zealand

Playing information
- Height: 180 cm (5 ft 11 in)
- Weight: 100 kg (15 st 10 lb)
- Position: Hooker, Lock
Club
Years	Team	Pld	T	G	FG	P
2004–08	North Qld Cowboys	76	8	0	0	32
2008–14	Huddersfield Giants	162	14	0	0	56
	Total	238	22	0	0	88
Representative
Years	Team	Pld	T	G	FG	P
2005–07	New Zealand	10	1	0	0	4
2010	Samoa	1	0	0	0	0
2011–12	Exiles	2	0	0	0	0

David Faiumu (born 30 April 1983) is a former professional rugby league footballer who played in the 2000s and 2010s. He is currently an assistant coach for the North Queensland Cowboys Women in the NRL Women's Premiership (NRLW) and the New Zealand women's national rugby league team.

A New Zealand and Samoan international representative, he played for the North Queensland Cowboys in the National Rugby League (NRL) and Huddersfield Giants in the Super League.

== Background ==
Born in Wellington, New Zealand, Faiumu is of Samoan descent and played his junior rugby league for the Randwick Kingfishers and Wainuiomata Lions.

== Playing career ==
In 2000, Faiumu played for Wainuiomata as a 17-year-old in the inaugural season of the Bartercard Cup before being signed by the Canberra Raiders.

He spent two seasons playing for the Raiders' Jersey Flegg Cup side and represented the Junior Kiwis in 2001.

In 2003, Faiumu left Canberra, joining the Central Comets in the Queensland Cup. After one season at the club, he was signed by the North Queensland Cowboys.

=== North Queensland Cowboys ===
In Round 11 of the 2004 NRL season, Faiumu made his NRL debut, coming off the bench in a 22–18 loss to the Penrith Panthers.

In 2005, he became a regular in the Cowboys' 17, playing 21 games, which included coming off the bench in the club's first ever Grand Final, which they lost to the Wests Tigers. In October 2005, he was selected to play for the New Zealand in the Tri-Nations, coming off the bench in their 24–0 final victory over Australia.

=== Huddersfield Giants ===
On 7 June 2008, after four-and-a-half seasons with the Cowboys, Faiumu was granted an early release from his contract to join the Huddersfield Giants.

In 2009, he started at lock in the Challenge Cup final, which Huddersfield lost 25–16 to the Warrington Wolves. On 16 October 2010, Faiumu represented Samoa in their 50–6 loss to New Zealand.

In 2011 and 2012, Faiumu represented the Exiles against England.

At the end of the 2014 season, following seven years at the club, Faiumu announced his retirement and took up a position as the Giants' Developmental Officer.

== Coaching career ==
In October 2017, Faiumu returned to Rockhampton, Queensland, taking up a role as assistant coach for the Central Queensland Capras.

In 2019, Faiumu replaced Kim Williams as head coach of the Capras, a position he held until January 2021.

In 2022, he became assistant coach of the Kiwi Ferns under head coach Ricky Henry.

On 18 April 2024, Faiumu returned to the Cowboys as an assistant coach to their women's side.

=== Club statistics ===
Year	Team	Matches	Tries	Goals	Field Goals	Points
2004	North Queensland Cowboys	13	1	0	0	4
2005	North Queensland Cowboys	21	5	0	0	20
2006	North Queensland Cowboys	18	2	0	0	8
2007	North Queensland Cowboys	20	0	0	0	0
2008	North Queensland Cowboys	3	0	0	0	0
2009	Huddersfield Giants	30	3	0	0	12
2010	Huddersfield Giants	32	4	0	0	16
2011	Huddersfield Giants	27	2	0	0	8
2012	Huddersfield Giants	25	2	0	0	8
2013	Huddersfield Giants	28	2	0	0	8
2014	Huddersfield Giants	20	1	0	0	4

=== Representative statistics ===
Year	Team	Matches	Tries	Goals	Field Goals	Points
2005	New Zealand	5	1	0	0	4
2006	New Zealand	1	0	0	0	0
2007	New Zealand	1	0	0	0	0
2007	New Zealand	3	0	0	0	0
2010	Samoa	1	0	0	0	0
2011	Exiles	1	0	0	0	0
2012	Exiles	1	0	0	0	0
