= Keal Carlile =

English professional rugby league footballer

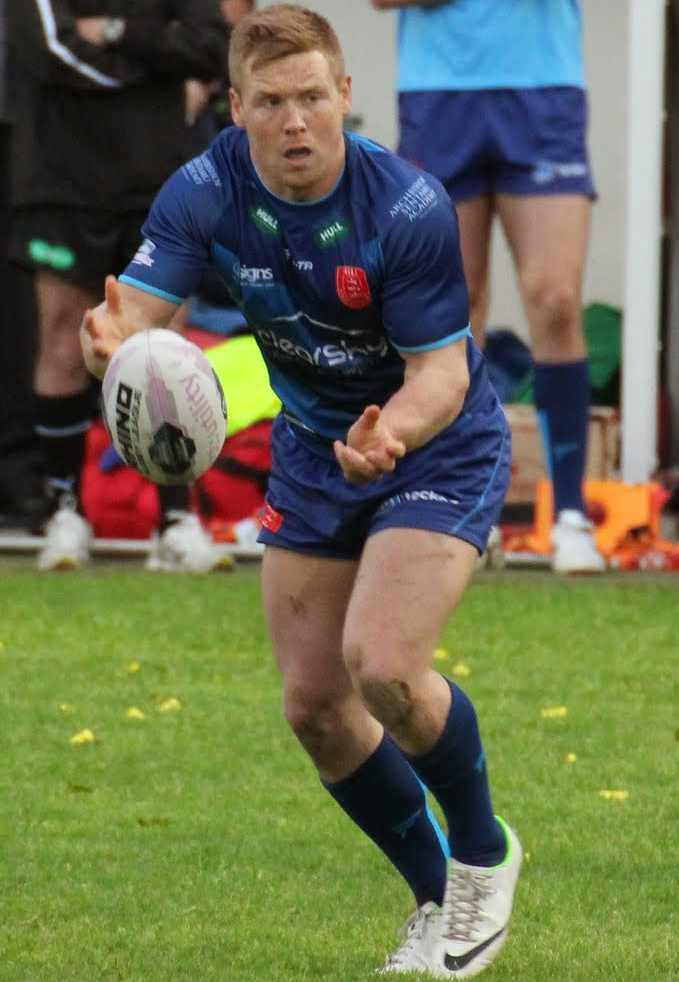

Personal information
- Born: 20 March 1990 (age 36) Pontefract, West Yorkshire, England

Playing information
- Height: 5 ft 9 in (1.75 m)
- Weight: 14 st 0 lb (89 kg)
- Position: Hooker
Club
Years	Team	Pld	T	G	FG	P
2008	Bradford Bulls	1	0	0	0	0
2009–11	Huddersfield Giants	4	2	0	0	8
2010(loan)	→ Barrow Raiders	6	2	0	0	8
2012–15	Hull Kingston Rovers	36	1	0	0	4
2014(loan)	→ Gateshead Thunder	3	2	0	0	8
2015–16	Sheffield Eagles	57	3	0	0	12
2017–18	Featherstone Rovers	62	6	0	0	24
2019	Newcastle Thunder	23	9	0	0	32
2020	Halifax	3	0	0	0	0
	Total	195	25	0	0	96

Keal Carlile (born 20 March 1990) is an English former professional rugby league footballer.

== Career ==
Keal made his début for the Bradford Bulls against St. Helens on 13 June 2008, but made only one further appearance for the Bradford Bulls before he signed for the Huddersfield Giants in October 2008.

In 2010, Carlile joined the Barrow Raiders on loan.

In the opening game of the 2011 season, Carlile scored his first Super League try in a 28–18 victory over Warrington Wolves. In the following game, against the Castleford Tigers, Carlile was forced to leave the field due to extreme fatigue. He later underwent surgery after being diagnosed with a heart valve problem. He was released by Huddersfield at the end of the season, and signed for Hull Kingston Rovers on a two-year deal.

He spent a further one and a half years at Hull Kingston Rovers, making a total 35 appearances for the club and three on dual registration with the Gateshead Thunder. He scored two tries in 2014 before being granted a release to seek further first team opportunities in 2015.

In March 2015, Carlile joined Sheffield Eagles on an 18-month contract going on to make 25 appearances that season.

He retired in February 2020.
