= Jack Blagbrough =

English rugby league footballer

Personal information
- Born: 18 January 1994 (age 32)
- Height: 6 ft 1 in (1.85 m)
- Weight: 16 st 10 lb (106 kg)

Playing information
- Position: Prop
Club
| Years | Team | Pld | T | G | FG | P |
|---|---|---|---|---|---|---|
| 2013 | Huddersfield Giants | 1 | 0 | 0 | 0 | 0 |
| 2014–16 | Sheffield Eagles | 20 | 3 | 1 | 0 | 14 |
| 2015(loan) | → York City Knights | 12 | 2 | 0 | 0 | 8 |
| 2016(loan) | → Oldham RLFC | 7 | 2 | 0 | 0 | 8 |
| 2017 | Mackay Cutters | 15 | 0 | 0 | 0 | 0 |
| 2018 | Leigh Centurions | 13 | 0 | 0 | 0 | 0 |
| 2018(loan) | → Hunslet RLFC | 5 | 2 | 0 | 0 | 8 |
| 2018(Dual Registration) | → Workington Town | 8 | 3 | 0 | 0 | 12 |
| 2019 | York City Knights | 24 | 1 | 0 | 0 | 4 |
| 2020–22 | Batley Bulldogs | 42 | 2 | 0 | 0 | 8 |
| 2022(loan) | → Dewsbury Rams | 7 | 0 | 0 | 0 | 0 |
| 2023 | Oldham RLFC | 7 | 1 | 0 | 0 | 4 |
| | Total | 161 | 16 | 1 | 0 | 66 |
- Source: As of 1 May 2025

Jack Blagbrough (born 18 January 1994) is a professional rugby league footballer who last played as a prop for Oldham RLFC in the RFL League 1.

He has previously played for the Huddersfield Giants in the Super League. Blagbbrough has played for the Sheffield Eagles in the Championship, and on loan from Sheffield at the York City Knights in Championship 1 and Oldham in the Championship. He has also played for the Leigh Centurions and York in the second tier.

== Background ==
Jack Blagbrough was in the Huddersfield Giants Academy system and played his junior rugby league with the Newsome Panthers. Blagbrough also studied Maths and Biology at the University of Leeds.

== Career ==
He made his Super League début for the Huddersfield Giants in 2013.

He has previously played for the Sheffield Eagles and on loan at the York City Knights and the Oldham R.L.F.C.

In October 2017 he joined the Leigh Centurions in the Championship on a three-year deal.

In November 2018 he joined the York City Knights.
