= Peter Aspinall =

English rugby league footballer

Personal information
- Full name: Peter Aspinall
- Born: 4 April 1994 (age 31) England
- Height: 188 cm (6 ft 2 in)
- Weight: 97 kg (15 st 4 lb)

Playing information
- Position: Loose forward
Club
Years	Team	Pld	T	G	FG	P
2013	Huddersfield Giants	3	1	0	0	4
2014	Sheffield Eagles	11	1	0	0	4
2015	York City Knights	7	7	0	0	28
	Total	21	9	0	0	36
- Source: Loverugbyleague.com profile, Huddersfield Giants Profile As of 13 November 2014

Peter Aspinall (born 4 April 1994) is a former English rugby league footballer who last played for York City Knights. He previously played for Huddersfield Giants and Sheffield Eagles.
