= Ben Blackmore =

English rugby league footballer

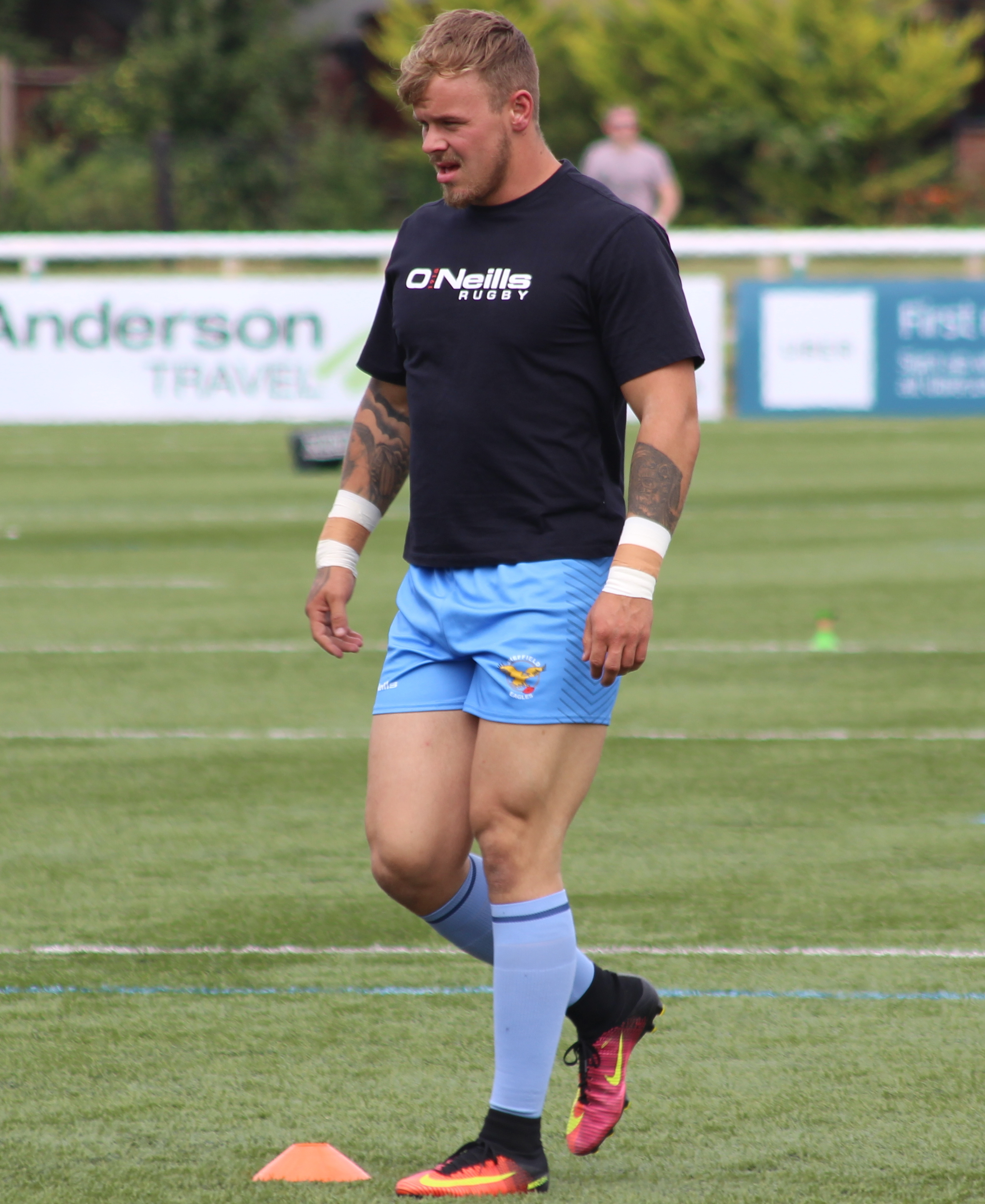

Personal information
- Full name: Ben Blackmore
- Born: 19 February 1993 (age 33) Castleford, West Yorkshire, England

Playing information
- Height: 6 ft 1 in (1.85 m)
- Weight: 17 st 3 lb (109 kg)
- Position: Wing
Club
Years	Team	Pld	T	G	FG	P
2012	Castleford Tigers	1	0	0	0	0
2013–14	Huddersfield Giants	3	4	0	0	16
2013(loan)	→ Doncaster	3	1	0	0	4
2013(loan)	→ Batley Bulldogs	1	1	0	0	4
2014(loan)	→ Batley Bulldogs	9	4	0	0	16
2014–15	Featherstone Rovers	35	20	0	0	80
2016–19	Sheffield Eagles	107	49	0	0	196
2020–21	Featherstone Rovers	6	5	0	0	20
2022	Dewsbury Rams	14	2	0	0	8
2023–24	Bradford Bulls	18	8	0	0	32
2024	Keighley Cougars	0	0	0	0	0
	Total	197	94	0	0	376

Ben Blackmore (born 19 February 1993) is an English former professional rugby league footballer who last played as a winger for Keighley Cougars in the Championship.

He previously played for the Castleford Tigers and the Huddersfield Giants in the Super League. Blackmore spent time on loan from Huddersfield at Doncaster and the Batley Bulldogs in the Championship. He has also played for Featherstone and the Sheffield Eagles in the Championship.

== Background ==
Blackmore was born in Castleford, West Yorkshire, England.

== Career ==
=== Castleford Tigers ===
Blackmore hails from Castleford and has come through the ranks at Castleford Tigers.

Blackmore made his début against Hull F.C. in the Super League in September 2012. After the season ended, Blackmore signed for the Huddersfield Giants

=== Featherstone Rovers ===
In June 2014, he joined Featherstone Rovers for an undisclosed fee. Having had a successful spell at Featherstone Rovers, 35 games and 20 tries, Blackmore joined fellow Championship side the Sheffield Eagles. In 2019 he helped the Eagles to win the inaugural 1895 Cup as they defeated Widnes Vikings 36–18 in the final.

On 29 May 2021, it was reported that he had been handed a 10-week ban for posting a racist tweet.

=== Bradford Bulls ===
On 26 August 2022, it was announced that Blackmore had signed a one-year deal to join Bradford ahead of the 2023 season.

=== Keighley Cougars ===
On 31 May 2024 it was reported that he had signed for Keighley Cougars in the RFL League 1 for the remainder of the 2024 season

At the end of the 2024 season he announced his retirement from professional rugby league to concentrate on work commitments.
