= Tony Tonks =

English rugby league footballer

Personal information
- Full name: Antony Tonks
- Born: 27 April 1985 (age 41) Normanton, England

Playing information
- Height: 6 ft 1 in (1.85 m)
- Weight: 17 st 6 lb (111 kg)
- Position: Prop
Club
| Years | Team | Pld | T | G | FG | P |
|---|---|---|---|---|---|---|
| 2005–07 | Bradford Bulls |
| 2007 | Oldham | 20 | 3 | 0 | 0 | 12 |
| 2009–11 | Featherstone Rovers | 78 | 13 | 0 | 0 | 52 |
| 2012 | Huddersfield Giants | 1 | 0 | 0 | 0 | 0 |
| 2012–14 | Halifax | 63 | 6 | 0 | 0 | 24 |
| 2015 | Sheffield Eagles | 24 | 2 | 0 | 0 | 8 |
| 2016–17 | Dewsbury Rams | 31 | 4 | 0 | 0 | 0 |
| | Total | 217 | 28 | 0 | 0 | 96 |

Antony Tonks (born 27 April 1985) is an English rugby league footballer who plays as a prop for the Dewsbury Rams in the Kingstone Press Championship.

== Background ==
He was born in Normanton, West Yorkshire, England.

== Playing career ==
He began his career playing for the Wakefield Trinity Academy team before signing for Bradford Bulls. Tonks spent a season at Oldham, before signing for Featherstone Rovers after the National League Two Grand Final of 2008.

He has also represented Yorkshire Under-18s.

In October 2012, Tonks joined Huddersfield Giants on a one-year deal for the 2012 season, but missed the start of the season through suspension and then made only one appearance for the club before being injured in a reserve match. In July 2012, Tonks signed for Halifax in the Championship. In February 2014, during which time Tonks was at Halifax, players at the club had Electrocardiography (ECG) screening and Tonks became involved with Heartbeat of Sport; a charity that campaigned for ECG to be made compulsory throughout the sport. In October 2014, Tonks signed for Sheffield Eagles. In March 2015, following the death of Danny Jones, Tonks stated that he had "been trying to stress the need for screening, defibrillators and CPR training throughout the rugby league community and all sporting clubs". Tonks was offered a full-time contract at Sheffield but instead signed for Dewsbury Rams for the 2016 season. In 2017, Tonks suffered a shoulder injury that ended his playing career, though he stated that it had been his intention to retire at the end of the season.
