= Jamie Cording =

English rugby league footballer (born 1989)

Personal information
- Full name: Jamie Cording
- Born: 30 December 1989 (age 35); Featherstone, England
- Height: 6 ft 0 in (183 cm)
- Weight: 15 st 6 lb (98 kg)

Playing information
- Position: Second-row
Club
Years	Team	Pld	T	G	FG	P
2009	Gateshead Thunder	25	9	0	0	36
2011	Sheffield Eagles	9	2	0	0	8
2011(loan)	→ Huddersfield Giants	5	2	0	0	8
2012–13	Huddersfield Giants	24	6	0	0	24
2014–16	Featherstone Rovers	64	21	0	0	84
	Total	127	40	0	0	160
- Source: As of 10 March 2017

Jamie Cording (born 30 December 1989) is a rugby league footballer who last played for Featherstone Rovers in the Championship.

He previously played for the Huddersfield in the Super League and Featherstone Rovers, the Sheffield Eagles and Gateshead Thunder in the lower leagues.

In September 2013, Cording signed a two-year contract with Featherstone Rovers.
