= Jason Chan (rugby league) =

PNG international rugby league footballer

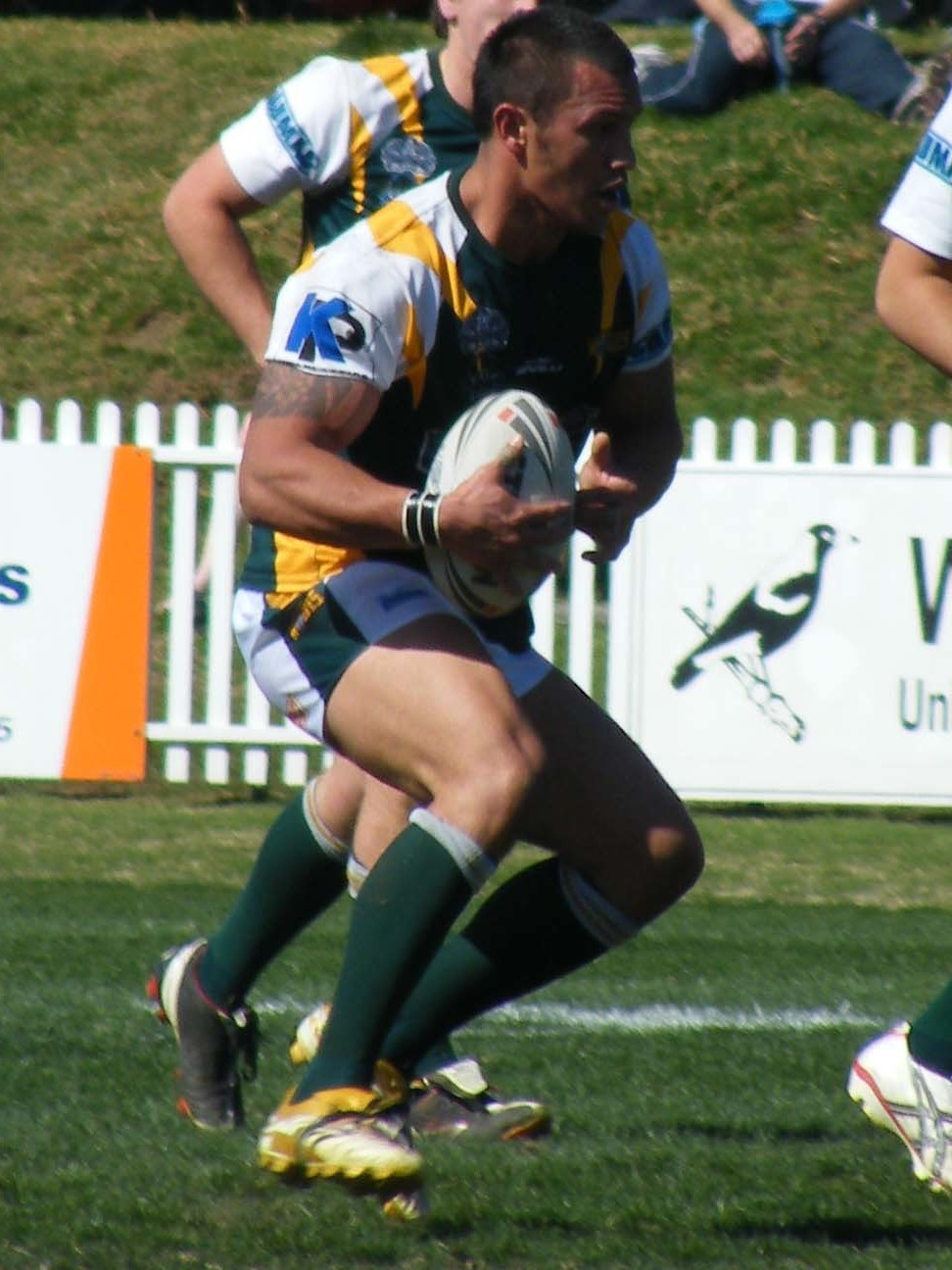

Personal information
- Born: 26 January 1984 (age 42) Sydney, New South Wales, Australia

Playing information
- Height: 183 cm (6 ft 0 in)
- Weight: 103 kg (16 st 3 lb)
- Position: Second-row, Prop, Centre
Club
Years	Team	Pld	T	G	FG	P
2009–11	Celtic Crusaders	75	15	0	0	60
2012–14	Huddersfield Giants	63	11	0	0	44
2014(loan)	→ Hull Kingston Rovers	6	3	0	0	12
	Total	144	29	0	0	116
Representative
Years	Team	Pld	T	G	FG	P
2008–13	Papua New Guinea	8	2	0	0	8

Jason Chan (born 26 January 1984) is a former Papua New Guinea international rugby league footballer who played for the Celtic Crusaders, the Huddersfield Giants and Hull Kingston Rovers in the Super League, primarily as a second-row, but also as a centre or prop.

== Background ==
He was born in Sydney, Australia.

He is of Chinese descent.

== Early career ==
Chan played junior football for the Windsor Wolves in the Jim Beam Cup. His 16 tries and 64 goals helped the Wolves to win the 2008 title.

== Super League career ==
Chan joined the Crusaders in 2009 as they embarked on their first Super League season. Chan played 23 games for Crusaders that season, including all three of their wins. In 2010, Chan maintained his position in first team, earning the number 12 jumper. Following the demise of the Crusaders, Chan joined the Huddersfield Giants, starting in 2012.

Chan spent part of the 2014 season on loan at Hull Kingston Rovers. He returned to Australia at the end of the season.

== Representative career ==
In the lead up to the 2008 Rugby League World Cup, Chan was named to the Papua New Guinea training squad and subsequently was named to the final World Cup squad. He played in all three of Papua New Guinea's matches during the World Cup, scoring a single try for the Kumuls in their loss against England.

Chan was named as part of the Papua New Guinea squad for the 2009 Pacific Cup. Chan played in both games for PNG, scoring a try in the first round against Tonga.

He played for Papua New Guinea in the 2013 Rugby League World Cup.
