= Jacob Fairbank =

English rugby league footballer

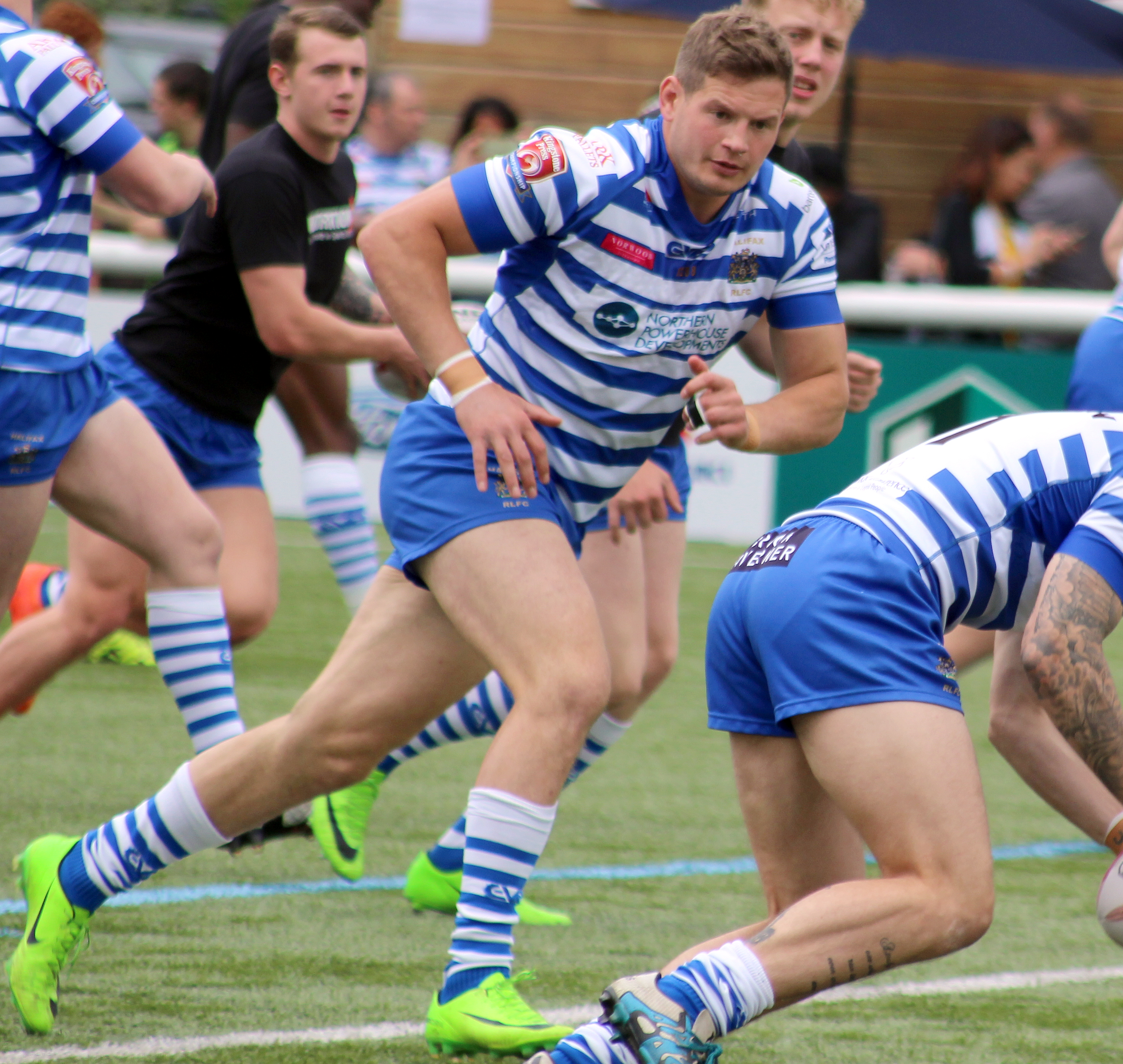

Personal information
- Born: 4 March 1990 (age 36) Halifax, West Yorkshire, England
- Height: 6 ft 0 in (183 cm)
- Weight: 15 st 8 lb (99 kg)

Playing information
- Position: Loose forward, Prop, Second-row
Club
Years	Team	Pld	T	G	FG	P
2011–15	Huddersfield Giants	17	0	0	0	0
2011(loan)	→ Halifax	20	2	0	0	8
2013(loan)	→ Batley Bulldogs	8	0	0	0	0
2013(loan)	→ Bradford Bulls	2	0	0	0	0
2013(loan)	→ London Broncos	6	1	0	0	4
2014(loan)	→ Batley Bulldogs	2	1	0	0	4
2014(loan)	→ Wakefield Trinity Wildcats	4	0	0	0	0
2015(loan)	→ Halifax	7	0	0	0	0
2015(loan)	→ Oldham	1	1	0	0	4
2015–	Halifax	225	28	0	0	112
	Total	292	33	0	0	132
- Source: As of 20 November 2026
- Relatives: Karl Fairbank (uncle)

Jacob Fairbank (born 4 March 1990) is an English professional rugby league footballer who plays prop, second-row and loose forward for Halifax in the Championship.

== Background ==
Fairbank was born in Halifax, West Yorkshire, England.

He is the nephew of Bradford Northern legend Karl Fairbank.

== Huddersfield ==
Fairbank signed for Huddersfield, and progressed through the youth system, finally making his début in Round 23 of the 2011 season against Hull Kingston Rovers. Since then he made a number of appearances for the first team. He also spent time on loan at Oldham RLFC.

== Bradford ==
In 2013, he was offered the chance to go to another Super League side on loan, Bradford Bulls. Fairbank signed a one-month deal at Bradford after they suffered an injury crisis in their pack. Fairbank featured in Round 15 (Salford) to Round 16 (Huddersfield). He was injured for Round 17-18.

== Wakefield Trinity Wildcats ==
On 1 May 2014, Fairbank signed for the Wakefield Trinity Wildcats on a one-month loan deal.

== Halifax ==
In 2015, Fairbank signed a contract to join Halifax.

== Statistics ==
Season	Appearances	Tries	Goals	D/G	Points
2011 Huddersfield	1	0	0	0	0
2012 Huddersfield	7	0	0	0	0
2013 Huddersfield	5	0	0	0	0
2014 Huddersfield	2	0	0	0	0
2015 Huddersfield	2	0	0	0	0
2013 Bradford	2	0	0	0	0
2013 Batley	2	0	0	0	0
2014 Batley	1	0	0	0	0
2013 London Broncos	6	1	0	0	4
2014 Wakefield Trinity	4	0	0	0	0
Total	32	1	0	0	4
