= Kruise Leeming =

England international rugby league player

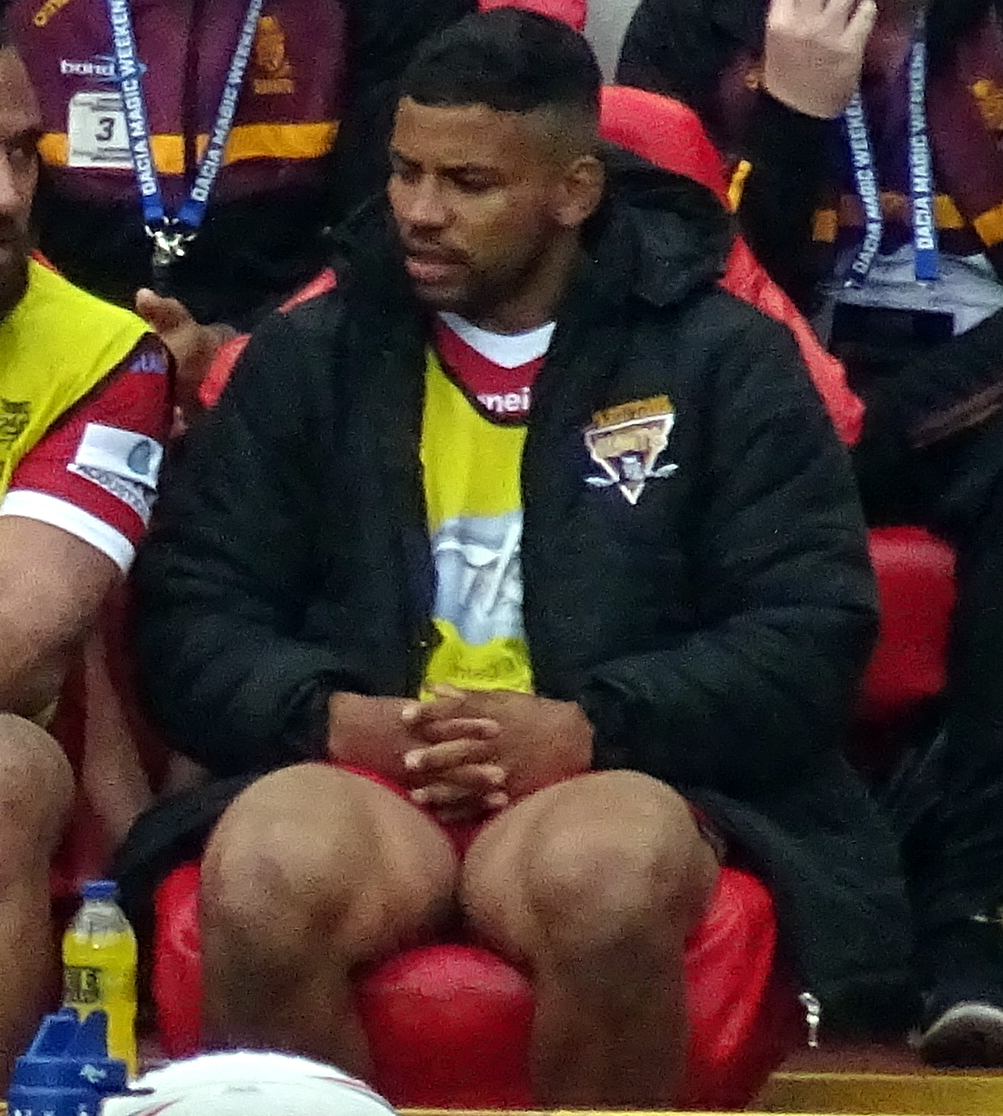

Personal information
- Full name: Kruise Palmer Leeming
- Born: 7 September 1995 (age 31) Lobamba, Eswatini
- Height: 5 ft 9 in (1.75 m)
- Weight: 13 st 10 lb (87 kg)

Playing information
- Position: Hooker
Club
Years	Team	Pld	T	G	FG	P
2013–19	Huddersfield Giants	122	15	0	0	60
2016(loan)	→ Oldham	4	0	0	0	0
2020–23	Leeds Rhinos	65	18	0	2	74
2023	Gold Coast Titans	10	2	0	0	8
2024–26	Wigan Warriors	57	12	0	0	48
2026	→ Catalans Dragons (loan)	27	4	0	1	17
2027–	Huddersfield Giants	0	0	0	0	0
	Total	285	51	0	3	207
Representative
Years	Team	Pld	T	G	FG	P
2018	England Knights	1	0	0	0	0
2021–22	Combined Nations All Stars	2	0	0	0	0
2021	England	1	0	0	0	0
- Source: As of 13 November 2026

Kruise Leeming (born 7 September 1995) is an England international rugby league footballer who plays as a hooker for the Huddersfield Giants in the Super League.

He played for the Huddersfield Giants and Leeds Rhinos in the Super League and on loan from Huddersfield in 2016 at Oldham in the Championship. At representative level, he has played for England, the Combined Nations All Stars, and England Knights.

== Background ==
Leeming was born in Lobamba, Eswatini (then Swaziland), but raised in Halifax, West Yorkshire, England.

Kruise is a graduate of the Giants' academy system. and was called up to the England Knights squad in 2019 along with 3 other Giants players.

== Club career ==
=== Huddersfield Giants ===
A product of Huddersfield's academy, Leeming made his Super League début against Warrington Wolves in 2013, and scored with his first touch of the ball. He went on to make one further appearances that year, and four appearances in 2014. Leeming established himself in the Huddersfield first-team in 2015, playing 15 times including an appearance from the bench in each of Huddersfield's Super 8s fixtures.

He has become a regular first team player since 2015 and was an integral part of the first team squad.

=== Leeds Rhinos ===
It was announced in early 2020 that Leeming would join Leeds.

On 17 October 2020, he played in the 2020 Challenge Cup Final victory for Leeds over Salford at Wembley Stadium.

In round 8 of the 2021 Super League season, Leeming scored two tries for Leeds in a 60-16 victory over Castleford. In the 2021 Magic Weekend, Leeming scored a try and kicked a drop goal in Leeds 25-24 victory over Hull FC. Leeming played a total of 23 games for Leeds in the 2021 Super League season including the club's 36-8 loss against St Helens in the semi-final. In round 17 of the 2022 Betfred Super League season, Leeming scored two tries for Leeds in a 62-16 victory over Hull F.C. On 24 September 2022, Leeming played for Leeds in their 24-12 loss to St Helens RFC in the 2022 Super League Grand Final. Leeming scored a try in the first half of the match.

=== Gold Coast ===
In March 2023, Leeming requested an immediate release from his Leeds contract which was granted by the club. On 2 April 2023, it was confirmed that Leeming had signed a one-year deal with the Gold Coast. Leeming became the second African-born man to play in the NRL after Jarrod Saffy.

=== Wigan Warriors ===
In July 2023, many clubs approached Leeming but following conversations with coach Matty Peet, Kruise signed a contract to join Super League side Wigan from 2024 on a four-year deal. In round 1 of the 2024 Super League season, Leeming made his club debut for Wigan in their 32-4 victory over Castleford. On 24 February 2024, Leeming played in Wigan's 2024 World Club Challenge final victory over Penrith scoring a try during the first half. On 8 June, Leeming played in Wigan's 2024 Challenge Cup final victory over Warrington from the interchange bench. On 12 October, Leeming played in Wigan's 9-2 2024 Super League grand final victory over Hull Kingston Rovers. On 9 October 2025, Leeming played in Wigan's 24-6 2025 Super League Grand Final loss against Hull Kingston Rovers.

=== Catalans Dragons (loan) ===
On 18 January 2026 it was reported that he had signed for Catalans Dragons on a season-long loan for the 2026 season from Wigan.

=== Huddersfield Giants (re-join) ===
On 7 September 2026 it was reported that he had re-signed for Huddersfield Giants in the Super League

== International career ==
In July 2018 he was selected in the England Knights Performance squad. Later that year he was selected for the Knights on their tour of Papua New Guinea. He played against Papua New Guinea at the Lae Football Stadium.

Kruise was called up to the England Knights squad in 2019 and selected for the test against Jamaica at Headingley Rugby Stadium.

In June 2021 he played for the Combined Nations All Stars in their 26-24 victory over England at Warrington, as part of England’s preparation for the ultimately postponed 2021 Rugby League World Cup. A year later, Leeming featured again as the All-Stars were defeated 18-4 as part of England's preparations for the postponed tournament.

== Honours ==
=== Huddersfield Giants ===
- League Leaders' Shield
  - Winners (1): 2013

=== Leeds Rhinos ===
- Challenge Cup
  - Winners (1): 2020

=== Wigan Warriors ===
- Super League
  - Winners (1): 2024
- World Club Challenge
  - Winners (1): 2024
- League Leaders' Shield
  - Winners (1): 2024
- Challenge Cup
  - Winners (1): 2024
