= Brett Ferres =

England international rugby league footballer

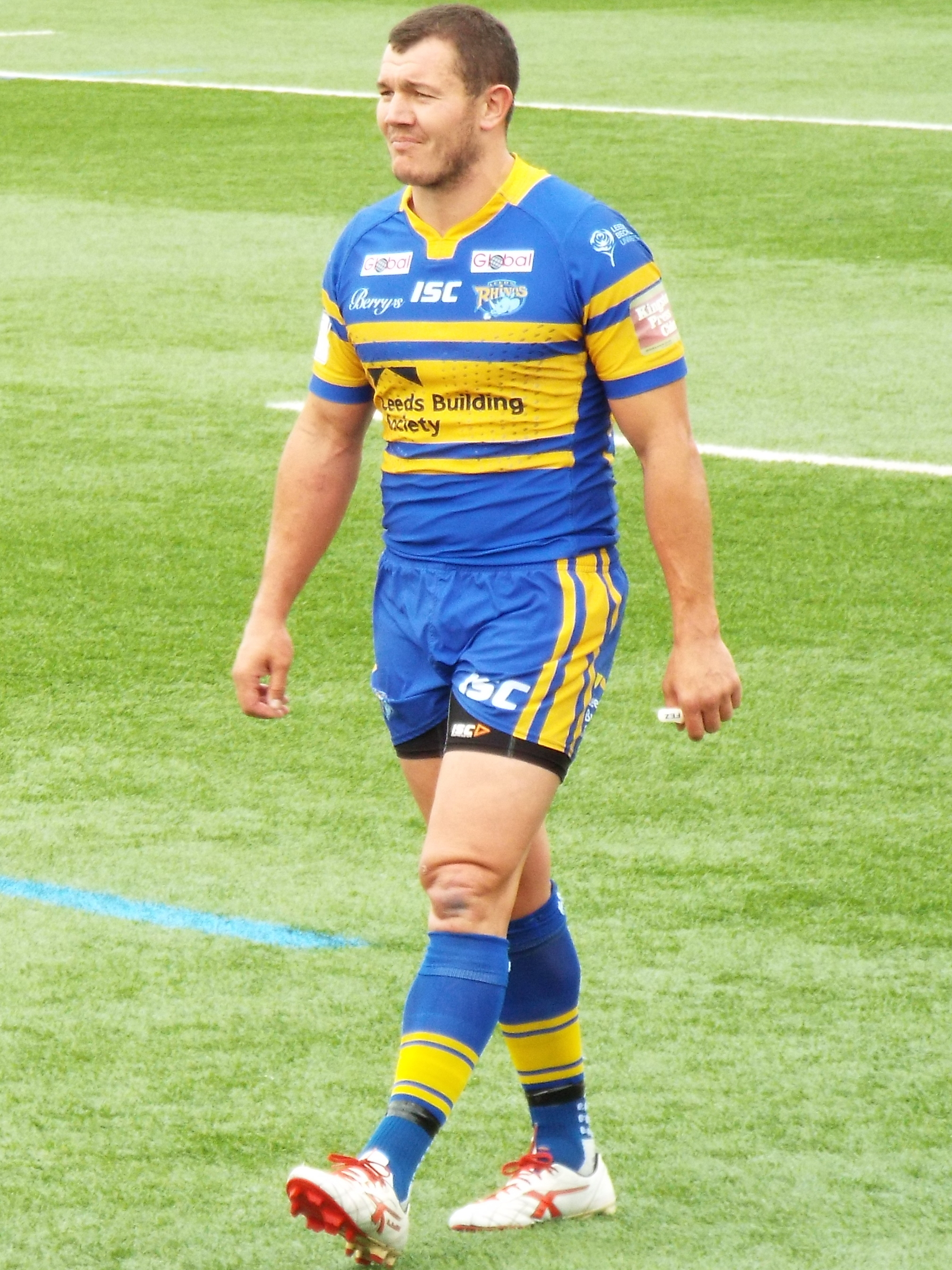

Personal information
- Full name: Brett Ryan Ferres
- Born: 17 April 1986 (age 40) Castleford, West Yorkshire, England
- Height: 6 ft 2 in (1.88 m)
- Weight: 16 st 5 lb (104 kg)

Playing information
- Position: Second-row, Loose forward, Centre
Club
Years	Team	Pld	T	G	FG	P
2005–06	Bradford Bulls	39	13	2	0	56
2007–08	Wakefield Trinity	41	7	6	0	40
2009–12	Castleford Tigers	89	27	0	0	108
2013–16	Huddersfield Giants	77	29	0	0	116
2016–19	Leeds Rhinos	90	15	0	0	60
2020–22	Featherstone Rovers	40	12	2	0	52
2023–24	Doncaster	43	6	0	0	24
2025–26	Goole Vikings	32	5	2	0	24
	Total	451	114	12	0	480
Representative
Years	Team	Pld	T	G	FG	P
2006–15	England	16	9	0	0	36

Coaching information
Club
Years	Team	Gms	W	D	L	W%
2027–	Goole Vikings	0	0	0	0
- Source: As of 3 November 2026

Brett Ryan Ferres (born 17 April 1986) is an English professional rugby league coach who is the head coach of the Goole Vikings in the RFL Championship. He is a former professional rugby league footballer who played for the Goole Vikings in the Betfred Championship, and has played for England at international level. He played initially as a centre and later as a second-row or loose forward.

He has previously played for the Bradford Bulls, Wakefield Trinity Wildcats, Castleford Tigers, Huddersfield Giants and the Leeds Rhinos in the Super League.

== Background ==
Ferres was born in Castleford, West Yorkshire, England, and was educated at Castleford Academy.

== Playing career ==
=== Bradford Bulls ===
Ferres was a member of the England academy side that toured Australia and New Zealand in 2004. In 2005 he made 9 first team appearances for Bradford Bulls, and was the regular goal kicker for the senior academy, a side he also captained, scoring 17 tries in only 17 appearances for the under-21s. As Super League champions Bradford faced National Rugby League premiers Wests Tigers in the 2006 World Club Challenge, Ferres played from the interchange bench in Bradford's 30–10 victory.

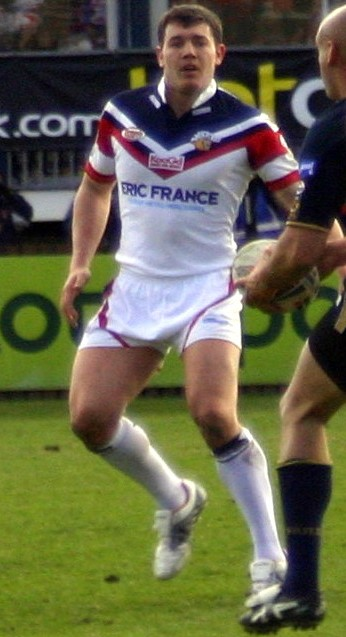
Ferres playing for the Wakefield Trinity Wildcats

=== Wakefield Trinity Wildcats ===
In late 2006, Ferres signed for Wakefield Trinity in exchange for David Solomona who went to the Bradford club.

=== Castleford Tigers ===
Ferres signed for Castleford on 7 November 2008 after being released from his contract with Wakefield Trinity.

On 2 July 2009 Ferres signed a new three-year deal to stay at Castleford.

=== Huddersfield Giants ===
In July 2012, Ferres signed for Huddersfield for a three-and-a-half-year deal. He was named at second-row in the 2013 Super League Dream Team. Immediately following the test series against New Zealand, Ferres was suspended by Huddersfield pending an investigation into his "conduct away from the club".

=== Leeds Rhinos ===
In January 2016, Leeds signed Brett Ferres from Huddersfield for an undisclosed fee.

He played in the 2017 Super League Grand Final victory over Castleford at Old Trafford.

=== Featherstone Rovers ===
Between 2020-2022, Ferres played for Featherstone in the RFL Championship. In December 2022, it was announced that he would be departing the club.

=== Doncaster ===
In 2023, Ferres joined Doncaster. On 15 November 2023, Ferres signed a one-year contract extension to remain at the club.

=== Goole Vikings ===
On 16 Oct 2024 it was reported that he had signed for Goole Vikings in the RFL League 1

== Coaching ==
=== Goole Vikings ===
On 3 September 2026 it was reported that he had taken the role of head-coach for Goole Vikings in the RFL Championship for 2027

== International career ==
Ferres won caps for England in 2006 against France, Tonga (2 matches) and Samoa in the 2006 Federation Shield tournament.

In 2013, Ferres was named in the English squad for the 2013 Rugby League World Cup. Ferres was selected after Gareth Hock breached team policy and was removed from the squad. Ferres featured in every game England played.

In 2014, Ferres played for England in the 2014 Four Nations held in Australia and New Zealand.

In 2015, Ferres was selected in the England 24-man squad to take on New Zealand in a test-series. Before the series began England played a match against France. Brett scored 3 of the 15 tries scored by England in the match in what was a demolishing of their opponents.

In 2016, Ferres was initially selected in the England 24-man squad for the 2016 Four Nations, but had to withdraw due to a knee injury.

== Honours ==
=== Club ===
- Super League: 2017
- League Leaders' Shield: 2013
- World Club Challenge: 2006

=== International ===
- Baskerville Shield: 2019
