= Jermaine McGillvary =

GB & England international rugby league footballer

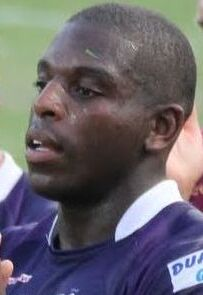
- McGillvary in 2015

Personal information
- Full name: Jermaine Darren McGillvary
- Born: 16 May 1988 (age 38) Huddersfield, West Yorkshire, England

Playing information
- Height: 5 ft 10 in (1.78 m)
- Weight: 15 st 13 lb (101 kg)
- Position: Wing
Club
Years	Team	Pld	T	G	FG	P
2008–23	Huddersfield Giants	313	209	0	0	828
2008(loan)	→ Batley Bulldogs	6	1	0	0	4
2009(loan)	→ Batley Bulldogs	24	21	1	0	86
2010(loan)	→ Barrow Raiders	11	8	0	0	32
2024	Wakefield Trinity	17	16	1	0	66
	Total	371	255	2	0	1016
Representative
Years	Team	Pld	T	G	FG	P
2012	England Knights	1	0	0	0	0
2015–18	England	17	12	0	0	48
2019	Great Britain	4	0	0	0	0
2021	Combined Nations All Stars	1	1	0	0	4
- Relatives: Leroy Cudjoe (cousin)

Jermaine McGillvary (born 16 May 1988) is an English former professional rugby league footballer who played as a winger. He spent the majority of his club career with Huddersfield in the Super League, but also spent time on loan at Batley and Barrow in the Championship. He finished his career with Wakefield Trinity in the RFL Championship.

At international level, he represented the England Knights, England and Great Britain.

== Background ==
McGillvary was born in Huddersfield, West Yorkshire, England, and he is of Grenadian descent. He played junior rugby league for Deighton, but quit the sport after the club folded, and switched to football instead, playing for Dalton Dynamoes, and at semi-professional level for Emley. He was working as an apprentice bricklayer when he was persuaded by his cousin, Leroy Cudjoe, to return to rugby league, and he began training with the Huddersfield Giants reserve team.

== Playing career ==
=== Huddersfield Giants ===
After impressing in the reserves and a successful loan spell at Batley Bulldogs, McGillvary signed a full-time contract with the Huddersfield Giants in August 2008. McGillvary was sent back out on loan to Batley for the 2009 Championship season. He scored 21 tries for the club during the season, including five in a single match against Whitehaven on 24 May 2009, equalling the club record. His performances earned him a nomination for the Young Player of the Year award, and he was named in the 2009 Championship team of the season.

McGillvary spent the first part of the 2010 season with Barrow Raiders, scoring eight tries in 11 appearances. He made his Super League début for Huddersfield in June 2010, scoring two tries in a 52–6 win against Bradford Bulls.

McGillvary's breakthrough came in 2011, starting all but one game for Huddersfield during the season, and scoring 17 tries. He signed a new five-year contract with the club, and was awarded the Albert Goldthorpe Rookie of the Year Medal.

In the 2013 Super League season, McGillvary played 27 games and scored 19 tries as Huddersfield claimed the League Leaders Shield for the first time in 81 years. Huddersfield would ultimately fall short of a grand final appearance that year. On 4 May 2014, McGillvary made his 100th appearance for Huddersfield. Fittingly he scored a try in his team's crucial one point win over third placed Super League team, the Castleford Tigers.

McGillvary finished as Super League's top try scorer in 2015, with 27, and earned selection in the Super League Dream Team. On 4 October 2020, McGillvary scored two tries in a 32–22 victory over Hull KR. In the process, he moved into the Super League's top ten highest ever try scorers list.

In round 15 of the 2021 Super League season, he scored four tries in Huddersfield's 40–26 victory over Hull F.C. In the 2022 Challenge Cup semi-final, McGillvary earned man of the match honours as Huddersfield defeated Hull Kingston Rovers 25–4 at Elland Road. On 28 May 2022, McGillvary played for Huddersfield in their 2022 Challenge Cup Final loss against Wigan. McGillvary scored a second half try during the match. In round 18 of the Super League XXVII season, McGillvary scored two tries for Huddersfield in a 30–18 victory over Salford at Magic Weekend. McGillvary played 13 games in the 2023 Super League season and scored six tries as Huddersfield finished ninth on the table and missed the playoffs.

=== Wakefield Trinity ===
On 28 October 2023 he joined Wakefield Trinity for the 2024 season. He went on to win the RFL 1895 Cup and the RFL Championship Leaders' Shield. McGillvary's final game as a player was the RFL Championship grand final against Toulouse Olympique where Wakefield would win 36-0. McGillvary would kick a goal from the sideline towards the closing stages of the match.

== International career ==
McGillvary's was selected in Steve McNamara's 24-man England team for their test series against New Zealand in 2015. He made his début for England in the decisive final test-match at the DW Stadium.

The following year, McGillvary was selected in the England squad for the 2016 Four Nations. Before the tournament, England played a test match against France in which McGillvary scored a try in England's 40–6 win.

Following the 2017 season, McGillvary was named in Wayne Bennett's England squad for the World Cup in Australia.

McGillvary played on the wing in England's 6–0 defeat by Australia in the 2017 Rugby League World Cup final. He finished the tournament with seven tries in five games and ran more meters than any other player in the tournament.

In 2018 he was selected for England against France at the Leigh Sports Village.

He was selected in England 9s squad for the 2019 Rugby League World Cup 9s.

He was selected in squad for the 2019 Great Britain Lions tour of the Southern Hemisphere. He made his Great Britain test debut in the defeat by Tonga.

On 25 June 2021 he played for the Combined Nations All Stars, and scored a try, in their 26–24 victory over England, staged at the Halliwell Jones Stadium, Warrington, as part of England's 2021 Rugby League World Cup preparation. McGillvary subsequently announced his international retirement in June 2022.
