= Scott Grix =

Former Ireland international rugby league footballer

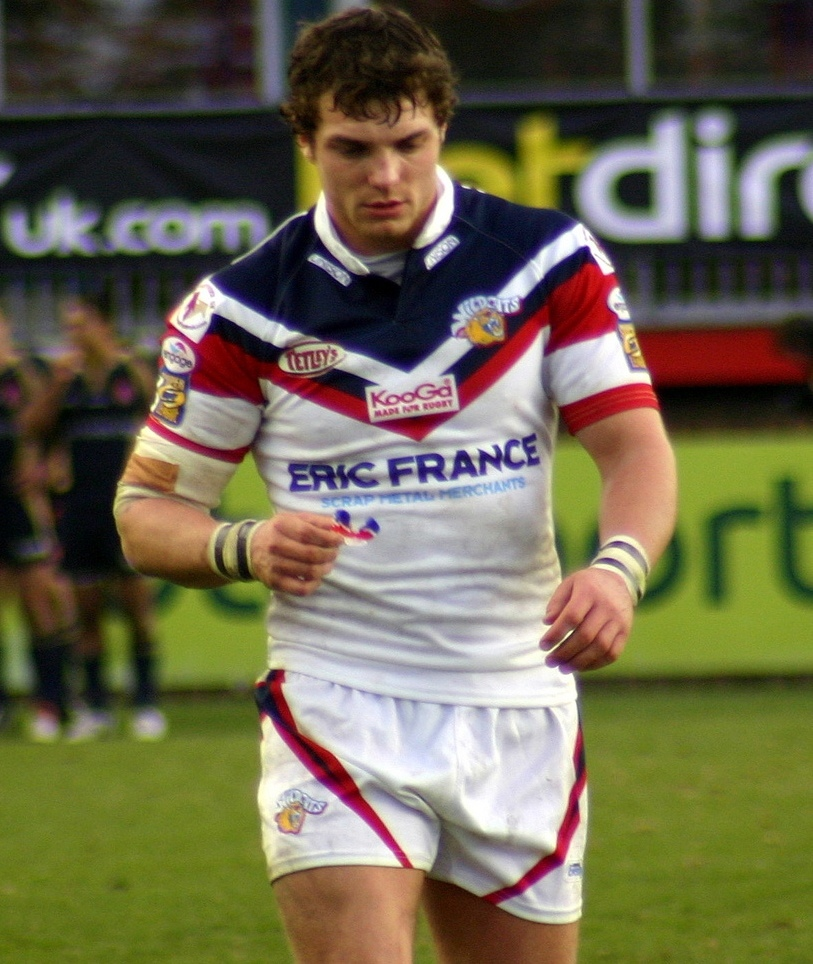

Personal information
- Full name: Scott Byron Grix
- Born: 1 May 1984 (age 42) Halifax, West Yorkshire, England
- Height: 5 ft 10 in (1.77 m)
- Weight: 13 st 5 lb (85 kg)

Playing information
- Position: Fullback, Stand-off, Wing
Club
Years	Team	Pld	T	G	FG	P
2003	Doncaster	9	3	2	0	16
2004	Halifax	18	8	0	0	32
2005	Limoux Grizzlies
2006	Leigh Centurions	28	13	0	0	52
2007	Widnes Vikings	32	21	0	0	84
2008–09	Wakefield Trinity Wildcats	46	20	0	0	80
2010–16	Huddersfield Giants	164	57	34	0	296
2017–18	Wakefield Trinity	44	14	0	0	56
2019	Huddersfield Giants	4	1	0	0	4
2019(loan)	→ Halifax	12	4	0	0	16
2020–21	Halifax Panthers	24	7	1	0	30
	Total	381	148	37	0	666
Representative
Years	Team	Pld	T	G	FG	P
2006–18	Ireland	22	7	0	0	28
- Source: As of 4 September 2026
- Relatives: Simon Grix (brother); Michael Collins (cousin)

Scott Byron Grix (born 1 May 1984) is a professional rugby league coach who is an assistant coach at the Leeds Rhinos in the Super League and a former Ireland international rugby league footballer who last played as a fullback or stand-off for the Halifax Panthers in the Championship.

He previously played for the Doncaster Dragons, Halifax, Leigh Centurions and the Widnes Vikings in National League One. Grix also played for the Limoux Grizzlies in the Elite One Championship, and Wakefield Trinity in the Super League in two separate spells. He also played for the Huddersfield Giants in two separate spells in the top flight, and spent time on loan from Huddersfield at Halifax in the Championship.

On 22 September 2021 he announced his retirement at the age of 37.

== Background ==
Grix was born in Halifax, West Yorkshire, England.

== International career ==
Grix is an Ireland international, making his début in 2006 against Russia. He was named as captain of the Ireland squad for the 2008 Rugby League World Cup, and was one of his countries better players in the tournament.

He later relinquished the captaincy to Liam Finn, however, he continued to feature for Ireland and was named in their squad for the 2013 Rugby League World Cup.

In October and November 2015, Grix played in the 2015 European Cup.

In 2016 he was called up to the Ireland squad for the 2017 Rugby League World Cup European Pool B qualifiers.

== Personal life ==
He is the older brother of fellow professional rugby league footballer Simon Grix, and cousin of professional association (soccer) footballer Michael Collins.

Grix runs a strength and conditioning facility in Halifax.
