= Aaron Murphy =

English rugby league footballer

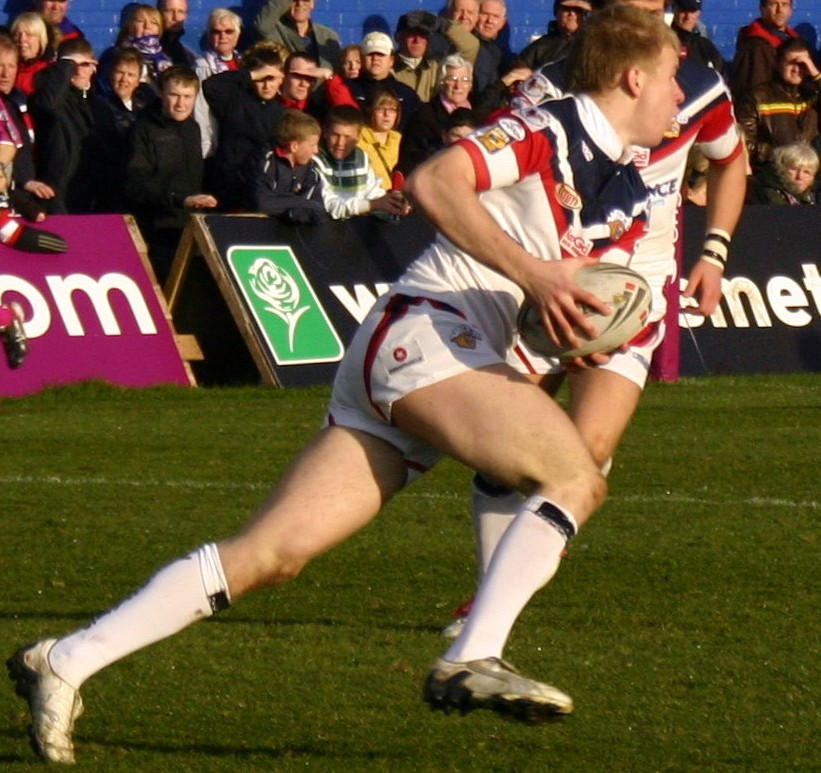

Personal information
- Born: 26 November 1988 (age 37) Leeds, West Yorkshire, England
- Height: 6 ft 0 in (183 cm)
- Weight: 15 st 2 lb (96 kg)

Playing information
- Position: Wing, Centre, Fullback, Second-row
Club
Years	Team	Pld	T	G	FG	P
2008–11	Wakefield Trinity Wildcats	64	16	0	0	64
2012–20	Huddersfield Giants	187	78	0	0	312
2021–22	Bradford Bulls	34	4	0	0	16
2023–	Sheffield Eagles	4	2	0	0	8
	Total	289	100	0	0	400
- Source: As of 12 March 2023

Aaron Murphy is an English rugby league footballer who plays for Sheffield Eagles in the Championship, as a fullback, wing, centre or second-row.

He previously played for the Wakefield Trinity Wildcats.

== Background ==
Murphy was born in Leeds, West Yorkshire, England.

== Career ==
He commenced his Super League career with Wakefield Trinity in 2008. In 2010, after an injury to the Wakefield Trinity first choice fullback Matt Blaymire, Murphy managed to hold down a regular first team place. In 2012 Murphy moved to the Huddersfield side where he became an integral part of the team, playing a big part in the clubs League Leaders' Shield win in 2013 and subsequent play off campaigns. At the end of the 2020 season he signed a two-year deal with RFL Championship side Bradford.
