= Shaun Lunt =

Former England international rugby league footballer

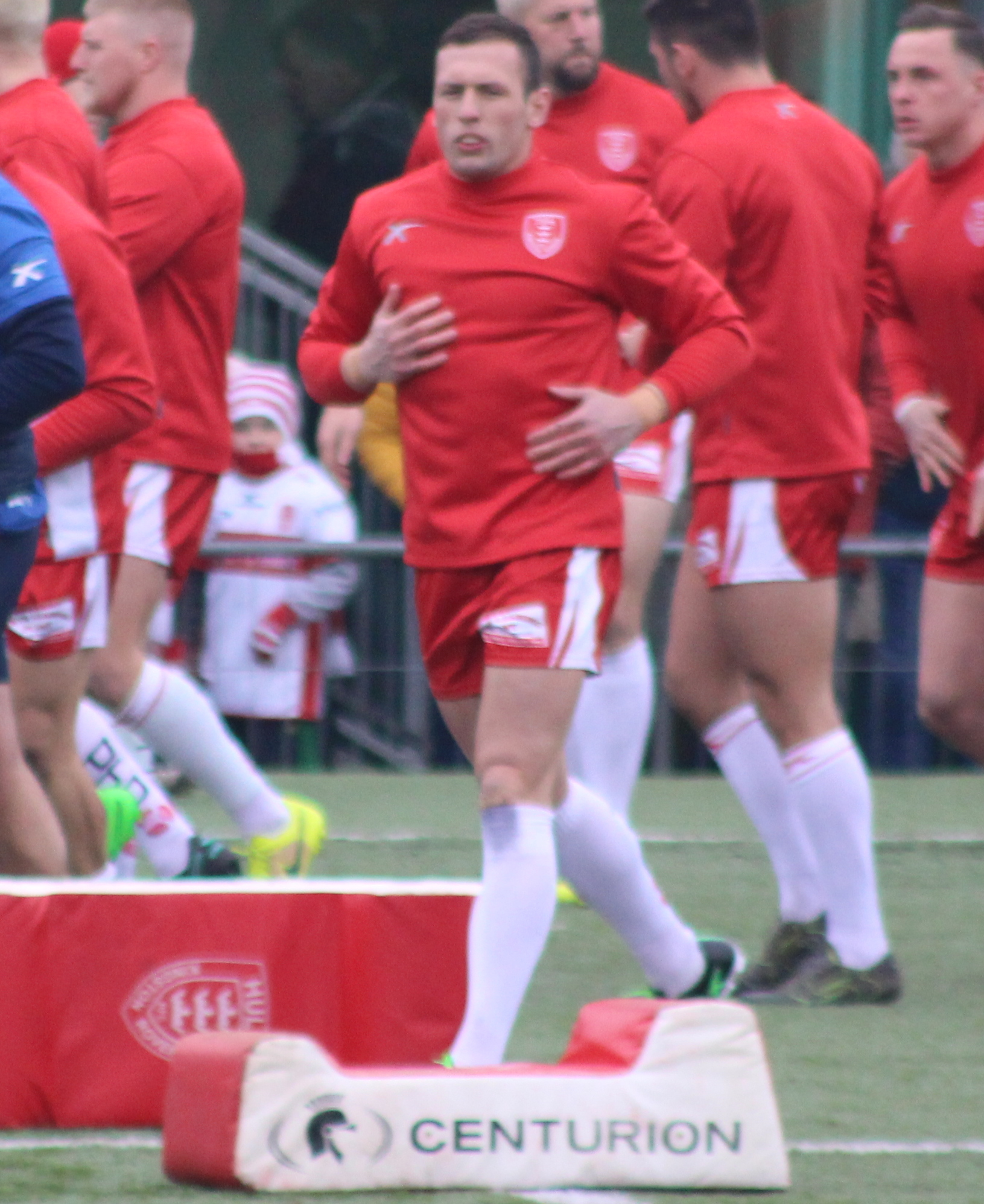

Personal information
- Full name: Shaun James Lunt
- Born: 15 April 1987 (age 38) Cockermouth, Cumbria, England

Playing information
- Height: 5 ft 11 in (180 cm)
- Weight: 14 st 13 lb (95 kg)
- Position: Hooker
Club
Years	Team	Pld	T	G	FG	P
2005	Castleford Tigers	4	0	0	0	0
2006–08	Workington Town	74	57	26	1	281
2009–15	Huddersfield Giants	123	71	0	0	284
2012(loan)	→ Leeds Rhinos	24	8	0	0	32
2015(loan)	→ Hull Kingston Rovers	19	7	0	0	28
2016–19	Hull Kingston Rovers	73	28	0	0	112
2019(loan)	→ Leeds Rhinos	6	0	0	0	0
2020	Batley Bulldogs	0	0	0	0	0
2021	Barrow Raiders	0	0	0	0	0
	Total	323	171	26	1	737
Representative
Years	Team	Pld	T	G	FG	P
2010	England	1	0	0	0	0
2012	England Knights	2	1	0	0	4

Shaun Lunt is an English former professional rugby league footballer who last played as a hooker for the Batley Bulldogs in the Championship, and has played for England and the England Knights at international level.

Lunt played for the Castleford Tigers in National League One, Workington Town in National League Two and the Huddersfield Giants in the Super League. He played on loan from Huddersfield at the Leeds Rhinos in the Super League. Lunt played for Hull Kingston Rovers, and on loan from Hull KR at the Leeds Rhinos in the Super League.

== Background ==
Lunt was born in Cockermouth, Cumbria, England.

== Career ==
=== Castleford Tigers ===
Lunt started his professional career at Castleford Tigers

=== Workington Town ===
Lunt then moved on to play for Workington Town.

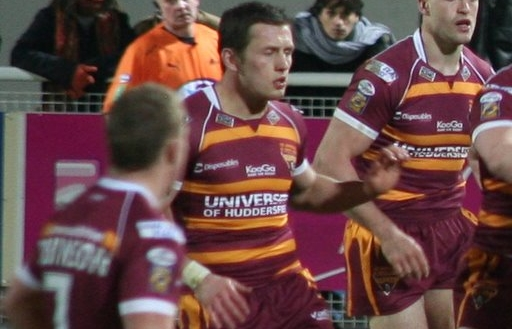
Lunt playing for Huddersfield in 2009

=== Huddersfield Giants ===
Lunt joined Huddersfield in time for the 2009 Super League season. Lunt has made a promising start to life in Super League, scoring a try on his début, and adding four more in the first half of the season. On 10 May 2009, Lunt scored his first career hat-trick for Huddersfield in the Challenge Cup fourth round against Rochdale in a 38-12 victory. He played in Huddersfield's 2009 Challenge Cup Final loss, scoring a try and having one disallowed in the process.

=== Leeds Rhinos ===
In 2012 he joined Leeds on a one-year loan. Lunt played in the 2012 Challenge Cup Final defeat by the Warrington side at Wembley Stadium. Lunt played in the 2012 Super League Grand Final victory over Warrington at Old Trafford.

=== Huddersfield Giants ===
Lunt returned from his loan spell with the Leeds club, and once again played for the Huddersfield side.

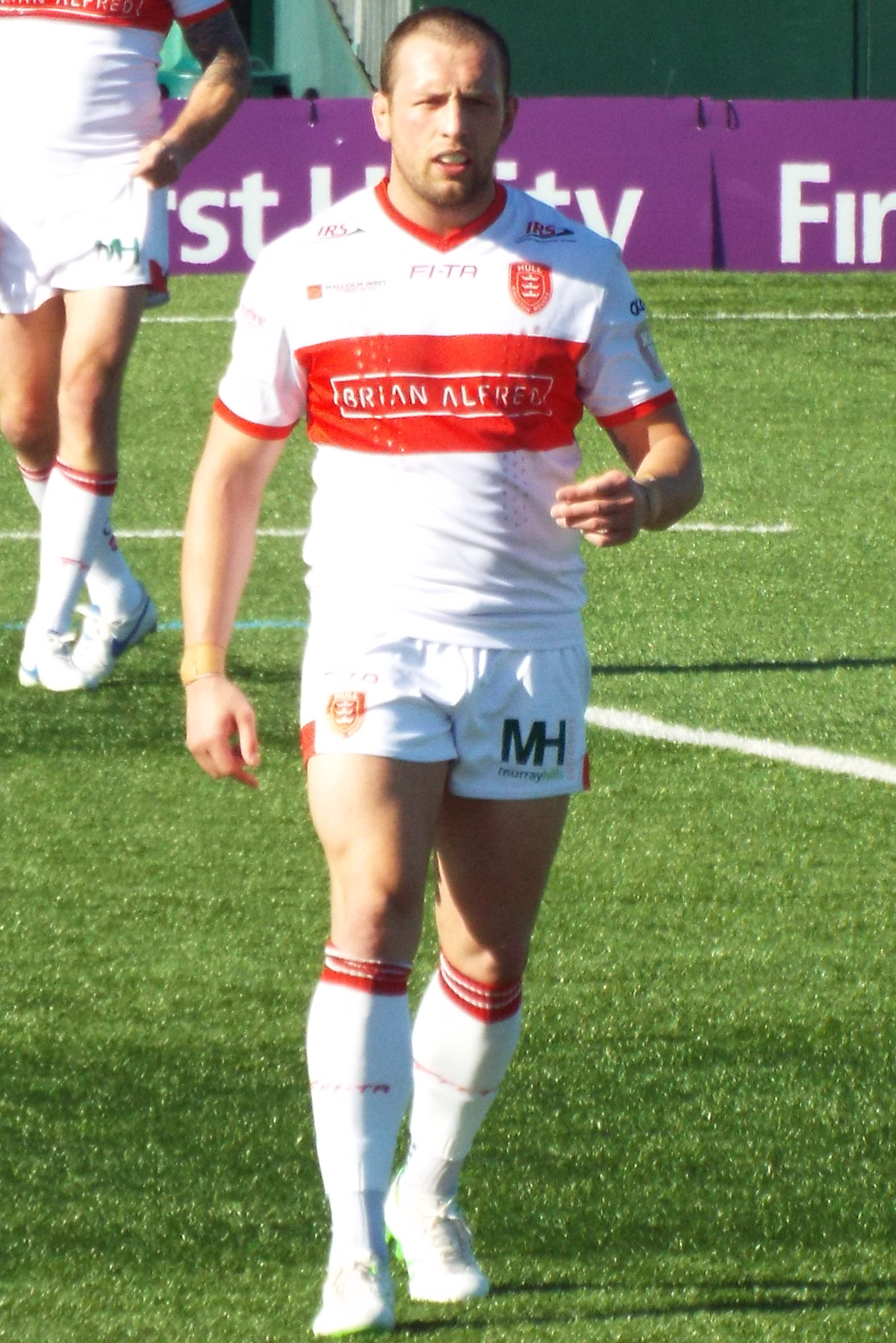
Lunt playing for Hull KR

=== Hull Kingston Rovers ===
Lunt went on loan to Hull Kingston Rovers in 2015 and signed for them in 2016. On 6 January 2017, it was revealed that Lunt would be captain of Hull Kingston Rovers for the 2017 season. On 26 June 2019, Lunt re-joined the Leeds club on a deal until the end of the season, swapping with Matt Parcell who joined Hull Kingston Rovers

=== Batley Bulldogs ===
On 21 November 2019 it was announced that Lunt would join Batley for the 2020 season.

=== Barrow Raiders ===
It was announced on 12 August 2020 that Lunt would leave Batley to join Barrow for the 2021 season.

Without playing a game for new club Barrow, Lunt announced his retirement from rugby league on 27 Feb 2021

== International career ==
Lunt represented England in 2010, and he played for the England Knights in 2012.

== Style of play ==
Lunt was known for his great speed out of dummy half and accurate distribution, along with his sharp eye for the try-line, which led to many tries from dummy half in his career.

== Honours ==
=== Club ===
Huddersfield

- Challenge Cup (1): 2009 Runner Up
- League Leaders' Shield (1): 2013

Leeds

- Super League (1): 2012
- Challenge Cup (1): 2012 Runner Up

Hull Kingston Rovers

- Challenge Cup (1): 2015 Runner Up
