= 2022 Huddersfield Giants season =

English rugby league season

2022 Huddersfield Giants Season
- Super League XXVII Rank: 3rd
- Play-off result: Eliminators
- Challenge Cup: Runner up

Team information
- Chairman: Ken Davy
- Head Coach: Ian Watson
- Captain: Aiden Sezer
- Stadium: John Smiths Stadium; Huddersfield, West Yorkshire
← 2021	List of seasons	2023 →

In the 2022 rugby league season the Huddersfield Giants competed in Super League XXVII and the 2022 Challenge Cup. They were coached by Ian Watson.

== Season review ==
On 12 February, Huddersfield began their Super League campaign with a 42–14 away win at Toulouse Olympique which they followed with a 26–12 win over Hull Kingston Rovers before suffering their first loss of the season at Wigan Warriors.

At the end of March, Huddersfield progressed from the sixth round of the Challenge Cup with a 30–16 win at Barrow Raiders and then defeated Hull F.C. in the quarter-finals. In May, a 25–4 win over Hull KR in the semi-finals saw Huddersfield reach the Challenge Cup final for the first time since 2009. The final was played at the Tottenham Hotspur Stadium where they lost 16–14 to Wigan. Meanwhile their good league form continued and included a run of six wins to the end of June.

On 18 August, Huddersfield secured their place in the play-offs with a 36–10 win over Castleford Tigers. In the final round of the regular season, a 16–14 win over Wakefield Trinity in extra time was enough to secure third place in the table. In the opening round of the play-offs, Huddersfield faced sixth-placed Salford Red Devils but saw their season ended by a 28–0 loss.

== Results ==
=== Pre-season friendlies ===
W Win L Loss

Pre-season results
Date	Versus	H/A	Venue	Result	Score	Tries	Goals	Attendance	Report
15 January	Dewsbury Rams	A	Crown Flatt	W	42–12				(Note: Michael Knowles Testimonial)
23 January	Batley Bulldogs	H	John Smiths Stadium	W	56–6				
30 January	Hull Kingston Rovers	A	Sewell Group Craven Park	L	18–24				

=== Super League ===
==== Table ====
Pos	Team	Pld	W	D	L	PF	PA	PD	Pts	Qualification
1	St Helens (C, L)	27	21	0	6	674	374	+300	42	Advance to Semi-finals
2	Wigan Warriors	27	19	0	8	818	483	+335	38	Advance to Semi-finals
3	Huddersfield Giants	27	17	1	9	613	497	+116	35	Advance to Elimination Finals
4	Catalans Dragons	27	16	0	11	539	513	+26	32	Advance to Elimination Finals
5	Leeds Rhinos	27	14	1	12	577	528	+49	29	Advance to Elimination Finals
6	Salford Red Devils	27	14	0	13	700	602	+98	28	Advance to Elimination Finals
7	Castleford Tigers	27	13	0	14	544	620	−76	26	
8	Hull Kingston Rovers	27	12	0	15	498	608	−110	24	
9	Hull FC	27	11	0	16	508	675	−167	22	
10	Wakefield Trinity	27	10	0	17	497	648	−151	20	
11	Warrington Wolves	27	9	0	18	568	664	−96	18	
12	Toulouse Olympique (R)	27	5	0	22	421	745	−324	10	Relegated to the Championship

(C) Champions; (L) League Leaders' Shield Winners; (R) Relegated

==== Super League results ====
W Win D Draw L Loss

Super League results
Date	Round	Versus	H/A	Venue	Result	Score	Tries	Goals	Attendance	Report
12 February	1	Toulouse Olympique	A	Stade Ernest Wallon	W	42–14	Wardle (2), Ashall-Bott, McQueen, I. Senior, L. Senior, Yates	Russell (7)	5,238	RLP
19 February	2	Hull KR	H	John Smiths Stadium	W	26–12	McQueen (2), Jones, McGillvary, Yates	Russell (2), Lolohea	5,724	RLP
24 February	3	Wigan Warriors	A	DW Stadium	L	12–22	Lolohea, McQueen	Pryce (2)	10,291	RLP
6 March	4	Salford Red Devils	H	John Smiths Stadium	W	34–2	I. Senior (2), Hill, McGillvary, McQueen, Pryce	Pryce (5)	5,702	RLP
29 April	11	Castleford Tigers	H	John Smiths Stadium	W	36–24	Leutele (3), McGillvary, Trout, Yates	Pryce (6)	5,717	RLP
20 March	6	Hull FC	A	MKM Stadium	L	6–14	McQueen	Lolohea	10,682	RLP
1 April	7	Catalans Dragons	H	John Smiths Stadium	W	28–12	Fages, Jones, Levi, Trout	Lolohea (5), Russell	3,845	RLP
14 April	8	Leeds Rhinos	A	Headingley	D	20–20	Leutele, McGillvary, I. Senior, Yates	Lolohea (2)	11,286	RLP
18 April	9	St Helens	H	John Smiths Stadium	L	12–24	Golding, Lolohea	Russell (2)	6,519	RLP
23 April	10	Warrington Wolves	A	Halliwell Jones Stadium	L	10–32	I. Senior, Yates	Russell	8,102	RLP
28 April	11	Wakefield Trinity	A	Be Well Support Stadium	W	14–12	Leutele, McQueen, Yates	Russell	3,166	RLP
12 May	12	Wigan Warriors	H	John Smiths Stadium	W	32–22	L. Senior (3), Hewitt, Leutele, Wardle	Russell (4)	4,962	RLP
20 May	13	Toulouse Olympique	H	John Smiths Stadium	W	17–16	I. Senior (2), Hewitt	Lolohea (2), Cogger (FG)	3,926	RLP
3 June	14	Catalans Dragons	A	Stade Gilbert Brutus	W	22–14	McQueen (2), Leutele, O'Brien	Pryce (3)	7,240	RLP
10 June	15	Leeds Rhinos	H	John Smiths Stadium	W	30–16	Jones, Leutele, McGillvary, McQueen, Wardle	Pryce (5)	6,712	RLP
26 June	16	Hull Kingston Rovers	A	Sewell Group Craven Park	W	38–10	Cudjoe (3), Leutele, McGillvary, Pryce, Yates	Pryce (5)	7,050	RLP
1 July	17	Castleford Tigers	A	Mend-A-Hose Jungle	L	12–13	McGillvary, McQueen, Pryce	Pryce (3)	5,627	RLP
10 July	18	Salford Red Devils	N	St James' Park	W	30–18	McGillvary (2), King, McQueen, Trout	Russell (5)	25,333	RLP
15 July	19	St Helens	A	Totally Wicked Stadium	L	0–25			11,288	RLP
23 July	20	Catalans Dragons	A	Stade Gilbert Brutus	L	12–13	Levi, McQueen	Pryce, Russell	6,845	RLP
30 July	21	Warrington Wolves	H	John Smiths Stadium	W	32–22	Golding, Jones, O'Brien, Pryce, I. Senior, Trout	Russell (4)	4,549	RLP
5 August	22	Hull FC	H	John Smiths Stadium	W	22–16	Levi (2), Fages, Lolohea	Pryce (3)	4,642	RLP
13 August	23	Salford Red Devils	A	AJ Bell Stadium	L	16–33	Hewitt (2), McQueen	Russell (2)	4,400	RLP
18 August	24	Castleford Tigers	H	John Smiths Stadium	W	36–10	I. Senior (2), Cudjoe, Leutele, Lolohea, McQueen, Russell	Russell (4)	4,168	RLP
24 August	25	Leeds Rhinos	A	Headingley	L	14–18	Cudjoe, Leutele, L. Senior	Russell	11,225	RLP
29 August	26	Warrington Wolves	H	John Smiths Stadium	W	38–36	Cudjoe, Jones, King, Leutele, Lolohea, O'Brien, Pryce	Pryce (5)	4,894	RLP
2 September	27	Wakefield Trinity	H	John Smiths Stadium	W	16–14	I. Senior (2)	Pryce (4)	5,524	RLP

==== Play-offs ====
Play-off results
Date	Round	Versus	H/A	Venue	Result	Score	Tries	Goals	Attendance	Report
10 September	Eliminators	Salford Red Devils	H	John Smiths Stadium	L	0–28			6,374	RLP

===== Team bracket =====
Eliminators
4	Catalans Dragons	10
5	Leeds Rhinos	20
3	Huddersfield Giants	0
6	Salford Red Devils	28

Semi-finals
2	Wigan Warriors	8
5	Leeds Rhinos	20
1	St Helens	19
6	Salford Red Devils	12

Grand Final
5	Leeds Rhinos	12
1	St Helens	24

Source:Rugby League Project

=== Challenge Cup ===
W Win L Loss

Challenge Cup results
Date	Round	Versus	H/A	Venue	Result	Score	Tries	Goals	Attendance	Report
27 March	6	Barrow Raiders	A	Craven Park	W	30–16	Ashworth, Ikahihifo, Leutele, I. Senior, Yates	Russell (5)	3,135	RLP
9 April	Quarter-final	Hull F.C.	H	John Smiths Stadium	W	24–16	Leutele, Lolohea, McQueen	Lolohea (6)	3,637	RLP
7 May	Semi-final	Hull Kingston Rovers	N	Elland Road	W	25–4	Jones, McGillvary, I. Senior, Trout	Russell (4), Fages (FG)	22,141	RLP
28 May	Final	Wigan Warriors	N	Tottenham Hotspur Stadium	L	14–16	Leutele, McGillvary, McQueen	Lolohea	51,628	RLP

== Players ==
=== Squad ===
2022 Huddersfield Giants
First team squad			Coaching staff
1 (England) Will Pryce – SO, FB, SH; 2 (England) Jermaine McGillvary – WG; 3; 4 (Samoa) Ricky Leutele – CE; 5 (Jamaica) Ashton Golding – WG, FB, HK; 6 (Tonga) Tui Lolohea – FB, SO; 7 (France) Theo Fages – SH; 8 (England) Chris Hill – PR; 9 (Samoa) Danny Levi – HK; 10 (Jamaica) Michael Lawrence (c) – PR, LF; 11 (England) Josh Jones – SR; 12 (England) Chris McQueen – SR; 13 (Australia) Luke Yates – LF	14 (England) Matty English – LF, PR; 15 (England) Joe Greenwood – PR, SR; 16 (Australia) Jack Cogger – SO, SH; 17 (England) Owen Trout – PR; 18 (New Zealand) Sebastine Ikahihifo – PR, LF; 19 (England) Adam O'Brien (vc) – HK; 20 (England) Oliver Wilson – PR; 21 (England) Leroy Cudjoe – CE, SO; 22 (Ireland) Louis Senior – WG, CE; 23 (England) Oliver Russell – SH, SO; 24; 25 (Ireland) Innes Senior – WG, CE; 26 (England) Nathan Mason – PR	27 (England) Jack Ashworth – SR; 28 (England) Robson Stevens – PR; 29 (England) Sam Hewitt – SR; 30 (England) Jon Luke Kirby – LF, PR; 31; 32 (England) Fenton Rogers – PR; 33 (Ireland) Aidan McGowan – FB; 34 (England) Kieran Rush – HK; 35 (England) George Roby – HK; 36 (Wales) Chester Butler – CE, SR (Out On Loan); 37 (England) Toby King – CE (Loan)	Head coach: Ian Watson; Assistant coach: Luke Robinson; Legend: (c) Captain(s); (vc) Vice-captain(s); Updated: 21 July 2022; Source(s): 2022 Squad Numbers

=== Transfers ===
==== Gains ====
List of players joining Huddersfield
Player	Club	Contract	Date
(England) Chris Hill	Warrington Wolves	2 Years	September 2021
(England) Nathan Mason	Leigh Centurions	1 year	September 2021
(Tonga) Tui Lolohea	Salford Red Devils	2 Years	September 2021
(Samoa) Danny Levi	Brisbane Broncos	2 Years	September 2021
(France) Theo Fages	St Helens	3 years	October 2021

==== Losses ====
List of players departing Huddersfield
Player	Club	Contract	Date
(England) Lee Gaskell	Wakefield Trinity	2 Years	June 2021
(England) Sam Wood	Hull KR	1 Years	July 2021
(Australia) Aiden Sezer	Leeds Rhinos	2 Years	July 2021
(England) Darnell McIntosh	Hull FC	3 Years	August 2021
(New Zealand) Kenny Edwards	Castleford Tigers	1 Year Loan	September 2021
(Scotland) Joe Wardle	Leigh Centurions	1 Year	October 2021
(England) James Cunningham	Toulouse Olympique	2 Years	October 2021
(England) Jacob Beer	Hunslet	1 Year	October 2021
(Wales) Chester Butler	Bradford Bulls	Season Loan	February 2022
(England) Olly Ashall-Bott	Toulouse Olympique	3 Years	February 2022
