= 2020 Huddersfield Giants season =

- Super League Rank: 7th
- Challenge Cup: 5th Round (lost to Toronto Wolfpack 0–18)
- 2020 record: Wins: 7; draws: 0; losses: 12
- Points scored: For: 318; against: 367

Team information
- CEO: Ken Davy
- Head Coach: Simon Woolford
- Captain: Aiden Sezer
- Stadium: John Smiths Stadium
- Avg. attendance: 6,574
- Agg. attendance: 6,574
- High attendance: 6,574
- Low attendance: 0

Top scorers
- Tries: Jermaine McGillvary (9)
- Goals: Aiden Sezer (37)
- Points: Aiden Sezer (105)
← 2019	List of seasons	2021 →

This article details the Huddersfield Giants's rugby league football club's 2020 season.

== Fixtures and results ==
Win Draw Loss

- All fixtures are subject to change

=== Challenge Cup ===
Date and time	Rnd	Versus	H/A	Venue	Result	Score	Tries	Goals	Attendance	TV	Report
11 March, 19:45	5	Toronto Wolfpack	H	John Smiths Stadium	L	0–18	—N/a	—N/a			

=== Regular season ===
Date and time	Rnd	Versus	H/A	Venue	Result	Score	Tries	Goals	Attendance	TV	Report
1 February, 17:00	1	Catalans Dragons	A	Stade Gilbert Brutus	W	32–12	McGillvary (2), Sezer, L. Senior, Wardle	Sezer (6)	8,254	—N/a	Report
2 August 2020, 18:30 (Note: Match postponed on original date due to poor weather conditions caused by Storm Ciara)	2	Leeds Rhinos	H	John Smiths Stadium	L	26–27 (Note: after golden-point extra time)	Senior (2), McIntosh (3)	Aiden Sezer (3)	0 (Note: Game Played Behind Closed Doors)	Sky Sports	
14 February, 19:45	3	Salford Red Devils	A	AJ Bell Stadium	W	12-10	O'Brien, Senior	Sezer (2)	3,350	Sky Sports	Report
21 February, 19:45	4	Hull KR	A	Kcom Craven Park	W	22–4	Senior, Gaskell, Clough, Matagi	Sezer (3)	7,350	—N/a	Report
1 March, 15:00	5	Wigan Warriors	H	John Smiths Stadium	L	10–42	O'Brien	Sezer (3)	6,574	—N/a	
6 March, 19:45	6	St. Helens	A	Totally Wicked Stadium	W	12–10	O'Brien, Jake Wardle	Sezer (2)	10,418	—N/a	
17 September 2020, 15:00 (Note: due to Huddersfields involvement in the challenge cup on 11 March, this game was rescheduled for a later date.)	7	Wakefield Trinity	H	John Smiths Stadium	W	29–6	McQueen, Matagi, Gavet, Sezer, Wardle	Sezer (4)	0	Sky Sports	
15 August 2020, 18:30	9	Warrington Wolves	A	Totally Wicked Stadium (Note: all games will resume behind closed doors, at neutral venues due to the COVID-19 pandemic in the United Kingdom)	L	18–19	Ta'ai, McGillvary, Russell	Sezer (2), Russell	0	Sky Sports	
30 August 2020, 16:15	10	Hull FC	A	Halliwell Jones Stadium	L	12–31	Turner, Golding	Russell (2)	0	Sky Sports	
4 September 2020, 18:00	11	St Helens	A	Emerald Headingley	L	6–54	Trout	Russell	0	Sky Sports	
11 September 2020, 20:15	12	Leeds Rhinos	A	Totally Wicked Stadium	L	12–13	English	Russell (4)	0	Sky Sports	
24 September 2020, 20:15	12	Castleford Tigers	A	Halliwell Jones Stadium	W	31–19	McGillvary (3), Wardle, Sezer	Sezer (5), +1DG	0	Sky Sports	
30 September 2020, 19:00	14	Hull KR	H	John Smiths Stadium	W	32–22	Golding, McGillvary (2), Cudjoe, McQueen, Jake Wardle	Sezer, Russell (4)		sky sports	
8 October 2020, 17:30	15	Salford Red Devils	A	Emerald Headingley	L	16–24	Sezer (2), Cudjoe,	Sezer (2)	0	Sky Sports	
13 October 2020, 17:30	16	Hull FC	A	Halliwell Jones Stadium	L	16–18	Sezer, English, McGillvary	Sezer (2)	0	Sky Sports	
20 October 2020, 20:45	17	Wakefield Trinity	A	Totally Wicked Stadium	L	14–18	Wood, Turner, Sezer	Gaskell	0	Sky Sports	
C–C (Note: Match cancelled after Super League meeting on 3 November rescheduled the play-offs and ended the regular season early.) (Note: Game postponed on 28 October due to 12 positive COVID-19 cases amongst the Castleford squad.)	18	Castleford Tigers									
30 October 2020, 18:00 (Note: Match originally set for Round 21, but brought forward as both clubs originally scheduled round 19 matches were postponed.)	21	Warrington Wolves	A	Totally Wicked Stadium	L	12–19	Gavet, Jake Wardle,	Sezer (2)	0	Sky Sports	
6 November 2020, 19:45	20	Wigan Warriors	A	Emerald Headingley	L	6–19	Wood,	Sezer	0	Sky Sports	

== League standings ==
Pos	Team	Pld	W	D	L	PF	PA	PP	Pts	PCT	Qualification (Note: Where teams have the same win percentage, position is decided by points scored percentage (points scored divided by points conceded).)
1	Wigan Warriors (L)	17	13	0	4	408	278	146.8	26	76.47	Semi-finals
2	St Helens (C)	17	12	0	5	469	195	240.5	24	70.59	Semi-finals
3	Warrington Wolves (Note: Salford forfeited a game against Warrington. Under RFL operational rules, the game is recorded as a 24–0 victory for Warrington and converse loss for Salford with the points scored/conceded applying to both teams.)	17	12	0	5	365	204	178.9	24	70.59	Elimination semi-finals
4	Catalans Dragons	13	8	0	5	376	259	145.2	16	61.54	Elimination semi-finals
5	Leeds Rhinos	17	10	0	7	369	390	94.6	20	58.82	Elimination semi-finals
6	Hull F.C.	17	9	0	8	405	436	92.9	18	52.94	Elimination semi-finals
7	Huddersfield Giants (Note: Huddersfield were placed on standby to take the place of any of the four teams in the elimination finals should one be unable to fulfil their fixture.)	18	7	0	11	318	367	86.6	14	38.89	
8	Castleford Tigers	16	6	0	10	328	379	86.5	12	37.50	
9	Salford Red Devils	18	8	0	10	354	469	75.5	10 (Note: Salford deducted 3 wins by the Rugby Football League for failing to meet the terms of a financial commitment agreed in 2013.)	27.78	
10	Wakefield Trinity	19	5	0	14	324	503	64.4	10	26.32	
11	Hull Kingston Rovers	17	3	0	14	290	526	55.1	6	17.65	

Source: BBC Sport
Rules for classification: 1) Points; 2) Points difference; 3) Number of points scored;
(C) Champions; (L) League Leaders' Shield Winners

== Player statistics ==
#	Player	Position	Tries	Goals	DG	Points	Red Cards	Yellow Cards
1	Ashton Golding	Fullback	0	0	0	0	0	0
2	Jermaine McGillvary	Wing	2	0	0	8	0	0
3	Jacob Wardle	Centre	0	0	0	0	0	0
4	Jordan Turner	Centre	0	0	0	0	0	0
5	Darnell McIntosh	Fullback	0	0	0	0	0	0
6	Lee Gaskell	Centre	1	0	0	4	0	0
7	Aiden Sezer	Scrum-half	1	14	0	32	0	1
8	James Gavet	Prop	0	0	0	0	0	0
9	Adam O'Brien	Hooker	2	0	0	8	0	0
10	Suaia Matagi	Prop	1	0	0	4	0	0
11	Kenny Edwards	Second-row	0	0	0	0	0	0
12	Joe Wardle	Prop	1	0	0	4	0	0
13	Michael Lawrence	Loose forward	0	0	0	0	0	0
14	Matty English	Prop	0	0	0	0	0	0
15	Oliver Wilson	Prop	0	0	0	0	0	0
16	Aaron Murphy	Wing	0	0	0	0	0	0
17	Ukuma Ta'ai	Second-row	0	0	0	0	0	0
18	Paul Clough	Prop	1	0	0	4	0	0
19	Akuila Uate	Wing	0	0	0	0	0	0
20	Oliver Roberts	Second-row	0	0	0	0	0	0
21	Leroy Cudjoe	Centre	0	0	0	0	0	0
22	Tom Holmes	Hooker	0	0	0	0	0	0
23	Oliver Russell	Scrum-half	0	0	0	0	0	0
24	Louis Senior	Wing	3	0	0	12	0	0
25	Innes Senior	Wing	0	0	0	0	0	0
26	Sam Hewitt	Centre	0	0	0	0	0	0
27	Sam Wood	Centre	0	0	0	0	0	0
28	Adam Walne	Prop	0	0	0	0	0	0
29	Jon Luke Kirby	Prop	0	0	0	0	0	0
30	Reiss Butterworth	Hooker	0	0	0	0	0	0
31	Chester Butler	Second-row	0	0	0	0	0	0
32	Owen Trout	Loose forward	0	0	0	0	0	0
33	Dominic Young	Wing	0	0	0	0	0	0

- As of Round 5 (1 March 2020)

== 2020 squad ==
2020 Huddersfield Giants
First team squad			Coaching staff
1 (Jamaica) Ashton Golding – FB; 2 (England) Jermaine McGillvary – WG; 3 (England) Jacob Wardle – CE; 4 (England) Jordan Turner – CE, LF, SR; 5 (England) Darnell McIntosh – FB, WG; 6 (England) Lee Gaskell – FB, CE, SO; 7 (Turkey) Aidan Sezer (c) – SH, SO; 8 (England) James Gavet – PR; 9 (England) Adam O'Brien (vc) – HK; 10 (New Zealand) Suaia Matagi – PR; 11 (New Zealand) Kenny Edwards – SR; 12 (England) Joe Wardle – SR, CE; 13 (England) Michael Lawrence – LF, SR, CE, WG	14 (England) Matty English – PR; 15 (England) Oliver Wilson – PR; 16 (England) Aaron Murphy – FB, WG, SR, CE; 17 (Tonga) Ukuma Ta'ai – SR, PR, LF; 18 (England) Paul Clough – PR, SR; 19 (Fiji) Akuila Uate – WG; 20 (England) Oliver Roberts – SR, LF; 21 (England) Leroy Cudjoe – CE, FB, WG; 22 (England) Tom Holmes – SH, SO, HK; 23 (England) Oliver Russell – SH; 24 (England) Louis Senior – WG, CE; 25 (England) Innes Senior – WG; 26 (England) Sam Hewitt – CE, SR	27 (England) Sam Wood – WG, CE; 28 (England) Adam Walne – PR; 29 (England) Jon Luke Kirby – PR, SR; 30 (England) Reiss Butterworth – HK; 31 (Wales) Chester Butler – SR, CE; 32 (England) Owen Trout – LF, PR; 33 (England) Dominic Young – WG	Head coach: Simon Woolford; Assistant coaches: Luke Robinson; Willie Poching; Legend: (c) Captain(s); (vc) Vice-captain(s); Updated: 9 January 2019; Source(s): 2020 Squad Numbers

== 2020 transfers ==
Gains

Player	Club	Contract	Date
Chester Butler	Halifax R.L.F.C.	3 Year	May 2019
Kenny Edwards	Catalans Dragons	3 Year	September 2019
Joe Wardle	Castleford Tigers	Season Loan	October 2019
Ashton Golding	Leeds Rhinos	3 Year	October 2019
James Gavet	Newcastle Knights	2 years	October 2019
Aidan Sezer	Canberra Raiders	2 years	November 2019
Owen Trout	Leeds Rhinos	4 years	November 2019

Losses

Player	Club	Contract	Date
Alex Mellor	Leeds Rhinos	3 Year	June 2019
Jordan Rankin	Castleford Tigers	Season Loan	October 2019
Scott Grix	Halifax	N/A	October 2019
Sebastine Ikahihifo	Salford Red Devils	Season Loan	November 2019
Kruise Leeming	Leeds Rhinos	2 years	November 2019
