= 2021 Huddersfield Giants season =

English rugby league season

2021 Huddersfield Giants Season
- Super League XXVI Rank: 9th
- Challenge Cup: Quarter-finals

Team information
- Chairman: Ken Davy
- Head Coach: Ian Watson
- Captain: Aiden Sezer
- Stadium: John Smiths Stadium; Huddersfield, West Yorkshire
← 2020	List of seasons	2022 →

In the 2021 rugby league season, Huddersfield Giants competed in Super League XXVI and the 2021 Challenge Cup.

== Results ==
=== Super League ===
==== Table ====
Pos	Team	Pld	W	D	L	PF	PA	PP	Pts	PCT	Qualification (Note: Teams must have played at least 70% of scheduled fixtures to qualify for the play-offs.)
1	Catalans Dragons (L)	23	19	0	4	688	398	172.9	38	82.61	Semi-final
2	St. Helens (C)	21	16	0	5	548	229	239.3	32	76.19	Semi-final
3	Warrington Wolves	21	15	1	5	588	354	166.1	31	73.81	Elimination Semi-finals
4	Wigan Warriors	25	15	0	10	387	385	100.5	30	60.00	Elimination Semi-finals
5	Leeds Rhinos	24	13	0	11	556	440	126.4	26	54.17	Elimination Semi-finals
6	Hull Kingston Rovers	20	10	0	10	497	458	108.5	20	50.00	Elimination Semi-finals
7	Castleford Tigers	23	11	0	12	437	552	79.2	22	47.83	
8	Hull FC	21	8	1	12	409	476	85.9	17	40.48	
9	Huddersfield Giants	24	9	0	15	460	516	89.1	18	37.50	
10	Wakefield Trinity	24	9	0	15	482	548	88.0	18	37.50	
11	Salford Red Devils	22	7	0	15	402	584	68.8	14	31.82	
12	Leigh Centurions (R)	22	2	0	20	356	870	40.9	4	9.09	Relegated to the Championship

Rules for classification: 1) win percentage; 2) points scored percentage (points scored divided by points conceded).
(C) Champions; (L) League Leaders' Shield Winners; (R) Relegated

==== Super League results ====
W Win D Draw L Loss

Super League results
Date	Round	Versus	H/A	Venue	Result	Score	Tries	Goals	Attendance	Report
28 March	1	Hull F.C.	N	Emerald Headingley	L	10–22	Leutele, Gavet	Russell	— (Note: Played behind closed doors due to the COVID-19 pandemic) (Note: Broadcast on Sky Sports)	RLP
3 April	2	Catalans Dragons	N	Totally Wicked Stadium	L	10–20	McQueen, Wood	Wardle	—	RLP
16 April	3	Hull Kingston Rovers	A	Craven Park	L	24–25	McIntosh (2), McGillvary, McQueen, Wardle	Sezer (2)	—	RLP
22 April	4	St Helens	H	John Smiths Stadium	L	10–18	McGillvary, McQueen	Sezer	—	RLP
2 May	5	Leeds Rhinos	H	John Smiths Stadium	W	14–13	Sezer (2)	Sezer (2 + FG), Gaskell (FG)	—	RLP
17 May	6	Warrington Wolves	A	Halliwell Jones Stadium	W	26–20	Gaskell (2), Edwards, McGillvary	Sezzer (5)	4,000	RLP
23 May	7	Leigh Centurions	A	Leigh Sports Village	W	44–6	Leutele (2), Edwards, Lawrence, McGillvary, O'Brien, Wardle	Sezer (8)	2,008	RLP
30 May	8	Wakefield Trinity	A	Mobile Rocket Stadium	L	12–38	Gavet, Wardle	Sezer (2)	4,000	RLP
18 June	10	Salford Red Devils	H	John Smiths Stadium	L	8–9	Wardle	Sezer (2)	2,352	RLP
25 June	11	Hull FC	A	MKM Stadium	L	10–17	Ashall-Bott	Russell (3)	5,527	RLP
1 July	12	Catalans Dragons	H	John Smiths Stadium	L	12–50	Golding, Wardle	Russell (2)	1,904	RLP
5 July	13	Castleford Tigers	H	John Smiths Stadium	L	0–24	— (Note: Match forfeited by Huddersfield)			RLP
11 July	14	Wigan Warriors	A	DW Stadium	L	12–16	Cudjowe, McQueen	Russell (2)	4,439	RLP
16 July	9	Wigan Warriors	H	John Smiths Stadium	L	12–14	Peteru, Pryce	Russell (2)	2,139	RLP
22 July	15	Hull FC	H	John Smiths Stadium	W	40–26	McGillvary (4), Cudjoe, Peats, Pryce, Yates	Russell (4)	3,699	RLP
2 August	17	Castleford Tigers	A	Mend-A-Hose Jungle	W	34–16	Cudjoe (2), McGillvary, Peteru, Yates	Russell (7)		RLP
8 August	18	Wakefield Trinity	H	John Smiths Stadium	W	22–18	McGillvary (2), Senior, Wardle, Wood	Pryce	3,964	RLP
13 August	19	Salford Red Devils	A	AJ Bell Stadium	L	12–18	English	Pryce (4)		RLP
19 August	20	Leeds Rhinos	A	Headingley	L	12–18	Pryce, Trout, Wood		11,110	RLP
26 August	21	Warrington Wolves	H	John Smiths Stadium	L	6–26	Wardle	Russell	4,017	RLP
30 August	22	Hull Kingston Rovers	H	John Smiths Stadium	W	40–28	Greenwood, Jones, Leutele, Peteru, Pryce, Russell, Wood	Pryce (6)	3,652	RLP
5 September	23	Wakefield Trinity	N	St James' Park	L	18–32	Jones, Pryce, Wood	Pryce (3)	25,762	RLP
11 September	24	Catalans Dragons	A	Stade Gilbert Brutus	W	30–18	Ashall-Bott, Cogger, English, Jones, Senior	Russell (5)		RLP
19 September	25	Leigh Centurions	H	John Smiths Stadium	W	42–24	Senior (2), Cudjoe, Greenwood, Leutele, Pryce, Russell, Trout	Russell (5)	3,867	RLP

=== Challenge Cup ===
W Win L Loss

Challenge Cup results
Date	Round	Versus	H/A	Venue	Result	Score	Tries	Goals	Attendance	Report
11 April	3	Leigh Centurions	A	Leigh Sports Village	W	38–18	McGillvary (3), Wood (2), Edwards, Gaskell	Wardle (4)	— (Note: Broadcast on Our League)	RLP
7 May	Quarter-finals	St Helens	N	Headingley	L	18–23	McIntosh (2), Lawrence	Sezer (3)	—	RLP

== Players ==
=== Squad ===
2021 Huddersfield Giants
First team squad			Coaching staff
1 (Jamaica) Ashton Golding – FB; 2 (England) Jermaine McGillvary – WG; 3 (England) Jacob Wardle – CE; 4 (Samoa) Ricky Leutele – CE; 5 (England) Darnell McIntosh – FB, WG; 6 (England) Lee Gaskell – SO, CE, SH; 7 (Australia) Aidan Sezer (c) – SH, SO; 8 (Australia) Luke Yates – PR; 9 (England) Adam O'Brien (vc) – HK; 10 (Jamaica) Michael Lawrence – PR, LF, SR; 11 (Cook Islands) Kenny Edwards – SR; 12 (Scotland) Joe Wardle – SR; 13 (England) Josh Jones – LF, SR	14 (England) Matty English – PR; 15 (England) Joe Greenwood – PR; 16 (Australia) Jack Cogger – SO, SH; 17 (England) Chris McQueen – SR, LF; 18 (England) Jack Ashworth – PR; 19 (England) James Cunningham – HK; 20 (England) Oliver Wilson – PR, SR; 21 (England) Leroy Cudjoe – CE, WG; 22 (Samoa) James Gavet – PR; 23 (England) Oliver Russell – SH; 24 (Ireland) Louis Senior – WG, CE; 25 (England) Owen Trout – LF, PR; 26 (England) Jon Luke-Kirby – LF, PR	27 (England) Sam Wood – LF, PR; 28 (England) Sam Hewitt – SR, PR; 29 (Ireland) Ronan Michael – SR, PR; 30 (Wales) Chester Butler – SH; 31 (England) Olly Ashall-Bott – FB	Head coach: Ian Watson; Assistant coach: Luke Robinson; Legend: (c) Captain(s); (vc) Vice-captain(s); Updated: 15 January 2021; Source(s): 2021 Squad Numbers

=== Transfers ===
==== Gains ====
List of players joining Huddersfield
Player	Club	Contract	Date
(England) Jack Ashworth	St Helens	2 Years	November 2020
(England) James Cunningham	Toronto Wolfpack	2 Years	November 2020
(England) Joe Greenwood	Wigan Warriors	3 years	November 2020
(England) George Roby	Warrington Wolves	2 years	November 2020
(Australia) Jack Cogger	Canterbury Bulldogs	2 years	December 2020
(England) Josh Jones	Hull FC	1 year	December 2020
(Samoa) Ricky Leutele	Melbourne Storm	2 years	December 2020
(England) Luke Yates	Salford Red Devils	2 years	December 2020
(England) Olly Ashall-Bott	Widnes Vikings	1 Year	January 2021

==== Losses ====
List of players departing Huddersfield
Player	Club	Contract	Date
(England) Paul Clough	Widnes Vikings	1 Year	August 2020
(England) Dominic Young	Newcastle Knights	3 Years	August 2020
Ross Whitmore	Doncaster RLFC	1 Year	September 2020
(England) Adam Walne	Barrow Raiders	2 Years	September 2020
Travis Corion	Sheffield Eagles	1 Year	October 2020
(England) Reiss Butterworth	Dewsbury Rams	1 Year	November 2020
(England) Jordan Turner	Castleford Tigers	1 Year	November 2020
(New Zealand) Suaia Matagi	Castleford Tigers	1 Year (Loan)	November 2020
(Fiji) Akuila Uate	Retired	N/A	November 2020
Ben Tibbs	Halifax RLFC	1 Year	November 2020
(England) Innes Senior	Wakefield Trinity	1 Year Loan	December 2020
(England) Tom Holmes	Featherstone Rovers	1 Year	January 2021
(England) Sam Hewitt	Halifax Panthers	Season Loan	February 2021
