= List of Huddersfield Giants seasons =

Huddersfield Giants are an English professional rugby league club based in Huddersfield, West Yorkshire. Formed in 1864, the club has competed in the sport since the foundation of the Northern Union in 1895. This list details the club's achievements in all major competitions.

== Seasons ==
Season	League									Play-offs	Challenge Cup	Other Competitions	
Season	Division	P	W	D	L	F	A	Pts	Pos	Play-offs	Challenge Cup	Other Competitions	
1895–96	NRFU	42	10	4	28	194	274	24	20th				
1896–97	YSC	30	10	7	13	142	179	27	10th		R1		
1897–98	YSC	30	12	3	15	208	170	27	10th		R3		
1898–99	YSC	30	15	3	12	169	147	33	6th		QF		
1899–1900	YSC	30	17	4	9	181	110	38	5th		R3		
1900–01	YSC	30	17	1	12	241	130	35	6th		R2		
1901–02	NRFU	26	8	2	16	122	262	18	13th		QF		
1902–03	Div 1	34	13	2	9	116	196	28	15th		R1		
1903–04	Div 1	34	10	0	24	160	353	20	18th		R1		
1904–05	Div 2	26	14	2	10	231	143	30	5th		R2		
1905–06	Div 1	30	17	2	11	224	174	36	11th		PR	Yorkshire Cup	R1
1906–07	Div 1	32	13	0	19	469	477	26	19th		QF	Yorkshire Cup	R2
1907–08	Div 1	32	14	1	17	439	330	29	15th		R1	Yorkshire Cup	R2
1908–09	Div 1	34	21	3	10	504	292	45	5th		QF	Yorkshire Cup	R2
1909–10	Div 1	34	21	0	13	477	301	42	8th		R2	Yorkshire Cup	W
1910–11	Div 1	36	22	0	14	702	293	44	7th		R1	Yorkshire Cup	RU
1911–12	Div 1	36	31	1	4	996	238	63	1st	W	QF	Yorkshire Cup	W
1912–13	Div 1	32	28	0	4	732	217	56	1st	W	W	Yorkshire Cup	R1
1913–14	Div 1	34	28	2	4	830	258	58	1st	RU	SF	Yorkshire Cup	W
1914–15	Div 1	34	28	4	2	888	235	60	1st	W	W	Yorkshire Cup	W
1915–16	WEL	30	18	2	10	342	231	38	6th				
1916–17	WEL	26	4	4	18	129	368	12	23rd				
1917–18	Huddersfield did not take part in any competition during these seasons												
1918–19	Huddersfield did not take part in any competition during these seasons												
1919	Huddersfield did not take part in any league competition during this season											Yorkshire Cup	W
1919–20	Div 1	34	29	0	5	759	215	58	1st	RU	W	Yorkshire Cup	W
1920–21	Div 1	36	18	2	16	376	283	38	14th		SF	Yorkshire Cup	R1
1921–22	Div 1	36	23	1	12	608	271	47	4th	SF	R2	Yorkshire Cup	R1
1922–23	Div 1	34	26	0	8	644	279	52	2nd	RU	R2	Yorkshire Cup	R2
1923–24	Div 1	36	21	1	14	481	352	43	5th		SF	Yorkshire Cup	RU
1924–25	Div 1	36	21	1	14	458	351	43	7th		R2	Yorkshire Cup	R1
1925–26	Div 1	36	14	2	20	365	474	30	18th		R2	Yorkshire Cup	RU
1926–27	Div 1	40	16	0	24	414	562	32	23rd		R1	Yorkshire Cup	W
1927–28	Div 1	40	21	1	18	475	341	43	12th		QF	Yorkshire Cup	R1
1928–29	Div 1	38	26	4	8	476	291	56	1st	W	R2	Yorkshire Cup	R2
1929–30	Div 1	38	25	2	11	510	317	52	2nd	W	R1	Yorkshire Cup	R1
1930–31	Div 1	38	27	2	9	545	272	56	5th		R2	Yorkshire Cup	RU
1931–32	Div 1	38	30	1	7	636	368	61	1st	RU	R1	Yorkshire Cup	W
1932–33	Div 1	38	21	0	17	504	333	42	9th		W	Yorkshire Cup	R2
1933–34	Div 1	38	20	1	17	500	330	41	12th		SF	Yorkshire Cup	SF
1934–35	Div 1	38	22	3	13	552	379	47	7th		RU	Yorkshire Cup	R2
1935–36	Div 1	38	23	0	15	580	356	46	9th		SF	Yorkshire Cup	R2
1936–37	Div 1	38	21	1	16	671	405	43	11th		QF	Yorkshire Cup	R1
1937–38	Div 1	36	14	1	21	499	502	29	23rd		R2	Yorkshire Cup	RU
1938–39	Div 1	40	28	2	10	647	345	58	4th	SF	R1	Yorkshire Cup	W
1939–40	Season abandoned following the outbreak of the Second World War												
1939–40	WEL	28	19	1	8	545	340	39	2nd			Yorkshire Cup	R2
1940–41	WEL	25	14	2	9	422	297	30	3rd		QF	Yorkshire Cup	SF
1941–42	WEL	23	12	0	11	355	276	24	9th		R2	Yorkshire Cup	SF
1942–43	WEL	18	12	0	6	215	189	24	6th	R1	R2	Yorkshire Cup	RU
1943–44	WEL	21	7	1	13	223	230	15	11th		R2	Yorkshire Cup	SF
1944–45	WEL	24	8	6	10	281	252	22	9th		W	Yorkshire Cup	R1
1945–46	Div 1	36	27	1	8	688	286	55	2nd	RU	R1	Yorkshire Cup	R1
1946–47	Div 1	36	24	2	10	572	332	50	7th		R2	Yorkshire Cup	R2
1947–48	Div 1	36	26	2	8	669	240	54	3rd	SF	R1	Yorkshire Cup	SF
1948–49	Div 1	36	27	0	9	626	290	54	3rd	W	SF	Yorkshire Cup	R2
1949–50	Div 1	36	28	1	7	694	362	57	2nd	RU	R1	Yorkshire Cup	RU
1950–51	Div 1	36	20	2	14	575	410	42	9th		QF	Yorkshire Cup	W
1951–52	Div 1	36	26	0	10	785	446	52	4th	SF	R1	Yorkshire Cup	R2
1952–53	Div 1	36	27	2	7	747	366	56	4th	SF	W	Yorkshire Cup	W
1953–54	Div 1	36	24	0	12	689	417	48	6th		QF	Yorkshire Cup	SF
1954–55	Div 1	36	22	0	14	790	483	44	11th		R1	Yorkshire Cup	R2
1955–56	Div 1	36	18	1	17	606	544	37	14th		QF	Yorkshire Cup	R1
1955–56	Div 1	36	18	1	17	606	544	37	14th		QF	ITV Floodlit Trophy	R1
1956–57	Div 1	38	23	0	15	667	533	46	9th		QF	Yorkshire Cup	R2
1957–58	Div 1	38	17	1	20	531	675	35	18th		R1	Yorkshire Cup	W
1958–59	Div 1	38	18	0	20	573	677	36	19th		R2	Yorkshire Cup	R1
1959–60	Div 1	38	21	1	16	603	510	43	12th		R1	Yorkshire Cup	R2
1960–61	Div 1	36	18	2	16	449	429	38	14th		R2	Yorkshire Cup	RU
1961–62	Div 1	36	25	2	9	494	351	52	4th	W	RU	Yorkshire Cup	R1
1962–63	Div 1	30	14	0	16	298	278	28	9th		R1	Yorkshire Cup	R1
1962–63	Div 1	30	14	0	16	298	278	28	9th		R1	Eastern Divisional Championship	RU
1963–64	Div 1	30	10	0	20	264	413	20	14th		R1	Yorkshire Cup	SF
1964–65	Div 1	34	15	0	19	368	419	30	18th		R1	Yorkshire Cup	SF
1964–65	Div 1	34	15	0	19	368	419	30	18th		R1	Bottom 14 Championship	W
1965–66	Div 1	34	20	0	14	420	267	40	11th	R1	QF	Yorkshire Cup	SF
1966–67	Div 1	34	13	0	21	369	379	26	21st		R1	Yorkshire Cup	SF
1967–68	Div 1	34	17	2	15	343	336	36	15th	R1	SF	Yorkshire Cup	R2
1967–68	Div 1	34	17	2	15	343	336	36	15th	R1	SF	BBC2 Floodlit Trophy	PR
1968–69	Div 1	34	9	1	24	296	553	19	25th		R2	Yorkshire Cup	R1
1968–69	Div 1	34	9	1	24	296	553	19	25th		R2	BBC2 Floodlit Trophy	R2
1969–70	Div 1	34	17	1	16	377	395	35	15th	R1	R2	Yorkshire Cup	R2
1969–70	Div 1	34	17	1	16	377	395	35	15th	R1	R2	BBC2 Floodlit Trophy	PR
1970–71	Div 1	34	16	2	16	440	434	34	15th	R1	SF	Yorkshire Cup	R2
1970–71	Div 1	34	16	2	16	440	434	34	15th	R1	SF	BBC2 Floodlit Trophy	R2
1971–72	Div 1	34	17	0	17	394	435	34	17th		R2	Yorkshire Cup	R1
1971–72	Div 1	34	17	0	17	394	435	34	17th		R2	League Cup	R2
1971–72	Div 1	34	17	0	17	394	435	34	17th		R2	BBC2 Floodlit Trophy	R2
1972–73	Div 1	34	10	2	22	465	598	22	24th		R1	Yorkshire Cup	SF
1972–73	Div 1	34	10	2	22	465	598	22	24th		R1	League Cup	R2
1972–73	Div 1	34	10	2	22	465	598	22	24th		R1	BBC2 Floodlit Trophy	R1
1973–74	Div 2	26	9	0	17	363	394	18	10th		R1	Yorkshire Cup	R2
1973–74	Div 2	26	9	0	17	363	394	18	10th		R1	League Cup	R1
1973–74	Div 2	26	9	0	17	363	394	18	10th		R1	BBC2 Floodlit Trophy	PR
1973–74	Div 2	26	9	0	17	363	394	18	10th		R1	Captain Morgan Trophy	R1
1973–74	Div 2	26	9	0	17	363	394	18	10th		R1	Club Championship	PR
1974–75	Div 2	26	21	0	5	489	213	42	1st		R1	Yorkshire Cup	R1
1974–75	Div 2	26	21	0	5	489	213	42	1st		R1	League Cup	R1
1974–75	Div 2	26	21	0	5	489	213	42	1st		R1	BBC2 Floodlit Trophy	R1
1974–75	Div 2	26	21	0	5	489	213	42	1st		R1	Premiership	R1
1975–76	Div 1	30	5	0	25	370	657	10	15th		R1	Yorkshire Cup	R1
1975–76	Div 1	30	5	0	25	370	657	10	15th		R1	League Cup	QF
1975–76	Div 1	30	5	0	25	370	657	10	15th		R1	BBC2 Floodlit Trophy	R2
1976–77	Div 2	26	13	0	13	397	329	26	7th		R1	Yorkshire Cup	R1
1976–77	Div 2	26	13	0	13	397	329	26	7th		R1	League Cup	R1
1976–77	Div 2	26	13	0	13	397	329	26	7th		R1	BBC2 Floodlit Trophy	SF
1977–78	Div 2	26	18	0	8	502	324	36	4th		QF	Yorkshire Cup	R1
1977–78	Div 2	26	18	0	8	502	324	36	4th		QF	League Cup	QF
1977–78	Div 2	26	18	0	8	502	324	36	4th		QF	BBC2 Floodlit Trophy	PR
1978–79	Div 1	30	7	1	22	314	725	15	16th		QF	Yorkshire Cup	R1
1978–79	Div 1	30	7	1	22	314	725	15	16th		QF	League Cup	R1
1978–79	Div 1	30	7	1	22	314	725	15	16th		QF	BBC2 Floodlit Trophy	R2
1979–80	Div 2	26	10	0	16	363	423	20	12th		R2	RFL Yorkshire Cup	R1
1979–80	Div 2	26	10	0	16	363	423	20	12th		R2	League Cup	R1
1979–80	Div 2	26	10	0	16	363	423	20	12th		R2	BBC2 Floodlit Trophy	R1
1980–81	Div 2	28	18	1	9	429	310	37	5th		R1	Yorkshire Cup	SF
1980–81	Div 2	28	18	1	9	429	310	37	5th		R1	League Cup	R2
1981–82	Div 2	32	13	1	18	370	523	27	11th		R1	Yorkshire Cup	R1
1981–82	Div 2	32	13	1	18	370	523	27	11th		R1	League Cup	R2
1982–83	Div 2	32	13	1	18	397	524	27	12th		R1	Yorkshire Cup	R1
1982–83	Div 2	32	13	1	18	397	524	27	12th		R1	League Cup	R2
1983–84	Div 2	34	15	3	16	600	545	33	10th		R1	Yorkshire Cup	R1
1983–84	Div 2	34	15	3	16	600	545	33	10th		R1	League Cup	R1
1984–85	Div 2	28	12	1	15	476	476	25	13th		R1	Yorkshire Cup	R2
1984–85	Div 2	28	12	1	15	476	476	25	13th		R1	League Cup	R1
1985–86	Div 2	34	8	4	22	542	841	20	15th		R1	Yorkshire Cup	R1
1985–86	Div 2	34	8	4	22	542	841	20	15th		R1	League Cup	R1
1986–87	Div 2	28	8	0	20	456	673	16	15th		R1	Yorkshire Cup	R1
1986–87	Div 2	28	8	0	20	456	673	16	15th		R1	League Cup	PR
1987–88	Div 2	28	7	1	20	383	597	15	19th		PR	Yorkshire Cup	PR
1987–88	Div 2	28	7	1	20	383	597	15	19th		PR	League Cup	R1
1988–89	Div 2	28	9	1	18	400	615	19	18th		R1	Yorkshire Cup	R1
1988–89	Div 2	28	9	1	18	400	615	19	18th		R1	League Cup	R1
1989–90	Div 2	28	14	0	14	469	441	28	11th		PR	Yorkshire Cup	R1
1989–90	Div 2	28	14	0	14	469	441	28	11th		PR	League Cup	R2
1990–91	Div 2	28	13	1	14	493	477	27	11th		PR	Yorkshire Cup	R1
1990–91	Div 2	28	13	1	14	493	477	27	11th		PR	League Cup	R1
1991–92	Div 3	26	23	0	3	869	257	46	1st		PR	Yorkshire Cup	R2
1991–92	Div 3	26	23	0	3	869	257	46	1st		PR	League Cup	R1
1991–92	Div 3	26	23	0	3	869	257	46	1st		PR	Divisional Premiership	R2
1992–93	Div 2	28	15	0	13	565	548	30	3rd		R2	Yorkshire Cup	R2
1992–93	Div 2	28	15	0	13	565	548	30	3rd		R2	League Cup	PR
1992–93	Div 2	28	15	0	13	565	548	30	3rd		R2	Divisional Premiership	R2
1993–94	Div 2	30	20	0	10	661	518	40	5th		R4	League Cup	R2
1993–94	Div 2	30	20	0	10	661	518	40	5th		R4	Divisional Premiership	R1
1994–95	Div 2	30	19	3	8	870	539	41	3rd		QF	League Cup	R2
1994–95	Div 2	30	19	3	8	870	539	41	3rd		QF	Divisional Premiership	RU
1995–96	Div 2	20	6	0	14	395	485	12	9th			League Cup	R3
1996	Div 2	20	12	0	8	557	308	24	5th		R4		
1997	Div 2	20	16	0	4	630	320	32	2nd		R4	Divisional Premiership	W
1998	SL	23	2	0	21	288	825	4	12th		R4		
1999	SL	30	5	0	25	463	1011	10	14th		R5		
2000	SL	28	4	0	24	502	1026	8	12th		R4		
2001	SL	28	6	1	21	613	926	13	12th		QF		
2002	Div 2	27	26	1	0	1156	356	53	1st	W	R4	Championship Cup	W
2002	SL	28	11	1	16	628	715	23	10th		R4		
2004	SL	28	12	0	16	518	757	24	7th		SF		
2005	SL	28	12	0	16	742	791	24	8th		R4		
2006	SL	28	11	0	17	609	753	22	9th		RU		
2007	SL	27	13	1	13	638	543	27	5th	EPO	QF		
2008	SL	27	10	1	16	638	681	29	10th		R5		
2009	SL	27	18	0	9	690	416	36	3rd	PSF	RU		
2010	SL	27	16	1	10	758	439	33	5th	QSF	R5		
2011	SL	27	16	0	11	707	524	32	4th	PSF	QF		
2012	SL	27	14	0	13	699	664	28	7th	EPO	SF		
2013	SL	27	21	0	6	851	507	42	1st	SF	QF		
2014	SL	27	17	3	7	785	626	37	3rd	PSF	R4		
2015	SL	30	18	2	10	750	534	38	3rd	SF	R6		
2016	SL	23	6	0	17	511	569	12	12th		QF	The Qualifiers	3rd
2017	SL	30	11	3	16	663	680	25	8th		R5		
2018	SL	23	11	1	11	427	629	23	5th		QF		
2019	SL	29	11	0	18	571	776	22	10th		R6		
2020	SL	18	7	0	11	318	367	38.89	7th		R5		
2021	SL	24	9	0	15	460	516	37.50	9th		QF		
2022	SL	27	17	1	9	613	497	35	3rd	EPO	RU		
2023	SL	27	11	0	16	473	552	22	9th		R6		
2024	SL	27	10	0	17	468	660	20	9th		SF		
2025	SL	27	7	0	20	347	738	14	10th		R4		
2026	SL	27	8	0	19	509	765	16	12th		R4		

== Key ==
Key to league record:

- Pld = Matches played
- W = Matches won
- D = Matches drawn
- L = Matches lost
- F = Points for
- A = Points against
- Pts = Points
- Pos = Final position

Key to divisions:

- SL = Super League
- Div 1 = RFL First Division
- Div 2 = RFL Second Division
- YSC = Yorkshire Senior Competition
- n/a = Not applicable

Key to rounds:

- DNE = Did not enter
- PR = Preliminary round
- R1 = Round 1
- R2 = Round 2
- R3 = Round 3
- R4 = Round 4
- R5 = Round 5
- R6 = Round 6
- EPO = Elimination Play-off
- QF = Quarter-finals
- QSF = Qualifying Semi-final
- PSF = Preliminary Semi-final
- SF = Semi-finals
- RU = Runners-up
- W = Winners

Winners	Runners-up	Third place	Play-offs	Promoted	Relegated

Division shown in bold to indicate a change in division.
Top scorers shown in bold are players who were also top scorers in their division that season.

== Bibliography ==
- "Rugby League Hall of Fame". Archived from the original on 13 May 2008.
- "Huddersfield Giants - Seasons". Rugby League Project. Shawn Dollin, Andrew Ferguson and Bill Bates.
