= Louis Senior =

Ireland international rugby league footballer

Personal information
- Born: 30 May 2000 (age 26) Huddersfield, West Yorkshire, England
- Height: 6 ft 5 in (1.96 m)
- Weight: 16 st 1 lb (102 kg)

Playing information
- Position: Wing, Centre
Club
| Years | Team | Pld | T | G | FG | P |
|---|---|---|---|---|---|---|
| 2018–22 | Huddersfield Giants | 42 | 25 | 0 | 0 | 100 |
| 2021(loan) | → Oldham | 1 | 1 | 0 | 0 | 4 |
| 2023–24 | Hull Kingston Rovers | 18 | 8 | 0 | 0 | 32 |
| 2024(loan) | → Castleford Tigers | 4 | 5 | 0 | 0 | 20 |
| 2025– | Castleford Tigers | 26 | 3 | 0 | 0 | 12 |
| | Total | 91 | 42 | 0 | 0 | 168 |
Representative
| Years | Team | Pld | T | G | FG | P |
| 2022– | Ireland | 3 | 6 | 0 | 0 | 24 |
- Source: As of 22 August 2026
- Relatives: Innes Senior (brother)

Louis Senior (born 30 May 2000) is an Ireland international rugby league footballer who plays as a winger or centre for the Castleford Tigers in the Super League.

He has previously played for the Huddersfield Giants and Hull Kingston Rovers in the Super League, and has spent time on loan at Oldham in the RFL Championship.

== Background ==
Senior was born in Huddersfield, West Yorkshire, England.

Along with his twin brother Innes, Louis is a product of the Giants' academy system and both made their first team debuts over Easter 2018.

== Career ==
=== Huddersfield Giants ===
In 2018 he made his Super League début for Huddersfield against Leeds.

==== Oldham (loan) ====
On 27 May 2021, it was reported that he had signed for Oldham in the RFL Championship on loan.

=== Hull Kingston Rovers ===
On 7 July 2022, it was reported that Senior had signed for Hull Kingston Rovers in the Super League on loan for the remainder of the 2022 season, with a view to it becoming a permanent move for the 2023 season. Senior played a total of 17 games for Hull KR in the 2023 Super League season as the club finished fourth on the table and qualified for the playoffs. He played in the clubs semi-final loss against Wigan.

=== Castleford Tigers ===
On 16 April 2024, the Castleford Tigers announced the signing of Senior on an initial two-week loan deal, continuing on a rolling basis. Senior made his debut and scored his first try for the club in a 36-14 loss away at Wigan. A week later, his loan stay was extended until the end of the season. In round 10, Senior scored two tries against Leigh, with the second late on taking the game to extra time. On 22 May 2024, Louis signed a two-year deal to remain with Castleford from the 2025 season alongside his twin brother Innes, who was also at Castleford on loan. However, it was announced the following day that he suffered a ruptured quad and was expected to spend three to four months on the sidelines.

After navigating several setbacks with his recovery, Senior made his return from injury as a late interchange against Salford in May 2025, twelve months on from his injury. He returned to Castleford's starting line-up the following week as a centre and scored his first try of the season against Leeds. In round 14 against Hull, he shrugged off four defenders to score a try and was named in the Super League Team of the Week.

== International career ==
Senior scored two tries on debut for Ireland in their 48-2 victory over Jamaica in their opening fixture of the 2021 Rugby League World Cup. In Ireland's final group stage match against New Zealand, Senior scored two tries in their 48-10 loss.

== Club statistics ==
Appearances and points in all competitions by year
| Club | Season | Tier | App | T | G | DG | Pts |
|---|---|---|---|---|---|---|---|
| Huddersfield Giants | 2018 | Super League | 3 | 1 | 0 | 0 | 4 |
| Huddersfield Giants | 2019 | Super League | 13 | 8 | 0 | 0 | 32 |
| Huddersfield Giants | 2020 | Super League | 8 | 5 | 0 | 0 | 20 |
| Huddersfield Giants | 2021 | Super League | 10 | 4 | 0 | 0 | 16 |
| Huddersfield Giants | 2022 | Super League | 8 | 7 | 0 | 0 | 28 |
| Huddersfield Giants | Total | | 42 | 25 | 0 | 0 | 100 |
| → Oldham (loan) | 2021 | Championship | 1 | 1 | 0 | 0 | 4 |
| Hull Kingston Rovers | 2023 | Super League | 17 | 8 | 0 | 0 | 32 |
| Hull Kingston Rovers | 2024 | Super League | 1 | 0 | 0 | 0 | 0 |
| Hull Kingston Rovers | Total | | 18 | 8 | 0 | 0 | 32 |
| Castleford Tigers | 2024 (Note: On loan from Hull KR in 2024 before joining permanently in 2025) | Super League | 4 | 5 | 0 | 0 | 20 |
| Castleford Tigers | 2025 | Super League | 17 | 2 | 0 | 0 | 8 |
| Castleford Tigers | 2026 | Super League | 9 | 1 | 0 | 0 | 4 |
| Castleford Tigers | Total | | 30 | 8 | 0 | 0 | 32 |
| Career total | | | 91 | 42 | 0 | 0 | 168 |

As of match played 22 August 2026
