= Ashton Golding =

Jamaica international rugby league footballer

Ash Golding
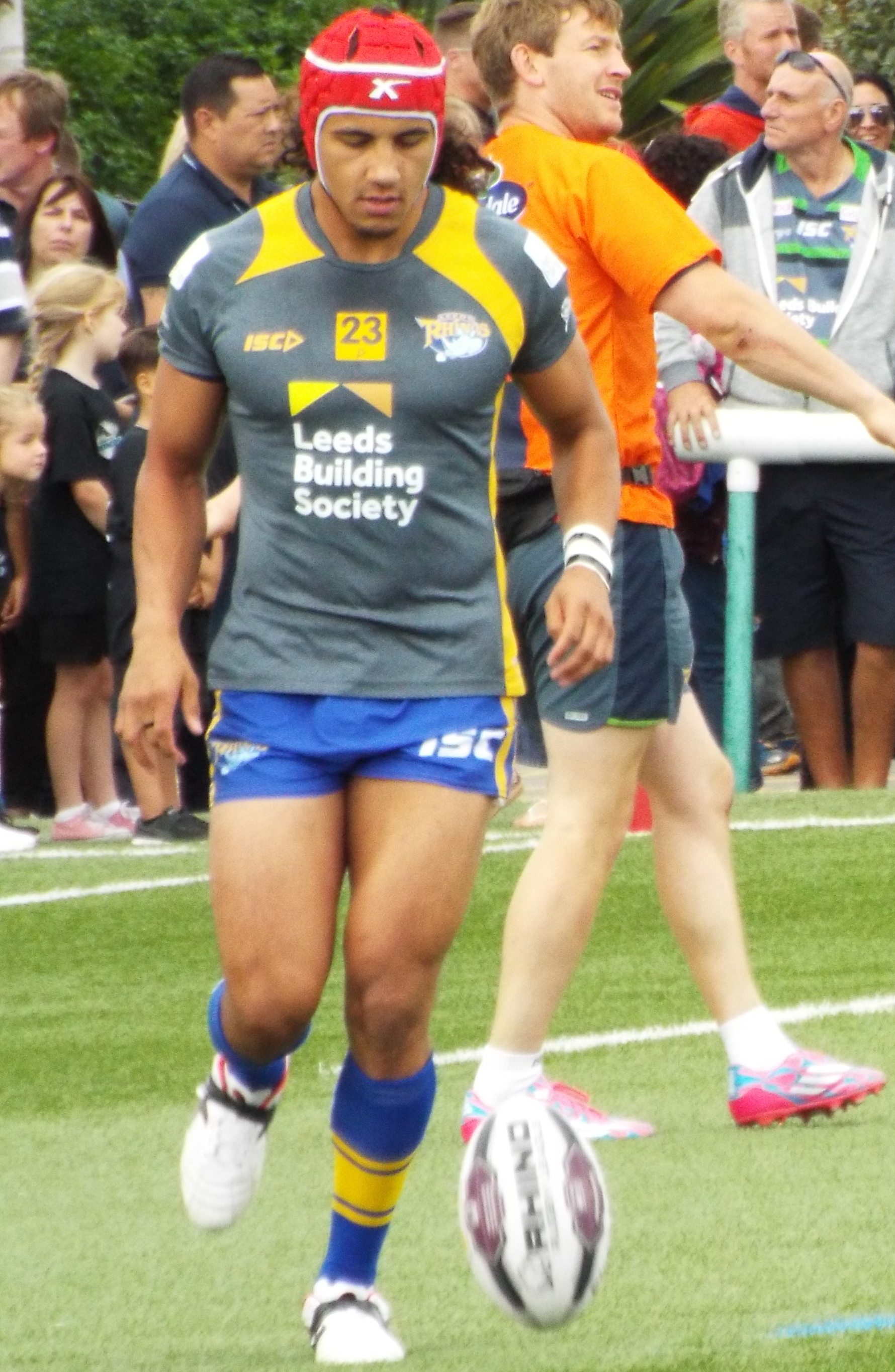

Personal information
- Full name: Ashton Nathaniel Graham Golding
- Born: 4 September 1996 (age 30) Bramley, Leeds, West Yorkshire, England
- Height: 5 ft 10 in (1.78 m)
- Weight: 14 st 5 lb (91 kg)

Playing information
- Position: Loose forward, Hooker, Fullback, Wing
Club
Years	Team	Pld	T	G	FG	P
2014–19	Leeds Rhinos	63	14	14	0	84
2016(loan)	→ Featherstone Rovers	3	2	0	0	8
2019(loan)	→ Featherstone Rovers	22	7	0	0	28
2020–25	Huddersfield Giants	102	10	0	0	40
2021(loan)	→ Bradford Bulls	2	1	0	0	4
2026–	Castleford Tigers	13	4	0	0	16
	Total	205	38	14	0	180
Representative
Years	Team	Pld	T	G	FG	P
2017–	Jamaica	8	2	0	0	8
- Source: As of 24 July 2026

Ashton Golding (born 4 September 1996) is a Jamaica international rugby league footballer who plays as a utility for the Castleford Tigers in the Super League.

Golding began his career with the Leeds Rhinos, where he had progressed through the academy. He spent six years in the Super League with Leeds, during which time he also played for Featherstone Rovers in the Championship on loan. Golding joined the Huddersfield Giants in 2020, where he would go on to make over 100 appearances and feature in the 2022 Challenge Cup final. His stay also included a short loan spell at Bradford Bulls in the Championship. He signed for the Castleford Tigers in 2026.

Described as a utility player, Golding has played in several positions during his career, most recently being utilised primarily as a loose forward or hooker. He has also operated as a fullback, winger or second-row, as well as deputising at stand-off and centre.

== Background ==
Golding was born in Bramley, Leeds, West Yorkshire, England. He grew up in Stanningley, West Yorkshire, and is of Jamaican descent.

He attended Priesthorpe School and studied sports science at Leeds Beckett University.

Golding played junior rugby league for amateur club Stanningley SARLFC before joining the Leeds Rhinos academy system. In 2014, he was named under-19s player of the season.

== Club career ==
=== Leeds Rhinos ===
Golding made his Super League debut for Leeds in August 2014, brought on as an interchange against London Broncos. In October 2014, he signed a four-year deal with Leeds.

In March 2015, Golding made his first Super League start against Warrington with first-choice fullback Zak Hardaker dropped. He was drafted into the team on three further occasions in the 2015 season.

Golding was included in Brian McDermott's 25-man senior squad for 2016. He was understudy to the transfer-listed Hardaker at fullback, though registered most of his starts on the wing. He made thirteen appearances and scored three tries for Leeds, as well as playing on dual registration at Featherstone in the Championship.

At the start of the 2017 season, Golding was assigned Leeds' number 1 jersey. He earned praise for an outstanding defensive performance against St Helens in round 1. He signed a new five-year contract in May having established himself as the Rhinos' first-choice fullback, though by the end of the season he had been displaced by Jack Walker and missed out on Grand Final selection.

=== Huddersfield Giants ===
In 2020, Golding signed for Huddersfield Giants.

On 26 May 2021, it was reported that he had signed for Bradford in the RFL Championship on loan.

On 28 May 2022, Golding played for Huddersfield in their 2022 Challenge Cup final loss to Wigan.

Golding was limited to only eight matches with Huddersfield in the 2023 Super League season as the club finished ninth on the table and missed the playoffs.

Golding played 19 games for Huddersfield in the 2024 Super League season which saw the club finish 9th on the table.

Golding played 27 games for Huddersfield in the 2025 Super League season as the club finished 10th on the table.

On 16 November 2025, Golding departed Huddersfield by mutual consent.

=== Castleford Tigers ===
On 18 February 2026, Castleford Tigers announced the signing of Golding on a deal until the end of the 2026 season. Though his signing was announced shortly following a long-term injury to fullback Blake Taaffe, Tigers head coach Ryan Carr – whom Golding had previously played under at Featherstone – confirmed he was brought in to cover several positions across the forwards and backs. He made his debut in round 3 against former team Huddersfield, crossing for a late try from dummy-half to seal victory. He scored his second try against St Helens in the cup, deputising as a centre and winger following injuries to teammates. After missing six matches due to a calf strain in March and April, Golding returned to the team and settled into the role of starting hooker. He scored tries in Castleford's home wins against St Helens in round 12 and Leeds in round 19. In round 20, he suffered a hamstring injury which brought his season to a premature end.

In October 2026, it was announced that Golding had signed a two-year contract extension with Castleford.

== International career ==
Golding played for England Academy in 2014 and was named man-of-the-match in their win against the Australian Schoolboys.

On 12 October 2017, Golding was named in Jamaica's squad to take on France in a World Cup warm-up game. He scored a try on debut as Jamaica fell to a 34–12 defeat at Stade Gilbert Brutus.

Golding was one of two Super League players to be selected in Jamaica's 29-man squad for the 2018 Americas Rugby League Championship held at Hodges Stadium in Jacksonville, Florida. He scored a try in their semi-final win against Canada and was named man-of-the-match in their 10–16 victory over the United States in the final. This marked Jamaica's first ever win against the USA and secured qualification to the 2021 Rugby League World Cup.

In October 2019, he featured at fullback for Jamaica against the England Knights at Headingley Rugby Stadium.

On 15 October 2021, Golding played for Jamaica against the England Knights at Wheldon Road. The following week, he played in Jamaica's 30–30 draw with Scotland at Post Office Road.

In October 2022, Golding was appointed captain of the Jamaica national team ahead of the 2021 World Cup, their maiden tournament. He played in a warm-up match against Cumbria. He was assigned the number 13 shirt and played in all three matches of the campaign, against Ireland, New Zealand and Lebanon, as Jamaica exited at the group stage.

On 25 October 2025, Golding captained Jamaica in their 2026 World Cup qualifying play-off against France. They were defeated 36–0 at Stade Municipal d'Albi and were unable to secure a place at a second consecutive World Cup.

== Statistics ==
Appearances and points in all competitions by year
Club	Season	Tier	App	T	G	DG	Pts
Leeds Rhinos	2014	Super League	1	0	0	0	0
Leeds Rhinos	2015	Super League	4	0	0	0	0
Leeds Rhinos	2016	Super League	13	3	0	0	12
Leeds Rhinos	2017	Super League	22	3	14	0	40
Leeds Rhinos	2018	Super League	22	6	0	0	24
Leeds Rhinos	2019	Super League	1	2	0	0	8
Leeds Rhinos	Total		63	14	14	0	84
→ Featherstone Rovers (loan)	2016	Championship	3	2	0	0	8
→ Featherstone Rovers (loan)	2019	Championship	22	7	0	0	28
→ Featherstone Rovers (loan)	Total		25	9	0	0	36
Huddersfield Giants	2020	Super League	11	2	0	0	8
Huddersfield Giants	2021	Super League	10	1	0	0	4
Huddersfield Giants	2022	Super League	22	2	0	0	8
Huddersfield Giants	2023	Super League	8	3	0	0	12
Huddersfield Giants	2024	Super League	22	1	0	0	4
Huddersfield Giants	2025	Super League	29	1	0	0	4
Huddersfield Giants	Total		102	10	0	0	40
→ Bradford Bulls (loan)	2021	Championship	2	1	0	0	4
Castleford Tigers	2026	Super League	13	4	0	0	16
Career total			205	38	14	0	180

As of match played 24 July 2026
