= Co-op Academy Priesthorpe =

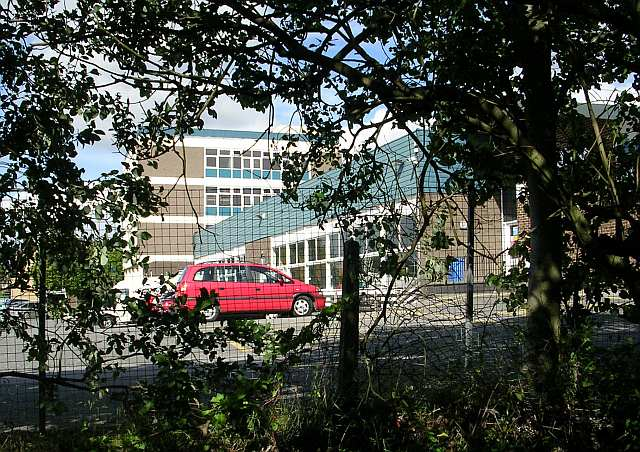
- The academy seen from Priesthorpe Lane

Location
- Priesthorpe Lane; Farsley; Pudsey, West Yorkshire, LS28 5SG; England
- Coordinates: 53°48′36″N 1°41′12″W

Information
- Type: Academy
- Motto: Ready. Respectful. Safe.
- Local authority: City of Leeds
- Department for Education URN: 144588 Tables
- Ofsted: Reports
- Chair: I Featherstone
- Principal: Louis Pratt
- Age: 11 to 16
- Enrolment: 1,039
- Colours: Black, Grey & Blue
- Website: http://www.priesthorpe.leeds.sch.uk/

Co-op Academy Priesthorpe is a secondary school, academy and sixth form in Pudsey, West Yorkshire, England.

== Curriculum ==
Co-op Academy Priesthorpe conforms to the common English school curriculum pattern of Key Stages. It follows the statutory requirements of National Curriculum core subjects, with the additional subjects of religious education, business studies, media studies, history, sociology, catering, hospitality, health & social care, and performing arts.

== Performance ==
The Office for Standards in Education rated the school Grade 2 (Good) in November 2012. This grade was due to the numerous successes and achievements by the staff and former head teacher Ken Hall, who after implementing numerous innovations, left the school in July 2012 and officially September 2012. To this day, there is around 1091, with a capacity of 1140

The school has received the Investors in People award and the Inclusion Chartermark, which it maintained from previous years.

Office for Standards in Education later in January 2017 rated the school as Requires Improvement. This grade was due to the effectiveness of leadership & management, quality of teaching/learning and outcomes for pupils.

Office for Standards in Education rated the academy as Requires Improvement in March 2020. The grade was due to the quality of education, behaviour and attitudes, leadership and management and sixth-form provision

== Notable people ==
=== Alumni ===
- Jamie Jones-Buchanan, rugby league coach and former professional player
- Harpal Singh, former footballer
- Ashton Golding, professional rugby league player with the Huddersfield Giants
- Sam Hallas, rugby league player with the Bradford Bulls

=== Faculty ===
- Peter Solowka, guitarist for The Ukrainians and formerly The Wedding Present
