= Adam O'Brien =

English rugby league footballer (born 1993)

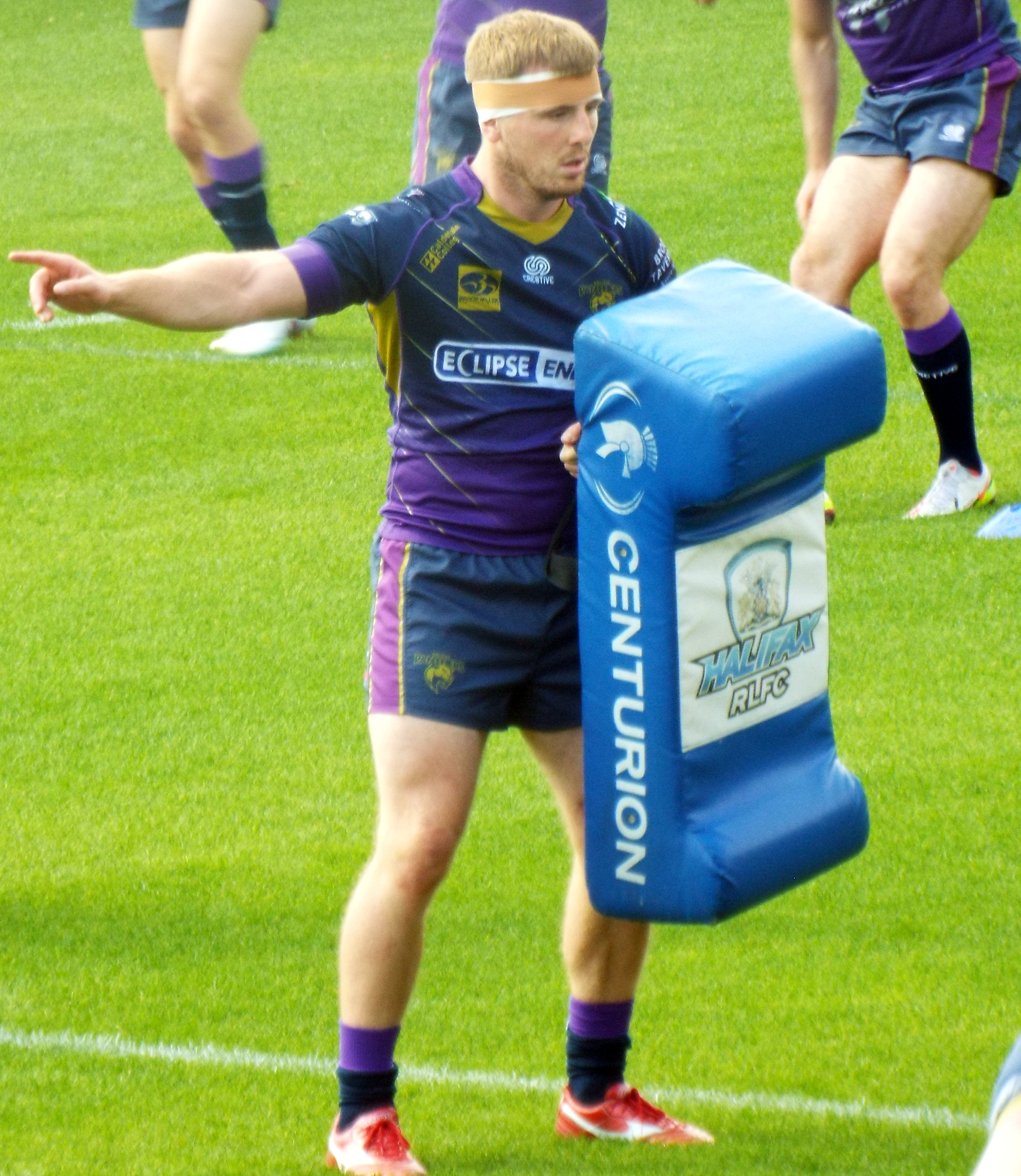

Personal information
- Born: 11 July 1993 (age 33) Halifax, West Yorkshire, England
- Height: 5 ft 10 in (1.78 m)
- Weight: 14 st 3 lb (90 kg)

Playing information
- Position: Hooker
Club
Years	Team	Pld	T	G	FG	P
2011–16	Bradford Bulls	109	25	0	0	100
2013(loan)	→ Dewsbury Rams	17	7	0	0	28
2017–23	Huddersfield Giants	120	20	0	0	80
2017(loan)	→ Halifax	2	1	0	0	4
2023(loan)–	→ Halifax Panthers	13	1	0	0	4
2024–	Halifax Panthers	69	6	0	0	24
	Total	330	60	0	0	240
- Source: As of 3 November 2026

Adam O'Brien (born 11 July 1993) is an English professional rugby league footballer who plays as a hooker for Halifax Panthers in the Championship.

He has previously played for the Huddersfield Giants and Bradford Bulls in the Super League and the Championship, spending time away from Odsal with the Dewsbury Rams in 2013. In 2017 he was sent on loan from Huddersfield to Halifax in the Championship.

== Background ==
O'Brien was born in Halifax, West Yorkshire, England.

Playing for King Cross Park RLFC a Halifax based community club as a junior which he is still heavily involved in has the Head Coach. He joined Bradford Junior Development system and was called up to the England Knights in 2019 along with 3 other Giants players.

== Playing career ==
=== Bradford Bulls ===
O'Brien featured in the pre-season game against Dewsbury. O'Brien was not selected in any league or cup matches this season. At the end of the 2010 season he was given a three-year professional contract.

O'Brien featured in three of the four pre-season friendlies. He played against Halifax, Dewsbury and the Keighley Cougars. O'Brien made his Super League début against Huddersfield, however he was not selected until later against Hull Kingston Rovers and played until the match against the Wakefield Trinity Wildcats. He did feature in the Challenge Cup game against Halifax.

O'Brien featured in three of the four pre-season friendlies. He played against Castleford, Dewsbury and Hull F.C. O'Brien featured in Round 19 (Wigan) to Round 21 (Leeds). He signed a five-year extension to his contract midway through the season.

O'Brien featured in the pre-season friendlies against Dewsbury and Leeds. He featured in Round 5 against Huddersfield and then in Round 7 against Hull Kingston Rovers. O'Brien also featured in Round 10 against Salford and Round 17 against Hull Kingston Rovers. His next appearance was in Round 25 against Castleford to Round 27 Huddersfield. O'Brien featured in the Challenge Cup against the Rochdale Hornets.

O'Brien featured in the pre-season games against Hull F.C. and Castleford.

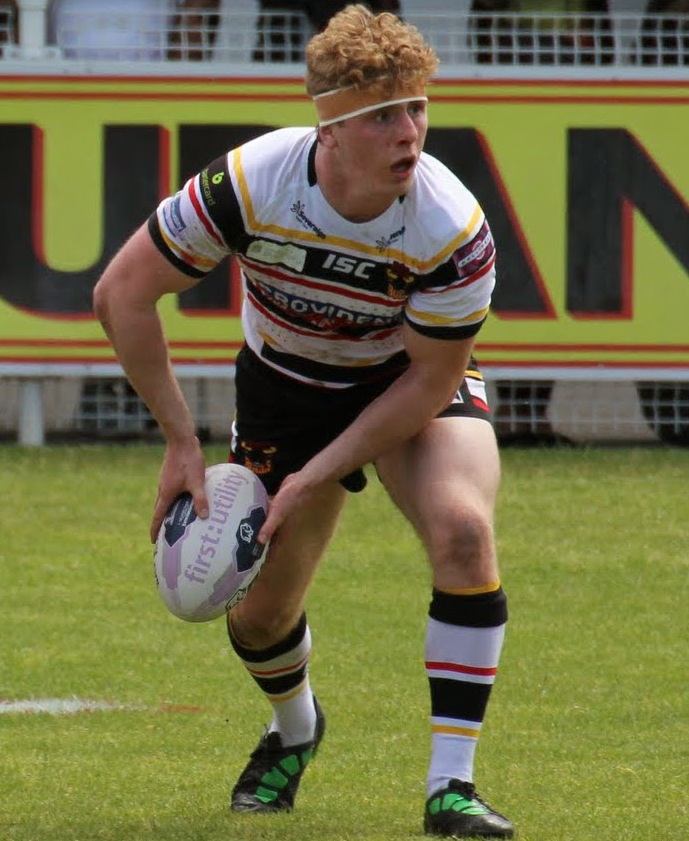
O'Brien playing for the Bradford Bulls in 2014

He featured in Round 1 Castleford to Round 14 Catalans Dragons then in Round 16 against Salford to Round 27 London Broncos. O'Brien featured in Round 4 (Oldham) to the Quarter Final against Warrington in the Challenge Cup.

O'Brien re-signed with Bradford for another two years despite their relegation to the Championship for the 2015 season.

O'Brien featured in the pre-season friendlies against Castleford and Leeds. He featured in Round 1 Leigh to Round 23 (Halifax). O'Brien played in Qualifier 1 against the Sheffield Eagles to Qualifier 6 (Leigh Centurions). O'Brien played in the £1 Million Game against Wakefield Trinity. He also featured in the Challenge Cup in Round 4 Workington Town to Round 5 Hull Kingston Rovers. At the end of the 2015 season O'Brien won the T&A player of the year, the Bradford members player of the year and Bradford Players' player of the year.

O'Brien featured in both pre-season friendlies against Leeds and Castleford. He featured in Round 1 Featherstone Rovers to Round 22 Oldham. Adam played in the Championship Shield Game 1 Whitehaven to the Final Sheffield Eagles. Midway through the season O'Brien signed a contract extension keeping him at the club until the end of 2019.

=== Dewsbury Rams ===
O'Brien was dual registered with Dewsbury for the 2013 season. He featured against Doncaster, Featherstone Rovers, Hunslet (two spells), Whitehaven (two spells), York City Knights (two spells), Workington Town (two spells), Sheffield Eagles (two spells), Keighley (two spells), Halifax (two spells) and Swinton. He scored against Doncaster (2 tries), York City Knights (2 tries), Swinton (1 try), Sheffield Eagles (1 try) and Halifax (1 try).

=== Huddersfield Giants ===
Following Bradford's liquidation prior to the 2017 season, O'Brien signed a three-year deal following teammate Alex Mellor to Huddersfield in the Super League. In the 2018 Super League Season Adam O'Brien received the Huddersfield Giants Players Player of The Year Award. In January 2019, O'Brien signed a new three-year deal until the end of 2022.

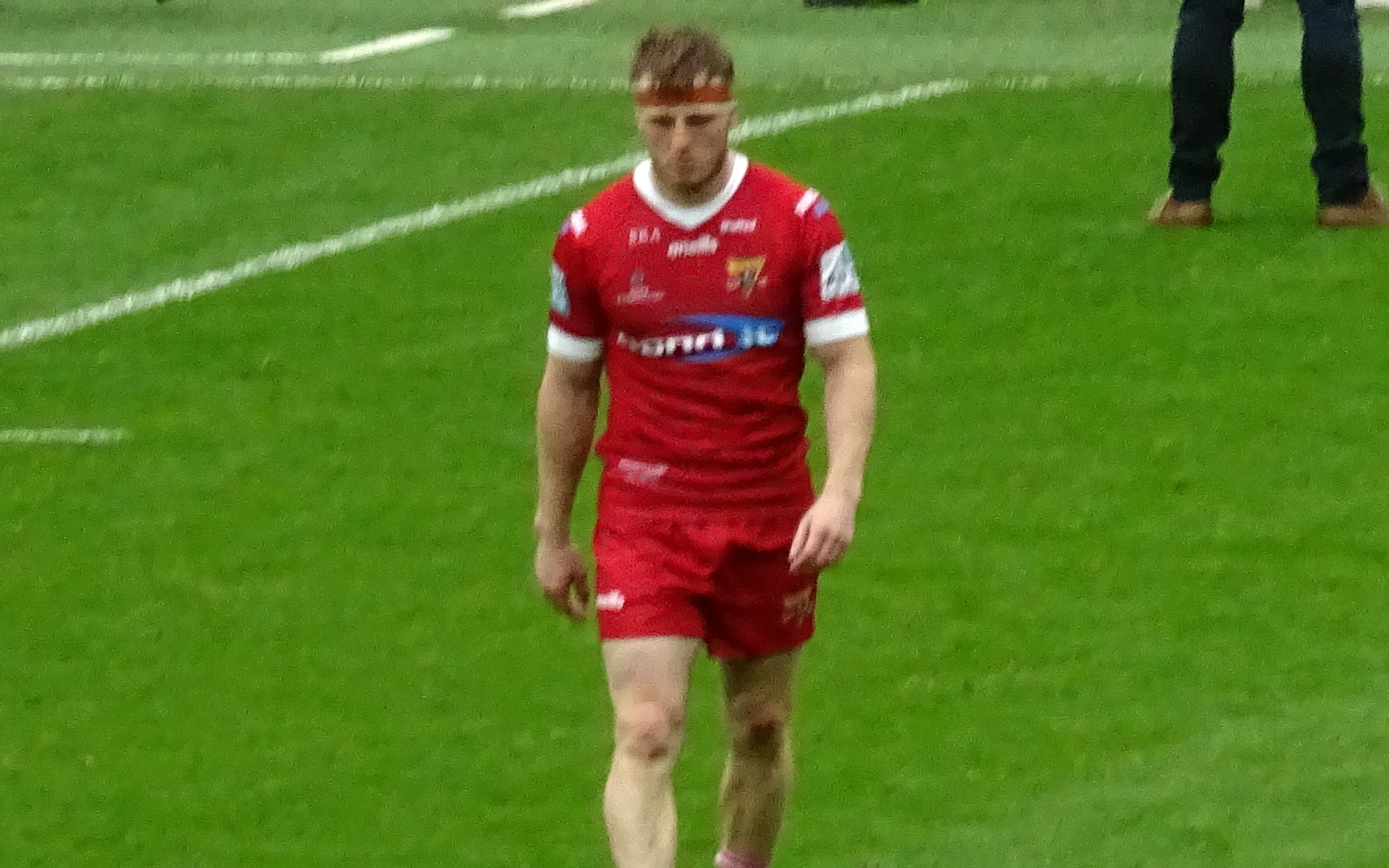
O'Brien playing for the Huddersfield Giants in 2019

=== Halifax Panthers ===
On 5 October 2023, it was reported that he had signed a 3 year permanent deal with his hometown club Halifax commencing the 2024 season.

== Statistics ==
Season	Appearance	Tries	Goals	F/G	Points
2011 Bradford	6	0	0	0	0
2012 Bradford	3	0	0	0	0
2013 Bradford	8	1	0	0	4
2013 Dewsbury-Loan	17	7	0	0	28
2014 Bradford	29	6	0	0	24
2015 Bradford	32	9	0	0	36
2016 Bradford	31	9	0	0	36
2017 Halifax-Loan	2	1	0	0	4
2017 Huddersfield	17	3	0	0	12
2018 Huddersfield	31	6	0	0	24
2019 Huddersfield	27	4	0	0	16
2020 Huddersfield	11	3	0	0	12
2021 Huddersfield	11	1	0	0	4
2022 Huddersfield	14	3	0	0	12
2023 Huddersfield	9	0	0	0	0
2023 Halifax-Loan	13	1	0	0	4
2024 Halifax	17	1	0	0	4
2025 Halifax	29	4	0	0	16
2026 Halifax	23	1	0	0	4
2027 Halifax	0	0	0	0	0
Total	330	60	0	0	240

== Senior international career ==
=== England Academy ===
O'Brien appeared as an interchange in a victory against France U18 in June 2010 and in both tests against the Australian Schoolboys in December 2010, England Academy won the series 2–0 with both games being played at Leigh Sports Village.

O'Brien is the younger brother of the former footballer, Luke O'Brien.
