= 2020 Super League season =

European rugby league season

Super League XXV
- League: Super League
- Duration: 20 rounds (reduced from 29)
- Teams: 11 (reduced from 12)
- Matches played: 94
- Points scored: 7,574
- Highest attendance: 19,599; Hull FC Vs Hull KR (7 February)
- Lowest attendance: 3,350; Salford Red Devils Vs Huddersfield Giants (14 February) (Excludes games behind closed doors)
- Average attendance: 4,171 (Note: Does not include games played behind closed doors.)
- Total attendance: 300,339;
- Broadcast partners: Sky Sports; BBC Sport; Fox League; Fox Soccer Plus; Sport Klub

2020 season
- Champions: St Helens; 8th Super League title 15th British title
- League Leaders Shield: Wigan Warriors
- Runners-up: Wigan Warriors
- Biggest home win: Wigan Warriors (Note: Although this game was played at a neutral venue, Wigan were the designated home team for the match.) 58–12 Salford Red Devils (23 October); St Helens 48–2 Catalans Dragons (20 November)
- Biggest away win: Wakefield Trinity 0–58 Catalans Dragons (15 August)
- Man of Steel: (England) Paul McShane
- Top point-scorer: (Scotland) Lachlan Coote (152)
- Top try-scorer: (England) Ash Handley (15)

Left League
- Toronto Wolfpack

Super League XXV, known as the 2020 Betfred Super League for sponsorship reasons, was the 25th season of the Super League and 126th season of rugby league in Great Britain. St Helens were the reigning champions going into Super League XXV.

At the start of the season, the competition consisted of twelve teams: ten from England, one from Canada, and one from France. Due to financial pressures related to the season suspension, Canadian side Toronto Wolfpack withdrew from the league in July 2020, and the league continued with just 11 teams.

The league was suspended on 16 March, due to the COVID-19 pandemic, but a resumption to a revised format started again on 2 August. Among the changes were the cancellation of the annual Magic Weekend, which was scheduled to be played at St James' Park, Newcastle. The Grand Final was scheduled to be held at Old Trafford, Manchester, but the venue became unavailable in October due to host club Manchester United's Champions League fixtures. On 22 October, it was announced that the Grand Final would now be played at Hull F.C.'s KCOM Stadium.

== Effects of the COVID-19 pandemic ==
=== Fixture postponement ===
On 16 March 2020, the RFL announced that all rugby league games had been suspended initially, until at least April, due to the COVID-19 outbreak. However, on 24 March, Super League clubs held a Board meeting via conference call, attended in part by senior officials of the Rugby Football League, for further discussion of how to respond to the current public health crisis. It was agreed that until further notice, all rugby league fixtures will be suspended indefinitely.

On 21 April, the RFL announced that the Magic Weekend fixtures scheduled to take place at St James' Park had been postponed due to the current lockdown situation.

=== Season resumption ===
On 26 June 2020, it was announced that the competition will resume on Sunday 2 August 2020, with two games outstanding from rounds 2–7 to be played at a single venue.

The results of matches played before the suspension will count towards the league table and 15 rounds are planned post-resumption. At the end of the season the top four teams will compete in two semi-finals with the winners meeting in the Super League Grand Final. This has a provisional date at the end of November 2020.

The revised fixture list was published on 16 July, with the opening fixtures played on 2 August and then the all six round 8 games to be played at Headingley, Leeds on 8 and 9 August. On the same day, Toronto announced that all the club's games for the remainder of the season would be played in England.

=== Super League and Sky Sports agree on 2020 rights fees ===
On 22 June, it was announced that The RFL and Sky Sports had reached agreement over clubs' 2020 TV revenues, which recognises the huge disruption to this season's fixture calendar, and the significant impact it has had on broadcasting schedules. The agreement is subject to the sport resuming when government and public health advice allows.

=== Toronto Wolfpack withdrawal ===
On 1 April 2020, Toronto Wolfpack issued a statement regarding their first three fixtures scheduled to be played at Lamport Stadium in Canada. Due to the suspension of rugby league, and the coronavirus pandemic events, the decision to confirm these postponements had been taken, following regular consultation with the Wolfpack, and given the specific issues around international travel to and from Canada.

On 20 July, the club announced that they would be taking no further part in the restarted season, citing the "financial challenges" the club would be facing, including loss of gate money, medical testing and the hire of grounds in England, but that the club hoped that they would be competing in Super League in 2021. The RFL and Super League issued a statement in response to the announcement, which said that both bodies were "very disappointed" by Toronto's decision, and that discussions about Toronto's future involvement in Super League would have to be held.

It was later announced that Toronto's results were to be expunged, although individual player's records would not be affected, however any Man of Steel points earned in the matches against Toronto would be erased.

On 3 August 2020, The RFL issued a further statement regarding Toronto, stating that they had terminated their contract for the remainder of 2020 season.

=== Competition format ===
Although matches recommenced in August and the number of games was reduced from 29 to 22, a number of games were postponed due to positive COVID-19 tests among players and staff of the clubs. In response the RFL took the decision on 9 September to change the way league positions were determined. For the first time since the 1944–45 wartime emergency season league position was determined by win percentage (number of wins divided by number of games played) rather than by competition points, acknowledging that some clubs were unlikely to fulfil all their fixtures. The change was introduced immediately. The top four clubs would still qualify for the play-offs but must have played at least 15 games in order to participate in the play-offs. During a meeting of Super League clubs at the beginning of November, Hull Kingston Rovers announced that due to the number of their squad affected by COVID-19 the club could not fulfil its remaining fixtures. The clubs therefore agreed to end the regular season after round 20 and extend the play-offs to include the top six clubs (rather than just the top four) as of 6 November. The clubs and the RFL also agreed to remove the requirement that teams had to have played a minimum of 15 matches to qualify for the play-offs.

== Teams ==
Locations of Super League XXV teams
Locations of Super League XXV teams

The season featured eleven of the twelve teams that participated in Super League XXIV. London Broncos were relegated after finishing bottom of Super League XXIV. They were replaced by the 2019 RFL Championship winners Toronto Wolfpack, who played in Super League for the first time since being founded in 2017. Due to their home ground Lamport Stadium being unavailable during the Canadian winter, Toronto were to play their first ten games in England, after initial plans fell through to play three home games in European cities such as Dublin, Republic of Ireland or Barcelona, Spain.

The traditional two matches played on Good Friday and Easter Monday were to have been reduced to only one over the Easter weekend due to concerns over player welfare.

A change to the rules saw clubs able to name a squad of 21 players two days prior to match days rather than 19 in previous seasons. However, should a club add a player to the announced squad, they would lose one of their eight interchanges for the match in question (players on dual registration deals with lower league clubs are exempt).

Legend
| Reigning Champions |
| Previous season League Leaders |
| Promoted |

| Team | 2019 position | Stadium | Capacity | City/Area |
|---|---|---|---|---|
| Castleford Tigers (2020 season) | 5th | The Mend-A-Hose Jungle | 12,000 | Castleford, West Yorkshire |
| Catalans Dragons (2020 season) | 7th | Stade Gilbert Brutus | 13,000 | Perpignan, Pyrénées-Orientales, France |
| Huddersfield Giants (2020 season) | 10th | John Smith's Stadium | 24,121 | Huddersfield, West Yorkshire |
| Hull (2020 season) | 6th | KCOM Stadium | 25,400 | Kingston upon Hull, East Riding of Yorkshire |
| Hull Kingston Rovers (2020 season) | 11th | Lightstream Stadium | 12,225 | Kingston upon Hull, East Riding of Yorkshire |
| Leeds Rhinos (2020 season) | 8th | Headingley | 21,062 | Leeds, West Yorkshire |
| Salford Red Devils (2020 season) | 3rd (Runners up) | AJ Bell Stadium | 12,000 | Salford, Greater Manchester |
| St. Helens (2020 season) | 1st (League leaders & champions) | Totally Wicked Stadium | 18,000 | St. Helens, Merseyside |
| Wakefield Trinity (2020 season) | 9th | Beaumont Legal Stadium | 9,333 | Wakefield, West Yorkshire |
| Warrington Wolves (2020 season) | 4th | Halliwell Jones Stadium | 15,200 | Warrington, Cheshire |
| Wigan Warriors (2020 season) | 2nd | DW Stadium | 25,133 | Wigan, Greater Manchester |

== Rule changes ==
Both golden point extra time and the shot clock, introduced in 2019, were retained for 2020 although the shot clock timings were reduced by 5 seconds each with only 30 seconds available for the forming of scrums and 25 seconds for the taking of a goal line drop out.

As part of the work to restart the season, two major rule changes were made in July 2020 to apply for the rest of the season. Scrums were removed from the game and were replaced by a play-the-ball and an Australian innovation "six again" was adopted which replaces penalties for defensive infringements at rucks with a new set of six for the attacking team.

== Results ==
=== Extra time ===
==== Game 1 (Wakefield v Hull FC) ====
The first game to go to golden-point was the round 6 game between Wakefield and Hull F.C. on 6 March 2020. Hull won the match 27–26, thanks to a Marc Sneyd drop goal, after the scores were tied at 26-all after 80 minutes.

==== Game 2 (Huddersfield Giants v Leeds Rhinos) ====
The second game to go to golden-point was the rearranged round 2 game between Huddersfield Giants and Leeds Rhinos on 2 August 2020. Leeds won the match 27–26, thanks to a Luke Gale drop goal, after the scores were tied at 26-all after 80 minutes.

==== Game 3 (St Helens v Hull KR) ====
The Third game to go to golden-point was the round 12 game between St Helens and Hull KR on 11 September 2020. St Helens won the match 21–20, thanks to a Theo Fages drop goal, after the scores were tied at 20-20 after 80 minutes.

=== Forfeiture ===
Round 19 saw the first occasion of a game being forfeited. Salford were due to play Warrington on 30 October but on 28 October Salford announced that the club was unable to complete the fixture due to being unable to raise a team and that they would therefore to forfeit the game. Under the RFL operational rules the game was awarded to Warrington as a 24–0 win.

== Regular season table ==
| Pos | Team | Pld | W | D | L | PF | PA | PP | Pts | PCT | Qualification (Note: Where teams have the same win percentage, position is decided by points scored percentage (points scored divided by points conceded).) |
|---|---|---|---|---|---|---|---|---|---|---|---|
| 1 | Wigan Warriors (L) | 17 | 13 | 0 | 4 | 408 | 278 | 146.8 | 26 | 76.47 | Semi-finals |
| 2 | St Helens (C) | 17 | 12 | 0 | 5 | 469 | 195 | 240.5 | 24 | 70.59 | Semi-finals |
| 3 | Warrington Wolves (Note: Salford forfeited a game against Warrington. Under RFL operational rules, the game is recorded as a 24–0 victory for Warrington and converse loss for Salford with the points scored/conceded applying to both teams.) | 17 | 12 | 0 | 5 | 365 | 204 | 178.9 | 24 | 70.59 | Elimination semi-finals |
| 4 | Catalans Dragons | 13 | 8 | 0 | 5 | 376 | 259 | 145.2 | 16 | 61.54 | Elimination semi-finals |
| 5 | Leeds Rhinos | 17 | 10 | 0 | 7 | 369 | 390 | 94.6 | 20 | 58.82 | Elimination semi-finals |
| 6 | Hull F.C. | 17 | 9 | 0 | 8 | 405 | 436 | 92.9 | 18 | 52.94 | Elimination semi-finals |
| 7 | Huddersfield Giants (Note: Huddersfield were placed on standby to take the place of any of the four teams in the elimination finals should one be unable to fulfil their fixture.) | 18 | 7 | 0 | 11 | 318 | 367 | 86.6 | 14 | 38.89 | |
| 8 | Castleford Tigers | 16 | 6 | 0 | 10 | 328 | 379 | 86.5 | 12 | 37.50 | |
| 9 | Salford Red Devils | 18 | 8 | 0 | 10 | 354 | 469 | 75.5 | 10 (Note: Salford deducted 3 wins by the Rugby Football League for failing to meet the terms of a financial commitment agreed in 2013.) | 27.78 | |
| 10 | Wakefield Trinity | 19 | 5 | 0 | 14 | 324 | 503 | 64.4 | 10 | 26.32 | |
| 11 | Hull Kingston Rovers | 17 | 3 | 0 | 14 | 290 | 526 | 55.1 | 6 | 17.65 | |

Source: BBC Sport
Rules for classification: 1) Points; 2) Points difference; 3) Number of points scored;
(C) Champions; (L) League Leaders' Shield Winners

== Play-offs ==
The play-off format was varied twice during the year. Originally planned to use the same top-five team competition as had been used in 2019, the reactions to the COVID-19 situation meant firstly in September, a change to a top-four straight knock-out system and then in October a subsequent change to a top-six system.

Wigan and St Helens (who finished first and second respectively in the regular season table) had byes to the semi-finals, whilst the four teams who finished third to sixth (Warrington Catalans, Leeds, Hull FC) contested in two elimination finals, with the winner of those two games, Hull playing Wigan, and Catalans playing St Helens.

Despite being defeated in the elimination finals, Warrington and Leeds were retained on standby, should any of the four teams in the semi-finals, be unable to fulfil their fixture. On 17 November they were both officially stood down, when all the COVID tests for the semi-finalists came back negative. The highest ranked losing team from the semi-finals (Catalans), remained on standby to compete in the grand final, if either finalists were unable to do so.

Elimination play-offs
3 | Warrington Wolves | 14
6 | Hull FC | 27
4 | Catalans Dragons | 26
5 | Leeds Rhinos | 14

Semi-finals
1 | Wigan Warriors | 29
6 | Hull FC | 2
2 | St Helens | 48
4 | Catalans Dragons | 2

Grand final
1 | Wigan Warriors | 4
2 | St Helens | 8

=== Week 1: Elimination play-offs ===
| Home | Score | Away | Match Information |
| Home | Score | Away | Date and Time | Venue | Referee |
Elimination final 1
| Warrington Wolves | 14–27 | Hull FC | 12 November 2020, 19:45 | Halliwell Jones Stadium | Liam Moore |
Elimination final 2
| Catalans Dragons | 26–14 | Leeds Rhinos | 13 November 2020, 19:45 | Halliwell Jones Stadium | Chris Kendall |

=== Week 2: Semi-finals ===
| Home | Score | Away | Match Information |
| Home | Score | Away | Date and Time | Venue | Referee |
Semi-final 1
| Wigan Warriors | 29–2 | Hull FC | 19 November 2020, 19:45 | DW Stadium | Chris Kendall |
Semi-final 2
| St Helens | 48–2 | Catalans Dragons | 20 November 2020, 19:45 | Totally Wicked Stadium | Liam Moore |

=== Week 3: Grand final ===
| Home | Score | Away | Match Information |
| Home | Score | Away | Date and Time | Venue | Referee |
|---|---|---|---|---|---|
| Wigan Warriors | 4–8 | St Helens | 27 November 2020, 20:00 | KCOM Stadium, Hull | Chris Kendall |

== Player statistics ==
=== Top 10 try scorers ===
| Rank | Player | Club | Tries |
|---|---|---|---|
| 1 | (England) Ash Handley | Leeds Rhinos | 14 |
| 2= | (England) Tom Davies | Catalans Dragons | 13 |
| 2= | (Australia) Bevan French | Wigan Warriors | 13 |
| 4= | (England) Ben Crooks | Hull KR | 11 |
| 4= | (England) Sam Powell | Wigan Warriors | 11 |
| 6= | (Wales) Regan Grace | St Helens | 10 |
| 6= | (England) Niall Evalds | Salford Red Devils | 10 |
| 6= | (New Zealand) Krisnan Inu | Salford Red Devils | 10 |
| 9= | (France) Fouad Yaha | Catalans Dragons | 9 |
| 9= | (England) Jermaine McGillvary | Huddersfield Giants | 9 |
| 9= | (England) Niall Evalds | Salford Red Devils | 9 |
| 9= | (England) Alex Walmsley | St Helens | 9 |
| 9= | (England) Tom Johnstone | Wakefield Trinity | 9 |
| 9= | (England) Matty Ashton | Warrington Wolves | 9 |
| 9= | (Australia) Jackson Hastings | Wigan Warriors | 9 |

=== Top 10 try assists ===
| Rank | Player | Club | Assists |
|---|---|---|---|
| 1 | (England) Jonny Lomax | St Helens | 21 |
| 2= | (Turkey) Aidan Sezer | Huddersfield Giants | 18 |
| 2= | (Australia) Jackson Hastings | Wigan Warriors | 18 |
| 4 | (England) Jake Connor | Hull FC | 16 |
| 5= | (Australia) Josh Drinkwater | Catalans Dragons | 14 |
| 5= | (England) Sam Tomkins | Catalans Dragons | 14 |
| 5= | (Scotland) Lachlan Coote | St Helens | 14 |
| 8 | (England) Danny Richardson | Castleford Tigers | 13 |
| 9 | (England) Luke Gale | Leeds Rhinos | 12 |
| 10 | (England) Toby King | Warrington Wolves | 11 |
| 10= | (England) Jordan Abdull | Hull KR | 10 |
| 10= | (England) Richie Myler | Leeds Rhinos | 10 |
| 10= | (Tonga) Tui Lolohea | Salford Red Devils | 10 |

=== Top 10 goal scorers ===
| Rank | Player | Club | Goals | Drop Goals |
|---|---|---|---|---|
| 1 | (England) Zak Hardaker | Wigan Warriors | 62/81 (76%) | 0 |
| 2 | (Australia) James Maloney | Catalans Dragons | 60/69 (80%) | 0 |
| 3 | (Scotland) Lachlan Coote | St Helens | 60/69 (87%) | 0 |
| 4 | (England) Marc Sneyd | Hull FC | 56/70 (80%) | 5 |
| 5 | (England) Danny Richardson | Castleford Tigers | 48/61 (78%) | 1 |
| 6 | (England) Stefan Ratchford | Warrington Wolves | 47/57 (82%) | 0 |
| 7 | (Turkey) Aidan Sezer | Huddersfield Giants | 38/50 (76%) | 1 |
| 8 | (Papua New Guinea) Rhyse Martin | Leeds Rhinos | 36/50 (72%) | 0 |
| 9 | (England) Ryan Hampshire | Wakefield Trinity | 33/44 (75%) | 0 |
| 10 | (New Zealand) Krisnan Inu | Salford Red Devils | 32/35 (91%) | 0 |

=== Top 10 points scorers ===
| Rank | Player | Club | Points |
|---|---|---|---|
| 1 | (Scotland) Lachlan Coote | St Helens | 152 |
| 2 | (England) Zak Hardaker | Wigan Warriors | 140 |
| 3 | (Australia) James Maloney | Catalans Dragons | 128 |
| 4 | (England) Marc Sneyd | Hull FC | 125 |
| 5= | (England) Danny Richardson | Castleford Tigers | 105 |
| 5= | (Turkey) Aidan Sezer | Huddersfield Giants | 105 |
| 7= | (New Zealand) Krisnan Inu | Salford Red Devils | 104 |
| 7= | (England) Stefan Ratchford | Warrington Wolves | 104 |
| 9 | (England) Ryan Hampshire | Wakefield Trinity | 79 |
| 10 | (Papua New Guinea) Rhyse Martin | Leeds Rhinos | 78 |

- Updated to match(es) played on 13 November 2020

== Discipline ==
Red Cards

| Rank | Player | Club | Red Cards |
|---|---|---|---|
| 1= | (England) Oliver Holmes | Castleford Tigers | 1 |
| 1= | (England) Chris Hill | Warrington Wolves | 1 |

Yellow Cards

| Rank | Player | Club | Yellow Cards |
|---|---|---|---|
| 1= | (Australia) James Maloney | Catalans Dragons | 2 |
| 1= | (Turkey) Aidan Sezer | Huddersfield Giants | 2 |
| 1= | (New Zealand) Shaun Kenny-Dowall | Hull KR | 2 |
| 1= | (Australia) Dan Sarginson | Salford Red Devils | 2 |
| 1= | (Australia) Ben Murdoch-Masila | Warrington Wolves | 2 |
| 1= | (England) Joe Greenwood | Wigan Warriors | 2 |
| 7= | (Samoa) Peter Matautia | Castleford Tigers | 1 |
| 7= | (England) Grant Millington | Castleford Tigers | 1 |
| 7= | (England) Derrell Olpherts | Castleford Tigers | 1 |
| 7= | (France) Benjamin Garcia | Catalans Dragons | 1 |
| 7= | (New Zealand) Sam Kasiano | Catalans Dragons | 1 |
| 7= | (England) Sam Tomkins | Catalans Dragons | 1 |
| 7= | (Australia) Kenny Edwards | Huddersfield Giants | 1 |
| 7= | (England) Matty English | Huddersfield Giants | 1 |
| 7= | (England) Josh Griffin | Hull FC | 1 |
| 7= | (Fiji) Ratu Naulago | Hull FC | 1 |
| 7= | (England) Connor Wynne | Hull FC | 1 |
| 7= | (Scotland) Ryan Brierley | Hull KR | 1 |
| 7= | (Australia) Matt Parcell | Hull KR | 1 |
| 7= | (Australia) Adam Quinlan | Hull KR | 1 |
| 7= | (England) Luke Gale | Leeds Rhinos | 1 |
| 7= | (England) Ash Handley | Leeds Rhinos | 1 |
| 7= | (England) Alex Mellor | Leeds Rhinos | 1 |
| 7= | (England) Richie Myler | Leeds Rhinos | 1 |
| 7= | (England) Kevin Brown | Salford Red Devils | 1 |
| 7= | (England) Lee Mossop | Salford Red Devils | 1 |
| 7= | (England) Kris Welham | Salford Red Devils | 1 |
| 7= | (England) Matty Lees | St Helens | 1 |
| 7= | (England) Jonny Lomax | St Helens | 1 |
| 7= | (England) Louie McCarthy-Scarsbrook | St Helens | 1 |
| 7= | (Fiji) Kevin Naiqama | St Helens | 1 |
| 7= | (England) Alex Walmsley | St Helens | 1 |
| 7= | (England) James Batchelor | Wakefield Trinity | 1 |
| 7= | (France) Romain Navarette | Wakefield Trinity | 1 |
| 7= | (Tonga) Sitaleki Akauola | Warrington Wolves | 1 |
| 7= | (Australia) Blake Austin | Warrington Wolves | 1 |
| 7= | (England) Mike Cooper | Warrington Wolves | 1 |
| 7= | (New Zealand) Anthony Gelling | Warrington Wolves | 1 |
| 7= | (England) Jake Mamo | Warrington Wolves | 1 |
| 7= | (England) Liam Farrell | Wigan Warriors | 1 |
| 7= | (England) Sam Halsall | Wigan Warriors | 1 |
| 7= | (Samoa) Willie Isa | Wigan Warriors | 1 |
| 7= | (England) Morgan Smithies | Wigan Warriors | 1 |

- Updated to match(es) played on 6 November 2020

== End-of-season awards ==
The Super League end of season awards were made on 23 November. The award winners were:

- Steve Prescott Man of Steel: (England) Paul McShane (Castleford Tigers)
- Coach of the year: (Papua New Guinea) Adrian Lam (Wigan Warriors)
- Top Tackler: (England) Michael Lawrence (Huddersfield Giants) with 749 tackles
- Metre-maker: (England) Ash Handley (Leeds Rhinos) with 2541 metres
- Top Try Scorer: (England) Ash Handley (Leeds Rhinos) scoring 14 tries
- Young player of the year: (England) Harry Newman (Leeds Rhinos)
- Spirit of Super League: (England) Rob Burrow (Leeds Rhinos) and (Samoa) Mose Masoe (Hull KR)

=== Steve Prescott Man of Steel award ===
Paul McShane was one of five candidates shortlisted for the award, the others being Aidan Sezer (Huddersfield Giants), Lachlan Coote (St Helens), Liam Farrell and Bevan French (both of Wigan Warriors).

== Attendances ==
Club attendances

| Club | Home Games | Total | Average | Highest | |
|---|---|---|---|---|---|
| Castleford Tigers | 4 | 23,318 | 5,829 | 8,848 | |
| Catalans Dragons | 6 | 40,044 | 6,674 | 8,886 | 5,000 |
| Huddersfield Giants | 3 | 6,574 | 2,191 | 6,574 | |
| Hull FC | 5 | 54,215 | 10,843 | 19,599 | |
| Hull KR | 3 | 23,306 | 7,768 | 8,492 | |
| Leeds Rhinos | 7 | 42,681 | 6,097 | 19,500 | |
| Salford Red Devils | 6 | 16,704 | 2,784 | 4,796 | |
| St Helens | 6 | 22,426 | 3,737 | 12,008 | |
| Wakefield Trinity | 4 | 10,725 | 2,681 | 5,528 | |
| Warrington Wolves | 5 | 21,790 | 4,358 | 12,562 | |
| Wigan Warriors | 3 | 38,556 | 12,852 | 15,040 | |

Top 10 attendances

| Rank | Home club | Away club | Stadium | Attendance |
|---|---|---|---|---|
| 1 | Hull FC | Hull KR | KCOM Stadium | 19,599 |
| 2 | Leeds Rhinos | Hull FC | Headingley | 19,500 |
| 3 | Wigan Warriors | Warrington Wolves | DW Stadium | 15,040 |
| 4 | Warrington Wolves | St Helens | Halliwell Jones Stadium | 12,562 |
| 5 | Hull FC | St Helens | KCOM Stadium | 12,399 |
| 6 | Leeds Rhinos | Warrington Wolves | Headingley | 12,124 |
| 7 | St Helens | Salford Red Devils | Totally Wicked Stadium | 12,008 |
| 8 | Wigan Warriors | Hull FC | DW Stadium | 12,005 |
| 9 | Hull FC | Catalans Dragons | KCOM Stadium | 12,003 |
| 10 | Wigan Warriors | Hull Kingston Rovers | DW Stadium | 11,511 |
