= Jon Luke Kirby =

English rugby league footballer

Jon-Luke Kirby
Personal information
- Full name: Jon Luke Kirby
- Born: 23 September 1998 (age 27) England

Playing information
- Position: Prop, Second-row
Club
| Years | Team | Pld | T | G | FG | P |
|---|---|---|---|---|---|---|
| 2019–22 | Huddersfield Giants | 3 | 0 | 0 | 0 | 0 |
| 2019(loan) | → Hunslet RLFC | 12 | 1 | 0 | 0 | 4 |
| 2019(loan) | → Halifax Panthers | 2 | 0 | 0 | 0 | 0 |
| 2021(loan) | → Dewsbury Rams | 1 | 0 | 0 | 0 | 0 |
| 2022(loan) | → Dewsbury Rams | 13 | 1 | 0 | 0 | 4 |
| 2023 | York Knights | 14 | 2 | 0 | 0 | 8 |
| 2023– | Midlands Hurricanes | 46 | 8 | 11 | 0 | 54 |
| | Total | 91 | 12 | 11 | 0 | 70 |
- Source: As of 23 September 2025

Jon Luke Kirby (born 23 September 1998) is a professional rugby league player who plays as a prop or second-row forward for the Midlands Hurricanes in the Betfred Championship.

He has spent time on loan from Huddersfield Giants at Hunslet in League 1, Halifax and Dewsbury Rams in the Championship.

In 2019 he made his Super League début for the Giants against Hull F.C.

On 11 November 2022 it was announced that Kirby had joined the York Knights.

As of 2026, he is currently captain of Midlands Hurricanes after coming through the Huddersfield Giants Academy system.
