= Olly Ashall-Bott =

English rugby league footballer

Personal information
- Full name: Oliver Ashall-Bott
- Born: 24 November 1997 (age 28) Widnes, Cheshire, England
- Height: 5 ft 9 in (1.75 m)
- Weight: 14 st 7 lb (92 kg)

Playing information
- Position: Fullback, Wing
Club
Years	Team	Pld	T	G	FG	P
2018–19	Widnes Vikings	15	4	0	0	16
2018(loan)	→ N Wales Crusaders	3	3	0	0	12
2020	London Broncos	1	0	0	0	0
2020(loan)	→ Salford Red Devils	3	1	0	0	4
2021–22	Huddersfield Giants	10	3	0	0	12
2021(loan)	→ Wakefield Trinity	2	1	0	0	4
2022–	Toulouse Olympique	89	56	0	0	224
	Total	123	68	0	0	272
- Source: As of 13 October 2026

Oliver Ashall-Bott (born 24 November 1997) is an English professional rugby league footballer who plays as a fullback or winger for Toulouse Olympique in the Super League.

He previously played for the Huddersfield Giants, Wakefield Trinity and Widnes Vikings in the Super League and the Championship, and on loan from Widnes at the North Wales Crusaders in League 1. Ashall-Bott also played for the London Broncos in the Championship and spent time away from the Broncos at the Salford Red Devils in the Super League. He spent time on loan from Huddersfield at Wakefield Trinity in Super League XXVI.

== Personal life ==
Ashall-Bott was born as Oliver Ashall in Widnes, Cheshire, England.

He was previously in a relationship with England and Bayern Munich footballer Georgia Stanway.

== Career ==
=== Widnes Vikings ===
He made his début for the Widnes Vikings against Castleford in 2018. He went on to play 6 more games scoring one try (Hull KR) and heading on loan to North Wales Crusaders scoring 3 tries in three games. He played 7 games in the 2019 championship season scoring once.

=== London Broncos ===
On 25 September 2019, it was announced that Ashall-Bott had joined the London Broncos.

On 25 September 2020, Ashall-Bott agreed a temporary loan deal with the Salford Red Devils.

=== Huddersfield Giants ===
On 25 January 2021, it was reported that he had signed for the Huddersfield Giants in the Super League.

=== Wakefield Trinity (loan) ===
On 26 April 2021, it was reported that he had signed for Wakefield Trinity in the Super League on a short-term two-week long loan.

=== Toulouse Olympique ===
In February 2022, it was announced that Ashall-Bott had signed for Toulouse Olympique. Ashall-Bott played 25 games for Toulouse in the 2022 Super League season as they finished last on the table and were relegated back to the RFL Championship. In the 2025 RFL Championship season, he scored 23 tries in 22 games as the club won the RFL Championship grand final defeating York 10-8.
