= Aidan Sezer =

Turkey international rugby league footballer

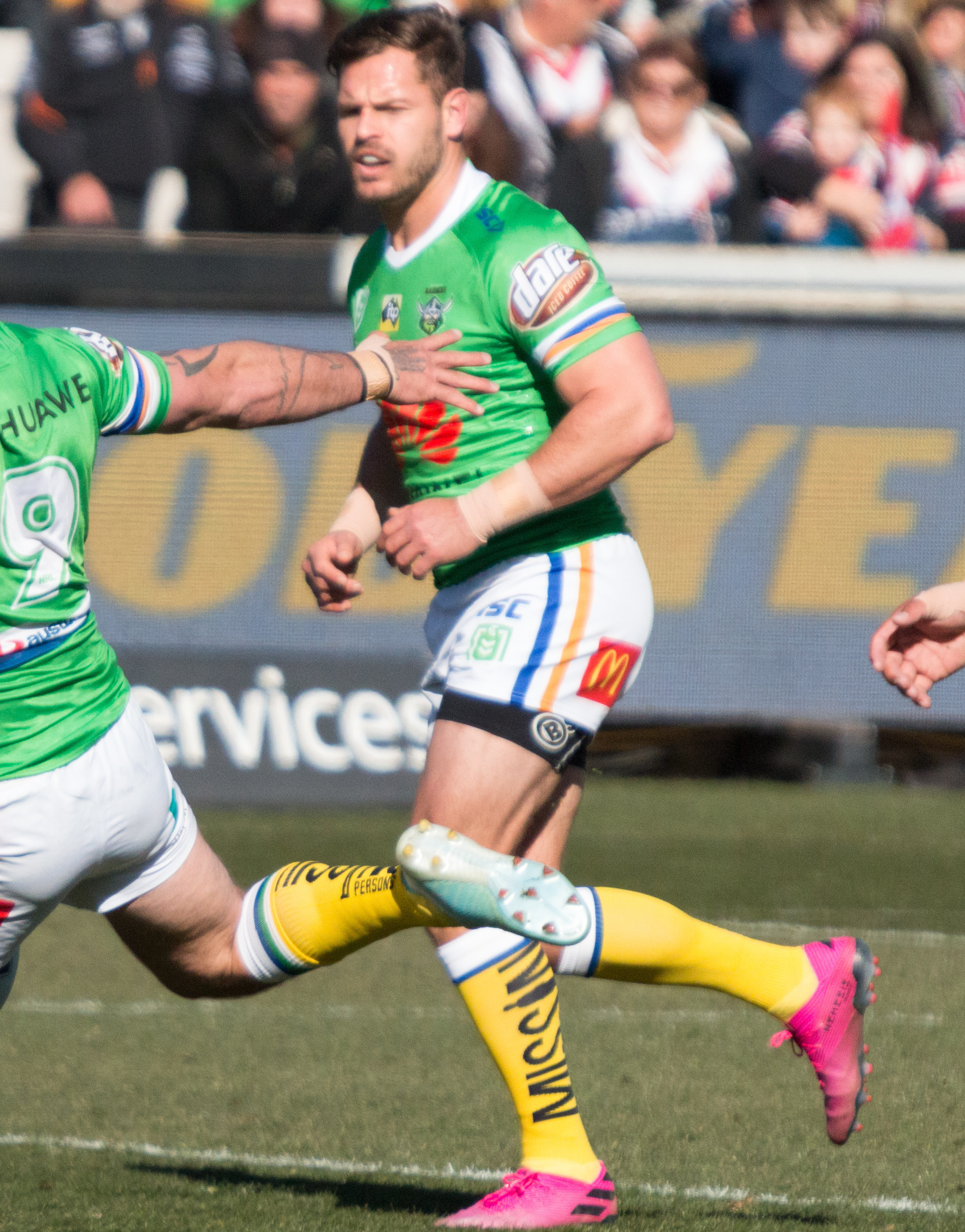

Personal information
- Full name: Aidan Yüçel Sezer
- Born: 24 June 1991 (age 35) Bankstown, New South Wales, Australia
- Height: 5 ft 11 in (1.80 m)
- Weight: 14 st 2 lb (90 kg)

Playing information
- Position: Scrum-half, Stand-off
Club
Years	Team	Pld	T	G	FG	P
2012–15	Gold Coast Titans	71	12	156	5	365
2016–19	Canberra Raiders	84	14	23	5	107
2020–21	Huddersfield Giants	25	9	63	2	164
2022–23	Leeds Rhinos	37	3	4	0	20
2024	Wests Tigers	17	0	20	1	41
2025–26	Hull FC	52	8	54	1	141
2027–	Bradford Bulls	0	0	0	0	0
	Total	286	46	320	14	838
Representative
Years	Team	Pld	T	G	FG	P
2013–17	Indigenous All Stars	2	0	1	0	2
2013	Prime Minister's XIII	1	1	6	0	16
2016	NSW City	1	0	6	0	12
2021	Combined Nations All Stars	1	0	5	0	10
- Source: As of 20 November 2026

Aidan Yüçel Sezer (born 24 June 1991) is an Australian professional rugby league footballer who plays as a scrum-half and stand-off for Bradford Bulls in the Super League.

He previously played for the Canberra Raiders, Gold Coast Titans, and Wests Tigers in the NRL and Hull FC, Leeds Rhinos and Huddersfield Giants in the Super League. Sezer has played for the Indigenous All Stars, Prime Minister's XIII, New South Wales City and Combined Nations All Stars sides.

== Background ==
Sezer was born in Bankstown, Sydney, New South Wales, Australia to a Turkish father, Yüçel, and an Indigenous Australian mother.

Sezer played his junior football for the East Hills Bulldogs before being signed by the Canterbury-Bankstown Bulldogs. Sezer played in the Bulldogs Toyota Cup team in 2010–2011, scoring over 300 points. On 31 August 2010, Sezer was named at five-eighth in the 2010 NYC Team of the Year. At the end of 2011, Sezer signed with the Gold Coast Titans after a lack of first-grade opportunities at the Bulldogs.

== Playing career ==
=== 2012 ===
In round 7 of the 2012 NRL season, Sezer made his NRL debut for the Gold Coast Titans against the Manly-Warringah Sea Eagles at five-eighth and scored a try in the Titans 26–14 upset win at Brookvale Oval. Sezer finished his debut year in the NRL with him playing in 18 matches, scoring four tries, kicking seven goals and kicking one field goal. On 4 December, Sezer re-signed with the Gold Coast for three years until the end of the 2015 NRL season.

=== 2013 ===
On 9 February 2013, Sezer played for the Indigenous All Stars team in the 2013 All Stars match against the NRL All Stars off the interchange bench in the Indigenous Team 32–6 win at Suncorp Stadium. Sezer finished the 2013 NRL season with him playing in 22 matches, scoring one try, kicking 75 goals and kicking two field goals for the Gold Coast Titans.

=== 2014 ===
In round 10 against the Brisbane Broncos at Suncorp Stadium, Sezer suffered a pectoral muscle injury in the Gold Coast's 22–8 loss which made him miss three months of football, until making a return in Round 22 against the Sydney Roosters at SFS which the Gold Coast lost the match 26–18. Sezer finished the Gold Coast Titans 2014 NRL season with him playing in 13 matches, scoring four matches, kicking 23 goals and kicking one field goal in an injury riddled year.

=== 2015 ===
On 20 January, Sezer was named in the Gold Coast 2015 NRL Auckland Nines squad. On 10 April, he signed a three-year contract with the Canberra Raiders starting in 2016. He finished his last year with the Gold Coast, having played in 18 matches, scoring three tries, kicking 51 goals and one field goal.

=== 2016 ===
In round 1 of the 2016 NRL season, Sezer made his club debut for the Canberra Raiders against the Penrith Panthers, playing at halfback and scoring two tries in the club's 30–22 win at Canberra Stadium. On 8 May 2016, Sezer played for City Origin against Country Origin, where he played at five-eighth and kicked 6 goals in the 44–30 win in Tamworth. Sezer finished the 2016 NRL season with him playing in 24 matches, scoring 5 tries and kicking 5 goals in his first year with the Canberra club.

=== 2017 ===
In February 2017, Sezer was selected in Canberra's 2017 Auckland Nines squad. On 10 February 2017, Sezer played for the Indigenous All Stars against the World All Stars in the 2017 All Stars match, playing off the interchange bench in the 34–8 win at Hunter Stadium. In round 5 against the Parramatta Eels, Sezer played his 100th NRL career match in the 30–18 win at Canberra Stadium. Sezer finished the 2017 NRL season with him playing in all of the Raiders 24 matches, scoring 4 tries and kicking 12 goals. Sezer and his halves partner Blake Austin were subjected to criticism at the end of the season for not lifting their game to close out matches and were taking the back seat for hooker Josh Hodgson who did the key playmaking a little too often than they should have.

=== 2018 ===
On 27 June 2018, Sezer extended his contract with the Canberra club to the end of the 2020 NRL season. Sezer finished the 2018 NRL season with 18 matches, 2 tries, 8 goals and 1 field goal. In October 2018, Sezer alongside Raiders team-mate Emre Guler trained with the Turkey national rugby league team for the 2018 Emerging Nations World Championship matches.

=== 2019 ===
Sezer started the 2019 NRL season as the club's first choice halfback and kicked a field goal in the opening round as Canberra defeated the Gold Coast 21–0. In round 2, Sezer suffered an oblique injury and was replaced by Sam Williams. Due to the good form of Canberra and Williams, Sezer was kept in reserve grade to play for Canberra's feeder club side the Mount Pritchard Mounties after recovering from his injury.

In round 23, Sezer played his 150th NRL game in Canberra's 14–18 loss to the Manly-Warringah Sea Eagles at GIO stadium in Canberra. In round 24, Sezer kicked 3 field goals in Canberra's 15–14 win against the Cronulla-Sutherland Sharks at Pointsbet Stadium, including the game winner in golden point extra time.

Sezer played for Canberra in the 2019 NRL Grand Final which was their first decider in 25 years. Canberra would go on to lose the final 14–8 against the Sydney Roosters at ANZ Stadium.

On 28 November, it was announced that Sezer had signed a two-year deal to join Super League side Huddersfield.

=== 2020 ===
Sezer made 16 appearances for Huddersfield in the 2020 Super League season as the club missed out on the finals.

=== 2021 ===
In round 5 of the 2021 Super League season, Sezer scored two tries and kicked two goals as Huddersfield defeated Leeds 14–13 to claim their first win of the year.

On 25 June 2021 he played for the Combined Nations All Stars in their 26–24 victory over England, staged at the Halliwell Jones Stadium, Warrington, as part of England's 2021 Rugby League World Cup preparation.

On 19 July, it was announced that Sezer would leave Huddersfield at the end of 2021 to take up a two-year deal with eight time Super League Champions Leeds.

=== 2022 ===
Sezer (left) with teammate Alex Seyfarth

In round 1 of the 2022 Super League season, Sezer made his club debut for Leeds in their 22–20 loss against Warrington.

Sezer missed the clubs 2022 Super League Grand Final loss against St Helens R.F.C. due to failing concussion protocols.

=== 2023 ===
On 21 August, Sezer signed a one-year deal to join the Wests Tigers ahead of the 2024 NRL season. Sezer played a total of 19 games for Leeds in the 2023 Super League season as the club finished 8th on the table and missed the playoffs.

=== 2024 ===
In round 2, Sezer made his club debut for the Wests Tigers in their loss against Canberra. In round 4, he kicked the winning field goal for the Wests Tigers as they upset Parramatta 17-16. In round 9, Sezer was placed on report but not sin-binned for a supposed hip-drop on Joshua Curran in the Tigers' 22-14 loss against the Canterbury-Bankstown Bulldogs. NRL head of football operations Graham Annesley would later state that Sezer's tackle was not a hip-drop, while also stating that Sezer should have been binned for dangerous contact instead. Sezer was later suspended for 4 weeks after the incident. Sezer played 17 games for the Wests Tigers throughout the 2024 NRL season as the club finished with the wooden spoon for a third consecutive year.

On 12 September 2024 it was reported that he had signed for Hull F.C. in the Super League on a two-year deal.

=== 2025 ===
In round 1 of the 2025 Super League season, Sezer made his club debut for Hull F.C. in their upset victory over Catalans Dragons.

Sezer played 25 games for Hull F.C. in the 2025 Super League season as the club finished 7th on the table.

=== 2026 ===
On 16 November 2026 it was reported that he had signed for Bradford Bulls in the Super League on a one-year deal for the 2027 season.

== Statistics ==
Year	Team	Games	Tries	Goals	FGs	Pts
2012	Gold Coast Titans	18	4	7	1	31
2013	Gold Coast Titans	22	1	75	2	156
2014	Gold Coast Titans	13	4	23	1	63
2015	Gold Coast Titans	18	3	51	1	115
2016	Canberra Raiders	24	5	5		30
2017	Canberra Raiders	24	4	12		40
2018	Canberra Raiders	18	2	6	1	21
2019	Canberra Raiders	18	3		4	16
2020	Huddersfield Giants	17	7	38	1	105
2021	Huddersfield Giants	8	2	25	1	59
2022	Leeds Rhinos	17	3	2		16
2023	Leeds Rhinos	20		2		4
2024	Wests Tigers	17		20	1	41
2025	Hull FC	14	1	26	1	57
2026	Hull FC	25	4	21		58
2027	Bradford Bulls					
	Totals	286	46	320	14	838
