= Oliver Wilson (rugby league) =

England international rugby league footballer

Personal information
- Full name: Oliver Wilson
- Born: 22 March 2000 (age 26) Halifax, West Yorkshire, England
- Height: 6 ft 3 in (1.90 m)
- Weight: 15 st 8 lb (99 kg)

Playing information
- Position: Prop
Club
Years	Team	Pld	T	G	FG	P
2018–19	Bradford Bulls	2	0	0	0	0
2019–25	Huddersfield Giants	114	2	0	0	8
2020(loan)	→ Halifax	1	0	0	0	0
2021(loan)	→ Bradford Bulls	2	0	0	0	0
2026–	Wigan Warriors	0	0	0	0	0
	Total	119	2	0	0	8
Representative
Years	Team	Pld	T	G	FG	P
2024	England	1	0	0	0	0
- Source: As of 31 May 2026

Oliver Wilson (born 22 March 2000) is a professional rugby league footballer who plays as a prop for the Wigan Warriors in the Super League.

He has previously played for Bradford in League 1 and the Championship, and spent time on loan from Huddersfield at Halifax in the Championship.

== Background ==
Wilson was born in Halifax, West Yorkshire, England.

== Playing career ==
=== Bradford Bulls ===
Between 2018 and 2019 he played for the Bradford Bulls.

=== Huddersfield Giants ===
Wilson left Bradford and became a part of Huddersfield's academy team, eventually becoming a first team regular.

Wilson has spent time on loan from Huddersfield at Halifax in the Championship.

In 2019, he made his Super League début for Huddersfield against Salford.

On 28 May 2022, he played for Huddersfield in their 2022 Challenge Cup Final loss to Wigan.

Wilson played 20 matches with Huddersfield in the 2023 Super League season as the club finished ninth on the table and missed the playoffs.

Wilson played 17 games for Huddersfield in the 2025 Super League season as the club finished 10th on the table.

=== Bradford Bulls (loan) ===
On 26 May 2021 it was reported that he had signed for the Bradford Bulls in the RFL Championship on loan.

=== Wigan Warriors ===
On 10 November 2025 it was reported that he had signed for the Wigan Warriors in the Super League on a 4-year deal.

=== International ===
He made his England début on 29 June 2024 v France in Toulouse.
