= Oliver Russell =

English rugby league footballer

Olly Russell
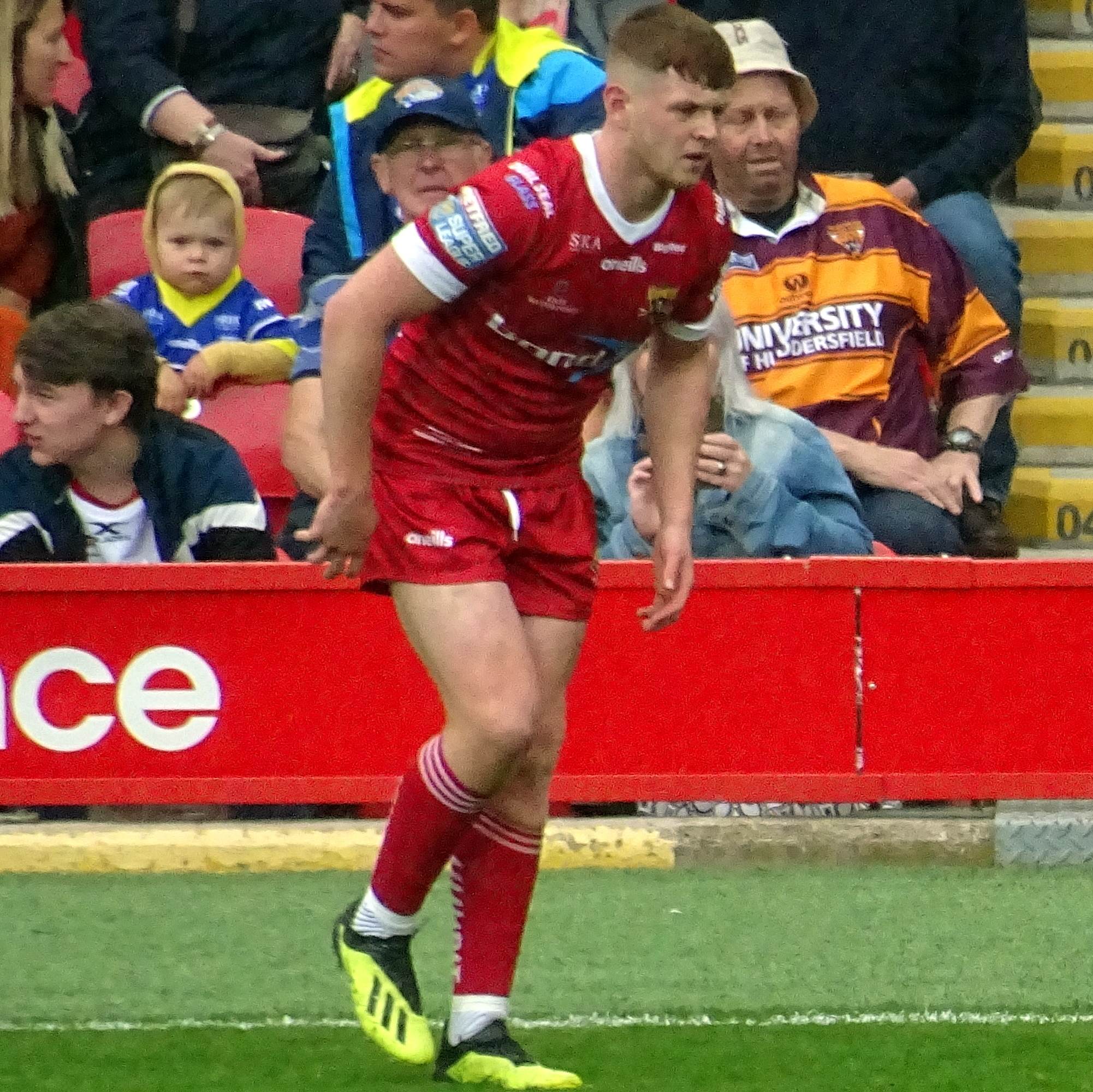

Personal information
- Full name: Oliver Russell
- Born: 21 September 1998 (age 28) Oldham, Greater Manchester, England
- Height: 5 ft 11 in (1.80 m)

Playing information
- Position: Stand-off, Scrum-half
Club
Years	Team	Pld	T	G	FG	P
2018–24	Huddersfield Giants	102	5	131	4	286
2019(loan)	→ Leigh Centurions	0	0	0	0	0
2019(loan)	→ Batley Bulldogs	2	0	0	0	0
2019(loan)	→ Workington Town	1	0	0	0	0
2021(loan)	→ Halifax Panthers	1	0	0	0	0
2025–	Wakefield Trinity	7	2	0	0	8
2025(loan)	→ Salford Red Devils	2	0	0	0	0
2025(loan)	→ Huddersfield Giants	4	0	0	1	1
2026(loan)	→Huddersfield Giants	17	2	15	1	39
2027	→ Oldham RLFC (loan)	0	0	0	0	0
	Total	136	9	146	6	334
Representative
Years	Team	Pld	T	G	FG	P
2022–	England Knights	1	1	0	0	4
- Source: As of 6 October 2026

Olly Russell (born 21 September 1998) is an English professional rugby league footballer who plays as a stand-off & scrum-half for Oldham RLFC in the RFL Championship, on season-long loan from Wakefield Trinity in the Super League.

In 2019 he spent time on loan from Huddersfield at the Leigh Centurions and the Batley Bulldogs in the Championship, as well as Workington Town in League 1.

== Background ==
Russell was born in Oldham, England.

Russell played his junior amateur rugby for Oldham Saint Anne's, spending some time at Wigan St Judes.

He is a product of the Giants Academy after a spell with Wigan's Academy.

== Career ==
=== Huddersfield Giants ===
After a spell with Wigan, he moved to Huddersfield's academy side and was an integral part of their run to the academy semi final in 2018. In 2018 he made his Super League début for Huddersfield against the Widnes Vikings. On 28 May 2022, Russell played for Huddersfield in their 2022 Challenge Cup Final loss to Wigan.

=== Halifax Panthers (loan) ===
On 26 May 2021 it was reported that he had signed for the Halifax Panthers in the RFL Championship on loan.

=== Wakefield Trinity ===
On 28 June 2024 it was reported that he had signed for Wakefield Trinity in the Super League on a four-year deal.

=== Salford Red Devils (loan) ===
On 9 July 2025 it was reported that he had signed for Salford Red Devils in the Super League on short-term loan

=== Huddersfield Giants (loan) ===
On 20 August 2025 it was reported that he had signed for Huddersfield Giants in the Super League on loan for the remainder of the 2025 season

=== Huddersfield Giants (loan) ===
On 18 November 2025 it was reported that he had re-joined Huddersfield Giants in the Super League on long-term loan

=== Oldham RLFC (loan) ===
On 6 October 2026 it was reported that he had signed for Oldham RLFC in the RFL Championship on season-long loan
