= Sam Hewitt =

English rugby league footballer

Personal information
- Full name: Samuel Hewitt
- Born: 29 April 1999 (age 26) England

Playing information
- Position: Second-row, Prop, Centre
Club
Years	Team	Pld	T	G	FG	P
2018–	Huddersfield Giants	100	14	0	0	56
2019(loan)	→ Workington Town	6	2	0	0	8
2020(loan)	→ Halifax Panthers	1	0	0	0	0
2021(loan)	→ Halifax Panthers	7	2	0	0	8
2022(loan)	→ Halifax Panthers	1	0	0	0	0
2023(loan)	→ Wakefield Trinity	7	0	0	0	0
	Total	122	18	0	0	72
- Source: As of 24 March 2026

Sam Hewitt (born 29 April 1999) is an English professional rugby league footballer who plays as a second-row forward for the Huddersfield Giants in the Super League

== Playing career ==
=== Huddersfield Giants ===
In 2018 he made his Super League début for Huddersfield against Leeds.

Hewitt is a graduate of Huddersfield's Academy system. Hewitt played 14 matches with Huddersfield in the 2023 Super League season as the club finished ninth on the table and missed the playoffs.

He played 17 games for Huddersfield in the 2024 Super League season as the club finished 9th for a second consecutive year.

Hewitt played 15 matches for Huddersfield in the 2025 Super League season as the club finished 10th on the table.

==== Workington Town (loan) ====
He has spent time on loan from Huddersfield at Workington Town in League 1.

==== Halifax Panthers (2021 loan) ====
On 14 February 2021, it was reported that he had signed a season-long loan deal for Halifax in the RFL Championship.

==== Wakefield Trinity (loan) ====
On 11 March 2023, Hewitt signed for his hometown club Wakefield Trinity on loan.
