= Owen Trout =

England international rugby league footballer

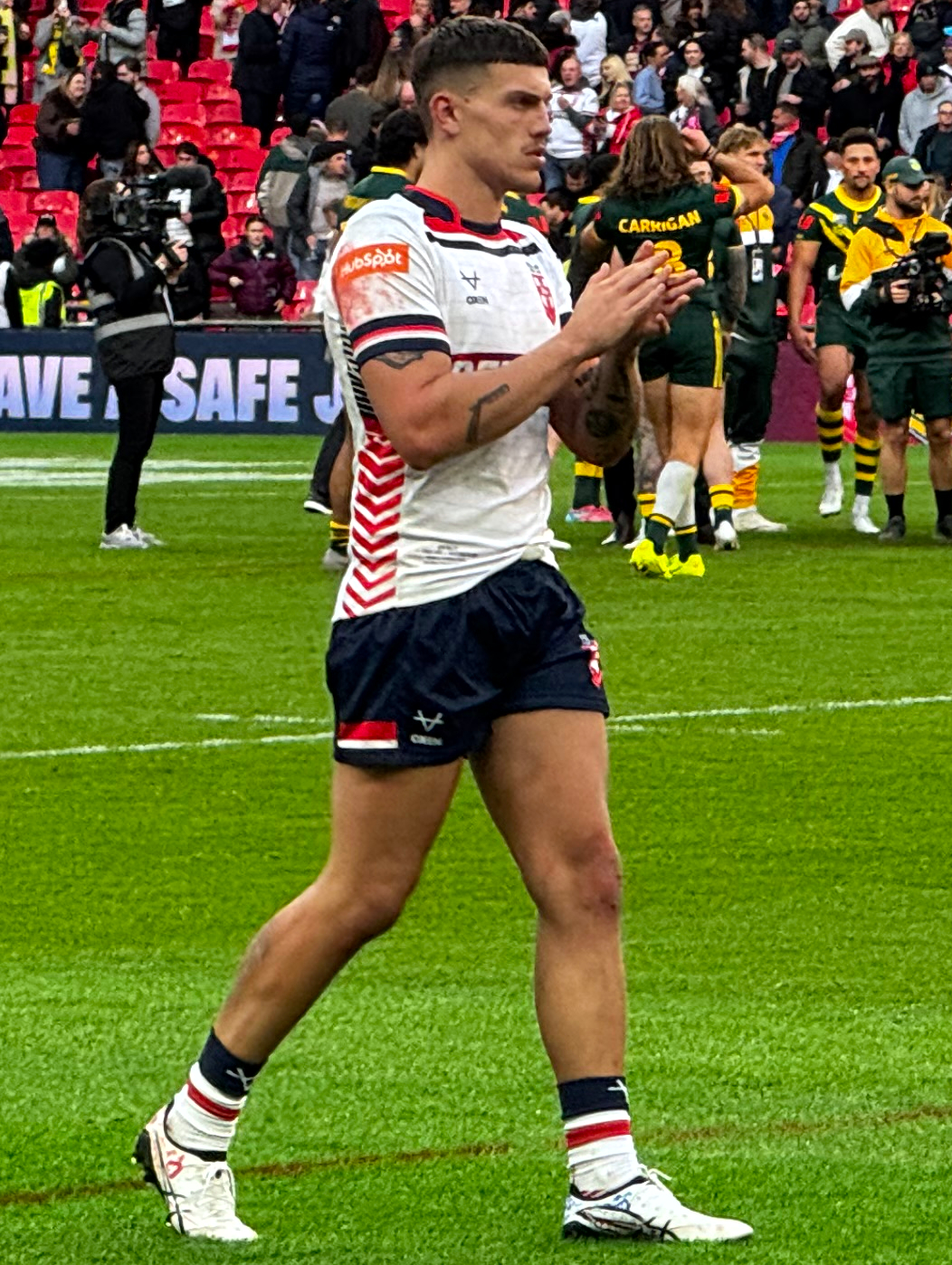

Personal information
- Full name: Owen Trout
- Born: 15 October 1999 (age 27) Wakefield, West Yorkshire, England
- Height: 6 ft 3 in (1.91 m)
- Weight: 16 st 1 lb (102 kg)

Playing information
- Position: Prop, Loose forward, Second-row
Club
Years	Team	Pld	T	G	FG	P
2019	Leeds Rhinos	3	0	0	0	0
2019(loan)	→ Dewsbury Rams	15	4	0	0	16
2019(loan)	→ Featherstone Rovers	1	0	0	0	0
2020–23	Huddersfield Giants	54	10	0	0	40
2024–26	Leigh Leopards	87	11	0	0	44
2027–	Cronulla Sharks	0	0	0	0	0
	Total	160	25	0	0	100
Representative
Years	Team	Pld	T	G	FG	P
2022	England Knights	1	1	0	0	4
2025	England	1	0	0	0	0
- Source: As of 20 October 2026
- Relatives: Kyle Trout (brother)

Owen Trout (born 15 October 1999) is a professional rugby league footballer who plays as a loose forward, second-row or prop for the Cronulla-Sutherland Sharks in the NRL and England at international level.

He has previously played for the Huddersfield Giants, Leeds Rhinos and Leigh Leopards in the Super League, and on loan from Leeds at the Dewsbury Rams and Featherstone Rovers in the RFL Championship.

Trout was called in to the England squad for the first time ahead of the Ashes in 2026.

== Background ==
Owen Trout is a rugby league player, brother of the rugby league footballer; Kyle Trout.

== Career ==
=== Leeds Rhinos ===
In 2019 he made his professional debut on loan at the Dewsbury Rams in the Championship.

Later in 2019 he made his debut for Leeds Rhinos against Workington Town in the Challenge cup.

=== Huddersfield Giants ===
Trout made a move to Huddersfield in 2020 playing six games.

In 2021 he played 15 games.

On 28 May 2022, Trout played for Huddersfield in their 2022 Challenge Cup Final loss to Wigan.

=== Leigh Leopards ===
On 13 October 2023 it was reported that he had signed a three-year deal to join Leigh. Trout played in nearly every match for Leigh in the 2024 Super League season which saw the club finish fifth on the table.

Trout played 27 games for Leigh in the 2025 Super League season including their semi-final loss to rivals Wigan.

=== Cronulla Sharks ===
On 26 March 2026, Trout was announced to have signed a two-year deal with the Cronulla Sharks of the National Rugby League from the 2027 season.
