= Matty English =

English professional rugby league footballer

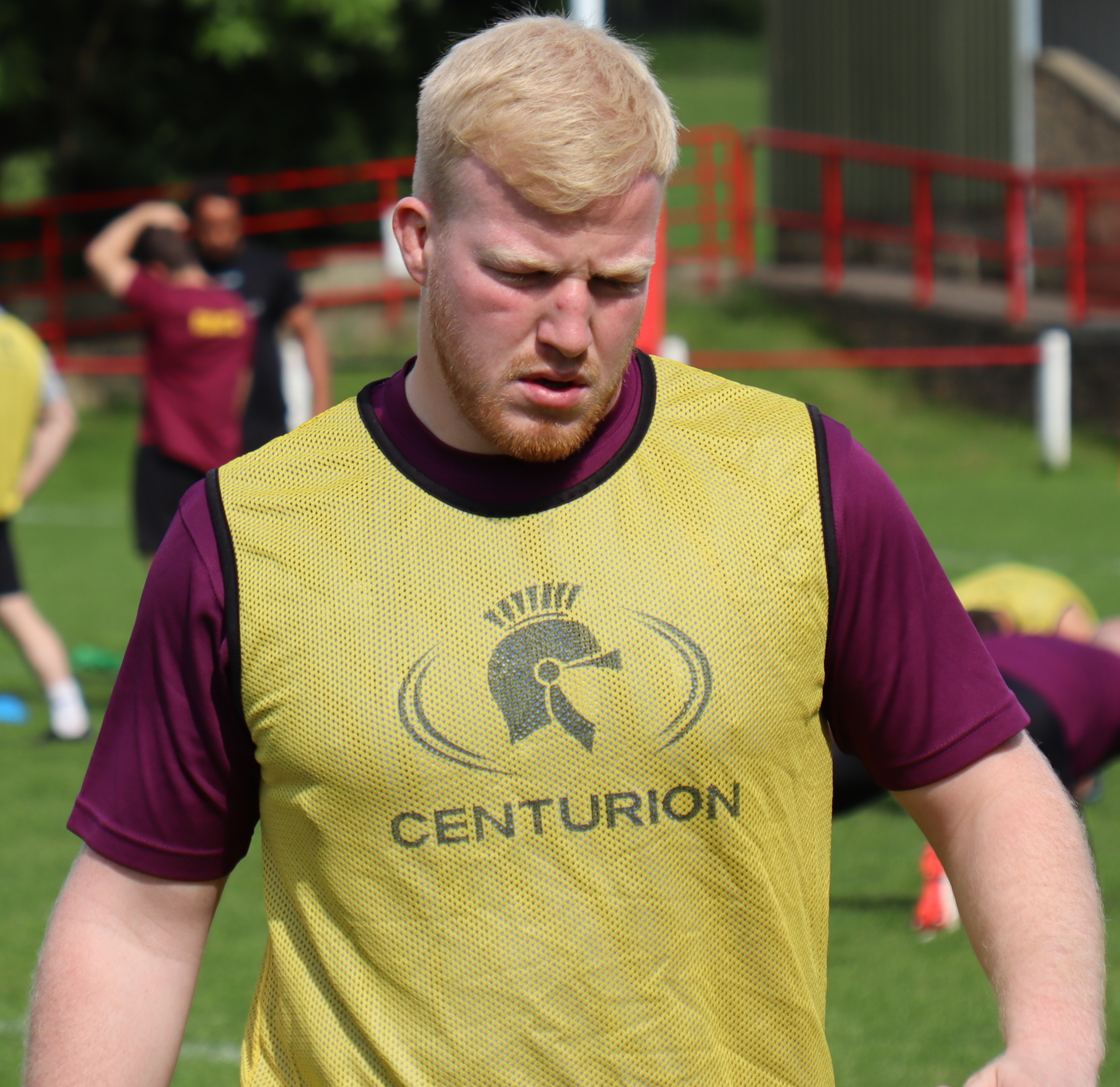

Personal information
- Full name: Matthew English
- Born: 14 November 1997 (age 28) Wakefield, West Yorkshire, England
- Height: 6 ft 0 in (1.83 m)
- Weight: 16 st 1 lb (102 kg)

Playing information
- Position: Prop, Loose forward
Club
Years	Team	Pld	T	G	FG	P
2017–26	Huddersfield Giants	157	9	0	0	36
2018(loan)	→ Dewsbury Rams	5	0	0	0	0
2024(loan)	→ Castleford Tigers	4	0	0	0	0
2026(loan)	→ York Knights	0	0	0	0	0
2027–	York Knights	0	0	0	0	0
	Total	166	9	0	0	36
Representative
Years	Team	Pld	T	G	FG	P
2019–22	England Knights	2	0	0	0	0
- Source: As of 6 November 2026

Matty English (born 14 November 1997) is an English professional rugby league footballer who plays as a prop forward for the York Knights in the Super League, as well playing for the England Knights at international level.

He has spent time on loan from Huddersfield at the Dewsbury Rams in the Championship and at the Castleford Tigers in the Super League.

== Background ==
English was born in Wakefield, West Yorkshire, England.

== Playing career ==
=== Huddersfield Giants ===
English is a product of the Huddersfield Giants' academy system and is nicknamed 'the Polar Bear'.

On 23 April 2017, he made his first team debut for Huddersfield against the Swinton Lions in the Challenge Cup.

On 28 May 2022, English played for Huddersfield in their 2022 Challenge Cup final loss against the Wigan Warriors.

English played 19 games for Huddersfield in the 2023 Super League season as the club finished ninth on the table and missed the playoffs. English played 14 matches for Huddersfield in the 2024 Super League season which saw the club finish 9th on the table. English played 18 matches for Huddersfield in the 2025 Super League season as the club finished 10th on the table.

==== Castleford Tigers (loan) ====
On 12 June 2024, it was announced that English would sign for the Castleford Tigers in the Super League on loan. He joined on an initial two-week deal, rolling week to week thereafter. He made four appearances for the Tigers, with head coach Craig Lingard expressing the club's desire to keep him as long as possible. Huddersfield announced his recall on 15 July.

=== York Knights (loan) ===
On 29 July 2026 it was reported that he had signed for the York Knights in the Super League, on loan from Huddersfield.

=== York Knights ===
On 21 September 2026 it was reported that he had signed for York Knights in the Super League on a permanent deal

== International career ==
He represented England academy on tour to Australia

In 2019 Matty was called into the England Knights squad along with 3 other Giants players.

In 2019 he was selected for the England Knights against Jamaica at Headingley Rugby Stadium.
