= 2008 Huddersfield Giants season =

- Super League Rank: 10th
- Challenge Cup: Fifth round
← 2007	List of seasons	2009 →

In the 2008 rugby league season, Huddersfield Giants competed in Super League XIII and the 2008 Challenge Cup.

== Results ==
=== Super League ===
==== Table ====
Super League XIII
Pos	Team	Pld	W	D	L	PF	PA	PD	Pts	Qualification
1	St. Helens (L)	27	21	1	5	940	457	+483	43	Semi-final
2	Leeds Rhinos (C)	27	21	0	6	863	413	+450	42	Semi-final
3	Catalans Dragons	27	16	2	9	694	625	+69	34	Elimination semi-finals
4	Wigan Warriors	27	13	3	11	648	698	−50	29	Elimination semi-finals
5	Bradford Bulls	27	14	0	13	705	625	+80	28	Elimination semi-finals
6	Warrington Wolves	27	14	0	13	690	713	−23	28	Elimination semi-finals
7	Hull Kingston Rovers	27	11	1	15	564	713	−149	23	
8	Wakefield Trinity Wildcats	27	11	0	16	574	760	−186	22	
9	Harlequins	27	11	0	16	569	763	−194	22	
10	Huddersfield Giants	27	10	1	16	638	681	−43	21	
11	Hull F.C.	27	8	1	18	538	699	−161	17	
12	Castleford Tigers	27	7	1	19	593	869	−276	15	

Source: superleague.co.uk
Rules for classification: 1st on competition points; 2nd on match points difference.
Competition points: for win = 2; for draw = 1; for loss = 0.
(C) Champions; (L) League Leaders' Shield Winners

==== Super League results ====
W Win D Draw L Loss

Super League results
Date	Round	Versus	H/A	Venue	Result	Score	Tries	Goals	Attendance	Report
10 February	1	Leeds Rhinos	H	Galpharm Stadium	L	10–30	Jensen, Robinson	Thorman	15,629	Super League
16 February	2	Bradford Bulls	A	Grattan Stadium, Odsal	L	12–38	Whatuira, Robinson	Thorman (2)	10,124	Super League
24 February	3	Castleford Tigers	H	Galpharm Stadium	W	64–12	Thorman, Elford, Whatuira, Lolesi (2), Jensen, Brown, Robinson (2), Mason, Snitch, Raleigh	Thorman (8)	7,184	Super League
2 March	4	Hull F.C.	H	Galpharm Stadium	W	28–8	Elford, Lolesi, Brown, Robinson, Crabtree	Thorman (4)	8,012	Super League
8 March	5	Harlequins	A	Twickenham Stoop	L	0–24			3,284	Super League
16 March	6	Wigan Warriors	H	Galpharm Stadium	L	19–20	Brown, Robinson	Cudjoe (5), Brown (FG)	8,417	Super League
21 March	7	Warrington Wolves	A	Halliwell Jones Stadium	L	14–30	Lolesi, Crabtree	Cudjoe (2), Hemingway	9,320	Super League
24 March	8	St Helens	H	Galpharm Stadium	W	28–26	Griffin (2), Lolesi, Whatuira, Jensen	Thorman (4)	7,131	Super League
30 March	9	Hull Kingston Rovers	A	New Craven Park	D	24–24	Thorman, Whatuira, Jensen, Gatis	Thorman (4)	7,101	Super League
4 April	10	Catalans Dragons	H	Galpharm Stadium	L	16–20	Lolesi, Hudson, Griffin	Thorman (2)	4,071	Super League
12 April	11	Wakefield Trinity Wildcats	H	Galpharm Stadium	L	16–18	Jensen, Robinson	Thorman (4)	5,693	Super League
27 April	12	Hull F.C.	A	KC Stadium	L	20–28	Whatuira, Robinson, Snitch	Cudjoe, Hemingway (3)	12,420	Super League
27 April	13	Wigan Warriors	N	Millennium Stadium	L	34–36	Jensen, Lawrence, Robinson, Skandalis, Raleigh (2)	Robinson (3), Hemingway (2)	12,000	Super League
18 May	14	Hull Kingston Rovers	H	Galpharm Stadium	W	50–16	Cudjoe, Aspinwall, Lawrence (2), Whatuira, Elford, Robinson, Skandalis, Raleigh	Thorman (7)	7,248	Super League
24 May	15	Catalans Dragons	A	Stade Gilbert Brutus	L	0–48			7,785	RLP
15 June	17	Wakefield Trinity Wildcats	A	Belle Vue	L	26–28			6,271	RLP
22 June	18	Harlequins	H	Galpharm Stadium	W	26–16			4,176	RLP
29 June	19	St Helens	A	The GPW Recruitment Stadium	L	16–46			8,597	RLP
6 July	20	Bradford Bulls	H	Galpharm Stadium	W	25–24			10,786	RLP
11 July	21	Leeds Rhinos	A	Headingley Stadium	L	8–46			14,739	RLP
19 July	22	Warrington Wolves	H	Galpharm Stadium	L	18–19			5,033	RLP
25 July	16	Wigan Warriors	A	JJB Stadium	W	34–4			12,216	RLP
3 August	23	Castleford Tigers	A	The Jungle	W	40–14			6,935	RLP
10 August	24	Hull F.C.	A	KC Stadium	W	30–24			11,921	RLP
6 July	20	Catalans Dragons	H	Galpharm Stadium	L	20–22			12,127	RLP
24 August	26	St Helens	H	Galpharm Stadium	L	22–40			6,150	RLP
6 September	27	Warrington Wolves	A	Halliwell Jones Stadium	W	38–20			8,585	RLP

=== Challenge Cup ===
W Win L Loss

Challenge Cup results
Date	Round	Versus	H/A	Venue	Result	Score	Tries	Goals	Attendance	Report
20 April	4	Halifax	A	The Shay	W	42–24	Hudson, Robinson (2), Jensen, Hemingway, Lolesi, Brown, Raleigh	Thorman (5)	3,794	RFL
11 May	5	Hull Kingston Rovers	A	New Craven Park	L	22–42			6,618	RLP

== Players ==
=== Squad ===
Squad no	Player	Apps	Tries	Goals	Drop Goals	Pts
1	Chris Thorman	7	2	23	0	50
2	Martin Aspinwall	0	0	0	0	0
3	Shane Elford	7	2	0	0	8
4	Paul Whatuira	9	5	0	0	20
5	David Hodgson	0	0	0	0	0
6	Kevin Brown	9	3	0	1	10
7	Luke Robinson	9	6	0	0	24
8	Eorl Crabtree	9	2	0	0	8
9	George Gatis	8	1	0	0	4
10	John Skandalis	9	0	0	0	0
11	Jamahl Lolesi	9	4	0	0	16
12	Andy Raleigh	9	1	0	0	4
13	Stephen Wild	7	0	0	0	0
14	Stuart Jones	5	0	0	0	0
15	Paul Jackson	8	0	0	0	0
16	Keith Mason	8	1	0	0	4
17	Steve Snitch	8	1	0	0	4
18	Darrell Griffin	8	2	0	0	8
19	Ryan Hudson	9	0	0	0	0
20	Tom Hemingway	1	0	1	0	2
21	Leroy Cudjoe	3	0	7	0	14
22	Michael Lawrence	2	0	0	0	0
24	Rod Jensen	9	4	0	0	16

=== Transfers ===
==== Gins ====
Player	Previous club
Luke Robinson	Salford City Reds
David Hodgson	Salford City Reds
Paul Whatuira	Wests Tigers
George Gatis	New Zealand Warriors
Danny Kirmond	Featherstone Rovers
Nathan Brown	St George Illawarra

==== Losses ====
Player	To
Brad Drew	Wakefield Trinity Wildcats
Paul Reilly	Wakefield Trinity Wildcats
Chris Nero	Bradford Bulls
Robbie Paul	Salford City Reds
Mat Gardner	Salford City Reds
