= 2007 Huddersfield Giants season =

- Super League rank: 5th
- Challenge Cup: Quarter-finals
List of seasons	2008 →

This article is about the 2007 season of the Huddersfield Giants.

== Results ==
=== Rounds 1–5 ===
Round 1

11 February 2007 – 3.00pm

LOSS – 0 Pts

Bradford Bulls	18–14	Huddersfield Giants
Tries: Morrison, Hape, Solomona; Goals: Deacon (3)		Tries: Lolesi, Jones; Goals: Thorman (3)

Odsal Stadium, Bradford
Attendance: 12,130
Referee: Richard Silverwood

Round 2

18 February 2007 – 3.00pm

LOSS – 0 Pts

Huddersfield Giants	10–17	Hull Kingston Rovers
Tries: Nero, Wild; Goals: Thorman		Tries: Cockayne, Murrell; Goals: Morton (4); Drop goals: Webster

Galpharm Stadium, Huddersfield
Attendance: 7,700
Referee: Ben Thaler

Round 3 NB Game played before Round 1 due to St Helens' involvement in World Club Challenge

2 February 2007 – 7.05pm

LOSS – 0 Pts

Huddersfield Giants	10–18	St Helens R.F.C.
Tries: Gardner; Goals: Thorman (3)		Tries: Gilmour (2), Pryce, Gardner; Goals: Long

Galpharm Stadium, Huddersfield
Attendance: 9,212
Referee: Ashley Klein

Round 4

4 March 2007 – 3.00pm

LOSS – 0 Pts

Leeds Rhinos	16–12	Huddersfield Giants
Tries: Toopi, Smith, Jones-Buchanan; Goals: Sinfield (2)		Tries: Thorman, Crabtree; Goals: Thorman (2)

Headingley Carnegie Stadium, Leeds

Round 5

11 March 2007 – 3.00pm

LOSS – 0 Pts

Huddersfield Giants	12–16	Hull F.C.
Tries: Thorman (2); Goals: Thorman (2)		Tries: Briscoe, Sing, King; Goals: Tickle (2)

Galpharm Stadium, Huddersfield
Attendance: 7,188

=== Rounds 6–10 ===
Round 6

11 March 2007 – 3.00pm

LOSS – 0 Pts

Catalans Dragons	23–22	Huddersfield Giants
Tries: Greenshields, Bosc, Mogg, Teixido; Goals: Bosc (3); Drop goals: Jones		Tries: Nero, Jones, Wild, Hudson; Goals: Hemingway (2), Drew

Attendance: 8,300

Round 7

25 March 2007 – 3.00pm

LOSS – 0 Pts

Huddersfield Giants	16–18	Salford City Reds
Tries: Gardner, Thorman, Raleigh; Goals: Thorman (2)		Tries: Turner, Robinson (2); Goals: Wilshere (3)

Galpharm Stadium, Huddersfield
Attendance: 5,275

Round 8

6 April 2007 – 3.00pm

WIN – 2 Pts

Huddersfield Giants	56–12	Wakefield Trinity Wildcats
Tries: Reilly, Aspinwall, Brown (3), Drew, Paul, Raleigh, Wild, Jones; Goals: Thorman (7)		Tries: Blaymire, Moore; Goals: Rooney (2)

Galpharm Stadium, Huddersfield
Attendance: 6,757

Round 9

9 April 2007 – 3.00pm

WIN – 2 Pts

Warrington Wolves	18–26	Huddersfield Giants
Tries: Gleeson, Fa'afili (2); Goals: Briers (3)		Tries: Aspinwall, Drew, Crabtree; Goals: Thorman (7)

Halliwell Jones Stadium, Warrington
Attendance: 9,483

Round 10

15 April 2007 – 3.00pm

WIN – 2 Pts

Huddersfield Giants	41–16	Wigan Warriors
Tries: Reilly, Drew, Hudson, Wild, Snitch, Crabtree; Goals: Thorman (8); Drop goals: Thorman		Tries: Vaealiki (2), Leuluai; Goals: Richards (2)

Galpharm Stadium, Huddersfield
Attendance: 7,117

=== Rounds 11–15 ===
Round 11

22 April 2007 – 3.00pm

WIN – 2 Pts

Huddersfield Giants	46–16	Harlequins RL
Tries: Reilly (2), Nero, Lolesi, Thorman, Wild, Snitch (2); Goals: Thorman (7)		Tries: Smith, Randall, Grayshon; Goals: Purdham (2)

Galpharm Stadium, Huddersfield
Attendance: 4,894

Round 12

27 April 2007 – 8.00pm

WIN – 2 Pts

Hull Kingston Rovers	16–28	Huddersfield Giants
Tries: Bauer, Gene; Goals: Cooke (4)		Tries: Lolesi, Wild, Raleigh, Jones; Goals: Thorman (6)

New Craven Park, Hull
Attendance: 6,597

Round 13 – MILLENNIUM MAGIC

6 May 2007 – 2.00pm

WIN – 2 Pts

Huddersfield Giants	36–12	Wakefield Trinity Wildcats
Tries: Aspinwall, Lolesi, Thorman, Paul, Wild (2); Goals: Thorman (6)		Tries: Rooney, White; Goals: Rooney (2)

Millennium Stadium, Cardiff

Round 14

11 February 2007 – 8.00pm

WIN – 2 Pts

Huddersfield Giants	36–12	Bradford Bulls
Tries: Thorman (2), Brown, Skandalis, Jones, Wild; Goals: Thorman (6)		Tries: B Harris, Vainikolo; Goals: I Harris (2)

Galpharm Stadium, Huddersfield
Attendance: 8,667

Round 15

25 May 2007 – 8.00pm

LOSS – 0 Pts

Salford City Reds	14–12	Huddersfield Giants
Tries: Hodgson, McGuinness, Viane; Goals: Wilshere (3)		Tries: Reilly, Wild; Goals: Thorman (2)

The Willows, Salford
Attendance: 3,379

=== Rounds 16–20 ===
Round 16

3 June 2007 – 3.15pm

DRAW – 1 Pt

Hull F.C.	9–9	Huddersfield Giants
Tries: Tickle; Goals: Tickle (2); Drop goals: Horne		Tries: Thorman; Goals: Thorman (2); Drop goals: Thorman

KC Stadium, Hull
Attendance: 12,094

Round 17

17 June 2007 – 3.00pm

LOSS – 0 Pts

Huddersfield Giants	12–25	Leeds Rhinos
Tries: Nero, Jackson; Goals: Drew (2)		Tries: Tansey, Donald, McGuire; Goals: Sinfield (4); Drop Goals: Kevin Sinfield

Galpharm Stadium, Huddersfield
Attendance: 10,241

Round 18

30 June 2007 – 6.00pm

LOSS – 0 Pts

St Helens R.F.C.	54–4	Huddersfield Giants
Tries: Wellens, Gardner, Talau, Tyrer (2), Pryce, Gilmour, Wilkin, Fa'asavalu; Goals: Tyrer (7)		Tries: Nero

Knowsley Road, St Helens
Attendance: 7,771

Round 19

8 July 2007 – 3.00pm

LOSS – 0 Pts

Huddersfield Giants	28–47	Warrington Wolves
Tries: Aspinwall, Drew, Crabtree; Goals: Thorman (7)		Tries: Gleeson, Fa'afili (2); Goals: Briers (3)

Galpharm Stadium, Huddersfield
Attendance: 6,822

Round 20

15 July 2007 – 3.30pm

WIN – 2 Pts

Wakefield Trinity Wildcats	23–24	Huddersfield Giants
Tries: Fox (2), Obst (2); Goals: Rooney (4); Drop Goals: Rooney		Tries: Thorman, Elford, Wild, Snitch; Goals: Thorman (4)

Atlantic Solutions Stadium, Wakefield
Attendance: 5,241

=== Rounds 21–27 ===
Round 21

21 July 2007 – 3.00pm

WIN – 2 Pts

Harlequins RL	10–22	Huddersfield Giants
Tries: Smith, McCarthy-Scarsbrook; Goals: Sykes		Tries: Nero (2), Brown, Snitch; Goals: Thorman (3)

Griffin Park, Brentford
Attendance: 2,478

Round 22

5 August 2007 – 3.00pm

WIN – 2 Pts

Huddersfield Giants	42–22	Catalans Dragons
Tries: Thorman, Jensen, Elford (2), Griffin, Wild; Goals: Thorman (7)		Tries: Khattabi, Chan, Mogg, Croker; Goals: Jones (3)

Galpharm Stadium, Huddersfield
Attendance: 4,313

Round 23

10 August 2007 – 8.00pm

LOSS – 0 Pts

Wigan Warriors	20–12	Huddersfield Giants
Tries: Goulding (2), Higham; Goals: Richards (6)		Tries: Nero, Wild; Goals: Thorman (2); Drop goals: Thorman

JJB Stadium, Wigan
Attendance: 12,744

Round 24

19 August 2007 – 3.00pm

WIN – 2 Pts

Huddersfield Giants	26–22	Bradford Bulls
Tries: Jensen, Lolesi (3); Goals: Drew (5)		Tries: McKenna, Solomona, Henderson; Goals: I Harris (5)

Galpharm Stadium, Huddersfield
Attendance: 6,824

Round 25

31 August 2007 – 8.00pm

WIN – 2 Pts

Warrington Wolves	22–34	Huddersfield Giants
Tries: Fa'afili, Westwood (3), Penny; Goals: Westwood		Tries: Lolesi, Jensen, Brown, Drew, Hudson; Goals: Thorman (7)

Halliwell Jones Stadium, Warrington
Attendance: 8,843

Round 26

9 September 2007 – 4.00pm

WIN – 2 Pts

Huddersfield Giants	24–22	Wakefield Trinity Wildcats
Tries: Lolesi (2), Reilly, Wild, Paul; Goals: Thorman (4)		Tries: White, Demetriou (2); Goals: Rooney (5)

Galpharm Stadium, Huddersfield
Attendance: 7,066

Round 27

17 September 2007 – 7.00pm

LOSS – 0 Pts

Hull Kingston Rovers	25–24	Huddersfield Giants
Tries: Vella, Fisher (2), Fisher; Goals: Cooke (4); Drop goals: Cooke		Tries: Reilly (2), Nero, Jensen (2); Goals: Thorman (2)

New Craven Park, Kingston-upon-Hull
Attendance: 6,700

=== Playoffs ===
22 September 2007 – 7.00pm

LOSS – ELIMINATED

Hull F.C.	22–16	Huddersfield Giants
Tries: Raynor (2), Lee, Horne; Goals: Tickle (3)		Tries: Hudson, Reilly, Brown; Goals: Thorman (2)

KC Stadium, Hull
Referee: Ashley Klein

== Super League XII table ==
Pos	Team	Pld	W	D	L	PF	PA	PD	Pts	Qualification
1	St Helens (L)	27	19	0	8	783	422	+361	38	Semifinal
2	Leeds Rhinos (C)	27	18	1	8	747	487	+260	37	Semifinal
3	Bradford Bulls	27	17	1	9	778	560	+218	33 (Note: Bradford deducted 2 points for salary cap breaches.)	Elimination semifinal
4	Hull F.C.	27	14	2	11	573	553	+20	30	Elimination semifinal
5	Huddersfield Giants	27	13	1	13	638	543	+95	27	Elimination semifinal
6	Wigan Warriors	27	15	1	11	621	527	+94	27 (Note: Wigan deducted 4 points for salary cap breaches.)	Elimination semifinal
7	Warrington Wolves	27	13	0	14	693	736	−43	26	
8	Wakefield Trinity Wildcats	27	11	1	15	596	714	−118	23	
9	Harlequins	27	10	3	14	495	636	−141	23	
10	Catalans Dragons	27	10	1	16	570	685	−115	21	
11	Hull Kingston Rovers	27	10	0	17	491	723	−232	20	
12	Salford City Reds (R)	27	6	1	20	475	874	−399	13	Relegation to National League One

Source: Rugby League Project
Rules for classification: 1) Points; 2) Points difference; 3) Number of points scored;
(C) Champions; (L) League Leaders' Shield Winners; (R) Relegated

== 2007 Season players ==
Squad no	Player	Apps	Tries	Goals	Drop Goals	Pts
1	Paul Reilly	23	9	0	0	36
2	Martin Aspinwall	12	3	0	0	12
3	Jamahl Lolesi	26	10	0	0	40
4	Kevin Brown	27	7	0	0	28
5	Shane Elford	10	4	0	0	16
6	Chris Thorman	25	11	96	2	238
7	Robbie Paul	24	3	0	0	12
8	Eorl Crabtree	27	3	0	0	12
9	Brad Drew	27	5	12	0	44
10	John Skandalis	27	1	0	0	4
11	Chris Nero	28	9	0	0	36
12	Andy Raleigh	26	3	0	0	12
13	Stephen Wild	28	15	0	0	60
14	Stuart Jones	23	5	0	0	20
15	Paul Jackson	18	1	0	0	4
16	Keith Mason	26	0	0	0	0
18	Darrell Griffin	26	1	0	0	4
19	Ryan Hudson	28	6	0	0	24
20	Steve Snitch	20	5	0	0	20
21	Mat Gardner	11	2	0	0	8
22	Tom Hemingway	2	0	2	0	4
23	Simon George	0	0	0	0	0
24	Rod Jensen	12	6	0	0	24
25	Leroy Cudjoe	0	0	0	0	0
27	Michael Lawrence	1	0	0	0	0

== 2007 Signings ==
=== Transfers in ===
Player	Previous club
Jamahl Lolesi	Wests Tigers
John Skandalis	Wests Tigers
Shane Elford	Wests Tigers
Ryan Hudson	Bradford Bulls
Darrell Griffin	Wakefield Trinity Wildcats
Rod Jensen	North Queensland Cowboys
Michael Lawrence	Academy product
Leroy Cudjoe	Academy product
Simon George	Academy product

=== Transfers out ===
Player	To
Michael De Vere	Retired
Paul March	Wakefield Trinity Wildcats
James Evans	Bradford Bulls
Stuart Donlan	Castleford Tigers
Jim Gannon	Hull Kingston Rovers
Paul Smith	Halifax
Wayne McDonald	Released
Jon Grayshon	Harlequins RL
Albert Torrens	Released
Bolu Fagborun	Rochdale Hornets
