= 2009 Huddersfield Giants season =

- Super League Rank: 10th
- Challenge Cup: Fifth round
← 2008	List of seasons	2010 →

2009 was the Huddersfield Giants' 146th year in rugby league, entering their eleventh Super League season and the 2009 Challenge Cup.

== Results ==
=== Pre-season ===
W Win D Draw L Loss

Pre-season results
Date	Versus	H/A	Venue	Result	Score	Tries	Goals	Attendance	Report
4 January	Halifax	A	Shay Stadium	L	18–32			2,352	
25 January	Wigan Warriors	H	Galpharm Stadium	L	24–28			3,452	
1 February	Batley Bulldogs	A	Mount Pleasant	W	40–6				

=== Super League ===
==== Table ====
Pos	Team	Pld	W	D	L	PF	PA	PD	Pts	Qualification
1	Leeds Rhinos (L, C)	27	21	0	6	805	453	+352	42	Play-offs
2	St Helens	27	19	0	8	733	466	+267	38	Play-offs
3	Huddersfield Giants	27	18	0	9	690	416	+274	36	Play-offs
4	Hull Kingston Rovers	27	17	1	9	650	516	+134	35	Play-offs
5	Wakefield Trinity Wildcats	27	16	0	11	685	609	+76	32	Play-offs
6	Wigan Warriors	27	15	0	12	659	551	+108	30	Play-offs
7	Castleford Tigers	27	14	0	13	645	702	−57	28	Play-offs
8	Catalans Dragons	27	13	0	14	613	660	−47	26	Play-offs
9	Bradford Bulls	27	12	1	14	653	668	−15	25	
10	Warrington Wolves	27	12	0	15	649	705	−56	24	
11	Harlequins	27	11	0	16	591	691	−100	22	
12	Hull F.C.	27	10	0	17	502	623	−121	20	
13	Salford City Reds	27	7	0	20	456	754	−298	14	
14	Celtic Crusaders	27	3	0	24	357	874	−517	6	

Source: Rugby League Project
Rules for classification: 1) Points; 2) Points difference; 3) Number of points scored;
(C) Champions; (L) League Leaders' Shield Winners

==== Super League results ====
W Win D Draw L Loss

Super League results
Date	Round	Versus	H/A	Venue	Result	Score	Tries	Goals	Attendance	Report
14 February	1	Catalans Dragons	A	Stade Gilbert Brutus	W	30–8			7,520	Super League
22 February	2	St. Helens	H	Galpharm Stadium	L	6–23			11,338	Super League
27 February	3	Bradford Bulls	A	Grattan Stadium	W	16–12			10,186	Super League
6 March	4	Hull F.C.	H	Galpharm Stadium	L	20–24			10,459	RLP
14 March	5	Castleford Tigers	A	The Jungle	W	26–24			6,572	RLP
22 March	6	Harlequins RL	H	Galpharm Stadium	W	46–6			6,356	Super League
27 March	7	Wigan Warriors	A	JJB Stadium	W	22–8			11,670	Super League
10 April	8	Celtic Crusaders	H	Galpharm Stadium	W	30–10			6,407	Super League
13 April	9	Hull Kingston Rovers	A	Craven Park	W	30–8			8,731	Super League
18 April	10	Leeds Rhinos	H	Galpharm Stadium	L	6–34			11,593	Super League
26 April	11	Warrington Wolves	A	Halliwell Jones Stadium	L	18–40			8,007	Super League
3 May	12	Celtic Crusaders	N	Murrayfield Stadium	W	40–16			30,122	Super League
17 May	13	Salford City Reds	H	Galpharm Stadium	L	4–24			6,903	Super League
24 May	14	Wakefield Trinity Wildcats	A	Belle Vue	W	54–6			5,034	Super League
5 June	15	Hull Kingston Rovers	H	Galpharm Stadium	W	22–6			6,346	RLP
14 June	16	Leeds Rhinos	A	Headingley Stadium	L	12–20			14,934	BBC
19 June	17	Castleford Tigers	H	Galpharm Stadium	L	6–13			6,010	Super League
26 June	18	Salford City Reds	A	The Willows	W	34–10			3,721	Super League
5 July	19	Wakefield Trinity Wildcats	H	Galpharm Stadium	W	30–14			7,486	Super League
11 July	20	Harlequins RL	A	Twickenham Stoop	W	32–16			3,916	Super League
19 July	21	Warrington Wolves	H	Galpharm Stadium	W	28–10			7,107	Super League
26 July	22	Catalans Dragons	H	Galpharm Stadium	W	36–12			5,823	RLP
31 July	23	Hull F.C.	A	KC Stadium	W	24–0			11,191	Super League
16 August	24	Bradford Bulls	H	Galpharm Stadium	L	18–28			7,982	Super League
21 August	25	St. Helens	A	GPW Recruitment Stadium	L	10–12			8,708	Super League
5 September	26	Celtic Crusaders	A	Brewery Field	W	42–16			1,988	Super League
13 September	27	Wigan Warriors	H	Galpharm Stadium	W	48–16			8,988	RLP

==== Play-offs ====
Play-off results
Date	Round	Versus	H/A	Venue	Result	Score	Tries	Goals	Attendance	Report
19 September	Qualifying play-offs	St. Helens	A	GPW Recruitment Stadium	L	2–15			6,157	RLP
25 September	Preliminary Semi-finals	Catalans Dragons	H	Galpharm Stadium	L	6–16			4,263	RLP

=== Challenge Cup ===
W Win L Loss

Challenge Cup results
Date	Round	Versus	H/A	Venue	Result	Score	Tries	Goals	Attendance	Report
4 April	4	Harlequins RL	A	Twickenham Stoop	W	42–16			2,500	BBC
10 May	5	Rochdale Hornets	H	Galpharm Stadium	W	38–12			2,859	BBC
31 May	Quarter-finals	Castleford Tigers	H	Galpharm Stadium	W	16–14			6,359	BBC
9 August	Semi-finals	St. Helens	N	Halliwell Jones Stadium	W	24–14			10,638	BBC
29 August	Final	Warrington Wolves	N	Wembley Stadium	L	24–14			76,560	RLP

== Players ==
=== Squad ===
Number	Player	Position	Previous club
1	Brett Hodgson	FB	Wests Tigers
2	Martin Aspinwall	W	Wigan Warriors
3	Kevin Brown	C	Wigan Warriors
4	Paul Whatuira	C	Wests Tigers
5	David Hodgson	W	Salford City Reds
6	Liam Fulton	SO	Wests Tigers
7	Luke Robinson	SH	Salford City Reds
8	Eorl Crabtree	P	Huddersfield Giants
9	David Faiumu	HK	North Queensland Cowboys
10	Darrell Griffin	P	Wakefield Trinity Wildcats
11	Jamahl Lolesi	SR	Wests Tigers
12	Andy Raleigh	SR	Hull Kingston Rovers
13	Stephen Wild	LF	Wigan Warriors
14	Simon Finnigan	SR	Bradford Bulls
15	Paul Jackson	P	Castleford Tigers
16	Keith Mason	P	St. Helens
17	Michael Korkidas	P	Castleford Tigers
18	Danny Kirmond	SR	Featherstone Rovers
19	Michael Lawrence	W	Huddersfield Giants
20	Scott Moore	HK	St. Helens
21	Leroy Cudjoe	FB	Huddersfield Giants
22	Jermaine McGillvary	W	Huddersfield Giants
23	Joe Walsh	SR	Harlequins
24	Shaun Lunt	HK	Workington Town
25	Chris Lawson	P	Huddersfield Giants
26	Tom Hemingway	SH	Huddersfield Giants
27	Richard Lopag	W	Huddersfield Giants
28	Josh Griffin	C	Wakefield Trinity Wildcats
29	Keale Carlile	HK	Bradford Bulls
30	Larne Patrick	SR	Bradford Bulls

=== Transfers ===
==== Gains ====
List of players joining Huddersfield
Player	Club	Contract	Date
Brett Hodgson	Wests Tigers		August 2008
Scott Moore	Castleford Tigers		August 2008
Simon Finnigan	Bradford Bulls		September 2008
Josh Griffin	Wakefield Trinity Wildcats		October 2008
Michael Korkidas	Castleford Tigers		November 2008
Greg McNally	Whitehaven		November 2008
Larne Patrick	Free agent		December 2008
Shaun Lunt	Workington Town		December 2008
Joe Walsh	Harlequins RL		November 2008
Keale Carlile	Bradford Bulls		December 2008
Liam Fulton	Wests Tigers		March 2009

==== Losses ====
List of players leaving Huddersfield
Player	Club	Contract	Date
Rod Jensen	Retired		August 2008
Ryan Hudson	Castleford Tigers		September 2008
Stuart Jones	Castleford Tigers		September 2008
Chris Thorman	Hull		August 2008
Steve Snitch	Wakefield Trinity Wildcats		August 2008
Shane Elford	Penrith Panthers		October 2008
John Skandalis	Retired		October 2008
Gregg McNally	Whitehaven		December 2008
