= 2010 Huddersfield Giants season =

- Super League XV Rank: 5th
- Play-off result: Lost in qualifying semi-finals
- Challenge Cup: Fifth round

Team information
- Chairman: Ken Davy
- Head coach: Nathan Brown
- Captain: Brett Hodgson
- Stadium: Galpharm Stadium
← 2009	List of seasons	2011 →

In the 2010 rugby league season, Huddersfield Giants competed in Super League XV and the 2010 Challenge Cup.

== Results ==
=== Super League ===
==== Table ====
Pos	Team	Pld	W	D	L	PF	PA	PD	Pts	Qualification
1	Wigan Warriors (L, C)	27	22	0	5	922	411	+511	44	Play-offs
2	St Helens	27	20	0	7	946	547	+399	40	Play-offs
3	Warrington Wolves	27	20	0	7	885	488	+397	40	Play-offs
4	Leeds Rhinos	27	17	1	9	725	561	+164	35	Play-offs
5	Huddersfield Giants	27	16	1	10	758	439	+319	33	Play-offs
6	Hull F.C.	27	16	0	11	569	584	−15	32	Play-offs
7	Hull Kingston Rovers	27	14	1	12	653	632	+21	29	Play-offs
8	Celtic Crusaders	27	12	0	15	547	732	−185	24	Play-offs
9	Castleford Tigers	27	11	0	16	648	766	−118	22	
10	Bradford Bulls	27	9	1	17	528	728	−200	19	
11	Wakefield Trinity Wildcats	27	9	0	18	539	741	−202	18	
12	Salford City Reds	27	8	0	19	448	857	−409	16	
13	Harlequins	27	7	0	20	494	838	−344	14	
14	Catalans Dragons	27	6	0	21	409	747	−338	12	

Source: Rugby League Project
Rules for classification: 1) Points; 2) Points difference; 3) Number of points scored;
(C) Champions; (L) League Leaders' Shield Winners

==== Super League results ====
W Win D Draw L Loss

Super League results
Date	Round	Versus	H/A	Venue	Result	Score	Tries	Goals	Attendance	Report
5 February	1	Bradford Bulls	H	Galpharm Stadium	W	24–12			9,774	RLP
12 February	2	Hull F.C.	A	KC Stadium	L	6–14			14,520	RLP
21 February	3	Hull Kingston Rovers	A	"New" Craven Park	W	30–0			7,575	RLP
28 February	4	Warrington Wolves	H	Galpharm Stadium	L	10–14			8,567	RLP
6 March	5	Wakefield Trinity Wildcats	A	Hearwell Stadium	W	52–0			5,237	RLP
14 March	6	Leeds Rhinos	H	Galpharm Stadium	W	26–20			10,116	RLP
20 March	7	Harlequins	A	Twickenham Stoop	W	32–18			2,624	RLP
28 March	8	St Helens	H	Galpharm Stadium	L	6–24			9,648	RLP
2 April	9	Catalans Dragons	H	Galpharm Stadium	W	48–6			5,926	RLP
5 April	10	Salford City Reds	A	The Willows	L	18–30			4,014	RLP
9 April	11	Castleford Tigers	H	Galpharm Stadium	W	24–0			5,932	RLP
25 April	12	Crusaders	A	Racecourse Ground	W	38–10			4,127	RLP
2 May	13	Wigan Warriors	N	Murrayfield Stadium	L	10–28			25,401	RLP
16 May	14	Wigan Warriors	H	Galpharm Stadium	L	30–38			8,390	RLP
23 May	15	Warrington Wolves	A	Halliwell Jones Stadium	L	20–36			11,087	RLP
6 June	16	Bradford Bulls	A	Grattan Stadium, Odsal	W	52–6			8,156	RLP
11 June	17	St Helens	A	The GPW Recruitment Stadium	L	22–30			9.034	RLP
20 June	18	Hull F.C.	H	Galpharm Stadium	W	32–18			7,939	RLP
25 June	19	Hull Kingston Rovers	H	Galpharm Stadium	D	16–16			6,304	RLP
4 July	20	Castleford Tigers	A	The Jungle	L	18–44			5,925	RLP
11 July	21	Crusaders	H	Galpharm Stadium	W	30–12			5,339	RLP
16 July	22	Leeds Rhinos	A	Headingley Carnegie Stadium	L	20–21			15,070	RLP
25 July	23	Harlequins	H	Galpharm Stadium	W	40–4			5,366	RLP
1 August	24	Wakefield Trinity Wildcats	H	Galpharm Stadium	W	58–6			6,055	RLP
15 August	25	Wigan Warriors	A	DW Stadium	W	18–16			13,619	RLP
22 August	26	Salford City Reds	H	Galpharm Stadium	W	52–4			6,697	RLP
4 September	27	Catalans Dragons	A	Stade Gilbert Brutus	W	26–12			5,708	RLP

==== Play-offs ====
Play-off results
Date	Round	Versus	H/A	Venue	Result	Score	Tries	Goals	Attendance	Report
11 September	Eliminators	Crusaders	H	Galpharm Stadium	W	18–12			5,869	RLP
18 September	Preliminary semi-finals	Warrington Wolves	A	Halliwell Jones Stadium	W	34–22			8,050	RLP
24 September	Qualifying semi-finals	St Helens	A	The GPW Recruitment Stadium	L	22–42			13,510	RLP

=== Challenge Cup ===
W Win L Loss

Challenge Cup results
Date	Round	Versus	H/A	Venue	Result	Score	Tries	Goals	Attendance	Report
18 April	4	Hull Kingston Rovers	H	Galpharm Stadium	W	40–12			7,241	RLP
9 May	5	Warrington Wolves	H	Galpharm Stadium	L	4–60			6,641	RLP

== Players ==
=== Squad ===
Number	Player	Position
1	Brett Hodgson	Fullback
2	Leroy Cudjoe	Wing, Centre, Fullback
3	Jamahl Lolesi	Centre, Wing
4	Paul Whatuira	Centre
5	David Hodgson	Wing
6	Kevin Brown	Stand-off
7	Luke Robinson	Scrum-half, Hooker
8	Eorl Crabtree	Prop
9	Shaun Lunt	Hooker
10	Keith Mason	Prop
11	Lee Gilmour	Second-row, Hooker, Lock
12	David Fa'alogo	Second-row
13	Stephen Wild	Centre, Second-row, Lock
14	Simon Finnigan	Second-row
15	Andy Raleigh	Prop
16	Darrell Griffin	Prop
17	Danny Kirmond	Second-row
18	Brad Drew	Hooker
19	Michael Lawrence	Centre
20	David Faiumu	Lock
21	Scott Grix	Fullback
22	Martin Aspinwall	Second-row, Lock
23	Larne Patrick	Second-row
27	Jermaine McGillvary	Wing
30	Adam Walker	Second-row
34	Danny Brough	Scrum-half, Hooker

=== Transfers ===
==== In ====
List of players joining Huddersfield
Name	Signed from	Contract	Date
Brad Drew	Wakefield Trinity Wildcats	1 year	September 2009
Scott Grix	Wakefield Trinity Wildcats	2 years	October 2009
Kyle Wood	Sheffield Eagles	3 years	October 2009
David Fa'alogo	South Sydney Rabbitohs	4 years	May 2009
Lee Gilmour	St. Helens	2 years	July 2009
Danny Brough	Wakefield Trinity Wildcats	4 ½ years	March 2010

==== Out ====
List of players leaving Huddersfield
Name	Signed for	Fee	Date
Liam Fulton	Wests Tigers	Loan return	October 2009
Thomas Hemingway	Blackpool Panthers	Free Agent	October 2009
Richard Lopag	Castleford TigersAcademy	Free Agent	October 2009
Chris Lawson		Free agent	October 2009
Joe Walsh	Sheffield Eagles	Free Agent	October 2009
Paul Jackson	Castleford Tigers	Free Agent	October 2009
Scott Moore	St. Helens	Loan return	October 2009
Michael Korkidas	Wakefield Trinity Wildcats	Loan	October 2009
Kyle Wood	Batley Bulldogs	Loan	November 2009
Josh Griffin	Batley Bulldogs	Loan	November 2009
Alex Brown	Batley Bulldogs	Loan	November 2009
Danny Kirmond	Wakefield Trinity Wildcats	Loan	March 2010
Kyle Wood	Castleford Tigers	Loan	May 2010
