= Shane Elford =

Australian rugby league footballer

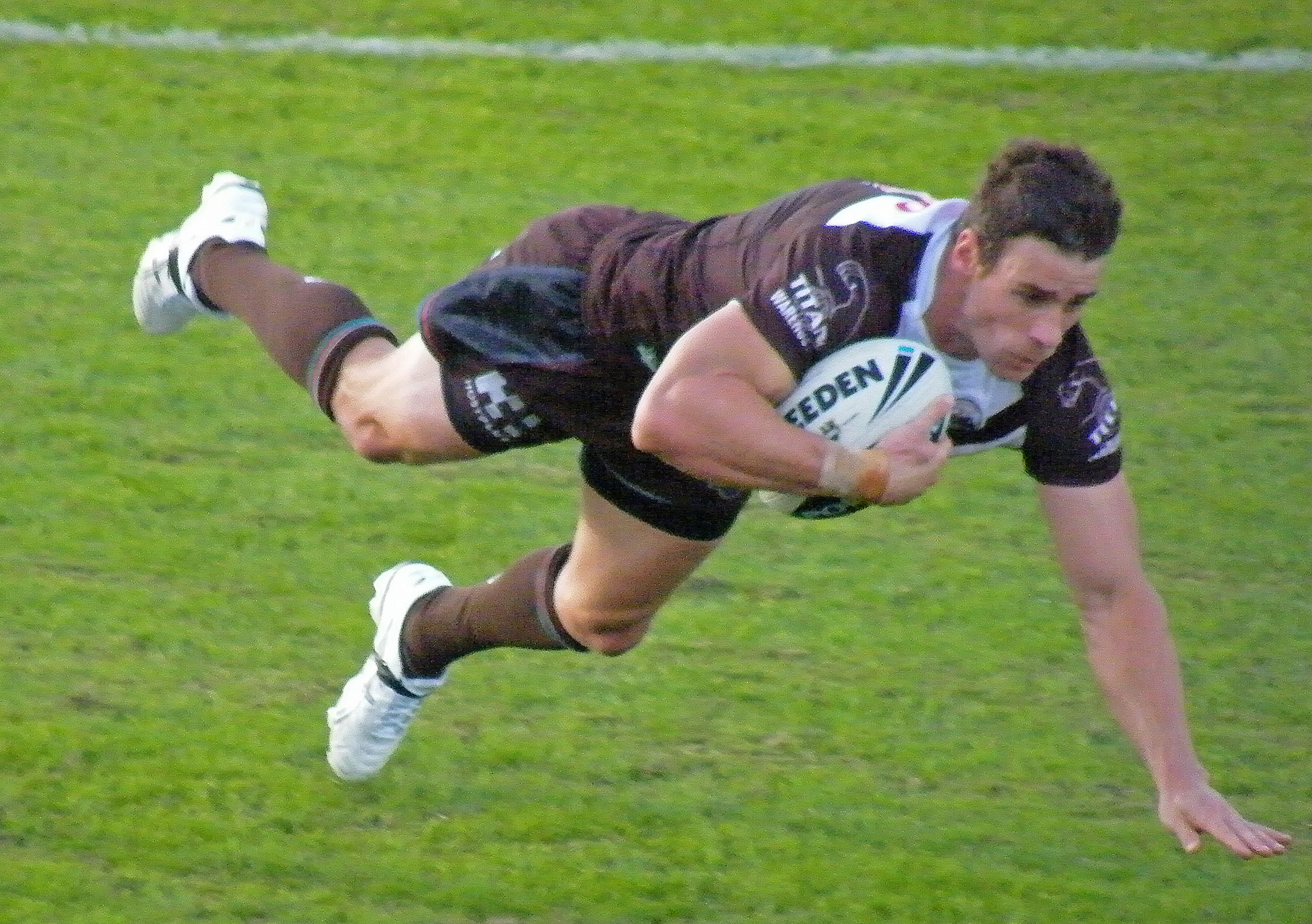

Personal information
- Born: 28 December 1977 (age 48) Penrith, New South Wales, Australia

Playing information
- Height: 190 cm (6 ft 3 in)
- Weight: 97 kg (15 st 4 lb)
- Position: Centre, Wing, Fullback
Club
Years	Team	Pld	T	G	FG	P
1997–03	Penrith Panthers	69	23	0	0	92
2004–06	Wests Tigers	59	18	0	0	72
2007–08	Huddersfield Giants	30	9	0	0	36
2009–10	Penrith Panthers	20	8	0	0	32
	Total	178	58	0	0	232

Shane Elford (born 28 December 1977), is an Australian former professional rugby league footballer who played as a winger and centre in the 1990s and 2000s.

He played in the National Rugby League for Sydney clubs, Penrith and Wests Tigers (with whom he won the 2005 Premiership), mostly at centre. Elford also played in the Super League for English club the Huddersfield Giants.

== Playing career ==
Elford was born in Penrith, New South Wales and would go on to play for Penrith's NRL team. His junior club was St Marys and he made his first grade debut in round 21, for Penrith against Canberra at Canberra Stadium on 2 August 1998. He missed Penrith's 2003 NRL grand final-winning team.

Joining Wests Tigers from 2004, Elford was a member of the 2005 NRL Grand Final-winning team, playing at centre in their 30–16 win over the North Queensland Cowboys. Despite an announcement that Elford would be joining the South Sydney Rabbitohs from 2006, he remained with the club for another year.

Following injuries to Benji Marshall and Paul Whatuira during the 2006 season, Elford was trialled at five-eighth during rounds 21 to 26. His first assignment was handling Brisbane Broncos captain Darren Lockyer. The Tigers won that match 20–6 and were the third-last club to beat the eventual premiers before the finals. This was seen as a massive upset as the Tigers were without Marshall, Whatuira and captain Brett Hodgson for the remainder of the 2006 season, and the Broncos were at full strength.

At the end of 2006, Elford signed a three-year contract with English club Huddersfield, saying he was influenced by the signing of former team-mate John Skandalis and the recommendation of Brad Drew.

Elford signed a one-year deal with his former club Penrith after being released by Huddersfield in 2008. Elford said, "When I left the Tigers I never thought I'd come back to the NRL but once the offer from the Panthers came up, it was too good an opportunity to pass up."

In 2010, Elford scored four tries from his five appearances. In his last NRL game, Elford captained the Penrith team from the wing in the absence of State of Origin players Petero Civoniceva, Trent Waterhouse and Luke Lewis. A serious knee injury saw him play no further games.

== Post playing ==
After his retirement, Elford was employed by Penrith as a full-time Welfare Education Officer, helping young players adjust when they relocated after joining the club.

During the 2025 round 10 match where the Panthers went into Golden Point against the Cowboys, Elford was spotted wetting the ball with a drink bottle.
