= 2008 Challenge Cup =

Rugby league competition

2008 Carnegie Challenge Cup
- Duration: 9 Rounds
- Highest attendance: 82,821
- Broadcast partners: (United Kingdom) BBC Sport
- Winners: St. Helens
- Runners-up: Hull
- Biggest home win: Wigan 106-8; Whitehaven
- Biggest away win: Workington Town 12-68; Hull Kingston Rovers
- Lance Todd Trophy: Paul Wellens

The 2008 Challenge Cup (also known as the Carnegie Challenge Cup for sponsorship reasons) was the 107th staging of the Challenge Cup most prestigious knock-out competition in the world of Rugby league, featuring teams from across Europe, including England, Scotland, Wales, France and Russia. It began in February 2008.

Teams from the National League were given byes to round three, and teams from the Super League entered in round four. Teams from outside the UK were introduced at various stages.

St. Helens successfully defended their title after beating Hull F.C. 28 - 16 in the final.

== Round 1 ==
(week ending 3 February, 3 fixtures played Saturday 9 February (indicated with *), 1 on Saturday 16 February (indicated with **))

Tie no	Home team	Score	Away team
1	Askham	12 – 20	West Bowling
2*	Bradford Dudley Hill	72 – 0	Dewsbury Celtic
3	Bramley Buffaloes	24 – 16	Castleford Panthers
4	British Army	34 – 12	Thatto Heath
5	Castleford Lock Lane	18 – 32	Royal Navy
6*	Drighlington	10 – 20	Bank Quay Bulls
7	East Hull	54 – 6	Royal Air Force
8*	Eastmoor	10 – 23	Queens
9	Eccles & Salford	10 – 28	Leigh East
10	Ellenbrough Rangers	17 – 1	Saddleworth Rangers
11	Hull Wyke	18 – 40	York Acorn
12	Ince Rose Bridge	28 – 6 ***	Hunslet Old Boys
13	Leigh Miners Rangers	24 – 18	Halton Simms Cross
14	Mayfield	48 – 4	Crosfields
15	Millom	38 – 0	Milford Marlins
16	Normanton Knights	38 – 8	Edinburgh Eagles
17	Oulton Raiders	48 – 4	Oldham St Annes
18	Seaton Rangers	6 – 38	Featherstone Lions
19	Siddal	62 – 6	Egremont Rangers
20	Skirlaugh	46 – 14	Waterhead
21	St Albans	16 – 42	Hull Dockers
22	St Marys	22 – 30	Warrington Wizards
23	Stanningley	16 – 10	Shaw Cross Sharks
24	Thornhill	20 – 26	Leeds Met
25	Wath Brow Hornets	58 – 4	Heworth
26*	West Hull	48 – 14	Widnes St Maries
27	Wigan St Patricks	44 – 14	Ovenden

*** - Match abandoned after Hunslet Old Boys had 4 players sent off. Hunslet Old Boys were subsequently thrown out of the competition.

== Round 2 ==
(weekend of 23 – 24 February)

Russian team Vereya joined in this round. Vereya were runners-up in the Russian Championship to Lokomotiv Moscow. Lokomotiv Moscow joined in the third round.

Tie no	Home team	Score	Away team
1	Bank Quay Bulls	29 – 0	Millom
2	Bramley Buffaloes	16 – 26	Wigan St. Patricks
3	Hull Dockers	14 – 19	Skirlaugh
4	Ince Rose Bridge	25 – 26	British Army
5	Leeds Met Uni	20 – 8	Leigh East
6	Leigh Miners Rangers	64 – 12	Vereya
7	Normanton	18 – 38	East Hull
8	Oulton Raiders	18 – 14	West Hull
9	Royal Navy	6 – 36	Rochdale Mayfield
10	Siddal	6 – 17	Queens
11	Warrington Wizards	26 – 10	Stanningley
12	Wath Brow Hornets	8 – 6	Ellenborough Rangers
13	West Bowling	16 – 34	Featherstone Lions
14	York Acorn	14 – 6	Bradford Dudley Hill

== Round 3 ==
(weekend of 8 – 9 March)

The National Leagues teams, together with Lokomotiv Moscow, Pia, Lezignan and Toulouse joined in this round. Super League teams joined in Round 4.

Tie no	Home team	Score	Away team
1	Bank Quay Bulls	6 – 36	Hunslet
2	Batley	42 – 10	East Hull
3	Blackpool	16 – 23	Featherstone Rovers
4	British Army	10 – 56	Oldham
5	Celtic Crusaders	58 – 10	Lokomotiv Moscow
6	Gateshead Thunder	24 – 26	Pia
7	Keighley	14 – 17	Toulouse
8	Leeds Met Uni	16 – 44	Doncaster
9	Leigh	66 – 0	Featherstone Lions
10	Leigh Miners Rangers	14 – 40	Whitehaven
11	London Skolars	20 – 8	Queens
12	Rochdale Mayfield	10 – 30	Barrow
13	Oulton Raiders	24 – 54	Dewsbury
14	Rochdale Hornets	50 – 8	York Acorn
15	Salford	66 – 10	Warrington Wizards
16	Sheffield Eagles	22 – 37	Lezignan
17	Wath Brow Hornets	14 – 40	Swinton
18	Widnes	60 – 18	Skirlaugh
19	Wigan St. Patricks	14 – 50	Workington Town
20	York	12 – 34	Halifax

== Round 4 ==
(Weekend of 18 – 20 April)

Super League teams joined in Round 4. From Round 4 onwards, the competition was a straightforward knock-out, with no more teams joining.

Tie no	Home team	Score	Away team
1	Batley	12 – 26	Dewsbury
2	Leigh	16 – 28	Warrington
3	Workington Town	12 – 68	Hull Kingston Rovers
4	Harlequins	44 – 14	Castleford
5	Doncaster	12 – 38	Widnes
6	Featherstone Rovers	12 – 22	Catalans Dragons
7	Barrow	48 – 16	Hunslet
8	Salford	8 – 38	Wakefield Trinity
9	Leeds	38 – 16	Celtic Crusaders
10	Swinton	8 – 20	Oldham
11	Bradford	98 – 6	Toulouse Olympique
12	Halifax	24 – 42	Huddersfield
13	Whitehaven	46 – 6	Lézignan Sangliers
14	St. Helens	56 – 0	London Skolars
15	Rochdale Hornets	5 – 42	Hull F.C.
16	Wigan	74 – 4	Pia Donkeys

All fixtures taken from BBC Sport

== Round 5 ==
(weekend of 9 – 12 May)

Tie no	Home team	Score	Away team
1	Hull Kingston Rovers	42 – 22	Huddersfield
2	Barrow	6 – 58	Wakefield Trinity
3	Dewsbury	12 – 58	Oldham
4	Bradford	46 – 16	Catalans Dragons
5	Wigan	106 – 8	Whitehaven
6	Widnes	18 – 32*	Hull F.C.
7	Harlequins	26 – 36	Leeds
8	St. Helens	40 – 34	Warrington

== Quarter finals ==
1 June 2008

Bradford	16 – 22	Hull F.C.
Try: Tupou 54' c Sykes 78' m Goal: Harris (4)	(Preview)	Try: Sing 31' c, 43' c Byrne 39' c Goal: Tickle (5)

Odsal, Bradford
Referee: Steve Ganson

1 June 2008

Hull Kingston Rovers	18 – 24	St. Helens
Try: Cooke; Fitzhenry; Webster; Goal: Cooke (3)	(Preview)	Try: Talau; Fa'asavalu; Long; Gardner; Goal: Long (4)

Craven Park, Hull
Referee: Ashley Klein

31 May 2008

Leeds	23 – 16	Wigan
Try: Diskin 5' c Burrow 28' c Webb 57' c Donald 76' c Goal: Sinfield (3); Drop: Sinfield 80'	(Report)	Try: Calderwood 38' c T. Leuluai 66' c Goal: Richards (4)

Headingley, Leeds
Referee: Richard Silverwood

1 June 2008

Wakefield Trinity	46 – 4	Oldham
Try: Gleeson (2); Blanch; Wilkes; Drew; Rooney (2); Brough; Martin; Goal: Brough (5)	(Preview)	Try: Onyango

Belle Vue, Wakefield
Referee: Ben Thaler

== Semi finals ==
26 July 2008

Leeds	16 – 26	St. Helens

Kirklees Stadium, Huddersfield
Referee: Ashley Klein

27 July 2008

Wakefield Trinity	24 – 32	Hull F.C.

Keepmoat Stadium, Doncaster
Referee: Richard Silverwood

== Final ==
30 August 2008

St. Helens	28 – 16	Hull F.C.

Wembley Stadium, London

== UK Broadcasting rights ==
Selected matches were televised solely by the BBC.

Round	Live match	Date	BBC channel
Round 4	Harlequins 44 - 14 Castleford; Salford 8 - 38 Wakefield Trinity		BBC Two^{1}
Round 5	Hull Kingston Rovers 42 - 22 Huddesfield; St. Helens 40 - 34 Warrington		BBC Two^{1} BBC One
Quarter finals	Leeds 23 - 16 Wigan; Bradford 16 - 22 Hull	May 31, 2008; June 1, 2008	BBC One; BBC Two^{2}
Semi finals	Leeds 16 - 26 St. Helens; Wakefield Trinity 24 - 32 Hull	July 26, 2008; July 27, 2008	BBC One; BBC Two^{3}
Final	St. Helens 28 - 16 Hull	August 30, 2008	BBC One

^{1} Except East and Yorkshire.

^{2} Except East, Northern Ireland and Yorkshire.

^{3} Except Yorkshire.
