= 2004 European Nations Cup =

- Number of teams: 6
- Winner: England (14th title)
- Matches played: 7

Under the same format as the 2003 European Nations Cup, six nations participated in two groups of three, each playing a total of two games.

England were crowned European champions for the third successive time after they defeated Ireland in the final.

== Group 1 ==
=== Results ===
17 October

Wales	12 – 25	Ireland

Talbot Athletic Ground, Port Talbot
Attendance: 1,296
Referee: Ian Smith (England)

24 October

Scotland	30 – 22	Wales

Old Anniesland, Glasgow
Attendance: 1,047
Referee: Thierry Alibert (France)

29 October

Ireland	43 – 10	Scotland

Balreask Old, Dublin
Attendance: 600
Referee: Ashley Klein (Australia)

=== Final standings ===
Team	Played	Won	Drew	Lost	For	Against	Diff	Points
Ireland	2	2	0	0	68	22	+46	4
Scotland	2	1	0	1	40	65	−25	2
Wales	2	0	0	2	34	55	−21	0

Ireland advanced to the final.

== Group 2 ==
=== Results ===
16 October

Russia	10 – 58	France

Luzhniki Stadium, Moscow
Attendance: 2,000
Referee: Ashley Klein (Australia)

24 October

Russia	4 – 98	England

Luzhniki Stadium, Moscow
Attendance: 1,000
Referee: Jean-Pierre Boulagnon (France)

30 October

France	4 – 42	England

Parc des Sports, Avignon
Attendance: 4,000
Referee: Tim Mander (Australia)

=== Final standings ===
Team	Played	Won	Drew	Lost	For	Against	Diff	Points
England	2	2	0	0	140	8	+132	4
France	2	1	0	1	62	52	+10	2
Russia	2	0	0	2	14	156	−142	0

England advanced to the final.

== Final ==
Saturday, 8 November

England	36 – 12	Ireland
Tries; Paul Reilly (2); Rob Burrow; Mark Calderwood; Rob Parker; Nick Scruton; Goals; Rob Burrow (6/6)	Report; RLEF	Tries; David Bates; Barrie McDermott Goals; Pat Weisner (2/2)

Halliwell Jones Stadium, Warrington
Attendance: 3,582
Referee: Richard Frileux (France)
Player of the Match: Paul Reilly
