= Rod Jensen =

Australian rugby league footballer (born 1979)

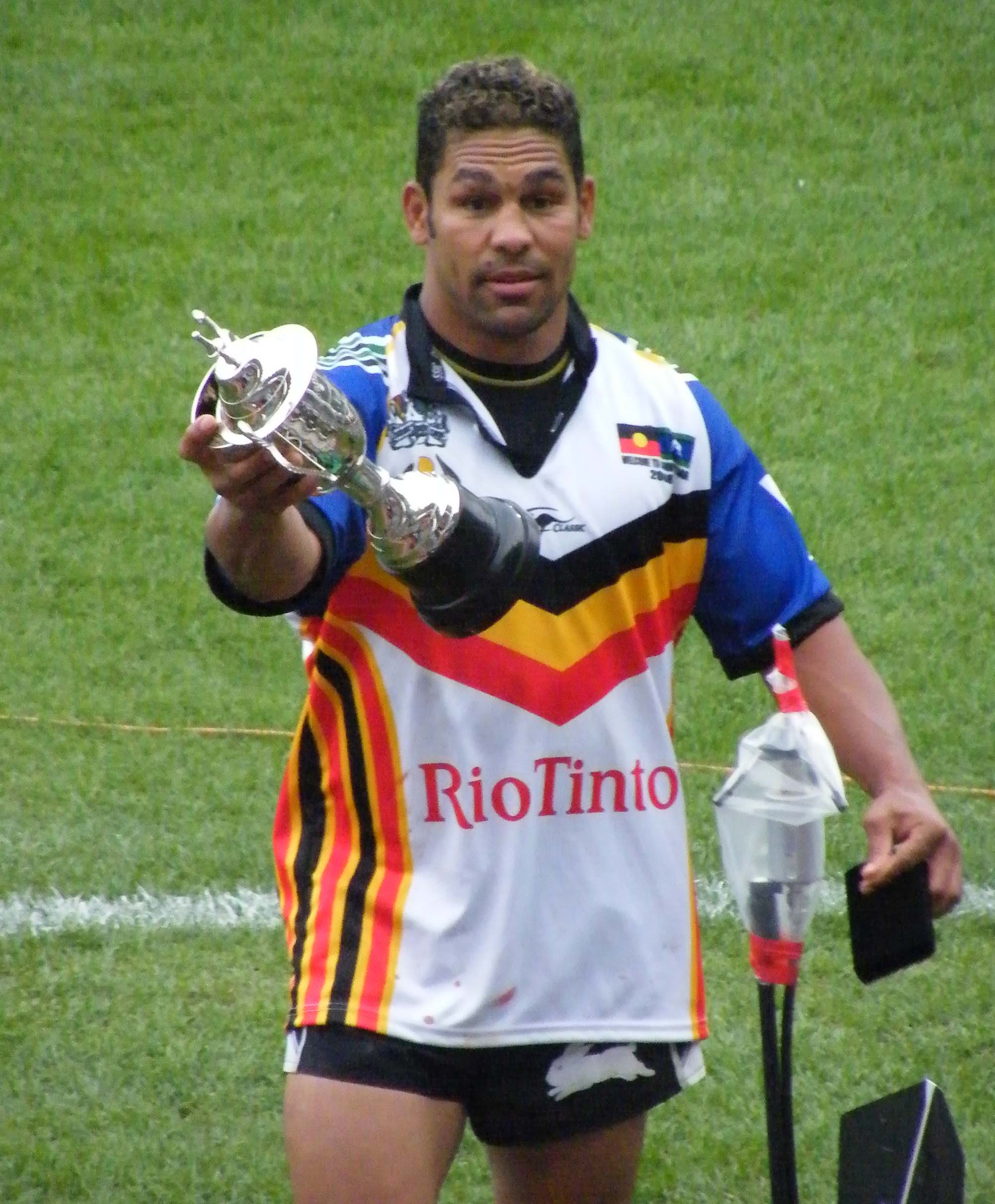

Personal information
- Full name: Rod Frederick Jensen
- Born: 19 January 1979 (age 47) Atherton, Queensland, Australia

Playing information
- Height: 178 cm (5 ft 10 in)
- Position: Wing, Centre
Club
| Years | Team | Pld | T | G | FG | P |
|---|---|---|---|---|---|---|
| 1998 | Adelaide Rams | 17 | 8 | 0 | 0 | 32 |
| 1999–03 | Canberra Raiders | 27 | 9 | 0 | 0 | 36 |
| 2004–07 | North Qld Cowboys | 58 | 19 | 0 | 0 | 76 |
| 2007–08 | Huddersfield Giants | 32 | 14 | 0 | 0 | 56 |
| | Total | 134 | 50 | 0 | 0 | 200 |
Representative
| Years | Team | Pld | T | G | FG | P |
| 2003 | NSW Residents | 1 | 1 | 0 | 0 | 4 |
| 2008 | Indigenous All Stars | | 2 | 0 | 0 | 8 |
| 2009 | Queensland Residents | 1 | 0 | 0 | 0 | 0 |

Rod Frederick Jensen (born 19 January 1979), nicknamed 'Rocket' Rod Jensen, is an Australian former professional rugby league footballer. Jensen had previously played for the Northern Pride in the Queensland Cup, in the United Kingdom for the Huddersfield Giants in the Super League, North Queensland Cowboys in the National Rugby League competition. He also played with the Canberra Raiders for 5 seasons. Jensen started his career at, the now defunct Australian Super League side, the Adelaide Rams in 1997.

== Early life ==
Jensen was born in Atherton, Queensland, Australia. He attended school at St Augustine's College.

== Playing career ==
Jensen played from the interchange bench in the North Queensland Cowboys' first ever grand final in 2005, which was lost to the Wests Tigers.

In May 2007, Jensen joined Super League club Huddersfield Giants on deal on a two-and-half-year contract. He was released by the club before the start of the 2009 season and returned to Australia.

Jensen scored 19 tries for the Northern Pride in the Queensland Cup before his retirement following the conclusion of the 2009 season. Jensen came out of retirement to rejoin the Northern Pride halfway through the 2010 season where the club went on to win the Queensland Cup premiership. He continued with the Northern Pride club for the 2011 and 2012 season before leaving to take up a position with Mareeba Gladiators.

== Post-playing career ==
Rod Jensen is currently CEO of the Northern Pride club. Jensen is a qualified Teacher and graduated from James Cook University of North Queensland in 2005.

Jensen ran as a candidate in the 2022 Australian federal election to represent the Division of Leichhardt in Far North Queensland. He ran as a candidate for the Katter's Australian Party.
