= Luke Robinson (rugby league) =

English rugby league coach and former England international rugby league footballer

Luke "Robocop" Robinson
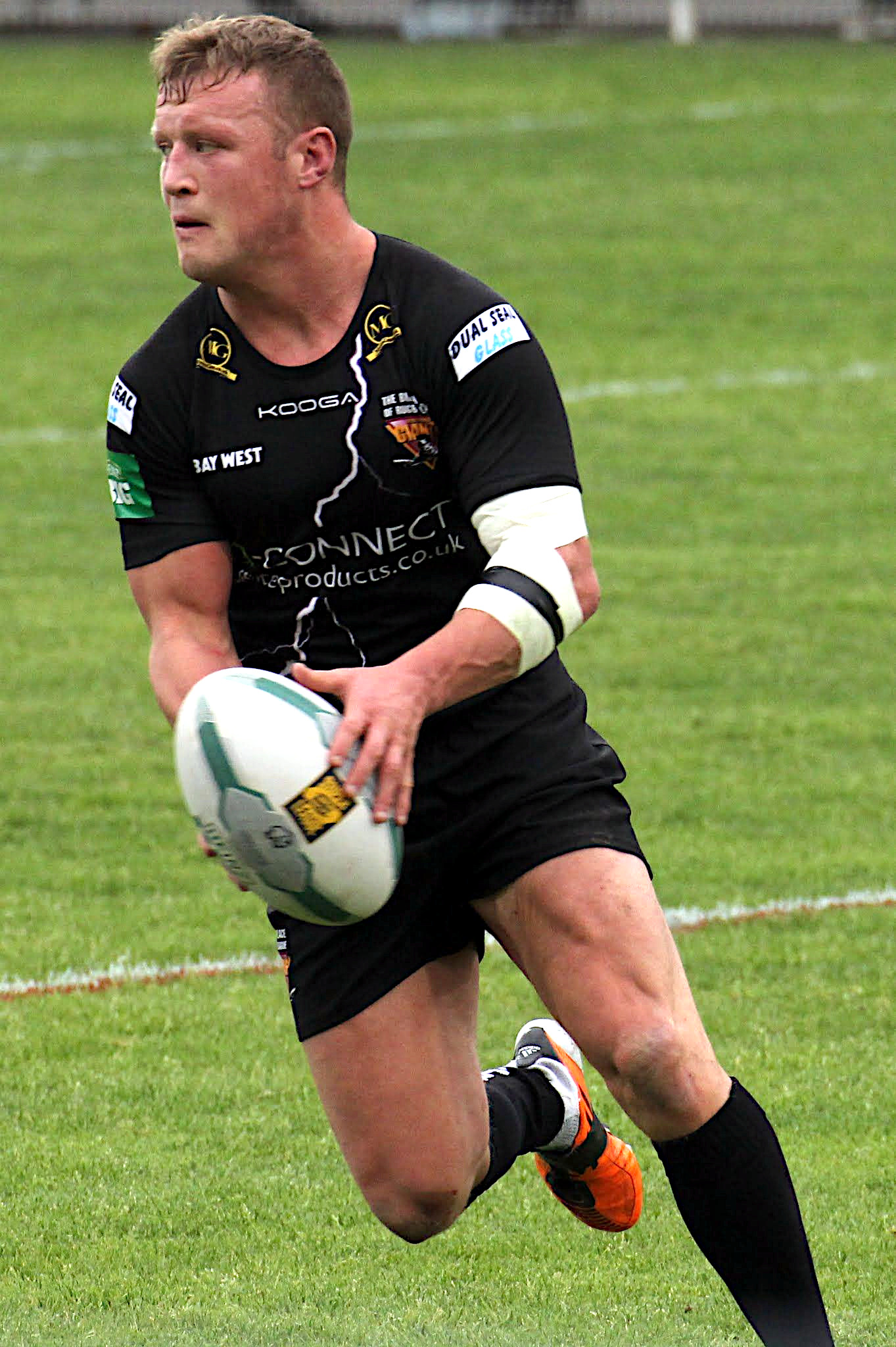

Personal information
- Full name: Luke Joe Robinson
- Born: 25 July 1984 (age 42) Halifax, West Yorkshire, England
- Height: 5 ft 6 in (1.68 m)
- Weight: 12 st 8 lb (80 kg)

Playing information
- Position: Scrum-half, Hooker
Club
Years	Team	Pld	T	G	FG	P
2002–05	Wigan Warriors	44	11	7	0	58
2004(loan)	→ Castleford Tigers	10	4	3	0	22
2005–07	Salford City Reds	86	34	9	1	155
2008–15	Huddersfield Giants	228	54	6	0	256
	Total	368	103	25	1	491
Representative
Years	Team	Pld	T	G	FG	P
2004–12	England	6	3	0	0	12

Coaching information
Club
Years	Team	Gms	W	D	L	W%
2020	Huddersfield Giants	8	3	0	5	38
2024–26	Huddersfield Giants	47	13	0	34	28
	Total	55	16	0	39	29
- Source: As of 14 August 2026

Luke Robinson (born 25 July 1984) is an English professional rugby league coach who is assistant coach of Castleford Tigers in the super league and a former professional rugby league footballer who played in the 2000s and 2010s.

An England international, he played in the Super League for the Wigan Warriors, Castleford Tigers, Salford City Reds and the Huddersfield Giants as a scrum-half and later in his career as a hooker.

== Background ==
Robinson was born in Halifax, West Yorkshire, England.

== Playing career ==
=== Wigan Warriors ===
Robinson signed for Wigan Warriors aged eleven, along with future first teamers Gareth Hock and Sean O'Loughlin. He was a find of Wigan's scout Eric Hawley. Robinson commented later: “Eric Hawley, who was the scout at that time, watched me at Siddal ARLFC and asked me if I wanted to come on a trial basis and have a look round and I decided to sign", he recalled. “It was under schoolboy terms, but they were binding to the club and to me. I came over once every two or three weeks for training, basically just to familiarise myself until I was sixteen and could move over."

Despite being born in Yorkshire, he had supported Wigan Warriors as a kid, his dad taking him to Wembley to watch during the club's glory years.

Robinson progressed through Wigan's scholarship and Academy systems before making his début for the first team at the age of seventeen during the 2002 Super League season. This year, he was also selected to play for the England Academy. He was an England schoolboys international. He played for the England Academy side, which was the first ever to beat the Aussie Schoolboys in December 2002.

During 2003, Robinson became a vital part of Wigan's first team squad, often sharing the scrum-half duties with Papua New Guinea star Adrian Lam. Lam picked up a knee injury during a crucial stage of the play-offs that season, leaving Robinson to take sole control the Wigan Warriors pack. Robinson, a supremely confident and exuberant young man, has been likened in style and manner to former Great Britain scrum-half Andy Gregory, and he does admit to sharing the characteristics of brashness and assertiveness famously associated with Gregory. "I think every scrum-half has got a bit of something in him," he said. "I'm only 5ft 6in and I've got to be bossing Craig Smith, who's 6ft and 17st."

Despite the comparisons with Gregory, he modelled himself on another Wigan Warriors legend in Adrian Lam. "I always liked Andy Gregory when I was really young but that was mainly through my dad talking about him," he said. "It was Adrian Lam really. You can't say much more about Adrian Lam, can you?" However, the England Academy international insists he "just wants to be Luke Robinson and be the best I can be."

Robinson played for the Wigan Warriors at scrum half back in the 2003 Super League Grand Final which was lost to the Bradford Bulls.

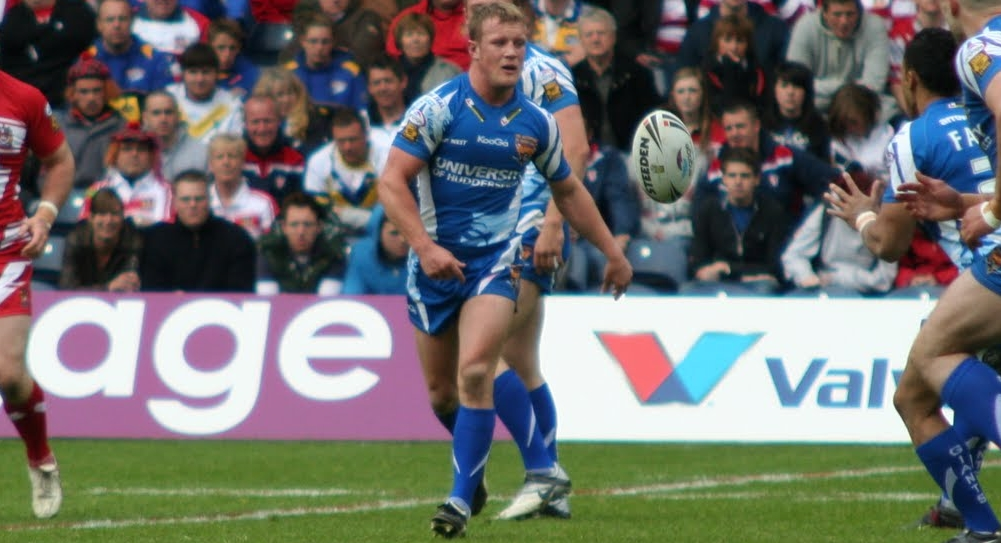
Robinson playing for Huddersfield in 2010

He was required again for the first team at the start of 2004 after a further injury to Adrian Lam, however he could not reproduce the form that had helped take Wigan Warriors to the final in the previous season.

=== Castleford Tigers (loan) ===
When Lam recovered Robinson was sent on loan to struggling Castleford Tigers. He spent two months at Castleford Tigers before another injury to Lam forced his recall, playing against the Tigers in his first match back at Wigan Warriors.

=== Salford City Reds ===
Robinson again struggled for form and was eventually allowed to leave Wigan, joining David Hodgson in signing a contract with Salford City Reds. After the deal was done Luke regained the type of form that had created the high hopes for his future, helping Wigan Warriors make it to the 2004 Final Eliminator at Headingley. However, his try was not enough to take the Wigan Warriors to the Grand Final. At the time, many fans were very concerned at the decision to let Robinson leave the club.

Robinson left Wigan and signed for the Salford City Reds, and was a regular in the first team at Scrum Half. In 2005 Luke scored eleven tries, seven goals, one field goals totalling fifty-nine points for the Salford City Reds. In 2006 he helped them to their highest ever finish (5th) in the Super League, and the first time the club made it to the play-offs.

=== Huddersfield Giants ===
He signed for Huddersfield Giants in September 2007, following Salford City Reds' relegation from Super League., and was an integral part of the Huddersfield sides who reached the 2009 cup final and who won the 2013 League Leaders Shield. While at Huddersfield, he was transformed into a hooker in his later years to brilliant effect.

== International ==
While at Huddersfield he played for England against the New Zealand Māori at the end of 2010. He played in the 2010 Rugby League Four Nations against New Zealand, Australia and Papua New Guinea games, scoring 2-tries.

On 9 February 2016 Robinson announced his retirement from the sport due to a hip injury. and was awarded a Testimonial.

== Coaching ==
=== Huddersfield Giants ===
In 2018, he led the Huddersfield Giants Academy team to a first ever grand final semi final, in the end, losing out to eventual champions Wigan.

After Simon Woolford left, Robinson was appointed Interim Head Coach of the Huddersfield Giants in September 2020.

He was announced as Head coach of Huddersfield replacing Ian Watson in September 2024. Under Robinson, Huddersfield would lose their opening nine games of the 2025 Super League season before earning their first victory over the campaign which was a 12–10 win over Hull F.C. at Magic Weekend. Robinson would eventually guided Huddersfield to a 10th-place finish on the table in the 2025 Super League season.

On 22 March 2026 it was reported that he had been sacked by Huddersfield after their winless start to the 2026 season.
