= John Skandalis =

Australian rugby league footballer

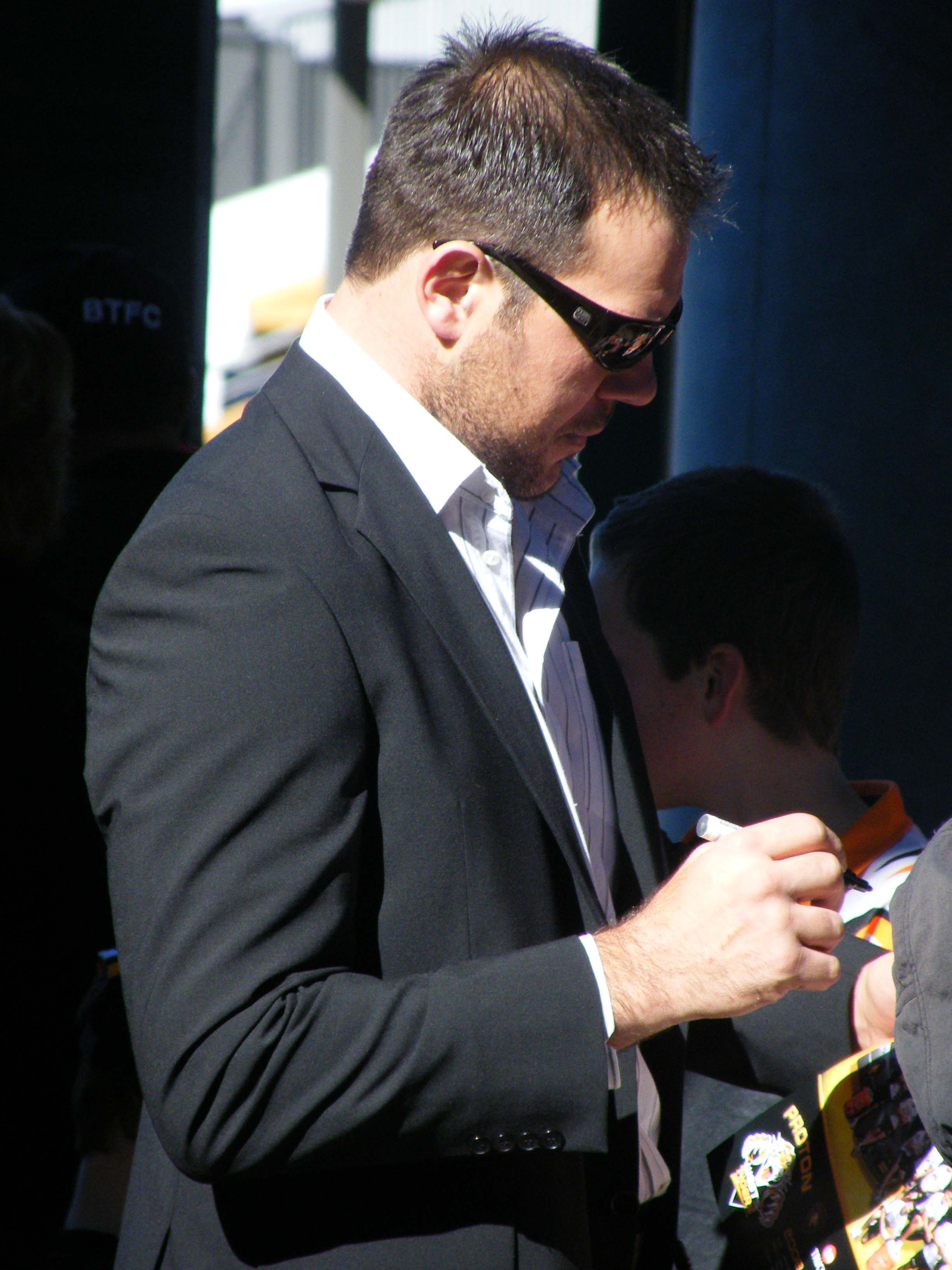

Personal information
- Born: 16 June 1976 (age 50) Sydney, New South Wales, Australia

Playing information
- Height: 190 cm (6 ft 3 in)
- Weight: 113 kg (17 st 11 lb)
- Position: Prop
Club
Years	Team	Pld	T	G	FG	P
1996–99	Western Suburbs	64	3	0	0	12
2000–06	Wests Tigers	166	15	0	0	60
2007–08	Huddersfield Giants	46	5	0	0	20
2009–10	Wests Tigers	19	1	0	0	4
	Total	295	24	0	0	96
Representative
Years	Team	Pld	T	G	FG	P
2002–06	City Origin	4	1	0	0	0

John Skandalis (born 16 June 1976) is an Australian former professional rugby league footballer who played as a prop in the 1990s, 2000s and 2010s.

He played for the Western Suburbs Magpies and for the Wests Tigers in two separate spells in the National Rugby League (NRL). Skandalis also played for the Huddersfield Giants in the Super League and City Origin between 2002 and 2006.

== Background ==
Skandalis was born in Sydney, New South Wales. The Skandalis family home in Lightning Ridge burnt down when John was six, causing the family to move to Ashfield, and later Minto. Skandalis' mother died when he was in his teens, leaving his father to raise Skandalis and his sisters. He was "taken in" by Josie McGuinness, the mother of Kevin and Ken McGuinness, who, he says, "treated him like [a] son."

== Playing career ==
Skandalis signed on for the Magpies in the early 1990s after playing out his junior years with the Minto Cobras, and attending Sarah Redfern High School. His first grade début came in round 9 of the 1996 season against the Penrith Panthers on 17 May. Coach Tommy Raudonikis said, "He got in a few brawls that night in his first game in first grade and I knew from that moment that this was a player who wasn't going to let anyone down. I knew from then on that if I gave him the opportunity, he was going to be great for me." He made 10 appearances that season, including the Magpies last ever finals appearance against Cronulla on 6 September.

A regular in the starting team in 1997, Skandalis scored 3 tries from his 20 appearances. He scored his first in the 24 May match against the Gold Coast Chargers, as they won 26–10. With the decline of the Magpies, Skandalis played in 34 games in the next 2 seasons, with only 5 being victories. He later said, "We used to get smashed every week and we didn't have the best team, but to be honest, those years at the start of my career really made me a tougher player and work that much harder. It helped to build up my mental toughness more than anything."

With the merger with the Balmain Tigers, Skandalis was one of the few former Magpies to join Wests Tigers. He scored their first try in their debut match on 6 February 2000, a 24-all draw against Brisbane at Campbelltown Stadium. Scoring 6 tries from his 24 games in 2000, it was the first of 7 consecutive seasons in which he played at least 22 games.

Skandalis was known for his workhorse attitude and his never-say-die approach to rugby league, and as the years progressed, his performances gradually caught the attention of representative selectors. This was seen in both the 2002 and 2004 seasons, where Skandalis was dually awarded with his first representative call-up for the City team in the annual City v. Country fixture. Skandalis was named the Wests Tigers' player of the year in 2002.

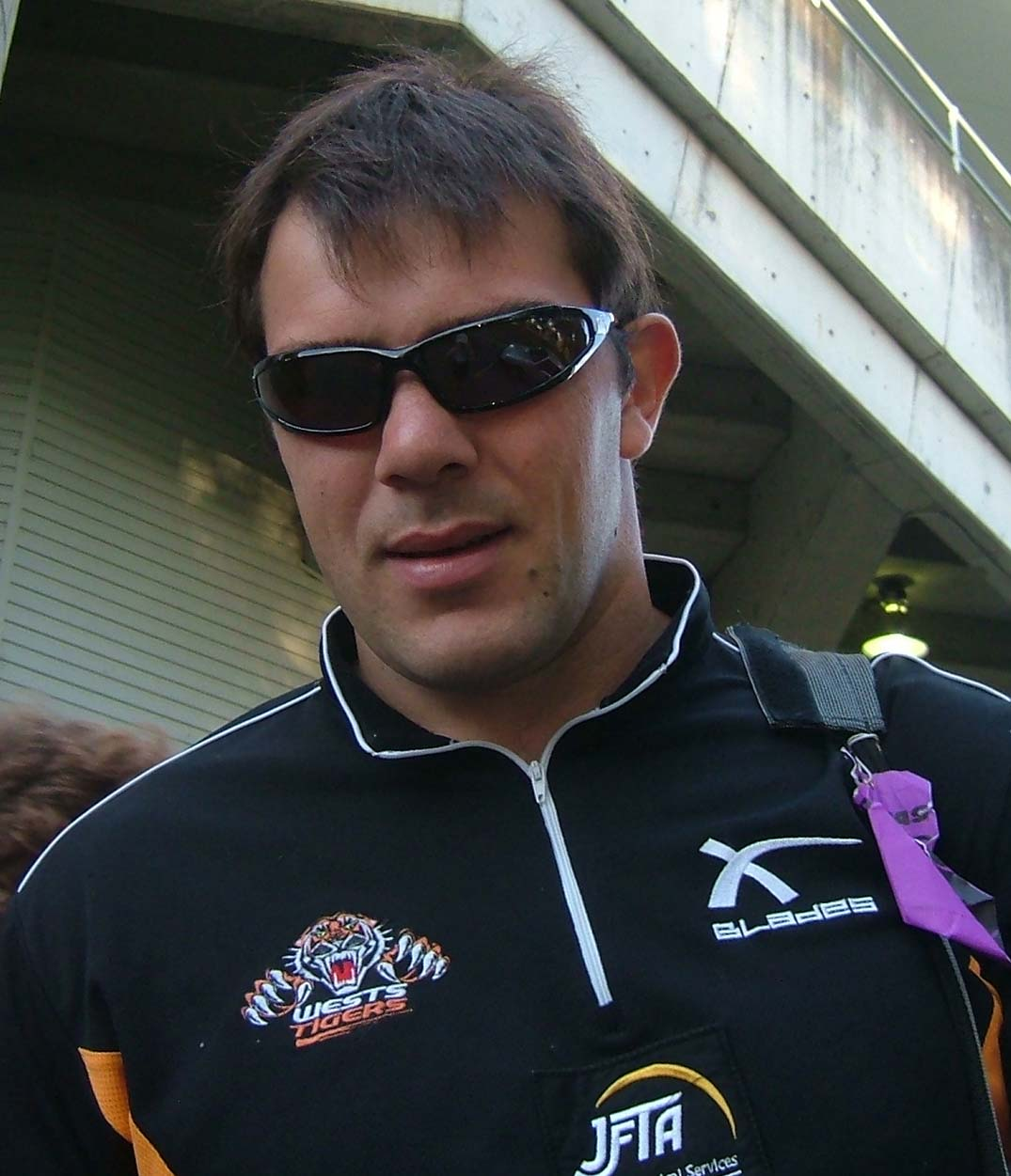
Skandalis in 2005

Skandalis was a member of the Wests Tigers team, which won the 2005 NRL Grand Final against the Cowboys. He was named in the Big League team of the year for the 2005 NRL season.

As NRL Premiers, Wests faced Super League champions Bradford Bulls in the 2006 World Club Challenge. Skandalis played as a prop forward in the Tigers' 30–10 loss. Skandalis held the record for the most first-grade games for the Wests Tigers with 185 appearances. In 2012 the record was surpassed by Chris Heighington, though Skandalis had previously played 64 games for Wests Magpies before the club merged. He was the last original Western Suburbs player remaining at the Wests Tigers club after the merger in 2000.

On 14 June 2006, Skandalis signed a two-year contract to play in the Super League with the Huddersfield Giants, starting from the 2007 season. In 2008, Skandalis was made vice-captain of the squad, alongside Ryan Hudson. He led the team out against Wigan when regular captain Chris Thorman was injured.

Skandalis returned to Australia at the end of the 2008 season following a knee injury—picked up early in the season—preventing him from participating further. Skandalis took up a post with Wests Tigers Youth Development.

In 2009, Skandalis was named in the Wests Magpies NSW Cup side, but was recalled to the Wests Tigers team from round 11, after injuries to other players. He remained in the first grade team for the rest of the season. After the end of the 2009 season, Skandalis announced he would be retiring and taking up the position of strength and conditioning coach with the Wests Tigers NYC team. However, Skandalis returned to play for the Magpies in the middle of the 2010 season, and then, in July, made a shock comeback with the Tigers, coach Tim Sheens saying, "I can't get rid of the guy." Playing another 5 games, he fell just short of making his 250th NRL appearance. He is the oldest player to have played at the club, being 34 years and 73 days old in his last appearance for the club. The inaugural "Philips Sports Dad of the Year" was awarded to Skandalis in late 2009, narrowly defeating Brett Kimmorley. He donated the money to the Starlight Children's Foundation. Skandalis has been made a life member of the Western Suburbs club.

Skandalis' Greek heritage made him eligible to represent Greece, which he did as captain. He played for Greece in the 2009 Australian Mediterranean Shield. Greece won the final 34–14 against Italy.

== Post-playing career ==
Having spent two years with the Wests Tigers' NYC team, in 2012 Skandalis became the club's head conditioner. He was removed from the position with the arrival of new coach Jason Taylor in 2014, but remained in the club in other roles. In 2017, he became an assistant to the Wests Magpies ISP coach, former teammate Brett Hodgson.

Skandalis has been involved in the Macquarie Fields Finding Jobs, Changing Lives program, helping troubled youth from the Macquarie Fields area. He was made an NRL ambassador in 2017.
