= Tom Hemingway =

Former English rugby league footballer

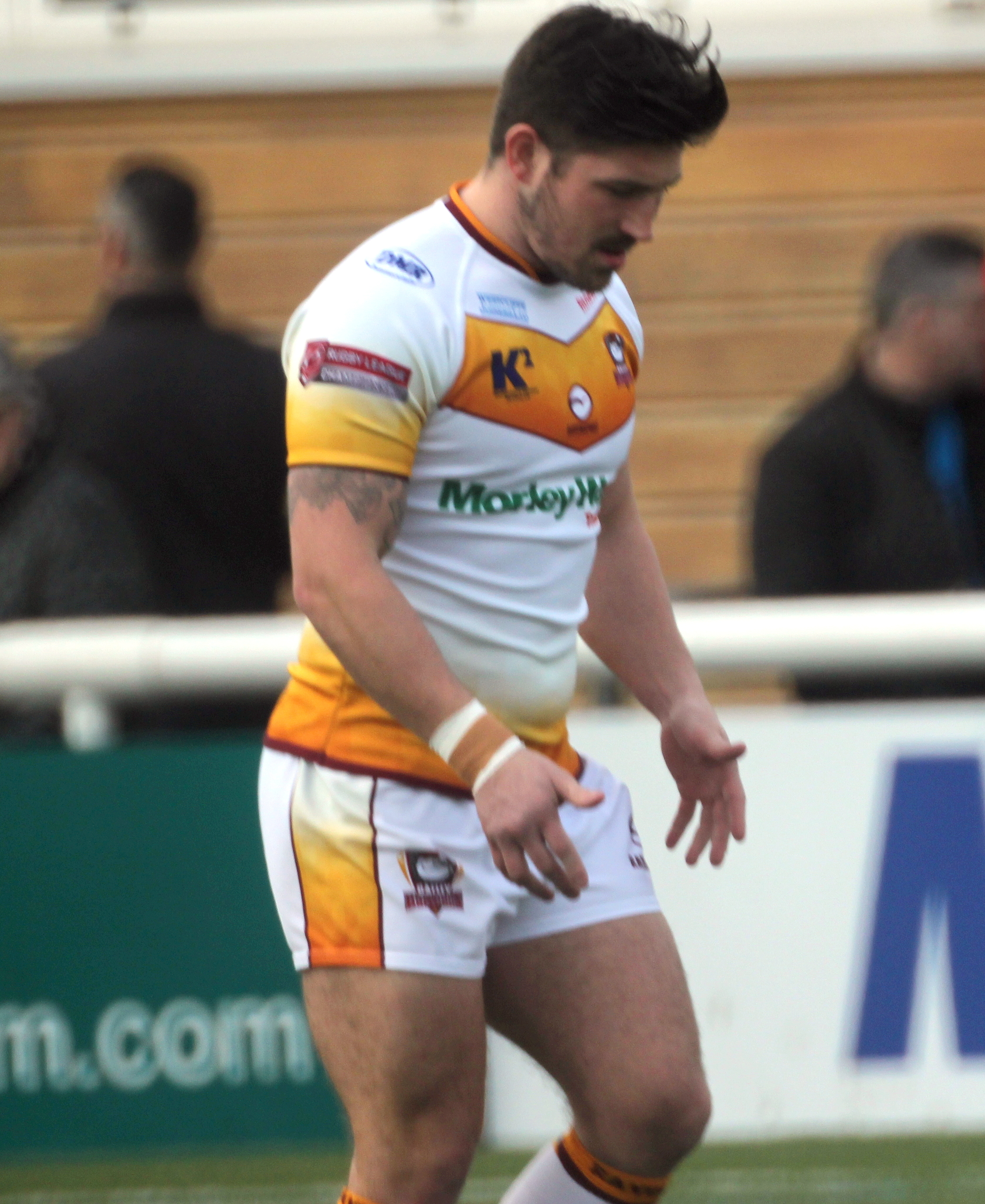
- Playing for Batley

Personal information
- Full name: Thomas Hemingway
- Born: 6 December 1986 (age 38); Dewsbury, West Yorkshire, England

Playing information
- Height: 5 ft 9 in (1.75 m)
- Weight: 13 st 1 lb (83 kg)
- Position: Hooker, Scrum-half, Stand-off
Club
| Years | Team | Pld | T | G | FG | P |
|---|---|---|---|---|---|---|
| 2005–09 | Huddersfield Giants | 18 | 2 | 18 | 0 | 44 |
| 2009(loan) | → Halifax | 2 | 0 | 0 | 0 | 0 |
| 2009(loan) | → Leigh Centurions | 6 | 0 | 0 | 1 | 1 |
| 2010 | Blackpool Panthers | 29 | 9 | 126 | 0 | 288 |
| 2011(loan) | → Featherstone Rovers | 3 | 2 | 0 | 0 | 8 |
| 2012(loan) | → Whitehaven | 7 | 3 | 0 | 0 | 12 |
| 2013 | Batley Bulldogs | 25 | 7 | 96 | 0 | 220 |
| 2014–17 | Dewsbury Rams | 63 | 5 | 86 | 0 | 192 |
| 2018–19 | Batley Bulldogs | 13 | 2 | 0 | 0 | 8 |
| | Total | 166 | 30 | 326 | 1 | 773 |

Tom Hemingway (born 6 December 1986) is an English former professional rugby league footballer who played as a hooker, scrum-half and stand-off in the 2000s and 2010s.

He played for the Batley Bulldogs in the Championship.

== Background ==
Hemingway was born in Dewsbury, West Yorkshire, England.

== Career ==
He started out with Super League side Huddersfield Giants before going on loan to the Batley Bulldogs.

Tom joined Blackpool Panthers ahead of the 2010 season and made an impressive start at scrum-half for the Championship One promotion hopefuls.

On 21 June 2019 Hemingway announced his retirement through injury
