= Steve Snitch =

English rugby league footballer

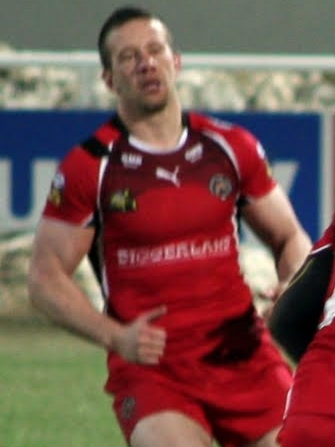

Personal information
- Born: 22 February 1983 (age 43) Kingston upon Hull, Humberside England

Playing information
- Height: 6 ft 1 in (185 cm)
- Weight: 15 st 10 lb (100 kg)
- Position: Second-row
Club
Years	Team	Pld	T	G	FG	P
2002–05	Wakefield Trinity Wildcats	66	5	0	0	20
2006–08	Huddersfield Giants	68	15	0	0	60
2009	Wakefield Trinity Wildcats	27	5	0	0	20
2010–12	Castleford Tigers	60	12	0	0	48
2013	Northern Pride
2014–15	Doncaster	35	10	0	0	40
2015 (loan)	→ Featherstone Rovers	10	2	0	0	8
2016	Featherstone Rovers	12	1	0	0	4
2017	Newcastle Thunder	12	4	0	0	16
	Total	290	54	0	0	216

Steve Snitch (born 22 February 1983) is an English former professional rugby league footballer, who last played for Newcastle Thunder in League 1.

Snitch was born in Kingston upon Hull, and has previous played at club level for Wakefield Trinity (two spells), the Huddersfield Giants, the Castleford Tigers, Doncaster and the Featherstone Rovers.

Snitch played for Huddersfield in the 2006 Challenge Cup Final from the interchange bench against St. Helens but Huddersfield lost 12–42. In 2013 Snitch played for the Cairns based Intrust Super Cup team, the Northern Pride.
