= Michael Lawrence (rugby league) =

Jamaica international rugby league footballer

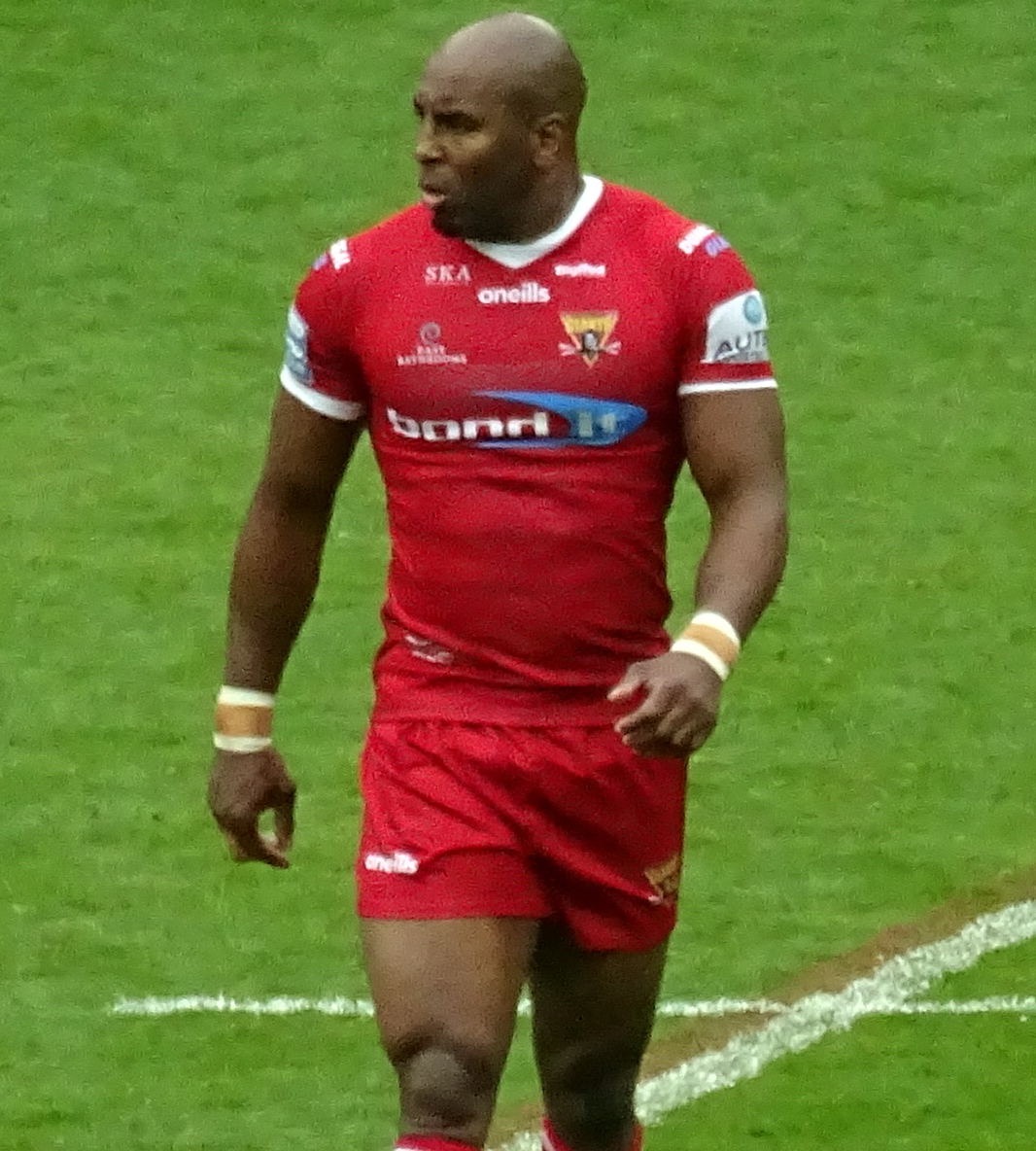

Personal information
- Full name: Michael George Lawrence
- Born: 12 April 1990 (age 36) Huddersfield, West Yorkshire, England

Playing information
- Height: 6 ft 2 in (1.89 m)
- Weight: 16 st 7 lb (105 kg)
- Position: Loose forward, Prop, Centre
Club
Years	Team	Pld	T	G	FG	P
2007–22	Huddersfield Giants	324	52	0	0	208
2023–25	Bradford Bulls	56	2	0	0	4
	Total	380	54	0	0	212
Representative
Years	Team	Pld	T	G	FG	P
2012–13	England Knights	2	2	0	0	8
2019–22	Jamaica	4	0	0	0	0

Michael "Bruno" Lawrence (born 12 April 1990) is a former professional rugby league footballer who last played as a loose forward for the Bradford Bulls in the RFL Championship. He was both an England Knights and Jamaican international, and has played as a centre, prop, winger and second-row forward at various stages during his career.

== Background ==
Lawrence was born in Huddersfield, West Yorkshire, England and has Jamaican heritage. Lawrence is a product of the Giants' academy system. and represented the England Knights in the European cup in 2012 In 2019 he enjoyed a well earned Testimonial year. He was a firm favourite amongst the Huddersfield supporters who referred to him as "Bruno", a nickname due to his likeness to the famous British boxer Frank Bruno.

== Career ==
It was announced in July 2007 that Lawrence would become a member Huddersfield's Super League squad for the 2008 season. Lawrence's previous club was Newsome Panthers. Lawrence was selected for the England Academy team in the 2007 season, a reward for consistently good performances throughout the season with Huddersfield's Academy. Lawrence made his Super League début during Huddersfield's important fixture with Warrington on 31 August 2007. He started the game on the substitutes' bench and replaced Chris Nero for the last five minutes of the game. This made him the first player born in the 1990s to play super league.

Since then Lawrence enjoyed a trip to the Challenge Cup final at Wembley in 2009 and was part of the history making squad that lifted the league leaders shield in 2013. Lawrence was granted a year long testimonial in 2019 for over ten years loyal service to the Huddersfield club. In 2012, Lawrence was a part of the England Knights team that won the European cup, and again in 2013 when they beat Samoa. In 2019, Lawrence represented Jamaica in a full international, ironically against the England knights at Leeds.

After 324 games for the Huddersfield club, Lawrence signed a contract to join RFL Championship side Bradford for the 2023 season.

On 29 September 2025 he announced that he had retired from the professional game
