= Jamahl Lolesi =

Professional RL coach & NZ former rugby league footballer

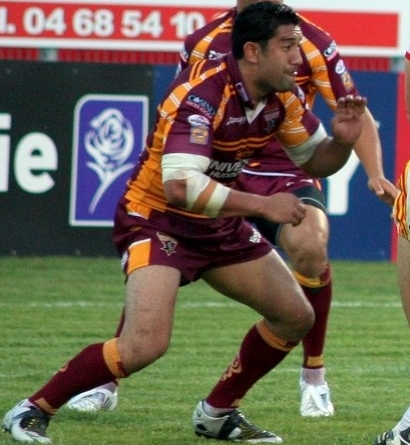

Personal information
- Full name: Jamahl Edward Lolesi
- Born: 20 March 1981 (age 44); Auckland, New Zealand

Playing information
- Height: 6 ft 0 in (1.83 m)
- Weight: 15 st 2 lb (96 kg)
- Position: Centre, Second-row, Wing
Club
Years	Team	Pld	T	G	FG	P
2000–03	Canberra Raiders	68	32	0	0	128
2004–05	Canterbury Bulldogs	44	20	0	0	80
2006	Wests Tigers	22	1	0	0	4
2007–10	Huddersfield Giants	95	33	0	0	132
	Total	229	86	0	0	344
Representative
Years	Team	Pld	T	G	FG	P
2004–05	New Zealand	2	0	2	0	4

Coaching information
Club
Years	Team	Gms	W	D	L	W%
2017	St Helens (interim)

Jamahl Lolesi (born 20 March 1981) is a New Zealand former professional rugby league footballer who played in the 2000s and 2010s. A New Zealand and Samoa international representative centre or wing, he had previously played for the Wests Tigers, Canterbury-Bankstown Bulldogs and the Canberra Raiders in the National Rugby League, and for the Huddersfield Giants in the Super League.

== Background ==
Lolesi was born in Auckland, New Zealand. He is of Samoan and Irish background.

== Playing career ==
Lolesi made his first grade debut for the Canberra Raiders against Cronulla-Sutherland in round 16 of the 2000 NRL season at Shark Park.

Lolesi played in the club's semi-final defeat by the Sydney Roosters during the same year. In the 2002 NRL season, Lolesi played in the club's qualifying final defeat by the New Zealand Warriors. In the 2003 NRL season, Lolesi played 25 games and scored 14 tries as Canberra finished fourth on the table. Lolesi played in Canberra's semi-final loss against the New Zealand Warriors in which they were defeated 17-16 at the Sydney Football Stadium.

Lolesi joined Canterbury-Bankstown for the 2004 NRL season. He played 20 games and scored 13 tries in the club's premiership winning year but missed out on playing in the 2004 NRL Grand Final due to injury. As 2004 NRL premiers, Canterbury-Bankstown Bulldogs faced Super League IX champions, Leeds Rhinos in the 2005 World Club Challenge. Lolesi played at centre and scored two tries in the Bulldogs' 32-39 loss.

Lolesi's first match for the Wests Tigers was the pre-season 2006 World Club Challenge which was lost to the Bradford Bulls in England. The Wests Tigers would miss out on the finals series in the 2006 NRL season after failing to defend their premiership finishing a disappointing 11th on the table. On 26 May 2009, Lolesi signed a new two-year contract with the Huddersfield Giants. Lolesi retired from playing in 2011.

== Coaching career ==
Before the 2013 Season, Lolesi followed Nathan Brown to St Helens R.F.C. as an Assistant coach where he worked alongside Keiron Cunningham. Jamahl stood in as interim Head Coach, after Cunningham was sacked, and until Justin Holbrook could be appointed.

== Career highlights ==
- Junior Club: Southport Tigers
- Career Stats: 131 career games to date scoring 52 tries
- Test Stats: 1 test for New Zealand in 2005, scoring 4 points (2 conversions)
