= Chris Thorman =

English rugby league footballer and coach

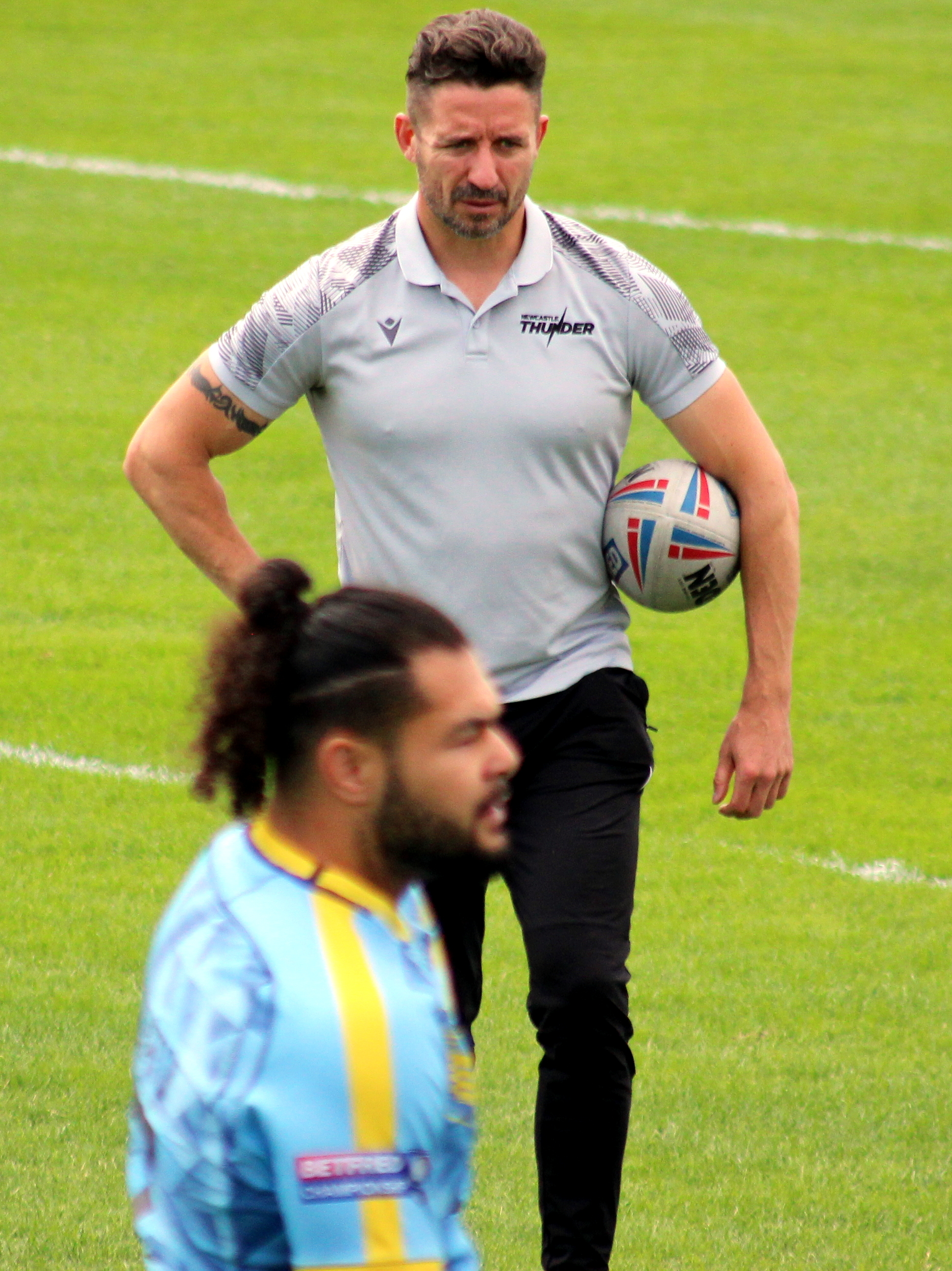

Personal information
- Full name: Christopher Thorman
- Born: 26 September 1980 (age 46) Wallsend, North Tyneside, England
- Height: 5 ft 11 in (1.80 m)
- Weight: 13 st 9 lb (87 kg)

Playing information
- Position: Fullback, Stand-off, Scrum-half, Hooker
Club
Years	Team	Pld	T	G	FG	P
1999	Sheffield Eagles	19	2	8	1	25
2000–02	Huddersfield-Sheffield	56	9	3	0	42
2003	London Broncos	29	8	81	1	195
2004	Parramatta Eels	11	1	1	0	6
2005–08	Huddersfield Giants	100	41	329	3	825
2009	Hull FC	21	1	0	0	4
2010–12	York City Knights	60	14	97	4	255
	Total	296	76	519	9	1352
Representative
Years	Team	Pld	T	G	FG	P
2003	Yorkshire	1	0	0	0	0
2005	England	2	0	0	0	0

Coaching information
Club
Years	Team	Gms	W	D	L	W%
2012	York City Knights	1	0	0	1	0
2016	Huddersfield Giants	10	4	1	5	40
2018	Huddersfield Giants	6	0	1	5	0
2019–22	Workington Town	50	16	1	33	32
2023–25	Newcastle Thunder	64	7	1	56	11
	Total	131	27	4	100	21
- Source: As of 22 June 2025

Christopher Thorman (born 26 September 1980) is an English professional rugby league coach who is an assistant coach at the York Knights in the Super League, the former head coach of the Newcastle Thunder and a former professional rugby league footballer.

An England international goal-kicking stand-off, he previously played in the Super League for Hull FC, Huddersfield Giants, London Broncos and the Sheffield Eagles, as well as in the National Rugby League for the Parramatta Eels. Following the sacking of Rick Stone as coach of the Huddersfield Giants, he was announced as interim head coach.

== Background ==
Born 26 September 1980 in Wallsend, North Tyneside, Thorman went to Western First School, Western Middle School and then onto Burnside Community High School (now known as Burnside Business and Enterprise College), where he was friends with former England football international Michael Carrick. His first rugby club was Newcastle Eagles (now known as Wallsend Eagles) where he played with his younger brothers, Paul and Neil, as a youngster under the watchful eye of Simon Wilkinson, the club's head coach. He was discovered by a scout and sent to regional camps and other rugby league trials. Playing for [North East U16] more and more scouts discovered the potential the young man had. At 16, he made his professional début playing for the Sheffield Eagles.

== Playing career ==
Thorman scored the fastest hat-trick of tries scored from the start of a match in 6 min 54 sec while playing for Huddersfield Giants against Doncaster Dragons in the semi-final of the Buddies National League Cup at Doncaster, South Yorkshire, on 19 May 2002.

In 2004, Thorman made a highly anticipated move to NRL side the Parramatta Eels. Thorman struggled with form and only made 11 appearances for the club before leaving Australia and signing with The Huddersfield Giants.

His representative honours include 1 game for Yorkshire, 1 game for England "A" and 2 games as England captain. Thorman captained Huddersfield in the 2006 Challenge Cup Final at stand-off half back against St. Helens but the Giants lost 12–42. In June 2007 Thorman was called up to the Great Britain squad for the Test match against France however missed the match with an injury to his thigh. Thorman signed a 1-year deal for Hull in the 2009 season but after a disappointing season for Hull he was sold to York City Knights. In March 2011, Thorman set a record for the highest individual score in the Challenge Cup by scoring 56 points as York won 132–0 over Northumbria University.

== Coaching career ==
In June 2012, Thorman announced to be joining Super League's Huddersfield Giants as an assistant coach at the end of the season.

On 3 May 2019, Thorman was appointed head coach at Workington Town, following the departure of former boss Leon Pryce. His move followed his resignation from his first management job at Huddersfield Giants.

On 21 June 2025 it was reported that Graham Steadman had taken over as interim head coach after Chris left to take up a new role as assistant coach at York Knights, under Mark Applegarth.
