= Paul Whatuira =

New Zealand international rugby league footballer

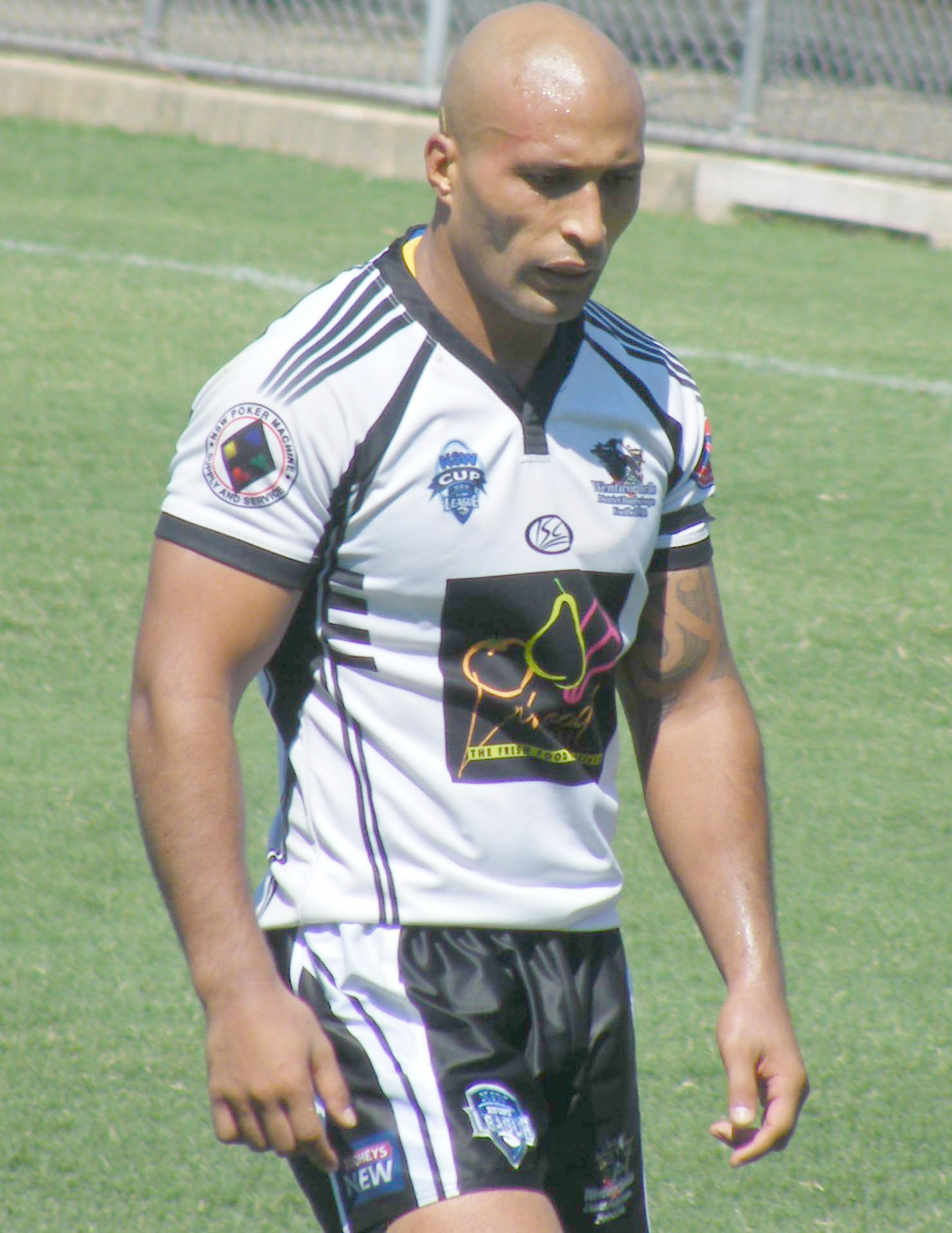

Personal information
- Full name: Paul Khan Whatuira
- Born: 31 July 1981 (age 45) Wellington, New Zealand

Playing information
- Height: 183 cm (6 ft 0 in)
- Weight: 92 kg (14 st 7 lb)
- Position: Centre
Club
Years	Team	Pld	T	G	FG	P
2000	Auckland Warriors	5	0	0	0	0
2001	Melbourne Storm	6	2	0	0	8
2002–04	Penrith Panthers	62	21	0	0	84
2005–07	Wests Tigers	58	30	0	0	120
2008–10	Huddersfield Giants	67	26	0	0	104
2011	Parramatta Eels	1	0	0	0	0
	Total	199	79	0	0	316
Representative
Years	Team	Pld	T	G	FG	P
2000	Aotearoa Māori	1	0	0	0	0
2005–07	New Zealand	16	4	0	0	16

Paul Whatuira (pronounced /fætuːwɪərə/, born 31 July 1981) is a New Zealand former professional rugby league footballer who last played for the Parramatta Eels in the NRL in 2011. A New Zealand international centre, he won National Rugby League premierships with the Penrith Panthers and Wests Tigers and achieved success with the Huddersfield Giants in the Super League.

== Background ==
Whatuira was born in Wellington, New Zealand.

== Playing career ==
=== Early years ===
Whatuira played his junior rugby league at Wainuiomata, near Wellington, where he played with former Huddersfield teammate David Faiumu. He also played rugby union as a schoolboy. He followed the Canberra Raiders as a child and idolised Mal Meninga.

He represented Wellington in 1999.

=== Auckland Warriors ===
Whatuira left Wellington at 17 to join the Auckland Warriors. He made his first grade début for Auckland Warriors against Wests Tigers in the Leichhardt Oval on 14 February 2000, in Round 2. He played in four other first grade games for the Warriors that season, before leaving the club at the end of the year. During the 2000 season he was occasionally released to the Wainuiomata Lions and played in the Bartercard Cup.

=== Melbourne Storm ===
He spent 2001 at the Melbourne Storm, playing in six first grade games.

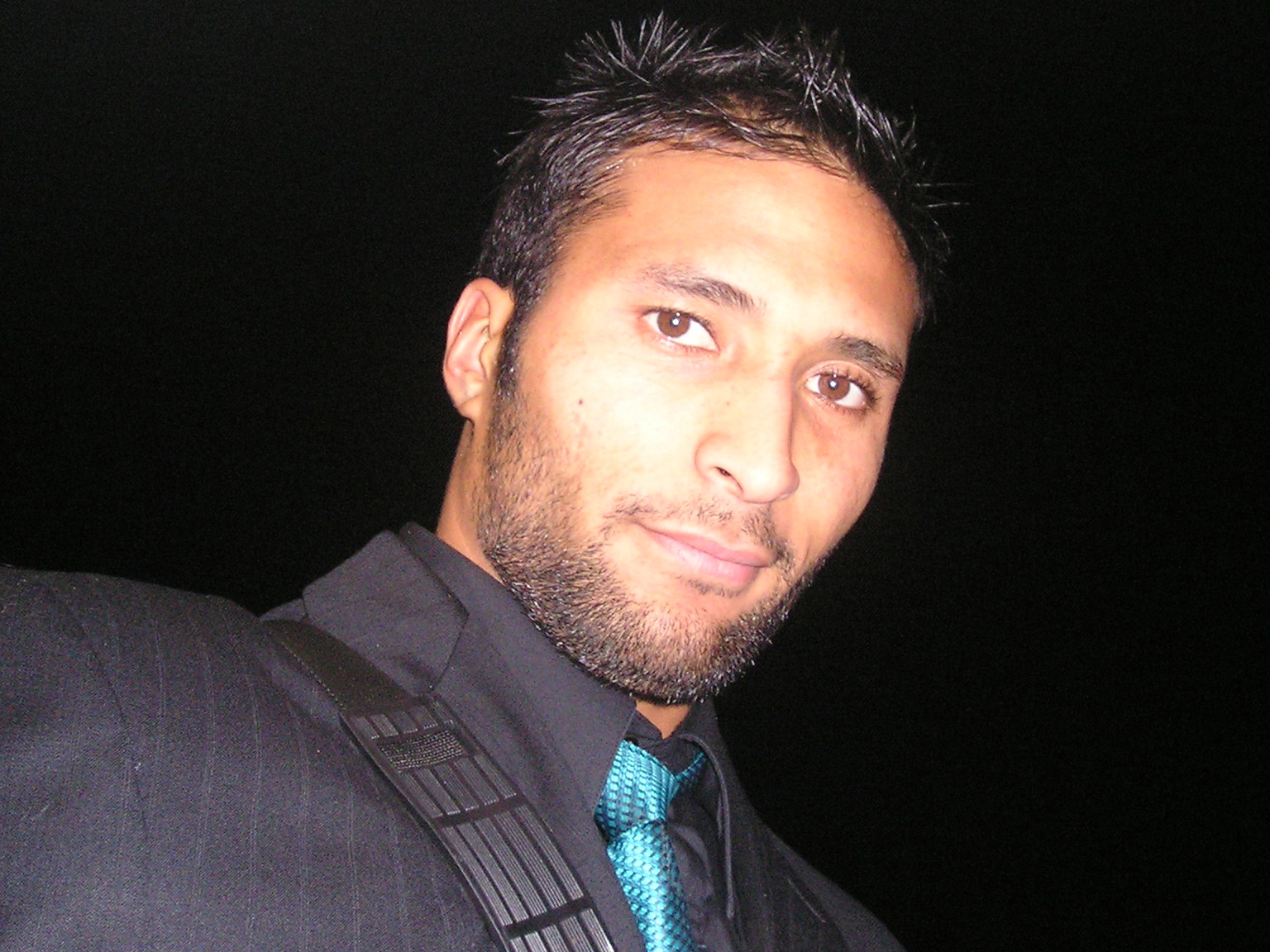
Whatuira in 2004

=== Penrith Panthers ===
Whatuira joined the Penrith Panthers in 2002 and became a first grade regular. He played left centre in the Panthers side that won the 2003 NRL grand final. As 2003 NRL premiers, the Panthers travelled to England to face Super League VIII champions, the Bradford Bulls in the 2004 World Club Challenge. Whatuira played at centre in the Panthers' 22–4 loss. His 2003 premiership ring was stolen from his home along with his DVD player in 2005. Two years later the police recovered the ring when they raided a suspected criminal's home.

=== Wests Tigers ===
Whatuira joined the Wests Tigers in 2005 and played at centre in the Tigers' 2005 NRL Grand Final victory over the North Queensland Cowboys, gaining his second premiership ring. As NRL Premiers Wests faced Super League champions Bradford Bulls in the 2006 World Club Challenge. Whatuira played at centre in the Tigers' 30–10 loss. Whatuira had a forgettable 2006, he was sin-binned in the Tigers' loss to the North Queensland Cowboys in Townsville just before half-time with Matt Sing scoring in his absence. In the return match, he suffered a hamstring injury which was aggravated during the warm-up versus Brisbane Broncos meaning he would not play for the rest of the campaign.

=== Huddersfield Giants ===
After considering a switch to rugby union with the New South Wales Waratahs, Whatuira instead moved to England and joined the Huddersfield Giants in 2008 where he is contracted until the end of the 2010 season. Whatuira played in Huddersfield's 2009 Challenge Cup Final appearance, where they lost to the Warrington Wolves.

=== Parramatta Eels ===
On 21 December 2010, Whatuira signed a one-year deal with the Parramatta Eels for the 2011 season. Whatuira was expected to fill the void left in the backline by departing senior players of Eric Grothe Jr and Timana Tahu. Eels CEO Paul Osborne stated that "Paul Whatuira is a proved international performer who brings class and experience to our backline". However, Whatuira retired after just appearing in one game for the club.

== Representative career ==
Whatuira represented the New Zealand national team on ten occasions between 2004 and 2006, including the 24–0 win over Australia at Elland Road in the 2005 Tri Nations tournament, in which he scored a try. Whatuira was also selected in the 19-man squad for the one-off New Zealand vs Australia Centenary test in Wellington, New Zealand on 14 October 2007.

Whatuira is also eligible for the Cook Islands and was named in their train on squad for the 2000 World Cup. He instead represented Aotearoa Māori at the tournament.

== Charity work ==
During 2006, Whatuira posed for the Naked Rugby League 2007-08 charity calendar, which was produced to raise money for the National Breast Cancer Foundation of Australia.

Paul also posed alongside former Wests Tigers teammates Robbie Farah and Dene Halatau for the Naked for a Cause 2008-09 calendar for the McGrath Foundation charity.

== Arrest ==
On 13 October 2009, Whatuira was arrested and underwent a psychiatric assessment after he allegedly assaulted two men. Police used a Taser gun to subdue him. Whatuira spent 13 days in a secure psychiatric hospital after the incident which was reportedly related to sexual abuse he suffered as a child. Whatuira was not charged over the incident as under section two of the British Crimes Act, he is exempt from potential prosecution as he was deemed "mentally ill".

== Match Fit and personal life ==
In 2024, he made his debut with Carlos Spencer in Match Fit: Union vs. League. Whatuira also beat Spencer in a charity Fight For Life boxing match. He also came first on the initial bronco endurance test at 5:37, two seconds faster than Louis Anderson. He improved to 5:17 on the final test, while Luis improved to 5:32. In 2023, he co-founded The Foundry Boxing Club. He is also a motivational speaker, founder and director of Inner Strength.

Mentally: He revealed that he was sexually abused as a child, suffered from psychosis, paranoia and had come close to committing suicide. He is engaged to Trina Tamati as of 2024, and had a daughter, Gabrielle from a previous marriage, while Trina had a daughter from a previous marriage, while they also have a 3-year-old son.

Despite already in a good shape, he managed to get a perfect -15 metabolic age in the final weigh-in.
