= Stephen Wild =

GB & England international rugby league footballer

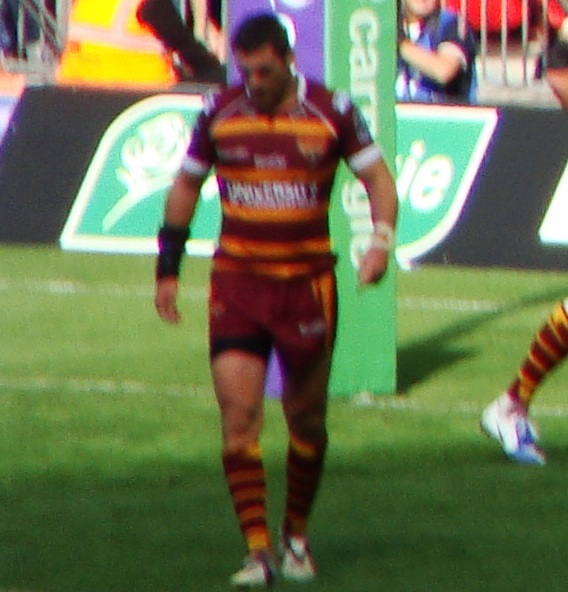

Personal information
- Born: 26 April 1981 (age 45) Wigan, Greater Manchester, England

Playing information
- Height: 6 ft 2 in (1.88 m)
- Weight: 16 st 1 lb (102 kg)
- Position: Wing, Centre, Second-row, Loose forward
Club
Years	Team	Pld	T	G	FG	P
2001–05	Wigan Warriors	100	30	0	0	120
2006–10	Huddersfield Giants	129	39	0	0	156
2011–13	Salford City Reds	74	4	0	0	16
2014–19	North Wales Crusaders	85	16	1	0	66
	Total	388	89	1	0	358
Representative
Years	Team	Pld	T	G	FG	P
2002	Lancashire	1	0	0	0	0
2005	England	1	0	0	0	0
2004–07	Great Britain	2	1	0	0	4

Stephen Wild (born 26 April 1981) is an English former professional rugby league footballer who played in the 2000s and 2010s.

He is the current CEO of Swinton Lions and vice-president of the RFL.

He played at representative level for Great Britain, England and Lancashire, and at club level for the Wigan Warriors, the Huddersfield Giants, the Salford City Reds and the North Wales Crusaders, as a wing, centre, second-row or loose forward.

== Background ==
Wild was born in Wigan, Greater Manchester, England.

== Playing career ==
Wild signed for Wigan Warriors from local amateurs Wigan St Patricks. He joined Wigan Warriors' first-team after progressing through the lower ranks at the club, making his début in 2001. He made his first representative appearance in 2002 for Lancashire. He was signed by Huddersfield Giants in 2006 and agreed a new contract keeping him at the club until 2009.

He was used as a loose forward at Huddersfield Giants, but he has previously played in the second-row and also as a centre. He has previously been compared to Nathan Hindmarsh, currently one of the sport's best players in Wild's position.

Wild played for Huddersfield Giants in the 2006 Challenge Cup Final at loose forward against St. Helens but the Huddersfield Giants lost 12–42. In June 2007 Wild was called up to the Great Britain squad for the test match against France, having made his début against Australia in 2004. He has also represented England against New Zealand, as well as Lancashire in Origin Series.

After retiring, Wild opened a gym in Wigan.
