= Leroy Cudjoe =

England international rugby league footballer

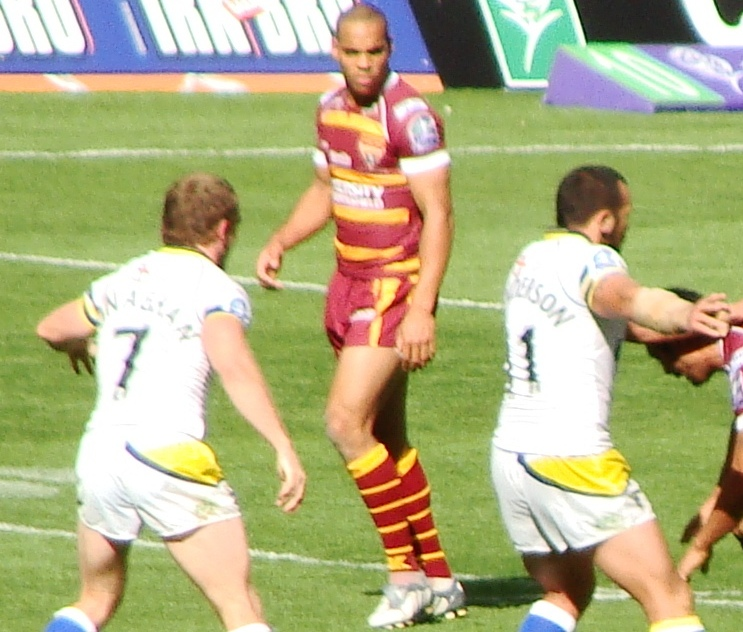

Personal information
- Full name: Leroy Daniel Cudjoe
- Born: 7 April 1988 (age 38) Huddersfield, West Yorkshire, England

Playing information
- Height: 6 ft 1 in (1.86 m)
- Weight: 15 st 13 lb (101 kg)
- Position: Centre, Wing, Fullback, Second-row, Loose forward
Club
Years	Team	Pld	T	G	FG	P
2008–25	Huddersfield Giants	408	137	63	1	695
Representative
Years	Team	Pld	T	G	FG	P
2010–13	England	10	3	1	0	14
- Relatives: Jermaine McGillvary (cousin)

Leroy Cudjoe (born 7 April 1988) is an English former professional rugby league footballer who last played as a Second-row for the Huddersfield Giants in the Super League. A product of the Huddersfield academy system, Leroy is a club legend, he was the captain of Huddersfield, and as well as representing England, he has played his whole Super League career to date with Huddersfield, playing as a winger, centre and fullback before moving into the pack, he has covered just about every position on the field for the Giants.

== Early life ==
Cudjoe was born in Huddersfield, West Yorkshire, England and is of Grenadian descent, where his father's family originated.

Leroy attended Newsome High School and Sports College, and played junior rugby league for the Newsome Panthers. He joined the Huddersfield Giants Academy at the age of 16.

== Domestic career ==
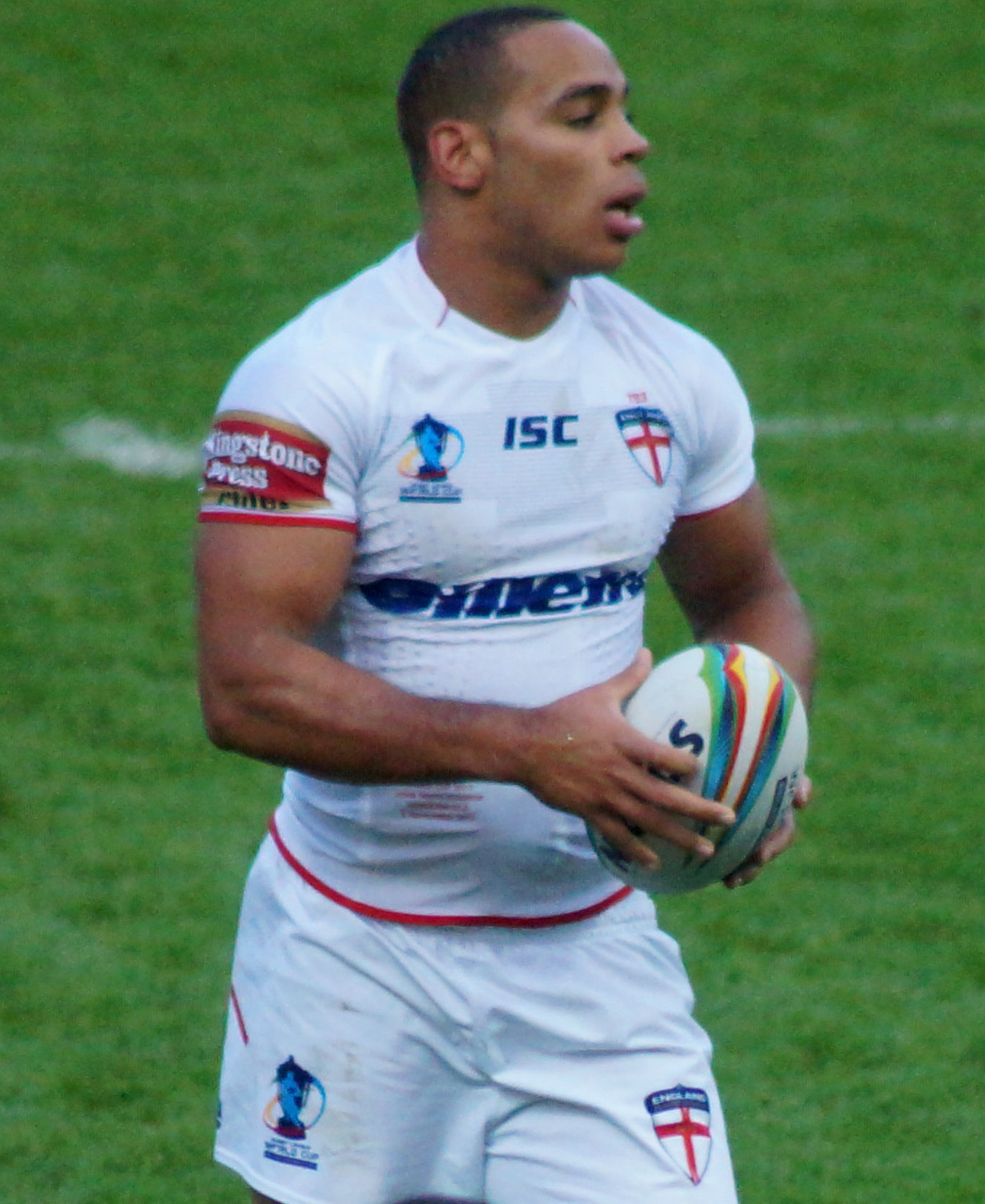
Cudjoe playing for England

=== Huddersfield Giants ===
Cudjoe was awarded a full-time contract with the Giants at the end of the 2006 season. His 2007 season was partly disrupted due to a broken hand sustained in May, and he did not make a first team appearance although won the Huddersfield Reserves Player of the Year award at the end of the season. He made his Super League début in the opening round of the 2008 season against Leeds Rhinos. He scored his first competitive try for the club in the 50–16 victory over Hull Kingston Rovers in May 2008. He continued to be a favourite during the 2011 and 2012 seasons at his hometown club Huddersfield.

In the 2013 Super League season, he played 29 games as Huddersfield claimed the League Leaders Shield for the first time in 81 years. Huddersfield would ultimately fall short of a grand final appearance that year.

After 10 years with the club, Cudjoe was given a testimonial in 2018 by Huddersfield. A chronic knee problem limited his appearances in the 2018 and 2019 seasons.

In round 15 of the 2021 Super League season, he played his 300th match for Huddersfield and scored a try in the club's 40-26 victory over Hull F.C. On 28 May 2022, Cudjoe played for Huddersfield in their 2022 Challenge Cup Final loss against Wigan.

In September 2025, Cudjoe announced he would retire at the end of the season.

== Representative career ==
=== Yorkshire ===
He was selected to play for Yorkshire Academy in the fixture against Lancashire Academy in the 2005 season.

=== England Academy ===
This fixture is often seen as a trial game and a test for the players to get onto the England Academy team and although he initially made the England training squad, Leroy missed out on a place in the final England squad.

=== England ===
He played his first match for England in the 2010 Four Nations tournament.

He played for England in the 2013 Rugby League World Cup.
