= David Hodgson (rugby league) =

GB & England international rugby league footballer

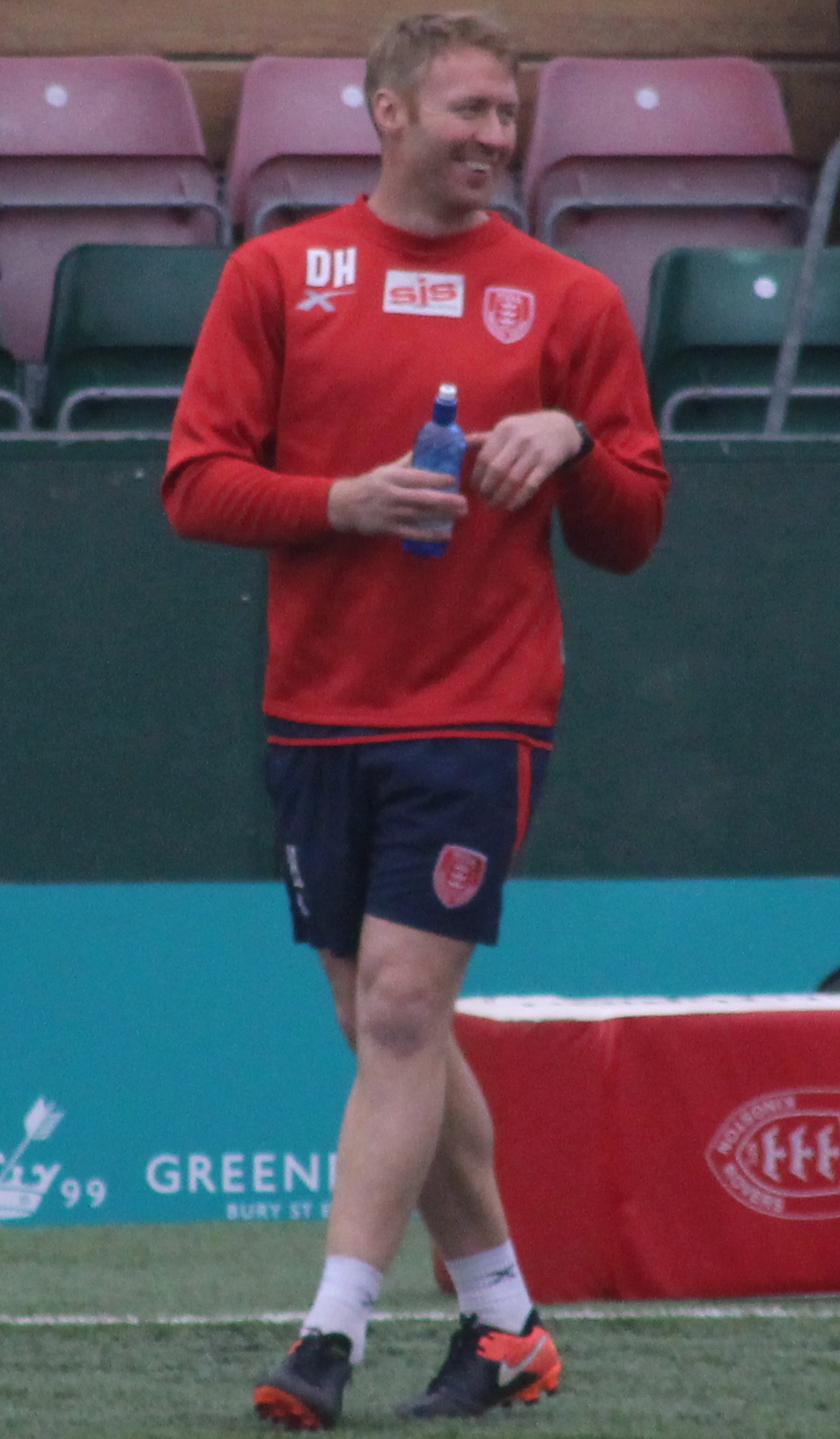

Personal information
- Full name: David Hodgson
- Born: 8 August 1981 (age 44) Kingston upon Hull, Humberside, England

Playing information
- Height: 5 ft 11 in (1.80 m)
- Weight: 14 st 9 lb (93 kg)
- Position: Fullback, Wing, Centre
Club
| Years | Team | Pld | T | G | FG | P |
|---|---|---|---|---|---|---|
| 1999 | Halifax | 13 | 5 | 0 | 0 | 20 |
| 2000–04 | Wigan Warriors | 118 | 48 | 0 | 0 | 192 |
| 2005–07 | Salford City Reds | 88 | 36 | 48 | 0 | 240 |
| 2008–11 | Huddersfield Giants | 93 | 65 | 1 | 0 | 262 |
| 2012–14 | Hull Kingston Rovers | 53 | 32 | 0 | 0 | 128 |
| 2017 | Hull Kingston Rovers | 5 | 2 | 0 | 0 | 8 |
| | Total | 370 | 188 | 49 | 0 | 850 |
Representative
| Years | Team | Pld | T | G | FG | P |
| 2001–03 | Yorkshire | 4 | 1 | 0 | 0 | 4 |
| 2001–07 | Great Britain | 4 | 1 | 0 | 0 | 4 |
| 2005–08 | England | 5 | 3 | 0 | 0 | 12 |

David Hodgson (born 8 August 1981) is an English professional rugby league coach who is an assistant coach at Hull Kingston Rovers in the Super League and a former rugby league footballer who played in the 1990s, 2000s and 2010s.

He played at international level for Great Britain and England, as well as representing Yorkshire. At club level for Halifax, the Wigan Warriors, the Salford City Reds, the Huddersfield Giants and Hull Kingston Rovers (two spells), as an occasional goal-kicking fullback, wing, or centre, and has coached at club level for Hull Kingston Rovers (assistant).

== Playing career ==
=== Halifax ===
Born in Hull, Hodgson began his career at Halifax in 1999, before moving to the Wigan Warriors in 2000, a tribunal fixing a £45,000 fee.

=== Wigan Warriors ===
Hodgson played on the wing and scored a try in the Wigan Warriors' 16-29 defeat by St. Helens in the 2000 Super League Grand Final during 2000's Super League V at Old Trafford, Manchester on Saturday 14 October 2000, in front of a crowd of 58,132.

In 2003 he was the Wigan Warriors's top try scorer with 20. He played for the Wigan Warriors at centre in the 2003 Super League Grand Final which was lost to the Bradford Bulls.

He signed for the Salford City Reds from the Wigan Warriors and when his contract expired at the end of 2004. He made a total of 118 appearances for Wigan, in which time he scored 48 tries.

=== Salford City Reds ===
Hodgson regained full fitness at the Salford City Reds which saw him named in the Great Britain standby squad for the Tri-Nations, the engage Super League Dream Team and also being named Supporter's Player of the Year and Player's Player of the Year at the Salford City Reds' annual awards ceremony. The club finished fifth in 2006's Super League XI, their highest ever position, and went on to the end of season play-offs for the first time.

On 11 March 2006, he scored a club Super League record 8-goal kicks – despite having never kicked a goal before the start of 2006's Super League XI.

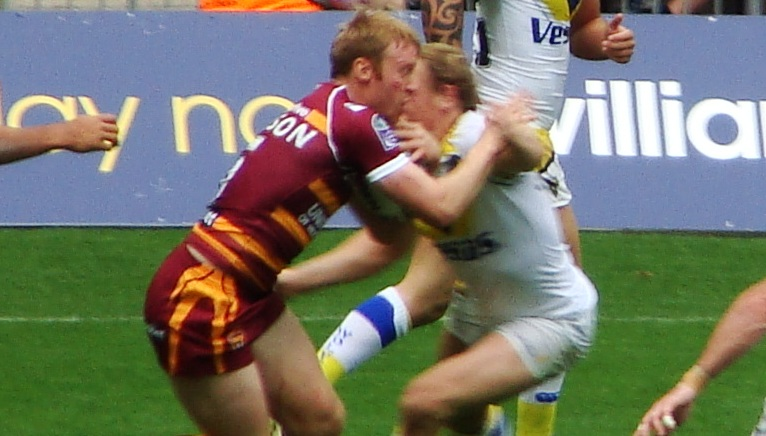
Hodgson in action for the Huddersfield Giants

=== Huddersfield Giants ===
In September 2007 Hodgson signed for the Huddersfield Giants, following the Salford City Reds' relegation from Super League. He missed most of the 2008 season after suffering a knee ligament injury in training.

=== Hull Kingston Rovers ===
On 18 July 2011, Hodgson signed a three-year deal with his hometown club, Hull Kingston Rovers.

== Representative ==
On 10 November Hodgson made his first appearance of Great Britain's test series against New Zealand and scored.

In June 2007 he was called up to the Great Britain squad for the Test match against France

He was named in the England training squad for the 2008 Rugby League World Cup.

He was named in the England team to face Wales at the Keepmoat Stadium prior to England's departure for the 2008 Rugby League World Cup.

== Post-playing career ==
On 3 October 2014, Hodgson announced his retirement and he signed a two-year contract to stay at his hometown club Hull Kingston Rovers as an assistant coach, along with Willie Poching.
