= Brad Drew =

Australian rugby league footballer

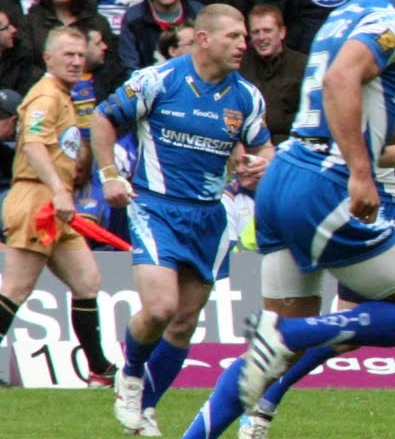
- Drew playing for Huddersfield in 2010

Personal information
- Full name: Bradley Drew
- Born: 25 August 1975 (age 50) Sydney, New South Wales, Australia

Playing information
- Height: 5 ft 7 in (171 cm)
- Weight: 13 st 0 lb (83 kg)
- Position: Hooker, Halfback
Club
Years	Team	Pld	T	G	FG	P
1993–00	Penrith Panthers	62	9	0	1	37
2001–02	Parramatta Eels	45	6	6	1	37
2003–04	Canberra Raiders	38	5	1	4	26
2005–07	Huddersfield Giants	90	18	26	1	125
2008–09	Wakefield Trinity Wildcats	40	7	15	1	59
2010	Huddersfield Giants	9	1	0	0	4
	Total	284	46	48	8	288
Representative
Years	Team	Pld	T	G	FG	P
2001–04	City Origin	2	0	0	0	0

Brad Drew (born 25 August 1975) is an Australian former professional rugby league footballer who played in the 1990s and 2000s. A City New South Wales representative hooker, he played in Australia for Penrith, Parramatta and Canberra and in England for Huddersfield and Wakefield Trinity Wildcats.

== Playing career ==
Drew made his first grade debut for Penrith in round 19 1993 against Balmain at Leichhardt Oval.

Drew made no first grade appearances for three years before making his next appearances in 1996. It wasn't later in his Penrith career that Drew featured more prominently for the team. In 2000, Drew played for Penrith in their semi final defeat against Parramatta. This was Drew's last game for Penrith and he signed for Parramatta in the aftermath.

Drew played at hooker for the Parramatta Eels in their 2001 NRL grand final loss to the Newcastle Knights. In the 2002 season, Drew played for Parramatta in their finals loss against the Brisbane Broncos.

In 2003, Drew signed for Canberra. In the 2003 season, Canberra finished in 4th place on the table. Drew played in their elimination finals loss against New Zealand. The following year in 2004, Canberra again made the finals and Drew played in their finals defeat against the Sydney Roosters.

Drew later signed to play in the Super League for English club Huddersfield Giants. He played for Huddersfield in the 2006 Challenge Cup Final at hooker against St. Helens but the Giants lost 12–42.

Drew was the fitness conditioner for Scotland in the 2008 Rugby League World Cup, having been a critical part of the coaching and management staff for a number of years.

After an impressive stint at rivals Wakefield Trinity Wildcats, Drew re-signed for Huddersfield in September 2009.

== Coaching career ==
In 2016, Drew became manager of Ron Massey Cup team the St Marys Saints. In his first year of management, Drew took St Marys to the Ron Massey Cup grand final but fell short to the Mount Pritchard Mounties. In 2017, St Marys finished as minor premiers in the Ron Massey Cup but were defeated by the Auburn Warriors in the preliminary final. Drew is set to return to St Marys as head coach of their Sydney Shield team for the 2026 season.

== After playing career ==
In 2014, Drew became a Real Estate Agent in the Lower Blue Mountains region.
