= 2012 Bradford Bulls season =

- Super League XVII Rank: 9th
- Play-off result: Did not qualify
- Challenge Cup: 5th round
- 2012 record: Wins: 15; draws: 1; losses: 13
- Points scored: For: 721; against: 794

Team information
- Chairman: Gerry Sutcliffe MP
- Head Coach: Mick Potter
- Captain: Heath L'Estrange and Matt Diskin
- Stadium: Odsal Stadium
- Avg. attendance: 12,784
- High attendance: 20,821 – vs. Leeds Rhinos

Top scorers
- Tries: Brett Kearney & Elliott Whitehead (15)
- Goals: Luke Gale (67)
- Points: Luke Gale (143)
← 2011	List of seasons	2013 →

This article details the Bradford Bulls rugby league football club's 2012 season, the seventeenth season of the Super League era.

== Season review ==
July 2011

Bradford Bulls announce the signing of NRL centre Keith Lulia from the Newcastle Knights on a 2-year deal. Also veteran winger Gareth Raynor signed a 1-year extension keeping him at the Bulls for the 2012 season. Raynor was later released for a severe breach of club discipline. Harlequins RL halfback Luke Gale signed a 2-year deal with Bradford making him the second new face at Odsal for 2012. Crusaders withdrew their Super League application and as a result the Bulls swooped for halfback Jarrod Sammut on a 1 Year Contract.

August 2011

The Bulls announce that winger and top point scorer Patrick Ah Van signed a 2 Year Contract with Super League newcomers Widnes Vikings. Also another new signing was announced in the form of Aussie centre/winger Adrian Purtell from Penrith Panthers on a 3-year deal. Winger Shaun Ainscough signed a new 1 Year Deal with the Bulls while fullback Shad Royston is set to join Pia Donkeys in the French league for 2012. Bradford have promoted 18-year-old back rower Jobe Murphy to their first team squad for 2012.

September 2011

Former Great Britain centre Chev Walker signed a 1-year extension to stay with the Bulls for 2012. Gareth Raynor was released from the remaining year on his contract while club captain Andy Lynch was sold to Hull F.C. for a 6 figure sum, on a 2-year contract.

October 2011

Young promising winger Vinny Finigan signs a 1 Year Deal at the Sheffield Eagles after being frozen out of the Bulls first team by Mick Potter, however the Bulls announce they have secured a fifth signing in the form of highly rated ex-Crusaders winger Elliot Kear on a 3 Year Deal. Parramatta Eels forward Manase Manuokafoa signs a 1 Year Deal with the Bulls following Mick Potter's trip to Australia. Academy product Steve Crossley joined Dewsbury Rams on a permanent deal while youngster Cain Southernwood joins the Rams on a year-long loan. Dewsbury also announce that they are playing the Bulls is a pre-season friendly on 22 January 2012 at Rams Stadium. Another pre-season game was announced for 15 January 2012 against reigning Championship winners Featherstone Rovers at Post Office Road. On the last day of October another two friendlies are announced, the first will be played on Boxing Day against Castleford Tigers at Wheldon Road while the last friendly will be on 27 or 29 January 2012 depending when the season starts, this friendly will be at the KC Stadium against Hull F.C. for Lee Radford's testimonial.

November 2011

The Bulls go back to training and the overseas players join the 2012 Bulls squad for the first time. Bradford release their squad numbers for the 2012 season with Brett Kearney getting the number 1 shirt while Ben Jeffries will wear number 6. The new number 7 was revealed as Luke Gale. The 2012 fixtures were released and it revealed that the Bulls would start their campaign at Odsal Stadium against the Catalans Dragons and they would finish their season against the same opponent at Stade Gilbert Brutus. The 2012 Home shirt was released on the 26th.

December 2011

Local Championship side Keighley Cougars announce another pre-season friendly against the Bulls on 27 January at Cougar Park. The Bulls travelled to Castleford Tigers on Boxing Day to play their annual friendly, however things didn't start well for the Bulls as new signing Manase Manuokafoa was injured in the warm up. Jason Crookes, Chev Walker, Bryn Hargreaves and Shaun Ainscough all scored for the Bulls with Kyle Briggs kicking 1 goal from 4 attempts, however it was not enough and Castleford won the game 28–18.

January 2012

Gareth Raynor signed a 1-year contract with Championship winners Featherstone Rovers for the 2012 season. The Bulls announce that former player Karl Pryce has returned from the club on a 1 Year Deal from Wigan Warriors the 25-year-old can play wing, centre and second row, he was given the number 33 shirt. The friendly against Featherstone was cancelled due to a frozen pitch. The Bulls beat local Championship side Dewsbury Rams 42–16, Adrian Purtell scored a try on his debut and Luke Gale scored 2 tries, Shaun Ainscough, trialist Phil Joseph, Tom Burgess and Paul Sykes also scored. Gale kicked 7 goals. It was announced on the 25th that hookers Heath L'Estrange and Matt Diskin would share the captain's armband for the 2012 season, also the 2012 Away shirt was revealed. Another big story in January was that Rugby League's governing body, the Rugby Football League (RFL) had bought the lease to Odsal Stadium for defensive reasons, they currently rent the ground to the Bulls. An Under 20's side featuring Ainscough, Danny Addy and Kyle Briggs lost 28–12 to a full strength Keighley Cougars, youngster Johnny Payne and Briggs both scored tries whilst Briggs kicked 2 goals. An under strength Bulls side travelled to the KC Stadium to play in Lee Radford's testimonial game. A full strength Hull F.C. side won 46–6 with Bradford's sole try coming from a 90m effort from Jason Crookes with Gale kicking the goal.

February 2012

The Bulls start their 2012 campaign with a 34–12 loss to the Catalans Dragons, the Bulls were 20–0 down at halftime before tries from Jamie Langley and Elliot Kear got them on the scoreboard. Luke Gale kicked 2 goals from the touchline. Kyle Briggs was once again loaned out however this time he was sent to his former club Featherstone Rovers for the season. The return of Elliott Whitehead certainly helped lift the Bulls in defence as they put in a very huge defensive effort to beat Castleford Tigers 20–12. Jarrod Sammut opened the scoring with further tries coming from Tom Burgess and Brett Kearney, Gale kicked 4 goals. The Bulls were destroyed by Challenge Cup holders Wigan Warriors, the Warriors won the game 54–16 with Jason Crookes, Sammut and Kearney scoring and Sammut kicked 2 goals after Gale was helped off the pitch. The Bulls carried on their 100% away win record with a hard-fought 36–18 victory against Wakefield Trinity Wildcats, former Wildcat Ben Jeffries kicked Wakefield to death and Elliott Whitehead scored a hat-trick, Brett Kearney scored two and Keith Lulia scored his first try for the Bulls. Sammut kicked all six goals.

March 2012

The Bulls started off March with a very impressive performance against league leaders Warrington Wolves, the Bulls were the better side for the majority of the game with John Bateman and Manase Manuokafoa both impressing however they could not prevent a controversial 23–10 loss with Matt Diskin and Jason Crookes scoring and Jarrod Sammut kicking a goal. The Bulls staged an impressive fightback from 24–8 down to beat Hull Kingston Rovers 36–24 with Crookes grabbing his hat-trick, Karl Pryce, Diskin, Brett Kearney and Keith Lulia also scored with Sammut kicking 4 goals. Bradford got their first home win against a St. Helens side struggling for form, however it was no easy task as the Bulls and Saints players ran their blood to water but the Bulls defence stood firm and they ground out a 12–8 win (their first win over Saints since 2009) with Elliott Whitehead crossing for an 8-point try after Jamie Foster kicked him and early in the second half Karl Pryce crossed for a try, returning Paul Sykes kicked 2 from 3. Youngster Elliott Whitehead signed a new 5 Year Deal to stay with the club until at least 2016. After a good few games the Bulls reverted to their old ways and lost to Salford City Reds 38–18 with Kearney, Whitehead and Bryn Hargreaves scoring and the returning Sammut kicking 3 goals. The Bulls were hit with a massive financial blow when the RBS limited their overdraft leaving the Bulls with no cash, with no other option Peter Hood turned an asked the fans to help out by donating money to the club. Also Paul Sykes joined Wakefield Trinity Wildcats on a season long loan. The Bulls put up a spirited display against 2nd place Hull F.C. however despite being the better side for most of the match Hull came away with a lucky 24–18 win, Lulia, Pryce and youngster John Bateman all scored tries with Sammut kicking all 3 goals.

April 2012

The Bulls started April off with a win against rivals Leeds Rhinos, Bradford won the game 12–4 with Jamie Langley and Ben Jeffries scoring a try each and Jarrod Sammut kicked both goals. Bradford backed up the victory over Leeds with a 38–4 win against new boys Widnes Vikings, Jeffries crossed for an early try and Michael Platt scored 2, Craig Kopczak, Adrian Purtell, Manase Manuokafoa and Keith Lulia also scored tries, Sammut kicked 4 goals and Danny Addy kicked the final goal. The Bulls booked their place in the Challenge Cup 5th round by brushing aside Championship 1 club Doncaster 72–6, Shaun Ainscough and Elliott Whitehead both scored hat-tricks, Lulia and Matt Diskin both scored 2 a piece whilst Jeffries, John Bateman and Kopczak all scored. Addy kicked 10 goals. Bradford lost 20–6 to league leaders Huddersfield Giants, the conditions were extremely poor and a depleted Bulls side battled well and defended extremely well but Danny Brough proved to be the difference. Platt scored the only Bradford try and Addy converted. Bradford were dumped out of the Challenge Cup by heavily favoured Warrington Wolves however the Bulls battled bravely before finally losing 32–16 with Purtell, Lulia and Olivier Elima all scoring and Luke Gale kicking 2 goals on his return.

May 2012

Young hooker Adam O'Brien signs a new 5-year deal with the club. The Bulls travelled down to London Broncos and secured a hard-fought 29–22 win with Karl Pryce scoring a try and Michael Platt scoring 4. Luke Gale kicked 4 goals and a drop goal to put them 3 points clear of 9th place and on level points with Leeds Rhinos. Bradford drew against Salford City Reds 20–20 with Pryce scoring a hat-trick and Tom Burgess also scoring, Gale kicked 2 goals. The Bulls lose yet again at the Magic Weekend to rivals Leeds Rhinos 37–22, Elliott Whitehead, Ben Jeffries, Matt Diskin and Elliot Kear all scored for Bradford and Gale kicked 3 goals. Chairman Peter Hood officially stood down and his predecessor Chris Caisley took on the role.

June 2012

Bradford kicked off June with a 46–32 win against Castleford Tigers. Keith Lulia, John Bateman and Olivier Elima all scored a try each whilst Brett Kearney scored 2 and Shaun Ainscough scored a hat-trick, Luke Gale also got on the scoresheet kicking 7 goals. Bradford suffered an embarrassing 54–0 loss at the hands of St Helens R.F.C. After a week's break, due to the International Origin, the Bulls bounced back and beat fellow playoff competitors Wakefield Trinity Wildcats 34–26, Elliott Whitehead, Ainscough and Elima all scored a try each whilst Lulia scored 2, Gale kicked all 5 conversions and two penalty goals. Due to the major financial crisis at the club the Bulls officially went into administration on 26 June 2012. Bradford managed to record a phenomenal 30–22 win over league leaders Wigan Warriors at the DW Stadium, 2 tries from former Warrior Karl Pryce, and a try each for Lulia, Kearney and Whitehead won the game whilst Gale kicked all 5 goals.

July 2012

On 2 July the administrators officially sacked the entire coaching staff including Head Coach Mick Potter, Assistants Lee St Hilaire and Francis Cummins and also Head of Youth Development Paul Medley. Bradford easily beat bottom of the table London Broncos 44–12 with Manase Manuokafoa, Elliott Whitehead, Luke Gale and Michael Platt all scored a try each whilst Brett Kearney scored 4 tries and Gale added 6 goals. The Bulls lost to arch rivals Leeds Rhinos 34–16 with Whitehead, Olivier Elima and Karl Pryce scoring tries whilst Gale kicked 2 goals. Bradford were also handed a 6-point deduction for entering administration which puts them out of the playoff places. The Bulls wrapped up July with a 50–22 loss to Warrington Wolves, Danny Addy scored 2 tries whilst Whitehead and Pryce also crossed and Gale kicked 3 goals.

August 2012

Bradford started August with a win in a must win game after their 6-point deduction. They beat Widnes Vikings 38–26 with Michael Platt and Shaun Ainscough both scoring 2 tries each and Brett Kearney, Ben Jeffries and Heath L'Estrange all added to the total with a try each. Scrum half Luke Gale kicked 5 goals. It was announced that youngster Tom Burgess would join his brothers Sam Burgess, Luke Burgess and George Burgess at NRL team South Sydney Rabbitohs for the 2013 season. Bradford received a massive boost to their playoff hopes with a 32–26 win over 8th place Hull Kingston Rovers, this means that the Bulls go level on points with them with 3 games left to play. Jamie Langley crossed for a rare double whilst Ainscough, Jason Crookes and Elliott Whitehead also scored whilst Gale kicked 6 goals. The Bulls once again overcame the odds and beat fellow Yorkshiremen Huddersfield Giants 34–12, Ainscough scored his first try away from home and Matt Diskin, Gale, and Kearney all scored a try whilst returning Karl Pryce grabbed a double. Gale added 5 goals and put Bradford back into the playoff places.

September 2012

It was announced that Omar Khan and MP Gerry Sutcliffe would become new owners of the Bulls after paying £150,000 to secure the ownership. Not long after the Bulls went to suffer a massive 70–6 loss to Hull F.C. with only Jason Crookes scoring a try for Bradford whilst Luke Gale kicked the goal. Ben Jeffries announced that he would be returning to Australia at the end of the season to become a miner and play part-time with the Kurri Kurri Bulldogs. In addition to Jeffries leaving, former Salford player Ian Sibbit announces that he will retire at the end of the year. Second rower Olivier Elima also announced he would leave at the end of the season to join former club Catalans Dragons on a 2-year deal, this came as no surprise as Elima had already stated he wanted to go home so his kid could go to a French school. A minor departure was Craig Kopczak, he refused to have his contract transferred over to Omar Khan's Bulls so it was automatically terminated, he looks set to sign for Huddersfield Giants. The Bulls wrap up their weekly rounds with a 50–26 loss to Catalans Dragons, the loss means that they are 1 point behind 8th placed Wakefield Trinity Wildcats and this makes it the 4th year in a row that the Bulls have failed to make the playoffs.

== 2012 milestones ==
- Round 1: Luke Gale, Adrian Purtell, Elliot Kear and Jarrod Sammut made their debuts for the Bulls.
- Round 1: Elliot Kear scored his 1st try for the Bulls.
- Round 1: Luke Gale kicked his 1st goal for the Bulls.
- Round 2: Jarrod Sammut scored his 1st try for the Bulls.
- Round 3: Keith Lulia and Phil Joseph made their debuts for the Bulls.
- Round 3: Jason Crookes scored his 1st try for the Bulls.
- Round 3: Jarrod Sammut kicked his 1st goal for the Bulls.
- Round 4: Brett Kearney and Heath L'Estrange made their 50th appearance for the Bulls.
- Round 4: Keith Lulia scored his 1st try for the Bulls.
- Round 4: Brett Kearney scored his 25th try and reached 100 points for the Bulls.
- Round 4: Elliott Whitehead scored his 2nd hat-trick for the Bulls.
- Round 5: Manase Manuokafoa made his debut for the Bulls.
- Round 6: Karl Pryce made his debut in his 2nd stint with the Bulls.
- Round 6: Karl Pryce scored his 1st try in his 2nd stint at the Bulls.
- Round 6: Jason Crookes scored his 1st hat-trick for the Bulls.
- Round 8: Paul Sykes made his 100th appearance in his 2nd stint with the Bulls.
- Round 8: Bryn Hargreaves scored his 1st try for the Bulls.
- Round 11: Adrian Purtell scored his 1st try for the Bulls.
- Round 11: Manase Manuokafoa scored his 1st try for the Bulls.
- CCR4: Callum Windley made his debut for the Bulls.
- CCR4: Elliott Whitehead scored his 3rd hat-trick for the Bulls.
- CCR4: Elliott Whitehead scored his 25th try and reached 100 points for the Bulls.
- CCR4: Shaun Ainscough scored his 1st hat-trick for the Bulls.
- Round 13: Michael Platt scored his 1st four-try haul and his 3rd hat-trick for the Bulls.
- Round 13: Luke Gale kicked his 1st drop goal for the Bulls.
- Round 14: Karl Pryce scored his 3rd hat-trick for the Bulls.
- Round 16: Shaun Ainscough scored his 2nd hat-trick for the Bulls.
- Round 20: Brett Kearney scored his 1st four-try haul and his 1st hat-trick for the Bulls.
- Round 20: Luke Gale scored his 1st try for the Bulls.
- Round 23: Luke Gale reached 100 points for the Bulls.
- Round 23: Bryn Hargreaves made his 50th appearance for the Bulls.
- Round 27: Jarrod Sammut scored his 1st four-try haul and 1st hat-trick for the Bulls.

== Pre-season friendlies ==
Legend
Win
Draw
Loss

Bulls score is first.

Date	Competition	Vrs	H/A	Venue	Result	Score	Tries	Goals	Att	Report
26 December 2011	Pre Season	Castleford Tigers	A	The Jungle	L	18–28	Crookes, Walker, Hargreaves, Ainscough	Briggs 1/4	3,296	Report
22 January 2012	Pre Season	Dewsbury Rams	A	Tetley's Stadium	W	42–16	Purtell, Gale (2), Ainscough, Sykes, Joseph, Burgess	Gale 7/7	1,402	Report
27 January 2012	Pre Season	Keighley Cougars	A	Cougar Park	L	12–28	Payne, Briggs	Briggs 2/2	650 (Est.)	Report
29 January 2012	Pre Season	Hull F.C.	A	KC Stadium	L	6–46	Crookes	Gale 1/1	3,100 (Est.)	Report

== Player appearances ==
- Friendly Games Only

FB=Fullback	C=Centre	W=Winger	SO=Stand Off	SH=Scrum half	P=Prop	H=Hooker	SR=Second row	LF=Loose forward	B=Bench

No	Player	1	2	3	4
1	Brett Kearney	x	FB	x	FB
2	Adrian Purtell	x	C	x	C
3	Keith Lulia	x			
4	Chev Walker	C	B	x	C
5	Elliot Kear			x	W
6	Ben Jeffries	SH	SO	x	SO
7	Luke Gale	x	SH	x	SH
8	Nick Scruton	x	B	x	P
9	Heath L'Estrange	x	x	x	x
10	Craig Kopczak	x	B	x	x
11	Olivier Elima				
12	Elliott Whitehead	Red card	Red card	Red card	Red card
13	Jamie Langley	L	B	x	L
14	Matt Diskin	x	H	x	H
15	Bryn Hargreaves	P	P	x	P
16	Manase Manuokafoa				
17	Ian Sibbit	SR	SR	x	SR
18	Shaun Ainscough	W	W	W	x
19	Tom Olbison	SR			
20	James Donaldson	B	B	x	B
21	Tom Burgess	x	B	x	B
22	Jarrod Sammut	x	x	x	B
23	Danny Addy	B	L	L	x
24	Jason Crookes	W	W	x	W
25	Adam O'Brien	H	B	x	B
26	John Bateman	B	SR	x	SR
27	Kyle Briggs	SO	B	SO	x
28	Paul Sykes	FB	B	x	B
29	Michael Platt	C	C	x	B
30	Liam McAvoy	B	B	P	x
31	Alex Ball	x	x	x	x
32	Jobe Murphy	B	B	SR	x
33	Karl Pryce	x			
34	Phil Joseph	P	P	x	B

= Injured

= Suspended

== Table ==
Super League XVII
Pos	Team	Pld	W	D	L	PF	PA	PD	Pts	Qualification
1	Wigan Warriors (L)	27	21	0	6	994	449	+545	42	Play-offs
2	Warrington Wolves	27	20	1	6	909	539	+370	41	Play-offs
3	St Helens	27	17	2	8	795	480	+315	36	Play-offs
4	Catalans Dragons	27	18	0	9	812	611	+201	36	Play-offs
5	Leeds Rhinos (C)	27	16	0	11	823	662	+161	32	Play-offs
6	Hull F.C.	27	15	2	10	696	621	+75	32	Play-offs
7	Huddersfield Giants	27	14	0	13	699	664	+35	28	Play-offs
8	Wakefield Trinity Wildcats	27	13	0	14	633	764	−131	26	Play-offs
9	Bradford Bulls	27	14	1	12	633	756	−123	23 (Note: Bradford Bulls deducted 6 points on 25 July 2012 for entering administration)	
10	Hull Kingston Rovers	27	10	1	16	753	729	+24	21	
11	Salford City Reds	27	8	1	18	618	844	−226	17	
12	London Broncos	27	7	0	20	588	890	−302	14	
13	Castleford Tigers	27	6	0	21	554	948	−394	12	
14	Widnes Vikings	27	6	0	21	532	1082	−550	12	

Source: superleague.co.uk and BBC Sport.
Rules for classification: 1st on competition points; 2nd on match points difference.
Competition points: for win = 2; for draw = 1; for loss = 0.
(C) Champions; (L) League Leaders' Shield Winners

== 2012 fixtures and results ==
Legend
Win
Draw
Loss

2012 Stobart Super League

Date	Competition	Rnd	Vrs	H/A	Venue	Result	Score	Tries	Goals	Att	Live on TV	Report
5 February 2012	Super League XVII	1	Catalans Dragons	H	Odsal Stadium	L	12-34	Kear, Langley	Gale 2/2	10,610	-	Report
12 February 2012	Super League XVII	2	Castleford Tigers	A	The Jungle	W	20-12	Burgess, Kearney, Sammut	Gale 4/4	8,054	-	Report
19 February 2012	Super League XVII	3	Wigan Warriors	H	Odsal Stadium	L	16-54	Crookes, Kearney, Sammut	Sammut 2/3	12,909	-	Report
25 February 2012	Super League XVII	4	Wakefield Trinity Wildcats	A	Belle Vue	W	36-18	Whitehead (3), Kearney (2), Lulia	Sammut 6/6	6,934	Sky Sports	Report
3 March 2012	Super League XVII	5	Warrington Wolves	H	Odsal Stadium	L	10-23	Crookes, Diskin	Sammut 1/2	11,318	Sky Sports	Report
10 March 2012	Super League XVII	6	Hull Kingston Rovers	A	Craven Park	W	36-24	Crookes (3), Diskin, Kearney, Lulia, Pryce	Sammut 4/7	7,486	Sky Sports	Report
17 March 2012	Super League XVII	7	St. Helens	H	Odsal Stadium	W	12-8	Pryce, Whitehead	Sykes 2/3	11,360	Sky Sports	Report
25 March 2012	Super League XVII	8	Salford City Reds	H	Odsal Stadium	L	18-38	Hargreaves, Kearney, Whitehead	Sammut 3/3	11,290	-	Report
30 March 2012	Super League XVII	9	Hull F.C.	A	KC Stadium	L	18-24	Bateman, Lulia, Pryce	Sammut 3/3	11,673	-	Report
6 April 2012	Super League XVII	10	Leeds Rhinos	H	Odsal Stadium	W	12-4	Jeffries, Langley	Sammut 2/2	20,851	-	Report
9 April 2012	Super League XVII	11	Widnes Vikings	A	Halton Stadium	W	38-4	Platt (2), Jeffries, Kopczak, Lulia, Manuokafoa, Purtell	Sammut 4/6, Addy 1/1	5,687	-	Report
22 April 2012	Super League XVII	12	Huddersfield Giants	H	Odsal Stadium	L	6-20	Platt	Addy 1/1, Jeffries 0/1	11,182	-	Report
6 May 2012	Super League XVII	13	London Broncos	A	Brisbane Road	W	29-22	Platt (4), Pryce	Gale 4/6, Gale 1 DG	2,844	-	Report
18 May 2012	Super League XVII	14	Salford City Reds	A	City of Salford Stadium	D	20-20	Pryce (3), Burgess	Gale 2/4	6,829	-	Report
26 May 2012	Magic Weekend	15	Leeds Rhinos	N	Etihad Stadium	L	22-37	Diskin, Jeffries, Kear, Whitehead	Gale 3/4	32,953	Sky Sports	Report
4 June 2012	Super League XVII	16	Castleford Tigers	H	Odsal Stadium	W	46-32	Ainscough (3), Kearney (2), Bateman, Elima, Lulia	Gale 7/8	10,906	Sky Sports	Report
8 June 2012	Super League XVII	17	St. Helens	A	Langtree Park	L	0-54	-	-	13,025	-	Report
24 June 2012	Super League XVII	18	Wakefield Trinity Wildcats	H	Odsal Stadium	W	34-26	Lulia (2), Ainscough, Elima, Whitehead	Gale 7/7	11,236	-	Report
29 June 2012	Super League XVII	19	Wigan Warriors	A	DW Stadium	W	30-22	Pryce (2), Kearney, Lulia, Whitehead	Gale 5/5	19,628	-	Report
8 July 2012	Super League XVII	20	London Broncos	H	Odsal Stadium	W	44-12	Kearney (4), Gale, Manuokafoa, Platt, Whitehead	Gale 6/8	10,132	-	Report
20 July 2012	Super League XVII	21	Leeds Rhinos	A	Headingley Stadium	L	16-34	Elima, Pryce, Whitehead	Gale 2/3	18,520	-	Report
29 July 2012	Super League XVII	22	Warrington Wolves	A	Halliwell Jones Stadium	L	22-50	Addy (2), Pryce, Whitehead	Gale 3/4	10,750	-	Report
5 August 2012	Super League XVII	23	Widnes Vikings	H	Odsal Stadium	W	38-26	Ainscough (2), Platt (2), Jeffries, Kearney, L'Estrange	Gale 5/7	10,261	-	Report
10 August 2012	Super League XVII	24	Hull Kingston Rovers	H	Odsal Stadium	W	32-26	Langley (2), Ainscough, Crookes, Whitehead	Gale 6/6	10,217	Sky Sports	Report
19 August 2012	Super League XVII	25	Huddersfield Giants	A	Galpharm Stadium	W	34-12	Pryce (2), Ainscough, Diskin, Gale, Kearney	Gale 5/6	7,477	-	Report
1 September 2012	Super League XVII	26	Hull F.C.	H	Odsal Stadium	L	6-70	Crookes	Gale 1/1	10,616	Sky Sports	Report
8 September 2012	Super League XVII	27	Catalans Dragons	A	Stade Gilbert Brutus	L	26-50	Sammut (4), Platt	Gale 3/5	9,254	Sky Sports	Report

== Player appearances ==
- Super League Only

FB=Fullback	C=Centre	W=Winger	SO=Stand-off	SH=Scrum half	PR=Prop	H=Hooker	SR=Second row	L=Loose forward	B=Bench

No	Player	1	2	3	4	5	6	7	8	9	10	11	12	13	14	15	16	17	18	19	20	21	22	23	24	25	26	27
1	Brett Kearney	FB	FB	FB	FB	FB	FB	FB	FB	FB	FB	FB				FB	FB		FB	FB	FB	SO		FB	FB	FB	FB	FB
2	Adrian Purtell	C	C					C		C	C	C	W			C												
3	Keith Lulia			C	C	C	C	C	C	C	C	C	C	C	C	C	C	C	C	C	C	C	C	C	C	C	C	C
4	Chev Walker	C	C	SR			C	SR	SR							B				B	B	B	B	B	B	B	B	B
5	Elliot Kear	W	W	W	W	W								FB	FB	W												W
6	Ben Jeffries				SH	SH	SH	SH	SH		SH	SH	SO	SO	SO	SO	SO	SO	SO		SO			SO	SO	SO	SO	x
7	Luke Gale	SH	SH	SH										SH	SH	SH	SH	SH	SH	SH	SH	SH	SH	SH	SH	SH	SH	SH
8	Nick Scruton	B	B	B	B	x	B																B					B
9	Heath L'Estrange	B	B	B	B	B	B	B	B	B	B	B		B	B	B	H	H	H	H	H	H	H	H	H	H	H	H
10	Craig Kopczak	P	P	P	P	P						B	B	P	P	P							B	P	P	P	P	x
11	Olivier Elima							B		B	SR	SR	SR	L	SR	L	L	L	P	P		SR					B	L
12	Elliott Whitehead	Red card	SR	SR	SR	SR	SR	SR	SR	SR	SR	SR	SR	SR	SR	SR	B	C	SR	SR	SR	SR	SR	SR	SR	SR	SR	SR
13	Jamie Langley	L	L	L	L	L	L		L	L	L	L	L	SR	L			P	L	L	L	L	L	L	L	L	L	
14	Matt Diskin	H	H	H	H	H	H	H	H	H	H	H	H	H	H	H									B	B	B	B
15	Bryn Hargreaves	P	P	P	P	P	P	P	P	P	P	P	P	P	P	P	P	P	P	Red card	P	P	P	P	P	P	P	P
16	Manase Manuokafoa					B	P	P	P	P	P	P	P	B	B	B	P	B	B	P	P	P	P	B	B	B	B	P
17	Ian Sibbit	SR	SR														B	B										
18	Shaun Ainscough										W	W	W	W	W		W	W	W	W	W	W	W	W	W	W	W	x
19	Tom Olbison	x	x	x	x	x	x	x	x	x	x	B	B				SR	SR	B	B	B	B	SR	SR	SR		SR	SR
20	James Donaldson	B	B																									
21	Tom Burgess	B	B	B	B	B	B	B	B	B	B		B	B	B	B	B	B	B	B	B	B	B	B	B	B		
22	Jarrod Sammut	SO	SO	SO	SO	SO	SO		SO	SO	SO	SO							B	SO		FB	FB					SO
23	Danny Addy	x	x	x	x	x	B	B	B	SH	B	B	SH	B	B		B	B	x	x	x	x	SO	B				
24	Jason Crookes	W	W	W	W	W	W	W	W	W															W	W	W	W
25	Adam O'Brien	x	x	x	x	x	x	x	x	x	x	x	x	x	x	x	x	x	x	B	B	B	x	x	x	x	x	x
26	John Bateman	SR			SR	SR	SR	L	B	SR	Red card	Red card	B	Red card	Red card	SR	SR	SR	SR	SR	SR					SR		
27	Kyle Briggs	x	x	x	x	x	x	x	x	x	x	x	x	x	x	x	x	x	x	x	x	x	x	x	x	x	x	x
28	Paul Sykes	x	x	x	x	x	x	SO	C	x	x	x	x	x	x	x	x	x	x	x	x	x	x	x	x	x	x	x
29	Michael Platt	x	x	C	C	C	x	x	x	x	x	W	C	C	C		C	FB	C	C	C	C	C	C	C			C
30	Liam McAvoy	x	x	x	x	x	x	x	x	x	x	x	x	x	x	x	x	x	x	x	x	x	x	x	x	x	x	x
31	Alex Ball	x	x	x	x	x	x	x	x	x	x	x	x	x	x	x	x	x	x	x	x	x	x	x	x	x	x	x
32	Jobe Murphy	x	x	x	x	x	x	x	x	x	x	x	x	x	x	x	x	x	x	x	x	x	x	x	x	x	x	x
33	Karl Pryce	x	x	x	x	x	W	W	W	W	W		FB	W	W	W	W	W	W	W	W	W	W	W		C	C	x
34	Phil Joseph	x	x	B	B	B				B	B																	B

= Injured

= Suspended

== Challenge Cup ==
Legend
Win
Draw
Loss

Date	Competition	Rnd	Vrs	H/A	Venue	Result	Score	Tries	Goals	Att	TV	Report
15 April 2012	Cup	4th	Doncaster RLFC	H	Odsal Stadium	W	72-6	Ainscough (3), Whitehead (3), Diskin (2), Lulia (2), Bateman, Jeffries, Kopczak	Addy 10/13	3,210	-	Report
28 April 2012	Cup	5th	Warrington Wolves	A	Halliwell Jones Stadium	L	16-32	Elima, Lulia, Purtell	Gale 2/3	5,505	BBC Sport	Report

== Player appearances ==
- Challenge Cup Games only

FB=Fullback	C=Centre	W=Winger	SO=Stand Off	SH=Scrum half	PR=Prop	H=Hooker	SR=Second row	L=Loose forward	B=Bench

No	Player	4	5
1	Brett Kearney		
2	Adrian Purtell	FB	W
3	Keith Lulia	C	C
4	Chev Walker		
5	Elliot Kear		
6	Ben Jeffries	SO	SO
7	Luke Gale		SH
8	Nick Scruton	B	
9	Heath L'Estrange		B
10	Craig Kopczak	B	P
11	Olivier Elima	SR	SR
12	Elliott Whitehead	C	C
13	Jamie Langley	L	L
14	Matt Diskin	H	H
15	Bryn Hargreaves	P	P
16	Manase Manuokafoa	P	B
17	Ian Sibbit		
18	Shaun Ainscough	W	W
19	Tom Olbison	SR	
20	James Donaldson		
21	Tom Burgess		B
22	Jarrod Sammut		
23	Danny Addy	SH	B
24	Jason Crookes		
25	Adam O'Brien	x	x
26	John Bateman	B	SR
27	Kyle Briggs	x	x
28	Paul Sykes	x	x
29	Michael Platt	W	x
30	Liam McAvoy	x	x
31	Alex Ball	x	x
32	Jobe Murphy	x	x
33	Karl Pryce		FB
34	Phil Joseph		
37	Callum Windley	B	x

== 2012 squad statistics ==
- Appearances and points include (Super League, Challenge Cup and Play-offs) as of 8 September 2012.

No	Player	Position	Age	Previous club	Apps	Tries	Goals	DG	Points
1	Brett Kearney	Fullback	28	Cronulla Sharks	22	15	0	0	60
2	Adrian Purtell	Wing	27	Penrith Panthers	10	2	0	0	8
3	Keith Lulia	Centre	24	Newcastle Knights	27	11	0	0	44
4	Chev Walker	Centre	29	Hull Kingston Rovers	16	0	0	0	0
5	Elliot Kear	Wing	23	Crusaders	9	2	0	0	8
6	Ben Jeffries	Stand off	31	Wakefield Trinity Wildcats	21	5	0	0	20
7	Luke Gale	Scrum-half	23	Harlequins RL	19	2	67	1	143
8	Nick Scruton	Prop	27	Leeds Rhinos	8	0	0	0	0
9	Heath L'Estrange	Hooker	26	Manly Sea Eagles	27	1	0	0	4
10	Craig Kopczak	Prop	25	Bradford Bulls Academy	17	2	0	0	8
11	Olivier Elima	Second row	28	Catalans Dragons	17	4	0	0	16
12	Elliott Whitehead	Second row	22	Bradford Bulls Academy	28	15	0	0	60
13	Jamie Langley	Loose forward	28	Bradford Bulls Academy	25	4	0	0	16
14	Matt Diskin	Hooker	30	Leeds Rhinos	21	6	0	0	24
15	Bryn Hargreaves	Prop	26	St Helens R.F.C.	28	1	0	0	4
16	Manase Manuokafoa	Prop	26	Parramatta Eels	25	2	0	0	8
17	Ian Sibbit	Second row	31	Salford City Reds	4	0	0	0	0
18	Shaun Ainscough	Wing	22	Wigan Warriors	18	11	0	0	44
19	Tom Olbison	Second row	20	Bradford Bulls Academy	14	0	0	0	0
20	James Donaldson	Loose forward	20	Bradford Bulls Academy	2	0	0	0	0
21	Tom Burgess	Prop	19	Bradford Bulls Academy	25	2	0	0	8
22	Jarrod Sammut	Scrum-half	25	Crusaders	15	6	25	0	74
23	Danny Addy	Loose forward	21	Bradford Bulls Academy	15	2	12	0	32
24	Jason Crookes	Centre	21	Bradford Bulls Academy	13	7	0	0	28
25	Adam O'Brien	Hooker	18	Bradford Bulls Academy	3	0	0	0	0
26	John Bateman	Loose forward	18	Bradford Bulls Academy	17	3	0	0	12
27	Kyle Briggs	Stand off	24	Featherstone Rovers	0	0	0	0	0
28	Paul Sykes	Centre	30	Harlequins RL	2	0	2	0	4
29	Michael Platt	Centre	27	Castleford Tigers	18	11	0	0	44
30	Liam McAvoy	Prop	20	Bradford Bulls Academy	0	0	0	0	0
31	Jobe Murphy	Fullback	18	Bradford Bulls Academy	0	0	0	0	0
32	Alex Ball	Prop	19	Bradford Bulls Academy	0	0	0	0	0
33	Karl Pryce	Wing	25	Wigan Warriors	20	13	0	0	52
34	Phil Joseph	Prop	27	Swinton Lions	6	0	0	0	0
37	Callum Windley	Hooker	21	Bradford Bulls Academy	1	0	0	0	0

= Injured = Suspended

== 2012 transfers in/out ==
In

	Name	Position	Signed from	Date
(Cook Islands)	Keith Lulia	Centre	Newcastle Knights	July 2011
(England)	Luke Gale	Scrum half	Harlequins RL	July 2011
(Malta)	Jarrod Sammut	Stand off	Crusaders RL	July 2011
(Australia)	Adrian Purtell	Centre	Penrith Panthers	August 2011
(Wales)	Elliot Kear	Wing	Crusaders	October 2011
(Tonga)	Manase Manuokafoa	Prop	Parramatta Eels	October 2011
(England)	Karl Pryce	Wing	Wigan Warriors	January 2012
(England)	Phil Joseph	Prop	Swinton Lions	January 2012

Out

	Name	Position	Club Signed	Date
(New Zealand)	Patrick Ah Van	Wing	Widnes Vikings	August 2011
(Australia)	Shad Royston	Fullback	Pia Donkeys	August 2011
(Australia)	Marc Herbert	Scrum half	Retirement	September 2011
(England)	Andy Lynch	Prop	Hull F.C.	September 2011
(England)	Vinny Finigan	Wing	Sheffield Eagles	October 2011
(England)	Steve Crossley	Prop	Dewsbury Rams	October 2011
(England)	Gareth Raynor	Wing	Featherstone Rovers	December 2011
