= 2011 Bradford Bulls season =

- Super League XVI Rank: 10th
- Play-off result: Did not qualify
- Challenge Cup: Round 5
- 2011 record: Wins: 10; draws: 2; losses: 17
- Points scored: For: 638; against: 886

Team information
- Chairman: Peter Hood
- Head coach: Mick Potter
- Captain: Andy Lynch
- Stadium: Odsal Stadium
- Avg. attendance: 12,814
- High attendance: 19,275 vs. Leeds Rhinos

Top scorers
- Tries: Patrick Ah Van & Shad Royston (12)
- Goals: Patrick Ah Van (97)
- Points: Patrick Ah Van (242)
← 2010	List of seasons	2012 →

This article details the Bradford Bulls rugby league football club's 2011 season, the sixteenth season of the Super League era.

== Season review ==
August 2010

Bradford Bulls started the build-up for the 2011 Super League season by announcing the departure of centre Chris Nero, who was offered a new contract but turned it down to join Salford City Reds and also Mick Potter's decision to not renew the contract of the ageing Steve Menzies who was then offered a one-year contract at the Catalans Dragons which he accepted. The recruitment started with the announcement of Paul Sykes and Jamie Langley accepting another three-year deal to stay at the Bulls. Potter also renewed Craig Kopczak's contract and gave a professional contract to up and coming winger Vinny Finigan. The Bulls also kept talented youngsters Elliott Whitehead by giving him a three-year deal after a solid 2010 season and a three-year contract to up-and-coming hooker Adam O'Brien who will be looking to play his debut for the Bulls this season.

September 2010

The Bulls finally announced a replacement for Nero in the form of Chev Walker from Hull Kingston Rovers. To boost the wings he also brought in Wigan Warriors youngster Shaun Ainscough and New Zealand Warriors young winger Patrick Ah Van. With the Bulls lacking that extra push in the forwards last season, the signings of Bryn Hargreaves from St Helens R.F.C. and Olivier Elima from Catalans Dragons will provide that. Another problem with the Bulls last season is that the squad did not really have any experience and the depth so they have signed experienced second rower Ian Sibbit from Salford City Reds, Sibbit will be in his 13th season, with six of them spent at Salford. Youngster Joe Wardle who made his debut last year for the Bulls has rejected a new contract and will pursue a career at Huddersfield Giants. The Bulls have also let Rikki Sheriffe and Stuart Reardon go after both had a very poor season in 2010. To provide more depth in the 3/4 line the Bulls handed a career lifeline to the recently jailed winger Gareth Raynor whose previous club was Crusaders and an excellent player from the Championship in the form of Shad Royston from Halifax. Jamie Langley, Nick Scruton, Paul Sykes and Andy Lynch have all been included in the preliminary England RL squad in the buildup to the 2010 Four Nations. The Bulls have also given 2-year contracts to youngsters Jason Crookes, Steve Crossley and Danny Addy.

October 2010

Incoming coach Mick Potter finished his 2010 season with a 22–10 loss to Wigan Warriors (the 2010 Super League Grand Final) in his final game for St. Helens before joining the Bulls in 2011. On 4 October Peter Hood announced that the Bulls had succeeded reaching their 10,000 pledge scheme making the Bulls the cheapest team to watch in super league. The Bulls also added to their backroom staff by announcing they had acquired assistant coach Francis Cummins from rivals Leeds Rhinos. A 9th player was acquired in the form of hooker Matt Diskin who signed a 3-year contract with the Bulls from arch rivals Leeds. The first player to leave the Bulls in October was 19-year-old second rower Andy Tate who signed for Yorkshire rivals Wakefield Trinity Wildcats. The Magic Weekend fixtures were announced and the Bulls will play against arch rivals Leeds Rhinos on Sunday 13 February 2011 to kick off their season. While in Australia Mick Potter searched for a replacement for Matt Orford who wishes to return to the NRL with either Canberra Raiders or Parramatta Eels. As his replacement Aussie Marc Herbert was signed on a 1 Year Deal from Canberra Raiders.

November 2010

Stuart Reardon was signed by Iestyn Harris to play for the Crusaders in the 2011 season. On 10 November Prop Danny Sculthorpe left the Bulls by mutual consent due to a re-occurring injury. A couple of months after signing a new 1-year deal Michael Worrincy signed for NRL side Penrith Panthers. Castleford Tigers brought out their pre-season friendly fixtures and it is revealed that they will play the Bulls on boxing day (26 December) at The Jungle with a kick off time of 12pm also the Bulls will play Halifax on 9 January at Grattan Stadium for Jamie Langley's testimonial and that will kick off at 3pm. Dewsbury Rams also announced they will play Bradford on 23 January 2011 at Rams Stadium also at 3pm. The Bulls also confirmed they will be playing Wakefield Trinity Wildcats on 30 January at Odsal Stadium with a 3pm kick off. The Bradford Bulls 2011 playing kits were revealed on 17 November with the Home strip being white and the Away purple also JCT600 renewed their partnership with the Bulls. The 2011 Super League fixtures were announced on 22 November at 00:01 am. The Bulls announce yet another pre season friendly against Keighley Cougars at Cougar Park on 28 January 2011 with a 7:30pm kick off.

December 2010

It was announced that youngster George Burgess would follow in the footsteps of his older brother Sam and join the South Sydney Rabbitohs for 2011. Mick Potter also confirmed that Andy Lynch would retain the captaincy for 2011 and Jamie Langley would retain the vice captaincy, Speaking in the T&A on 16 December, Potter said "There won't be too many changes on who the leaders are I don't think. There's quite a stable bunch of senior players and, in most likelihood, Andy Lynch will be captain next year". Salford City Reds signed Bulls hooker Wayne Godwin on a 3-year deal as their hooker Tevita Leo-Latu was refused a visa plus the Boxing Day friendly against Castleford was cancelled due to a frozen pitch and will not be played on another date.

January 2011

The Bulls release second rower Glenn Hall from his contract, which he had 2 years left on, so he could return to Australia for the birth of his child. The 20-man squad for the match against Halifax was revealed with new signings Patrick Ah Van, Gareth Raynor, Shad Royston, Marc Herbert, Bryn Hargreaves, Shaun Ainscough, Ian Sibbit and Chev Walker all making their debuts. The Bulls beat the Championship Grand Final winners 50–8 with tries from Raynor, Heath L'Estrange scored a double, Herbert, Royston, Jason Crookes, John Bateman, Michael Platt and Elliott Whitehead, Herbert kicked a goal and Ah Van kicked 6. The Bulls 2010 superstar signing Matt Orford Finally got a 1-year deal with Canberra Raiders after many months of legal disputes which means the Bulls can announce 23-year-old Stand Off Kyle Briggs (on a 2-year deal) from Featherstone Rovers as their 11th new recruit. On 13 January the Bulls announced the squad numbers for the 2011 season. They travelled to Lanzarote for 1 week for an intense training camp, during the camp Glenn Hall signed a 2-year contract with NRL team North Queensland Cowboys. It is revealed that Formula One ace Mark Webber spent a day training with the Bulls in their warm weather camp. The 20-man squad for the game against Dewsbury Rams was announced with new signings Matt Diskin, Olivier Elima and Kyle Briggs all making their debuts, Nick Scruton returns from injury to play. The Bulls are made to fight for their 46–12 win with tries coming from Diskin, a double from Vinny Finigan, Ah Van, Steve Crossley, Platt and youngsters Reed and McKay, Ah Van kicked 7 out of 8. The squads for the game against Keighley Cougars and Wakefield Trinity Wildcats was announced with youngsters Cain Southernwood, Finigan, Bateman and Crookes featuring against the Cougars, Brett Kearney is set to play his first game in 2011 against the Wildcats. The youthful Bulls side lost 46–12 against the Cougars with tries coming from Bateman, Southernwood and Finigan. Bradford then beat Wakefield in the final pre-season match 40–16 with tries coming from L'Estrange, Kearney, a double from the ever impressive Ah Van, Platt, Paul Sykes and Elima, Ah Van kicked 4 goals whilst Herbert and Briggs kicked 1 each.

February 2011

Rikki Sheriffe signed a 2-year contract with rugby union side Newcastle Falcons, meanwhile Danny Sculthorpe joins Widnes Vikings after a short trial period. Also Steve Ganson was appointed to ref the game against Leeds Rhinos at Millennium Magic. The squad for the Millennium Magic was released with only Marc Herbert missing (hamstring strain) out of all 11 new signings. The Bulls looked liked they had improved a lot but due to a controversial decision the Bulls lost 32–28 to local rivals Leeds Rhinos with Whitehead scoring 3 tries, Matt Diskin scoring against his former club and Ah Van scoring after going 80 m after he intercepted a Brent Webb pass, Ah Van kicked 4 goals from 5 attempts. Jamie Langley and Kyle Briggs were injured during the game against Leeds and so were not included in the squad against Wigan Warriors while Marc Herbert is still injured. The Bulls were overpowered 44–10 by the Super League champions with Whitehead and Ah Van scoring for Bradford whilst Ah Van kicked a conversion. Bradford recorded their first win of the 2011 campaign beating the Crusaders 30–26, tries from Andy Lynch, Shad Royston and Shaun Ainscough made sure the Bulls were 18–6 up at half time, second half tries came from the 2 hookers Matt Diskin and Heath L'Estrange, also Patrick Ah Van kicked all 5 goals to make sure the Bulls won. L'Estrange and Chev Walker picked up injuries, Walker is out for about a month and L'Estrange is out for 6 weeks.

March 2011

The month started pretty well for the Bulls as they comfortably beat the Wakefield Trinity Wildcats 40–18, youngster Tom Olbison scored the Bulls 1st try, Craig Kopczak grabbed his first ever hat-trick, Shad Royston scored 2 tries and winger Shaun Ainscough scored a try. Patrick Ah Van was in good form with the boot as usual kicking 6 out of 7. However this victory was short lived as the Bulls came crashing down to earth with a very poor performance the next week resulting in a 50–16 loss to Huddersfield Giants, the Bulls gave a debut to 17-year-old hooker Adam O'Brien who did not look out of place when he came off the bench. Shaun Ainscough scored his 3rd try in 3 games and Marc Herbert and Gareth Raynor also grabbed their first tries for the club. Ah Van kicked 2 from 3. The Bulls bounced back the following week against the unbeaten Castleford Tigers with Olivier Elima scoring his first try for the club and Nick Scruton getting a double helping the Bulls to an 18–14 win, Ah Van was on target with all his attempts kicking 3 from 3. The 2011 Challenge Cup draw for the 4th round occurred a few hours after the Castleford game and the Bulls got an away tie against local Championship side Halifax on 8 May 2011, which was shown on the BBC. The next game for the Bulls was against St. Helens at the Halton Stadium, the Saints won the game 28–16 with a little help from the referee Richard Silverwood, and the Bulls tries came from Ah Van and Ainscough (who got a double) with Ah Van kicking 2 from 3. Also Prop forward Nick Scruton signed a 3-year contract to stay with the Bulls until 2014.

April 2011

Youngster Tom Burgess made his long-awaited debut in the 24–22 win over Harlequins, although the Bulls played well in parts they never really got out of first gear and just managed to hold onto a win. Olivier Elima opened the Bulls scoring with Matt Diskin, Brett Kearney and Paul Sykes all finding the try line. Patrick Ah Van kicked 3 from 4 and also slotted over a penalty kick to ensure the Bulls came away with 2 points. Bradford's next game was against struggling Hull FC, after playing well in the first half silly errors let Hull back in the game and they beat the Bulls 34–24 with tries from Sykes, Chev Walker scoring his first for the Bulls and Shad Royston who got a double. Ah Van contributed 8 points by kicking all 4 goals. Academy product Tom Olbison signed a new three-year deal keeping him at the Bulls until 2014, also Michael Platt signed a new two-year contract, keeping him at the club until 2013. The Bulls travelled to The Willows to play the Salford City Reds, they started off well when captain Andy Lynch went over for a try with Marc Herbert converting but poor tackling and appalling ball handling allowed Salford to lead 24–10 at the break. The Bulls came out with a bit of fight and Aussie recruit Herbert went in for a try, Herbert got his second near the end of the game and converted but after a poor performance the Bulls were on the end of a 56–16 defeat. The Bulls then faced arch-rivals Leeds Rhinos at home, early tries from Ah Van and Lynch put the Bulls 10–0 up but they eventually succumbed to the Rhinos fightback and lost 22–30 with Elima scoring 2 and Ah Van kicking 3 from 5. Four days later the Bulls travelled to the south of France to face the Catalans Dragons, youngster John Bateman made his debut starting at Loose forward however Bradford drew with the Dragons 8–8 with hooker Heath L'Estrange scoring the only try for the Bulls with Ah Van kicking 2 from 3.

May 2011

May did not start well for the Bulls as they were absolutely destroyed by a visiting Warrington Wolves side, the Bulls' errors gifted the Wolves an early lead and Warrington went into halftime 32–0 up. The second half the Bulls again coughed up the ball and a good Wolves side capitalised on the mistakes. The game ended up 58–14 to Warrington with the Bulls producing something with tries from Andy Lynch, Craig Kopczak and Elliott Whitehead. Patrick Ah Van kicked 1 goal. With the Bulls suffering injuries and having problems in the halves, Mick Potter signed former Bull Ben Jeffries, from Wakefield Trinity Wildcats on a 1 1/2-year deal. Jeffries can play either half back position. The Bulls went through to Round 5 of the Challenge Cup after beating Halifax 46–34, Bradford did not play well at all with tries coming from Royston, Platt, Ah Van, Sibbit, Burgess, Whitehead and a double from Raynor. The draw for Round 5 happened on 8 May and the Bulls are playing SL champions Wigan Warriors at Odsal Stadium on 22 May. Things got bad to worse for the Bulls as they lost 46–18 to fellow strugglers Hull Kingston Rovers, Kyle Briggs scored his first try for the Bulls and tries from Raynor and Lynch was all the Bulls could muster (Ah Van kicked all 3 goals). The following week the Bulls faced Super League champions Wigan, playing with 12 men after Gareth Raynor was sent off. Wigan won 26–22 but the Bulls had tries coming from Whitehead, Royston and a double from Ah Van who also kicked 3 goals. Winger Raynor received a £300 fine and a 2-match ban for the red-carded challenge on Wigan's Sam Tomkins. Bradford faced Salford City Reds the following week and avenged their 56–16 loss to Salford by beating thm 28–14 at Odsal Stadium, Scrum half Briggs scored 2 tries, whilst halfback partner Jeffies got one with additional tries coming from Hooker Heath L'Estrange and Winger Paul Sykes, Ah Van kicked 4 goals.

June 2011

The Bulls travelled to the Capital to face fellow strugglers Harlequins RL; this was a must win for the Bulls if they wanted to keep within touching distance of the playoffs. Marc Herbert replaced Kyle Briggs and prop Bryn Hargreaves suffered an ankle injury. Also youngster Danny Addy made his return to the first team. Bradford won the game 30–16 with Centre Patrick Ah Van scoring 2 tries and kicking 2 goals, other Centre Elliott Whitehead scored a try and in his best game in a Bradford shirt Full back Shad Royston went 90 m to score. The points were rounded up with a late try from front rower Andy Lynch. Aussie Hooker Heath L'Estrange signed a new three-year deal, keeping him at the Bulls until 2014. The Bulls were aiming to win three in a row for the first time since April 2010 against visitors St Helens R.F.C. It was a very rainy evening and Saints scored an early try; however the Bulls came away with a draw, a last-minute penalty given away by Lynch allowed Jamie Foster to make the final score 14–14, Fullback Brett Kearney scored on his return and so did captain Lynch. Ah Van kicked 3 goals from 4. Aussie Kearney also signed a new three-year deal at the Bulls. Half back Kyle Briggs went out on loan for a month at strugglers Harlequins RL. Bradford announced their first signing for the 2012 season in the form of Newcastle Knights centre Keith Lulia. Bradford hosted fellow playoff contenders Hull F.C. at Odsal, Hull managed to dominate the Bradford pack and won the game 28–14, the Bulls tryscorers were Royston with 2 and captain Lynch, Ah Van kicked a goal. The Bulls won their first game at Headingley Stadium since 2007 with a hard-fought 18–12 victory against arch-rivals Leeds Rhinos, second-rower Olivier Elima scored 2 tries for Bradford and Ah Van kicked 5 goals. Bradford Bulls terminated the contact of academy product Dave Halley, he immediately joined local Championship 1 side Keighley Cougars on a short term deal.

July 2011

July kicked off with a 28–34 loss to French team Catalans Dragons, veteran and former Bulls favourite Steve Menzies tore his former club to pieces with superb handling and great defence. Olivier Elima scored against his former club and other Bulls tries came from youngster Tom Burgess, Ben Jeffries and Gareth Raynor. Patrick Ah Van kicked 6 goals. Bradford's play-off hopes were given a major knock back as the Bulls went down 30–34 against Castleford Tigers. Brett Kearney scored 2 tries followed by tries from Raynor, the returning top try scorer Shad Royston took his tally to 11 and Paul Sykes crossed the line too. Ah Van kicked 5 from 5. It was announced that veteran winger Gareth Raynor has signed a new 1-year deal making him a Bull for 2012. In response to the defeat at Castleford the Bulls sensationally beat title contenders Huddersfield Giants 36–0, the Bulls outstanding defence and good attack won this game with tries coming from Sykes (who scored 2), Jeffries, Michael Platt, Ah Van and Kearney. Ah Van kicked 4 goals and Sykes kicked 2. The Bulls announce a second signing for 2012 in the form of Harlequins RL halfback Luke Gale on a 2-year deal. The Rugby Football League announce that the Bulls received a Grade B license for 2012–2014 and that Crusaders withdrew their application. In light of this news the Bulls quickly snapped up halfback Jarrod Sammut on a one-year deal. Bradford came crashing down to earth as the Warrington Wolves were rampant and murdered the Bulls 64–6 with the points coming from Ah Van.

August 2011

Leading point scorer Patrick Ah Van signed for Super League newcomers Widnes Vikings on a teo-year deal. Hooker Matt Diskin played 10 weeks with a shoulder injury and needs surgery on it and will miss the rest of the season. The Bulls announce the signing of Aussie winger/centre Adrian Purtell from Penrith Panthers on a 3 Year Deal. Winger Shaun Ainscough signed a new one-year deal with the Bulls while fullback Shad Royston is set to join Pia Donkeys in the French league. Fellow playoff contenders Hull Kingston Rovers travelled to Odsal Stadium to try move 4 points clear of the Bulls. They succeeded with a 34–8 win, with only Marc Herbert scoring a try and Ah Van kicking 2 goals. Reigning Super League champions Wigan Warriors ripped the Bulls apart 60–12 with youngster John Bateman scoring his first professional try and academy product Craig Kopczak also crossed the line. Ah Van kicked 2 goals.

September 2011

The Bulls played their last home game of the season against Crusaders a game which they won 48–24 with Olivier Elima scoring two, Brett Kearney scoring two, Kopczak, Shaun Ainscough, Ah Van and Andy Lynch also scored with Ah Van kicking 8 goals. The Bulls rounded off a depressing season with a 26–14 loss against Wakefield Trinity Wildcats, Kyle Briggs, Ainscough and Shad Royston all scored with Ah Van kicking one goal. The Bulls equalled their lowest ever finish, finishing 10th in the league, however they did get one more point than the previous year.

== 2011 milestones ==
- Round 1: Chev Walker, Patrick Ah Van, Olivier Elima, Matt Diskin, Bryn Hargreaves, Ian Sibbit, Gareth Raynor, Shad Royston and Kyle Briggs made their debuts for the Bulls.
- Round 1: Elliott Whitehead scored his 1st hat-trick for the Bulls.
- Round 1: Matt Diskin scored his 1st try for the Bulls.
- Round 1: Patrick Ah Van scored his 1st try for the Bulls.
- Round 1: Patrick Ah Van kicked his 1st goal for the Bulls.
- Round 3: Shaun Ainscough made his debut for the Bulls.
- Round 3: Shaun Ainscough and Shad Royston scored their 1st try for the Bulls.
- Round 4: Marc Herbert made his debut for the Bulls.
- Round 4: Craig Kopczak scored his 1st hat-trick for the Bulls.
- Round 5: Adam O'Brien made his debut for the Bulls.
- Round 5: Marc Herbert scored his 1st try for the Bulls.
- Round 5: Gareth Raynor scored his 1st try for the Bulls.
- Round 6: Olivier Elima scored his 1st try for the Bulls.
- Round 8: Tom Burgess made his debut for the Bulls.
- Round 9: Chev Walker scored his 1st try for the Bulls.
- Round 10: Marc Herbert kicked his 1st goal for the Bulls.
- Round 12: John Bateman made his debut for the Bulls.
- CCR4: Tom Burgess scored his 1st try for the Bulls.
- CCR4: Ian Sibbit scored his 1st try for the Bulls.
- CCR4: Patrick Ah Van reached 100 points for the Bulls.
- Round 14: Kyle Briggs scored his 1st try for the Bulls.
- Round 22: Patrick Ah Van reached 200 points for the Bulls.
- Round 22: Paul Sykes reached 300 points for the Bulls.
- Round 25: John Bateman scored his 1st try for the Bulls.

== Pre-season friendlies ==
Legend
Win
Draw
Loss

Bulls score is first.

Date	Competition	Vrs	H/A	Venue	Result	Score	Tries	Goals	Att
9 January 2011	Pre Season	Halifax RLFC	H	Odsal Stadium	W	50–8	Raynor, L'Estrange (2), Herbert, Bateman, Crookes, Royston, Whitehead, Platt	Herbert 1/2, Ah Van 6/7	4,607
23 January 2011	Pre Season	Dewsbury Rams	A	Rams Stadium	W	46–12	Diskin, Ah Van, McKay, Finigan (2), Reed, Crossley, Platt	Ah Van 7/8	1,599
28 January 2011	Pre Season	Keighley Cougars	A	Cougar Park	L	12–46	Bateman, Southernwood, Finigan	Southernwood 0/2, O'Brien 0/1	880
30 January 2011	Pre Season	Wakefield Trinity Wildcats	H	Grattan Stadium	W	40–16	L'Estrange, Kearney, Ah Van (2), Elima, Platt, Sykes	Herbert 1/1, Ah Van 4/5, Briggs 1/1	2,620

== Player appearances ==
- Friendly games only

FB=Fullback	C=Centre	W=Winger	SO=Stand Off	SH=Scrum half	P=Prop	H=Hooker	SR=Second row	LF=Loose forward	B=Bench

No	Player	1	2	3	4
1	Michael Platt	B	C	x	B
2	Dave Halley				
3	Paul Sykes	x	C	x	C
4	Chev Walker	C	x	x	C
5	Patrick Ah Van	C	FB	x	W
6	Brett Kearney			x	FB
7	Marc Herbert	SH	x	x	SH
8	Nick Scruton		P	x	B
9	Heath L'Estrange	H	x	x	H
10	Andy Lynch	P	x	x	P
11	Olivier Elima	x	SR	x	SR
12	Elliott Whitehead	SR	SR	x	SR
13	Jamie Langley	L	x	x	L
14	Matt Diskin		H	x	B
15	Bryn Hargreaves	B	x	x	P
16	Craig Kopczak	P	x	x	B
17	Ian Sibbitt	SR		x	B
18	Shaun Ainscough	W	x	x	W
19	Gareth Raynor	W	x	x	B
20	James Donaldson			x	x
21	Danny Addy	SO	L		
22	Steve Crossley	x	P	P	x
23	Tom Olbison	x	B	SR	x
24	Jason Crookes	B	W	C	x
25	Shad Royston	FB	x	x	B
26	Cain Southernwood	B	SH	SH	x
27	Adam O'Brien	B	B	H	x
28	Vinny Finigan	x	W	W	x
29	Tom Burgess	B	B	P	x
30	Liam McAvoy	x	SR	SR	x
31	John Bateman	B	B	L	x
32	Kyle Briggs	x	SO	x	SO

= Injured

= Suspended

== Table ==
Pos	Team	Pld	W	D	L	PF	PA	PD	Pts	Qualification
1	Warrington Wolves (L)	27	22	0	5	1072	401	+671	44	Play-offs
2	Wigan Warriors	27	20	3	4	852	432	+420	43	Play-offs
3	St Helens	27	17	3	7	782	515	+267	37	Play-offs
4	Huddersfield Giants	27	16	0	11	707	524	+183	32	Play-offs
5	Leeds Rhinos (C)	27	15	1	11	757	603	+154	31	Play-offs
6	Catalans Dragons	27	15	1	11	689	626	+63	31	Play-offs
7	Hull Kingston Rovers	27	14	0	13	713	692	+21	28	Play-offs
8	Hull F.C.	27	13	1	13	718	569	+149	27	Play-offs
9	Castleford Tigers	27	12	2	13	664	808	−144	26	
10	Bradford Bulls	27	9	2	16	570	826	−256	20	
11	Salford City Reds	27	10	0	17	542	809	−267	20	
12	Harlequins	27	6	1	20	524	951	−427	13	
13	Wakefield Trinity Wildcats	27	7	0	20	453	957	−504	10 (Note: Wakefield deducted 4 points for entering administration.)	
14	Crusaders	27	6	0	21	527	857	−330	8 (Note: Crusaders deducted 4 points for entering administration.)	

Source: rugbyleagueproject.org
Rules for classification: 1) Points; 2) Points difference; 3) Number of points scored;
(C) Champions; (L) League Leaders' Shield winners

== 2011 fixtures and results ==
Legend
Win
Draw
Loss

2011 Engage Super League

Date	Competition	Rnd	Vrs	H/A	Venue	Result	Score	Tries	Goals	Att	Live on TV	Report
13 February 2011	Magic Weekend	1	Leeds Rhinos	N	Millennium Stadium	L	28-32	Whitehead (3), Ah Van, Diskin	Ah Van 4/5	29,323	Sky Sports	Report
20 February 2011	Super League XVI	2	Wigan Warriors	H	Odsal Stadium	L	10-44	Ah Van, Whitehead	Ah Van 1/2	15,348	-	Report
26 February 2011	Super League XVI	3	Crusaders RL	A	Racecourse Ground	W	30-26	Ainscough, Diskin, L'Estrange, Lynch, Royston	Ah Van 5/5	2,615	Sky Sports	Report
6 March 2011	Super League XVI	4	Wakefield Trinity Wildcats	H	Odsal Stadium	W	40-18	Kopczak (3), Royston (2), Ainscough, Olbison	Ah Van 6/7	12,835	-	Report
13 March 2011	Super League XVI	5	Huddersfield Giants	A	Galpharm Stadium	L	16-50	Ainscough, Herbert, Raynor	Ah Van 2/3	9,466	-	Report
20 March 2011	Super League XVI	6	Castleford Tigers	H	Odsal Stadium	W	18-14	Scruton (2), Elima	Ah Van 3/3	14,348	-	Report
25 March 2011	Super League XVI	7	St. Helens	A	Halton Stadium	L	16-28	Ainscough (2), Ah Van	Ah Van 2/3	7,676	-	Report
3 April 2011	Super League XVI	8	Harlequins RL	H	Odsal Stadium	W	24-22	Diskin, Elima, Kearney, Sykes	Ah Van 4/5	12,354	-	Report
8 April 2011	Super League XVI	9	Hull F.C.	A	KC Stadium	L	24-34	Royston (2), Sykes, Walker	Ah Van 4/4	11,346	-	Report
16 April 2011	Super League XVI	10	Salford City Reds	A	The Willows	L	16-56	Herbert (2), Lynch	Herbert 2/3	2,809	Sky Sports	Report
21 April 2011	Super League XVI	11	Leeds Rhinos	H	Odsal Stadium	L	22-30	Elima (2), Ah Van, Lynch	Ah Van 3/5	19,275	Sky Sports	Report
25 April 2011	Super League XVI	12	Catalans Dragons	A	Stade Gilbert Brutus	D	8-8	L'Estrange	Ah Van 2/3	9,496	Sky Sports	Report
1 May 2011	Super League XVI	13	Warrington Wolves	H	Odsal Stadium	L	14-58	Kopczak, Lynch, Whitehead	Ah Van 1/3	14,134	-	Report
15 May 2011	Super League XVI	14	Hull Kingston Rovers	A	Craven Park	L	18-46	Briggs, Lynch, Raynor	Ah Van 3/3	7,923	-	Report
29 May 2011	Super League XVI	15	Salford City Reds	H	Odsal Stadium	W	28-14	Briggs (2), Jeffries, L'Estrange, Sykes	Ah Van 4/5	4,487	-	Report
4 June 2011	Super League XVI	16	Harlequins RL	A	Twickenham Stoop	W	30-16	Ah Van (2), Lynch, Royston, Whitehead	Ah Van 5/6	4,253	-	Report
12 June 2011	Super League XVI	17	St. Helens	H	Odsal Stadium	D	14-14	Kearney, Lynch	Ah Van 3/4	13,224	Sky Sports	Report
19 June 2011	Super League XVI	18	Hull F.C.	H	Odsal Stadium	L	14-28	Royston (2), Lynch	Ah Van 1/3	14,414	-	Report
24 June 2011	Super League XVI	19	Leeds Rhinos	A	Headingley Stadium	W	18-12	Elima (2)	Ah Van 5/7	18,095	-	Report
2 July 2011	Super League XVI	20	Catalans Dragons	H	Odsal Stadium	L	28-34	Burgess, Elima, Jeffries, Raynor	Ah Van 6/7	12,670	Sky Sports	Report
10 July 2011	Super League XVI	21	Castleford Tigers	A	The Jungle	L	30-34	Kearney (2), Raynor, Royston, Sykes	Ah Van 5/5	7,004	-	Report
17 July 2011	Super League XVI	22	Huddersfield Giants	H	Odsal Stadium	W	36-0	Sykes (2), Ah Van, Jeffries, Kearney, Platt	Ah Van 4/5, Sykes 2/3	14,047	-	Report
31 July 2011	Super League XVI	23	Warrington Wolves	A	Halliwell Jones Stadium	L	6-64	Ah Van	Ah Van 1/1	10,641	-	Report
14 August 2011	Super League XVI	24	Hull Kingston Rovers	H	Odsal Stadium	L	8-34	Herbert	Ah Van 2/2	13,441	Sky Sports	Report
19 August 2011	Super League XVI	25	Wigan Warriors	A	DW Stadium	L	12-60	Bateman, Kopczak	Ah Van 2/2	13,940	Sky Sports	Report
4 September 2011	Super League XVI	26	Crusaders RL	H	Odsal Stadium	W	48-24	Elima (2), Kearney (2), Ah Van, Ainscough, Kopczak, Lynch	Ah Van 8/8	12,998	-	Report
9 September 2011	Super League XVI	27	Wakefield Trinity Wildcats	A	Belle Vue	L	14-26	Ainscough, Briggs, Royston	Ah Van 1/3	6,486	-	Report

== Player appearances ==
- Super League Only

FB=Fullback	C=Centre	W=Winger	SO=Stand-off	SH=Scrum half	PR=Prop	H=Hooker	SR=Second row	L=Loose forward	B=Bench

No	Player	1	2	3	4	5	6	7	8	9	10	11	12	13	14	15	16	17	18	19	20	21	22	23	24	25	26	27
1	Michael Platt	C	C	C	C	C	C	C				C	C	C	C		W		B	B	C		C	C	C		C	x
2	Dave Halley																											
3	Paul Sykes	x	SO			FB	FB	FB	FB	SO	C		SO	SO		W						C	C	C		C	C	C
4	Chev Walker	C	C	SR					C	C	C	C	C	C													B	B
5	Patrick Ah Van	W	W	C	C	C	W	W	W	W		W	W	W	W	C	C	C	W	C	C	W	W	W	W	W	W	C
6	Brett Kearney	SH	SH	SO	SO	SO	SO	SO	SO	FB	FB	SO						FB	FB	FB	FB	FB	FB	FB	FB	FB	FB	
7	Marc Herbert				SH	SH	SH	SH	SH	SH	SH	SH	SH	SH			SH	SH	SH	SH	SH	SH	SH	SH	SH	SH	x	x
8	Nick Scruton	B	P	B	B	B	B	B											B	B	B	B	B	B	B			
9	Heath L'Estrange	H	H	H			B	B		B	H	H	B	B	H	B	B	B										
10	Andy Lynch	P	P	P	P	P	P	P	P	P	P	P	P	P	P	P	P	P	P	P	P	P	P	P	P	P	P	P
11	Olivier Elima	SR	SR	L	L	L	SR	SR	SR		SR	SR	SR	SR		SR	SR	SR	SR	L	SR	SR	SR	SR	SR	SR	SR	SR
12	Elliott Whitehead	SR	SR	SR	SR	SR	SR	SR	B	SR	SR	SR	B	B	C	C	C	C	C	C	SR	C	SR	SR	C	Red card	Red card	Red card
13	Jamie Langley	L					L	L							B	L	L	L	L	SR		SR			L	L	L	L
14	Matt Diskin	B	B	B	H	H	H	H	H	H	B	B	H	H	B	H	H	H	H	H	H	H	H	H				
15	Bryn Hargreaves	P	L	P	P	P	P	P	P	P	B	B	B	B	P	P				B	P	L	P	P	P	P	P	P
16	Craig Kopczak	B	B	B	B	B	B	B	B	B	P	P	P	P	B	B	P	P	P	P	L	B	L	L	B	B	B	x
17	Ian Sibbit	B	B		B	B	x	x	x	B	x	x	SR	SR	SR			SR	SR	SR					SR	SR	SR	
18	Shaun Ainscough	x	x	W	W	W	W	W	W	W	W			W													W	W
19	Gareth Raynor	W	W	W	W	W					W	W	W		W	Red card	Red card	W		W	W	W	W	W	W	W		W
20	James Donaldson								L	L	B	L			L	B	B	B			B		B	B				
21	Danny Addy	x	x	SH	B				B								B	x	B	B	B	B	B	B	H	H	H	H
22	Steve Crossley	x	x	x	x	x	x	x	x	x	x	x	B	x	x	x	x	x	x	x	x	x	x	x	x	x	x	B
23	Tom Olbison	x	B	B	SR	SR	B	B	SR	SR	L	B	x	L	SR	SR	SR	B										
24	Jason Crookes	x	x	x	x	x	x	x	x	x	x	x	x	x	x	W	W	W	W	W	W	x	x	x	x	x	x	x
25	Shad Royston	FB	FB	FB	FB		C	C	C	C		FB	FB	FB	FB	FB	FB		C			B				C	x	FB
26	Cain Southernwood	x	x	x	x	x	x	x	x	x	x	x	x	x	x	x	x	x	x	x	x	x	x	x	x	x	x	x
27	Adam O'Brien	x	x	x	x	B	x	x	x	x	x	x	x	x	x	x	x	x	x	x	x	x	x	x	B	B	B	B
28	Vinny Finigan	x	x	x	x	x	x	x	x	x	x	x	x	x	x	x	x	x	x	x	x	x	x	x	x	x	x	x
29	Tom Burgess	x	x	x	x	x	x	x	B	B	B	B	x	B	B	B	B	B	B	x	B	P	B	B	B	B	B	B
30	Liam McAvoy	x	x	x	x	x	x	x	x	x	x	x	x	x	x	x	x	x	x	x	x	x	x	x	x	x	x	x
31	John Bateman	x	x	x	x	x	x	x	x	x	x	x	L	x	x	x	x	x	x	x	x	x	x	x	x	B	x	SR
32	Kyle Briggs	SO					x	x	x	x	SO				SH	SH				x	x	x	x	x	x	x	SH	SH
33	Ben Jeffries	x	x	x	x	x	x	x	x	x	x	x	x	x	SO	SO	SO	SO	SO	SO	SO	SO	SO	SO	SO	SO	SO	SO

= Injured

= Suspended

== Challenge Cup ==
Legend
Win
Draw
Loss

Date	Competition	Rnd	Vrs	H/A	Venue	Result	Score	Tries	Goals	Att	TV	Report
8 May 2011	Cup	4th	Halifax RLFC	A	The Shay	W	46-34	Raynor (2), Ah Van, Burgess, Platt, Royston, Sibbit, Whitehead	Ah Van 7/9	5,045	BBC Sport	Report
22 May 2011	Cup	5th	Wigan Warriors	H	Odsal Stadium	L	22-26	Ah Van (2), Royston, Whitehead	Ah Van 3/4	5,828	BBC Sport	Report

== Player appearances ==
- Challenge Cup Games only

FB=Fullback	C=Centre	W=Winger	SO=Stand Off	SH=Scrum half	PR=Prop	H=Hooker	SR=Second row	L=Loose forward	B=Bench

No	Player	4	5
1	Michael Platt	C	C
2	Dave Halley		
3	Paul Sykes	x	
4	Chev Walker	C	x
5	Patrick Ah Van	W	W
6	Brett Kearney		
7	Marc Herbert	SH	
8	Nick Scruton		
9	Heath L'Estrange	H	H
10	Andy Lynch	P	P
11	Olivier Elima		SR
12	Elliott Whitehead	SR	C
13	Jamie Langley		L
14	Matt Diskin	x	B
15	Bryn Hargreaves	B	P
16	Craig Kopczak	P	B
17	Ian Sibbit	SR	SR
18	Shaun Ainscough		
19	Gareth Raynor	W	W
20	James Donaldson	L	
21	Danny Addy		
22	Steve Crossley	x	x
23	Tom Olbison	x	B
24	Jason Crookes	x	x
25	Shad Royston	FB	FB
26	Cain Southernwood	x	x
27	Adam O'Brien	B	x
28	Vinny Finigan	x	x
29	Tom Burgess	B	B
30	Liam McAvoy	x	x
31	John Bateman	B	x
32	Kyle Briggs	SO	SH
33	Ben Jeffries	x	SO

== 2011 squad statistics ==
- Appearances and Points include (Super League, Challenge Cup and Play-offs) as of 9 September 2011.

No	Player	Position	Age	Previous club	Apps	Tries	Goals	DG	Points
1	Michael Platt	Fullback	N/A	Castleford Tigers	21	2	0	0	8
2	Dave Halley	Wing	N/A	Bradford Bulls Academy	0	0	0	0	0
3	Paul Sykes	Centre	N/A	Harlequins RL	16	6	2	0	28
4	Chev Walker	Centre	N/A	Hull Kingston Rovers	12	1	0	0	4
5	Patrick Ah Van	Wing	N/A	New Zealand Warriors	28	12	97	0	242
6	Brett Kearney	Stand off	N/A	Cronulla Sharks	21	7	0	0	28
7	Marc Herbert	Scrum half	N/A	Canberra Raiders	21	4	2	0	20
8	Nick Scruton	Prop	N/A	Leeds Rhinos	14	2	0	0	8
9	Heath L'Estrange	Hooker	N/A	Manly Sea Eagles	16	3	0	0	12
10	Andy Lynch	Prop	N/A	Castleford Tigers	29	9	0	0	36
11	Olivier Elima	Second row	N/A	Catalans Dragons	26	9	0	0	36
12	Elliott Whitehead	Second row	N/A	Bradford Bulls Academy	26	8	0	0	32
13	Jamie Langley	Loose forward	N/A	Bradford Bulls Academy	15	0	0	0	0
14	Matt Diskin	Hooker	N/A	Leeds Rhinos	23	3	0	0	12
15	Bryn Hargreaves	Prop	N/A	St Helens R.F.C.	25	0	0	0	0
16	Craig Kopczak	Prop	N/A	Bradford Bulls Academy	28	6	0	0	24
17	Ian Sibbit	Second row	N/A	Salford City Reds	16	1	0	0	4
18	Shaun Ainscough	Wing	N/A	Wigan Warriors	11	7	0	0	28
19	Gareth Raynor	Wing	N/A	Crusaders RL	20	6	0	0	24
20	James Donaldson	Loose forward	N/A	Bradford Bulls Academy	12	0	0	0	0
21	Danny Addy	Loose forward	N/A	Bradford Bulls Academy	14	0	0	0	0
22	Steve Crossley	Prop	N/A	Bradford Bulls Academy	2	0	0	0	0
23	Tom Olbison	Second row	N/A	Bradford Bulls Academy	16	1	0	0	4
24	Jason Crookes	Centre	N/A	Bradford Bulls Academy	6	0	0	0	0
25	Shad Royston	Fullback	N/A	Halifax	20	12	0	0	48
26	Cain Southernwood	Scrum half	N/A	Wakefield Trinity Wildcats	0	0	0	0	0
27	Adam O'Brien	Hooker	N/A	Bradford Bulls Academy	6	0	0	0	0
28	Vinny Finigan	Wing	N/A	Bradford Bulls Academy	0	0	0	0	0
29	Tom Burgess	Prop	N/A	Bradford Bulls Academy	20	2	0	0	8
30	Liam McAvoy	Prop	N/A	Bradford Bulls Academy	0	0	0	0	0
31	John Bateman	Second row	N/A	Bradford Bulls Academy	4	1	0	0	4
32	Kyle Briggs	Stand off	N/A	Featherstone Rovers	8	4	0	0	16
33	Ben Jeffries	Stand off	N/A	Wakefield Trinity Wildcats	15	3	0	0	12

= Injured = Suspended

== 2011 transfers in/out ==
In

	Name	Position	Signed from	Date
(England)	Shaun Ainscough	Wing	Wigan Warriors	August 2010
(England)	Chev Walker	Centre	Hull Kingston Rovers	August 2010
(New Zealand)	Patrick Ah Van	Wing	New Zealand Warriors	September 2010
(England)	Bryn Hargreaves	Prop	St Helens R.F.C.	September 2010
(France)	Olivier Elima	Second row	Catalans Dragons	September 2010
(England)	Ian Sibbit	Second row	Salford City Reds	September 2010
(England)	Gareth Raynor	Wing	Crusaders RL	September 2010
(Australia)	Shad Royston	Fullback	Halifax	September 2010
(England)	Matt Diskin	Hooker	Leeds Rhinos	October 2010
(Australia)	Marc Herbert	Scrum half	Canberra Raiders	October 2010
(England)	Kyle Briggs	Stand off	Featherstone Rovers	January 2011
(Australia)	Ben Jeffries	Stand off	Wakefield Trinity Wildcats	May 2011

Out

	Name	Position	Club Signed	Date
(Australia)	Chris Nero	Centre	Salford City Reds	August 2010
(Australia)	Steve Menzies	Second row	Catalans Dragons	September 2010
(England)	Joe Wardle	Centre	Huddersfield Giants	September 2010
(England)	Rikki Sheriffe	Wing	Newcastle Falcons (RU)	September 2010
(England)	Stuart Reardon	Wing	Crusaders	September 2010
(England)	Andy Tate	Second row	Wakefield Trinity Wildcats	October 2010
(England)	Danny Sculthorpe	Prop	Widnes Vikings	November 2010
(England)	Michael Worrincy	Second row	Penrith Panthers	November 2010
(England)	George Burgess	Prop	South Sydney Rabbitohs	December 2010
(England)	Wayne Godwin	Hooker	Salford City Reds	December 2010
(Australia)	Glenn Hall	Second row	North Queensland Cowboys	January 2011
(Australia)	Matt Orford	Scrum half	Canberra Raiders	January 2011
(England)	Dave Halley	Fullback	Keighley Cougars	June 2011
