= Olivier Elima =

France international rugby league player and coach

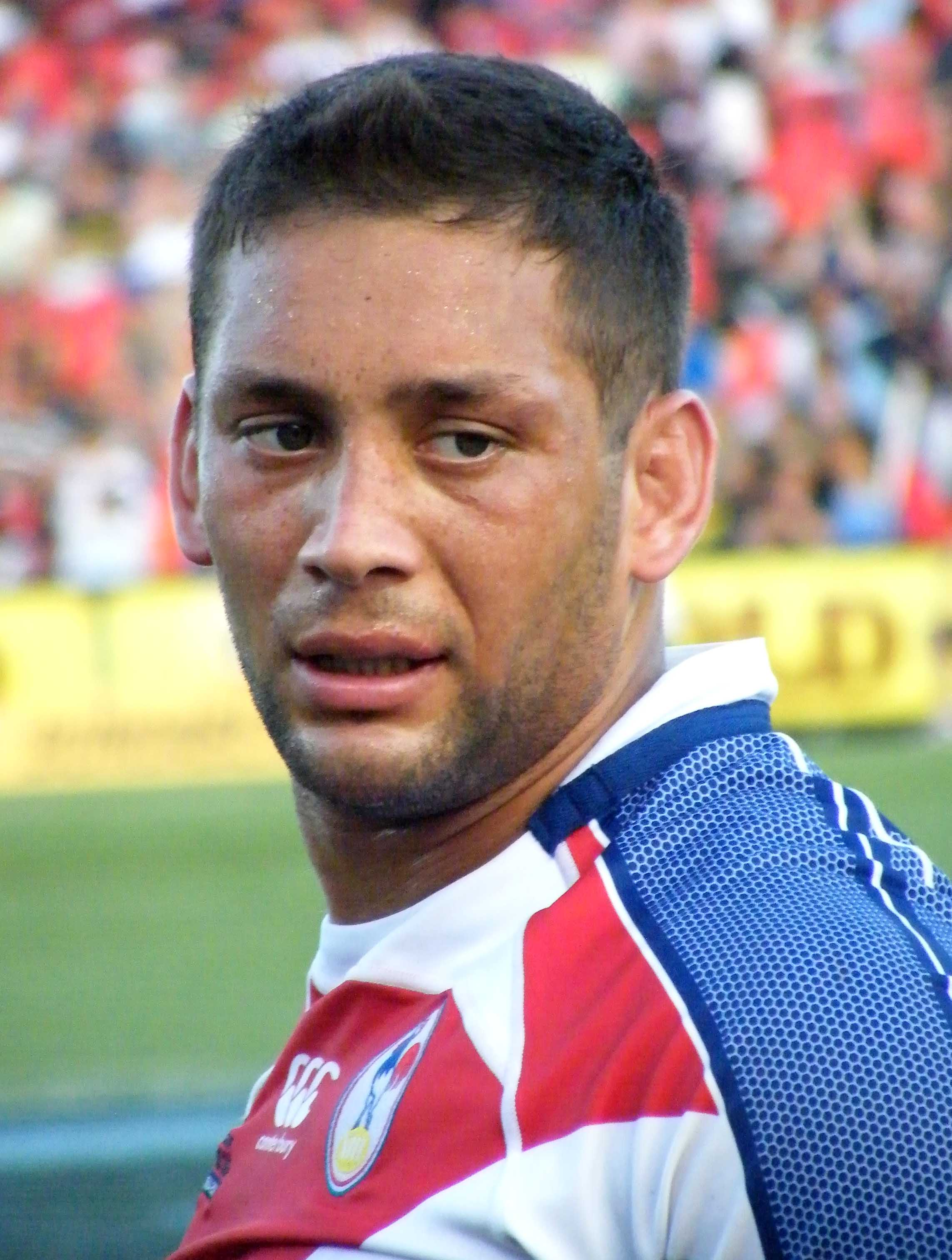

Personal information
- Born: 19 May 1983 (age 43) Nantes, Loire-Atlantique, Pays de la Loire, France

Playing information
- Height: 188 cm (6 ft 2 in)
- Weight: 101 kg (15 st 13 lb)
- Position: Second-row, Prop, Loose forward
Club
Years	Team	Pld	T	G	FG	P
2002	Castleford Tigers	1	1	0	0	4
2003–07	Wakefield Trinity Wildcats	87	13	0	0	52
2008–10	Catalans Dragons	73	34	0	0	136
2011–12	Bradford Bulls	44	13	0	0	52
2013–16	Catalans Dragons	61	4	0	0	16
2016–16	Palau XIII Broncos	14	1	0	0	0
	Total	280	66	0	0	260
Representative
Years	Team	Pld	T	G	FG	P
2004–13	France	30	10	0	0	32

Coaching information
Club
Years	Team	Gms	W	D	L	W%
2017–20	Palau XIII Broncos

Olivier Elima (born 19 May 1983) is a French former professional rugby league footballer who was most recently head coach for the Palau Broncos in the French Elite One Championship. A France international representative forward, he played previously for the Catalans Dragons, Castleford Tigers, Wakefield Trinity Wildcats and the Bradford Bulls.

== Background ==
Elima was born in Nantes, France.

== Playing career ==
Elima has previously played in the centre during the earlier part of his career. The French forward had an excellent season with the Wakefield Trinity Wildcats in 2006. Elima plays in the second-row, he has also featured at prop, and loose forward.

Elima was named in the France training squad for the 2008 Rugby League World Cup.

Elima had been named in the France squad for the 2008 Rugby League World Cup.

Elima captained France in the 2009 Four Nations tournament, scoring his team's only try in their match against Australia.

Elima captained France in the 2013 Rugby League World Cup Tournament.

=== Bradford Bulls ===
Elima confirmed his switch to the Bradford Bulls and signed a two-year contract with the club in September 2010. Statistics do NOT include pre-season friendlies.

2011 – 2011 Season

Elima appeared in two of the three pre-season games. He played against Dewsbury and Wakefield Trinity Wildcats.

Elima featured in eight consecutive games from Round 1 Leeds until Round 8 Harlequins RL. He then appeared in Round 10 against the Salford City Reds to Round 13 Warrington. Elima then featured in thirteen consecutive games from Round 15 against Salford to Round 27 against the Wakefield Trinity Wildcats. He also appeared in the Challenge Cup game against Wigan.

2012 – 2012 Season

Elima missed all the pre-season games due to a knee injury. Elima missed Rounds 1–6 due to an injury. He returned in round 7 to face St. Helens. He was suspended for Round 8. He featured in eleven consecutive games from Round 9 Hull F.C. to Round 19 against Wigan. Elima also featured in Round 21 against Leeds. He was injured for Rounds 22–25. Elima featured in Round 26 Hull F.C. and Round 27 against the Catalans Dragons. He also featured in the Challenge Cup against Doncaster and Warrington. It was later announced that Elima had signed a two-year deal with former club the Catalans Dragons.

== Coaching career ==
=== Palau XIII Broncos ===
He was appointed coach of Palau Broncos in 2017. On 23 December 2020 it was reported that he had been sacked by Palau XIII Broncos after their poor start to the Elite One Championship season
