= Ian Sibbit =

English rugby league footballer

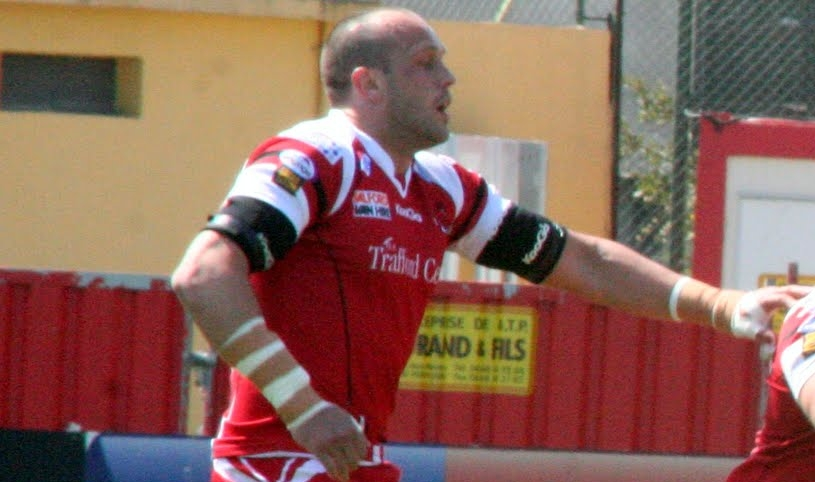

Personal information
- Full name: Ian Sibbit
- Born: 15 October 1980 (age 45) Wigan, Greater Manchester, England

Playing information
- Height: 6 ft 3 in (190 cm)
- Weight: 16 st 7 lb (105 kg)
- Position: Second-row, Centre
Club
Years	Team	Pld	T	G	FG	P
1999–01	Warrington Wolves	39	16	0	0	64
2002	Melbourne Storm	20	3	0	0	12
2003–04	Warrington Wolves	41	8	0	0	32
2005–10	Salford City Reds	118	22	0	0	88
2011–12	Bradford Bulls	20	1	0	0	4
	Total	238	50	0	0	200
Representative
Years	Team	Pld	T	G	FG	P
2003	England A	3	0	0	0	0

Ian Sibbit (born 15 October 1980), also known by the nickname of "Sibs", is an English former professional rugby league footballer who played as a second row.

Sibbit signed for Salford in 2004 from the Warrington Wolves having also played for Melbourne Storm. He also went on to play for Bradford Bulls.

== Bradford Bulls ==
He signed a two-year deal with the Bradford Bulls for 2011's Super League XVI. He is not seen as a direct replacement for Steve Menzies but is seen as a back-up player. Statistics do NOT include pre-season friendlies.

2011 – 2011 Season

Sibbit appeared in two of the four pre-season games. He played against Halifax and Wakefield Trinity Wildcats.

Ian featured in Round 1 and 2 against Leeds Rhinos and Wigan Warriors. His next game would be in Round 4 (Wakefield Trinity Wildcats) the in Round 5 (Huddersfield Giants). Sibbit then appeared in Round 9 (Hull F.C.). Ian featured in three consecutive games from Round 12 (Catalans Dragons) to Round 14 (Hull Kingston Rovers). He appeared in another three consecutive game between Round 17 (St. Helens) and Round 19 (Leeds Rhinos). Sibbit then featured in Round 24 (Hull Kingston Rovers) until Round 26 (Crusaders). He also featured in the Challenge Cup games against Halifax and Wigan Warriors. He scored a try against Halifax.

2012 – 2012 Season

Sibbit featured in three of the four pre-season friendlies. He played against Castleford Tigers, Dewsbury Rams and Hull FC.

Ian featured in two consecutive games from Round 1 (Catalans Dragons) to Round 2 (Castleford Tigers). He missed Rounds 3-15 and Round 4–5 in the Challenge Cup due to an injury. He featured in two consecutive games from Round 16 (Castleford Tigers) to Round 17 (St. Helens). He was injured for Rounds 18–27. Sibbit announced his retirement from the game on 5 September 2012.

Season	Appearance	Tries	Goals	F/G	Points
2011	16	1	0	0	4
2012	4	0	0	0	0
Total	20	1	0	0	4
