= Tom Olbison =

English professional rugby league footballer

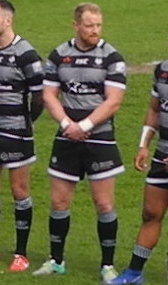

Personal information
- Full name: Thomas Olbison
- Born: 20 March 1991 (age 35) Leeds, West Yorkshire, England
- Height: 6 ft 2 in (1.88 m)
- Weight: 15 st 10 lb (100 kg)

Playing information
- Position: Second-row
Club
Years	Team	Pld	T	G	FG	P
2009–16	Bradford Bulls	145	19	0	0	76
2013(loan)	→ Dewsbury Rams	2	0	0	0	0
2017–18	Widnes Vikings	54	5	0	0	20
2019–20	Toronto Wolfpack	36	4	0	0	16
	Total	237	28	0	0	112
- Source: As of 31 March 2021

Tom Olbison (born 20 March 1991) is an English professional rugby league footballer who last played as a second-row forward for the Toronto Wolfpack in the Super League

He has previously played for the Bradford Bulls and the Widnes Vikings in the Super League. He spent time on loan from Bradford at the Dewsbury Rams in the Championship.

== Background ==
Tom Olbison was born in Leeds, West Yorkshire, England.

== Playing career ==
=== Bradford Bulls ===
Olbison joined Bradford Bulls from East Leeds A.R.L.F.C. and made his Super League début for the Bulls against Warrington Wolves in April 2009.

In August 2010, Olbison scored his first try for Bradford against Catalans Dragons.

In April 2011, he signed a four-year deal to stay at Bradford until the end of the 2014 season. In July 2014, he signed a further two-year contract at Bradford who were relegated to the Championship at the end of the 2014 season.

=== Widnes Vikings ===
Following Bradford's liquidation, Olbison became a free agent and signed a one-year deal with Super League side Widnes in January 2017.

== Statistics ==
Season	Appearance	Tries	Goals	F/G	Points
2009 Bradford Bulls	1	0	0	0	0
2010 Bradford Bulls	7	1	0	0	4
2011 Bradford Bulls	16	1	0	0	4
2012 Bradford Bulls	14	0	0	0	0
2013 Bradford Bulls	21	2	0	0	8
2014 Bradford Bulls	27	7	0	0	28
2015 Bradford Bulls	30	2	0	0	8
2016 Bradford Bulls	29	6	0	0	24
Total	145	19	0	0	76
