= Shaun Ainscough =

English rugby league footballer

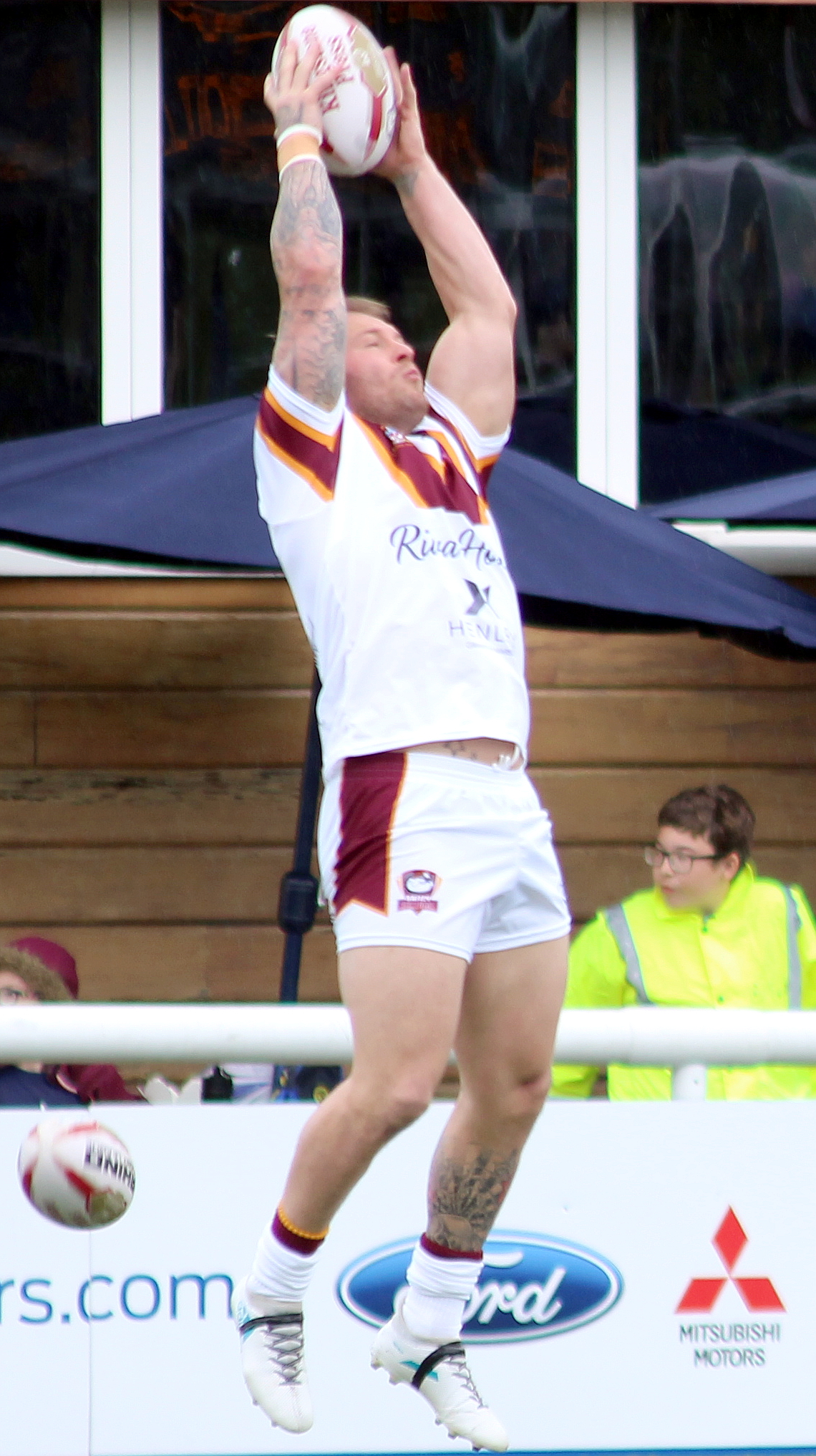

Personal information
- Full name: Shaun Michael Ainscough
- Born: 27 November 1989 (age 36) Billinge Higher End, Wigan, England
- Height: 5 ft 10 in (1.78 m)
- Weight: 13 st 8 lb (86 kg)

Playing information
- Position: Wing
Club
Years	Team	Pld	T	G	FG	P
2009–10	Wigan Warriors	13	17	0	0	68
2010(loan)	→ Widnes Vikings	10	8	0	0	32
2010(loan)	→ Castleford Tigers	7	4	0	0	16
2011–12	Bradford Bulls	29	18	0	0	72
2014	Whitehaven	21	13	0	0	52
2015–18	Batley Bulldogs	86	36	0	0	144
2019–21	Rochdale Hornets	28	10	0	0	40
	Total	194	106	0	0	424
- Source: As of 22 September 2022

Shaun Ainscough (born 27 November 1989) is a former English professional rugby league footballer who last played as a winger for the Rochdale Hornets in the Championship.

Ainscough started his professional career for the Wigan Warriors in the Super League, and has also played for the Bradford Bulls. He now works at CM Health and Fitness personal training when not playing rugby league.

He caused a sensation by scoring sixteen tries in his first ten professional games, becoming the league's leading try scorer at one point.

== Background ==
Ainscough was born in Billinge Higher End, Wigan, England.

== Early life ==
Ainscough's first experience of competitive rugby league football came through Wigan St Judes ARLFC.

He remained at the amateur club until 2006, when he gained a scholarship to join the academy of his hometown professional club, Wigan. His first game for the academy came in a Junior Academy Championship fixture at Hilton Park against Leigh, as a wing]. Ainscough marked this appearance by also scoring his first try in a Wigan jersey. He was rotated into different positions throughout his academy career, playing at centre for a repeat match against Leigh seven weeks later, as well as fullback against Harlequins RL the game after that. On both occasions, Ainscough scored tries, earning one and two tries in each game respectively. However, his first competitive hat-trick came playing on the left wing in a play-off game against Widnes. During his time with the academy in 2007, Ainscough also played two matches at senior level, once against Hull FC, and once against Harlequins RL, scoring a try in the latter fixture.

His energetic style on the wing was noted by the club's coaches, and this continued to impress officials inside the club and out, leading to him earning a place for the England under-17s team during the Australian Institute of Sport's tour of the United Kingdom and France in 2007. The second test of this series ended with a victory for the England team winning 38–22, thanks in no small part to a hat-trick of tries from Ainscough, and another from Richard Myler, who would also go on to prominence in the Super League with fellow Lancastrians, Salford.

Although he was not yet officially a part of Wigan first team, his debut appearance for the club was in a friendly match against Bradford Bulls in January 2008, wearing jersey number 31. It was a successful start for the then-eighteen-year-old, scoring two of Wigan's five tries, each of them either side of the half-time break in a match Wigan won 16–28. The twenty-man teamsheets for two other pre-season friendlies against Warrington, and Widnes in 2008 also included Ainscough as a substitute, but he was never utilised in either game.

The start of 2008 saw Ainscough being promoted from the academy sides to the reserve side, just one level below the first team. By coincidence, his first appearance and first try for the reserves was away against Leigh, as they had also been for his academy career, although this time, he played at fullback, not wing. The rest of the year saw five official appearances for Ainscough, scoring five tries including another hat-trick, this time against Wakefield Trinity. He also made four appearances in the Gillette Academy championship, scoring five tries.

His efforts in the reserves earned him a place in a pre-season friendly during the Christmas season of 2008 against Warrington, in which Ainscough picked up a try following a pass from Cameron Phelps. It was his last match before being selected for the first team in 2009. In the whole of his career prior to starting first-class rugby league for Wigan, he appeared in 32 academy and reserve fixtures, of which 24 were won, with Ainscough personally scoring 28 tries.

=== Wigan Warriors ===
==== Debut season ====
Ainscough was promoted into Wigan first team on 22 January after receiving the number 28 jersey, which previously belonged to fellow academy product Sam Tomkins the season before. His first Super League game was in a 22–28 home defeat by Castleford, a match in which he scored his first Super League try which looked to have given Wigan a chance of winning the match until Castleford scored another try through Michael Shenton.

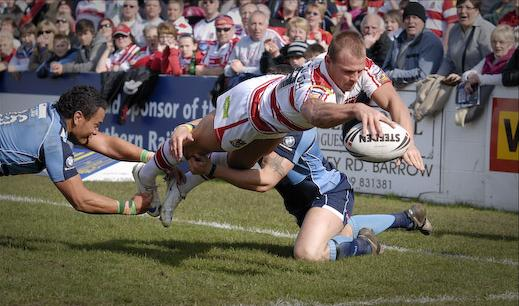
Ainscough dives for the line to score a try in the 2009 Challenge Cup for Wigan during their victory over Barrow

However, Ainscough made a lasting contribution in his next appearance against Harlequins RL at the Twickenham Stoop, in which he and Amos Roberts scored late in the match to give Wigan their first home win of the 2009 Super League season. Ainscough then featured in the Wigan team that defeated Bradford Bulls by 34 points at the JJB Stadium, before scoring a try on the way to a defeat at Leeds the week after.

An away victory over Salford City Reds in which he personally contributed two tries was to be the last win in the Super League for some weeks for Ainscough. Although a home defeat by Huddersfield Giants was followed by a hat-trick performance at Barrow Raiders in the 2009 Challenge Cup (a game in which Wigan were pushed hard by Barrow), two further defeats at home to St. Helens, and away to the Catalans Dragons in Perpignan forced Wigan coach Brian Noble into changing the squad around, and even though Ainscough had contributed the only two tries of the night for Wigan against St Helens, he found himself out of the new squad, with Noble favouring Pat Richards, and Amos Roberts on the wings with George Carmont, and new Warrington-signing Martin Gleeson at centre, and Cameron Phelps at fullback for Wigan's next game against Crusaders.

The brief hiatus broke the very next game, however, as Ainscough (who had been omitted from the initial nineteen-man teamsheet) was called up late to replace a tonsillitis-stricken George Carmont. He personally ran-in four tries to secure a 26–40 victory against Wakefield Trinity at Belle Vue, to the praise of commentators in the British mainstream national newspapers, and drawing comparisons to the Wigan legend, Martin Offiah. The match brought his Super League tally of tries for the season to thirteen, the most of anyone in the league by that point. Despite this, Ainscough has only appeared in two more matches to date – an away defeat by Warrington Wolves, and another away defeat by Celtic Crusaders.

His capabilities in defence drew criticism from some coaches, not least his own coach at Wigan. Following the game at Wakefield Trinity, Noble stated that, "there are other parts of his game he needs to improve". In a pre-match interview before the Magic Weekend in Round 12, St Helens coach Mick Potter stated he was a target for high kicks, with the belief that Ainscough's opposite winger Ade Gardner, the leading try scorer in 2008's Super League XIII, would put him under pressure. It was a game Ainscough did not eventually play in.

After losing his place, Ainscough continued to play in the reserves, although in August it was confirmed he had suffered scaphoid wrist damage, and as a result would possibly be out for the rest of the 2009 season.

==== 2010 season ====
Ainscough recovered from injury, and in December 2009, he was confirmed as a player in Wigan's first team for the 2010 season. Before the 2010 season started, Wigan signed a dual registration agreement with Co-operative Championship side Widnes for Ainscough and his team-mate, Liam Farrell. The agreement allowed Ainscough to play for Widnes whenever a place in Wigan's seventeen-man squad was unavailable, with the exception of Challenge Cup matches. Ainscough was recalled from Widnes and has since joined Castleford Tigers on an initial one-month loan. Shaun has now agreed to stay at Castleford for the whole of the 2010 season.

=== Bradford Bulls ===
Ainscough signed a one-year contract at the end of the 2010 season to play for Bradford Bulls in 2011. He appeared in two of the four pre-season games, firstly against Halifax, and then Wakefield Trinity. In the regular season, he featured in eight consecutive games from round 3 Crusaders to round 10 Salford. His next appearance was in round 13 Warrington. He recovered from surgery to play in Round 26 Crusaders and round 27 Wakefield Trinity.

Ainscough appeared in three of the four pre-season friendlies, he played against Castleford Tigers, Dewsbury and Keighley. He scored a try against Castleford and another against Dewsbury.

Ainscough featured in five consecutive games from round 10 Leeds to round 14 Salford. He featured in eleven consecutive games from round 16 Castleford to round 26 Hull F.C.. He also featured in the Challenge Cup against Doncaster and Warrington.

After the 2012 season he chose not to accept a new contract with Bradford which offered him less money than the previous two years. This lead him to make the decision to move to the South City Bulls in New South Wales, Australia.

Season	Appearance	Tries	Goals	F/G	Points
2011 Bradford	11	7	0	0	28
2012 Bradford	18	11	0	0	44
Total	29	18	0	0	72

=== Batley ===
Between 2015 and 2018, Ainscough played for Batley making over 80 appearances. On 2 September 2015, Ainscough famously kicked the ball across the field in an attempt to find the touchline in Batley's game against Featherstone. Batley were winning the match 26–22 after the final siren when Ainscough attempted the kick. The ball did not reach the touchline and it was picked up by a Featherstone player who scored a try to make it 26-26. Paul Sykes would then kick a goal from the side line to win the match for Featherstone 28–26.

=== South City Bulls ===
After Ainscough finished at Bradford Bulls he moved to Australia to play part-time for the South City Bulls whilst also taking on a regular job.

=== Rochdale Hornets ===
After joining for the 2019 season, it was announced in July 2020 that Ainscough had committed to stay at Rochdale
