= Kyle Briggs =

English rugby league footballer

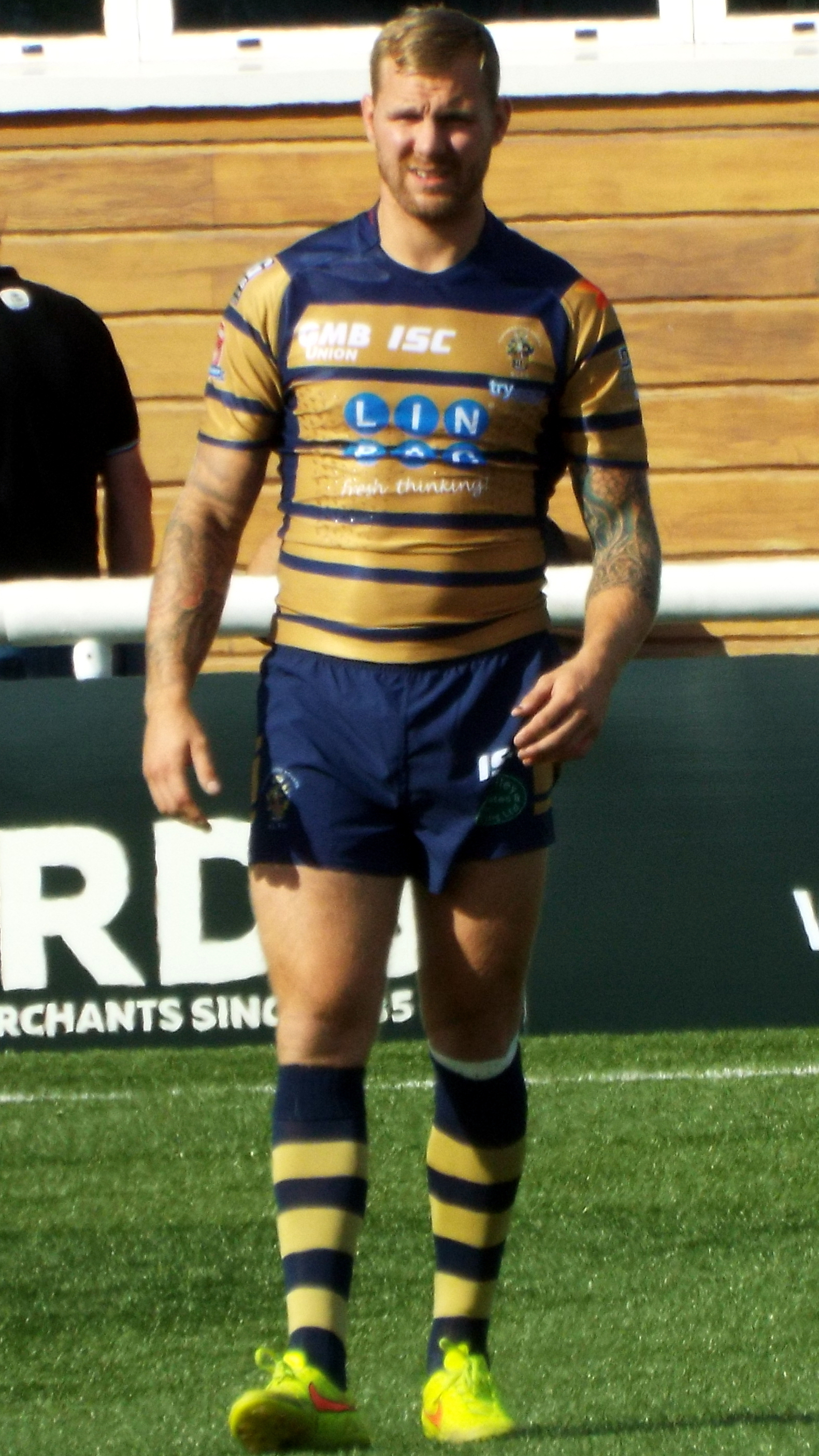

Personal information
- Full name: Kyle Briggs
- Born: 7 December 1987 (age 38) Leeds, West Yorkshire, England
- Height: 6 ft 0 in (183 cm)
- Weight: 13 st 5 lb (85 kg)

Playing information
- Position: Stand-off, Scrum-half
Club
Years	Team	Pld	T	G	FG	P
2008–09	Doncaster	35	15	99	2	260
2009–10	Featherstone Rovers	44	34	124	0	380
2011–12	Bradford Bulls	18	24	16	0	128
2011(loan)	→ Harlequins RL	3	0	0	0	0
2012(loan)	→ Featherstone Rovers	18	7	0	0	28
2013–14	Featherstone Rovers	20	7	12	0	52
2014(loan)	→ Dewsbury Rams	4	2	0	0	8
2014–15	Sheffield Eagles	34	12	47	0	142
2016–17	Featherstone Rovers	41	12	63	2	176
	Total	217	113	361	4	1174
- Source: As of 13 January 2018

Kyle Briggs (born 7 December 1987) is an English professional rugby league footballer who has played in the 2000s and 2010s. He has played at club level for Doncaster, Featherstone Rovers (four spells, including the second on loan), the Bradford Bulls, Harlequins RL (loan), the Dewsbury Rams (loan) and the Sheffield Eagles, as a stand-off or scrum-half.

== Bradford Bulls ==
2011 - 2011 Season

Kyle featured in two of the four pre-season games, he played against the Dewsbury Rams and he kicked a goal against the Wakefield Trinity Wildcats.

He featured in 7 games this season. His first was Round 1 (Leeds Rhinos). He picked up an injury and missed the next four. He was not selected again until Round 10 (Salford City Reds), he was dropped again but selected to play against Hull Kingston Rovers (Rnd 14) and the Salford City Reds (Rnd 15). He was then sent out on loan to Harlequins RL but after he broke his wrist he returned to the Bradford Bulls, after recovering from the broken wrist he appeared against the Crusaders (Rnd 26) and Wakefield Trinity Wildcats (Rnd 27). Kyle scored tries against Hull Kingston Rovers (1 try), the Salford City Reds (2 tries) and the Wakefield Trinity Wildcats (1 try).

2012 - 2012 Season

Briggs featured in three of the four pre-season friendlies. He played against the Castleford Tigers, the Dewsbury Rams and the Keighley Cougars. Kyle kicked a goal against the Castleford Tigers, scored a try and kicked 2 goals against the Keighley Cougars.

Kyle was loaned back to Featherstone Rovers for the season.

== Sheffield Eagles ==
Midway through the 2014 Season, Briggs signed for Sheffield Eagles.
