= Patrick Ah Van =

Samoa international rugby league footballer

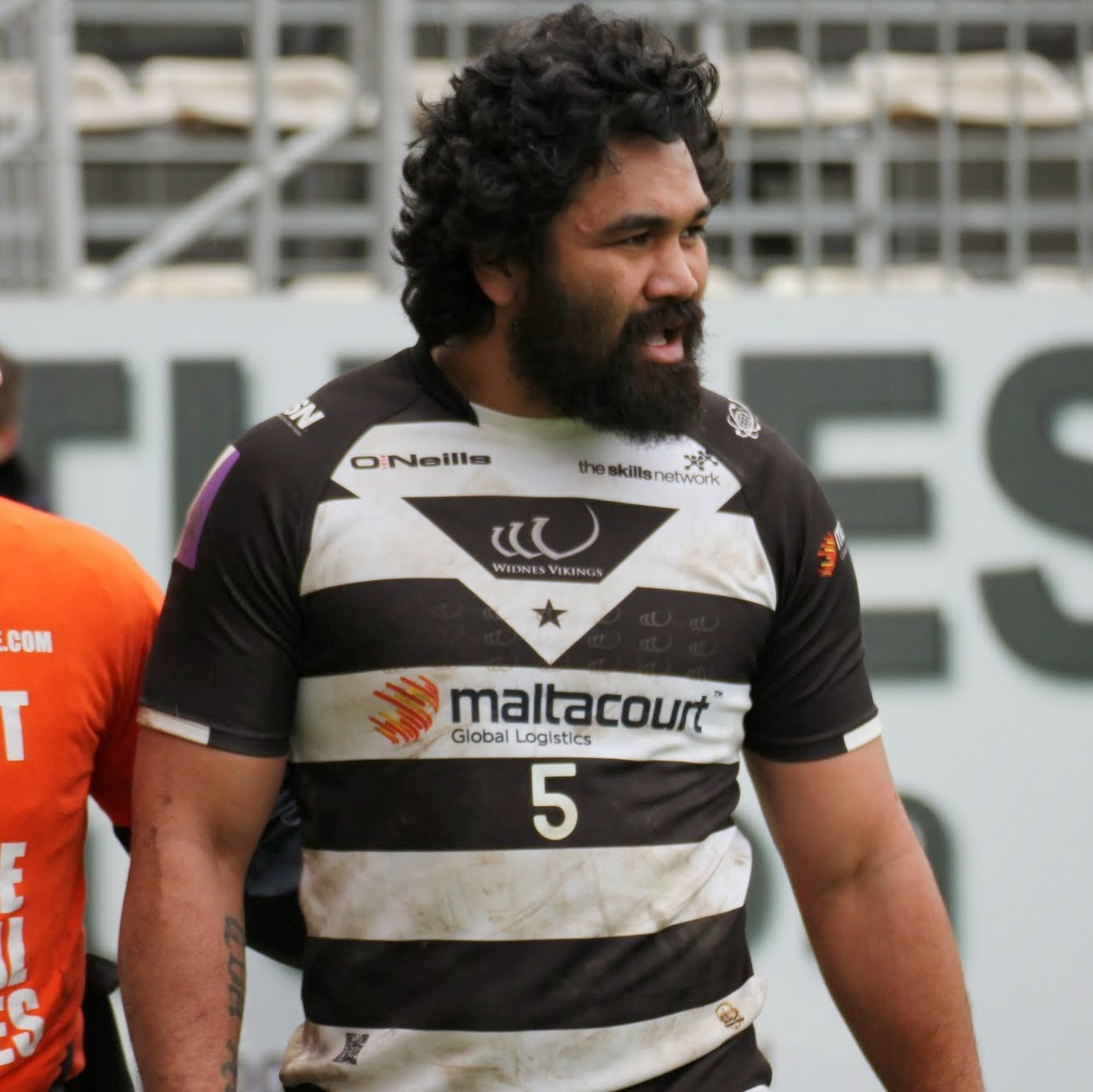

Personal information
- Born: 17 March 1988 (age 38) Auckland, New Zealand
- Height: 6 ft 0 in (1.83 m)
- Weight: 15 st 8 lb (99 kg)

Playing information

Rugby league
- Position: Wing, Centre
Club
Years	Team	Pld	T	G	FG	P
2006–10	New Zealand Warriors	54	16	5	0	74
2011	Bradford Bulls	28	12	97	0	242
2012–18	Widnes Vikings	123	95	73	0	526
2018(loan)	→ North Wales Crusaders	1	0	3	0	6
2018–19	Villegailhenc-Aragon	0	0	0	0	0
2019	Widnes Vikings	5	4	0	0	16
2020	Villegailhenc-Aragon	0	0	0	0	0
2021–22	North Wales Crusaders	42	21	6	0	84
2023	Oldham RLFC	19	15	6	0	72
2024–26	North Wales Crusaders	38	24	2	0	48
2026	Swinton Lions	11	3	0	0	12
	Total	321	190	192	0	1080
Representative
Years	Team	Pld	T	G	FG	P
2009	Samoa	5	4	0	0	16

Rugby union
Club
Years	Team	Pld	T	G	FG	P
2019–20	Sale FC Rugby Club	4	0	0	0	0
2023–24	Anselmians RUFC	10	5	0	0	25
2026–	New Brighton FC	0	0	0	0	0
	Total	14	5	0	0	25
- Source: As of 18 November 2026

Patrick Ah Van (born 17 March 1988) is a Samoa international rugby league & rugby union footballer who plays as a winger for the New Brighton FC in the ADM Lancashire Championship League competition.

He previously played for the New Zealand Warriors in the NRL, and for the Bradford Bulls and the Widnes Vikings in the Super League. Ah Van also spent time on loan from Widnes at North Wales in the third tier. He also had another spell with the Vikings in the Championship and played for Villeghailhenc-Aragon XIII in the Elite 2 Championship.

== Early life ==
Ah Van was born in Auckland, New Zealand. He is of Samoan and Chinese descent. His brothers Tom and Ralph are also rugby league players with Tom previously playing for the Warriors Under 20s, and Ralph an ex Vulcans player.

Educated at Kelston Boys' High School, Ah Van played for New Lynn Stags and Te Atatu Roosters in the Auckland Rugby League competition before playing for the Mount Albert Lions in the Bartercard Cup.

== Club career ==
=== New Zealand Warriors ===
Ah Van made his début for the New Zealand Warriors in 2006 against the Manly-Warringah Sea Eagles. He went on to play in fifty four games for the club. In 2007 he also played for the Auckland Lions in the NSWRL Premier League, and he played for the Auckland Vulcans in the 2009 and 2010 NSW Cup competitions. In 2008, his third year at the club, Ah Van was still young enough to be eligible for the Toyota Cup team, and made thirteen appearances for the Junior Warriors, scoring six tries.

=== Bradford ===
It was announced on 31 August 2010 that Ah Van had been released from the last year of his Warriors contract so he could sign a one-year deal with Bradford for the 2011 season.

2011 - 2011 Season

Ah Van appeared in three of the four pre-season games. He played against Halifax, Dewsbury Rams and Wakefield Trinity. He scored against Halifax (6 goals), Dewsbury (1 try, 7 goals) and Wakefield Trinity (2 tries, 4 goals).

Ah Van featured in all the games that season except for Round 10 against Salford, he scored 12 tries and kicked 97 goals for a total of 242 points.

=== Widnes ===
It was announced on 2 August 2011 that Ah Van had signed a two-year contract with Widnes for the 2012 and 2013 seasons.

2012

Ah Van appeared in all three of Widnes' friendlies. He played against Warrington, Swinton and St. Helens. He scored against Warrington (3 goals), Swinton (1 goal) and St Helens (2 goals).

Ah Van featured in five consecutive games from Round 1 (Wakefield Trinity) to Round 5 (Hull Kingston Rovers). He also featured in three consecutive games from Round 10 Warrington to Round 12 (St. Helens). He featured in ten consecutive games from Round 14 (Catalans Dragons) to Round 24 (Leeds). He also appeared on the wing in the 40-38 Challenge Cup loss to St. Helens. He has scored 132 points this season, (16 tries, 34 goals).

2013

He missed Rounds 1-4 due to an injury. He featured in Round 5 (Hull) to Round 9 (Warrington). Ah Van was injured for Round 10–11. He featured in Round 12 (Castleford Tigers) to Round 13 (Wakefield Trinity). He was injured for Round 14–17. He returned to Round 18 (Wigan Warriors) to Round 27 (Salford). He also played in the Challenge Cup against Doncaster and Wigan Warriors. He has scored 116 points this season, (18 tries, 22 goals).

2014

He missed Rounds 1-5 due to injury. He featured in Round 6 (Hull F.C.) to Round 7 (Bradford). He scored 10 points this season, (2 tries, 1 goal). (For 2014 Super League season highlights, stats and results click on 2014 Super League season results)

=== Villegailhenc-Aragon XIII ===
He joined French club Villegailhenc-Aragon for the 2018–19 season.

=== Sale FC ===
In 2019–20, Ah Van played four games for rugby union club Sale FC.

=== Villegailhenc-Aragon XIII (re-join) ===
On 12 October 2020 it was reported that he had re-signed for Villegailhenc-Aragon XIII in the Elite Two Championship

=== North Wales Crusaders ===
On 11 April 2021, it was reported that he had signed for the North Wales Crusaders in RFL League 1. Since he signed for the Welsh club in 2021, he's helped them get them 3rd place in successive seasons. In addition, he has also helped them through injury hit games by playing in halfback. He also helped them in a cup run playing against Hunslet R.L.F.C., played at Caldy RUFC, with an injury and helped the side.

=== Oldham RLFC ===
On 15 October 2022 it was reported that he had signed for the Oldham RLFC in RFL League 1.

=== Anselmians RUFC ===
In September 2023, Patrick Ah Van joined Rugby Union club Anselmians RUFC who are playing their inaugural season (2023/24) at Tier 5, of the English rugby pyramid, in Regional 1 North West . Anselmians are based in Eastham on The Wirral Peninsula

=== North Wales Crusaders (re-join) ===
On 16 November 2023 it was reported that he had signed for North Wales Crusaders in the RFL League 1 for the 2024 season.

=== Swinton Lions ===
On 1 May 2026 it was reported that he had signed for Swinton Lions in the RFL Championship

=== New Brighton FC ===
On 28 September 2026 it was confirmed that he had departed Swinton Lions and joined Merseyside rugby union club New Brighton FC

== International career ==
Ah Van was a New Zealand representative from an early age. In 2002 and 2003 he made the New Zealand Under-16 side while in 2005 he played for both the Junior Kiwis and New Zealand Residents sides. He captained the Junior Kiwis in 2007.

In 2006 he was named in the New Zealand training squad for the 2006 Rugby League Tri-Nations but had to withdraw due to injury.

He was named in the Samoa training squad for the 2008 Rugby League World Cup but chose not to represent Samoa and so was not selected in the final squad.

In 2009 he was named as part of the Samoan side for the Pacific Cup.

== Career statistics ==
Season	Appearance	Tries	Goals	D/G	Points
2011 Bradford	28	12	97	0	242
2012 Widnes	20	16	34	0	132
2013 Widnes	19	18	22	0	116
2014 Widnes	2	2	1	0	10
Total	69	48	154	0	500
