= Shad Royston =

Australian rugby league footballer

Personal information
- Born: 29 November 1982 (age 42); Australia
- Height: 178 cm (5 ft 10 in)
- Weight: 94 kg (14 st 11 lb)

Playing information
- Position: Fullback, Centre, Loose forward, Second-row
Club
| Years | Team | Pld | T | G | FG | P |
|---|---|---|---|---|---|---|
| 2004–05 | Batley Bulldogs | 50 | 21 | 0 | 0 | 84 |
| 2006 | Doncaster Lakers | 29 | 24 | 0 | 0 | 96 |
| 2006–10 | Halifax | 102 | 103 | 0 | 0 | 412 |
| 2011 | Bradford Bulls | 20 | 12 | 0 | 0 | 48 |
| | Total | 201 | 160 | 0 | 0 | 640 |
- Source: As of 4 September 2011

Shad Royston (born 29 November 1982) is an Australian former professional rugby league footballer who played in the 2000s, he played over 200 professional games in the United Kingdom. He spent more than half his professional career with Halifax.

On 11 August 2011 it was announced that Royston had turned down a contract extension with the Bradford Bulls, and would be moving to France after signing with Pia Donkeys for the 2012 season.

Before joining Halifax in 2006, Royston played at Doncaster Lakers and Batley Bulldogs. His best known position is fullback but can also operate at centre and lock.

== Bradford Bulls ==
On 18 September 2010 it was announced that Bradford Bulls had signed Royston for the 2011 campaign.

2011 – 2011 Season

Royston featured in two of the four pre-season friendlies. He played against his old club Halifax and Wakefield Trinity Wildcats. He scored a try against Halifax.

Shad featured in four consecutive games from Round 1 (Leeds Rhinos) until Round 4 (Wakefield Trinity Wildcats), he returned to play in another four games between Round 6 (Castleford Tigers) and Round 9 (Hull FC). Royston then played in six consecutive games from Round 11 (Leeds Rhinos) to Round 16 (Harlequins RL). He then featured in Round 18 (Hull FC), Round 21 (Castleford Tigers), Round 25 (Wigan Warriors) and he returned to the team for the final game against Wakefield Trinity Wildcats. Shad was the Bradford Bull's top try scorer this season, scoring 12 tries: Crusaders (1 try), Wakefield Trinity Wildcats (3 tries), Castleford Tigers (1 try), Harlequins RL (1 try) and Hull FC (4 tries). Royston also appeared in both Challenge Cup games against Halifax and Wigan Warriors. He scored a try in each game.

Royston was named the Frontline Player of Round 16 for his performance against Harlequins RL. He also received Bradford Bull's 2011 Try of the Season award for his length of the field effort against Harlequins RL in Round 16.

== Halifax RLFC ==
In November 2006 it was announced that Royston had signed with Halifax.

Shad was with the club for four seasons from 2007 until the end of the 2010 campaign. He made 101 appearances for the club, scoring 103 tries in process.
