= Marc Herbert =

Australian rugby league footballer

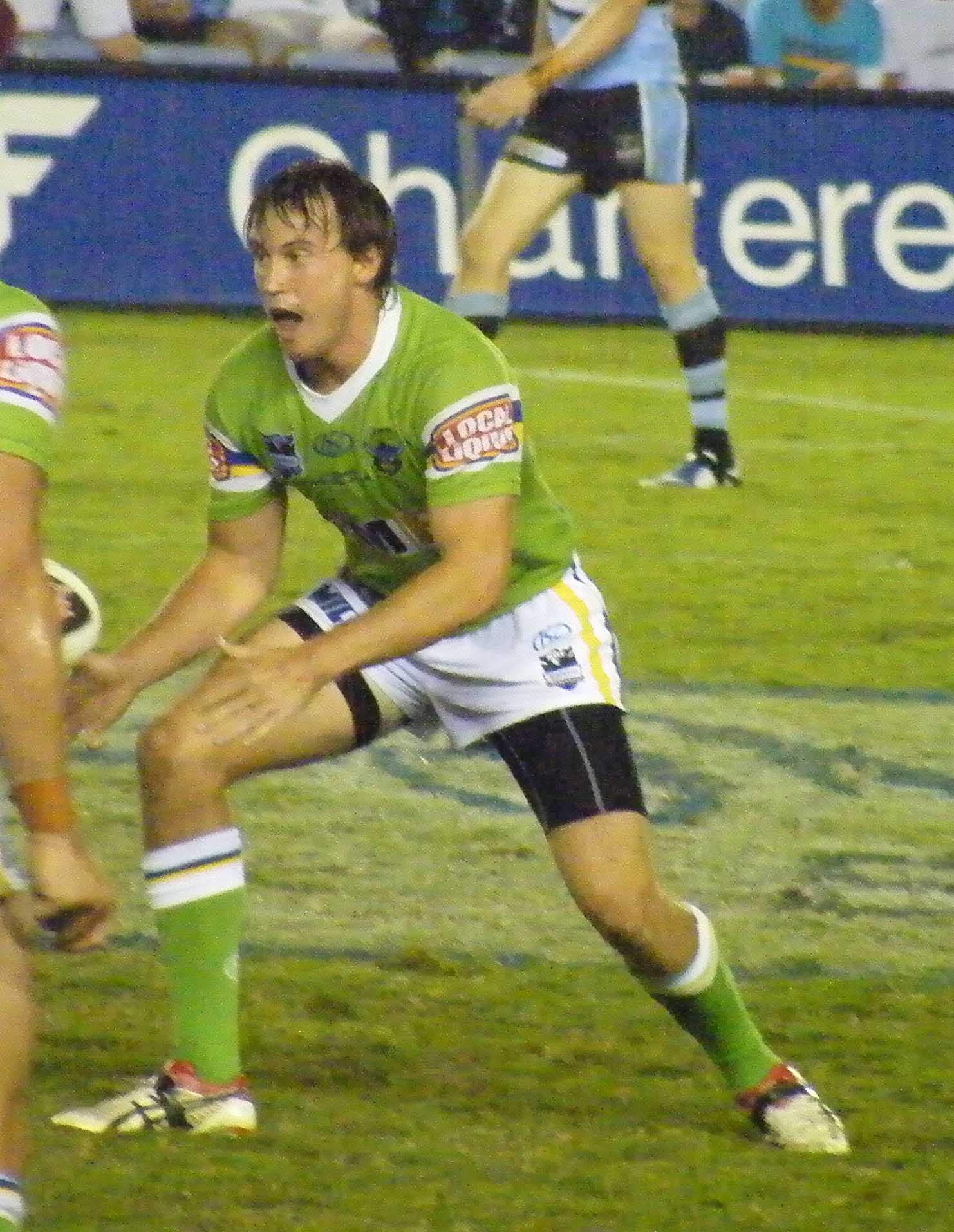
- Marc Herbert playing for the Canberra Raiders

Personal information
- Full name: Marc Herbert
- Born: 7 January 1987 (age 38); Canberra, Australian Capital Territory, Australia
- Height: 183 cm (6 ft 0 in)
- Weight: 85 kg (13 st 5 lb)

Playing information
- Position: Halfback, Five-eighth
Club
| Years | Team | Pld | T | G | FG | P |
|---|---|---|---|---|---|---|
| 2008–10 | Canberra Raiders | 23 | 2 | 6 | 1 | 21 |
| 2011 | Bradford Bulls | 21 | 4 | 2 | 0 | 20 |
| | Total | 44 | 6 | 8 | 1 | 41 |
- As of 4 September 2011

Marc Herbert (born 7 January 1987), also known by the nicknames of "Marty", and "Herby", is a professional rugby league footballer, who currently plays halfback in the Canberra Rugby League Competition. He made his NRL début in the Round 20 clash against the Gold Coast Titans, in place of the suspended Todd Carney.

== 2008 ==
After three seasons playing for their developmental sides, Herbert made his first grade début for the Raiders in 2008.

== 2010 ==
On 29 October 2010, Herbert agreed to a one-year deal with the Bradford Bulls, as a direct replacement for Matt Orford. He undertook pre-season training with the Bulls in November, and is the 10th signing the club has made. Bradford beat off stiff competition from Hull F.C. and another unnamed Super League team.

== 2011 ==
In the 2011 Season Herbert appeared in two of the four pre-season games. He played against Halifax and Wakefield Trinity Wildcats. He scored a try and a goal against Halifax and kicked a goal against Wakefield.

He featured in ten consecutive games from Round 4 (Wakefield Trinity Wildcats to Round 13 (Warrington Wolves). He missed a couple of games due to injury but then returned and played ten consecutive games from Round 16 (Harlequins RL) to Round 25 (Wigan Warriors). A broken hand ended Herbert's Bulls career early. He also featured in the Challenge Cup game against Halifax. Herbert has scored against Huddersfield Giants (1 try), Salford City Reds (2 tries, 2 goals) and Hull Kingston Rovers (1 try).

== 2015 ==
Herbert has been playing for the Queanbeyan Blues in the Canberra Rugby League Competition for 2015.

== Personal life ==
Herbert currently works as a project engineer in Canberra.
