= George M. Rush Stadium =

American football stadium in San Francisco, CA

Rams Stadium
- Interactive map of Rams Stadium
- Location: San Francisco, California
- Coordinates: 37.725556°N 122.448611°W
- Owner: City College of San Francisco
- Capacity: 5,000
- Surface: Hellas Matrix Helix turf with Elia Renufill infill.

George M. Rush Stadium, known as Rams Stadium until 2015, is a multi-purpose football stadium in San Francisco, California. Located on the campus of City College of San Francisco the stadium has a capacity of 5,000.

== Stadium Tenants ==
Football, as well as track and field, use the Stadium. A new FieldTurf soccer practice field has been built north of the stadium.

Teams from the Academy of Art University and Lick-Wilmerding High School also lease the field for their use.
