= Heath L'Estrange =

Australian former professional rugby league footballer

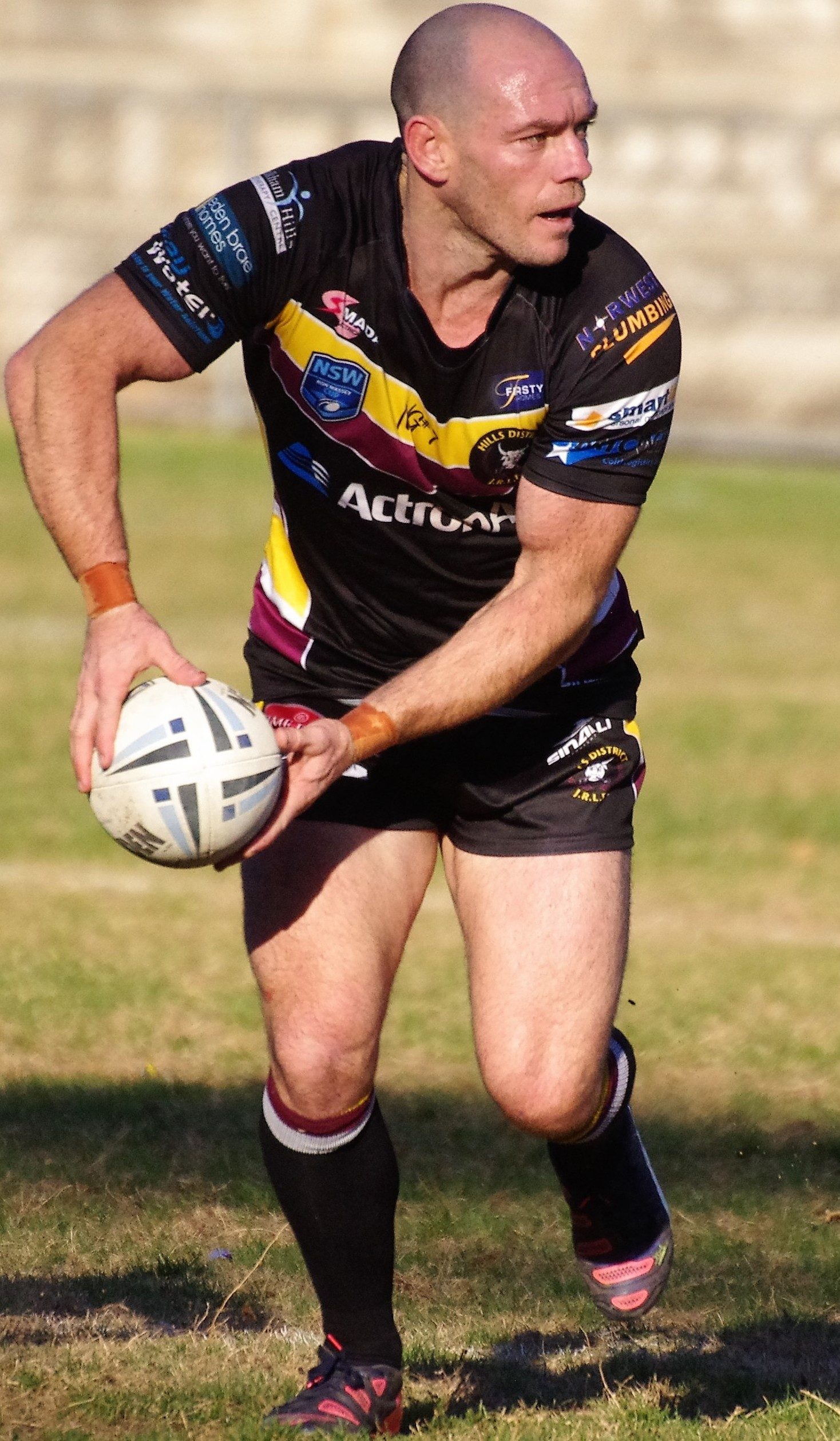

Personal information
- Born: 21 May 1985 (age 41) Sydney, New South Wales, Australia

Playing information
- Height: 176 cm (5 ft 9 in)
- Weight: 88 kg (13 st 12 lb)
- Position: Hooker
Club
Years	Team	Pld	T	G	FG	P
2004–07	Sydney Roosters	29	1	0	0	4
2008–09	Manly Sea Eagles	44	2	0	0	8
2010–13	Bradford Bulls	99	8	0	0	32
2014	Sydney Roosters	5	0	0	0	0
2015	St. George Illawarra	16	0	0	0	0
	Total	193	11	0	0	44
Representative
Years	Team	Pld	T	G	FG	P
2012–13	Exiles	2	0	0	0	0

Heath L'Estrange (born 21 May 1985), also known by the nickname of "Stranger", is an Australian former professional rugby league footballer. He played for the Sydney Roosters, Manly Warringah Sea Eagles and the St. George Illawarra Dragons in the National Rugby League, and the Bradford Bulls in the Super League. In his rugby league career, he won the 2008 NRL Grand Final with the Sea Eagles. He played as hooker.

== Background ==
L'Estrange was born in Sydney, New South Wales, Australia.

While attending Terra Sancta College, L'Estrange played for the Australian Schoolboys team in 2002 and 2003.

== Playing career ==
=== Sydney Roosters: 2004-2007 ===
L'Estrange signed for the club in late 2003. He made his first grade début on 9 April 2004 against the Brisbane Broncos during round 5 at Sydney Football Stadium where he scored two tries.

L'Estrange played in the 2006 NSW Cup grand final for Newtown who were the Sydney Roosters feeder club at the time against Parramatta. Newtown would lose the grand final 20-19 at Stadium Australia.

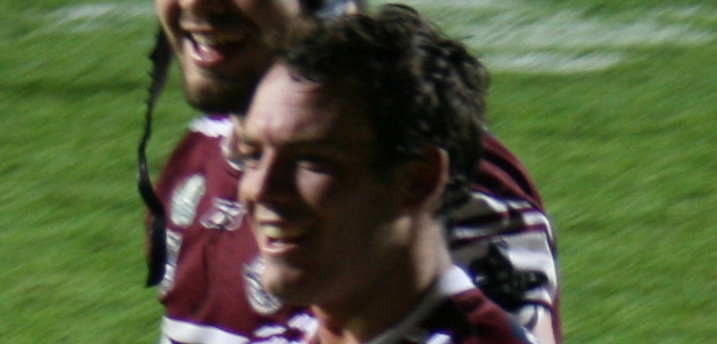
L'Estrange post-game with the Manly Sea Eagles

=== Manly-Warringah Sea Eagles: 2008-09 ===
L'Estrange played in the 2008 NRL Grand Final victory over the Melbourne Storm. Manly won the match 40-0 which as of the 2024 season is the biggest winning margin in a grand final.

=== Bradford Bulls: 2010-13 ===
L'Estrange signed a two-year contract with Super League club Bradford Bulls for 2010; he was seen as a replacement for Terry Newton. L'Estrange re-signed with Bradford for a three-year deal midway through the 2011 season. After the 2013 season he was released from his contract on compassionate grounds where he would later sign a one-year contract with the Sydney Roosters.

=== Sydney Roosters: 2014 ===
The Sydney Roosters signed L'Estrange after he was released by Bradford. On 29 October, L'Estrange signed a one- year deal with the St. George Illawarra Dragons for the 2015 NRL season.

=== St George Illawarra Dragons: 2015 ===
On 2 October, L'Estrange announced his retirement from first grade rugby league.

=== Hills District Bulls ===
On 28 August 2017, L'Estrange was named in the 2017 Ron Massey Cup team of the year.

== Representative ==
=== France ===
He was named in the France squad for the Rugby League World Cup 2008.

=== Exiles ===
L'Estrange played two games for the Exiles.
