= Vinny Finigan =

English rugby league footballer

Personal information
- Born: 4 August 1989 (age 36); Oldham, England
- Height: 5 ft 11 in (180 cm)
- Weight: 15 st 2 lb (96 kg)

Playing information
- Position: Wing, Fullback
Club
Years	Team	Pld	T	G	FG	P
2010–11	Bradford Bulls	5	4	0	0	16
2011–13	Sheffield Eagles	54	25	0	0	100
2013(loan)	→ Dewsbury Rams	2	0	0	0	0
2014	Batley Bulldogs	16	5	0	0	20
2015	Hunslet Hawks	14	3	0	0	12
2015(DR)	→ Hemel Stags	2	2	0	0	8
2016–17	Keighley Cougars	27	14	0	0	56
2018–	London Skolars	18	10	0	0	40
	Total	138	63	0	0	252
- Source: As of 17 May 2018

Vinny Finigan (born 4 August 1989), also known by the nickname of "Fini", is an English professional, rugby league footballer who plays for London Skolars. He is of Irish descent.

== Bradford bulls ==
Vinny Finigan is a product of the Bradford Academy.

Finigan made his début in Round 22 (Salford) of the 2010 Season on the wing, in place of the injured Stuart Reardon. He played for the rest of the season including Round 27 (Wigan). Finigan scored against Salford (2 tries) and Hull Kingston Rovers (2 tries). At the end of the 2010 season Finigan was given a professional contract keeping him at Bradford for another year.

In 2011 Finigan featured in three of the four pre-season games. He played against Halifax, Dewsbury and Keighley. Finigan scored against Dewsbury (2 tries) and Keighley (1 try).

He was not selected to play in any of the league or cup games this season. Finigan was dual registered with Championship side Sheffield Eagles.

== Sheffield Eagles ==
Finigan was released from Bradford and he signed for Championship side Sheffield Eagles on a one-year deal. He signed an extension to his contract at the end of the year and played for two seasons for the Eagles.

== Batley Bulldogs ==
After leaving Sheffield at the end of 2013, Finnigan joined Batley for the 2014 season. After a single season he moved to Hunslet Hawks

== Hunslet Hawks ==
Three tries in 14 appearances during the 2015 season were all the appearances made by Finnigan for Hunslet as the club were relegated from the Championship to League 1. He also appeared twice for Hemel Stags on loan scoring two tries.

== Keighley Cougars ==
Finigan signed for Keighley in October 2015. Scoring 9 tries in 13 games during the 2016 season, he extended his contract for 2017 but was released towards the end of the 2017 season.
