= Peter Hood =

British rugby league footballer

Peter Hood is the former chairman of the Bradford Bulls, an English rugby league squad.
