= Gareth Raynor =

GB & England international rugby league & union footballer

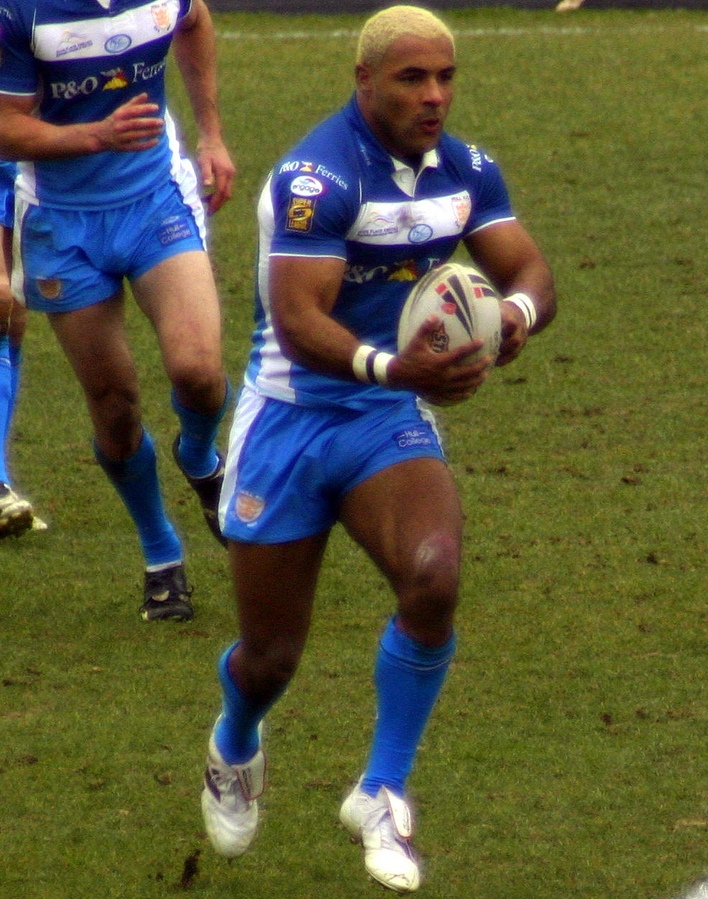

Personal information
- Full name: Gareth Raynor
- Born: 24 February 1978 (age 48) Leeds, West Yorkshire, England

Playing information
- Height: 5 ft 10 in (1.78 m)
- Weight: 14 st 9 lb (93 kg)

Rugby league
- Position: Wing
Club
| Years | Team | Pld | T | G | FG | P |
|---|---|---|---|---|---|---|
| 2000–01 | Leeds Rhinos | 3 | 0 | 0 | 0 | 0 |
| 2001–02 | Hull FC | 53 | 25 | 0 | 0 | 100 |
| 2003–09 | Hull FC | 146 | 82 | 0 | 0 | 328 |
| 2010 | Crusaders RL | 7 | 4 | 0 | 0 | 16 |
| 2011 | Bradford Bulls | 20 | 6 | 0 | 0 | 24 |
| 2012 | Featherstone Rovers | 4 | 3 | 0 | 0 | 12 |
| 2013 | London Skolars | 8 | 5 | 0 | 0 | 20 |
| | Total | 241 | 125 | 0 | 0 | 500 |
Representative
| Years | Team | Pld | T | G | FG | P |
| 2004 | England | 2 | 4 | 0 | 0 | 16 |
| 2005–07 | Great Britain | 6 | 3 | 0 | 0 | 12 |

Rugby union
- Position: Wing
Club
| Years | Team | Pld | T | G | FG | P |
|---|---|---|---|---|---|---|
| 2000 | Leeds Tykes | 8 | 1 | 0 | 0 | 5 |
| 2002–03 | Leicester Tigers | 3 | 0 | 0 | 0 | 0 |
| | Total | 11 | 1 | 0 | 0 | 5 |

Gareth Raynor (born 24 February 1978) is an English former professional rugby union and rugby league footballer who last played for the London Skolars in Championship 1. He is a former Great Britain international who previously played for Hull FC, the Crusaders, the Leeds Rhinos, and the Bradford Bulls in the Super League. Plus a spell with Aviva Premiership side, Leicester Tigers.

== Background ==
Raynor was born in Leeds, West Yorkshire, England. He started his career in rugby union as a centre. He started out at Pontefract RU and later moved onto Castleford Panthers before Leeds Tykes stumbled upon his performances and took a keen interest. It was not long after that he moved to the Tykes in 2000. He made 8 appearances (4 as substitute) for the Tykes in their Division One season.

Raynor left the Tykes in the summer and switched codes to play Rugby league for big next door club, Leeds Rhinos.

== Professional playing career ==
=== 2000s ===
Gareth transferred to Leeds in the summer of 2000 and made three off the bench performances for the Rhinos. With little game time Gareth moved to Hull F.C. on a two-year contract. Injury to established winger Chris Smith led to more starts than expected for Raynor and he soon became a fans' favourite. After the 2002 Super League season, he returned to rugby union and played for the Leicester Tigers. He made four appearances in the 2002–03 season for the Leicester Tigers with two from the substitute bench before leaving to return to rugby league with Hull F.C. midway through the 2003's Super League VIII.

Raynor was a regular at Hull FC after a successful season on the wing with 18 tries in all competitions at the end of 2005. Raynor played for Hull at centre in the 2005 Challenge Cup final, scoring a try in their victory against the Leeds Rhinos. Hull reached the 2006 Super League Grand final to be contested against St Helens, and Raynor played on the wing in his side's 4–26 loss. He became a Great Britain international, starring in the 2006 Tri Nations.

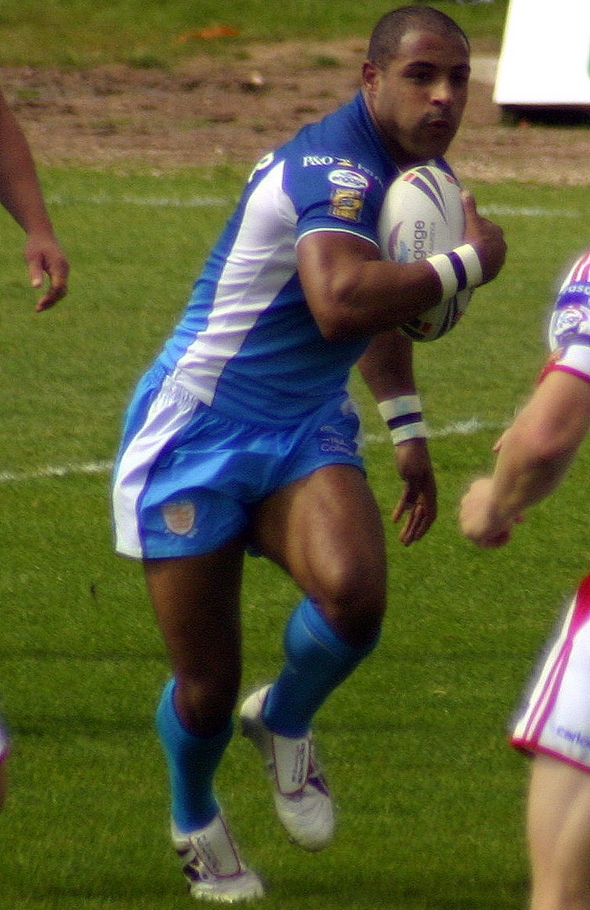
Gareth Raynor in action for Hull FC

He was forced to rule himself out of contention for the England training squad for the 2008 Rugby League World Cup through injury.

=== 2010s ===
For 2010's Super League XV, Raynor signed for Crusaders on a short-term deal, pending the results of his upcoming court case. During the opening match of 2010's Super League XV against Leeds Rhinos, Raynor scored Crusaders first try of the season and only try of the match, going on to lose 34–6.

In May 2010, Raynor was jailed for 15 months for his part in a fake ink cartridge and computer games scam, and for breaching a previously suspended sentence relating to an assault. He was granted an early release after serving seven months of his sentence.

On 16 September 2010 it was confirmed that he had signed a 1-year deal with the Bradford Bulls. Raynor featured in three of the four pre-season games. He played against Halifax, Dewsbury Rams and Wakefield Trinity Wildcats. He scored a try against Halifax.

Gareth was featured from Round 1 (Leeds Rhinos) to Round 5 (Huddersfield Giants). He picked up an injury then returned in Round 10 (Salford City Reds) through to Round 12 (Catalans Dragons). Raynor's next game would be Round 14 (Hull Kingston Rovers), he was suspended for the next two games. He then played in Round 17 (St. Helens). Gareth then played in seven consecutive games from Round 19 (Leeds Rhinos) until Round 25 (Wigan Warriors). Raynor was then featured in Round 27 (Wakefield Trinity Wildcats). He also appeared in the Challenge Cup games against Halifax and Wigan Warriors during this match he was sent off for punching Sam Tomkins. He scored tries against Huddersfield Giants (1 try), Hull Kingston Rovers (1 try), Catalans Dragons (1 try), Castleford Tigers (1 try) and Halifax (2 tries). He signed a 1-year extension with the Bradford Bulls.

His contract with Bradford was terminated in September 2011 for "a severe breach of club discipline".

He signed for the Featherstone Rovers for the 2012 season, but he only played 4-matches, scoring 3-tries.

After 22 July 2013 he signed a year-long contract with the London Skolars in the Kingstone Press Championship 1 which proved as quite a shock to all the rugby league admirers. He provided a try 2 minutes into his début for the London Skolars against Oldham.
