= 2013 Super League season =

British rugby league season

Super League XVIII
- League: Super League
- Duration: 27 Rounds
- Teams: 14
- Highest attendance: 23,861; Wigan Warriors v St Helens (29 March)
- Lowest attendance: 1,136; London Broncos v Catalans Dragons (28 March)
- Average attendance: 9,048
- Broadcast partners: Sky Sports; BBC Sport; Eurosport beIN Sports; Fox Soccer Plus; Sport Klub

2013 season
- Champions: Wigan Warriors; 3rd Super League title 20th British title
- League Leaders: Huddersfield Giants
- Biggest home win: Hull F.C. 72-10 Widnes Vikings (2 August)
- Biggest away win: Hull Kingston Rovers 6-84 Wigan Warriors (1 April)
- Man of Steel: (Scotland) Danny Brough
- Top point-scorer: (Scotland) Danny Brough (281)
- Top try-scorer: (England) Josh Charnley (33)

Super League XVIII was the official name for the 2013 Super League season. Fourteen teams competed over 27 rounds, after which the highest finishing teams entered the play-offs to compete for a place in the Grand Final and a chance to win the championship and the Super League Trophy.

== Teams ==
Super League XVIII was the second year of a licensed Super League. Under this system, promotion and relegation between Super League and Championship was abolished, and 14 teams were granted licences subject to certain criteria. For the 2013 season, all fourteen teams from the previous season will compete, including the Bradford Bulls, who were given a one-year probationary licence after going into administration and taken over by the Omar Khan consortium in the 2012 season.

Geographically, the vast majority of teams in Super League are based in the north of England, five teams – Warrington, St. Helens, Salford, Wigan and Widnes – to the west of the Pennines in Cheshire, Greater Manchester and Merseyside, and seven teams to the east in Yorkshire – Huddersfield, Bradford, Wakefield Trinity, Leeds, Castleford, Hull F.C. and Hull Kingston Rovers. Catalans Dragons are the only team based in France and are outside of the UK and London Broncos are the only team to be based in a capital city (London).

The maps below indicate the locations of teams that competed in Super League XVIII.

Team	Stadium	Capacity	City/Area
Bradford Bulls (2013 season)	Provident Stadium	27,000	Bradford, West Yorkshire
Castleford Tigers (2013 season)	The Wish Communications Stadium	11,750	Castleford, West Yorkshire
Catalans Dragons (2013 season)	Stade Gilbert Brutus	14,000	Perpignan, Pyrénées-Orientales, France
Huddersfield Giants (2013 season)	John Smith's Stadium	24,544	Huddersfield, West Yorkshire
Hull F.C. (2013 season)	Kingston Communications Stadium	25,404	Kingston upon Hull, East Riding of Yorkshire
Hull Kingston Rovers (2013 season)	MS3 Craven Park	9,471	Kingston upon Hull, East Riding of Yorkshire
Leeds Rhinos (2013 season)	Headingley Carnegie Stadium	22,250	Leeds, West Yorkshire
London Broncos (2013 season)	Twickenham Stoop	12,700	Twickenham, London
Salford City Reds (2013 season)	Salford City Stadium	12,000	Salford, Greater Manchester
St Helens R.F.C. (2013 season)	Langtree Park	18,000	St. Helens, Merseyside
Wakefield Trinity Wildcats (2013 season)	Rapid Solicitors Stadium	11,000	Wakefield, West Yorkshire
Warrington Wolves (2013 season)	Halliwell Jones Stadium	15,500	Warrington, Cheshire
Widnes Vikings (2013 season)	The Select Security Stadium	13,500	Widnes, Cheshire, England
Wigan Warriors (2013 season)	DW Stadium	25,138	Wigan, Greater Manchester

Legend
Reigning Super League champions
Defending Challenge Cup Champions

== Rule changes ==
For the 2013 season, the Rugby Football League has introduced a number of rule changes, which will also apply to the 2013 RFL Championship and Championship 1 seasons. This follows trial runs of the proposed rules during Boxing Day friendlies between Leeds Rhinos and Wakefield Trinity Wildcats

Rule changes include changes to the advantage rule, scrummage, marker tackle ruling, plus various changes to the out of play (ball-in-touch, touch-in-goal and dead-in-goal) rulings.

== Results ==
The regular league season sees the 14 teams play each other twice (one home, one away) plus an additional match, as part of the Magic Weekend, over 27 matches. The team who finishes 1st at the end of the regular season win the League Leaders' Shield.

== Table ==
Super League XVIII
Pos	Team	Pld	W	D	L	PF	PA	PD	Pts	Qualification
1	Huddersfield Giants (L)	27	21	0	6	851	507	+344	42	Play-offs
2	Warrington Wolves	27	20	1	6	836	461	+375	41	Play-offs
3	Leeds Rhinos	27	18	1	8	712	507	+205	37	Play-offs
4	Wigan Warriors (C)	27	17	1	9	816	460	+356	35	Play-offs
5	St. Helens	27	15	1	11	678	536	+142	31	Play-offs
6	Hull F.C.	27	13	2	12	652	563	+89	28	Play-offs
7	Catalans Dragons	27	13	2	12	619	604	+15	28	Play-offs
8	Hull Kingston Rovers	27	13	0	14	642	760	−118	26	Play-offs
9	Bradford Bulls	27	10	2	15	640	658	−18	22	
10	Widnes Vikings	27	10	2	15	695	841	−146	22	
11	Wakefield Trinity Wildcats	27	10	1	16	660	749	−89	21	
12	Castleford Tigers	27	9	2	16	702	881	−179	20	
13	London Broncos	27	5	2	20	487	946	−459	12	
14	Salford City Reds	27	6	1	20	436	953	−517	11 (Note: Salford deducted 2 points on 14 June 2013 for fielding 14 players during home game against Castleford)	

Source: superleague.co.uk and BBC Sport
Rules for classification: 1st on competition points; 2nd on match points difference. Competition points: for win = 2; for draw = 1; for loss = 0.
(C) Champions; (L) League Leaders' Shield Winners

== Play-offs ==
Qualifying/Elimination playoffs
1	Huddersfield Giants	8
4	Wigan Warriors	22
5	St Helens R.F.C.	46
8	Hull Kingston Rovers	10
6	Hull F.C.	14
7	Catalans Dragons	4
2	Warrington Wolves	40
3	Leeds Rhinos	20

Preliminary semifinals
Huddersfield Giants	76
Hull F.C.	18
St Helens R.F.C.	10
Leeds Rhinos	11

Qualifying semifinals
Wigan Warriors	22
Leeds Rhinos	12
Warrington select in club call
Warrington Wolves	30
Huddersfield Giants	22

Grand Final
Old Trafford
Wigan Warriors	30
Warrington Wolves	16

Week 1. Qualifying/Elimination play-offs: Fixtures decided by regular reason finishing positions. Higher ranked teams play lower ranked teams. Higher ranked teams receive home ground advantage.
Week 2. Preliminary semi-finals: Fixtures decided by regular season finishing positions. Higher ranked teams play lower ranked teams. Higher ranked teams receive home ground advantage.
Week 3. Qualifying semi-finals: Winners of Qualifying play-offs play winners of Qualifying semi-finals. Fixtures decided by club call. Winners of Qualifying play-offs receive home ground advantage.

#	Home	Score	Away	Match Information
#	Home	Score	Away	Date and Time (Local)	Venue	Referee	Attendance
QUALIFYING AND ELIMINATION FINALS
Q1	Huddersfield Giants	8 – 22	Wigan Warriors	12 September, 20:00 BST	John Smith's Stadium	Phil Bentham	8,000
Q2	Warrington Wolves	40 – 20	Leeds Rhinos	14 September, 15:00 BST	Halliwell Jones Stadium	James Child	8,695
E1	St Helens R.F.C.	46 – 10	Hull Kingston Rovers	14 September, 17:00 BST	Langtree Park	Richard Silverwood	9,926
E2	Hull F.C.	14 – 4	Catalans Dragons	13 September, 20:00 BST	KC Stadium	Ben Thaler	4,970
PRELIMINARY SEMI-FINALS
P1	Huddersfield Giants	76 – 18	Hull F.C.	19 September, 20:00 BST	John Smith's Stadium	Richard Silverwod	5,547
P2	Leeds Rhinos	11 – 10	St Helens R.F.C.	20 September, 20:00 BST	Headingley Carnegie Stadium	Phil Bentham	12,189
SEMI-FINALS
SF1	Wigan Warriors	22 – 12	Leeds Rhinos	27 September, 20:00 BST	DW Stadium	Phil Bentham	14,600
SF2	Warrington Wolves	30 – 22	Huddersfield Giants	26 September, 20:00 BST	Halliwell Jones Stadium	Richard Silverwood	10,042
GRAND FINAL
F	Wigan Warriors	30 – 16	Warrington Wolves	5 October, 18:00 BST	Old Trafford, Manchester	Richard Silverwood	66,281

== Player statistics ==
As of 29 September 2013

=== Top try-scorers ===
Rank	Player	Club	Tries
1	(England) Josh Charnley	Wigan Warriors	33
2	(Australia) Joel Monaghan	Warrington Wolves	25
3	(England) Sam Tomkins	Wigan Warriors	23
4	(Malta) Jarrod Sammut	Bradford Bulls	22
5	(Australia) Justin Carney	Castleford Tigers	21
6	(England) Aaron Murphy	Huddersfield Giants	20
7=	(England) Ben Crooks	Hull F.C.	19
7=	(England) Shaun Lunt	Huddersfield Giants	19
7=	(England) Jermaine McGillvary	Huddersfield Giants	19
10	(England) Kieran Dixon	London Broncos	18

=== Top try assists ===
Rank	Player	Club	Assists
1	(England) Rangi Chase	Castleford Tigers	35
2	(Scotland) Danny Brough	Huddersfield Giants	32
3	(Australia) Michael Dobson	Hull Kingston Rovers	26
4	(Australia) Rhys Hanbury	Widnes Vikings	24
4	(England) Richie Myler	Warrington Wolves	24
6	(England) Kevin Brown	Huddersfield Giants	21
7=	(England) Leon Pryce	Catalans Dragons	20
7=	(England) Stefan Ratchford	Warrington Wolves	20
7=	(England) Sam Tomkins	Wigan Warriors	20
10	(Australia) Tim Smith	Wakefield Trinity Wildcats	19

=== Top goalscorers ===
Rank	Player	Club	Goals
1	(Scotland) Danny Brough	Huddersfield Giants	144
2	(England) Kevin Sinfield	Leeds Rhinos	99
3	(Australia) Pat Richards	Wigan Warriors	96
4	(Australia) Michael Dobson	Hull Kingston Rovers	84
5	(France) Thomas Bosc	Catalans Dragons	78
6	(England) Jamie Foster	Bradford Bulls	67
7	(Australia) Brett Hodgson	Warrington Wolves	65
8	(England) Jack Owens	Widnes Vikings	60
9	(England) Jamie Ellis	Castleford Tigers	57
10	(England) Marc Sneyd	Salford City Reds	55

=== Top points scorers ===
Rank	Player	Club	Points
1	(Scotland) Danny Brough	Huddersfield Giants	281
2	(Australia) Pat Richards	Wigan Warriors	239
3	(England) Kevin Sinfield	Leeds Rhinos	202
4	(Australia) Michael Dobson	Hull Kingston Rovers	191
5	(France) Thomas Bosc	Catalans Dragons	167
6	(Australia) Brett Hodgson	Warrington Wolves	157
7	(England) Jamie Foster	Bradford Bulls	154
8	(England) Jack Owens	Widnes Vikings	152
9	(England) Lee Smith	Wakefield Trinity Wildcats	146
10	(England) Josh Charnley	Wigan Warriors	142

=== Discipline ===
==== Red Cards ====
Rank	Player	Club	Red card
1=	(England) Ryan Bailey	Leeds Rhinos	1
1=	(France) Julian Bousquet	Catalans Dragons	1
1=	(New Zealand) Hep Cahill	Widnes Vikings	1
1=	(Australia) Ben Cross	Widnes Vikings	1
1=	(New Zealand) Weller Hauraki	Castleford Tigers	1
1=	(England) Gareth Hock	Widnes Vikings	1
1=	(England) Lee Jewitt	Salford City Reds	1
1=	(Australia) Justin Poore	Wakefield Trinity Wildcats	1
1=	(England) Luke Robinson	Huddersfield Giants	1
1=	(England) Danny Tickle	Hull F.C.	1
1=	(England) Adam Walker	Hull Kingston Rovers	1

==== Yellow Cards ====
Rank	Player	Club	Yellow card
1	(Australia) Travis Burns	Hull Kingston Rovers	3
2=	(England) Kevin Brown	Widnes Vikings	2
2=	(England) Rangi Chase	Castleford Tigers	2
2=	(Australia) Justin Carney	Castleford Tigers	2
2=	(England) Graeme Horne	Hull Kingston Rovers	2
2=	(England) Louie McCarthy-Scarsbrook	St Helens R.F.C.	2
2=	(France) Antoni Maria	Catalans Dragons	2
2=	(Australia) Jamie Soward	London Broncos	2
2=	(New Zealand) Brent Webb	Catalans Dragons	2
10=	(England) Danny Addy	Bradford Bulls	1
10=	(England) Ryan Bailey	Leeds Rhinos	1
10=	(Republic of Ireland) Damien Blanch	Catalans Dragons	1
10=	(England) Danny Brough	Huddersfield Giants	1
10=	(England) Ben Cockayne	Wakefield Trinity Wildcats	1
10=	(England) Jamie Cording	Huddersfield Giants	1
10=	(England) Jon Clarke	Widnes Vikings	1
10=	(England) Matthew Cook	London Broncos	1
10=	(Wales) Gil Dudson	Wigan Warriors	1
10=	(Australia) Scott Dureau	Catalans Dragons	1
10=	(France) Olivier Elima	Catalans Dragons	1
10=	(England) Jamie Ellis	Castleford Tigers	1
10=	(Australia) Blake Green	Wigan Warriors	1
10=	(Republic of Ireland) Scott Grix	Huddersfield Giants	1
10=	(New Zealand) Weller Hauraki	Castleford Tigers	1
10=	(England) David Hodgson	Hull Kingston Rovers	1
10=	(England) Josh Hodgson	Hull Kingston Rovers	1
10=	(Australia) Brett Kearney	Bradford Bulls	1
10=	(England) Danny Kirmond	Wakefield Trinity Wildcats	1
10=	(United States) Nathan Massey	Castleford Tigers	1
10=	(England) Charlie Martin	Castleford Tigers	1
10=	(Australia) Grant Millington	Castleford Tigers	1
10=	(Australia) Mark O'Meley	Hull F.C.	1
10=	(Tonga) Mickey Paea	Hull Kingston Rovers	1
10=	(England) Larne Patrick	Huddersfield Giants	1
10=	(England) Jamie Peacock	Leeds Rhinos	1
10=	(England) Jay Pitts	Hull F.C.	1
10=	(France) Michael Simon	Catalans Dragons	1
10=	(Tonga) Ukuma Ta'ai	Huddersfield Giants	1
10=	(England) Sam Tomkins	Wigan Warriors	1
10=	(England) Paul Wellens	St Helens R.F.C.	1
10=	(England) Ben Westwood	Warrington Wolves	1
10=	(England) Elliott Whitehead	Bradford Bulls	1
10=	(Australia) Lincoln Withers	Hull Kingston Rovers	1
10=	(England) Kirk Yeaman	Hull F.C.	1

== End-of-season awards ==
Awards are presented for outstanding contributions and efforts to players and clubs in the week leading up to the Super League Grand Final:

The winners of the 2013 awards are:

- Man of Steel: Danny Brough (Huddersfield Giants)
- Coach of the year: Paul Anderson (Huddersfield Giants)
- Super League club of the year: St. Helens
- Young player of the year: Ben Crooks (Hull F.C.)
- Foundation of the year: Leeds Rhinos
- Rhino "Top Gun": Kevin Sinfield (Leeds Rhinos)
- Metre-maker: Jamie Peacock (Leeds Rhinos)
- Top Try Scorer: Josh Charnley (Wigan Warriors)
- Outstanding Achievement Award: Stuart Fielden (Huddersfield Giants) and Shaun Briscoe (Widnes Vikings)
- Hit Man: Danny Houghton (Hull F.C.)

== Media ==
=== Television ===
2013 is the second year of a five-year contract with Sky Sports to televise 70 matches per season. The deal which runs until 2016 is worth £90million.

Sky Sports coverage in the UK see two live matches broadcast each week – one on Friday night, which kicks-off at 8:00 pm and another usually on Saturday evenings at 5:45 pm, although for 2013, some matches between May and August will be scheduled for Monday nights, following the introduction during the 2012 season at 8:00 pm, filling the gap vacated by the summer break of Premier League football. The Monday night fixtures switched to Thursday nights from August 2013 following the resumption of the football season and also applies to the play-off fixtures.

Regular commentators were Eddie Hemmings and Mike Stephenson with summarisers including Phil Clarke, Shaun McRae, Brian Carney, Barrie McDermott and Terry O'Connor. Sky will broadcast highlights this season in a new show on Sunday Nights called Super League - Full Time, usually airing at 10pm.

BBC Sport broadcast a highlights programme called the Super League Show, presented by Tanya Arnold. The BBC show two weekly broadcasts of the programme. The first is only to the BBC North West, Yorkshire & North Midlands, North East & Cumbria, and East Yorkshire & Lincolnshire regions on Monday evenings at 11:35pm on BBC One, while a repeat showing is shown nationally on BBC Two on Tuesday afternoons at 1.30pm. The Super League Show is also available for one week after broadcast for streaming or download via the BBC iPlayer in the UK only. End of season play-offs are shown on BBC Two across the whole country in a weekly highlights package on Sunday afternoons.

Internationally, Super League is shown live or delayed on Showtime Sports (Middle East), Māori Television (New Zealand), TV 2 Sport (Norway), NTV+ (Russia), Fox Soccer Plus (United States), Eurosport (Australia) or Sportsnet World (Canada).

=== Radio ===
BBC Coverage:

- BBC Radio 5 Live Sports Extra (National DAB Digital Radio) normally carry one Super League commentary a week on Friday Nights.
- BBC Manchester will carry commentary of Wigan and Salford whilst sharing commentary of Warrington with BBC Merseyside.
- BBC Humberside will have full match commentary of all Hull KR and Hull matches.
- BBC Leeds carry commentaries featuring Bradford, Leeds, Castleford, Wakefield and Huddersfield.
- BBC Merseyside (AM/DAB only) will have commentary on St Helens and Widnes matches whilst sharing commentary of Warrington with BBC Manchester.
- BBC London 94.9 airs all London Broncos games home & away, mainly via online streaming only.

Commercial Radio Coverage:

- 102.4 Wish FM will carry commentaries of Wigan & St Helens matches.
- 107.2 Wire FM will carry commentaries on Warrington & Widnes Matches.
- BCB 106.6 (Bradford Community Broadcasting) have full match commentary of Bradford Bulls home and away.
- Yorkshire Radio increases its coverage to air 50 games in the 2012 season.
- Radio Warrington (Online Station) all Warrington home games and some away games.
- Grand Sud FM covers every Catalans Dragons Home Match (in French).
- Radio France Bleu Roussillon covers every Catalans Dragons Away Match (in French).

All Super League commentaries on any station are available via the particular stations on-line streaming.

=== Internet ===
ESPN3 has worldwide broadband rights.

Starting from Thursday 9 April 2009, all of the matches shown on Sky Sports will also be available live online via Livestation everywhere in the world excluding the US, Puerto Rico, UK, Ireland, France, Monaco, Australia and New Zealand. List of Super League games available on Livestation.com
