= 2013 Bradford Bulls season =

- Super League XVIII Rank: 9th
- Play-off result: Did not qualify
- Challenge Cup: 5th round
- 2013 record: Wins: 11; draws: 2; losses: 16
- Points scored: For: 726; against: 693

Team information
- Chairman: Omar Khan
- Head Coach: Francis Cummins
- Captain: Heath L'Estrange and Matt Diskin
- Stadium: Odsal Stadium
- Avg. attendance: 8,563
- High attendance: 12,016 vs. Leeds Rhinos

Top scorers
- Tries: Jarrod Sammut (25)
- Goals: Jamie Foster (69)
- Points: Jarrod Sammut (167)
← 2012	List of seasons	2014 →

This article details the Bradford Bulls rugby league football club's 2013 season, the 18th season of the Super League era.

== Season review ==
August 2012

It was announced that academy product Tom Burgess would be joining his brothers (Luke Burgess, Sam Burgess and twin brother George Burgess) at NRL side South Sydney Rabbitohs on a two-year deal. Meanwhile, young halfback Kyle Briggs announced he had signed for former club Featherstone Rovers on a two-year deal. Kyle had spent the entire 2012 season on loan at Featherstone.

September 2012

September was a positive month in terms of off-field problems as local businessman Omar Khan agreed to purchase the Bulls for £150,000 with an additional £100,000 to be paid in 2015. This move took the Bulls out of administration however their Super League status is still in jeopardy and must go through a mini-licensing process against Championship clubs Halifax, Leigh Centurions and Featherstone Rovers. Ben Jeffries announced that he was returning home to Australia at the end of the season to become a miner and play part-time for the Kurri Kurri Bulldogs. Veteran second-rower Ian Sibbit announces that he will retire from rugby at the end of the season. Second rower Olivier Elima signs a 2 Year Deal with his former club Catalans Dragons as he wishes to live in his home country and send his children to a French school. Fullback Brett Kearney scooped up Player of the Year at the awards evening. However Prop Bryn Hargreaves announced his retirement to take up a degree at university. Australian coach Mick Potter announces that he will return home to his native land after working without pay at the Bulls. Good news soon followed though as the Rugby Football League (RFL) released a statement providing the Bulls with a 1-year probationary licence which means the Bulls will have to face a review at the end of the 2013 season. Francis Cummins was announced as the head coach and signs a 3 Year Deal for the job. Winger and academy product Jason Crookes Finally made his move to Hull F.C. on a 3 Year Deal after months of rumours. Utility player Chev Walker signed a 1-year extension to his contract with the Bulls. It was announced at the annual awards evening that Mick Potter won Coach of the Year for his efforts at Bradford during a hard 2012 season.

October 2012

Paul Sykes signs a 1 Year Deal with Wakefield Trinity Wildcats after spending most of the 2012 season on loan at the West Yorkshire club. After much rumour and speculation Bradford born youngster John Bateman signs an improved 3 Year Extension with the Bulls keeping him at Odsal until 2015. Leeds based Hunslet Hawks announce the signing of Bulls academy product Callum Windley on a 1 Year Deal after he was released due to the U20's being scrapped and replaced by the U23's and U19's competitions. Coach Francis Cummins released winger Karl Pryce, prop Phil Joseph and also youngster Alex Ball. Bradford's first signing of the new season came in the form of Warrington Wolves centre Matty Blythe on a 1 Year Loan Deal after Francis Cummins was heavily recommended to Blythe by Wolves coach Tony Smith. Young fullback Curtis Naughton (3 Year Deal), centre Sam Wood (2 Year Deal) and second rower Oliver Roberts (3 Year Deal) were all give professional contracts and promoted to the first team. Halfback Luke Gale signs a 3 Year extension to his contract keeping him at Bradford until 2015. Tongan prop Manase Manuokafoa signed a 2 Year Extension to his contract. October kept on being productive with the announcement that Maltese halfback Jarrod Sammut signed a 2 Year Extension with the club subject to acquiring a working visa. Academy product Danny Addy also signed a 1 Year Extension to his contract. It was announced that popular winger Shaun Ainscough would leave the Bulls after being offered less money to play, he will join the South City Bulls in New South Wales, Australia. Meanwhile, Rajas (a fast food chain) becomes the first major sponsorship by an Asian businessman in the club's history. Bradford announced that they had signed a 4-year deal with kit maker ISC who supply 7 other Super League teams with kits, this brings an end to a 5-year deal with Kooga.

November 2012

The Bulls announce their 2nd capture of the season, Warrington Wolves prop Ben Evans on a 1 Year loan deal, he is the twin brother of Wolves centre Rhys Evans. Bradford also signed St. Helens youngster Jamie Foster on a 1 Year permanent deal. On the 9th Bradford announced a record breaking sponsorship with loan firm Provident Financial, this sponsorship will be worth £1.2 million over a period of 4 years making it the biggest ever sponsorship in the Super League history, on the same day the Bulls also previewed the 2013 home shirt. Young loose-forward James Donaldson signed a 1-year extension to his contract. A couple of days before the fixtures were due to be released clubs were allowed to tweet their first home and away game of the season, Bradford announced they will kick off the 2013 season at home against Wakefield Trinity Wildcats with their second game at the KC Stadium to play Hull FC. The squad numbers were released and youngster John Bateman was handed the number 11 shirt from Olivier Elima whilst Jarrod Sammut will wear the number 6 jersey.

December 2012

The month was relatively uneventful for the Bulls, aside from the announcement that Salford City Reds prop Adam Sidlow had signed a two-year contract with Bradford and would wear the number 27 for the 2013 season.

January 2013

On loan prop Ben Evans had to have surgery on his shoulder and he was out for four months. Also former player Ian Sibbit returned to be a part of coach Francis Cummins's backroom staff. Bradford's first pre-season game saw them beat local team Dewsbury Rams 48-6; Elliott Whitehead was the star of the game, scoring 4 tries. Heath L'Estrange, Matty Blythe, Matt Diskin and Manase Manuokafoa also scored tries whilst Jamie Foster enjoyed a good performance with the boot kicking all 8 goals. The week after businesswoman of the year Kate Hardcastle joined the Bulls in a non-executive role. In their final pre-season game the Bulls drew 24–24 with Leeds Rhinos for Danny McGuire's testimonial, Jarrod Sammut and Brett Kearney both scored 2 tries each and Jamie Foster kicked 4 goals. Bradford also showed off their new purple, white and green away kit for 2013.

February 2013

The Bulls announced that their entire squad barring Matty Blythe and Ben Evans (who are on loan) have been dual registered with Dewsbury Rams; this means that anybody who doesn't get into Bradford's game day squad is available to play for the Rams. Bradford kicked off 2013 with a 40–6 win over Wakefield Trinity Wildcats; Michael Platt opened the scoring and then Matty Blythe and Adam Sidlow both scored on debut. Jarrod Sammut then grabbed a brace of tries whilst Jamie Foster and Brett Kearney also crossed to score, Foster added 6 goals to ensure the Bulls started with a win. That same weekend James Donaldson and Adam O'Brien featured for Dewsbury Rams under the dual registration and O'Brien scored 2 tries to help the Rams to an opening round victory. Bradford were due to play Hull F.C. away on 8 February but due to an accident on the M62 the game was postponed until the 10th. The Bulls were poor against a strong Hull side but Matty Blythe and Brett Kearney both managed to score in the 28–12 loss with Jamie Foster also kicking 2 goals. Bradford got back to winning ways as a Brett Kearney hat-trick helped them to a 38–12 win over Castleford Tigers. Adam Sidlow, Matty Blythe and Chev Walker also scored tries and Jamie Foster slotted over 7 goals. February finished on a sour note as the Bulls went down 36–10 to St Helens R.F.C., the Bulls were never at the races but managed to grab two late tries from Brett Kearney and Elliot Kear with former Saints player Jamie Foster kicking a goal.

March 2013

The Bulls soon got back to winning ways as they bounced back and hammered Huddersfield Giants 43-18. Jarrod Sammut had a hat-trick whilst Matty Blythe, Danny Addy, Brett Kearney and Adam O'Brien (his first Super League try) all crossed to score. Jamie Foster kicked 7 goals and Sammut slotted over a drop goal to ensure the points came to Bradford. The Bulls backed this great performance with a 22–22 draw against Widnes Vikings. Gareth Hock was sent off before halftime when the Bulls were 20–4 in front however the 12 man Widnes side fought back an appalling 2nd half Bradford to claim a point of the Bulls. Bradford's tries came from Jamie Langley, Brett Kearney, Matt Diskin and Keith Lulia whilst Jarrod Sammut kicked 3 goals. The Bulls depleted side beat a travelling Hull Kingston Rovers side 34–12 with Jamie Foster, Brett Kearney, Elliot Kear, John Bateman and Jarrod Sammut (2 tries) all scoring, Jamie Foster kicked 5 goals to ensure that the Bulls took the points. Australian centre Adrian Purtell made his comeback after suffering a heart attack against Leeds Rhinos last season. The Bulls lost away to Catalans Dragons for the second year running as Elliot Kear and John Bateman's tries weren't enough to stop the French side beating Bradford 30-10, Jamie Foster also kicked a goal. Bradford finished March with an 18–18 draw against arch rivals Leeds Rhinos, Adrian Purtell and Tom Olbison gave the Bulls a 12–12 halftime score. However Leeds fought back to lead 18–12 but a late Adam Sidlow try helped secure a point for the Bulls.

April 2013

The Bulls started April with an average performance as they beat Salford City Reds 36-24, John Bateman, Adrian Purtell, Brett Kearney and Jamie Langley all scored a try each and Jarrod Sammut scored a double. Jamie Foster added 4 goals before going off injured and Sammut added a further 2 goals. Bradford continued their impressive run of form with a 46–20 win against London Broncos. Jarrod Sammut was once again the star of the game as he ran in four second half tries and landed 6 goals to keep the Bulls in 3rd place, Elliott Whitehead also crossed for 2 tries with Danny Addy and Chev Walker each grabbing a try. Bradford were brought back down to earth with a dismal first half performance which led to a 36–6 defeat at the hands of Wigan Warriors, all six points came from Jarrod Sammut. Bradford started their Challenge Cup run with a 70–10 thrashing of lower league Rochdale Hornets. Sam Wood scored a try on his debut whilst Luke Gale and Jarrod Sammut scored 2 each. Elliott Whitehead grabbed himself a hat-trick while Jamie Langley, Chev Walker, John Bateman and Michael Platt also crossed for a try each, Jamie Foster added 2 goals before going off injured and Sammut booted a further 9 goals. They finished the month with a 32–4 loss to Warrington Wolves with the Bulls only points coming from an Adrian Purtell try.

May 2013

The Bulls had a disappointing start to May as they were well beaten at home (42-22) by arch-rivals Leeds Rhinos, on loan Ben Evans opened the scoring for Bradford as he crossed for his 1st try for the Bulls. Further tries were added by Brett Kearney and a double from Elliot Kear, Jarrod Sammut also kicked 3 goals in Jamie Foster's absence. Bradford's season got worse as they were beaten 25–16 in the 5th round of the Challenge Cup by London Broncos. Jarrod Sammut, Nick Scruton and Elliot Kear scored for the Bulls as they were knocked out of the cup with Sammut also kicking 2 goals. Young winger Jamie Foster re-signed with the Bulls for a further 2 years. Due to an injury crisis in the pack Francis Cummins brought in Jacob Fairbank from Huddersfield Giants on a one-month loan. The Bulls overcame this defeat by beating struggling Salford City Reds 28-7 with Matty Blythe scoring 2 tries with Luke Gale, Adrian Purtell and Matt Diskin also scoring tries. Sammut added 4 goals to give the Bulls a much needed win. The last game of May saw the Bulls face Huddersfield Giants at the Magic Weekend, Bradford had an injury hit side and were out-muscled by a large Giants pack who won the game 42–6 with Jamie Foster scoring the Bulls only points.

June 2013

June started off bad for the Bulls as they lost 28–18 to playoff rivals Hull Kingston Rovers. Jarrod Sammut, Keith Lulia and Michael Platt all scored a try with Sammut kicking 2 goals and Luke Gale kicking another, however Hull KR won the game in the last 10–15 minutes with 2 breakaway tries. This defeat was followed up by the news that young second-row Tom Olbison had signed a new 2-year deal at the club keeping him until 2015, however the good news was short lived after it was announced that homegrown second-row Elliott Whitehead had handed in a transfer request as he wishes to play at a top 4 side. Coach Francis Cummins stated at the time that Whitehead has been put on indefinite leave and will play no further part in the Bulls season. The Bulls then faced an out of form St Helens R.F.C. side, however Cummins men were not up to the task and lost 30–18 with Brett Kearney, Matty Blythe and Elliot Kear scoring for the Bulls. Gale also kicked 3 goals in the defeat. One of the positive points in that game is that young second-rower Oliver Roberts was handed his debut off the bench. News surrounding the club increased in the lead up to Bradford's first home game in over a month. The first bit of news was that veteran second-rower Chev Walker had signed a new 1-year deal with an option of another. Then it was announced that the Bulls had signed Warrington Wolves and England RL prop Gareth Carvell had signed with the Bulls on a 2 Year Deal which will add a bit of size to the relatively small Bradford pack. However bad news was soon to follow as Keith Lulia is set to go back home to Australia at the end of the year and youngster Danny Addy has rejected a new deal that was offered to him. French based Catalans Dragons announced that they had signed Elliott Whitehead on a 2 1/2-year deal. It was also announced that hooker and captain Matt Diskin signed a 1 Year Extension to his contract. Bradford also revealed that legend and fan favourite Robbie Paul would be returning to the club as deputy director. Bradford finished the month with a 26–12 loss to Warrington Wolves the Bulls scored late tries through Walker and Donaldson but it wasn't enough to come back and beat the Wolves.

July 2013

The month started off with some good news as Huddersfield Giants second-row Dale Ferguson was announced as the Bulls 2nd new signing for the 2014 season. Ferguson was signed on a 2 Year Deal after other clubs such as Hull Kingston Rovers had also offered deals. In addition to this it was also announced that prop Manase Manuokafoa had signed a 2 Year Extension to his contract. Bradford travelled to Wigan Warriors where they suffered a 26–20 defeat after letting go of an 18–4 lead, the Bulls scored through Michael Platt, Adam Sidlow and John Bateman while Jamie Foster added 4 goals. Bradford managed to beat Hull F.C. 19-12 to get back on the road to the playoffs. The Bulls tries came from Jarrod Sammut, Elliot Kear and Matt Diskin whilst Jamie Foster kicked 3 goals and Luke Gale slotted a drop goal. Recruitment for the 2014 season continued as the Bulls announced that they had signed Luke George on a 2 Year Deal from Huddersfield Giants.

August 2013

It was announced that loan signing Matty Blythe had signed a permanent 3 Year Deal with the Bulls from Warrington Wolves. Bradford's push for the playoffs received a huge boost as they beat Wakefield Trinity Wildcats 26-24 with Keith Lulia scoring 2 tries, Brett Kearney, Tom Olbison and Jamie Foster all scored a try each too while Foster kicked 3 goals. The following week saw the Bulls lose 23–22 to Catalans Dragons. Lulia once again scored 2 tries with Kearney adding another, Adrian Purtell also crossed for a try while Foster kicked 3 goals. The game was lost in controversial fashion as Kearney was sin-binned with 7 minutes to go for a professional foul on Elliott Whitehead and Ian Henderson crossed the try line to draw before Thomas Bosc slotted the decisive drop goal to win. Bradford's playoff hopes were ended as they lost 46–34 to Castleford Tigers, Jarrod Sammut scored 2 tries whilst Brett Kearney, Nick Scruton, Elliot Kear and Danny Addy also scored tries. Jamie Foster added 5 goals but it wasn't enough and the Bulls were out of the playoffs for the 5th year in a row. Some positive news followed as youngster James Donaldson re-signed with the Bulls for another year. Danny Addy also signed a 2 Year Extension with the Bulls. The Bulls announced that they had signed young Stand Off Lee Gaskell on a 2 Year Deal from St. Helens.

September 2013

After all the good news off the pitch that August brought there was bad news on the pitch in September. The Bulls puck in a lackluster performance against London Broncos and lost 20–10, Keith Lulia and Danny Addy scored for the Bulls while Jamie Foster kicked a goal. The Bulls finished the season with a 58–6 win against a young Huddersfield Giants side. Jarrod Sammut grabbed 4 tries whilst Lulia signed off with a hat-trick. Danny Addy, Jamie Foster and Elliot Kear also scored tries, Jamie Foster kicked 9 goals.

== 2013 milestones ==
- Round 1: Matty Blythe, Jamie Foster and Adam Sidlow all made their debuts for the Bulls.
- Round 1: Matty Blythe, Jamie Foster and Adam Sidlow scored their 1st tries for the Bulls.
- Round 1: Jamie Foster kicked his 1st goal for the Bulls.
- Round 3: Jobe Murphy made his debut for the Bulls.
- Round 3: Brett Kearney scored his 2nd hat-trick for the Bulls.
- Round 5: Jarrod Sammut scored his 2nd hat-trick for the Bulls.
- Round 5: Jarrod Sammut kicked his 1st drop goal for the Bulls.
- Round 5: Adam O'Brien scored his 1st try for the Bulls.
- Round 6: Matt Diskin made his 50th appearance for the Bulls.
- Round 6: Jarrod Sammut reached 100 points for the Bulls.
- Round 9: Danny Addy made his 50th appearance for the Bulls.
- Round 10: Elliott Whitehead made his 100th appearance for the Bulls.
- Round 11: Jarrod Sammut scored his 2nd four-try haul and 3rd hat-trick for the Bulls.
- CCR4: Sam Wood and Ben Evans make their debuts for the Bulls.
- CCR4: Sam Wood scored his 1st try for the Bulls.
- CCR4: Elliott Whitehead scored his 4th hat-trick for the Bulls.
- Round 14: Tom Olbison made his 50th appearance for the Bulls.
- Round 14: Ben Evans scored his 1st try for the Bulls.
- Round 15: Jacob Fairbank made his debut for the Bulls.
- Round 15: Jarrod Sammut reached 200 points for the Bulls.
- Round 17: Jamie Langley made his 250th appearance for the Bulls.
- Round 18: Oliver Roberts made his debut for the Bulls.
- Round 20: Alex Mellor made his debut for the Bulls.
- Round 21: Jamie Foster reached 100 points for the Bulls.
- Round 22: Jarrod Sammut scored his 25th try for the Bulls.
- Round 23: Keith Lulia and James Donaldson make their 50th appearances for the Bulls.
- Round 24: Brett Kearney scored his 50th try and reached 200 points for the Bulls.
- Round 25: Chev Walker made his 50th appearance for the Bulls.
- Round 27: Curtis Naughton and Nathan Conroy made their debuts for the Bulls.
- Round 27: Jarrod Sammut scored his 3rd four-try haul and 4th hat-trick for the Bulls.
- Round 27: Keith Lulia scored his 1st hat-trick for the Bulls.

== Pre-season friendlies ==
LEGEND
Win
Draw
Loss

Bulls score is first.

Date	Competition	Vrs	H/A	Venue	Result	Score	Tries	Goals	Att	Report
13 January 2013	Pre Season	Dewsbury Rams	A	Rams Stadium	W	48-6	Whitehead (4), L'Estrange, Blythe, Diskin, Manuokafoa	Foster 8/8	1,531	Report
20 January 2013	Pre Season	Leeds Rhinos	A	Headingley Stadium	D	24-24	Sammut (2), Kearney (2)	Foster 4/4	6,106	Report

== Player appearances ==
- Friendly games only

FB=Fullback	C=Centre	W=Winger	SO=Stand Off	SH=Scrum half	P=Prop	H=Hooker	SR=Second row	LF=Loose forward	B=Bench

No	Player	1	2
1	Brett Kearney		SO
2	Adrian Purtell		
3	Keith Lulia	C	C
4	Matty Blythe	C	C
5	Elliot Kear	W	W
6	Jarrod Sammut	SO	SH
7	Luke Gale		
8	Nick Scruton	P	P
9	Heath L'Estrange	H	
10	Manase Manuokafoa	P	P
11	John Bateman		
12	Elliott Whitehead	SR	SR
13	Jamie Langley		
14	Matt Diskin	B	H
15	Chev Walker	L	L
16	Tom Olbison	SR	SR
17	Jamie Foster	FB	FB
18	Michael Platt	W	W
19	Danny Addy	SH	B
20	Adam O'Brien	B	B
21	James Donaldson		B
22	Jobe Murphy	B	B
23	Ben Evans		
24	Oliver Roberts		
25	Sam Wood	B	x
26	Curtis Naughton	B	x
27	Adam Sidlow	B	B

= Injured

= Suspended

== Table ==
Super League XVIII
Pos	Team	Pld	W	D	L	PF	PA	PD	Pts	Qualification
1	Huddersfield Giants (L)	27	21	0	6	851	507	+344	42	Play-offs
2	Warrington Wolves	27	20	1	6	836	461	+375	41	Play-offs
3	Leeds Rhinos	27	18	1	8	712	507	+205	37	Play-offs
4	Wigan Warriors (C)	27	17	1	9	816	460	+356	35	Play-offs
5	St. Helens	27	15	1	11	678	536	+142	31	Play-offs
6	Hull F.C.	27	13	2	12	652	563	+89	28	Play-offs
7	Catalans Dragons	27	13	2	12	619	604	+15	28	Play-offs
8	Hull Kingston Rovers	27	13	0	14	642	760	−118	26	Play-offs
9	Bradford Bulls	27	10	2	15	640	658	−18	22	
10	Widnes Vikings	27	10	2	15	695	841	−146	22	
11	Wakefield Trinity Wildcats	27	10	1	16	660	749	−89	21	
12	Castleford Tigers	27	9	2	16	702	881	−179	20	
13	London Broncos	27	5	2	20	487	946	−459	12	
14	Salford City Reds	27	6	1	20	436	953	−517	11 (Note: Salford deducted 2 points on 14 June 2013 for fielding 14 players during home game against Castleford)	

Source: superleague.co.uk and BBC Sport
Rules for classification: 1st on competition points; 2nd on match points difference. Competition points: for win = 2; for draw = 1; for loss = 0.
(C) Champions; (L) League Leaders' Shield Winners

== 2013 fixtures and results ==
LEGEND
Win
Draw
Loss

2013 Engage Super League

Date	Competition	Rnd	Vrs	H/A	Venue	Result	Score	Tries	Goals	Att	Live on TV	Report
3 February 2013	Super League XVIII	1	Wakefield Trinity Wildcats	H	Odsal Stadium	W	40-6	Sammut (2), Blythe, Foster, Kearney, Platt, Sidlow	Foster 6/7	10,263	-	Report
10 February 2013	Super League XVIII	2	Hull F.C.	A	KC Stadium	L	12-28	Blythe, Kearney	Foster 2/2	10,952	-	Report
16 February 2013	Super League XVIII	3	Castleford Tigers	H	Odsal Stadium	W	38-12	Kearney (3), Blythe, Sidlow, Walker	Foster 7/7	7,724	Sky Sports	Report
23 February 2013	Super League XVIII	4	St. Helens	H	Odsal Stadium	L	10-36	Kear, Kearney	Foster 1/2	8,203	-	Report
3 March 2013	Super League XVIII	5	Huddersfield Giants	A	Galpharm Stadium	W	43-18	Sammut (3), Addy, Blythe, Kearney, O'Brien	Foster 7/7, Sammut 1 DG	7,616	-	Report
8 March 2013	Super League XVIII	6	Widnes Vikings	A	Halton Stadium	D	22-22	Diskin, Kearney, Lulia, Whitehead	Sammut 3/5	5,861	-	Report
17 March 2013	Super League XVIII	7	Hull Kingston Rovers	H	Odsal Stadium	W	34-12	Sammut (2), Bateman, Foster, Kear, Kearney	Foster 5/7	7,843	-	Report
23 March 2013	Super League XVIII	8	Catalans Dragons	A	Stade Gilbert Brutus	L	10-30	Bateman, Kear	Foster 1/2	6,813	Sky Sports	Report
28 March 2013	Super League XVIII	9	Leeds Rhinos	A	Headingley Stadium	D	18-18	Olbison, Purtell, Sidlow	Foster 3/3	16,604	Sky Sports	Report
1 April 2013	Super League XVIII	10	Salford City Reds	H	Odsal Stadium	W	36-24	Sammut (2), Bateman, Kearney, Langley, Purtell	Foster 4/4, Sammut 2/3	7,503	-	Report
6 April 2013	Super League XVIII	11	London Broncos	A	Twickenham Stoop	W	46-20	Sammut (4), Whitehead (2), Addy, Walker	Sammut 7/8	1,441	-	Report
14 April 2013	Super League XVIII	12	Wigan Warriors	H	Odsal Stadium	L	6-36	Sammut	Sammut 1/1	9,899	-	Report
28 April 2013	Super League XVIII	13	Warrington Wolves	A	Halliwell Jones Stadium	L	4-32	Purtell	Gale 0/1	10,901	-	Report
3 May 2013	Super League XVIII	14	Leeds Rhinos	H	Odsal Stadium	L	22-42	Kear (2), Evans, Kearney	Sammut 3/4	12,016	Sky Sports	Report
17 May 2013	Super League XVIII	15	Salford City Reds	A	City of Salford Stadium	W	28-7	Blythe (2), Diskin, Gale, Purtell	Sammut 4/5	5,106	-	Report
25 May 2013	Magic Weekend	16	Huddersfield Giants	N	Etihad Stadium	L	6-42	Foster	Foster 1/1	31,249	Sky Sports	Report
2 June 2013	Super League XVIII	17	Hull Kingston Rovers	A	Craven Park	L	18-28	Lulia, Platt, Sammut	Sammut 2/2, Gale 1/1, Addy 0/1	7,259	-	Report
7 June 2013	Super League XVIII	18	St. Helens	A	Langtree Park	L	18-30	Blythe, Kear, Kearney	Gale 3/3	11,385	-	Report
23 June 2013	Super League XVIII	19	Widnes Vikings	H	Odsal Stadium	L	28-32	Donaldson, Kear, Lulia, Platt, Sidlow	Gale 4/5	8,124	-	Report
30 June 2013	Super League XVIII	20	Warrington Wolves	H	Odsal Stadium	L	12-26	Donaldson, Walker	Foster 2/2	8,485	-	Report
5 July 2013	Super League XVIII	21	Wigan Warriors	A	DW Stadium	L	20-26	Bateman, Platt, Sidlow	Foster 4/5	13,213	-	Report
19 July 2013	Super League XVIII	22	Hull F.C.	H	Odsal Stadium	W	19-12	Diskin, Kear, Sammut	Foster 3/3, Gale 1 DG	7,914	Sky Sports	Report
4 August 2013	Super League XVIII	23	Wakefield Trinity Wildcats	A	Belle Vue	W	26-24	Lulia (2), Foster, Kearney, Olbison	Foster 3/5	8,084	-	Report
11 August 2013	Super League XVIII	24	Catalans Dragons	H	Odsal Stadium	L	22-23	Lulia (2), Kearney, Purtell	Foster 3/4	7,850	-	Report
18 August 2013	Super League XVIII	25	Castleford Tigers	A	The Jungle	L	34-46	Sammut (2), Addy, Kear, Kearney, Scruton	Foster 5/6	6,633	-	Report
1 September 2013	Super League XVIII	26	London Broncos	H	Odsal Stadium	L	10-20	Addy, Lulia	Foster 1/2	7,148	-	Report
8 September 2013	Super League XVIII	27	Huddersfield Giants	H	Odsal Stadium	W	58-6	Sammut (4), Lulia (3), Addy, Foster, Kear	Foster 9/10	8,348	Sky Sports	Report

== Player appearances ==
- Super League only

FB=Fullback	C=Centre	W=Winger	SO=Stand-off	SH=Scrum half	PR=Prop	H=Hooker	SR=Second row	L=Loose forward	B=Bench

No	Player	1	2	3	4	5	6	7	8	9	10	11	12	13	14	15	16	17	18	19	20	21	22	23	24	25	26	27
1	Brett Kearney	SO	SO	FB	FB	FB	FB	FB	FB	FB	FB	FB	FB	FB	FB			FB	FB	FB			FB	FB	FB	FB		
2	Adrian Purtell							B	C	C	C	W	C	C	W	C	W			C	C	C	C	C	C	C		
3	Keith Lulia	C	C	C	C	C	C	C		C	C	C	C	C	C	C	C	C	C	C	C		C	C	C	C	C	C
4	Matty Blythe	C	C	C	C	C	C								C	SR	C	C	C	SR	SR	SR				SR		
5	Elliot Kear	W	W	W	W	W	W	W	W	W	W	W	W	W	W	W	W	W	W	W	W	W	W	W	W	W	W	W
6	Jarrod Sammut	SH	SH	SO	SO	SO	SO	SO	SO	SO	SO	SO	SO	SO	SO	FB	SO	SO					B	SO	B	SO	SO	SO
7	Luke Gale											B	B	SH	SH	SH		SH	SH	SH		SH	SH	SH	SH		SH	SH
8	Nick Scruton	P	P	P	P	P	P	P	P	P	B	P	P	P	P	P	P	P	P	P	P	P	P	P	P	P	P	
9	Heath L'Estrange	B	B	B	B	H	H	H	H	B	H	B	B	H	B	H	H	H	H	B	SH	B	B	B	B			
10	Manase Manuokafoa	P	P	P	B	P	P	P	P	P	P	B	P	P	P					B	B	P	B	B	P	P	P	P
11	John Bateman							SR	SR	B	SR			SR		B		SR	SR	SR	SR	SR	SR					
12	Elliott Whitehead	SR	SR	SR	SR	SR	SR	C	C	SR	SR	C	SR	SR	SR	SR	SR	SR	x	x	x	x	x	x	x	x	x	x
13	Jamie Langley	B	B	B	B	B	L			B	P	B	B			P	P	P	P				L	SR	SR	B	SR	
14	Matt Diskin	H	H	H	H		B		B	H		H	H	B	H	B	B		B	H	H	H	H	H	H	H	H	H
15	Chev Walker	L	L	L	L	L	W		L	L		SR	SR	L	L	L	L	L			B		B	B	L	L	B	
16	Tom Olbison	SR	SR	SR	SR	SR	SR	SR	SR	SR	B	SR			SR		SR		SR	B			SR	SR	SR	SR	B	SR
17	Jamie Foster	FB	FB	W	W	W		W	W	W	W						FB				FB	FB	W	W	W	W	FB	W
18	Michael Platt	W	W										W	W	x	W	x	W	W	W	W	C					C	B
19	Danny Addy	B	B	SH	SH	SH	SH	SH	SH	SH	SH	SH	SH	B	B	SO	SH	B	SO	SO	SO	SO	SO	B	SO	SH	SR	SR
20	Adam O'Brien	x	x	x	x	B	x	B	x	x	B	x	x	x	x	x	x	B	x	x	x	x	x	x	x	B	B	B
21	James Donaldson				B	B	B	L	B		L	L	L				B		L	L	L	L		L	B	B	L	L
22	Jobe Murphy	x	x	B	x	x	B	B	B	x	x	x	x	x	x	x	x	x	x	x	x	x	x	x	x	x	x	x
23	Ben Evans	x	x	x	x	x	x	x	x	x	x	x	x	B	B	B	B	B	B	B	B	B	P	P	B	B	B	P
24	Oliver Roberts	x	x	x	x	x	x	x	x	x	x	x	x	x	x	x	x	x	B	x	x	B	x	x	x	x	x	x
25	Sam Wood	x	x	x	x	x	x	x	x	x	x	x	x	x	x	x	x	x	x	x	x	W	x	x	x	x	W	C
26	Curtis Naughton	x	x	x	x	x	x	x	x	x	x	x	x	x	x	x	x	x	x	x	x	x	x	x	x	x	x	FB
27	Adam Sidlow	B	B	B	P	B	B	B	B	B	B	P	B	B	B			B	B	P	P	B						
28	Jacob Fairbank	x	x	x	x	x	x	x	x	x	x	x	x	x	x	B	B					x	x	x	x	x	x	x
29	Alex Mellor	x	x	x	x	x	x	x	x	x	x	x	x	x	x	x	x	x	x	x	B	x	x	x	x	x	x	B
30	Nathan Conroy	x	x	x	x	x	x	x	x	x	x	x	x	x	x	x	x	x	x	x	x	x	x	x	x	x	x	B

= Injured

= Suspended

== Challenge Cup ==
LEGEND
Win
Draw
Loss

Date	Competition	Rnd	Vrs	H/A	Venue	Result	Score	Tries	Goals	Att	TV	Report
21 April 2013	Cup	4th	Rochdale Hornets	A	Spotland Stadium	W	70-10	Whitehead (3), Gale (2), Sammut (2), Bateman, Langley, Platt, Walker, Wood	Sammut 9/10, Foster 2/2	1,722	-	Report
10 May 2013	Cup	5th	London Broncos	A	Twickenham Stoop	L	16-25	Kear, Sammut, Scruton	Sammut 2/3	1,237	-	Report

== Player appearances ==
- Challenge Cup games only

FB=Fullback	C=Centre	W=Winger	SO=Stand Off	SH=Scrum half	P=Prop	H=Hooker	SR=Second row	L=Loose forward	B=Bench

No	Player	4	5
1	Brett Kearney	x	FB
2	Adrian Purtell	C	W
3	Keith Lulia	C	C
4	Matty Blythe		C
5	Elliot Kear	x	W
6	Jarrod Sammut	SO	SO
7	Luke Gale	SH	SH
8	Nick Scruton	x	P
9	Heath L'Estrange	H	H
10	Manase Manuokafoa	P	
11	John Bateman	B	B
12	Elliott Whitehead	SR	SR
13	Jamie Langley	P	
14	Matt Diskin	x	B
15	Chev Walker	L	P
16	Tom Olbison		
17	Jamie Foster	FB	
18	Michael Platt	W	x
19	Danny Addy	SR	SR
20	Adam O'Brien	B	x
21	James Donaldson		L
22	Jobe Murphy	x	x
23	Ben Evans	B	B
24	Oliver Roberts	x	x
25	Sam Wood	W	x
26	Curtis Naughton	x	x
27	Adam Sidlow	B	B

== 2013 squad statistics ==
- Appearances and points include (Super League, Challenge Cup and play-offs) as of 8 September 2013.

No	Player	Position	Age	Previous club	Apps	Tries	Goals	DG	Points
1	Brett Kearney	Fullback	29	Cronulla Sharks	22	15	0	0	60
2	Adrian Purtell	Wing	28	Penrith Panthers	19	5	0	0	20
3	Keith Lulia	Centre	25	Newcastle Knights	27	11	0	0	44
4	Matty Blythe	Centre	24	Warrington Wolves - Loan	16	7	0	0	28
5	Elliot Kear	Wing	24	Crusaders	28	11	0	0	44
6	Jarrod Sammut	Stand off	26	Crusaders	25	25	33	1	167
7	Luke Gale	Scrum half	24	Harlequins RL	16	3	8	1	29
8	Nick Scruton	Prop	28	Leeds Rhinos	27	2	0	0	8
9	Heath L'Estrange	Hooker	27	Manly Sea Eagles	26	0	0	0	0
10	Manase Manuokafoa	Prop	27	Parramatta Eels	24	0	0	0	0
11	John Bateman	Second row	19	Bradford Bulls Academy	14	5	0	0	20
12	Elliott Whitehead	Second row	23	Bradford Bulls Academy	19	6	0	0	24
13	Jamie Langley	Loose forward	29	Bradford Bulls Academy	20	2	0	0	8
14	Matt Diskin	Hooker	31	Leeds Rhinos	24	3	0	0	12
15	Chev Walker	Second row	30	Hull Kingston Rovers	23	4	0	0	16
16	Tom Olbison	Second row	22	Bradford Bulls Academy	21	2	0	0	8
17	Jamie Foster	Wing	22	St Helens R.F.C.	19	5	69	0	158
18	Michael Platt	Centre	28	Castleford Tigers	13	5	0	0	20
19	Danny Addy	Loose forward	22	Bradford Bulls Academy	29	5	0	0	20
20	Adam O'Brien	Hooker	19	Bradford Bulls Academy	8	1	0	0	4
21	James Donaldson	Loose forward	21	Bradford Bulls Academy	19	2	0	0	8
22	Jobe Murphy	Second row	20	Bradford Bulls Academy	4	0	0	0	0
23	Ben Evans	Prop	20	Warrington Wolves - Loan	17	1	0	0	4
24	Oliver Roberts	Second row	18	Bradford Bulls Academy	2	0	0	0	0
25	Sam Wood	Centre	19	Bradford Bulls Academy	4	1	0	0	4
26	Curtis Naughton	Fullback	18	Bradford Bulls Academy	1	0	0	0	0
27	Adam Sidlow	Prop	25	Salford City Reds	21	5	0	0	20
28	Jacob Fairbank	Prop	23	Huddersfield Giants - Loan	2	0	0	0	0
29	Alex Mellor	Second row	18	Bradford Bulls Academy	2	0	0	0	0
30	Nathan Conroy	Hooker	18	Bradford Bulls Academy	1	0	0	0	0

= Injured = Suspended

== 2013 transfers in/out ==
In

	Name	Position	Signed from	Date
(England)	Matty Blythe (Loan)	Centre	Warrington Wolves	October 2012
(Wales)	Ben Evans (Loan)	Prop	Warrington Wolves	November 2012
(England)	Jamie Foster	Wing	St Helens R.F.C.	November 2012
(England)	Adam Sidlow	Prop	Salford City Reds	December 2012
(England)	Jacob Fairbank (Loan)	Prop	Huddersfield Giants	May 2013

Out

	Name	Position	Club Signed	Date
(England)	Tom Burgess	Prop	South Sydney Rabbitohs	August 2012
(England)	Kyle Briggs	Stand off	Featherstone Rovers	August 2012
(Australia)	Ben Jeffries	Stand off	Retirement	September 2012
(England)	Ian Sibbit	Second row	Retirement	September 2012
(France)	Olivier Elima	Second row	Catalans Dragons	September 2012
(England)	Bryn Hargreaves	Prop	Retirement	September 2012
(England)	Jason Crookes	Wing	Hull F.C.	September 2012
(Wales)	Craig Kopczak	Prop	Huddersfield Giants	September 2012
(England)	Paul Sykes	Stand off	Wakefield Trinity Wildcats	October 2012
(England)	Callum Windley	Hooker	Hunslet Hawks	October 2012
(England)	Karl Pryce	Wing	Released	October 2012
(England)	Phil Joseph	Prop	Released	October 2012
(England)	Alex Ball	Prop	Released	October 2012
(England)	Shaun Ainscough	Wing	Australia	October 2012
(England)	Liam McAvoy	Prop	Leeds Rhinos	November 2012
(England)	Cain Southernwood	Scrum half	Whitehaven	November 2012
(England)	Jobe Murphy	Second row	Dewsbury Rams	May 2013
(England)	Elliott Whitehead	Second row	Catalans Dragons	June 2013
