= Adrian Purtell =

Australian rugby league footballer

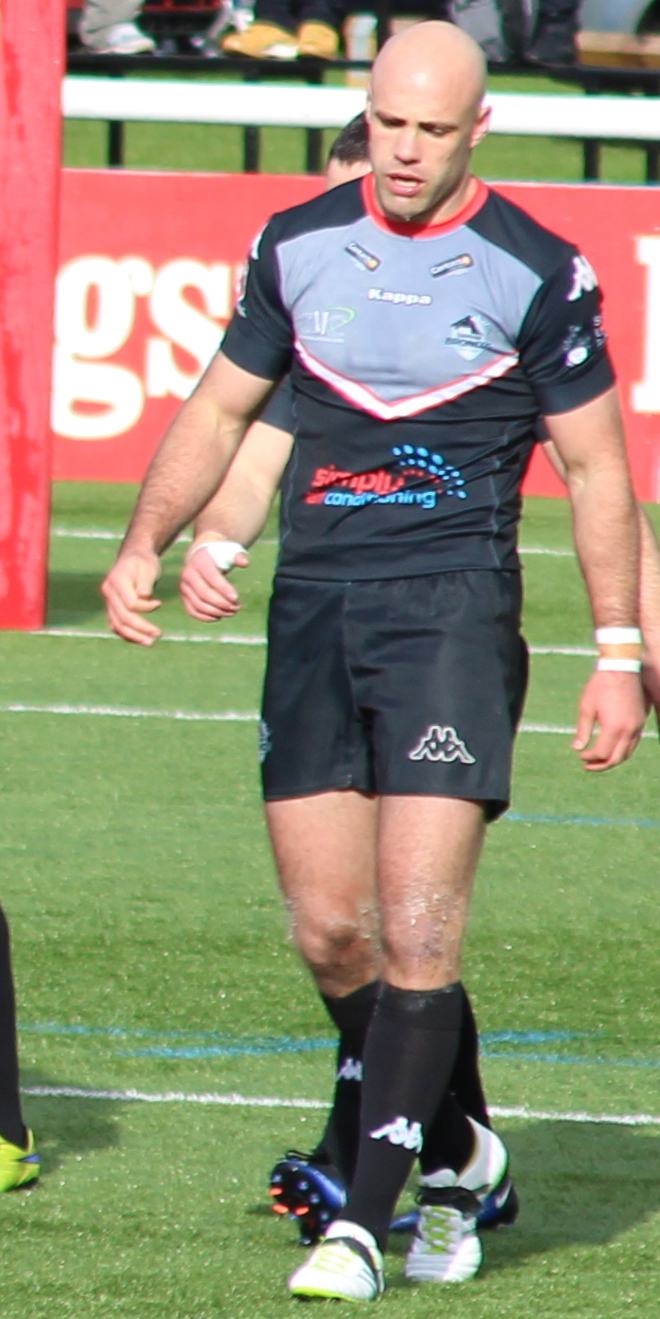

Personal information
- Born: 31 January 1985 (age 41) Albury, New South Wales, Australia
- Height: 6 ft 4 in (1.93 m)
- Weight: 15 st 8 lb (99 kg)

Playing information
- Position: Centre, Wing
Club
Years	Team	Pld	T	G	FG	P
2006–09	Canberra Raiders	64	30	0	0	120
2010–11	Penrith Panthers	46	15	0	0	60
2012–16	Bradford Bulls	88	38	0	0	152
2017	London Broncos	10	2	0	0	8
2018-	Albury Thunder
	Total	208	85	0	0	340
- Source: As of 23 September 2017

Adrian Purtell (born 31 January 1985) is an Australian former professional rugby league footballer who plays for the Albury Thunder.

He previously played for the Canberra Raiders, Penrith Panthers, Bradford Bulls and the London Broncos. His usual position is as a centre.

== Career ==
=== Early career ===
Purtell played junior rugby league with Albury Rams and Lavington Panthers.

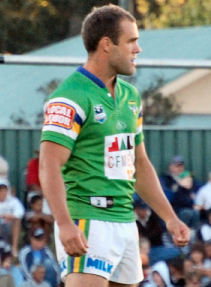
Purtell playing for the Canberra Raiders

=== Canberra Raiders ===
He made his début for the Canberra Raiders in round 1 2006 against the Manly-Warringah Sea Eagles. In 2006, he was crowned the club's Rookie of the Year. During the season, he also re-signed with the club until the end of 2008.

In round 6 of the 2007 NRL season, Purtell was shifted from the wing to the centres. Purtell took this opportunity with both hands, scoring two tries in his first match in the new position and showing consistent form after that match.

Purtell was diagnosed with deep vein thrombosis in the middle of 2007. He missed the rest of the season as a result. This came at a cruel time for Purtell as he had only just cemented a spot in the centres. In his last game of 2007, he scored 3 tries against the St George Illawarra Dragons, including a 90-metre solo effort.

After a long recovery Purtell made a successful return to rugby league. On 16 March 2008, Purtell completed his return by crossing over for 2 tries against the Newcastle Knights. Soon after he re-signed to stay with Canberra until the end of the 2011 season, rejecting an offer to join the Melbourne Storm. He ended the 2008 NRL season as top try-scorer for the Raiders.

After being unable to maintain his position in the starting team for the second half of the 2009 season, Purtell was offered a release by Canberra.

=== Penrith Panthers ===
He joined the Penrith Panthers from the 2010 NRL season. In his first year at the club, Penrith finished second on the table but were eliminated from the finals series after losing both matches consecutively.

The following year, Penrith finished a disappointing 12th on the table and missed out on the finals.

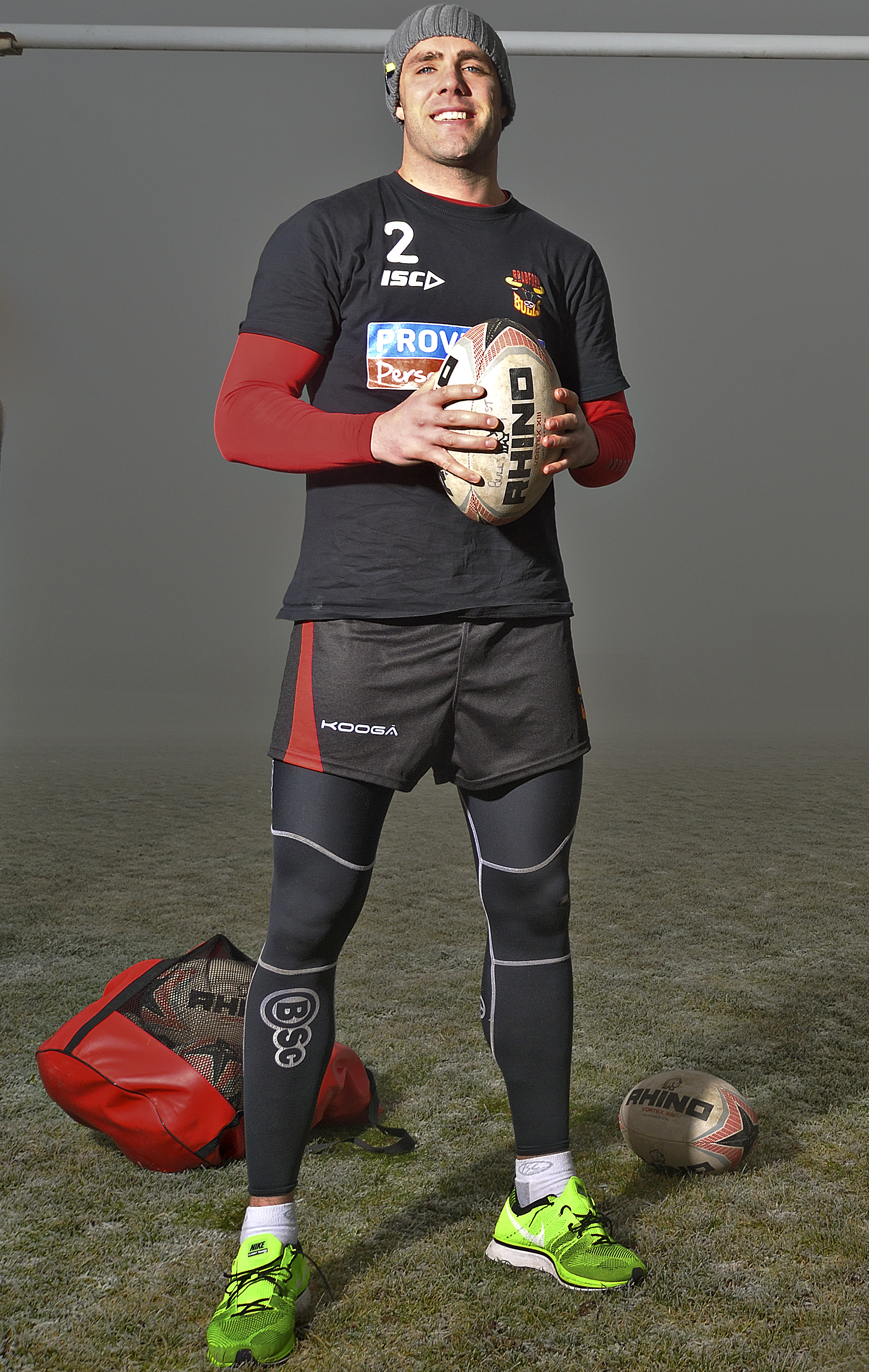
Purtell training with the Bradford Bulls

=== Bradford Bulls ===
It was announced that Purtell signed a 3-year contract with Super League team Bradford Bulls.

2012 – 2012 Season

Purtell featured in two of the four pre-season friendlies. He played against Dewsbury Rams and Hull FC.

Adrian featured in two consecutive games from Round 1 (Catalans Dragons) to Round 2 (Castleford Tigers). Purtell was injured for Rounds 3–6. He returned in Round 7 (St. Helens). He was ill for Round 8. He once again returned and featured in four consecutive games from Round 9 (Hull F.C.) to Round 12 (Huddersfield Giants). He was injured for Rounds 13–14. He returned to feature in Round 15 (Leeds Rhinos). Purtell also appeared in the Challenge Cup against Doncaster and Warrington Wolves.

2013 – 2013 Season

Purtell missed the pre-season games against Dewsbury Rams and Leeds Rhinos due to the doctors not giving him permission to play until April.

Due to the doctors orders he missed Rounds 1–6. He made his comeback and played in ten consecutive games from Round 7 (Hull Kingston Rovers) to Round 16 (Huddersfield Giants) however he missed Rounds 17-18 due to injury but returned to play in Round 19 (Widnes Vikings) to Round 25 (Castleford Tigers). Purtell also featured in the Challenge Cup against Rochdale Hornets and London Broncos.

2014 – 2014 Season

Purtell featured in the pre-season games against Hull F.C. and Castleford Tigers.

He featured in Round 1 (Castleford Tigers) to Round 21 (Huddersfield Giants). Adrian also featured in Round 4 (Oldham R.L.F.C.) to the Quarter Final (Warrington Wolves) in the Challenge Cup. Purtell scored against Castleford Tigers (1 try), Wakefield Trinity Wildcats (3 tries), Hull F.C. (1 try), Salford Red Devils (1 try), Catalans Dragons (1 try), Warrington Wolves (3 tries) and St Helens R.F.C. (1 try).

He signed a new 1 Year deal with Bradford despite their relegation from Super League.

2015 – 2015 Season

Purtell featured in the pre-season friendlies against Castleford Tigers and Leeds Rhinos.

He featured in Round 1 (Leigh Centurions) to Round 4 (Hunslet Hawks) then in Round 6 (Workington Town) to Round 9 (London Broncos). Purtell also played in Round 11 (Sheffield Eagles) to Round 13 (Featherstone Rovers) then in Round 22 (Leigh Centurions). Purtell played in Qualifier 1 (Sheffield Eagles) to Qualifier 6 (Leigh Centurions). Adrian played in the £1 Million Game (Wakefield Trinity Wildcats). He also featured in the Challenge Cup in Round 4 (Workington Town). He scored against Whitehaven (3 tries), Featherstone Rovers (1 try), Workington Town (3 tries), Sheffield Eagles (1 try), Halifax (2 tries), Dewsbury Rams (2 tries), Wakefield Trinity Wildcats (2 tries), Salford Red Devils (1 try) and Widnes Vikings (1 try).

2016 – 2016 Season

After the retirement of Chev Walker it was announced that Purtell would be the captain of the Bulls. He did not feature in any of the friendlies due to a minor injury.

Purtell featured in Round 1 (Featherstone Rovers) to Round 4 (Leigh Centurions) then in Round 9 (Sheffield Eagles) to Round 11 (Workington Town). He played in the Championship Shield Game 2 (Halifax) then in the Final (Sheffield Eagles).

=== London Broncos ===
2017 – 2017 Season

Purtell signed to play for London Broncos in the 2017 season.

Purtell featured in Round 1 (Swinton Lions) to Round 7 (Rochdale Hornets). He also featured in the Challenge Cup in Round 4 (Toronto Wolfpack).

== Albury Thunder ==
Adrian Purtell returned to his hometown to play Albury Thunder in Group 9 of the New South Wales Rugby League.

== Statistics ==
Season	Appearance	Tries	Goals	F/G	Points
2012 Bradford Bulls	10	2	0	0	8
2013 Bradford Bulls	19	5	0	0	20
2014 Bradford Bulls	24	11	0	0	44
2015 Bradford Bulls	26	16	0	0	64
2016 Bradford Bulls	9	4	0	0	16
Total	88	38	0	0	152
