= James Donaldson (rugby league) =

English professional rugby league footballer

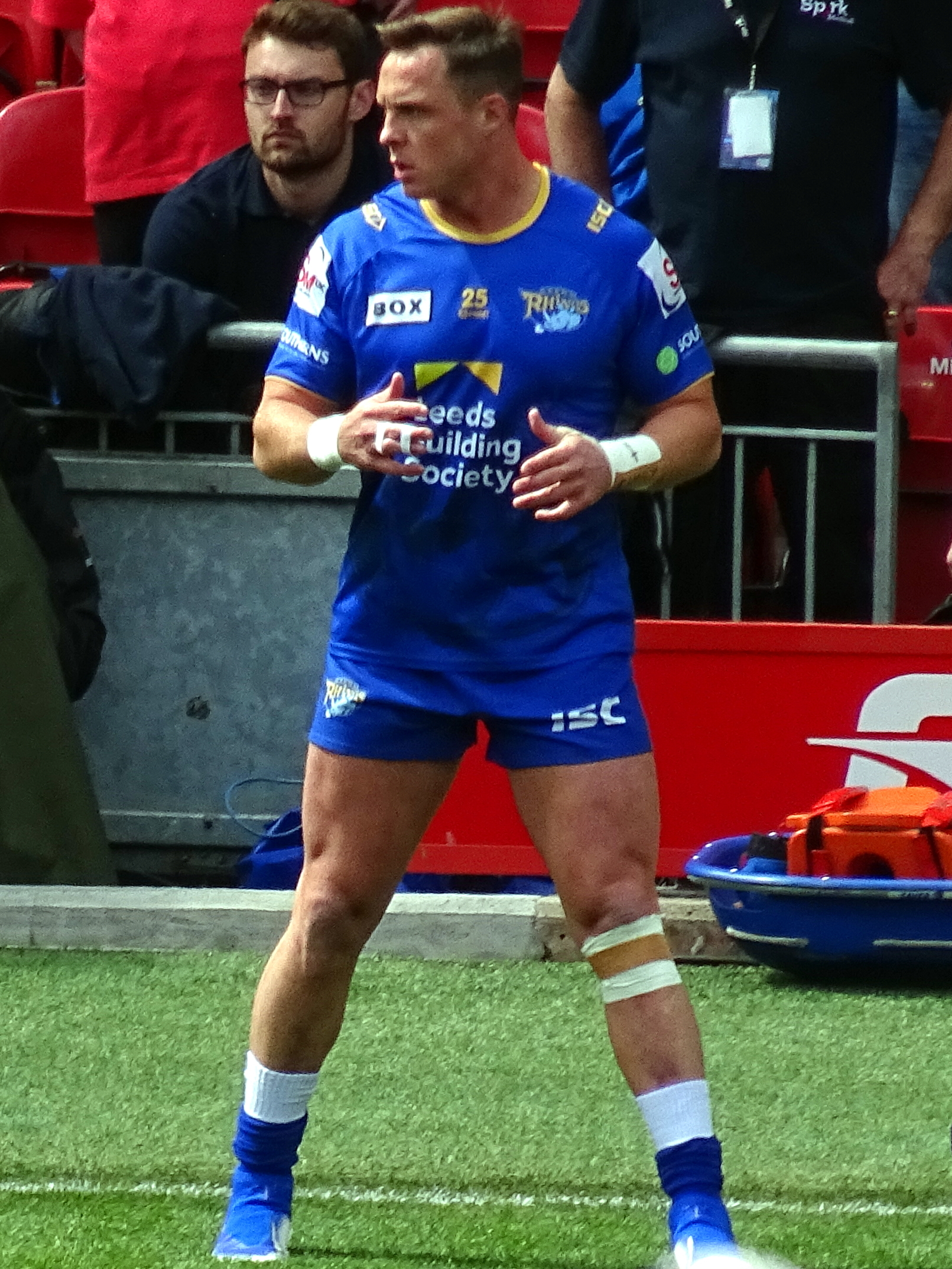

Personal information
- Full name: James Henry Donaldson
- Born: 14 September 1991 (age 34) Whitehaven, Cumbria, England
- Height: 5 ft 11 in (1.80 m)
- Weight: 13 st 12 lb (88 kg)

Playing information
- Position: Loose forward, Second-row
Club
| Years | Team | Pld | T | G | FG | P |
|---|---|---|---|---|---|---|
| 2009–14 | Bradford Bulls | 79 | 4 | 0 | 0 | 16 |
| 2013(DR) | → Dewsbury Rams | 4 | 1 | 0 | 0 | 4 |
| 2015–18 | Hull Kingston Rovers | 78 | 15 | 0 | 0 | 60 |
| 2018(DR) | → York City Knights | 1 | 1 | 0 | 0 | 4 |
| 2019–24 | Leeds Rhinos | 115 | 8 | 1 | 0 | 34 |
| 2023(DR) | → Bradford Bulls | 1 | 0 | 0 | 0 | 0 |
| 2025 | Bradford Bulls | 14 | 2 | 0 | 0 | 8 |
| | Total | 292 | 31 | 1 | 0 | 126 |
- Source: As of 5 June 2026

James Henry Donaldson (born 14 September 1991) is an English former professional rugby league footballer who last played as a loose forward and second-row for Bradford Bulls in the RFL Championship.

Donaldson, a Challenge Cup winner, previously played for the Bradford Bulls in the Super League, and on loan from Bradford at the Dewsbury Rams in the Championship. He played for Hull Kingston Rovers in the Super League and the Championship, and on loan from Hull KR at the York City Knights in League 1.

== Background ==
Donaldson was born in Whitehaven, Cumbria, England.

Donaldson subsequently attended Whitehaven School.

== Playing career ==
He primarily plays as a loose forward, but he can also play in the second-row.

=== Early career ===
He played a key role in the 2007 Rugby League European under-16's Championships, where Whitehaven School represented England.

Donaldson was much sought after as a junior and signed for the Bradford Bulls, despite offers from many other top clubs.

A loose forward, Donaldson hails from Cumbria and he has played for the famous Wath Brow Hornets amateur side.

=== Senior career ===
==== Bradford Bulls ====
Donaldson played for the Bradford Bulls between 2009 and 2014.

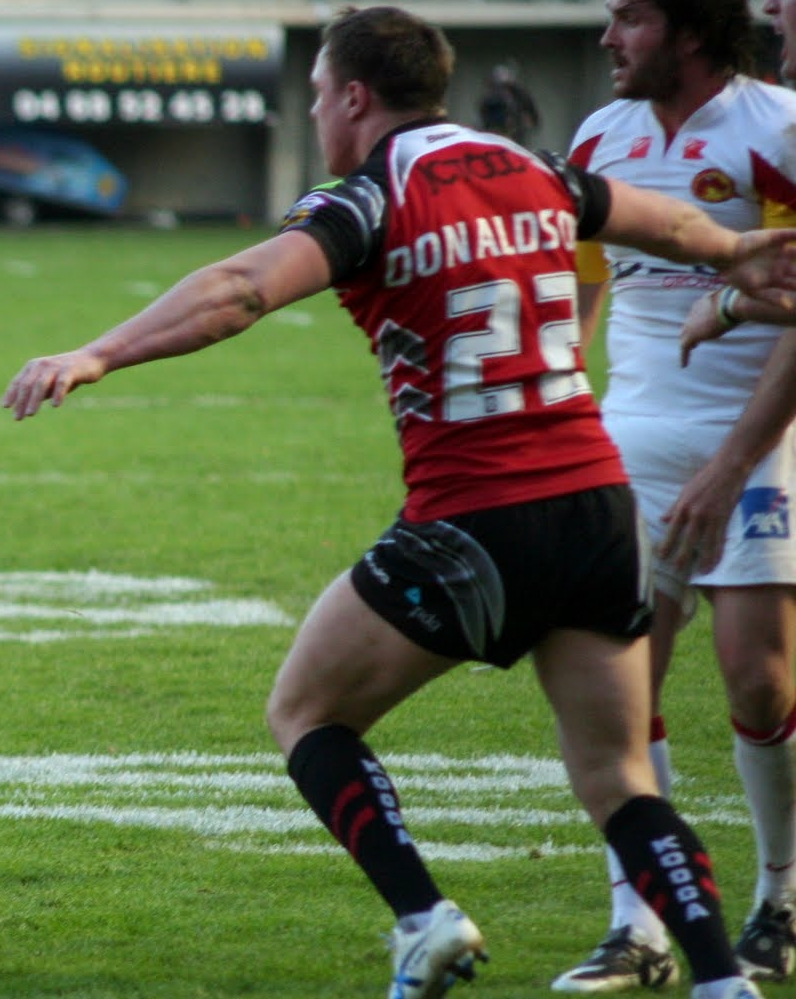
James Donaldson playing for the Bradford Bulls

===== Statistics =====
| Season | Appearance | Tries | Goals | F/G | Points |
|---|---|---|---|---|---|
| 2009: Bradford Bulls | 7 | 2 | 0 | 0 | 8 |
| 2010: Bradford Bulls | 14 | 0 | 0 | 0 | 0 |
| 2011: Bradford Bulls | 12 | 0 | 0 | 0 | 0 |
| 2012: Bradford Bulls | 2 | 0 | 0 | 0 | 0 |
| 2013: Bradford Bulls | 19 | 2 | 0 | 0 | 8 |
| 2014: Bradford Bulls | 25 | 0 | 0 | 0 | 0 |
| 2023: Bradford Bulls | 1 | 0 | 0 | 0 | 0 |
| Total | 80 | 4 | 0 | 0 | 16 |

==== Dewsbury Rams ====
Donaldson appeared for the Dewsbury Rams in the 2013 rugby league season, as part of the Bradford Bulls' dual-registration partnership with the club.

===== Statistics =====
| Season | Appearance | Tries | Goals | F/G | Points |
|---|---|---|---|---|---|
| 2013: Dewsbury Rams | 4 | 1 | 0 | 0 | 4 |
| Total | 4 | 1 | 0 | 0 | 4 |

==== Hull Kingston Rovers ====
Donaldson joined Hull Kingston Rovers ahead of the 2015 Super League season.

He represented the club in the 2015 Challenge Cup Final.

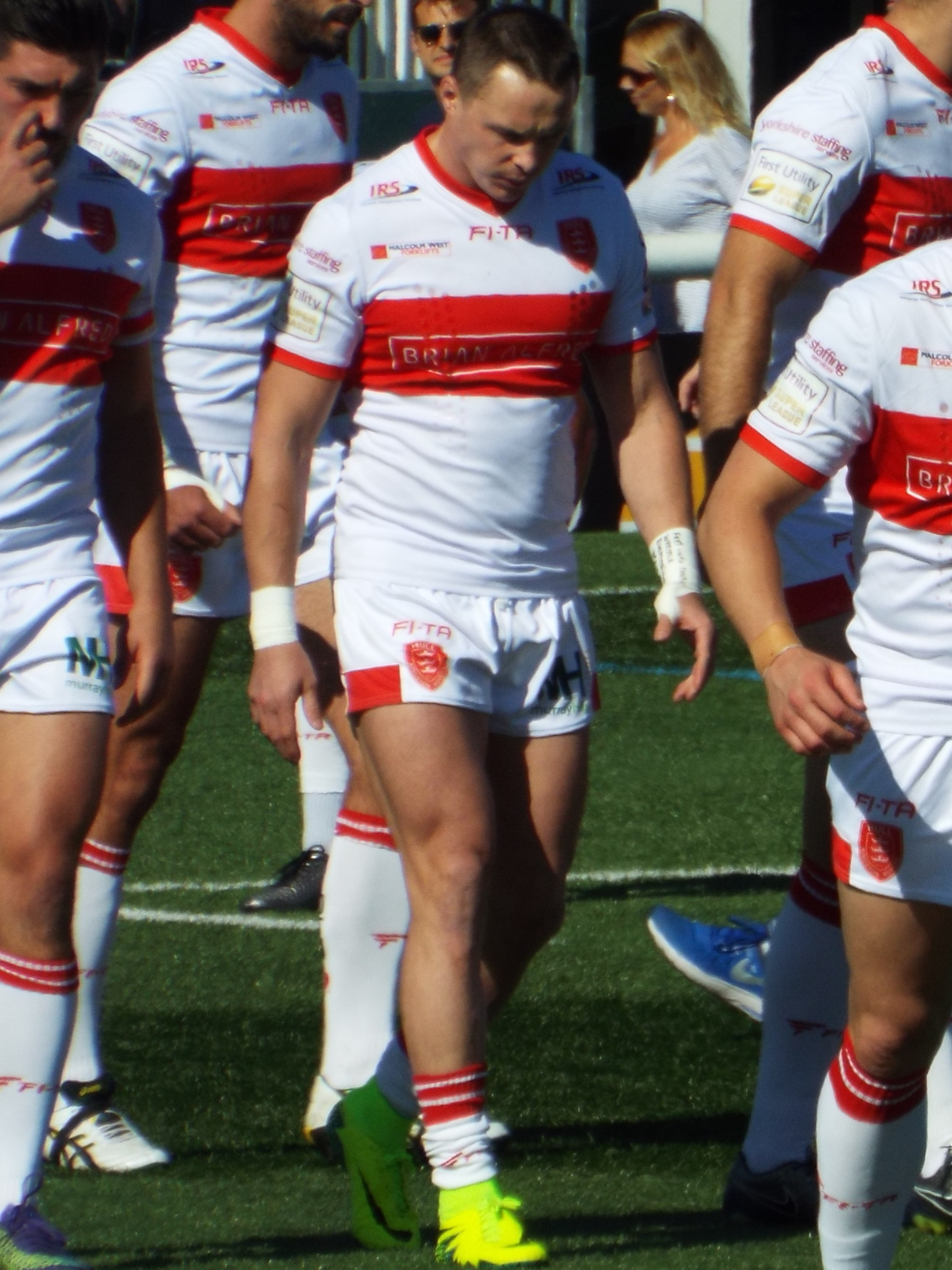
Donaldson playing for Hull KR

Donaldson suffered relegation from the Super League with Hull Kingston Rovers in the 2016 season, due to losing the Million Pound Game by the Salford Red Devils.

In the Good Friday Championship league clash against Featherstone Rovers on 14 April 2017, Donaldson unfortunately suffered a season-ending anterior cruciate ligament (ACL) knee injury in Hull Kingston Rovers' 30–22 victory at Craven Park.

Donaldson (currently injured at the time), was part of the Hull Kingston Rovers' side that won promotion back to the Super League, at the first time of asking following relegation the season prior, securing automatic promotion through the 2017 Qualifiers process.

Donaldson made his long-awaited return from his ACL kneeinjury on 15 March 2018, in a Super League fixture against the Huddersfield Giants, Hull Kingston Rovers ran-out 6–38 victors, with James featuring from off the interchange bench.

It was revealed on 10 October 2018, that Donaldson would be departing Hull Kingston Rovers following a restructure of the club's on field personnel.

===== Statistics =====
| Season | Appearance | Tries | Goals | F/G | Points |
|---|---|---|---|---|---|
| 2015: Hull Kingston Rovers | 26 | 0 | 0 | 0 | 0 |
| 2016: Hull Kingston Rovers | 20 | 4 | 0 | 0 | 16 |
| 2017: Hull Kingston Rovers | 11 | 9 | 0 | 0 | 36 |
| 2018: Hull Kingston Rovers | 21 | 2 | 0 | 0 | 8 |
| Total | 78 | 15 | 0 | 0 | 60 |

==== York City Knights ====
Donaldson appeared on only one occasion for the York City Knights on 11 March 2018, four-days later he made his long-awaited return to the Hull Kingston Rovers' fold, following his long-term ACL knee injury that he sustained the season prior.

Donaldson scored for the York City Knights on a single dual-registration appearance, in a 22–24 victory over Oldham.

===== Statistics =====
| Season | Appearance | Tries | Goals | F/G | Points |
|---|---|---|---|---|---|
| 2018: York City Knights | 1 | 1 | 0 | 0 | 4 |
| Total | 1 | 1 | 0 | 0 | 4 |

==== Leeds Rhinos ====
It was revealed on 6 December 2018, that Donaldson had been handed a trial at the Leeds Rhinos ahead of the 2019 campaign.

Donaldson was subsequently given a chance to "prove his worth" to new Leeds Rhinos Head Coach David Furner, in all hopes of earning a contract at the club on a permanent basis.

On 8 January 2019, after a successful trial, Donaldson signed a one-year contract with the Leeds Rhinos.

Donaldson made his Leeds Rhinos' début on 2 February 2019, in a 26–6 round 1 Super League defeat against the Warrington Wolves at the Halliwell Jones Stadium.

Donaldson scored his first try for the Leeds Rhinos on 19 April 2019, in a 38–18 victory over the Huddersfield Giants.

It was announced on 12 September. Donaldson would be staying at Leeds until 2021.

On 17 October 2020, he played in the 2020 Challenge Cup Final victory for Leeds over Salford at Wembley Stadium. On 24 September 2022, Donaldson played for Leeds in their 24–12 loss to St Helens RFC in the 2022 Super League Grand Final.

=== Bradford Bulls (re-join) ===
On 20 August 2024 it was reported that he would re-join Bradford Bulls in the RFL Championship on a 3-year deal.

On 22 December 2025 he announced his retirement as a professional

==== Statistics ====
| Season | Appearance | Tries | Goals | F/G | Points |
|---|---|---|---|---|---|
| 2019: Leeds Rhinos | 14 | 1 | 0 | 0 | 4 |
| Total | 14 | 1 | 0 | 0 | 4 |
