= Adam Sidlow =

English rugby league footballer (born 1987)

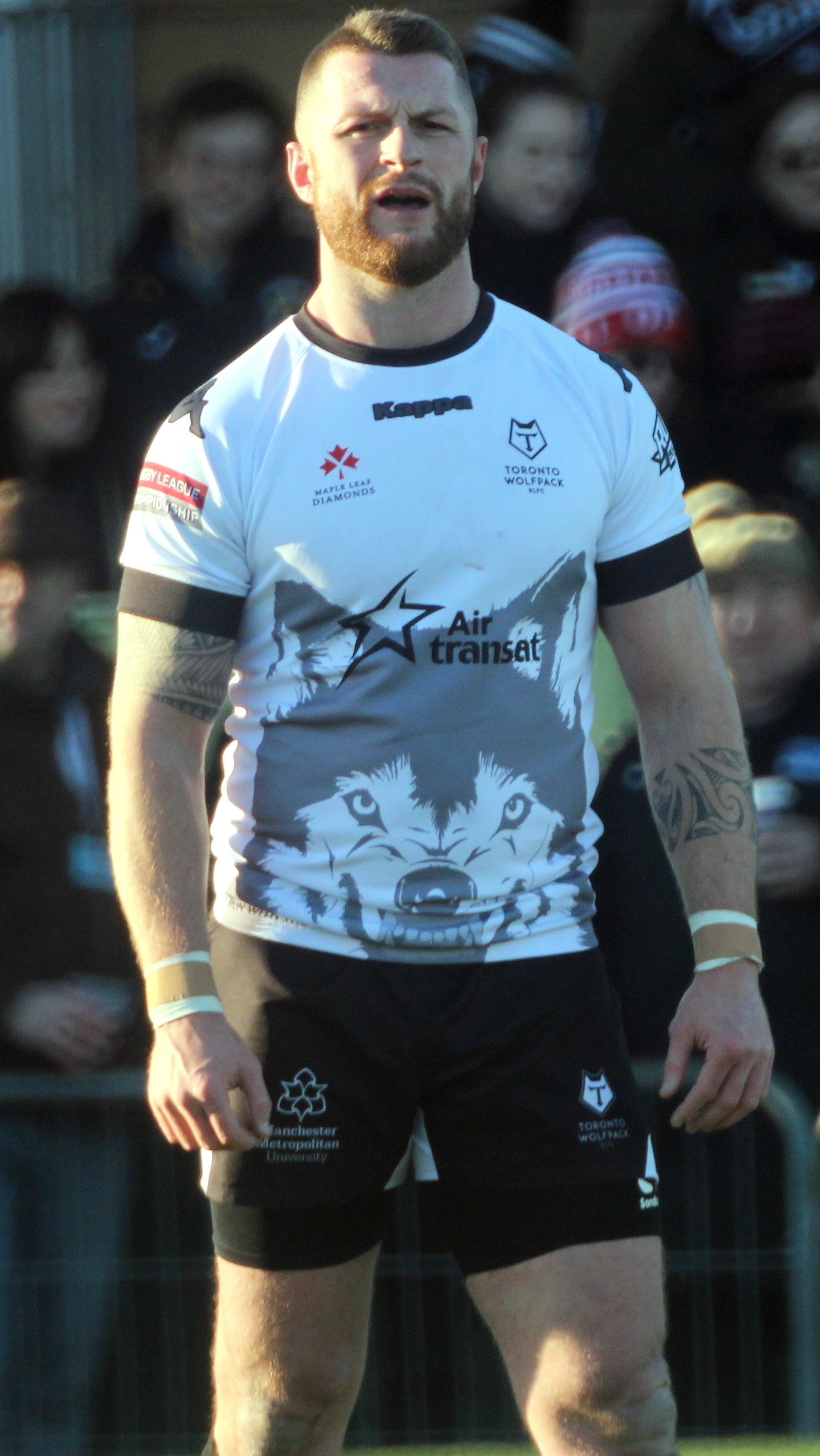

Personal information
- Full name: Adam Sidlow
- Born: 25 October 1987 (age 39) England
- Height: 6 ft 4 in (1.93 m)
- Weight: 17 st 13 lb (114 kg)

Playing information
- Position: Prop, Second-row
Club
Years	Team	Pld	T	G	FG	P
2006	Widnes Vikings	1	0	0	0	0
2007	Workington Town	18	9	0	0	36
2007	Widnes Vikings	4	0	0	0	0
2008–12	Salford City Reds	82	14	0	0	56
2013–16	Bradford Bulls	102	19	1	0	78
2017–20	Toronto Wolfpack	80	16	0	0	64
2021–22	Leigh Centurions	34	7	0	0	28
2023–24	Salford Red Devils	12	0	0	0	0
2024(loan)	Oldham RLFC	7	0	0	0	0
2025	Swinton Lions	19	1	0	0	4
	Total	359	66	1	0	266
- Source: As of 3 November 2026

Adam Sidlow (born 25 October 1987) is an English former professional rugby league footballer who last played as a prop for the Swinton Lions in the RFL League 1. He is assistant coach at St Helens RFC.

He previously played for the Widnes Vikings in two separate spells in National League One, Workington Town in 2007 National League Two and the Salford City Reds in 2008 National League One and the Super League. Sidlow also played for the Bradford Bulls in the Super League and the Championship, and the Toronto Wolfpack in all three tiers of professional rugby league in Europe.

== Early career ==
In his junior and youth career, he represented Lancashire Academy and was in the train-on squad for the England Academy.

== Playing career ==
=== Salford City Reds ===
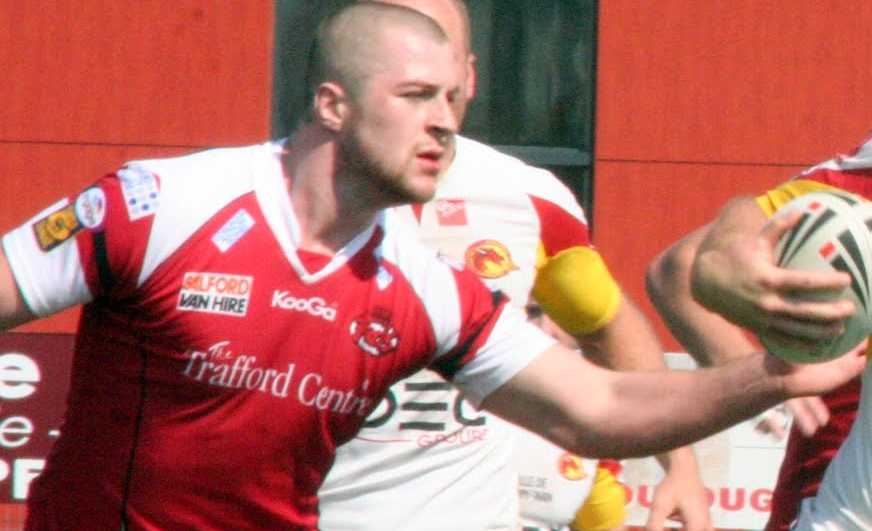
Sidlow playing for Salford

Sidlow played for Salford between 2008 and 2012.

=== Bradford Bulls ===
2013 - 2013 Season

Sidlow featured in the pre-season friendlies against Dewsbury and Leeds.

He featured in fourteen consecutive games from round 1 Wakefield Trinity to round 14 against Leeds. He was injured for rounds 15-16 but he returned in round 17 Hull Kingston Rovers to round 21 Wigan. Sidlow was injured for the rest of the season. Sidlow featured in the Challenge Cup against the Rochdale Hornets and London Broncos.

2014 - 2014 Season

Sidlow featured in the pre-season friendlies against Hull FC, Dewsbury and Castleford.

He featured in round 1 Castleford to round 4 against Hull FC. Sidlow also appeared in round 6 Hull Kingston Rovers and then round 8 Salford to round 9 Leeds. Sidlow played in round 11 Warrington to round 26 Widnes. Sidlow also featured in round 5 against the Catalans Dragons in the Challenge Cup.

Sidlow re-signed with Bradford for another year even though they had been relegated to the Championship.

2015 - 2015 Season

Sidlow featured in the pre-season friendlies against Castleford and Leeds

He featured in round 1 Leigh to round 5 Batley then in round 7 Halifax to round 22 against Leigh. Sidlow played in Qualifier 1 Sheffield to Qualifier 6 Leigh. Sidlow played in Million Pound Game against Wakefield Trinity. He also featured in the Challenge Cup in round 4 Workington Town to round 5 against Hull Kingston Rovers.

2016 - 2016 Season

He featured in round 1 Featherstone Rovers to round 5 Oldham then in round 12 London Broncos to round 23 Featherstone. Sidlow played in the Championship Shield Game 1 Whitehaven to the Final Sheffield.

=== Toronto Wolfpack ===
Following the Bulls' liquidation at the start of the 2017 season, Sidlow joined League 1 side Toronto Wolfpack.

=== Leigh ===
On 20 November 2020 it was announced that Sidlow would join the Leigh Centurions for the 2021 season. In round 18 of the 2021 Super League season, he scored two tries for Leigh in a 28–34 loss against Hull KR. On 28 May 2022, Sidlow played for Leigh in their 2022 RFL 1895 Cup final victory over Featherstone. On 3 October 2022, Sidlow played for Leigh in their Million Pound Game victory over Batley which saw the club promoted back to the Super League.

=== Salford Red Devils ===
In the 2023 Super League season, Sidlow played 12 matches for Salford as the club finished 7th on the table and missed the playoffs.

=== Swinton Lions ===
On 17 November 2024, it was reported that he had signed for Swinton in the RFL League 1.

On 10 December 2025 he announced his retirement

== Statistics ==
Season	Appearance	Tries	Goals	F/G	Points
2006 Widnes Vikings	1	0	0	0	0
2007 Widnes Vikings	4	0	0	0	0
2007 Workington Town	18	9	0	0	36
2008 Salford City Reds	0	0	0	0	0
2009 Salford City Reds	17	1	0	0	4
2010 Salford City Reds	25	5	0	0	20
2011 Salford City Reds	21	5	0	0	20
2012 Salford City Reds	19	3	0	0	12
2013 Bradford Bulls	21	5	0	0	20
2014 Bradford Bulls	25	3	0	0	12
2015 Bradford Bulls	30	6	0	0	24
2016 Bradford Bulls	26	5	1	0	22
Total	207	42	1	0	170
