= Oliver Roberts =

Ireland international rugby league footballer

Oli Roberts
Personal information
- Full name: Oliver Roberts
- Born: 24 December 1994 (age 31) Huddersfield, West Yorkshire, England
- Height: 6 ft 4 in (1.93 m)
- Weight: 17 st 0 lb (108 kg)

Playing information
- Position: Second-row, Loose forward
Club
Years	Team	Pld	T	G	FG	P
2013–14	Bradford Bulls	6	0	0	0	0
2015–22	Huddersfield Giants	95	17	0	0	68
2015(loan)	→ Sheffield Eagles	2	0	0	0	0
2015(loan)	→ Oldham	8	2	0	0	8
2020(loan)	→ Halifax	1	1	0	0	4
2020(loan)	→ Salford Red Devils	8	0	0	0	0
2021(loan)	→ Salford Red Devils	4	0	0	0	0
2022(DR)	→ Halifax Panthers	3	0	0	0	0
2022	Newcastle Thunder	7	1	0	0	4
2023–25	Sheffield Eagles	48	7	0	0	28
2026–	Midlands Hurricanes	0	0	0	0	0
	Total	182	28	0	0	112
Representative
Years	Team	Pld	T	G	FG	P
2015–	Ireland	9	6	0	0	24
- Source: As of 3 October 2025

Oliver Roberts (born 24 December 1994) is an Ireland international rugby league footballer who plays as a second-row and loose forward for Midlands Hurricanes.

He played for the Bradford Bulls in the Super League. He spent time on loan from Huddersfield at the Sheffield Eagles in the Kingstone Press Championship, Oldham in Kingstone Press League 1 and Salford in the Super League.

== Background ==
Roberts was born in Huddersfield, West Yorkshire, England.

== Bradford Bulls ==
Roberts who started his career at the Bradford Bulls was involved in the Bradford Bulls scholarship system from the Under-15s and was given a 3-year professional contract at the start of the 2013 season.

Oliver is a product of the Bradford Bulls Junior Development system.

=== 2013 ===
Roberts missed the pre-season friendlies against the Dewsbury Rams and Leeds Rhinos due to an injury.

He featured in Round 18 (St Helens R.F.C.). Oliver also featured in Round 21 (Wigan Warriors).

=== 2014 ===
Roberts featured in the pre-season games against Hull FC, Dewsbury Rams, and the Castleford Tigers.

He featured in Round 5 (Huddersfield Giants) and then Round 7 (Widnes Vikings). Roberts appeared in Round 10 (Wigan Warriors). He featured in Round 4 (Oldham) in the Challenge Cup.

Roberts secured his dream move to play-off contenders Huddersfield Giants.

== Huddersfield ==
=== 2015 ===
He signed for the Huddersfield Giants on a 2 Year Deal.

In October and November 2015, Roberts was selected in Ireland's team for the 2015 European Cup. He made his international début in Ireland's opening match against France.

=== 2016 ===
Roberts featured in Round 1 (St Helens R.F.C.) to Round 6 (Catalans Dragons) then in Round 8 (Salford Red Devils) to Round 23 (Warrington Wolves). Ollie also played in the Super 8 Qualifier 1 (Salford Red Devils) to Qualifier 7 (Hull Kingston Rovers). He played in the Challenge Cup in Round 6 (Leeds Rhinos). He scored against Salford Red Devils (1 try) and Featherstone Rovers (2 tries).

In 2016 he was called up to the Ireland squad for the 2017 Rugby League World Cup European Pool B qualifiers.

=== 2017 ===
Roberts featured in Round 1 (Widnes Vikings) to Round 3 (Hull F.C.). He scored against Wakefield Trinity (1 try) and Hull F.C. (1 try).

=== 2020 ===
Roberts agreed to extend his current loan deal with Salford Red Devils for the whole 2021 season.

== Midlands Hurricanes ==
On 2 October 2025 it was reported that he would join Midlands Hurricanes for 2026 on a 2-year deal

== International ==
Despite having represented Ireland, in 2019 he was one of four Giants players to be called into the England Knights squad.

== Statistics ==
Statistics do not include pre-season friendlies.

Season	Appearance	Tries	Goals	F/G	Points
2013 Bradford Bulls	2	0	0	0	0
2014 Bradford Bulls	4	0	0	0	0
2015 Huddersfield Giants	0	0	0	0	0
2016 Huddersfield Giants	7	3	0	0	12
2017 Huddersfield Giants	22	4	0	0	16
Total	40	5	0	0	20
