= Sam Wood (rugby league, born 1993) =

English rugby league footballer

Personal information
- Full name: Sam Wood
- Born: 23 December 1993 (age 32) Halifax, West Yorkshire

Playing information
- Position: Centre
Club
Years	Team	Pld	T	G	FG	P
2013–14	Bradford Bulls	9	1	0	0	4
2014–15	Dewsbury Rams	12	5	0	0	20
	Total	21	6	0	0	24
- Source: As of 26 July 2015

Sam Wood (born 23 December 1993) is an English former professional rugby league footballer who last played for the Dewsbury Rams.

Wood is a product of the Bradford Bulls Junior Development system. His favoured position is at Centre.

== Playing career ==
=== Bradford Bulls ===
Statistics do NOT include pre-season friendlies. Wood has been involved in the Bulls scholarship system from the Under 15's and was given a 2 Year professional contract at the start of the 2013 season.

2013 - 2013 Season

Wood featured in the pre-season friendly against Dewsbury Rams, he was not selected for the friendly against Leeds Rhinos.

He made his début in the Challenge Cup against Rochdale Hornets on the wing. He then featured in Round 21 (Wigan Warriors). Wood played in Round 26 (London Broncos) to Round 27 (Huddersfield Giants). He scored against Rochdale Hornets (1 try). He signed a 3 Year Extension to his contract.

2014 - 2014 Season

Wood featured in the pre-season friendlies against Hull F.C. and Dewsbury Rams.

He featured in Round 6 (Hull Kingston Rovers) to Round 7 (Widnes Vikings) then in Round 10 (Wigan Warriors). He played in Round 12 (St Helens R.F.C.). He also featured in Round 4 (Oldham R.L.F.C.) in the Challenge Cup.

He was released from his contract at the end of the season.

=== Dewsbury Rams ===
In September 2014, Sam signed a permanent two-year deal with the Rams after being jointly registered with the club along with the Bulls in 2014.

== Statistics ==
Season	Appearance	Tries	Goals	F/G	Points
2013 Bradford Bulls	4	1	0	0	4
2014 Bradford Bulls	5	0	0	0	0
2014 Dewsbury Rams	11	5	0	0	20
2015 Dewsbury Rams	1	0	0	0	0
Total	21	6	0	0	24
