= 2013 Wakefield Trinity Wildcats season =

Rugby league team season

- Super League XVIII Rank: 11th
- Challenge Cup: 5th round
← 2012	2014 →

In the 2013 rugby league season, Wakefield Trinity (then known as Wakefield Trinity Wildcats) competed in Super League XVIII and the 2013 Challenge Cup.

== Results ==
=== Super League ===
==== League table ====
Super League XVIII
Pos	Team	Pld	W	D	L	PF	PA	PD	Pts	Qualification
1	Huddersfield Giants (L)	27	21	0	6	851	507	+344	42	Play-offs
2	Warrington Wolves	27	20	1	6	836	461	+375	41	Play-offs
3	Leeds Rhinos	27	18	1	8	712	507	+205	37	Play-offs
4	Wigan Warriors (C)	27	17	1	9	816	460	+356	35	Play-offs
5	St. Helens	27	15	1	11	678	536	+142	31	Play-offs
6	Hull F.C.	27	13	2	12	652	563	+89	28	Play-offs
7	Catalans Dragons	27	13	2	12	619	604	+15	28	Play-offs
8	Hull Kingston Rovers	27	13	0	14	642	760	−118	26	Play-offs
9	Bradford Bulls	27	10	2	15	640	658	−18	22	
10	Widnes Vikings	27	10	2	15	695	841	−146	22	
11	Wakefield Trinity Wildcats	27	10	1	16	660	749	−89	21	
12	Castleford Tigers	27	9	2	16	702	881	−179	20	
13	London Broncos	27	5	2	20	487	946	−459	12	
14	Salford City Reds	27	6	1	20	436	953	−517	11 (Note: Salford deducted 2 points on 14 June 2013 for fielding 14 players during home game against Castleford)	

Source: superleague.co.uk and BBC Sport
Rules for classification: 1st on competition points; 2nd on match points difference. Competition points: for win = 2; for draw = 1; for loss = 0.
(C) Champions; (L) League Leaders' Shield Winners

==== Super League results ====
W Win D Draw L Loss

Super League results
Date	Round	Versus	H/A	Venue	Result	Score	Tries	Goals	Attendance	Report
3 February	1	Bradford Bulls	A	Odsal Stadium	L	6–40	Collis	Sykes	10,263	RLP
9 February	2	Hull Kingston Rovers	H	Rapid Solicitors Stadium	W	36–20	Cockayne (3), Aiton, Collis, Fox, Lyne	Sykes (4)	9,237	RLP
17 February	3	London Broncos	A	The Stoop	W	28–0	Cockayne (2), Fox, Kirmond, Mathers	Sykes (4)	1,887	RLP
24 February	4	Huddersfield Giants	H	Rapid Solicitors Stadium	L	16–18	Cockayne, Fox, L. Smith	Sykes (2)	8,467	RLP
2 March	5	Catalans Dragons	A	Stade Gilbert Brutus	L	22–29	Collis, Fox, Mathers, L. Smith	Sykes (3)	7,191	RLP
10 March	6	Salford City Reds	H	Rapid Solicitors Stadium	D	23–23	Cockayne, Collis, Fox, Mariano, Washbrook	Sykes (1 + FG)	6,986	RLP
15 March	7	St Helens	A	Langtree Park	L	18–52	Cockayne, Collis, Mathers	Sykes (3)	11,211	RLP
29 March	9	Castleford Tigers	A	The Jungle	W	37–16	Fox (2), Kirmond, Mathers, L. Smith, T. Smith	Sykes (4 + FG), L. Smith (2)	7,705	RLP
1 April	10	Hull F.C.	H	Rapid Solicitors Stadium	L	22–34	Collis, Fox, Kirmond, L. Smith	Sykes (3)	8,126	RLP
7 April	11	Wigan Warriors	A	DW Stadium	L	24–44	Aiton, Mathers, Mellars, L. Smith	Sykes (4)	12,152	RLP
14 April	12	Warrington Wolves	H	Rapid Solicitors Stadium	L	34–41	Fox (2), Sykes (2), Lyne, Wood	Sykes (5)	7,985	RLP
20 April	13	Widnes Vikings	A	Halton Stadium	W	28–26	Aiton, Cockayne, L. Smith, T. Smith, Wilkes	Sykes (3), L. Smith	5,405	RLP
4 May	14	Catalans Dragons	H	Rapid Solicitors Stadium	W	30–12	Fox (2), Kirmond (2), Cockayne	L. Smith (5)	6,125	RLP
19 May	15	Hull Kingston Rovers	A	Craven Park	L	18–44	Cockayne, Collis, L. Smith	L. Smith (3)	6,933	RLP
25 May	16	Castleford Tigers	N	City of Manchester Stadium	L	24–49	Collis (2), Annakin, Kirmond	L. Smith (4)	30,793	RLP
2 June	17	Wigan Warriors	H	Rapid Solicitors Stadium	L	23–36	Kirmond (2), Collins, Wood	L. Smith (2 + FG), Cockayne	8,459	RLP
10 June	18	Salford City Reds	A	Salford City Stadium	W	46–10	Aiton, Cockayne, Collins, Fox, Kirmond, Mathers, Mathers, Sykes, Wilkes	L. Smith (7)	2,327	RLP
23 June	19	London Broncos	H	Rapid Solicitors Stadium	W	46–14	Kirmond (3), Fox, Mariano, Mathers, Sykes, Wood	L. Smith (7)	8,203	RLP
1 July	20	Hull F.C.	A	KC Stadium	W	27–26	Fox (2), L. Smith, Sykes, Wilkes	L. Smith (3 + FG)	10,000	RLP
8 July	21	Widnes Vikings	H	Rapid Solicitors Stadium	W	24–14	Collins, Lauit'iti, Mariano, Wildie	L. Smith (4)	7,543	RLP
19 July	22	Leeds Rhinos	A	Headingley Stadium	L	18–20	Lauit'iti, Mariano, Raleigh	L. Smith (3)	18,387	RLP
26 July	8	Leeds Rhinos	H	Rapid Solicitors Stadium	L	24–31	Aiton, Mariano, Poore	L. Smith (4)	10,031	RLP
4 August	23	Bradford Bulls	H	Rapid Solicitors Stadium	L	24–26	Fox, Lyne, Mariano, L. Smith	L. Smith (4)	8,084	RLP
10 August	24	Warrington Wolves	A	Halliwell Jones Stadium	L	14–26	Kay, Kirmond, Mariano	L. Smith	9,250	RLP
18 August	25	St Helens	H	Rapid Solicitors Stadium	L	12–26	Amor, Lyne	Goulding, L. Smith	7,985	RLP
18 August	25	Huddersfield Giants	A	Kirklees Stadium	L	0–40			8,757	RLP
8 September	27	Castleford Tigers	H	Rapid Solicitors Stadium	W	36–32	Kay (3), Mariano (2), Lauiti'iti, Trout	L. Smith (3), Cockayne	6,404	RLP

=== Challenge Cup ===
W Win L Loss

Challenge Cup results
Date	Round	Versus	H/A	Venue	Result	Score	Tries	Goals	Attendance	Report
20 April	4	Hemel Stags	H	Rapid Solicitors Stadium	W	66–6	Kay (2), Molloy (2), L. Smith (2), Mariano, Poore, Shulver, Trout, Wildie	L. Smith (9), Wildie, Wood	2,456	RLP
10 May	5	Hull F.C.	A	KC Stadium	L	6–24	Lauiti'iti	L. Smith	7,687	RLP
