= Matty Blythe =

English rugby league footballer (born 1988)

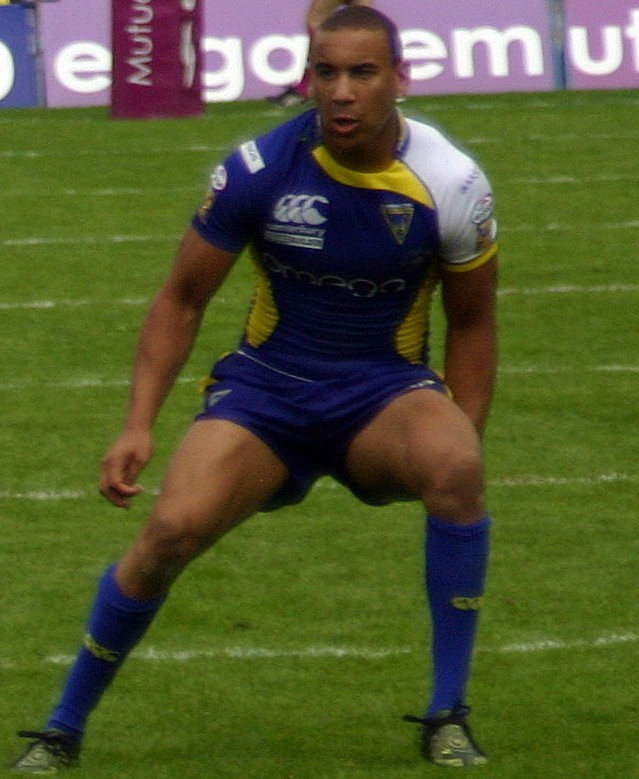

Personal information
- Full name: Matthew Blythe
- Born: 20 November 1988 (age 37) Urmston, Salford, England

Playing information
- Height: 6 ft 1 in (1.85 m)
- Weight: 14 st 11 lb (94 kg)
- Position: Wing, Centre, Second-row, Loose forward
Club
Years	Team	Pld	T	G	FG	P
2007–12	Warrington Wolves	69	11	0	0	48
2010(loan)–11	→ Leigh Centurions	21	12	0	0	48
2013–16	Bradford Bulls	64	20	0	0	80
2017	Warrington Wolves	3	0	0	0	0
2017(DR)	→ Rochdale Hornets	2	0	0	0	0
	Total	159	43	0	0	176

Matty Blythe (born 20 November 1988) is an English former professional rugby league footballer who played in the 2000s and 2010s. He played at club level in the Super League for the Warrington Wolves (two spells) and the Bradford Bulls, and in the Championship for the Leigh Centurions (loan), the Bradford Bulls, and the Rochdale Hornets (dual registration), as a wing, centre, second-row or loose forward.

== Playing career ==
=== Warrington Wolves ===
Blythe's career began with the Warrington club in 2007.

== Bradford Bulls ==
In 2013 Blythe was loaned out to Super League side the Bradford Bulls for the 2013 Bradford Bulls season. Blythe played in the pre-season friendlies against Dewsbury and Leeds.

The following year, he featured in six consecutive games from the commencement of the season. He then missed a large chunk of games through injury. Blythe returned and featured in Round 14 Leeds to Round 21 Wigan and also in the Challenge Cup against London Broncos. Blythe scored seven tries in the regular season that year, which included a brace against Salford City Reds. He signed a permanent three-year deal with the Bradford club towards the back end of the 2014season.

Blythe missed Rounds 1–5 due to injury. He featured in Round 6 (Hull Kingston Rovers) to Round 9 Leeds. He was injured for Rounds 10–14. Blythe played in Round 15 (Wakefield Trinity Wildcats) to Round 20 (St Helens R.F.C.) then in Round 22 Wigan to Round 26 (Widnes). He also featured in Round 4 (Oldham) and in the Quarter Final (Warrington) in the Challenge Cup.

Blythe featured in Round 17 Dewsbury Round 23 (Halifax). Blythe played in Qualifier 1 (Sheffield) to Qualifier 4 (Widnes) then in Qualifier 7 (Halifax). Blythe played in the £1 Million Game (Wakefield Trinity Wildcats). He scored against the Batley side (2 tries), the Hunslet Hawks (1 try), Leigh (3 tries) and the Wakefield Trinity Wildcats (1 try). However, the Bradford side were relegated to the Kingstone Press Championship by Wakefield Trinity club in the £1 Million Game.

Blythe featured in both pre-season friendlies against Leeds and Castleford Tigers before the 2016 Bradford Bulls season.

He featured in Round 1 (Featherstone Rovers) to Round 4 (Leigh) then in Round 6 (Bailey) to Round 7 (London Broncos). Blythe played in round 13 (Swinton Lions) to round 15 (Leigh Centurions) then in round 19 (Halifax) to round 21 (Whitehaven). He played in round 23 (Featherstone Rovers). Blythe featured in the Championship Shield Game 1 (Whitehaven) to Game 2 (Halifax). Blythe played in the Challenge Cup in the fourth round Dewsbury.

=== Return to Warrington Wolves ===
At the end of the season Blythe signed a one-year deal with former club Warrington. He managed to get three games in 2017's Super League XXII, against Castleford Tigers, Wigan and Salford, all three games were lost. Blythe was loaned out to Rochdale Hornets of the Kingstone Press Championship on dual registration where he played twice against Halifax and the Sheffield Eagles. He announced his retirement having been released by Warrington outfit.

== Statistics ==
Season	Appearance	Tries	Goals	F/G	Points
2007 Warrington Wolves	1	0	0	0	0
2008 Warrington Wolves	7	1	0	0	4
2009 Warrington Wolves	11	1	0	0	4
2010 Warrington Wolves	1	1	0	0	4
2011 Warrington Wolves	22	3	0	0	12
2012 Warrington Wolves	18	6	0	0	24
2013 Bradford Bulls	16	7	0	0	28
2014 Bradford Bulls	17	1	0	0	4
2015 Bradford Bulls	15	7	0	0	28
2016 Bradford Bulls	16	5	0	0	20
2017 Warrington Wolves	3	0	0	0	0
2017 Rochdale Hornets	2	0	0	0	0
Total	129	32	0	0	128
