= Curtis Naughton =

English rugby league footballer

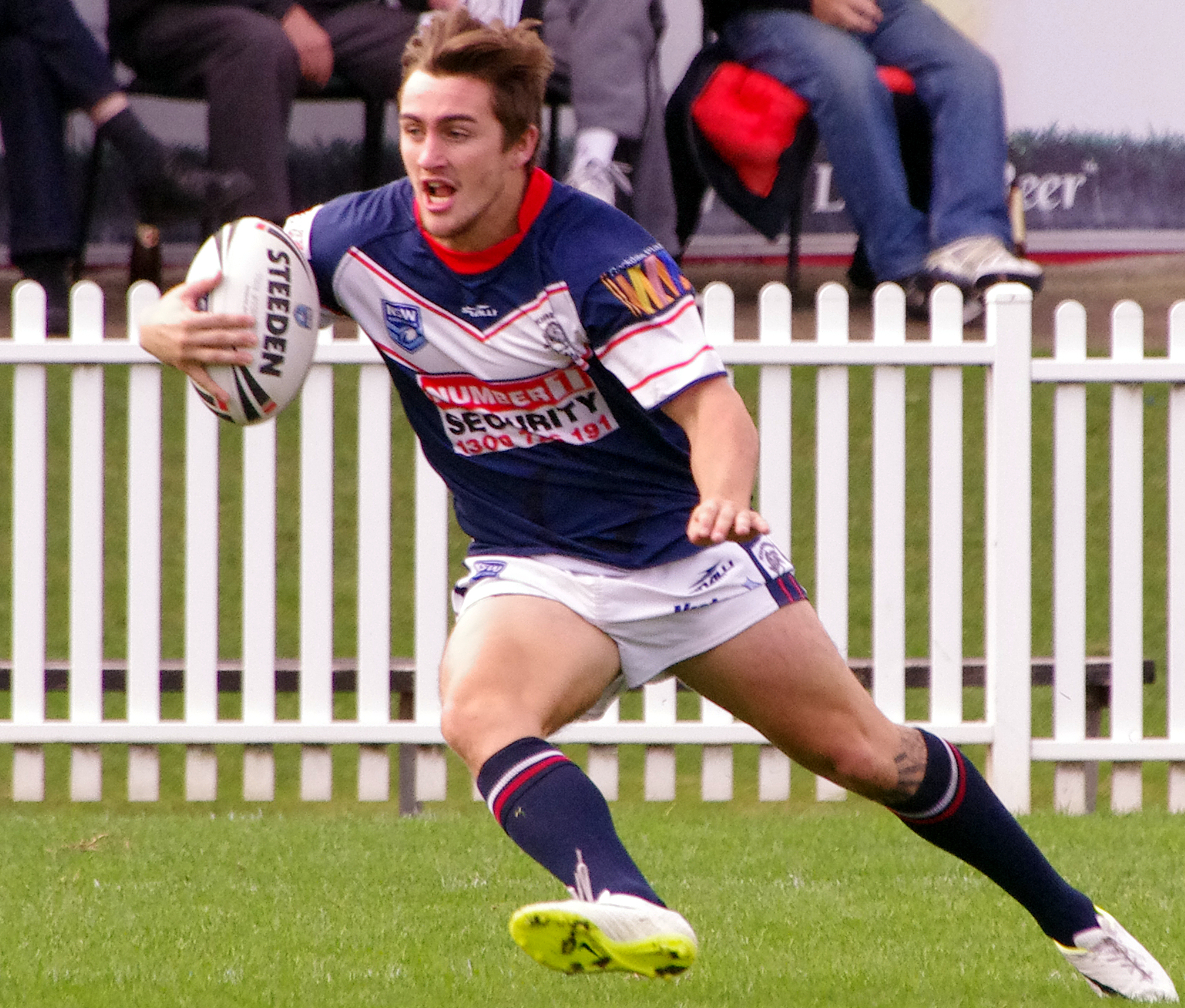

Personal information
- Born: 25 February 1995 (age 31) Dewsbury, England
- Height: 5 ft 11 in (180 cm)
- Weight: 14 st 9 lb (93 kg)

Playing information
- Position: Fullback, Wing
Club
Years	Team	Pld	T	G	FG	P
2013	Bradford Bulls	1	0	0	0	0
2014	Sydney Roosters	10	10	0	0	0
2015–17	Hull F.C.	29	17	1	0	70
2015(loan)	→ Doncaster	7	1	1	0	6
2017(loan)	→ Leigh Centurions	6	4	0	0	16
	Total	53	32	2	0	92
- Source: As of 25 January 2018

Curtis Naughton (born 25 February 1995) is a professional rugby league footballer who last played for Hull F.C. in the Super League. He plays as a fullback or on the wing.

== Background ==
Naughton was born in Dewsbury, West Yorkshire, England.

== Playing career ==
=== Bradford ===
Naughton started his professional career with the Bradford Bulls, signing a three-year contract in November 2012. He made his first team début in the final game of the 2013 Super League season against the Huddersfield Giants. Despite having two years remaining on his contract, he left the club at the end of the season to move to Australia with his mother.

=== Sydney Roosters ===
In October 2013, Naughton signed a two-year contract with Sydney Roosters.

=== Hull ===
In October 2014, after spending a season playing for the Sydney Roosters' under-20s side, Naughton signed a one-year contract with Hull F.C. to return to the Super League. In May 2015, Naughton scored his first senior hat-trick for the club, as they beat the Castleford Tigers 40-14. This was followed by another hat-trick in August, this time against St. Helens at Langtree Park. In March 2016 Naughton signed a two-year contract extension that could keep him at the club until the end of 2018.

== Statistics ==
Statistics do not include pre-season friendlies.

Season	Appearance	Tries	Goals	Drop Goals	Points
2013 Bradford	1	0	0	0	0
2015 Hull	13	9	0	0	36
2016 Hull	16	8	0	0	32
Total	29	17	0	0	68

Leigh Centurions 2017
