= Jobe Murphy =

Ireland international rugby league footballer

Personal information
- Full name: John Benjamin Murphy
- Born: 16 October 1992 (age 33) Huddersfield, West Yorkshire, England

Playing information
- Height: 5 ft 10 in (1.78 m)
- Weight: 14 st 11 lb (94 kg)
- Position: Second-row
Club
Years	Team	Pld	T	G	FG	P
2013	Bradford Bulls	4	0	0	0	0
2013–14	Dewsbury Rams	20	0	0	0	0
	Total	24	0	0	0	0
Representative
Years	Team	Pld	T	G	FG	P
2014	Ireland	3	1	0	0	4

John Benjamin "Jobe" Murphy (born 16 October 1992 in Huddersfield, England) is a former rugby league footballer who played primarily as a second-row. He played for the Bradford Bulls in the Super League and for the Dewsbury Rams. He also represented Ireland at international level.

== Bradford Bulls ==
2012 - 2012 Season

Murphy featured on the bench in the pre-season games against Castleford Tigers and Dewsbury Rams. He was promoted to a starting second row spot in the friendly against Keighley Cougars.

2013 - 2013 Season

Murphy featured in the two pre-season friendlies against Dewsbury Rams and Leeds Rhinos.

He made his début in Round 3 (Castleford Tigers). He featured in three consecutive games from Round 6 (Widnes Vikings) to Round 8 (Catalans Dragons). He was released at the end of the season.

== Dewsbury Rams ==
Murphy was dual registered with Dewsbury Rams for the 2013 season. He featured against Whitehaven, Halifax, Sheffield Eagles and Swinton Lions.

At the end of the 2014 season, Jobe played for Ireland in the 2014 European Cup tournament.

In early pre-season 2015, Jobe failed to show up to trainings and therefore had his contract terminated by head coach Glenn Morrison. It was found out he 'privately' quit rugby league due to increased work commitments.

== Statistics ==
Season	Appearances	Tries	Goals	F/G	Points
2013 Bradford Bulls	4	0	0	0	0
2013 Dewsbury Rams	4	0	0	0	0
2014 Dewsbury Rams	16	0	0	0	0
Total	24	0	0	0	0
