= Omar Khan (businessman) =

British entrepreneur (born 1959)

- Born: 15 January 1959 (age 67); Bradford, West Yorkshire, England
- Occupation: Entrepreneur
- Known for: Omar Khan's restaurant Bradford Bulls

Omar Khan (born 15 January 1959) is a British entrepreneur best known for the Indian restaurant chain of the same name and as the owner of the Bradford Bulls rugby league club.

Khan has also been noted for his community and philanthropic work in his home city of Bradford. He is no longer a part of the Bulls due to ill health and old age. Khan is of Pakistani origin.

== Career ==
=== Omar Khan's Restaurant ===
Khan initially opened his Bradford restaurant in 1984, under the name Shah Jehan as owner and head chef, later moving to larger premises in the centre of Bradford and shifting to Omar Khan's to avoid name confusion. Over the years the restaurant has garnered several accolades including the Best in Britain Award in 1997, 98 and 99 award presented by the real curry restaurant guide. Omar Khan was also awarded the Hot Stuff Chef Of the Year 1994/95 by TAARO and Housing & Environmental

Over the years Omar Khan's has hosted several celebrities and political figures including Frank Bruno, Trevor McDonald, Tony Blair, and Ed Miliband.

In 2011, a second branch of the restaurant opened in Skipton.

=== Bradford Bulls ===
On 31 August 2012, as the sole director of OK Bulls Limited and with the support of Labour MP and former sports minister Gerry Sutcliffe, Khan purchased the Rugby League club. Joint administrator Brendan Guilfoyle announced the sale stating, "My main duty as administrator is to get the best return for creditors - and this was the best deal on the table. Omar Khan has also passed the Rugby Football League's test as being a 'fit and proper person' to run a rugby club as well as being a passionate fan of the Bulls."

Since taking on ownership, Khan has announced ambitious plans to transform Odsal Stadium into the "Wembley of the North."

=== Link Motion Inc (NQ Mobile) ===
In 24 October 2013, Muddy Waters released a report on NQ Mobile, a Chinese-based cybersecurity and mobile application company. Muddy Waters's research report claimed NQ Mobile had "fictitious" customers and revenues. In April 2015, the co-CEO of NQ Mobile, Omar Khan, stepped down after the stock had fallen nearly 84 percent.

=== Community and philanthropic work ===
Khan is engaged in several ventures aimed at benefiting the community in Bradford, such as OK In The Community which helps provide housing, independent living, and support services to people with learning disabilities, physical disabilities, and mental health issues and the OK Academy, which provides training for unemployed and disadvantaged youngsters.

Khan also supports several local, national, and international charities. In 2005, he helped raise £35,000 for the Telegraph & Argus South Asian Earthquake Appeal

In 2009, Khan was appointed as Asian ambassador for Bradford City football club.
