= Brett Kearney =

Australian rugby league footballer

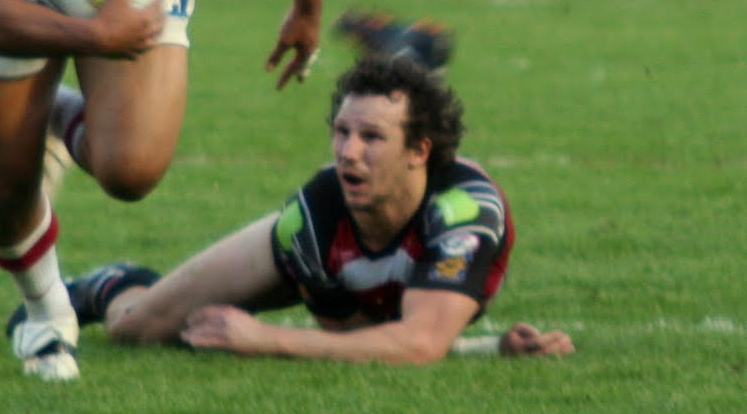

Personal information
- Full name: Brett Kearney
- Born: 29 September 1983 (age 41); Sydney, New South Wales, Australia

Playing information
- Height: 178 cm (5 ft 10 in)
- Weight: 80 kg (12 st 8 lb)
- Position: Fullback, Five-eighth, Halfback, Hooker
Club
Years	Team	Pld	T	G	FG	P
2003–05	South Sydney	28	5	0	0	20
2006–09	Cronulla Sharks	49	20	0	0	80
2010–14	Bradford Bulls	112	59	0	0	236
	Total	189	84	0	0	336
Representative
Years	Team	Pld	T	G	FG	P
2008	NSW Country	1	0	0	0	0

Brett Kearney (born 29 September 1983 in Sydney, New South Wales), also known by his initials "BK", is an Australian professional rugby league footballer formerly with the Bradford Bulls in the Super League, now currently playing for the Collegians in the Illawarra Rugby League competition. A utility back, he has represented Country Origin and previously played for the South Sydney Rabbitohs and Cronulla.

== Biography ==
=== Early career ===
Kearney's Junior Club was the Kincumber Colts, on the Central Coast. Kearney was recruited to play with the North Sydney Bears in the Harold Matthews Cup and S.G. Ball Cup before he moved on to South Sydney in 2003.

=== 2003-2005 ===
Kearney made his First Grade Debut in round 1 of the 2003 NRL season for South Sydney against the Canterbury-Bankstown Bulldogs at Telstra Stadium. Kearney made a total of 28 appearances for South Sydney as the club struggled towards the bottom of the table, finishing last in 2003 and 2004.

=== 2006-2014 ===
Signing with the Cronulla-Sutherland Sharks, Kearney had limited opportunity in 2006, with the exception of injuries. In 2007, with a positional change to fullback, Kearney was a regular in the first grade side until he suffered injury during the season. At fullback, "BK" made inroads in attack, scoring several tries. He scored a superb hat trick in the 2007 game against St. George Illawarra Dragons, showing his ability in attack. In 2008, Kearney was selected to play in the annual City vs Country match. At club level, Kearney made 20 appearances for Cronulla in the 2008 NRL season and scored 10 tries as the club reached the preliminary final but were defeated 28-0 by Melbourne at the Sydney Football Stadium.

In the 2009 NRL season, Kearney suffered a season-ending injury in round 1.

In 2010, he joined Super League club Bradford. After featuring for the at stand-off at the start of his Bulls career he was shifted to his natural position of full back midway through the 2010 season. After Mick Potter took over, Kearney featured almost exclusively as a full back in 2011.

In 2011, Kearney signed a new three-year deal with Bradford.

=== Return to Australia ===
In 2015, following five seasons in the Super League, Kearney returned to Australia after being linked to Illawarra Coal League team, the Collegians.

In 2018, Kearney returned to his junior club, the Kincumber Colts.

The table below shows the year-by-year breakdown of Kearney's time with the Bradford Bulls:

Season	Appearance	Tries	Goals	F/G	Points
2010 Bradford Bulls	25	14	0	0	56
2011 Bradford Bulls	21	7	0	0	28
2012 Bradford Bulls	22	15	0	0	60
2013 Bradford Bulls	22	15	0	0	60
2014 Bradford Bulls	22	8	0	0	32
Total	112	59	0	0	236

(For 2014 Super League season highlights, stats and results click on 2014 Super League season results)

In 2023, the Brain Foundation announced the appointment of Kearney as an ambassador.
