= Chev Walker =

Former GB & England international rugby league & union footballer

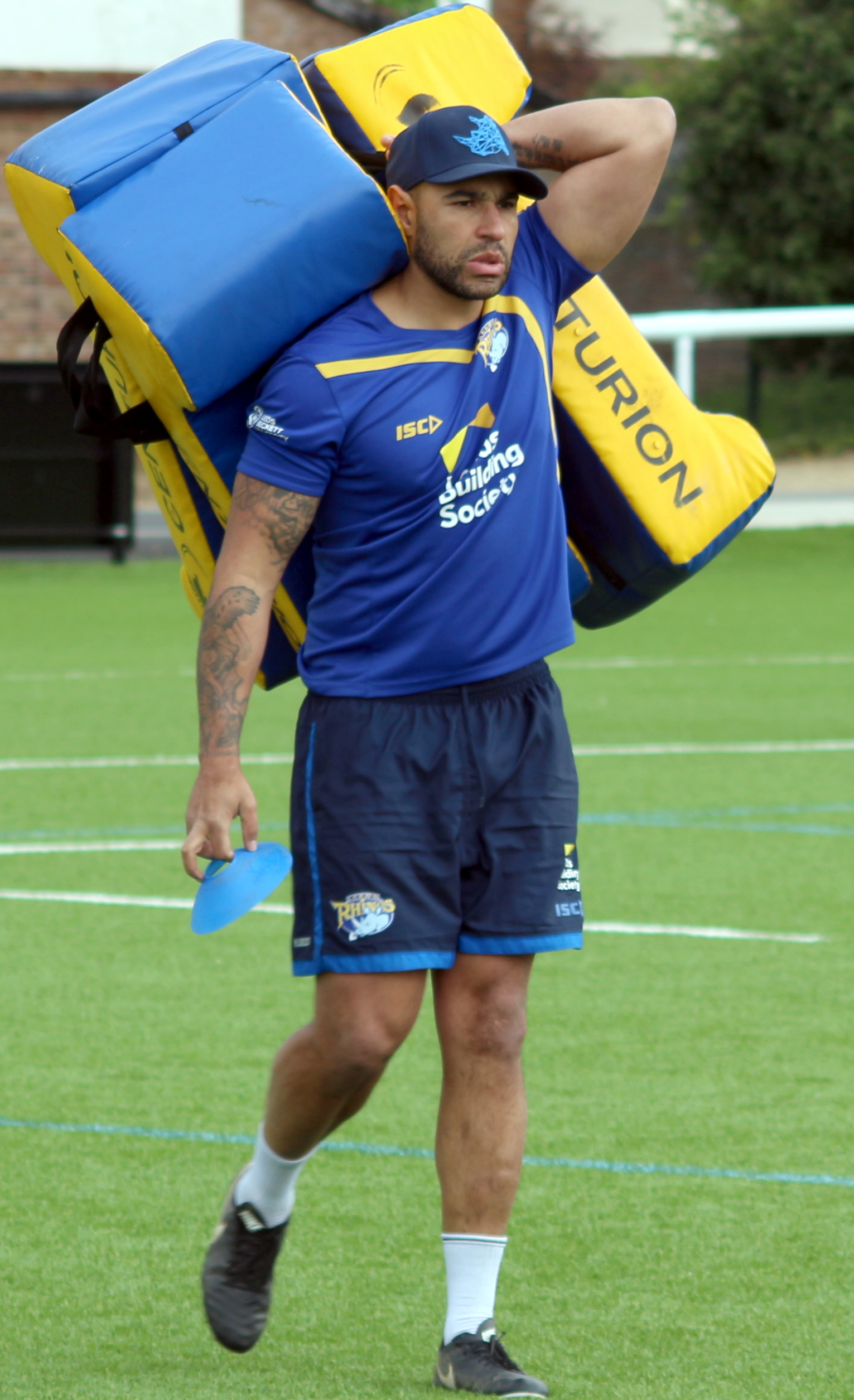

Personal information
- Full name: Naphtali Walker
- Born: 9 October 1982 (age 43) Leeds, West Yorkshire, England

Playing information
- Height: 6 ft 3 in (1.91 m)
- Weight: 16 st 5 lb (104 kg)

Rugby league
- Position: Wing, Centre, Second-row, Loose forward
Club
Years	Team	Pld	T	G	FG	P
1999–06	Leeds Rhinos	183	86	0	0	344
2008–10	Hull Kingston Rovers	34	5	0	0	20
2011–15	Bradford Bulls	84	8	0	0	32
	Total	301	99	0	0	396
Representative
Years	Team	Pld	T	G	FG	P
2001–03	Yorkshire	2	0	0	0	0
2000–01	England	6	2	0	0	8
2004–05	Great Britain	6	1	0	0	4

Rugby union
- Position: Centre
Club
Years	Team	Pld	T	G	FG	P
2006–07	Bath	8	0	0	0	0
Representative
Years	Team	Pld	T	G	FG	P
2007	England Saxons

Coaching information
Club
Years	Team	Gms	W	D	L	W%
2024	Leeds Rhinos (interim)	3	2	0	1	67

Chev Walker (born 9 October 1982) is an English professional rugby league coach who is an assistant coach at the Leeds Rhinos in the Super League and a former professional rugby league footballer who last played for the Bradford Bulls in the Championship. He played both rugby league and rugby union as a professional. A Great Britain and England international representative centre, Walker played in the Super League for the Leeds Rhinos, Hull Kingston Rovers and the Bradford Bulls.

== Playing career ==
=== Leeds Rhinos ===
He played the position of centre for Leeds and he made his début against Halifax on 13 August 1999 aged 16.

In July 2003, Walker was found guilty of brawling in the street in Leeds, and was sent to a young offenders' institution for 18 months. The other offenders were Leeds teammates Ryan Bailey (sentenced to nine months' detention in a young offenders' institution) and Dwayne Barker (ordered to do 150 hours of community service) and Rochdale Hornets' Paul Owen (jailed for 15 months).

He is of Jamaican heritage and expressed a desire to represent the West Indies. Just after his 18th birthday Walker played for England in the 2000 Rugby League World Cup and made his Great Britain début in 2004, coming off the bench against Australia in the opening game of that year's Tri Nations competition. In total Walker has six caps for Great Britain and six for England. He also has representative league honours with England A, England Under-21s and Yorkshire.

Walker featured in the Rugby League Challenge Cup Final in 2003. He played for the Leeds club at centre in their 2004 Super League Grand Final victory against Bradford. As Super League IX champions, Leeds faced 2004 NRL season premiers, the Canterbury side in the 2005 World Club Challenge. Walker played at centre and scored a try in Leeds' 39–32 victory. Walker played for Leeds in the 2005 Challenge Cup Final at centre in their loss against Hull F.C. By the end of the 2005 season he had scored 75 tries in 156 appearances for Leeds, an average of almost one try every two games. He was also part of the Leeds team which won the 2005 World Club Challenge when Leeds defeated the Canterbury Bulldogs. He played for the Leeds Rhinos at centre in their 2005 Super League Grand Final loss against Bradford Bulls.

On 6 June 2006, it was announced that Walker had signed for the English rugby union team Bath RFC, and would join the club from the end of the Rugby League season in November 2006.

Chev returned to Leeds Rhinos in 2020 and is assistant head coach with Scott Grix under Rohan Smith.

On 19 Jun 2024 he jointly took over the head-coach role, with Scott Grix, as an interim measure, following the immediate departure of Rohan Smith. On 10 Jul 2024 he returned to his role as assistant coach once the appointment of Brad Arthur, for the remainder of the 2024 season, as new head coach was confirmed.

=== Rugby union ===
England's union coach, Brian Ashton, identified Walker as a player with international potential when he helped to sign him in his previous role at Bath but the 24-year-old centre struggled to settle after moving south from Leeds on a two-year contract, and made only eight Guinness Premiership starts.

Walker was linked with a return to rugby league with various clubs before signing for Hull Kingston Rovers in September 2007.

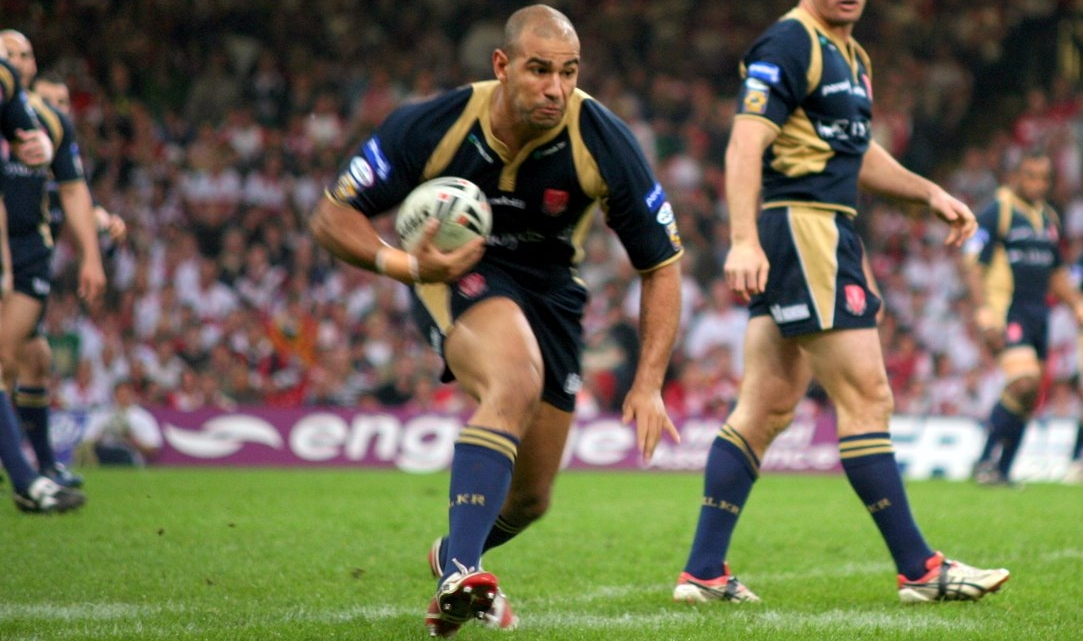
Walker playing for Hull KR

=== Hull Kingston Rovers ===
Walker began playing for Hull Kingston Rovers at the start of the 2008 Super League season. On 18 September 2009, Walker suffered a horrific compound leg fracture in the Super League title playoff against Champions Leeds. Bradford Bulls signed Walker on a one-year deal at the end of the 2010 season.

=== Bradford ===
Walker appeared in two of the four pre-season games. Walker played against Halifax and Wakefield Trinity. Walker featured in Round 1 (Leeds) to Round 3 (Crusaders). He then played in six consecutive games from Round 8 (Harlequins RL) to Round 13 (Warrington). He featured in Round 26 (Crusaders) and Round 27 (Wakefield Trinity). Walker also featured in the Challenge Cup game against Halifax. He picked up a pectoral injury which kept him out all season. Walker scored a try against Hull F.C. He signed a one-year extension to his contract.

Walker appeared in three of the four pre-season games. He played against Castleford, Dewsbury and Hull F.C. He scored a try against Castleford. Walker featured in three consecutive games from Round 1 (Catalans Dragons) to Round 3 (Wigan). He missed Rounds 4–5 due to an injury. He then featured in three consecutive games from Round 6 (Hull Kingston Rovers) to Round 8 (Salford). He missed Rounds 9–11 and Round 4 of the Challenge Cup due to injury. He featured in Round 15 (Leeds). He was then injured for Rounds 16–18. He returned for Rounds 19 (Wigan) to 27 (Catalans Dragons). Walker signed a one-year extension to his current contract to keep him at Odsal until the end of 2013.

Walker featured in the pre-season friendlies against Dewsbury and Leeds. He featured in six consecutive games from Round 1 (Wakefield Trinity Wildcats) to Round 6 (Widnes). Walker was injured for Round 7. Walker featured in Round 8 (Catalans Dragons) to Round 9 (Leeds Rhinos|Leeds). Walker missed Round 10 due to injury. Walker returned and played in Round 11 (London Broncos) to Round 17 (Hull Kingston Rovers). He was injured for Round 18–19. He returned in Round 20 (Warrington Wolves) and then in Round 23 (Wakefield Trinity Wildcats) to Round 26 (London Broncos). Walker featured in the Challenge Cup against Rochdale and the London Broncos. Walker signed a one-year extension to his contract with the option of another year midway through the season. Walker then signed a further one-year extension on his contract despite the Bradford club being relegated to the Championship. He was named captain for the 2015 season. Walker retired from professional rugby league at the end of the 2015 season.

Season	Appearance	Tries	Goals	F/G	Points
2011 Bradford	12	1	0	0	4
2012 Bradford	16	0	0	0	0
2013 Bradford	23	4	0	0	16
2014 Bradford	21	1	0	0	4
2015 Bradford	12	2	0	0	8
Total	84	8	0	0	32

== Personal ==
In November 2019, Chev & Lauren Walker appeared on George Clarke's TV programme Old House, New Home
