= Jamie Foster =

English rugby league footballer

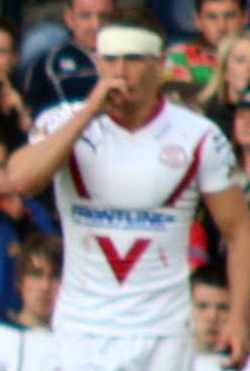

Personal information
- Full name: James Foster
- Born: 27 July 1990 (age 36) St Helens, Merseyside, England

Playing information

Rugby league
- Position: Centre, Wing, Fullback
Club
Years	Team	Pld	T	G	FG	P
2010–12	St Helens	54	34	241	0	618
2012(loan)	→ Hull F.C.	9	5	45	0	110
2013–14	Bradford Bulls	35	15	119	0	298
2016	Huddersfield Giants	3	2	5	0	18
2016	Featherstone Rovers	11	3	38	0	88
2018	Workington Town	6	0	26	0	52
	Total	118	59	474	0	1184

Rugby union
- Position: Centre, Back row
Club
Years	Team	Pld	T	G	FG	P
2015–16	Hull
- Source: As of 8 April 2018

Jamie Foster (born 27 July 1990) is an English former professional rugby league footballer who last played for Workington Town in League 1 in 2018. His position of preference is in the centres, but he has been known to convert to the wing or fullback.

Foster was also a recognised goalkicker. He signed from local amateur club Blackbrook Royals ARLFC. As of June 2014, Jamie lives in Newton-Le-Willows, not far from where he grew up in Haydock, St. Helens. He has played for the Huddersfield Giants in the Super League.

== St Helens RLFC ==
In the fourth round of the 2010 Challenge Cup, he finally made his first-grade début, after three years in reserve-grade rugby, playing on the wing in place of the injured Francis Meli, where he kicked eight goals from as many attempts in a 56–16 win over Toulouse Olympique. In his Super League début the week later, again deputising for Meli, Foster looked impressive once more with the boot scoring eight from eight in a 41–20 success over Leeds. His first failure with the boot only came in his third appearance, when, in a 54–0 Magic Weekend win over Hull Kingston Rovers, he kicked only two from six, whilst also scoring his maiden try for the club. He missed the cut for the Challenge Cup game against Harlequins RL, but thanks to a recurrence of Meli's injury, Foster returned for the 34–42 loss at Salford City Reds, in which he was brought off the field after ten minutes after a poor display defensively.

However, this did not end his run in the first team, as he started on the wing against Rovers in a 68–12 win, before being dropped for the loss at Hull FC. However, he returned to play on the right wing in a 24–22 win at home to Huddersfield, where he kicked five goals. The next week (in round 18) he was again on the wing for a 24–26 win over rivals Wigan Warriors, where he kicked three from five and scored a try. He missed three games with a calf knock but returned for Saints in a centre role against Wakefield that saw him kick seven goals from nine attempts. He was also part of beaten finalists St. Helens where Wigan Warriors won 22–10 in the 2010 Super League Grand Final.

At the start of the 2011 season, Foster scored 14 tries and 77 goals, a total of 210 points, in 13 appearances and three from the bench. His partnership with Francis Meli in the 2011 season was productive. In the first game of the 2011's Super League XVI St. Helens played Wigan in a repeat of the Super League final. In this game Saints were losing 16–0 at halftime and came back to draw 16–16 with Foster coming off the bench to kick two goals. Foster then kicked 8/10 against Salford City Reds in round 2. When Saints played Leeds, in Round 6, he scored two tries, including a round the back trick to score in the corner, and kicked five goals. In Round 12, he kicked a touchline goal to win the game for Saints against Castleford. In the Challenge Cup Fifth Round Foster kicked 11 out of 12 goals in a 70–0 thrashing of Featherstone Rovers.

Foster played in the 2011 Super League Grand Final defeat against Leeds at Old Trafford. Royce Simmons, the Saints coach, has said "Jamie Foster's ability to kick points is vital to the Saints. The way Foster can turn four points into six, he can break the heart of another side through that".

== Loan at Hull FC ==
Near the end of the 2012 Super League season, Foster spent a month on loan at Hull FC. His first game for the Black and Whites was against arch-rivals Hull Kingston Rovers, he helped his new side to a 32–18 win by kicking six goals. The week after he played in the 36–24 victory over Salford City Reds where he kicked 100% of his goals with seven goals from seven attempts. He was also part of the team which lost 48–10 to Wigan, Foster managed to get himself a goal in this game. Foster was on form the next week against the Catalans Dragons where he recorded his first try for Hull F.C. and also kicked five goals leading his team to a 30–10 win. However, this victory was short lived as the Black & Whites were soundly beaten 42–16 by newly promoted Widnes, Foster got himself on the scoreboard with two goals. He was a key member in Hull FC's record breaking 70–6 victory over his future club the Bradford Bulls, he helped his team to this huge win by contributing two tries and nine goals which meant Hull were secure in the playoffs. His last regular season game for Hull was in a 36–10 win over Castleford, Foster put in a fine display and kicked all six goals.

== Bradford Bulls ==
Foster signed for Super League side Bradford on a one-year deal.

2013 – 2013 Season

Foster featured at fullback for the pre-season friendlies against Dewsbury and Leeds. He featured in five consecutive games from Round 1 against the Wakefield Trinity Wildcats to Round 5 against Huddersfield. He was injured for Round 6. Foster featured in four consecutive games from Round 7 Hull Kingston Rovers to Round 10 against Salford. Foster was injured for Round 11–15 but returned for Round 16 Huddersfield. Foster missed Round 17–19 due to injury. He returned in Round 20 Warrington to Round 27 Huddersfield. Foster featured in the Challenge Cup against the Rochdale Hornets. He re-signed with the Bradford club for two years midway through the season.

2014 – 2014 Season

Foster featured in the pre-season games against Hull FC, Dewsbury and Castleford. He featured in Round 1 against Castleford to Round 5 against Huddersfield. Foster missed Rounds 6–7 due to injury. He featured in Round 8 against Salford then in Round 11 Warrington to Round 14 Catalans Dragons. He was injured for Round 15–19. Foster played in Round 20 St. Helens to Round 21 Huddersfield then in Round 24 Hull F.C. His final game for Bradford was in Round 27 against the London Broncos. Foster featured in Round 4 Oldham to Round 5 Catalans Dragons in the Challenge Cup.

== Statistics ==
Season	Appearances	Tries	Goals	F/G	Points
2010 St Helens	16	7	72	0	172
2011 St Helens	33	25	151	0	402
2012 St Helens	5	2	18	0	44
2012 Hull FC	9	5	45	0	110
2013 Bradford Bulls	19	5	69	0	158
2014 Bradford Bulls	16	10	50	0	140
2016 Huddersfield Giants	3	2	5	0	18
Total	101	56	410	0	1,044
