= 2010 Bradford Bulls season =

Rugby league season

- Super League XV Rank: 10th
- Play-off result: Did not qualify
- Challenge Cup: Quarter-final
- 2010 record: Wins: 11; draws: 1; losses: 18
- Points scored: For: 658; against: 770

Team information
- Chairman: Peter Hood
- Head coach: Lee St Hilaire (was Steve McNamara)
- Captain: Andy Lynch
- Stadium: Odsal Stadium
- Avg. attendance: 7,982
- High attendance: 11,995 vs. Leeds Rhinos

Top scorers
- Tries: Brett Kearney & Steve Menzies (14)
- Goals: Paul Sykes (48)
- Points: Paul Sykes (114)
← 2009	List of seasons	2011 →

This article details the Bradford Bulls rugby league football club's 2010 season, the fifteenth season of the Super League era.

== 2010 Milestones ==
- Round 1: Brett Kearney, Matt Orford, Heath L'Estrange and Glenn Hall made their debuts for the Bulls.
- Round 2: Matt Orford scored his 1st try and kicked his 1st goal for the Bulls.
- Round 3: Brett Kearney scored his 1st try for the Bulls.
- Round 3: Matt Orford kicked his 1st drop goal for the Bulls.
- Round 4: Paul Sykes kicked his 1st drop goal for the Bulls.
- Round 5: Glenn Hall scored his 1st try for the Bulls.
- Round 10: Michael Platt scored his 25th try and reached 100 points for the Bulls.
- Round 11: Rikki Sheriffe scored his 1st hat-trick for the Bulls.
- CCR4: Heath L'Estrange scored his 1st try for the Bulls.
- CCR4: Danny Addy made his debut for the Bulls.
- CCR4: Danny Addy scored his 1st try and kicked his 1st goal for the Bulls.
- CCR5: Chris Nero scored his 2nd hat-trick for the Bulls.
- CCR5: Glenn Hall kicked his 1st goal for the Bulls.
- Round 14: Chris Nero scored his 25th try and reached 100 points for the Bulls.
- Round 14: Paul Sykes reached 200 points for the Bulls.
- CCQF: Joe Wardle made his debut for the Bulls.
- Round 17: Steve Crossley made his debut for the Bulls.
- Round 17: Dave Halley scored his 25th try and reached 100 points for the Bulls.
- Round 18: Cain Southernwood made his debut for the Bulls.
- Round 21: Steve Crossley scored his 1st try for the Bulls.
- Round 22: Vinny Finigan made his debut for the Bulls.
- Round 22: Vinny Finigan scored his 1st try for the Bulls.
- Round 22: Steve Menzies scored his 25th try and reached 100 points for the Bulls.
- Round 24: Tom Olbison scored his 1st try for the Bulls.

== Pre Season Friendlies ==
LEGEND
Win
Draw
Loss

Bulls score is first.

Date	Competition	Vrs	H/A	Venue	Result	Score	Tries	Goals	Attendance
26 December 2009	Pre Season	Castleford Tigers	A	The Jungle	W	26–16	Halley, Whitehead, Straugheir, Horton (2)	Addy 1/3, Hyde 2/2	2,900 (Est.)
17 January 2010	Pre Season	Leeds Rhinos	A	Headingley Stadium	L	10–12	Sykes, Reardon	Sykes 1/2	5,800 (Est.)
22 January 2010	Pre Season	Dewsbury Rams	A	Rams Stadium	D	24–24	Hall, Kopczak, Godwin, Whitehead	Sykes 1/1, Donaldson 2/2, Hyde 1/1	1,000 (Est.)
28 January 2010	Pre Season	Hull Kingston Rovers	A	New Craven Park	W	18–16	Worrincy, Reardon, Whitehead	Sykes 3/3	1,100 (Est.)

== Table ==
Pos	Team	Pld	W	D	L	PF	PA	PD	Pts	Qualification
1	Wigan Warriors (L, C)	27	22	0	5	922	411	+511	44	Play-offs
2	St Helens	27	20	0	7	946	547	+399	40	Play-offs
3	Warrington Wolves	27	20	0	7	885	488	+397	40	Play-offs
4	Leeds Rhinos	27	17	1	9	725	561	+164	35	Play-offs
5	Huddersfield Giants	27	16	1	10	758	439	+319	33	Play-offs
6	Hull F.C.	27	16	0	11	569	584	−15	32	Play-offs
7	Hull Kingston Rovers	27	14	1	12	653	632	+21	29	Play-offs
8	Celtic Crusaders	27	12	0	15	547	732	−185	24	Play-offs
9	Castleford Tigers	27	11	0	16	648	766	−118	22	
10	Bradford Bulls	27	9	1	17	528	728	−200	19	
11	Wakefield Trinity Wildcats	27	9	0	18	539	741	−202	18	
12	Salford City Reds	27	8	0	19	448	857	−409	16	
13	Harlequins	27	7	0	20	494	838	−344	14	
14	Catalans Dragons	27	6	0	21	409	747	−338	12	

Source: Rugby League Project
Rules for classification: 1) Points; 2) Points difference; 3) Number of points scored;
(C) Champions; (L) League Leaders' Shield Winners

== 2010 Fixtures and Results ==
LEGEND
Win
Draw
Loss

2010 Engage Super League

Date	Competition	Rnd	Vrs	H/A	Venue	Result	Score	Tries	Goals	Att	TV	Report
5 February 2010	Super League XV	1	Huddersfield Giants	A	Galpharm Stadium	L	12-24	Reardon (2), Sheriffe	Orford 0/1, Sykes 0/2	9,774	Sky Sports	Report
14 February 2010	Super League XV	2	St. Helens	H	Odsal Stadium	L	6-38	Orford	Orford 1/1	10,165	-	Report
19 February 2010	Super League XV	3	Castleford Tigers	H	Odsal Stadium	W	41-22	Kearney (2), Halley, Scruton, Sheriffe, Sykes, Whitehead	Orford 6/7, Orford 1 DG	8,019	Sky Sports	Report
26 February 2010	Super League XV	4	Salford City Reds	A	The Willows	W	7-0	Menzies	Orford 1/2, Sykes 1 DG	3,806	-	Report
5 March 2010	Super League XV	5	Wigan Warriors	H	Odsal Stadium	W	22-20	Orford (2), Hall, Kearney	Orford 3/4	9,244	Sky Sports	Report
13 March 2010	Super League XV	6	Warrington Wolves	A	Halliwell Jones Stadium	L	8-33	Lynch, Sykes	Orford 0/2, Sykes 0/1	10,434	Sky Sports	Report
19 March 2010	Super League XV	7	Hull F.C.	A	KC Stadium	L	6-18	Reardon	Sykes 1/1, Godwin 0/1	14,466	-	Report
26 March 2010	Super League XV	8	Harlequins RL	H	Odsal Stadium	W	19-12	Kearney, Menzies, Platt	Orford 3/4, Orford 1 DG	7,153	-	Report
1 April 2010	Super League XV	9	Leeds Rhinos	A	Headingley Stadium	D	20-20	Nero (2), Halley, Menzies	Orford 2/5	17,244	Sky Sports	Report
5 April 2010	Super League XV	10	Crusaders RL	H	Odsal Stadium	W	20-16	Hall, Halley, Nero, Platt	Orford 2/4, Sykes 0/1	7,853	-	Report
10 April 2010	Super League XV	11	Catalans Dragons	A	Stade Aimé Giral	W	36-14	Sheriffe (3), Kearney, Lynch, Menzies	Orford 5/7, Sykes 1/1	8,884	-	Report
25 April 2010	Super League XV	12	Hull Kingston Rovers	H	Odsal Stadium	W	40-4	Kearney (2), Sheriffe (2), Lynch, Whitehead	Orford 8/8	9,234	-	Report
1 May 2010	Magic Weekend	13	Crusaders RL	N	Murrayfield Stadium	L	0-19	-	-	26,642	Sky Sports	Report
14 May 2010	Super League XV	14	Wakefield Trinity Wildcats	A	Belle Vue	W	29-10	Nero (2), Godwin, L'Estrange, Menzies	Sykes 4/6, Sykes 1 DG	5,381	Sky Sports	Report
23 May 2010	Super League XV	15	Leeds Rhinos	H	Odsal Stadium	L	12-26	Platt, Whitehead	Sykes 2/3	11,995	Sky Sports	Report
6 June 2010	Super League XV	16	Huddersfield Giants	H	Odsal Stadium	L	6-52	Menzies	Sykes 1/1	8,156	-	Report
13 June 2010	Super League XV	17	Crusaders RL	A	Racecourse Ground	L	20-44	Halley, Nero, Whitehead, Worrincy	Sykes 2/4	2,979	Sky Sports	Report
19 June 2010	Super League XV	18	Warrington Wolves	H	Odsal Stadium	L	28-40	Halley, Kearney, L'Estrange, Menzies, Nero	Sykes 4/5	8,128	Sky Sports	Report
27 June 2010	Super League XV	19	Castleford Tigers	A	The Jungle	L	22-28	Kearney, Menzies, Platt, Whitehead	Sykes 3/4	5,482	-	Report
4 July 2010	Super League XV	20	Hull F.C.	H	Odsal Stadium	L	22-28	Nero (2), Addy, Kearney	Sykes 3/4	8,411	-	Report
9 July 2010	Super League XV	21	Harlequins RL	A	Twickenham Stoop	L	18-35	Crossley, Sykes, Whitehead	Sykes 3/3	3,152	-	Report
18 July 2010	Super League XV	22	Salford City Reds	H	Odsal Stadium	L	26-30	Finigan (2), Menzies, Reardon, Whitehead	Addy 3/5	6,382	-	Report
24 July 2010	Super League XV	23	Hull Kingston Rovers	A	Craven Park	L	24-49	Finigan (2), Kopczak, L'Estrange, Reardon	Addy 2/5	7,854	Sky Sports	Report
1 August 2010	Super League XV	24	Catalans Dragons	H	Odsal Stadium	L	22-24	Lynch, Menzies, Olbison, Platt	Sykes 3/4	6,217	-	Report
13 August 2010	Super League XV	25	St. Helens	A	Knowsley Road	L	12-60	Sheriffe, Worrincy	Sykes 2/2	9,032	-	Report
21 August 2010	Super League XV	26	Wakefield Trinity Wildcats	H	Odsal Stadium	W	38-28	Godwin (2), Kearney, Lynch, Menzies, Whitehead	Sykes 7/7	7,437	-	Report
3 September 2010	Super League XV	27	Wigan Warriors	A	DW Stadium	L	12-34	Kopczak, Lynch	Sykes 1/1, Menzies 1/1	17,058	-	Report

== Player Appearances ==
- Super League Only

FB=Fullback	C=Centre	W=Winger	SO=Stand-off	SH=Scrum half	PR=Prop	H=Hooker	SR=Second Row	L=Loose forward	B=Bench

No	Player	1	2	3	4	5	6	7	8	9	10	11	12	13	14	15	16	17	18	19	20	21	22	23	24	25	26	27
1	Dave Halley	FB	FB	FB	FB	FB	FB	FB		W	W	W	W	W	FB	FB	FB	FB	W	W		W		FB	FB	FB	FB	
2	Rikki Sheriffe	W	W	W	W		W	W	W		W	W	W	W	W	W	W	W	W	W	W	W	W		W	W	W	W
3	Paul Sykes	C	C	C	C	C	C	SO	SO	SO	SO	SO	SO	SO	SO	SO	SO	SO	SO	SO	SO	SO	Red card	Red card	SH	SH	C	C
4	Chris Nero	C	C	C	C	C	C	C	C	C	C	C	C	C	C	C	C	C	C	C	C	C	C	C	C			
5	Stuart Reardon	W	W	W	W	W	W	W	W	W					W	W	W	W			W		W	W				
6	Brett Kearney	SO	SO	SO	SO	SO	SO	SH	FB	FB	FB	FB	FB	FB	SH			SH	FB	FB	FB	FB	SO			SO	SO	SO
7	Matt Orford	SH	SH	SH	SH	SH	SH		SH	SH	SH	SH	SH	SH														
8	Nick Scruton	P	P	P	P	P	P	P	P	P	P	P	P	P	P	P	P	P	P							B	P	P
9	Heath L'Estrange	H	H	H	H	H	H	H	H	H	H	H	H	H	H	SH	SH	H	H	H	SH	H	H	H	H	H	H	SH
10	Andy Lynch	P	P	P	P	P	P	P	P	P	P	P	P	P	P	P	P			P	P	P	P	P	P	P	P	P
11	Steve Menzies	L	L	L	L	L	L	L	L	L	L	L	L	L	L	L	L	L	C	L	L	L	L	SO	SO	C	L	C
12	Glenn Hall	SR	B	B	B	B	SR	B	B	B	B	B	B	B	B	B	SR	P	P	P	P	B	B	B	B			B
13	Jamie Langley	SR	SR	SR	SR	SR		SR	SR	SR	SR	SR								SR	SR	SR	SR	L	SR	L	SR	L
14	Wayne Godwin	B	B	B	B	B	B	B	B	B	B	B	B	B	B	H	H	B	L	B	H	B	B	B	L	B	B	H
15	Michael Platt	x	x	x	x	x	x	C	C	C	C	C	C		C	C	C			C	C	C	C	C	C	C	C	FB
16	Michael Worrincy	B	B	B	x	B	B				B		B	B	SR	B	B	SR	SR	B	SR	B	B	SR	B	SR	SR	SR
17	Danny Sculthorpe																											
18	Craig Kopczak	B	B	B	B	B	B	B	B	B		B	B	B	B	B	B	B	B	B	B	P	P	P	P	P	B	B
19	Jason Crookes	x	x	x	x	W	x	x	x	x	x	x	x	C	x	x	x	x	x	x	x	x	x	x	x	W	W	x
20	Elliott Whitehead	x	SR	SR	SR	SR	SR	SR	SR	SR	SR	SR	SR	SR	SR	SR	SR	SR	SR	SR	B	SR	SR	SR	SR	SR	B	SR
22	James Donaldson	B	x	x	B	x	B	B	B	B	B	B	SR	SR	B	SR												
23	Steve Crossley	x	x	x	x	x	x	x	x	x	x	x	x	x	x	x	x	B	B	x	B	B	B	B	B			
24	Tom Olbison	x	x	x	x	x	x	x	x	x	x	x	x	x	x	x	x	x	B	x	x	x	x	B	B	B	B	B
29	Joe Wardle	x	x	x	x	x	x	x	x	x	x	x	x	x	x	x	B	C	x	x	x	x	x	x	x	x	x	x
31	Cain Southernwood	x	x	x	x	x	x	x	x	x	x	x	x	x	x	x	x	x	SH	SH								
32	Danny Addy	x	x	x	x	x	x	x	x	x	x	x	x	x	x	B	B	B	B	B	B	SH	SH	SH			SH	B
33	Vinny Finigan	x	x	x	x	x	x	x	x	x	x	x	x	x	x	x	x	x	x	x	x	x	FB	W	W	B	x	W

= Injured

= Suspended

== Challenge Cup ==
LEGEND
Win
Draw
Loss

Date	Competition	Rnd	Vrs	H/A	Venue	Result	Score	Tries	Goals	Att	TV	Report
18 April 2010	Cup	4th	Dewsbury Rams	A	Rams Stadium	W	50-0	Hall (2), Kearney (2), Addy, Godwin, L'Estrange, Scruton, Whitehead	Orford 5/7, Addy 2/2	3,995	-	Report
8 May 2010	Cup	5th	Leigh Centurions	H	Odsal Stadium	W	58-16	Nero (3), Menzies (2), Godwin, Hall, Kearney, Sykes, Worrincy	Sykes 8/9, Hall 1/1	4,250	-	Report
30 May 2010	Cup	QF	Warrington Wolves	H	Odsal Stadium	L	22-26	Halley, Menzies, Nero, Sheriffe	Sykes 3/4	7,092	BBC Sport	Report

== Player appearances ==
FB=Fullback	C=Centre	W=Winger	SO=Stand Off	SH=Scrum half	P=Prop	H=Hooker	SR=Second Row	L=Loose forward	B=Bench

No	Player	4th	5th	QF
1	Dave Halley	FB	FB	FB
2	Rikki Sheriffe	W	W	W
3	Paul Sykes	x	SO	SO
4	Chris Nero	x	C	C
5	Stuart Reardon		W	
6	Brett Kearney	SO	SH	
7	Matt Orford	SH		SH
8	Nick Scruton	P	P	P
9	Heath L'Estrange	B	H	H
10	Andy Lynch		P	P
11	Steve Menzies	C	C	C
12	Glenn Hall	P	L	SR
13	Jamie Langley	L		
14	Wayne Godwin	H	B	B
15	Michael Platt	C	B	W
16	Michael Worrincy	SR	SR	B
17	Danny Sculthorpe			
18	Craig Kopczak	B	B	B
19	Jason Crookes	W	x	x
20	Elliott Whitehead	SR	SR	SR
22	James Donaldson	x	B	L
23	Steve Crossley	x	x	x
24	Tom Olbison	B	x	x
29	Joe Wardle	x	x	B
31	Cain Southernwood	x	x	x
32	Danny Addy	B	x	x
33	Vinny Finigan	x	x	x

== 2010 squad statistics ==
- Appearances and Points include (Super League, Challenge Cup and Play-offs) as of 3 September 2010.

No	Player	Position	Age	Previous club	Apps	Tries	Goals	DG	Points
1	Dave Halley	fullback	N/A	Bradford Bulls Academy	26	6	0	0	24
2	Rikki Sheriffe	wing	N/A	Harlequins RL	27	9	0	0	36
3	Paul Sykes	centre	N/A	Harlequins RL	27	4	48	2	114
4	Chris Nero	centre	N/A	Huddersfield Giants	26	13	0	0	52
5	Stuart Reardon	wing	N/A	Warrington Wolves	17	5	0	0	20
6	Brett Kearney	stand-off	N/A	Cronulla Sharks	25	14	0	0	56
7	Matt Orford	scrum-half	N/A	Manly Sea Eagles	14	3	36	2	86
8	Nick Scruton	prop	N/A	Leeds Rhinos	24	2	0	0	8
9	Heath L'Estrange	hooker	N/A	Manly Sea Eagles	30	4	0	0	16
10	Andy Lynch	prop	N/A	Castleford Tigers	27	6	0	0	24
11	Steve Menzies	second-row	N/A	Manly Sea Eagles	30	14	1	0	58
12	Glenn Hall	second-row	N/A	Manly Sea Eagles	28	5	1	0	22
13	Jamie Langley	loose forward	N/A	Bradford Bulls Academy	20	0	0	0	0
14	Wayne Godwin	hooker	N/A	Hull F.C.	30	5	0	0	20
15	Michael Platt	fullback	N/A	Castleford Tigers	21	5	0	0	20
16	Michael Worrincy	second-row	N/A	Harlequins RL	25	3	0	0	12
17	Danny Sculthorpe	prop	N/A	Wakefield Trinity Wildcats	0	0	0	0	0
18	Craig Kopczak	prop	N/A	Bradford Bulls Academy	29	2	0	0	8
19	Jason Crookes	centre	N/A	Bradford Bulls Academy	5	0	0	0	0
20	Elliott Whitehead	second-row	N/A	Bradford Bulls Academy	29	9	0	0	36
22	James Donaldson	loose forward	N/A	Bradford Bulls Academy	14	0	0	0	0
23	Steve Crossley	prop	N/A	Bradford Bulls Academy	7	1	0	0	4
24	Tom Olbison	second-row	N/A	Bradford Bulls Academy	7	1	0	0	4
29	Joe Wardle	centre	N/A	Bradford Bulls Academy	3	0	0	0	0
31	Cain Southernwood	scrum-half	N/A	Wakefield Trinity Wildcats	2	0	0	0	0
32	Danny Addy	loose forward	N/A	Bradford Bulls Academy	12	2	7	0	22
33	Vinny Finigan	wing	N/A	Bradford Bulls Academy	5	4	0	0	16

= Injured = Suspended

== 2010 transfers in/out ==
In

Name	Position	Signed from	Date
Glenn Hall	Second Row	Manly Sea Eagles	June 2009
Heath L'Estrange	hooker	Manly Sea Eagles	July 2009
Brett Kearney	Stand Off	Cronulla Sharks	October 2009
Stuart Reardon	Winger	Hull FC	October 2009
Danny Sculthorpe	prop	Wakefield Trinity Wildcats	October 2009
Matt Orford	Scrum-half	Manly Sea Eagles	November 2009
Cain Southernwood	Scrum-half	Wakefield Trinity Wildcats	April 2010

Out

Name	Position	Club Signed	Date
Terry Newton	hooker	Wakefield Trinity Wildcats	July 2009
Glenn Morrison	Second Row	Wakefield Trinity Wildcats	July 2009
Ben Jeffries	Stand Off	Wakefield Trinity Wildcats	September 2009
David Solomona	Second Row	Warrington Wolves	September 2009
Matt Cook	Second Row	Hull Kingston Rovers	September 2009
Matt James	prop	Harlequins RL	September 2009
Semi Tadulala	wing	Rugby Union	September 2009
Sam Burgess	prop	South Sydney Rabbitohs	September 2009
Paul Deacon	Scrum-half	Wigan Warriors	November 2009
Kieran Hyde	Scrum-half	Wakefield Trinity Wildcats	April 2010
