= 2009 Bradford Bulls season =

- Super League XIV Rank: 9th
- Play-off result: Did not qualify
- Challenge Cup: 4th round
- 2009 record: Wins: 12; draws: 1; losses: 15
- Points scored: For: 691; against: 708

Team information
- Chairman: Peter Hood
- Head Coach: Steve McNamara
- Captain: Paul Deacon
- Stadium: Odsal Stadium
- Avg. attendance: 9,677
- High attendance: 14,554 vs. Leeds Rhinos

Top scorers
- Tries: Semi Tadulala (14)
- Goals: Paul Deacon (91)
- Points: Paul Deacon (201)
← 2008	List of seasons	2010 →

This article details the Bradford Bulls rugby league football club's 2009 season, the 14th season of the Super League era.

== 2009 Milestones ==
- Round 4: Steve Menzies and Rikki Sheriffe scored their 1st tries for the Bulls.
- Round 5: Semi Tadulala scored his 25th try and reached 100 points for the Bulls.
- Round 6: Terry Newton scored his 25th try and reached 100 points for the Bulls.
- Round 8: Michael Worrincy scored his 1st try for the Bulls.
- Round 9: Paul Sykes reached 100 points for the Bulls.
- Round 11: Craig Kopczak scored his 1st try for the Bulls.
- Round 12: Paul Sykes scored his 1st hat-trick for the Bulls.
- Round 14: Paul Sykes scored his 25th try for the Bulls.
- Round 15: Julien Rinaldi scored his 1st try for the Bulls.
- Round 17: Paul Deacon reached 2,500 points for the Bulls.
- Round 19: Nick Scruton scored his 1st try for the Bulls.
- Round 21: James Donaldson scored his 1st try for the Bulls.
- Round 22: Elliott Whitehead scored his 1st try for the Bulls.
- Round 22: Paul Deacon kicked his 1,100th goal for the Bulls.
- Round 2: Dave Halley scored his 2nd hat-trick for the Bulls.
- Round 25: Paul Deacon scored his 75th try for the Bulls.
- Round 26: Chris Nero scored his 1st hat-trick for the Bulls.
- Round 27: Paul Deacon reached 2,600 points for the Bulls.

== Table ==
Pos	Team	Pld	W	D	L	PF	PA	PD	Pts	Qualification
1	Leeds Rhinos (L, C)	27	21	0	6	805	453	+352	42	Play-offs
2	St Helens	27	19	0	8	733	466	+267	38	Play-offs
3	Huddersfield Giants	27	18	0	9	690	416	+274	36	Play-offs
4	Hull Kingston Rovers	27	17	1	9	650	516	+134	35	Play-offs
5	Wakefield Trinity Wildcats	27	16	0	11	685	609	+76	32	Play-offs
6	Wigan Warriors	27	15	0	12	659	551	+108	30	Play-offs
7	Castleford Tigers	27	14	0	13	645	702	−57	28	Play-offs
8	Catalans Dragons	27	13	0	14	613	660	−47	26	Play-offs
9	Bradford Bulls	27	12	1	14	653	668	−15	25	
10	Warrington Wolves	27	12	0	15	649	705	−56	24	
11	Harlequins	27	11	0	16	591	691	−100	22	
12	Hull F.C.	27	10	0	17	502	623	−121	20	
13	Salford City Reds	27	7	0	20	456	754	−298	14	
14	Celtic Crusaders	27	3	0	24	357	874	−517	6	

Source: Rugby League Project
Rules for classification: 1) Points; 2) Points difference; 3) Number of points scored;
(C) Champions; (L) League Leaders' Shield Winners

== 2009 fixtures and results ==
LEGEND
Win
Draw
Loss

2009 Engage Super League

Date	Competition	Rnd	Vrs	H/A	Venue	Result	Score	Tries	Goals	Att
15 February 2009	Super League XIV	1	Hull Kingston Rovers	H	Odsal Stadium	D	13-13	Nero, Tadulala	Deacon 2/2, Deacon 1 DG	12,141
27 February 2009	Super League XIV	3	Huddersfield Giants	H	Odsal Stadium	L	12-16	Morrison	Deacon 4/4	10,186
7 March 2009	Super League XIV	4	Wigan Warriors	A	JJB Stadium	L	10-44	Menzies, Sheriffe	Deacon 1/2	12,588
15 March 2009	Super League XIV	5	Hull F.C.	H	Odsal Stadium	L	24-36	Jeffries, Menzies, Sheriffe, Tadulala	Deacon 4/4	11,327
21 March 2009	Super League XIV	6	Catalans Dragons	A	Stade Gilbert Brutus	W	30-24	Halley, Menzies, Newton, Sheriffe, Tadulala	Deacon 3/3, Sykes 2/2	7,620
29 March 2009	Super League XIV	7	Castleford Tigers	A	The Jungle	L	26-28	Deacon, Lynch, Morrison, Platt, Tadulala	Deacon 2/4, Sykes 1/2	9,185
10 April 2009	Super League XIV	8	Leeds Rhinos	H	Odsal Stadium	W	10-6	Sheriffe, Worrincy	Sykes 1/4	14,554
13 April 2009	Super League XIV	9	Wakefield Trinity Wildcats	A	Belle Vue	L	22-24	Menzies (2), Platt, Worrincy	Sykes 3/4	6,516
17 April 2009	Super League XIV	10	Warrington Wolves	H	Odsal Stadium	L	22-58	Solomona (2), Jeffries, Platt	Sykes 3/4	8,643
24 April 2009	Super League XIV	11	St. Helens	A	Knowsley Road	W	34-30	Tadulala (2), Worrincy (2), Burgess, Kopczak	Sykes 5/6	14,000
2 May 2009	Super League XIV	12	Wakefield Trinity Wildcats	N	Murrayfield Stadium	W	32-16	Sykes (3), Menzies, Newton, Worrincy	Deacon 4/6	29,627
17 May 2009	Super League XIV	13	Celtic Crusaders	H	Odsal Stadium	L	24-30	Lynch, Menzies, Sykes, Worrincy	Deacon 4/4	7,602
22 May 2009	Super League XIV	14	Salford City Reds	A	The Willows	L	10-18	Sykes (2)	Deacon 1/2	4,383
7 June 2009	Super League XIV	15	Wakefield Trinity Wildcats	H	Odsal Stadium	W	36-22	Menzies (2), Nero (2), Rinaldi	Deacon 8/8	8,387
14 June 2009	Super League XIV	16	Warrington Wolves	A	Halliwell Jones Stadium	W	21-10	Morrison, Nero, Newton	Deacon 4/4, Deacon 1 DG	9,606
21 June 2009	Super League XIV	17	St. Helens	H	Odsal Stadium	L	18-44	Morrison, Sheriffe, Tadulala	Deacon 3/4	10,599
26 June 2009	Super League XIV	18	Leeds Rhinos	A	Headingley Stadium	L	20-33	Deacon, Menzies, Tadulala	Deacon 4/5	17,824
5 July 2009	Super League XIV	19	Castleford Tigers	H	Odsal Stadium	L	38-40	Jeffries (2), Burgess, Halley, Scruton, Tadulala, Worrincy	Deacon 4/6, Sykes 1/1	8,971
12 July 2009	Super League XIV	20	Hull Kingston Rovers	A	Craven Park	L	12-32	Halley, Worrincy	Deacon 1/1, Sykes 1/1	8,206
19 July 2009	Super League XIV	21	Wigan Warriors	H	Odsal Stadium	L	14-20	Donaldson, Nero	Deacon 3/3	9,487
25 July 2009	Super League XIV	22	Celtic Crusaders	A	Brewery Field	W	34-12	Lynch (2), Halley, Morrison, Tadulala, Whitehead	Deacon 5/6	3,089
2 August 2009	Super League XIV	23	Harlequins RL	H	Odsal Stadium	L	14-22	Nero, Sykes, Tadulala	Deacon 1/3	7,813
8 August 2009	Super League XIV	2	Harlequins RL	A	Twickenham Stoop	W	42-18	Halley (3), Burgess, Godwin, Menzies, Worrincy	Deacon 7/7	3,112
16 August 2009	Super League XIV	24	Huddersfield Giants	A	Galpharm Stadium	W	28-18	Nero (2), Platt, Sykes	Deacon 6/6	7,982
23 August 2009	Super League XIV	25	Catalans Dragons	H	Odsal Stadium	W	42-18	Burgess, Deacon, Godwin, Menzies, Morrison, Nero, Sheriffe, Sykes	Deacon 5/8	7,919
6 September 2009	Super League XIV	26	Salford City Reds	H	Odsal Stadium	W	44-18	Nero (3), Langley (2), Tadulala (2), Lynch	Deacon 6/8	8,167
11 September 2009	Super League XIV	27	Hull F.C.	A	KC Stadium	W	21-18	Deacon, Donaldson, Worrincy	Deacon 4/4, Deacon 1 DG	10,412

== Challenge Cup ==
LEGEND
Win
Draw
Loss

Date	Competition	Rnd	Vrs	H/A	Venue	Result	Score	Tries	Goals	Att
5 April 2009	Cup	4th	Catalans Dragons	A	Stade Gilbert Brutus	L	38-40	Cook, Halley, Menzies, Nero, Sheriffe, Sykes, Tadulala	Deacon 5/7	6,450

== 2009 squad statistics ==
- Appearances and Points include (Super League, Challenge Cup and Play-offs).

No	Player	Position	Tries	Goals	DG	Points
1	Michael Platt	Fullback	4	0	0	16
2	Rikki Sheriffe	Wing	7	0	0	28
3	Paul Sykes	Centre	10	17	0	74
4	Chris Nero	Centre	13	0	0	52
5	Semi Tadulala	Wing	14	0	0	56
6	Ben Jeffries	Stand off	4	0	0	16
7	Paul Deacon	Scrum-half	3	91	3	297
8	Sam Burgess	Prop	4	0	0	16
9	Terry Newton	Hooker	3	0	0	12
10	Andy Lynch	Prop	5	0	0	20
11	Steve Menzies	Second row	13	0	0	52
12	Glenn Morrison	Second row	6	0	0	24
13	Jamie Langley	Loose forward	2	0	0	8
14	Wayne Godwin	Hooker	2	0	0	8
15	Matt Cook	Second row	1	0	0	4
16	Michael Worrincy	Second row	10	0	0	40
17	Nick Scruton	Prop	1	0	0	4
19	Craig Kopczak	Prop	1	0	0	4
20	Dave Halley	Wing	9	0	0	36
22	Matt James	Loose forward	0	0	0	0
23	Jason Crookes	Centre	0	0	0	0
24	Julien Rinaldi	Hooker	1	0	0	4
26	David Solomona	Second row	2	0	0	8
28	Elliott Whitehead	Second row	1	0	0	4
29	Tom Olbison	Second row	0	0	0	0
30	James Donaldson	Loose forward	2	0	0	8
