= 2008 Bradford Bulls season =

- Super League XIII Rank: 5th
- Play-off result: Elimination Play-Off
- Challenge Cup: Quarter-final
- 2008 record: Wins: 16; draws: 0; losses: 14
- Points scored: For: 879; against: 699

Team information
- Chairman: Peter Hood
- Head Coach: Steve McNamara
- Captain: Paul Deacon
- Stadium: Odsal Stadium
- Avg. attendance: 9,247
- High attendance: 14,013 vs. Leeds Rhinos

Top scorers
- Tries: Semi Tadulala (23)
- Goals: Paul Deacon (89)
- Points: Paul Deacon (190)
← 2007	List of seasons	2009 →

The 2008 Bradford Bulls season saw the Bradford Bulls compete in the 2008 Super League season and 2008 Challenge Cup. Coached by Steve McNamara and captained by Paul Deacon, they finished the regular season 5th (out of 12), reaching the Elimination semi-finals but being knocked out by Wigan.

== Milestones ==
- Round 2: Simon Finnigan scored his 1st try for the Bulls.
- Round 4: Chris Feather and Wayne Godwin scored their 1st tries for the Bulls.
- Round 6: Ben Jeffries scored his 1st try for the Bulls.
- Round 9: Semi Tadulala and Chris Nero scored their 1st tries for the Bulls.
- Round 9: Semi Tadulala scored his 1st hat-trick for the Bulls.
- Round 10: Paul Deacon reached 2,300 points for the Bulls.
- CCR4: Dave Halley scored his 1st four-try haul and 1st hat-trick for the Bulls.
- CCR4: Glenn Morrison scored his 1st hat-trick for the Bulls.
- CCR4: Semi Tadulala scored his 2nd hat-trick for the Bulls.
- CCR4: Iestyn Harris reached 300 points for the Bulls.
- Round 12: Paul Deacon kicked his 1,000th goal for the Bulls.
- CCR5: Semi Tadulala scored his 3rd hat-trick for the Bulls.
- Round 20: Iestyn Harris kicked his 100th goal for the Bulls.
- Round 23: Andy Lynch scored his 25th try and reached 100 points for the Bulls.
- Round 26: Paul Deacon reached 2,400 points for the Bulls.
- Round 27: Semi Tadulala scored his 4th hat-trick for the Bulls.

== Table ==
Super League XIII
Pos	Team	Pld	W	D	L	PF	PA	PD	Pts	Qualification
1	St. Helens (L)	27	21	1	5	940	457	+483	43	Semi-final
2	Leeds Rhinos (C)	27	21	0	6	863	413	+450	42	Semi-final
3	Catalans Dragons	27	16	2	9	694	625	+69	34	Elimination semi-finals
4	Wigan Warriors	27	13	3	11	648	698	−50	29	Elimination semi-finals
5	Bradford Bulls	27	14	0	13	705	625	+80	28	Elimination semi-finals
6	Warrington Wolves	27	14	0	13	690	713	−23	28	Elimination semi-finals
7	Hull Kingston Rovers	27	11	1	15	564	713	−149	23	
8	Wakefield Trinity Wildcats	27	11	0	16	574	760	−186	22	
9	Harlequins	27	11	0	16	569	763	−194	22	
10	Huddersfield Giants	27	10	1	16	638	681	−43	21	
11	Hull F.C.	27	8	1	18	538	699	−161	17	
12	Castleford Tigers	27	7	1	19	593	869	−276	15	

Source: superleague.co.uk
Rules for classification: 1st on competition points; 2nd on match points difference.
Competition points: for win = 2; for draw = 1; for loss = 0.
(C) Champions; (L) League Leaders' Shield Winners

== Fixtures and results ==
LEGEND
Win
Draw
Loss

2008 Engage Super League

Date	Competition	Rnd	Vrs	H/A	Venue	Result	Score	Tries	Goals	Att
10 February 2008	Super League XIII	1	Wakefield Trinity Wildcats	A	Belle Vue	L	24-26	Newton (2), Platt, Sykes	Deacon 4/5	9,851
16 February 2008	Super League XIII	2	Huddersfield Giants	H	Odsal Stadium	W	38-12	Finnigan (2), Evans, Morrison, Newton, Sykes	Deacon 7/7	10,124
22 February 2008	Super League XIII	3	St. Helens	H	Odsal Stadium	L	16-22	Sykes (2), Evans	Deacon 2/3	10,756
1 March 2008	Super League XIII	4	Wigan Warriors	A	JJB Stadium	L	14-28	Feather, Godwin	Deacon 3/3	15,444
8 March 2008	Super League XIII	5	Catalans Dragons	A	Stade Gilbert Brutus	W	20-18	Finnigan, Hape, Morrison	Deacon 4/4	7,485
16 March 2008	Super League XIII	6	Warrington Wolves	H	Odsal Stadium	W	23-10	Burgess, Jeffries, Sykes	Deacon 5/6	11,838
20 March 2008	Super League XIII	7	Leeds Rhinos	A	Headingley Stadium	L	2-44	-	Deacon 1/1	19,296
24 March 2008	Super League XIII	8	Harlequins RL	H	Odsal Stadium	W	32-24	Burgess, Deacon, Evans, Halley, Solomona	Deacon 6/6	8,428
30 March 2008	Super League XIII	9	Castleford Tigers	H	Odsal Stadium	W	50-4	Tadulala (3), Evans, Godwin, Hape, Jeffries, Nero, Sykes	Deacon 6/8, Harris 1/1	10,119
4 April 2008	Super League XIII	10	Hull F.C.	A	KC Stadium	W	24-8	Burgess, Cook, Nero, Tadulala	Deacon 4/6	13,617
13 April 2008	Super League XIII	11	Hull Kingston Rovers	A	Craven Park	L	18-20	Solomona, Sykes, Tadulala	Harris 3/3	8,377
27 April 2008	Super League XIII	12	Wigan Warriors	H	Odsal Stadium	W	26-12	Evans, Hape, Jeffries, Tadulala	Deacon 5/7	11,894
3 May 2008	Magic Weekend	13	Leeds Rhinos	N	Millennium Stadium	L	26-40	Tadulala (2), Burgess, Hape	Deacon 5/7	30,628
18 May 2008	Super League XIII	14	Castleford Tigers	A	The Jungle	W	46-24	Burgess, Finnigan, Jeffries, Langley, Morrison, Newton, Platt, Sykes	Deacon 7/8	7,855
23 May 2008	Super League XIII	15	Leeds Rhinos	H	Odsal Stadium	L	14-30	Halley, Solomona, Tupou	Sykes 1/3	14,013
8 June 2008	Super League XIII	16	Catalans Dragons	H	Odsal Stadium	L	16-24	Burgess, Jeffries, Sykes	Harris 2/3	8,346
13 June 2008	Super League XIII	17	St. Helens	A	Knowsley Road	L	20-58	Halley, Harris, Sykes, Tadulala	Sykes 2/3, Harris 0/1	9,009
22 June 2008	Super League XIII	18	Hull F.C.	H	Odsal Stadium	W	36-22	Tadulala (2), Cook, Hape, Lynch, Newton, Sykes	Harris 4/7	9,511
29 June 2008	Super League XIII	19	Hull Kingston Rovers	H	Odsal Stadium	W	40-20	Sykes (2), Finnigan, Hape, Harris, Platt, Solomona	Harris 6/7	9,741
6 July 2008	Super League XIII	20	Huddersfield Giants	A	Galpharm Stadium	L	24-25	Finnigan, Lynch, Newton, Platt	Harris 4/5	10,786
11 July 2008	Super League XIII	21	Warrington Wolves	A	Halliwell Jones Stadium	L	28-32	Jeffries, Lynch, Nero, Platt, Tadulala	Deacon 4/5	8,158
20 July 2008	Super League XIII	22	Wakefield Trinity Wildcats	H	Odsal Stadium	W	24-10	Deacon, Harris, Jeffries, Newton	Deacon 4/4	9,429
3 August 2008	Super League XIII	23	Harlequins RL	A	Twickenham Stoop	L	24-36	Finnigan, Jeffries, Lynch, Tadulala	Harris 4/4	2,534
8 August 2008	Super League XIII	24	Leeds Rhinos	A	Headingley Stadium	L	18-28	Evans, Godwin, Sykes	Harris 3/3	17,508
17 August 2008	Super League XIII	25	Hull F.C.	H	Odsal Stadium	W	42-14	Cook, Deacon, Evans, Godwin, Jeffries, Newton, Vagana	Deacon 7/7	9,181
25 August 2008	Super League XIII	26	Hull Kingston Rovers	H	Odsal Stadium	W	42-18	Cook, Evans, Halley, Nero, Newton, Solomona, Sykes, Tadulala	Deacon 5/7, Vagana 0/1	10,353
6 September 2008	Super League XIII	27	Castleford Tigers	A	The Jungle	W	18-16	Tadulala (3)	Deacon 1/2, Harris 2/2	8,067

== Challenge Cup ==
LEGEND
Win
Draw
Loss

Date	Competition	Rnd	Vrs	H/A	Venue	Result	Score	Tries	Goals	Att
19 April 2008	Cup	4th	Toulouse Olympique	H	Odsal Stadium	W	98-6	Halley (4), Morrison (3), Tadulala (3), Finnigan (2), Jeffries (2), Burgess, Evans, Tupou	Harris 15/17	3,569
11 May 2008	Cup	5th	Catalans Dragons	H	Odsal Stadium	W	46-16	Tadulala (3), Burgess, Halley, Hape, Langley, Nero	Deacon 7/7, Harris 0/1	5,057
1 June 2008	Cup	QF	Hull F.C.	H	Odsal Stadium	L	16-22	Sykes, Tupou	Harris 4/5	5,597

== Playoffs ==
LEGEND
Win
Draw
Loss

Date	Competition	Rnd	Vrs	H/A	Venue	Result	Score	Tries	Goals	Att
21 September 2007	Play-offs	EPO	Wigan Warriors	N	Halton Stadium	L	14-30	Finnigan, Lynch	Deacon 2/2, Harris 1/1	6,806

== Squad statistics ==
- Appearances and Points include (Super League, Challenge Cup and Play-offs) as of 2014.

No	Player	Position	Tries	Goals	DG	Points
1	Michael Platt	Fullback	5	0	0	20
2	Dave Halley	Wing	9	0	0	36
3	James Evans	Centre	9	0	0	36
4	Shontayne Hape	Centre	7	0	0	28
5	Tame Tupou	Wing	3	0	0	12
6	Iestyn Harris	Stand-off	3	49	0	110
7	Paul Deacon	Scrum-half	3	89	0	190
8	Joe Vagana	Prop	1	0	0	4
9	Terry Newton	Hooker	9	0	0	36
10	Andy Lynch	Prop	5	0	0	20
11	David Solomona	Second-row	5	0	0	20
12	Glenn Morrison	Second-row	6	0	0	24
13	Jamie Langley	Loose forward	2	0	0	8
14	Chris Feather	Prop	1	0	0	4
15	Matt Cook	Second-row	4	0	0	16
16	Sam Burgess	Prop	8	0	0	32
17	Matt James	Prop	0	0	0	0
18	Craig Kopczak	Prop	0	0	0	0
19	Simon Finnigan	Second-row	10	0	0	40
20	Wayne Godwin	Hooker	4	0	0	16
22	Ben Jeffries	Stand-off	11	0	0	44
23	Chris Nero	Centre	5	0	0	20
24	Paul Sykes	Centre	16	3	0	70
25	Semi Tadulala	Wing	23	0	0	92
26	Jason Crookes	Centre	0	0	0	0
27	Richard Johnson	Loose forward	0	0	0	0
30	Keale Carlile	Hooker	0	0	0	0
