= 2006 Bradford Bulls season =

- Super League XI Rank: 4th
- Play-off result: Semi-final
- Challenge Cup: 5th round
- 2006 record: Wins: 19; draws: 2; losses: 12
- Points scored: For: 947; against: 671

Team information
- Chairman: Chris Caisley
- Head coach: Brian Noble & Steve McNamara
- Captain: Jamie Peacock
- Stadium: Odsal Stadium
- Avg. attendance: 10,783
- High attendance: 16,603 vs. Leeds Rhinos

Top scorers
- Tries: Shontayne Hape (22)
- Goals: Paul Deacon (124)
- Points: Paul Deacon (277)
← 2005	List of seasons	2007 →

This article details the Bradford Bulls rugby league football club's 2006 season, the 11th season of the Super League era.

== 2006 milestones ==
- WCC: Marcus Bai and Stanley Gene scored their 1st tries for the Bulls.
- Round 1: Paul Deacon reached 1,700 points for the Bulls.
- Round 5: Marcus St Hilaire scored his 1st try for the Bulls.
- Round 7: Chris McKenna scored his 1st try for the Bulls.
- Round 10: Terry Newton scored his 1st try for the Bulls.
- Round 12: Stanley Gene scored his 1st hat-trick for the Bulls.
- Round 12: Brett Ferres kicked his 1st goal for the Bulls.
- Round 16: Paul Deacon reached 1,800 points for the Bulls.
- Round 19: Karl Pryce scored his 25th try and reached 100 points for the Bulls.
- Round 20: Karl Pryce scored his 2nd hat-trick for the Bulls.
- Round 23: Lesley Vainikolo scored his 125th try and reached 500 points for the Bulls.
- Round 23: Paul Deacon kicked his 800th goal for the Bulls.
- Round 25: Jamie Langley scored his 25th try and reached 100 points for the Bulls.
- Round 25: Paul Deacon reached 1,900 points for the Bulls.
- Round 28: Sam Burgess scored his 1st try for the Bulls.
- EPO: Shontayne Hape scored his 1st four-try haul and 4th hat-trick for the Bulls.
- ESF: Michael Withers scored his 8th hat-trick for the Bulls.
- ESF: Michael Withers reached 500 points for the Bulls.

== Table ==
Pos	Team	Pld	W	D	L	PF	PA	PD	Pts	Qualification
1	St Helens (L, C)	28	24	0	4	939	430	+509	48	Semi-final
2	Hull F.C.	28	20	0	8	720	578	+142	40	Semi-final
3	Leeds Rhinos	28	19	0	9	869	543	+326	38	Elimination play-offs
4	Bradford Bulls	28	16	2	10	802	568	+234	32 (Note: Bradford deducted 2 points for salary cap breaches in 2005.)	Elimination play-offs
5	Salford City Reds	28	13	0	15	600	539	+61	26	Elimination play-offs
6	Warrington Wolves	28	13	0	15	743	721	+22	26	Elimination play-offs
7	Harlequins	28	11	1	16	556	823	−267	23	
8	Wigan Warriors	28	12	0	16	644	715	−71	22 (Note: Wigan deducted 2 points for salary cap breaches in 2005.)	
9	Huddersfield Giants	28	11	0	17	609	753	−144	22	
10	Wakefield Trinity Wildcats	28	10	0	18	591	717	−126	20	
11	Castleford Tigers (R)	28	9	1	18	575	968	−393	19	Relegation to National League One
12	Catalans Dragons (X)	28	8	0	20	601	894	−293	16	

Source: Rugby League Project
Rules for classification: 1) Points; 2) Points difference; 3) Number of points scored;
(C) Champions; (L) League Leaders' Shield Winners; (R) Relegated; (X) Exempt from relegation

== World Club Challenge ==
LEGEND
Win
Draw
Loss

Date	Competition	Vrs	H/A	Venue	Result	Score	Tries	Goals	Att
3 February 2006	WCC	Wests Tigers	N	McAlpine Stadium	W	30–10	Bai (2), Fielden (2), Gene	I.Harris 5/6	19,207

2006 World Club Challenge Teams
Bradford Bulls	positions	Wests Tigers
1. Michael Withers	Fullback	1. Brett Hodgson
2. Marcus Bai	Winger	2. Shannon McDonnell
3. Ben Harris	Centre	3. Dean Collis
4. Shontayne Hape	Centre	4. Paul Whatuira
5. Lesley Vainikolo	Winger	5. Jamahl Lolesi
17. Karl Pryce	Stand off	6. Daniel Fitzhenry
6. Iestyn Harris	Scrum half	7. Scott Prince
29. Stuart Fielden	Prop	17. Ryan O'Hara
9. Ian Henderson	Hooker	9. Robbie Farah
14. Andy Lynch	Prop	10. John Skandalis
10. Brad Meyers	2nd Row	11. Anthony Laffranchi
12. Paul Johnson	2nd Row	12. Chris Heighington
16. Jamie Langley	Loose forward	13. Ben Galea
8. Joe Vagana	Interchange	8. Bryce Gibbs
15. Stanley Gene	Interchange	14. Liam Fulton
19. Brett Ferres	Interchange	15. Bronson Harrison
20. Matt Cook	Interchange	16. Sam Harris
Brian Noble	Coach	Tim Sheens

== 2006 fixtures and results ==
Legend
Win
Draw
Loss

2006 Engage Super League

Date	Competition	Rnd	Vrs	H/A	Venue	Result	Score	Tries	Goals	Att
12 February 2006	Super League XI	1	Wakefield Trinity Wildcats	A	Belle Vue	W	20–14	Gene, Hape, I.Harris	Deacon 4/4	9,157
18 February 2006	Super League XI	2	Harlequins RL	H	Odsal Stadium	D	18–18	Hape, B.Harris, Henderson	Deacon 3/5	11,097
24 February 2006	Super League XI	3	Salford City Reds	H	Odsal Stadium	W	34–4	I.Harris (2), Fielden, Gene, Hape, Meyers	Deacon 4/5, I.Harris 1/1	10,062
4 March 2006	Super League XI	4	Catalans Dragons	A	Stade Aime Giral	W	50–18	Hape (2), Lynch (2), Bai, Fielden, B.Harris, Langley, Smith	Deacon 7/9	9,373
10 March 2006	Super League XI	5	Hull F.C.	H	Odsal Stadium	W	18–12	Vainikolo (2), Pryce, St Hilaire	Deacon 1/4	10,700
17 March 2006	Super League XI	6	St. Helens	A	Knowsley Road	L	16–38	Hape (2), B.Harris	Deacon 2/3	12,352
24 March 2006	Super League XI	7	Wigan Warriors	H	Odsal Stadium	W	34–12	Bai, Hape, B.Harris, Lynch, McKenna, Pryce, Vainikolo	I.Harris 3/7	11,644
8 April 2006	Super League XI	8	Warrington Wolves	H	Odsal Stadium	L	18–22	Pryce (2), B.Harris, Vagana	Deacon 1/4	11,136
13 April 2006	Super League XI	9	Leeds Rhinos	A	Headingley Stadium	W	20–18	Bai, Ferres, Gene, I.Harris	Deacon 2/4	17,700
18 April 2006	Super League XI	10	Huddersfield Giants	H	Odsal Stadium	W	52–18	Vainikolo (2), Bai, Deacon, Fielden, Hape, Johnson, Newton, Pryce	Deacon 8/9	10,932
23 April 2006	Super League XI	11	Warrington Wolves	A	Halliwell Jones Stadium	L	4–27	Bai	Deacon 0/1	10,822
28 April 2006	Super League XI	12	Catalans Dragons	H	Odsal Stadium	W	54–6	Gene (3), B.Harris (2), Bai, Ferres, Hape, Lynch, Vainikolo	I.Harris 5/7, Ferres 2/2, Vainikolo 0/1	10,522
5 May 2006	Super League XI	13	Hull F.C.	A	KC Stadium	L	12–28	Pryce, Withers	I.Harris 2/2	12,180
13 May 2006	Super League XI	14	Harlequins RL	A	Twickenham Stoop	W	58–16	Hape (2), Lynch (2), Vainikolo (2), Bai, Fielden, Pryce, St Hilaire	Deacon 9/10	4,491
26 May 2006	Super League XI	15	Leeds Rhinos	H	Odsal Stadium	L	0–30	–	–	16,603
11 June 2006	Super League XI	16	Castleford Tigers	A	The Jungle	D	26–26	Newton (2), Deacon, Hape, Withers	Deacon 3/5	7,600
16 June 2006	Super League XI	17	St. Helens	H	Odsal Stadium	W	20–18	Deacon (2), Vainikolo	Deacon 4/6	12,450
23 June 2006	Super League XI	18	Huddersfield Giants	H	Odsal Stadium	W	42–16	Ferres (2), B.Harris (2), Vainikolo (2), Meyers	Deacon 7/7	10,655
30 June 2006	Super League XI	19	Salford City Reds	A	The Willows	L	16–17	Ferres, I.Harris, Pryce	Deacon 2/3	4,203
7 July 2006	Super League XI	20	Leeds Rhinos	A	Headingley Stadium	L	24–26	Pryce (3), St Hilaire	Deacon 4/5	17,700
14 July 2006	Super League XI	21	Catalans Dragons	H	Odsal Stadium	W	30–16	St Hilaire (2), Vainikolo (2), Ferres	Deacon 5/6	10,388
21 July 2006	Super League XI	22	Wakefield Trinity Wildcats	A	Belle Vue	W	42–20	Langley (2), Pryce (2), Hape, Henderson, Vainikolo	Deacon 7/8	4,003
4 August 2006	Super League XI	23	Warrington Wolves	H	Odsal Stadium	W	50–22	Newton (2), Gene, Hape, Lynch, Meyers, Pryce, Vagana, Vainikolo	Deacon 7/9	11,469
12 August 2006	Super League XI	24	Harlequins RL	A	Twickenham Stoop	L	26–28	Bai, Deacon, Ferres, Hape, Vainikolo	Deacon 3/5	3,793
18 August 2006	Super League XI	25	Castleford Tigers	H	Odsal Stadium	W	48–10	B.Harris (2), Pryce (2), Ferres, Langely, Meyers, McKenna, Vainikolo	Deacon 6/9	10,576
1 September 2006	Super League XI	26	Wigan Warriors	A	JJB Stadium	L	16–38	Lynch, Pryce, Withers	Deacon 2/3	15,830
8 September 2006	Super League XI	27	Wakefield Trinity Wildcats	H	Odsal Stadium	L	12–20	Withers (2)	Deacon 2/2	9,451
17 September 2006	Super League XI	28	Huddersfield Giants	A	Galpharm Stadium	W	42–30	St Hilaire (2), Withers (2), Bai, Burgess, Hape	Deacon 7/7	7,002

== Challenge Cup ==
Legend
Win
Draw
Loss

Date	Competition	Rnd	Vrs	H/A	Venue	Result	Score	Tries	Goals	Att
1 April 2006	Cup	4th	Hull F.C.	H	Odsal Stadium	W	23–12	Bai, Gene, Hape, Langley	Deacon 3/6, Deacon 1 DG	7,705
20 May 2006	Cup	5th	St. Helens	A	Knowsley Road	L	18–42	Withers (2), Vagana	Deacon 3/3	10,374

== Playoffs ==
Legend
Win
Draw
Loss

Date	Competition	Rnd	Vrs	H/A	Venue	Result	Score	Tries	Goals	Att
23 September 2006	Play-offs	EPO	Salford City Reds	H	Odsal Stadium	W	52–6	Hape (4), Burgess, Ferres, Lynch, McKenna, Withers	Deacon 8/9	8,611
30 September 2006	Play-offs	ESF	Warrington Wolves	H	Odsal Stadium	W	40–24	Withers (3), Deacon (2), Vainikolo	Deacon 8/8	12,302
6 October 2006	Play-offs	SF	Hull F.C.	A	KC Stadium	L	12–19	Ferres, Langley	Deacon 2/2	16,087

== 2006 squad statistics ==
- Appearances and points include (Super League, Challenge Cup and playoffs) as of 2012.

No	Player	Position	Tries	Goals	DG	Points
1	Michael Withers	Fullback	13	0	0	52
2	Marcus Bai	Wing	12	0	0	48
3	Ben Harris	Centre	11	0	0	44
4	Shontayne Hape	Centre	22	0	0	88
5	Lesley Vainikolo	Wing	18	0	0	72
6	Iestyn Harris	Stand off	5	16	0	52
7	Paul Deacon	Scrum-half	7	124	1	277
8	Joe Vagana	Prop	3	0	0	12
9	Ian Henderson	Hooker	2	0	0	8
10	Brad Meyers	Prop	4	0	0	16
11	Chris McKenna	Second row	3	0	0	12
12	Paul Johnson	Second row	1	0	0	4
13	Terry Newton	Hooker	5	0	0	20
14	Andy Lynch	Prop	9	0	0	36
15	Stanley Gene	Loose forward	9	0	0	36
16	Jamie Langley	Loose forward	6	0	0	24
17	Karl Pryce	Wing	17	0	0	68
18	Adam Watene	Prop	0	0	0	0
19	Brett Ferres	Second row	10	2	0	44
20	Matt Cook	Second row	0	0	0	0
22	Nicky Saxton	Fullback	0	0	0	0
23	Ryan Atkins	Centre	0	0	0	0
24	Anthony Tonks	Prop	0	0	0	0
25	Matty Brooks	Wing	0	0	0	0
26	Matt James	Prop	0	0	0	0
27	Dave Halley	Wing	0	0	0	0
28	Craig Kopczak	Prop	0	0	0	0
29	Stuart Fielden	Prop	6	0	0	24
30	Sam Burgess	Loose forward	2	0	0	8
31	Marcus St Hilaire	Fullback	7	0	0	28
32	Andy Smith	Wing	1	0	0	4
