= Jamie Langley =

GB & England international rugby league footballer

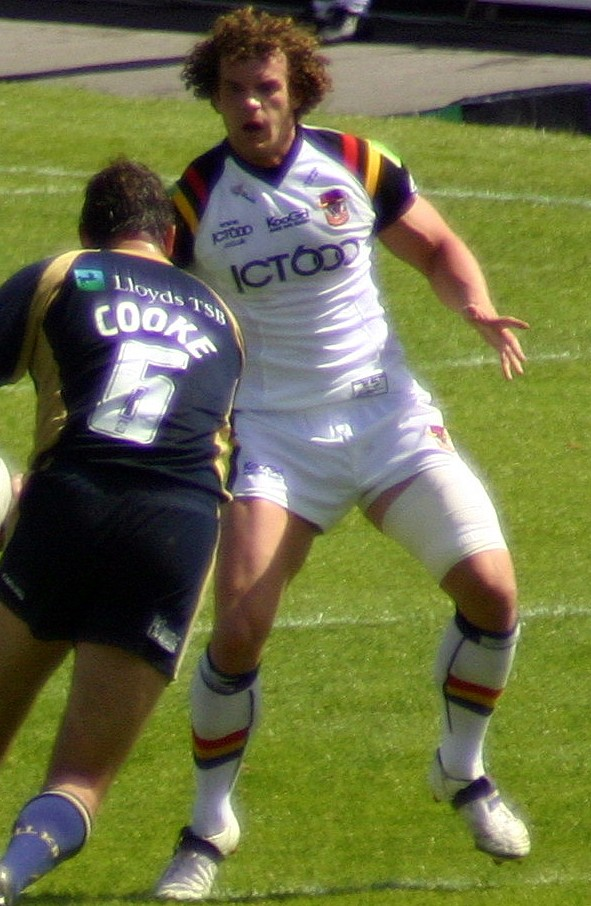

Personal information
- Full name: Jamie John Langley
- Born: 21 December 1983 (age 42) Normanton, West Yorkshire, England

Playing information
- Height: 6 ft 2 in (1.88 m)
- Weight: 15 st 10 lb (100 kg)
- Position: Loose forward, Second-row
Club
Years	Team	Pld	T	G	FG	P
2002–13	Bradford Bulls	258	39	0	0	156
2014	Hull Kingston Rovers	11	1	0	0	4
2015	Sheffield Eagles	12	1	0	0	4
	Total	281	41	0	0	164
Representative
Years	Team	Pld	T	G	FG	P
2004–08	England	5	0	0	0	0
2007	Great Britain	1	1	0	0	4

Coaching information
Club
Years	Team	Gms	W	D	L	W%
2016–21	London Broncos (Academy)

Jamie John Langley (born 21 December 1983) is an English professional rugby league coach who is an assistant coach at the Leeds Rhinos in the Super League and a former professional rugby league footballer.

A Great Britain international loose forward, he has also played for England and with Bradford Bulls won the Super League championship and Challenge Cup with them, and he has also played for Hull Kingston Rovers and the Sheffield Eagles. Jamie Langley is the son of the rugby league footballer who played in the 1960s and 1970s for Leeds; John Langley.

His position of choice was loose forward though he could also play in the second-row. He played for the Super League side the Bradford Bulls in England. He was named the vice-captain for the 2010 season, which was also his testimonial season.

== Background ==
Langley was born in Normanton, West Yorkshire.

== Bradford Bulls ==
Having won Super League VIII, Bradford played against 2003 NRL Premiers, the Penrith Panthers in the 2004 World Club Challenge. Langley played from the interchange bench in the Bulls' 22-4 victory. Langley played for the Bradford Bulls from the interchange bench in their 2004 Super League Grand Final loss against the Leeds Rhinos. In 2005 he made 28 appearances and played for the Bradford Bulls from the interchange bench in their 2005 Super League Grand Final victory against the Leeds Rhinos. As Super League champions Bradford faced National Rugby League premiers Wests Tigers in the 2006 World Club Challenge. Langley played at loose forward in the Bulls' 30-10 victory.

=== Awards ===
In 2006 Jamie was awarded 3 club awards for his performances throughout the season, these included; The Peter Lovett Trophy for Top Tackler and the Telegraph and Argus Best Average Award, with 7.39. He also got Head Coach Steve McNamara’s vote as Prized Bull.

Langley signed a new 3-year contract on 3 April 2007 to keep at the Bulls until 2010. Langley missed the later part of 2007 through injury.

== Representative ==
=== England ===
Langley captained the England Academy team that famously defeated the Australian schoolboys side.

Langley won caps for England while at Bradford Bulls in 2004 against Russia, France, and Ireland.

In September 2008 he was named in the England training squad for the 2008 Rugby League World Cup, and in October 2008 he was named in the final 24-man England squad.

He was named in the England team to face Wales at the Keepmoat Stadium prior to England's departure for the 2008 Rugby League World Cup.

=== Great Britain ===
In June 2007, Langley was called up to the Great Britain squad for the Test match against France He was also called up for the Great Britain Train on Squad for the test series with New Zealand.

== Coaching career ==
=== London Broncos ===
On 13 October 2015, Langley announced he had retired from playing rugby league and was appointed head coach of the academy at the London Broncos (who compete in the u19s and u16s Super League Academy leagues) on a 2-year contract.

=== Sale Sharks ===
Langley joined Sale Sharks as Peak Performance Coach in May 2021, joining former team mates Paul Deacon and Mike Forshaw at the club.

== Statistics ==
=== Club career ===
Season	Appearance	Tries	Goals	F/G	Points
2002 Bradford Bulls	2	0	0	0	0
2003 Bradford Bulls	16	2	0	0	8
2004 Bradford Bulls	30	8	0	0	32
2005 Bradford Bulls	26	10	0	0	40
2006 Bradford Bulls	30	6	0	0	24
2007 Bradford Bulls	18	4	0	0	16
2008 Bradford Bulls	28	2	0	0	8
2009 Bradford Bulls	26	2	0	0	8
2010 Bradford Bulls	20	0	0	0	0
2011 Bradford Bulls	15	0	0	0	0
2012 Bradford Bulls	25	4	0	0	16
2013 Bradford Bulls	20	2	0	0	8
2014 Hull KR	9	1	0	0	4
2015 Sheffield Eagles	5	1	0	0	4
Total	270	42	0	0	168

=== Representative career ===
Year	Team	Matches	Tries	Goals	Field Goals	Points
2004	England	3	0	0	0	
2007	Great Britain	1	0	0	0	
2008	England	1	0	0	0	

== Outside rugby league ==
In 2013, Langley launched a clothing brand with former team mates Wayne Godwin and Duane Straugheir named 'We Are Taurus'.
