= Craig Kopczak =

Wales international rugby league footballer

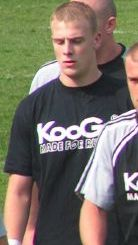

Personal information
- Full name: Craig Kopczak
- Born: 20 December 1986 (age 39) Bradford, West Yorkshire, England
- Height: 6 ft 4 in (1.93 m)
- Weight: 17 st 0 lb (108 kg)

Playing information
- Position: Prop, Second-row
Club
Years	Team	Pld	T	G	FG	P
2006–12	Bradford Bulls	123	11	0	0	44
2008(loan)	→ Halifax	5	0	0	0	0
2013–15	Huddersfield Giants	90	6	0	0	24
2016–18	Salford Red Devils	84	13	0	0	52
2019–20	Wakefield Trinity	43	3	0	0	12
2021–23	Featherstone Rovers	51	12	0	0	48
2024–25	Oldham	20	4	0	0	16
	Total	416	49	0	0	196
Representative
Years	Team	Pld	T	G	FG	P
2007–17	Wales	22	1	0	0	4
- Source: As of 28 January 2024

Craig Kopczak (born 20 December 1986) is a former Wales international rugby league footballer who most recently as a prop for Oldham RLFC in the RFL Championship.

He previously played for the Bradford Bulls in the Super League, and on loan from Bradford at Halifax in 2008's National League One. Kopczak has also played for the Huddersfield Giants, Wakefield Trinity and the Salford Red Devils in the Super League.

== Background ==
Craig Kopczak was born in Bradford, West Yorkshire, England.

Craig is married to Victoria and they have two children, Poppy and Harvey.

== Playing career ==
=== Bradford ===
Kopczak made his Bradford début in 2006. He spent at period in 2008 on loan at Halifax, and later established himself as an important first-team player for Bradford. He scored his first try for the club against St Helens in 2008, and scored his first career hat-trick against Wakefield Trinity.

=== Huddersfield ===
Kopczak signed a three-year deal with Huddersfield after he left the Bradford club. He played for the club for three years and was a member of the team that won the League Leaders' Shield in 2013.

=== Salford ===
Kopczak joined Salford ahead of the 2016 Super League season.

=== Wakefield Trinity ===
Kopczak joined Wakefield Trinity in October 2018 on a one-year deal for the 2019 Super League season, after Salford accepted a transfer fee from the West Yorkshire club. He signed a contract extension in March 2019, remaining at the club until the end of the 2020 Super League season.

=== Featherstone Rovers ===
On 5 December 2020, it was announced that he would join Featherstone Rovers in the RFL Championship for the 2021 season. On 28 May 2022, he played for Featherstone in their 2022 RFL 1895 Cup final loss against Leigh.

=== Oldham RLFC ===
On 23 October 2023, he joined Oldham RLFC for the 2024 season on a two-year deal. Oldham were crowned RFL League One champions in 2024 and automatically promoted to the RFL Championship.

On 31 March 2025, Kopczak announced that he was retiring from Rugby League with immediate effect.

== Statistics ==
Season	Team	Apps	Tries	Goals	D/G	Points
2006	Bradford Bulls	2	0	0	0	0
2007	Bradford Bulls	4	0	0	0	0
2008	Bradford Bulls	17	0	0	0	0
2009	Bradford Bulls	26	1	0	0	4
2010	Bradford Bulls	29	2	0	0	8
2011	Bradford Bulls	28	6	0	0	24
2012	Bradford Bulls	17	2	0	0	8
	Sub-total:	123	11	0	0	44
2008	Halifax R.L.F.C. (loan)	4	0	0	0	0
2013	Huddersfield Giants	30	4	0	0	16
2014	Huddersfield Giants	28	1	0	0	4
2015	Huddersfield Giants	32	1	0	0	4
	Sub-total:	89	6	0	0	24
2016	Salford Red Devils	30	5	0	0	20
2017	Salford Red Devils	32	7	0	0	28
2018	Salford Red Devils	22	1	0	0	4
	Sub-total:	84	13	0	0	52
2019	Wakefield Trinity	29	2	0	0	8
2020	Wakefield Trinity	14	1	0	0	4
	Sub-total:	43	3	0	0	12
2021	Featherstone Rovers	20	6	0	0	24
2022	Featherstone Rovers	14	2	0	0	8
2023	Featherstone Rovers	15	2	0	0	8
	Sub-total:	49	10	0	0	40
2024	Oldham RLFC	0	0	0	0	0
	Total	392	43	0	0	172

== Wales ==
Although born in England, Craig represents Wales at international level due to his heritage. He made his Wales début in 2007, and scored his first Wales try in a match against England in 2009.

He featured for Wales in the 2011 Four Nations. He was Wales player of the tournament during the Four Nations, whilst also winning Bradford's Player of the Year 2011.

He captained Wales in the 2013 Rugby League World Cup and 2015 European Cup. He captained the team again in the following year's 2017 World Cup qualifiers.

Craig retired from International Rugby League in 2018.
