= Graham Southernwood =

English professional rugby league footballer

Personal information
- Born: 5 November 1971 (age 54) Hemsworth, England

Playing information
- Position: Hooker
Club
Years	Team	Pld	T	G	FG	P
1988–93	Castleford	83	12	0	1	49
1994–95	Featherstone Rovers	44	9	0	0	36
1997	Hunslet	41	17	0	0	68
	Total	168	38	0	1	153
Representative
Years	Team	Pld	T	G	FG	P
1990–92	Great Britain U-21	6	3	0	0	12
- Relatives: Cain Southernwood (son); Roy Southernwood (brother)

Graham Paul Southernwood (born 5 November 1971) is an English former professional rugby league footballer who played in the 1980s and 1990s. He played at club level for Redhill ARLFC (in Airedale, Castleford), Castleford, Featherstone Rovers and Hunslet, as a hooker.

== Background ==
Southernwood was born in Hemsworth, West Riding of Yorkshire, England.

== Playing career ==
=== Castleford ===
Southernwood made his début for Castleford in the 28-2 victory over Workington Town on Sunday 30 October 1988.

In the 1991–92 season, Southernwood played in Castleford's 26-6 victory over Bradford Northern in the 1991 Yorkshire Cup Final at Elland Road, Leeds on Sunday 20 October 1991, and in Castleford's 12-28 defeat by Wigan in the 1992 Challenge Cup Final at Wembley Stadium, London on Saturday 2 May 1992, in front of a crowd of 77,386.

=== Featherstone Rovers ===
Southernwood made his début for Featherstone Rovers on Sunday 6 February 1994. In the 1994–95 season, he scored a try in Featherstone Rovers' 22-39 defeat by Leeds in the 1995 Challenge Cup semi-final at Elland Road, Leeds on Saturday 1 April 1995, and he played his last match for Featherstone Rovers during the 1995–96 season.

== Personal life ==
Southernwood is the father of the rugby league footballer, Cain Southernwood, and is the younger brother of the rugby league footballer; Roy Southernwood.
