= Michael Platt (rugby league) =

Ireland international rugby league footballer

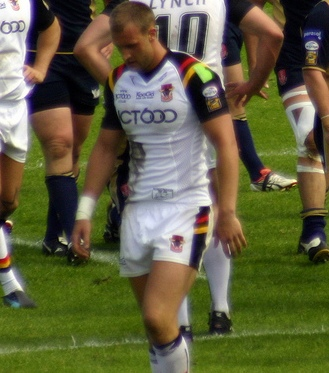

Personal information
- Full name: Michael Platt
- Born: 23 March 1984 (age 42) Manchester, Greater Manchester, England

Playing information
- Height: 6 ft 2 in (1.88 m)
- Weight: 15 st 8 lb (99 kg)
- Position: Fullback, Centre, Wing
Club
Years	Team	Pld	T	G	FG	P
2001–04	Salford City Reds	13	4	0	0	4
2004–05	Rochdale Hornets	22	10	0	0	40
2005–06	Castleford Tigers	55	23	0	0	92
2007–13	Bradford Bulls	143	46	0	0	184
2013	Dewsbury Rams	1	0	0	0	0
2014	North Wales Crusaders	3	0	0	0	0
2014	Salford Red Devils	2	1	0	0	4
2014	Barrow Raiders	2	0	0	0	0
2014–15	Leigh Centurions	15	7	0	0	28
	Total	256	91	0	0	352
Representative
Years	Team	Pld	T	G	FG	P
2003–14	Ireland	7	2	0	0	8

Michael Platt (born 23 March 1984) is a former Ireland international rugby league footballer who played for the Salford Red Devils; he joined the Salford Red Devils in April 2014 and is contacted until the end of the 2014 season following a successful trial with the Superleague club. Michael joined the Red Devils following 3 appearances with the North Wales Crusaders in 2014. Platt's 1st choice position is Full Back but he has been more effective at Centre for the Bradford Bulls winning the 'Rugby League World Centre of the Month' for August.

== Background ==
Platt was born in Manchester, England.

== Early career ==
Platt started his career at the Salford City Reds, making his début in the Super League against the Wakefield Trinity Wildcats in the final game of the 2001 season at just 17. However he never quite made the grade and was released by the club.

Michael then signed for the Rochdale Hornets. His impressive début season was somewhat blighted by a broken jaw, although he did go on to win the National League's Young Player of the Year award in 2004.

== Castleford Tigers ==
Michael then joined the Castleford Tigers, and helped the Tigers gain promotion in 2005. Despite the subsequent Super League season proving to be difficult in a squad which lacked quality, Platt still managed to score 7 tries. However, after a heart-breaking 29–17 defeat against Wakefield in the final game of the season, Castleford were relegated.

== Bradford Bulls ==
Platt joined the Bradford Bulls in 2007 after a dispute between Platt and Castleford over his availability. His first season started well and he topped the try-scorers league for a number of weeks at the start of the season. He extended his contract in 2011 for a further 2 years, meaning he will stay with the Bulls until at least 2013.

Season	Appearance	Tries	Goals	F/G	Points
2007 Bradford Bulls	28	14	0	0	56
2008 Bradford Bulls	20	5	0	0	20
2009 Bradford Bulls	20	4	0	0	16
2010 Bradford Bulls	21	5	0	0	20
2011 Bradford Bulls	21	2	0	0	8
2012 Bradford Bulls	18	11	0	0	44
2013 Bradford Bulls	13	5	0	0	20
2014 North Wales Crusaders	3	0	0	0	0
2014 Salford Red Devils	2	0	0	0	0
Total	148	46	0	0	184

== Return to hometown club ==
On 18 April 2014, Salford head coach, and former Bradford Bulls team-mate, Iestyn Harris signed up Michael to play for the Red Devils for the remainder of the 2014 season.

== International ==
Platt is an Irish international. He was overlooked by Tony Smith for Great Britain and this has been seen to be due to his allegiance to Ireland for the World Cup 2008 in Australia, and the continuing outstanding form of Paul Wellens. However he was called up for the Great Britain Squad for the 2007 test series with New Zealand, and played at full back for the prestigious Northern Union game against All Golds in a centenary match.

He was named in the Ireland training squad for the 2008 Rugby League World Cup, and the Ireland squad for the 2008 Rugby League World Cup.

In October 2014, Platt played in the European Cup competition.
