= Roy Southernwood =

English rugby league footballer

Personal information
- Full name: Roy Southernwood
- Born: 23 June 1968 (age 57)

Playing information
- Position: Scrum-half, Hooker
Club
Years	Team	Pld	T	G	FG	P
1985–90	Castleford	58	9	0	0	36
1990–96	Halifax	158	32
1996–01	Wakefield Trinity (Wildcats)	118	28
	Total	334	69	0	0	36
Representative
Years	Team	Pld	T	G	FG	P
1989	Great Britain U-21s	2
- Relatives: Cain Southernwood (nephew); Graham Southernwood (brother)

Roy Southernwood (born 23 June 1968) is a former professional rugby league footballer who played in the 1980s, 1990s and 2000s. He played at club level for Great Britain (Under-21s), and at club level for Castleford, Halifax and Wakefield Trinity (Wildcats) (captain), as a scrum-half, or hooker.

== Playing career ==
=== International honours ===
Roy Southernwood was the captain for the Great Britain Under-21s twice against France in 1989, winning the man of the match award on the return leg at Headingley, Leeds.

=== County Cup Final appearances ===
Roy Southernwood played scrum-half in Castleford's 12-12 draw with Bradford Northern in the 1987 Yorkshire Cup Final during the 1987–88 season at Headingley, Leeds on Saturday 17 October 1987, played stand-off in the 2-11 defeat by Bradford Northern in the 1987 Yorkshire Cup Final replay during the 1987–88 season at Elland Road, Leeds on Saturday 31 October 1987, and played hooker in the 11-8 victory over Wakefield Trinity in the 1990 Yorkshire Cup Final during the 1990–91 season at Elland Road, Leeds on Sunday 23 September 1990.

=== First Division Grand Final appearances ===
Roy Southernwood played hooker and scored a try in Wakefield Trinity's 24-22 victory over Featherstone Rovers in the 1998 First Division Grand Final at the McAlpine Stadium, Huddersfield on Saturday 26 September 1998.

== Contemporaneous article extract ==
"Roy Southernwood Scrum-half. Skilful Scrum half who graduated through the junior league ranks in Castleford, and seemed set for a long career at Wheldon Road. Played for Great Britain U-21s twice against France in 1989. His transfer to Halifax meant more first team opportunities and he starred in the 1990-91 promotion season."

== Personal life ==
Roy Southernwood is the older brother of the rugby league footballer, Graham Southernwood, and is the uncle of Graham Southernwood's son, the rugby league footballer, Cain Southernwood.
