= Kieran Hyde =

English rugby league footballer

Personal information
- Full name: Kieran Hyde
- Born: 10 October 1989 (age 36) England
- Height: 5 ft 10 in (178 cm)
- Weight: 46 st 6 lb (295 kg; 650 lb)

Playing information
- Position: Stand-off, Scrum-half, Fullback
Club
Years	Team	Pld	T	G	FG	P
2010–12	Wakefield Trinity Wildcats	13	4	4	0	24
2012(loan)	→ Doncaster	8	5	3	0	26
2013–15	Dewsbury Rams	60	11	41	5	131
2015–16	Swinton Lions
2017	Gloucestershire All Golds	2	0	5	0	10
	Total	83	20	53	5	191
- Source: As of 12 May 2021

Kieran Hyde (born 10 October 1989), also known by the nickname of "Kez", was an English professional rugby league footballer who last played for Oxford in Kingstone Press League 1.

He has played for the Bradford Bulls and the Wakefield Trinity Wildcats in the Super League, as a fullback, stand-off, or scrum-half. He is a fullback by choice, but can play anywhere in the three quarter line. Hyde signed for the Wakefield Trinity Wildcats from the Bradford Bulls, as a part of the deal which took Cain Southernwood to the Bradford Bulls. Hyde made his first team début whilst at Wakefield Trinity Wildcats in a round 21 2010's Super League XV game against St. Helens, where he scored a try from fullback. John Kear hinted that Hyde may move into the scrum-half position, instead of his usual fullback role. Hyde also played for Wakefield Trinity Wildcats in the annual Festive Challenge against Leeds Rhinos on New Year's Day 2011, coming from the bench to score a length of the field interception try.

After two seasons with the Dewsbury Rams, Hyde joined Swinton Lions in November 2015.

Hyde played for the England Schoolboys in 2008.
