= Wayne Godwin =

England international rugby league footballer

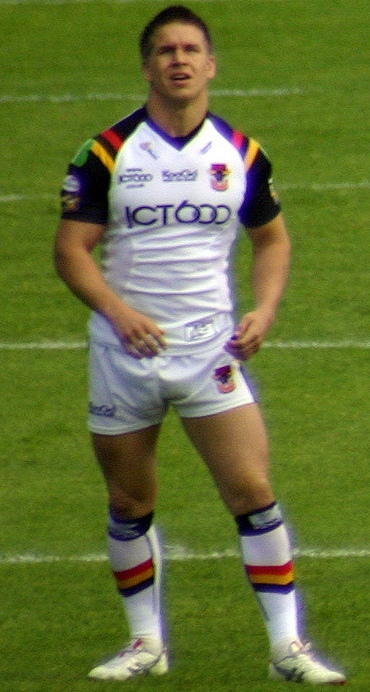

Personal information
- Full name: Wayne Robert Godwin
- Born: 13 March 1982 (age 43) Pontefract, West Yorkshire, England

Playing information
- Height: 5 ft 9 in (175 cm)
- Weight: 13 st 8 lb (86 kg)
- Position: Hooker
Club
Years	Team	Pld	T	G	FG	P
2001–04	Castleford Tigers	69	18	56	0	184
2005–06	Wigan Warriors	52	7	0	0	28
2007–08	Hull FC	19	4	0	0	16
2009–10	Bradford Bulls	43	7	0	0	28
2011–13	Salford Red Devils	52	6	0	0	24
2014–15	Dewsbury Rams	16	5	0	0	20
2015(loan)	→ Salford Red Devils	3	0	0	0	0
	Total	254	47	56	0	300
Representative
Years	Team	Pld	T	G	FG	P
2004	England	3	1	20	0	44

Wayne Robert Godwin (born 13 March 1982) is an English former professional rugby league footballer who played as a hooker in the 2000s and 2010s.

Godwin played for Castleford Tigers, Wigan Warriors, Hull FC, Bradford Bulls and Salford Red Devils in the Super League, and for Dewsbury Rams in the Championship.

== Background ==
Godwin was born in Pontefract, West Yorkshire, England. He supported the Castleford Tigers as a child.

== Early career ==
Godwin turned pro in 2002, being signed from his local club Knottingley Rockware to play for Castleford until the end of 2004, making over 60 appearances. Godwin signed a two-year deal with Wigan after Castleford's relegation at the end of 2004's Super League IX.

Goodwin was called into the England A squad for the 2004 European Challenge Cup.

Godwin signed for Hull F.C. in 2006.

=== Bradford ===
Godwin signed for Bradford in 2008 and was the understudy to Terry Newton, during his time at Bradford he always wore the number 14 shirt and established himself as a fans' favourite. During his time at Bradford he played many different positions including loose forward several times.

Mick Potter's arrival at Odsal and the arrival of the vastly experienced hooker Matt Diskin put Godwin in a position where he would be the 3rd choice hooker and would not feature in every game of the 2011 season.

=== Salford ===
It was announced that Godwin had joined Salford due to their intended hooker, Tevita Leo Latu being refused a visa. On Godwin's début, he scored a try but Salford still lost 13–12 to Leigh.

=== Dewsbury ===
Goodwin signed for Dewsbury for the 2014 season, playing in the Championship. On 15 March 2015, Godwin returned on a four-week loan to Salford.

== Statistics ==
=== Club career ===
Year	Club	Apps	Pts	T	G	DG
2001	Castleford	6	8	2	-	-
2002	Castleford	13	20	5	-	-
2003	Castleford	20	20	5	-	–
2004	Castleford	25	136	6	56	–
2005	Wigan	23	8	2	-	–
2006	Wigan	24	16	4	-	–
2007	Hull F.C.	16	4	1	-	–
2008	Bradford Bulls	12	8	2	-	–

=== International career ===
Year	Team	Matches	Tries	Goals	Drop Goals	Points
2004	England	3	1	20	0	44

== Outside rugby league ==
In 2013, Godwin launched a clothing brand with former team mates Jamie Langley and Duane Straugheir named 'We Are Taurus'.
