= Cain Southernwood =

English professional rugby league footballer

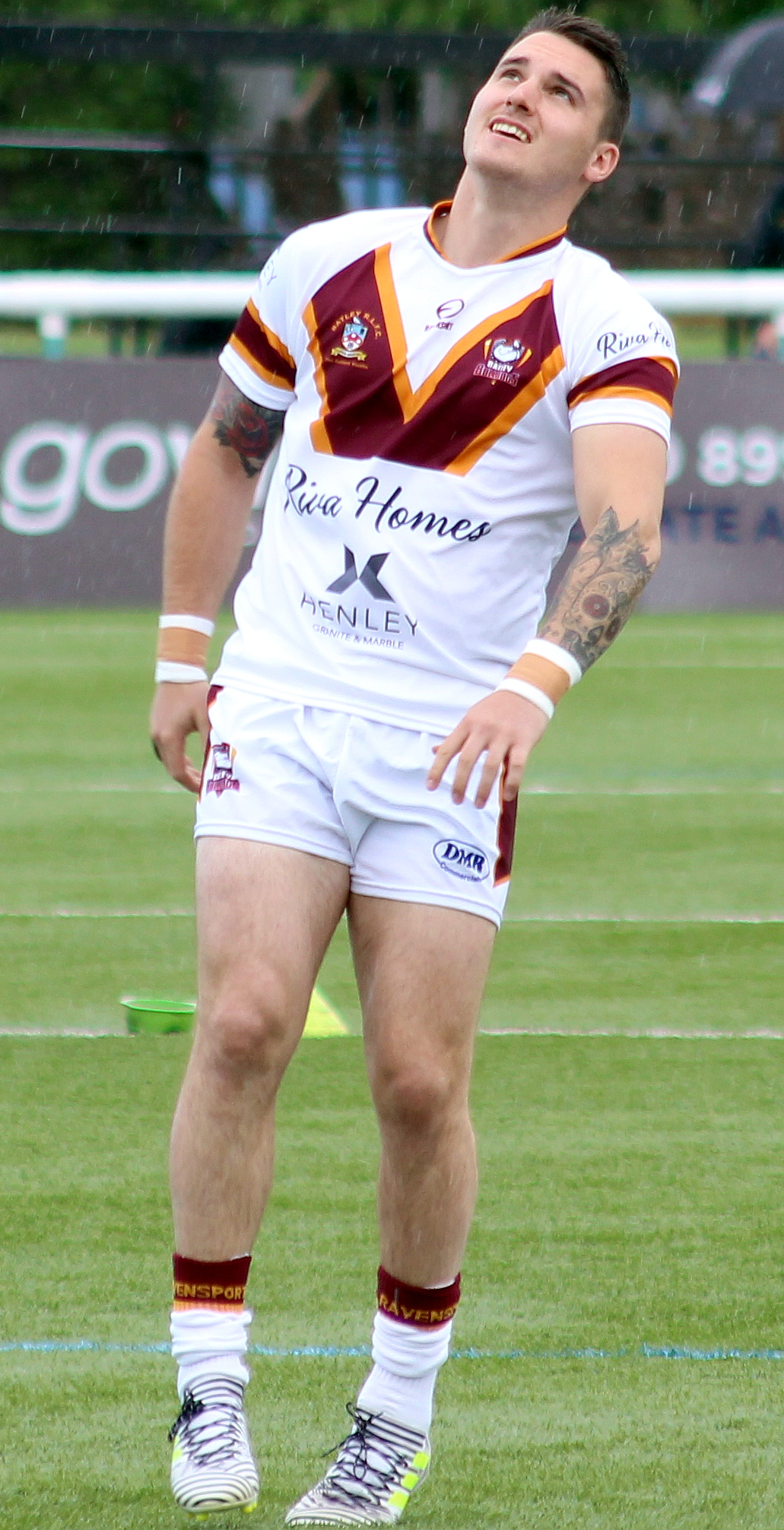

Personal information
- Full name: Cain Southernwood
- Born: 4 May 1992 (age 34)
- Height: 5 ft 7 in (1.70 m)
- Weight: 11 st 0 lb (70 kg)

Playing information
- Position: Stand-off, Scrum-half
Club
Years	Team	Pld	T	G	FG	P
2010–12	Bradford Bulls	2	0	0	0	0
2012(loan)	→ Dewsbury Rams	5	1	0	0	4
2013–14	Whitehaven	52	14	76	2	210
2015–17	Batley Bulldogs	63	11	49	1	143
2018–19	Hunslet	29	10	6	0	52
	Total	151	36	131	3	409
- Source: As of 18 October 2019
- Father: Graham Southernwood
- Relatives: Roy Southernwood (uncle)

Cain Southernwood (born 4 May 1992) is a professional rugby league footballer who has played in the 2010s. He has played at club level for Smawthorne A.R.L.F.C. (in Castleford), Wakefield Trinity Wildcats (Academy), in the Super League for Bradford Bulls, in the Championships for Dewsbury Rams (loan), Whitehaven, Batley Bulldogs and in Betfred League 1 for Hunlset, as a stand-off or scrum-half.

He was a member of the Wakefield Trinity Wildcats Academy grand final winning team in 2009, he was selected for the England Academy squad from which the side to face France and Australia was selected.

== Bradford Bulls ==
Southernwood signed for Bradford Bulls mid-2010 from Wakefield Trinity Wildcats on a three-year deal. Statistic do not include pre-season friendlies.

=== 2010 ===
Southerwood made his début against Warrington due to an injury to Matt Orford. He featured in the following game against Castleford, but then wasn't selected for the remainder of the season.

=== 2011 ===
Southernwood featured in three of the four pre-season games. He played against Halifax, Dewsbury and Keighley. Southernwood was not selected to play in any league or cup matches that season.

=== 2012 ===
Southernwood was sent on a season long loan to Championship side Dewsbury.

== Whitehaven ==
=== 2013 ===
Southernwood signed for Whitehaven for the 2013 Championship season. He scored a try against Keighley Cougars. He kicked three goals against Workington Town and kicked five against Sheffield Eagles. In the Challenge Cup he scored a try and kicked five goals against London Skolars. Southernwood also scored in the Northern Rail Cup against London Skolars. He kicked three goals against Hunslet. He scored two tries and kicked three goals against Sheffield Eagles and also kicked three goals against Leigh. He scored a try against Keighley, Leigh and Swinton Lions.

=== 2014 ===
Southernwood kicked three goals against Keighley Cougars. He then kicked three goals and a drop goal in the win against Dewsbury. In the Challenge Cup he scored a try and kicked four goals against York City. Southernwood kicked a goal in the loss to Halifax. He kicked four goals against Barrow. He scored a try and kicked two goals against Barrow Raiders. He kicked three goals against Workington Town. Southernwood kicked five goals against Batley. He kicked four goals and a drop goal against Doncaster and he scored a try and kicked three goals against Swinton Lions. Southernwood kicked a goal against Featherstone Rovers.

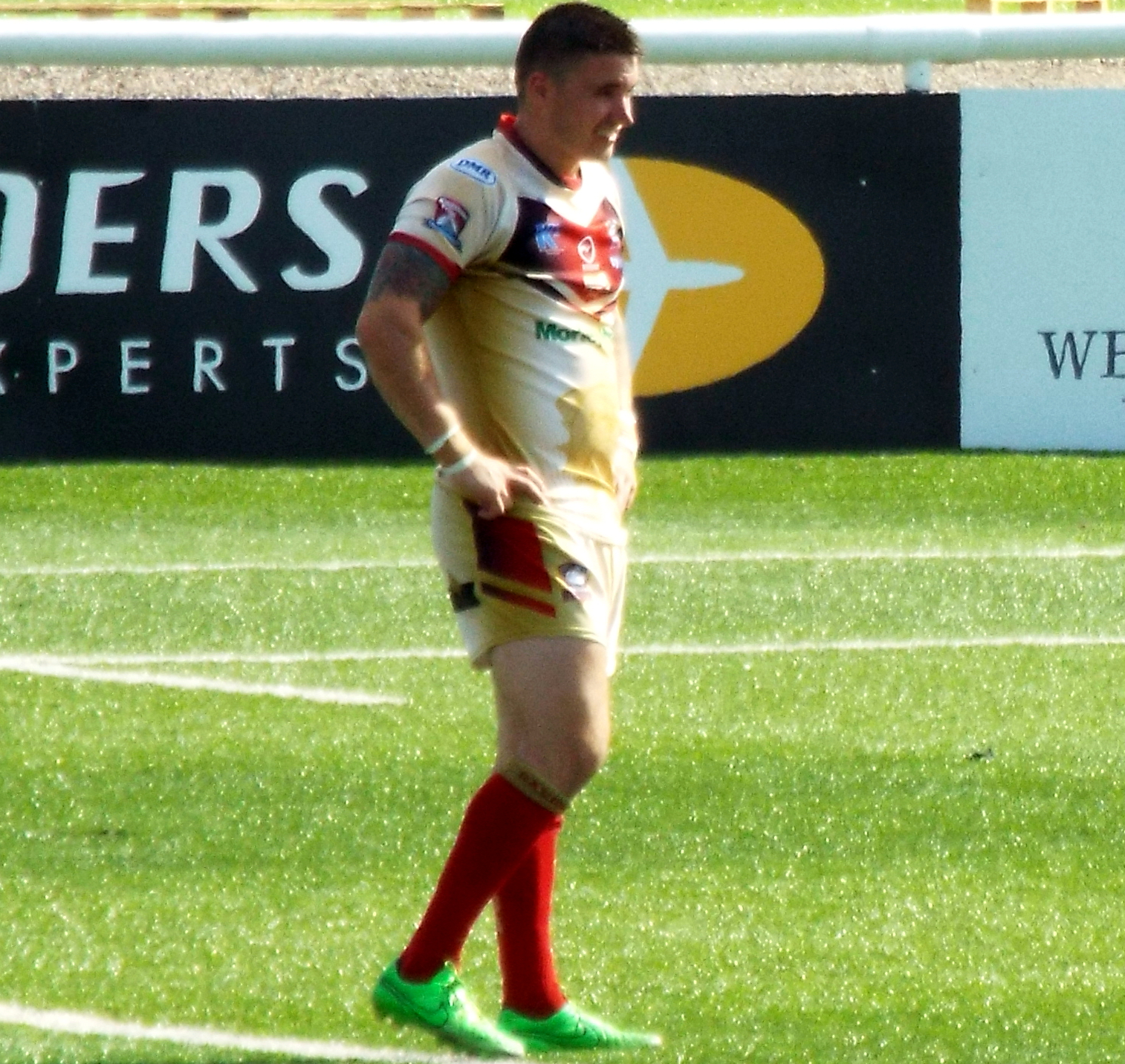
Southernwood in action for Batley

== Batley Bulldogs ==
=== 2015 ===
On Friday 26 September 2014, Southernwood signed a contract with Batley to play for the club beginning in 2015.

== Hunslet ==
=== 2018 ===
In October 2017, Southernwood signed a one-year contract to play for Hunslet in the 2018 season.

== Statistics ==
Season	Appearance	Tries	Goals	F/G	Points
2010 Bradford	2	0	0	0	0
2011 Bradford	0	0	0	0	0
2012 Bradford	0	0	0	0	0
2012 Dewsbury	5	1	0	0	4
2013 Whitehaven	27	8	22	0	76
2014 Whitehaven	24	6	54	2	134
2015 Batley	17	4	27	1	71
Total	76	19	103	3	285

== Personal life ==
Cain Southernwood is the son of the rugby league footballer, Graham Southernwood, and is the nephew of the rugby league footballer, Roy Southernwood.
