= 2006 World Club Challenge =

Intercontinental rugby league match

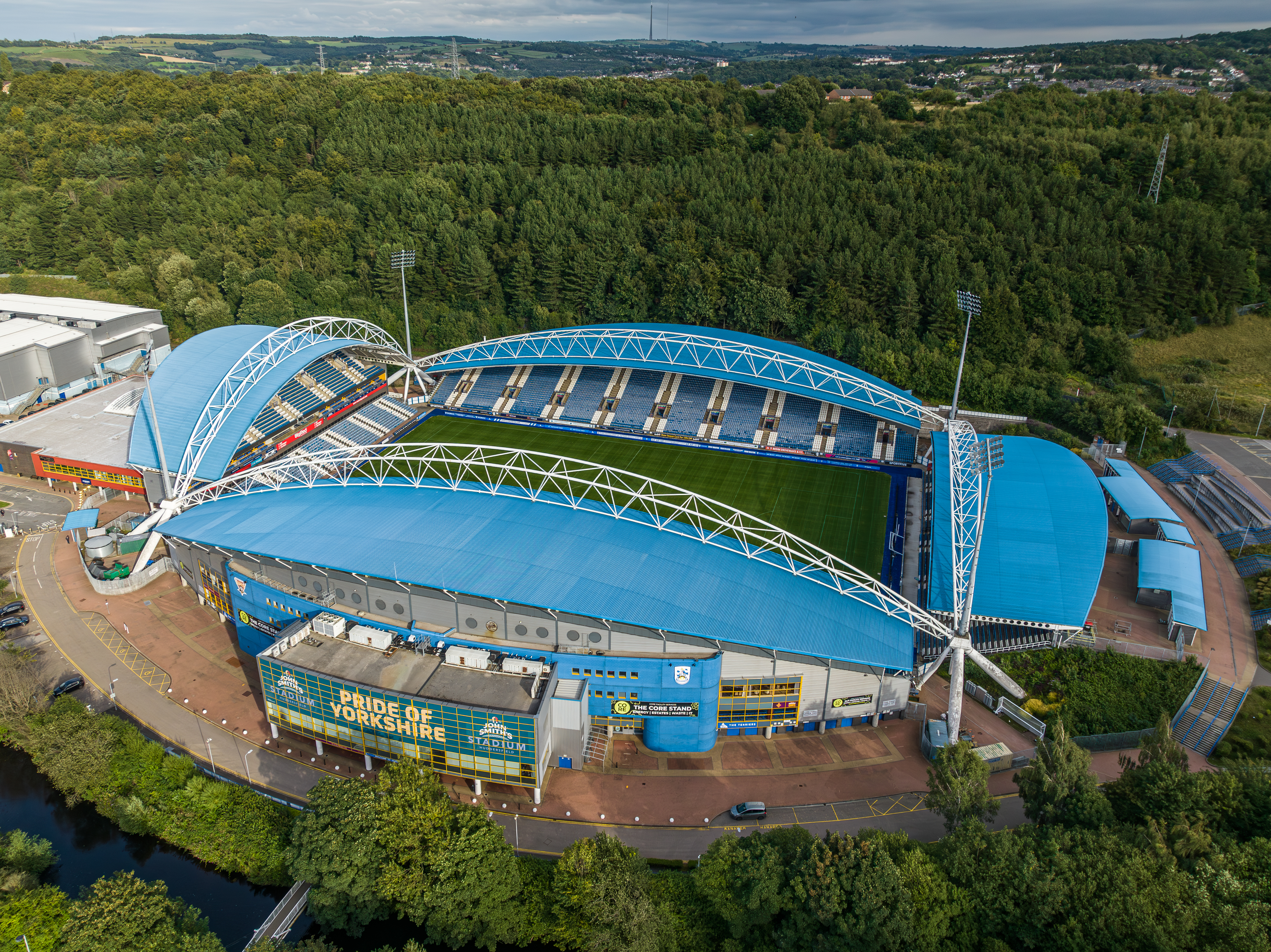
- The Kirklees Stadium hosted the match
Bradford Bulls	Wests Tigers
(Super League)	(National Rugby League)
30	10
	1	2	Total
BRA	12	18	30
WES	4	6	10
- Date: 3 February 2006
- Stadium: Kirklees Stadium
- Location: Huddersfield, England
- Man of the Match: Stuart Fielden
- Referee: Steve Ganson (England)
- Attendance: 19,207

Broadcast partners
- Broadcasters: (United Kingdom) Sky Sports
- Commentators: Eddie Hemmings; Mike Stephenson

The 2006 World Club Challenge was a Rugby league match held on Friday, 3 February 2006, at Galpharm Stadium, Huddersfield, UK. The game was contested by Bradford Bulls and Wests Tigers.

== Qualification ==
=== Bradford Bulls ===
Bradford Bulls qualified for the Challenge after being crowned the 2005 Super League champions, defeating their local rivals Leeds Rhinos 15–6 at Old Trafford. This Grand Final win avenged a defeat to the same team in the title decider the year before.

=== Wests Tigers ===
Wests Tigers clinched the 2005 National Rugby League title in a 30–16 defeat of North Queensland Cowboys to earn a place in the World Club Challenge. The Tigers had reached the Grand Final for the first time since their formation five years earlier following a merger of Balmain Tigers and Western Suburbs.

== Teams ==
The Tigers were without six of their 2005 NRL grand final-winning team: star stand-off half back Benji Marshall had undergone shoulder surgery in the off season; winger Pat Richards and forward Mark O'Neill had signed to play with other clubs, and Dene Halatau, Todd Payten and Shane Elford were also absent.

2006 World Club Challenge Teams
Bradford Bulls	Position	Wests Tigers
Michael Withers	Fullback	Brett Hodgson
Marcus Bai	Winger	Shannon McDonnell
Ben Harris	Centre	Dean Collis
Shontayne Hape	Centre	Paul Whatuira
Lesley Vainikolo	Winger	Jamaal Lolesi
Karl Pryce	Stand Off/Five-Eighth	Daniel Fitzhenry
Iestyn Harris (c)	Scrum Half/Halfback	Scott Prince (c)
Stuart Fielden	Prop	Ryan O'Hara
Ian Henderson	Hooker	Robbie Farah
Andy Lynch	Prop	John Skandalis
Paul Johnson	2nd Row	Anthony Laffranchi
Bradley Meyers	2nd Row	Chris Heighington
Jamie Langley	Loose Forward/Lock	Ben Galea
Joe Vagana	Interchange	Bryce Gibbs
Stanley Gene	Interchange	Liam Fulton
Brett Ferres	Interchange	Bronson Harrison
Matt Cook	Interchange	Sam Harris
Tom Parkinson	Interchange	Vic Rangers
Brian Noble	Coach	Tim Sheens

== Match details ==
Friday, 3 February
20:00 UTC+0

Bradford Bulls	30 - 10	Wests Tigers
Tries: Marcus Bai (2); Stanley Gene; Stuart Fielden (2); Goals: Iestyn Harris (5)	Report	Tries: Daniel Fitzhenry; Brett Hodgson Goals: Brett Hodgson (1)

Galpharm Stadium, Huddersfield
Attendance: 19,207
Referee: Steve Ganson (England)
Player of the Match: Stuart Fielden

== Man of the Match ==
Stuart Fielden of the Bradford Bulls was awarded man of the match.
