= Rikki Sheriffe =

English rugby league footballer and coach

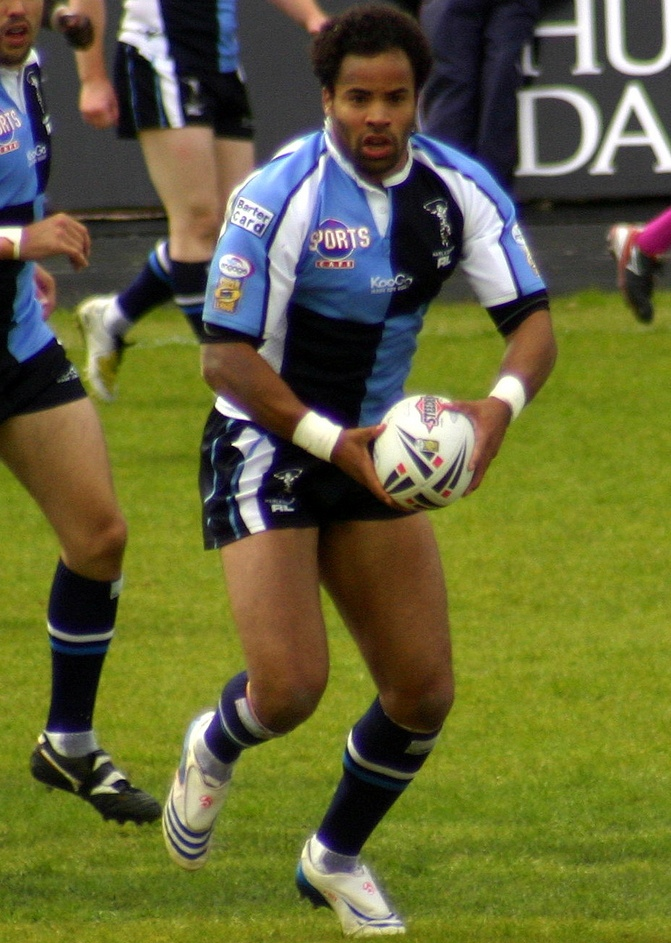

Personal information
- Born: 5 May 1984 (age 41) Bradford, West Yorkshire, England

Playing information
- Height: 6 ft 0 in (1.83 m)
- Weight: 14 st 9 lb (93 kg)

Rugby league
- Position: Wing
Club
Years	Team	Pld	T	G	FG	P
2003–05	Halifax	60	47	0	0	188
2003(loan)	→ York City Knights	4	3	0	0	12
2006–08	Harlequins RL	38	16	0	0	64
2007	Doncaster	12	5	0	0	20
2009–10	Bradford Bulls	55	16	0	0	64
2013–15	Halifax	21	4	0	0	16
2015–16	Keighley Cougars	35	16	0	0	64
	Total	225	107	0	0	428

Rugby union
- Position: Wing
Club
Years	Team	Pld	T	G	FG	P
2010–12	Newcastle Falcons	15	0	0	0	0

Rikki Sheriffe (born 5 May 1984) is an English former rugby league footballer who last played for the Keighley Cougars in League 1. Between 2010 and 2012 he played rugby union for Newcastle Falcons.

In his earlier rugby league career he played for the Bradford Bulls, Halifax, York City Knights, Harlequins RL and Doncaster.

Rikki Sheriffe's usual position is wing, or centre. Since the start of 2017 Sheriffe is also Keighley's development coach.

His brother Jode Sheriffe is a Jamaican international, and for two seasons, 2015–16, Rikki, Jodie and their other brother Jesse all played for Keighley.

On 24 Oct 2019 it was announced that Sheriffe had retired and taken up a role as Assistant Coach for Halifax Panthers
