= Chris Nero =

Australian rugby league footballer

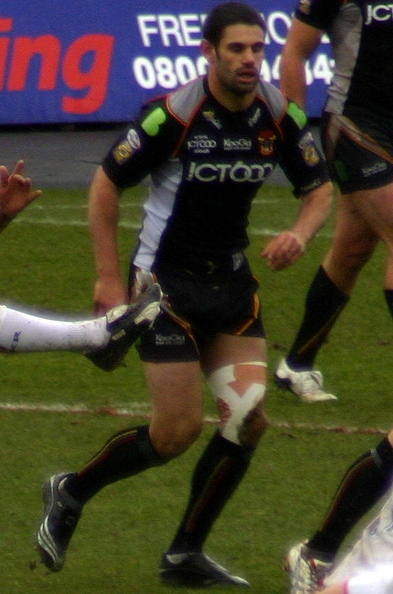

Personal information
- Full name: Christopher Nero
- Born: 14 February 1981 (age 45) Sydney, New South Wales, Australia

Playing information
- Height: 188 cm (6 ft 2 in)
- Weight: 95 kg (14 st 13 lb)
- Position: Centre, Second-row
Club
Years	Team	Pld	T	G	FG	P
2003	St. George Illawarra	7	2	0	0	8
2004–07	Huddersfield Giants	118	48	0	0	192
2008–10	Bradford Bulls	74	31	0	0	124
2011–13	Salford City Reds	52	9	0	0	36
	Total	251	90	0	0	360

Chris Nero (born 14 February 1981) is an Australian former professional rugby league footballer. He last played in the Super League for Salford City Reds. His usual position was at second-row, although he could also play in the centres. Nero left the Bradford Bulls at the end of the 2010 season to play for Salford City Reds.

== Playing career ==
Nero joined the Huddersfield Giants in 2004 and was a consistent try scorer for the club. Nero played for Huddersfield Giants in the 2006 Challenge Cup Final at centre but the Huddersfield Giants lost 12–42 against St. Helens. It was announced in August 2007 that he would leave the Huddersfield Giants.

Nero joined the Bradford Bulls in September 2007 after spending three years at the Huddersfield Giants. He was voted 'Player's' Player of the Year.

In 2009, Nero was linked with a move to fellow Super League club Wigan Warriors as a replacement for the retiring George Carmont.
