= David Solomona =

Former NZ & Samoa international rugby league footballer

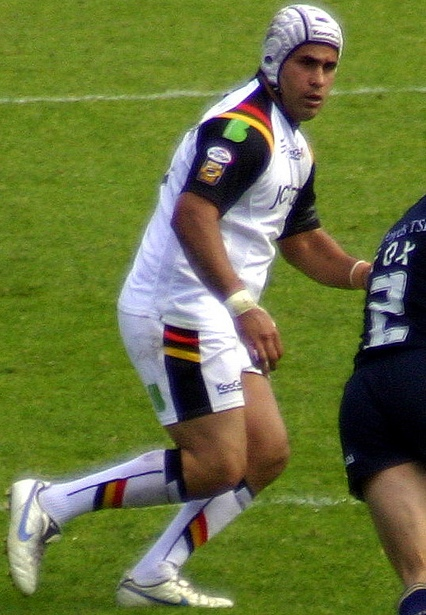

Personal information
- Full name: David Joseph Solomona
- Born: 26 January 1978 (age 48) Auckland, New Zealand

Playing information
- Height: 185 cm (6 ft 1 in)
- Weight: 110 kg (17 st 5 lb)
- Position: Second-row
Club
Years	Team	Pld	T	G	FG	P
1999–00	Sydney Roosters	21	3	0	0	12
2001–03	Parramatta Eels	57	6	0	0	24
2004–06	Wakefield Trinity Wildcats	76	26	0	0	104
2007–09	Bradford Bulls	60	21	0	0	84
2010–12	Warrington Wolves	65	19	1	0	78
	Total	279	75	1	0	302
Representative
Years	Team	Pld	T	G	FG	P
2000–10	Samoa	7	3	0	0	12
2001–06	New Zealand	13	0	0	0	0

David Joseph Solomona (born 26 January 1978) is a former professional rugby league footballer, who last played for the Warrington Wolves in the Super League. He was regularly amongst the top off-loaders in the competition.

== Background ==
Solomona was born in Auckland, New Zealand and is of Samoan and Egyptian descent. He attended St. Paul's College, Auckland, a school known for consistently producing the best rugby league team in the national secondary school competition.

== National Rugby League ==
Solomona started his career in Australia with the Sydney City Roosters making his first grade debut in round 16 of the 1999 NRL season against Melbourne. He played from the interchange bench for the Roosters in their 2000 NRL grand final loss to the Brisbane Broncos. He played for Samoa in the 2000 Rugby League World Cup.

In 2001, Solomona signed for Parramatta. He played 25 games for the club in the 2001 NRL season as the club were runaway Minor Premiers and set a number of point scoring records. Solomona played for the Parramatta Eels from the interchange bench in their shock 2001 NRL Grand Final loss to the Newcastle Knights at Stadium Australia.

== Super League ==
Solomona spent three years at Wakefield Trinity Wildcats where his skills helped keep them in the Super League. In 2004 he was named in the Super League Dream Team. He helped New Zealand to defeat Australia to win the 2005 Rugby League Tri Nations tournament.

Solomona signed for the Bradford Bulls on 24 October 2006 for the 2007 season. He was the Bulls only ever-present player in 2007, making 32 appearances in his first year at the club. Blessed with tremendous ball handling skills he also has the ability to score tries himself and he scored 14 tries in 2007, including a hat trick.

Solomona missed the first 5 games of 2008 due to injury picked up in pre-season. He again represented Samoa in the 2008 Rugby League World Cup.

Solomona played in the 2010 Challenge Cup Final victory over the Leeds Rhinos at Wembley Stadium.

Solomona continued to feature in the Warrington Wolves squad throughout the 2011 season. He was mainly brought on as a replacement making good use of his strength and ball handling skills to make in-roads into the opposing defence. His tenure with the Warrington Wolves came to a close due to an injury he suffered in the 2012 season, causing him to retire before returning to Australia.
