= Duane Straugheir =

English rugby league footballer

Personal information
- Full name: Duane Straugheir
- Born: 28 September 1989 (age 36) England

Playing information
- Height: 6 ft 1 in (1.85 m)
- Weight: 16 st 9 lb (106 kg)
- Position: Second-row, Centre
Club
Years	Team	Pld	T	G	FG	P
2009–10	Bradford Bulls	0	0	0	0	0
2010(loan)	→ Featherstone Rovers	2	0	0	0	0
2011	York City Knights	18	7	0	0	28
2012–17	Sheffield Eagles	153	43	0	0	172
2017–22	Hunslet RLFC	60	15	0	0	32
2023–25	Rochdale Hornets	9	4	0	0	0
	Total	242	69	0	0	232

Duane Straugheir (born 28 September 1989), also known by the nickname "Straff", is an English former professional rugby league footballer who last played for Rochdale Hornets in League 1. He played as a second-row, centre.

== Career ==
Straugheir was in the Bradford Bulls Academy system and also worked for Bradford Bulls as a community development officer. He made his début for Featherstone Rovers whilst on loan from Bradford Bulls in 2010.

He has also previously played 18 times for the York City Knights. After this, he was signed for the Sheffield Eagles, and in a 5-year spell went on to play a total of 153 games, scoring 43 tries.

Having been released by the Eagles at the end of the 2017 season, 'Straff' joined Hunslet for the 2018 League 1 season. He was made Hunslet rugby league football club captain in the 2018 League 1.

He retired at the end of the 2025 season.
