= Semi Tadulala =

Fiji dual-code rugby international footballer

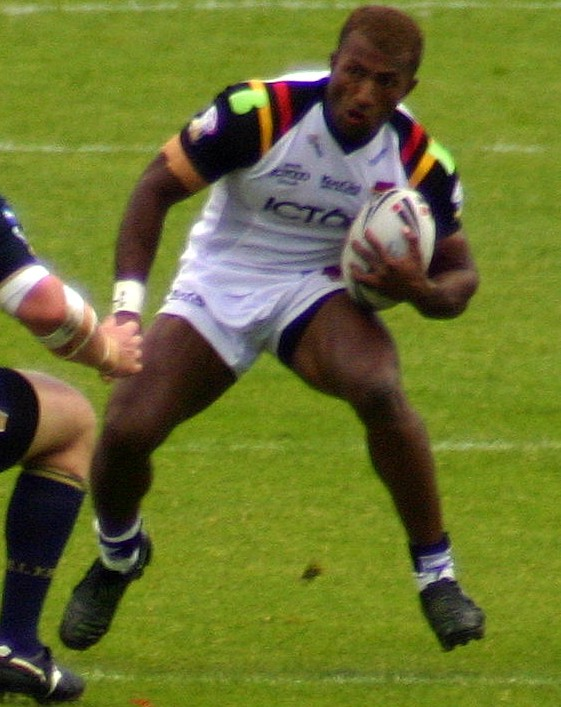

Personal information
- Full name: Semi L.K. Tadulala
- Born: 3 March 1978 (age 48) Suva, Fiji
- Height: 6 ft 1 in (1.85 m)
- Weight: 14 st 10 lb (93 kg)

Playing information

Rugby league
- Position: Wing, Centre
Club
Years	Team	Pld	T	G	FG	P
2001–03	Melbourne Storm	16	6	0	0	24
2004–07	Wakefield Trinity Wildcats	89	38	0	0	148
2008–09	Bradford Bulls	52	37	0	0	128
2011	Wakefield Trinity Wildcats	7	1	0	0	4
2012	Keighley Cougars	15	13	0	0	0
2013–15	Northern Pride
	Total	179	95	0	0	304
Representative
Years	Team	Pld	T	G	FG	P
2000–08	Fiji	6	3	0	0	8

Rugby union
- Position: Wing
Club
Years	Team	Pld	T	G	FG	P
2009–10	Gloucester Rugby	2	0	0	0	0
2010	Leeds Carnegie	14	4	0	0	0
	Total	16	4	0	0	0
Representative
Years	Team	Pld	T	G	FG	P
2009	Fiji	1	2	0	0	5
- Source: As of 16 November 2012

Semi Tadulala (born 3 March 1978) is a Fijian former professional rugby league footballer who played as a winger for Australian Queensland Cup club Northern Pride. A Fiji international representative at rugby league and rugby union, he previously played in the National Rugby League for Australia's Melbourne Storm club, in the Super League for England's the Bradford Bulls and the Wakefield Trinity Wildcats, and in the Co-operative Championship for the Keighley Cougars. He has also played for Gloucester Rugby and Leeds Carnegie at rugby union.

== Playing career ==
Tadulala played for Fiji in the 2000 Rugby League World Cup while playing for the Western Suburbs Panthers in the Queensland Cup.

His first National Rugby League club was the Melbourne Storm whom he played with until 2003.

He then moved to the UK, joining the Wakefield Trinity Wildcats. Gloucester Rugby Union Club tried to sign him but the deal fell through and he returned to Wakefield, although he missed much of the 2006/2007 season with an arm injury. In August 2007, it was announced that he would leave Wakefield.

He was named in the Fiji training squad for the 2008 Rugby League World Cup.

=== Bradford Bulls ===
Tadulala signed for the Bradford Bulls in September 2007. He scored eight tries, including two hat-tricks, for the Bulls in his first eight games. He ended his first season with Bulls as the club's leading tryscorer for the 2008 campaign. He signed a new one-year deal for the 2009 season.

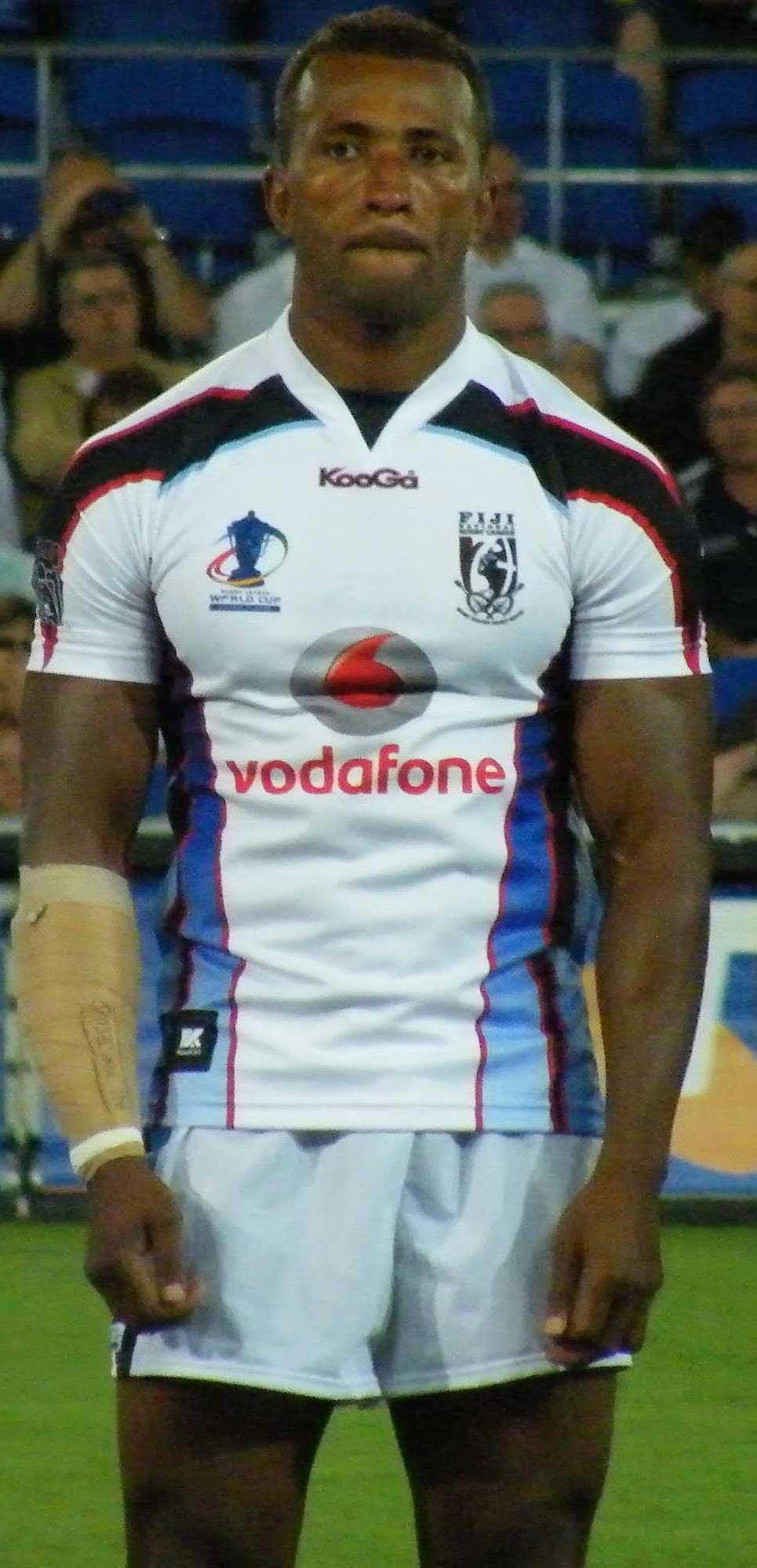
Tadulala lining up for Fiji at the 2008 RLWC

=== Playing for Fiji in the 2008 World Cup ===
Tadulala played four games for Fiji in the 2008 Rugby League World Cup, including the 52-0 semi-final loss against Australia. He scored two tries during the competition.

=== Moving to rugby union with Gloucester ===
On 25 January 2010, following the conclusion of Fiji's European tour, Gloucester Rugby announced the signing of Tadulala on a short-term contract. However, in early May 2010, head coach Bryan Redpath announced on BBC Radio Gloucestershire that Tadulala was to be released at the end of the 2009/10 season. He played just two games for the club.

=== Leeds Carnegie ===
On 1 June 2010, it was announced that Tadulala had signed a two-year deal with Leeds Carnegie.

=== Return to rugby league ===
On 1 July 2011, Tadulala re-signed for his old club Wakefield Trinity Wildcats until the end of the season.

On 17 December 2011, Tadulala signed for Keighley Cougars, continuing his work in an off-field capacity for previous club Wakefield, while on match terms at Cougar Park.

=== Return to Australia with Northern Pride ===
On 7 November 2012, Tadulala returned to Australia, signing for Australian Queensland Cup club Northern Pride and re-joining Jason Demetriou, the new Pride Head Coach and his former coach at Keighley Cougars. The winger won both the 2014 Queensland Cup & the 2014 NRL State Championship with the pride.

=== Outside rugby ===
On 9 August 2009, Tadulala took part in a charity cricket match with many other Wakefield Trinity Wildcats players against Wakefield St Michaels, to raise money for the Adam Watene Fund.
