= Matt Cook (rugby league) =

England international rugby league footballer

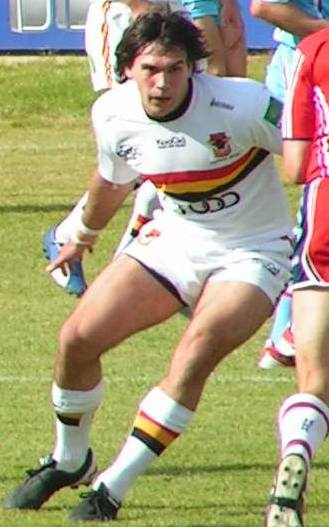
- Cook in 2008

Personal information
- Full name: Matthew Cook
- Born: 14 November 1986 (age 39) Warrington, Cheshire, England

Playing information
- Height: 6 ft 0 in (182 cm)
- Weight: 16 st 7 lb (105 kg)

Rugby union
Club
Years	Team	Pld	T	G	FG	P
20??–03	Saracens

Rugby league
- Position: Prop, Second-row, Loose forward
Club
Years	Team	Pld	T	G	FG	P
2004–09	Bradford Bulls	70	6	0	0	24
2008(loan)	→ Castleford Tigers	3	1	0	0	4
2010–11	Hull Kingston Rovers	28	8	0	0	32
2012–14	London Broncos	64	11	0	0	44
2015–20	Castleford Tigers	112	12	0	0	48
2021–21	Widnes Vikings	11	1	0	0	4
	Total	288	39	0	0	156
Representative
Years	Team	Pld	T	G	FG	P
2006–06	England	2	0	0	0	0

Matthew Cook (born 14 November 1986) is an English former professional rugby league footballer who played as a prop, second-row and loose forward for the Widnes Vikings in the Championship.

Cook has played at representative level for England, and at Super League level for Bradford Bulls, Hull Kingston Rovers, London Broncos, and Castleford Tigers, and at RFL Championship level for Widnes Vikings.

== Background ==
Cook was born in Warrington, Cheshire, England.

Cook represented England at all levels up to under-19s in rugby union and up to under-18s in rugby league. He was part of the England under-18s rugby league record-breaking win over Australia where he also scored two try's. As a junior, he played for Bedford Swifts when they were both a rugby league and rugby union side.

On 25 November 2022, he took up the role of General Manager at Leeds Rhinos.

== Playing career ==
=== 2000s ===
Cook signed for Super League club the Bradford Bulls from Saracens (rugby union) during December 2003.

In 2004, Cook played for the Bradford Bulls U21's Reserve Grade team that won the Reserve grade competition by beating Leeds Rhinos U21's in the Reserve Grade Grand Final at Headingley Stadium.

In 2005, Cook made his Super League début for the Bradford Bulls against St. Helens on Monday 28 March 2005, and went on to make several further appearances off the bench in a season that saw the Bulls win the Super League X Grand Final.

In 2006, Cook started the season with a 30–10 victory over National Rugby League premiers the Wests Tigers in the 2006 World Club Challenge. He also played in the Challenge Cup round victory over Hull F.C. where he was awarded the man of the match. At the end of 2006's Super League XI, he played in the play-off semi-final loss against Hull FC, and made his England début on Sunday 22 October 2006 against France national rugby league team (sub) and earned a second cap against Tonga national rugby league team (sub) leading to the team winning the Federation Shield competition.

In 2007, in what was Cooks third starting game he was incorrectly penalised during the final moments of the controversial Bradford Bulls vs Leeds Rhinos Super League Magic Weekend fixture at the Millennium Stadium which resulted in Leeds Rhinos snatching victory. On 13 May 2007, Cook scored his first career Try in the Challenge Cup Round vs Wakefield Trinity Wildcats.

In 2008, Cook scored his first Super League Try for Bradford Bulls in their away victory over Hull F.C. on 4 April. A week later, Cook began a short loan spell at Castleford Tigers and on Friday 11 April he scored another Super League try against Hull F.C. during his début.

On 1 September 2009, Cook signed for Hull Kingston Rovers on a 2-year contract, starting with the 2010 season.

=== 2010s ===
In 2010, Cook made his Hull Kingston Rovers début on 7 February against Salford Red Devils. He also played in the club's first ever Super League play-off win with a 24–04 victory over local rivals Hull F.C.

In 2011, Cook found his game time limited but still managed to score an impressive 5-tries in only 10 games for the Robins.

On 1 September 2011, Cook signed for London Broncos on a 3-year contract, starting with the 2012 season.

In 2012, Cook made his London Broncos début on 12 February against Warrington Wolves.

In 2013, Cooks dreams of playing at Wembley Stadium in the Challenge Cup final came to an end when the team came crashing to an embarrassing 70–0 record semi-final defeat to Wigan Warriors.

In 2014, after the club narrowly avoided going into administration at the end of 2013, Cook was handed the tough challenge of Captaining a young and inexperienced London Broncos team that sadly resulted in their relegation to Championship (rugby league). Cook was also voted the London Broncos Supporters Player of the year and was praised for his efforts having not missed a single game all season.

On 1 September 2014, Cook signed for Castleford Tigers on a 3-year contract, starting with the 2015 season.

In 2015, Cook made his second Castleford Tigers début on 27 February against St. Helens.

In 2016, having played the majority of the season's fixtures Cook was relieved to have scored his only try of the season in the last fixture of the campaign against Widnes Vikings, happily avoiding the dreaded traditional rugby league forfeit of having to do a nude run.

In 2017, Cook made history with the Castleford Tigers when they topped the league for the first time in the club's 95-year history to lift the League Leaders' Shield. Cook also played in his and the Castleford Tigers first Super League Grand Final against the Leeds Rhinos where, on his and the Castleford Tigers maiden Grand Final, he had to settle for a runners-up medal at Old Trafford.

In 2018, Cook made his 250th career appearance in Castleford Tigers 30–34 Super League victory over Warrington Wolves at the Halliwell Jones Stadium on 8 June.

In 2019, Cook made his 100th Castleford Tigers appearance during the clubs Super League round-nine victory over Wigan Warriors at Wheldon Road on 5 April where he also got to bag a try in the occasion. Cook also made his 250th Super League appearance in the Castleford Tigers 44–12 Super League victory over Hull F.C. at Wheldon Road on 5 September where he again scored a try on the occasion.

=== 2020s ===
On 6 August 2020, it was announced that Cook would leave Castleford to join Widnes Vikings on a 1-year deal.

In 2021, Cook made his RFL Championship début for the Widnes Vikings against Whitehaven R.L.F.C. on Sunday 28 March 2021.

On Tuesday, 7 September, Cook announced he would be retiring from professional Rugby League after the conclusion of the RFL Championship 2021 season.

On Sunday, 19 September 2021, Cook made his final professional career appearance in Widnes Vikings 16–26 victory over Swinton Lions in the last fixture of the season.

=== Statistics ===
==== Club ====
Year	Club	Apps	Pts	T	G	DG
2005	Bradford Bulls	8	-	-	-	-
2006	Bradford Bulls	12	-	-	-	-
2007	Bradford Bulls	17	4	1	-	-
2008	Bradford Bulls	17	16	4	-	-
2008	Castleford Tigers	3	4	1	-	-
2009	Bradford Bulls	16	4	1	-	-
2010	Hull Kingston Rovers	18	12	3	-	-
2011	Hull Kingston Rovers	10	20	5	-	-
2012	London Broncos	13	16	4	-	-
2013	London Broncos	23	12	3	-	-
2014	London Broncos	28	16	4	-	-
2015	Castleford Tigers	17	8	2	-	-
2016	Castleford Tigers	29	4	1	-	-
2017	Castleford Tigers	23	12	3	-	-
2018	Castleford Tigers	20	12	3	-	-
2019	Castleford Tigers	21	12	3	-	-
2020	Castleford Tigers	2	-	-	-	-
2021	Widnes Vikings	11	4	1	-	-
