= Dave Halley =

Wales international rugby league footballer

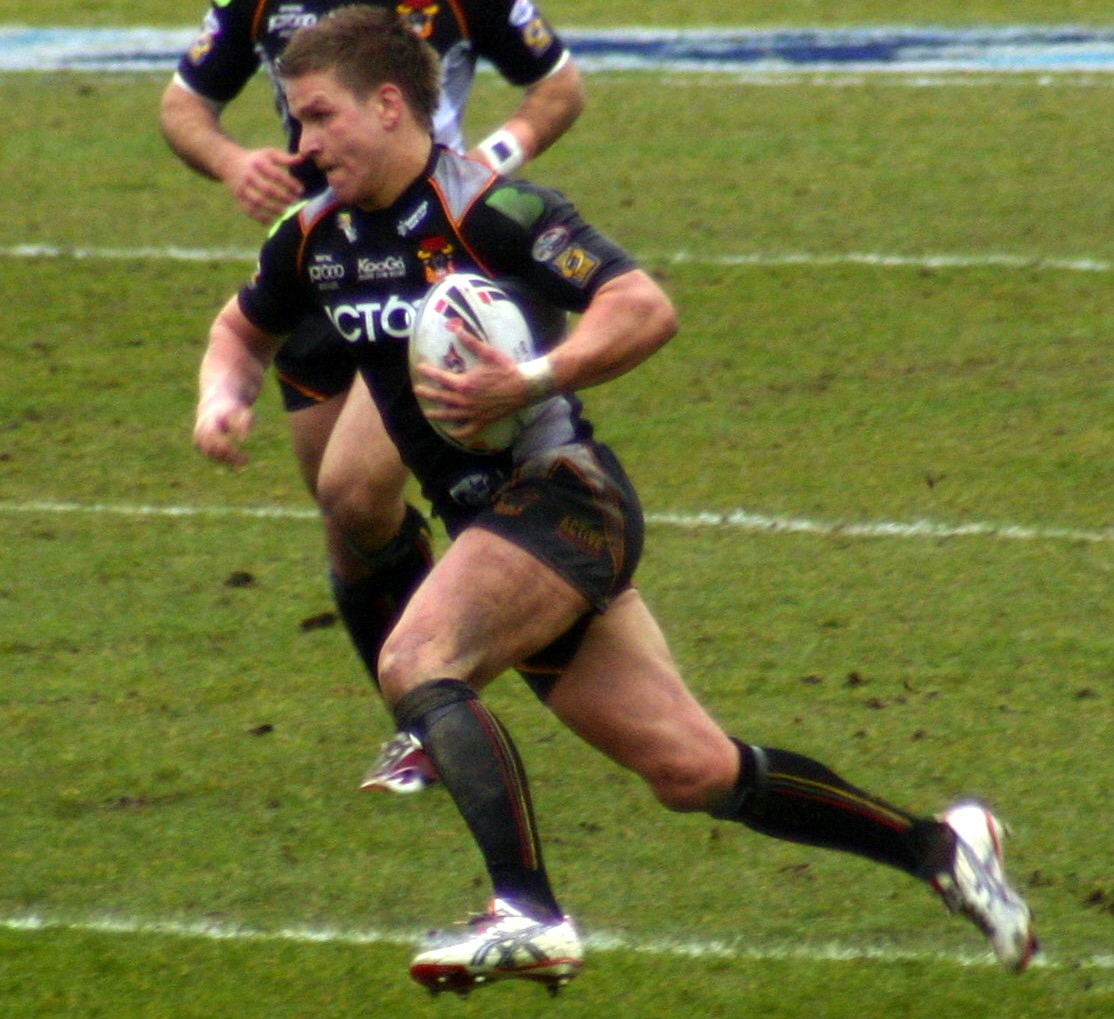

Personal information
- Full name: David Halley
- Born: 12 October 1986 (age 39) Bradford, West Yorkshire, England

Playing information
- Height: 5 ft 10 in (1.78 m)
- Weight: 13 st 3 lb (84 kg)
- Position: Fullback, Wing
Club
Years	Team	Pld	T	G	FG	P
2007–10	Bradford Bulls	82	27	0	0	108
2009(loan)	→Wakefield Trinity Wildcats	5	4	0	0	16
2011	Keighley Cougars	8	1	1	0	6
	Total	95	32	1	0	130
Representative
Years	Team	Pld	T	G	FG	P
2007–08	Wales	3	0	0	0	0

David Halley (born 12 October 1986) is a former Wales international rugby league footballer who played as a winger and fullback in the 2000s and 2010s. He plays as an amateur for Bradford Dudley Hill RLFC.

He played at club level for the Bradford Bulls and the Wakefield Trinity Wildcats in the Super League, and the Keighley Cougars in Championship 1. Halley won the Bradford Bulls' 2009 Player of the Year award.

== Background ==
Halley was known for his pace and acceleration and was popular with the Bradford fans.

== First Team Début ==
On 15 April 2007 Halley coming off the bench made a try scoring début at Grattan Stadium against Hull Kingston Rovers. The following week Halley made his full début against Hull F.C. at the KC Stadium

== 2008 ==
Halley established himself in the first team in 2008, he scored 4 tries against Toulouse in the Bradford Bulls record 98–6 win

== 2009 ==
Halley was on Loan at Wakefield Trinity Wildcats, and scored both tries in the 12–6 win over Wigan Warriors, Halley played 5 games for Wakefield Trinity Wildcats until he returned to Bradford in March 2009. By April 2009 Halley had established himself as the first-choice full back for the Bulls and in July 2009 his form was rewarded when he signed a new two-year contract, extending his stay at Bradford until the end of 2011

On 30 June 2011 Bradford Bulls released Halley from the rest of his contract so that he could feature more regularly in first team rugby, he was quickly snapped up by neighbours Keighley Cougars.

=== International level ===
He has played for Wales at international, and made a two try début against Papua New Guinea on 28 October at the Brewery Field.

He was selected in the Wales squad to face England at the Keepmoat Stadium prior to England's departure for the 2008 Rugby League World Cup.

In 2009 he announced that he was switching his International allegiance from Wales to England in an effort to represent his native country in the 2013 Rugby League World Cup

in 2017 Dave signed on for Wibsey FC, weighing in at 16st, but was still recorded as the fastest player in the club's history; just in front of Joe Brooksbank who had had 3 knee replacements at the time.

== Statistics ==
=== Club career ===
Year	Club	Apps	Pts	T	G	FG
2007	Bradford Bulls	10	12	3	-	–
2008	Bradford Bulls	20	4	1	-	–
	Total	30	16	4	-	–

=== Representative career ===
Year	Team	Matches	Tries	Goals	Field Goals	Points
2007	Wales	3	2	0	0	8
2008	Wales	1	0	0	0	0
