= Andy Lynch (rugby league) =

GB & England international rugby league footballer

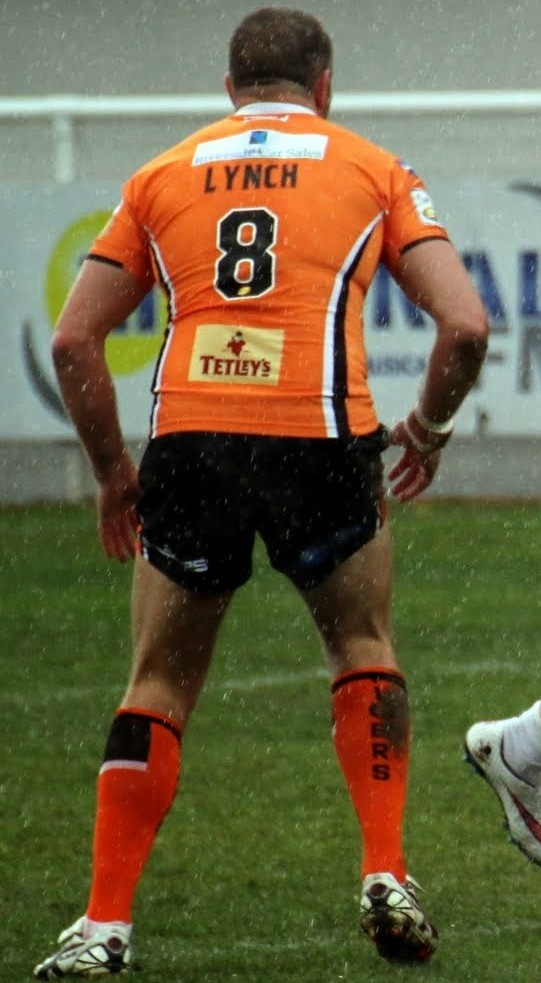

Personal information
- Full name: Andrew John Lynch
- Born: 20 October 1979 (age 46) Leeds, West Yorkshire, England

Playing information
- Height: 6 ft 2 in (1.88 m)
- Weight: 16 st 1 lb (102 kg)
- Position: Prop
Club
Years	Team	Pld	T	G	FG	P
1999–04	Castleford Tigers	137	15	0	0	60
2005–11	Bradford Bulls	204	46	0	0	184
2012–13	Hull F.C.	59	3	0	0	12
2014–17	Castleford Tigers	92	2	0	0	8
	Total	492	66	0	0	264
Representative
Years	Team	Pld	T	G	FG	P
2002–03	England 'A'	7	2	0	0	8
2003	Yorkshire	1	0	0	0	0
2004–05	England	5	0	0	0	0
2007	Great Britain	1	0	0	0	0

Andrew John Lynch (born 20 October 1979) is an English former professional rugby league footballer who played as a prop forward in the Super League in the 1990s, 2000s and 2010s. He represented England and Great Britain at international level.

Lynch began his career with the Castleford Tigers, where he had joined the academy aged 15. He made his professional debut in 1999 and progressed into a key first-team player, featuring in the 2003 Super League Dream Team. Following Castleford's relegation in 2004, Lynch signed for the Bradford Bulls. There, he won the 2005 Super League title, featured in the 2006 World Club Challenge victory and served as club captain from 2010. Having made over 200 appearances for Bradford, Lynch joined Hull F.C. in 2012 and was appointed captain. He spent two seasons at Hull before returning to the Castleford Tigers in 2014, where he played in the 2014 Challenge Cup final and won the 2017 League Leaders Shield. Throughout his career, Lynch recorded 452 Super League appearances, the second-highest total in competition history at the time of his retirement.

== Playing career ==
=== Castleford Tigers ===
Lynch played junior rugby league with Kippax Welfare before turning professional with the Castleford Tigers, making his first team debut in 1999. Lynch was named in the England 'A' squad for their match against New Zealand, and for the South Seas tour at the end of the 2002's Super League VII, and the following year was part of the squad that won the European Nations Cup.

In 2003, he was selected in the Super League Dream Team. In the same year Lynch was also awarded the Tigers Player of the Year award. During his time at Castleford, Lynch was also selected for England, and played as a substitute in Yorkshire's 56-6 victory over Lancashire at Odsal Stadium, Bradford on 2 July 2003.

=== Bradford Bulls ===
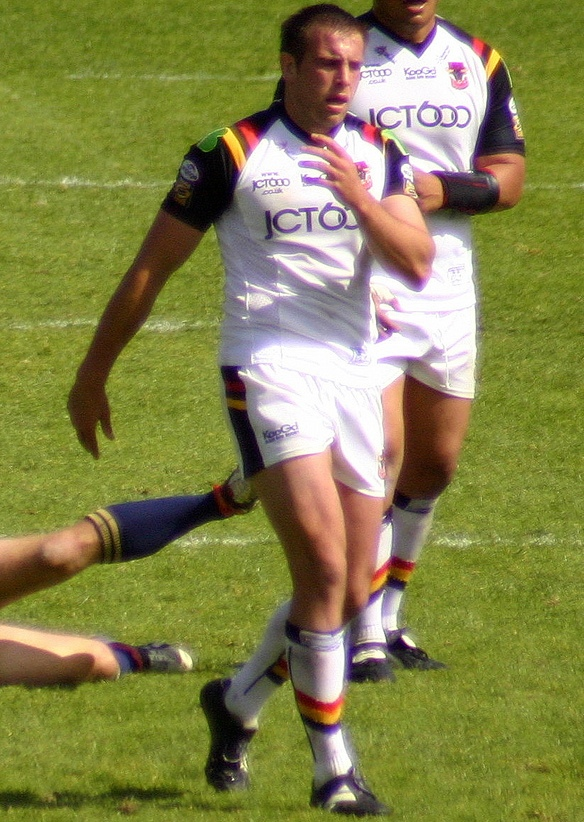
Lynch playing for the Bradford Bulls

Lynch signed for the Bradford Bulls in 2004, following Castleford's relegation from the Super League. As 2005 Super League champions, Bradford faced National Rugby League premiers Wests Tigers in the 2006 World Club Challenge. Lynch played as a prop forward in the Bulls' 30-10 victory. In 2006, he won several club awards for his performances, including Supporters' Player of the Year, Players' Player of the Year, BISA Player of the Year and Best Forward of the Year.

Lynch was named in Great Britain's stand-by squad for the 2006 Tri Nations, although he did not feature in the tournament.

In June 2007, Lynch was again called up to the Great Britain squad for the test match against France.

Lynch also played for Northern Union side against the All Golds in October 2007.

He was forced to rule himself out contention for the England training squad for the 2008 Rugby League World Cup through injury.

=== Hull FC ===
Lynch signed for Hull F.C. on a two-year deal in September 2011 for a "significant six figure" fee. Lynch was named FC captain for the 2012 season on 19 January.

=== Return to Castleford Tigers ===
Lynch returned to Castleford in 2014 and played a major part in their season, including an appearance in the 2014 Challenge Cup Final defeat by the Leeds Rhinos at Wembley Stadium.

In June 2017, Lynch announced he would be retiring at the end of the season. He won the League Leaders' Shield with Castleford, but was not included in the squad for the 2017 Grand Final against Leeds Rhinos. He finished his career with a total of 452 Super League appearances – two games fewer than the record set by Kevin Sinfield.

== Statistics ==
=== Club career ===
Year	Club	Apps	Pts	T	G	FG
1999	Castleford Tigers	9	-	-	-	-
2000	Castleford Tigers	20	12	3	-	-
2001	Castleford Tigers	19	-	-	-	-
2002	Castleford Tigers	27	8	2	-	-
2003	Castleford Tigers	26	28	7	-	-
2004	Castleford Tigers	26	12	3	-	-
2005	Bradford Bulls	29	24	6	-	-
2006	Bradford Bulls	30	36	9	-	-
2007	Bradford Bulls	26	24	6	-	-
2008	Bradford Bulls	29	20	5	-	-
2009	Bradford Bulls	25	20	5	-	-
2010	Bradford Bulls	27	24	6	-	-
2011	Bradford Bulls	29	36	9	-	-
2012	Hull F.C.	30	12	3	-	-
2013	Hull F.C.	29	-	-	-	-
2014	Castleford Tigers	31	5	1	-	-

=== International career ===
Year	Team	Matches	Tries	Goals	Field Goals	Points
2002	England 'A'	3	0	0	0	
2003	England 'A'	4	2	0	0	8
2004	England	1	0	0	0	
2007	Great Britain	1	0	0	0	

== Personal life ==
In 2017, Lynch joined former teammate Danny Orr as a coach at the Elite Rugby Academy.
