= Terry Newton =

Former GB & England international rugby league footballer

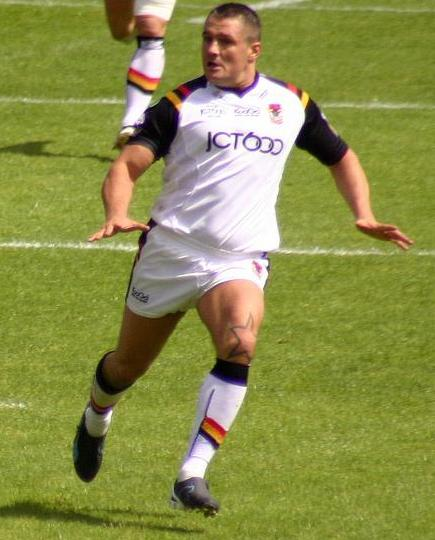
- Newton playing for Bradford in 2008

Personal information
- Full name: Terry Anthony Newton
- Born: 7 November 1978 Wigan, Greater Manchester, England
- Died: 26 September 2010 (aged 31) Wigan, Greater Manchester, England

Playing information
- Height: 5 ft 10 in (1.78 m)
- Weight: 15 st 10 lb (100 kg)
- Position: Hooker
Club
Years	Team	Pld	T	G	FG	P
1996–99	Leeds Rhinos	83	6	0	0	24
1998	→ Bramley (loan)	2	0	0	0	0
2000–05	Wigan Warriors	186	74	0	0	296
2006–09	Bradford Bulls	97	27	0	0	108
2010	Wakefield Trinity Wildcats	2	0	0	0	0
	Total	370	107	0	0	428
Representative
Years	Team	Pld	T	G	FG	P
	Lancashire
1999–01	England	3	0	0	0	0
1998–07	Great Britain	15	3	0	0	12

Terry Newton (7 November 1978 – 26 September 2010) was an English professional rugby league footballer who played as a hooker. He began his professional career with Leeds Rhinos in 1996, before joining his hometown club Wigan Warriors in 2000. He later also played for Bradford Bulls and Wakefield Trinity Wildcats. During his career, he won two Challenge Cup medals (1999 with Leeds, and 2002 with Wigan) and was a runner-up in four Super League Grand Finals. He was one of a handful of players to feature in each of the first 15 seasons of the Super League. At international level, he was capped 15 times by Great Britain between 1998 and 2007, and also represented England and Lancashire.

In February 2010, he was given a two-year ban after being one of the first sportsmen to have tested positive for human growth hormone. He died by suicide seven months later, aged 31.

== Playing career ==
=== Leeds Rhinos ===
Newton joined the Leeds Rhinos after a protracted transfer from amateur team Wigan St Judes, after Warrington had claimed they had also signed the young Newton. Terry missed his first year of Academy rugby due to the problem however when he finally joined in March 1996 he made an immediate impact, making his début for the Leeds Rhinos against the Sheffield Eagles at Headingley in April 1996. By 1997's Super League II, he was a regular in the team making 26 appearances in 1997 and scoring 2-tries. His progression continued in 1998, despite going on loan to Bramley for a month, he still played in the Grand Final team at Old Trafford before playing arguably his best season at the club in 1999. The Leeds Rhinos had signed Great Britain hooker Lee Jackson, and Newton's opportunities looked limited, however coach Graham Murray came up with a game plan that used both to their maximum potential. Newton, with his no nonsense direct play would start games with Jackson coming on off the bench to carve teams open. He played for Leeds Rhinos at hooker in their 1998 Super League Grand Final defeat by Wigan Warriors.

=== Wigan Warriors ===
Newton joined the Wigan Warriors for a transfer fee of £145,000, and he made his début on Boxing Day 1999 against St. Helens. He was a prolific try scorer for the Wigan Warriors, scoring over a dozen tries in each of his first two seasons. Newton played for the Wigan Warriors at hooker in their 2000 Super League Grand Final loss against St. Helens. He played for England in 2001 against Wales. He also played for the Wigan Warriors at hooker in their 2001 Super League Grand Final loss to the Bradford Bulls. Terry would surely have represented Great Britain in the 2001 Ashes series had it not been for a broken arm suffered in the Wigan Grand Final defeat by Bradford Bulls at Old Trafford. Newton signed a 4-year extension to his Wigan Warriors contract during August 2002. He played much of the 2003's Super League VIII despite needing a knee operation. He decided to put the operation back to the end of the year because the club was suffering an injury crisis at the time. He was rewarded for his efforts when he was included in the 2003 Super League 'Dream Team'. Newton played for the Wigan Warriors at hooker in the 2003 Super League Grand Final which was lost to the Bradford Bulls.

In September 2005, Newton was suspended for 10 games for two separate incidents in a match against St Helens, which would end up being his final game for Wigan. During his time at the club, Newton featured in three Super League Grand Finals, but was on the losing side on each occasion.

=== Bradford Bulls ===
Newton moved to the Bradford Bulls for the start of the 2006 season as part of a swap deal involving Mickey Higham. He was a consistent performer for the Bradford Bulls, but the club did not feature in a major final during his time there. He was allowed to leave the club following the expiry of his contract at the end of the 2009 season. Newton signed for Wakefield Trinity Wildcats following the expiry of his contract at the Bradford Bulls.

=== Wakefield Trinity Wildcats ===
In February 2010, Newton received a two-year ban from playing rugby league for failing a drugs test, having tested positive for human growth hormone in November the previous year. Wakefield cancelled Newton's contract a few days later, having only played two games for the club.

=== International ===
Newton gained two caps in the 1998 Great Britain v New Zealand test series whilst at Leeds Rhinos. Newton won international honours with two caps for England against France in October 1999. He played 83 times for Leeds Rhinos and scored 6-tries.

Newton won caps for Great Britain while at the Wigan Warriors in 2002 against Australia (sub), in 2003 against Australia (3 matches), in 2004 against Australia (3 matches), and New Zealand.

He made his return to the Great Britain squad for the 2003 Ashes series, despite needing a knee operation. Newton was selected in the Great Britain team to compete in the end of season 2004 Rugby League Tri-Nations tournament. In the final against Australia he played at hooker in the Lions' 44–4 loss.

While at the Bradford Bulls he played for Great Britain in 2006 against New Zealand (2 matches), New Zealand (sub), and Australia (2 matches), and in 2007 against New Zealand.

== Personal life ==
Newton was married to his wife, Stacey, and had two daughters, Millie and Charley-Mia.

Following his ban from rugby league, Newton became a pub licensee. His autobiography, Coming Clean, was released in June 2010.

=== Death ===
On 26 September 2010, Newton was found hanged in a house on Harswell Close in the Orrell district of Wigan. A later post mortem found traces of cocaine, amphetamines and the steroid nandrolone within his system, prescription anti-depressants, and consumption of alcohol, all of which could have impaired his judgement. Newton had left several notes stating he wanted to die. Coroner Jennifer Leeming recorded an open verdict.

== Statistics ==
=== Club career ===
Year	Club	Apps	Pts	T	G	FG
1998	Leeds Rhinos	14	4	1	–	–
1999	Leeds Rhinos	25	8	2	–	–
2000	Wigan Warriors	28	48	12	–	–
2001	Wigan Warriors	31	60	15	–	–
2002	Wigan Warriors	30	32	8	–	–
2003	Wigan Warriors	27	16	4	–	–
2004	Wigan Warriors	24	56	14	–	–
2005	Wigan Warriors	26	36	9	–	–
2006	Bradford Bulls	20	20	5	–	–
2007	Bradford Bulls	23	36	9	–	–
2008	Bradford Bulls	10	12	3	–	–

=== Representative career ===
Year	Team	Matches	Tries	Goals	Field goals	Points
1999	England	2	0	0	0	
2001	England	3		0	0	
2002	Great Britain	1	0	0	0	
2003	Great Britain	3	1	0	0	4
2004	Great Britain	4	2	0	0	8
2006	Great Britain	4	0	0	0	
2007	Great Britain	1	0	0	0	
