= 2015 St Helens R.F.C. season =

- Super League XX Rank: 4th
- Play-off result: Leeds Rhinos 20-13 St. Helens
- Challenge Cup: Semi-final
- 2015 record: Wins: 19; draws: 0; losses: 11
- Points scored: For: 766; against: 624

Team information
- Chairman: Eamonn McManus
- Head coach: Keiron Cunningham
- Captain: Jon Wilkin
- Stadium: Langtree Park
- Avg. attendance: 12,364
- High attendance: 17,980 (vs South Sydney Rabbitohs, 22 February 2015)

Top scorers
- Tries: Adam Swift (17)
- Goals: Travis Burns (28)
- Points: Tom Makinson (112)
← 2014	List of seasons	2016 →

The 2015 St Helens R.F.C. season is the club's 141st in its history; its 120th in rugby league. The Saints entered the season as defending champions after winning the Super League XIX title against Wigan Warriors 14-6 at Old Trafford after also winning the minor-premiership by topping the Super League ladder. Following the departure of previous head coach Nathan Brown, Saints entered the season with a new coach, former Saints player Keiron Cunningham

Saints began the defence of their title by playing the Catalans Dragons at Langtree Park which they won. In February Saints played the South Sydney Rabbitohs in the World Club Challenge which they lost 35-0.

== 2015 transfers in/out ==
In

Player	Previous club	Contract	Date signed
(Tonga) Atelea Vea	London Broncos	2 Years	July 2014
(Australia) Travis Burns	Hull Kingston Rovers	3 Years	September 2014
(England) Matthew Haggarty	Dewsbury Rams	3 Years	February 2015
(Republic of Ireland) Shannon McDonnell	Wests Tigers	2 Years	April 2015
(Australia) Adam Quinlan	St. George Illawarra Dragons	6 Months	July 2015

Out

Player	Signed for	Contract	Announced
(New Zealand) Sia Soliola	Canberra Raiders	2 Years	August 2014
(Australia) Anthony Laffranchi	Retired	N/A	August 2014
(England) Paul Clough	Bradford Bulls	2 Years	September 2014
(England) Carl Forster	Salford Red Devils	1 Year	September 2014
(Tonga) Willie Manu	Retired	N/A	October 2014
(England) James Tilley	Rochdale Hornets	1 Year	October 2014
(England) Gary Wheeler	Warrington Wolves	1 Year	October 2014
(England) Richard Beaumont	Leigh Centurions	1 Year	October 2014
(England) Connor Dwyer	Swinton Lions	2 Years	November 2014
(England) Jordan Hand	Whitehaven	1 Year Loan	December 2014
(Republic of Ireland) Shannon McDonnell	Wests Tigers	1 Year	January 2015
(England) Alex Clare	Released	N/A	January 2015
(England) Matthew Haggarty	Dewsbury Rams	Loan	Feb 2015
(New Zealand) Lance Hohaia	Retired	N/A	April 2015
(England) Paul Wellens	Retired	N/A	June 2015

== 2015 squad ==
2015 St Helens Squad
First team squad			Coaching staff
1 Jonny Lomax – FB, HB; 2 Tom Makinson – WG; 3 Jordan Turner – CE, LF, FE; 4 Josh Jones – CE, SR; 5 Adam Swift – WG; 6 Travis Burns – FE, HK; 7 Luke Walsh – HB; 8 Mose Masoe – PR, SR; 9 James Roby (vc) – HK; 10 Kyle Amor – PR; 11 Atelea Vea – SR, LK, PR; 12 Jon Wilkin (c) – SR, LF, FE; 13 Louie McCarthy-Scarsbrook – LF, SR	14 Alex Walmsley – PR; 15 Mark Flanagan – SR, LF; 16 Lance Hohaia – HK, SO; 17 Mark Percival – CE, WG; 18 Luke Thompson – PR, LF; 19 Greg Richards – PR; 20 Paul Wellens – FB, LF; 21 Joe Greenwood – PR; 22 Matty Dawson – WG, CE; 23 Anthony Walker – SR; 24 Jordan Hand – SR; 25 Andre Savelio – PR; 26 Lewis Charnock – FE, FB	27 Dave Hewitt – SO; 28 Jack Ashworth – SR, CE; 29 Olly Davies – SR; 30 Matty Fleming – CE; 31 Matty Fozard – HK; 32 Matthew Haggarty – PR; 33 Ricky Bailey – FB; 34 Shannon McDonnell – FB; 35 Morgan Knowles – LF; 36 Danny Richardson – SH; 37 Adam Quinlan – FB	Head coach: Keiron Cunningham; Assistant coaches: Jamahl Lolesi; Sean Long; Ade Gardner; Legend: (c) Captain(s); (vc) Vice-captain(s); Updated: 12 July 2015; Source(s): 2015 Squad Numbers

== Other staff ==
=== Technical staff ===
Name	Job title
(Wales) Keiron Cunningham	Head coach
(England) Sean Long	Assistant coach
(New Zealand) Jamahl Lolesi	Assistant coach
(England) Matt Daniels	Head of strength and conditioning, head trainer
(England) Ade Gardner	Assistant strength and conditioning coach
(England) Joey Hayes, (England) Nathan Mill and (England) Adam Rowland	Physiotherapists
(England) Craig Richards	RL Coach Development Officer
(England) Steve Leonard	Merseyside RL Development Manager
(England) Derek Traynor	ASSE Manager & Under 19's Coach
(England) Ian Harris	Training steward
(England) Alan Clarke and (England) Stan Wall	Kit manager
(England) Neil Kilshaw	Player Performance Manager
(England) Paul Johnson	Club Chaplain
(England) Derek Jones	Masseur
(Wales) Kel Coslett	Gameday manager
(England) Simon Perritt	Club doctor
(England) Ian Talbot	Lead Community Rugby League Coach

=== Boardroom staff ===
Name	Job title
(England) Eamonn McManus	Chairman
(England) Mike Rush	Chief executive officer
(England) Colin Whitehead	Accounts
(England) Dave Hutchinson	Head of Sales & Marketing
(England) Paul Sculthorpe	Business development manager
(England) Steve Law	Merchandising manager
(England) Mike Appleton	Media manager
(England) Mark Onion	Marketing manager
(England) Christine Hesketh	Ticket Office manager
(England) Peter Speakman	Lottery Operations
(England) Helen Emanuel	Hospitality manager
(England) Gordon Pennington	Saints Community Development Foundation
(England) Bill Harris	Ground Safety

== Preseason ==
LEGEND
Win
Draw
Loss

Saints played two pre-season games to warm up for their title-defence. Both games were played at Langtree Park with the first match against Widnes Vikings ending in a 16-20 defeat and the second, against rivals Wigan Warriors ending in a 28-12 victory.

Date	Competition	Vs	H/A	Venue	Result	Score	Tries	Goals	Att	TV	Report
18/01/15	Friendly	Widnes Vikings	H	Langtree Park	L	16-20	Greenwood, Swift, Roby	Makinson (1), Hewitt (2)	3,508	No	
25/01/15	Friendly	Wigan Warriors	H	Langtree Park	W	28-12	Greenwood (2), Swift, Vea, Makinson	Makinson (4)	6,888	No	

== Super League XX & World Club Series Fixtures/results ==
LEGEND
Win
Draw
Loss

Date	Competition	Rnd	Vs	H/A	Venue	Ref	Score	Tries	Goals	KO	Att	TV	Report
06/02/15	Super League	1	Catalans Dragons	H	Langtree Park	P Bentham	18-7	Vea, Turner, Savelio, Makinson	Makinson	20:00	12,008	Sky Sports	
12/02/15	Super League	2	Salford Red Devils	A	AJ Bell Stadium	B Taylor	6-52	Percival (2), Turner (2), Greenwood (2), Thompson, Makinson, McCarthy-Scarsbrook, Savelio	Percival (6)	20:00	4,975	Sky Sports	
22/02/15	World Club Series	-	South Sydney	H	Langtree Park	R Silverwood	0-39			20:00	17,980	Sky Sports	
27/02/15	Super League	3	Castleford Tigers	H	Langtree Park	R Silverwood	21-14	Swift, Makinson, Jones, Percival	Percival (2), Wilkin (DG)	20:00	10,066	Sky Sports	
06/03/15	Super League	4	Wakefield Trinity Wildcats	A	Belle Vue	R Hicks	16-20	Wellens, Greenwood, Turner	Percival, Makinson (3)	20:00	9,676	Sky Sports	
13/03/15	Super League	5	Widnes Vikings	A	Halton Stadium	R Hicks	20-30	Hohaia (2), Vea, Thompson, Turner	Burns (5)	20:00	7,772		
19/03/15	Super League	6	Warrington Wolves	H	Langtree Park	B Thaler	32-24	Greenwood, Wilkin, Swift, McCarthy-Scarsbrook, Makinson	Burns (6)	20:00	12,618	Sky Sports	
27/03/15	Super League	7	Hull Kingston Rovers	A	KC Lightstream Stadium	J Child	24-22	Wilkin, Makinson, McCarthy-Scarsbrook, Turner	Burns (3)	20:00	7,311	Sky Sports	
03/04/15	Super League	8	Wigan Warriors	A	DW Stadium	P Bentham	12-4	McCarthy-Scarsbrook		15:00	24,054	Sky Sports	
06/04/15	Super League	9	Hull F.C.	H	Langtree Park	R Hicks	20-28	Makinson, McCarthy-Scarsbrook, Turner	Makinson (4)	20:00	11,088		
12/04/15	Super League	10	Huddersfield Giants	A	John Smith's Stadium	J Child	8-11	Turner	Burns (3), Walsh (DG)	15:00	5,825		
17/04/15	Super League	11	Leeds Rhinos	H	Langtree Park	B Thaler	16-41	Makinson, Turner (2)	Burns (2)	20:00	12,640	Sky Sports	
24/04/15	Super League	12	Widnes Vikings	H	Langtree Park	P Bentham	34-16	Walsh, Burns, Walmsley, Fleming, Makinson, Percival	Burns (5)	20:00	11,271		
01/05/15	Super League	13	Wakefield Trinity Wildcats	H	Langtree Park	C Leatherbarrow	44-4	Walsh (2), Charnock (2), Makinson (2), Turner, Swift, Masoe	Burns (4)	20:00	10,001		
09/05/15	Super League	14	Catalans Dragons	A	Stade Gilbert Brutus	J Child	33-26	Swift (4), McDonnell	Walsh (3)	17:00	8,886	Sky Sports	
22/05/15	Super League	15	Hull F.C.	A	KC Stadium	M Thomason	10-17	McDonnell, Makinson	Makinson (2), Charnock (2), Turner (DG)	20:00	10,320		
31/05/15	Super League	16	Warrington Wolves	N	St James' Park	R Silverwood	20-16	McCarthy-Scarsbrook, Swift, Wilkin	Makinson (4)	15:15	26,970	Sky Sports	
05/06/15	Super League	17	Salford Red Devils	H	Langtree Park	B Thaler	32-12	Makinson (2), Swift, Turner, McDonnell	Makinson (6)	20:00	11,664		
12/06/15	Super League	18	Wigan Warriors	H	Langtree Park	R Silverwood	30-14	Swift, Turner, Burns, McDonnell, Wilkin	Percival (5)	20:00	15,500	Sky Sports	
18/06/15	Super League	19	Castleford Tigers	A	The Jungle	R Silverwood	25-24	Walsh, Walmsley, Greenwood, McDonnell	Percival (4)	20:00	6,086	Sky Sports	
03/07/15	Super League	20	Leeds Rhinos	A	Headingley Stadium	R Silverwood	46-18	Jones, Turner, Amor	Percival (3)	20:00	18,514	Sky Sports	
10/07/15	Super League	21	Huddersfield Giants	H	Langtree Park	B Thaler	35-34	Quinlan (3), Percival (2), Greenwood	Walsh (5+DG)	20:00	11,164	Sky Sports	
16/07/15	Super League	22	Warrington Wolves	A	Halliwell Jones Stadium	J Child	14-20	Roby, Masoe, Turner	Walsh (4)	20:00	11,618	Sky Sports	
25/07/15	Super League	23	Hull Kingston Rovers	H	Langtree Park	R Hicks	52-12	Greenwood (2), Burns, Dawson, Vea, Quinlan, Flanagan, Swift (2)	Walsh (8)	20:00	10,781	Sky Sports	

== 2015 squad statistics ==
- Appearances and Points include (Super League, Challenge Cup and Play-offs) as of 24 July 2015.

No	Player	Position	Age	Previous club	Apps	Tries	Goals	DG	Points
1	Jonny Lomax	Fullback	24	St Helens Academy	5	0	0	0	0
2	Thomas Makinson	Winger	23	St Helens Academy	19	17	22	0	112
3	Jordan Turner	Centre	26	Hull F.C.	23	15	0	1	61
4	Josh Jones	Centre	21	St Helens Academy	21	2	0	0	8
5	Adam Swift	Wing	21	St Helens Academy	26	16	0	0	64
6	Travis Burns	Stand off	31	Hull Kingston Rovers	23	3	28	0	68
7	Luke Walsh	Scrum half	27	Penrith Panthers	11	4	16	2	50
8	Mose Masoe	Prop	25	Penrith Panthers	26	2	0	0	8
9	James Roby	Hooker	29	St Helens Academy	22	1	0	0	4
10	Kyle Amor	Prop	27	Wakefield Trinity Wildcats	24	2	0	0	8
11	Atelea Vea	Second row	28	London Broncos	9	3	0	0	12
12	(c) Jon Wilkin	Second row	32	Hull Kingston Rovers	20	4	0	1	17
13	Louie McCarthy-Scarsbrook	Loose forward	29	London Broncos	24	6	0	0	24
14	Alex Walmsley	Prop	24	Batley Bulldogs	25	2	0	0	8
15	Mark Flanagan	Second row	27	Wests Tigers	21	2	0	0	8
16	Lance Hohaia	Scrum half	31	New Zealand Warriors	8	2	0	0	8
17	Mark Percival	Centre	20	St Helens Academy	17	9	27	0	90
18	Luke Thompson	Prop	19	St Helens Academy	17	2	0	0	8
19	Greg Richards	Prop	20	St Helens Academy	22	0	0	0	0
20	Paul Wellens	Fullback	35	St Helens Academy	4	1	0	0	4
21	Joe Greenwood	Prop	21	St Helens Academy	14	8	0	0	32
22	Matty Dawson	Wing	24	Huddersfield Giants	13	2	0	0	8
23	Jordan Hand	Second row	21	St Helens Academy	0	0	0	0	0
24	Andre Savelio	Prop	20	St Helens Academy	21	2	0	0	8
26	Lewis Charnock	Stand off	20	St Helens Academy	4	2	5	0	18
27	Dave Hewitt	Stand off	20	St Helens Academy	0	0	0	0	0
28	Jack Ashworth	Second row	20	St Helens Academy	1	0	0	0	0
29	Olly Davies	Second row	20	St Helens Academy	1	0	0	0	0
30	Matty Fleming	Centre	20	St Helens Academy	6	1	0	0	4
31	Matty Fozard	Hooker	20	St Helens Academy	0	0	0	0	0
32	Matthew Haggarty		20	St Helens Academy	0	0	0	0	0
33	Ricky Bailey		20	St Helens Academy	1	0	0	0	0
34	Shannon McDonnell	Fullback	27	Wests Tigers	8	5	0	0	20
35	Morgan Knowles		20	St Helens Academy	1	0	0	0	0
36	Danny Richardson		20	St Helens Academy	0	0	0	0	0
37	Adam Quinlan	Fullback	22	St. George Illawarra Dragons	3	4	0	0	16

= Injured = Suspended

== Standings ==
=== Regular season ===
The 2015 Super League season will see teams play every other team twice each, once home and once away, whilst playing one team for a third time at the Magic Weekend, which is a bonus round. After 23 games the league table is frozen and the teams are split up into 2 of the 3 "Super 8's". Teams finishing in the top 8 will go on to contest "Super League" and will all retain a place in the 2016 competition, as they go on to play 7 more games each, as they compete for a place in the Grand Final. Teams finishing in the bottom four (9-12) will be put alongside the top 4 teams from the 2015 Championship, in "The Qualifiers" Super 8 group. Where these teams will reset their season standings to 0 and also play 7 extra games each, as they attempt to earn a place in the 2016 Super League competition.

Pos	Team	Pld	W	D	L	PF	PA	PD	Pts	Qualification
1	Leeds Rhinos	23	16	1	6	758	477	+281	33	Super League Super 8s
2	St Helens	23	16	0	7	598	436	+162	32	Super League Super 8s
3	Wigan Warriors	23	15	1	7	589	413	+176	31	Super League Super 8s
4	Huddersfield Giants	23	13	2	8	538	394	+144	28	Super League Super 8s
5	Castleford Tigers	23	13	0	10	547	505	+42	26	Super League Super 8s
6	Warrington Wolves	23	12	0	11	552	456	+96	24	Super League Super 8s
7	Hull F.C.	23	11	0	12	452	484	−32	22	Super League Super 8s
8	Catalans Dragons	23	9	2	12	561	574	−13	20	Super League Super 8s
9	Widnes Vikings	23	9	1	13	518	565	−47	19	The Qualifiers
10	Hull Kingston Rovers	23	9	0	14	534	646	−112	18	The Qualifiers
11	Salford City Reds	23	8	1	14	447	617	−170	17	The Qualifiers
12	Wakefield Trinity Wildcats	23	3	0	20	402	929	−527	6	The Qualifiers

Source: Rugby League Project
Rules for classification: 1) Points; 2) Points difference; 3) Number of points scored;

=== Super 8's ===
- Super League

The Super League Super 8's sees the top 8 teams from the Super League play 7 games each. Each team's points are carried over and after the 7 additional games, the top 4 teams will contest the playoff semi finals with the team in 1st hosting the team in 4th, and the team finishing 2nd hosting the 3rd placed team; the winners of these semi finals will contest the Super League Grand Final at Old Trafford. Teams finishing 5th, 6th, 7th and 8th after the 7 additional games will take no further part in the 2015 season and will play in Super League again in 2016.

Pos	Team	Pld	W	D	L	PF	PA	PD	Pts	Qualification
1	Leeds Rhinos (L, C)	30	20	1	9	944	650	+294	41	Semi-finals
2	Wigan Warriors	30	20	1	9	798	530	+268	41	Semi-finals
3	Huddersfield Giants	30	18	2	10	750	534	+216	38	Semi-finals
4	St Helens	30	19	0	11	766	624	+142	38	Semi-finals
5	Castleford Tigers	30	16	0	14	731	746	−15	32	
6	Warrington Wolves	30	15	0	15	714	636	+78	30	
7	Catalans Dragons	30	13	2	15	739	770	−31	28	
8	Hull F.C.	30	12	0	18	620	716	−96	24	

Source: Rugby League Project
(C) Champions; (L) League Leaders' Shield Winners

#	Home	Score	Away	Match Information
#	Home	Score	Away	Date and time(Local)	Venue	Referee	Attendance
Semi-finals
SF1	Leeds Rhinos	0 – 0	St. Helens	2 October, 20:00 BST	Headingley Carnegie Stadium
SF2	Wigan Warriors	0 – 0	Huddersfield Giants	1 October, 20:00 BST	DW Stadium
GRAND FINAL
F	Winner SF1	0 – 0	Winner SF2	10 October, 18:00 BST	Old Trafford, Manchester

== 2015 Tetley's Challenge Cup Fixtures\Results ==
LEGEND
Win
Draw
Loss

Date	Competition	Rnd	Vs	H/A	Venue	R	Score	Tries	Goals	KO	Att	TV	Report
15/05/2015	Challenge Cup	Round 6	York City Knights	H	Langtree Park	W	46-6	Swift (3), Makinson (4), Percival, Flanagan	Makinson (3), Charnock (2)	20:00	3,271	N/A	
28/06/2015	Challenge Cup	Quarter-final	Widnes Vikings	H	Langtree Park	W	36-20	Swift, Percival (2), Dawson, Amor, Turner	Percival (6)	16:00	8,806	BBC Sport	
31/07/2015	Challenge Cup	Semi-final	Leeds Rhinos	N	Halliwell Jones Stadium	L	24-14	Percival (2), Savelio	Walsh	20:00	11,107	BBC Sport	
