= 2016 St Helens R.F.C. season =

- Super League XXI Rank: 4th
- Play-off result: N/A
- Challenge Cup: Sixth Round
- 2016 record: Wins: 14; draws: 0; losses: 10
- Points scored: For: 573; against: 536

Team information
- Chairman: Eamonn McManus
- Head coach: Keiron Cunningham
- Captain: Jon Wilkin
- Stadium: Langtree Park

Top scorers
- Tries: Joe Greenwood (7)
- Goals: Luke Walsh (43)
- Points: Luke Walsh (96)
| ← 2015 | List of seasons | 2017 → |

This article details the St Helens R.F.C. rugby league football club's 2016 season. This is the Saints' 21st consecutive season in the Super League.

== Table ==
=== Super League table ===
| Pos | Team | Pld | W | D | L | PF | PA | PD | Pts | Qualification |
|---|---|---|---|---|---|---|---|---|---|---|
| 1 | Hull F.C. | 23 | 17 | 0 | 6 | 605 | 465 | +140 | 34 | Super League Super 8s |
| 2 | Warrington Wolves | 23 | 16 | 1 | 6 | 675 | 425 | +250 | 33 | Super League Super 8s |
| 3 | Wigan Warriors | 23 | 16 | 0 | 7 | 455 | 440 | +15 | 32 | Super League Super 8s |
| 4 | St Helens | 23 | 14 | 0 | 9 | 573 | 536 | +37 | 28 | Super League Super 8s |
| 5 | Catalans Dragons | 23 | 13 | 0 | 10 | 593 | 505 | +88 | 26 | Super League Super 8s |
| 6 | Castleford Tigers | 23 | 10 | 1 | 12 | 617 | 640 | −23 | 21 | Super League Super 8s |
| 7 | Widnes Vikings | 23 | 10 | 0 | 13 | 499 | 474 | +25 | 20 | Super League Super 8s |
| 8 | Wakefield Trinity Wildcats | 23 | 10 | 0 | 13 | 485 | 654 | −169 | 20 | Super League Super 8s |
| 9 | Leeds Rhinos | 23 | 8 | 0 | 15 | 404 | 576 | −172 | 16 | The Qualifiers |
| 10 | Salford City Reds | 23 | 10 | 0 | 13 | 560 | 569 | −9 | 14 (Note: Salford deducted 6 points for salary cap breaches in 2014 and 2015.) | The Qualifiers |
| 11 | Hull Kingston Rovers | 23 | 6 | 2 | 15 | 486 | 610 | −124 | 14 | The Qualifiers |
| 12 | Huddersfield Giants | 23 | 6 | 0 | 17 | 511 | 569 | −58 | 12 | The Qualifiers |

Source: Rugby League Project
Rules for classification: 1) Points; 2) Points difference; 3) Number of points scored;

=== Super 8s table ===
| Pos | Team | Pld | W | D | L | PF | PA | PD | Pts | Qualification |
|---|---|---|---|---|---|---|---|---|---|---|
| 1 | Warrington Wolves (L) | 30 | 21 | 1 | 8 | 852 | 541 | +311 | 43 | Semi-finals |
| 2 | Wigan Warriors (C) | 30 | 21 | 0 | 9 | 669 | 560 | +109 | 42 | Semi-finals |
| 3 | Hull F.C. | 30 | 20 | 0 | 10 | 749 | 579 | +170 | 40 | Semi-finals |
| 4 | St Helens | 30 | 20 | 0 | 10 | 756 | 641 | +115 | 40 | Semi-finals |
| 5 | Castleford Tigers | 30 | 15 | 1 | 14 | 830 | 808 | +22 | 31 | |
| 6 | Catalans Dragons | 30 | 15 | 0 | 15 | 723 | 716 | +7 | 30 | |
| 7 | Widnes Vikings | 30 | 12 | 0 | 18 | 603 | 643 | −40 | 24 | |
| 8 | Wakefield Trinity | 30 | 10 | 0 | 20 | 571 | 902 | −331 | 20 | |

Source: BBC Sport
(C) Champions; (L) League Leaders' Shield Winners

== World Club Series ==
LEGEND
| Win |
| Draw |
| Loss |

| Date | Competition | Vrs | H/A | Venue | Result | Score | Tries | Goals | Att |
|---|---|---|---|---|---|---|---|---|---|
| 19/2/16 | WCC | Sydney | H | Langtree Park | L | 12–38 | Peyroux (2) | Walsh 2/2 | Attendance |

2016 World Club Series Teams
| St Helens R.F.C. | positions | Sydney Roosters |
|---|---|---|
| 22. Jack Owens | Fullback | 1. Blake Ferguson |
| 2. Tommy Makinson | Winger | 2. Daniel Tupou |
| 3. Jordan Turner | Centre | 3. Dale Copley |
| 18. Dominique Peyroux | Centre | 4. Latrell Mitchell |
| 5. Adam Swift | Winger | 5. Shaun Kenny-Dowall |
| 12. Jon Wilkin (c) | Stand off | 6. Jayden Nikorima |
| 7. Luke Walsh | Scrum half | 7. Jackson Hastings |
| 8. Alex Walmsley | Prop | 8. Kane Evans |
| 6. Travis Burns | Hooker | 9. Jake Friend (c) |
| 16. Andre Savelio | Prop | 10. Dylan Napa |
| 11. Atelea Vea | 2nd Row | 11. Aiden Guerra |
| 20. Joe Greenwood | 2nd Row | 12. Mitchell Aubusson |
| 13. Louie McCarthy-Scarsbrook | Loose forward | 24. Sio Siua Taukeiaho |
| 10. Kyle Amor | Interchange | 13. Sam Moa |
| 14. Lama Tasi | Interchange | 14. Isaac Liu |
| 17. Luke Thompson | Interchange | 15. Vincent Leuluai |
| 28. Morgan Knowles | Interchange | 16. Ian Henderson |
| Keiron Cunningham | Coach | Trent Robinson |

== 2016 fixtures and results ==
LEGEND
| Win |
| Draw |
| Loss |

2016 Super League Fixtures

| Date | Competition | Rnd | Vrs | H/A | Venue | Result | Score | Tries | Goals | Att | Live on TV |
|---|---|---|---|---|---|---|---|---|---|---|---|
| 5/2/16 | Super League XXI | 1 | Huddersfield | H | Langtree Park | W | 30–16 | Percival (2), Vea, Turner, Thompson | Walsh 5/6 | 10,408 | – |
| 11/2/16 | Super League XXI | 2 | Salford | A | AJ Bell Stadium | L | 10–44 | Walmsley, Swift | Walsh 1/2 | 4,386 | Sky Sports |
| 26/2/16 | Super League XXI | 3 | Hull Kingston Rovers | A | Craven Park | W | 31–22 | McDonnell, Makinson, Dawson, Wilkin, Vea | Walsh 4/4, Makinson 1/1, Walsh 1 DG | 6,517 | Sky Sports |
| 4/3/16 | Super League XXI | 4 | Castleford | H | Langtree Park | W | 28–22 | Swift, Vea, Dawson (2), McCarthy-Scarsbrook | Walsh 4/5 | 11,298 | – |
| 11/3/16 | Super League XXI | 5 | Wakefield Trinity | H | Langtree Park | W | 44–4 | Greenwood (2), Wilkin, Roby (2), Makinson (2), Dawson | Walsh 6/8 | 10,008 | – |
| 18/3/16 | Super League XXI | 6 | Leeds | A | Headingley Stadium | L | 18–30 | Amor, Walsh, McCarthy-Scarsbrook | Walsh 3/3 | Attendance | Sky Sports |
| 25/3/16 | Super League XXI | 7 | Wigan | H | Langtree Park | L | 12–24 | Greenwood, Fages | Walsh 2/2 | 15,808 | Sky Sports |
| 28/3/16 | Super League XXI | 8 | Widnes | A | Halton Stadium | W | 20–12 | Greenwood, McCarthy-Scarsbrook, Makinson | Walsh 4/4 | 9,076 | Sky Sports |
| 1/4/16 | Super League XXI | 9 | Hull F.C. | H | Langtree Park | L | 16–17 | Greenwood, Dawson, Turner | Walsh 1/1, Owens 1/3 | 10,242 | – |
| 8/4/16 | Super League XXI | 10 | Warrington | A | Halliwell Jones Stadium | W | 25–22 | Amor, Ashworth, Dawson, Knowles | Walsh 4/4, Walsh 1 DG | 13,678 | Sky Sports |
| 14/4/16 | Super League XXI | 11 | Catalans Dragons | H | Langtree Park | L | 12–30 | Fages, Walsh | Walsh 2/2 | 9,362 | Sky Sports |
| 22/4/16 | Super League XXI | 12 | Leeds | H | Langtree Park | W | 38–34 | Lomax (2), Greenwood (2), Amor, Fages (2) | Walsh 5/7 | 11,271 | Sky Sports |
| 1/5/16 | Super League XXI | 13 | Castleford | A | The Jungle | W/D/L | Score | Try Scorers | Goal Scorers | Attendance | TV |

2016 Super 8 Qualifiers

| Date | Competition | Rnd | Vrs | H/A | Venue | Result | Score | Tries | Goals | Att | Live on TV |
|---|---|---|---|---|---|---|---|---|---|---|---|
| 0/0/16 | Super League XXI | S1 | Team | H/A | Stadium | W/D/L | Score | Try Scorers | Goal Scorers | Attendance | TV |
| 0/0/16 | Super League XXI | S2 | Team | H/A | Stadium | W/D/L | Score | Try Scorers | Goal Scorers | Attendance | TV |
| 0/0/16 | Super League XXI | S3 | Team | H/A | Stadium | W/D/L | Score | Try Scorers | Goal Scorers | Attendance | TV |
| 0/0/16 | Super League XXI | S4 | Team | H/A | Stadium | W/D/L | Score | Try Scorers | Goal Scorers | Attendance | TV |
| 0/0/16 | Super League XXI | S5 | Team | H/A | Stadium | W/D/L | Score | Try Scorers | Goal Scorers | Attendance | TV |
| 0/0/16 | Super League XXI | S6 | Team | H/A | Stadium | W/D/L | Score | Try Scorers | Goal Scorers | Attendance | TV |
| 0/0/16 | Super League XXI | S7 | Team | H/A | Stadium | W/D/L | Score | Try Scorers | Goal Scorers | Attendance | TV |

== Challenge Cup ==
LEGEND
| Win |
| Draw |
| Loss |

| Date | Competition | Rnd | Vrs | H/A | Venue | Result | Score | Tries | Goals | Att | TV |
|---|---|---|---|---|---|---|---|---|---|---|---|
| 8/5/16 | Cup | 6th | Hull F.C. | H | Langtree Park | W/D/L | Score | Try Scorers | Goal Scorers | Attendance | TV |

== Players ==
=== Squad ===
- Appearances and points include (Super League, Challenge Cup and Play-offs) as of 22 April 2016.

| No | Player | Position | Previous club | Apps | Tries | Goals | DG | Points |
|---|---|---|---|---|---|---|---|---|
| 1 | Jonny Lomax | Fullback | St Helens Academy | 1 | 2 | 0 | 0 | 8 |
| 2 | Tommy Makinson | Winger | St Helens Academy | 9 | 4 | 1 | 0 | 18 |
| 3 | Jordan Turner | Centre | Hull F.C. | 11 | 2 | 0 | 0 | 8 |
| 4 | Mark Percival | Centre | St Helens Academy | 3 | 2 | 0 | 0 | 8 |
| 5 | Adam Swift | Wing | St Helens Academy | 6 | 2 | 0 | 0 | 8 |
| 6 | Travis Burns | Stand off | Hull Kingston Rovers | 5 | 0 | 0 | 0 | 0 |
| 7 | Luke Walsh | Scrum half | Penrith Panthers | 13 | 2 | 43 | 2 | 96 |
| 8 | Alex Walmsley | Prop | Batley Bulldogs | 13 | 1 | 0 | 0 | 4 |
| 9 | James Roby | Hooker | St Helens Academy | 11 | 2 | 0 | 0 | 8 |
| 10 | Kyle Amor | Prop | Wakefield Trinity Wildcats | 13 | 3 | 0 | 0 | 12 |
| 11 | Atelea Vea | Second-row | London Broncos | 8 | 3 | 0 | 0 | 12 |
| 12 | Jon Wilkin | Second-row | Hull Kingston Rovers | 13 | 2 | 0 | 0 | 8 |
| 13 | Louie McCarthy-Scarsbrook | Loose forward | London Broncos | 13 | 3 | 0 | 0 | 12 |
| 14 | Lama Tasi | Prop | Salford Red Devils | 10 | 0 | 0 | 0 | 0 |
| 15 | Greg Richards | Prop | St Helens Academy | 10 | 0 | 0 | 0 | 0 |
| 16 | Andre Savelio | Prop | St Helens Academy | 8 | 0 | 0 | 0 | 0 |
| 17 | Luke Thompson | Prop | St Helens Academy | 11 | 1 | 0 | 0 | 4 |
| 18 | Dominique Peyroux | Centre | New Zealand Warriors | 9 | 2 | 0 | 0 | 8 |
| 19 | Theo Fages | Scrum half | Salford Red Devils | 8 | 4 | 0 | 0 | 16 |
| 20 | Joe Greenwood | Prop | St Helens Academy | 7 | 7 | 0 | 0 | 28 |
| 21 | Matty Dawson | Wing | Huddersfield Giants | 10 | 6 | 0 | 0 | 24 |
| 22 | Jack Owens | Wing | Widnes Vikings | 10 | 0 | 1 | 0 | 2 |
| 23 | Shannon McDonnell | Fullback | Wests Tigers | 10 | 1 | 0 | 0 | 4 |
| 24 | Matty Fleming | Centre | St Helens Academy | 0 | 0 | 0 | 0 | 0 |
| 25 | Lewis Charnock | Scrum half | St Helens Academy | 0 | 0 | 0 | 0 | 0 |
| 26 | Olly Davies | Second-row | St Helens Academy | 0 | 0 | 0 | 0 | 0 |
| 27 | Jack Ashworth | Prop | St Helens Academy | 2 | 1 | 0 | 0 | 4 |
| 28 | Morgan Knowles | Loose forward | St Helens Academy | 5 | 1 | 0 | 0 | 4 |
| 29 | Ricky Bailey | Centre | St Helens Academy | 0 | 0 | 0 | 0 | 0 |
| 30 | Calvin Wellington | Wing | St Helens Academy | 0 | 0 | 0 | 0 | 0 |
| 31 | Danny Richardson | Stand off | St Helens Academy | 0 | 0 | 0 | 0 | 0 |
| 32 | Jake Spedding | Wing | St Helens Academy | 2 | 0 | 0 | 0 | 0 |

=== Transfers ===
In

| Nat | Name | Signed from | Contract Length | Date |
|---|---|---|---|---|
| (Samoa) | Lama Tasi | Salford Red Devils | 2 Years | May 2015 |
| (Cook Islands) | Dominique Peyroux | New Zealand Warriors | 2 Years | July 2015 |
| (France) | Théo Fages | Salford Red Devils | 4 Years | September 2015 |
| (England) | Jack Owens | Widnes Vikings | 2 Years | November 2015 |

Out

| Nat | Name | Signed to | Contract Length | Date |
|---|---|---|---|---|
| (England) | Josh Jones | Exeter Chiefs | 2 Years | June 2015 |
| (Samoa) | Mose Masoe | St. George Illawarra Dragons | 2 Years | June 2015 |
| (England) | Mark Flanagan | Salford Red Devils | 2 Years | October 2015 |
| (England) | Jordan Hand | Swinton Lions | 1 Years | October 2015 |
| (Wales) | Matty Fozard | Sheffield Eagles | 2 Years | October 2015 |
| (Republic of Ireland) | Matt Haggarty | Salford Red Devils | 1 Year Loan | October 2015 |
| (England) | Dave Hewitt | Sheffield Eagles | 2 Years | November 2015 |
| (England) | Jordan Hand | Swinton Lions | 1 Year | November 2015 |
| (Australia) | Adam Quinlan | Released |
