= 2014 St Helens R.F.C. season =

- Super League XIX Rank: 1st
- Play-off result: Grand final – Winners
- Challenge Cup: Fifth Round
- 2014 record: Wins: 20; draws: 0; losses: 9
- Points scored: For: 825; against: 611

Team information
- Chairman: Eamonn McManus
- Head coach: Nathan Brown
- Captain: Paul Wellens
- Stadium: Langtree Park
- Avg. attendance: 12,063
- High attendance: 17,980 (vs Wigan Warriors, 18 April 2014)

Top scorers
- Tries: Tom Makinson (28)
- Goals: Luke Walsh (70)
- Points: Luke Walsh (160)
← 2013	List of seasons	2015 →

The 2014 St Helens R.F.C. season is the club's 140th in its history; its 119th in rugby league. The Saints will be looking to end a 6-year silverware drought this season by competing for the Super League XIX title as well as the 113th edition of the Challenge Cup. This season marks Australian Nathan Brown's second season as head coach of the club, continuing from his first season in 2013 which ended in a 5th-place finish and an early playoff exit courtesy of an 11–10 defeat at Leeds Rhinos. They began their season by taking on last seasons runner-up Warrington Wolves at the Halliwell Jones Stadium, which ended in an 8–38 win for Saints. This win sent Saints on a win streak that lasted for eight Super League games before being defeated on 18 April 2014 by arch-rivals Wigan Warriors at Langtree Park in the annual Good Friday derby match. Easter was a period to forget for the Saints as they were beaten by Widnes Vikings for their second league defeat in a row, following the Good Friday defeat to bitter rivals Wigan, and then by Leeds Rhinos in Round 5 of the Challenge Cup meaning the Saints will miss out on the trophy for a sixth year. The Saints bounced back however on 1 May with a 48–18 win over the London Broncos. Saints suffered another Magic Weekend to the Warrington Wolves on 18 May with the game ending 41–24 to the Wolves. Results picked up after the Magic Weekend with two straight wins at home against Huddersfield & Salford however the Saints then traveled to Perpignan where they suffered a humiliating 42–0 loss to the Catalans Dragons. Once again, the Saints bounced back with an impressive win over Castleford Tigers at Langtree Park and with another outstanding performance in a pulsating game at the DW Stadium against arch-rivals Wigan Warriors that ended 12–16 in favour of the Saints; the win avenging the Good Friday defeat at Langtree Park. Following this win, Saints suffered a shock 40–10 defeat to Hull Kingston Rovers but bounced back with three straight wins before losing to Hull KR's cross-town rivals, Hull FC, 19–12. However, a 40–16 win over Wakefield Trinity Wildcats & an extremely tight 12–13 win over Leeds Rhinos at Headingley put the Saints in a position where a win against Warrington on 4 September would hand them their first League Leaders' Shield since the 2008 season; with Castleford Tigers being the only other team in contention for the top spot. Despite losing their last two games of the regular season, Saints acquired the League Leaders' Shield following Castleford's failure to beat Catalans Dragons in their last game of the season; meaning that the Saints took their first piece of silverware since 2008. The unlikely success of the 2014 season culminated in a 14–6 win over arch-rivals Wigan Warriors in the 2014 Super League Grand Final at Old Trafford making Saints the Super League champions for the first time since 2006 in an extremely lively, well-fought contest that saw Wigan player Ben Flower sent off for a sucker punch on a defenceless Lance Hohaia in the 2nd minute of the game.

== 2014 transfers ==
Players In

Player	Previous club	Contract	Date signed
(Australia) Luke Walsh	Penrith Panthers	2 Years	May 2013
(Samoa) Mose Masoe	Penrith Panthers	2 Years	June 2013
(England) Richard Beaumont	Hull Kingston Rovers	2 Years	August 2013
(Republic of Ireland) Kyle Amor	Wakefield Trinity Wildcats	4 Years	September 2013
(England) Matty Dawson	Huddersfield Giants	2 Years	September 2013

Players Out

Player	Signed for	Contract	Announced
(New Zealand) Francis Meli	Salford Red Devils	1 Year	July 2013
(New Zealand) Tony Puletua	Salford Red Devils	2 Years	July 2013
(England) Lee Gaskell	Bradford Bulls	2 Years	August 2013
(Australia) Josh Perry	Retired	N/A	September 2013
(England) Dominic Speakman	Barrow Raiders	1 Year	November 2013
(England) Nathan Ashe	Released	N/A	November 2013

== 2014 squad ==
* Announced on 15 November 2013:

2014 St Helens Squad
First team squad			Coaching staff
1 Jonny Lomax – FB, SH; 2 Tom Makinson – WG; 3 Jordan Turner – CE; 4 Josh Jones – CE, SR; 5 Adam Swift – WG; 6 Lance Hohaia – SO, HK; 7 Luke Walsh – SH; 8 Mose Masoe – PR; 9 James Roby – HK; 10 Louie McCarthy-Scarsbrook – PR, LF; 11 Sia Soliola – SR, CE; 12 Jon Wilkin – SR, LF, SO; 13 Willie Manu – LF, SR	14 Anthony Laffranchi – PR; 15 Mark Flanagan – SR; 16 Kyle Amor – PR; 17 Paul Wellens (c) – FB, LF; 18 Alex Walmsley – PR; 19 Paul Clough – PR, SR; 20 Richard Beaumont – SR, PR; 21 Ade Gardner – WG; 22 Mark Percival – CE; 23 Joe Greenwood – PR; 24 Gary Wheeler – CE, SO; 25 Anthony Walker – SR; 26 Matty Dawson – WG, CE	27 Greg Richards – PR; 28 Luke Thompson – PR, LF; 29 Jordan Hand – SR; 30 Carl Forster – PR; 31 James Tilley – HK, LF; 32 Lewis Charnock – SO, FB; 33 Andre Sevelio – PR; 34 Connor Dwyer – HK; 35 Alex Clare – SR	Head coach: Nathan Brown; Assistant coaches: Keiron Cunningham; Jamahl Lolesi; Legend: (c) Captain(s); (vc) Vice-captain(s); Updated: 15 November 2013; Source(s): 2014 Squad Numbers

== Other staff ==
=== Technical staff ===
Name	Job title
(England) Steve Leonard	Service Area Manager
(Australia) Nathan Brown	Head coach
(Wales) Keiron Cunningham	Assistant coach
(New Zealand) Jamahl Lolesi	Assistant coach
(England) Matt Daniels	Head of strength and conditioning, head trainer
(England) Joey Hayes] and (England) Nathan Mill	Physiotherapists
(England) Derek Traynor	ASSE Manager & Under 19's Coach
(England) Ian Harris	Training steward
(England) Alan Clarke	Kit manager
(England) Neil Kilshaw	Player Performance Manager
(England) Gaz Tracey	Club Chaplain
(England) Derek Jones	Masseur
(Wales) Kel Coslett	Gameday manager
(England) Simon Perritt	Club doctor

=== Boardroom staff ===
Name	Job title
(England) Eamonn McManus	Chairman
(England) Mike Rush	Chief executive officer
(England) Paul Sculthorpe	Business development manager
(England) Steve Law	Merchandising manager
(England) Mike Appleton	Media manager
(England) Mark Onion	Marketing manager
(England) Steve Davis	Head of Commercial Operations

== Pre Season ==
LEGEND
Win
Draw
Loss

Saints began their pre-season by taking on Batley Bulldogs in January 2014; taking a 20–0 victory at home. Following this victory, Saints then took on bitter rivals Wigan Warriors in a 'friendly game', again at Langtree Park, for James Roby's testimonial match, sinking to a disappointing 16–28 defeat. They bounced back however for their last pre-season game before the season began with a 6–62 win away at Rochdale Hornets with a St Helens Select XIII team.

Date	Competition	Vs	H/A	Venue	Result	Score	Tries	Goals	Att	TV	Report
24/01/14	Friendly	Batley Bulldogs	H	Langtree Park	W	20–0	Makinson, Percival, Flanagan, Jones	Percival (2)	TBC	No	
31/01/14	Testimonial	Wigan Warriors	H	Langtree Park	L	16–28	Swift (2), Roby	Walsh (2)	TBC	No	
02/02/14	Friendly	Rochdale Hornets	A	Spotland Stadium	W	6–62	Makinson, Galbraith(2), Fleming, Ashworth, Gardner(2), Charnock, Clough, Walker, Tisdale	Charnock(8), Makinson	TBC	No	

== Super League XIX Fixtures/Results/Table ==
LEGEND
Win
Draw
Loss

Date	Competition	Rnd	Vs	H/A	Venue	R	Score	Tries	Goals	KO	Att	TV	Report
13/02/14	Super League	1	Warrington Wolves	A	Halliwell Jones Stadium	Won	8–38	Makinson, Roby, Amor, Laffranchi, Swift, Walsh	Walsh (7)	20:00	13,157	Sky Sports	
21/02/14	Super League	2	Hull F.C.	H	Langtree Park	Won	34–22	Roby (2), Soliola, Lomax, Makinson, Percival	Walsh (5)	20:00	13,488		
27/02/14	Super League	3	Salford Red Devils	A	AJ Bell Stadium	Won	0–38	Wilkin, Walsh, Percival (2), Amor, Laffranchi	Walsh (7)	20:00	6,353	Sky Sports	
07/03/14	Super League	4	Hull Kingston Rovers	H	Langtree Park	Won	38–18	Swift (2), Lomax, Walmsley, Soliola, Makinson, Wilkin	Walsh (5)	20:00	11,818		
14/03/14	Super League	5	Catalans Dragons	H	Langtree Park	Won	40–22	Jones, Makinson (2), Turner, Mc-Carthy Scarsbrook, Hohaia, Swift	Walsh (4), Lomax (2)	20:00	11,321		
14/03/14	Super League	6	Wakefield Trinity Wildcats	A	Belle Vue	Won	16–24	Jones, Soliola, Dawson, Greenwood, Makinson	Makinson (2)	15:00	5,037		
28/03/14	Super League	7	Leeds Rhinos	H	Langtree Park	Won	14–10	Walker, Makinson (2)	Makinson	20:00	13,788	Sky Sports	
11/04/14	Super League	8	Castleford Tigers	A	The Jungle	Won	28–30	Soliola, Lomax, Makinson, Turner, Wellens, Swift	Walsh (3)	20:00	6,487	Sky Sports	
18/04/14	Super League	9	Wigan Warriors	H	Langtree Park	Lost	14–33	Makinson (2), Turner	Walsh	12:15	17,980	Sky Sports	
21/04/14	Super League	10	Widnes Vikings	A	Halton Stadium	Lost	40–26	Soliola, Masoe, Wellens, Makinson, Hohaia	Makinson (3)	15:00	7,706		
01/05/14	Super League	11	London Broncos	H	Langtree Park	Won	48–18	Dawson, Walsh, Lomax, Makinson, Hohaia, Swift, Greenwood, Jones, Flanagan	Walsh (6)	20:00	9,408	Sky Sports	
11/05/14	Super League	12	Bradford Bulls	A	Odsal Stadium	Won	0–50	Wilkin (2), Walsh, Lomax, Makinson, Swift, Soliola, McCarthy-Scarsbrook, Roby	Walsh (7)	15:00	6,311		
18/05/14	Super League	13: Magic Weekend	Warrington Wolves	N	Etihad Stadium	Lost	41–24	Walmsley, Turner, Hohaia, Dawson	Walsh (4)	17:00	28,213	Sky Sports	
23/05/14	Super League	14	Huddersfield Giants	H	Langtree Park	Won	41–22	Wheeler (2), Hohaia, Wellens, Dawson, Wilkin, Masoe	Walsh (6)	20:00	10,218	Sky Sports	
30/05/14	Super League	15	Salford Red Devils	H	Langtree Park	Won	32–12	Wellens (2), Soliola, Hohaia, Wheeler	Walsh (6)	20:00	11,000		
14/06/14	Super League	16	Catalans Dragons	A	Stade Gilbert Brutus	Lost	42–0			18:00	7,276	Sky Sports	
22/06/14	Super League	17	Castleford Tigers	H	Langtree Park	Won	38–16	Makinson, Wellens (2), Turner, Percival (2), Walsh	Walsh (5)	15:00	12,648		
27/06/14	Super League	18	Wigan Warriors	A	DW Stadium	Won	12–16	Makinson (2), Wellens	Percival (2)	20:00	20,224	Sky Sports	
06/07/14	Super League	19	Hull Kingston Rovers	A	KC Lightstream Stadium	Lost	40–10	Percival, Masoe	Percival	15:00	7,611		
11/07/14	Super League	20	Bradford Bulls	H	Langtree Park	Won	46–22	Roby, Wellens (2), Masoe, Percival, Swift, Hohaia, Makinson	Percival (7)	20:00	10,238		
19/07/14	Super League	21	London Broncos	A	The Hive Stadium	Won	16–58	Percival (2), Amor, Turner (2), Wellens, Dawson (2), Thompson, Soliola, Laffranchi	Percival (7)	15:00	1,791		
25/07/14	Super League	22	Widnes Vikings	H	Langtree Park	Won	44–22	Flanagan, Makinson (3), Masoe (2), Turner, Manu	Percival (6)	20:00	11,844		
01/08/14	Super League	23	Hull F.C.	A	KC Stadium	Lost	19–12	Makinson, Wellens	Percival (2)	20:00	10,214		
15/08/14	Super League	24	Wakefield Trinity Wildcats	H	Langtree Park	Won	40–16	Makinson (2), Jones (2), Mcdonnell (2), Soliola	Percival (6)	20:00	11,000		
29/08/14	Super League	25	Leeds Rhinos	A	Headingley Stadium	Won	12–13	LMS, Roby	Percival, Makinson	20:00	17,682	Sky Sports	
04/09/14	Super League	26	Warrington Wolves	H	Langtree Park	Lost	12–39	McDonnell, Manu	Makinson (2)	20:00	12,854	Sky Sports	
14/09/14	Super League	27	Huddersfield Giants	H	Galpharm Stadium	Lost	17–16	Makinson, Roby, Hohaia	Percival (2)	20:00	7,244	Sky Sports	

Super League XIX
Pos	Team	Pld	W	D	L	PF	PA	PD	Pts	Qualification
1	St Helens (L, C)	27	19	0	8	796	563	+233	38	Play-offs
2	Wigan Warriors	27	18	1	8	834	429	+405	37	Play-offs
3	Huddersfield Giants	27	17	3	7	785	626	+159	37	Play-offs
4	Castleford Tigers	27	17	2	8	814	583	+231	36	Play-offs
5	Warrington Wolves	27	17	1	9	793	515	+278	35	Play-offs
6	Leeds Rhinos	27	15	2	10	685	421	+264	32	Play-offs
7	Catalans Dragons	27	14	1	12	733	667	+66	29	Play-offs
8	Widnes Vikings	27	13	1	13	611	725	−114	27	Play-offs
9	Hull Kingston Rovers	27	10	3	14	627	665	−38	23	
10	Salford Red Devils	27	11	1	15	608	695	−87	23	
11	Hull F.C.	27	10	2	15	653	586	+67	22	
12	Wakefield Trinity Wildcats	27	10	1	16	557	750	−193	21	
13	Bradford Bulls (R)	27	8	0	19	512	984	−472	10 (Note: Bradford Bulls deducted 6 points on 25 February 2014 for entering administration)	Relegation to Championship
14	London Broncos (R)	27	1	0	26	438	1237	−799	2	Relegation to Championship

(C) Champions; (L) League Leaders' Shield Winners; (R) Relegated

== Super League XIX – Play-Off Series ==
Date	Competition	Rnd	Vs	H/A	Venue	R	Score	Tries	Goals	Att	TV	Report
19/09/14	Super League	Qualifying Play-Off	Castleford	H	Langtree Park	W	41–0	Roby (2), Turner, Swift, Makinson, Amor, Masoe	Percival (6), Turner (DG)	7,548	Sky	
02/10/14	Super League	Qualifying Semi-Final	Catalans Dragons	H	Langtree Park	W	30–12	Turner, Swift, Manu, Masoe, Percival	Percival (5)	8,888	Sky	
11/10/14	Super League	Grand Final	Wigan	N	Old Trafford	W	14–6	Soliola, Makinson	Percival (3)	70,102	Sky	

Even without key players Luke Walsh, Jon Wilkin & Jonny Lomax for the majority of the second half of the season, Saints managed to battle through the play-offs to reach an unprecedented 10th Grand Final. Even though they also lost Lance Hohaia in the second minute of the game via a disgraceful punch from Ben Flower, Saints overcame the solid defence of Wigans remaining 12 men to claim their 5th Super League title.

== 2014 Tetley's Challenge Cup Fixtures\Results ==
LEGEND
Win
Draw
Loss

Date	Competition	Rnd	Vs	H/A	Venue	R	Score	Tries	Goals	KO	Att	TV	Report
06/04/2014	Challenge Cup	Round 4	Huddersfield Giants	A	John Smith's Stadium	P Bentham	16–17	Swift, Makinson (2)	Walsh (2), Walsh (DG)	14:15	7,150	BBC Sport	
26/04/2014	Challenge Cup	Round 5	Leeds Rhinos	A	Headingley Stadium	R Silverwood	32–12	Swift, Jones	Walsh (2)	14:30	12,194	BBC Sport	
