= Oliver Davies =

Oliver Davies may refer to:

- Oliver Davies (harpist) (fl. c. 1822), Welsh harpist
- Oliver Davies (theologian) (born 1956), British theologian
- Olly Davies (born 1995), English rugby league player
- Oliver Ford Davies (born 1939), English actor and writer
- Oliver Davies (cricketer) (born 2000), Australian cricketer

== See also ==
- Oliver Davis (disambiguation)
