= Richard Beaumont =

Richard Beaumont may refer to:

- Sir Richard Beaumont, 1st Baronet (1574–1631), English politician and MP
- Richard Ashton Beaumont (1912–2009), British diplomat
- Richard Beaumont (actor) (1961–2022), British actor, in Scrooge and Whoever Slew Auntie Roo?
- Richard Beaumont (rugby league) (born 1988), English rugby league player

== See also ==
- Beaumont (disambiguation)
