= List of St Helens R.F.C. seasons =

St Helens R.F.C. is an English professional rugby league club based in St Helens, Merseyside. Formed in 1873, the club has competed in the sport since the foundation of the Northern Rugby Football Union in 1895. This list details the club's achievements in all major competitions

== Seasons ==
=== Super League era ===
Season	League						Play-offs	Challenge Cup	Other competitions	
Season	Division	Pld	W	D	L	Pos	Play-offs	Challenge Cup	Other competitions	
1996	Super League	22	20	0	2	1/12	N/A	W	Premiership	RU
1997	Super League	22	14	1	7	3/12	N/A	W	Premiership	RU
1997	Super League	22	14	1	7	3/12	N/A	W	World Club Challenge	QF
1998	Super League	23	14	1	8	4/12	Elim Final	QF		
1999	Super League	30	23	0	7	2/14	W	R5		
2000	Super League	28	23	0	5	2/12	W	R5	World Club Challenge	RU
2001	Super League	28	17	2	9	4/12	Elim Final	W	World Club Challenge	W
2002	Super League	28	23	0	5	1/12	W	RU		
2003	Super League	28	16	1	11	4/12	SF		World Club Challenge	RU
2004	Super League	28	17	1	10	5/12	Elim Final	W		
2005	Super League	28	23	1	4	1/12	Elim Final	SF		
2006	Super League	28	24	0	4	1/12	W	W		
2007	Super League	27	19	0	8	1/12	RU	W	World Club Challenge	W
2008	Super League	27	21	1	5	1/12	RU	W		
2009	Super League	28	19	0	9	2/14	RU	SF		
2010	Super League	27	20	0	7	2/14	RU	SF		
2011	Super League	27	17	3	7	3/14	RU	SF		
2012	Super League	27	17	2	8	3/14	SF	QF		
2013	Super League	27	15	1	11	5/14	Prelim SF	R4		
2014	Super League	27	19	0	8	1/14	W	R5		
2015	Super League	30	19	0	11	4/12	SF	SF	World Club Challenge	RU
2016	Super League	30	19	0	11	4/12	SF	R6		
2017	Super League	30	16	1	13	4/12	SF	R6		
2018	Super League	30	26	0	4	1/12	SF	SF		
2019	Super League	29	26	0	3	1/12	W	RU		
2020	Super League	17	12	0	5	2/12	W	QF	World Club Challenge	RU
2021	Super League	17	12	0	5	2/12	W	W	World Club Challenge	Not played
2022	Super League	27	21	0	6	1/12	W	SF	World Club Challenge	Not played
2023	Super League	27	20	0	7	3/12	SF	SF	World Club Challenge	W
2024	Super League	27	15	0	12	6/12	Elim Finals	QF		
2025	Super League	27	17	0	10	5/12	SF	QF		
2026	Super League	27	15	0	12	7/12	DNQ	SF		
