= Greg Richards (rugby league) =

English rugby league footballer

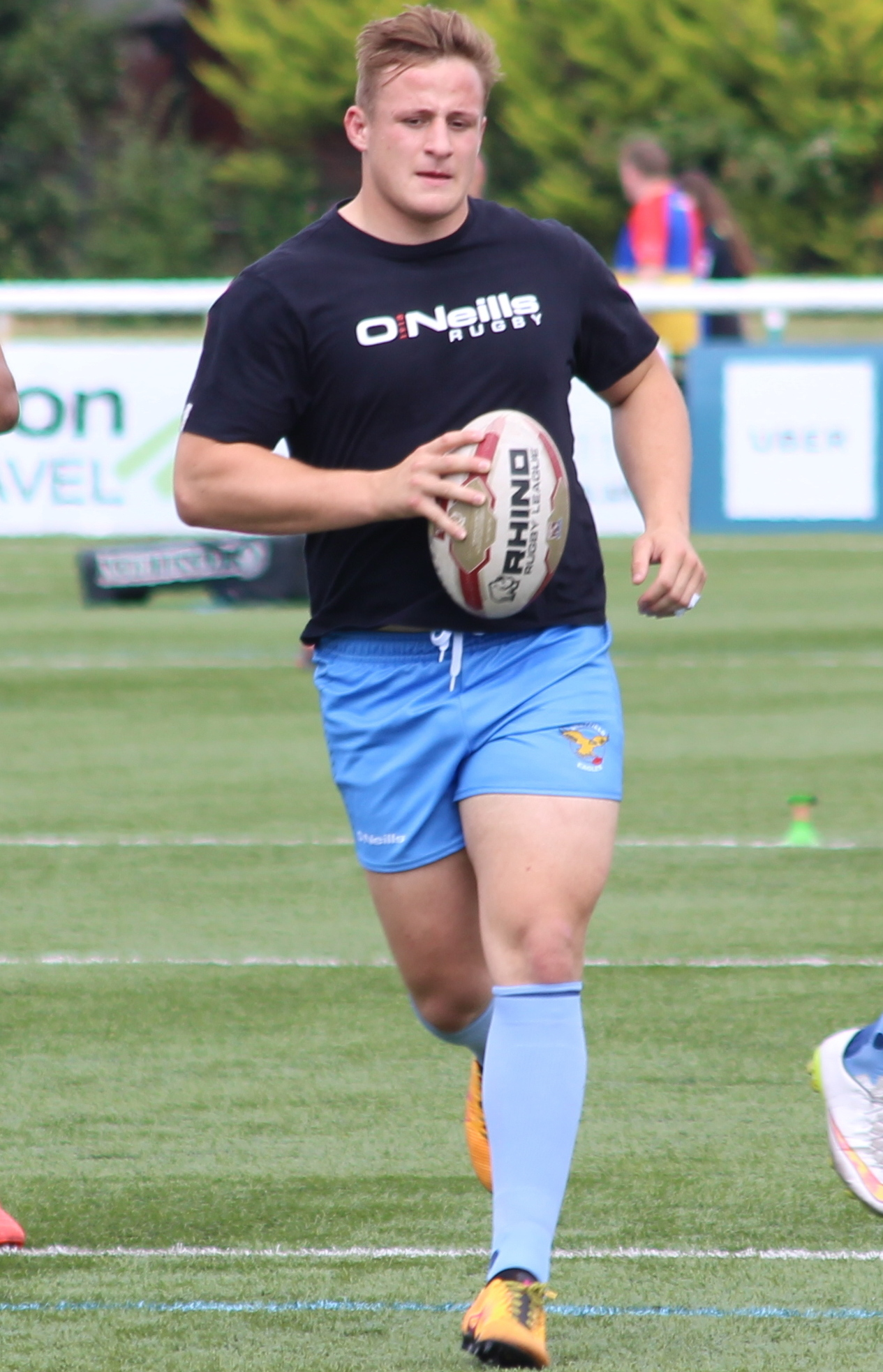

Personal information
- Full name: Gregory Richards
- Born: 12 July 1995 (age 31) Urswick, Cumbria, England
- Height: 5 ft 11 in (1.80 m)
- Weight: 16 st 12 lb (107 kg)

Playing information
- Position: Prop
Club
Years	Team	Pld	T	G	FG	P
2013–17	St Helens	70	1	0	0	4
2014(loan)	→ Rochdale Hornets	3	0	0	0	0
2017(DR)	→ Sheffield Eagles	3	0	0	0	0
2017–18	Leigh Centurions	35	3	0	0	12
2019–21	London Broncos	35	1	0	0	4
2022–23	Hull Kingston Rovers	15	0	0	0	0
2022(DR)	→ Dewsbury Rams	1	0	0	0	0
2023–25	Toulouse Olympique	40	7	0	0	28
2026–	Barrow Raiders	0	0	0	0	0
	Total	202	12	0	0	48
- Source: As of 25 September 2026

Greg Richards (born 12 July 1995) is an English rugby league footballer who plays as a prop for semi-professional side Barrow Raiders in the RFL Championship.

He played for St Helens in the Super League, and on loan from Saints at the Rochdale Hornets and the Sheffield Eagles in the Championship. Richards also played in the Super League and the Championship for the Leigh Centurions, the London Broncos, Hull KR and Toulouse Olympique.

== Background ==
Richards was born in Urswick, Cumbria, England. He attended Ulverston Victoria High School

He started his career with amateur club Barrow Island.

== Career ==
=== St Helens ===
He was signed by St Helens. He made his first team début in July 2013 in a Super League game against Castleford.

He appeared in the 2014 Super League Grand Final as a substitute in Saints' 14–6 victory over the Wigan Warriors at Old Trafford.

During the 2017 season, Richards was sent to Championship side the Sheffield Eagles as part of a Dual registration deal with Saints. Here, he played just three games before returning.

=== Leigh Centurions ===
Shortly after his departure from the Eagles came his departure from the Saints, as he joined then struggling Super League outfit Leigh.

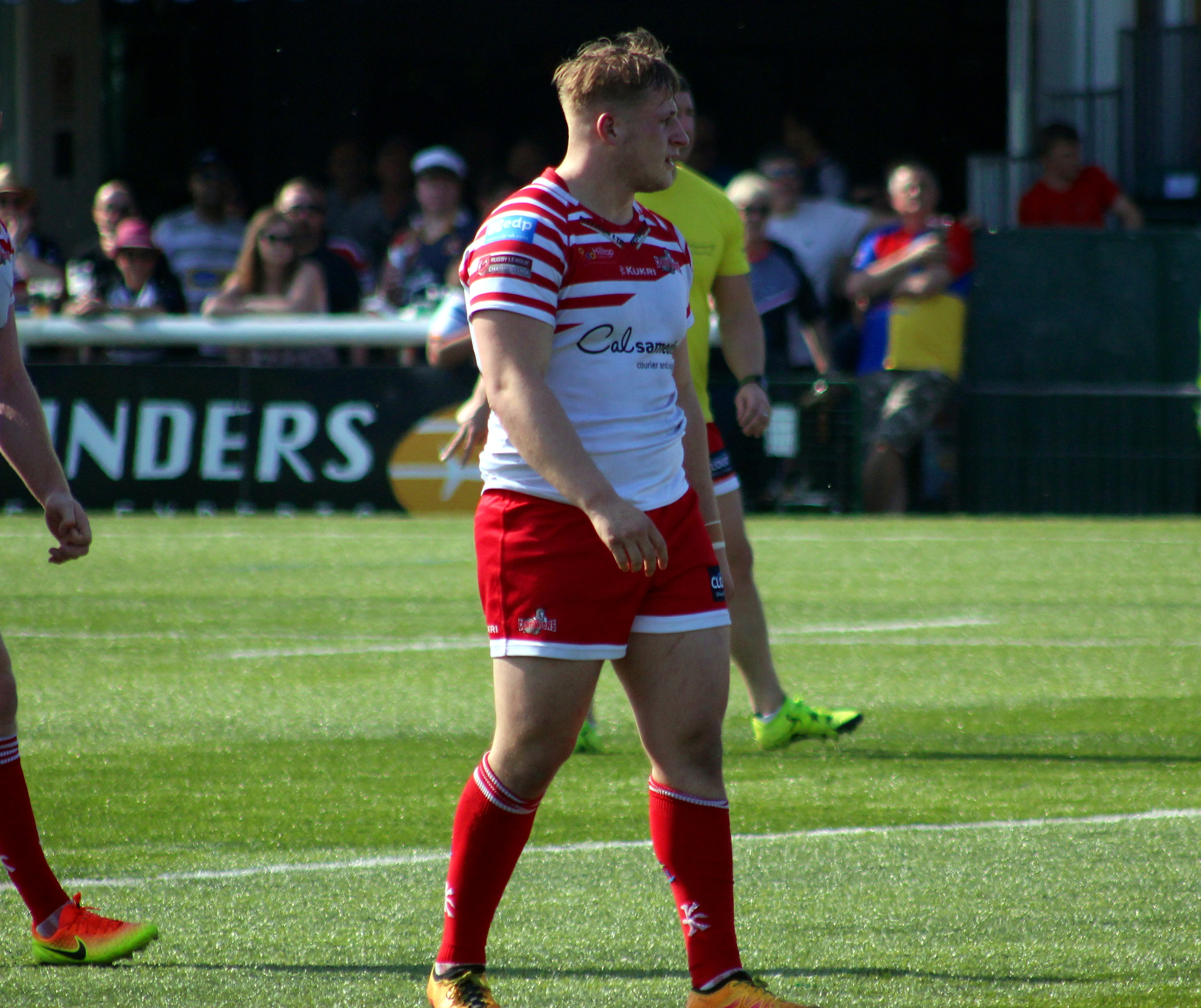
Richards playing for the Leigh Centurions in 2018

He played for the Leigh Centurions in the 2018 Betfred Championship.

=== London Broncos ===
On 31 October 2018 it was announced that Richards had joined the London Broncos ahead of the 2019 Super League season.

=== Hull Kingston Rovers ===
On 8 September 2021 it was reported that he had signed for Hull Kingston Rovers in the Super League

=== Toulouse Olympique ===
On 27 September 2023 it was reported that he would make his stay at Toulouse Olympique permanent in 2024 on a two-year deal On 15 October 2023, Richards played in Toulouse Olympique's upset loss in the Million Pound Game against the London Broncos.

On 20 October 2025 it was reported that he had left Toulouse Olympique

=== Barrow Raiders ===
On 16 November 2025, it was reported that he had dropped out of the professional game to join semi-professional side Barrow Raiders on a one-year deal for the 2026 season..

== Club statistics ==
Year	Club	Competition	Appearances	Tries	Goals	Drop goals	Points
2013	St Helens	Super League	3	0	0	0	0
2014	St Helens	Super League	12	0	0	0	0
2014	Rochdale Hornets	Championship	3	0	0	0	0
2015	St Helens	Super League	30	0	0	0	0
2016	St Helens	Super League	26	1	0	0	4
2017	St Helens	Super League	3	0	0	0	0
2017	Sheffield Eagles	Championship	3	0	0	0	0
2017	Leigh Centurions	Super League	9	0	0	0	0
2018	Leigh Centurions	Championship	26	3	0	0	12
2019	London Broncos	Super League	21	0	0	0	0
2020	London Broncos	Championship	2	0	0	0	0
2021	London Broncos	Championship	12	1	0	0	4
Club career total			146	5	0	0	20
