= Matthew Dawson =

Matthew, Mathew, Matt, Mat or Matty Dawson may refer to:

- Matt Dawson (born 1972), English rugby union player
- Matty Dawson (born 1990), English rugby league player
- Matt Dawson (field hockey) (born 1994), Australian field hockey player
- Matt Dawson (astronomer), British-born astronomer living in Luxembourg who discovered some minor planets including Mattdawson
- Mathew Dawson (1820–1898), British racehorse trainer
- Matthew Dawson (politician), member of the Rhode Island House of Representatives
