= Oliver Davis =

Oliver Davis may refer to:

- Oliver Davis (actor) (born 1993), American child actor
- Oliver Davis (composer) (born 1972), English composer
- Oliver Davis (American football) (born 1954), American football cornerback

== See also ==
- Oliver Leydon-Davis (born 1990), New Zealand badminton player
- Oliver Davies (disambiguation)
