= Matty Fozard =

Wales international rugby league player

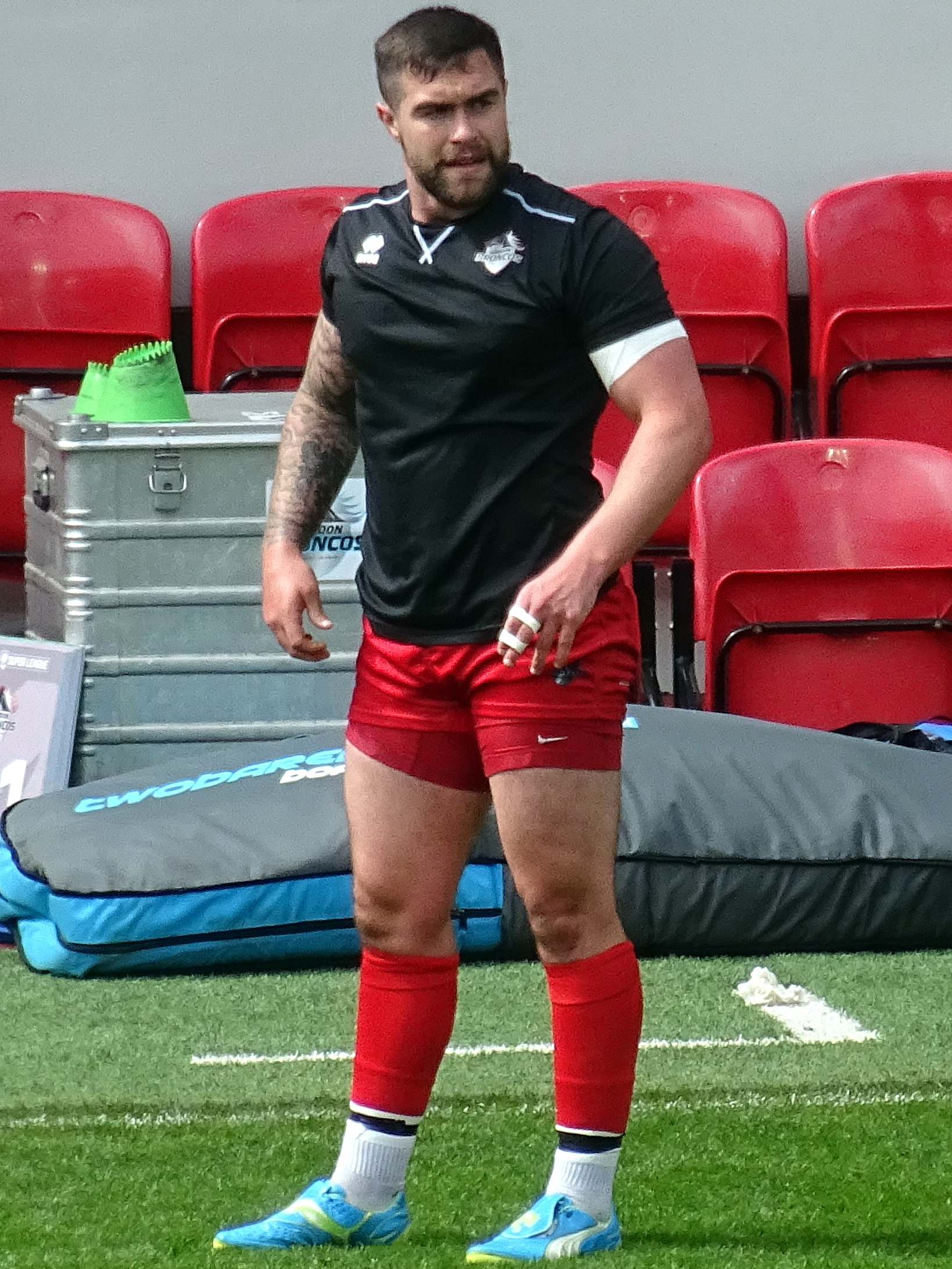

Personal information
- Full name: Matthew Ian Fozard
- Born: 3 March 1995 (age 31) Widnes, Lancashire, England
- Height: 5 ft 10 in (1.78 m)
- Weight: 14 st 2 lb (90 kg)

Playing information
- Position: Hooker, Scrum-half, Loose forward
Club
| Years | Team | Pld | T | G | FG | P |
|---|---|---|---|---|---|---|
| 2014–15 | St Helens | 1 | 0 | 0 | 0 | 0 |
| 2015(loan) | → Batley Bulldogs | 10 | 3 | 0 | 0 | 12 |
| 2015(loan) | → Rochdale Hornets | 5 | 2 | 0 | 0 | 8 |
| 2016–18 | Sheffield Eagles | 94 | 28 | 6 | 0 | 124 |
| 2019–20 | London Broncos | 29 | 5 | 1 | 0 | 22 |
| 2021 | London Broncos | 13 | 3 | 1 | 0 | 14 |
| 2022– | Widnes Vikings | 145 | 43 | 2 | 0 | 176 |
| | Total | 297 | 84 | 10 | 0 | 356 |
Representative
| Years | Team | Pld | T | G | FG | P |
| 2014–26 | Wales | 19 | 4 | 17 | 0 | 50 |
- Source: As of 26 October 2026

Matthew Ian Fozard (born 3 March 1995) is a Wales international rugby league footballer who plays as a hooker for the Widnes Vikings in the RFL Championship.

He previously played for St Helens in the Super League, and on loan from Saints at the Batley Bulldogs in the Championship and the Rochdale Hornets in Championship 1. Fozard also played for the Sheffield Eagles in the Championship and previously played for the Broncos in the Super League and the Championship.

== Background ==
Fozard was born in Widnes, Lancashire, England.

== Career ==
=== St Helens ===
He played for St Helens in the Super League, and on loan from Saints at the Batley Bulldogs in the Championship and the Rochdale Hornets in Championship 1.

He made his Super League début on 21 April 2014 for St Helens against the Widnes Vikings.

=== Sheffield Eagles ===
In October 2015 Fozard joined the Sheffield Eagles on a two-year deal. Fozard played for the Sheffield Eagles in the Championship for three seasons.

=== London Broncos ===
In October 2018 Fozard joined the London Broncos on a two-year deal.

=== Widnes Vikings ===
On 7 September 2021, it was reported that he had signed for Widnes in the RFL Championship.

== International ==
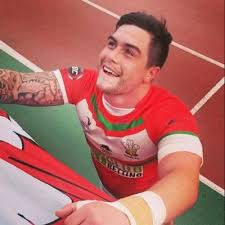
Fozard on international duty with Wales

On 7 October 2014, Fozard was selected by Welsh coach John Kear to play in Wales' 2014 European Cup campaign. Fozard made his international début against France in Albi.

In October 2016, Fozard played for Wales in the 2017 World Cup qualifiers match against Italy. He was then also selected as a squad member for the tournament finals. He played in all three of their group games against Papua New Guinea, Fiji and Ireland.

He took over as captain in the 24-0 win over Ireland on 26 October 2025, kicking 3 goals

== Club statistics ==
| Year | Club | Competition | Appearances | Tries | Goals | Drop goals | Points |
|---|---|---|---|---|---|---|---|
| 2014 | St Helens | Super League | 1 | 0 | 0 | 0 | 0 |
| 2015 | → Batley Bulldogs (loan) | Championship | 10 | 3 | 0 | 0 | 12 |
| 2015 | → Rochdale Hornets (loan) | League 1 | 5 | 2 | 0 | 0 | 8 |
| 2016 | Sheffield Eagles | Championship | 31 | 9 | 2 | 0 | 40 |
| 2017 | Sheffield Eagles | Championship | 33 | 11 | 0 | 0 | 44 |
| 2018 | Sheffield Eagles | Championship | 30 | 8 | 4 | 0 | 40 |
| 2019 | London Broncos | Super League | 23 | 3 | 0 | 0 | 12 |
| 2020 | London Broncos | Championship | 6 | 2 | 1 | 0 | 10 |
| 2021 | London Broncos | Championship | 7 | 2 | 1 | 0 | 10 |
| 2022 | Widnes Vikings | Championship | 27 | 11 | 0 | 0 | 44 |
| 2023 | Widnes Vikings | Championship | 29 | 3 | 0 | 0 | 12 |
| 2024 | Widnes Vikings | Championship | 30 | 11 | 0 | 0 | 44 |
| 2025 | Widnes Vikings | Championship | 29 | 8 | 0 | 0 | 32 |
| 2026 | Widnes Vikings | Championship | 30 | 10 | 2 | 0 | 44 |
| 2027 | Widnes Vikings | Championship | | | | | |
| Club career total | | | 291 | 83 | 10 | 0 | 352 |
