= 2013 St Helens R.F.C. season =

English rugby league club season

The 2013 St Helens season saw the club compete in Super League XVIII as well as the 2013 Challenge Cup tournament.

== Transfers ==
Transfers In
Date	Position	No.	Player	From	Length
11 June 2012	SR	13	Willie Manu	Hull F.C.	2 years
3 July 2012	CE	3	Jordan Turner	Hull F.C.	2 years
13 September 2012	PR	25	Alex Walmsley	Batley Bulldogs	3 years
28 March 2013	HK	36	Stuart Howarth	Salford City Reds	Loan
1 June 2013	SH	37	Gareth O'Brien	Warrington Wolves	Loan

== Pre-season friendlies ==
11 January 2013
20:00

St. Helens	26 - 0	Huddersfield Giants
	Report

Langtree Park, St. Helens
Attendance: 3492
Referee: James Child

20 January 2013
15:00

St. Helens	42 - 12	Wakefield Trinity Wildcats
	Report

Langtree Park, St. Helens
Attendance: 2158
Referee: Steve Ganson

== Super League ==
2 February 2013
16:45

St. Helens	4 - 40	Huddersfield Giants
	Report

Langtree Park, St. Helens
Attendance: 12003
Referee: Richard Silverwood

10 February 2013
15:00

Widnes Vikings	4 - 16	St. Helens
Tries: Stefan Marsh 9'	Report	Tries: Francis Meli 18', 72'; Lee Gaskell 68'; Goals: Lee Gaskell 68', 72'

Stobart Stadium, Widnes
Attendance: 8322
Referee: James Child

15 February 2013
20:00

St. Helens	22 - 22	Hull F.C.
	Report

Langtree Park, St. Helens
Attendance: 11257
Referee: Ben Thaler

23 February 2013
14:00

Bradford Bulls	10 - 36	St. Helens
	Report

Provident Stadium, Bradford
Attendance: 8203
Referee: Tim Roby

1 March 2013
20:00

St. Helens	12 - 20	Leeds Rhinos
Tries: Jonny Lomax 10'; Francis Meli 74', 78'	Report	Tries: Ryan Hall 29', 64'; Kylie Leuluai 60'; Goals: Kevin Sinfield 2', 26', 60', 64'

Langtree Park, St. Helens
Attendance: 12228
Referee: Phil Bentham

8 March 2013
20:00

Warrington Wolves	10 - 22	St. Helens
Tries: Chris Bridge 39', 75'; Goals: Brett Hodgson 75'	Report	Tries: Jordan Turner 5'; Lance Hohaia 10'; Francis Meli 20'; James Roby 71'; Goals: Jonny Lomax 10', 61', 71'

Halliwell Jones Stadium, Warrington
Attendance: 13381
Referee: Richard Silverwood

15 March 2013
20:00

St. Helens	52 - 18	Wakefield Trinity Wildcats
	Report

Langtree Park, St. Helens
Attendance: 11211
Referee: Robert Hicks

22 March 2013
20:00

St. Helens	14 - 10	Salford City Reds
	Report

Langtree Park, St. Helens
Attendance: 5348
Referee: Phil Bentham

29 March 2013
12:15

Wigan Warriors	28 - 16	St. Helens
	Report

DW Stadium, Wigan
Attendance: 23861
Referee: Richard Silverwood

1 April 2013
15:00

St. Helens	48 - 18	Castleford Tigers
	Report

Langtree Park, St. Helens
Attendance: 10943
Referee: Robert Hicks

7 April 2013
15:00

Hull Kingston Rovers	22 - 14	St. Helens
Tries: David Hodgson 9'; Josh Hodgson 20'; Cory Paterson 51'; Alex Brown 67'; Goals: Craig Hall 20', 51', 79'	Report	Tries: Mark Percival 31', 37'; Adam Swift 60'; Goals: Mark Percival 31'

Craven Park, Hull
Attendance: 7616
Referee: Ben Thaler

12 April 2013
20:00

St. Helens	12 - 22	Catalans Dragons
	Report

Langtree Park, St. Helens
Attendance: 11111
Referee: Phil Bentham

27 April 2013
13:00

London Broncos	21 - 14	St. Helens
	Report

Twickenham Stoop, London
Attendance: 2839
Referee: Tim Roby

3 May 2013
20:00

St. Helens	28 - 35	Widnes Vikings
	Report

Langtree Park, St. Helens
Attendance: 11438
Referee: Robert Hicks

20 May 2013
19:45

Leeds Rhinos	22 - 30	St. Helens
	Report

Headingley, Leeds
Attendance: 15998
Referee: Ben Thaler

25 May 2013
28:45

St. Helens	22 - 48	Warrington Wolves
	Report

Etihad Stadium, Manchester
Attendance: 30973
Referee: Phil Bentham

3 June 2013
19:45

Huddersfield Giants	25 - 16	St. Helens
	Report

John Smith's Stadium, Huddersfield
Attendance: 5203
Referee: Richard Silverwood

9 June 2013
15:00

St. Helens	30 - 18	Bradford Bulls
	Report

Langtree Park, St. Helens
Attendance: 11385
Referee: Thierry Alibert

21 June 2013
20:00

Salford City Reds	10 - 52	St. Helens
	Report

Salford City Stadium, Salford
Attendance: 3711
Referee: George Stokes

28 June 2013
20:00

St. Helens	12 - 24	Hull Kingston Rovers
	Report

Langtree Park, St. Helens
Attendance: 10820
Referee: Robert Hicks

7 July 2013
15:30

Castleford Tigers	24 - 40	St. Helens
	Report

The Jungle, Castleford
Attendance: 8229
Referee: George Stokes

22 July 2013
19:45

St. Helens	22 - 16	Wigan Warriors
Tries: Adam Swift 9', 15'; Joe Greenwood 77'; Goals: Gareth O'Brien 9', 15'; Tom Makinson 56'; Jordan Turner 70', 77'	Report	Tries: Pat Richards 23'; Josh Charnley 38', 46'; Goals: Pat Richards 46'; Drop Goals: Pat Richards 57'; Matty Smith 75'

Langtree Park, St. Helens
Attendance: 14204
Referee: James Child

3 August 2013
17:00

Catalans Dragons	6 - 26	St. Helens
Tries: Morgan Escare 28'; Goals: Thomas Bosc 28'	Report	Tries: Francis Meli 14'; Tom Makinson 24', 45'; Paul Wellens 62', 73'; Goals: Gareth O'Brien 14'; Jordan Turner 62', 73'

Stade Gilbert Brutus, Perpignan
Referee: Ben Thaler

=== Matchday Squads ===
Date	Opposition	V	Score	FB	WG	CE	CE	WG	SO	SH	PR	HK	PR	SR	SR	LF	INT1	INT2	INT3	INT4
2/2/13	Huddersfield	H	4-40	Wellens	Makinson	Turner	Jones	Meli	Gaskell	Lomax	Perry	Roby	Laffranchi	Soliola	Wilkin	Manu	Hohaia	Flanagan	Puletua	Scarsbrook
10/2/13	Widnes	A	16-4	Wellens	Makinson	Turner	Jones	Meli	Gaskell	Lomax	Perry	Hohaia	Laffranchi	Soliola	Wilkin	Manu	Greenwood	Flanagan	Puletua	Scarsbrook
15/2/13	Hull F.C.	H	22-22	Wellens	Makinson	Turner	Jones	Meli	Gaskell	Lomax	Puletua	Roby	Laffranchi	Soliola	Wilkin	Manu	Greenwood	Flanagan	Walmsley	Scarsbrook
23/2/13	Bradford	A	36-10	Lomax	Gardner	Turner	Jones	Meli	Wheeler	Wilkin	Puletua	Roby	Laffranchi	Soliola	Manu	Flanagan	Greenwood	Walker	Walmsley	Scarsbrook
1/3/13	Leeds	H	12-20	Lomax	Gardner	Turner	Percival	Meli	Wheeler	Wilkin	Walker	Roby	Laffranchi	Soliola	Manu	Puletua	Greenwood	Jones	Clough	Scarsbrook
8/3/13	Warrington	A	22-10	Lomax	Gardner	Turner	Jones	Meli	Hohaia	Wilkin	Scarsbrook	Roby	Laffranchi	Soliola	Manu	Flanagan	Greenwood	Walker	Clough	Puletua
15/3/13	Wakefield Trinity	H	52-18	Lomax	Makinson	Turner	Jones	Meli	Hohaia	Wilkin	Walmsley	Roby	Laffranchi	Soliola	Manu	Walker	Hand	Flanagan	Clough	Scarsbrook
22/3/13	Salford	H	14-10	Wellens	Gardner	Turner	Jones	Meli	Charnock	Wilkin	Perry	Ashe	Puletua	Flanagan	Manu	Scarsbrook	Speakman	Soliola	Clough	Walmsley
29/3/13	Wigan	A	16-28	Makinson	Gardner	Turner	Percival	Meli	Wellens	Wilkin	Scarsbrook	Howarth	Laffranchi	Jones	Manu	Walker	Soliola	Flanagan	Clough	Walmsley
1/4/13	Castleford	H	48-18	Makinson	Swift	Turner	Jones	Percival	Wellens	Wilkin	Perry	Howarth	Clough	Soliola	Flanagan	Scarsbrook	Greenwood	Laffranchi	Walmsley	Tilley
7/4/13	Hull K.R.	A	14-22	Makinson	Swift	Turner	Percival	Meli	Wellens	Wilkin	Scarsbrook	Howarth	Clough	Soliola	Flanagan	Jones	Hohaia	Laffranchi	Walmsley	Greenwood
13/4/13	Catalans Dragons	H	12-22	Makinson	Swift	Turner	Percival	Meli	Hohaia	Wilkin	Scarsbrook	Howarth	Laffranchi	Soliola	Jones	Wellens	Clough	Greenwood	Walmsley	Tilley
27/4/13	London	A	14-21	Makinson	Swift	Turner	Jones	Percival	Ashe	Hohaia	Scarsbrook	Howarth	Puletua	Soliola	Laffranchi	Wellens	Clough	Walmsley	Thompson	Charnock
3/5/13	Widnes	H	28-35	Makinson	Gardner	Turner	Greenwood	Percival	Jones	Ashe	Perry	Howarth	Puletua	Thompson	Laffranchi	Wellens	Hohaia	Manu	Walmsley	Scarsbrook
20/5/13	Leeds	A	30-22	Wellens	Gardner	Turner	Percival	Makinson	Ashe	Wilkin	Perry	Howarth	Thompson	Soliola	Manu	Scarsbrook	Jones	Laffranchi	Puletua	Walmsley
25/5/13	Warrington	N	22-48	Hohaia	Gardner	Turner	Percival	Makinson	Ashe	Wilkin	Scarsbrook	Howarth	Puletua	Soliola	Manu	Jones	Thompson	Laffranchi	Clough	Walmsley
3/6/13	Huddersfield	A	16-25	Wellens	Gardner	Jones	Percival	Meli	Turner	O'Brien	Scarsbrook	Hohaia	Puletua	Soliola	Manu	Wilkin	Roby	Thompson	Clough	Walmsley
9/6/13	Bradford	H	30-18	Wellens	Makinson	Turner	Jones	Meli	Lomax	O'Brien	Scarsbrook	Roby	Puletua	Soliola	Manu	Wilkin	Howarth	Hand	Clough	Walmsley
21/6/13	Salford	A	52-10	Lomax	Makinson	Turner	Jones	Meli	Wellens	O'Brien	Scarsbrook	Roby	Laffranchi	Puletua	Manu	Wilkin	Hohaia	Thompson	Walmsley	Greenwood
28/6/13	Hull K.R.	H	12-24	Lomax	Makinson	Turner	Jones	Meli	Wellens	O'Brien	Puletua	Roby	Laffranchi	Howarth	Manu	Wilkin	Hohaia	Greenwood	Walmsley	Scarsbrook
7/7/13	Castleford	A	40-24	Lomax	Makinson	Turner	Jones	Meli	Wilkin	O'Brien	Puletua	Roby	Clough	Thompson	Manu	Scarsbrook	Wellens	Greenwood	Walmsley	Richards
22/7/13	Wigan	H	22-16	Lomax	Makinson	Turner	Meli	Swift	Wilkin	O'Brien	Puletua	Howarth	Laffranchi	Jones	Manu	Scarsbrook	Wellens	Greenwood	Clough	Walmsley
3/8/13	Catalans Dragons	A	26-6	Lomax	Makinson	Turner	Meli	Swift	Wilkin	O'Brien	Puletua	Howarth	Laffranchi	Jones	Manu	Scarsbrook	Wellens	Walker	Walmsley	Richards
9/8/13	London	H	0-0	Lomax	Makinson	Turner	Meli	Swift	Wilkin	Hohaia	Puletua	Howarth	Laffranchi	Jones	Manu	Scarsbrook	Wellens	Walker	Walmsley	Richards

== Challenge Cup ==
20 April 2013
14:30

Hull Kingston Rovers	26 - 18	St. Helens
	Report

Craven Park, Hull
Attendance: 4454
Referee: Richard Silverwood
