= Oliver Davies (harpist) =

Oliver Davies was a 19th-century Welsh harpist. He was born in Montgomery. Whilst still a young musician he performed at the Royal Cambrian Institution (May 1822) and as principal harpist at the Welshpool Eisteddfod (1824) and the Cymmrodorion Eisteddfod in London (May 1829).
