= Jake Spedding =

English rugby league footballer

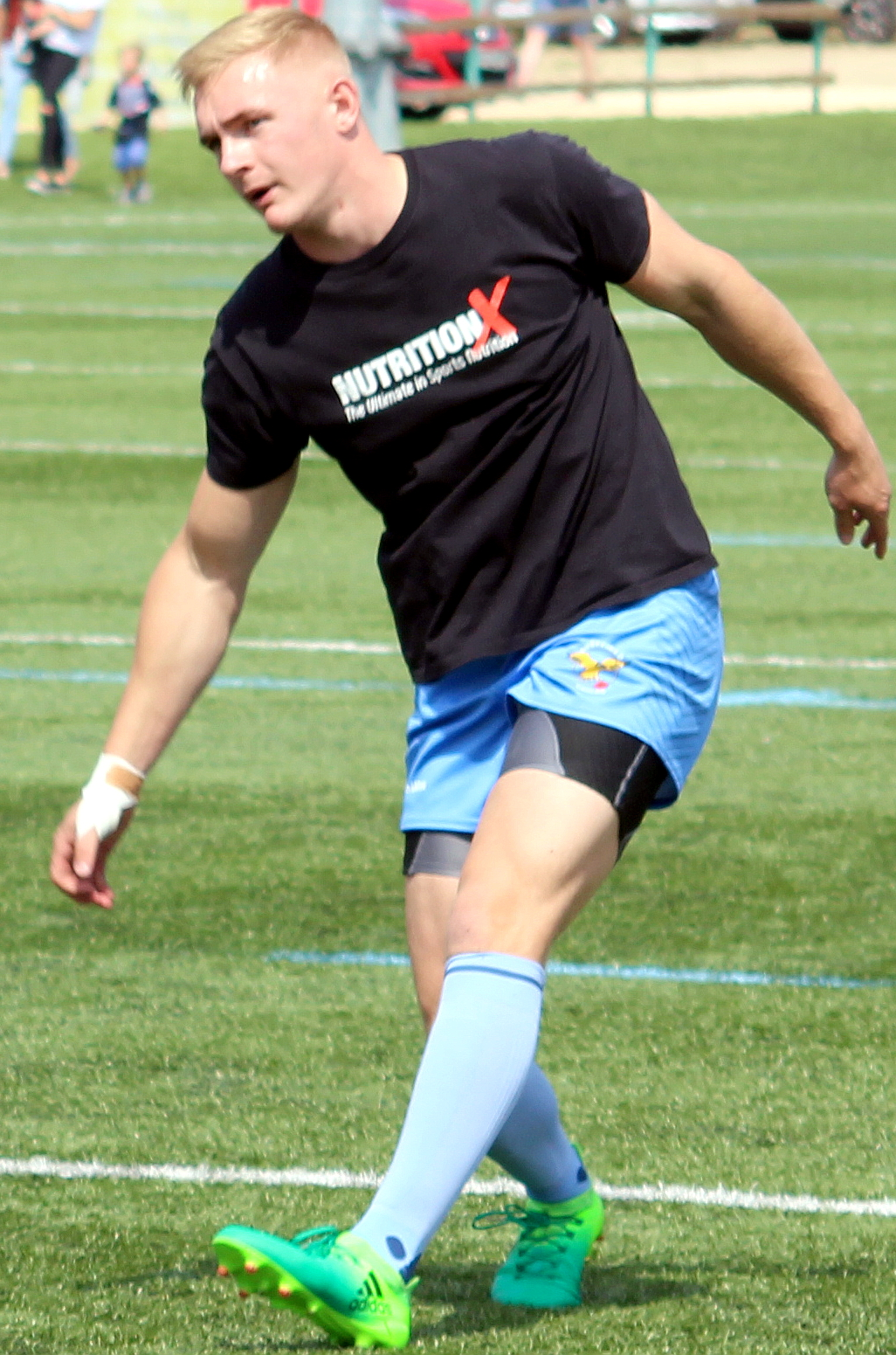

Personal information
- Full name: Jacob Spedding
- Born: 26 September 1996 (age 30) Leeds, West Yorkshire, England
- Height: 6 ft 1 in (1.85 m)
- Weight: 13 st 12 lb (88 kg)

Playing information
- Position: Centre, Wing
Club
Years	Team	Pld	T	G	FG	P
2016–18	St Helens	4	0	0	0	0
2017(loan)	→ Sheffield Eagles	10	2	0	0	8
2018(loan)	→ Sheffield Eagles	17	7	0	0	28
2019	Barrow Raiders	13	5	3	0	26
2019	Featherstone Rovers	20	5	0	0	24
2020–22	Widnes Vikings	25	10	0	0	40
2023–24	Swinton Lions	46	12	0	0	48
2025–26	North Wales Crusaders	16	8	0	0	32
2026–	Salford	4	2	0	0	8
	Total	155	51	3	0	214
- Source: As of 31 October 2026

Jake Spedding (born 26 September 1996) is an English professional rugby league footballer who plays centre or winger for Salford in the Championship.

He previously played for St Helens in the Super League, and on loan from the Saints at the Sheffield Eagles in the Championship. Spedding has also played at Barrow Raiders, Featherstone Rovers, North Wales Crusaders and Widnes Vikings in the Championship.

== Background ==
Spedding was born in Leeds, West Yorkshire, England.

== Career ==
=== St Helens ===
Spedding made his début in the Super League for St. Helens on 8 April 2016 against the Warrington Wolves.

=== Sheffield Eagles (loan) ===
His first professional try came for the Sheffield Eagles in a Championship game against the Rochdale Hornets in which they won 18–42. He spent the 2017 season on loan with the side. Following this loan spell, Spedding rejoined the Eagles as part of a Dual registration deal between St Helens and Sheffield for the 2018 season. He was very impressive during his time at Sheffield and made a handful of Super League appearances at St Helens. However his loan to Barrow was less successful.

=== Featherstone Rovers ===
In 2019 he joined Featherstone but due to impressive performances from other centres he didn't get a game.

=== Widnes Vikings ===
At the end of the season he joined the Widnes Vikings.

=== North Wales Crusaders ===
On 24 December 2024 it was reported that he had signed for North Wales Crusaders in the RFL League 1.

=== Salford RLFC ===
On 18 June 2026 it was reported that he had signed for Salford in the Championship.
