= Atelea Vea =

Tonga international rugby league footballer

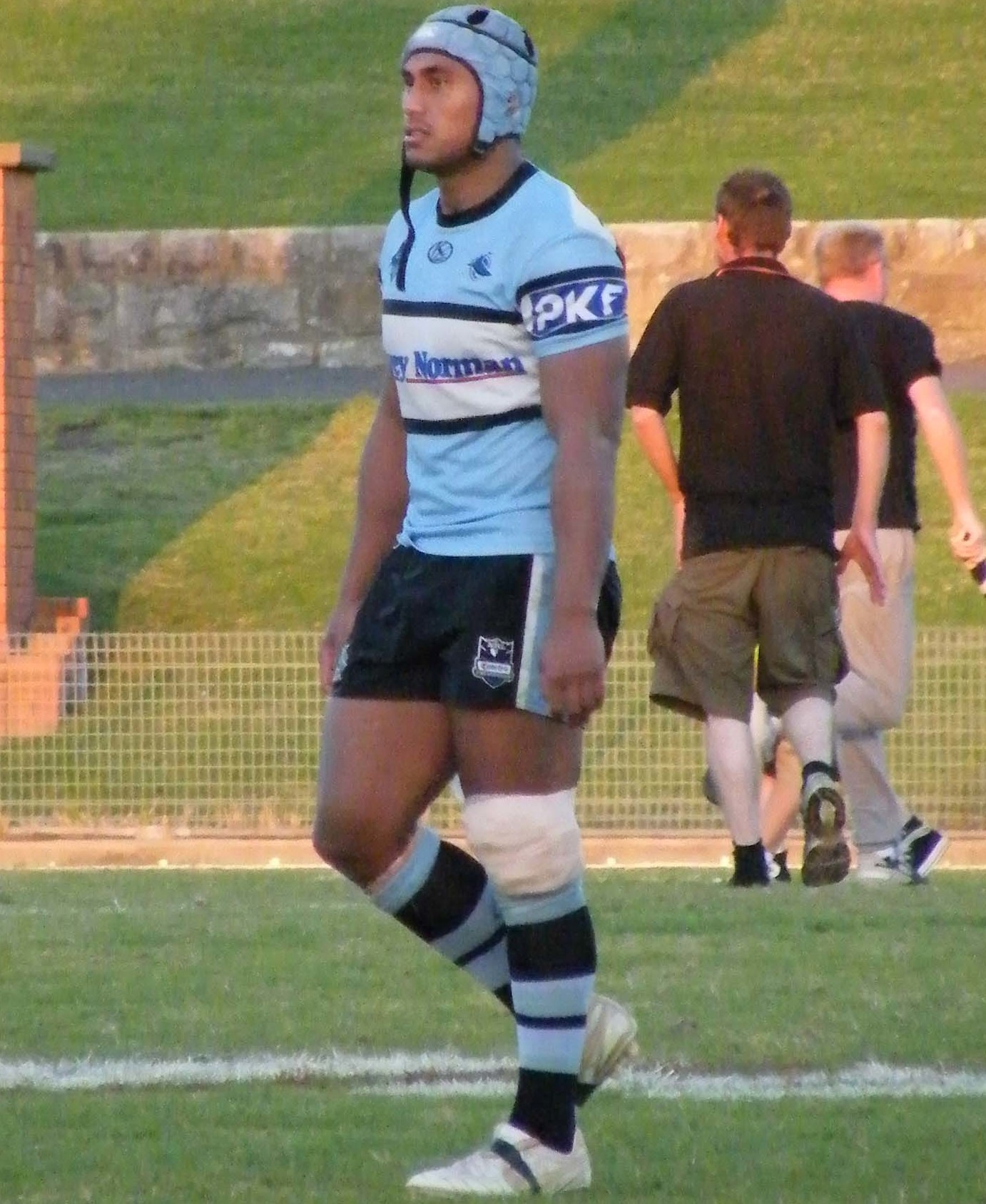

Personal information
- Born: 27 November 1986 (age 39) Sydney, New South Wales, Australia
- Height: 183 cm (6 ft 0 in)
- Weight: 103 kg (16 st 3 lb)

Playing information
- Position: Second-row, Lock, Prop
Club
Years	Team	Pld	T	G	FG	P
2009–10	Cronulla Sharks	8	0	0	0	0
2011	Melbourne Storm	11	0	0	0	0
2012–13	St. George Illawarra	3	0	0	0	0
2014	London Broncos	23	2	0	0	8
2015–16	St Helens	40	10	0	0	40
2017	Leigh Centurions	27	7	0	0	28
	Total	112	19	0	0	76
Representative
Years	Team	Pld	T	G	FG	P
2009	Tonga	2	1	0	0	4
- Source: As of 4 March 2018

Atelea Vea is a Tonga international rugby league footballer who last played for the Leigh Centurions in the Super League. He plays as a prop, lock or second-row forward. He has previously played for the Melbourne Storm, Cronulla-Sutherland Sharks, St. George Illawarra and the London Broncos.

He made his first-grade début for the Sharks in 2009. He was selected to play for Tonga in the 2009 Pacific Cup.

== Background ==
Vea was born in Sydney, Australia.

== Playing career ==
=== 2009: Cronulla-Sutherland Sharks ===
Vea made his first-grade début for the Cronulla-Sutherland Sharks away to the Penrith Panthers, in a round 10 loss, a game in which he came on off the interchange bench. He then featured in the 26–4 loss at home to the St. George Illawarra Dragons in the next round, where he was again on the bench. His first start for the Cronulla side came when the side hit something of a run of form. He started out in the second-row in a narrow 13–10 win over the Parramatta Eels, and he kept his starting place in wins over New Zealand Warriors (18–10), Canberra Raiders (24–22) and the thumping 46–16 thrashing of Brisbane Broncos, all of which were consecutive appearances. He was, in round 16 at the Sydney Roosters, shuffled to lock, where the Sharks lost their first game in four. He then had to wait another 10 rounds before being selected again, in the 26–24 loss to the South Sydney Rabbitohs.

=== 2010–11: Melbourne Storm ===
Signed by the Melbourne Storm in July 2009 ahead of the 2010 NRL season, Vea would have to bide his time in NSW Cup. He would return to NRL action in 2011, playing nine games for Melbourne, with all appearances of the bench. His performance in a losing effort in round 26 against the Sydney Roosters was praised by coach Craig Bellamy given the injury toll on the night.

=== 2012–13: St George-Illawarra ===
He played for the St. George Illawarra Dragons in 2012 and 2013.

=== 2014: London ===
He joined the London Broncos on 24 February 2014.

=== 2015-2016: St Helens ===
In 2015, Vea joined St Helens where he made 40 appearances over two seasons.

=== 2017: Leigh ===
In 2017, Vea joined Leigh where he played 27 matches in the 2017 Super League season. Leigh would be relegated from the Super League after losing the Million Pound Game and Vea was released from his contract.

== Representative career ==
He made his international début for Tonga in a 44–14 defeat by Papua New Guinea, where Vea scored a try. As Tonga did not progress to the final, Vea's next game was in the third/fourth place play-off loss to Fiji.
