= Dave Hewitt (rugby league) =

English rugby league footballer

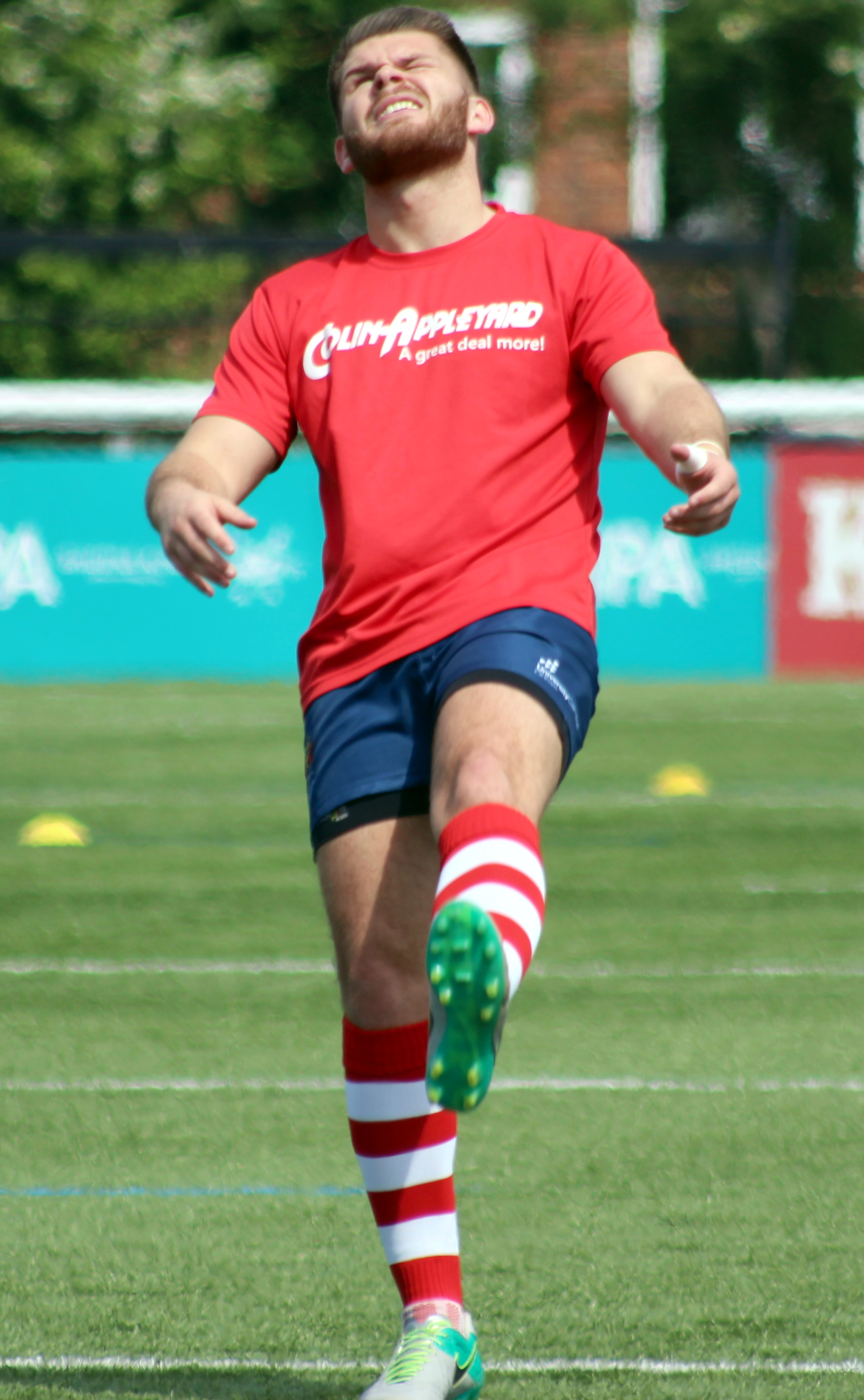

Personal information
- Full name: David Hewitt
- Born: 4 November 1995 (age 30) St Helens, Merseyside, England
- Height: 5 ft 7 in (1.70 m)
- Weight: 11 st 11 lb (75 kg)

Playing information
- Position: Scrum-half, Stand-off
Club
Years	Team	Pld	T	G	FG	P
2015–16	St Helens	0	0	0	0	0
2015(loan)	→ Oldham	6	5	0	0	20
2016	Sheffield Eagles	13	1	3	0	10
2016(loan)	→ Oldham	9	4	5	0	26
2017–22	Oldham	115	34	91	2	320
2023	Rochdale Hornets	18	2	58	1	125
2024	Midlands Hurricanes	7	0	24	0	48
	Total	168	46	181	3	549

Coaching information
Club
Years	Team	Gms	W	D	L	W%
2026–	Salford RLFC	18	7	0	11	39
- Source: As of 3 November 2026

Dave Hewitt (born 4 November 1995) is an English professional rugby league coach who is the head coach of Salford in the RFL Championship. He is also a former professional rugby league footballer who last played as a scrum-half, stand-off for Midlands Hurricanes. He moved from Rochdale Hornets in the RFL League 1.

== Background ==
Hewitt was born in St Helens, Merseyside, England.

== Playing career ==
Hewitt is an England Schoolboys and England Academy international.

He was in the Saints Academy system and played his junior rugby league with the Bold Miners club. He has previously played on loan from St. Helens at Oldham in 2015.

In 2016 Hewitt joined the Sheffield Eagles on a full-time deal. In July 2016 he joined Oldham on loan from the Eagles.

In October 2016 he joined the Roughyeds on a permanent deal.

== Coaching ==
=== Salford RLFC ===
On 24 March 2026 it was reported that he had temporarily taken the role of head-coach for Salford RLFC in the RFL Championship following the sudden and unexpected departure of Mike Grady
