= James Tilley (rugby league) =

English rugby league footballer

Personal information
- Full name: James Tilley
- Born: 11 November 1993 (age 31); Wigan, Greater Manchester, England
- Height: 6 ft 0 in (1.83 m)
- Weight: 14 st 0 lb (89 kg)

Playing information
- Position: Hooker, Loose forward, Second-row
Club
Years	Team	Pld	T	G	FG	P
2013–14	St Helens	3	0	0	0	0
2014(loan)	→ Rochdale Hornets	15	0	0	0	0
2015–16	Rochdale Hornets	46	9	0	0	0
2017–19	Whitehaven	47	4	0	0	16
2019–	North Wales Crusaders	7	0	0	0	0
	Total	118	13	0	0	16
- Source: As of 22 December 2020

James Tilley (born 11 November 1993) is an English professional rugby league footballer who plays for North Wales Crusaders in League 1.

In 2013, Tilley made his début for the club against Super League club Castleford Tigers.

== Early years ==
Tilley started his career playing for amateur club Ince Rose Bridge in his hometown of Wigan. He studied The Sutton Academy in St Helens.

== Playing career ==
He was signed by St. Helens at the age of 10. Prior to signing for the first team, he won Under 16s, 18s and 19s Player Of The Year awards in consecutive years. A versatile back rower, he has also been known to play prop. His preferred position is on the bench. He has now signed for North West Men’s League Division 4 team Rochdale Cobras.
