= Mose Masoe =

Former Samoa international rugby league footballer

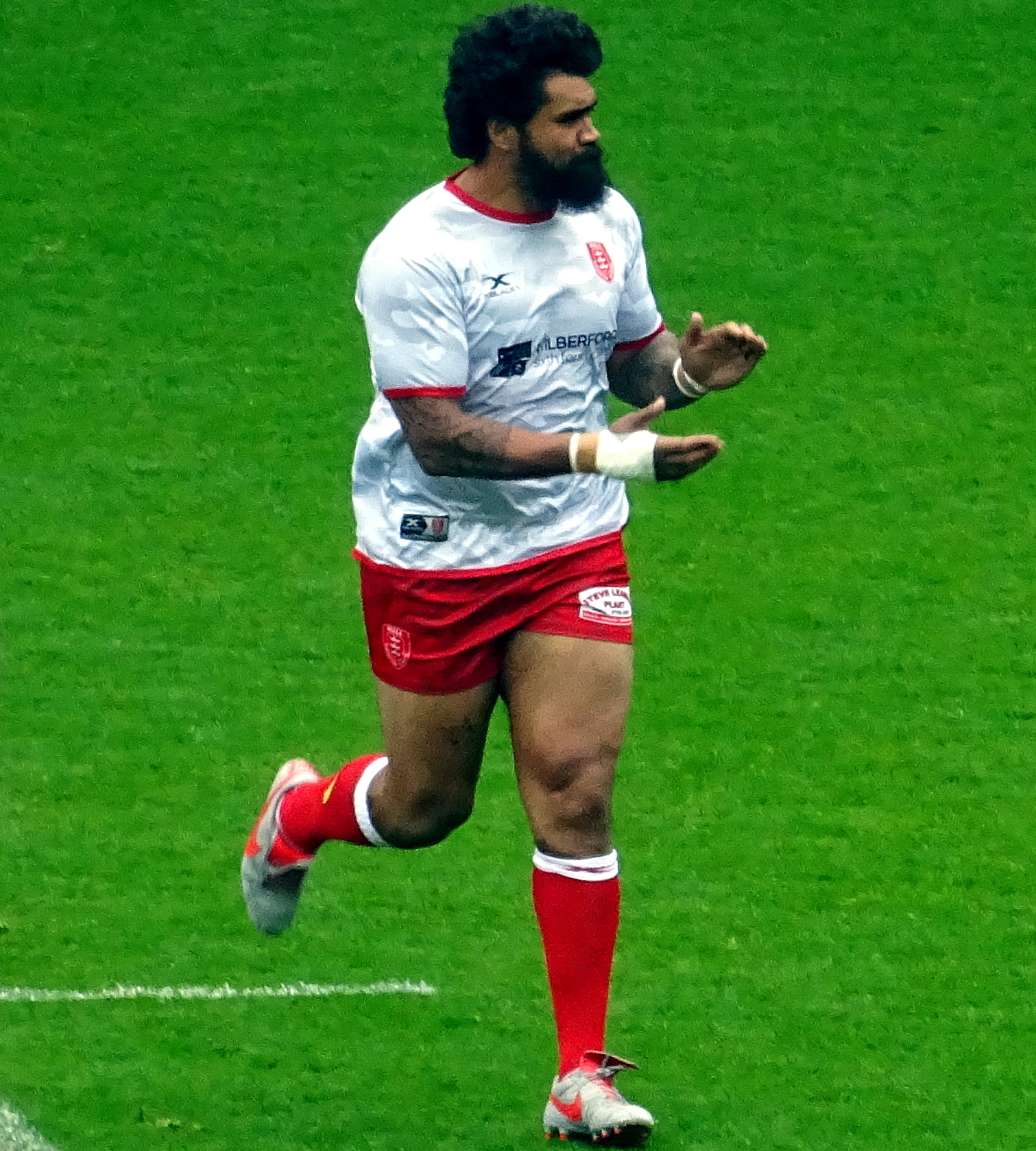

Personal information
- Full name: Mose Masoe
- Born: 17 May 1989 (age 37) Wellington, New Zealand

Playing information
- Height: 199 cm (6 ft 6 in)
- Weight: 130 kg (20 st 7 lb)
- Position: Prop
Club
Years	Team	Pld	T	G	FG	P
2010–12	Sydney Roosters	46	2	0	0	8
2013	Penrith Panthers	17	2	0	0	8
2014–15	St Helens	61	10	0	0	40
2017–19	Hull Kingston Rovers	59	6	0	0	24
	Total	183	20	0	0	80
Representative
Years	Team	Pld	T	G	FG	P
2013–14	Samoa	7	0	0	0	0

Mose Masoe (born 17 May 1989) is a former Samoa international rugby league footballer who last played as a prop for Hull Kingston Rovers in the Super League.

He previously played for the Sydney Roosters, Penrith Panthers in the NRL and was contracted to the St. George Illawarra Dragons, but did not feature in the first team due to serious injury. He played for St Helens in the Super League with whom he won the 2014 Super League Grand Final.

== Background ==
Masoe was born in Wellington, New Zealand. Masoe played his junior football for the Randwick Kingfishers in the Wellington Rugby League competition and the Wellington Orcas in the Bartercard Cup.

== Playing career ==
=== Sydney Roosters (2008–12) ===
Masoe was signed by the Sydney Roosters. He played for the Roosters' National Youth Competition team in 2008 and 2009, scoring 2 tries in 17 games.

Before moving onto the Roosters' New South Wales Cup reserve-grade team, the Newtown Jets.

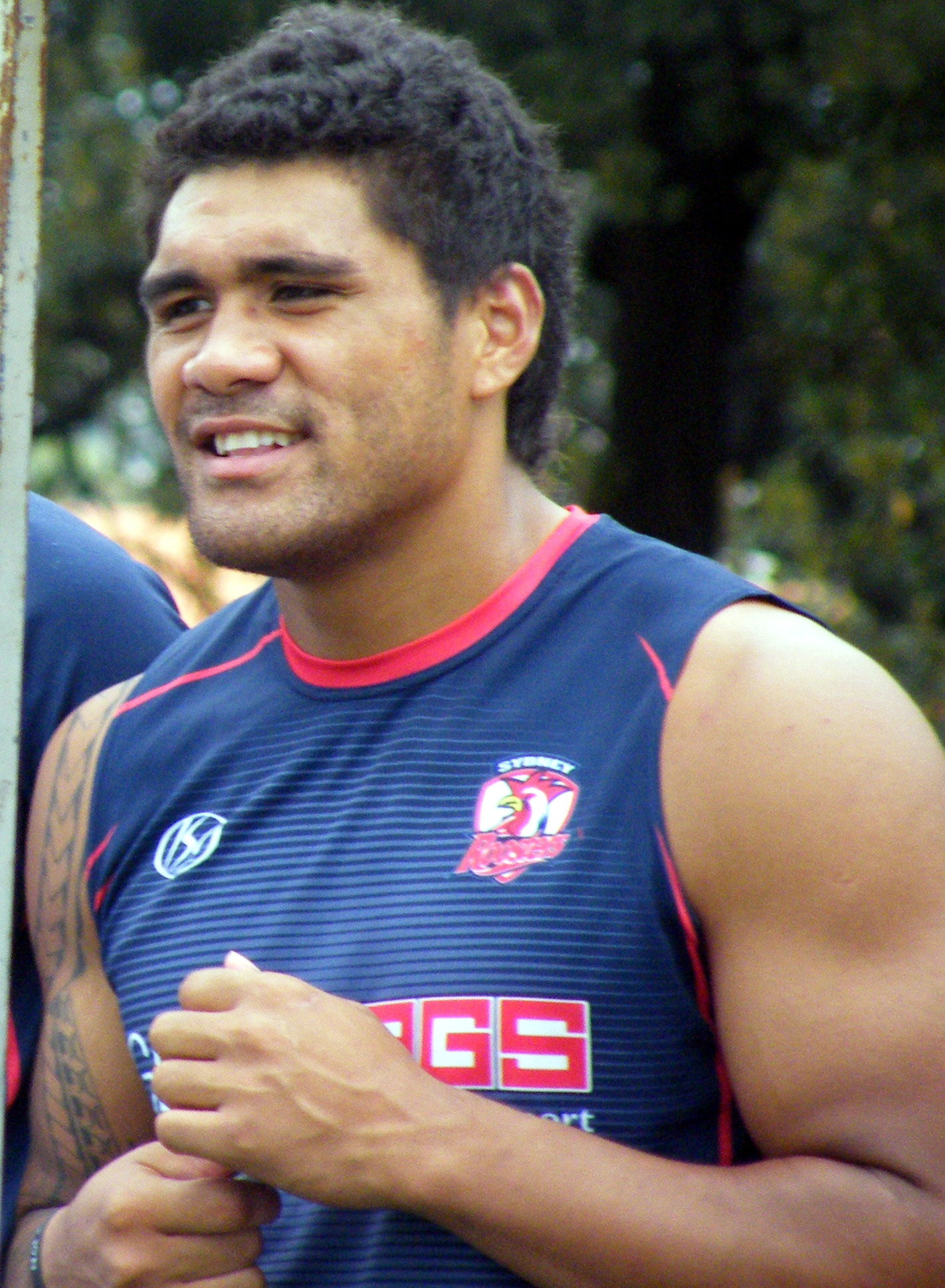
Masoe with the Sydney Roosters in 2010

In round 12 of the 2010 NRL season, he made his NRL début for the Sydney Roosters against the Gold Coast Titans. Masoe played 12 games for the Sydney Roosters in his debut season as the club reached the 2010 NRL Grand Final. Masoe did not feature in either the club's finals campaign or the decider itself.

Masoe was part of the Newtown Jets team that won the 2012 New South Wales Cup competition.

=== Penrith Panthers (2013) ===
On 7 December 2012, Masoe signed a two-year contract with the Penrith Panthers starting in 2013. He played 17 games for Penrith in the 2013 NRL season as the club missed out on the finals.

=== St Helens (2014–15) ===
On 26 June 2013, Masoe signed a 2-year contract with Super League team St. Helens, commencing from the 2014 season, after being released from the final year of his Penrith Panthers' contract.

He joined the club alongside his Penrith Panthers' team-mate Luke Walsh, who had also signed a two-year contract with the St. Helens.

St. Helens reached the 2014 Super League Grand Final. Masoe was selected to play as one of the starting props in their 14–6 victory over the Wigan Warriors at Old Trafford.

=== St. George Illawarra Dragons (2016) ===
On 29 June 2015, Masoe signed a two-year contract with the St. George Illawarra Dragons ahead of the start of the 2016 NRL season.

However, an anterior cruciate ligament (ACL) knee injury kept Masoe out for the entire 2016 rugby league season.

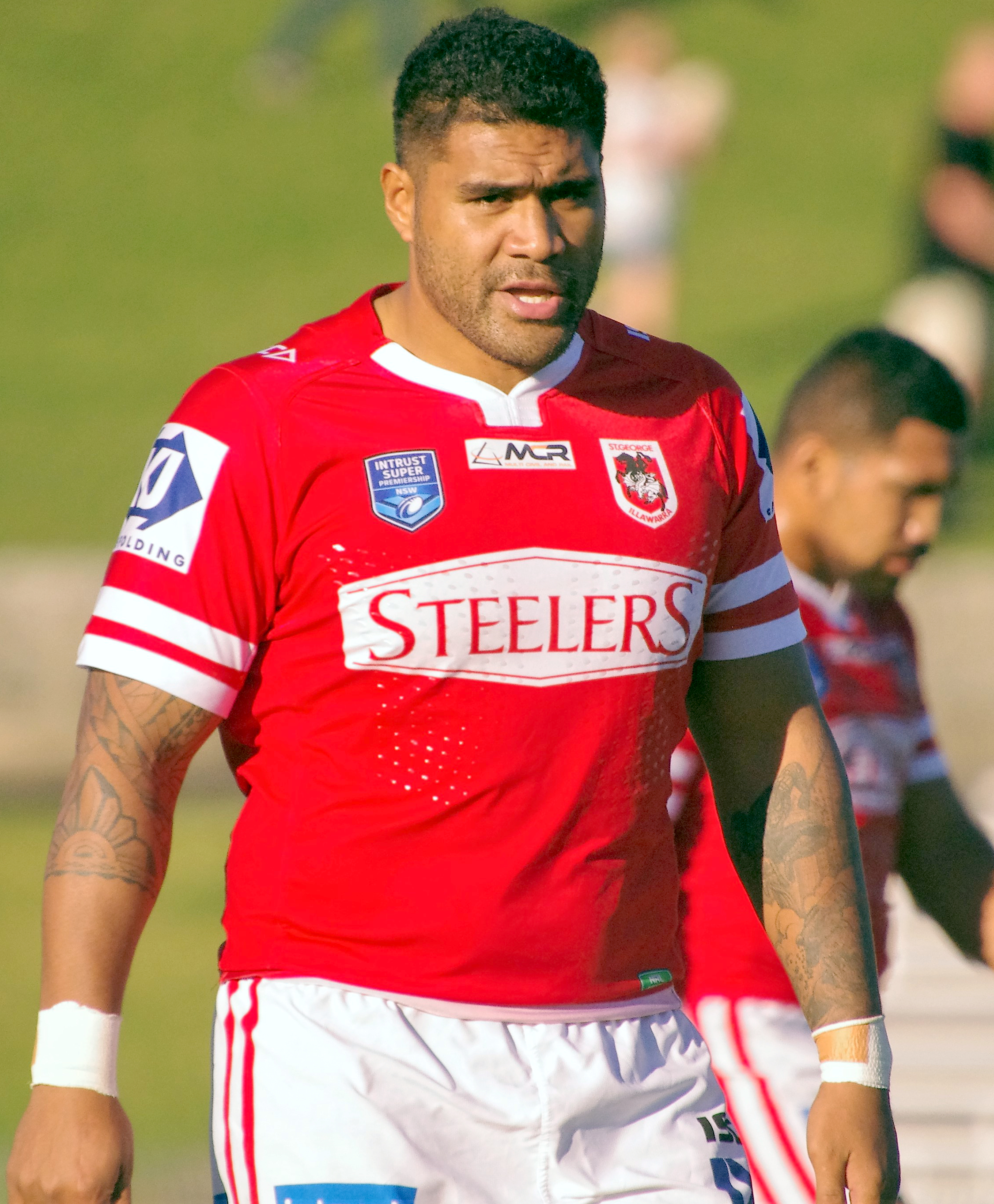
Masoe playing for St. George Illawarra in 2017

Subsequently in 2017, he was released without having played in a single game for St. George Illawarra.

=== Hull Kingston Rovers (2017–2020) ===
Masoe penned a deal to join Hull Kingston Rovers for the remainder of the 2017 Championship season, with the option to extend his contract for the 2018 season based on the club gaining promotion back to the Super League.

Masoe made his Hull Kingston Rovers' début on 6 August 2017, in a 26–22 Qualifiers victory over Halifax at Craven Park.

Masoe was part of the Hull Kingston Rovers' side that gained automatic promotion back to the Super League in the 2017 season. It was revealed on 26 June 2018, that Mose had signed a new three-year contract extension to stay at Hull Kingston Rovers until at least the end of the 2021 rugby league season.

In January 2020, Masoe was taken from the field on a stretcher during the club's pre-season friendly against Wakefield Trinity after suffering a serious spinal injury. Masoe was later rushed to hospital where he had emergency surgery. On 16 January 2020, it was announced that Masoe would not play rugby league again and was forced into early retirement. Hull KR head coach Tony Smith spoke to the media saying “This is a career-ending injury. If Mose is able to walk again that will be a success. I don’t want to paint a picture that everything is going to be fine and he’s going to be back doing things he used to do. It’s going to be a long old haul for Mose". During Masoe’s injury rehabilitation, he was able to first take unaided steps in September 2020.

== Representative career (2010–14) ==
Masoe has previously played for the Junior Kiwis. During the 2010 season, Masoe was selected in the Samoan and New Zealand train-on squads. During the 2013 season, Masoe was selected in the Samoan and New Zealand train-on squads once again, subsequently opting to play for Samoa.

Due to Masoe's exceptional performances in the 2013 season, he was selected in the Samoan squad and made his début at the 2013 Rugby League World Cup.

On 7 October 2014, Masoe was selected in Samoa's 24-man squad for the Four Nations series.

=== Club (St. Helens 2014–15) ===
- Super League (1): 2014
