= Richard Beaumont (rugby league) =

English rugby league footballer

Richie Beaumont
Personal information
- Full name: Richard Beaumont
- Born: 2 February 1988 (age 38) Kingston upon Hull, Humberside, England
- Height: 191 cm (6 ft 3 in)
- Weight: 100 kg (15 st 10 lb)

Playing information
- Position: Prop
Club
| Years | Team | Pld | T | G | FG | P |
|---|---|---|---|---|---|---|
| 2011–13 | Hull Kingston Rovers | 19 | 1 | 0 | 0 | 4 |
| 2013(loan) | → Gateshead Thunder | 2 | 0 | 0 | 0 | 0 |
| 2014 | St. Helens | 0 | 0 | 0 | 0 | 0 |
| 2014(loan) | → Rochdale Hornets | 4 | 0 | 0 | 0 | 0 |
| 2015 | Leigh Centurions | 0 | 0 | 0 | 0 | 0 |
| 2015(loan) | → Rochdale Hornets | 3 | 0 | 0 | 0 | 0 |
| 2015(loan) | → Whitehaven | 9 | 1 | 0 | 0 | 4 |
| 2015–16 | Whitehaven | 12 | 0 | 0 | 0 | 0 |
| | Total | 49 | 2 | 0 | 0 | 8 |
- Source: As of 23 March 2018

Richard Beaumont (born 1988) is an English former professional rugby league footballer who played prop in the 2010s.

Rich made his first team début for Hull Kingston Rovers on 25 April 2011 at home to Harlequins. He also played for St Helens in the Super League.
