= Olly Davies =

English rugby league footballer

Personal information
- Full name: Oliver Davies
- Born: 30 November 1995 (age 30) St Helens, Merseyside, England
- Height: 6 ft 0 in (1.82 m)
- Weight: 15 st 10 lb (100 kg)

Playing information
- Position: Second-row
Club
Years	Team	Pld	T	G	FG	P
2015–16	St Helens	2	0	0	0	0
2017–18	Swinton Lions	22	2	0	0	8
2018–21	Sheffield Eagles	89	20	0	0	80
2022–23	Widnes Vikings	56	11	0	0	44
2024	Halifax Panthers	9	0	0	0	0
2024(loan)	→ North Wales Crusaders	12	2	0	0	8
2025–	North Wales Crusaders	18	3	0	0	12
	Total	208	38	0	0	152
- Source: As of 6 September 2026

Oliver Davies (born 30 November 1995) is an English professional rugby league footballer who plays as a second-row forward for the North Wales Crusaders in the RFL League 1.

== Career ==
=== St Helens ===
Davies began his career with St Helens where he made his professional début as a substitute in a 26–16 away loss at Catalans Dragons.

=== Swinton Lions ===
He moved to Kingstone Press Championship side Swinton Lions in 2016 ahead of the 2017 season. The Second Rower spent a full season with them in which he appeared in 22 games and scored on two occasions, against Oldham and Halifax.

=== Sheffield Eagles ===
After his time with Swinton, Davies signed a two-year deal with fellow Championship side Sheffield Eagles. He helped the Eagles to win the inaugural 1895 Cup as they defeated Widnes Vikings 36–18 in the final.

=== Widnes Vikings ===
On 26 October 2021 it was reported that he had signed for Widnes Vikings in the RFL Championship.

=== Halifax Panthers ===
On 5 November 2023 it was reported that he had signed for Halifax in the RFL Championship.

=== North Wales Crusaders (loan) ===
On 12 July 2024 it was reported that he had signed for North Wales Crusaders in the RFL League 1 on loan

=== North Wales Crusaders ===
On 13 January 2025 it was reported that he had signed permanently for North Wales Crusaders in the RFL League 1.
