= Jordan Hand =

English rugby league footballer

Personal information
- Full name: Jordan Hand
- Born: 13 May 1993 (age 32) St. Helens, England

Playing information
- Height: 6 ft 0 in (183 cm)
- Weight: 15 st 10 lb (100 kg)
- Position: Prop
Club
Years	Team	Pld	T	G	FG	P
2013–15	St Helens	3	0	0	0	0
2013(loan)	→ Rochdale Hornets	5	1	0	0	4
2013(loan)	→ Whitehaven	9	0	0	0	0
2014(loan)	→ Whitehaven	20	2	0	0	8
2015(loan)	→ Whitehaven	1	0	0	0	0
2015(loan)	→ Wakefield Trinity Wildcats	2	0	0	0	0
2015(loan)	→ Rochdale Hornets	2	0	0	0	0
2016–17	Swinton Lions	28	0	0	0	0
2017	Rochdale Hornets	4	0	0	0	0
2017	Whitehaven	1	0	0	0	0
	Total	75	3	0	0	12

Jordan Hand is an English former professional rugby league footballer who last played for Whitehaven in Kingstone Press League One.

Hand played for St Helens in the Super League. He was signed as a youngster from a local side, Bold Miners. From the 2016 season, he played for Swinton Lions at blind-side prop (No. 10). In April 2017, he was transferred to Rochdale Hornets.
