= Matty Dawson-Jones =

English rugby league footballer

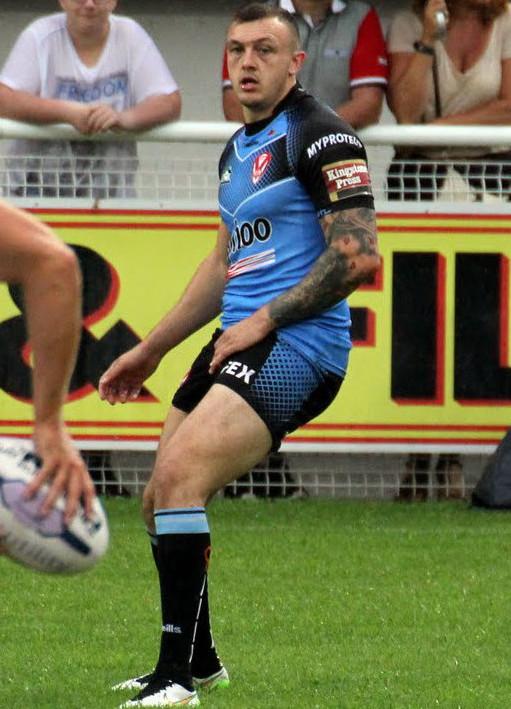

Personal information
- Full name: Matthew Dawson-Jones
- Born: 2 October 1990 (age 35) Pontefract, West Yorkshire, England
- Height: 5 ft 11 in (180 cm)
- Weight: 14 st 11 lb (94 kg)

Playing information
- Position: Wing, Centre
Club
Years	Team	Pld	T	G	FG	P
2012–13	Huddersfield Giants	5	0	0	0	0
2013(loan)	→ Doncaster RLFC	10	3	0	0	12
2014–16	St Helens	50	16	0	0	64
2014(DR)	→ Rochdale Hornets	5	4	0	0	16
2016–18	Leigh Centurions	66	41	0	0	164
2019	Hull FC	1	1	0	0	4
2020–22	Bradford Bulls	32	10	0	0	40
2023–25	Sheffield Eagles	78	46	0	0	184
2026	Hunslet RLFC	2	0	0	0	0
	Total	249	121	0	0	484
- Source: As of 29 January 2026

Matty Dawson-Jones is an English former rugby league footballer who last played as a winger or centre for Hunslet RLFC in the Championship.

He has previously played for the Huddersfield Giants in the Super League, spending time on loan from Huddersfield at Doncaster in the Championship. He played for St Helens, and spent time on loan from the Saints at the Rochdale Hornets in the Championship. He also played for the Leigh Centurions and Hull F.C. in the Super League and Championship.

== Background ==
Matthew Dawson was born in Pontefract, West Yorkshire, England.

== Career ==
=== Huddersfield Giants ===
Dawson, a Castleford Tigers player at youth level, made his senior début in the Super League with the Huddersfield Giants. Whilst at Huddersfield, Dawson also played for Doncaster on loan in the Championship, before signing for St. Helens, and making 50 appearances.

He has played for the Leigh Centurions in the Championship, and has played a few times for the Rochdale Hornets on dual registration.

=== Hull FC ===
In 2018, Dawson-Jones signed a contract with Hull FC which will see him play with the club from 2019.

In January 2020, Dawson-Jones signed a one-year deal with RFL Championship side Bradford Bulls. Following the cancelled season he took up the option of an extra year to stay for the 2021 season.

=== Hunslet RLFC ===
On 17 November 2025 it was reported that he had signed for Hunslet RLFC in the RFL Championship

He announced his retirement on 28 January 2026, after just 2 games for Hunslet RLFC.
