= Jordan Turner =

England international rugby league footballer (born 1989)

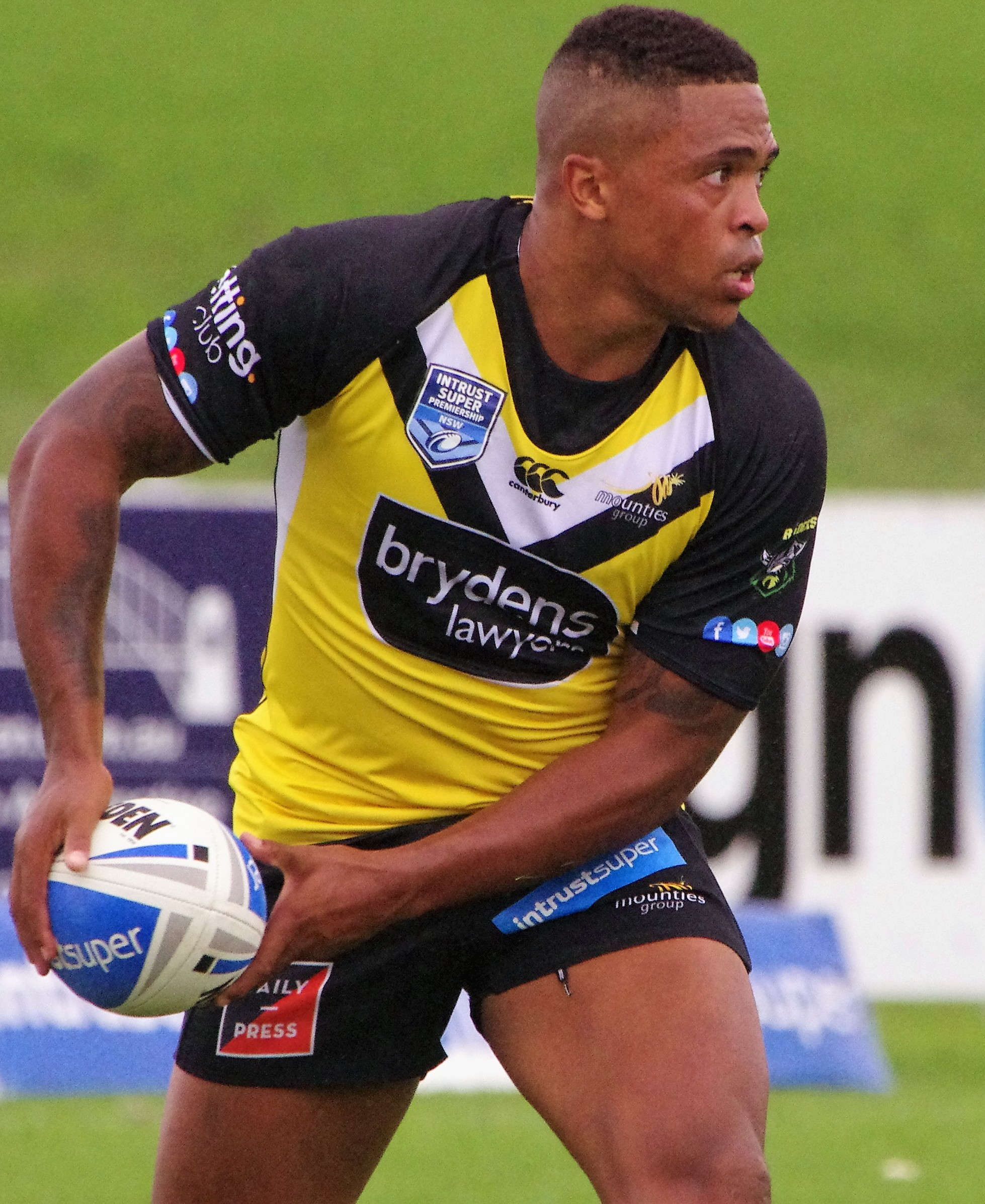

Personal information
- Full name: Jordan Jamal Turner
- Born: 9 January 1989 (age 37) Oldham, Greater Manchester, England
- Height: 6 ft 2 in (1.88 m)
- Weight: 17 st 0 lb (108 kg)

Playing information
- Position: Centre, Stand-off, Loose forward, Wing
Club
Years	Team	Pld	T	G	FG	P
2006–09	Salford City Reds	69	24	15	0	126
2010–12	Hull F.C.	72	34	0	0	136
2013–16	St Helens	117	45	13	3	209
2017	Canberra Raiders	0	0	0	0	0
2017–20	Huddersfield Giants	72	10	0	1	41
2021–23	Castleford Tigers	50	22	0	1	81
2024–25	Oldham	30	20	0	0	80
	Total	410	155	28	5	673
Representative
Years	Team	Pld	T	G	FG	P
2012	England Knights	2	2	9	0	26
2017	World All Stars	1	0	0	0	0
2021–25	Jamaica	1	0	0	0	0
- Source: As of 28 September 2023

Jordan Jamal Turner (born 9 January 1989) is a former professional rugby league footballer who most recently played as a centre, stand-off, loose forward or winger for Oldham RLFC in RFL Championship and the Jamaica national team.

He has also represented the England Knights at international level. He previously played for the Salford City Reds, Hull F.C., St Helens and the Huddersfield Giants in the Super League. He spent time with the Canberra Raiders in the National Rugby League, earning a place in the World All Stars team in 2017.

== Background ==
Turner was born in Oldham, Greater Manchester, England. He attended the Radclyffe School.

== Playing career ==
=== Salford City Reds ===
Turner first joined Salford City Reds at the age of 14 from his amateur club Waterhead A.R.L.F.C. (in Waterhead, Greater Manchester, Oldham). He captained the England Under-18s team and was voted Academy Player and Young Player of the Year in 2007, before establishing himself in the Salford City Reds' first team for 2 seasons.

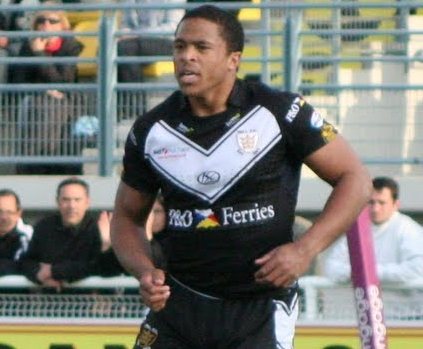
Turner playing for Hull F.C. in 2010

=== Hull FC ===
Turner joined Hull F.C. from Salford City Reds at the start of the 2010 season. The sought after signing is hoping for some successful years to come with Hull F.C. and has enjoyed runs at centre and stand-off since throwing on the black and white jersey. Twice in 2012 Turner played for the England Knights team. In July 2012, Turner signed a 2-year contract with St. Helens starting from 2013 season.

=== St. Helens ===
Turner was voted St Helens Player of the Season for 2013.

After 9 consecutive wins in the 2014 season (1 in the Challenge Cup) the Saints lost 2 consecutive games against Wigan Warriors and Widnes Vikings. Jordan was determined to make the club bounce back from two moral killer defeats. As of 24 April 2014, Jordan has scored three tries this season (all in the Super League) against Wigan, Catalans Dragons and Castleford Tigers.

St Helens reached the 2014 Super League Grand Final, and Turner was selected to play at loose forward in their 14–6 victory over the Wigan Warriors at Old Trafford.

=== Canberra Raiders ===
On 14 July 2016 he signed with NRL club the Canberra Raiders for two seasons.

=== Huddersfield Giants ===
On 26 May 2017, it was announced that Turner had signed for Super League side the Huddersfield Giants on a three-and-a-half-year contract. He made his début on Sunday 4 June against Warrington Wolves, scoring a try in the side's 44–4 home win.

=== Castleford Tigers ===
In November 2020, it was announced that Turner had signed for the Castleford Tigers on a one-year deal.

In May 2021, Turner signed a new two-year deal with Castleford. In the 2021 Challenge Cup semi-final, Turner scored a hat-trick as Castleford defeated Warrington 35–20. On 17 July 2021, he played for Castleford in their 2021 Challenge Cup Final loss against St Helens.

On 15 October 2021, Turner made his début for the Jamaica national team against the England Knights at Wheldon Road for his testimonial match. Turner played 20 games for Castleford in the Super League XXVIII season and as the club finished 11th on the table narrowly avoiding relegation.

=== Oldham RLFC ===
On 23 August 2023, it was announced that Turner had signed for his hometown club Oldham RLFC on a two-year deal in a player-coach role.

On 28 August 2025, it was announced that Jordan had retired from playing rugby league with immediate effect.
