= Joe Greenwood =

England international rugby league footballer

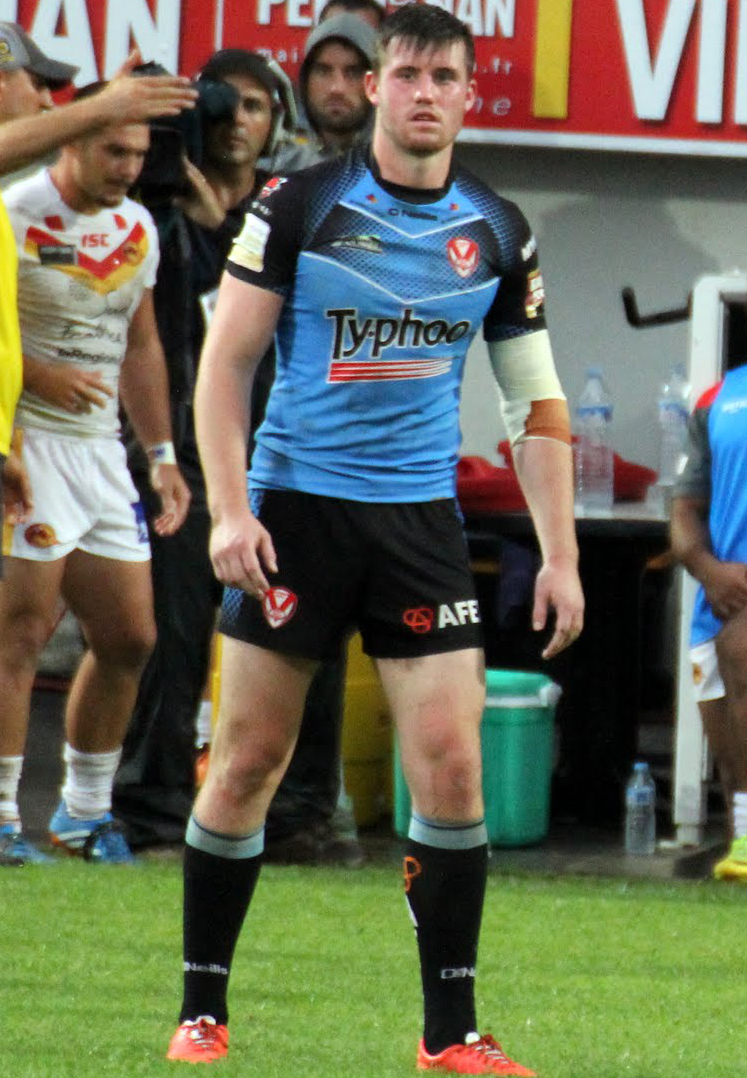

Personal information
- Born: 2 April 1993 (age 33) Oldham, Greater Manchester, England
- Height: 6 ft 3 in (1.90 m)
- Weight: 16 st 7 lb (105 kg)

Playing information
- Position: Second-row, Prop
Club
| Years | Team | Pld | T | G | FG | P |
|---|---|---|---|---|---|---|
| 2012–17 | St Helens | 77 | 26 | 0 | 0 | 104 |
| 2017–18 | Gold Coast Titans | 22 | 4 | 0 | 0 | 16 |
| 2018–20 | Wigan Warriors | 43 | 12 | 0 | 0 | 48 |
| 2020(loan) | → Leeds Rhinos | 0 | 0 | 0 | 0 | 0 |
| 2021– | Huddersfield Giants | 117 | 11 | 0 | 0 | 44 |
| | Total | 259 | 53 | 0 | 0 | 212 |
Representative
| Years | Team | Pld | T | G | FG | P |
| 2018 | England | 1 | 0 | 0 | 0 | 0 |
| 2019 | England Knights | 1 | 1 | 0 | 0 | 4 |
- Source: As of 2 April 2025
- Relatives: James Greenwood (brother)

Joe Greenwood (born 2 April 1993) is an English professional rugby league footballer who plays as a second-row forward for the Huddersfield Giants in the Super League, the England Knights and England at international level.

He played for St Helens and the Wigan Warriors in the Super League, and on loan from Wigan at the Leeds Rhinos in the top flight. Greenwood has also played for the Gold Coast Titans in the NRL.

== Background ==
Greenwood was born in Oldham, Greater Manchester, England.

He played his junior rugby league for the Saddleworth Rangers club.

== Career ==
=== St Helens ===
In 2014 won the Super League Championship with St Helens.

=== Gold Coast Titans ===
On 20 February 2017, he signed to play for the Gold Coast in the National Rugby League.

=== Wigan Warriors ===
He played in the 2018 Super League Grand Final victory over Warrington at Old Trafford.

=== Leeds Rhinos (loan) ===
On 25 February 2020, Wigan allowed Greenwood to sign a short eight-week loan with Leeds. On 16 March, the Rugby Football League announced the postponement all rugby league fixtures in England due to the COVID-19 pandemic, and Greenwood returned to Wigan without making an appearance for Leeds when the competition restarted in August.

=== Wigan Warriors (return) ===
He played in the 2020 Super League Grand Final which Wigan lost 8-4 against St Helens.

=== Huddersfield Giants ===
On 10 December 2020, it was announced that Greenwood would be joining Huddersfield on a two-year deal from the 2021 season. In round 2 of the 2021 Super League season, he was sent off after a dangerous high tackle in Huddersfield's 20-10 loss against the Catalans Dragons. On 28 May 2022, Greenwood played for Huddersfield in their 2022 Challenge Cup Final loss to Wigan. Greenwood played 14 matches with Huddersfield in the 2023 Super League season as the club finished ninth on the table and missed the playoffs. Greenwood played 14 games for Huddersfield in the 2024 Super League season as the club finished 9th for a second consecutive year. Greenwood played 23 matches for Huddersfield in the 2025 Super League season as the club finished 10th on the table.

== International career ==
In July 2018 he was selected in the England Knights Performance squad.

Greenwood made his full international début v New Zealand at Elland Road, Leeds on 11 November 2018, coming off the bench in the 0-34 defeat.
In 2019 he was selected for the England Knights against Jamaica at Headingley Rugby Stadium.

== Personal ==
Joe Greenwood's older brother, James Greenwood, also plays as a professional.
