= Luke Walsh =

Australian rugby league footballer

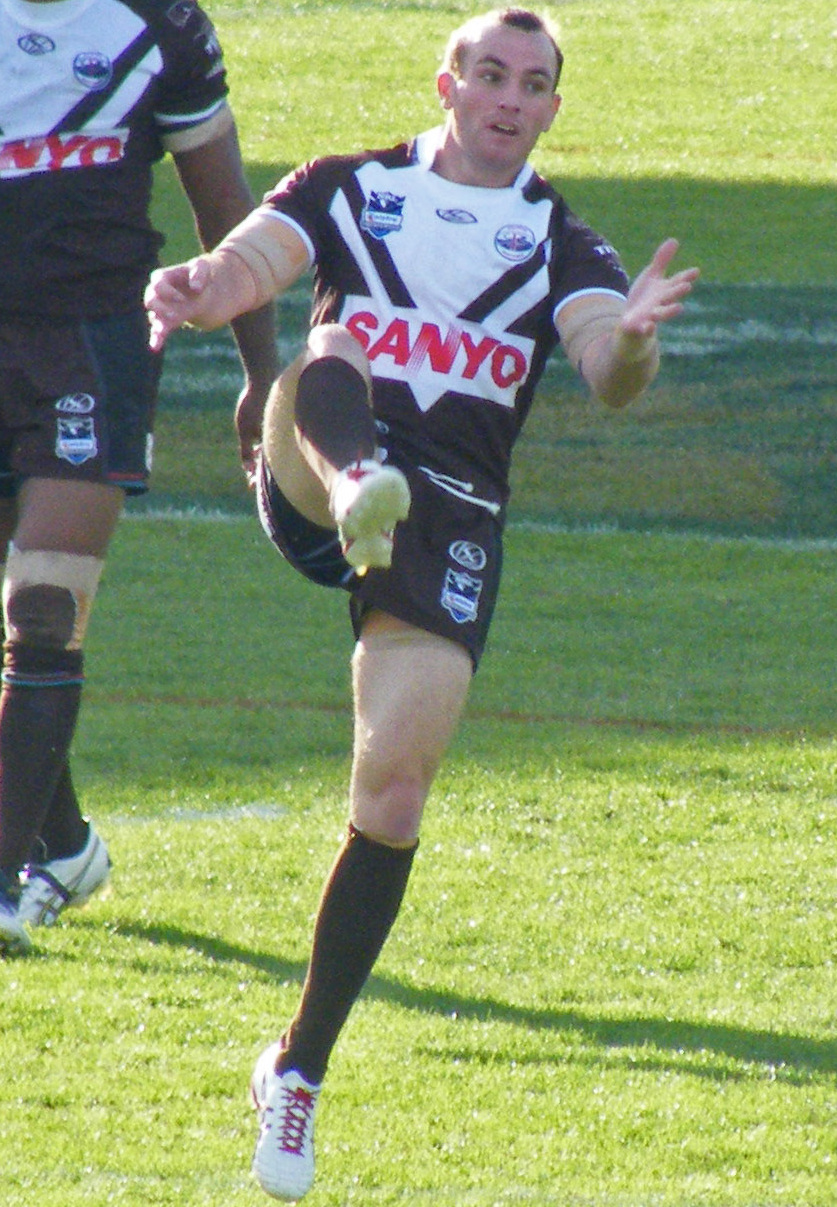

Personal information
- Full name: Luke Robert Walsh
- Born: 12 May 1987 (age 39) Waratah, New South Wales, Australia

Playing information
- Height: 173 cm (5 ft 8 in)
- Weight: 85 kg (13 st 5 lb)
- Position: Halfback, Five-eighth
Club
Years	Team	Pld	T	G	FG	P
2007–09	Newcastle Knights	13	1	0	2	6
2009–13	Penrith Panthers	107	24	154	10	358
2014–16	St Helens	64	15	198	10	466
2017–18	Catalans Dragons	32	3	98	4	212
	Total	216	43	450	26	1042

Luke Robert Walsh (born 12 May 1987) is an Australian former professional rugby league footballer who played for the Newcastle Knights and the Penrith Panthers in the Australian National Rugby League and for St Helens and the Catalans Dragons in the Super League. He played as a halfback or five-eighth.

== Playing career ==
Walsh came to prominence at Newcastle after the retirement of Andrew Johns and injuries to Jarrod Mullen during the 2007 season. Although hampered by an ankle injury which kept him out of premier league, Walsh was able to make his début at halfback in round 12 against the Sydney Roosters. Walsh underwent surgery on his ankle at the end of the season.

In mid-March 2009, Walsh signed with the Penrith Panthers, which would enable him to play for the Panthers in the 2009 season. Wearing jumper number 14, Walsh scored the opening try against the Gold Coast Titans on his Penrith debut. Walsh was named the Players' Player of the Panthers for 2011.

On 28 May 2013 Walsh agreed a deal with St. Helens. After two seasons at St Helens Walsh joined fellow Super League side Catalans Dragons. A mainstay of the team in 2017, Walsh was injured in the game against Hull Kingston Rovers in the third round of the 2018 season and on 24 April 2018 he announced his retirement from playing on medical advice. Walsh currently plays as a halfback for Central Charlestown Butcher Boys in the Newcastle Rugby League first grade competition.

On 25 Dec 2024 it was reported that he had signed for Macquarie Scorpions, playing in the Newcastle Rugby League, for the 2025 season.
