= Jonny Lomax =

Great Britain and England international rugby league footballer

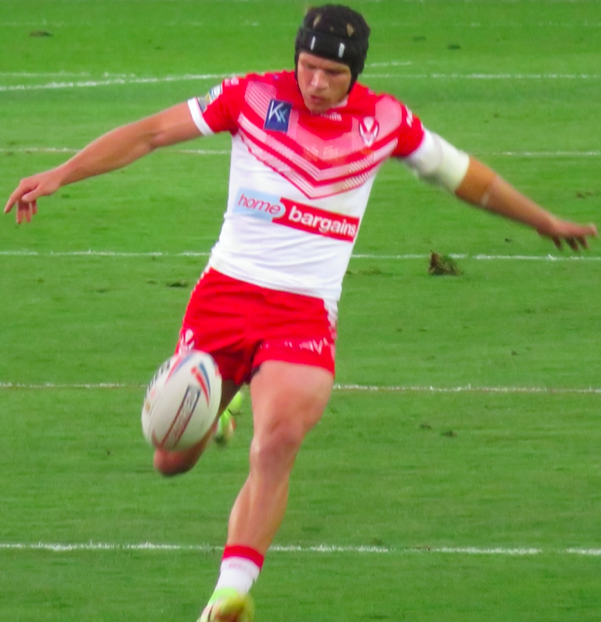

Personal information
- Full name: Jonathan Lomax
- Born: 4 September 1990 (age 36) Billinge, Wigan, England
- Height: 5 ft 10 in (1.78 m)
- Weight: 13 st 12 lb (88 kg)

Playing information
- Position: Stand-off, Scrum-half, Fullback, Wing
Club
Years	Team	Pld	T	G	FG	P
2009–26	St Helens	388	144	132	7	847
Representative
Years	Team	Pld	T	G	FG	P
2016–21	England	11	0	0	0	0
2019	Great Britain	4	0	0	0	0
- Source: As of 9 October 2026

Jonathan Lomax (born 4 September 1990) is a former English professional rugby league footballer who played for St Helens in the Super League, and England and Great Britain at international level. A versatile player, Lomax is primarily a stand-off but is equally comfortable at both scrum-half and fullback, and featured more regularly on the wing in the early stages of his professional career.

== Early life ==
Lomax was born in Billinge, Lancashire, England on 4 September 1990.

He played as a junior for Orrell St James, where he captained the side for some years, playing in his preferred stand-off position. He attended Rainford High Technology College in St Helens during his high school years. Lomax was injured quite seriously during a Year 9 Powergen Cup (Schools National Cup) quarter-final match, whereby he and an opposing player were both knocked unconscious in a collision. After regaining consciousness, he began vomiting and was taken to hospital, where he had to undergo emergency open skull surgery in order to relieve the pressure on his brain. Since then, Lomax has been synonymous with a protective headgear that he still wears in his professional career as a message to other youth players of the dangers of head injuries.

After his accident, Lomax continued his amateur career with Orrell and signed for St Helens professionally as a sixteen-year-old in 2006, after being on their books as a scholarship player previously.

== St Helens ==
Lomax made his first-team début for St. Helens in 2009's Super League XIV game against Wakefield Trinity in 2009, where he helped them to an easy 42–18 win. Following his début, he played and scored in the 66–6 Challenge Cup victory over Gateshead again playing on the wing in a man-of-the-match performance. He notched the first try of his Super League career in a 30–6 win over Hull F.C. whilst playing on the right wing in June. He took his try tally to three in four games for the Saints against Castleford, where he was again named man-of-the-match in a 50–10 win. After a spell in the reserves, he played in the 40–26 victory against Warrington where he came off the bench to play in a dummy-half role. He featured, albeit in a brief spell, for a second time in the season against Wakefield Trinity in a shock 22–20 loss. He was injured during this match and was out of action for 6 weeks. On his return, he played in a left Centre role in a 12–10 win over Huddersfield. He once again featured at full-back in the 24–12 end-of-regular-season loss to Catalans Dragons, where he kicked two goals from as many attempts. Lomax did not feature for St Helens in the end-of-season play-offs, which culminated in a third Grand Final loss to Leeds.

Lomax's opportunities in the first team continued in 2010, with his first game of the season coming in a 38–6 win at Bradford Bulls in round 2 of 2010's Super League XV, where he featured on the right wing in place of the injured Ade Gardner. It was this Gardner injury that meant Lomax notched his maiden brace of tries in first-grade football, when he scored twice in a 42–12 win at Catalans Dragons. Lomax's form was looking threatening in this spell, and he took his tally to three in four games with a score in the 22–16 home victory over the Wakefield Trinity Wildcats in the round 4 game. However, in the round 5 defeat by Hull Kingston Rovers, not only did Lomax's run of tries end, but his in the first team ended with a shoulder injury that meant he missed 6 weeks of action, which was ironically subsided by Gardners' return from his particular injury. On return, he played wing in a 42–34 loss away to Salford, and fullback, in a 68–12 win over Rovers, scoring one try and kicking three goals. His first appearance in the 2010 Challenge Cup came in the quarter-final 32–12 win over Barrow, where Lomax continued his try-scoring form and run as chief goal kicker with one try and three goals from five attempts. He shifted back to the wing for a 27–26 loss at Hull, where Lomax kicked three out of five again. He missed the next two matches due to injury, but kicked nine out of ten goals in a return at home to Salford, where he was on the winning side in a 58–34 success, and scored one try and kicked four goals in a 28–24 loss to Leeds. He kicked two goals in a 20–30 loss to Catalans Dragons, and four goals in a 32–18 win over Harlequins the week later. Lomax continued his run in the St Helens first team and played on the wing in their 2010 Super League Grand Final defeat by Wigan.

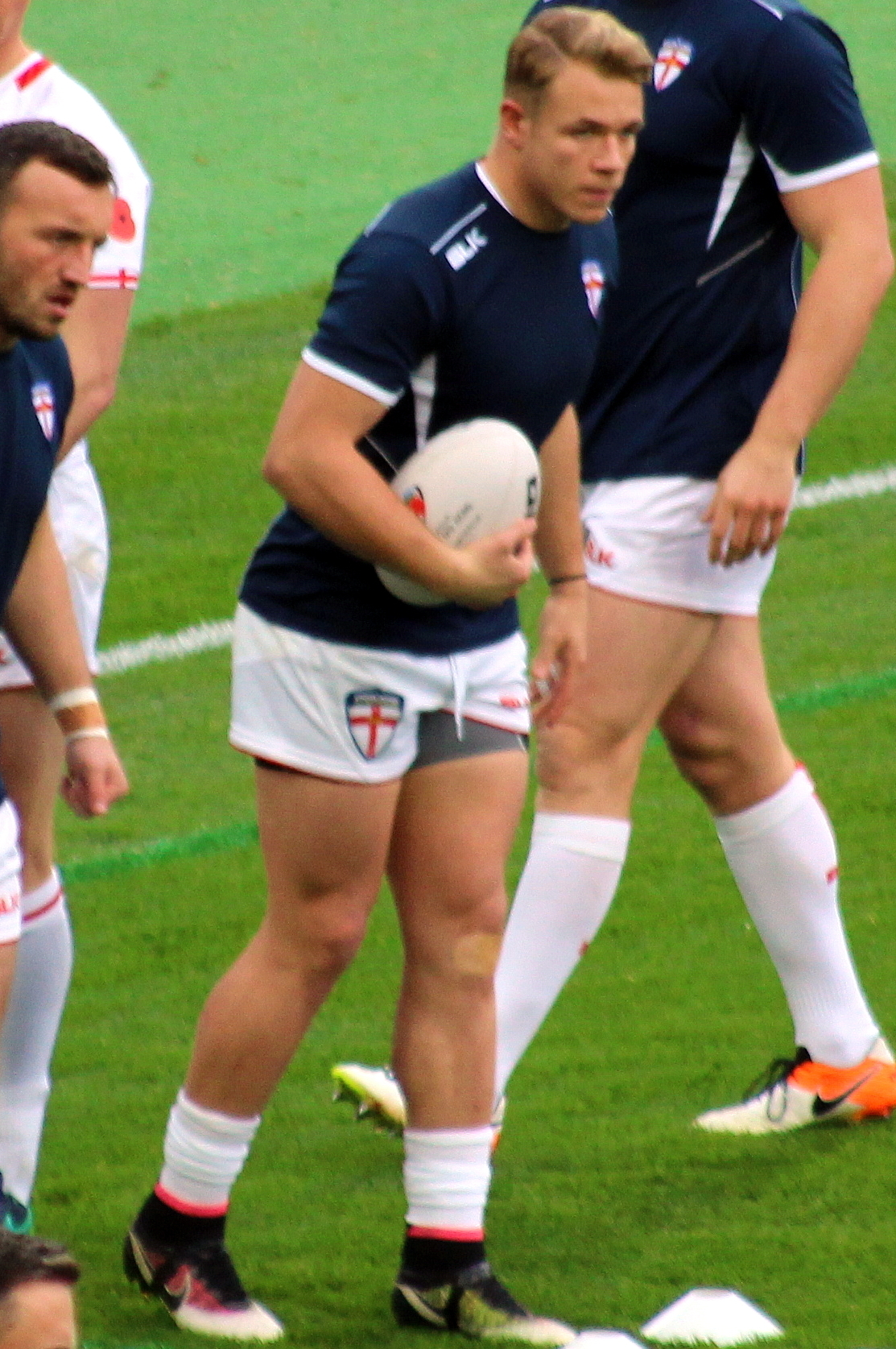
Lomax warming up for England in 2016

Lomax enjoyed a breakthrough 2011 season, forming a makeshift halfback partnership with fellow youngster Lee Gaskell that saw St Helens reach another Grand Final, however they were unsuccessful, once again beaten by the Leeds Rhinos at Old Trafford.

Lomax was handed the No. 7 jersey in 2012 as a result and enjoyed another good season, scoring 14 tries as the club's first-choice scrum-half, however Saints' run of successive Grand Final appearances came to an end as they were beaten by Warrington in the qualifying semi-final.

In 2013, Lomax was moved to the fullback position by coach Nathan Brown, and played 19 times, scoring 12 tries and kicking 25 goals as St Helens once again narrowly missed out on a Grand Final appearance. In 2014 Lomax played in the first 13 matches for St Helens before being ruled out for the remainder of the season after suffering a severe knee injury in a 42–0 defeat against Catalans Dragons. Prior to this, his form at fullback had seen him earn a call up to the England squad for their mid-season training camp. As a result of his injury, Lomax missed St Helens' 2014 Super League Grand Final victory.

Lomax returned at the start of the 2015 season, but lasted only four games before injuring the same knee, once again ruling him out for the entire season. His continued absence, along with the retirement through injury of Lance Hohaia and Paul Wellens, forced St Helens to bring in several short-term replacements, including Shannon McDonnell and Adam Quinlan.

He played in the 2019 Challenge Cup Final defeat by the Warrington Wolves at Wembley Stadium.

He played in the 2019 Super League Grand Final victory over the Salford Red Devils at Old Trafford.

Lomax played in the club's 8-4 2020 Super League Grand Final victory over Wigan at the Kingston Communications Stadium in Hull.

On 17 July 2021, Lomax played for St. Helens in their 26-12 2021 Challenge Cup Final victory over Castleford. On 9 October 2021, Lomax played for St. Helens in their 2021 Super League Grand Final victory over Catalans Dragons. Lomax set up the winning try in the second half of the final after he put a short kick through for teammate Kevin Naiqama to score. In round 18 of the 2022 Super League season, Lomax scored the winning try for St Helens with only one minute remaining as the club defeated Wigan 20-18 at Magic Weekend. On 24 September 2022, Lomax played in St Helens 2022 Super League Grand Final victory over Leeds and was awarded the Harry Sunderland Trophy as man of the match. On 18 February 2023, Lomax played in St Helens 13-12 upset victory over Penrith in the 2023 World Club Challenge. Lomax played 29 games for St Helens in the 2023 Super League season as the club finished third on the table. Lomax played in St Helens narrow loss against the Catalans Dragons in the semi-final which ended St Helens four-year dominance of the competition. In round 9 of the 2024 Super League season, Lomax kicked the winning drop goal for St Helens as they won 13-12 over Huddersfield with less than a minute remaining. Lomax played 22 matches for St Helens in the 2024 Super League season which saw the club finish sixth on the table. He played in St Helens golden point extra-time playoff loss against Warrington. Lomax played 26 games for St Helens in the 2025 Super League season including the clubs semi-final loss against Hull Kingston Rovers. In round 2 of the 2026 Super League season, Lomax was taken off within the first five minutes during St Helens narrow win over Leigh. It was later revealed that Lomax had dislocated his wrist and would be out for an extended period. He required surgery to fix a fractured jaw he suffered in round 14's defeat against Warrington. In his last match on 11 September 2026, before retirement, he scored two tries and kicked one goal against Hull Kingston Rovers. In August 2026, Lomax announced that he would be retiring at the end of the season.

== International career ==
Lomax was selected in England's 24-man squad for the 2016 Four Nations. He made his international début in a test match against France.

In October 2017 he was selected in the England squad for the 2017 Rugby League World Cup.

He was selected in squad for the 2019 Great Britain Lions tour of the Southern Hemisphere. He made his Great Britain test debut in the defeat by Tonga.

== Personal life ==
In 2024 he graduated with a first-class degree in Physiotherapy from the University of Salford.
