= Alex Walmsley =

GB & England international rugby league footballer

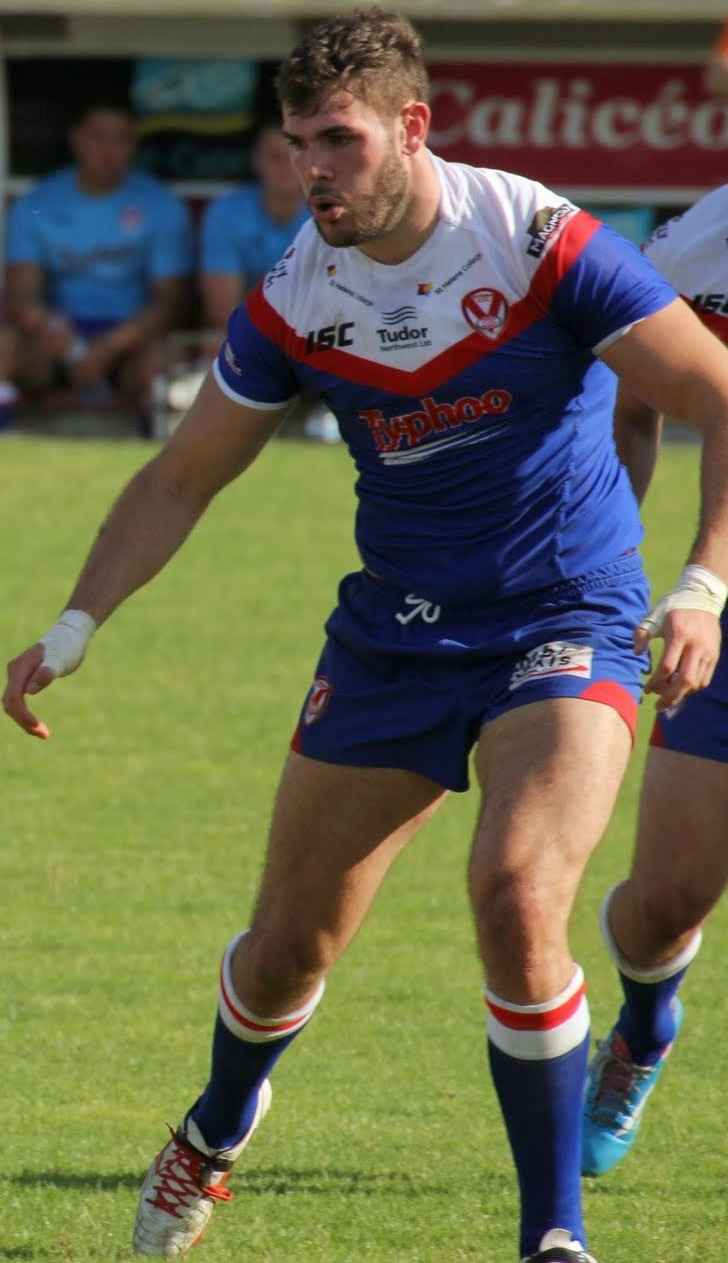

Personal information
- Full name: Alexander Simon Walmsley
- Born: 10 April 1990 (age 36) Dewsbury, West Yorkshire, England
- Height: 6 ft 5 in (1.96 m)
- Weight: 18 st 2 lb (115 kg)

Playing information
- Position: Prop
Club
Years	Team	Pld	T	G	FG	P
2012	Batley Bulldogs	19	7	0	0	28
2013–	St Helens	333	59	0	0	236
2013(loan)	→ Batley Bulldogs	3	0	0	0	0
	Total	355	66	0	0	264
Representative
Years	Team	Pld	T	G	FG	P
2017–25	England	9	1	0	0	4
2019	Great Britain	4	0	0	0	0
- Source: As of 4 November 2026

Alex Walmsley (born 10 April 1990) is an English professional rugby league footballer who plays as a prop for St Helens in the Super League, and England and Great Britain at international level.

He previously played for the Batley Bulldogs in the Championship and has spent time on loan from Saints at his former club in the second tier.

== Background ==
Walmsley was born in Dewsbury, West Yorkshire, England.

== Club career ==
Walmsley started his career in the amateur leagues, playing for Dewsbury Celtic, and his university team, Leeds Met Carnegie. In 2011, he received the National Conference League player of the year award.

In February 2012, Walmsley signed for Batley following a spell on trial at the club. He won Batley's player of the year award and the Championship Young Player of the Year during his only season with the club, before signing with St Helens for the start of the 2013 season.

Walmsley briefly returned to Batley at the start of 2013 on a dual registration before establishing himself in the St Helens first team that season.

St Helens reached the 2014 Super League Grand Final, and Walmsley was selected to play from the interchange bench in their 14–6 victory over the Wigan Warriors at Old Trafford.

Walmsley's form in 2015 saw him named to the Super League Dream Team for the first time as well as earning him a nomination for the Man of Steel award.

He played in the 2019 Challenge Cup Final defeat by the Warrington Wolves at Wembley Stadium.

He played in the 2019 Super League Grand Final victory over the Salford Red Devils at Old Trafford.

Walmsley played in St Helens 8-4 2020 Super League Grand Final victory over Wigan at the Kingston Communications Stadium in Hull.

On 17 July 2021, he played for St. Helens in their 26-12 2021 Challenge Cup Final victory over Castleford. On 9 October 2021, he played for St. Helens in their 2021 Super League Grand Final victory over Catalans Dragons. It was the club's third successive championship victory in a row. On 13 September 2022, Walmsley was ruled out for the remainder of the 2022 Super League season and the World Cup with a foot injury. On 18 February 2023, Walmsley played in St Helens 13-12 upset victory over Penrith in the 2023 World Club Challenge. In round 2 of the 2023 Super League season, Walmsley scored two tries for St Helens in a 24-6 victory over Castleford. In the 2023 Challenge Cup semi-final, Walmsley suffered a knee injury following a cannonball tackle from Leigh player John Asiata. St Helens would go on to lose the match 12-10 and Walmsley was later ruled out for 12 weeks. Walmsley played 18 games for St Helens in the 2023 Super League season as the club finished third on the table. He played in St Helens narrow loss against the Catalans Dragons in the semi-final which stopped them reaching a fifth successive grand final. Walmsley played 13 matches for St Helens in the 2024 Super League season which saw the club finish sixth on the table. He played in St Helens golden point extra-time playoff loss against Warrington. Walmsley played 28 games for St Helens in the 2025 Super League season including the clubs 20-12 semi-final loss against Hull Kingston Rovers. Walmsley played 18 matches for St Helens in the 2026 Super League season as the club finished 7th on the table missing the playoffs.

== International career ==
Walmsley was a member of the England team which played in the 2017 Rugby League World Cup. In the final against Australia, Walmsley came off the bench in England's 6–0 defeat.

He was selected in squad for the 2019 Great Britain Lions tour of the Southern Hemisphere. He made his Great Britain test debut in the defeat by Tonga. Walmsley played for England in the 2025 Rugby League Ashes series.
