= 2019 Great Britain Lions tour =

Great Britain rugby league tour

- Date: 26 October 2019 – 16 November 2019
- Coach(es): Wayne Bennett
- Tour captain(s): James Graham
- Top point scorer(s): Gareth Widdop (12)
- Top try scorer(s): Josh Hodgson (2)
Summary
P	W	D	L
Total
4	0	0	4
Opponent
P	W	D	L
Tonga
1	0	0	1
New Zealand
2	0	0	2
Papua New Guinea
1	0	0	1

Tour chronology
- Previous tour: Pacific 1996

The 2019 Great Britain Lions tour was a tour by the Great Britain national rugby league team to the New Zealand and Papua New Guinea in 2019.

== Background ==
IRL World Rankings
Official Men's Rankings as of July 2019
Rank	Change*	Team	Pts%
2	Steady	England (Note: Great Britain have not been affiliated with the International Rugby League since 2007. England is used to represent Great Britain's rank as all but one of the Great Britain squad were England players.)	
3	Steady	New Zealand	
4	Steady	Tonga	
10	Steady	Papua New Guinea	

This tour was the first matches played by the Lions since 2007 when they defeated New Zealand 3–0 during the New Zealand tour that year. The last time the Lions travelled to Australasia was for the 2006 Tri-Nations tournament and the last full Lions tour was in 1996.

After the 2007 New Zealand tour to Great Britain the Great Britain Lions were disbanded and more emphasis was placed on the four home nations; England, Ireland, Scotland and Wales. In 2017 the Rugby League International Federation (RLIF) announced a four-year cycle of tours and tournaments to include the resurrection of the Great Britain Lions and a tour by the team to the Southern Hemisphere. At the RLIF's 2018 meeting a proposal by the Australian Rugby League Commission for the Lions tour to be postponed in favour of a tour to Europe by the Australian Kangaroos was rejected and the 2017 announced cycle was confirmed.

== Squad ==
The 24-man Great Britain squad was named on 14 October 2019. Ages are as of 26 October 2019.

Following injuries to Gildart and Hall, Ash Handley was called into the squad on 7 November.

Nat.	Pos.	Player	Date of birth (age)	Club
England	Stand-off	Blake Austin	1 February 1991 (aged 28)	Warrington Wolves
England	Second-row	John Bateman	30 September 1993 (aged 26)	Canberra Raiders
England	Prop	Tom Burgess	21 April 1992 (aged 27)	South Sydney Rabbitohs
England	Hooker	Daryl Clark	10 February 1993 (aged 26)	Warrington Wolves
England	Centre	Jake Connor	18 October 1994 (aged 25)	Hull F.C.
Scotland	Fullback	Lachlan Coote	6 April 1990 (aged 29)	St Helens
England	Centre	Oliver Gildart	6 August 1996 (aged 23)	Wigan Warriors
England	Prop	James Graham (captain)	10 September 1985 (aged 34)	St. George Illawarra Dragons
England	Wing	Ryan Hall	27 November 1987 (aged 31)	Sydney Roosters
England	Wing	Ash Handley	16 February 1996 (aged 23)	Leeds Rhinos
England	Fullback	Zak Hardaker	17 October 1991 (aged 28)	Wigan Warriors
England	Stand-off	Jackson Hastings	4 January 1996 (aged 23)	Salford Red Devils
England	Prop	Chris Hill	3 November 1987 (aged 31)	Warrington Wolves
England	Hooker	Josh Hodgson	31 October 1989 (aged 29)	Canberra Raiders
England	Second-row	Jack Hughes	4 January 1992 (aged 27)	Warrington Wolves
England	Second-row	Josh Jones	12 May 1993 (aged 26)	Salford Red Devils
England	Stand-off	Jonny Lomax	4 September 1990 (aged 29)	St Helens
England	Wing	Jermaine McGillvary	16 May 1988 (aged 31)	Huddersfield Giants
England	Second-row	Joe Philbin	16 November 1994 (aged 24)	Warrington Wolves
England	Prop	Luke Thompson	27 April 1995 (aged 24)	St Helens
England	Stand-off	Jacob Trueman	16 February 1999 (aged 20)	Castleford Tigers
England	Prop	Alex Walmsley	10 April 1990 (aged 29)	St Helens
England	Second-row	Elliott Whitehead	4 September 1989 (aged 30)	Canberra Raiders
England	Scrum-half	Gareth Widdop	12 March 1989 (aged 30)	St. George Illawarra Dragons
England	Scrum-half	George Williams	31 October 1994 (aged 24)	Wigan Warriors

== Itinerary ==
At the RLIF congress in November 2018 a provisional tour was arranged with Great Britain to play tests against New Zealand, Papua New Guinea, Tonga, Fiji and Samoa with the exact locations and dates being subject to ratification by the various national league and player organisations. In March 2019 it was confirmed that test matches would only be played against New Zealand, Papua New Guinea and Tonga.

In September 2019 the Tongan National Rugby League's membership of the RLIF was suspended and in order to fulfil the fixture against the Lions a Tongan Invitational XIII was selected to play against Great Britain. The members of the suspended Tonga board labelled the invitational side as a 'rebel' squad and insisted that the game against Great Britain could not be classed as a test match. The International Rugby League (the RLIF was rebranded earlier in October 2019) disagreed and gave the match test status.

== Test Venues ==
Hamilton	Auckland	Christchurch	Port Moresby
Waikato Stadium	Eden Park	Rugby League Park	PNG Football Stadium
Capacity: 25,800	Capacity: 50,000	Capacity: 18,000	Capacity: 14,800

== Fixtures ==
=== New Zealand leg ===
26 October 2019
20:10 NZDT (UTC+13)

Tonga	14–6	Great Britain
Tries: Jennings, Katoa; Goals: Taukeiaho (3/3)	Report	Tries: Bateman; Goals: Widdop (1/1)

Waikato Stadium, Hamilton
Attendance: 9,420
Referee: Chris Kendall (England)

Team details

FB	1	William Hopoate
WG	2	David Fusitu'a
CE	3	Michael Jennings
CE	19	Konrad Hurrell
WG	5	Daniel Tupou
FE	6	Tuimoala Lolohea
HB	20	Tesi Niu
PR	15	Addin Fonua-Blake
HK	9	Siliva Havili
PR	10	Sio Siua Taukeiaho (c)
SR	11	Ben Murdoch-Masila
SR	12	Manu Ma'u
LK	13	Jason Taumalolo (c)
Interchange:
BE	8	Andrew Fifita
BE	14	Sione Katoa
BE	16	John Asiata
BE	17	Sitili Tupouniua
Coach:
Kristian Woolf

FB	1	Lachlan Coote
WG	2	Jermaine McGillvary
CE	3	Zak Hardaker
CE	4	Oliver Gildart
WG	5	Ryan Hall
SO	6	Gareth Widdop
SH	7	Jackson Hastings
PR	8	Chris Hill
HK	9	Josh Hodgson
PR	10	Luke Thompson
SR	11	John Bateman
SR	12	Elliott Whitehead
LF	13	James Graham (c)
Interchange:
BE	14	Josh Jones
BE	15	Tom Burgess
BE	16	Jonny Lomax
BE	17	Alex Walmsley
Coach:
Wayne Bennett

Touch judges:
Chris Butler (Australia)
Chris McMillan (New Zealand)
Video referee:
Jared Maxwell (Australia)

Notes:

- Tesi Niu (Tonga), Jackson Hastings, and Josh Jones (both Great Britain) made their Test debuts. Hastings and Jones were the only Great Britain players to have not previously represented their home nation.
- James Graham (Great Britain) made his 50th Test appearance – his 6th for Great Britain, with 44 for England. He became the 4th Briton and 8th person overall to do so.
- James Graham (Great Britain) is the only player to have previously played for the Lions, who were last active in 2007.

2 November 2019
17:00 NZDT (UTC+13)

New Zealand	12–8	Great Britain
Tries: Isaako, Harawira-Naera; Goals: Isaako (2/3)	Report	Tries: Clark; Goals: Widdop (2/3)

Eden Park, Auckland
Attendance: 25,575
Referee: Chris Kendall (England)

Team details

FB	1	Roger Tuivasa-Sheck
WG	2	Ken Maumalo
CE	3	Charnze Nicoll-Klokstad
CE	4	Joseph Manu
WG	5	Jamayne Isaako
FE	6	Kieran Foran
HB	7	Benji Marshall (c)
PR	8	Zane Tetevano
HK	21	Kodi Nikorima
PR	10	Jared Waerea-Hargreaves
SR	11	Briton Nikora
SR	12	Kenny Bromwich
LK	13	Joseph Tapine
Interchange:
BE	14	Jahrome Hughes
BE	15	Corey Harawira-Naera
BE	16	Leeson Ah Mau
BE	17	Adam Blair
Coach:
Michael Maguire

FB	1	Jonny Lomax
WG	2	Jermaine McGillvary
CE	3	Zak Hardaker
CE	4	Jake Connor
WG	5	Ryan Hall
SO	6	Gareth Widdop
SH	7	Jackson Hastings
PR	8	Chris Hill
HK	9	Josh Hodgson
PR	10	Tom Burgess
SR	11	John Bateman
SR	12	Elliott Whitehead
LF	13	James Graham (c)
Interchange:
BE	14	Josh Jones
BE	15	Joe Philbin
BE	16	Daryl Clark
BE	17	Alex Walmsley
Coach:
Wayne Bennett

Touch judges:
Chris Butler (Australia)
Chris McMillan (New Zealand)
Video referee:
Henry Perenara (New Zealand)

Notes:

- Adam Blair (New Zealand) made his 50th Test appearance for New Zealand becoming the 2nd New Zealander and 9th person overall to do so.

9 November 2019
20:00 NZDT (UTC+13)

New Zealand	23–8	Great Britain
Tries: Manu, Johnson, Maumalo; Goals: Isaako (5/7); Drop goals: Isaako		Tries: Hodgson; Goals: Widdop (2/2)

Rugby League Park, Christchurch
Attendance: 8,875
Referee: Gerard Sutton (Australia)

Team details

FB	1	Roger Tuivasa-Sheck
WG	2	Ken Maumalo
CE	3	Charnze Nicoll-Klokstad
CE	4	Joseph Manu
WG	5	Jamayne Isaako
FE	6	Shaun Johnson
HB	7	Benji Marshall (c)
PR	8	Zane Tetevano
HK	9	Brandon Smith
PR	10	Jared Waerea-Hargreaves
SR	11	Briton Nikora
SR	15	Kevin Proctor
LK	13	Joseph Tapine
Interchange:
BE	12	Corey Harawira-Naera
BE	14	Kodi Nikorima
BE	16	Leeson Ah Mau
BE	17	Adam Blair
Coach:
Michael Maguire

FB	1	Jonny Lomax
WG	2	Jermaine McGillvary
CE	3	Jack Hughes
CE	4	Jake Connor
WG	18	Blake Austin
SO	6	Gareth Widdop
SH	7	Jackson Hastings
PR	8	Chris Hill
HK	9	Josh Hodgson
PR	10	Tom Burgess
SR	11	John Bateman
SR	12	Elliott Whitehead
LF	13	James Graham (c)
Interchange:
BE	14	Josh Jones
BE	16	Daryl Clark
BE	17	Alex Walmsley
BE	20	Luke Thompson
Coach:
Wayne Bennett

Touch judges:
Chris McMillan (New Zealand)
Dave Munro (Australia)
Video referee:
Henry Perenara (New Zealand)

Notes:

- Blake Austin and Jack Hughes (both Great Britain) made their Test debuts, having not previously represented their home nation.

=== Papua New Guinea leg ===
16 November 2019
17:30 (UTC+10)

Papua New Guinea	28–10	Great Britain
Tries: Boas, Ipape, Johnston, Olam, Putt; Goals: Martin (3/4), Laybutt (1/1)	Report	Tries: Austin, Hodgson; Goals: Widdop (1/2)

PNG Football Stadium, Port Moresby
Referee: Grant Atkins (Australia)

Team details

FB	1	Alex Johnston
WG	2	Edene Gebbie
CE	3	David Mead
CE	4	Justin Olam
WG	5	Stargroth Amean
FE	6	Kyle Laybutt
HB	7	Watson Boas
PR	8	Wellington Albert
HK	9	Wartovo Puara Jr
PR	10	Luke Page
SR	11	Nixon Putt
SR	12	Daniel Russell
LK	13	Rhyse Martin (c)
Interchange:
BE	14	Edwin Ipape
BE	15	Garry Lo
BE	16	Stanton Albert
BE	17	Moses Meninga
Coach:
Michael Marum

FB	1	Jonny Lomax
WG	2	Jermaine McGillvary
CE	3	Jack Hughes
CE	4	Jake Connor
WG	5	Blake Austin
SO	6	Gareth Widdop
SH	7	Jackson Hastings
PR	8	Chris Hill
HK	9	Josh Hodgson
PR	10	Tom Burgess
SR	11	John Bateman
SR	12	Elliott Whitehead
LF	13	James Graham (c)
Interchange:
BE	15	Luke Thompson
BE	17	Alex Walmsley
BE	18	Joe Philbin
BE	19	George Williams
Coach:
Wayne Bennett

Touch judges:
Hanua Rupa (Papua New Guinea)
Mexi Topani (Papua New Guinea)
Video referee:
Shayne Hayne (Australia)

== Aftermath ==
The tour failed to live up to expectations, with Great Britain failing to win a single match on the tour. Coach Wayne Bennett, whose contract with the RFL expired at the end of the tour, was heavily criticised for his team selections. Six half-backs were chosen in the initial 24-man squad, but injuries during the tour resulted in stand-off Blake Austin being deployed as an emergency winger due a shortage of other players at the position. Bennett was also criticised for placing too much focus on England players – Lachlan Coote was the only player selected outside of the England setup, while Welsh-born Regan Grace, who had recently won the 2019 Super League Grand Final with St Helens, reportedly wasn't even considered for selection.

RFL rugby director Kevin Sinfield defended the squad selection, but conceded that there had been less interest than expected in the revival of the Lions tour, with attendances on the New Zealand leg of the tour being lower than expected. Bennett's contract was ultimately not renewed, and he was replaced as England coach by Shaun Wane.

In November 2020, a documentary covering the tour, titled "Once Were Lions", was released on BBC iPlayer.
