= Josh Hodgson =

Great Britain and England international rugby league footballer

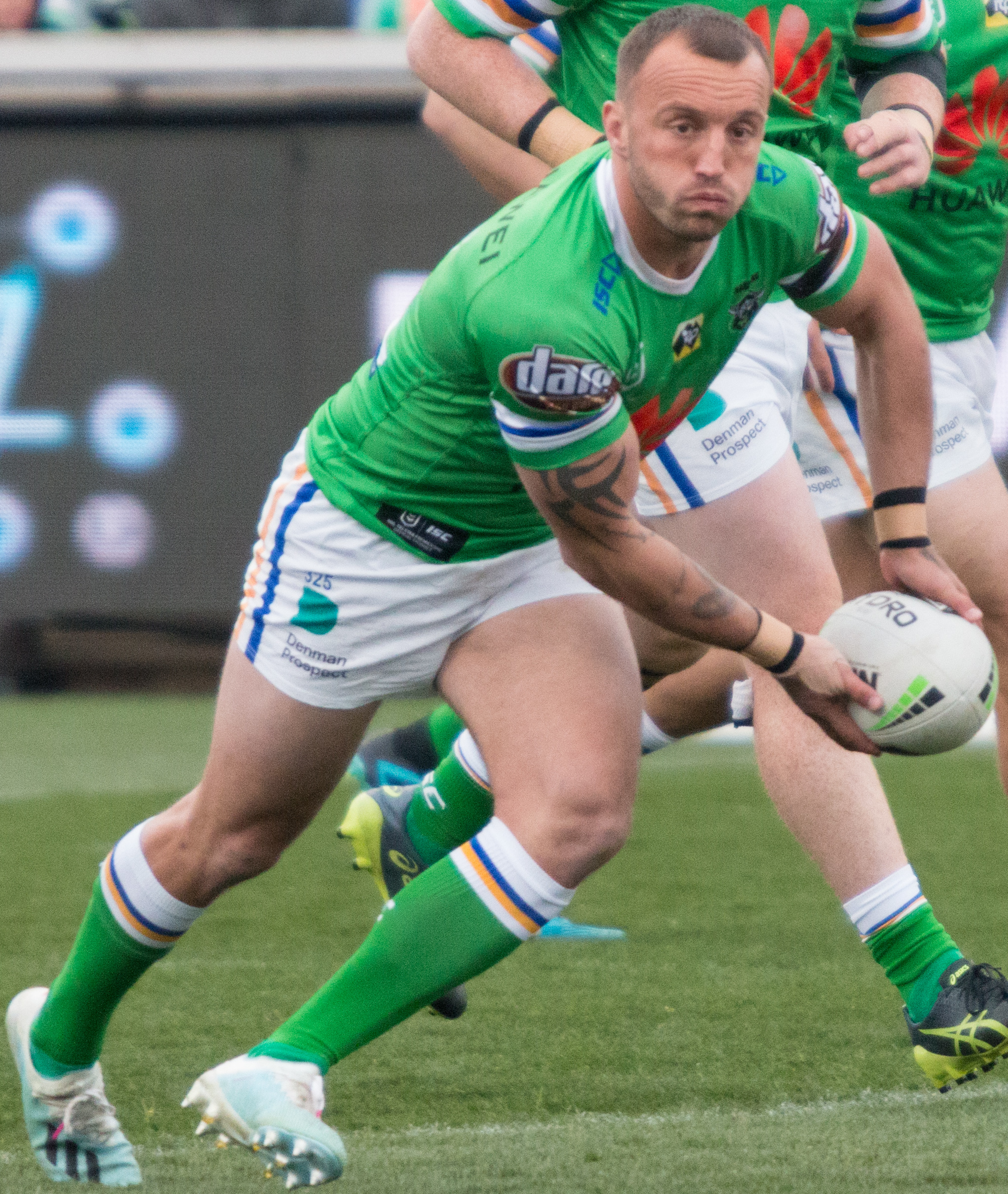

Personal information
- Full name: Joshua Hodgson
- Born: 31 October 1989 (age 37) Hull, England

Playing information
- Height: 180 cm (5 ft 11 in)
- Weight: 94 kg (14 st 11 lb)
- Position: Hooker
Club
Years	Team	Pld	T	G	FG	P
2009	Hull FC	2	0	0	0	0
2010–14	Hull Kingston Rovers	134	36	0	0	144
2015–22	Canberra Raiders	138	14	0	0	56
2023	Parramatta Eels	12	1	0	0	4
	Total	286	51	0	0	204
Representative
Years	Team	Pld	T	G	FG	P
2012–13	England Knights	2	1	0	0	4
2014–18	England	19	3	0	0	12
2019	Great Britain	4	2	0	0	8
- Relatives: Bailey Hodgson (nephew)

Joshua Hodgson (born 31 October 1989) is an English former rugby league footballer who played primarily as a hooker, and has represented England and Great Britain at an international level.

He has previously played for Hull FC and Hull Kingston Rovers in the Super League and for the Canberra Raiders and Parramatta Eels in the National Rugby League.

Hodgson began his senior club career with Hull F.C. after progressing through their Academy system, making his first team début in 2009. Due to limited first team opportunities, he joined Hull Kingston Rovers at the end of the 2009 season, where he established himself in the first team and went on to make over 100 appearances. At the end of the 2014 season, he moved to Canberra Raiders.

An England international, Hodgson made his senior international début in October 2014, and represented England at the Four Nations and 2017 World Cup.

Hodgson has suffered three career threatening Anterior Cruciate Ligament (ACL) injuries, in 2018, 2020 and 2022, on both knees. He suffered a neck injury in 2023 whilst playing for the Parramatta Eels which forced him to retire.

== Background ==
Hodgson was born on 31 October 1989 in Kingston upon Hull, England, where he grew up on a housing estate with his mum and step father, one brother, and 5 half-brothers. His step father, Dave, briefly played rugby league for both Hull FC and Hull Kingston Rovers before turning to coaching at amateur level.

Hodgson played junior rugby league with East Hull, where he was coached by former Hull player Lee Radford.

== Club career ==
=== Hull FC ===
Hodgson joined Hull as a scholarship player at the age of 13. Hodgson represented England at under-17's and 18's level, and progressed through the club's academy ranks before being promoted to the first team for the start of the 2009 season. He made his Super League début in May 2009 against Warrington Wolves. He played two games during the season as a back row forward, which coach Richard Agar believed to be his best position. Seeking more regular first team opportunities, Hodgson left Hull at the end of the season to join Hull Kingston Rovers.

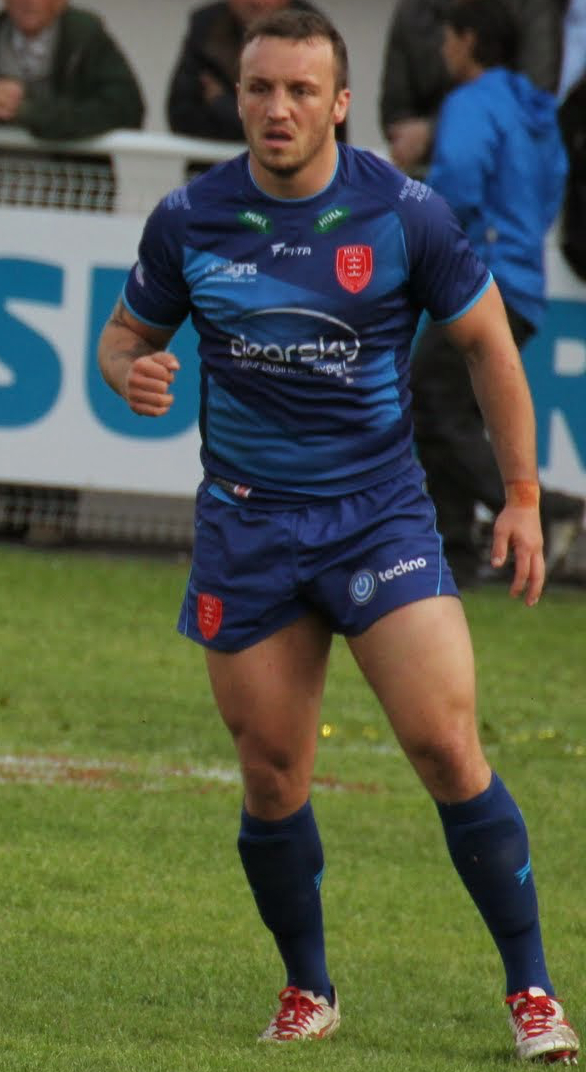
Hodgson playing for Hull KR in 2014

=== Hull Kingston Rovers ===
Hodgson joined Hull KR on a two-year contract, and was signed as the club's second-choice hooker behind Ben Fisher following the departure of Daniel Fitzhenry. He had an impressive 2012 season, scoring 14 tries and winning the club's player of the year and players' player of the year awards, and was rewarded with a new four-year contract. Hodgson made his 100th appearance for the club during the 2013 season, and won the players' player of the year award for the second successive year. The departure of Michael Dobson at the end of the 2013 season meant that Hodgson, along with scrum-half Travis Burns, were named co-captains for the 2014 season.

=== Canberra Raiders ===
On 4 August 2014, it was announced that Hodgson had agreed to sign for National Rugby League side Canberra Raiders for the 2015 season on a two-year deal, with Canberra paying a "substantial transfer fee" to Hull KR for Hodgson's services.

Hodgson made his début against Cronulla-Sutherland Sharks in March 2015, and went on to make 24 appearances during the 2015 season, scoring two tries, including a game winning golden point try against Parramatta.

Hodgson enjoyed a breakthrough season in 2016 as he led Canberra to a top-two finish, the first for the club since the 1995 ARL season. Hodgson made 26 appearances during the season, and was considered a front-runner to win the Dally M Medal for most of the season, but was effectively ruled out after a suspension for a grapple tackle on Melbourne Storm prop Jesse Bromwich cost him three points and a missed game. In his first NRL finals appearance, he would inspire the Raiders to a twelve-point lead over the Cronulla-Sutherland Sharks, however, he would miss out on most of the second half due to an ankle injury. This was the turning point in the match as Cronulla-Sutherland would record a 16-14 win. In the lead up to the semi-final against the Penrith Panthers much speculation rested on whether Hodgson would play. He was cleared to play and was a standout in the 22-12 triumph. The season would end in Melbourne the following week in a close 14-12 loss. Hodgson was selected by Wayne Bennett for the England Four Nations team.

Hodgson missed the first 14 games of the 2018 NRL season with a knee injury and made his first appearance of the year in Canberra's 48-12 victory over the Wests Tigers in round 15.

He joined the leadership team by being appointed as the co-captain for the Canberra. Hodgson made a total of 24 appearances for Canberra in the 2019 NRL season as the club reached their first grand final in 25 years. Hodgson played in the club's 2019 NRL Grand Final defeat against the Sydney Roosters at ANZ Stadium.

In the 2020 NRL season, Hodgson made nine appearances as Canberra finished 5th and qualified for the finals. He missed the club's finals campaign due to injury.

Hodgson made 20 appearances for Canberra in the 2021 NRL season as the club finished a disappointing 10th on the table. On 10 December 2021, Hodgson signed a two-year deal to join Parramatta starting in the 2023 season. In round 1 of the 2022 NRL season, Hodgson was taken from the field during Canberra's victory over Cronulla with a suspected knee injury. The following week, Hodgson was ruled out of the entire 2022 NRL season with an ACL injury.

=== Parramatta Eels ===
Hodgson made his club debut for Parramatta in round 1 of the 2023 NRL season against Melbourne. Parramatta would lose 16-12 in golden point extra-time. On 30 August 2023, Hodgson announced his retirement from rugby league after suffering a neck injury in round 13 of the competition. Hodgson announced via his social media account he was retiring writing “This is never the way I thought I’d be announcing the end of my footy career, but unfortunately I have been forced to medically retire".

== International career ==
In 2012, Hodgson was called up to the England Knights squad to play Ireland, scoring a try in a 62–4 win. In October 2013, he was named captain of England Knights while being first standby for the senior squad.

In 2014, Hodgson was selected for the England squad for the 2014 Four Nations in Australia. He made his début in the opening game against Samoa, and also played in the second match against Australia, but was dropped for the final game against New Zealand. Hodgson was disciplined by England after he was filmed smashing through a door at a student flat in Dunedin following the New Zealand game, an incident which he later admitted he was embarrassed about and was out-of-character.

In 2015, Hodgson was named in the 24-man England team that played New Zealand in a three match test-series held in England. Beforehand England took on France in a test match held in Leigh. Josh scored a try in England's try scoring rout over their opponents. He scored his second test try a week later in England's 26-12 win over New Zealand in the first Baskerville Shield test. In 2016, Hodgson was named in the 24-man England team that will play in the 2016 Four Nations. Before the tournament began, he featured in a test match against France.

In 2017, Hodgson was included in England's World Cup squad, helping his team reach the final against Australia, but did not play in the final itself after suffering a serious knee injury in the semi-final victory over Tonga.

In 2018 he was selected for England against France at the Leigh Sports Village.

He was selected in squad for the 2019 Great Britain Lions tour of the Southern Hemisphere. He made his Great Britain test debut in the defeat by Tonga.

== Post playing ==
On 26 July 2024 it was announced that Hodgson would take over the coaching role of the Parramatta Eels' Harold Matthews Cup squad in 2025.
