= James Roby =

English Rugby League legend

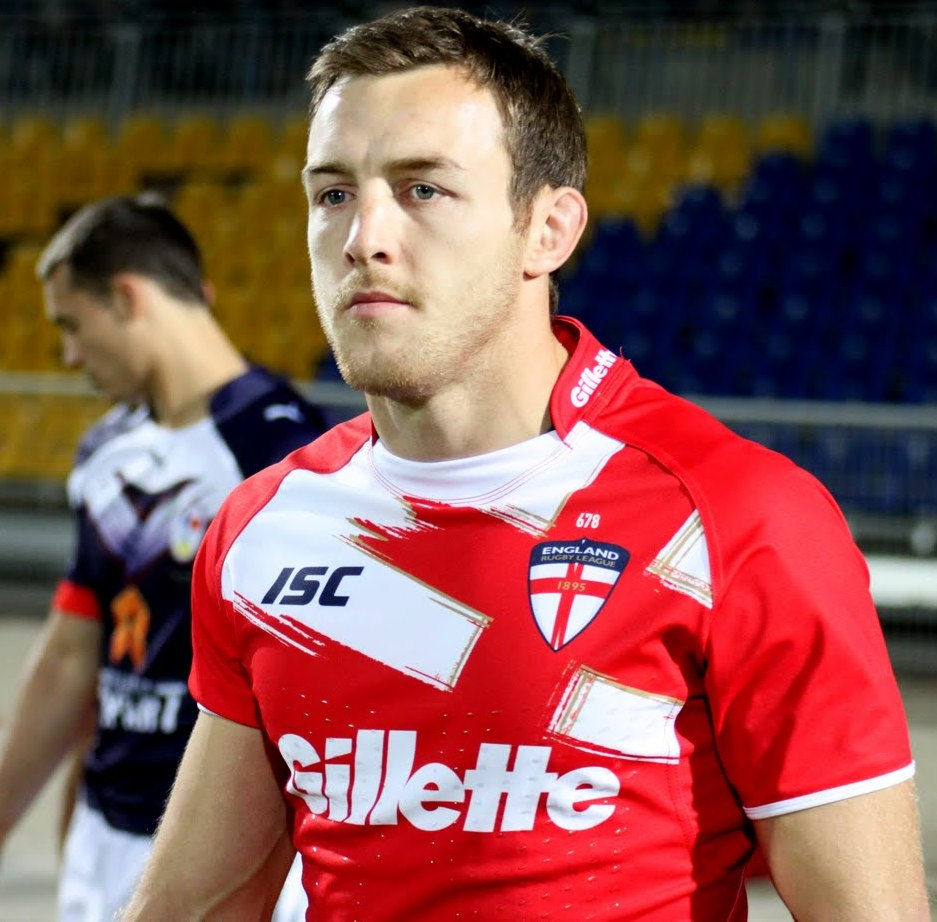

Personal information
- Full name: James William Mark Roby
- Born: 22 November 1985 (age 40) Whiston, Merseyside, England

Playing information
- Height: 5 ft 11 in (1.80 m)
- Weight: 13 st 12 lb (88 kg)
- Position: Hooker
Club
Years	Team	Pld	T	G	FG	P
2004–23	St Helens	551	117	1	1	471
Representative
Years	Team	Pld	T	G	FG	P
2006–07	Great Britain	7	1	0	0	4
2008–18	England	32	6	0	0	24

James William Mark Roby (born 22 November 1985) is an English former professional rugby league footballer who last played as a hooker for St Helens, who he also captained, in the Super League. He represented Great Britain and England at international level.

Roby played his entire professional career at St Helens, winning Super League Championships with them six times (in 2006, 2014, 2019, 2020, 2021 and 2022), winning the League Leaders Shield eight times (in 2005, 2006, 2007, 2008, 2014, 2018, 2019 and 2022) and winning the Challenge Cup four times (in 2006, 2007, 2008 and 2021). Individually, he has been named to the Super League Dream Team on seven occasions, won the Harry Sunderland Trophy twice, and was awarded the 2007 Man of Steel. Roby has also won the World Club Challenge twice in 2007 and 2023 respectively. Roby currently holds the record for the most appearances in the Super League era.

== Background ==
Roby was born in Whiston, Merseyside, England. He went to Legh Vale Primary School, Haydock and later attended Cowley Language College from 1997 to 2002 then went on to study at the Sixth Form. Furthermore, James went on to Liverpool John Moores University studying sports science but dropped out in his first year to concentrate on his rugby. He played junior rugby league for Blackbrook.

== Club career ==
=== 2000s ===
Roby made his début in 2004 against Widnes after progressing through the academy ranks at St Helens. Roby's position is hooker and had plenty of experience already, playing alongside some of the greats of the game including Keiron Cunningham.

In 2005's Super League X, he was narrowly beaten to the Young Player of The Year. St Helens saw Roby as one of the brighter prospects and he seemed a perfect replacement for Keiron Cunningham when he retired, so much so that St Helens were willing to allow Mickey Higham to leave the club and Roby was given a more active role in the team.

Roby played for St Helens from the interchange bench in their 2006 Challenge Cup Final victory against Huddersfield. St Helens reached the 2006 Super League Grand final to be contested against Hull FC, and Roby played from the interchange bench in Saints' 26–4 victory.

As 2006 Super League champions, St Helens faced 2006 NRL Premiers the Brisbane Broncos in the 2007 World Club Challenge. Roby played at hooker in the Saints' 18–14 victory.

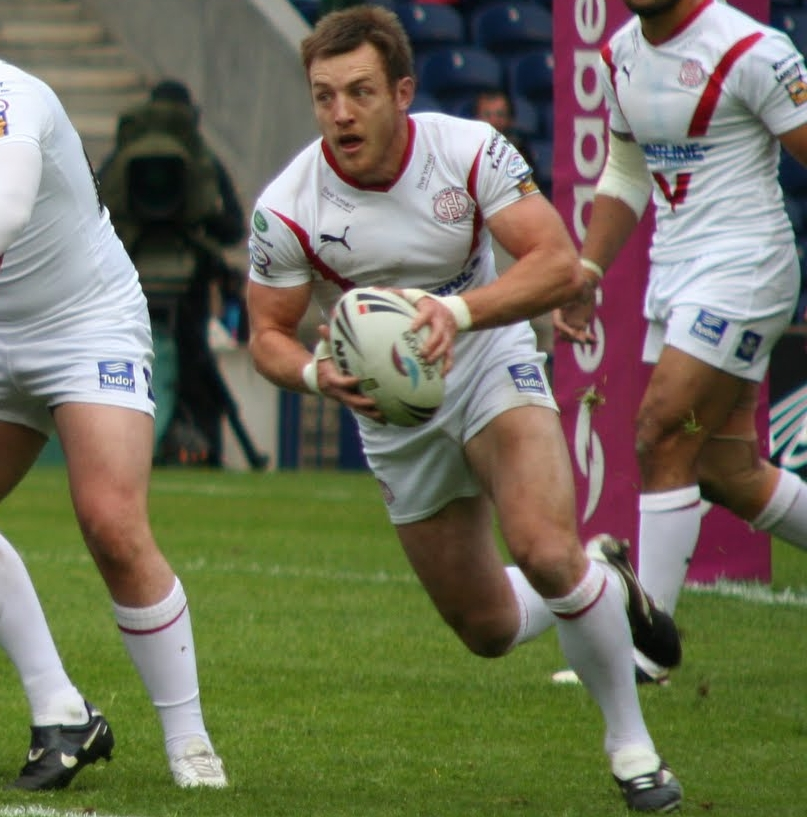
Roby playing for St Helens in 2010

Roby holds the honour of scoring the first try at the new Wembley Stadium, scored during St Helens' victory over the Catalans Dragons in the Challenge Cup Final on 25 August 2007. Roby also won the 'Man of Steel' award in October 2007 after being judged to have had the most impact on 2008's Super League XIII season, being the youngest player to ever win the award, and also becoming the third St Helens player in a row to win the accolade from 2005 to 2007, with Jamie Lyon (2005) and Paul Wellens (2006) winning the award previously.

He played in the 2008's Super League XIII Grand Final defeat by Leeds.

He played in the 2009 Super League Grand Final defeat by the Leeds Rhinos at Old Trafford.

=== 2010s ===
He played in the 2011 Super League Grand Final defeat by the Leeds Rhinos at Old Trafford.

Despite being linked with moves to the NRL, Roby committed his long-term future to St Helens in 2013 by signing a five-year contract with the club.

St Helens reached the 2014 Super League Grand Final, and Roby was selected to play at hooker, putting in a Man-of-the-Match performance to claim the Harry Sunderland Trophy in their 14–6 victory over Wigan at Old Trafford.

On 23 January 2018, Roby was appointed captain for 2018. The 32-year-old took over the role from back rower Jon Wilkin.

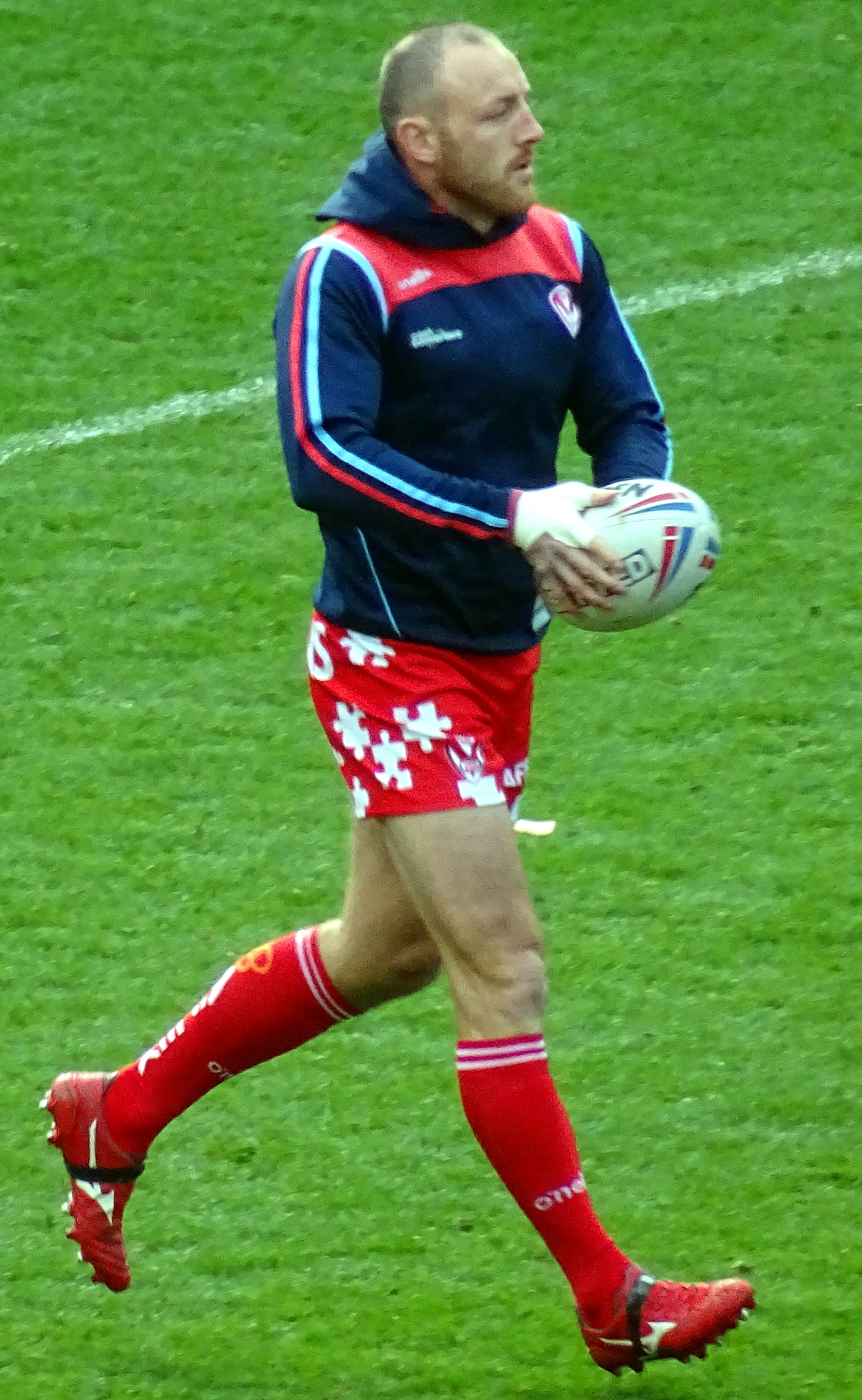
Roby warming up for St Helens at Anfield in 2019

He played in the 2019 Challenge Cup Final defeat by the Warrington Wolves at Wembley Stadium.

He played in the 2019 Super League Grand Final victory over Salford at Old Trafford.

=== 2020s ===
In August 2020, Roby made his 500th career appearance in a 10–0 victory against Castleford Tigers. Roby played in St Helens 8–4 2020 Super League Grand Final victory over Wigan at the Kingston Communications Stadium in Hull. Roby also won the Harry Sunderland Trophy as man of the match.

On 17 July 2021, he played for St. Helens in their 26–12 2021 Challenge Cup Final victory over Castleford, scoring a second half try. On 9 October 2021, Roby played in his tenth grand final for St. Helens which was the club's 2021 Super League Grand Final victory over Catalans Dragons. It was St. Helens third successive championship victory in a row.

In round 7 of the 2022 Super League Season, Roby made his 500th appearance for St Helens in their 26–0 victory over Leeds.

In round 15 of the 2022 Super League season, Roby broke the Super League appearance record with his 455th match in the competition. Roby went on to score a try in the Saints 26–18 victory over Hull KR.

On 24 September 2022, Roby captained St Helens to a fourth successive Super League title as they defeated Leeds 24–12 in the grand final.

On 18 February 2023, Roby captained St Helens to a one-point win over Penrith in the World Club Challenge at BlueBet Stadium in Penrith. St Helens were considered large outsiders prior to the match. On 13 May 2023, Roby broke the all-time St Helens appearance record with his 532nd match for the club against Salford. St Helens beat Salford 26-12. Roby played 27 games for St Helens in the 2023 Super League season as the club finished third on the table. Roby played in St Helens narrow loss against the Catalans Dragons in the semi-final which stopped them reaching a fifth successive grand final. This would be Roby's final game as a player.

== International career ==
=== Great Britain ===
Roby made his international début for Great Britain the 2006 Tri Nations during the tour against Australia and New Zealand.

=== England ===
Roby was selected for the England squad to compete in the 2008 World Cup in Australia.

Roby warming up for England in 2008

Group A's first match against Papua New Guinea he played at hooker, and was named the man-of-the-match in England's victory.

Roby returned to international rugby league when he was selected to play for England against France in the one-off test. In 2011, Roby played in the 2011 Rugby League Four Nations and was part of the team that lost the final to Australia.

In 2013 Roby was named in England 2013 World Cup squad but lost in the semi-final in the dying seconds to New Zealand.

After missing out on the 2014 Four Nations, Roby was selected in Englands 24-man squad to take on New Zealand in an end-of-year test-series. In a warmup game before the first test against the Kiwis, England took on France in a test match. Roby scored two of England's 15 tries in their romp over their opponents and went on to beat the Kiwis 2–1.

In October 2017 he was selected in the England squad for the 2017 Rugby League World Cup. In June 2018 he played against the Kiwis at Empower Field at Mile High in Denver, Colorado. On 22 September 2021, Roby retired from international duty.
