= Luke Thompson (rugby league) =

Great Britain and England international rugby league footballer

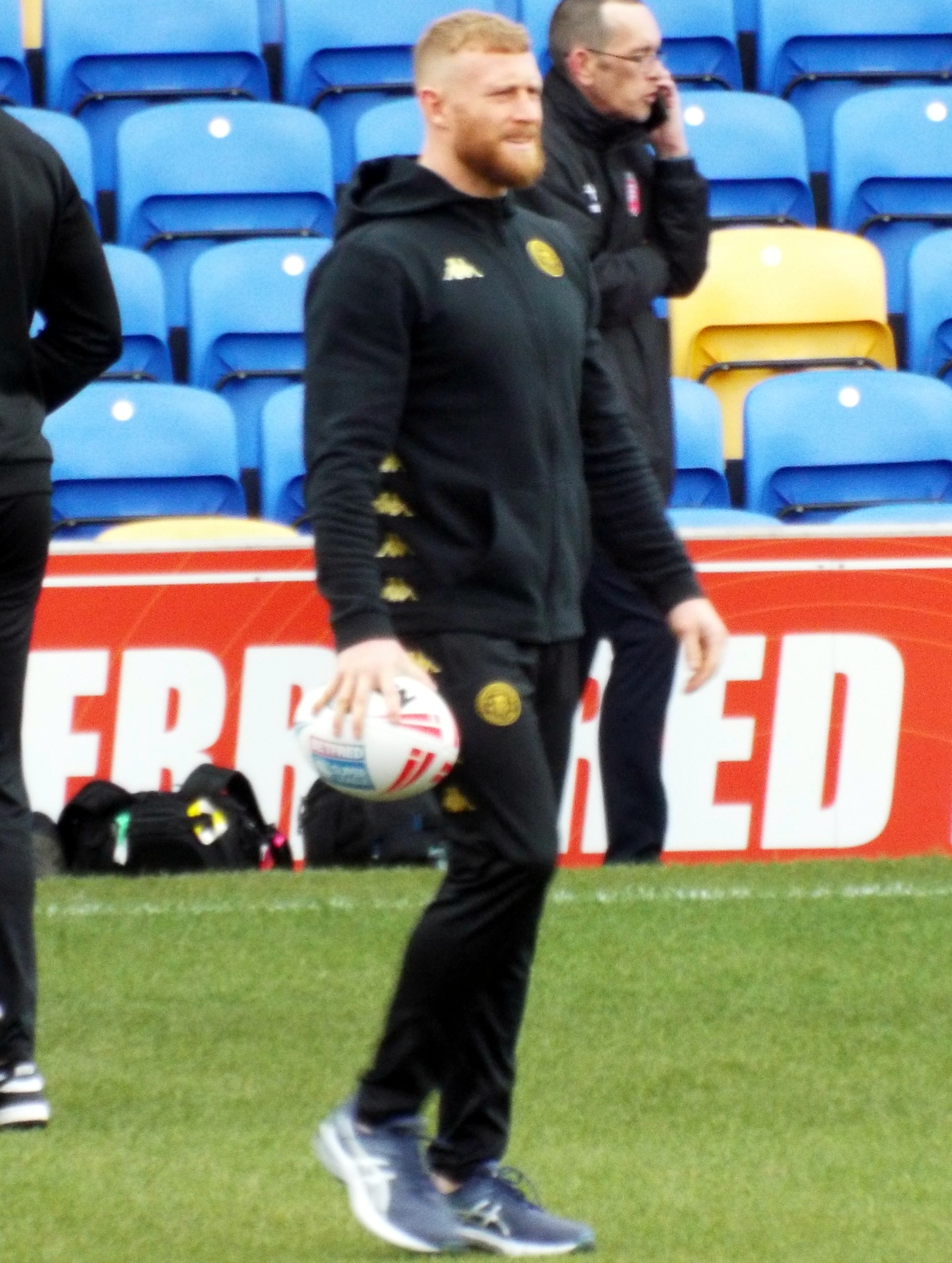

Personal information
- Born: 27 April 1995 (age 31) Higher End, Billinge, Greater Manchester, England
- Height: 6 ft 0 in (1.84 m)
- Weight: 16 st 5 lb (104 kg)

Playing information
- Position: Prop, Loose forward
Club
Years	Team	Pld	T	G	FG	P
2013–20	St Helens	164	29	0	0	116
2015(loan)	→ Rochdale Hornets	1	0	0	0	0
2020–23	Canterbury Bulldogs	42	3	0	0	12
2024–	Wigan Warriors	81	4	0	0	16
	Total	288	36	0	0	144
Representative
Years	Team	Pld	T	G	FG	P
2018–	England	12	2	0	0	8
2019	Great Britain	3	0	0	0	0
- Source: As of 6 November 2026

Luke Thompson (born 27 April 1995) is an English professional rugby league footballer who plays as prop and loose forward for the Wigan Warriors in the Super League, and for England and Great Britain at international level.

He has played his most of his professional career to date for St Helens, with whom he won the 2014 Super League Grand Final. He has also spent time on loan from Saints at the Rochdale Hornets in the Championship 1.

== Background ==
Thompson was born in Wigan, Greater Manchester, England.

== Career ==
=== St Helens ===
Thompson had been at St Helens since he was 11 (signing from Bold Miners).

==== 2013 ====
Thompson made his Super League debut during the 2013 season in the Saints' 21-14 round 9 loss against the London Broncos. On 27 September, Thompson's contract was extended by 2 years. Thompson played 7 games for St Helens and scored 3 tries.

==== 2014 ====
In Round 21 of the 2014 Super League season, Thompson scored a try in the Saints' 58-16 win over the London Broncos. St Helens reached the 2014 Super League Grand Final and Thompson was selected to play from the interchange bench in their 14-6 victory over the Wigan Warriors at Old Trafford. Thompson played 17 games for St Helens and scored a try.

==== 2015 ====
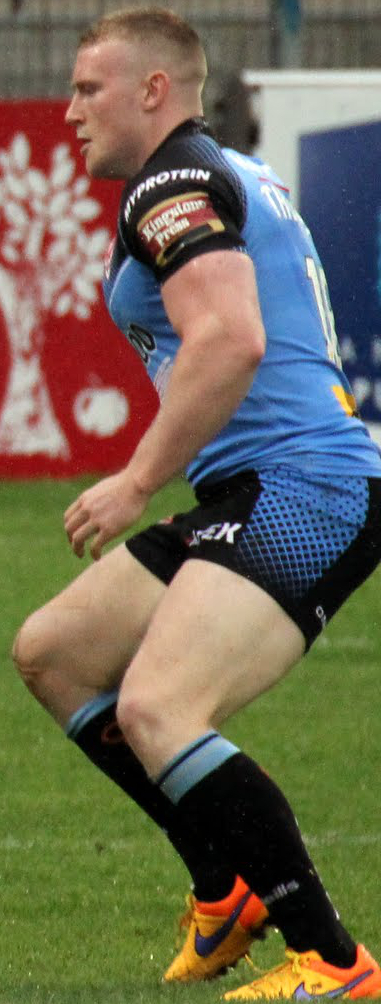
Thompson playing for St Helens in 2015

Thompson played 20 games for St Helens during the 2015 Super League season, including their Super 8s campaign.

==== 2016 ====
Thompson continued playing with St Helens during the 2016 Super League season, including their 10-18 semi-final loss to Warrington Wolves. He finished the year playing 23 games and scoring 2 tries.

==== 2017 ====
Thompson played in St Helens' 22-23 semi-final loss to Castleford Tigers. He finished the year with 27 games and 2 tries.

==== 2018 ====
In 2018, Thompson had one of his best years yet, playing 32 games and scoring 6 tries. He played in St Helens' 13-18 loss to Warrington.

==== 2019 ====
He played in the 2019 Challenge Cup Final defeat to the Warrington Wolves at Wembley Stadium. He played in the 2019 Super League Grand Final victory over the Salford Red Devils at Old Trafford.

=== Canterbury-Bankstown ===
==== 2020 ====
On 4 February, it was announced Thompson had signed a three-year deal with Canterbury-Bankstown Bulldogs in the National Rugby League (NRL). Thompson made the move to Australia in June. He completed two weeks of isolation on his arrival in Australia before his first game for the Canterbury-Bankstown club.

Thompson made his debut for the Bulldogs against the Brisbane Broncos in round 9 of the 2020 NRL season. In round 20 of the 2020 NRL season, Thompson was placed on report for reportedly eye gouging one of the Penrith players during Canterbury's 42-0 loss. Thompson was later suspended for four matches after being found guilty. Thompson made 10 appearances for Canterbury in the 2020 NRL season as the club narrowly avoided the wooden spoon finishing 15th on the table.

==== 2021 ====
In round 5 of the 2021 NRL season, Thompson scored his first try for Canterbury in a 52-18 loss against Melbourne. This try ended Canterbury's scoreless streak of over 240 minutes of play, as they had failed to score in their previous three games.

In round 19 of the 2021 NRL season, Thompson scored another try but was subsequently sent to the sin bin during Canterbury's 44-24 loss to Cronulla-Sutherland. As a result of the sin binning incident, Thompson received a three-match ban on 27 July 2021.

Throughout the 2021 NRL season Thompson made a total of 15 appearances for Canterbury. However, the club finished last in the season and were awarded the Wooden Spoon.

==== 2022 ====
Thompson played a total of 13 matches for Canterbury in the 2022 NRL season as the club finished 12th on the table.

==== 2023 ====
On the 28 February, Thompson injured his ankle at training, and was assisted off the field. Canterbury general manager Phil Gould later revealed that the injury was quite serious, and initial prognosis was minimum 6 months recovery. Thompson made his return on 28 July off the bench in Round 22 of the NSW Cup season, making 10 runs for 103 metres. On 4 October, Thompson signed a four-year deal to join English side Wigan ahead of the 2024 season.

=== Wigan ===
==== 2024 ====
On 8 June, Thompson played in Wigan's 2024 Challenge Cup final victory over Warrington. On 12 October, Thompson played in Wigan's 9-2 2024 Super League grand final victory over Hull Kingston Rovers.

==== 2025 ====
On 9 October, Thompson played in Wigan's 24-6 2025 Super League Grand Final loss against Hull Kingston Rovers.

=== 2026 ===
On 30 May, Thompson played in Wigan's 2026 Challenge Cup final victory against Hull Kingston Rovers.

== International career ==
In 2018 he was selected for England against France at the Leigh Sports Village.

He was selected in squad for the 2019 Great Britain Lions tour of the Southern Hemisphere. He made his Great Britain test debut in the defeat to Tonga.

== Honours ==
=== Wigan Warriors ===
- Super League
  - Winner (1): 2024
- League Leaders' Shield
  - Winner (2): 2024, 2026
- Challenge Cup
  - Winner (2): 2024, 2026

=== Individual ===
- Super League Dream Team
  - Winner: 2024
