= 2019 Challenge Cup final =

Rugby league match in the United Kingdom

2019 Challenge Cup Final
Warrington Wolves	St Helens
18	4
	1	2	Total
WAR	12	6	18
STH	0	4	4
- Date: 24 August 2019
- Stadium: Wembley Stadium, London
- Location: London, United Kingdom
- Lance Todd Trophy: Daryl Clark
- God Save The Queen and Abide with Me: Ricardo Panela
- Referee: Robert Hicks
- Attendance: 62,717

Broadcast partners
- Broadcasters: BBC One

The 2019 Challenge Cup Final was the deciding game of the Rugby Football League's 2019 Challenge Cup competition, the 118th staging of the competition. The match was held at Wembley Stadium in London on 24 August 2019 with kick off at 15:00. The final was contested by the Warrington Wolves and St Helens, the first time the two sides have met in a major final.

== Background ==
The two sides have never met in a Challenge Cup final before. It had been 11 years since St Helens last won in the Challenge Cup Final, and despite final appearances in 2016 and 2018, Warrington have not triumphed since 2012.

Warrington came into the game on the back of five straight defeats in Super League, and with being defeated by the Catalans Dragons in last season's final. On the other hand, the Saints were leading the way at the top of the table, losing just three games all season, two of which came at the London Broncos (one of those games going to golden point extra time), with the other, away to Catalans. They had not lost a home game so far in the season.

== Route to the final ==
=== Warrington Wolves ===
Warrington escaped the sixth round with a narrow 26–24 victory over rivals Wigan. Warrington then faced Hull KR in the quarter finals winning 28 points to 22. Warrington's semi-final opposition was also a Kingston-upon-Hull side, this time Hull F.C., to which they secured their most comfortable win en route to the final.

Round	Opposition	Score
6th	Wigan Warriors (H)	26–24
QF	Hull KR (A)	28–22
SF	Hull F.C. (N)	22–14

=== St Helens ===
St Helens faced Super League side Huddersfield Giants in the sixth round, beating them 22–16. A 48–10 thrashing of Wakefield Trinity in the quarter finals saw the Saints progress to the semis where they faced Championship side Halifax and getting a comfortable victory to progress to the final.

Round	Opposition	Score
6th	Huddersfield Giants (A)	22–16
QF	Wakefield Trinity (H)	48–10
SF	Halifax (N)	26–2

== Match details ==
Saturday, 24 August
3:00pm (BST)

Warrington Wolves	18 – 4	St Helens
Tries: Joe Philbin (26'); Ben Murdoch-Masila (34'); Daryl Clark (72'); Goals: Stefan Ratchford (27', 34') 2/2; Declan Patton (72) 1/1	Report	Tries: Theo Fages (55'); Goals: Lachlan Coote 0/1

Wembley Stadium, London
Attendance: 62,717
Referee: (England) Robert Hicks

=== Teams ===
Warrington Wolves	Position	St Helens
1 Stefan Ratchford	Fullback	23 Lachlan Coote
2 Tom Lineham	Wing	2 Tommy Makinson
3 Bryson Goodwin	Centre	3 Kevin Naiqama
18 Toby King	Centre	4 Mark Percival
5 Josh Charnley	Wing	5 Regan Grace
11 Ben Currie	Stand-off	1 Jonny Lomax
15 Declan Patton	Scrum-half	6 Theo Fages
8 Chris Hill	Prop	8 Alex Walmsley
9 Daryl Clark	Hooker	9 James Roby
10 Mike Cooper	Prop	10 Luke Thompson
13 Ben Murdoch-Masila	Second-row	11 Zeb Taia
12 Jack Hughes	Second-row	17 Dominique Peyroux
14 Jason Clark	Loose forward	15 Morgan Knowles
19 Sitaleki Akauola	interchange	13 Louie McCarthy-Scarsbrook
17 Joe Philbin	interchange	16 Kyle Amor
23 Matt Davis	interchange	20 Jack Ashworth
22 Jake Mamo	interchange	12 Joseph Paulo
Steve Price	Coach	Justin Holbrook
