= Tommy Makinson =

England international rugby league footballer & coach (born 1992)

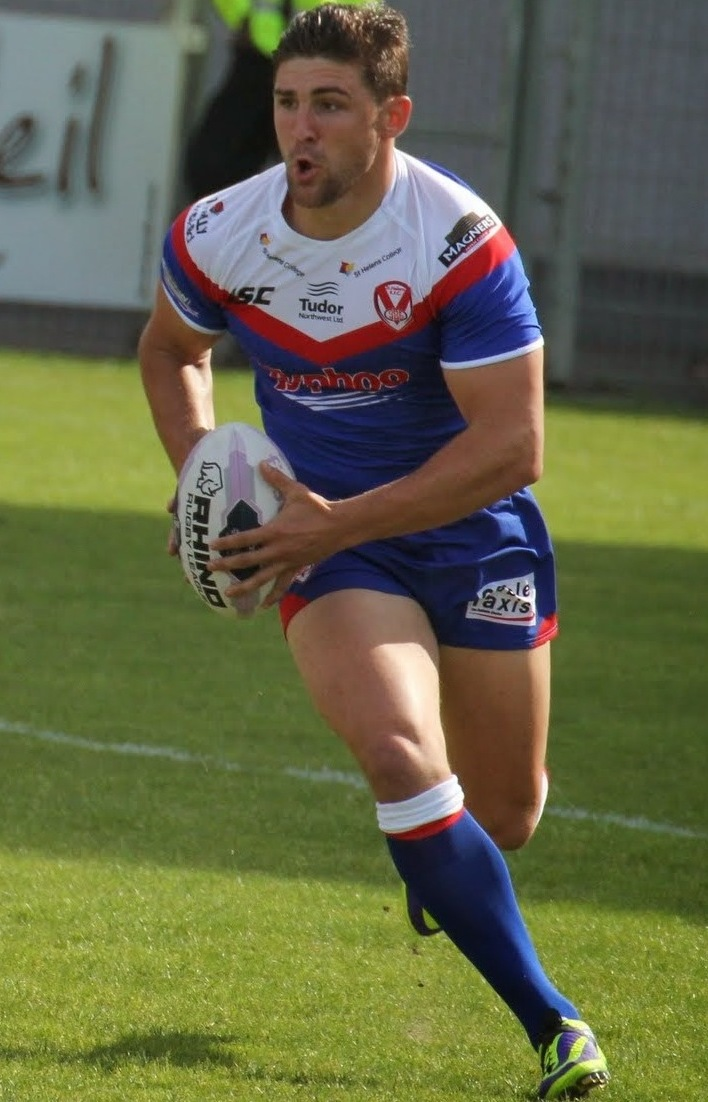

Personal information
- Full name: Thomas Makinson
- Born: 10 October 1991 (age 35) Ince-in-Makerfield, Wigan, Greater Manchester, England
- Height: 6 ft 0 in (1.83 m)
- Weight: 14 st 5 lb (91 kg)

Playing information
- Position: Wing, Fullback
Club
Years	Team	Pld	T	G	FG	P
2011–24	St Helens	348	201	273	1	1412
2013(loan)	→ Rochdale Hornets	1	3	0	0	12
2013(loan)	→ Whitehaven	1	2	0	0	8
2025–26	Catalans Dragons	36	20	10	0	100
	Total	386	226	283	1	1532
Representative
Years	Team	Pld	T	G	FG	P
2018–	England	19	13	20	0	92
- Source: As of 6 November 2026

Tommy Makinson (born 10 October 1991) is an English former professional rugby league footballer who played as a winger for St Helens and the Catalans Dragons in the Super League, and England at international level. He took the role of player/coach of Australian club Coffs Harbour Comets for 2027 on a 2-year deal.

He spent time on loan from St Helens at the Rochdale Hornets in Championship 1 and Whitehaven in the Championship.

Earlier in his career he also played as a fullback and centre. Makinson played most of his Super League career with Saints, with whom he won the 2014, 2019, 2020, 2021 and the 2022 Super League Grand Finals.

== Background ==
Makinson was born in Ince-in-Makerfield, Wigan, Greater Manchester, England.

== Career ==
Makinson signed for the St Helens club from Wigan amateur side Wigan St Judes, after previously playing for Hindley before playing for Halton Hornets. He played in the 2011 Super League Grand Final defeat by the Leeds Rhinos at Old Trafford. St Helens reached the 2014 Super League Grand Final, and Makinson was selected to play on the wing, scoring a try in their 14–6 victory over the Wigan Warriors at Old Trafford.

Makinson played in the 2019 Challenge Cup Final defeat by the Warrington Wolves at Wembley Stadium. He played in the 2019 Super League Grand Final victory over the Salford Red Devils at Old Trafford, slotting a stunning drop goal in the process.

On 16 August 2020, Makinson was charged by the RFL and was given a Grade F "other contrary behaviour", (the most serious grade on the disciplinary panel, which carries a minimum punishment of eight games' suspension) for an alleged low grab on Castleford Tigers Liam Watts, during which the incident was placed on report by referee Liam Moore. He appeared before a disciplinary hearing on 17 August 2020, to find out the length of his suspension. Makinson contested the decision of his grade; the tribunal accepted his challenge, and decided that due to his previous disciplinary record, his Grade was downgraded to a Grade E, and he was given a five-match suspension, and fined £500. He was unavailable for selection until early October.

Makinson played in the club's 8-4 2020 Super League Grand Final victory over Wigan at the Kingston Communications Stadium in Hull; his 80th minute drop-goal attempt rebounded off the goal sticks and led to the winning try. He played for St. Helens in their 2021 Challenge Cup Final victory over Castleford, scoring a try in a 26-12 triumph.

In round 19 of the 2021 Super League season, Makinson was sent off during St Helens' shock 20-10 loss against Castleford. He played for St Helens in their 2021 Super League Grand Final victory over Catalans Dragons; in the second half, he was sent to the sin bin and thus became the first player to be sin-binned in a Super League Grand Final. In round 23 of the 2022 Super League season, Makinson scored two tries and kicked eight goals in St Helens' 60-6 victory over Hull F.C. The following week in round 24, he scored two tries and kicked seven goals in St Helens' 38-12 victory over Hull Kingston Rovers. In the 2022 semi-final, Makinson was sent to the sin bin for a professional foul during St Helens' 19-12 victory over Salford which sent the club into their fourth consecutive grand final. On 24 September 2022, he played for St Helens in their 2022 Super League Grand Final victory over Leeds. On 18 February 2023, Makinson played in St Helens 13-12 upset victory over Penrith in the 2023 World Club Challenge. In round 14 of the 2023 Super League season, Makinson scored four tries and kicked six goals in St Helens 48-6 victory over Huddersfield. In the 2023 Challenge Cup semi-final, Makinson missed two crucial conversions as St Helens lost to Leigh 12-10 including one conversion attempt right at the end of the match which would have sent the game into extra-time. On 13 August 2023, Makinson scored a hat-trick for St Helens in their 32-18 victory over Huddersfield. Makinson played 23 games for St Helens in the 2023 Super League season scoring 23 tries as the club finished third on the table. He played in St Helens narrow loss against the Catalans Dragons in the semi-final which ended St Helens four-year dominance of the competition. In round 11 of the 2024 Super League season, Makinson was sent off in St Helens 60-6 victory over Castleford. On 19 May 2024, Makinson announced he would be departing St Helens at the end of the season after 14 years with the club. On 25 May 2024, Makinson scored his 200th try for St Helens in their 40-10 victory over Leeds.

On 12 June 2024, Makinson signed a two-year deal to join the Catalans Dragons starting in 2025. Makinson played 21 matches for St Helens in the 2024 Super League season scoring 14 tries. His last game for the club was their golden point extra-time elimination playoff loss against Warrington. In round 1 of the 2025 Super League season, Makinson made his club debut for Catalans in their upset loss against Hull F.C. In round 22 of the 2025 Super League season, Makinson scored a hat-trick in Catalans 30-22 loss against Warrington. Makinson played 23 matches for Catalans in the 2025 Super League season which saw the club finish a disappointing 9th on the table.

In August 2026, Makinson announced that he would be retiring at the end of the 2026 Super League season.. He played his final game in the 50-12 defeat to Wigan Warriors on 11 September 2026.

== International career ==
Makinson enjoyed a stellar 2018 season, being included in the Super League Dream Team and playing a starring role in England's 2–1 series victory over New Zealand. This included a hat-trick in the second Test at Anfield. In November 2018 he won the Rugby League World Golden Boot Award over James Tedesco, Dallin Watene-Zelezniak and Elliot Whitehead. On 15 October 2022, Makinson scored one try and kicked ten goals in England's opening game of the 2021 Rugby League World Cup against Samoa. England would win the match 60-6. In the quarter-final of the 2021 Rugby League World Cup, Makinson became the first player to score five tries for England in a game as they won 46-6 against Papua New Guinea.

== Coaching ==
On 13 October 2026 he was announced as the player/coach of Australian Group 2 Rugby League side Coffs Harbour Comets on a 2-year deal
