= Josh Jones (rugby) =

GB international rugby league & rugby union footballer

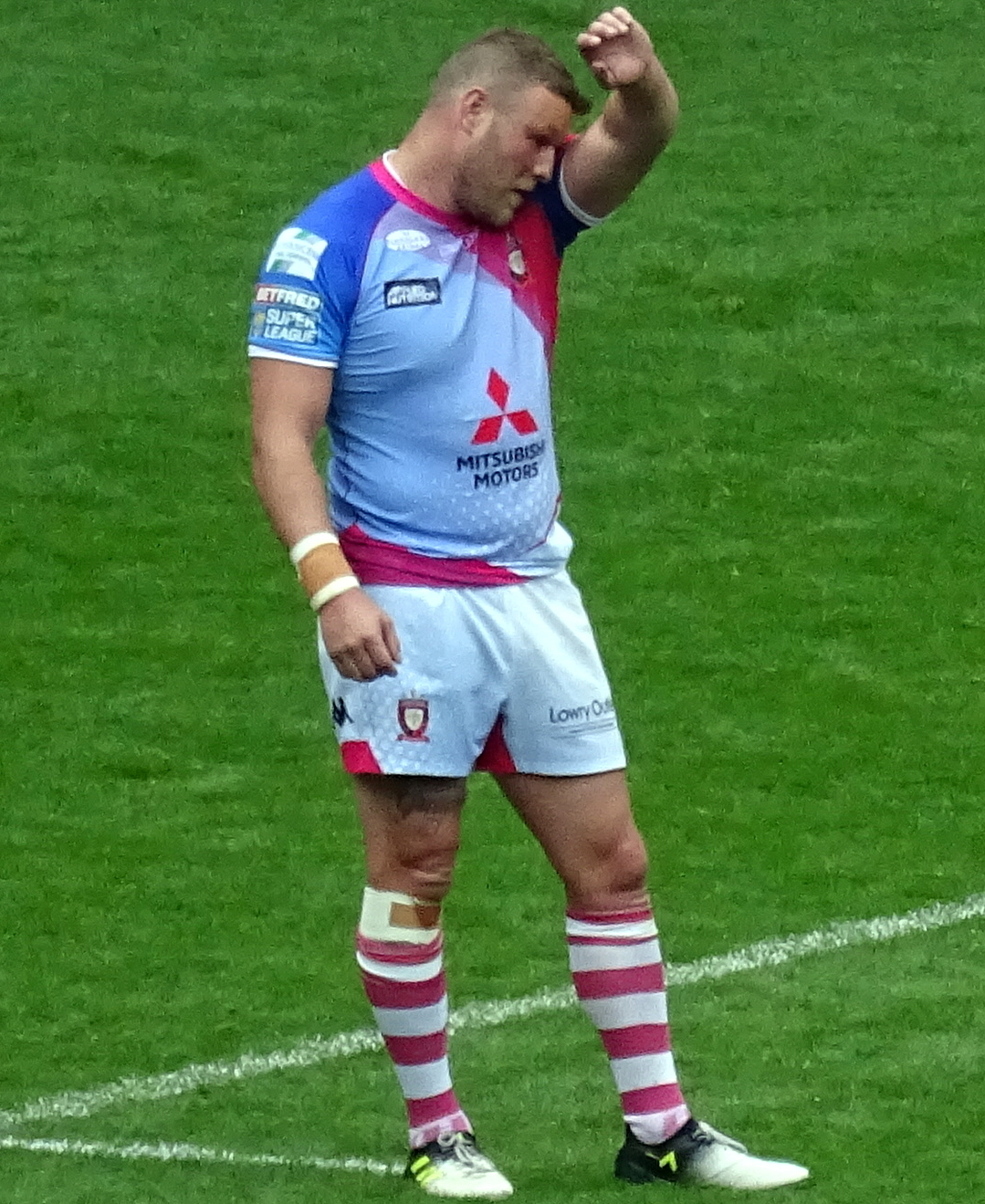

Personal information
- Full name: Joshua Daniel Jones
- Born: 12 May 1993 (age 33) Leyland, Lancashire, England

Playing information
- Height: 6 ft 0 in (1.84 m)
- Weight: 15 st 10 lb (100 kg)

Rugby league
- Position: Second-row, Centre, Loose forward
Club
Years	Team	Pld	T	G	FG	P
2012–15	St Helens	94	25	0	0	100
2014(loan)	→ Rochdale Hornets	2	0	0	0	0
2015(loan)	→ York City Knights	1	1	0	0	4
2016–19	Salford Red Devils	114	19	0	0	76
2020	Hull F.C.	7	0	0	0	0
2021–23	Huddersfield Giants	51	9	0	0	36
	Total	269	54	0	0	216
Representative
Years	Team	Pld	T	G	FG	P
2019	Great Britain	3	0	0	0	0

Rugby union
- Position: Centre
Club
Years	Team	Pld	T	G	FG	P
2015–16	Exeter Chiefs	3	0	0	0	0
2015(loan)	→ Taunton	2	0	0	0	0
	Total	5	0	0	0	0

Joshua Jones (born 12 May 1993) is an English former professional rugby league footballer who played as a centre or second-row forward.

He started his professional career at Super League side St Helens, with whom he won the 2014 Super League Grand Final. He spent time on loan from Saints at Rochdale Hornets and York City Knights. After a brief spell playing rugby union for the Exeter Chiefs in the English Rugby Premiership, and time on loan at Taunton, Jones returned to rugby league with the Salford Red Devils, featuring for the club in the 2019 Super League Grand Final. He then briefly played for Hull before finishing his career at Huddersfield Giants.

Jones represented Great Britain at international level, and was capped three times during the 2019 Lions tour.

== Background ==
Jones was born in Leyland, Lancashire, England.

== Early career ==
Jones signed for St Helens as a 16-year-old in 2009 from Blackbrook Royals, after previously playing for Chorley Panthers and Leyland Warriors. He has international honours from his youth rugby days; playing for England under 16s against France Schoolboys in 2009.

== Playing career ==
=== St Helens ===
In June 2012, Jones signed a three-year contract with St Helens.

St Helens reached the 2014 Super League Grand Final, and Jones was selected to play at centre in their 14-6 victory over the Wigan Warriors at Old Trafford.

=== Exeter Chiefs ===
On 17 June 2015 it was announced that Jones would be switching to rugby union to play for Aviva Premiership club Exeter Chiefs for the 2015-16 season.

=== Salford Red Devils ===
However Jones' spell in rugby union did not last long, citing personal reasons, where he switched back to rugby league for the start of the 2016 Super League season, signing for Salford.

He played in the 2019 Super League Grand Final defeat against St. Helens at Old Trafford.

=== Hull F.C. ===
Jones played for Hull F.C. in the 2020 season.

=== Huddersfield Giants ===
On 24 December 2020 it was announced that Jones would join the Huddersfield Giants for the 2021 season. In round 15 of the 2021 Super League season, he was sent off after the full-time siren for fighting in Huddersfield's 40-26 victory over Hull F.C. On 28 May 2022, he played for Huddersfield in their 2022 Challenge Cup Final loss to Wigan.

Jones was kept sidelined for most of the 2023 season due to concussion-related issues. In September 2023, Jones was released by Huddersfield, and he announced his retirement shortly afterwards.

== International ==
He was selected in squad for the 2019 Great Britain Lions tour of the Southern Hemisphere. He made his Great Britain test debut in the defeat by Tonga.
