= 2019 Super League Grand Final =

St. Helens	Salford Red Devils
23	6
	1	2	Total
STH	12	11	23
SAL	6	0	6
- Date: 12 October 2019
- Stadium: Old Trafford
- Location: Manchester
- Harry Sunderland Trophy: (England) Luke Thompson ( St Helens)
- Headliners: Shed Seven
- Referee: Chris Kendall
- Attendance: 64,102

Broadcast partners
- Broadcasters: Sky Sports
- Commentators: Bill Arthur; Terry O'Connor; Barrie McDermott; Phil Clarke; Stuart Cummings Jenna Brooks

The 2019 Super League Grand Final was the 22nd official grand final and championship-deciding game of Super League XXIV. It was held at Old Trafford in Manchester on 12 October 2019. The final was contested by St. Helens and Salford Red Devils (who were appearing in their first ever grand final).

== Background ==
Pos	Team	Pld	W	D	L	PF	PA	PD	Pts
1	St. Helens	29	26	0	3	916	395	+521	52
3	Salford Red Devils	29	17	0	13	783	597	+186	34

=== Route to the Final ===
==== St Helens ====
St Helens finished 1st in the regular season, to earn a bye to the semi-finals and a home tie against 2nd place Wigan Warriors. Saints dominated the first half by scoring four tries to Wigan's one and led 26–6 at half-time with tries from Theo Fages, Kevin Naiqama, Luke Thompson, and Jonny Lomax.

Wigan knew they had a job to do in the 2nd half, but this was not to be, as Saints Zeb Taia's score and a Mark Percival double extended the lead to send Saints to their first grand final since 2014.

This was also Justin Holbrook's final game for Saints at the Totally Wicked Stadium, without losing a single home game all season. He will leave at the end of the season, as he prepares to take on the vacant coaching role at Gold Coast Titans and will be replaced by Kristian Woolf for the 2020 Season.

Round	Opposition	Score
Semi-final	Wigan Warriors (H)	32-6
Key: (H) = Home venue; (A) = Away venue; (N) = Neutral venue.

==== Salford Red Devils ====
Salford finished 3rd in the regular season, to earn an away tie against 2nd place Wigan Warriors in the qualifying finals, only to lose 18–12.

This meant that Salford would get another chance against Castleford in the Elimination-final, this time there was no mistakes, as they went on to win the match 22–0, thus setting up another tie against Wigan in the preliminary final.

Salford opened the scoring on 2 minutes, as Lee Mossop had the ball stolen, and Krisnan Inu slotted over a penalty goal from 40m out. Wigan were again penalised in the 7th minute, for offside and Inu slotted over another penalty to make it 4–0. The video referee was called into action in the 13th minute, as Gil Dudson went over for the visitors, but referee Ben Thaler couldn't decide whether it was a double movement or not. The try was awarded and Inu added the extras to give Salford a 10–0 lead after 15 minutes.

The visitors extended their lead further in the 45th minute, Joey Lussick crashing over from close range, the try awarded after much deliberation from the video referee. Inu adding another conversion to give Salford an 18–0 lead.

Inu added a fifth penalty goal of the evening in the 65th minute, before the Warriors finally got their first score of the game in the 72nd minute, Oliver Gildart made the initial break, before being captured out by good vision from Sean O’Loughlin, saw the skipper put a kick through for Bevan French, to win the foot race and ease over. Zak Hardaker hit the uprights with the conversion attempt and it was 28–4 to the visitors.

Salford won, and earned them a first ever appearance at the grand final.

Round	Opposition	Score
Qualifying Play-Off	Wigan Warriors (A)	18-12
Elimination Semi-Final	Castleford Tigers (H)	22-0
Preliminary Final	Wigan Warriors (A)	28-4
Key: (H) = Home venue; (A) = Away venue; (N) = Neutral venue.

== Match details ==
12 October 2019

St Helens	23–6	Salford Red Devils
Tries: Knowles 15' Taia 24' Percival 50'; Goals: Coote (5/5) 16', 25', 51', 61' pen, 71' pen Drop Goals: Makinson 79'	Report	Tries: Bibby 32’ Goals: Inu 33’

Old Trafford, Manchester
Attendance: 64,102
Referee: Chris Kendall (Huddersfield)

=== Details ===
St Helens		Position	Salford Red Devils	
23	(Scotland) Lachlan Coote	Fullback	1	(England) Niall Evalds
2	(England) Tommy Makinson	Wing	23	(Australia) Ken Sio
3	(Fiji) Kevin Naiqama	Centre	3	(England) Kris Welham
4	(England) Mark Percival	Centre	5	(England) Jake Bibby
5	(Wales) Regan Grace	Wing	26	(New Zealand) Krisnan Inu
6	(France) Theo Fages	Stand-off	30	(Tonga) Tui Lolohea
1	(England) Jonny Lomax	Scrum-half	31	(Australia) Jackson Hastings
8	(England) Alex Walmsley	Prop	8	(England) Lee Mossop
9	(England) James Roby	Hooker	19	(England) Logan Tomkins
10	(England) Luke Thompson	Prop	10	(Wales) Gil Dudson
11	(Cook Islands) Zeb Taia	Second-row	11	(England) Josh Jones
17	(Cook Islands) Dominique Peyroux	Second-row	12	(England) George Griffin
15	(Wales) Morgan Knowles	Loose forward	17	(Ireland) Tyrone McCarthy
13	(Ireland) Louie McCarthy-Scarsbrook	Interchange	14	(Australia) Joey Lussick
16	(Ireland) Kyle Amor	Interchange	13	(England) Mark Flanagan
20	(England) Jack Ashworth	Interchange	15	(Scotland) Adam Walker
21	(England) Aaron Smith	Interchange	16	(England) Greg Burke
	(Australia) Justin Holbrook	Coach		(England) Ian Watson

St Helens opened the scoring through Morgan Knowles, receiving a short ball from Alex Walmsley to crash over to the left of the posts. Coote converted to give Saints a 6–0 lead.

The runaway league leaders continued their early dominance, crossing the line again through Zeb Taia following a brilliantly crafted short side scrum play. Coote converted once more to extend the lead to 12–0.

The resilient Salford side hit back just after the half hour mark, Jake Bibby finishing off a clever blind side switch in the corner, converted by Krisnan Inu to reduce the score to 12–6 at Half Time.

Mark Percival then crossed early in the 2nd half, chasing his own delicately weighted kick to score in front of the raucous Stretford End. Coote converted to restore Saints lead to 12 points at 18–6.

Two more Coote penalties extended the scoreline to 22–6 in favour of the Saints, before Tommy Makinson kicked a 40m drop goal to seal a 23–6 win and clinch St Helens their 7th Super League Title.
