= Jackson Hastings =

Great Britain international rugby league footballer

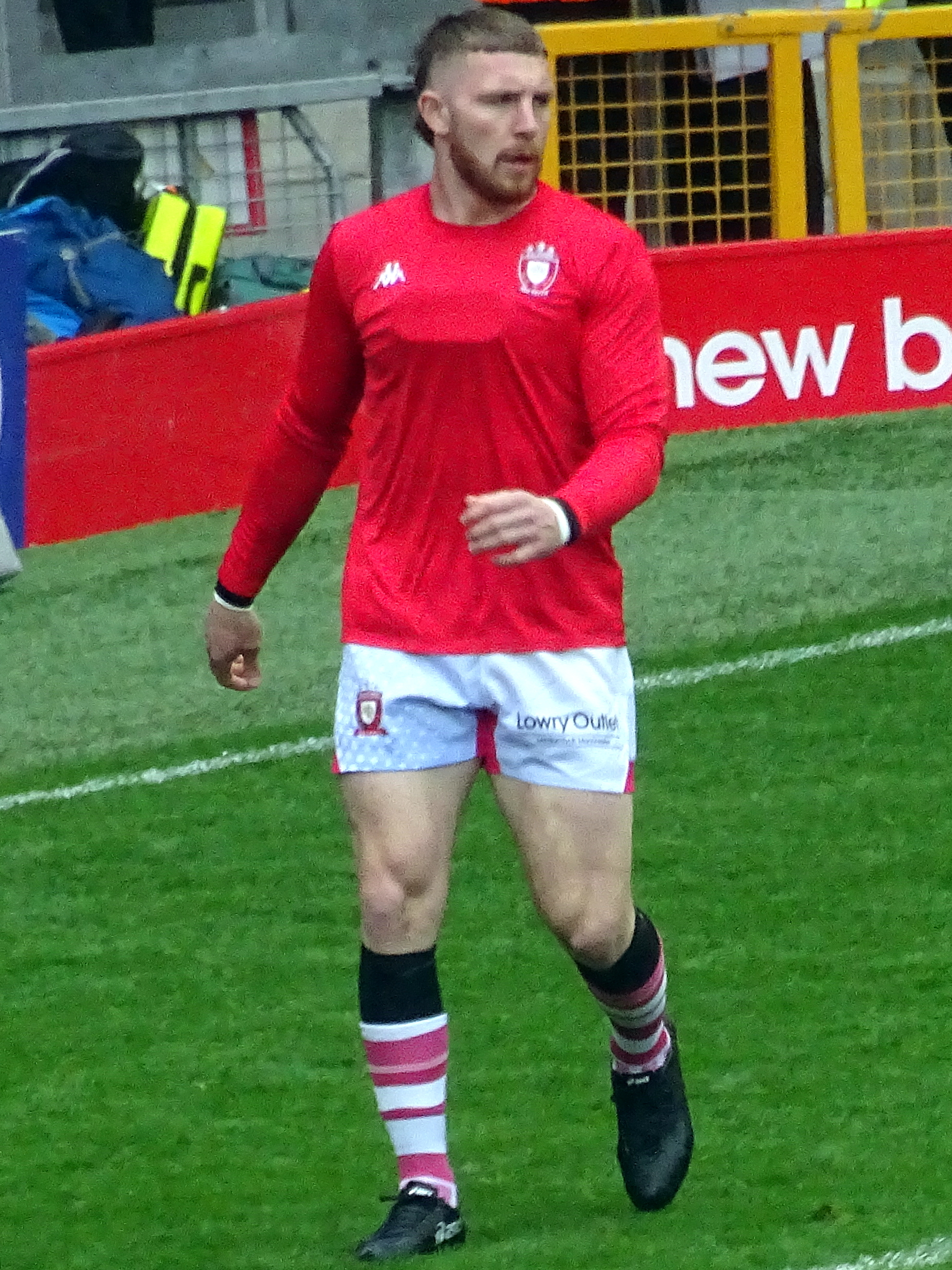

Personal information
- Born: 4 January 1996 (age 30) Wollongong, New South Wales, Australia
- Height: 6 ft 1 in (1.85 m)
- Weight: 14 st 13 lb (95 kg)

Playing information
- Position: Scrum-half, Stand-off, Fullback
Club
Years	Team	Pld	T	G	FG	P
2014–16	Sydney Roosters	34	1	26	1	57
2017–18	Manly Sea Eagles	13	2	3	0	14
2018–19	Salford Red Devils	41	15	15	0	98
2020–21	Wigan Warriors	46	13	1	3	57
2022	Wests Tigers	16	0	10	1	21
2023–25	Newcastle Knights	43	7	36	0	100
2026	St Helens	26	4	93	0	202
	Total	219	42	184	5	549
Representative
Years	Team	Pld	T	G	FG	P
2019	Great Britain	4	0	0	0	0
2021	Combined Nations All Stars	1	0	0	0	0
- Source: As of 22 November 2026
- Father: Kevin Hastings

Jackson Hastings (born 4 January 1996) is a Great Britain international rugby league footballer who plays as a scrum-half or stand-off, most recently for St Helens in the Super League.

He previously played for the Manly Warringah Sea Eagles, Sydney Roosters and the Wests Tigers in the NRL, and the Salford Red Devils and the Wigan Warriors in the Super League and finally Newcastle Knights.

On 6 October 2019, he was crowned Man of Steel.

== Background ==
Hastings was born in Wollongong, New South Wales, Australia, and is of English descent through his grandmother.

He played his junior football for the Western Suburbs Red Devils before being signed by the St. George Illawarra Dragons.

== Playing career ==
=== Early career ===
In 2012 and 2013, Hastings played for the New South Wales Under 16s and Under 18s teams respectively.

In 2013, Hastings played for the St. George Illawarra Dragons' NYC team, and was selected for the Australian Schoolboys.

Hastings played 47 games, scored 14 tries, kicked 195 goals and 1 field goal for 447 points in his U20s career from 2013 to 2016 with both the St. George Illawarra Dragons and the Sydney Roosters.

=== Sydney Roosters ===
On 27 August 2013, Hastings signed with the Sydney Roosters on a 3-year contract, rejecting offers from St. George Illawarra, North Queensland Cowboys and Newcastle Knights. He played for the Roosters' NYC team in 2014.

In round 26 of the 2014 NRL season, Hastings made his NRL debut for the Sydney Roosters against the South Sydney Rabbitohs. The following week, Hastings played in the club's upset qualifying loss to Penrith.

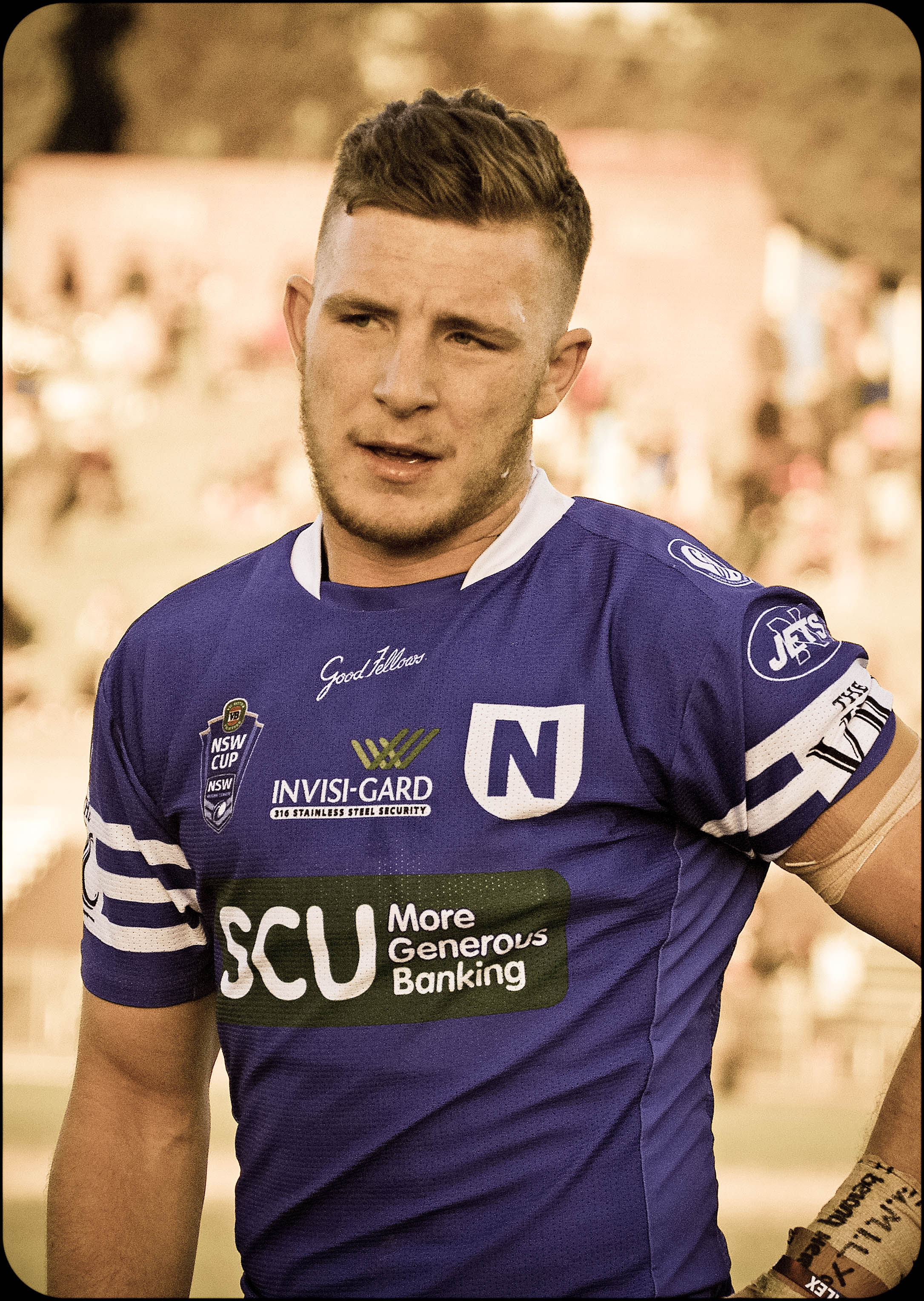
Hastings playing for the Newtown Jets in 2014

On 2 May 2015, Hastings played for the Junior Kangaroos against Junior Kiwis. On 8 July 2015, Hastings played for the New South Wales Under-20s team against the Queensland Under-20s team. In 2015, Hastings was a regular in the Sydney Roosters team as they won the Minor Premiership. Hastings played in the club's preliminary final loss to Brisbane. In 2016, Hastings had an indifferent year at the club as they struggled on the field. This culminated as Hastings was demoted to reserve grade with the Wyong Roos after he had disciplinary problems and also falling out with senior players at the club. In November 2016, Hastings was released from the final year of his contract.

=== Manly-Warringah Sea Eagles ===
In December 2016, Hastings signed a two-year contract with the Manly Warringah Sea Eagles starting in 2017. Hastings made his Debut for the Manly Warringah Sea Eagles in Round 3 of the 2017 NRL season against the North Queensland Cowboys coming off the bench and filling in at Fullback and Scoring a try as the Manly Warringah Sea Eagles defeated the North Queensland Cowboys 30-8.

At the start of the 2018 season, Hastings was involved in a well-publicised falling-out with fellow Manly player Daly Cherry-Evans and coach Trent Barrett. He was banished to reserve grade to play for Blacktown Workers and told he would be moved on by the club.

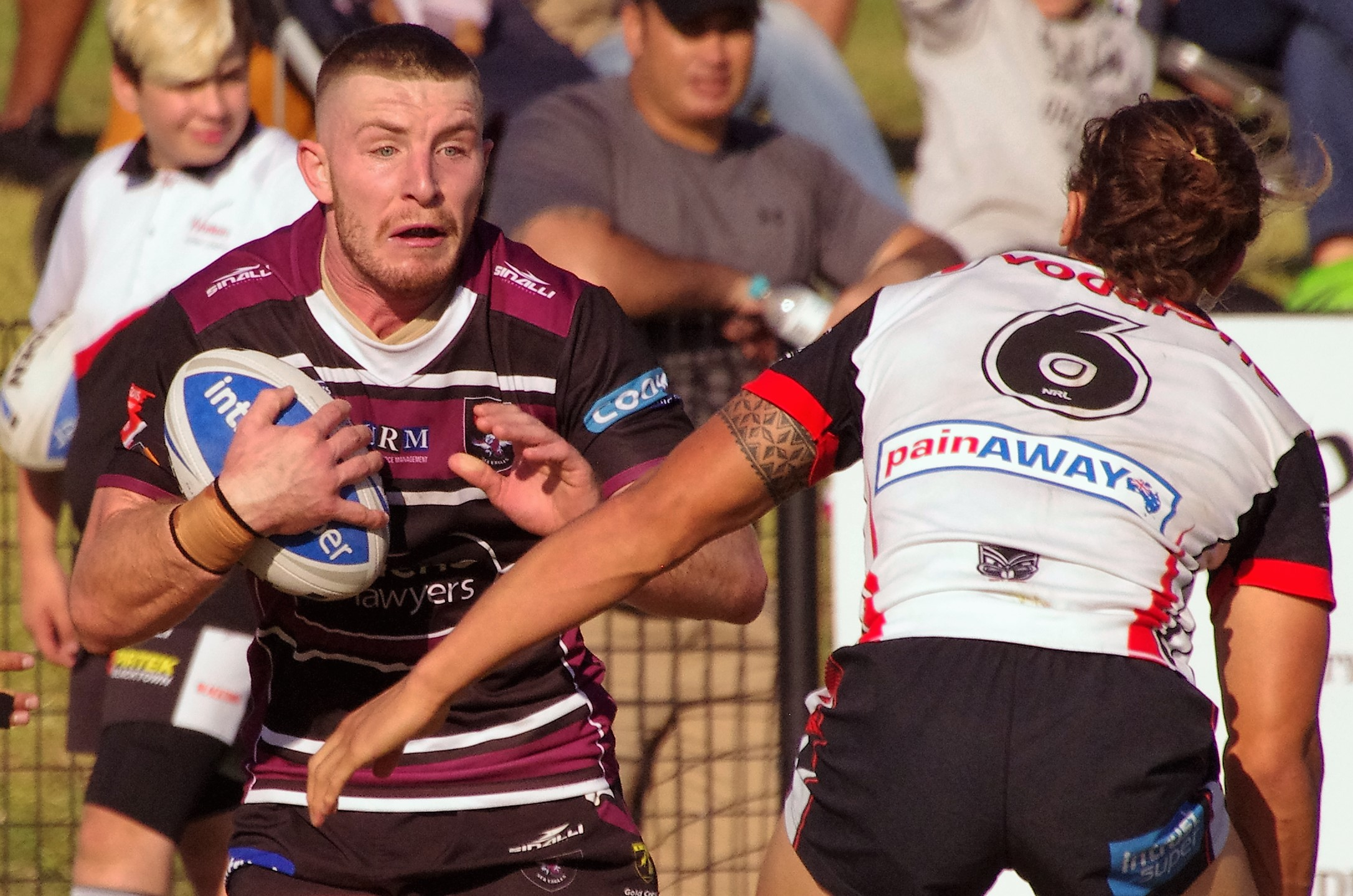
Hastings playing for the Blacktown Workers in 2018

On 26 June 2018, Hastings was released from the remainder of his contract with Manly. The club released a statement saying "Manly Warringah Sea Eagles have today released Jackson Hastings from the remainder of his contract, effective immediately, The Club and Jackson's management have made the decision mutually".

=== Salford Red Devils ===
On 12 July 2018, Hastings signed a two-year deal to join British side the Salford Red Devils.

On 8 July 2019, Hastings was announced to have signed a 2-year deal with Super League side Wigan, effective from the start of the 2020 season.

On 6 October 2019, Hastings won the Man of Steel award after being voted as the Super League's best player during the Super League XXIV season. Hastings was part of the Salford side which reached the 2019 Super League Grand Final but were defeated 23-6 by St Helens at Old Trafford. Salford were looking to win their first championship since 1976.

=== Wigan Warriors ===
Hastings joined Wigan ahead of the 2020 Super League season.

Hastings played in the 2020 Super League Grand Final which Wigan lost 8-4 against St Helens.

On 19 April 2021 Hastings signed a two-year deal to join NRL side the Wests Tigers starting in 2022.

In round 7 of the 2021 Super League season against Salford, Hastings kicked a field goal to win the match for Wigan 17-16.

=== Wests Tigers ===
Wests Tigers signed Hastings on a two-year deal worth about $500,000 a season with a possible upgrade next year. In round 1 of the 2022 NRL season, Hastings made his club debut for the Wests Tigers in their 26-16 loss against Melbourne.

In round 6, Hastings helped the Wests Tigers to their first win of the 2022 season, kicking a 38 metre field goal to break a 20-all deadlock against Parramatta with seconds left remaining in the match. On 31 July 2022, Hastings was ruled out for the remainder of the 2022 NRL season after suffering a broken ankle in Wests Tigers upset victory over Brisbane. Despite his 16 appearances, he was still second in the NRL in the "line engaged" stat. The Wests Tigers club would finish the 2022 NRL season on the bottom of the table and claim the Wooden Spoon for the first time.

=== Newcastle Knights ===
In November 2022, Hastings was released from the final year of his Wests Tigers contract and signed a three-year deal with the Newcastle Knights.

In round 1 of the 2023 NRL season, Hastings made his club debut for Newcastle in their 20–12 loss against the New Zealand Warriors. In round 18 of the 2023 NRL season, Hastings scored two tries in Newcastle's 66-0 victory over Canterbury. Hastings made 22 appearances for Newcastle in the 2023 NRL season as the club finished 5th on the table. Hastings played in the club's elimination final victory over Canberra but missed the following week against the New Zealand Warriors in which Newcastle's season was ended.

After Newcastle lost the opening two matches of the 2024 NRL season, Hastings was demoted to reserve grade and replaced with Jack Cogger. It was reported that Hastings refused to train with the reserve grade team after being demoted. On 1 April 2024, Fox Sports commentator Andrew Voss was forced to apologise over a comment he made about Hastings during Newcastle's round 4 match against the New Zealand Warriors. The camera was panning to some of the NSW Cup players from Newcastle who were watching the first grade team play when Voss commented that one of the players was Hastings who appeared to be sleeping on the hill. Hastings took to his twitter account posting "Unsure who is commenting our game but to make a false statement about me sleeping on the hill when I am in the grandstand watching the game is ridiculous but not surprising to go with multiple lies told over the last few weeks". Voss then replied to Hastings saying “Apology to you Jackson. Certainly wasn’t delivered with any critical intent. Mistake made, Hope we are calling you in the top grade against next week v Dragons". Hastings played 16 matches for Newcastle in the 2024 NRL season as the club finished 8th and qualified for the finals. They were eliminated in the first week of the finals by North Queensland.

Hastings started the 2025 NRL season with Newcastle's reserve grade side after being frozen out of the first team squad by head coach Adam O'Brien. After spending the first 14 weeks in reserve grade, Hastings was called into the Newcastle side for their round 15 match against the Sydney Roosters. Hastings managed to only make five appearances for Newcastle in the 2025 NRL season, which saw the club finish last and claim the Wooden Spoon.

=== St Helens R.F.C. ===
On 20 November 2025 it was reported that he had signed for St Helens RFC in the Super League on a one-year deal. On 7 February 2026, Hastings made his club debut for St Helens in their 98-2 victory over Workington Town in the third round of the Challenge Cup. In round 17 of the 2026 Super League season, Hastings missed a late conversion attempt against arch-rivals Wigan which would have taken the match into extra-time with Wigan holding on to win 16-14. In round 24, Hastings was given a straight red card after striking Castleford's Tyler Dupree during St Helens 36-12 victory. On 24 August, Hastings was suspended for three matches over the incident for violent conduct. On 11 September 2026, Hastings was released by St Helens after not being offered a new contract. Hastings played 26 matches for the club as they missed the playoffs for the first time since the competition was rebranded as the Super League in 1996 and the first time had missed the playoffs in the top division of English rugby league since 1962.

== Representative career ==
He was selected in squad for the 2019 Great Britain Lions tour of the Southern Hemisphere. He made his Great Britain test début in the defeat by Tonga.

On 25 June 2021 he played for the Combined Nations All Stars in their 26-24 victory over England, staged at the Halliwell Jones Stadium, Warrington, as part of England's 2021 Rugby League World Cup preparation.

== Statistics ==
Year	Club	Games	Tries	Goals	FGs	Pts
2014	Sydney Roosters	2				
2015	Sydney Roosters	17	1			4
2016	Sydney Roosters	15		26	1	53
2017	Manly Warringah Sea Eagles	9	1	3		10
2018	Manly Warringah Sea Eagles	4	1			4
2018	Salford Red Devils	6	5	11		42
2019	Salford Red Devils	35	10	4		56
2020	Wigan Warriors	21	9		1	37
2021	Wigan Warriors	25	4	1	2	20
2022	Wests Tigers	16		10	1	11
2023	Newcastle Knights	22	4	16		48
2024	Newcastle Knights	16	3	19		50
2025	Newcastle Knights					
	Totals	189	38	91	5	347

== Personal life ==
Hastings is the son of Megan Harrod and former Sydney Roosters player Kevin Hastings.

== Honours ==
=== Salford Red Devils ===
- Super League
  - Runners-up (1): 2019

=== Wigan Warriors ===
- League Leaders' Shield
  - Winners (1): 2020

=== Individual ===
- Man of Steel:
  - Winners (1): 2019
- Wigan Warriors Player of the Year
  - Winners (1): 2021
