= 2021 Challenge Cup final =

Rugby league match in the United Kingdom

2021 Challenge Cup Final
Castleford Tigers	St Helens
12	26
	1	2	Total
CAS	12	0	12
STH	6	20	26
- Date: 17 July 2021
- Stadium: Wembley Stadium, London
- Location: London, United Kingdom
- Lance Todd Trophy: Niall Evalds
- God Save The Queen and Abide with Me: Sabrina Washington
- Referee: Liam Moore
- Attendance: 40,000 (Note: Restricted attendance due to the COVID-19 pandemic.)

Broadcast partners
- Broadcasters: BBC One

The 2021 Challenge Cup Final was the 120th final of the Rugby Football League's Challenge Cup knock-out competition. It took place on 17 July 2021 at Wembley Stadium between the Castleford Tigers and St Helens.

== Background ==
The 2021 Challenge Cup Final was the first time St Helens and the Castleford Tigers have played each other in the Challenge Cup Final. St Helens are the competition's third most successful side having won the competition 12 times previously, with their last victory coming at their last final appearance in 2008. The Castleford Tigers have reached the final more recently in 2014 where they were beat 23–10 by the Leeds Rhinos. They last won the competition in 1986, winning the competition for the fourth time.

Owing to the COVID-19 pandemic in the United Kingdom, the Challenge Cup this year only included the Super League, RFL Championship and RFL League 1 clubs and did not include any amateur clubs or British forces teams.

== Route to the final ==
=== Castleford Tigers ===
As a Super League side, the Castleford Tigers entered the competition in the third round. For the 2021 competition, the third round is the equivalent of the competition's usual sixth round due to the fact that the first three rounds of the competition were removed as non-professional sides were not allowed to compete due to the COVID-19 pandemic. Castleford drew fellow Super League side Hull KR in their opening game where, following a 32–32 scoreline at full time, a drop goal from Gareth O'Brien saw them through to the quarter finals in golden point extra time. The quarter finals saw the Tigers face the Salford Red Devils in a game which again saw the two sides draw at full time. It was again a drop goal from O'Brien in golden point extra time which saw Castleford enter the semi-finals ending the game 19–18. The semi-final draw saw the team play the Warrington Wolves in a game where Tigers led comfortably following the first 15 minutes, seven tries including a hat-trick from Jordan Turner booked Tigers a place at Wembley with a 35–20 final score.

Round	Opposition	Score
Third round (Note: Equivalent of the competition's usual sixth round; the tournament's structure was temporarily altered due to the COVID-19 pandemic.)	Hull KR	33–32 (Note: After golden point extra time)
Quarter-final	Salford Red Devils	19–18
Semi-final	Warrington Wolves	35–20

=== St Helens ===
St Helens' third-round match saw them draw last season's champions Leeds Rhinos; a comfortable 26–18 scoreline helped by a brace from Regan Grace saw Saints enter the quarter finals. A quarter-final tie against their 2006 Final opponents Huddersfield Giants saw another comfortable 23–18 victory and a place in the semi-finals. Saints' semi-finals game against Hull F.C. saw a much more open game with St Helens claiming a more high scoring game of 33–18. The victory came following a shaky start to the match and an early penalty lead for Hull, however following its conversion Saints gained control of the match.

Round	Opposition	Score
Third round	Leeds Rhinos	26–18
Quarter-final	Huddersfield Giants	23–18
Semi-final	Hull F.C.	33–18

== Pre-match ==
=== Officials ===
The refereeing team for the final was announced on 13 July. Liam Moore was appointed the referee, his second final in succession; Chris Kendall was named as video referee; the touch judges, Jack Smith and Tom Grant; and James Child and Neil Horton the reserve referee and touch judge respectively.

=== Ticketing and stadium capacity ===
In March, it was announced by the Rugby Football League (RFL) that they hoped the final would be held with a 50 per cent capacity crowd pending British pandemic lockdown restrictions being eased. First priority for tickets would be given to people who had bought tickets for the 2020 final, which had been held behind closed doors, and had opted to roll them over to 2021. The ticket allocation for the finalists as well as the teams involved in the RFL 1895 Cup Final was due to be released on 7 June but this was delayed by the RFL pending further information from the government relating to stadium capacity limits. On 21 June, it was confirmed that 45,000 spectators could attend the match, which equated to half the stadium's capacity.

== Match details ==
Saturday, 17 July
3:00pm (BST)

Castleford Tigers	12–26	St Helens
Tries: Evalds (16'); Trueman (25'); Goals: O'Brien (18', 26')	report	Tries: Fages (10'); Roby (42'); Makinson (51'); Amor (78'); Goals: Coote (11', 43', 66', 71', 79')

Wembley Stadium, London
Attendance: 40,000
Referee: (England) Liam Moore
Lance Todd Trophy: Niall Evalds
