= Lachlan Coote =

Scotland international rugby league footballer

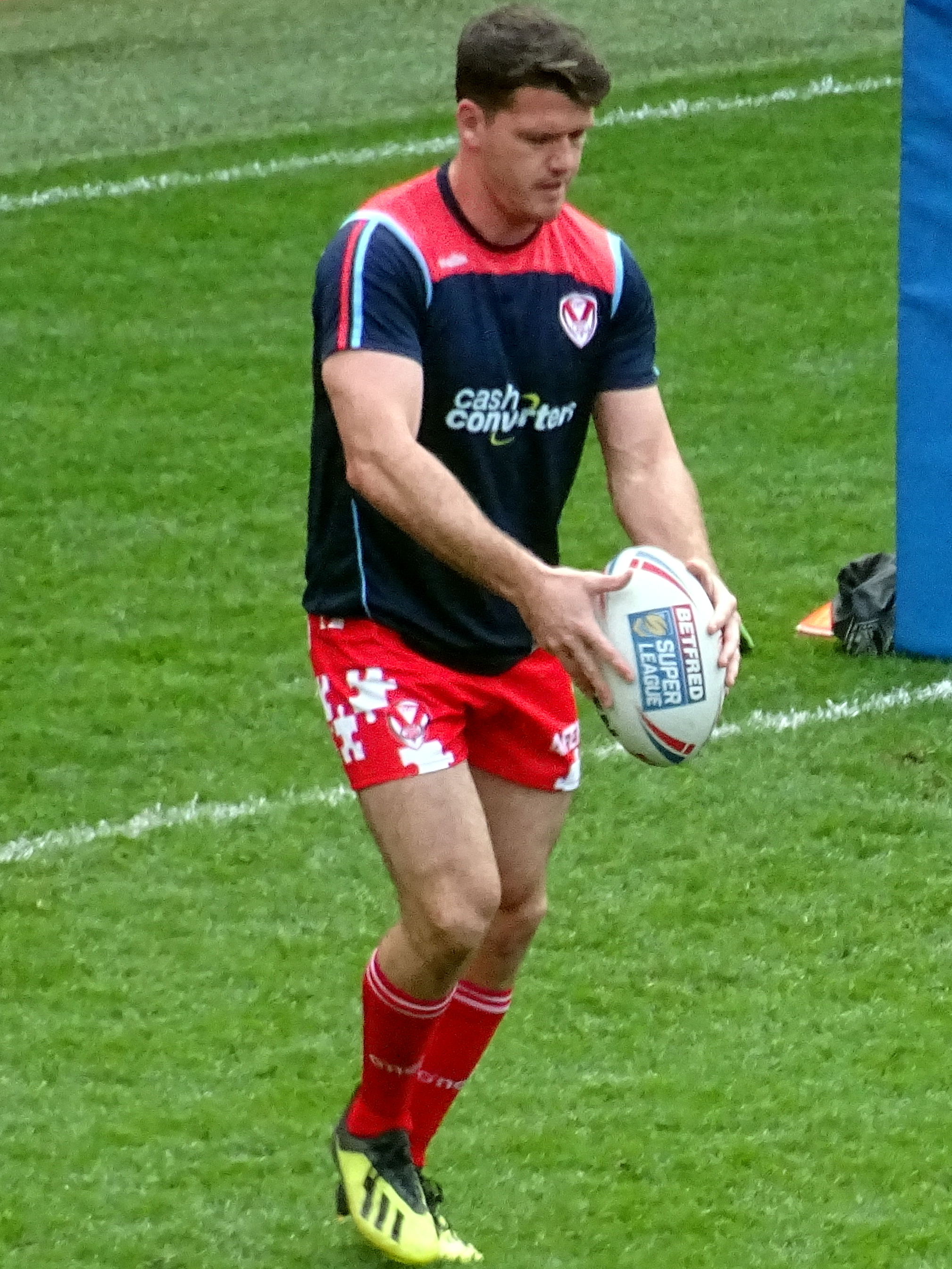

Personal information
- Full name: Lachlan Coote
- Born: 6 April 1990 (age 36) Windsor, New South Wales, Australia
- Height: 5 ft 10 in (1.79 m)
- Weight: 13 st 5 lb (85 kg)

Playing information
- Position: Fullback
Club
Years	Team	Pld	T	G	FG	P
2008–13	Penrith Panthers	83	43	10	1	193
2014–18	North Qld Cowboys	83	15	0	4	64
2019–21	St Helens	66	34	284	1	705
2022–23	Hull Kingston Rovers	27	11	58	1	161
	Total	259	103	352	7	1123
Representative
Years	Team	Pld	T	G	FG	P
2010–12	City Origin	2	2	0	0	8
2012	Prime Ministers XIII	1	0	0	0	0
2016	Scotland	3	0	0	0	0
2019	Great Britain	1	0	0	0	0
- Source: As of 28 September 2022

Lachlan Coote (born 6 April 1990) is a former professional rugby league footballer who last played for Hull Kingston Rovers in the Super League.

Coote previously played in the National Rugby League for the Penrith Panthers and the North Queensland Cowboys, with whom he won the 2015 NRL premiership and 2016 World Club Challenge. Coote represented Scotland and Great Britain at an international level, and also played for the City Origin and Prime Minister's XIII teams.

== Background ==
Coote was born in Windsor, New South Wales, Australia. He was raised in Sydney's Greater West, and is of Scottish descent

He played his junior rugby league for the Windsor Wolves, and attended Windsor High School He was a representative of New South Wales and Australia at junior level.

== Early career ==
Coote joined the Penrith Panthers as a teenager, playing in their premiership-winning Harold Matthews Cup team in 2006. In 2007, he played in the Panthers' S.G. Ball Cup team that lost in the grand final to the Parramatta Eels. Coote was named player of the tournament and was named to play for New South Wales under-17. Later that year he represented the Australian Schoolboys on their undefeated tour of New Zealand.

Coote started the 2008 season playing for the Panthers in the inaugural season of the National Youth Competition. A clear stand out performer, Coote scored 138 points in 12 games and was selected in the New South Wales under-18 side, scoring 14 points in the Blues' victory over Queensland. At the end of the season he was named at fullback in the NYC Team of the Year.

== Playing career ==
=== 2008 ===
After regular Penrith fullback Rhys Wesser was ruled out with injury, Coote made his first grade début on 27 June in the Round 16 clash with the Brisbane Broncos at CUA Stadium. In the first draw of the 2008 season, he had an outstanding game, winning Man of the Match. While Wesser returned from injury in the next game against Parramatta, Coote remained in the first grade side, being named as winger. At the end of the season, he was awarded Penrith's Ben Alexander Rookie of the Year award.

=== 2009 ===
After the departure of Rhys Wesser to the South Sydney Rabbitohs, Coote started the season as Penrith's first choice fullback. In Round 3 against the Manly-Warringah Sea Eagles, he scored his first NRL try in the 12–10 win at Brookvale Oval. In Round 14 against Manly-Warringah, Coote suffered a season-ending shoulder injury and finished the year with 12 matches and four tries.

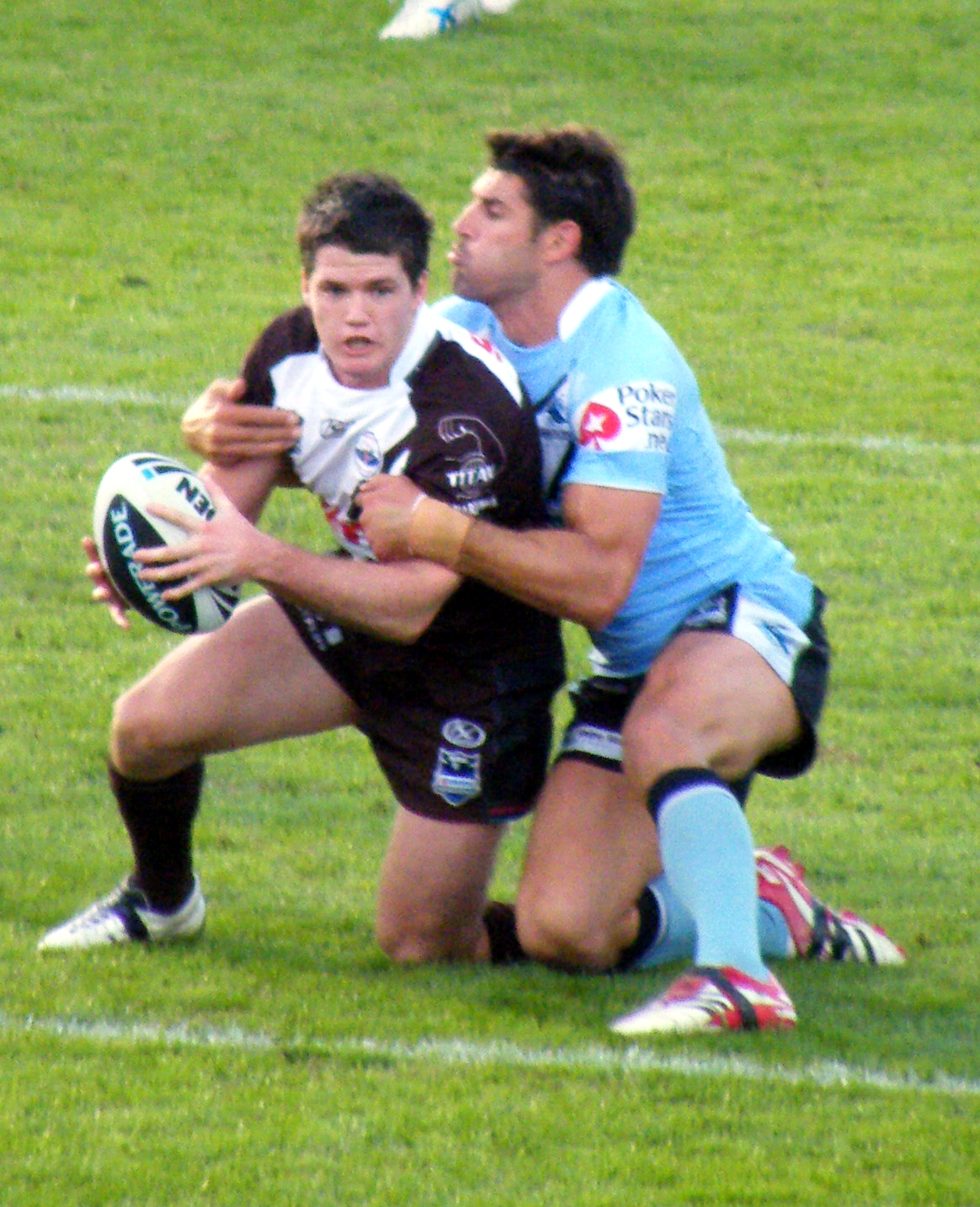
Coote playing for Penrith in 2010

=== 2010 ===
In an effort to prevent further injury, Coote added 10 kg of muscle to his frame in the off-season and started the 2010 season weighing in at 85 kilograms. He played his first full season of NRL, playing 20 games and scoring a career-high 17 tries, including a hat trick against the Gold Coast Titans in Round 8. He represented NSW City for the first time, starting at fullback and scoring a try in their 30–18 loss to Country.

=== 2011 ===
After battling osteitis pubis throughout the 2010 season, Coote opted for surgery in the offseason and returned in time for Round 1. He finished the year with 15 appearances and was the Panthers equal highest tryscorer alongside David Simmons with 12 tries.

=== 2012 ===
Despite Penrith finishing in second last place, Coote represented NSW City for the second time and lined up for the Prime Minister's XIII in their annual end of season match against Papua New Guinea. He finished the season at five-eighth after coach Ivan Cleary moved him from fullback in Round 20.

=== 2013 ===
Coote started the 2013 NRL season at five-eighth but tore his pectoral muscle in Round 2 against the Wests Tigers. Despite being ruled out for the season, Coote returned in round 22, playing in the club's last five games.

On 2 September, Penrith announced that Coote had been released from the final year of his contract to sign a three-year deal with the North Queensland Cowboys.

Of Scottish descent, Coote was named in Scotland's squad for the 2013 Rugby League World Cup but withdrew to focus on a full pre-season with the Cowboys.

=== 2014 ===
Coote tore his anterior cruciate ligament (ACL) in North Queensland's first game at the Auckland Nines, ruling him out for the entire 2014 NRL season.

=== 2015 ===
Coote started the season in the Queensland Cup, playing two games for the Cowboys' affiliate side the Northern Pride. He made his North Queensland début in their round 3 loss to Brisbane, playing fullback. He would go on to cement his spot as the club's first choice fullback, as the side went on a club record 11 game winning streak.

Coote continued to contribute successfully throughout the 2015 season, and solidified himself as a premier playmaker alongside Dally M medalist Johnathan Thurston as well as hooker, Jake Granville, and five eighth Michael Morgan. The 'spine' for the North Queensland Cowboys was instrumental in their success during the 2015 season. These four players were named NRL.com's #1 playmaking spine for 2015. Coote was named by popular NRL journalist Andrew Voss, as the #1 fullback in the competition at defusing kicks. as well as being lauded for his impressive positional play at fullback.

On 4 October, Coote was a member of North Queensland's Grand Final winning side, starting at fullback in the 17–16 victory over the Brisbane Broncos.

=== 2016 ===
Coote was named in the North Queensland club's 2016 NRL Auckland Nines squad. On 21 February, he was a member of the Cowboys' 2016 World Club Challenge winning side, starting at fullback in the side's 38–4 victory over the Leeds Rhinos at Headingley Stadium.

On 27 April, despite much larger deals being offered elsewhere, Coote re-signed with North Queensland until the end of the 2018 season, after his early season form saw him touted as a possible selection for New South Wales.

In May, Coote was selected in the City Origin side but withdrew due to a rib injury. Coote ended 2016 having started every game for the Cowboys' at fullback

In October, Coote was named in Scotland's 2016 Four Nations squad. In the final round of the tournament, Coote was awarded man of the match honours in Scotland's 18–18 upset draw with world number one nation New Zealand.

=== 2017 ===
Despite an injury interrupted start to the season, Coote played 21 games for North Queensland in 2017, scoring two tries and kicking two field goals. On 1 October, he started at fullback in the club's 2017 NRL Grand Final loss to the Melbourne Storm.

=== 2018 ===
Coote missed the first three games of the 2018 NRL season due to a hamstring injury. Upon returning from injury he played for the Cowboys' Queensland Cup feeder side, the Mackay Cutters. He returned to North Queensland in Round 6 but played just 9 games throughout the season, with Ben Hampton and Te Maire Martin being favoured at fullback.

On 28 September, Coote signed with St. Helens on a three-year deal starting in 2019.

=== 2019 ===
He played in the 2019 Challenge Cup Final defeat by the Warrington Wolves at Wembley Stadium.

In Coote's first season at St Helens, the club won the League Leaders Shield after finishing 16 points ahead of second placed Wigan. Coote would then play in the club's 23–6 grand final victory over Salford at Old Trafford.

He was selected in squad for the 2019 Great Britain Lions tour of the Southern Hemisphere. He made his Great Britain test debut in the defeat by Tonga.

=== 2020 ===
Coote was named man of the match in St Helens 48-2 semi-final victory over Catalans Dragons as the club reached yet another grand final.

He played in the club's 8-4 2020 Super League Grand Final victory over Wigan at the Kingston Communications Stadium in Hull.

=== 2021 ===
In the 2021 Challenge Cup semi-final, Coote scored a try and kicked six goals as St Helens defeated Hull FC 33–18 to reach the final.

Coote played for St. Helens in their 2021 Challenge Cup Final victory over Castleford.

On 16 August, it was confirmed that Coote would be moving to Hull Kingston Rovers in the 2022 season on a two-year contract. Coote's last game for St Helens was the 2021 Super League Grand Final where the Saints defeated Catalans Dragons 12–10 to win their third successive title.

=== 2022 ===
In round 1 of the 2022 Super League season, Coote made his club debut for Hull KR in their 24–10 loss against Wigan. On 22 August, Coote was ruled out for the remainder of the 2022 Super League season after suffering his third concussion of the campaign.

=== 2023 ===
In round 8 of the 2023 Super League season, Coote scored a try and kicked six goals as Hull Kingston Rovers defeated arch-rivals Hull F.C. 40–0. On 22 June 2023, Coote announced his retirement with immediate effect, following medical advice.

== Achievements and accolades ==
=== Individual ===
- Penrith Panthers Rookie of the Year: 2008
- Penrith Panthers Members' Player of the Year: 2012
- NYC Team of the Year: 2008
- 2019 Super League Dream Team

=== Team ===
- 2014 NRL Auckland Nines: North Queensland Cowboys – Winners
- 2015 NRL Grand Final: North Queensland Cowboys – Winners
- 2016 World Club Challenge: North Queensland Cowboys – Winners
- 2019 Super League Grand Final: St Helens – Winners
- 2020 Super League Grand Final: St Helens – Winners
- 2021 Super League Grand Final: St Helens - Winners
- 2021 Challenge Cup - St Helens - Winners

== Statistics ==
=== NRL & Super League ===
Statistics are correct to the end of the 2023 season

†	Denotes seasons in which Coote won an NRL Premiership

Season	Team	Matches	T	G	GK %	F/G	Pts
2008	Penrith	5	0	6	54.6	0	12
2009	Penrith	12	4	0	—	0	16
2010	Penrith	20	17	2	66.7	0	72
2011	Penrith	15	12	0	—	0	48
2012	Penrith	24	9	2	100	1	41
2013	Penrith	7	1	0	—	0	4
2015†	North Queensland	26	6	0	—	1	25
2016	North Queensland	27	5	0	—	1	21
2017	North Queensland	21	2	0	—	2	10
2018	North Queensland	9	2	0	—	0	8
2019	St Helens	27	16	117	—	1	321
2020	St Helens	16	10	32	—	0	214
2021	St Helens	23	8	94			236
2022	Hull Kingston Rovers	17	9	32		1	101
2023	Hull Kingston Rovers	10	2	26			60
Career totals		259	103	352	62.5	7	1123

=== International ===
Season	Team	Matches	T	G	GK %	F/G	Pts
2016	Scotland	3	0	0	—	0	0
2019	Great Britain	1					
Career totals		4	0	0	—	0	0

== Personal life ==
Coote has two children, a son named Bailey and a daughter named Mia, with his partner Laura Ottolino.
