= 2014 Super League Grand Final =

St Helens RLFC	Wigan Warriors
14	6
	1	2	Total
STH	2	12	14
WIG	6	0	6
- Date: 11 October 2014
- Stadium: Old Trafford
- Location: (England) Manchester
- Harry Sunderland Trophy: (England) James Roby ( St Helens)
- Headliners: James
- Referee: Phil Bentham
- Attendance: 70,102

Broadcast partners
- Broadcasters: Sky Sports
- Commentators: Eddie Hemmings; Mike Stevenson

The 2014 Super League Grand Final was the 17th official grand final and conclusive and deciding match of Super League XIX. It was held on Saturday 11 October 2014, at Old Trafford, Manchester with a 6pm kick-off time. The game was played between the top two teams from the regular season, St Helens RLFC and Wigan Warriors.

== Background ==
The 2014 Super League season (known as the First Utility Super League XIX due to sponsorship by First Utility) was the 19th season of rugby league football since the Super League format was introduced in 1996. Fourteen teams competed for the League Leaders' Shield over 27 rounds (including the Magic Weekend in Manchester), after which the highest finishing teams will enter the play-offs to compete for a place in the Grand Final and a chance to win the championship and the Super League Trophy.

Pos	Team	Pld	W	D	L	PF	PA	PD	Pts
1	St. Helens	27	19	0	8	796	563	+233	38
2	Wigan Warriors	27	18	1	8	834	429	+405	37

=== Route to the Final ===
==== St Helens ====
St Helens
Round	Opposition	Score
Qualifying Play-Off	Castleford Tigers (H)	41-0
Semi-Final	Catalans Dragons (H)	30-12
Key: (H) = Home venue; (A) = Away venue.

==== Wigan ====
Wigan
Round	Opposition	Score
Qualifying Play-Off	Huddersfield Giants (H)	57-4
Semi-Final	Warrington Wolves (A)	16-12
Key: (H) = Home venue; (A) = Away venue.

== Match details ==
12 October 2014
18:00 BST

St. Helens	14–6	Wigan Warriors
Tries: Soliola 54'; Makinson 69'; Goals: Percival 3/3 30', 54', 69'	(Report)	Tries: Burgess 40'; Goals: Smith 1/3 17'; Flower (red card) 3'

Old Trafford, Manchester
Attendance: 70,102
Referee: Phil Bentham
Player of the Match: James Roby

St Helens		Position	Wigan Warriors	
17	(England) Paul Wellens (c)	Fullback	1	(Australia) Matthew Bowen
2	(England) Tommy Makinson	Wing	2	(England) Josh Charnley
22	(England) Mark Percival	Centre	5	(Cook Islands) Anthony Gelling
4	(England) Josh Jones	Centre	23	(England) Dan Sarginson
5	(England) Adam Swift	Wing	32	(England) Joe Burgess
15	(England) Mark Flanagan	Stand-off	6	(Australia) Blake Green
6	(New Zealand) Lance Hohaia	Scrum-half	7	(England) Matty Smith
16	(Ireland) Kyle Amor	Prop	10	(Wales) Ben Flower
9	(England) James Roby	Hooker	19	(England) Sam Powell
8	(Samoa) Mose Masoe	Prop	17	(England) Dom Crosby
10	(Ireland) Louie McCarthy-Scarsbrook	Second-row	11	(England) Joel Tomkins
11	(New Zealand) Iosia Soliola	Second-row	12	(England) Liam Farrell
3	(England) Jordan Turner	Loose forward	13	(England) Sean O'Loughlin (c)
13	(Tonga) Willie Manu	Interchange	22	(United States) Eddy Pettybourne
18	(England) Alex Walmsley	Interchange	24	(England) Tony Clubb
27	(England) Greg Richards	Interchange	25	(England) John Bateman
28	(England) Luke Thompson	Interchange	27	(England) George Williams
(Australia) Nathan Brown		Coach	(England) Shaun Wane	

Following a fiery opening that started with the kind of big tackles that this derby game has become known for, the game suffered a dramatic twist in only the second minute of the game when Wigan Prop, Ben Flower, became the first and only player to be sent off in a grand final by referee Phil Bentham after he punched Lance Hohaia in the face, thus knocking him out, then as he lay defenceless on the floor, he punched him in the face again.

This forced Wigan to play 78 minutes with 12-men, causing a switch in the Wigan approach to one of smash-and-grab. A valiant first-half performance by Wigan's 12-men meant they entered the break with a 6–2 lead.

Despite further defensive displays by the Wigan outfit in the ensuing second-half, Iosia Soliola forced himself over the Wigan try-line in his final appearance in the Red-Vee to put St. Helens ahead, and in control of the game. An admirable, yet desperate display by Wigan, to get themselves back into contention was halted, when Tommy Makinson crashed over for Saints, 12 minutes from time to make the score 14–6, after a precise kick over-the-top of the Wigan defence from Saints stalwart, Paul Wellens. Despite a late Wigan flurry, Makinson's try proved to be the one that sealed the game and the championship for St. Helens, meaning that the Saints claimed their first championship title since 2006, and their sixth overall in the Super League era (St Helens are now equal with Leeds Rhinos for titles since 1996, both have 6 titles).

== World Club Series ==
By winning this match the Saints had qualified for the World Club Series Final, to be played early in the 2015 season against the winners of the 2014 NRL Grand final, the South Sydney Rabbitohs.
