= 2013 London Broncos season =

- Super League XVIII Rank: 13th
- Challenge Cup: Semi-final
- 2013 record: Wins: 8; draws: 2; losses: 21
- Points scored: For: 565; against: 1054

Team information
- Chairman: David Hughes
- Head Coach: Tony Rea
- Captain: Craig Gower Tony Clubb
- Stadium: Twickenham Stoop
- Avg. attendance: 2,380
- High attendance: 6,274

Top scorers
- Tries: Kieran Dixon - 21
- Goals: Michael Witt - 52
- Points: Michael Witt - 130
Home colours	Away colours
← 2012	List of seasons	2014 →

The 2013 London Broncos season was the thirty-fourth in the club's history and their eighteenth season in the Super League. Competing in Super League XVIII, the club was coached by Tony Rea, finishing in 13th place and reaching the Semi-finals of the 2013 Challenge Cup.

It was the 18th season of the Super League era and their second since returning to the London Broncos name. They came within one match of the Challenge Cup final but finished the Super League season in second to last place.

== 2013 milestones ==
- In August 2012 Tony Rea was named the Bronco's coach for the 2013 season, after serving in a caretaker capacity in the second half of the 2012 season.

== Squad ==
2013 London Broncos Squad
First team squad			Coaching staff
1 Luke Dorn (vc) – FB; 2 Liam Colbon – WG; 3 Jamie O'Callaghan – CE; 4 David Howell – CE; 5 Michael Robertson – WG; 6 Michael Witt – SO; 7 Craig Gower (c) – SH; 8 Antonio Kaufusi – PR; 9 Chad Randall – SH, HK; 10 Mark Bryant – PR; 11 Shane Rodney – SR; 12 Chris Bailey – SR, LF; 13 Tony Clubb – LF, CE	14 Scott Wheeldon – PR; 15 Michael Channing – CE; 16 Chris Melling – CE; 17 Shane Grady – CE; 18 Olsi Krasniqi – PR; 19 Dan Sarginson – SO, CE; 20 Matt Cook – SR; 21 Kieran Dixon – FB; 22 Will Lovell – CE; 23 Tommy Lee – HK; 24 Mike McMeeken – SR; 25 Alex Hurst – CE; 26 Ben Fisher – HK	27 Erjon Dollapi – PR; 28 James Woodburn-Hall – SH; 29 James Mendeika – CE; 30 Mike Bishay – SH; 31 Mason Caton-Brown – CE; 32 Joel Wicks – HK; 33 Jamie Soward – SH; 34 Jacob Fairbank – LF; 35 Harry Little – CE; 36 Ryan Shaw – CE; 37 Rhodri Lloyd – CE; 38 Iliess Macani – CE	Head coach: Tony Rea; Assistant coach: Latham Tawhai; Legend: (c) Captain(s); (vc) Vice-captain(s); Updated: Source(s): London Broncos 2013 squad numbers

== Super League XVIII table ==
Super League XVIII
Pos	Team	Pld	W	D	L	PF	PA	PD	Pts	Qualification
1	Huddersfield Giants (L)	27	21	0	6	851	507	+344	42	Play-offs
2	Warrington Wolves	27	20	1	6	836	461	+375	41	Play-offs
3	Leeds Rhinos	27	18	1	8	712	507	+205	37	Play-offs
4	Wigan Warriors (C)	27	17	1	9	816	460	+356	35	Play-offs
5	St. Helens	27	15	1	11	678	536	+142	31	Play-offs
6	Hull F.C.	27	13	2	12	652	563	+89	28	Play-offs
7	Catalans Dragons	27	13	2	12	619	604	+15	28	Play-offs
8	Hull Kingston Rovers	27	13	0	14	642	760	−118	26	Play-offs
9	Bradford Bulls	27	10	2	15	640	658	−18	22	
10	Widnes Vikings	27	10	2	15	695	841	−146	22	
11	Wakefield Trinity Wildcats	27	10	1	16	660	749	−89	21	
12	Castleford Tigers	27	9	2	16	702	881	−179	20	
13	London Broncos	27	5	2	20	487	946	−459	12	
14	Salford City Reds	27	6	1	20	436	953	−517	11 (Note: Salford deducted 2 points on 14 June 2013 for fielding 14 players during home game against Castleford)	

Source: superleague.co.uk and BBC Sport
Rules for classification: 1st on competition points; 2nd on match points difference. Competition points: for win = 2; for draw = 1; for loss = 0.
(C) Champions; (L) League Leaders' Shield Winners

== 2013 fixtures and results ==
Super League XVIII

Date	Competition	Rnd	Vrs	Venue	Result	Score	Tries	Goals	Att	Live on TV	Report
3 February 2013	Super League XVIII	1	Widnes Vikings	Twickenham Stoop							
0/0/13	Super League XVIII	2	Giants	Galpharm Stadium							
0/0/13	Super League XVIII	3	Salford City Reds	Twickenham Stoop							
0/0/13	Super League XVIII	4	Warrington Wolves	Halliwell Jones Stadium							
0/0/13	Super League XVIII	5	Wakefield Trinity Wildcats	Rapid Solicitors Stadium							
0/0/13	Super League XVIII	6	Bradford Bulls	Twickenham Stoop							
0/0/13	Super League XVIII	7	Leeds Rhinos	Headingley Carnegie Stadium							
0/0/13	Super League XVIII	8	Castleford Tigers	Twickenham Stoop							
0/0/13	Super League XVIII	9	Catalans Dragons	Stade Gilbert Brutus							
0/0/13	Super League XVIII	10	Huddersfield Giants	Twickenham Stoop							
0/0/13	Super League XVIII	11	Hull KR	MS3 Craven Park							
0/0/13	Super League XVIII	12	Wigan Warriors	Twickenham Stoop							
0/0/13	Super League XVIII	13	Widnes Vikings	Stobart Stadium							
0/0/13	Super League XVIII	14	St Helens	Langtree Park							
0/0/13	Super League XVIII	15	Hull FC	Twickenham Stoop							
0/0/13	Super League XVIII	16	Salford City Reds	City of Salford Stadium							
0/0/13	Super League XVIII	17	Warrington Wolves	Twickenham Stoop							
0/0/13	Super League XVIII	18	Wakefield Trinity Wildcats	Twickenham Stoop							
0/0/13	Super League XVIII	19	Bradford Bulls	Grattan Stadium							
0/0/13	Super League XVIII	20	Leeds Rhinos	Twickenham Stoop							
0/0/13	Super League XVIII	21	Castleford Tigers	Probiz Coliseum							
0/0/13	Super League XVIII	22	Catalans Dragons	Twickenham Stoop							
0/0/13	Super League XVIII	23	Huddersfield Giants	Galpharm Stadium							
31 August 2013	Super League XVIII	24	Hull KR	Twickenham Stoop							
7 September 2013	Super League XVIII	25	Wigan Warriors	DW Stadium							

== 2013 transfers in/out ==
In

Name	Position	Signed from	Date
Shane Grady	Centre	Thirroul Butchers	July 2012
Tommy Lee	Hooker	Huddersfield Giants	September 2012

Out

Name	Position	Club Signed	Date
Karl Temata	Prop	Limoux Grizzlies	September 2012
Lamont Bryan	Centre	Featherstone Rovers	September 2012
Rob Thomas	Prop	Released	September 2012
Jason Golden	Second Row	York City Knights	September 2012
Julien Rinaldi	Hooker	Retirement	September 2012

== Squad statistics ==
Squad Number	Name	International country	Position	Previous club	Appearances	Tries	Goals	Drop Goals	Points	Notes
1	Luke Dorn	(Australia)	Fullback	Castleford Tigers	20	6	0	0	24	
2	Liam Colbon	(England)	Wing	Hull Kingston Rovers	15	3	0	0	12	
3	Jamie O'Callaghan	(Ireland)	Centre	London Broncos Academy	13	2	0	0	8	
4	David Howell	(Australia)	Centre	Canberra Raiders	6	2	0	0	8	
5	Michael Robertson	(Scotland)	Wing	Manly-Warringah Sea Eagles	15	3	0	0	12	
6	Michael Witt	(Australia)	Stand-off	Crusaders RL	21	6	52	2	130	
7	Craig Gower	(Australia)	Scrum-half	Aviron Bayonnais RU	16	3	0	0	12	
8	Antonio Kaufusi	(Australia) (Tonga)	Prop	Newcastle Knights	27	0	0	0	0	
9	Chad Randall	(Australia)	Hooker	Manly-Warringah Sea Eagles	11	2	0	0	8	
10	Mark Bryant	(Australia)	Prop	Crusaders RL	29	2	1	0	10	
11	Shane Rodney	(Australia)	Second-row	Manly-Warringah Sea Eagles	18	2	0	0	8	
12	Chris Bailey	(Australia)	Second-row	Manly-Warringah Sea Eagles	19	8	0	0	32	
13	Tony Clubb	(England)	Loose forward	London Broncos Academy	9	1	0	0	4	
14	Scott Wheeldon	(England)	Prop	Hull Kingston Rovers	20	2	0	0	8	
15	Michael Channing	(Wales)	Centre	London Broncos Academy	12	1	0	0	4	
16	Chris Melling	(England)	Centre	Wigan Warriors	20	2	0	0	8	
17	Shane Grady	(England)	Second-row	Thirroul Butchers	11	1	2	0	8	
18	Olsi Krasniqi	(Albania)	Prop	London Broncos Academy	23	0	0	0	0	
19	Dan Sarginson	(England)	Centre	London Broncos Academy	22	6	0	0	24	
20	Matt Cook	(England)	Second-row	Hull Kingston Rovers	23	3	0	0	12	
21	Kieran Dixon	(England)	Wing	London Broncos Academy	24	21	1	0	86	
22	Will Lovell	(England)	Second-row	London Broncos Academy	15	0	0	0	0	
23	Tommy Lee	(England)	Hooker	Huddersfield Giants	24	2	0	0	8	
24	Mike McMeeken	(England)	Second-row	London Broncos Academy	13	0	0	0	0	
25	Alex Hurst	(Scotland)	Centre	Swinton Lions	11	2	0	0	8	
26	Ben Fisher	(Scotland)	Hooker	Hull Kingston Rovers	24	1	0	0	4	
27	Erjon Dollapi	(Albania)	Prop	London Broncos Academy	11	2	0	0	8	
28	James Woodburn-Hall	(Jamaica)	Scrum-half	London Broncos Academy	8	1	0	0	4	
29	James Mendeika	(Ireland)	Centre	Warrington Wolves	6	2	0	0	8	loan
30	Mike Bishay	(England)	Scrum-half	London Broncos Academy	8	1	0	0	4	
31	Mason Caton-Brown	(Jamaica)	Centre	London Broncos Academy	2	4	0	0	16	
32	Joel Wicks	(England)	Hooker	London Broncos Academy	6	0	0	0	0	
33	Jamie Soward	(Australia)	Scrum-half	St. George Illawarra Dragons	9	5	23	1	67	
34	Jacob Fairbank	(England)	Loose forward	Huddersfield Giants	6	1	0	0	4	loan
35	Harry Little	(England)	Centre	London Broncos Academy	2	0	0	0	0	
36	Ryan Shaw	(England)	Centre	Warrington Wolves	2	1	2	0	8	loan
37	Rhodri Lloyd	(Wales)	Centre	Wigan Warriors	4	1	0	0	4	loan
38	Iliess Macani	(England)	Centre	London Broncos Academy	2	1	0	0	4	
