= 2012 London Broncos season =

- Super League XVII Rank: 12th
- Challenge Cup: Quarter final
- 2012 record: Wins: 9; draws: 0; losses: 21
- Points scored: For: 696; against: 960

Team information
- Chairman: David Hughes
- Head Coach: Rob Powell (until July 2012); Tony Rea (July 2012 onwards)
- Captain: Craig Gower
- Stadium: The Stoop
- Avg. attendance: 2,532
- High attendance: 4,924

Top scorers
- Tries: Kieran Dixon - 16; Luke Dorn - 16
- Goals: Michael Witt - 52
- Points: Michael Witt - 136
| Home colours | Away colours |
| ← 2011 | List of seasons | 2013 → |

The 2012 London Broncos season was the thirty-third in the club's history, their seventeenth season in the Super League and their first re-branded back to the London Broncos. Competing in Super League XVII, the club was coached by Rob Powell until midseason when he was replaced by Tony Rea. They finished in 12th place and reaching the Quarter Finals of the 2012 Challenge Cup.

They were captained by Craig Gower, finishing Super League's regular season 12th out of 14 teams, thus failing to reach the play-offs for the 7th consecutive year.

== Super League XVII table ==
Super League XVII
| Pos | Team | Pld | W | D | L | PF | PA | PD | Pts | Qualification |
|---|---|---|---|---|---|---|---|---|---|---|
| 1 | Wigan Warriors (L) | 27 | 21 | 0 | 6 | 994 | 449 | +545 | 42 | Play-offs |
| 2 | Warrington Wolves | 27 | 20 | 1 | 6 | 909 | 539 | +370 | 41 | Play-offs |
| 3 | St Helens | 27 | 17 | 2 | 8 | 795 | 480 | +315 | 36 | Play-offs |
| 4 | Catalans Dragons | 27 | 18 | 0 | 9 | 812 | 611 | +201 | 36 | Play-offs |
| 5 | Leeds Rhinos (C) | 27 | 16 | 0 | 11 | 823 | 662 | +161 | 32 | Play-offs |
| 6 | Hull F.C. | 27 | 15 | 2 | 10 | 696 | 621 | +75 | 32 | Play-offs |
| 7 | Huddersfield Giants | 27 | 14 | 0 | 13 | 699 | 664 | +35 | 28 | Play-offs |
| 8 | Wakefield Trinity Wildcats | 27 | 13 | 0 | 14 | 633 | 764 | −131 | 26 | Play-offs |
| 9 | Bradford Bulls | 27 | 14 | 1 | 12 | 633 | 756 | −123 | 23 (Note: Bradford Bulls deducted 6 points on 25 July 2012 for entering administration) | |
| 10 | Hull Kingston Rovers | 27 | 10 | 1 | 16 | 753 | 729 | +24 | 21 | |
| 11 | Salford City Reds | 27 | 8 | 1 | 18 | 618 | 844 | −226 | 17 | |
| 12 | London Broncos | 27 | 7 | 0 | 20 | 588 | 890 | −302 | 14 | |
| 13 | Castleford Tigers | 27 | 6 | 0 | 21 | 554 | 948 | −394 | 12 | |
| 14 | Widnes Vikings | 27 | 6 | 0 | 21 | 532 | 1082 | −550 | 12 | |

Source: superleague.co.uk and BBC Sport.
Rules for classification: 1st on competition points; 2nd on match points difference.
Competition points: for win = 2; for draw = 1; for loss = 0.
(C) Champions; (L) League Leaders' Shield Winners

== 2012 Squad ==
| Squad Number | Name | International country | Position | Age | Previous club | Appearances | Tries | Goals | Drop Goals | Points |
|---|---|---|---|---|---|---|---|---|---|---|
| 1 | Luke Dorn | (Australia) | Fullback | 30 | Castleford Tigers | 24 | 16 | 0 | 0 | 64 |
| 2 | Liam Colbon | (England) | Wing | 27 | Hull Kingston Rovers | 8 | 2 | 0 | 0 | 8 |
| 3 | Jamie O'Callaghan | (Ireland) | Centre | 21 | London Broncos Academy | 27 | 5 | 0 | 0 | 20 |
| 4 | David Howell | (Australia) | Centre | 28 | Canberra Raiders | 20 | 3 | 0 | 0 | 12 |
| 5 | Michael Robertson | (Scotland) | Wing | 29 | Manly Sea Eagles | 26 | 15 | 0 | 0 | 60 |
| 6 | Michael Witt | (Australia) | Stand-off | 28 | Crusaders RL | 22 | 8 | 52 | 0 | 136 |
| 7 | Craig Gower | (Australia) | Scrum-half | 34 | (France) Aviron Bayonnais RU | 29 | 4 | 27 | 0 | 70 |
| 8 | Antonio Kaufusi | (Tonga) | Prop | 27 | Newcastle Knights | 29 | 8 | 0 | 0 | 32 |
| 9 | Chad Randall | (Australia) | Hooker | 31 | Manly Sea Eagles | 30 | 4 | 0 | 0 | 16 |
| 10 | Mark Bryant | (Australia) | Prop | 31 | Crusaders RL | 30 | 1 | 0 | 0 | 4 |
| 11 | Shane Rodney | (Australia) | Second-row | 29 | Manly Sea Eagles | 15 | 2 | 16 | 0 | 40 |
| 12 | Chris Bailey | (Australia) | Second-row | 30 | Manly Sea Eagles | 27 | 7 | 0 | 0 | 28 |
| 13 | Tony Clubb | (England) | Loose forward | 25 | London Broncos Academy | 26 | 6 | 0 | 0 | 24 |
| 14 | Julien Rinaldi | (France) | Hooker | 33 | Wakefield Trinity Wildcats | 20 | 1 | 0 | 0 | 4 |
| 15 | Karl Temata | (Cook Islands) | Prop | 34 | New Zealand Warriors | 9 | 0 | 0 | 0 | 0 |
| 16 | Chris Melling | (England) | Second-row | 27 | Wigan Warriors | 22 | 3 | 2 | 0 | 16 |
| 17 | Jason Golden | (England) | Second-row | 26 | Wakefield Trinity Wildcats | 9 | 1 | 0 | 0 | 4 |
| 18 | Olsi Krasniqi | (Albania) | Loose forward | 20 | London Broncos Academy | 16 | 2 | 0 | 0 | 8 |
| 19 | Dan Sarginson | (England) | Centre | 19 | London Broncos Academy | 19 | 5 | 0 | 0 | 20 |
| 20 | Matt Cook | (England) | Second-row | 25 | Hull Kingston Rovers | 14 | 4 | 0 | 0 | 16 |
| 21 | Kieran Dixon | (England) | Wing | 20 | London Broncos Academy | 27 | 16 | 1 | 0 | 66 |
| 22 | Ben Bolger | (England) | Second-row | 22 | London Broncos Academy | 11 | 1 | 0 | 0 | 4 |
| 23 | Omari Caro | (Jamaica) | Wing | 21 | London Broncos Academy | 12 | 4 | 0 | 0 | 16 |
| 24 | Lamont Bryan | (Jamaica) | Second-row | 21 | London Broncos Academy | 0 | 0 | 0 | 0 | 0 |
| 26 | Rob Thomas | (England) | Prop | 21 | London Broncos Academy | 0 | 0 | 0 | 0 | 0 |
| 27 | Sam Bolger | (England) | Scrum-half | 20 | London Broncos Academy | 1 | 0 | 0 | 0 | 0 |
| 28 | Michael Channing | (Wales) | Centre | 20 | London Broncos Academy | 8 | 1 | 0 | 0 | 4 |
| 29 | Erjon Dollapi | (Albania) | Prop | 18 | London Broncos Academy | 0 | 0 | 0 | 0 | 0 |
| 30 | Scott Wheeldon | (England) | Prop | 26 | Hull Kingston Rovers | 16 | 3 | 0 | 0 | 12 |
| 31 | Will Lovell | (England) | Centre | 19 | London Broncos Academy | 10 | 3 | 0 | 0 | 12 |
| 32 | Mike McMeeken | (England) | Second-row | 18 | London Broncos Academy | 3 | 0 | 0 | 0 | 0 |
