= 2011 Harlequins Rugby League season =

- Super League XVI Rank: 12th
- Challenge Cup: Fifth round
- 2011 record: Wins: 7; draws: 1; losses: 21
- Points scored: For: 524; against: 951

Team information
- Chairman: David Hughes
- Head coach: Rob Powell
- Captain: Rob Purdham
- Stadium: The Stoop
- Avg. attendance: 3131
- High attendance: 4423

Top scorers
- Tries: Luke Dorn - 15
- Goals: Luke Gale - 82
- Points: Luke Gale - 198
Home colours	Away colours
← 2010	List of seasons	2012 →

The 2011 Harlequins Rugby League season was the thirty-second in the club's history and their sixteenth season in the Super League. The club was coached by Rob Powell, competing in Super League XVI, finishing in 12th place and reaching the Fifth round of the 2011 Challenge Cup.

It was their fifth consecutive season at the Stoop. They exited the Challenge Cup with a defeat to the Leeds Rhinos.

== 2011 squad ==
Harlequins Rugby League 2011 Squad
First team squad			Coaching staff
1 (Australia) Luke Dorn (vc) – FB, SO; 2 (Ireland) Jamie O'Callaghan – WG, CE, FB; 3 (England) Tony Clubb – CE, SR; 4 (Australia) David Howell – CE; 5 (England) Chris Melling – WG, CE, FB; 6 (England) Luke Gale – SO, SH; 7 (Australia) Chad Randall – HK, SH; 8 (Cook Islands) Karl Temata – SR; 9 (England) Andy Ellis – HK; 10 (Scotland) Oliver Wilkes – PR; 11 (Greece) Nick Kouparitsas – SR; 12 (Australia) Chris Bailey – SR, LF; 13 (England) Rob Purdham – LF	14 (Ireland) Jason Golden – SR, LF; 15 (England) Luke Ambler – PR; 16 (England) Mike Burnett – SR; 17 (England) Danny Ward – PR; 18 (England) Dave Williams – PR; 19 (Jamaica) Lamont Bryan – SR; 20 (England) Ben Bolger – SR; 21 (Albania) Olsi Krasniqi – PR; 22 (England) Omari Caro – WG; 23 (England) Mark Calderwood – WG; 24 (England) Dan Sarginson – CE, SO; 25 (England) Jack Latus – WG; 26 (England) Rob Thomas – PR	27 (England) Joe Ridley – CE; 28 (England) Sam Bolger – SO; 29 (England) Will Lovell – SR, CE; 30 (England) Max Edwards – SH; 31 (England) Karl Pryce – WG, CE; 32 (England) Joe Mellor – SH, SO; 33 (England) Lee Mitchell – SR; 34 (England) Kyle Briggs – SO, SH; 35 (England) Chris Riley – WG, FB	Head coach: (England) Rob Powell; Assistant coach: (New Zealand) Latham Tawhai; Legend: (c) Captain(s); (vc) Vice-captain(s); Injured; Updated: 2011; Source(s): Harlequins Rugby League squad 2011

== Super League XVI table ==
Pos	Team	Pld	W	D	L	PF	PA	PD	Pts	Qualification
1	Warrington Wolves (L)	27	22	0	5	1072	401	+671	44	Play-offs
2	Wigan Warriors	27	20	3	4	852	432	+420	43	Play-offs
3	St Helens	27	17	3	7	782	515	+267	37	Play-offs
4	Huddersfield Giants	27	16	0	11	707	524	+183	32	Play-offs
5	Leeds Rhinos (C)	27	15	1	11	757	603	+154	31	Play-offs
6	Catalans Dragons	27	15	1	11	689	626	+63	31	Play-offs
7	Hull Kingston Rovers	27	14	0	13	713	692	+21	28	Play-offs
8	Hull F.C.	27	13	1	13	718	569	+149	27	Play-offs
9	Castleford Tigers	27	12	2	13	664	808	−144	26	
10	Bradford Bulls	27	9	2	16	570	826	−256	20	
11	Salford City Reds	27	10	0	17	542	809	−267	20	
12	Harlequins	27	6	1	20	524	951	−427	13	
13	Wakefield Trinity Wildcats	27	7	0	20	453	957	−504	10 (Note: Wakefield deducted 4 points for entering administration.)	
14	Crusaders	27	6	0	21	527	857	−330	8 (Note: Crusaders deducted 4 points for entering administration.)	

Source: rugbyleagueproject.org
Rules for classification: 1) Points; 2) Points difference; 3) Number of points scored;
(C) Champions; (L) League Leaders' Shield winners

== Squad statistics ==
Squad Number	Name	International country	Position	Previous club	Appearances	Tries	Goals	Drop Goals	Points	Notes
1	Luke Dorn	(Australia)	Fullback	Castleford Tigers	23	14	0	0	56	
2	Jamie O'Callaghan	(Ireland)	Wing	London Broncos Academy	27	7	0	0	28	
3	Tony Clubb	(England)	Centre	London Broncos Academy	29	13	0	0	52	
4	David Howell	(Australia)	Centre	Canberra Raiders	14	1	0	0	4	
5	Chris Melling	(England)	Wing	Wigan Warriors	27	9	4	0	44	
6	Luke Gale	(England)	Stand-off	Doncaster	28	9	84	2	206	
7	Chad Randall	(Australia)	Hooker	Manly Sea Eagles	27	5	0	0	20	
8	Karl Temata	(Cook Islands)	Prop	New Zealand Warriors	25	3	0	0	12	
9	Andy Ellis	(England)	Hooker	Barrow Raiders	26	5	0	0	20	
10	Oliver Wilkes	(Scotland)	Prop	Wakefield Trinity Wildcats	27	5	0	0	20	
11	Nick Kouparitsas	(Greece)	Second-row	Sydney Roosters	16	2	0	0	8	
12	Chris Bailey	(Australia)	Second-row	Manly Sea Eagles	25	3	0	0	12	
13	Rob Purdham	(England)	Loose forward	Whitehaven	19	2	2	0	12	
14	Jason Golden	(England)	Second-row	Wakefield Trinity Wildcats	5	0	0	0	0	
15	Luke Ambler	(Ireland)	Prop	Leeds Rhinos	24	1	0	0	4	loan
16	Mike Burnett	(England)	Second-row	Hull FC	21	1	0	0	4	loan
17	Danny Ward	(England)	Prop	Hull Kingston Rovers	26	0	0	0	0	
18	Dave Williams	(England)	Prop	London Broncos Academy	10	0	0	0	0	
19	Lamont Bryan	(Jamaica)	Second-row	London Broncos Academy	8	1	0	0	4	
20	Ben Bolger	(England)	Second-row	London Broncos Academy	6	3	0	0	12	
21	Olsi Krasniqi	(Albania)	Prop	London Broncos Academy	15	0	0	0	0	
22	Omari Caro	(Jamaica)	Wing	London Broncos Academy	0	0	0	0	0	
23	Mark Calderwood	(England)	Wing	Hull FC	15	3	0	0	12	
24	Dan Sarginson	(England)	Centre	London Broncos Academy	9	6	0	0	24	
25	Jack Latus	(England)	Wing	Hull Kingston Rovers	0	0	0	0	0	
26	Rob Thomas	(England)	Prop	London Broncos Academy	0	0	0	0	0	
27	Joe Ridley	(England)	Centre	London Broncos Academy	0	0	0	0	0	
28	Sam Bolger	(England)	Scrum-half	London Broncos Academy	0	0	0	0	0	
29	Will Lovell	(England)	Second-row	London Broncos Academy	0	0	0	0	0	
30	Max Edwards	(England)	Scrum-half	London Broncos Academy	0	0	0	0	0	
31	Karl Pryce	(Jamaica)	Wing	Wigan Warriors	18	12	0	0	48	loan
32	Joe Mellor	(England)	Scrum-half	Wigan Warriors	1	0	0	0	0	loan
33	Lee Mitchell	(England)	Second-row	Warrington Wolves	12	1	0	0	4	loan
34	Kyle Briggs	(England)	Stand-off	Bradford Bulls	3	0	0	0	0	loan
35	Chris Riley	(England)	Wing	Warrington Wolves	3	2	0	0	8	loan
