= 2014 London Broncos season =

- Super League XIX Rank: 14th
- Challenge Cup: Fourth Round
- 2014 record: Wins: 1; draws: 0; losses: 27
- Points scored: For: 462; against: 1277

Team information
- Chairman: David Hughes
- Head Coach: Tony Rea (until 5 May 2014); Joey Grima (from 5 May 2014)
- Captain: Matt Cook
- Stadium: The Hive Stadium
- Avg. attendance: 3798
- High attendance: 36,339

Top scorers
- Tries: Denny Solomona - 10
- Goals: Josh Drinkwater - 58
- Points: Josh Drinkwater - 136
Home colours	Away colours
← 2013	List of seasons	2015 →

The 2014 London Broncos season was the thirty-fifth in the club's history and their nineteenth season in the Super League. Competing in Super League XIX, the club was coached by Tony Rea before being replaced midseason by Joey Grima. They were relegated in 14th place and reached the Fourth Round of the 2014 Challenge Cup.

2014 was their first since moving to the Hive Stadium, but after 19 consecutive seasons in the top flight it was to be their last season in the Super League. They exited the Challenge Cup with a defeat by the Catalans Dragons.

== 2014 squad ==
London Broncos 2014 Squad
First team squad			Coaching staff
1 (Tonga) Nesiasi Mataitonga – FB; 2 (England) Kieran Dixon – WG; 3 (Australia) Jordan Atkins – CE, WG; 4 (England) Thomas Minns – CE; 5 (England) James Duckworth – WG; 6 (Australia) Ben Farrar – CE, FB, SO; 7 (Australia) Josh Drinkwater – SH; 8 (Tonga) Atelea Vea – SR; 9 (England) Scott Moore – HK; 10 (Albania) Olsi Krasniqi – PR; 11 (England) Mike McMeeken – SR; 12 (England) Matt Cook (c) – SR; 13 (England) Alex Foster – LF	14 (England) Mike Bishay – SH, HK; 15 (England) James Greenwood – PR; 16 (Australia) Nick Slyney – PR, LF; 17 (England) Will Lovell – SR, CE; 18 (England) George Griffin – SR; 19 (Albania) Erjon Dollapi – PR; 20 (England) James Cunningham – HK; 21 (England) Joel Wicks – HK, CE; 22 (England) James Woodburn-Hall – SO, SH; 23 (Samoa) Denny Solomona – WG, FB; 24 (England) Mason Caton-Brown – CE, WG; 25 (England) Iliess Macani – WG, FB; 26 (France) Tony Gigot – SO	27 (Ireland) Jamie O'Callaghan – WG, CE, FB; 28 (England) Carl Forster – PR; 29 (Scotland) Harvey Burnett – CE; 30 (Malta) Jon Wallace – PR; 31 (France) Maxime Herold – PR; 32 (England) Toby Everett – PR, SR; 33 (Ireland) Joe Keyes – SH, SO; 34 (Scotland) Oscar Thomas – SO, FB; 35 (Scotland) Alex Walker – FB	Head coach: (Australia) Tony Rea; Assistant coach: (Australia) Joey Grima; Legend: (c) Captain(s); (vc) Vice-captain(s); Injured; Updated: 2014; Source(s): London Broncos squad 2014

== Super League XIX table ==
Super League XIX
Pos	Team	Pld	W	D	L	PF	PA	PD	Pts	Qualification
1	St Helens (L, C)	27	19	0	8	796	563	+233	38	Play-offs
2	Wigan Warriors	27	18	1	8	834	429	+405	37	Play-offs
3	Huddersfield Giants	27	17	3	7	785	626	+159	37	Play-offs
4	Castleford Tigers	27	17	2	8	814	583	+231	36	Play-offs
5	Warrington Wolves	27	17	1	9	793	515	+278	35	Play-offs
6	Leeds Rhinos	27	15	2	10	685	421	+264	32	Play-offs
7	Catalans Dragons	27	14	1	12	733	667	+66	29	Play-offs
8	Widnes Vikings	27	13	1	13	611	725	−114	27	Play-offs
9	Hull Kingston Rovers	27	10	3	14	627	665	−38	23	
10	Salford Red Devils	27	11	1	15	608	695	−87	23	
11	Hull F.C.	27	10	2	15	653	586	+67	22	
12	Wakefield Trinity Wildcats	27	10	1	16	557	750	−193	21	
13	Bradford Bulls (R)	27	8	0	19	512	984	−472	10 (Note: Bradford Bulls deducted 6 points on 25 February 2014 for entering administration)	Relegation to Championship
14	London Broncos (R)	27	1	0	26	438	1237	−799	2	Relegation to Championship

(C) Champions; (L) League Leaders' Shield Winners; (R) Relegated

== Squad statistics ==
Squad Number	Name	International country	Position	Previous club	Appearances	Tries	Goals	Drop Goals	Points	Notes
1	Nesiasi Mataitonga	(Tonga)	Fullback	Cronulla-Sutherland Sharks	12	1	0	0	4	
2	Kieran Dixon	(England)	Wing	London Broncos Academy	4	2	0	0	8	
3	Jordan Atkins	(Australia)	Centre	Gold Coast Titans	14	4	0	0	16	
4	Thomas Minns	(England)	Centre	Leeds Rhinos	24	6	0	0	24	loan
5	James Duckworth	(England)	Wing	Leeds Rhinos	3	0	0	0	0	loan
6	Ben Farrar	(Australia)	Centre	Manly Warringah Sea Eagles	23	1	0	0	4	
7	Josh Drinkwater	(Germany)	Scrum-half	St. George Illawarra Dragons	25	5	58	0	136	
8	Atelea Vea	(Tonga)	Prop	St. George Illawarra Dragons	23	2	0	0	8	
9	Scott Moore	(England)	Hooker	North Queensland Cowboys	27	3	0	0	12	
10	Olsi Krasniqi	(Albania)	Prop	London Broncos Academy	27	1	0	0	4	
11	Mike McMeeken	(England)	Second-row	London Broncos Academy	21	5	0	0	20	
12	Matt Cook	(England)	Second-row	Hull Kingston Rovers	28	4	0	0	16	
13	Alex Foster	(England)	Loose forward	Leeds Rhinos	21	3	0	0	12	loan
14	Mike Bishay	(England)	Scrum-half, Hooker	London Broncos Academy	11	1	2	0	8	
15	James Greenwood	(England)	Prop	Wigan Warriors	16	3	0	0	12	loan
16	Nick Slyney	(Australia)	Prop	Brisbane Broncos	25	4	0	0	16	
17	Will Lovell	(England)	Second-row	London Broncos Academy	8	1	0	0	4	
18	George Griffin	(England)	Second-row	Hull Kingston Rovers	20	1	0	0	4	
19	Erjon Dollapi	(Albania)	Prop	London Broncos Academy	8	2	0	0	8	
20	James Cunningham	(England)	Hooker	Hull F.C.	17	2	0	0	8	loan
21	Joel Wicks	(England)	Hooker	London Broncos Academy	7	0	0	0	0	
22	James Woodburn-Hall	(Jamaica)	Scrum-half, Stand-off	London Broncos Academy	5	1	0	0	4	
23	Denny Solomona	(Samoa)	Wing	Melbourne Storm	21	9	0	0	36	
24	Mason Caton-Brown	(Jamaica)	Centre, Wing	London Broncos Academy	18	12	0	0	48	
25	Iliess Macani	(England)	Wing	London Broncos Academy	14	4	0	0	16	
26	Tony Gigot	(France)	Stand-off	Cronulla-Sutherland Sharks	2	0	4	0	8	
27	Jamie O'Callaghan	(Ireland)	Centre, Wing	London Skolars	13	1	0	0	4	
28	Carl Forster	(England)	Prop	St Helen	5	0	0	0	0	loan
29	Harvey Burnett	(Scotland)	Centre	London Broncos Academy	0	0	0	0	0	
30	Jonathan Wallace	(Malta)	Prop	London Broncos Academy	16	0	0	0	0	
31	Maxime Hérold	(France)	Prop	Limoux Grizzlies	2	0	0	0	0	
32	Toby Everett	(England)	Prop	London Broncos Academy	2	0	0	0	0	
33	Joe Keyes	(Ireland)	Scrum-half, Stand-off	London Broncos Academy	7	5	0	0	20	
34	Oscar Thomas	(Scotland)	Stand-off	London Broncos Academy	6	0	1	0	2	
35	Alex Walker	(Scotland)	Fullback	London Broncos Academy	1	0	0	0	0	
