= 2014 Super League season =

British rugby league season

Super League XIX
- League: Super League
- Duration: 27 Rounds
- Teams: 14
- Highest attendance: 20,265; Wigan Warriors v Leeds Rhinos (5 September)
- Lowest attendance: 1,002; London Broncos v Catalans Dragons (17 April)
- Average attendance: 8,365
- Broadcast partners: Sky Sports; BBC Sport; Eurosport beIN Sports; Fox Soccer Plus; Sport Klub

2014 season
- Champions: St. Helens; 6th Super League title 13th British title
- League Leaders: St. Helens
- Runners-up: Wigan Warriors
- Biggest home win: Widnes Vikings 64-10 London Broncos (16 February)
- Biggest away win: Bradford Bulls 18-66 Huddersfield Giants (16 March)
- Man of Steel: (England) Daryl Clark
- Top point-scorer: (England) Marc Sneyd (224)
- Top try-scorer: (Australia) Joel Monaghan (28)

Promotion and relegation
- Relegated to Championship: London Broncos; Bradford Bulls

The First Utility Super League XIX was the official name for the 2014 Super League season. Fourteen teams competed over 27 rounds, after which the 8 highest finishing teams entered the play-offs to compete for a place in the Grand Final and a chance to win the championship and the Super League Trophy.

== Teams ==
Super League XIX will be the third and final year of a licensed Super League. Under this system, promotion and relegation between Super League and Championship was abolished, and 14 teams were granted licences subject to certain criteria. For the 2014 season, all fourteen teams from the previous season will compete, although Salford have changed their names from the City Reds to the Red Devils.

At the end of the season, Super League will be reduced to 12 teams, as part of the re-structuring of Super League and the RFL Championship.

Geographically, the vast majority of teams in Super League are based in the north of England, five teams – Warrington, St. Helens, Salford, Wigan and Widnes – to the west of the Pennines in Cheshire, Greater Manchester and Merseyside, and seven teams to the east in Yorkshire – Huddersfield, Bradford, Wakefield Trinity, Leeds, Castleford, Hull F.C. and Hull Kingston Rovers. Catalans Dragons are the only team based in France and are outside of the UK and London Broncos are the only team to be based in a capital city (London).

Team	Stadium	Capacity	City/Area
Bradford Bulls (2014 season)	Provident Stadium	27,000	Bradford, West Yorkshire
Castleford Tigers (2014 season)	The Wish Communications Stadium	11,750	Castleford, West Yorkshire
Catalans Dragons (2014 season)	Stade Gilbert Brutus	14,000	Perpignan, Pyrénées-Orientales, France
Huddersfield Giants (2014 season)	John Smith's Stadium	24,544	Huddersfield, West Yorkshire
Hull F.C. (2014 season)	Kingston Communications Stadium	25,404	Kingston upon Hull, East Riding of Yorkshire
Hull Kingston Rovers (2014 season)	Craven Park	9,471	Kingston upon Hull, East Riding of Yorkshire
Leeds Rhinos (2014 season)	Headingley Carnegie Stadium	22,250	Leeds, West Yorkshire
London Broncos (2014 season)	The Hive Stadium	5,176	Edgware, London
Salford Red Devils (2014 season)	AJ Bell Stadium	12,000	Salford, Greater Manchester
St Helens R.F.C. (2014 season)	Langtree Park	18,000	St. Helens, Merseyside
Wakefield Trinity Wildcats (2014 season)	Rapid Solicitors Stadium	11,000	Wakefield, West Yorkshire
Warrington Wolves (2014 season)	Halliwell Jones Stadium	15,500	Warrington, Cheshire
Widnes Vikings (2014 season)	Select Security Stadium	13,500	Widnes, Cheshire, England
Wigan Warriors (2014 season)	DW Stadium	25,138	Wigan, Greater Manchester

Legend
Reigning Super League champions
Defending Challenge Cup Champions
Relegated

== Results ==
The regular league season sees the 14 teams play each other twice (one home, one away) plus an additional match, as part of the Magic Weekend, over 27 matches. The team who finishes 1st at the end of the regular season win the League Leaders' Shield.

== Table ==
Super League XIX
Pos	Team	Pld	W	D	L	PF	PA	PD	Pts	Qualification
1	St Helens (L, C)	27	19	0	8	796	563	+233	38	Play-offs
2	Wigan Warriors	27	18	1	8	834	429	+405	37	Play-offs
3	Huddersfield Giants	27	17	3	7	785	626	+159	37	Play-offs
4	Castleford Tigers	27	17	2	8	814	583	+231	36	Play-offs
5	Warrington Wolves	27	17	1	9	793	515	+278	35	Play-offs
6	Leeds Rhinos	27	15	2	10	685	421	+264	32	Play-offs
7	Catalans Dragons	27	14	1	12	733	667	+66	29	Play-offs
8	Widnes Vikings	27	13	1	13	611	725	−114	27	Play-offs
9	Hull Kingston Rovers	27	10	3	14	627	665	−38	23	
10	Salford Red Devils	27	11	1	15	608	695	−87	23	
11	Hull F.C.	27	10	2	15	653	586	+67	22	
12	Wakefield Trinity Wildcats	27	10	1	16	557	750	−193	21	
13	Bradford Bulls (R)	27	8	0	19	512	984	−472	10 (Note: Bradford Bulls deducted 6 points on 25 February 2014 for entering administration)	Relegation to Championship
14	London Broncos (R)	27	1	0	26	438	1237	−799	2	Relegation to Championship

(C) Champions; (L) League Leaders' Shield Winners; (R) Relegated

== Play-offs ==
#	Home	Score	Away	Match Information
#	Home	Score	Away	Date and Time (Local)	Venue	Referee	Attendance
QUALIFYING AND ELIMINATION FINALS
Q1	Wigan Warriors	57 – 4	Huddersfield Giants	18 September 2014, 20:00 BST	DW Stadium	Richard Silverwood	8,562
Q2	St Helens R.F.C.	41 – 0	Castleford Tigers	19 September 2014, 20:00 BST	Langtree Park	James Child	7,458
E1	Warrington Wolves	22 – 19	Widnes Vikings	20 September 2014, 14:45 BST	Halliwell Jones Stadium	Ben Thaler	7,229
E2	Leeds Rhinos	20 – 24	Catalans Dragons	20 September 2014, 17:15 BST	Headingley Carnegie Stadium	Phil Bentham	7,112
PRELIMINARY SEMI-FINALS
P1	Castleford Tigers	14 – 30	Warrington Wolves	25 September 2014, 20:00 BST	Wish Communications Stadium	Phil Bentham	6,219
P2	Huddersfield Giants	16 – 18	Catalans Dragons	26 September 2014, 20:00 BST	John Smith's Stadium	James Child	6,900
SEMI-FINALS
SF1	St Helens R.F.C.	30 – 12	Catalans Dragons	2 October 2014, 20:00 BST	Langtree Park	Richard Silverwood	8,888
SF2	Wigan Warriors	16 – 12	Warrington Wolves	3 October 2014, 20:00 BST	DW Stadium	Phil Bentham	15,023
GRAND FINAL
F	St Helens R.F.C.	14 – 6	Wigan Warriors	11 October, 18:00 BST	Old Trafford, Manchester	Phil Bentham	70,102

== Player statistics ==
As of 14 September 2014

=== Top try-scorers ===
Rank	Player	Club	Tries
1	(Australia) Joel Monaghan	Warrington Wolves	28
2	(France) Morgan Escaré	Catalans Dragons	27
3	(England) Thomas Makinson	St Helens R.F.C.	25
4=	(Tonga) Michael Oldfield	Catalans Dragons	20
4=	(England) Jermaine McGillvary	Huddersfield Giants	20
6	(England) Josh Charnley	Wigan Warriors	19
7	(England) Elliott Whitehead	Catalans Dragons	18
8=	(Australia) Justin Carney	Castleford Tigers	17
8=	(England) Michael Shenton	Castleford Tigers	17
8=	(Scotland) Joe Wardle	Huddersfield Giants	17
8=	(England) Joe Burgess	Wigan Warriors	17

=== Top try assists ===
Rank	Player	Club	Assists
1	(Scotland) Danny Brough	Huddersfield Giants	31
2	(England) Marc Sneyd	Castleford Tigers	30
3=	(England) Matthew Smith	Wigan Warriors	25
3=	(England) Rangi Chase	Salford Red Devils	25
5	(England) Kevin Brown	Widnes Vikings	24
6	(Australia) Travis Burns	Hull Kingston Rovers	21
7=	(Republic of Ireland) Liam Finn	Castleford Tigers	20
7=	(England) Gareth O'Brien	Warrington Wolves	20
7=	(England) James Roby	St. Helens	20
10	(Australia) Tim Smith	Salford Red Devils	19

=== Top goalscorers ===
Rank	Player	Club	Goals
1	(England) Marc Sneyd	Castleford Tigers	99
2=	(Scotland) Danny Brough	Huddersfield Giants	96
2=	(England) Matty Smith	Wigan Warriors	96
4	(Australia) Travis Burns	Hull Kingston Rovers	78
5	(England) Kevin Sinfield	Leeds Rhinos	74
5	(England) Danny Tickle	Widnes Vikings	74

=== Top points scorers ===
Rank	Player	Club	Points
1	(England) Marc Sneyd	Castleford Tigers	224
2	(England) Matty Smith	Wigan Warriors	214
3	(Scotland) Danny Brough	Huddersfield Giants	208
4	(England) Chris Bridge	Widnes Vikings	178
5	(Australia) Travis Burns	Hull Kingston Rovers	170

=== Discipline ===
==== Red Cards ====
Rank	Player	Club	Red card
1=	Jason Crookes	Hull F.C.	1
1=	Scott Moore	London Broncos	1
1=	Kevin Sinfield	Leeds Rhinos	1
1=	Joel Moon	Leeds Rhinos	1
1=	Alex Walmsley	St. Helens	1
1=	Lama Tasi	Salford Red Devils	1
1=	Ben Flower	Wigan Warriors	1

==== Yellow Cards ====
Rank	Player	Club	Yellow card
1=	Justin Carney	Castleford Tigers	2
1=	Travis Burns	Hull Kingston Rovers	2
2=	Liam Finn	Castleford Tigers	1
2=	Richard Mathers	Wakefield Trinity Wildcats	1
2=	Joe Wardle	Huddersfield Giants	1
2=	Ben Flower	Wigan Warriors	1
2=	John Bateman	Wigan Warriors	1
2=	Jamie Shaul	Hull F.C.	1
2=	Denny Solomona	London Broncos	1
2=	Scott Wheeldon	Castleford Tigers	1
2=	Gene Ormsby	Warrington Wolves	1
2=	Éloi Pélissier	Catalans Dragons	1
2=	Alex Walmsley	St. Helens	1
2=	Richard Whiting	Hull F.C.	1
2=	Liam Farrell	Wigan Warriors	1
2=	Gareth Hock	Salford Red Devils	1
2=	Benjamin Garcia	Catalans Dragons	1
2=	Adam Sidlow	Bradford Bulls	1
2=	Ryan Bailey	Leeds Rhinos	1
2=	Chris Riley	Wakefield Trinity Wildcats	1
2=	Paul Wood	Warrington Wolves	1
2=	Michael McIlorum	Wigan Warriors	1
2=	Danny Brough	Huddersfield Giants	1
2=	Adam Milner	Castleford Tigers	1
2=	Eddy Pettybourne	Wigan Warriors	1
2=	Chris Dean	Widnes Vikings	1
2=	Vincent Duport	Catalans Dragons	1
2=	Paddy Flynn	Widnes Vikings	1
2=	Atelea Vea	London Broncos	1
2=	Justin Poore	Hull Kingston Rovers	1
2=	Jordan Rankin	Hull F.C.	1
2=	Jason Chan	Huddersfield Giants	1
2=	Macgraff Leuluai	Widnes Vikings	1
2=	Richard Moore	Wakefield Trinity Wildcats	1
2=	Jason Crookes	Hull F.C.	1

== End-of-season awards ==
Awards are presented for outstanding contributions and efforts to players and clubs in the week leading up to the Super League Grand Final:

- Man of Steel: Daryl Clark, Castleford Tigers
- Coach of the year: Daryl Powell, Castleford Tigers
- Super League club of the year: Widnes Vikings
- Young player of the year: Daryl Clark, Castleford Tigers
- Foundation of the year: Warrington Wolves
- Rhino "Top Gun":
- Metre-maker: James Roby, St Helens
- Top Try Scorer: Joel Monaghan, Warrington Wolves
- Outstanding Achievement Award:
- Hit Man:

== 2014 Transfers ==
=== Players ===
Player	2013 Club	2014 Club
John Bateman	Bradford Bulls	Wigan Warriors
Jamie Langley	Bradford Bulls	Hull Kingston Rovers
Heath L'Estrange	Bradford Bulls	NRL: Sydney Roosters
Keith Lulia	Bradford Bulls	NRL: Wests Tigers
Jarrod Sammut	Bradford Bulls	Wakefield Trinity Wildcats
Rangi Chase	Castleford Tigers	Salford Red Devils
Lee Gilmour	Castleford Tigers	Wakefield Trinity Wildcats
Jordan Thompson	Castleford Tigers	Hull F.C.
Rémi Casty	Catalans Dragons	NRL: Sydney Roosters
Steve Menzies	Catalans Dragons	Retirement
Dale Ferguson	Huddersfield Giants	Bradford Bulls
Stuart Fielden	Huddersfield Giants	Retirement
Luke George	Huddersfield Giants	Bradford Bulls
Tom Briscoe	Hull F.C.	Leeds Rhinos
Ben Galea	Hull F.C.	Retirement
Daniel Holdsworth	Hull F.C.	NRL: Cronulla-Sutherland Sharks
Paul Johnson	Hull F.C.	Widnes Vikings
Andy Lynch	Hull F.C.	Castleford Tigers
Shannon McDonnell	Hull F.C.	St. Helens
Mark O'Meley	Hull F.C.	Retirement
Danny Tickle	Hull F.C.	Widnes Vikings
Michael Dobson	Hull Kingston Rovers	NRL: Newcastle Knights
Mickey Paea	Hull Kingston Rovers	Hull F.C.
Cory Paterson	Hull Kingston Rovers	NRL: Wests Tigers
Lincoln Withers	Hull Kingston Rovers	Retirement
Paul McShane	Leeds Rhinos	Wakefield Trinity Wildcats
Chris Bailey	London Broncos	Huddersfield Giants
Mark Bryant	London Broncos	Retirement
Tony Clubb	London Broncos	Wigan Warriors
Luke Dorn	London Broncos	Castleford Tigers
Ben Fisher	London Broncos	Retirement
Tommy Lee	London Broncos	Salford Red Devils
Chad Randall	London Broncos	Retirement
Dan Sarginson	London Broncos	Wigan Warriors
Jamie Soward	London Broncos	NRL: Penrith Panthers
Scott Wheeldon	London Broncos	Castleford Tigers
Michael Witt	London Broncos	NRL: St. George Illawarra Dragons
Jodie Broughton	Salford City Reds	Huddersfield Giants
Lee Gaskell	Salford City Reds	Bradford Bulls
Ashley Gibson	Salford City Reds	Castleford Tigers
Marc Sneyd	Salford City Reds	Castleford Tigers
Paul Clough	St. Helens	Widnes Vikings
Ade Gardner	St. Helens	Hull Kingston Rovers
Francis Meli	St. Helens	Salford Red Devils
Josh Perry	St. Helens	Retirement
Tony Puletua	St. Helens	Salford Red Devils
Paul Aiton	Wakefield Trinity Wildcats	Leeds Rhinos
Kyle Amor	Wakefield Trinity Wildcats	St. Helens
Ben Cockayne	Wakefield Trinity Wildcats	Hull Kingston Rovers
Frankie Mariano	Wakefield Trinity Wildcats	Castleford Tigers
Justin Poore	Wakefield Trinity Wildcats	Hull Kingston Rovers
Kyle Wood	Wakefield Trinity Wildcats	Huddersfield Giants
Lee Briers	Warrington Wolves	Retirement
Mike Cooper	Warrington Wolves	NRL: St. George Illawarra Dragons
Brett Hodgson	Warrington Wolves	Retirement
Adrian Morley	Warrington Wolves	Salford Red Devils
Ben Cross	Widnes Vikings	Retirement
Gareth Hock	Widnes Vikings	Salford Red Devils
Harrison Hansen	Wigan Warriors	Salford Red Devils
Lee Mossop	Wigan Warriors	NRL: Parramatta Eels
Pat Richards	Wigan Warriors	NRL: Wests Tigers
Sam Tomkins	Wigan Warriors	NRL: New Zealand Warriors
Chris Tuson	Wigan Warriors	Hull F.C.
Scott Anderson	NRL: Brisbane Broncos	Wakefield Trinity Wildcats
Lama Tasi	NRL: Brisbane Broncos	Salford Red Devils
Kris Keating	NRL: Canterbury-Bankstown Bulldogs	Hull Kingston Rovers
Ben Pomeroy	NRL: Cronulla-Sutherland Sharks	Catalans Dragons
Jordan Atkins	NRL: Gold Coast Titans	London Broncos
Junior Sa'u	NRL: Melbourne Storm	Salford Red Devils
Neville Costigan	NRL: Newcastle Knights	Hull Kingston Rovers
Kevin Locke	NRL: New Zealand Warriors	Salford Red Devils
Steve Rapira	NRL: New Zealand Warriors	Salford Red Devils
Matt Bowen	NRL: North Queensland Cowboys	Wigan Warriors
Scott Moore	NRL: North Queensland Cowboys	London Broncos
Matt Ryan	NRL: Parramatta Eels	Wakefield Trinity Wildcats
Mose Masoe	NRL: Penrith Panthers	St. Helens
Luke Walsh	NRL: Penrith Panthers	St. Helens
Roy Asotasi	NRL: South Sydney Rabbitohs	Warrington Wolves
Jeff Lima	NRL: South Sydney Rabbitohs	Catalans Dragons
Michael Weyman	NRL: St. George Illawarra Dragons	Hull Kingston Rovers
Michael Oldfield	NRL: Sydney Roosters	Catalans Dragons
Eddy Pettybourne	NRL: Wests Tigers	Wigan Warriors
Setaimata Sa	London Irish (Premiership Rugby)	Hull F.C.
Ben Farrar	N/A	London Broncos
Danny Galea	N/A	Widnes Vikings
Fetuli Talanoa	N/A	Hull F.C.

== Media ==
=== Television ===
2014 is the third year of a five-year contract with Sky Sports to televise 70 matches per season. The deal which runs until 2016 is worth £90million.

Sky Sports coverage in the UK see two live matches broadcast each week, which will usually be shown at 20:00 on Thursday and Friday nights with the Thursday night fixtures first being adopted at the back-end of the 2013 season.

Regular commentators were Eddie Hemmings and Mike Stephenson with summarisers including Phil Clarke, Brian Carney, Barrie McDermott and Terry O'Connor. Sky will broadcast highlights on Sunday Nights on Super League - Full Time, usually airing at 10pm.

BBC Sport broadcast a highlights programme called the Super League Show, presented by Tanya Arnold. The BBC show two weekly broadcasts of the programme. The first is only to the BBC North West, Yorkshire & North Midlands, North East & Cumbria, and East Yorkshire & Lincolnshire regions on Monday evenings at 23:35 on BBC One, while a repeat showing is shown nationally on BBC Two on Tuesday afternoons at 13:30. The Super League Show is also available for one week after broadcast for streaming or download via the BBC iPlayer in the UK only. End of season play-offs are shown on BBC Two across the whole country in a weekly highlights package on Sunday afternoons.

Internationally, Super League is shown live or delayed on Showtime Sports (Middle East), Māori Television (New Zealand), TV 2 Sport (Norway), NTV+ (Russia), Fox Soccer Plus (United States), Eurosport (Australia) or Sportsnet World (Canada).

=== Radio ===
BBC Coverage:

- BBC Radio 5 Live Sports Extra (National DAB Digital Radio) will carry two Super League commentaries each week on Thursday and Friday nights (both kick off 8pm); this will be through the 5 Live Rugby league programme which is presented by Dave Woods with a guest summariser (usually a Super League player or coach) and also includes interviews and debate..
- BBC Radio Humberside will have full match commentary of all Hull KR and Hull matches.
- BBC Radio Leeds carry commentaries featuring Bradford, Leeds, Castleford, Wakefield and Huddersfield.
- BBC Radio Manchester will carry commentary of Wigan and Salford whilst sharing commentary of Warrington with BBC Radio Merseyside.
- BBC Radio Merseyside (will have commentary on St Helens and Widnes matches whilst sharing commentary of Warrington with BBC Radio Manchester.

Commercial Radio Coverage:

- 102.4 Wish FM will carry commentaries of Wigan & St Helens matches.
- 107.2 Wire FM will carry commentaries on Warrington Home and Away.
- BCB 106.6 (Bradford Community Broadcasting) have full match commentary of Bradford Bulls home and away.
- Radio Yorkshire will launch in March carrying Super League commentaries.
- Radio Warrington (Online Station) all Warrington home games and some away games.
- Grand Sud FM covers every Catalans Dragons Home Match (in French).
- Radio France Bleu Roussillon covers every Catalans Dragons Away Match (in French).

All Super League commentaries on any station are available via the particular stations on-line streaming.
