= Olsi Krasniqi =

Albanian rugby league footballer

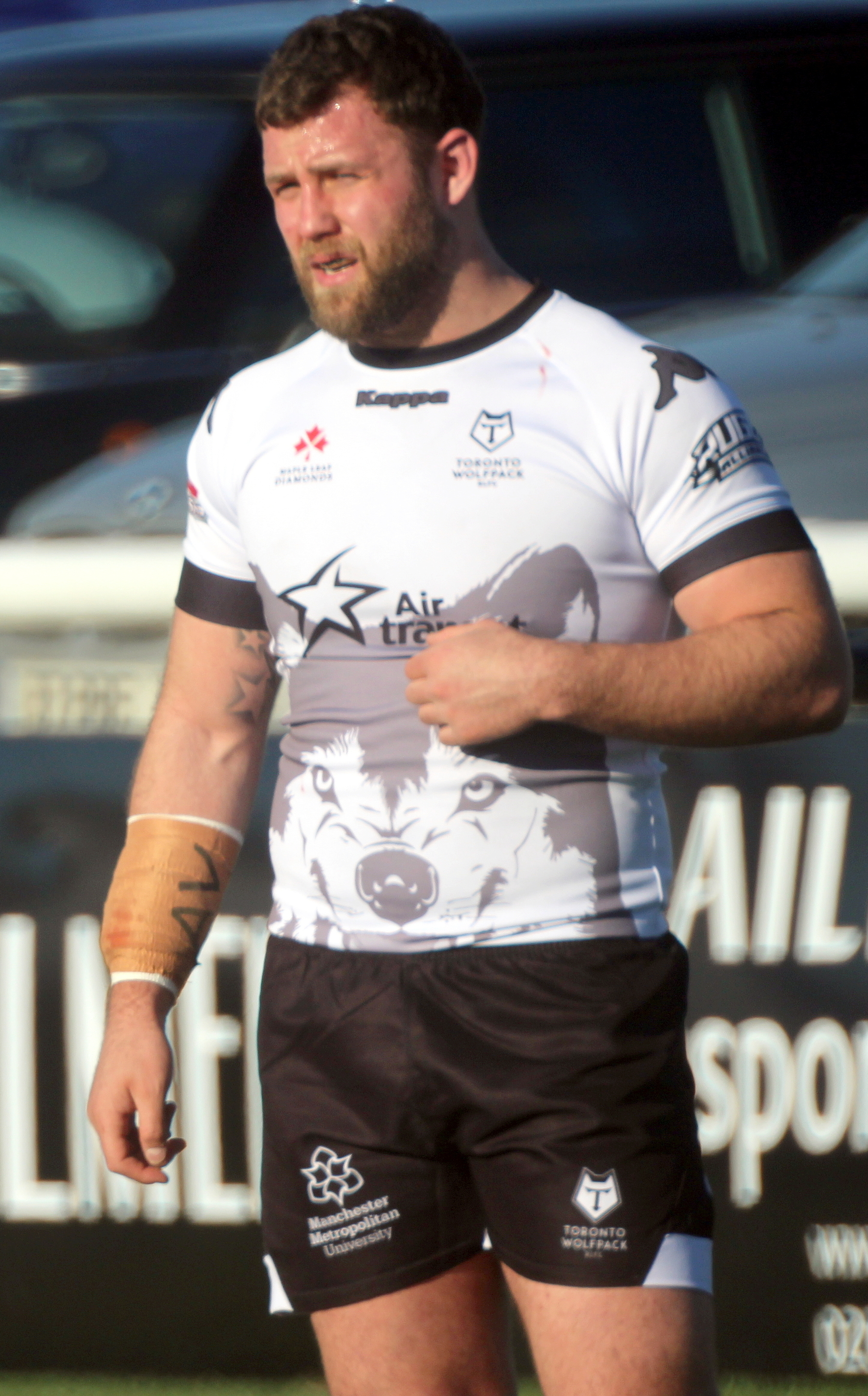

Personal information
- Born: 28 June 1992 (age 33) Tirana, Albania
- Height: 5 ft 11 in (1.80 m)
- Weight: 16 st 3 lb (103 kg)

Playing information
- Position: Prop, Loose forward
Club
Years	Team	Pld	T	G	FG	P
2010–14	London Broncos	92	4	0	0	16
2012(DR)	→ London Skolars	1	0	0	0	0
2013(DR)	→ London Skolars	2	0	0	0	0
2015–17	Salford Red Devils	55	2	0	0	0
2016(DR)	→ N Wales Crusaders	3	0	0	0	0
2018–19	Toronto Wolfpack	20	2	0	0	8
2019(loan)	→ Bradford Bulls	2	0	0	0	0
2019–21	London Broncos	18	0	0	0	0
	Total	193	8	0	0	24
- Source: As of 19 February 2026

Olsi Krasniqi (born 28 June 1992) is an Albanian former professional rugby league footballer who last played as a prop for the London Broncos in the Championship.

He previously played for Harlequins Rugby League in the Super League, and on loan from London at the London Skolars in League 1. Krasniqi played for the Salford Red Devils in the Super League, and on loan from Salford at the North Wales Crusaders in Kingstone Press League 1. He also played for the Toronto Wolfpack in the Championship, and on loan from Toronto at the Bradford Bulls in the Championship.

== Background ==
Krasniqi was born in Tirana, Albania; after his family moved to England he grew up in Feltham, London. His father is a professional wrestler from Albania.

== Career ==
=== Harlequins RL / London Broncos ===
He made his first team début as a 17-year-old for Harlequins RL in 2010's Super League XV; coming off the interchange bench to score a try on début in a 50–22 win over Crusaders RL.

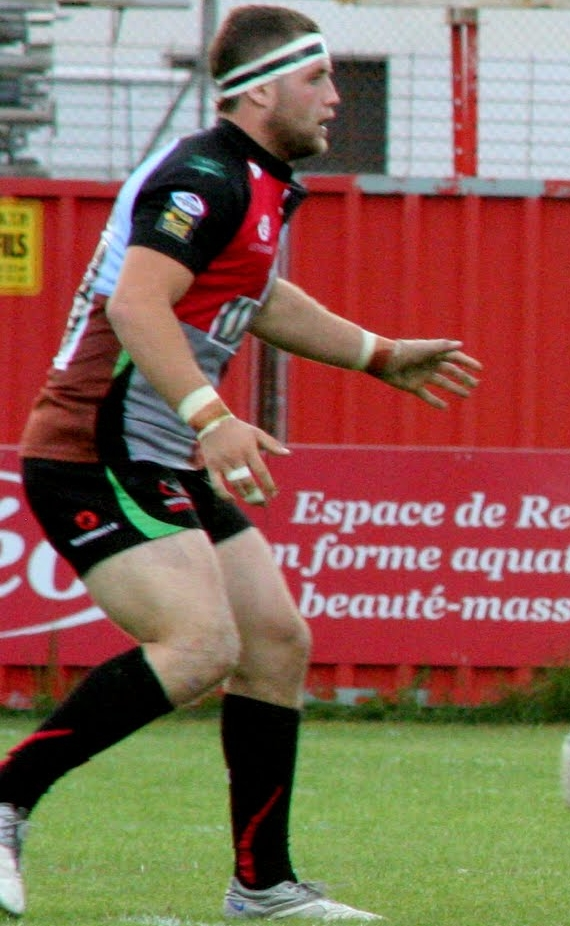
Krasniqi playing for Harlequins RL against the Catalans Dragons in 2010

He spent time on loan from the Broncos at the London Skolars in League 1 in 2012 and 2013.

=== Salford Red Devils ===
Krasniqi joined the Salford Red Devils ahead of the 2015 Super League season.

He spent time on loan from Salford at the North Wales Crusaders in Kingstone Press League 1.

=== Toronto Wolfpack ===
He joined the Toronto Wolfpack ahead of the 2018 RFL Championship season.

Krasniqi also spent time on loan from Toronto at the Bradford Bulls in the Betfred Championship.

=== London Broncos ===
Krasniqi left the Wolfpack to return to the London Broncos part way through the 2019 Super League season.

He retired in 2021 due to concussion injuries.

== Club statistics ==
Year	Club	Competition	Appearances	Tries	Goals	Drop goals	Points
2010	Harlequins RL	Super League	10	1	0	0	4
2011	Harlequins RL	Super League	15	0	0	0	0
2012	London Broncos	Super League	17	2	0	0	8
2012	London Skolars	Championship 1	1	0	0	0	0
2013	London Broncos	Super League	23	0	0	0	0
2013	London Skolars	Championship 1	2	0	0	0	0
2014	London Broncos	Super League	27	1	0	0	4
2015	Salford Red Devils	Super League	9	0	0	0	0
2016	Salford Red Devils	Super League	19	1	0	0	0
2016	North Wales Crusaders	League 1	3	0	0	0	0
2017	Salford Red Devils	Super League	27	1	0	0	4
2018	Toronto Wolfpack	Championship	19	2	0	0	8
2019	Toronto Wolfpack	Championship	1	0	0	0	0
2019	Bradford Bulls	Championship	2	0	0	0	0
2019	London Broncos	Super League	9	0	0	0	0
2020	London Broncos	Championship	6	0	0	0	0
2021	London Broncos	Championship	3	0	0	0	0
Club career total			193	8	0	0	32
