= Will Lovell =

English rugby league footballer

Personal information
- Full name: William Lovell
- Born: 10 May 1993 (age 33) Northampton, Northamptonshire, England

Playing information
- Height: 6 ft 4 in (1.93 m)
- Weight: 16 st 10 lb (106 kg)
- Position: Second-row, Centre
Club
| Years | Team | Pld | T | G | FG | P |
|---|---|---|---|---|---|---|
| 2012–14 | London Broncos | 33 | 4 | 0 | 0 | 16 |
| 2013(loan) | → London Skolars | 1 | 1 | 0 | 0 | 4 |
| 2014(loan) | → London Skolars | 8 | 4 | 0 | 0 | 16 |
| 2015–16 | London Skolars | 43 | 6 | 0 | 0 | 24 |
| 2017 | London Broncos | 0 | 0 | 0 | 0 | 0 |
| 2018–26 | London Broncos | 177 | 20 | 0 | 0 | 80 |
| | Total | 262 | 35 | 0 | 0 | 140 |

Will Lovell (born 10 May 1993) is a professional rugby league coach who is the head coach of the London Broncos Reserves in the Super League Reserves competition.

He is a former professional rugby league footballer who last played as a second-row forward for the London Broncos in the Betfred Championship. Lovell played for the Broncos in the Super League between 2012 and 2014, and has spent time on loan from them at the London Skolars in the League 1. He has also spent the 2015 and 2016 seasons at the Skolars. Earlier in his career he played as a centre.

== Background ==
Lovell was born in Northampton, Northamptonshire, England.

He was graduated from St Mary's University, Twickenham.

== Career ==
=== Early career ===
Lovell played rugby union as a youth and was in the junior system of the Northampton Saints.

He also played rugby league as an amateur for the Northampton Demons and from there progressed through to the London Broncos Academy system in 2010 and 2011.

=== London Broncos ===
Lovell made his Super League debut for the London Broncos against the Catalans Dragons at the Etihad Stadium in May 2012.

He played one game on loan at the London Skolars in the League 1 in 2013.

He spent time on loan from the Broncos at the Skolars in the League 1 in 2014.

=== London Skolars ===
Lovell joined the London Skolars ahead of the 2015 Championship 1 season. He spent two seasons at White Hart Lane Community Sports Centre, featuring prominently in both 2015 and 2016.

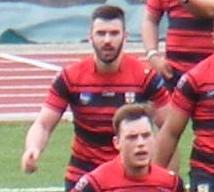
Lovell playing for the London Skolars in 2015

=== Return to the Broncos ===
After a successful spell in North London, Lovell stepped up a division and signed a three-month deal with his former club ahead of the 2017 season. He was injured and took on a community role in lieu of his playing contract being extended.

He returned to the club as a player ahead of the 2018 season, playing mainly as a second-row forward. He played a pivotal role in the Broncos' successful 2018 season, the culmination of which was their 4-2 win over the Toronto Wolfpack in the Million Pound Game to earn promotion to Super League in 2019.

Following the clubs relegation from the Super League Lovell was named captain of the club ahead of the 2020 season, and also returned to playing as a centre.

In June 2022 Lovell suffered a suspected fractured neck against Workington Town at Derwent Park. He was stretchered off and then rushed to hospital in an ambulance. He missed only one match, with the injury not being as bad as initially feared.

On 15 October 2023, Lovell played in the London Broncos upset Million Pound Game victory over Toulouse Olympique.

Lovell's long-held role as captain was handed to newcomer Reagan Campbell-Gillard ahead of the 2026 RFL Championship season.

On 15 March 2026 he played his 200th career game for the London Broncos, in their 1895 Cup Preliminary Round victory over the Barrow Raiders at Richmond's Athletic Ground.

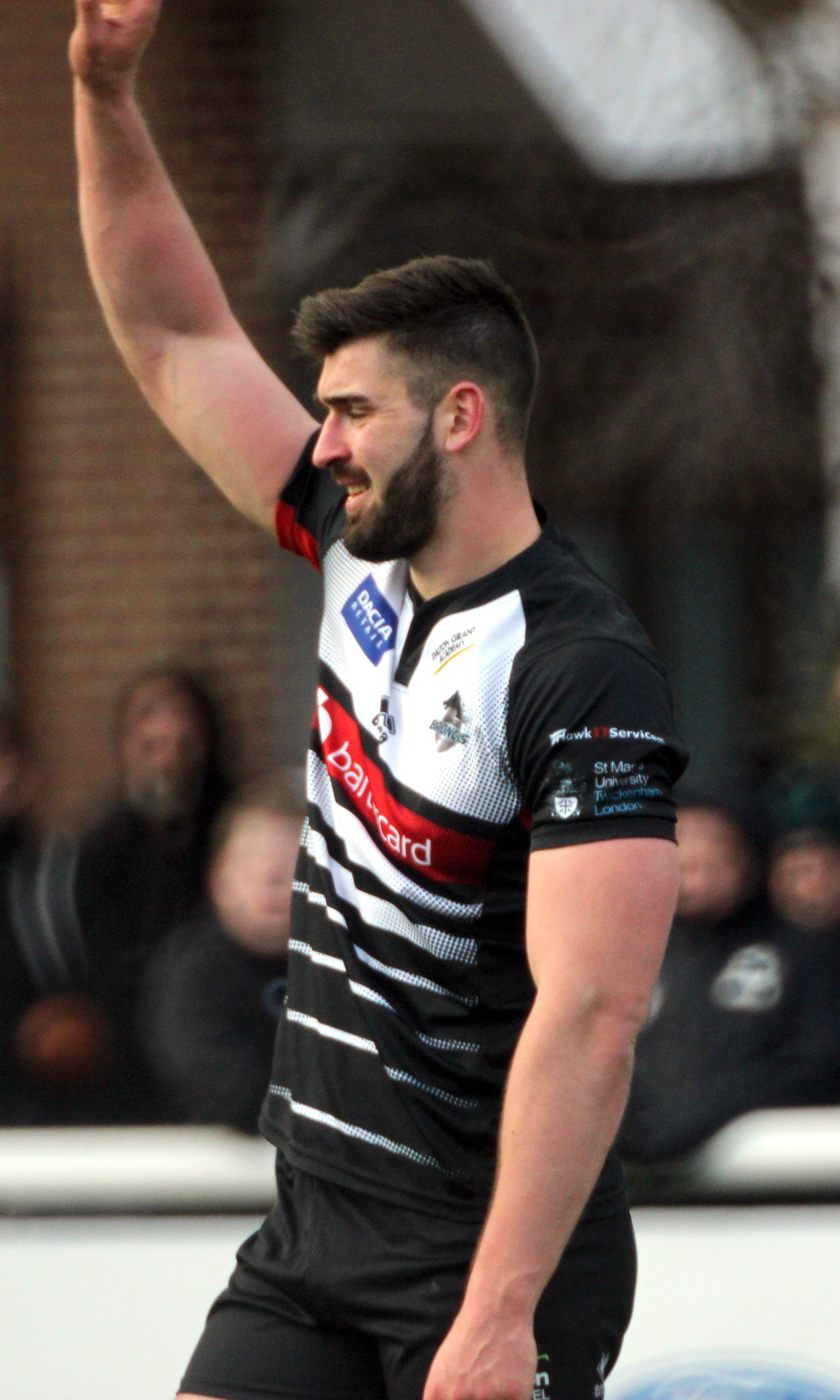
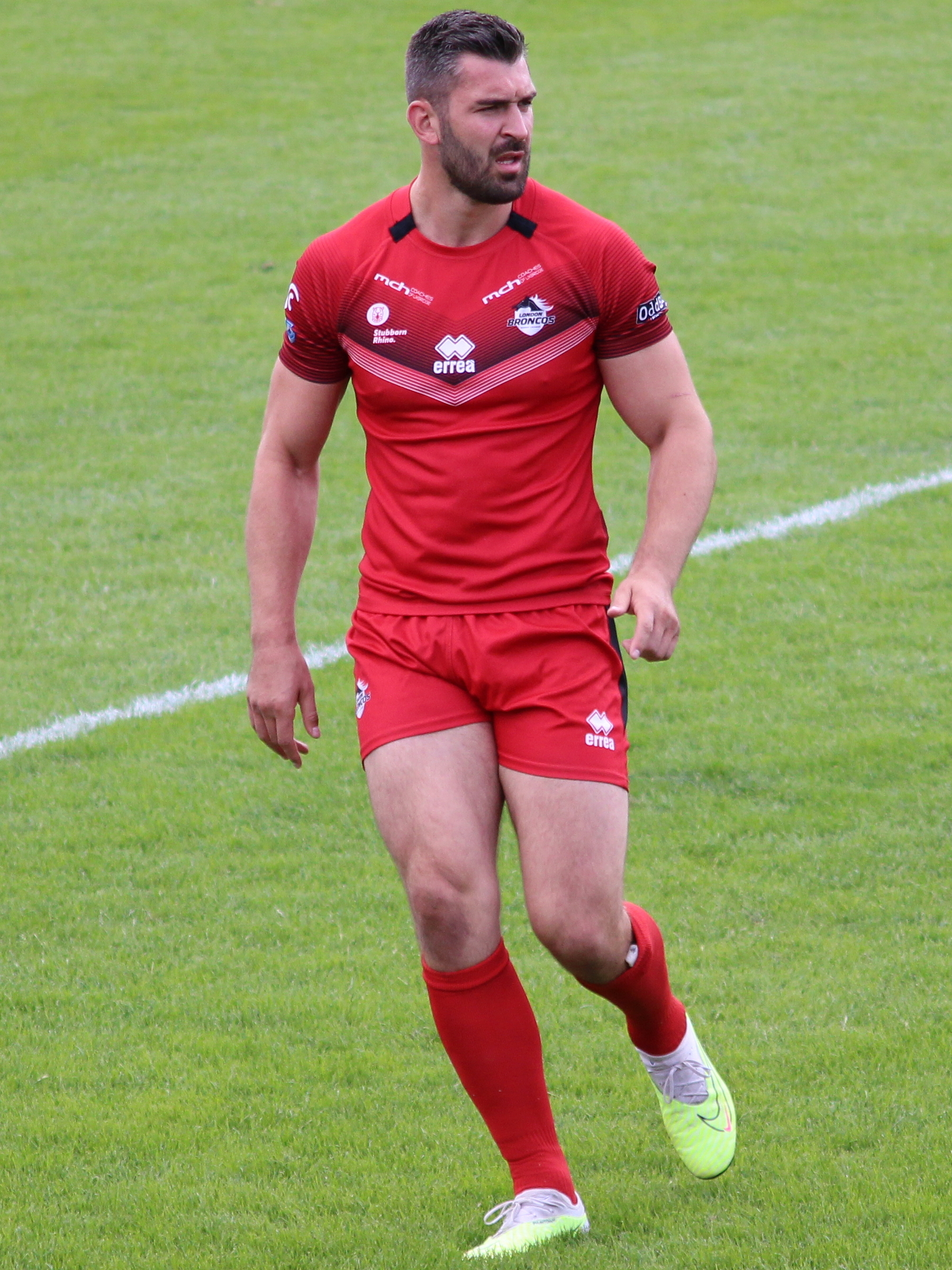
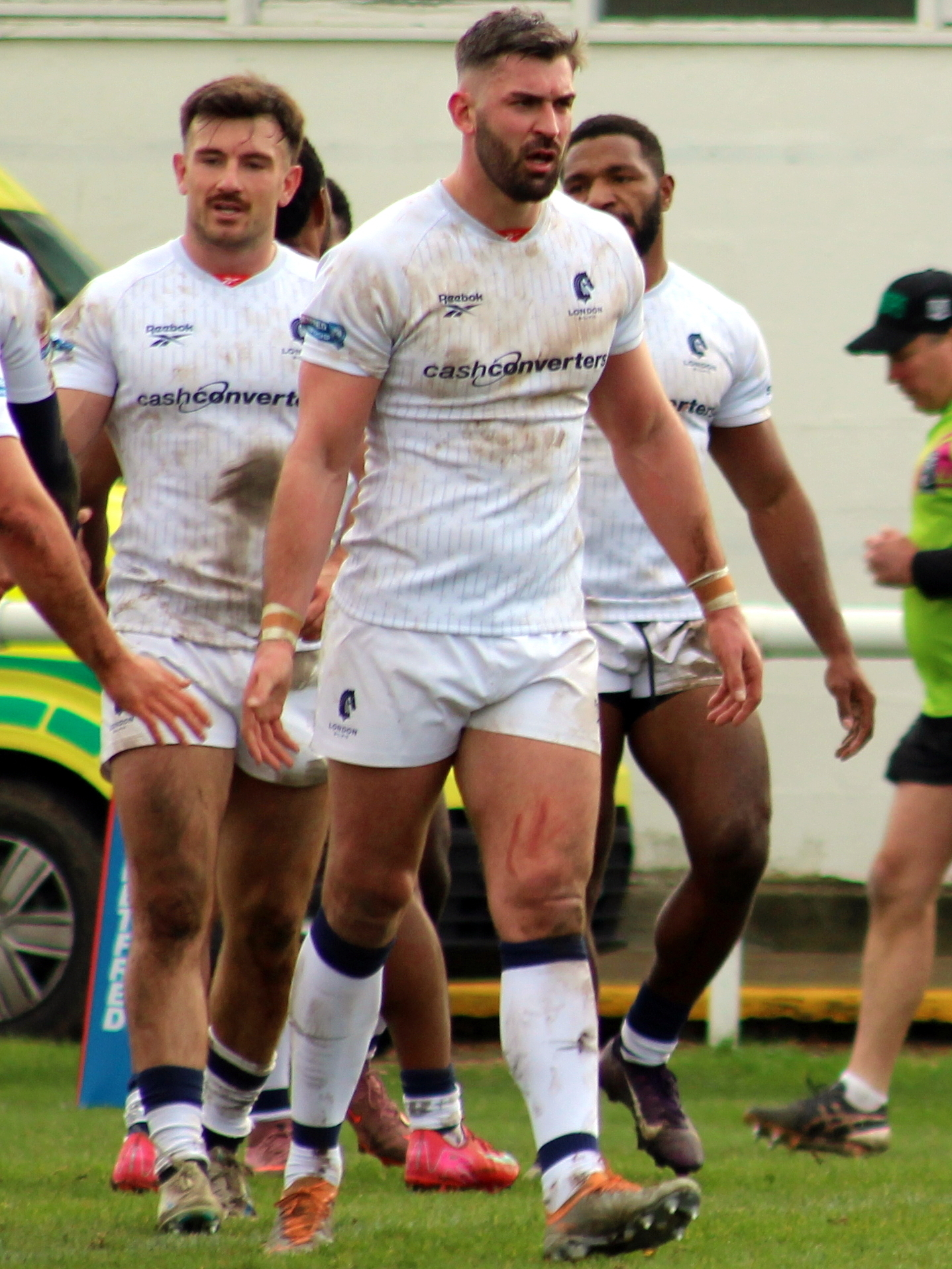
Will Lovell in action for the London Broncos

In August 2026, he was part of the Broncos squad that lifted the RFL Championship Leaders' Shield.

In 2026 he was part of the London Broncos squad that secured their historic treble of League Leaders' Shield, 1895 Cup and Grand Final victories.

Lovell announced his retirement in October 2026, having made a club record 210 appearances for the Broncos.

== Club statistics ==
| Year | Club | League Competition | Appearances | Tries | Goals | Drop goals | Points | Notes |
|---|---|---|---|---|---|---|---|---|
| 2012 | London Broncos | 2012 Super League | 10 | 3 | 0 | 0 | 12 | |
| 2013 | London Broncos | 2013 Super League | 15 | 0 | 0 | 0 | 0 | |
| 2013 | → London Skolars | 2013 Championship 1 | 1 | 1 | 0 | 0 | 4 | loan |
| 2014 | London Broncos | 2014 Super League | 8 | 1 | 0 | 0 | 4 | |
| 2014 | → London Skolars | 2014 Championship 1 | 8 | 4 | 0 | 0 | 16 | loan |
| 2015 | London Skolars | 2015 Championship 1 | 22 | 3 | 0 | 0 | 12 | |
| 2016 | London Skolars | 2016 League 1 | 21 | 3 | 0 | 0 | 12 | |
| 2017 | London Broncos | 2017 RFL Championship | 0 | 0 | 0 | 0 | 0 | |
| 2018 | London Broncos | 2018 RFL Championship | 17 | 5 | 0 | 0 | 20 | |
| 2019 | London Broncos | 2019 Super League | 18 | 1 | 0 | 0 | 4 | |
| 2020 | London Broncos | 2020 RFL Championship | 3 | 0 | 0 | 0 | 0 | |
| 2021 | London Broncos | 2021 RFL Championship | 19 | 3 | 0 | 0 | 12 | |
| 2022 | London Broncos | 2022 RFL Championship | 25 | 5 | 0 | 0 | 20 | |
| 2023 | London Broncos | 2023 RFL Championship | 31 | 3 | 0 | 0 | 12 | |
| 2024 | London Broncos | 2024 Super League | 27 | 1 | 0 | 0 | 4 | |
| 2025 | London Broncos | 2025 RFL Championship | 25 | 1 | 0 | 0 | 4 | |
| 2026 | London Broncos | 2026 RFL Championship | 12 | 1 | 0 | 0 | 4 | |
| Club career total | | | 262 | 35 | 0 | 0 | 140 | |

== Personal life ==
Lovell is a qualified PE teacher. He combines his rugby league training and playing duties with teaching commitments at Milbourne Lodge School.
