= Mason Caton-Brown =

Jamaica international rugby league footballer

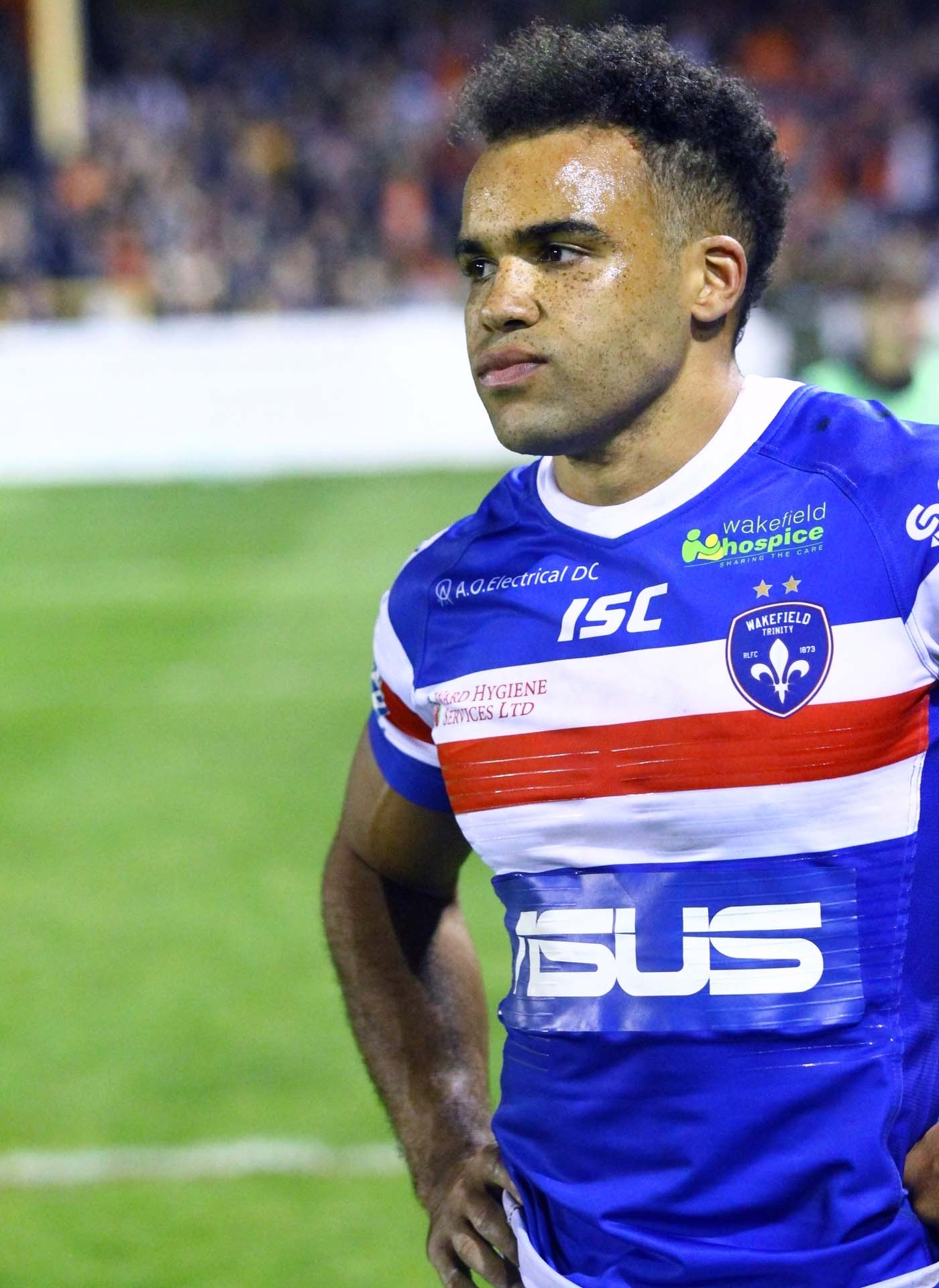

Personal information
- Full name: Mason Elliott Caton-Brown
- Born: 24 May 1993 (age 33) Enfield, London, England

Playing information
- Height: 6 ft 0 in (1.83 m)
- Weight: 14 st 0 lb (89 kg)
- Position: Centre, Wing
Club
Years	Team	Pld	T	G	FG	P
2013–14	London Broncos	20	16	0	0	64
2013(DR)	→ Hemel Stags	14	9	0	0	36
2014–16	Salford Red Devils	37	25	0	0	100
2017–18	Wakefield Trinity	27	26	0	0	104
2017(loan)	→ Dewsbury Rams	1	0	0	0	0
2018	Toronto Wolfpack	7	2	0	0	8
2019	Wakefield Trinity	10	6	0	0	24
	Total	116	84	0	0	336
Representative
Years	Team	Pld	T	G	FG	P
2019	Jamaica	1	1	0	0	4

Mason Caton-Brown (born 24 May 1993) is a former Jamaica international rugby league footballer who played as a winger or centre.

He has previously played for the London Broncos in the Super League, and on loan from the Broncos at the Hemel Stags in League 1. Caton-Brown has also played in the top flight for the Salford Red Devils, and Wakefield Trinity in two separate spells, and spent time on loan from Wakefield at the Dewsbury Rams in the Championship. He also played for the Toronto Wolfpack in the Championship.

He has also represented Jamaica in rugby sevens.

== Background ==
Caton-Brown was born in Enfield, London, England. He attended Enfield Grammar School and then went on to be a boarding pupil at Mill Hill School. Caton-Brown then studied Biochemistry at Leicester University.

He represented England Students at the age of 17; winning against Scotland under-18s and Catalans Dragons under-18s.

== Rugby League career ==
For the 2013 season, Caton-Brown played for the Hemel Stags in the Championship One after being put on dual registration to the Hemel Stags after impressive performances for the London Broncos Under-19s. He scored 9 tries in 14 appearances for the semi-professional side.

Mason Caton-Brown made his début for the London Broncos on 1 September 2013 against the Bradford Bulls after impressing (now former) head coach Tony Rea whilst playing for the Hemel Stags. He scored a try on début.

In his second game for the capital side, he scored a hat trick against Hull Kingston Rovers on 8 September 2014.

His started the 2014 Super League season by scoring 2 tries vs the Widnes Vikings. At the Magic Weekend, head coach Joe Grima confirmed that Caton-Brown has attracted many top Super League clubs despite only playing 16 first-grade games for the club (correct on 21 May 2014).

He joined the Salford Red Devils, after being signed on a 2 1/2-year deal from the London Broncos.

He left Salford to join Wakefield Trinity from the 2017 season.

Caton-Brown represented Jamaica Rugby League against England Knights at the Headingley Rugby Stadium Scoring Jamaica's only try.

In July 2019, Wakefield announced that Caton-Brown had left the club to "pursue other business interests".

== Rugby Sevens ==
He played for the Jamaica national rugby sevens team at the 2019 Hong Kong Sevens qualifier for the World Rugby Sevens Series. He also represented Jamaica at the 2019 Pan American Games.

== Business career ==
During his rugby career, Caton-Brown built an extensive property portfolio around the North West of England. In 2019 he left Wakefield Trinity to pursue other "business interests" relating to property development and e-commerce.

On 22 December 2025 it was announced that the successful bid to take over Salford Red Devils was that made by Salford RLFC Ltd, headed up by former Salford player, Mason Caton-Brown, and local businessmen Malcolm Crompton and Paul Hancock, who are the directors of the company. Membership of the RFL was reinstated allowing the club to participate in the 2026 season.

== Career stats ==
Season	Appearance	Tries	Goals	F/G	Points
2013 Hemel Stags	14	9	0	0	36
2013 London Broncos	2	4	0	0	16
2014 London Broncos	18	12	0	0	48
Total	34	25	0	0	100
