= Joel Wicks =

English rugby league footballer

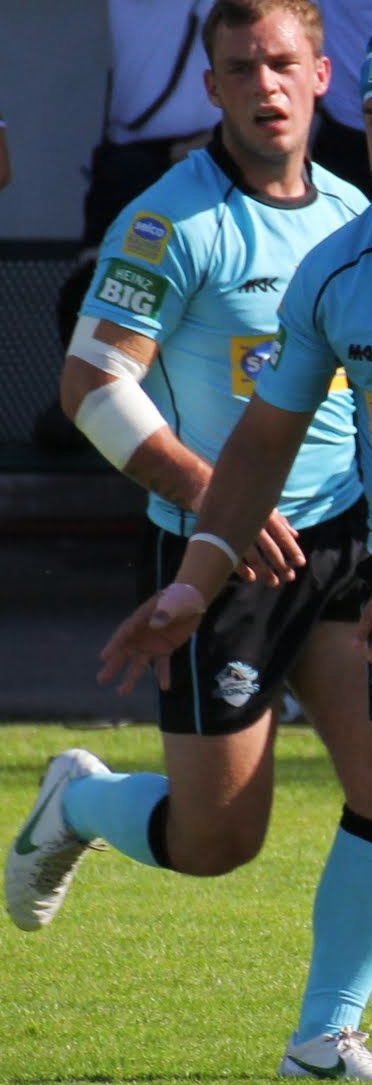

Personal information
- Born: 27 October 1994 (age 31) London, England
- Height: 5 ft 10 in (1.78 m)
- Weight: 14 st 2 lb (90 kg)

Playing information
- Position: Hooker, Centre, Second-row, Lock
Club
Years	Team	Pld	T	G	FG	P
2013–15	London Broncos	24	0	0	0	0
2015(loan)	→ London Skolars	9	1	0	0	4
	Total	33	1	0	0	4
- Source: As of 23 April 2017

Joel Wicks (born 27 October 1994) is a former professional rugby league footballer who most recently played for the London Broncos in the Championship. He played as a hooker.

Wicks started as a junior for the Greenwich Admirals and was in the London Broncos Academy system.

In 2013 he made his Super League début for the Broncos against the Wakefield Trinity Wildcats.

In 2015 Wicks played nine games on loan at the London Skolars in League 1.
