= Mike Bishay =

English rugby league footballer

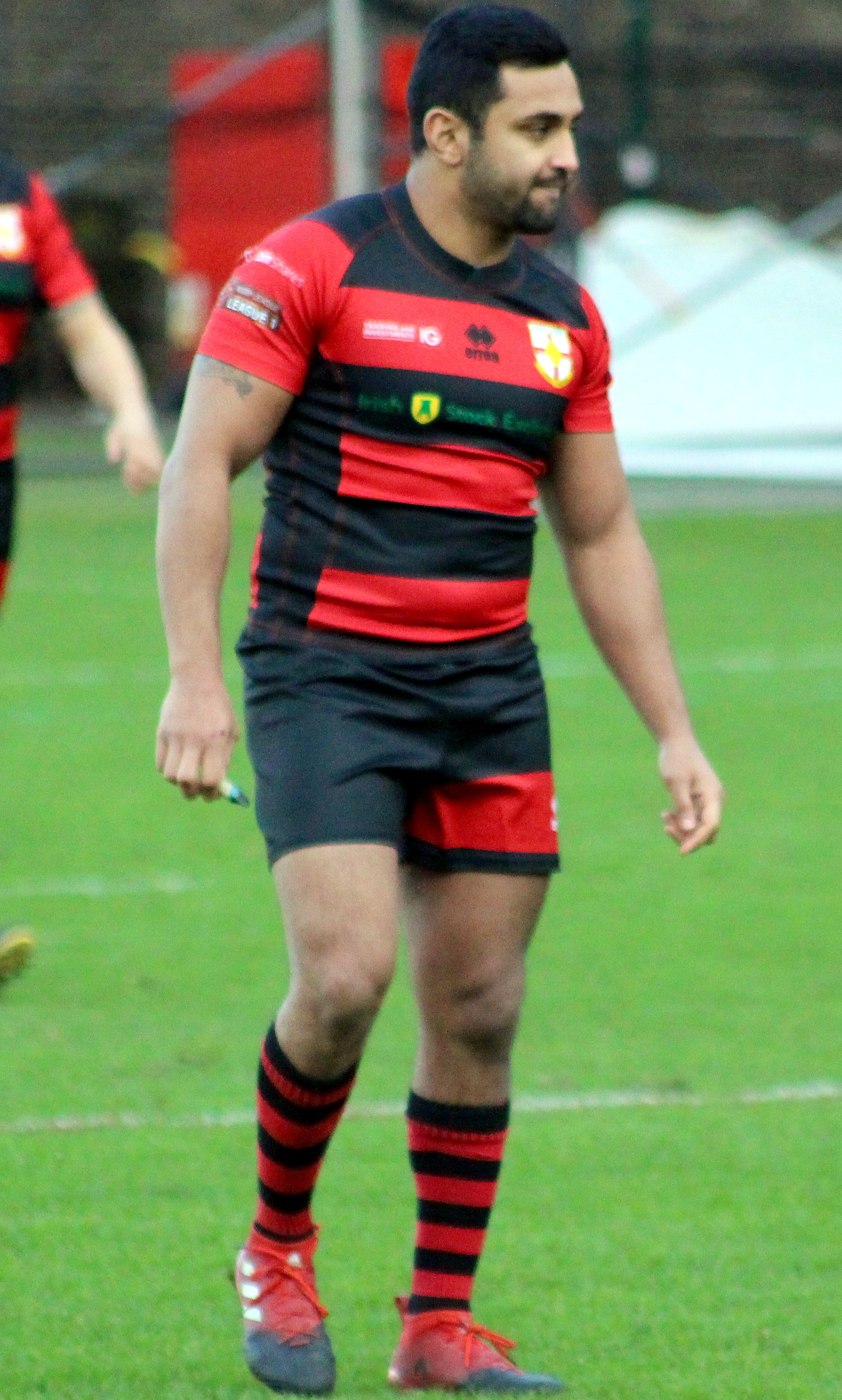

Personal information
- Full name: Mike Bishay
- Born: 8 February 1993 (age 33) Ashford, Surrey, England
- Height: 5 ft 6 in (1.68 m)
- Weight: 12 st 12 lb (82 kg)

Playing information
- Position: Hooker, Scrum-half
Club
Years	Team	Pld	T	G	FG	P
2013–14	London Broncos	19	2	2	0	6
2013(DR)	→ Hemel Stags	11	3	30	1	73
2013(DR)–14	→ London Skolars	15	8	8	1	49
2015–15	Norths Devils	0	0	0	0	0
2015–	London Skolars	54	20	49	0	178
	Total	99	33	89	2	306
- Source: As of 17 May 2018

Mike Bishay (born 8 February 1993) is an English rugby league footballer who plays for the London Skolars in League 1.

Bishay spent 7 years at the London Broncos after joining from Hemel Stags. He spent the 2013 at Championship One clubs Hemel Stags, and the London Skolars as well as making his Super League début for the Broncos. He plays primary at hooker and equally at halfback.

== Background ==
Bishay was born in Ashford, Surrey, England, Bishay is of Sri Lankan descent.[2]

== Playing career ==
For the 2013 season, Bishay played for the Hemel Stags, and the London Skolars in the Championship One after being put on dual registration to the two clubs after not being eligible (by age) to play for the London Broncos u19s any more. Bishay scored an impressive 73 points for the Hemel Stags in 11 appearances and scored a try and a drop goal in 5 appearances for the London Skolars.

Bishay made his début for the London Broncos in the Super League on 1 June 2013 in the 30-30 draw to Castleford Tigers. His first try for the Broncos came on 29 June 2013 in the 44-30 defeat by Salford Red Devils.

In 2014, Bishay was given the no14 shirt at the Broncos and continued to play Super League, and occasionally played for the London Skolars in the Championship One on dual registration.

In 2015, Bishay signed for the Norths Devils in the Queensland Cup in Australia but later requested to end his contract due to the lack of first team opportunities. The former Super League player later signed for the London Skolars in the Kingstone Press League 1.

== Career stats ==
Season	Appearance	Tries	Goals	F/G	Points
2013 Hemel Stags	11	3	30	1	73
2013 London Skolars	5	1	0	1	5
2013 London Broncos	8	1	0	0	4
2014 London Broncos	10	1	2	0	5
Total	39	9	32	2	96

(For 2014 Super League season highlights, stats and results click on 2014 Super League season results)
