= Rob Powell =

Professional RL coach and English former rugby league footballer

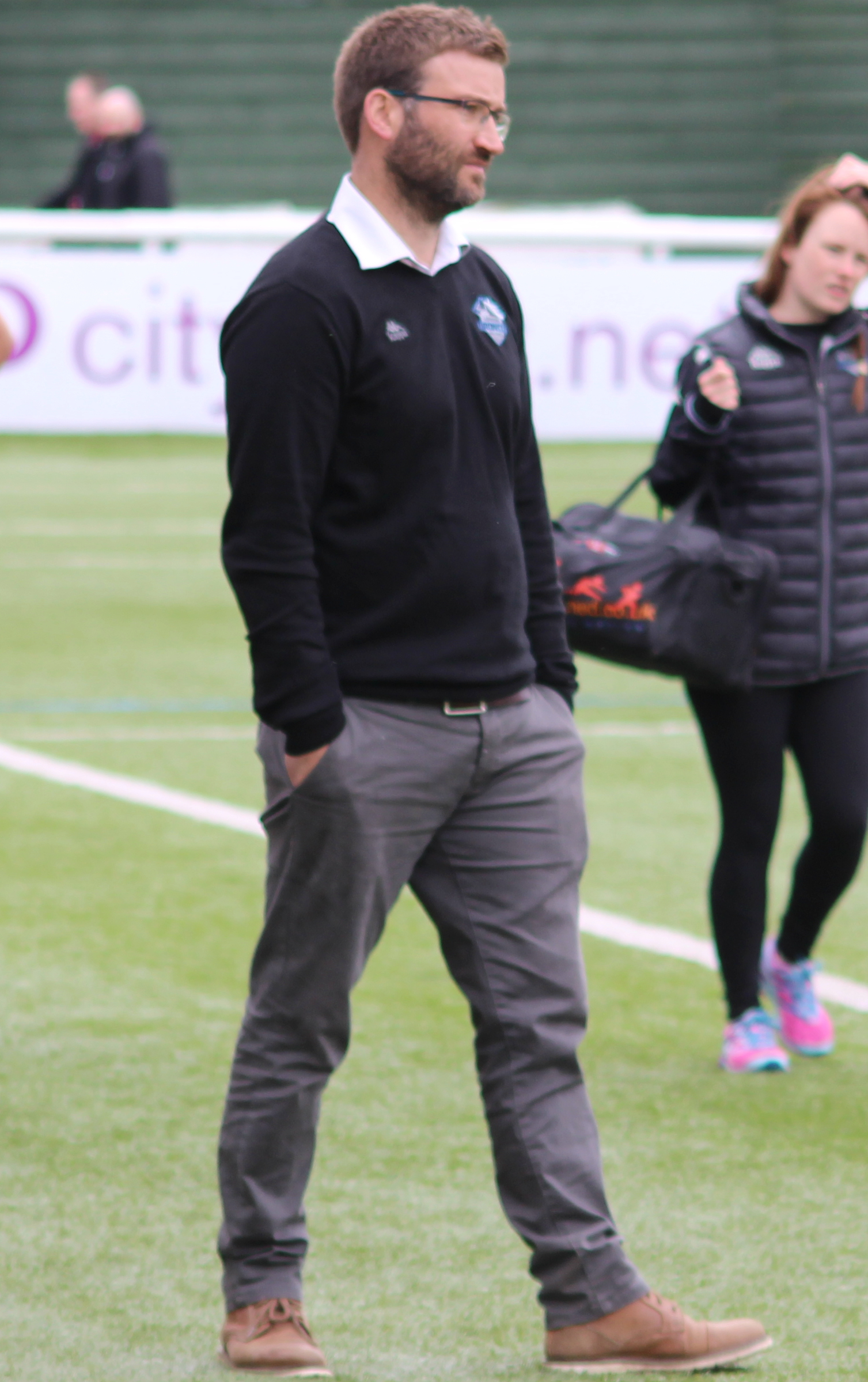

Personal information
- Full name: Robert Powell
- Born: 16 August 1980 (age 45) Sheffield, Yorkshire, England
- Position: head coach

Coaching information

Rugby league
Club
| Years | Team | Gms | W | D | L | W% |
| 2005–06 | South London Storm | 28 | 24 | 0 | 4 | 86 |
| 2010–12 | Harlequins RL | 59 | 16 | 1 | 42 | 27 |
| 2014–21 | Medway Dragons | 18 | 14 | 0 | 4 | 78 |
| | Total | 105 | 54 | 1 | 50 | 51 |
Representative
| Years | Team | Gms | W | D | L | W% |
| 2010 | Lebanon | 2 | 1 | 0 | 1 | 50 |

Rugby union
Club
| Years | Team | Gms | W | D | L | W% |
| 2021– | Richmond F.C. |
- Source: As of 5 August 2023

Robert Powell (born 16 August 1980) is the head coach of rugby union side Richmond F.C. He is the former head coach of the London Broncos Rugby League Club and former defence coach at Cardiff Blues Rugby Union club.

== Background ==
Powell was born in Sheffield, Yorkshire, England.

== Career ==
His background in Rugby League began in 1998 at Newcastle University, where he studied history. However, his playing experience lasted only a handful of games, and his brief playing career in the sport ended at the age of 19.

After completing his bachelor's degree at Newcastle University, he started an MSc in sports management at Northumbria University, and this period of his life saw him manage his former university at Rugby League.

His side won the North East Cup, qualified for the BUSA final and twice competed in the Challenge Cup during his three years in charge, which saw him progress to the Challenge Cup second round in 2001.

He was introduced to London Broncos and completed a six-week placement as part of his course in 2002.

=== South London Storm ===
In 2003, he moved to London as a full-time Rugby League community sports coach, introducing new players and clubs to the game, and became assistant to Darryl Pitt at South London Storm.

When Pitt departed, Powell took charge in December 2004, and shortly after the club announced their intention to move from a nationwide competition to the London centric RLC Premier Division.

The club excelled in this weaker competition, and Powell won Coach of the Year in 2005, whilst in 2006 the club won the RLC Premier Division.

=== Harlequins RL / London Broncos ===
Powell then became the under-16 foundation coach at Harlequins Rugby League club in 2006, and a series of coaches departing, such as Dave Evans and Damian McGrath, saw him become the under 21s assistant coach and then assistant to head coach to Brian McDermott in a very short space of time.

As one of two assistants to McDermott – the other being Latham Tawhai – these three saw the club's performances decline year on year from 7th in 2006 to 9th in both 2007 and 2008 then to 11th in 2009 and finally to 13th in 2010.

McDermott and Powell in tandem had seen only eight wins from their last 40 games together.

When McDermott announced he was moving on, Powell was not really viewed as a replacement due to his relative lack of seniority and playing experience.

It was a huge shock within the world of Rugby League when he was appointed head coach.

His first year in sole charge saw him got off to an amazing start with three pre-season wins followed by a win at the Magic weekend against Catalans, a home win v Crusaders, an away win at Leeds, a close home defeat by Huddersfield and an away win at St Helens. Winning four games from the first five saw the London Super League franchise top for the first time ever.

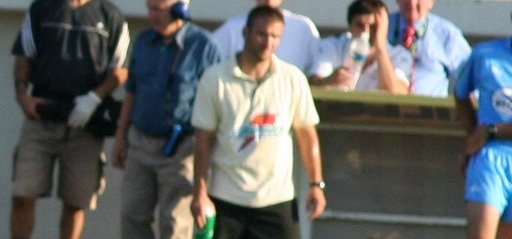
Powell coaching in 2011

However, there were only a further two wins, one draw and nineteen losses from the next twenty two games and it was widely expected that Powell would leave the club at the end of the 2011 season.

In 2012 London Broncos heavily invested in the transfer market and spent up to the salary cap but continued to lose heavily week on week, gaining just three wins from 20 matches.

Some London Broncos supporters campaigned for his removal and a series of negative comments on RL Fans Forum and the club's official Facebook page. Midseason the club acknowledged that there would be a review.

About two months later Powell was removed from the head coach position on 17 July 2012.

He was replaced by Tony Rea, who went on to have four wins from the last seven games.

=== Cardiff Blues (RU) ===
On 18 October 2012 it was announced that Powell would be working at the Cardiff Blues Rugby Union Club.

After a particularly heavy defeat by Exeter Chiefs in the Heineken Cup, it was announced on 17 October 2013 that Powell and the Cardiff Blues had parted company.

=== Medway Dragons ===
On 13 March 2014, Medway Dragons announced the appointment of Powell as head coach in plans to join League 1 in 5 years time. In his first season, he won the South East Premier League grand final with the Dragons.

== Coaching statistics ==
As of 5 May 2015

| Team | From | To | Record | | | | | | | |
| Team | From | To | G | W | D | L | PF | PA | PD | Win % |
|---|---|---|---|---|---|---|---|---|---|---|
| London Broncos | Start of 2011 Season | 17 July 2012 | 52 | 12 | 1 | 39 | 1,070 | 1,750 | −680 | 23.08 |
