= Rob Thomas (rugby league) =

English rugby league footballer

Personal information
- Full name: Robert Thomas
- Born: 9 October 1990 (age 35) Ashford, Kent, England
- Height: 6 ft 2 in (188 cm)
- Weight: 17 st 13 lb (114 kg)

Playing information
- Position: Prop
Club
Years	Team	Pld	T	G	FG	P
2009–12	Harlequins RL	2	0	0	0	0
2009(loan)	→ London Skolars	2	0	0	0	0
2010(loan)	→ London Skolars	2	0	0	0	0
2011(loan)	→ London Skolars	2	0	0	0	0
2012(loan)	→ London Skolars
2013–14	London Skolars	45	12	0	0	44
2015	Hemel Stags
2016	London Skolars
	Total	53	12	0	0	44
- Source: As of 10 February 2018

Rob Thomas (born 9 October 1990) is an English professional rugby league footballer who has played in the 2010s. He has played at club level for the West London Sharks, Harlequins RL (now the London Broncos), the London Skolars in Championship One, and the Hemel Stags in the Kingstone Press League 1 as a prop.

== Background ==
Rob Thomas was born in Ashford, Kent, England.

== Playing career ==
Rob Thomas played for the West London Sharks before signing for the London Broncos academy at 13 years old.

=== Club career ===
Rob Thomas made his début for Harlequins RL (now London Broncos) as an Interchange/substitute in the 22–24 defeat by Bradford Bulls in the Super League XVI match at Odsal Stadium, Bradford on Sunday 3 April 2011.
