= David Howell (rugby league) =

Australian rugby league footballer

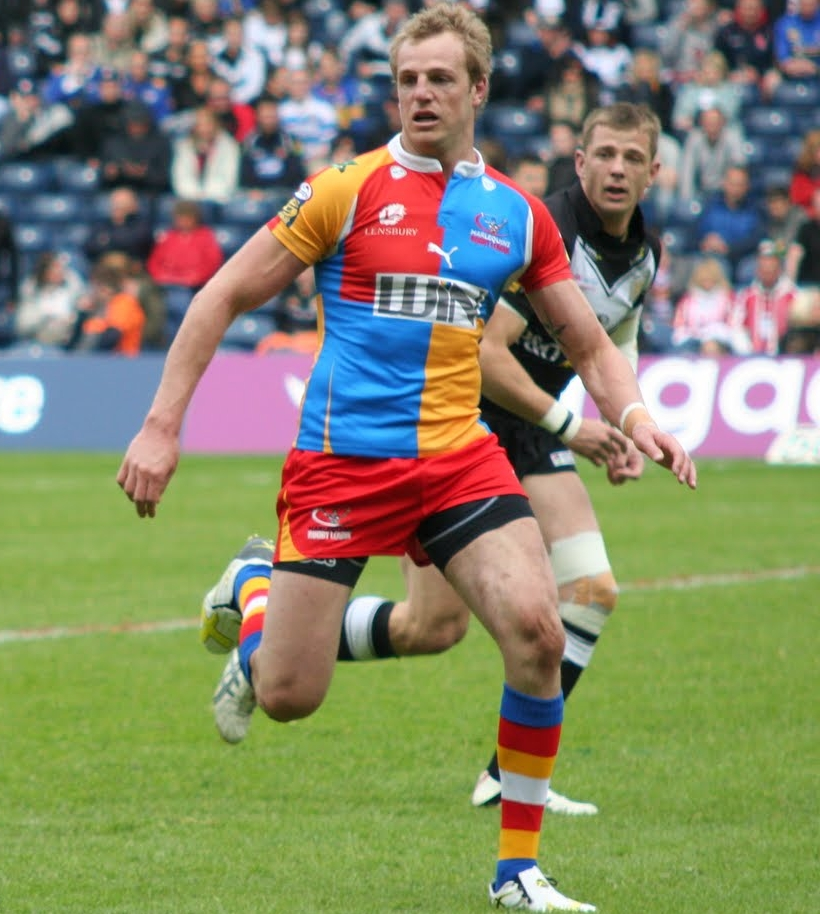

Personal information
- Full name: David Howell
- Born: 18 November 1983 (age 43) Camden, New South Wales, Australia

Playing information
- Height: 1.91 m (6 ft 3 in)
- Weight: 96 kg (15 st 2 lb)
- Position: Centre, Wing
Club
Years	Team	Pld	T	G	FG	P
2003–04	St. George Illawarra	12	5	0	0	20
2005–07	Canberra Raiders	48	15	0	0	60
2008–13	London Broncos	109	36	0	0	144
	Total	169	56	0	0	224

David Howell (born 18 November 1983) is an Australian professional rugby league footballer for Harlequins RL in the Super League. He primarily plays as a centre, and can also operate as a winger. Howell previously played for the St George Illawarra Dragons and the Canberra Raiders in the National Rugby League.

== NRL career ==
Howell made his first grade début for the St George Illawarra Dragons in 2003, where he made 12 NRL appearances alongside brother Michael Howell before joining the Canberra Raiders in 2005.

He was released from the final year of his contract with the Canberra Raiders to join the London-based Harlequins. The Raiders told Howell he would not have a spot in the team after 2008 when his contract terminated.

Howell scored 15 tries in 48 games for Canberra during the last three seasons.

== Super League career ==
Originally linked with Wigan, Howell signed a two-year deal at The Stoop.

David is a bit of a well kept secret in Australia. I've done a lot of homework on him, including speaking to some of his ex-coaches, and I've been told by them that he's got the potential to be another Michael Withers...David has got a big frame and I'm expecting him to fill the gap left by Paul Sykes

— Brian McDermott, Quins RL Head Coach

He was the sixth addition to the Londoners squad for 2008's Super League XIII. Howell played in the centres and replaced Great Britain international Paul Sykes.

Howell's solid form in the Super League has sparked rumours of a return to the National Rugby League (NRL). Whether or not Howell decides to leave The Stoop is yet to be seen.
