= Mark Bryant (rugby league) =

Australian rugby league footballer

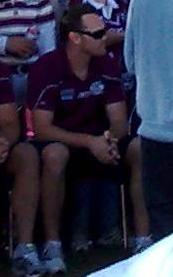

Personal information
- Full name: Mark Bryant
- Born: 10 April 1981 (age 45) Cowra, New South Wales, Australia

Playing information
- Height: 185 cm (6 ft 1 in)
- Weight: 107 kg (16 st 12 lb)
- Position: Prop
Club
Years	Team	Pld	T	G	FG	P
2002–04	Canberra Raiders	7	0	0	0	0
2005–08	Manly Sea Eagles	93	3	0	0	12
2009–11	Crusaders RL	80	1	0	0	4
2012–13	London Broncos	59	3	1	0	14
	Total	239	7	1	0	30

Mark Bryant (born 10 April 1981) is a former professional rugby league footballer who last played for the London Broncos in the Super League. He had previously played for Crusaders and Manly Sea Eagles in the National Rugby League. He played as a prop.

== Early life ==
While attending Cootamundra High School, Bryant played for the Australian Schoolboys team in 1998.

== Playing career ==
Bryant started his NRL career with the Canberra Raiders in 2002. Playing only seven first grade games for the Canberra club, Bryant moved to the Manly-Warringah Sea Eagles in 2005. With Manly, he played in the 2007 NRL grand final defeat by the Melbourne Storm as well as the 2008 NRL Grand Final victory over the same opponents.

Bryant made the move to the Super League for the 2009 season to play for the Crusaders in their first Super League campaign. Following the demise of the Crusaders, Byrant joined London Broncos, starting in 2012.
