= Erjon Dollapi =

Albanian-born rugby league footballer

Personal information
- Born: 16 March 1993 (age 33) Tropojë, Albania
- Height: 1.83 m (6 ft 0 in)
- Weight: 97 kg (15 st 4 lb)

Playing information
- Position: Prop
Club
Years	Team	Pld	T	G	FG	P
2013–15	London Broncos	38	7	0	0	28
2013–14	London Skolars (DR)	17	7	0	0	28
2015	Oxford (DR)	1	0	0	0	0
2015–	London Skolars	30	19	0	0	8
	Total	86	33	0	0	64
- Source: As of 16 December 2017

Erjon Dollapi (born 16 March 1993 in Tropojë, Albania) is an Albanian-born rugby league footballer who plays for the London Skolars in league 1.

== Early years ==
He was born in Albania but moved to London, England as a child.

== Playing career ==
=== Early career ===
Dollapi began playing rugby league in 2007 after starting through Harlequins Rugby League Community Team and Richmond's Schools Sports Partnership's Self Esteem Through Sport programme (SETS). He went on to play for West London Sharks and Harlequins RL Under-16s foundation team on a scholarship.

=== London Skolars ===
Dollapi joined the London Skolars from the London Broncos on a dual registration on 12 February for the 2013 season following a partnership agreement signed by the two clubs which saw 5 Broncos dual register for Skolars. He featured and scored a try in Northern Rail Bowl Final against North Wales Crusaders, however Skolars lost the game 42–24.

=== London Broncos - ===
Dollapi made his Super League début on 1 April 2013 against Warrington Wolves at Halliwell Jones Stadium. He came off the bench to score the last try of the game from close range, a game which ended in a 54–20 defeat for the Broncos.

He signed a new one-year contract with the London Broncos on 17 November 2014 for the 2015 campaign in the Championship.

Having left the London Broncos in late 2015, Dollapi signed a new contract with the London Skolars in January 2016.

== International career ==
Despite having only had played rugby league for two years, Dollapi received a call up from the England under-18 team in October 2009 where he earned one cap.
