= Tony Rea =

Australian rugby league footballer and coach

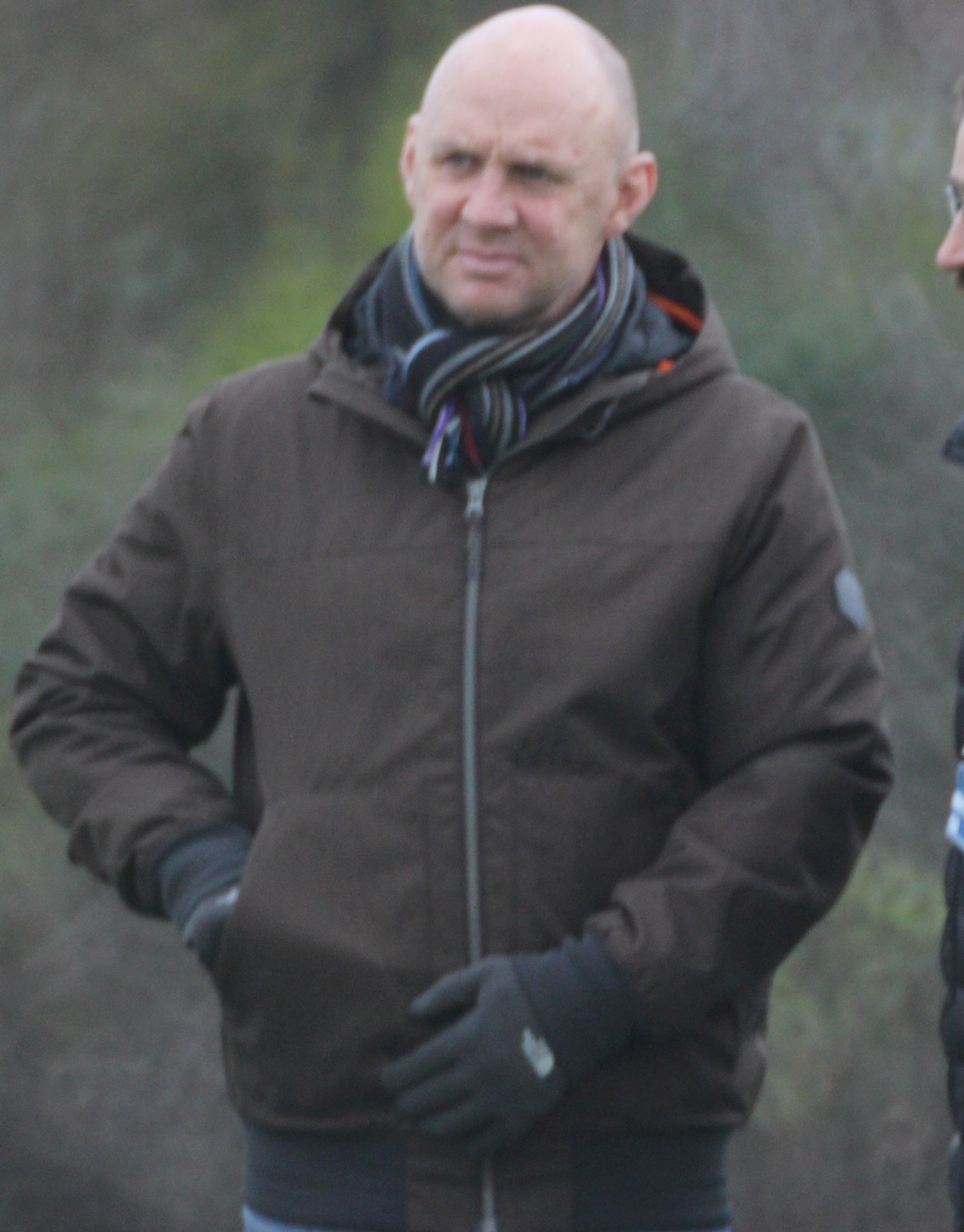

Personal information
- Full name: Anthony Paul Rea
- Born: 25 July 1966 (age 60) Bundaberg, Queensland, Australia

Playing information
- Position: Hooker
Club
Years	Team	Pld	T	G	FG	P
1984–88	Brothers (Brisbane)
1988–94	North Sydney Bears	120	14	14	1	85
1995–96	London Broncos	47	4	0	0	16
	Total	167	18	14	1	101

Coaching information

Rugby league
Club
Years	Team	Gms	W	D	L	W%
1999–06	London Broncos	153	71	8	74	46
2000–06	London Broncos
2012–14	London Broncos	38	12	2	24	32
	Total	191	83	10	98	43

Rugby union
Club
Years	Team	Gms	W	D	L	W%
2011–12	Brumbies

Tony Rea (born 25 July 1966) is an Australian former professional rugby league coach and player. In November 2026, he was appointed CEO of the Perth Bears.

Rea played club football as a hooker in the Brisbane Rugby League for Brothers, in the New South Wales Rugby League as captain of the North Sydney Bears, and in the Super League for the London Broncos, later becoming their coach. Rea also briefly coached Super Rugby team, the Brumbies before returning to London to coach the Broncos.

== Early years ==
Rea was born on 25 July 1966 in Bundaberg, Queensland, Australia.

Rea completed a Diploma of Teaching at North Brisbane College of Advanced Education, Carseldine Campus, from 1984 - 87.

During this time, he began his playing career in 1984 in the local Brisbane competition at the Brothers club.

== Playing career ==
In 1988, Rea was recruited to play in the premier NSWRL competition by North Sydney.

Playing at a time when rugby league in Sydney was semi-professional, he began teaching at St Aloysius' College, Milsons Point, as a primary school teacher.

Mainly playing in the hooking position and being appointed captain when John Dorahy retired in the middle of 1989. He played seven seasons with the Bears, but lost his first grade berth to Mark Soden in the middle of 1994.

Rea was recruited in 1994 alongside many fellow Antipodeans by the new Australian owners of the London rugby league club, who changed the name of the club from London Crusaders to London Broncos. He played for the club during the change of top-flight rugby league in England from the winter season to summer Rugby League, with the advent of the new Super League competition in 1996.

== Administration ==
After 47 London appearances scoring 11 tries, Rea retired from playing at the end of the inaugural Super League season in 1996 to take up the Chief Executive role at the club. He stayed in the role until 2000.

Key moments during his time as Chief Executive include:-

- 1997 – London Broncos defeat Australian side Canberra Raiders in the ill-fated Super League World Club Championship series
- 1997 – Richard Branson's Virgin empire buy a majority stake in the club (Virgin sold stake in club in 2001)
- 1998 – Head coach Tony Currie leaves the club at the end of the 1998 Super League season
- 1999 – Club appoints Dan Stains as head coach; Stains leads Broncos to first Rugby League Challenge Cup Final in the club's (Fulham, London Crusaders, London Broncos) history. Broncos lose in the final against Leeds Rhinos
- 1999 – Club sacks Stains after Broncos endure long losing streak during the 1999 Super League campaign. Rea appointed temporary joint head coach with Stains' assistant Les Kiss. Rea and Kiss manage to steer Broncos out of slump.
- 1999 – Club decide to move home, from Twickenham-based Harlequins' Stoop ground to south-east London football outfit Charlton Athletic's Valley stadium (Broncos have subsequently moved to Brentford FC's Griffin Park in 2002 and back to the re-branded Twickenham Stoop in October 2005)
- 2000 – Club appoint John Monie as head coach. Monie only stays in the job until the last month of the 2000 Super League season, the club endured a mediocre season during his tenure. Rea takes over caretaker coach until the end of the season, Broncos sail to mid-table security

== Coaching career ==
Rea was persuaded at the end of the 2000 season to become head coach on a full-time basis, so this meant he had to resign his Chief Executive role. During his time as head coach, he led the Broncos to two post-regular season Super League play-off appearances (in 2003 and 2005).

On 8 July 2006, after a disappointing run of form for the team, the Harlequins Rugby League club announced a re-organisation of the coaching set-up. Rea was replaced as head coach by Leeds Rhinos' assistant coach Brian McDermott, but was appointed onto the club's board of directors.

On 4 June 2008 he revealed he has accepted the assistant coach role with the Brumbies, the rugby union Super Rugby side based in Canberra. He was appointed the Brumbies 2011 head coach after Andy Friend was fired two games into the season. In July 2012, Rea agreed to replace Rob Powell as interim London Broncos head coach until the end of the 2012 season. This was made permanent in August 2012.

In 2014 Rea stepped down as head coach of the London Broncos and was replaced by his assistant coach Joey Grima.
