= Chris Bailey (rugby league) =

Australian rugby league footballer

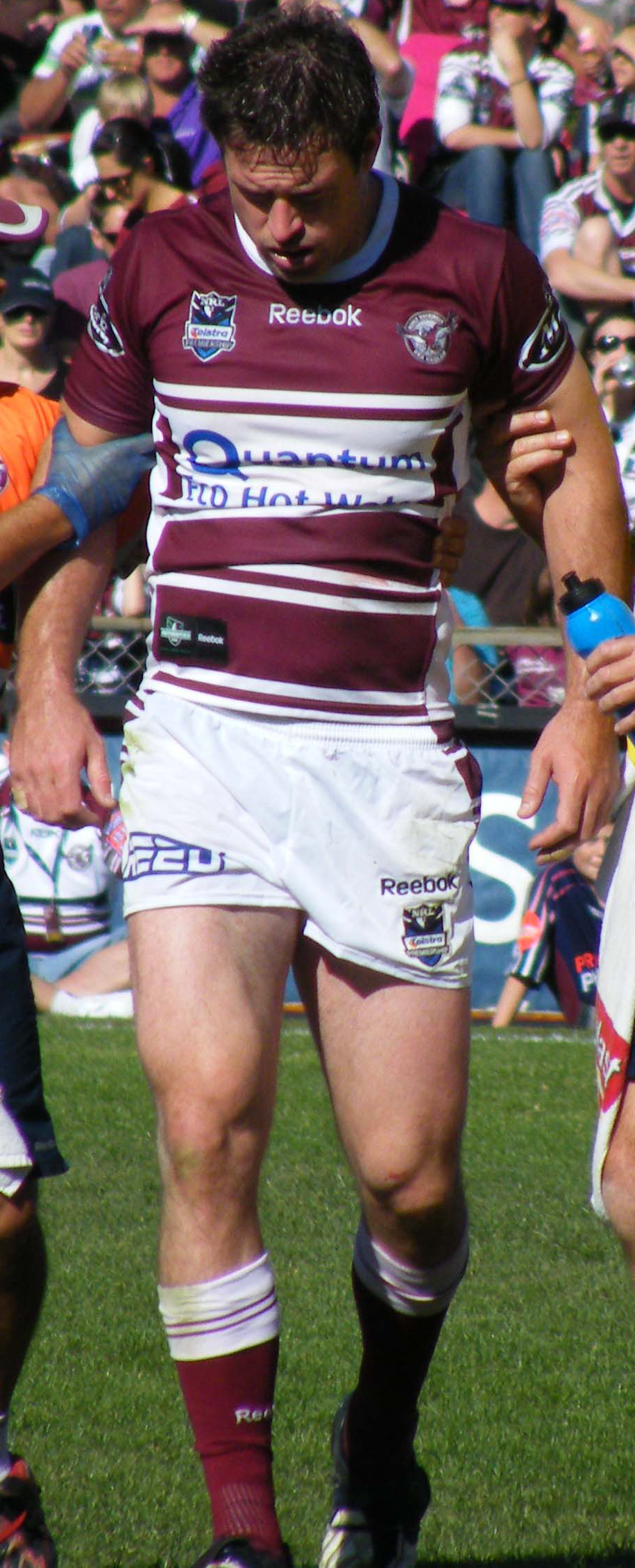

Personal information
- Full name: Christopher Bailey
- Born: 5 July 1982 (age 43) Inverell, New South Wales, Australia

Playing information
- Height: 188 cm (6 ft 2 in)
- Weight: 96 kg (15 st 2 lb)
- Position: Lock, Second-row, Five-eighth
Club
| Years | Team | Pld | T | G | FG | P |
|---|---|---|---|---|---|---|
| 2006–08 | Newcastle Knights | 29 | 10 | 0 | 0 | 40 |
| 2009–10 | Manly Sea Eagles | 46 | 7 | 0 | 0 | 28 |
| 2011–13 | London Broncos | 71 | 18 | 0 | 0 | 72 |
| 2014–15 | Huddersfield Giants | 34 | 5 | 0 | 0 | 20 |
| | Total | 180 | 40 | 0 | 0 | 160 |
Representative
| Years | Team | Pld | T | G | FG | P |
| 2010 | Prime Minister's XIII | 1 | 0 | 0 | 0 | 0 |
- Relatives: Phil Bailey (brother)

Chris Bailey (born 5 July 1982), also known by the nicknames of "Bails" and "Ice Ice Bailey", is an Australian former professional rugby league footballer who played in the 2000s and 2010s. He played for the Newcastle Knights and the Manly Warringah Sea Eagles in the National Rugby League, and the London Broncos and the Huddersfield Giants in the Super League, primarily as a five-eighth, but also as a lock.

== Background ==
Bailey was born in Inverell, New South Wales, Australia. He is the younger brother of former New South Wales and Australia representative forward Phil Bailey.

== Career ==
=== National Rugby League ===
Bailey made his NRL début for the Newcastle Knights against Wests Tigers at Campbelltown Stadium in round 10 of 2006. Before his NRL début for the Knights, Bailey had been a junior for the Balmain Tigers. He was described by his Newcastle coach Brian Smith as an old-school Five-eighth.

He had been linked with a move to join his brother at Wigan as a replacement for Trent Barrett. but remained with the Knights until the end of the 2008 season.

Bailey joined the Manly-Warringah Sea Eagles, then the defending NRL premiers, on a three-year deal from the 2009 NRL season. He played five-eighth for the Sea Eagles in their 2009 World Club Challenge win over the 2008 Super League Grand Final winners, the Leeds Rhinos. Manly won the game 28–20 in front of 32,569 fans at Elland Road in Leeds.

Other than the WCC win, Bailey's time at Manly was ultimately unsuccessful. The injury ravaged Sea Eagles failed to advance past the first week of the finals in both 2009 and 2010 and the emergence of young New Zealand five-eighth Kieran Foran in 2009 saw Bailey released by the club at the end of the 2010 season (ironically Manly, with most of its star players free from injury, would go on to win the 2011 NRL Grand Final with Foran at 5/8).

=== Super League ===
After leaving Manly, Bailey joined Super League club London Broncos on a three-year deal from the 2011 season. He then joined Huddersfield Giants on a two-year contract from the start of the 2014 season.
