= Dan Sarginson =

England international rugby league footballer

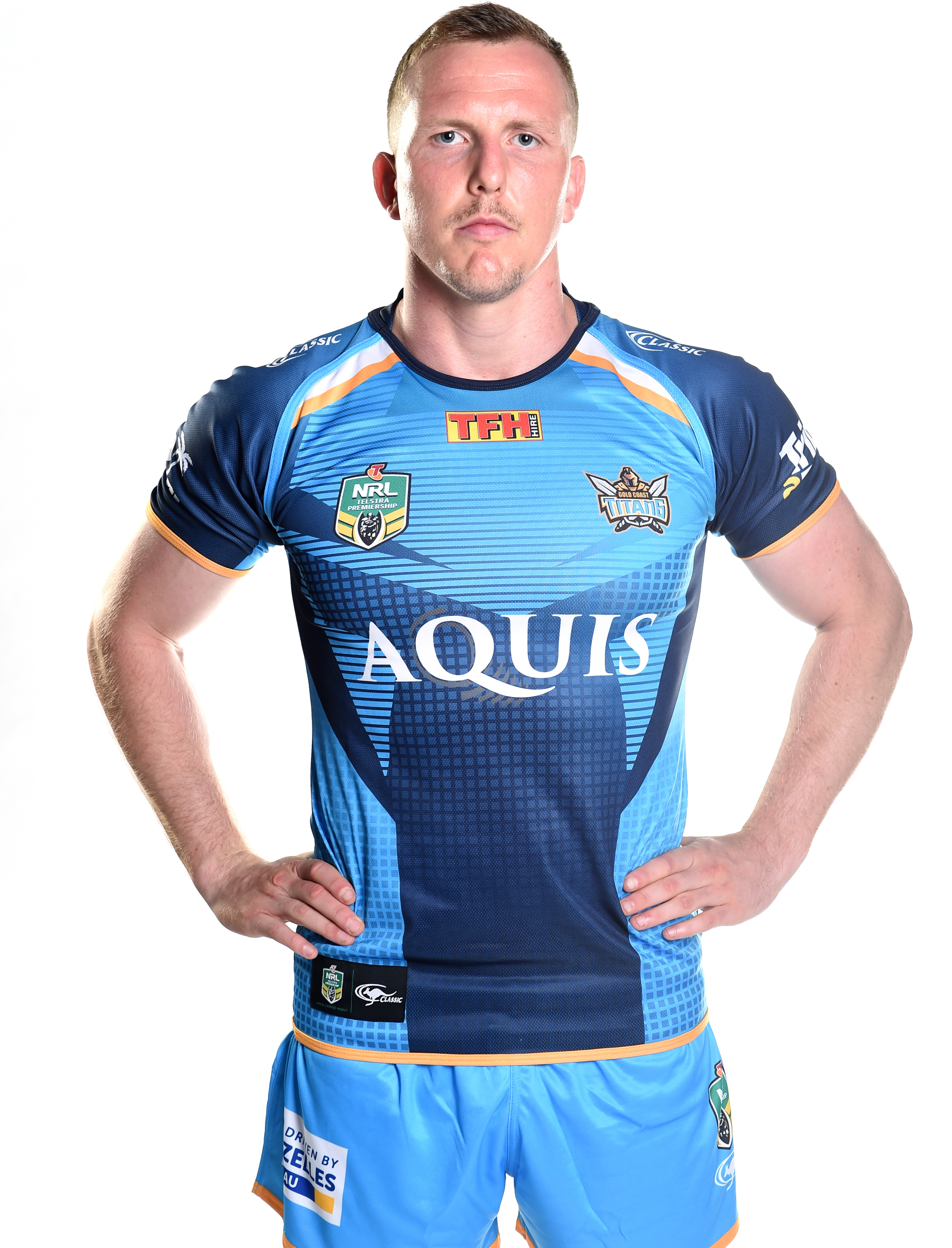

Personal information
- Full name: Daniel Sarginson
- Born: 26 May 1993 (age 32) Perth, Western Australia, Australia
- Height: 6 ft 1 in (1.85 m)
- Weight: 14 st 11 lb (94 kg)

Playing information
- Position: Centre, Fullback
Club
Years	Team	Pld	T	G	FG	P
2011–13	London Broncos	49	16	0	0	64
2014–16	Wigan Warriors	81	27	0	0	108
2017–18	Gold Coast Titans	6	0	0	0	0
2018–19	Wigan Warriors	46	10	0	0	40
2020–23	Salford Red Devils	28	5	0	0	12
	Total	210	58	0	0	224
Representative
Years	Team	Pld	T	G	FG	P
2012–23	England Knights	3	2	0	0	8
2014–16	England	3	0	0	0	0
- Source: As of 21 May 2021

Dan Sarginson (born 26 May 1993) is a former England and England Knights international rugby league footballer who previously played as a centre or fullback, for the Salford Red Devils.

Sarginson played for the London Broncos and the Wigan Warriors over two separate spells in the Super League. He has also played for the Gold Coast Titans in the NRL.

On 10 March 2023, Sarginson left Salford by mutual agreement. However, an official statement from Salford, did not mention anything as to why he left the club.

On 13 March, it was revealed that Sarginson had retired from the sport with immediate effect, to "pursue a new career".

== Background ==
Sarginson was born in Perth, Western Australia.

== Career ==
=== Early life and career ===
Sarginson was raised in Hemel Hempstead, where he attended Cavendish School, and played for England as a schoolboy. He played for Hemel Stags at junior level before joining Super League side Harlequins RL.

=== London Broncos ===
Sarginson made his début for Harlequins (now London Broncos) and scored a try in the 70–0 victory over Gateshead Thunder in the Challenge Cup match at Gateshead International Stadium on Friday 6 May 2011, and made his Super League début for Harlequins and scored two tries in the 18–26 defeat by Salford City Reds at The Willows, Salford on Friday 1 July 2011.

Sarginson was offered a four-year contract by the London Broncos in 2012 but refused to sign the deal. After this he was injured on-and-off for the majority of his time in London and went on to play just 51 times for the capital Super League side, scoring 17 tries. On 18 October 2013, Wigan announced that they had signed the out-of-contract Sarginson for the 2014 and 2015 Super League seasons.

=== Wigan Warriors ===
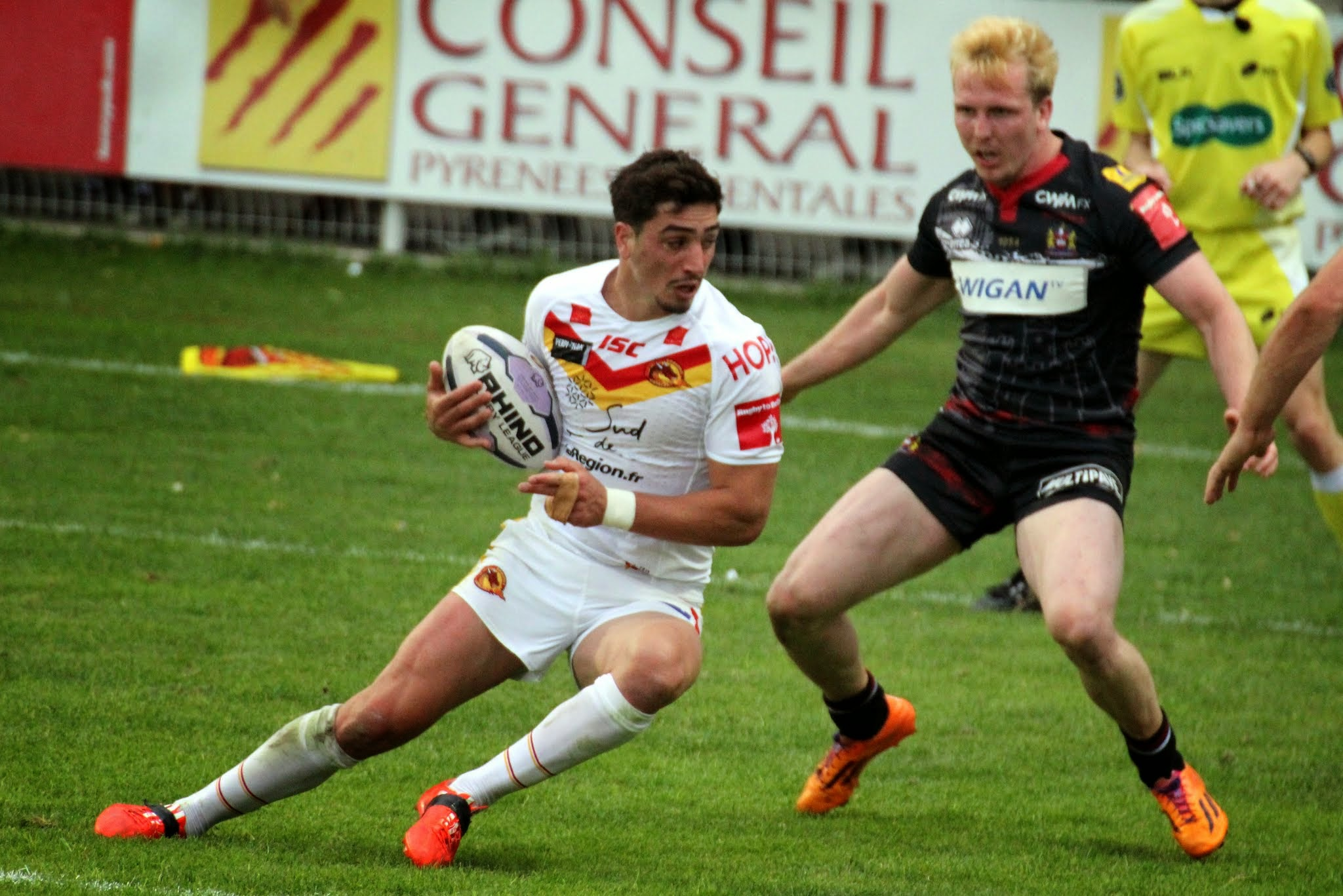
Sarginson in action for Wigan in 2015

Sarginson's performances for the Wigan side earned him a nomination for Super League's Young Player of the Year for the 2014 season, but he would lose out to Daryl Clark of the Castleford Tigers.

Sarginson played in the 2014 Super League Grand Final defeat by St. Helens at Old Trafford.

His injury record improved and he was mainly available for selection during his first spell at Wigan. Sarginson played in the 2016 Super League Grand Final victory over Warrington at Old Trafford.

=== Gold Coast Titans ===
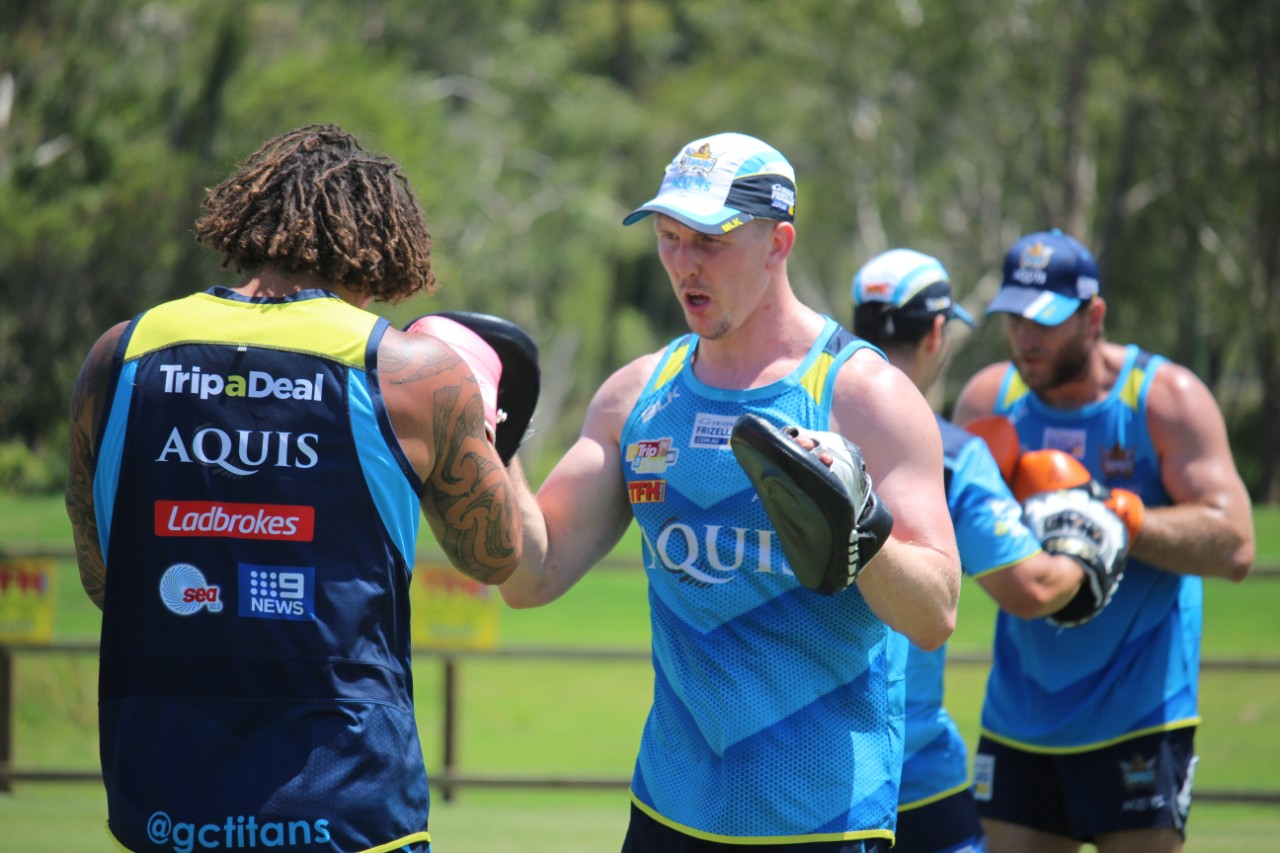
Sarginson training at the Gold Coast Titans in 2017

On 29 March 2016, Sarginson announced that he would leave the Super League, and join the National Rugby League club, Gold Coast for the 2017 and 2018 seasons. He made six appearances for Gold Coast during the 2017 NRL season before suffering a season-ending shoulder injury.

=== Return to Wigan ===
On 13 December 2017, the Gold Coast club agreed to release Sarginson who had made few appearances and faced a court case in his time in Australia. Wigan re-signed Sarginson on a two-year deal. On his return he was handed the number 3 shirt vacated by Anthony Gelling.

After starting in the first two matches of the season he missed the next two months with a recurrence of a shoulder injury which restricted his appearances whilst at the Gold Coast. On his return to the team he scored his first try of the season against the Catalans Dragons before missing a months of action with an ankle injury a few weeks later. A try against Hull FC was followed a week later by another injury ruling him out for another month before his return to the side against St Helens. A try against the Castleford Tigers and a brace against St Helens followed as he found some of the form which helped the Wigan club lift the Super League trophy in 2016. After a resounding victory over St Helens he received the news that his younger brother had died, as the Wigan club gathered around him, he decided to play just days later against Wakefield Trinity. After an emotional minutes silence Sarginson helped defeat Wakefield to keep Wigan's unbeaten run going. Sarginson played in the 2018 Super League Grand Final victory over Warrington at Old Trafford.

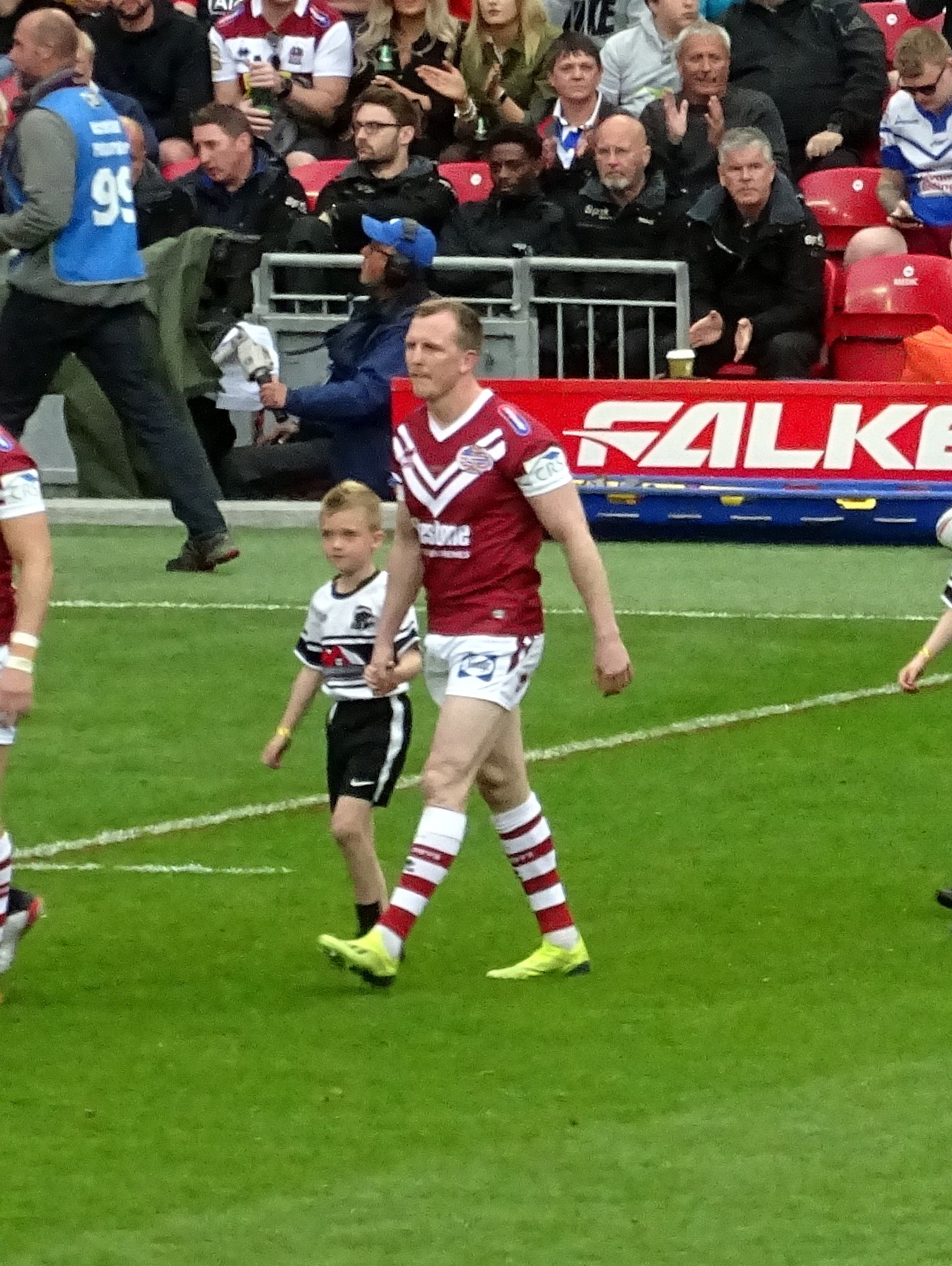
Sarginson taking the field for the Wigan Warriors at Anfield in 2019

=== Salford Red Devils ===
Sarginson signed for Salford for the 2020 season, and would have appeared in the 2020 Challenge Cup Final at Wembley had he not tested positive for COVID-19.

== International career ==
He was part of the England squad for the 2014 Four Nations tournament.

Sarginson was selected in England's 24-man squad for the 2016 Four Nations.

== Career statistics ==
Year	Club	Games	Tries	Points
2011	London Broncos	8	5	20
2012	London Broncos	19	5	20
2013	London Broncos	22	6	24
2014	Wigan Warriors	28	12	48
2015	Wigan Warriors	20	8	32
2016	Wigan Warriors	33	7	28
2017	Gold Coast Titans	6	-	-
2018	Wigan Warriors	22	6	24
2019	Wigan Warriors	23	4	16
2020	Salford Red Devils	12	4	16
2021	Salford Red Devils	12	1	4
2022	Salford Red Devils	5	1	4
	Total	210	58	224
