= 2008 Harlequins Rugby League season =

- Super League XIII Rank: 9th
- Challenge Cup: Fifth round
- 2008 record: Wins: 12; losses: 17
- Points scored: For: 639; against: 813

Team information
- Chairman: David Hughes
- Coach: Brian McDermott
- Captain: Rob Purdham
- Stadium: The Stoop
- Avg. attendance: 3,566
- High attendance: 8,041

Top scorers
- Tries: Tony Clubb - 10; Matt Gafa - 10
- Goals: Rob Purdham - 52
- Points: Rob Purdham - 124
Home colours	Away colours
← 2007	List of seasons	2009 →

The 2008 Harlequins Rugby League season was the twenty-ninth in the club's history and their thirteenth season in the Super League. The club was coached by Brian McDermott, competing in Super League XIII, finishing in 9th place and reaching the Fifth round of the 2008 Challenge Cup.

== Super League XIII table ==
Super League XIII
Pos	Team	Pld	W	D	L	PF	PA	PD	Pts	Qualification
1	St. Helens (L)	27	21	1	5	940	457	+483	43	Semi-final
2	Leeds Rhinos (C)	27	21	0	6	863	413	+450	42	Semi-final
3	Catalans Dragons	27	16	2	9	694	625	+69	34	Elimination semi-finals
4	Wigan Warriors	27	13	3	11	648	698	−50	29	Elimination semi-finals
5	Bradford Bulls	27	14	0	13	705	625	+80	28	Elimination semi-finals
6	Warrington Wolves	27	14	0	13	690	713	−23	28	Elimination semi-finals
7	Hull Kingston Rovers	27	11	1	15	564	713	−149	23	
8	Wakefield Trinity Wildcats	27	11	0	16	574	760	−186	22	
9	Harlequins	27	11	0	16	569	763	−194	22	
10	Huddersfield Giants	27	10	1	16	638	681	−43	21	
11	Hull F.C.	27	8	1	18	538	699	−161	17	
12	Castleford Tigers	27	7	1	19	593	869	−276	15	

Source: superleague.co.uk
Rules for classification: 1st on competition points; 2nd on match points difference.
Competition points: for win = 2; for draw = 1; for loss = 0.
(C) Champions; (L) League Leaders' Shield Winners

== 2008 Fixtures/Results ==
2008 Engage Super League

Rd	Home team	Score	Away team	Result (W/D/L)	Attendance
1	Harlequins RL	28–47	Wigan Warriors	L	8,041
2	Hull	6–24	Harlequins RL	W	13,313
3	Harlequins RL	34–18	Wakefield Trinity Wildcats	W	3,176
4	Castleford Tigers	16–22	Harlequins RL	W	6,268
5	Harlequins RL	24–0	Huddersfield Giants	W	3,284
6		–		.	—
7		–		.	—
CCC4		–		.	—
8		–		.	—
9		–		.	—
10		–		.	—
11		–		.	—
12		–		.	—
13 (a)		–		.	—
14		–		.	—
15		–		.	—
16		–		.	—
17		–		.	—
18		–		.	—
19		–		.	—
20		–		.	—
21		–		.	—
22		–		.	—
23		–		.	—
24		–		.	—
25		–		.	—
26		–		.	—
27		–		.	—
ESL PO1		–		.	—
ESL PO2		–		.	—
ESL PO3		–		.	—
ESL GF		–		.	—

Notes
(a) Round 13 played at Millennium Stadium, Cardiff.
(b) engage Super League Grand Final to be played at Old Trafford, Manchester.

== 2008 Squad ==
Squad Number	Name	International country	Position	Age	Previous club	Appearances	Tries	Goals	Drop Goals	Points
1	Mark McLinden	(Australia)	Fullback	29	Canberra Raiders	7	1	0	0	4
2	Jon Wells	(England)	Wing	29	Wakefield Trinity Wildcats	19	2	0	0	8
3	Matt Gafa	(Malta)	Centre	30	Canberra Raiders	14	10	0	0	40
4	David Howell	(Australia)	Centre	24	Canberra Raiders	26	8	0	0	32
5	Rikki Sheriffe	(England)	Wing	24	Doncaster	24	8	0	0	32
6	Scott Hill	(Australia)	Stand-off	31	Melbourne Storm	21	7	0	0	28
7	Danny Orr	(England)	Scrum-half	30	Wigan Warriors	25	5	0	0	20
8	Karl Temata	(Cook Islands)	Prop	30	New Zealand Warriors	26	1	0	0	4
9	Chad Randall	(Australia)	Hooker	27	Manly Sea Eagles	29	9	0	0	36
10	Daniel Heckenberg	(Scotland)	Prop	28	Manly Sea Eagles	12	0	0	0	0
11	Louie McCarthy-Scarsbrook	(England)	Second-row	22	London Broncos Academy	15	5	0	0	20
13	Rob Purdham	(England)	Loose forward	28	Whitehaven	23	5	52	0	124
14	Julien Rinaldi	(France)	Hooker	29	Catalans Dragons	23	4	0	0	16
15	Chris Melling	(England)	Fullback	23	Wigan Warriors	20	6	0	0	24
16	Gareth Haggerty	(Ireland)	Prop	26	Salford City Reds	25	5	0	0	20
17	Danny Ward	(England)	Prop	28	Hull Kingston Rovers	28	1	0	0	4
18	Joe Mbu	(Zaire)	Second-row	24	Doncaster	23	1	0	0	4
19	Tony Clubb	(England)	Centre	21	London Broncos Academy	25	10	0	0	40
20	Jon Grayshon	(England)	Prop	25	Huddersfield Giants	21	2	0	0	8
21	David Tootill	(England)	Prop	22	Leeds Rhinos	0	0	0	0	0
22	Dwayne Barker	(England)	Second-row	23	Castleford Tigers	10	1	0	0	4
23	Henry Paul	(New Zealand)	Loose forward	34	Gloucester Rugby	27	7	39	1	107
24	Will Sharp	(Nigeria)	Centre	22	Harlequins Rugby League Academy	15	7	0	0	28
25	Lamont Bryan	(Jamaica)	Wing	20	Harlequins Rugby League Academy	5	0	0	0	0
26	Joe Walsh	(England)	Second-row	19	Leeds Rhinos	2	0	0	0	0
27	Michael Worrincy	(England)	Second-row	22	Harlequins Rugby League Academy	18	9	0	0	36
28	Dave Williams	(England)	Prop	21	Harlequins Rugby League Academy	1	0	0	0	0
29	Adam Janowski	(England)	Prop	20	Harlequins Rugby League Academy	1	0	0	0	0
30	Jamie O'Callaghan	(Ireland)	Centre	17	Harlequins Rugby League Academy	3	0	0	0	0
31	Dylan Skee	(England)	Stand-off	22	Harlequins Rugby League Academy	1	0	0	0	0

== 2008 Signings & transfers ==
2008 Signings/Transfers : Gains
Player	Previous club	Years signed	Until the end of
Scott Hill	Melbourne Storm	2	2008
Julien Rinaldi	Catalans Dragons	2	2008
Jon Grayshon	Huddersfield Giants	1	2007
David Tootill	Leeds Rhinos	2	2008
Chris Melling	Wigan Warriors	1	2007
Danny Orr	Wigan Warriors	3	2009
Sione Faumuina	North Queensland Cowboys	3	2009
Joe Walsh	Leeds Rhinos	2	2008
Andy Smith	Bradford Bulls	1	2007
Richard Villasanti	Cronulla Sharks	2	2008
Luke Burgess	Leeds Rhinos	loan	2007
Joe Mbu	Doncaster	1	2007
Rikki Sheriffe	Doncaster	1	2007
Steve Bannister	St. Helens	3	2009

2008 Signings/Transfers : Losses
Player	Signed for	When left
Luke Dorn	Salford City Reds	2006
Danny Williams	Retirement	2006
Pat Weisner	Hull Kingston Rovers	2006
Nick Bradley-Qalilawa	Manly Sea Eagles	2006
Neil Budworth	Celtic Crusaders	2006
Thomas Leuluai	Wigan Warriors	2006
Mark Tookey	Manly Sea Eagles coaching position	2006
Filimone Lolohea	Released	2006
Joe Mbu	Doncaster	2006
Rikki Sheriffe	Doncaster	2006
Paul Noone	Widnes Vikings	2006
Ade Adebisi	Doncaster	2006
Anthony Stewart	Leigh Centurions	2006
Tim Hartley	Halifax	2006
Sione Faumuina	North Queensland Cowboys	2006
/ Solomon Haumono	Returned to boxing	2006
Richard Villasanti	Retirement due to injury	2007

== 2008 Gains & losses ==
2008 Re-Signings
Player	Until the end of
Chris Melling	2009
Matt Gafa	2008
Karl Temata	2008
Jon Grayshon	2008
Rikki Sheriffe	2008
Henry Paul	2008
Chad Randall	2009

2008 Losses
Player	Signed for	Fee
Lee Hopkins	Retiring	n/a
Paul Sykes	Bradford Bulls	undisclosed
Tyrone Smith	CA Brumbies	released
David Mills	Hull Kingston Rovers	released
Andy Smith	Unknown	released

2008 Gains
Player	Signed from	Fee
Henry Fa'afili	Warrington Wolves	out of contract
Gareth Haggerty	Salford City Reds	pre-contract agreement
Danny Ward	Hull Kingston Rovers	out of contract
