= 2007 Harlequins Rugby League season =

- Super League XII Rank: 7th
- Challenge Cup: Quarter-final
- 2007 record: Wins: 11; draws: 2; losses: 11
- Points scored: For: 534; against: 499

Team information
- Chairman: David Hughes & Ian Lenagan
- Coach: Brian McDermott
- Captain: Mark McLinden & Lee Hopkins
- Stadium: The Stoop
- Avg. attendance: 3,411
- High attendance: 5,657

Top scorers
- Tries: Paul Sykes - 18
- Goals: Paul Sykes - 39
- Points: Paul Sykes - 151
Home colours	Away colours
← 2006	List of seasons	2008 →

The 2007 Harlequins Rugby League season was the twenty-eighth in the club's history and their twelfth season in the Super League. The club was coached by Brian McDermott, competing in Super League XII, finishing in 7th place and reaching the Quarter-finals round of the 2007 Challenge Cup.

== Super League XII table ==
Pos	Team	Pld	W	D	L	PF	PA	PD	Pts	Qualification
1	St Helens (L)	27	19	0	8	783	422	+361	38	Semifinal
2	Leeds Rhinos (C)	27	18	1	8	747	487	+260	37	Semifinal
3	Bradford Bulls	27	17	1	9	778	560	+218	33 (Note: Bradford deducted 2 points for salary cap breaches.)	Elimination semifinal
4	Hull F.C.	27	14	2	11	573	553	+20	30	Elimination semifinal
5	Huddersfield Giants	27	13	1	13	638	543	+95	27	Elimination semifinal
6	Wigan Warriors	27	15	1	11	621	527	+94	27 (Note: Wigan deducted 4 points for salary cap breaches.)	Elimination semifinal
7	Warrington Wolves	27	13	0	14	693	736	−43	26	
8	Wakefield Trinity Wildcats	27	11	1	15	596	714	−118	23	
9	Harlequins	27	10	3	14	495	636	−141	23	
10	Catalans Dragons	27	10	1	16	570	685	−115	21	
11	Hull Kingston Rovers	27	10	0	17	491	723	−232	20	
12	Salford City Reds (R)	27	6	1	20	475	874	−399	13	Relegation to National League One

Source: Rugby League Project
Rules for classification: 1) Points; 2) Points difference; 3) Number of points scored;
(C) Champions; (L) League Leaders' Shield Winners; (R) Relegated

== 2007 Season players ==
Current to Round 19, 2007
Squad no	Player	Appearances	Tries	Goals	F Goals	Points	Contract ends
30	Steve Bannister	3	1	0	0	4	2009
27	Luke Burgess	3	0	0	0	0	2007
19	Tony Clubb	3	0	0	0	0	2008
18	Matt Gafa	20	8	0	0	32	2008
20	Jon Grayshon	17	3	0	0	12	2008
10	Daniel Heckenberg	14	2	0	0	8	2008
6	Scott Hill	18	5	0	0	20	2008
12	Lee Hopkins	22	3	0	0	12	2007
25	Zebastian Lucky Luisi	3	0	0	0	0	2007
29	Joe Mbu	7	0	0	0	0	2007
17	Louie McCarthy-Scarsbrook	18	6	0	0	24	2007
1	Mark McLinden	23	6	0	0	24	2009
15	David Mills	20	0	0	0	0	2007
16	Chris Melling	19	6	0	0	24	2009
7	Danny Orr	23	3	0	0	12	2009
23	Henry Paul	16	2	23	0	54	2008
13	Rob Purdham	17	3	26	0	64	2009
9	Chad Randall	25	7	0	0	28	2009
14	Julien Rinaldi	24	4	0	0	16	2008
28	Rikki Sheriffe	5	2	0	0	8	2008
24	Andy Smith	12	5	0	0	20	2007
4	Tyrone Smith	24	5	0	0	20	2007
3	Paul Sykes	24	16	33	1	141	2009
8	Karl Temata	23	2	0	0	8	2008
21	David Tootill	0	0	0	0	0	2008
11	Richard Villasanti	0	0	0	0	0	2008
26	Joe Walsh	4	0	0	0	0	2008
2	Jon Wells	22	6	0	0	24	2008
22	Michael Worrincy	12	1	0	0	4	2008

== 2007 Signings & transfers ==
Gains

2007 Signings/Transfers
Player	Previous club	Years signed	Until the end of
Scott Hill	Melbourne Storm	2	2008
Julien Rinaldi	Catalans Dragons	2	2008
Jon Grayshon	Huddersfield Giants	1	2007
David Tootill	Leeds Rhinos	2	2008
Chris Melling	Wigan Warriors	1	2007
Danny Orr	Wigan Warriors	3	2009
Sione Faumuina	North Queensland Cowboys	3	2009
Joe Walsh	Leeds Rhinos	2	2008
Andy Smith	Bradford Bulls	1	2007
Richard Villasanti	Cronulla Sharks	2	2008
Luke Burgess	Leeds Rhinos	loan	2007
Joe Mbu	Doncaster	1	2007
Rikki Sheriffe	Doncaster	1	2007
Steve Bannister	St. Helens	3	2009

Losses

Losses
Player	Signed for	When left
Luke Dorn	Salford City Reds	2006
Danny Williams	Retirement	2006
Pat Weisner	Hull Kingston Rovers	2006
Nick Bradley-Qalilawa	Manly Sea Eagles	2006
Neil Budworth	Celtic Crusaders	2006
Thomas Leuluai	Wigan Warriors	2006
Mark Tookey	Manly Sea Eagles coaching position	2006
Filimone Lolohea	Released	2006
Joe Mbu	Doncaster	2006
Rikki Sheriffe	Doncaster	2006
Paul Noone	Widnes Vikings	2006
Ade Adebisi	Doncaster	2006
Anthony Stewart	Leigh Centurions	2006
Tim Hartley	Halifax	2006
Sione Faumuina	North Queensland Cowboys	2006
/ Solomon Haumono	Returned to boxing	2006
Richard Villasanti	Retirement due to injury	2007

== 2008 Gains & losses ==
Re-Signings

Re-Signings
Player	Until the end of
Chris Melling	2009
Matt Gafa	2008
Karl Temata	2008
Jon Grayshon	2008
Rikki Sheriffe	2008
Henry Paul	2008
Chad Randall	2009

2008 Losses

Losses
Player	Signed for	Fee
Lee Hopkins	Retiring	n/a
Paul Sykes	Bradford Bulls	undisclosed
Tyrone Smith	CA Brumbies	released
David Mills	Hull Kingston Rovers	released
Andy Smith	unknown	released

2008 Gains

Gains
Player	Signed from	Fee
Henry Fa'afili	Warrington Wolves	out of contract
Gareth Haggerty	Salford City Reds	pre-contract agreement
Danny Ward	Hull Kingston Rovers	out of contract
