= 2006 Harlequins Rugby League season =

- Super League XI Rank: 7th
- Challenge Cup: Quarter-final
- 2006 record: Wins: 13; draws: 1; losses: 17
- Points scored: For: 704; against: 873

Team information
- Chairman: David Hughes & Ian Lenagan
- Coach: Tony Rea
- Stadium: The Stoop
- Avg. attendance: 4,642
- High attendance: 12,301

Top scorers
- Tries: Luke Dorn - 18
- Goals: Henry Paul - 42
- Points: Henry Paul - 89
Home colours	Away colours
← 2005	List of seasons	2007 →

The 2006 Harlequins Rugby League season was the twenty-seventh in the club's history, their eleventh season in the Super League and the first as the rebranded Harlequins Rugby League. The club was coached by Tony Rea, competing in Super League XI, finishing in 7th place. The club also got to the quarter-finals round of the Challenge Cup.

== Super League XI table ==
Pos	Team	Pld	W	D	L	PF	PA	PD	Pts	Qualification
1	St Helens (L, C)	28	24	0	4	939	430	+509	48	Semi-final
2	Hull F.C.	28	20	0	8	720	578	+142	40	Semi-final
3	Leeds Rhinos	28	19	0	9	869	543	+326	38	Elimination play-offs
4	Bradford Bulls	28	16	2	10	802	568	+234	32 (Note: Bradford deducted 2 points for salary cap breaches in 2005.)	Elimination play-offs
5	Salford City Reds	28	13	0	15	600	539	+61	26	Elimination play-offs
6	Warrington Wolves	28	13	0	15	743	721	+22	26	Elimination play-offs
7	Harlequins	28	11	1	16	556	823	−267	23	
8	Wigan Warriors	28	12	0	16	644	715	−71	22 (Note: Wigan deducted 2 points for salary cap breaches in 2005.)	
9	Huddersfield Giants	28	11	0	17	609	753	−144	22	
10	Wakefield Trinity Wildcats	28	10	0	18	591	717	−126	20	
11	Castleford Tigers (R)	28	9	1	18	575	968	−393	19	Relegation to National League One
12	Catalans Dragons (X)	28	8	0	20	601	894	−293	16	

Source: Rugby League Project
Rules for classification: 1) Points; 2) Points difference; 3) Number of points scored;
(C) Champions; (L) League Leaders' Shield Winners; (R) Relegated; (X) Exempt from relegation

== 2006 Challenge Cup ==
Quins RL were knocked out in the quarter-finals by the Leeds Rhinos at Headingley for the second successive year.

Round	Home	Score	Away	Match Information
Round	Home	Score	Away	Date and Time	Venue	Attendance
Fourth round	Harlequins RL	48-6	Toulouse Olympique	2 April 2006	The Stoop	3,917
Fifth round	Harlequins RL	82-8	Barrow Raiders	21 May 2006	The Stoop	1,512
Quarter-finals	Leeds Rhinos	36-18	Harlequins RL	4 June 2006	Headingley	5,332

== 2006 Harlequins Rugby League squad ==
Squad Number	Name	International country	Position	Age	Previous club	Appearances	Tries	Goals	Drop Goals	Points
1	Mark McLinden	(Australia)	Fullback	27	Canberra Raiders	19	14	0	1	57
2	Jon Wells	(England)	Wing	27	Wakefield Trinity Wildcats	6	1	0	0	4
3	Paul Sykes	(England)	Centre	25	Bradford Bulls	8	2	8	0	24
4	Tyrone Smith	(Tonga)	Centre	23	Sydney Roosters	30	9	0	0	36
5	Nick Bradley-Qalilawa	(Fiji)	Wing	26	Manly Sea Eagles	30	9	0	0	36
6	Luke Dorn	(Australia)	Stand-off	24	Sydney Roosters	27	18	0	0	72
7	Tommy Leuluai	(New Zealand)	Scrum-half	21	New Zealand Warriors	18	7	0	0	28
8	Karl Temata	(Cook Islands)	Prop	28	New Zealand Warriors	12	1	0	0	4
9	Neil Budworth	(Wales)	Hooker	24	Wigan Warriors	23	0	0	0	0
10	Daniel Heckenberg	(Scotland)	Prop	26	Manly Sea Eagles	25	1	0	0	4
11	Solomon Haumono	(Tonga)	Second-row	30	Manly Sea Eagles	21	6	0	0	24
12	Lee Hopkins	(Australia)	Second-row	28	Penrith Panthers	26	8	0	0	32
13	Rob Purdham	(England)	Loose forward	26	Whitehaven	26	4	32	0	80
14	Danny Williams	(Ireland)	Second-row	33	Melbourne Storm	25	4	0	0	16
15	David Mills	(Wales)	Prop	25	Widnes Vikings	30	2	0	0	8
16	Joe Mbu	(Zaire)	Second-row	22	Doncaster Lakers	16	2	0	0	8
17	Mark Tookey	(Australia)	Prop	29	Castleford Tigers	29	1	0	0	4
18	Matt Gafa	(Malta)	Centre	28	Canberra Raiders	24	4	19	0	54
19	Tony Clubb	(England)	Wing	19	London Broncos Academy	7	4	0	0	16
20	Fili Lolohea	(Tonga)	Prop	27	South Sydney Rabbitohs	11	0	0	0	0
21	Tim Hartley	(England)	Stand-off	20	Salford City Reds	3	3	0	0	12
22	Rikki Sheriffe	(England)	Wing	22	Halifax	4	2	0	0	8
23	Chad Randall	(Australia)	Hooker	25	Manly Sea Eagles	25	7	0	0	28
24	Pat Weisner	(Ireland)	Hooker	24	Halifax	19	7	0	0	28
25	Zeb Luisi	(Niue)	Fullback	21	London Broncos Academy	24	4	0	0	16
26	Louie McCarthy-Scarsbrook	(England)	Second-row	20	London Broncos Academy	5	0	0	0	0
27	Henry Paul	(New Zealand)	Stand-off	32	Gloucester Rugby	17	1	42	1	89
28	Michael Worrincy	(England)	Second-row	20	London Broncos Academy	6	4	0	0	16
29	Paul Noone	(England)	Second-row	25	Warrington Wolves	7	0	0	0	0
30	Tony Stewart	(Ireland)	Wing	27	Salford City Reds	4	0	0	0	0
