= 2005 London Broncos season =

- Super League X Rank: 6th
- Challenge Cup: Quarter-final
- 2005 record: Wins: 15; draws: 2; losses: 15
- Points scored: For: 908; against: 766

Team information
- Chairman: David Hughes & Ian Lenagan
- Coach: Tony Rea
- Captain: Lee Hopkins & Mark McLinden
- Stadium: Griffin Park
- Avg. attendance: 4,006
- High attendance: 6,500

Top scorers
- Tries: Luke Dorn - 24
- Goals: Paul Sykes - 133
- Points: Paul Sykes - 320
Home colours	Away colours
← 2004	List of seasons	2006 →

The 2005 London Broncos season was the twenty-sixth in the club's history and their tenth season in the Super League. The club was coached by Tony Rea, competing in Super League X, finishing in 6th place and competing in the end of season play-offs. The club also got to the Quarter-finals round of the Challenge Cup.

== Super League X table ==
Pos	Team	Pld	W	D	L	PF	PA	PD	Pts	Qualification or relegation
1	St Helens	28	23	1	4	1028	537	+491	47	Semi Final
2	Leeds Rhinos	28	22	0	6	1152	505	+647	44	Semi Final
3	Bradford Bulls	28	18	1	9	1038	684	+354	37	Elimination Semi Final
4	Warrington Wolves	28	18	0	10	792	702	+90	36	Elimination Semi Final
5	Hull F.C.	28	15	2	11	756	670	+86	32	Elimination Semi Final
6	London Broncos	28	13	2	13	800	718	+82	28	Elimination Semi Final
7	Wigan Warriors	28	14	0	14	698	718	−20	28	
8	Huddersfield Giants	28	12	0	16	742	791	−49	24	
9	Salford City Reds	28	11	0	17	549	732	−183	22	
10	Wakefield Trinity Wildcats	28	10	0	18	716	999	−283	20	
11	Widnes Vikings	28	6	1	21	598	1048	−450	13	Relegation to National League One
12	Leigh Centurions	28	2	1	25	445	1210	−765	5	Relegation to National League One

Source: Rugby League Project
Rules for classification: 1) Points; 2) Points difference; 3) Number of points scored;

== Super League X play-offs ==
Elimination play-offs
3	Bradford Bulls	44
6	London Broncos	22
4	Warrington Wolves	6
5	Hull F.C.	40

Qualifying/Elimination semifinal
1	St. Helens	16
2	Leeds Rhinos	19
Bradford Bulls	71
Hull F.C.	0

Elimination final
St. Helens	18
Bradford Bulls	23

Grand Final
Leeds Rhinos	6
Bradford Bulls	15

== 2005 Challenge Cup ==
The Broncos progressed beyond the fifth round stage of the cup for the first time in five years, before being knocked out in the quarter finals by the Leeds Rhinos.

Round	Home	Score	Away	Match Information
Round	Home	Score	Away	Date and Time	Venue	Attendance
Fourth round	Hunslet Hawks	4-70	London Broncos	3 April 2005	South Leeds Stadium	450
Fifth round	Salford City Reds	12-26	London Broncos	8 May 2005	The Willows	2,339
Quarter-finals	Leeds Rhinos	32-12	London Broncos	24 June 2005	Headingley	9,444

== 2005 London Broncos squad ==
Squad Number	Name	International country	Position	Age	Previous club	Appearances	Tries	Goals	Drop Goals	Points
1	Paul Sykes	(England)	Centre	24	Bradford Bulls	32	13	133	2	320
2	Jon Wells	(England)	Wing	27	Wakefield Trinity Wildcats	27	14	0	0	56
3	Nick Bradley-Qalilawa	(Fiji)	Wing	25	Manly Sea Eagles	31	20	0	0	80
4	Mark O'Halloran	(United States)	Centre	24	Wests Tigers	18	4	0	0	16
5	John Kirkpatrick	(England)	Wing	26	St Helens	5	5	0	0	20
6	Mark McLinden	(Australia)	Fullback	27	Canberra Raiders	27	9	0	0	36
7	Tommy Leuluai	(New Zealand)	Scrum-half	20	New Zealand Warriors	22	14	0	0	56
8	Francis Stephenson	(England)	Prop	29	Wigan Warriors	16	0	0	0	0
9	Neil Budworth	(Wales)	Hooker	23	Wigan Warriors	4	0	0	0	0
10	Steve Trindall	(Australia)	Prop	32	Wests Tigers	27	1	0	0	4
11	Solomon Haumono	(Tonga)	Second-row	29	Manly Sea Eagles	32	11	0	0	44
12	Lee Hopkins	(Australia)	Second-row	27	Penrith Panthers	32	7	0	0	28
13	Rob Purdham	(England)	Loose forward	25	Whitehaven	22	10	1	0	42
14	Danny Williams	(Ireland)	Second-row	32	Melbourne Storm	20	0	0	0	0
15	Mitch Stringer	(Scotland)	Prop	21	London Broncos Academy	2	0	0	0	0
16	Joe Mbu	(Zaire)	Second-row	21	London Broncos Academy	23	1	0	0	4
17	Mark Tookey	(Australia)	Prop	28	Castleford Tigers	30	5	0	0	20
18	Anthony Armour	(Australia)	Prop	22	Penrith Panthers	19	1	0	0	4
19	Dave Highton	(Wales)	Hooker	25	Salford City Reds	25	1	0	0	4
20	Fili Lolohea	(Tonga)	Prop	26	South Sydney Rabbitohs	25	0	0	0	0
21	Luke Dorn	(Australia)	Stand-off	23	Sydney Roosters	31	24	0	0	96
22	Lee Sanderson	(England)	Scrum-half	20	Leigh Centurions	0	0	0	0	0
23	Lee Greenwood	(England)	Wing	24	Halifax	7	6	0	0	24
24	Tryone Smith	(Tonga)	Centre	22	Sydney Roosters	26	12	0	0	48
25	Zeb Luisi	(Niue)	Fullback	21	London Broncos Academy	19	6	0	0	24
26	Carl Ablett	(England)	Second-row	19	Leeds Rhinos	5	0	0	0	0
27	Karl Temata	(Cook Islands)	Prop	27	New Zealand Warriors	3	1	0	0	4
28	Michael Worrincy	(England)	Second-row	19	London Broncos Academy	0	0	0	0	0
29	Ade Adebisi	(Nigeria)	Wing	19	London Broncos Academy	0	0	0	0	8
30	Feleti Mateo	(Tonga)	Stand-off	21	Parramatta Eels	14	1	0	0	4
31	Louie McCarthy-Scarsbrook	(England)	Second-row	19	London Broncos Academy	0	0	0	0	0
