= Michael Worrincy =

English rugby league footballer

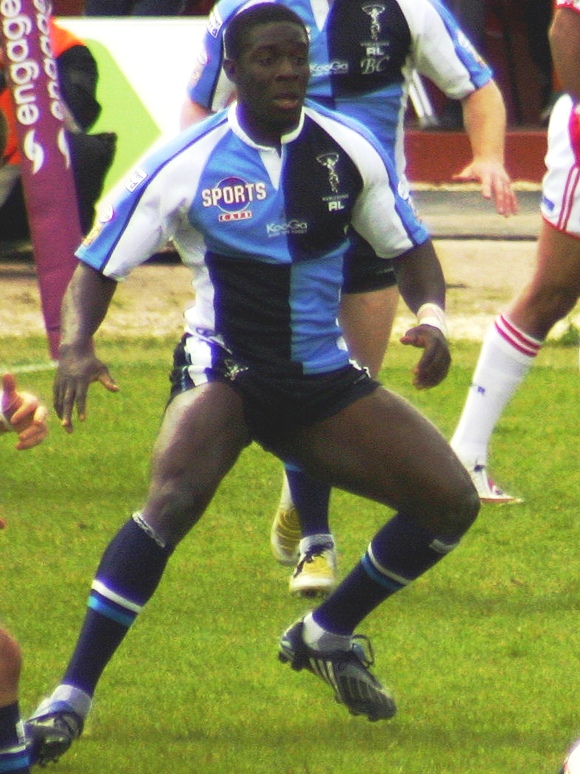

Personal information
- Born: 16 February 1986 (age 40) Leeds, West Yorkshire, England
- Height: 6 ft 1 in (1.85 m)
- Weight: 15 st 5 lb (98 kg)

Playing information
- Position: Second-row
Club
Years	Team	Pld	T	G	FG	P
2005–08	Harlequins RL	34	11	0	0	44
2009–10	Bradford Bulls	49	12	0	0	48
2011	Penrith Panthers	0	0	0	0	0
2012	Leigh Centurions	7	3	0	0	12
2012–16	London Skolars	57	18	0	0	72
2017	Doncaster	1	0	0	0	0
	Total	148	44	0	0	176
- Source: As of 12 June 2026
- Relatives: Rob Worrincy (brother)

Michael "Mikey" Worrincy (born 16 February 1986) also known by the nickname of "Black Pearl", is an English rugby league player for the London Skolars in the Kingstone Press Championship 1. He has previously played for the Harlequins RL, the Leigh and the Bradford Bulls in the Super League, and with the Penrith Panthers in the NRL. He is the younger brother of Halifax, and Wales international Rob Worrincy.

2007 saw Worrincy move to prop. Brian McDermott has also used Worrincy as a second-row. However his favoured playing position is as a loose forward.

He is of Nigerian and Welsh descent, and was brought up in London.

== Early career ==
Worrincy was 16 years old when he began playing for London Broncos academy side after signing from the Greenwich Admirals. He attended sixth form at Charlton Athletic FC as part of the London Broncos academy Worrincy toured Australia with British Amateur Rugby League Association U18s. Worrincy spent the 2005 season further developing his skills whilst on loan with Hull FC's U21 academy side together with fellow loanee Louie McCarthy-Scarsbrook played an important role in Hull's U21 Grand Final success.

== 2006 season ==
In 2006 Harlequins Rugby League struggled for form and additionally had an injury crisis with 15 players unavailable and there were calls for the club's best youngsters to appear. Worrincy and Louis McCarthy-Scarsbrook were considered for the home game against Leeds, yet it was two months later before Worrincy finally made his début for the senior squad after coming off the bench against Bradford Bulls in the 58–16 defeat on 13 May 2006.

Worrincy made his second senior appearance as a substitute on 29 May in a historic 29–28 victory over Salford City Reds with Henry Paul kicking over a drop-goal in the 79th minutes to secure the two points.

On 10 June, Worrincy traded the number 17 jumper for a starting position in the second row against Warrington. In an exciting game Worrincy charged on to the ball from 40 yards out and ran brilliantly through the defence to register his first ever four points for the club. Quins RL won 30–28 with Warrington scoring three tries in the last twelve minutes to bring the sides close despite a dominant performance.

Worrincy's last appearance of the season came in round 22 when Harlequins defeated Hull F.C. 18–16 in another close game. Similar to Worrincy's previous appearance the opposition ran in three late tries.

== 2007 season ==
In the 2007 season, Worrincy returned from a serious leg injury to play a role in the first three games of the season. He came off the substitutes bench against St. Helens away on 9 February in a 14–6 win; stayed on the bench for the round two game against Salford which was an 18–18 draw and played as a starting Prop in the away 26–10 win versus Hull Kingston Rovers.

Despite these strong performances Worrincy was dropped into the academy. The club preferred Temata, Heckenberg, Mills and McCarthy-Scarsbrook as the starting and impact props. In the second row Lee Hopkins and Rob Purdham played almost every game, with Jonny Grayshon covering that position from the bench. At loose forward perhaps the two highest-earners at the club Scott Hill and Henry Paul were competing for a position after both were displaced at half-back by McLinden and Orr.

Many Quins supporters were disappointed that Worrincy was not selected during this period and some were shocked when Brian McDermott decided to sign Luke Burgess on loan and play him straightaway. Additionally former Leeds Academy forwards Joe Walsh and Dave Tootill started to be named in the twenty-man squad whilst Worrincy was left out.

Given this context, it was a surprise when Worrincy reappeared in rounds 11 and 12 having seemingly drifted out of favour. He started on the bench in the heavy defeats at Huddersfield on 22 April (46–16) and again on 29 April 2007 (a 6–44 home loss) versus St. Helens. These were the two heaviest defeats of the season and Mike quickly found himself out of favour despite it being obvious that others had played poorly.

During his time on the sidelines he obtained his first personal sponsorship in June 2007, with Kate Raymond sponsoring him for home games and Mark Rammond sponsoring him away from home (cited in Harlequins RL matchday programme).

A spate of injuries in the side including Purdham, Heckenberg, Paul and Hill saw Worrincy return to play rounds 15, 16, 17 and 18. He found himself on the bench in the heavy 44–18 loss away at the Bradford Bulls. However he started at second row for the excellent home victory over the Wigan Warriors (18–8). He also featured in the away Rugby League Challenge Cup defeat at Wigan the following week and then played in the second-row for the historic first ever Super League try-less game where Quins lost 5–2 away at the Salford City Reds.

He then played against the Hull Kingston Rovers as a starting prop on 30 June 2007 where he was instrumental in the 32–18 win, scoring the first try of the game from five metres out and his own first try of the season. The following Saturday he appeared against Catalans Dragons who dominated the early stages of the game with their awesome size and strength combining with gallic flair to dominate the match but ultimately Quins went on to record a 30–22 victory. However, although Worrincy made the 18 for the following game against Hull away he found himself yet again out of favour. Although Quins RL were 8–0 up after only 13 minutes, they consistently gave away penalties to go in 8–8 at the break following four conversions from Danny Tickle. In the second half Quins conceded further two further tries and scored no points whatsoever despite having four consecutive series of possession followed quickly by another three.

It seems that Quins RL have not always noticed the correlation between the selection of Worrincy and the positivity of the result.

Worrincy is the younger brother of former Academy star Rob Worrincy, who became a journeyman in the 2007 season with appearances for Leeds Metropolitan University, a trial with 2006 Grand Finalists Hull FC, and then returned to Sheffield Eagles, where his previous final appearance has seemed to be in the National League Grand Final where he scored a length of the field try.

Worrincy plays in the pack, primarily as a lock or in the second row of the scrum.

The prop was selected to play for the Harlequins Rugby Union side for the Middlesex Sevens at Twickenham Stadium. He guested for club's sister rugby union team in the tournament as Tony Clubb was called on to replace the unavailable Paul Sykes in the match against Wigan.

== 2008 ==
Worrincy signed for Bradford Bulls on 25 September 2008.

== 2010 ==
On 12 November 2010 it was announced Worrincy had signed for Penrith Panthers. On 12 November 2010, he successfully agreed terms with Penrith and became the 4th former Bradford Bulls player (Sam Burgess, George Burgess, Mark Flanagan, and Michael Worrincy) to play in Australia.

== 2012 ==
Worrincy initially began the season at Leigh. But shortly into the season Worrincy transferred to the London Skolars in Championship 1. In early July it was revealed that Worrincy had his contracted terminated with Skolars as he had been offer trials with Rugby Union side London Irish. The London Skolars coaching staff said positive things about him and hopes that he will rejoin the club s at a later date. Should Worrincy get into the London Irish team he would be playing in the top flight of English rugby union, the Aviva Premiership.
