= MBU =

Mbu may refer to:

== People ==
- Joe Mbu, rugby league coach
- Joe Mbu (footballer), Scottish footballer
- Joey Mbu, American football player
- Joseph Mbu, Nigerian rugby union player
- Matthew Mbu, Nigerian politician

== Fish ==
- Mbu pufferfish, freshwater pufferfish

== Other ==
- Macintosh Business Unit, Division of Microsoft
- Marble Blast Ultra, a video game for Xbox 360
- MRC Mitochondrial Biology Unit, a mitochondrial research centre in Cambridge
- Scotch MBU {Master Broadcast U-Matic}, a brand of U-matic video tape
