= Worrincy =

Worrincy is a surname. Notable people with the surname include:

- Michael Worrincy (born 1986), English rugby player
- Rob Worrincy (born 1985), English rugby player
