= Joe Mbu =

Joe Mbu may refer to:

- Joe Mbu (footballer) (born 1982), Cameroonian retired semi-professional footballer
- Joe Mbu (rugby league) (born 1983), Congolese former professional rugby league footballer and coach

== See also ==
- Joseph Mbu (born 1981), Nigerian-born English rugby union player
- Joey Mbu (born 1993), American former professional football nose tackle
