= Filimone =

Filimone is a given name and surname. Notable people with the name include:

- Filimone Lolohea (born 1979), New Zealand rugby league footballer
- Siueni Filimone (born 1994), Tongan sprinter
