= Chris Melling =

Chris Melling may refer to:

- Chris Melling (rugby league)
- Chris Melling (pool player)
