= Zebastian =

Zebastian is a given name. Notable people with the name include:

- Zebastian Lucky Luisi (born 1984), New Zealand rugby league footballer
- Zebastian Modin (born 1994), Swedish skier and biathlete

== See also ==
- Sebastian (name)
