= Purdham =

Purdham is a surname, and may refer to:

- Garry Purdham (1978–2010), English professional rugby league player
- Rob Purdham (born 1980), English professional rugby league player
- Mary Ellen Kimball-Purdham (born 1929), All-American Girls Professional Baseball League player
