= Rob Worrincy =

English rugby footballer

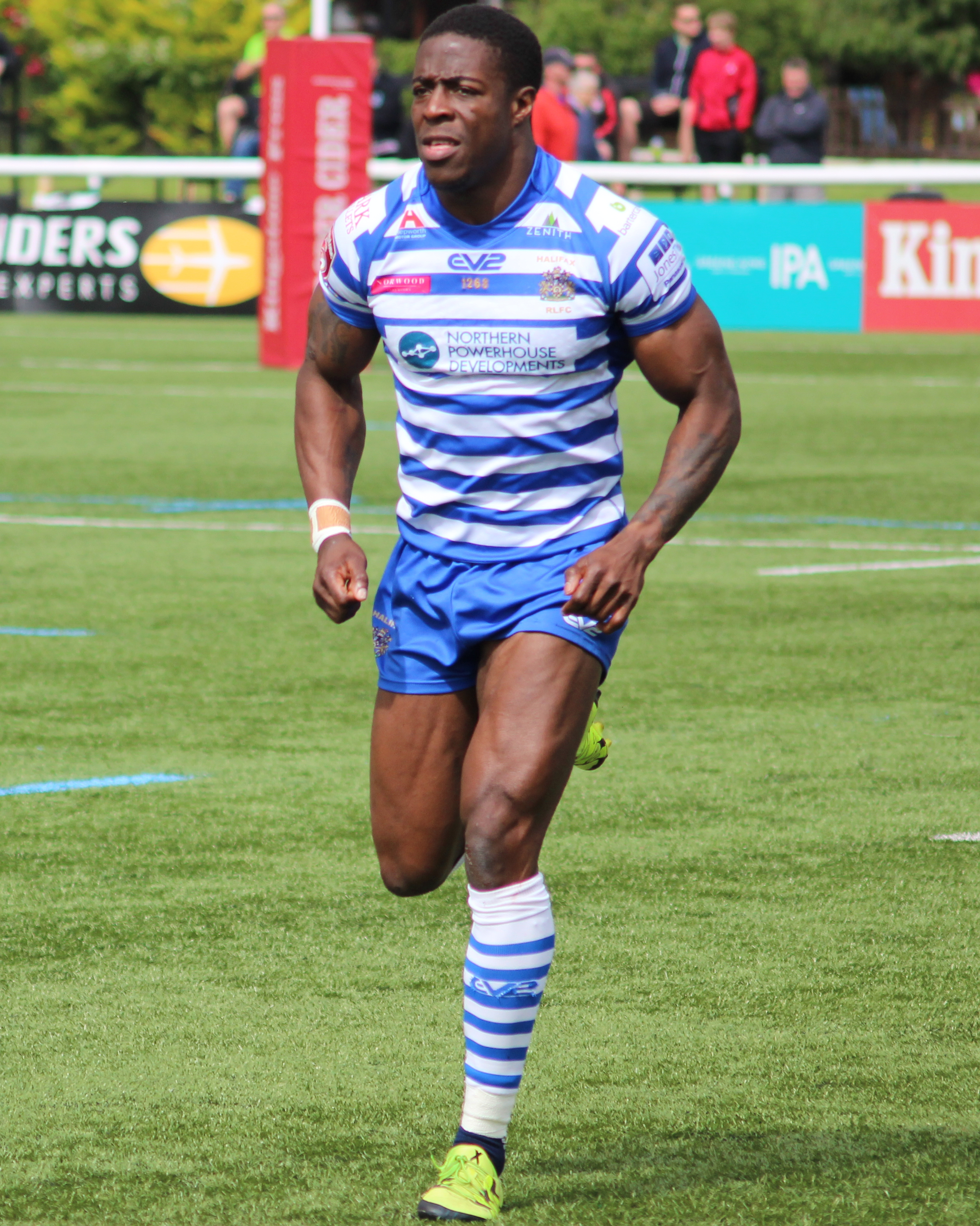

Personal information
- Full name: Robert Worrincy
- Born: 9 July 1985 (age 41) Leeds, West Yorkshire, England
- Height: 6 ft 2 in (1.88 m)
- Weight: 15 st 0 lb (95 kg)

Playing information

Rugby league
- Position: Wing
Club
Years	Team	Pld	T	G	FG	P
2003	London Broncos	0	0	0	0	0
2004–05	Castleford Tigers	1	0	0	0	0
2005–06	Sheffield Eagles	30	12	0	0	48
2007	Halifax	0	0	0	0	0
2007–08	Sheffield Eagles	27	15	0	0	60
2009–14	Halifax	117	96	0	0	384
2015–16	Sheffield Eagles	76	58	0	0	232
2017	Halifax	27	8	0	0	32
2018–19	Dewsbury Rams	42	23	0	0	92
2020–21	Sheffield Eagles	20	8	0	0	32
2022	Rochdale Hornets	10	6	0	0	24
2023	Hunslet RLFC	0	0	0	0	0
	Total	350	226	0	0	904

Rugby union
- Position: Wing
Club
Years	Team	Pld	T	G	FG	P
2006–07	Doncaster
- Source: As of 18 August 2023
- Relatives: Michael Worrincy (brother)

Robert Worrincy (born 9 July 1985) is an English former rugby league footballer who last played as winger for Hunslet RLFC in RFL League 1.

He previously played in the Super League for the Castleford Tigers, and in the second tier for the Sheffield Eagles over three separate spells, two separate spells at Halifax in the second tier, as well as the Dewsbury Rams in the RFL Championship. Worrincy also spent time as a rugby union footballer, playing a season as a winger for Doncaster in the second tier of English rugby union.

== Background ==
Worrincy was born in Leeds, West Yorkshire, England. He is of Anglo-Nigerian-Welsh heritage. He began playing rugby league in the London area, and won the BARLA Youth Player of the Year Award in 2003.

He is the elder brother of the rugby league player; Michael Worrincy.

== Career ==
In 2004, he made his profession debut for Castleford Tigers in the Super League. He went on to have multiple spells with the Sheffield Eagles and Halifax in the Kingstone Press Championship.

In March 2014, Worrincy was suspended for six months after breaching the Rugby Football League's rules on betting. The ban was extended to nine months following a failed appeal.

In November 2017 he signed to play for Dewsbury Rams.

In 2021, while at Sheffield, Worrincy announced his retirement from the game. He scored a try in the last minute of his final game in 78-10 loss at Featherstone Rovers.

In May 2022, Worrincy came out of retirement and signed for Rochdale Hornets.

On 18 August 2023 it was announced that he had received a three-year doping ban by UKAD.
