= Anthony Armour =

Australian rugby league footballer (born 1982)

Personal information
- Full name: Anthony Armour
- Born: 12 October 1982 (age 42); Merrylands, New South Wales, Australia

Playing information
- Position: Prop
Club
Years	Team	Pld	T	G	FG	P
2005	London Broncos	19	1	0	0	4

Anthony Armour is a rugby league footballer, he played for London Broncos in the Super League.

A Parramatta junior, Armour played reserve grade rugby league for the St Marys-Penrith Cougars, and appeared for the club in the 2003 NSWRL Premier League Grand Final. He later moved to England to join London Broncos for the 2005 season. He scored his only try for the club in a 74–6 win against Wakefield Trinity Wildcats.
