= Richard Villasanti =

Australia international rugby league footballer

Personal information
- Full name: Richard Villasanti
- Born: 20 May 1980 (age 46) Canberra, Australian Capital Territory, Australia

Playing information
- Height: 187 cm (6 ft 2 in)
- Weight: 111 kg (17 st 7 lb)
- Position: Prop
Club
Years	Team	Pld	T	G	FG	P
1999	Balmain Tigers	6	1	0	0	4
2000	Wests Tigers	7	1	0	0	4
2001–06	New Zealand Warriors	96	21	0	0	84
2006	Cronulla Sharks	7	1	0	0	4
	Total	116	24	0	0	96
Representative
Years	Team	Pld	T	G	FG	P
2003	Australia	1	0	0	0	0

Richard Villasanti (born 20 May 1980) is an Australian former professional rugby league footballer who played in 1990s and 2000s. An Australia national representative forward, he played his club football in the National Rugby League for Balmain, Wests Tigers, New Zealand Warriors, and Cronulla-Sutherland.

== Playing career ==
Villasanti made his début with the Balmain Tigers in 1999, making 6 appearances from the bench. He remained with the club when they merged to become the Wests Tigers the next season and made a number of appearances in the team towards the end of the year. A Junior Kiwi, Villasanti was included in the wider Tonga squad for the 2000 World Cup but did not play in the tournament.

Joining the Warriors in 2001, Villasanti was a regular in the team for the next 5 years. The following year, he was in the team that made the 2002 NRL Grand Final, the club's first grand final appearance. He gained a level of infamy for a tackle made in the game, a "head-first hit, which left Fittler bloodied and bandaged."

At the end of the 2003 NRL season Villasanti had gained a reputation as a big-hitting impact player, and became the first New Zealand based player to be chosen to represent Australia at the end of the year, though he was to make only one test appearance on the 2003 Kangaroo tour of Great Britain and France, helping Australia to victory over Great Britain in what would be the last time the two nations contested an Ashes series. While on tour with Australia, Villasanti was accused of stealing more than $5000 from teammates rooms. An investigation by the Australian Rugby League (ARL) did not determine who the thief was but Villasanti claims other teammates blamed him for the stolen items.

In 2006, Villasanti was released from the Warriors mid-season, and joined the Cronulla-Sutherland Sharks.

In February 2007, he secured a release from Cronulla, signing a two-year deal with Harlequins RL but never played a first-grade game for the London-based club. Villasanti was signed by the Londoners as a replacement for Solomon Haumono after having surgery on his knee in Australia. He passed a medical on his arrival in London and was expected to be available after four to six weeks, but the knee failed to respond to rehabilitation. The persistent knee problem forced him into retirement.

Villasanti signed with the Sawtell Panthers in the Group 2 competition for 2011 in which he won a premiership. In mid-2012, he signed with the Bidgee Hurricanes in the Group 20 competition.

== Career highlights ==
- Junior Club: Erindale College, Canberra
- First Grade Debut: Round 7, Balmain v Manly at Leichhardt Oval, 18 April 1999
- First Grade Record: 116 appearances scoring 24 tries

== Representative games ==
- International: One game for Australia in 2003
