= Joseph Mbu =

Nigerian rugby union player

Joe Mbu
- Born: Joseph Mbu; 24 December 1981 (age 44) Nigeria
- Height: 6 ft 1 in (1.85 m)
- Weight: 16 st 7 lb (105 kg)
- School: King's School, Bruton
- University: University of the West of England

Rugby union career
- Position: Wing
- Current team: US Dax
Senior career
Years	Team	Apps	(Points)
- Bristol
- Bath
2004 - 05	Harlequins		
2005 - 06	London Wasps	5	(0)
2006 - 07	Pau	25	(60)
2007 -	US Dax	4	(10)

Joseph Mbu (born 24 December 1981) is a Nigerian-born English rugby union player who played most recently for US Dax in the Top 14 competition in France. Joe Mbu's position of choice is on the wing.

He has previously played for Bristol, Bath, Harlequins, London Wasps and Pau.

After retiring from rugby due to injury, Joe decided to turn his hand to fundraising on an epic scale.

The Joedy Memorial Hospital

On 29 March 2013 Joe embarked upon a huge challenge - to run solo from Lands End to John O'Groats to raise money for a hospital built by his grandfather M.T. Mbu in Okundi, Western Nigeria. The hospital was built in 1998 in memory of his late father and uncle and called The Joedy Memorial Hospital. Originally built as a maternity hospital, it soon found itself treating everyone who came through its doors. It is now in great need of refurbishment as well as ongoing financial support to ensure that there is free medical treatment available for everyone in the surrounding area. Joe is trying to raise £100,000 through his UK contacts and about £500,000 worldwide. Within the first 8 days, Joe had run 210 miles and had already reached Bristol.
