= Paul Sykes (rugby league) =

Former GB & England international rugby league footballer

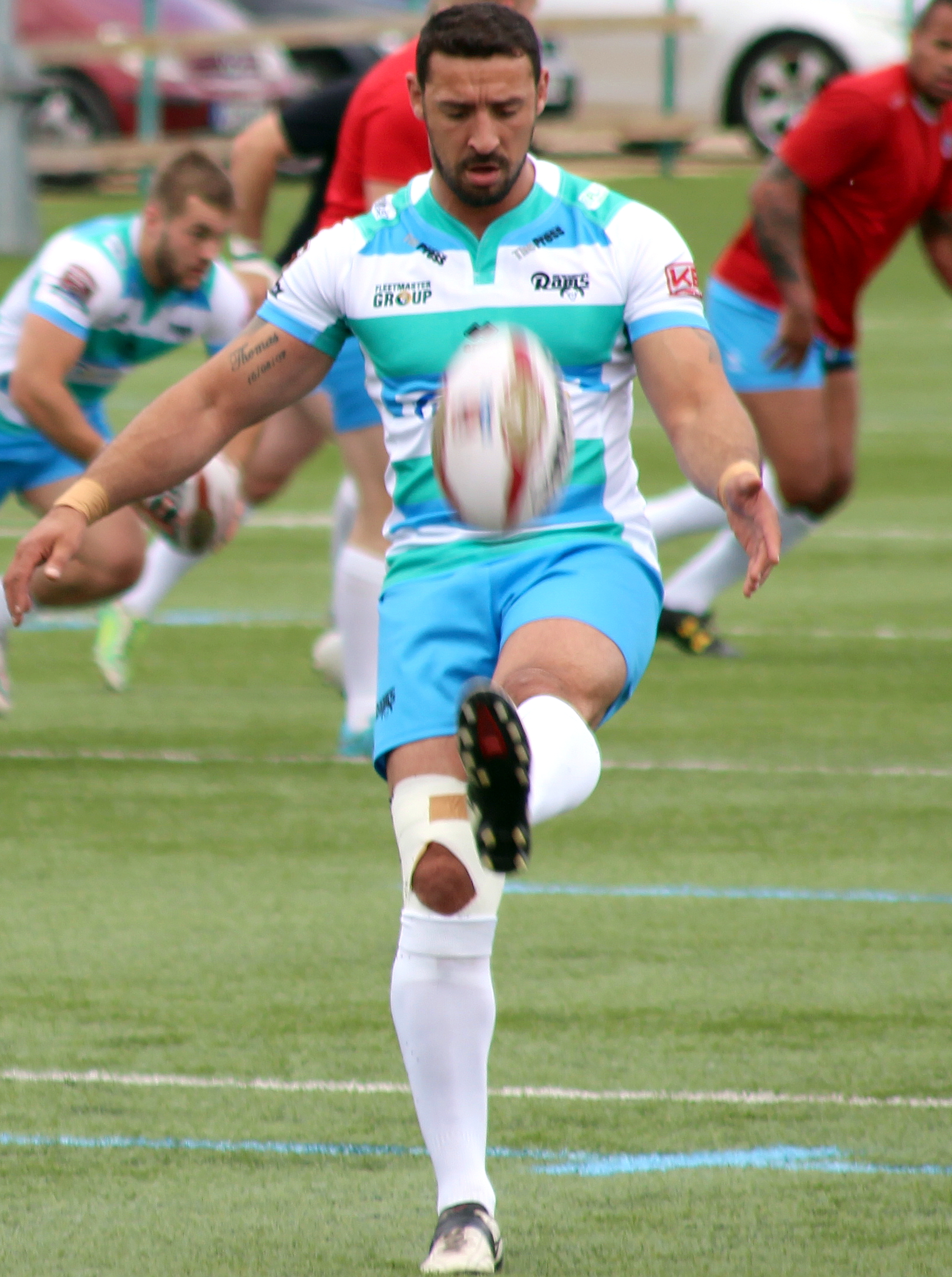

Personal information
- Full name: Paul Sykes
- Born: 11 August 1981 (age 45) Dewsbury, West Yorkshire, England
- Height: 5 ft 10 in (1.78 m)
- Weight: 14 st 7 lb (92 kg)

Playing information

Rugby league
- Position: Fullback, Centre, Stand-off
Club
Years	Team	Pld	T	G	FG	P
1999–02	Bradford Bulls	9	2	3	0	14
2001(loan)	→ London Broncos	9	1	23	1	51
2002–07	London Broncos	128	48	263	3	721
2008–12	Bradford Bulls	100	36	72	2	290
2012(loan)	→ Wakefield Trinity	22	3	73	3	161
2013–14	Wakefield Trinity	40	9	65	3	169
2015	Featherstone Rovers	34	18	104	0	280
2016–26	Dewsbury Rams	197	31	486	9	1105
	Total	539	148	1089	21	2791
Representative
Years	Team	Pld	T	G	FG	P
2005–09	England	5	2	6	0	20
2007	Great Britain	1	1	0	0	4

Rugby union
Club
Years	Team	Pld	T	G	FG	P
1999(loan)	Wakefield RFC	1	0	0	0	0

Coaching information
Club
Years	Team	Gms	W	D	L	W%
2022 (Interim)	Dewsbury Rams	2	0	0	2	0
- Source: As of 24 March 2024

Paul Sykes (born 11 August 1981) is an English professional rugby league footballer who plays as a stand-off for the Dewsbury Rams in the RFL Championship.

Sykes came through the ranks at Bradford Bulls making his debut in 1999. He left the Bulls in 2002 for London Broncos before resigning for them in 2008. Sykes also spent time at Wakefield Trinity and Featherstone Rovers.

Sykes made his debut for England national team in 2005 and also went on to represent Great Britain.

In 2022, he was appointed interim head-coach at Dewsbury Rams following the departure of Lee Greenwood.

At age 44, he is the oldest English professional rugby league player playing for Dewsbury Rams in League 1. In 2025, Reilly made rugby league world history, playing an outstanding 27 seasons.

On 28 March 2026 he was inducted into the RFL Roll of Honour

== Background ==
Sykes was born in Dewsbury, West Yorkshire, England.

== Playing career ==
=== Bradford ===
Paul Sykes is a product of Bradford Bulls academy, making his breakthrough in the 1999 Bradford season during 1999's Super League IV. However opportunities at Odsal Stadium were limited and so Sykes went on loan spells at London in both the 2001 and 2002 seasons.

In his first spell at Bradford Bulls, he was loaned out to Wakefield RFC for which he played one game of Rugby Union.

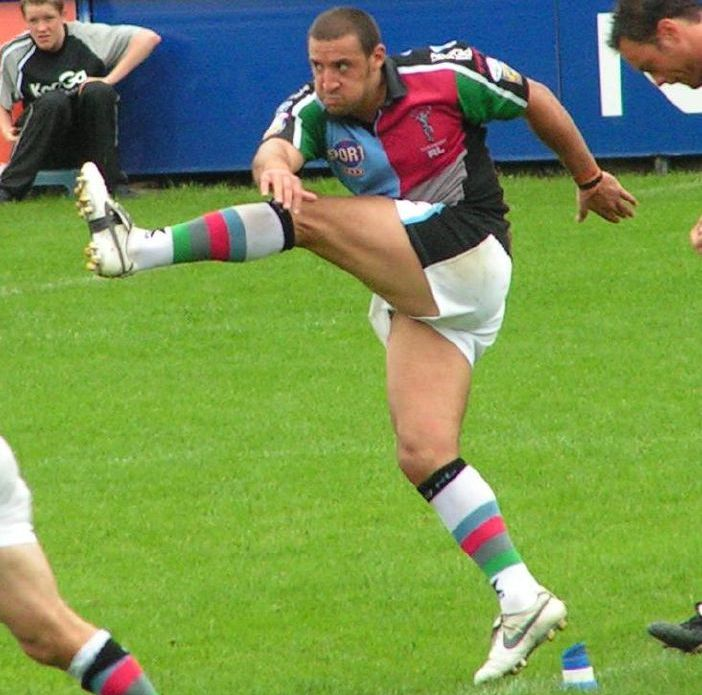
Sykes playing for Harlequins Rugby League

=== London ===
With the promise of more regular first XIII rugby Sykes moved south to join the London Broncos in a permanent deal in August 2002.

Sykes soon settled back to life in the capital and representative honours were gained with an appearance for England "A" against New Zealand in October, followed by a place on the successful "A" team tour to Fiji and Tonga.

Sykes has further earned England caps against Russia and Wales in 2003 and France and New Zealand in 2005.

Sykes originally came to the club as full-back, but the arrival of club captain Mark McLinden has seen Sykes operate largely in the centres in Super League X and XI.

Sykes successfully converted during 2005 to the centre position where his powerful running and strong tackling are seen to their best advantage.

Super League XI saw Sykes ruled out for much of the season after damaging his kidneys in February. However he made a comeback towards the end of the season after initially being ruled out for the entire campaign

2005 was a record breaking year for Sykes. On 27 February against the Wakefield Trinity Wildcats, Sykes kicked 12 goals from 12 attempts to break a 17-year-old London club record.

Further records for most goals and most points followed at the season's end and in recognition of these achievements Sykes was voted Supporters' Player-of-the-Year for 2005. Harlequins centre Sykes has confirmed his expected move to Bradford for next season on a two-year contract.

Sykes, who made his Great Britain début earlier this season, left Bradford on loan in 2002 to find first-team rugby.

Quins coach Brian McDermott also paid tribute to Sykes' contribution at the Stoop.

=== Return to Bradford ===
Sykes signed for Bradford Bulls in September 2007 as a replacement for the departing Ben Harris.

On rejoining Bradford he said: "A lot's changed at Bradford since the first time around and I think there's only Paul Deacon and Jamie Langley still there. "But I'm ready for a fresh challenge and I'm hoping to move back north to win some silverware. Bradford are always challenging and I'm glad I'm going to be a part of that. "Also, my girlfriend has just given birth to our first child as well and we want to be closer to our family." Boss Steve McNamara reckons he has picked up a rare talent, and added "I'm absolutely delighted to have secured an outstanding English centre and thank the board for making the deal possible".

=== Wakefield ===
In the 2012 season Sykes was loaned out to fellow West Yorkshire club the Wakefield Trinity Wildcats after only playing 2 games for Bradford Bulls. Here he managed to help lead the Wakefield Trinity Wildcats into the play-offs ironically at the expense of Bradford Bulls. Sykes soon signed a permanent one-year deal with the Wakefield Trinity Wildcats for the 2013 season.

== Career statistics ==
Appearances and goals by club, season and competition
Club	Season	League					
Club	Season	Division	Apps	Trys	Goals	Drop Goals	Points
Bradford Bulls	1999	Super League	4	0	0	0	0
Bradford Bulls	2000	Super League	2	2	0	0	4
Bradford Bulls	2001	Super League	0	0	0	0	0
Bradford Bulls	Total		6	2	0	0	4
London Broncos (loan)	2001	Super League	9	1	23	1	56
Bradford Bulls	2002	Super League	3	0	3	0	6
London Broncos	2002	Super League	16	2	14	0	36
London Broncos	2003	Super League	17	6	1	0	26
London Broncos	2004	Super League	27	6	68	0	160
London Broncos	2005	Super League	32	14	133	2	324
London Broncos	2006	Super League	8	2	9	0	26
London Broncos	2007	Super League	28	18	39	1	151
London Broncos	Total		0	0	0	3	0
Bradford Bulls	2008	Super League	17	6	1	0	26
Bradford Bulls	2009	Super League	26	10	17	0	74
Bradford Bulls	2010	Super League	27	4	48	2	114
Bradford Bulls	2011	Super League	16	6	2	0	28
Bradford Bulls	2012	Super League	2	0	2	0	4
Bradford Bulls	Total		0	0	0	3	0
Wakefield Trinity	2012	Super League	22	3	73	3	161
Wakefield Trinity	2013	Super League	16	5	37	2	96
Wakefield Trinity	2014	Super League	24	4	28	1	73
Wakefield Trinity	Total		62	12	138	6	0
Featherstone Rovers	2015	Championship	33	18	104	0	280
Dewsbury Rams	2016	Championship	2	1	5	1	15
Dewsbury Rams	2017	Championship	3	2	9	0	26
Dewsbury Rams	2018	Championship	19	1	49	0	102
Dewsbury Rams	2019	Championship	23	5	47	3	117
Dewsbury Rams	2020	Championship	5	1	21	0	46
Dewsbury Rams	2021	Championship	19	1	42	2	90
Dewsbury Rams	2022	Championship	23	3	32	1	77
Dewsbury Rams	2023	League One	19	3	89	1	217
Dewsbury Rams	2024	Championship	16	1	9	0	22
Dewsbury Rams	2025	League One	11	1	15	0	34
Dewsbury Rams	2026	Championship	0	0	0	0	0
Dewsbury Rams	Total		0	0	0	0	0
Career Total			514	140	980	21	2,766

== International career ==
=== Great Britain ===
In June 2007 Sykes was called up to the Great Britain squad and will play in the centres in the Test match against France.

Sykes is joined in the Great Britain Test side by Harlequins RL teammate Chris Melling.

Sykes made his Great Britain début in the 42–14 victory over the French on 22 June 2007, scoring one try.

=== England ===
In September 2008 he was named in the England training squad for the 2008 Rugby League World Cup, and in October 2008 he was named in the final 24-man England squad.

He has been named in the England team to face Wales at the Keepmoat Stadium, Doncaster, prior to England's departure for the 2008 Rugby League World Cup.

Sykes has also represented the England in their warm up match against Wales before the 2009 Four Nations.
