= Matt Gafa =

Malta international rugby league footballer

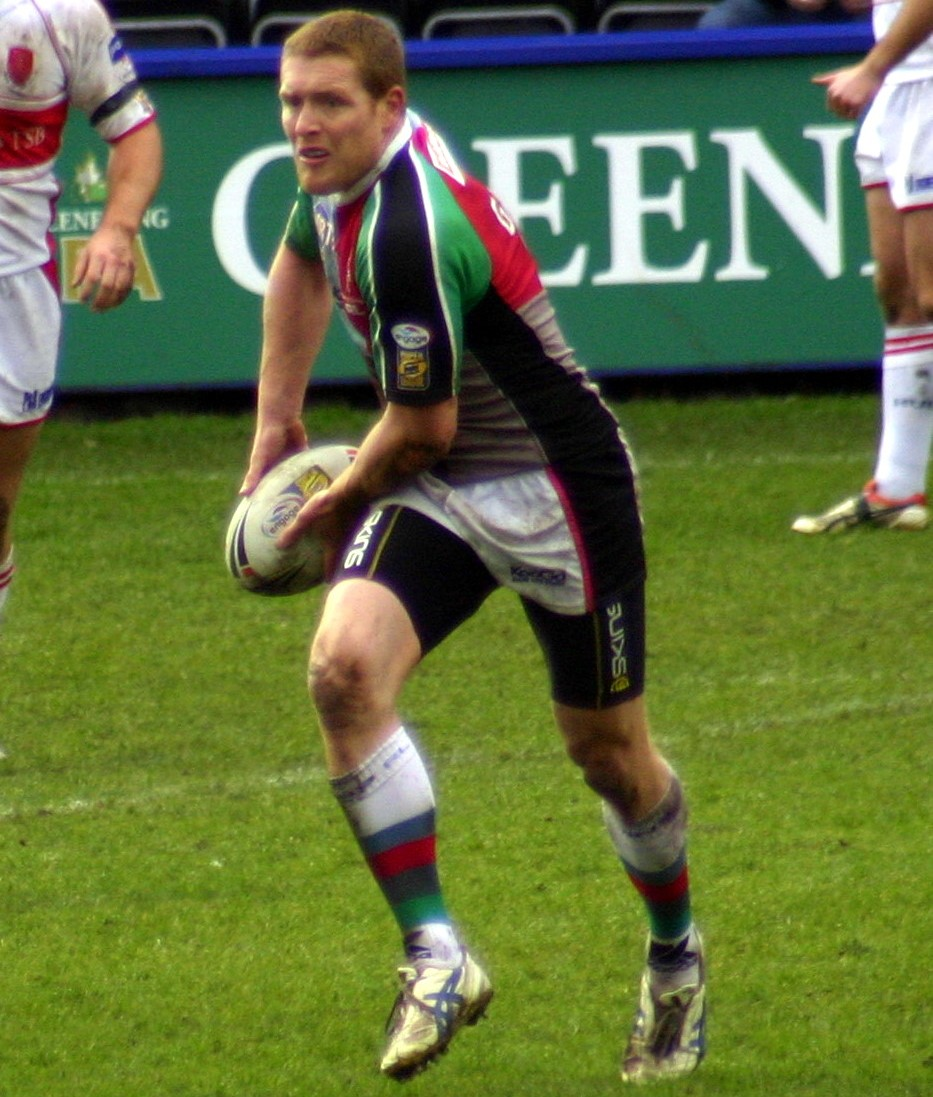

Personal information
- Full name: Matthew Gafa
- Born: 31 August 1978 (age 48) Canberra, ACT, Australia
- Height: 6 ft 1 in (1.85 m)
- Weight: 15 st 4 lb (97 kg)

Playing information
- Position: Second-row, Centre, Wing
Club
Years	Team	Pld	T	G	FG	P
1997	Canberra Raiders	2	0	0	0	0
2004–05	Canberra Raiders	40	31	51	0	154
2006–09	Harlequins RL	78	24	12	0	120
	Total	120	55	63	0	274
Representative
Years	Team	Pld	T	G	FG	P
2005	Malta	1	1	0	0	4
- Source: As of 25 January 2019

Matt Gafa (born 31 August 1978) is an Australian former professional rugby league footballer who played in the 1990s and 2000s. He was a Malta international. He last played for Harlequins RL in the Super League. He had previously played for the Canberra Raiders in the NRL and has also played in Elite One Championship in France. Gafa's usual position was as a centre. He could also operate on the wing. In 2007, he has moved into the forwards in the second-row, and has also operated at loose forward. In the past he had also operated in the stand-off role.

== Playing career ==
Gafa made his first grade debut for Canberra in Round 1 1997 against Cronulla-Sutherland. In 2003, Gafa was a member of the reserve grade premiership winning team scoring an individual 348 points.

After a six-year absence from first grade, Gafa returned to the team in 2004 and became a regular starter before departing for England at the end of 2005. Gafa joined Harlequins in 2006 who were previously known as the London Broncos.

At one point in his career at Harlequins, he was the leading try-scorer in 2008's Super League XIII running in 4-tries in the opening two rounds of the engage Super League.

Gafa left Harlequins at the end of 2009 to return to Australia. Gafa then became captain of the Belconnen United Scholars in the Canberra Raiders Cup.

== Post playing ==
Gafa currently works for the Australian Bureau of Statistics in Belconnen.

Gafa is currently coaching North Canberra Bears in the George Tooke Shield
