= Jon Grayshon =

English rugby league footballer (born 1983)

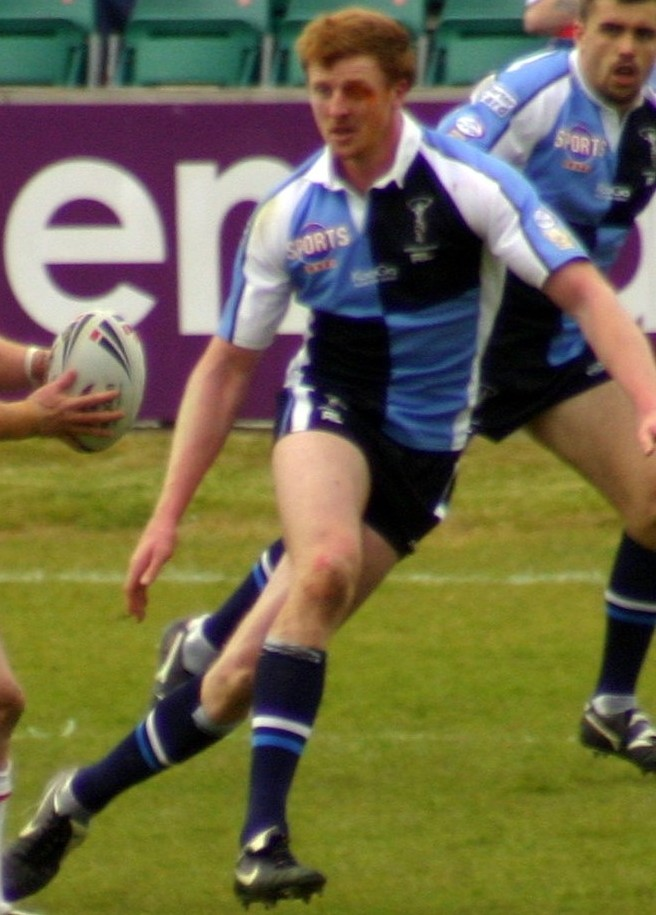

Personal information
- Full name: Jonathan Grayshon
- Born: 10 May 1983 (age 42) Bradford, Yorkshire, England

Playing information
- Height: 6 ft 6 in (1.98 m)
- Weight: 16 st 8 lb (105 kg)
- Position: Prop, Second-row
Club
Years	Team	Pld	T	G	FG	P
2001–06	Huddersfield Giants	51	6	0	0	20
2002(loan)	→ Gateshead Thunder	3	0	0	0	0
2006(loan)	→ Batley Bulldogs	6	0	0	0	0
2007–09	Harlequins RL	46	5	0	0	20
2009(loan)	→ Widnes Vikings	9	3	0	0	12
2010–12	Featherstone Rovers	75	27	0	0	108
2014	Whitehaven	5	0	0	0	0
	Total	195	41	0	0	160

Jonathan Grayshon (born 10 May 1983) is an English former professional rugby league footballer. Grayshon's usual position was prop, he also operated in the second-row.

== Background ==
Grayshon was born in Bradford, West Yorkshire, England.

== Career ==
Grayshon played for Featherstone Rovers where he was signed from the Harlequins RL in the Super League. Grayshon has formerly played for the Huddersfield Giants and the Batley Bulldogs. In 2009 he spent most of the year on loan at the Widnes Vikings.
