= Chris Melling (rugby league) =

English rugby league player

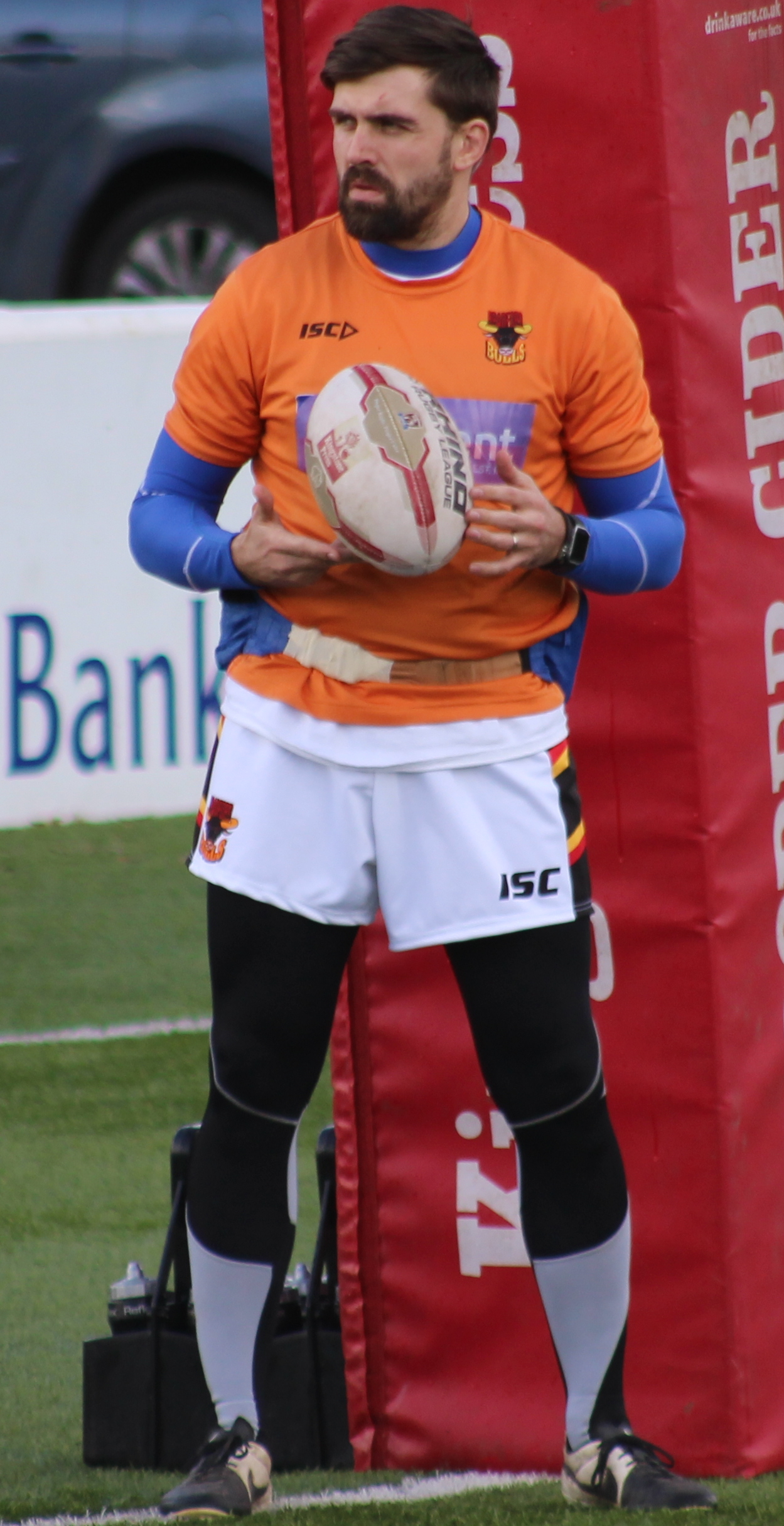

Personal information
- Full name: Christopher Melling
- Born: 21 September 1984 (age 41) Ashton-in-Makerfield, Wigan, England

Playing information
- Height: 5 ft 11 in (1.80 m)
- Weight: 14 st 7 lb (92 kg)
- Position: Wing, Fullback, Second-row, Loose forward
Club
Years	Team	Pld	T	G	FG	P
2004–06	Wigan Warriors	13	3	17	0	46
2007–13	Harlequins RL	163	43	10	0	192
	Total	176	46	27	0	238
Representative
Years	Team	Pld	T	G	FG	P
2007	Great Britain	1	0	0	0	0

Christopher Melling (born 21 September 1984) is an English former professional rugby league player who played in the 2000s and 2010s. He played in the Super League for the Wigan Warriors and Harlequins Rugby League (later renamed the London Broncos), as a fullback, wing, second-row or loose forward, and for Great Britain.

== Early life ==
Melling was born in Ashton-in-Makerfield, Greater Manchester, England. He was a pupil at Byrchall High School.

Melling was a youth level international for England, touring Australia and New Zealand with England Under 16s in 2001 and also representing England's U18 Academy.

== Playing career ==
=== Wigan Warriors ===
Melling is a former Wigan Senior Academy captain who made several appearances for the Wigan first team.

In 2004's Super League IX it had seemed that Melling's career was in doubt following a serious knee injury suffered playing for Wigan against Leeds at Headingley. Melling had been seen as a future star before having his season ended by a cruciate ligament injury.

Upon his return to first team action in 2005's Super League X Chris made a further 10 first-grade appearances for the Wigan Warriors before picking up another knee injury requiring further surgery.

Melling returned to full fitness in 2006, but found first team opportunities limited, due to the emergence of Chris Ashton at the club. Chris Melling moved to hooker in Wigan's academy, impressing enough to be voted as the Under-21s Academy 'Player of the Year' for 2006.

He left Wigan to pursue regular first team rugby league.

=== Harlequins RL ===
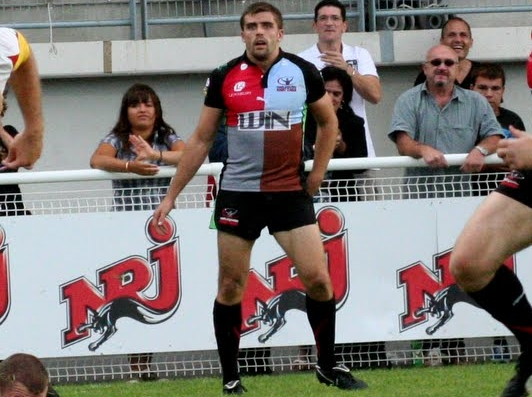
Melling in action for Harlequins RL

Melling was initially signed as a back-up hooker to Chad Randall, however the Great Britain international made the fullback position his own. He has been compared to Wade McKinnon with the youngster being defensively solid and dependable, with an eye for a gap bringing the ball out in attack. His move to Harlequins was to have seen the youngster undergo a positional change with a move to hooker. He had been previously employed throughout the backline, with most of his first team appearances coming as an outside back.

Melling impressed in 2007, starting games at fullback and throughout the backline and scoring four tries. In May 2007 Melling agreed to a new two-year deal with Harlequins Rugby League, midway through his first season at the Twickenham Stoop. This will keep Melling in the capital until 2009. He is seen as the emerging star at the Harlequins, with Harlequins RL investing in young British talent.

=== Representative football ===
In June 2007 Melling was called up to the Great Britain squad, and was fullback in the Test match against France. He was joined in the Great Britain Test side by Harlequins teammate Paul Sykes. Melling made his Great Britain début in the 42-14 victory over the French on 22 June 2007, despite carrying an injury.

== Physiotherapy career ==
Melling became a qualified physiotherapist after studying at the University of Central Lancashire in Preston, graduating in June 2006. He hoped to set up his own physiotherapy practise in the future.

After retiring as a player in 2013, Melling joined Warrington Wolves as a rehab specialist and academy physiotherapist, and later worked as a physio at Oldham and Halifax. Melling became head physio at Leigh Leopards in December 2022.
