= Ade Adebisi =

English rugby league footballer

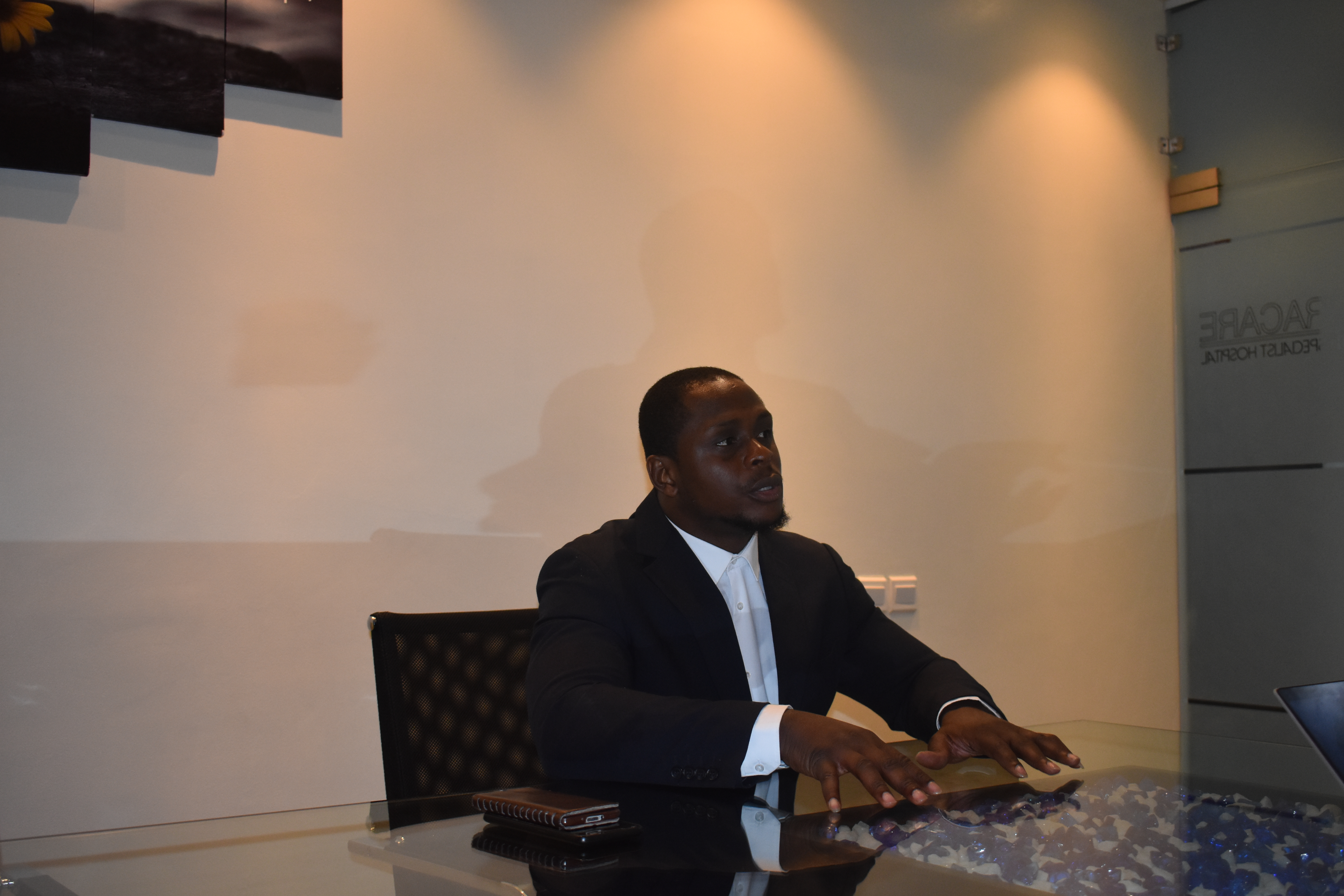
- Ade Adebisi at his signing as the Brand Ambassador for Biomedomics Sickle Scan

Personal information
- Born: 1 July 1986 (age 39)

Playing information
- Height: 5 ft 8 in (1.73 m)
- Weight: 15.4 st; 216 lb (98 kg)
- Position: Fullback, Wing
Club
Years	Team	Pld	T	G	FG	P
2004–06	London Broncos	1	0	0	0	0
2005(loan)	→ Hull F.C.	0	0	0	0	0
2006(loan)	→ London Skolars	1	0	0	0	0
2007	Doncaster Lakers	9	5	0	0	20
2007	Featherstone Rovers	11	5	0	0	20
2008–09	Whitehaven	49	32	0	0	128
2010–13	London Skolars	67	52	0	0	208
	Total	138	94	0	0	376

Ade Adebisi (born 1 July 1986) is a British rugby league footballer. He played at representative level for (BARLA) Young Lions against France, and was selected for the 2011 Championship 1 All Stars team. At club level he played for the London Skolars (two spells), in 2004 for the London Broncos, Hull F.C. (loan, Academy), Doncaster Lakers, Featherstone Rovers and Whitehaven in National League One (reserve grade), as a fullback or wing.

Adebisi suffers from the genetic blood disorder sickle-cell disease and is the only known rugby player ever to play professionally with the condition. He is an ambassador for the Sickle Cell Society and the founder of the Ade Adebisi Sickle Cell Foundation. Adebisi also leads the Nigeria rugby league revolution as general manager/vice chairman. The former professional spent two years between 2017 and 2019 working to get the African nation involved with the 13-a-side code for no money. Under his leadership, Nigeria was chosen to host the Middle East Africa rugby league championship in October 2019.

== Playing career ==
=== London Broncos ===
In 2002, Adebisi, a promising schoolboy athlete and footballer joined the London Broncos development programme before signing up for their junior academy team the following season. In 2004, as well as representing the BARLA Young Lions against France, he also made his debut for London in Super League. Limited opportunities at senior level led to a spell on loan to Hull F.C. where he played in their successful 2005 academy side.

=== Doncaster Lakers & Featherstone ===
His association with the London club ended in 2007, when he signed initially for Doncaster before moving to Featherstone for the last 11 games of the season.

His first year at the Recre was a great success and he finished the season as the club's top try scorer. Together with teammate Craig Calvert, Haven had two of the most potent wingmen in the Championship.

=== Whitehaven RLFC ===
In 2008, he joined Whitehaven R.L.F.C. from the 2007 National League Two winning side, Featherstone Rovers. While at Whitehaven R.L.F.C., he was their top try scorer in 2008, with 22 tries in 30 games.

=== London Skolars ===
In 2010, Adebisi returned to London Skolars, following his release by Whitehaven, scoring 51 tries in 66 games through to 2013.

== Retirement ==
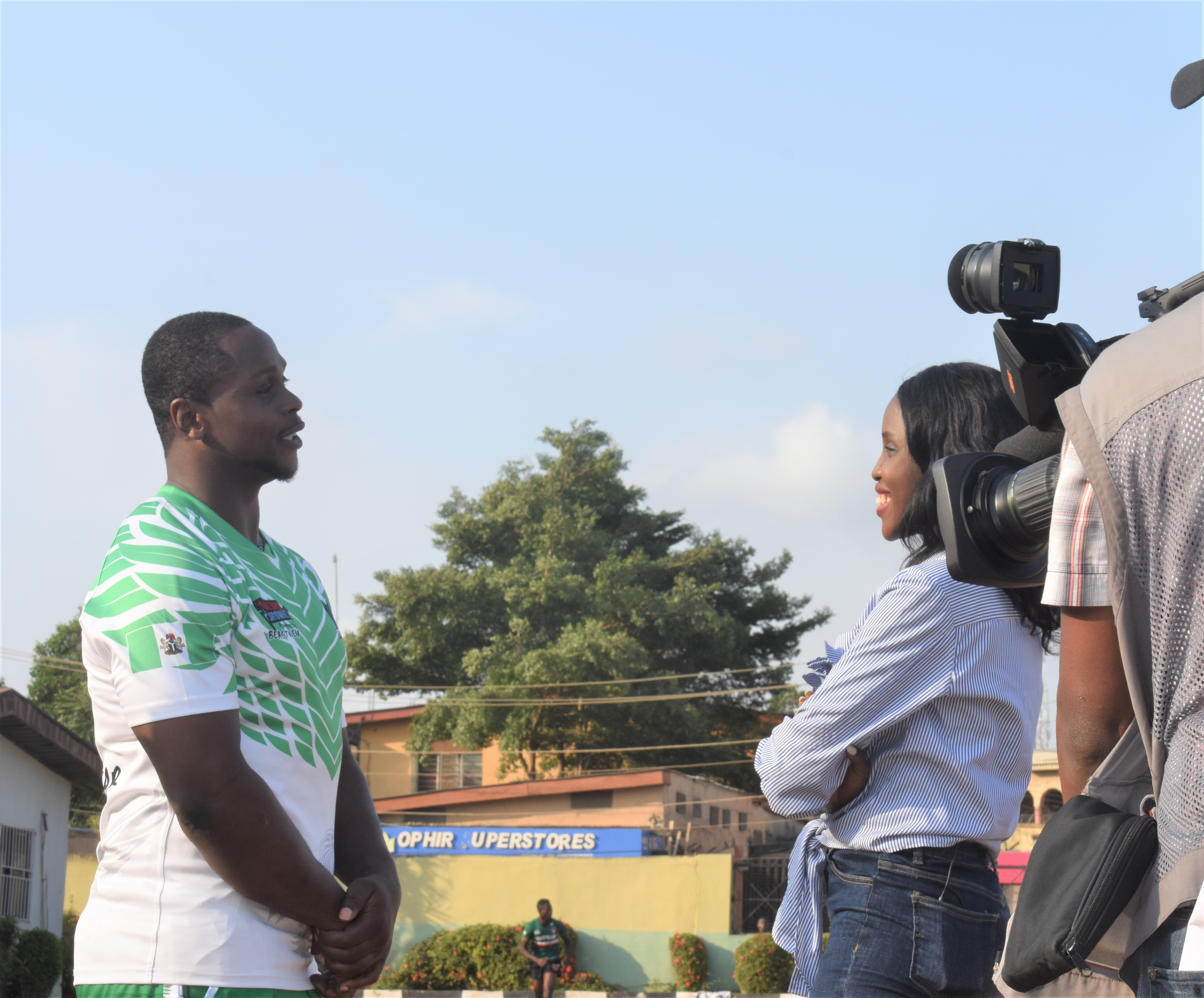
BBC Sports Africa interviewing Ade Adebisi at the Nigeria Rugby League training camp in Lagos, Nigeria.

In 2014, following a struggle with injuries and sickle cell disease, Adebisi retired from playing professional rugby league.
