= Anthony Stewart (rugby league) =

Ireland international rugby league footballer

Tony Stewart
Personal information
- Full name: Anthony Stewart
- Born: 5 March 1979 (age 47) Wigan, Greater Manchester, England

Playing information
- Position: Fullback, Wing, Centre, Second-row
Club
Years	Team	Pld	T	G	FG	P
1996–04	St Helens	140	56	0	0	224
2001(loan)	→ Bradford Bulls	2	0	0	0	0
2004(loan)	→ Salford City Reds	27	7	0	0	28
2005–06	Salford City Reds	29	10	0	0	40
2006	Harlequins RL	4	0	0	0	0
2007–09	Leigh Centurions	61	8	0	0	32
2010–11	Swinton Lions	18	3	0	0	12
2012–13	Rochdale Hornets	16	1	0	0	4
	Total	297	85	0	0	340
Representative
Years	Team	Pld	T	G	FG	P
2003–07	Ireland	9	2	0	0	8
	Lancashire	0	0	0	0	0

Anthony Stewart (born 5 March 1979) is an English former rugby league footballer who played in the 1990s, 2000s and 2010s.

He played at representative level for Ireland and Lancashire, and at club level in the Super League for St. Helens, with whom he won a World Club Challenge, Challenge Cup and a Super League Grand Final, the Bradford Bulls (loan), the Salford City Reds (two spells, including the first on loan) and Harlequins RL, and the Leigh Centurions, the Swinton Lions and the Rochdale Hornets, as a fullback, wing, centre or second-row.

== Background ==
Stewart was born in Wigan, Greater Manchester, England.

== Playing career ==
He began playing at Hindley Juniors before joining Saints. Having won the 1999 Championship, St. Helens contested in the 2000 World Club Challenge against National Rugby League Premiers the Melbourne Storm, with Stewart playing from the interchange bench in the loss. As Super League V champions, St. Helens played against 2000 NRL Premiers, the Brisbane Broncos in the 2001 World Club Challenge. Stewart played from the interchange bench in Saints' victory. Stewart played for St. Helens on the wing in their 2002 Super League Grand Final victory against the Bradford Bulls. Having won Super League VI, St Helens contested the 2003 World Club Challenge against 2002 NRL Premiership-winners, the Sydney Roosters. Stewart played on the wing in Saints' 38–0 loss.

Anthony signed for Salford City Reds on loan from St. Helens in 2004. He signed permanently in 2005. He was named in the Ireland training squad for the 2008 Rugby League World Cup.
