= David Tootill =

English rugby league footballer

Personal information
- Born: 22 May 1986 (age 38); Oldham, Greater Manchester, England
- Height: 6 ft 3 in (1.91 m)
- Weight: 17 st 0 lb (108 kg)

Playing information
- Position: Prop, Second-row
Club
Years	Team	Pld	T	G	FG	P
2003–06	Leeds Rhinos
2005(loan)	→ Oldham
2007–08	Harlequins RL
2009–12	Batley Bulldogs
	Total	0	0	0	0	0
- As of 1 July 2021

David Tootill (born 22 May 1986) is an English former professional rugby league footballer. Tootill played for Harlequins RL in the Super League. He was previously with the Leeds Rhinos and has also played for Batley Bulldogs, York City Knights as well as his home town Oldham RLFC.

David Tootill's usual position is prop. He can also operate in the second-row.

== Background ==
David Tootill was born in Oldham, Greater Manchester, England.
