= Joe Walsh (rugby league, born 1988) =

English rugby league footballer

Personal information
- Full name: Joseph Walsh
- Born: 25 December 1988 (age 37) Saddleworth, Oldham, England
- Height: 6 ft 3 in (1.91 m)
- Weight: 16 st (100 kg)

Playing information
- Position: Loose forward
Club
Years	Team	Pld	T	G	FG	P
2007–08	Harlequins RL	6	0	0	0	0
2008(loan)	→ Halifax	7	0	0	0	0
2009	Huddersfield Giants	3	1	0	0	4
2009(loan)	→ Sheffield Eagles	4	2	0	0	8
	Total	20	3	0	0	12

Joe Walsh (born 25 December 1988) is a former professional rugby league footballer who played for Harlequins RL and Huddersfield Giants.

He was born in Saddleworth, Oldham, Greater Manchester, and is a former Rishworth school pupil.

== Playing career ==
Walsh was part of the Leeds Rhinos academy team before joining Bradford Bulls in 2006 on a one-year deal where he also played at academy level.

In 2007, Walsh signed a two-year deal with Harlequins whose coach, Brian McDermott, stated that "Joe Walsh has been a godsend to us" following their win over Warrington Wolves. While at Harlequins he spent time on loan at Halifax. He signing for Huddersfield for the 2009 season and joined Sheffield Eagles on loan part way through the season.

== Post-playing career ==
On 22 October 2026 it was reported that he had been appointed as General Manager of Recruitment & Rugby at St Helens
