= Jon Wells =

English rugby league footballer, administrator and TV broadcaster

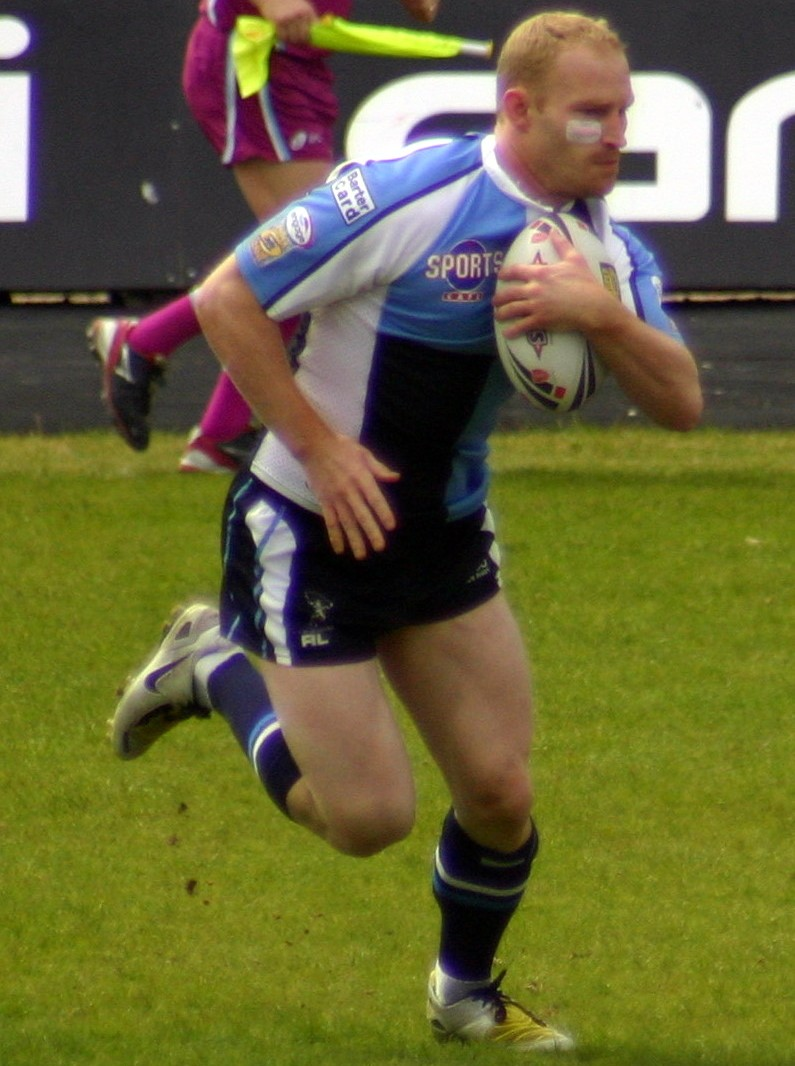

Personal information
- Full name: Jon Matthew Wells
- Born: 23 September 1978 (age 47) Wakefield, West Yorkshire, England

Playing information
- Height: 5 ft 11 in (1.80 m)
- Weight: 14 st 5 lb (91 kg)
- Position: Fullback, Wing, Centre
Club
Years	Team	Pld	T	G	FG	P
1997–02	Castleford Tigers	139	51	0	0	204
2003	Wakefield Trinity Wildcats	26	1	0	0	4
2004–09	London Broncos	120	31	0	0	124
	Total	285	83	0	0	332

Jon Matthew Wells (born 23 September 1978) is an English rugby league pundit who was the Director of Rugby at the Castleford Tigers in the Super League in 2019 and a former professional rugby league footballer. He debuted at Super League level in 1997, making his final appearance in 2009.

He played at club level for Castleford Tigers (Heritage No. 734), Wakefield Trinity Wildcats and London Broncos/Harlequins RL, as a fullback, wing, or centre.

He started as an occasional Sky Sports rugby league pundit in 2011 but became a regular.

He ran a hotel with his wife for a few years and then went onto start a gym in the Harrogate area which is still the case as of 2019.

On 12 March 2018 he became director of rugby at Castleford Tigers.

== Background ==
Jon Wells was born in Wakefield, West Yorkshire, England and played for Sharlston Rovers as an amateur Rugby League player. He is currently living with his 2 daughters (Amelie and Ada) and wife (Lyndsay).

== Career ==
He was signed by the Castleford Tigers and played in the first team from 1998 onwards. According to Rugby League project, Wells scored 6 tries in 22 games for the Castleford Tigers in 1998; 10 tries in 31 games in 1999; 14 tries in 29 games in the year 2000 (a career best); 9 tries in 30 games in 2001 and 13 tries in 26 games in 2002. He also obtained a Law and Master's degree in Criminal Justice Studies during his time at the Tigers.

Jon signed for Castleford's main rivals, Wakefield Trinity Wildcats, on a two-year contract for the 2003 and 2004 seasons. He played at fullback, wing, and centre. Wakefield remained 11th out of 12, losing 20 out of 28 games in the 2003 Super League VIII scoring one try in 25 games. Wells would go on to sign for London Broncos, as a part of 11 changes to the London team.

Jon had a good strike rate in his early years at the London Broncos, scoring 8 tries for the London Broncos in 22 games in 2004, and 13 tries in 27 games in all competitions in 2005.

Wells played just six games in 2006 for Harlequins RL, scoring a single try. In 2007, he played 27 games scoring 7 tries. In 2008, Wells scored 2 tries in 19 appearances, the last try of his career was against Hull KR, on 5 April 2008. 2009 saw Wells play 19 games, without scoring. Wells' last game for the club was at Hull F.C. on 21 August 2009 where he appears to have sustained a career ending neck injury. Whilst Rob Purdham was the only player in London's history to be awarded a testimonial for ten years of service to the club, Wells was awarded a testimonial for 2010, the first player to have been awarded a testimonial by the Rugby Football League whilst representing a club in London.

By the end of 2009, Wells had made over 250 Super League appearances including 120 for London Broncos/Harlequins RL, 24 appearances for Wakefield Trinity Wildcats and 139 appearances for Castleford Tigers. He signed a new contract but at the start of the 2010 Super League XV, he informed Harlequins RL that he was retiring.

=== Post Playing Career ===
Wells began appearing on Sky Sports 2010 onwards as a guest, to cover the London Broncos. By 2012, his appearances on Sky were still occasional but becoming a little more frequent. Wells later became a regular on Sky in a secondary role, focusing on brief summaries, statistics, and post match interviews.

On 12 March 2018 he became director of rugby at the Castleford Tigers.
