= Tyrone Smith (rugby) =

Professional rugby league & union footballer (born 1983)

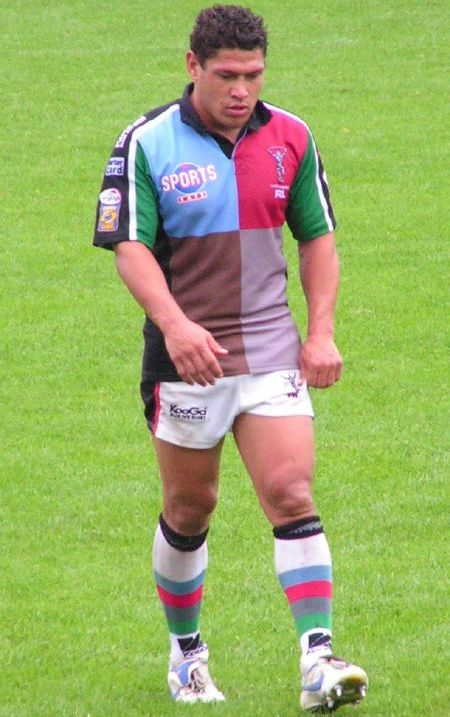
- Born: Tyrone Smith; 12 May 1983 (age 43) Manly, New South Wales, Australia
- Height: 5 ft 10 in (1.78 m)
- Weight: 94 kg (14 st 11 lb)
- School: St Edmund's College; Cromer High School
- Notable relative: George Smith

Rugby union career
- Position: Centre or Wing
Senior career
| Years | Team | Apps | (Points) |
| 2011–12 | Honda Heat | 4 | (0) |
| 2013–15 | RC Narbonne | | |
Super Rugby
| Years | Team | Apps | (Points) |
| 2008–11 | Brumbies | 47 | (30) |
International career
| Years | Team | Apps | (Points) |
| 2002 | Australian Schoolboys | | |
- Rugby league career

Playing information
- Position: Left centre
Club
| Years | Team | Pld | T | G | FG | P |
|---|---|---|---|---|---|---|
| 2002–04 | Sydney Roosters | 76 |
| 2004–07 | London Broncos/Harlequins RL | 96 |
| | Total | 172 | 0 | 0 | 0 | 0 |
Representative
| Years | Team | Pld | T | G | FG | P |
| 2005–07 | Tonga | 4 |

Tyrone Smith (born 12 May 1983) is a former professional rugby union and rugby league footballer. He finished his career with French Rugby Pro D2 team RC Narbonne. Smith previously played Super Rugby with the Brumbies and Super League with the London Broncos/Harlequins RL. His usual position was centre (RU) or wing (RL).

== Early life ==
Smith was born in Manly, New South Wales. He played his early rugby in the union code, touring the UK in 2002 with the Australian Schoolboys team. He is the younger brother of Australian Wallaby flanker George Smith.

== Career ==
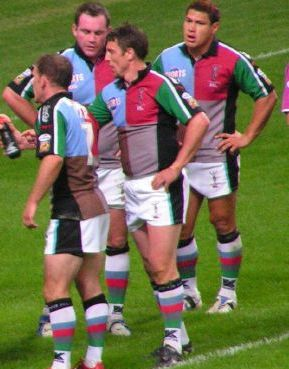
Tyrone Smith (right) in action for Harlequins RL

=== Rugby League ===
In 2002, Smith switched to rugby league to play with the Sydney Roosters and was part of the winning junior side in the Jersey Flegg premiership. Graduating to NSWRL Premier League, he scored a try in the Roosters' 30–8 win over St George-Illawarra in the 2004 Premier League grand final. Smith signed with the London Broncos (later renamed Harlequins RL) in 2004 to play in the Super League. In 2005 he made his international début for Tonga against Samoa in Sydney and scored two tries in their 34–20 win.

=== Rugby Union ===
In 2008, Smith agreed a two-year deal with the Brumbies to switch to rugby union and join his older brother George Smith playing in the Super Rugby competition. He earned 47 caps for the Brumbies between 2008 and 2011.

Later in 2011, he moved to Japan to play for the Honda Heat in the 2011–12 Top League season. In June 2013, he signed a two-year deal with French Pro D2 team RC Narbonne.

=== Post-rugby career ===
After retiring from professional rugby, he moved to work as a rugby coach at Sydney Grammar school.

He later became Director of Rugby at Sydney Grammar school.
