= Zebastian Lucky Luisi =

Former New Zealand Māori & Niue international rugby league footballer

Zebastian Luisi
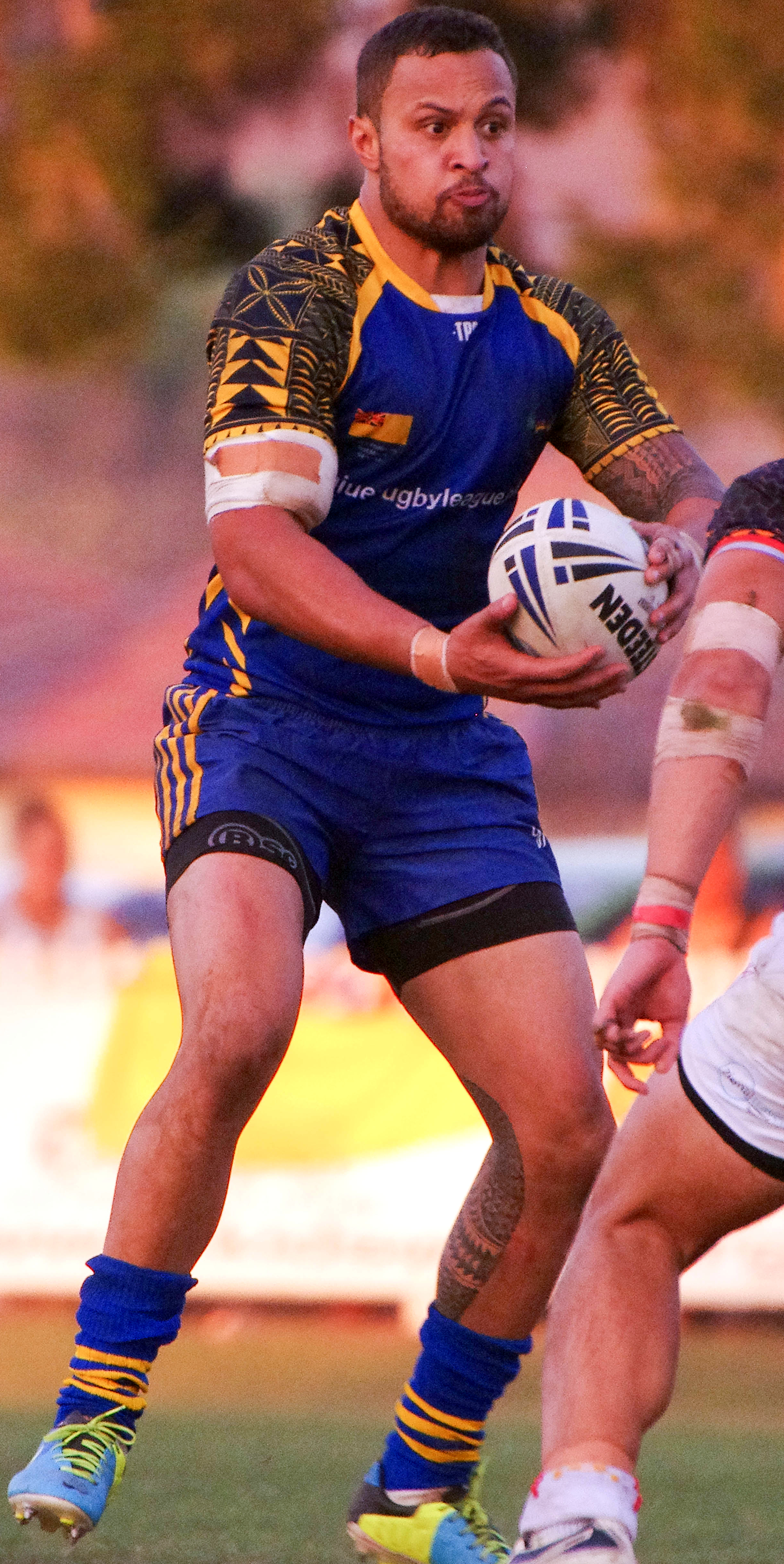

Personal information
- Full name: Zebastian Lucky Luisi
- Born: 22 December 1984 (age 41) Auckland, New Zealand
- Height: 6 ft 0 in (1.83 m)
- Weight: 14 st 4 lb (91 kg)

Playing information
- Position: Fullback, Wing, Centre, Loose forward
Club
Years	Team	Pld	T	G	FG	P
2004–07	London Broncos/Harlequins RL	50	11	0	0	44
2008	Doncaster	30	9	0	0	36
2009–11	Barrow Raiders	74	15	0	0	60
2012	Otahuhu Leopards
2013–14	Howick Hornets
	Total	154	35	0	0	140
Representative
Years	Team	Pld	T	G	FG	P
2013–14	New Zealand Māori	2	0	0	0	0
2018	Niue	4	1	0	0	4

Coaching information
Club
Years	Team	Gms	W	D	L	W%
2014	Howick Hornets
- Source: As of 8 February 2021

Zebastian "Lucky" Luisi (born 22 December 1984) is a New Zealand rugby league footballer who has competed in the Auckland Rugby League competition, his most recent club being the Howick Hornets. He has also represented the Otahuhu Leopards. Luisi has also represent Niue in international rugby league.

== Background ==
Luisi was born in Auckland, New Zealand.

== Early years ==
Luisi is a Junior Kiwi international. Luisi is of Māori and Niuean descent and previously played for the Eastern Tornadoes in the Bartercard Cup, the top level rugby league competition in New Zealand.

== England ==
Zebastian Lucky Luisi joined London Broncos on a 2-year contract at the end of 2004's Super League IX after putting together some impressive performances on trial with the club during that season. The big full-back was selected to play for the Harlequins rugby union side for the Middlesex Sevens at Twickenham Stadium.

Lucky Luisi played for Doncaster in National League Two having signed in February 2008 from Harlequins RL. At the start of the 2009 Season he joined championship club Barrow Raiders

Luisi's position of choice is as a fullback. He can also operate on the wing and in the centres where he is to feature for Doncaster.

== Return to New Zealand ==
He returned home in 2012, joining the Otahuhu Leopards in the Auckland Rugby League competition. In 2013 and 2014 he is the player-coach of the Howick Hornets. He played for the Counties Manukau Stingrays in the 2013 National Competition.

== Niue ==
At the 2018 Emerging Nations World Championship, Luisi represented Niue, playing at Five-eighth in all four of the tournament matches. Also, on 27 October, he played in a 36–32 loss against Italy. In this match, he scored his first try for the Niuean national team.
