= Daniel Heckenberg =

Scotland international rugby league footballer

Dan Heckenberg

Personal information
- Full name: Daniel Heckenberg
- Born: 27 October 1979 (age 46) Camden, New South Wales, Australia

Playing information
- Height: 185 cm (6 ft 1 in)
- Weight: 109 kg (17 st 2 lb)
- Position: Prop
Club
Years	Team	Pld	T	G	FG	P
2000–01	St. George Illawarra	4	0	0	0	0
2002–03	Parramatta Eels	40	1	0	0	4
2004–05	Manly Sea Eagles	34	2	0	0	8
2006–09	Harlequins RL	67	4	0	0	16
2010–11	Widnes Vikings	17	0	0	0	0
	Total	162	7	0	0	28
Representative
Years	Team	Pld	T	G	FG	P
2000	Scotland	3	0	0	0	0

Daniel Heckenberg (born 27 October 1979) is a former Scotland international rugby league footballer. He played as a prop at club level in the NRL for the St. George Illawarra Dragons, Parramatta Eels and the Manly-Warringah Sea Eagles, in the Super League for Harlequins RL, and in the RFL Championship for the Widnes Vikings.

== Early career ==
Heckenberg was born in Camden, New South Wales, Australia.

Heckenberg began his rugby career at St Gregory's College, Campbelltown, a school renowned for producing young rugby league footballers. He first played internationally as part of the Australian Schoolboys team in a match against the BARLA Young Lions. After his graduation he played for a short while as an amateur for the Eagle Vale-St Andrews junior side.

== NRL ==
He began his professional career at National Rugby League side St. George Illawarra Dragons, progressing through the youth team and earning his first grade début in 2000. In the same year, Heckenberg made his first appearance as a Scotland international, participating in the 2000 Rugby League World Cup. He moved clubs in 2002, joining the Parramatta Eels, before changing team again in 2004, this time playing with the Manly-Warringah Sea Eagles. He provided much defensive support for the Sea Eagles and was held in high esteem by his peers at the club.

== Harlequins Rugby League ==
His performances led to a transfer to Super League side Harlequins, and he soon became an important part of the team's defensive game. Heckenberg confirmed his first grade place in the beginning of his second year at the club but suffered a severe shoulder injury in a match against Bradford Bulls in May, bringing his 2007 Super League XII campaign to an end. Harlequins coach Brian McDermott described Heckenberg as a hard worker and an integral part of the team. Heckenberg underwent surgery in June to correct the problem but when he returned from injury for 2008's Super League XIII he again suffered a setback. He dislocated his shoulder in training in March 2008, resulting in a six-week absence from the team.

== Representative ==
Heckenberg was named in the Scotland training squad for the 2008 Rugby League World Cup but was forced to withdraw from the competition due to injury.

== Personal ==
In his spare time, Heckenberg enjoys listening to the music of the Foo Fighters and U2, and also helps to train youth rugby league players at Elmbridge Rugby League Club.

== Statistics ==
League	Team	Season	Appearances	Tries
National Rugby League	St. George Illawarra Dragons	2000–01	4	0
National Rugby League	Parramatta Eels	2002–03	40	1
National Rugby League	Manly-Warringah Sea Eagles	2004–05	34	2
Super League	Harlequins RL	2006	25	1
Super League	Harlequins RL	2007	14	2

- All information taken from Harlequins RL 2008 Club Guide.
