= Chad Randall =

Australian rugby league footballer

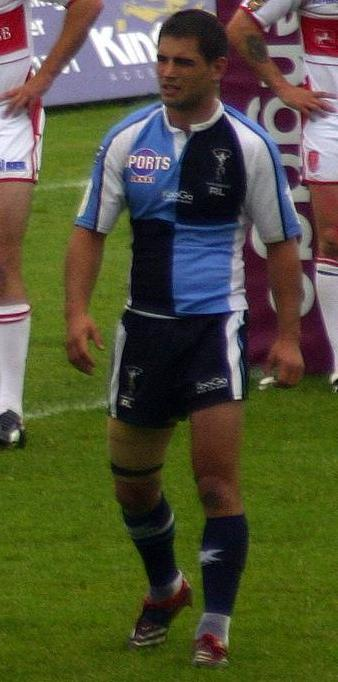

Personal information
- Born: 30 December 1980 (age 45) Manly, New South Wales, Australia

Playing information
- Height: 1.78 m (5 ft 10 in)
- Weight: 86 kg (13 st 8 lb)
- Position: Hooker, Halfback
Club
Years	Team	Pld	T	G	FG	P
2002	Northern Eagles	13	0	0	0	0
2003–05	Manly Sea Eagles	53	7	0	0	28
2006–13	London Broncos	197	48	0	1	193
	Total	263	55	0	1	221
- Father: Terry Randall

Chad Randall (born 30 December 1980) is an Australian former professional rugby league footballer who played for the Manly Sea Eagles in the National Rugby League (NRL) and the London Broncos in the Super League. Randall's usual position was at hooker. Currently, he works as an assistant coach at the Canterbury-Bankstown Bulldogs, and was formerly an assistant coach for Manly.

== Background ==
Randall was born in Manly, New South Wales, Australia.

His father, Terry Randall, was part of the successful Sea Eagles teams of the 1970s.

Randall's junior club was the North Curl Curl Knights.

Chad attended St Paul's Catholic College, Manly

== NRL career ==
- First Grade Debut: Northern Eagles v Canberra Raiders at Northpower Stadium at Grahame Park, 20 April 2002 (Rd 6) coming off the bench.

In 2002, Randall played for the now defunct Northern Eagles joint-venture club, before playing for the Manly-Warringah Sea Eagles from 2003 to 2005 following Manly's re-entry into the NRL as a single-entity club. He was considered to be one of Manly's best players in 2003, however injury and a general lack of form plagued the next two seasons for him.

Randall's good looks saw him model on the catwalk during Australian Fashion Week in 2004, and following this appearance he was asked to model for Adidas sportswear. Randall was also a finalist in the Sexiest Man in League competition in 2004 (placed third) and 2005.

== Harlequins RL ==
Randall moved to Harlequins for 2006's Super League XI. Randall was noted for his effort in attack, whilst his defence was also highly regarded. He played 197 games, just 5 short of the club all-time record. The club reverted to one of its former names, London Broncos, for the 2012 season.
