= Mark Tookey =

Australian rugby league footballer

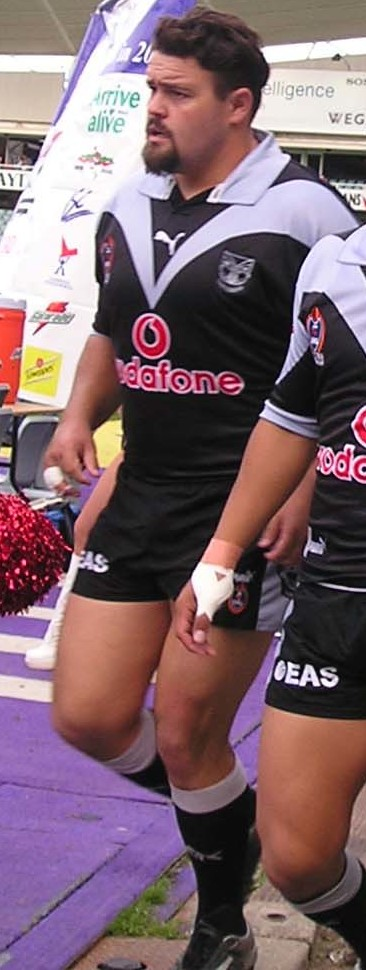

Personal information
- Full name: Mark Tookey
- Born: 9 March 1977 (age 49) Paddington, New South Wales, Australia

Playing information
- Height: 183 cm (6 ft 0 in)
- Weight: 115 kg (18 st 2 lb)
- Position: Prop
Club
Years	Team	Pld	T	G	FG	P
1996–97	South Qld Crushers	18	3	0	0	12
1998–99	Parramatta Eels	40	4	0	0	16
2000–04	New Zealand Warriors	67	9	0	0	36
2004	Castleford Tigers	10	1	0	0	4
2005–06	London Broncos	56	6	0	0	24
	Total	191	23	0	0	92

Mark Tookey (born 9 March 1977) is an Australian former professional rugby league footballer who played in the 1990 and 2000s. He played as a prop in Australia for the South Queensland Crushers and the Parramatta Eels as well as the New Zealand Warriors. Tookey then played in the Super League for the Castleford Tigers and the Harlequins RL.

== Background ==
Tookey was born in Paddington, New South Wales and raised in Brisbane, Queensland, playing his junior rugby league for Logan Brothers and Springwood Tigers. In 1994, he represented the Queensland under-17 side.

== Playing career ==
Tookey commenced his premiership playing career with the South Queensland Crushers debuting during the 1996 ARL season. That season he represented the Queensland under-19 side. He then moved to the Parramatta Eels and later joined the Auckland Warriors. He played for the Warriors at prop forward in their 2002 NRL Grand Final loss to the Sydney Roosters.

In 2004 Tookey started playing in the Super League for English club the Castleford Tigers, later moving to the London Broncos/Harlequins RL.

== Post-playing ==
Following to his retirement as a player, Tookey was in 2009 the assistant coach of the Tongan side. He later worked as a Development Officer for the Canberra Raiders with their associated club Souths Logan Magpies.

Tookey ran as an independent candidate in Division 5 in the 2016 Logan City Council election, which was being held on 19 March.

In November 2018, Tookey played for Parramatta in the Legends of League tournament held in Gosford. The side was captained by Nathan Hindmarsh and made it to the preliminary final before being defeated by The Barbarians.

In November 2019, Tookey played for Parramatta in the Legends of League Tournament, held in Broadmeadow, NSW. The side was captained by Nathan Hindmarsh, they made it to the grand final, and beating the Canterbury Team in the Final.

== Sources ==
- Alan Whiticker & Glen Hudson (2007). The Encyclopedia of Rugby League Players. Wetherill Park, New South Wales: Gary Allen Pty Ltd. p. 553. ISBN 978-1-877082-93-1.
- Mitchell Dale. "Legend Q&A". Rugby League Week (18 June 2008). Sydney, NSW: PBLMedia: 30–31.
