= Nick Bradley-Qalilawa =

Fiji international rugby league footballer

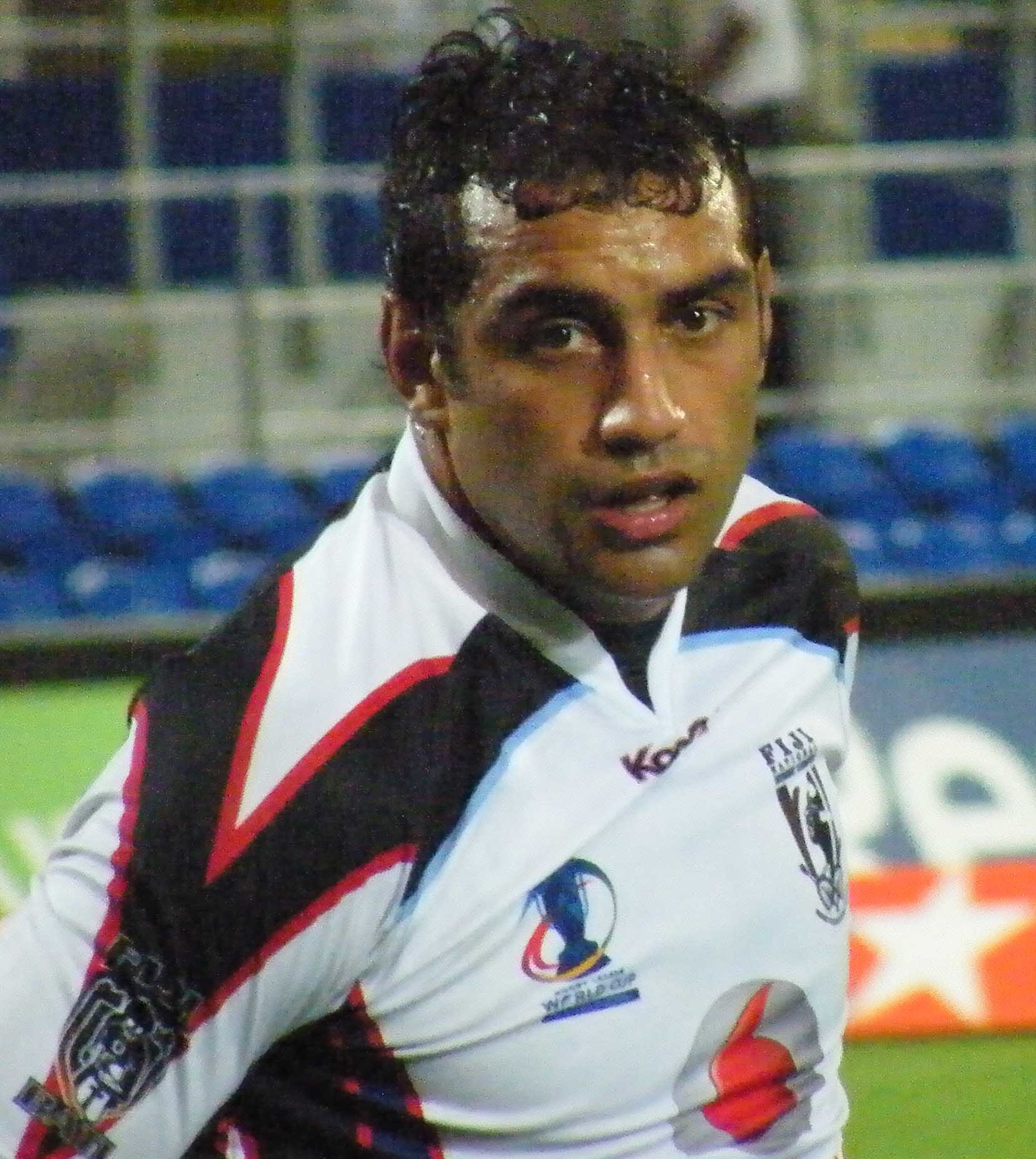

Personal information
- Full name: Nick Bradley-Qalilawa
- Born: 28 March 1980 (age 46) Darlinghurst, New South Wales, Australia
- Height: 185 cm (6 ft 1 in)
- Weight: 94 kg (14 st 11 lb)

Playing information
- Position: Wing, Centre
Club
Years	Team	Pld	T	G	FG	P
2001–03	Wests Tigers	27	5	0	0	20
2004	Manly Sea Eagles	11	4	0	0	16
2005–06	Harlequins RL	58	28	0	0	112
2007–08	Manly Sea Eagles	4	5	0	0	20
	Total	100	42	0	0	168
Representative
Years	Team	Pld	T	G	FG	P
2008	Fiji	4	0	0	0	0
- Source: As of 22 January 2019

Nick Bradley-Qalilawa (born 28 March 1980) is a former Fiji international rugby league footballer who played in the 2000s.

== Background ==
Bradley-Qalilawa was born in Darlinghurst, New South Wales, Australia.

== Career in Australia ==
Bradley-Qalilawa is a North Sydney Bears junior playing every grade in the district except first-grade and won a Jersey Flegg Grand final in 1998. He played at the Wests Tigers, making his first grade début in 2001, Manly and London Broncos/Harlequins RL. He primarily played on the wing.

== Career in the Super League ==
Bradley-Qalilawa joined the London Broncos in 2005 and played for the club under its new guise as Harlequins RL in 2006. He left the club at the conclusion of 2006's Super League XI, scoring 26 tries in 55 games.

== Representative career ==
He was named in the Fiji squad for the 2008 Rugby League World Cup.
