= Rob Purdham =

Former England international rugby league footballer

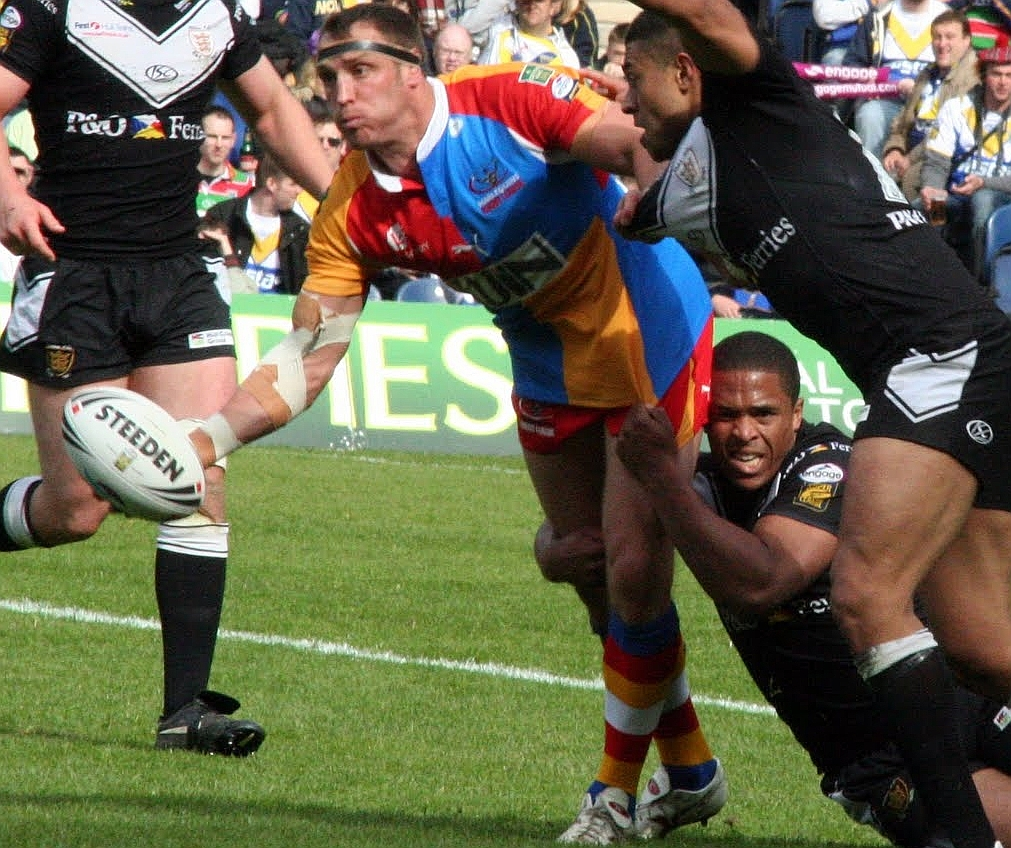

Personal information
- Full name: Robert Purdham
- Born: 14 April 1980 (age 46) Egremont, Cumbria, England

Playing information
- Height: 1.85 m (6 ft 1 in)
- Weight: 95 kg (14 st 13 lb)
- Position: Loose forward, Second-row, Stand-off, Centre
Club
Years	Team	Pld	T	G	FG	P
1999–01	Whitehaven	55	18	13	3	101
2002–11	London Broncos / Harlequins RL	197	36	167	2	480
	Total	252	54	180	5	581
Representative
Years	Team	Pld	T	G	FG	P
2001	England U21	1	2	0	0	8
2003	England A	2	1	0	0	4
2003–10	Cumbria	2	0	1	0	2
2006–08	England	7	3	15	0	42

Robert Purdham (born 14 April 1980) is an English former professional rugby league footballer who played in the 1990s, 2000s and 2010s. An England international representative loose forward, he previously played for Whitehaven and London Broncos/Harlequins. Purdham also operated as a centre, stand-off or second-row. Purdham is a former captain of the England national team.

== Background ==
Rob Purdham was born in Egremont, Cumbria.

== Early career ==
Purdham started his career in his hometown with amateur side Egremont Rangers. In February 1998, he played and scored a try in the club's 18–0 fourth round Challenge Cup victory over the professionals of Workington Town. In 1999, he signed professional terms with Whitehaven in the Northern Ford Premiership. During his three years at the club, he went on to make 55 appearances.

== London Broncos ==
=== London Broncos (2002–2005) ===
Purdham joined London Broncos in December 2001, following his selection for the England under-21 tour of South Africa, and an impressive start to the season with Whitehaven. He made his début for the Broncos in a Challenge Cup game against Batley Bulldogs.

=== Harlequins RL (2006–2011) ===
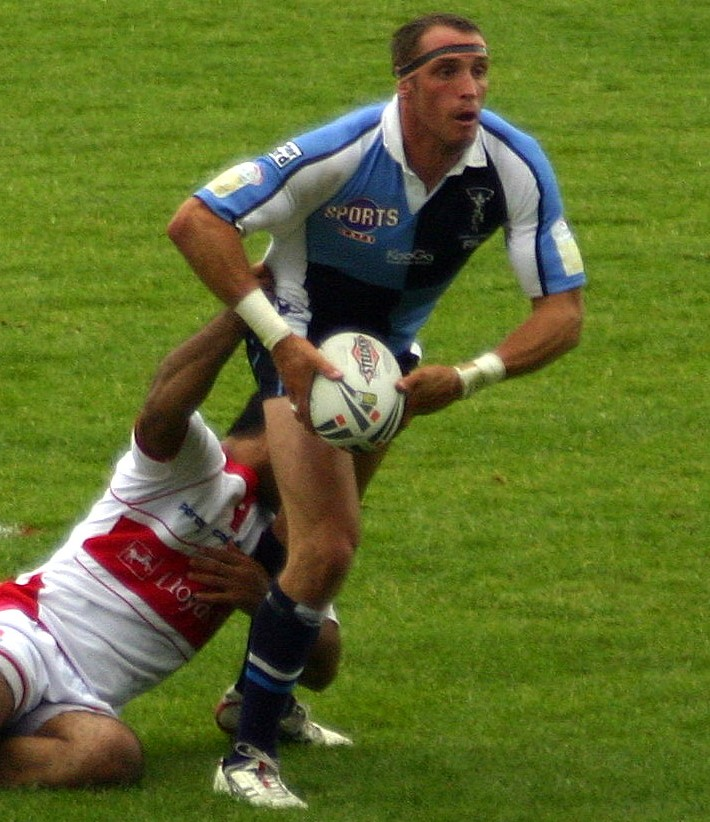
Purdham in action for Harlequins

On 20 May 2006, Rob set a new Quins club record by scoring 34 points (2 tries, 13 goals) in Harlequins RL's 82–8 victory over Barrow Raiders in the Challenge Cup. The 13 goals in itself surpassed the previous record of 12 held by Paul Sykes.

In 2007, he was appointed the club's captain, replacing Mark McLinden.

In July 2011, Purdham announced he would be leaving Harlequins at the end of the season, and returning home to the family farm in Cumbria, England. He made a total of 197 appearances for the club, five games less than the club's record appearance holder Steele Retchless. Although he initially showed interest in re-signing with former club Whitehaven, he announced his retirement from playing altogether following medical advice. He played a total of 264 games during his professional career (252 appearances at club level, and 12 representative appearances).

== Representative career ==
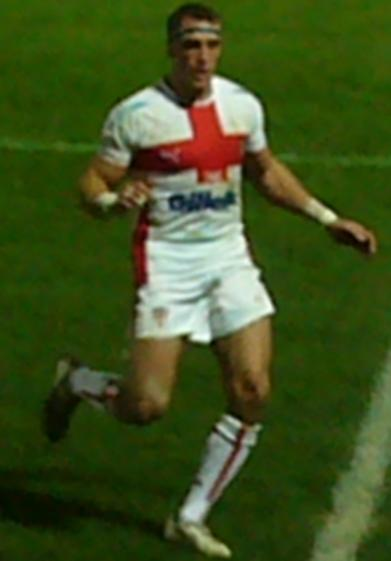
Purdham in action for England in 2008

Purdham made his representative début in 2001 for England's under-21 team during their tour of South Africa, scoring two tries in a 112–6 victory over the hosts.

In 2003, Purdham represented England A, appearing twice during the 2003 European Nations Cup.

England coach Paul Cullen named Purdham as captain in his 20-man training squad for the 2006 Federation Shield tournament. Purdham lifted the trophy with a 32–14 victory over Tonga.

In September 2008, he was named in the England training squad for the 2008 Rugby League World Cup, and in October 2008 he was named in the final 24-man England squad, making two appearances in the tournament.

Purdham also played twice for Cumbria.

== Career highlights ==
- Junior Clubs: Egremont Rangers, Whitehaven
- First Grade Stats: 246 career games scoring 46 tries
- International Début: 22 October 2006 against France

== Personal life ==
Purdham's brother, Garry, who was also a professional rugby league footballer for Workington Town, died on 2 June 2010, at Gosforth, Cumbria, during a shooting spree in which a further 12 people were killed. Purdham was given compassionate leave by his club to travel back to Cumbria and has subsequently said that the positive response of the rugby league community has convinced him he was right not to give up his playing career following the tragedy.
