= Mark McLinden =

Australian rugby league footballer

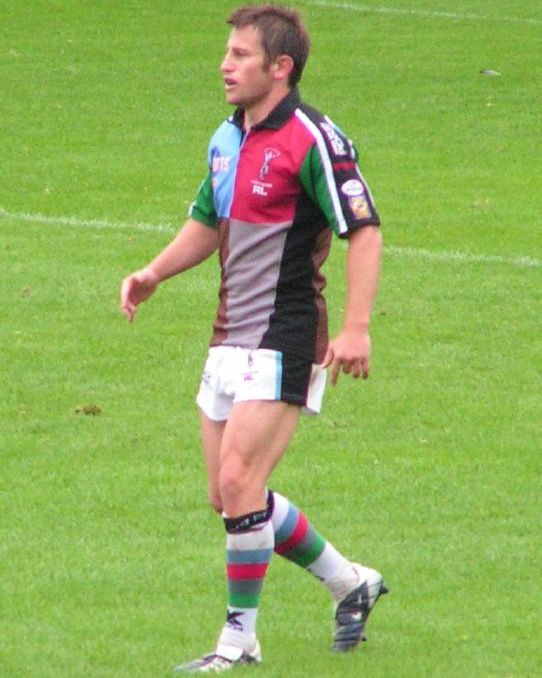
- McLinden playing for Harlequins RL in 2007

Personal information
- Born: 8 July 1979 (age 47) Canberra, ACT, Australia

Playing information
- Height: 176 cm (5 ft 9 1/2 in)
- Weight: 86 kg (13 st 8 lb)

Rugby league
- Position: Fullback, Five-eighth, Halfback
Club
Years	Team	Pld	T	G	FG	P
1998–04	Canberra Raiders	165	65	0	1	261
2005–08	London Broncos/Harlequins RL	79	31	0	1	125
	Total	244	96	0	2	386
Representative
Years	Team	Pld	T	G	FG	P
2001	NSW Country	1	0	0	0	0

Rugby union
Club
Years	Team	Pld	T	G	FG	P
2009	Queensland Reds	3	1	0	0	5

Mark McLinden (born 8 July 1979) is an Australian former professional rugby footballer of the 1990s and 2000s. He played rugby league in the NRL for Australian club, the Canberra Raiders and in the Super League for English club the London Broncos/Harlequins RL, which he also captained. A Country New South Wales representative backline player, McLinden finished his career in 2009 with a few rugby union games for the Queensland Reds in Super Rugby.

== Early years ==
McLinden was born in Canberra, ACT, and played his early rugby at West Belconnen Warriors in the Canberra District Junior Rugby League. While attending Hawker College, McLinden played for the Australian Schoolboys team in 1996 and 1997.

== Rugby league career ==
In 1998, McLinden signed to play in the NRL for his local team Canberra Raiders. Following an impressive début season, Mark was named NRL Rookie of the Year, and later won the Raiders' player of the year award.

He also received representative honours with selection for the Australian Junior Kangaroos squad to play tests against the Junior Kiwis. In 2001 McLinden was selected to play in the City vs Country Origin for Country. During his seven seasons at the Canberra Raiders, McLinden made 165 appearances, featuring in five play-off series.

=== Super League ===
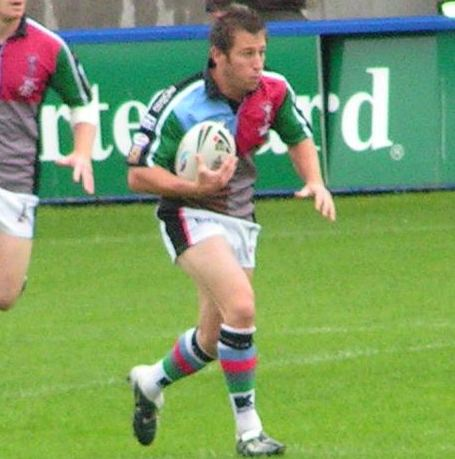
McLinden in action for Harlequins RL

McLinden signed for the London Broncos in November 2004 and was appointed team captain following on from Jim Dymock. During 2005's Super League X, his first in the Super League, Mark showed his versatility by appearing at fullback, halfback or hooker.

In 2006's Super League XI, with his club now operating as the Harlequins RL, Mark was the club's leading Super League try scorer with 14 tries from 17 appearances. His season was, however, disrupted by a persistent back injury which required an operation in late 2006.

McLinden had played much of his career at halfback, and with the arrival of Great Britain international fullback Chris Melling at the Harlequins RL he played several games of 2007's Super League XII in the halves.

The 2007 Super League XII saw McLinden return from injury. However, he was replaced as captain by England international Rob Purdham.

McLinden signed a three-year extension to his contract to keep him at Harlequins until the end of the 2009 season. However, in 2008 he suffered from a long debilitating illness which caused him to lose a lot of weight. As a result, he barely featured in Super League and he was released at the end of the year.

Before his switch to rugby union he was asked to play for the Ireland national rugby league team at the 2008 World Cup, but declined in favour of Super 14 pre-season training.

== Rugby union career ==
McLinden played rugby union for the Queensland Reds in 2009. He scored his first Super 14 try in his side's 22–3 win over South Africa's Cheetahs at Suncorp Stadium. Just before the 2009/10 Super 14 season he retired from the game due to medical advice.

== Later life ==
McLinden is a co-director of Animalates, an exercise program for children aged 4–11, combining Pilates, yoga, aerobics and dance with an animal characters theme.

McLinden was arrested for a pitch invasion at the 2022 NRL Grand Final. He entered the field wearing a shirt with "end coal, gas & oil" on the front and "for our kids" on the back, in protest against Government inaction to prevent climate change. McLinden was fined $5000 and banned from future NRL games.

McLinden threatened to disrupt the 2023 NRL Grand Final, via a tip-off to a Journalist from The Sydney Morning Herald. Rather than run the story, the journalist tipped off the NSW Police and the NRL. Security and officials carried pictures of McLinden ahead of the match, in the hope of identifying him before he attempted his pitch invasion.

== Video Links ==
- BBC Video
