= Lee Hopkins =

Australian rugby league footballer

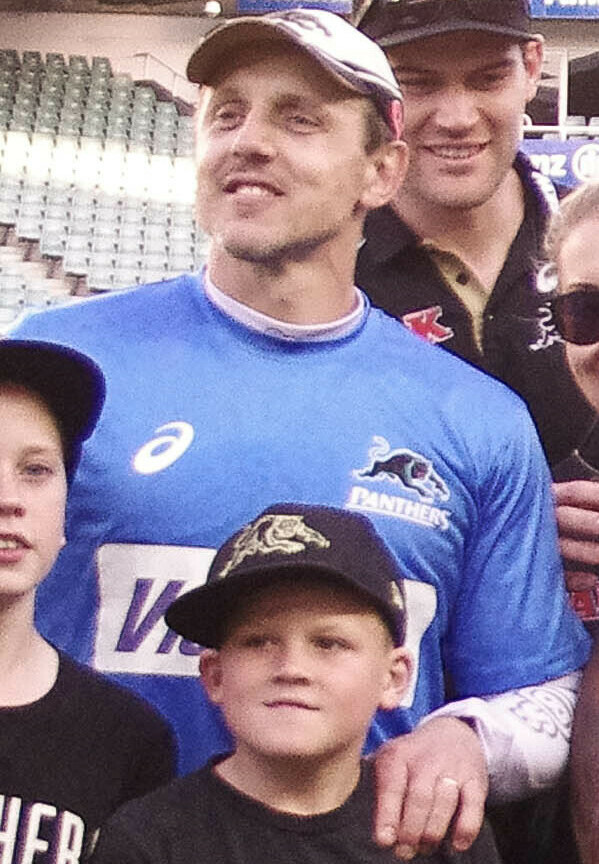

Personal information
- Full name: Lee Hopkins
- Born: 17 February 1978 (age 48) Sydney, New South Wales, Australia

Playing information
- Height: 182 cm (6 ft 0 in)
- Weight: 99 kg (15 st 8 lb)
- Position: Second-row
Club
Years	Team	Pld	T	G	FG	P
1997–02	Penrith Panthers	70	5	0	0	20
2003–04	Parramatta Eels	37	10	0	0	40
2005–07	Harlequins RL	85	20	0	0	80
	Total	192	35	0	0	140

Lee Hopkins (born 17 February 1978) is an Australian former rugby league footballer who played in the 1990s and 2000s for the Parramatta Eels and the Penrith Panthers in the NRL competition and for the London Broncos/Harlequins RL in the Super League, as a second-row.

== Playing career ==
Hopkins made his first grade debut for Penrith in Round 10 1997 against the Western Reds at the WACA which ended in a 35–20 loss. Hopkins was part of the Penrith side which finished 5th in the 2000 season but lost to Parramatta in the semi-finals.

The following season, Hopkins made 16 appearances as Penrith endured a horrid season on the field and finished last. At the end of 2002, Hopkins was released by Penrith to join Parramatta. Hopkins played 2 seasons with Parramatta, both of which saw the club miss the finals. Hopkins was then released by Parramatta and he signed with Harlequins in England.

Having played a stint for the London Broncos/Harlequins RL in the Super League, Hopkins returned to Australia at the end of the 2007 season. In 2008, he played for the Windsor Wolves in the Jim Beam Cup competition before retiring due to a persistent knee injury.

== Post playing ==
From the 2019 season, Hopkins is the Strength and Conditioning Coach for the Penrith Panthers in the National Rugby League
