= Karl Temata =

Cook Islands international rugby league footballer

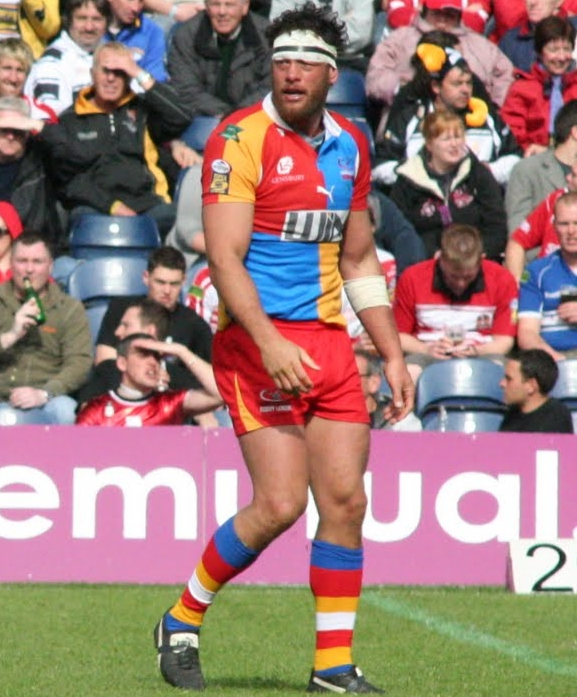

Personal information
- Born: 12 July 1978 (age 47) Whangārei, New Zealand

Playing information
- Height: 1.91 m (6 ft 3 in)
- Weight: 108 kg (17 st 0 lb)
- Position: Prop, Second-row, Loose forward
Club
Years	Team	Pld	T	G	FG	P
2002–05	New Zealand Warriors	52	2	0	0	8
2005–12	London Broncos	137	11	0	0	44
2014	Oxford	4	0	0	0	0
	Total	193	13	0	0	52
Representative
Years	Team	Pld	T	G	FG	P
2000	Cook Islands	3	1	0	0	4

Karl Temata (born 12 July 1978) is a former Cook Islands international rugby league footballer who played as a prop, second-row, loose forward or winger in the 2000s and 2010s. He played at club level for the Hibiscus Coast Raiders, New Zealand Warriors, London Broncos/Harlequins and Oxford.

== Background ==
Temata was born in Whangārei, New Zealand. He is of Māori and Cook Islands descent.

== Playing career ==
Temata played for the Harlequins RL in the Super League. He previously played for the New Zealand Warriors and the Hibiscus Coast Raiders. He was named the Harlequins RL player of the year in 2009.

In 2011 Temata signed a one-year extension with Harlequins RL for the 2012 season.

== Representative career ==
Temata played for the Cook Islands in the 2000 Rugby League World Cup, and scored a try in the Cook Islands' 38-6 defeat by Wales in Wrexham. In September 2011 he was named in the Cook Islands squad to play New Zealand in Rarotonga on 6 October 2011 ahead of New Zealand's participation in the 2011 Four Nations in England, and Wales.
