= Filimone Lolohea =

New Zealand rugby league footballer

Fili Lolohea
Personal information
- Full name: Filimone Lolohea
- Born: 31 January 1979 (age 47) Auckland, New Zealand
- Height: 6 ft 1 in (1.85 m)
- Weight: 110 kg (17 st 5 lb)

Playing information
- Position: Prop, Loose forward
Club
Years	Team	Pld	T	G	FG	P
2002–04	South Sydney	9	0	0	0	0
2005–06	London Broncos/Harlequins RL	32	0	0	0	0
	Total	41	0	0	0	0
Representative
Years	Team	Pld	T	G	FG	P
1999–00	Tonga	1	0	0	0	0

Filimone "Fili" Lolohea (born 31 January 1979) is a New Zealand former professional rugby league footballer who played in the 1990s and 2000s. He played at representative level for Tonga, and at club level for the South Sydney Rabbitohs and London Broncos/Harlequins RL, as prop or loose forward.

At the conclusion of his professional football career he trained for Christian ministry, and is now a church leader in Redfern, Sydney.

== Background ==
Lolohea was born in Auckland, New Zealand, he has Tongan ancestors, and eligible to play for Tonga due to the grandparent rule.

== Playing career ==
Lolohea was an Ellerslie Eagles junior, and joined the new Auckland Warriors franchise in 1995. In 1997 he was part of the Warriors Under-19s team that lost the grand final.

In 1999 Lolohea played for Tonga in the one off test match against New Zealand. He was subsequently picked for the 2000 Rugby League World Cup.

In 2002 Lolohea joined the South Sydney Rabbitohs when they returned to the National Rugby League. He played in nine first grade games for the club over three seasons.

Lolohea then moved to England, joining the London Broncos/Harlequins RL. He played in 32 matches over two seasons for the London side before retiring.
