= Joe Mbu (rugby league) =

DR Congolese RL coach and former professional rugby league footballer

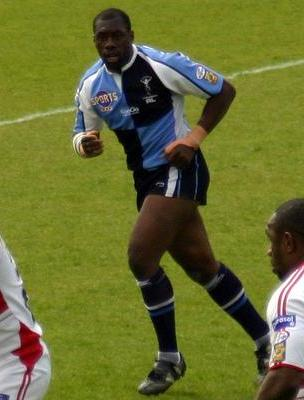

Personal information
- Full name: Joseph Mbu
- Born: 11 November 1983 (age 42) Zaire
- Height: 5 ft 10 in (1.78 m)
- Weight: 15 st 0 lb (95 kg)

Playing information
- Position: Second-row
Club
Years	Team	Pld	T	G	FG	P
2003–06	London Broncos	68	8	0	0	32
2007	Doncaster	10	2	0	0	8
2007–09	Harlequins RL	41	2	0	0	8
2009–11	London Skolars	10	1	0	0	4
	Total	129	13	0	0	52

Coaching information
Club
Years	Team	Gms	W	D	L	W%
2010–15	London Skolars	0	0	0	0
2021–2023	London Skolars	0	0	0	0
2026–	North Herts Crusaders	2	1	0	1	50
	Total	2	1	0	1	50
Representative
Years	Team	Gms	W	D	L	W%
2019–	Nigeria	2	2	0	0	100
- Source: As of 21 September 2026

Joe Mbu (born 11 November 1983), also known by the nickname of "Big Joe", is a Congolese former professional rugby league footballer and coach. Mbu played for the London Broncos/Harlequins RL in the Super League. He is the current head coach of the North Herts Crusaders.

== Playing career ==
Joe Mbu's usual position was second-row. He also operated on the loose forward, and prop positions.

He was a product of the London Broncos academy setup, having played his early rugby league at the London Skolars. As a teenager Mbu also played rugby union as well, playing for an extremely successful Finchley RFC youth team in North London.

In 2002, Joe was loaned out by the London Broncos to the Huddersfield Giants to gain experience in their Senior Academy side. He started the 2003 season with a similar loan-out at Leeds Rhinos before being recalled to the London Broncos to make his Super League début.

Mbu played in the Super League for the London Broncos/Harlequins RL from 2003 to 2006. He became a crowd favourite amongst the London Broncos fans for his solid and dependable performances for the club.

Mbu joined the National League One team Doncaster for the 2007 season and was appointed captain.

He rejoined the renamed Harlequins RL midway through the 2007 season due to Doncaster's financial difficulties. He remained at the Harlequins RL before retiring at the end of the 2009 season.

== Coaching career ==
After retirement, Mbu coached London Skolars Under 16s in 2010. The team finished bottom of the table after winning only two games.

In October 2010 London Skolars appointed Joe Mbu as their head coach. now coaches Staines RFC June 2014

On 5 Nov 2021 Joe was re-appointed as head-coach of London Skolars, following the departure of Jermaine Coleman

In April 2026, Joe was appointed Director of Rugby at North Herts Crusaders, who competed in the National League Southern Conference.

He has coached Nigeria.

Sporting positions
Preceded by Jermaine Coleman; 2015-2021	Coach London Skolars; 2021-present	Succeeded by Incumbent
Preceded by Founded	Coach Nigeria; 2019-present	Succeeded by Incumbent
Preceded by James Massara; 2010	Coach London Skolars; 2010-2015	Succeeded by Jermaine Coleman; 2015-2021
