= 2010 Harlequins Rugby League season =

- Super League XV Rank: 13th
- Challenge Cup: Fifth round
- 2010 record: Wins: 8; draws: 0; losses: 21
- Points scored: For: 527; against: 884

Team information
- Chairman: David Hughes
- Head coach: Brian McDermott
- Captain: Rob Purdham & Chad Randall
- Stadium: The Stoop
- Avg. attendance: 3,312
- High attendance: 5,220

Top scorers
- Tries: Luke Dorn - 18
- Goals: Danny Orr - 56
- Points: Danny Orr - 128

Home colours	Away colours
← 2009	List of seasons	2011 →

The 2010 Harlequins Rugby League season was the thirty-first in the club's history and their fifteenth season in the Super League. The club was coached by Brian McDermott, competing in Super League XV, finishing in 13th place and reaching the Fifth round of the 2010 Challenge Cup.

Harlequins RL entered their 5th year under the Harlequins name after being previously known as the London Broncos, London Crusaders and Fulham RLFC.

== Super League XV table ==
Pos	Team	Pld	W	D	L	PF	PA	PD	Pts	Qualification
1	Wigan Warriors (L, C)	27	22	0	5	922	411	+511	44	Play-offs
2	St Helens	27	20	0	7	946	547	+399	40	Play-offs
3	Warrington Wolves	27	20	0	7	885	488	+397	40	Play-offs
4	Leeds Rhinos	27	17	1	9	725	561	+164	35	Play-offs
5	Huddersfield Giants	27	16	1	10	758	439	+319	33	Play-offs
6	Hull F.C.	27	16	0	11	569	584	−15	32	Play-offs
7	Hull Kingston Rovers	27	14	1	12	653	632	+21	29	Play-offs
8	Celtic Crusaders	27	12	0	15	547	732	−185	24	Play-offs
9	Castleford Tigers	27	11	0	16	648	766	−118	22	
10	Bradford Bulls	27	9	1	17	528	728	−200	19	
11	Wakefield Trinity Wildcats	27	9	0	18	539	741	−202	18	
12	Salford City Reds	27	8	0	19	448	857	−409	16	
13	Harlequins	27	7	0	20	494	838	−344	14	
14	Catalans Dragons	27	6	0	21	409	747	−338	12	

Source: Rugby League Project
Rules for classification: 1) Points; 2) Points difference; 3) Number of points scored;
(C) Champions; (L) League Leaders' Shield Winners

== Results and fixtures ==
=== Super League XV ===
==== Round 3 ====
Harlequins10–18 Wakefield Trinity Wildcats

Quins season got off to a disappointing start with defeat to Wakefield at home in a scrappy, penalty-ridden game. Daryl Millard put the away side in the lead on the 12th minute, but Ben Jones-Bishop got Quins back in the game with an unconverted score. The game continued its "you score, we score" pattern as Ben Jeffries and Jones-Bishop exchanged scores, but it was up to young winger Aaron Murphy to settle matters in the 56th minute. Both sides ended the game with 12 men as Louis McCarthy-Scarsbrook and Richard Moore were sent off for fighting.

== 2010 squad ==
No	Name	Position	Previous club
1	Chris Melling	Full-back	Wigan Warriors
2	Jon Wells	Wing	Wakefield Trinity Wildcats
3	Tony Clubb	Centre	Greenwich Admirals
4	David Howell	Centre	Canberra Raiders
5	Will Sharp	Wing	Harlequins RL
6	Luke Dorn	Stand-off	Castleford Tigers
7	Danny Orr	Scrum-half	Wigan Warriors
8	Karl Temata	Prop	New Zealand Warriors
9	Chad Randall	Hooker	Manly Sea Eagles
10	Louie McCarthy-Scarsbrook	Prop	Harlequins RL
11	Luke Williamson	Second-row	Manly Sea Eagles
13	Rob Purdham	Lock	Whitehaven
14	Oliver Wilkes	Prop	Wakefield Trinity Wildcats
15	Ben Kaye	Hooker	Leeds Rhinos
16	Jason Golden	Second-row	Wakefield Trinity Wildcats
17	Danny Ward	Prop	Hull Kingston Rovers
18	Ryan Esders	Second-row	Hull Kingston Rovers
20	Andy Ellis	Hooker	Barrow Raiders
21	Luke Gale	Scrum-half	Doncaster
22	Jamie O'Callaghan	Wing	Harlequins RL
23	Luke May	Centre	Harlequins RL
24	Dave Williams	Prop	Harlequins RL
25	Lamont Bryan	Centre	Harlequins RL
26	Ben Jones-Bishop	Full-back	Leeds Rhinos
27	Ben Jones	Prop	Leeds Rhinos
28	Ben Bolger	Second-row	St Albans Centurions
29	Adam Janowski	Prop	Harlequins RL

== Squad statistics ==
Squad Number	Name	International country	Position	Previous club	Appearances	Tries	Goals	Drop Goals	Points	Notes
1	Chris Melling	(England)	Fullback	Wigan Warriors	28	5	1	0	22	
2	Jon Wells	(England)	Wing	Wakefield Trinity Wildcats	0	0	0	0	0	
3	Tony Clubb	(England)	Centre	London Broncos Academy	29	7	0	0	28	
4	David Howell	(Australia)	Centre	Canberra Raiders	23	7	0	0	28	
5	Will Sharp	(Nigeria)	Wing	London Broncos Academy	29	7	0	0	28	
6	Luke Dorn	(Australia)	Stand-off	Castleford Tigers	19	18	0	0	72	
7	Danny Orr	(Australia)	Scrum-half	Wigan Warriors	25	4	56	0	128	
8	Karl Temata	(Cook Islands)	Prop	New Zealand Warriors	13	1	0	0	4	
9	Chad Randall	(Australia)	Hooker	Manly Sea Eagles	20	5	0	1	21	
10	Louie McCarthy-Scarsbrook	(England)	Prop	London Broncos Academy	26	1	0	0	4	
11	Luke Williamson	(Australia)	Second-row	Manly Sea Eagles	20	3	0	0	12	
13	Rob Purdham	(England)	Loose forward	Whitehaven	17	2	12	0	32	
14	Oliver Wilkes	(Scotland)	Prop	Wakefield Trinity Wildcats	29	0	0	0	0	
15	Ben Kaye	(England)	Hooker	Leeds Rhinos	1	0	0	0	0	
16	Jason Golden	(England)	Second-row	Wakefield Trinity Wildcats	17	1	0	0	4	
17	Danny Ward	(England)	Prop	Hull Kingston Rovers	26	1	0	0	4	
18	Ryan Esders	(England)	Second-row	Hull Kingston Rovers	14	1	0	0	4	
19	Matt James	(Wales)	Prop	Bradford Bulls	2	0	0	0	0	
20	Andy Ellis	(England)	Hooker	Barrow Raiders	13	3	0	0	12	
21	Luke Gale	(England)	Stand-off	Doncaster	23	5	9	2	40	
22	Jamie O'Callaghan	(Ireland)	Wing	London Broncos Academy	23	5	0	0	20	
23	Luke May	(England)	Centre	London Broncos Academy	2	0	0	0	0	
24	Dave Williams	(England)	Prop	London Broncos Academy	7	0	0	0	0	
25	Lamont Bryan	(Jamaica)	Wing	London Broncos Academy	14	1	0	0	4	
26	Ben Jones-Bishop	(Jamaica)	Wing, Fullback	Leeds Rhinos	18	11	0	0	44	loan
27	Ben Jones	(England)	Prop	London Broncos Academy	3	0	0	0	0	
28	Ben Bolger	(England)	Second-row	London Broncos Academy	15	0	0	0	0	
29	Martyn Smith	(England)	Hooker	London Broncos Academy	2	0	0	0	0	
31	Max Edwards	(England)	Scrum-half	London Broncos Academy	1	0	0	0	0	
33	Olsi Krasniqi	(Albania)	Prop	London Broncos Academy	10	1	0	0	4	
34	Kyle Bibb	(England)	Prop	Wakefield Trinity Wildcats	2	0	0	0	0	loan
35	Kevin Penny	(England)	Wing	Warrington Wolves	5	3	0	0	12	loan
36	David Mills	(Wales)	Prop	Hull Kingston Rovers	13	0	0	0	0	
