= 2009 Harlequins Rugby League season =

- Super League XIV Rank: 11th
- Challenge Cup: Fourth round
- 2009 record: Wins: 12; draws: 0; losses: 16
- Points scored: For: 607; against: 731

Team information
- Chairman: David Hughes
- Coach: Brian McDermott
- Captain: Rob Purdham
- Stadium: The Stoop
- Avg. attendance: 3,369
- High attendance: 4,378

Top scorers
- Tries: David Howell - 15
- Goals: Danny Orr - 45
- Points: Danny Orr - 106
Home colours	Away colours
← 2008	List of seasons	2010 →

The 2009 Harlequins Rugby League season was the thirtieth in the club's history and their fourteenth season in the Super League. The club was coached by Brian McDermott, competing in Super League XIV, finishing in 11th place and reaching the Fourth round of the 2009 Challenge Cup.

Harlequins RL – the only team in the Super League based in a capital city (London) attracted an average home crowd of just under 3,500.

== 2009 Harlequins Rugby League squad ==
No	Name	Position	Previous club
1	Chris Melling	Full back	Wigan Warriors
2	Jon Wells	Wing	Wakefield Trinity Wildcats
3	Matt Gafa	Centre	Canberra Raiders
4	David Howell	Centre	Canberra Raiders
5	Will Sharp	Wing	Harlequins RL
6	Luke Dorn	Stand off	Castleford Tigers
7	Danny Orr	Scrum half	Wigan Warriors
8	Karl Temata	Prop	New Zealand Warriors
9	Chad Randall	Hooker	Manly Sea Eagles
10	Louie McCarthy-Scarsbrook	Prop	Harlequins RL
11	Luke Williamson	Second row	Manly Sea Eagles
12	Chad Robinson	Second row	Parramatta Eels
13	Rob Purdham	Loose-forward	Whitehaven
14	Tony Clubb	Centre	Harlequins RL
15	Ben Kaye	Hooker	Leeds Rhinos
16	Gareth Haggerty	Prop	Salford City Reds
17	Danny Ward	Prop	Hull Kingston Rovers
18	Joe Mbu	Second row	Doncaster Lakers
19	Jason Golden	Loose forward	Wakefield Trinity Wildcats
20	Jon Grayshon	Prop	Huddersfield Giants
21	Luke Gale	Scrum half	Doncaster Lakers
22	Mick Nanyn	Centre	Oldham R.L.F.C.
23	Daniel Heckenberg	Prop	Manly Sea Eagles
24	Luke May	Centre	Harlequins RL
25	Dave Williams	Prop	Harlequins RL
26	Matt Gardner	Wing	Salford City Reds

== Transfers ==
Transfers for 2009 (in)

Name	Transferred from	Date released
Luke Dorn	Castleford Tigers	October 2008
Luke Williamson	Manly-Warringah Sea Eagles	October 2008
Chad Robinson	Parramatta Eels	October 2008
Ben Kaye	Leeds Rhinos	October 2008
Jason Golden	Wakefield Trinity Wildcats	October 2008
Mick Nanyn	Oldham R.L.F.C.	October 2008
Matt Gardner	Salford City Reds	October 2008

Transfers for 2009 (out)

Name	Transferred to	Date released
Mark McLinden	Halifax	October 2008
Rikki Sheriffe	Salford City Reds	October 2008
Scott Hill	Retired	October 2008
Julien Rinaldi	Union Treiziste Catalan	October 2008
Henry Paul	Leeds Carnegie	October 2008
David Tootill		October 2008
Dwayne Barker	Halifax	October 2008
Michael Worrincy	Bradford Bulls	October 2008
Lamont Bryan		October 2008
Joe Walsh	Halifax	October 2008

== 2009 fixtures and results ==
Competition	Round	Opponent	Result	Score	Home/away	Venue	Attendance	Date
Friendly	N/A	Crusaders	N/A	A-A ^{†}	Home	The Twickenham Stoop	N/A	29 January 2009
Super League XIV	2 ^{‡}	Bradford Bulls	N/A	P–P ^{1}	Home	The Twickenham Stoop	N/A	8 Feb 2009
Super League XIV	1	Castleford Tigers	Win	8–12	Away	The Jungle	7,049	15 February 2009
Friendly	N/A	Manly-Warringah Sea Eagles	Lose	26–34	Home	The Twickenham Stoop	~6,000	22 February 2009
Super League XIV	3	Wigan Warriors	Lose	18–24	Home	The Twickenham Stoop	3,883	28 February 2009
Super League XIV	4	Salford City Reds	Win	18–48	Away	The Willows	3,367	6 Mar 2009
Super League XIV	5	Warrington Wolves	Win	60–8	Home	The Twickenham Stoop	3,206	14 March 2009
Super League XIV	6	Huddersfield Giants	Lose	46–6	Away	Galpharm Stadium	6,356	22 March 2009
Super League XIV	7	Hull F.C.	Win	22–12	Home	The Twickenham Stoop	3,593	28 March 2009
Challenge Cup 2009	4	Huddersfield Giants	Loss	16–42	Home	The Twickenham Stoop	2,500	4 April 2009
Super League XIV	8	Catalans Dragons	Loss	24–28	Home	The Twickenham Stoop	2,539	9 Apr 2009
Super League XIV	9	Celtic Crusaders	Win	18–40	Away	Brewery Field	3,009	13 April 2009
Super League XIV	10	Hull Kingston Rovers	Loss	12–32	Home	The Twickenham Stoop	3,492	19 April 2009
Super League XIV	11	Leeds Rhinos	Win	4–21	Away	Headingley Stadium	13,912	24 April 2009
Super League XIV	12	Salford City Reds	Win	16–24	Neutral	Murrayfield Stadium	29,627	2 May 2009
Super League XIV	13	Wakefield Trinity Wildcats	Win	24–17	Home	The Twickenham Stoop	3,612	17 May 2009
Super League XIV	14	St. Helens	Loss	22–12	Away	GPW Recruitment Stadium	9,359	22 May 2009
Super League XIV	15	Celtic Crusaders	Win	26–6	Home	The Twickenham Stoop	2,245	6 June 2009
Super League XIV	16	Hull Kingston Rovers	Win	10–40	Away	New Craven Park	7,874	14 June 2009
Super League XIV	17	Leeds Rhinos	Loss	14–48	Home	The Twickenham Stoop	4,378	20 June 2009
Super League XIV	18	Wakefield Trinity Wildcats	Loss	20–18	Away	Belle Vue	5,079	28 June 2009
Super League XIV	19	Wigan Warriors	Loss	40–12	Away	JJB Stadium	14,977	3 Jul 2009
Super League XIV	20	Huddersfield Giants	Loss	16–32	Home	The Twickenham Stoop	3,916	11 Jul 2009
Super League XIV	21	Catalans Dragons	Loss	38–16	Away	Stade Gilbert Brutus	8,324	19 July 2009
Super League XIV	22	St Helens	Loss	24–44	Home	The Twickenham Stoop	4,258	25 July 2009
Super League XIV	23	Bradford Bulls	Win	14–22	Away	Grattan Stadium	7,813	2 Aug 2009
Super League XIV	2	Bradford Bulls	Loss	18–42	Home	The Twickenham Stoop	3,112	1 Aug 2009
Super League XIV	24	Salford City Reds	Loss	22–26	Home	The Twickenham Stoop	2,612	15 August 2009
Super League XIV	25	Hull FC			Away	KC Stadium		21 August 2009
Super League XIV	26	Castleford Tigers			Home	The Twickenham Stoop		5 Sep 2009
Super League XIV	27	Warrington Wolves			Away	Halliwell Jones Stadium		13 September 2009

†: Game called off due to flooded pitch.

‡: Game rearranged to make Harlequins RL available for a Manly-Warringah Sea Eagles' warm-up game for the 2009 World Club Challenge.

1: Game postponed due to frozen pitch.

== Super League XIV table ==
Pos	Team	Pld	W	D	L	PF	PA	PD	Pts	Qualification
1	Leeds Rhinos (L, C)	27	21	0	6	805	453	+352	42	Play-offs
2	St Helens	27	19	0	8	733	466	+267	38	Play-offs
3	Huddersfield Giants	27	18	0	9	690	416	+274	36	Play-offs
4	Hull Kingston Rovers	27	17	1	9	650	516	+134	35	Play-offs
5	Wakefield Trinity Wildcats	27	16	0	11	685	609	+76	32	Play-offs
6	Wigan Warriors	27	15	0	12	659	551	+108	30	Play-offs
7	Castleford Tigers	27	14	0	13	645	702	−57	28	Play-offs
8	Catalans Dragons	27	13	0	14	613	660	−47	26	Play-offs
9	Bradford Bulls	27	12	1	14	653	668	−15	25	
10	Warrington Wolves	27	12	0	15	649	705	−56	24	
11	Harlequins	27	11	0	16	591	691	−100	22	
12	Hull F.C.	27	10	0	17	502	623	−121	20	
13	Salford City Reds	27	7	0	20	456	754	−298	14	
14	Celtic Crusaders	27	3	0	24	357	874	−517	6	

Source: Rugby League Project
Rules for classification: 1) Points; 2) Points difference; 3) Number of points scored;
(C) Champions; (L) League Leaders' Shield Winners

== Squad statistics ==
Squad Number	Name	International country	Position	Previous club	Appearances	Tries	Goals	Drop Goals	Points	Notes
1	Chris Melling	(England)	Fullback	Wigan Warriors	27	11	3	0	50	
2	Jon Wells	(England)	Wing	Wakefield Trinity Wildcats	19	0	0	0	0	
3	Matt Gafa	(Malta)	Centre	Canberra Raiders	25	7	4	0	36	
4	David Howell	(Australia)	Centre	Canberra Raiders	20	15	0	0	60	
5	Will Sharp	(Nigeria)	Wing	Harlequins RL Academy	26	5	0	0	20	
6	Luke Dorn	(Australia)	Stand-off	Castleford Tigers	22	13	0	0	52	
7	Danny Orr	(England)	Scrum-half	Wigan Warriors	24	4	45	0	106	
8	Karl Temata	(Cook Islands)	Prop	New Zealand Warriors	22	2	0	0	8	
9	Chad Randall	(Australia)	Hooker	Manly Sea Eagles	25	9	0	0	36	
10	Louie McCarthy-Scarsbrook	(England)	Prop	Harlequins RL Academy	28	6	0	0	24	
11	Luke Williamson	(Australia)	Second-row	Manly Sea Eagles	22	3	0	0	12	
12	Chad Robinson	(Australia)	Second-row	Parramatta Eels	15	2	0	0	8	
13	Rob Purdham	(England)	Loose forward	Whitehaven	18	3	39	1	91	
14	Tony Clubb	(England)	Centre	Harlequins RL Academy	23	5	0	0	20	
15	Ben Kaye	(England)	Hooker	Leeds Rhinos	14	0	0	0	0	
16	Gareth Haggerty	(Ireland)	Prop	Salford City Reds	13	2	0	0	8	
17	Danny Ward	(England)	Prop	Hull Kingston Rovers	23	3	0	0	12	
18	Joe Mbu	(Zaire)	Second-row	Doncaster Lakers	6	1	0	0	4	
19	Jason Golden	(England)	Second-row	Wakefield Trinity Wildcats	25	2	0	0	8	
20	Jon Grayshon	(England)	Prop	Huddersfield Giants	2	0	0	0	0	
21	Luke Gale	(England)	Stand-off	Doncaster Lakers	21	6	2	0	28	
22	Mick Nanyn	(Scotland)	Centre	Oldham Roughyeds	0	0	0	0	0	
23	Daniel Heckenberg	(Scotland)	Prop	Manly Sea Eagles	23	1	0	0	4	
24	Luke May	(England)	Centre	Harlequins RL Academy	1	0	0	0	0	
25	Dave Williams	(England)	Prop	Harlequins RL Academy	1	0	0	0	0	
26	Matt Gardner	(Brazil)	Wing	Salford City Reds	9	2	0	0	8	
29	Dylan Skee	(Australia)	Stand-off	Harlequins RL Academy	2	0	0	0	0	
30	Jamie O'Callaghan	(Ireland)	Wing	Harlequins RL Academy	5	1	0	0	4	
31	Sam Thompson	(England)	Prop	St Helens	2	0	0	0	0	
32	Ryan Esders	(England)	Second-row	Hull Kingston Rovers	8	2	0	0	8	
34	Lamont Bryan	(Jamaica)	Wing	Harlequins RL Academy	5	0	0	0	0	
