= 2014 Bradford Bulls season =

- Super League XIX Rank: 13th - Relegated
- Play-off result: Did not qualify
- Challenge Cup: Quarter-final
- 2014 record: Wins: 10; draws: 0; losses: 20
- Points scored: For: 615; against: 1056

Team information
- Chairman: Marc Green
- Head Coach: James Lowes (was Francis Cummins)
- Captain: Matt Diskin
- Stadium: Odsal Stadium
- Avg. attendance: 6,235
- High attendance: 10,106 vs. Leeds Rhinos

Top scorers
- Tries: Luke Gale (14)
- Goals: Jamie Foster (50)
- Points: Luke Gale (147)
← 2013	List of seasons	2015 →

This article details the Bradford Bulls rugby league football club's 2014 season, the 19th season of the Super League era.

== Season review ==
June 2013

The Bulls announced their first signing for the 2014 season in the form of Warrington Wolves props forward Gareth Carvell on a 2-year deal.

July 2013

Bradford signed winger Luke George and second rower Dale Ferguson from Huddersfield Giants. Both of these players signed 2-year deals with the club.

August 2013

The Bulls announced that Matty Blythe's loan deal would become permanent and signed him on a 3 Year Deal from Warrington Wolves. Also, Bradford signed young stand-off Lee Gaskell on a 2 Year Deal from St. Helens.

September 2013

It was revealed that centre Keith Lulia had signed a deal with Wests Tigers as he wanted to raise his newborn child in Australia. Also leaving the club is veteran Jamie Langley (the last remaining survivor of the 2005 squad), Langley's contract was not renewed by coach Francis Cummins and Langley signed with Hull Kingston Rovers. Promising young fullback Curtis Naughton also went to Australia as his mother was emigrating there so Naughton followed suit. Michael Platt's contract was also not renewed so he would be leaving the club as well.

October 2013

Two signings were revealed in October. The first being New Zealand centre Adam Henry from NRL champions Sydney Roosters. The second signing was Samoa forward Frank Winterstein on a 1-year deal from Widnes Vikings.

November 2013

The month started off bad for the Bulls as it was announced that forward John Bateman was sold to Wigan Warriors for a 6 figure sum. Bateman would join the Super League champions on a 3-year deal. Co-captain Heath L'Estrange was released on compassionate grounds so he could return to Australia. Young centre Sam Wood signed a 3 Year Extension keeping him at Odsal until after the 2016 season. Winger Elliot Kear also signed a 1-year extension to his current contract.

December 2013

It was announced that the Bulls would play Hull F.C. in a pre-season friendly whilst the match against Dewsbury Rams would be moved to 26 January. The Bulls revealed that Matt Diskin would continue on as captain for the 2014 season. Luke Gale was announced as vice-captain for the season.

January 2014

Frank Winterstein left the Bulls to return home to Australia to pursue a career in rugby union. Bradford announced that they had recruited Warrington Wolves youngsters James Saltonstall, Joe Philbin and Tom Walker on short-term loan deals. The Bulls won their first pre-season match against Hull F.C. 30–18. Nick Scruton, Adrian Purtell, Danny Addy, Jamie Foster and new boy Adam Henry scored the tries whilst Foster converted all 5 goals. In the second pre-season friendly the Bulls fielded a team of academy players with a few first-team members, the youthful Bulls lost 38–4 to Dewsbury Rams with James Saltonstall scoring Bradford's only try.

February 2014

The Bulls finished pre-season with an embarrassing 66–10 loss to Castleford Tigers. Bradford's tries came from Elliot Kear and Nick Scruton with Jamie Foster converting one of the tries. The week after it was announced that James Saltonstall would stay at Odsal on another month's loan deal. Vice-captain Luke Gale signed an extension to his contract, keeping him at Bradford until the end of the 2016 season. In the week leading up to the first Super League game, new signing Gareth Carvell left the Bulls and joined former club Hull F.C. on a 1 Year Deal. In wake of this news, the Bulls signed Danny Bridge on a 1-month loan deal from Warrington Wolves. Just before the season kicked off last year's top try scorer Jarrod Sammut departed the Bulls and joined Wakefield Trinity Wildcats on a 2 Year Deal. The opening day of the season did not go well for the Bulls as they lost 36–18 to Castleford Tigers. Danny Addy, Jamie Foster and Adrian Purtell scored for the Bulls whilst Foster kicked 3 goals. It was announced that Anthony Mullally would join on a 1-month loan from Huddersfield Giants. The Bulls got their first win of the campaign as they beat Wakefield Trinity Wildcats 23–10. The tries came from Adrian Purtell, Brett Kearney, Luke George and Adam O'Brien. Jamie Foster kicked 3 goals whilst Luke Gale slotted over a drop goal to give Bradford the win.

March 2014

Bradford went into administration again as potential buyers backed out following the 6-point deduction to the Bulls. During administration, Nick Scruton was sold to Wakefield Trinity Wildcats on a 1 Year Deal. The Bulls reduced their points deduction to minus 2 with a well earned 25–12 win against London Broncos. Luke Gale, Adam Sidlow, Danny Addy and Tom Olbison scored the tries whilst Jamie Foster kicked 4 goals and Gale added a drop goal. Bradford signed Leeds Rhinos halfback Liam Sutcliffe on a 1-month loan. They also brought in Wigan Warriors forward Greg Burke on a 1-month loan deal. Bradford lost to Hull F.C. 44–16 the following weekend with tries coming from Matt Diskin, Adrian Purtell and Adam Henry with Foster kicking 2 goals. The next game wasn't much better as the Bulls were reduced to 1 prop following injuries to Sidlow and Burke and Anthony Mullally being ineligible to play against Huddersfield Giants. The depleted Bulls lost 66–18 with Henry scoring 2 tries and Adam O'Brien also scoring, Foster converted 3 goals. Mullally's loan stay was extended until the end of the season. Bradford's season got worse as they lost 16–0 to Hull Kingston Rovers before losing the last March game 22–18 to Widnes Vikings, Liam Sutcliffe, Brett Kearney and Elliot Kear all scored while Luke Gale kicked 3 goals. The Bulls were taken over by Marc Green at the end of March.

April 2014

The Bulls announced their first signing since the ownership change of the club and it was Jamal Fakir the ex-Catalan prop who joined the club until the end of the season. The Bulls progressed to the next round of the Challenge Cup with a comprehensive 60–6 victory over Oldham. Luke Gale scored a hat-trick while Elliot Kear grabbed a brace. Brett Kearney, Adam O'Brien, Danny Addy, Adam Henry, Jamie Foster and Dale Ferguson also scored, Gale kicked 8 conversions. The following week the Bulls went down 38–24 to Salford Red Devils with Rangi Chase proving the difference between the two sides. Adrian Purtell, Adam Sidlow, Kear and Henry all scored and Foster kicked 4 goals. The derby game against Leeds Rhinos followed with Lee Gaskell scoring a try and Gale kicking the goal in Bradford's 46–6 loss. The final league game in April proved to be Bradford's biggest ever loss in Super League as they were beaten 84-6 by Wigan Warriors, Gale scored all 6 points. Jay Pitts and Joe Arundel signed for the Bulls on loan for the rest of the season. April ended on a high for Bradford as they came back from 16-0 down to beat Catalans Dragons 33–20 in the Challenge Cup. Foster grabbed a couple of tries whilst Gaskell, Gale and Purtell also scored, Foster, kicked 6 goals and Gale slotted a drop goal.

May 2014

Antonio Kaufusi joined the Bulls on a one-month loan from Huddersfield Giants. The win in the cup revitalised the Bulls as they beat Warrington Wolves 34–28 in their next league match. Adrian Purtell scored two tries whilst Jamie Foster, Brett Kearney, Tom Olbison and Elliot Kear also scored, Foster slotted 5 goals to ensure the Bulls won for the first time in 7 league games. However, they were brought crashing down to earth as St Helens R.F.C. were rampant and hammered Bradford 50–0. The Magic Weekend proved yet again too hard of a task for the Bulls as they were dispatched 54-16 by Huddersfield Giants, Danny Addy scored a try and Foster grabbed 2 and kicked 2 goals. Leeds Rhinos re-signed and then loaned youngsters Jordan Baldwinson and Mason Tonks to the Bulls. The following week the Catalans Dragons gained revenge for their cup exit as they beat the Bulls 46–4, Foster scored Bradford's only points.

June 2014

== 2014 milestones ==
- Round 1: Adam Henry, Lee Gaskell and Danny Bridge made their debuts for the Bulls.
- Round 1: Nick Scruton made his 100th appearance for the Bulls.
- Round 1: Manase Manuokafoa made his 50th appearance for the Bulls.
- Round 2: Luke George and Anthony Mullally made their debuts for the Bulls.
- Round 2: Luke George scored his 1st try for the Bulls.
- Round 4: Greg Burke and Liam Sutcliffe made their debuts for the Bulls.
- Round 4: Adam Henry scored his 1st try for the Bulls.
- Round 7: Liam Sutcliffe scored his 1st try for the Bulls.
- CCR4: Jamal Fakir and Dale Ferguson made their debut for the Bulls.
- CCR4: Dale Ferguson scored his 1st try for the Bulls.
- CCR4: Luke Gale scored his 1st hat-trick try for the Bulls.
- CCR4: Luke Gale reached 200 points for the Bulls.
- Round 8: Jamie Foster reached 200 points for the Bulls.
- Round 9: Brett Kearney made his 100th appearance for the Bulls.
- Round 9: Lee Gaskell scored his 1st try for the Bulls.
- Round 10: Sam Bates made his debut for the Bulls.
- CCR5: Jay Pitts made his debut for the Bulls.
- Round 11: Joe Arundel and Antonio Kaufusi made their debut for the Bulls.
- Round 12: Elliot Kear made his 50th appearance for the Bulls.
- Round 13: Jamie Foster kicked his 100th goal for the Bulls.
- Round 14: Jordan Baldwinson made his debut for the Bulls.
- Round 14: Luke Gale made his 50th appearance for the Bulls.
- Round 18: Adrian Purtell made his 50th appearance for the Bulls.
- Round 18: Luke Gale kicked his 100th goal for the Bulls.
- Round 18: Jay Pitts scored his 1st try for the Bulls.
- Round 19: Danny Williams made his debut for the Bulls.
- Round 19: Jamal Fakir scored his 1st try for the Bulls.
- Round 20: Joe Arundel scored his 1st try for the Bulls.
- Round 22: Danny Williams scored his 1st try for the Bulls.
- Round 25: Lee Gaskell scored his 1st hat-trick for the Bulls.
- Round 26: Brad Adams made his debut for the Bulls.
- Round 26: Luke Gale reached 300 points for the Bulls.
- Round 27: Emmerson Whittel made his debut for the Bulls.
- Round 27: Luke Gale scored his 1st four-try haul and 2nd hat-trick for the Bulls.

== Pre-season friendlies ==
Legend
Win
Draw
Loss

Bulls score is first.

Date	Competition	Vrs	H/A	Venue	Result	Score	Tries	Goals	Att	Report
19 January 2014	Pre Season	Hull F.C.	H	Odsal Stadium	W	30–18	Scruton, Purtell, Addy, Foster, Henry	Foster 5/5	2,472	Report
26 January 2014	Pre Season	Dewsbury Rams	A	Rams Stadium	L	4–38	Saltonstall	Foster 0/1	1,239	Report
2 February 2014	Pre Season	Castleford Tigers	H	Odsal Stadium	L	10–66	Kear, Scruton	Foster 1/2	1,987	Report

== Player appearances ==
- Friendly Games Only

FB=Fullback	C=Centre	W=Winger	SO=Stand Off	SH=Scrum half	P=Prop	H=Hooker	SR=Second row	LF=Loose forward	B=Bench

No	Player	1	2	3
1	Brett Kearney			
2	Elliot Kear	W	FB	W
3	Adrian Purtell	C	x	C
4	Matty Blythe			
5	Jamie Foster	W	W	FB
6	Jarrod Sammut	SO	x	x
7	Luke Gale	SH	x	SH
8	Nick Scruton	P	x	P
9	Matt Diskin			B
10	Gareth Carvell	P	x	x
11	Tom Olbison	SR	x	SR
12	Dale Ferguson			SR
13	Chev Walker	B	x	B
14	Manase Manuokafoa	B	P	P
15	Adam Sidlow	B	P	B
16	Danny Addy	SR	H	SO
17	Lee Gaskell	FB	SO	x
18	James Donaldson	L	x	L
19	Adam O'Brien	H	x	H
20	Luke George			x
21	Adam Henry	C	C	C
22	Sam Wood	B	C	x
23	Oliver Roberts	B	SR	B
24	Alex Mellor	B	x	x
25	Nathan Conroy	B	B	B
n/a	Adam Brook	B	SH	x
n/a	James Saltonstall	B	W	W
n/a	Joe Philbin	B	SR	x
n/a	Tom Walker	x	B	x
n/a	Emmerson Whittle	x	L	x
n/a	Sam Bates	x	B	B
n/a	Brad Adams	x	B	x
n/a	Steve Copeland	x	B	x
n/a	Nick Gomersall	x	B	x
n/a	Jordan Gale	x	B	x

= Injured

= Suspended

== Table ==
Super League XIX
Pos	Team	Pld	W	D	L	PF	PA	PD	Pts	Qualification
1	St Helens (L, C)	27	19	0	8	796	563	+233	38	Play-offs
2	Wigan Warriors	27	18	1	8	834	429	+405	37	Play-offs
3	Huddersfield Giants	27	17	3	7	785	626	+159	37	Play-offs
4	Castleford Tigers	27	17	2	8	814	583	+231	36	Play-offs
5	Warrington Wolves	27	17	1	9	793	515	+278	35	Play-offs
6	Leeds Rhinos	27	15	2	10	685	421	+264	32	Play-offs
7	Catalans Dragons	27	14	1	12	733	667	+66	29	Play-offs
8	Widnes Vikings	27	13	1	13	611	725	−114	27	Play-offs
9	Hull Kingston Rovers	27	10	3	14	627	665	−38	23	
10	Salford Red Devils	27	11	1	15	608	695	−87	23	
11	Hull F.C.	27	10	2	15	653	586	+67	22	
12	Wakefield Trinity Wildcats	27	10	1	16	557	750	−193	21	
13	Bradford Bulls (R)	27	8	0	19	512	984	−472	10 (Note: Bradford Bulls deducted 6 points on 25 February 2014 for entering administration)	Relegation to Championship
14	London Broncos (R)	27	1	0	26	438	1237	−799	2	Relegation to Championship

(C) Champions; (L) League Leaders' Shield Winners; (R) Relegated

== 2014 fixtures and results ==
Legend
Win
Draw
Loss

2014 First Utility Super League

Date	Competition	Rnd	Vrs	H/A	Venue	Result	Score	Tries	Goals	Att	Live on TV	Report
16 February 2014	Super League XIX	1	Castleford Tigers	H	Odsal Stadium	L	18-36	Addy, Foster, Purtell	Foster 3/3	8,214	-	Report
20 February 2014	Super League XIX	2	Wakefield Trinity Wildcats	A	Belle Vue	W	23-10	George, Kearney, O'Brien, Purtell	Foster 3/5, Gale 1 DG	4,049	Sky Sports	Report
2 March 2014	Super League XIX	3	London Broncos	H	Odsal Stadium	W	25-12	Addy, Gale, Olbison, Sidlow	Foster 4/4, Gale 1 DG	8,500	-	Report
7 March 2014	Super League XIX	4	Hull F.C.	A	KC Stadium	L	16-44	Diskin, Henry, Purtell	Foster 2/3	11,307	-	Report
16 March 2014	Super League XIX	5	Huddersfield Giants	H	Odsal Stadium	L	18-66	Henry (2), O'Brien	Foster 3/3	6,781	-	Report
23 March 2014	Super League XIX	6	Hull Kingston Rovers	A	Craven Park	L	0-16	-	-	7,008	-	Report
28 March 2014	Super League XIX	7	Widnes Vikings	A	Halton Stadium	L	18-22	Kear, Kearney, Sutcliffe	Gale 3/3	5,581	-	Report
11 April 2014	Super League XIX	8	Salford Red Devils	H	Odsal Stadium	L	24-38	Henry, Kear, Purtell, Sidlow	Foster 4/4	6,144	-	Report
17 April 2014	Super League XIX	9	Leeds Rhinos	H	Odsal Stadium	L	6-46	Gaskell	Gale 1/1	10,106	-	Report
21 April 2014	Super League XIX	10	Wigan Warriors	A	DW Stadium	L	6-84	Gale	Gale 1/1	15,529	-	Report
4 May 2014	Super League XIX	11	Warrington Wolves	H	Odsal Stadium	W	34-28	Purtell (2), Foster, Kear, Kearney, Olbison	Foster 5/7	6,173	-	Report
11 May 2014	Super League XIX	12	St. Helens	H	Odsal Stadium	L	0-50	-	-	6,311	-	Report
18 May 2014	Magic Weekend	13	Huddersfield Giants	N	Etihad Stadium	L	16-54	Foster (2), Addy	Foster 2/3	28,213	Sky Sports	Report
24 May 2014	Super League XIX	14	Catalans Dragons	A	Stade Gilbert Brutus	L	4-46	Foster	Foster 0/1	6,890	Sky Sports	Report
1 June 2014	Super League XIX	15	Wakefield Trinity Wildcats	H	Odsal Stadium	W	20-12	Purtell (2), Olbison	Gale 4/4	6,249	-	Report
15 June 2014	Super League XIX	16	Salford Red Devils	A	AJ Bell Stadium	L	18-46	Kear, O'Brien, Olbison	Gale 3/3	3,407	-	Report
20 June 2014	Super League XIX	17	Hull Kingston Rovers	H	Odsal Stadium	L	18-44	Addy, Kear, O'Brien	Gale 3/3	5,601	Sky Sports	Report
29 June 2014	Super League XIX	18	Warrington Wolves	A	Halliwell Jones Stadium	L	24-50	Kearney, Olbison, Pitts, Purtell	Gale 4/4	9,003	-	Report
6 July 2014	Super League XIX	19	Catalans Dragons	H	Odsal Stadium	L	30-32	Gale (2), Fakir, Henry, Olbison	Gale 5/5	5,188	-	Report
11 July 2014	Super League XIX	20	St. Helens	A	Langtree Park	L	22-46	Arundel, Foster, Gale, Purtell	Foster 3/4	10,238	-	Report
20 July 2014	Super League XIX	21	Huddersfield Giants	A	Galpharm Stadium	L	26-52	George (2), Kearney (2), O'Brien	Foster 3/5	6,145	-	Report
27 July 2014	Super League XIX	22	Wigan Warriors	H	Odsal Stadium	W	16-8	Arundel, Blythe, Williams	Gale 2/3	6,535	-	Report
1 August 2014	Super League XIX	23	Leeds Rhinos	A	Headingley Stadium	W	20-14	Gale, Gaskell, Williams	Gale 4/5	16,009	-	Report
17 August 2014	Super League XIX	24	Hull F.C.	H	Odsal Stadium	W	34-28	Arundel (2), Addy, Foster, Pitts, Sidlow	Foster 5/6	6,337	-	Report
31 August 2014	Super League XIX	25	Castleford Tigers	A	The Jungle	L	18-32	Gaskell (3)	Gale 3/3	7,428	-	Report
7 September 2014	Super League XIX	26	Widnes Vikings	H	Odsal Stadium	L	12-32	Olbison, Walker	Gale 2/2	7,438	-	Report
13 September 2014	Super League XIX	27	London Broncos	A	The Hive	W	46-36	Gale (4), Arundel, Kearney, Manuokafoa, Pitts	Foster 7/8	1,402	-	Report

== Player appearances ==
- Super League Only

FB=Fullback	C=Centre	W=Winger	SO=Stand-off	SH=Scrum half	PR=Prop	H=Hooker	SR=Second row	L=Loose forward	B=Bench

No	Player	1	2	3	4	5	6	7	8	9	10	11	12	13	14	15	16	17	18	19	20	21	22	23	24	25	26	27
1	Brett Kearney	FB	FB	FB	FB	FB	FB	FB	FB	FB	FB	SO							FB	FB	FB	FB	FB		FB	FB	FB	FB
2	Elliot Kear	W		B	W	B	W	W	W	W	W	W	FB	W	W	W	W	W	W				W	FB				
3	Adrian Purtell	C	C	C	C	C	C	C	C	C	C	SR	SR	SR	C	C	C	C	C	C	C	C						
4	Matty Blythe						B	SR	SR	C						C	SR	C	W	W	B		B	W	B	B	B	
5	Jamie Foster	W	W	W	W	W			W			W	W	W	W						W	W			W			W
7	Luke Gale	SH	SH	SH	SH	SH	SH	SH	SH	SH	SH	SH		SH	SH	SH	SH	SH	SH	SH	SH	SH	SH	SH	SH	SH	SH	SH
8	Nick Scruton	P	P	x	x	x	x	x	x	x	x	x	x	x	x	x	x	x	x	x	x	x	x	x	x	x	x	x
9	Matt Diskin	H	H	H	H	H	H		H			H	H	H		H	H	H	H	H								
11	Tom Olbison	SR		B	SR	SR	SR	SR		B	SR	B	SR	SR	SR	SR	SR	SR	SR	SR	SR	SR	SR	SR	SR	B	SR	SR
12	Dale Ferguson								SR	SR						B								B	B	SR		
13	Chev Walker	B	SR	SR		P		P	P	B	L		B	P		L	P	B	B	B		SR					C	C
14	Manase Manuokafoa	B	B	P	B	P	P	P	P	P	P				B	P	P	B	P	P	P	P	P	P	P	P	P	P
15	Adam Sidlow	P	P	P	P		P		B	B		P	P	P	P	B	B	P	P	P	P	B	B	B	P	P	P	x
16	Danny Addy	SR	B	SO	SO	SR	SR	B		B	SR	L	SH	SO	SO	SO	SO	SO	L	B	B	B	B	B	B	B	L	SO
17	Lee Gaskell	SO	SO						SO	SO	SO	FB	SO	FB	FB	FB	FB	FB	SO	SO	SO	SO	SO	SO	SO	SO	SO	
18	James Donaldson	L	L	L	L	L	L	L	L	L					L	B	L	L	B	L	L	L	L	L	L	L	B	L
19	Adam O'Brien	B	B	B	B	B	B	H	B	H	H	B	B	B	H		B	B	B	B	H	H	H	H	H	H	H	H
20	Luke George	x	W	W	x	W	x	x	x	x	x	x	B	C	x	W	W	W	x	x	x	W	x	x	x	W	x	x
21	Adam Henry	C	C	C	C	C	C	C	C	W	C	C	C	C	B		C		C	C	C		C	C	C	C	W	W
22	Sam Wood	x	x	x	x	x	W	W	x	x	W	x	W	B	x	x	x	x	x	x	x	x	x	x	x	x	x	x
23	Oliver Roberts	x	x	x	x	B	x	B	x	x	B	x	x	x	x	x	x	x	x	x	x	x	x	x	x	x	x	x
24	Alex Mellor	x	x	x	x	x	x	x	x	x	B	B	B	B	x	x	x	x	x	x	x	B	B	B	x	x	x	B
25	Nathan Conroy	x	x	x	x	x	x	x	x	x	B	x	x	x	B	x	x	x	x	x	x	x	x	x	x	x	x	B
26	Liam Sutcliffe	x	x	x	B	SO	SO	SO	x	x	x	x	x	x	x	x	x	x	x	x	x	x	x	x	x	x	x	x
27	Greg Burke	x	x	x	B				x	x	x	x	x	x	x	x	x	x	x	x	x	x	x	x	x	x	x	x
28	Danny Bridge	B	SR	SR	SR	B	B	B		SR	x	x	x	x	x	x	x	x	x	x	x	x	x	x	x	x	x	x
29	Anthony Mullally	x	B	B	P		B	B	B	x	x	x	x	x	x	x	x	x	x	x	x	x	x	x	x	x	x	x
30	Jamal Fakir	x	x	x	x	x	x	x	B	P	P					B	B	B		B	B	P	P	P		B	B	
31	Sam Bates	x	x	x	x	x	x	x	x	x	B	B	x	x	x	x	x	x	x	x	x	x	x	x	x	x	x	x
33	Jay Pitts	x	x	x	x	x	x	x	x	x	x	SR	L	L	SR	SR		SR	SR	SR	SR	B	SR	SR	SR	SR	SR	SR
34	Joe Arundel	x	x	x	x	x	x	x	x	x	x	C	C	B	C						B	C	C	C	C	C	B	C
35	Antonio Kaufusi	x	x	x	x	x	x	x	x	x	x	P	P	x	P	P					x	x	x	x	x	x	x	x
36	Jordan Baldwinson	x	x	x	x	x	x	x	x	x	x	x	x	x	B		B	P	B						B			P
37	Mason Tonks	x	x	x	x	x	x	x	x	x	x	x	x	x	x	x	x	x	x	x	x	x	x	x	x	x	x	x
38	Danny Williams	x	x	x	x	x	x	x	x	x	x	x	x	x	x	x	x	x	x	W	W		W	W	W	W	W	x
39	Brad Adams	x	x	x	x	x	x	x	x	x	x	x	x	x	x	x	x	x	x	x	x	x	x	x	x	x	C	B
40	Emmerson Whittel	x	x	x	x	x	x	x	x	x	x	x	x	x	x	x	x	x	x	x	x	x	x	x	x	x	x	B

= Injured

= Suspended

== Challenge Cup ==
Legend
Win
Draw
Loss

Date	Competition	Rnd	Vrs	H/A	Venue	Result	Score	Tries	Goals	Att	TV	Report
6 April 2014	Cup	4th	Oldham R.L.F.C.	H	Odsal Stadium	W	60-6	Gale (3), Kear (2), Addy, Ferguson, Foster, Henry, Kearney, O'Brien	Gale 8/11	2,788	-	Report
27 April 2014	Cup	5th	Catalans Dragons	H	Odsal Stadium	W	33-20	Foster (2), Gale, Gaskell, Purtell	Foster 6/6, Gale 1 DG	2,341	-	Report
8 June 2014	Cup	QF	Warrington Wolves	H	Odsal Stadium	L	10-46	George, Kear	Gale 1/2	5,064	BBC Sport	Report

== Player appearances ==
- Challenge Cup Games only

FB=Fullback	C=Centre	W=Winger	SO=Stand Off	SH=Scrum half	P=Prop	H=Hooker	SR=Second row	L=Loose forward	B=Bench

No	Player	4	5	QF
1	Brett Kearney	FB	FB	
2	Elliot Kear	W	W	W
3	Adrian Purtell	C	C	C
4	Matty Blythe	SR		C
5	Jamie Foster	B	W	
7	Luke Gale	SH	SH	SH
9	Matt Diskin		L	H
11	Tom Olbison		B	SR
12	Dale Ferguson	SR		
13	Chev Walker	P		P
14	Manase Manuokafoa	P	P	P
15	Adam Sidlow		SR	B
16	Danny Addy	SO		SO
17	Lee Gaskell		SO	FB
18	James Donaldson	L		L
19	Adam O'Brien	H	H	B
20	Luke George	x	C	W
21	Adam Henry	C	B	B
22	Sam Wood	W	x	x
23	Oliver Roberts	B	x	x
24	Alex Mellor	x	x	x
25	Nathan Conroy	B	B	x
26	Liam Sutcliffe	x	x	x
27	Greg Burke	x	x	x
28	Danny Bridge	x	x	x
29	Anthony Mullally	x	x	x
30	Jamal Fakir	B	P	B
31	Sam Bates	x	B	x
33	Jay Pitts	x	SR	SR

== 2014 squad statistics ==
- Appearances and Points include (Super League, Challenge Cup and Play-offs) as of 13 September 2014.

No	Player	Position	Age	Previous club	Apps	Tries	Goals	DG	Points
1	Brett Kearney	Fullback	30	Cronulla Sharks	22	8	0	0	32
2	Elliot Kear	Wing	25	Crusaders	22	8	0	0	32
3	Adrian Purtell	Centre	29	Penrith Panthers	24	11	0	0	44
4	Matty Blythe	Centre	25	Warrington Wolves	17	1	0	0	4
5	Jamie Foster	Wing	23	St Helens R.F.C.	16	10	50	0	140
7	Luke Gale	Scrum-half	25	Harlequins RL	29	14	44	3	147
8	Nick Scruton	Prop	29	Leeds Rhinos	2	0	0	0	0
9	Matt Diskin	Hooker	32	Leeds Rhinos	17	1	0	0	4
11	Tom Olbison	Second row	23	Bradford Bulls Academy	27	7	0	0	28
12	Dale Ferguson	Second row	26	Huddersfield Giants	7	1	0	0	4
13	Chev Walker	Second row	31	Hull Kingston Rovers	20	1	0	0	4
14	Manase Manuokafoa	Prop	29	Parramatta Eels	27	1	0	0	4
15	Adam Sidlow	Prop	26	Salford City Reds	25	3	0	0	12
16	Danny Addy	Loose forward	23	Bradford Bulls Academy	28	6	0	0	24
17	Lee Gaskell	Stand off	23	St Helens R.F.C.	23	6	0	0	24
18	James Donaldson	Loose forward	22	Bradford Bulls Academy	25	0	0	0	0
19	Adam O'Brien	Hooker	21	Bradford Bulls Academy	29	6	0	0	24
20	Luke George	Wing	26	Huddersfield Giants	12	4	0	0	16
21	Adam Henry	Centre	22	Sydney Roosters	27	6	0	0	24
22	Sam Wood	Centre	20	Bradford Bulls Academy	6	0	0	0	0
23	Oliver Roberts	Second row	18	Bradford Bulls Academy	4	0	0	0	0
24	Alex Mellor	Second row	19	Bradford Bulls Academy	8	0	0	0	0
25	Nathan Conroy	Hooker	19	Bradford Bulls Academy	5	0	0	0	0
26	Liam Sutcliffe	Stand off	19	Leeds Rhinos (Loan)	4	1	0	0	4
27	Greg Burke	Prop	21	Wigan Warriors (Loan)	1	0	0	0	0
28	Danny Bridge	Prop	21	Warrington Wolves (Loan)	8	0	0	0	0
29	Anthony Mullally	Prop	22	Huddersfield Giants (Loan)	6	0	0	0	0
30	Jamal Fakir	Prop	31	Catalans Dragons	16	1	0	0	4
31	Sam Bates	Prop	18	Bradford Bulls Academy	3	0	0	0	0
33	Jay Pitts	Prop	24	Hull F.C. (Loan)	18	3	0	0	12
34	Joe Arundel	Centre	22	Hull F.C. (Loan)	12	5	0	0	20
35	Antonio Kaufusi	Prop	29	Huddersfield Giants (Loan)	4	0	0	0	0
36	Jordan Baldwinson	Loose forward	19	Leeds Rhinos (Loan)	6	0	0	0	0
37	Mason Tonks	Prop	19	Leeds Rhinos (Loan)	0	0	0	0	0
38	Danny Williams	Wing	N/A	Salford Red Devils (Loan)	7	2	0	0	8
39	Brad Adams	Centre	19	Bradford Bulls Academy	2	0	0	0	0
40	Emmerson Whittel	Loose forward	19	Bradford Bulls Academy	1	0	0	0	0

= Injured = Suspended

== 2014 transfers in/out ==
In

	Name	Position	Signed from	Date
(England)	Gareth Carvell	Prop	Warrington Wolves	June 2013
(England)	Dale Ferguson	Second row	Huddersfield Giants	July 2013
(England)	Luke George	Wing	Huddersfield Giants	July 2013
(England)	Matty Blythe	Centre	Warrington Wolves	August 2013
(England)	Lee Gaskell	Stand off	St Helens R.F.C.	August 2013
(New Zealand)	Adam Henry	Centre	Sydney Roosters	October 2013
(Australia)	Frank Winterstein	Prop	Widnes Vikings	October 2013
(England)	Danny Bridge	Prop	Warrington Wolves (Loan)	February 2014
(England)	Anthony Mullally	Prop	Huddersfield Giants (Loan)	February 2014
(England)	Liam Sutcliffe	Stand off	Leeds Rhinos (Loan)	March 2014
(England)	Greg Burke	Prop	Wigan Warriors (Loan)	March 2014
(France)	Jamal Fakir	Prop	Catalans Dragons	April 2014
(England)	Jay Pitts	Second row	Hull F.C. (Loan)	April 2014
(England)	Joe Arundel	Centre	Hull F.C. (Loan)	April 2014
(Tonga)	Antonio Kaufusi	Prop	Huddersfield Giants (Loan)	May 2014
(England)	Jordan Baldwinson	Loose forward	Leeds Rhinos (Loan)	May 2014
(England)	Mason Tonks	Prop	Leeds Rhinos (Loan)	May 2014

Out

	Name	Position	Club Signed	Date
(Cook Islands)	Keith Lulia	Centre	Wests Tigers	September 2013
(England)	Jamie Langley	Loose forward	Hull Kingston Rovers	September 2013
(England)	Michael Platt	Centre	North Wales Crusaders	September 2013
(England)	Curtis Naughton	Fullback	Sydney Roosters	October 2013
(England)	John Bateman	Second row	Wigan Warriors	November 2013
(Australia)	Heath L'Estrange	Hooker	Sydney Roosters	November 2013
(Australia)	Frank Winterstein	Prop	Australia	January 2014
(England)	Gareth Carvell	Prop	Hull F.C.	February 2014
(Malta)	Jarrod Sammut	Stand off	Wakefield Trinity Wildcats	February 2014
(England)	Nick Scruton	Prop	Wakefield Trinity Wildcats	February 2014
