= Sam Bates (rugby league) =

English rugby league footballer

Personal information
- Born: 2 December 1995 (age 29); Halifax, England

Playing information
- Position: Prop
Club
| Years | Team | Pld | T | G | FG | P |
|---|---|---|---|---|---|---|
| 2014–15 | Bradford Bulls | 3 | 0 | 0 | 0 | 0 |
| 2016 | Dewsbury Rams | 1 | 0 | 0 | 0 | 0 |
| | Total | 4 | 0 | 0 | 0 | 0 |
- Source: As of 22 February 2018

Sam Bates (born 2 December 1995) is an English rugby league footballer who played as a prop for the Bradford Bulls and Dewsbury Rams.

== Bradford ==
=== 2014 ===
Bates was named in the Bradford Bulls' team for the first time on 21 April 2014, for the match against Wigan Warriors. He made his professional début in this match, when he came on as a replacement for Jamal Fakir after 18 minutes, but was unable to prevent the Bradford Bulls from succumbing to an 84-6 defeat. He appeared again in the following match against Warrington Wolves. In June 2014, he signed a new two-year contract with Bradford Bulls.

=== 2015 ===
Bates did not feature in any of the pre-season friendlies.

Near the start of the season Bates was released from the club.

== Statistics ==
Statistics do not include pre-season friendlies.

| Season | Appearance | Tries | Goals | D/G | Points |
|---|---|---|---|---|---|
| 2014 Bradford | 2 | 0 | 0 | 0 | 0 |
| 2015 Bradford | 0 | 0 | 0 | 0 | 0 |
| Total | 2 | 0 | 0 | 0 | 0 |
