= Luke Dorn =

Australian rugby league footballer

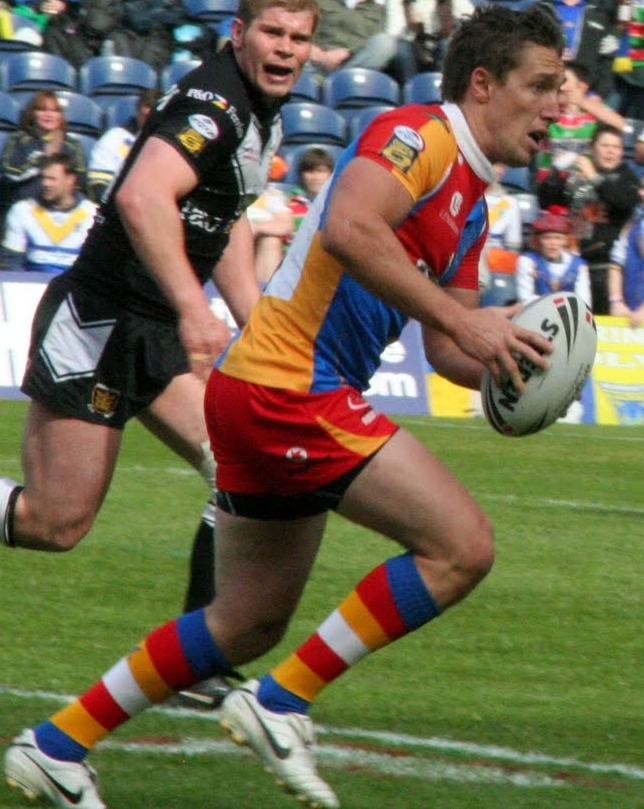

Personal information
- Full name: Luke Dorn
- Born: 2 July 1982 (age 43) Maitland, New South Wales, Australia

Playing information
- Height: 175 cm (5 ft 9 in)
- Weight: 86 kg (13 st 8 lb)
- Position: Fullback, Stand-off, Scrum-half
Club
Years	Team	Pld	T	G	FG	P
2002	Northern Eagles	19	2	0	0	8
2003	Manly Sea Eagles	18	3	0	0	12
2004	Sydney Roosters	1	0	0	0	0
2005–06	London Broncos	58	42	0	0	168
2007	Salford City Reds	29	12	0	0	48
2008	Castleford Tigers	26	19	1	0	78
2009–13	Harlequins RL	108	68	1	0	274
2014–16	Castleford Tigers	59	45	0	0	180
	Total	318	191	2	0	768
Representative
Years	Team	Pld	T	G	FG	P
2004	NSW Residents	1	1	0	0	4

Luke Dorn (born 2 July 1982) is an Australian former professional rugby league footballer who played as a fullback, stand-off and scrum-half in the NRL and the Super League in the 2000s and 2010s.

He played for the Northern Eagles, Manly-Warringah Sea Eagles and the Sydney Roosters in the National Rugby League. He played for the London Broncos, Salford City Reds, Harlequins RL and the Castleford Tigers in two separate spells in the European Super League.

== Background ==
Dorn was born in Maitland, New South Wales, Australia, and played junior rugby league for the East Maitland Griffins and Morpeth Bulls. He represented the Australian Schoolboys team in 2000 whilst attending Maitland All Saints College.

== Playing career ==
Dorn made his first grade debut for the Northern Eagles in round 4 of the 2002 NRL season. He played in the club's final game in round 26 of the same year when they lost to Penrith 68–28. The following year, the Northern Eagles reverted to Manly and Dorn played in their first game back in the competition, a 20–30 loss against North Queensland at Dairy Farmers Stadium.

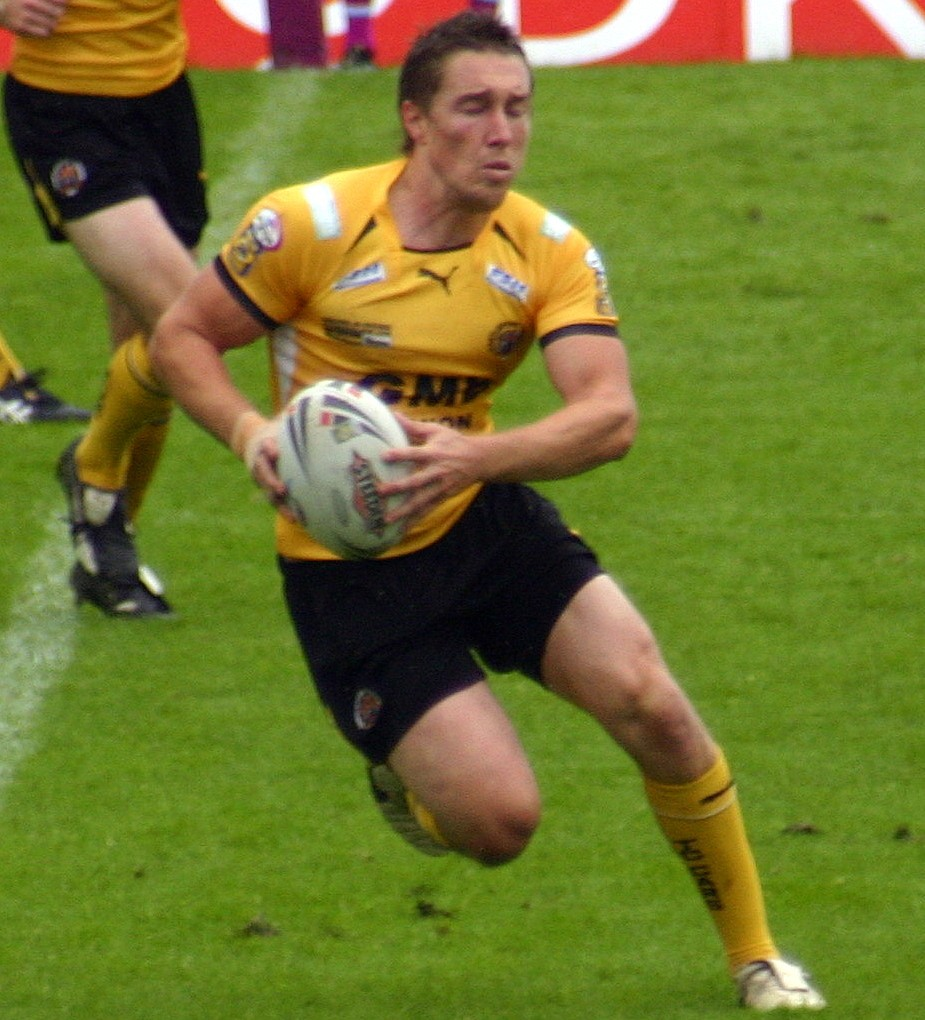
Dorn in action for Castleford

In 2005 he moved to the Super League competition, joining the London Broncos, scoring 23 tries in 28 games in his first season and developing a reputation as a prolific try scorer. In 2007 Dorn moved to the Salford City Reds, but was less successful and the team was relegated at the end of the season. Dorn then joined the Castleford Tigers in 2008, scoring 19 tries in 26 games, before returning to the London Broncos (then known as Harlequins RL) in 2009. In total Dorn played for the London Broncos 160 times in two spells, becoming the club's all-time record try scorer with 104 tries. He scored his 100th try for the Broncos in a spell where he scored eight tries in two back to back games.

At the end of 2013, Dorn signed for the Castleford Tigers for a second time. Castleford coach, Daryl Powell, said of him: "Luke is a player I have admired for a long time, his ability to play at half-back or full-back is massive and his leadership qualities and experience make him a key recruitment for us next season."

He enjoyed a career resurgence in 2014 and appeared in the 2014 Challenge Cup Final defeat by the Leeds Rhinos at Wembley Stadium, his first major final.

The following year, he signed a one-year extension to his contract. He played only 14 times in the 2015 season due to injuries, scoring ten tries. Dorn retired from Super League Rugby at the end of the 2016 season and returned to Australia. He played for Maitland Pickers in 2017, becoming player-coach for the 2018 season before retiring from playing at the end of the year.

== Statistics ==
Year	Team	Matches	Tries	Goals	Field Goals	Points
2002	Northern Eagles	19	2	0	0	8
2003	Manly Sea Eagles	18	3	0	0	12
2004	Sydney Roosters	1	0	0	0	0
2005	London Broncos	31	24	0	0	96
2006	Harlequins RL	27	18	0	0	72
2007	Salford City Reds	29	11	0	0	44
2008	Castleford Tigers	26	19	1	0	76
2009	Harlequins RL	22	13	0	0	52
2010	Harlequins RL	19	18	0	0	72
2011	Harlequins RL	23	15	1	0	62
2012	London Broncos	24	16	0	0	64
2013	London Broncos	20	6	0	0	24
2014	Castleford Tigers	24	19	0	0	76
2015	Castleford Tigers	14	10	0	0	40
2016	Castleford Tigers	21	14	0	0	56
