= Luke Gale =

England international rugby league footballer

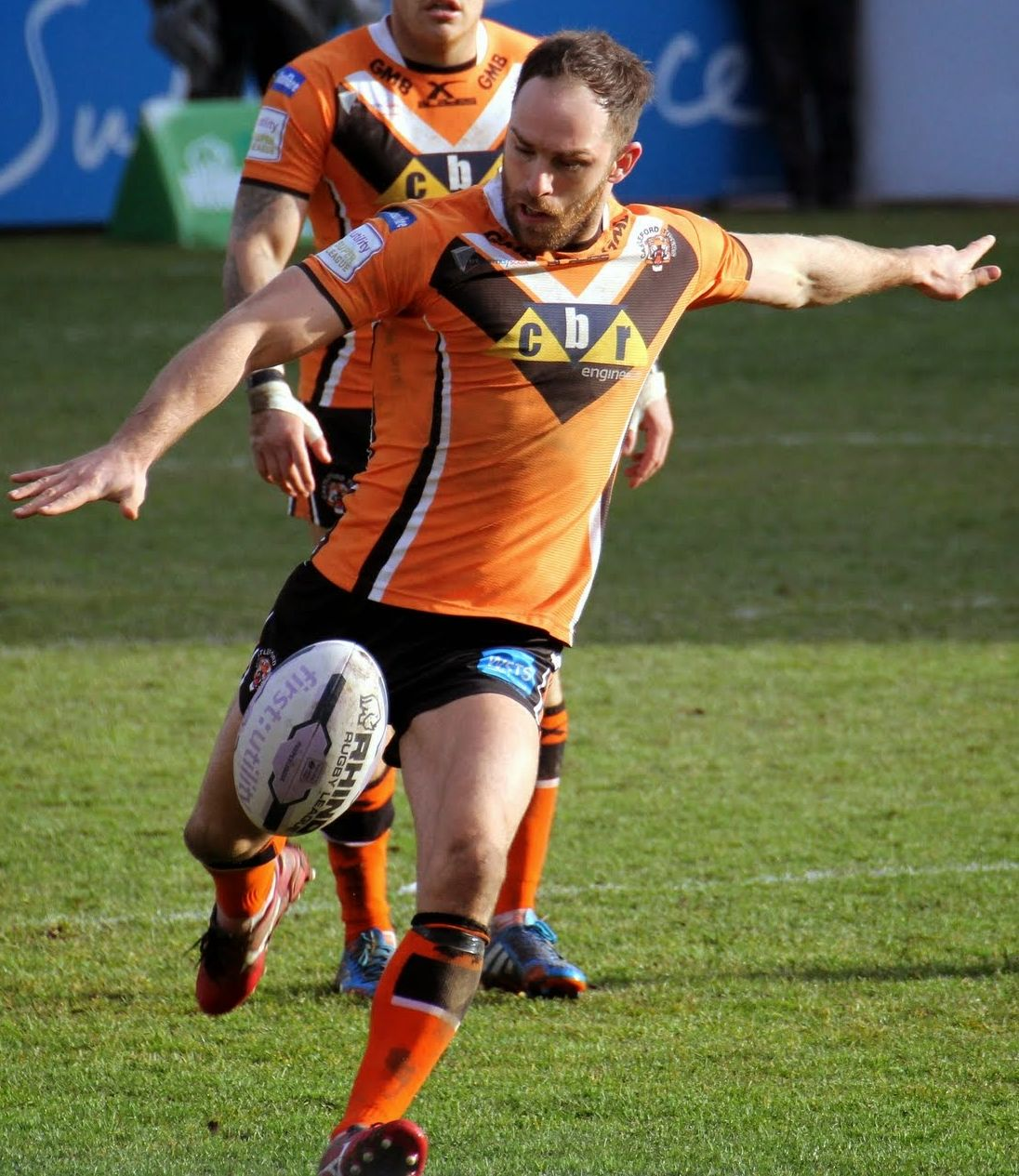

Personal information
- Born: 22 June 1988 (age 38) Leeds, West Yorkshire, England

Playing information
- Height: 5 ft 10 in (1.78 m)
- Weight: 13 st 4 lb (84 kg)
- Position: Scrum-half, Stand-off
Club
Years	Team	Pld	T	G	FG	P
2007(loan)	→ Doncaster	9	3	22	1	57
2008(loan)	→ Doncaster	34	30	52	5	229
2009–11	Harlequins	72	20	95	4	274
2012–14	Bradford Bulls	64	19	119	5	319
2015–19	Castleford Tigers	104	33	415	16	978
2020–21	Leeds Rhinos	29	8	16	5	69
2022	Hull FC	20	2	40	1	89
2023	Keighley Cougars	9	3	7	0	26
2023–24	Wakefield Trinity	35	14	2	1	61
	Total	376	132	768	38	2102
Representative
Years	Team	Pld	T	G	FG	P
2011–12	England Knights	2	2	8	0	24
2016–17	England	9	1	5	0	14

Luke Gale (born 22 June 1988) is a professional rugby league coach who is an assistant coach at Hull Kingston Rovers in the Super League and a former England international professional rugby league footballer who played as scrum-half or stand-off.

Having started his career at Leeds Rhinos, he previously played for Doncaster on loan in the National Leagues, and Harlequins RL, Bradford Bulls, Castleford Tigers and Hull F.C. in the Super League and for Keighley Cougars in the Championship. He played occasionally as a hooker earlier in his career.

== Biography ==
Gale was born in Leeds, Yorkshire, England on 22 June 1988.

On 18 November 2025 it was announced that Gale had joined the coaching staff at Hull Kingston Rovers as an Assistant Coach on a two year deal

== Playing career ==
=== Doncaster RLFC ===
A Leeds academy graduate, Gale was sent out on loan to Doncaster in 2007 and established himself as a first-choice player, winning the National League Two Young Player of the Year award in 2008, in which he became the club's record points scorer in a season.

=== Harlequins RL ===
Gale's form at Doncaster attracted interest from Super League clubs and he moved to London's Harlequins Rugby League team.

=== Bradford Bulls ===
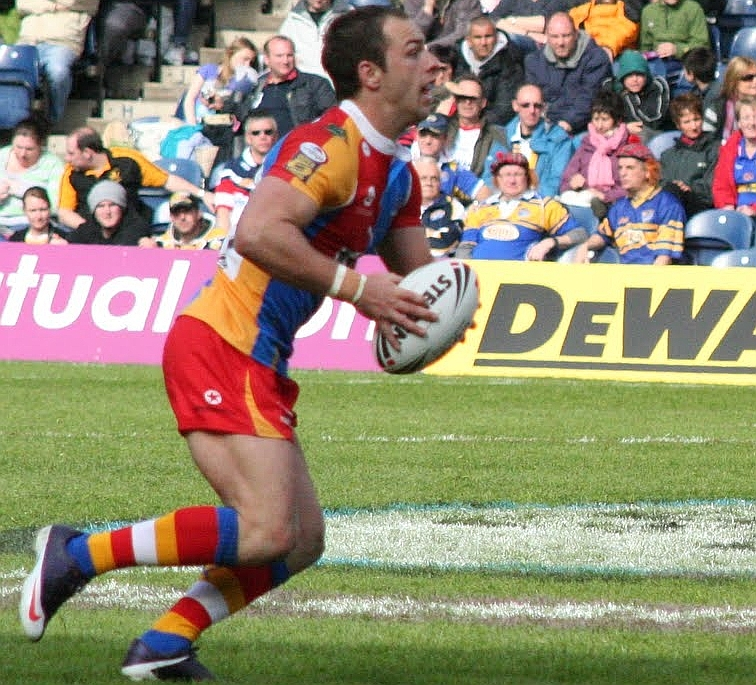
Gale in action for Harlequins in 2010.

Gale spent three years at Harlequins club before signing a two-year contract with Bradford Bulls.

Gale immediately became first-choice scrum-half for Bradford, scoring 143 points for the club in his début season. He signed a three-year extension to his contract at the start of 2013, however he missed the first three months of the season due to injury and only made 16 appearances in total during the year.

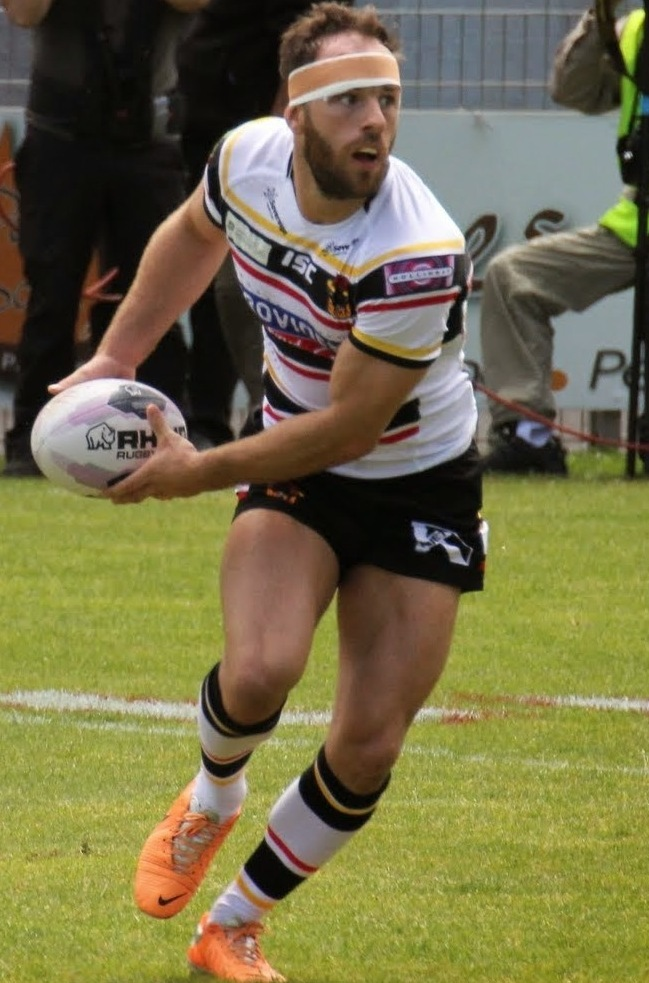
Gale playing for Bradford in 2014

Gale missed only one match for Bradford in 2014, however the team struggled on the field and the club was relegated from Super League at the end of the season, following which Gale left the club.

=== Castleford Tigers ===
Gale joined Castleford in 2015 as a replacement for the departing Marc Sneyd, and scored a try on his début for the club against Wakefield Trinity. Gale enjoyed a productive season, scoring 205 points and becoming an integral part of the team that narrowly missed out on the Super League semi-finals. His form was recognised as he won the Albert Goldthorpe Medal at the end of the season.

Gale was made acting captain for the 2016 season due to injury to Michael Shenton. Another strong season in which he topped the league for try assists saw him retain his Albert Goldthorpe medal.

In 2017, Gale played an integral role in guiding Castleford to the League Leaders' Shield, their first piece of major silverware since 1994, as well as leading the team to their maiden Grand Final appearance, which was lost 24–6 to Leeds Rhinos. Undoubtedly Gale's best performance of the season was in Castleford's 23–22 victory over St Helens in their Betfred Super League semi-final, in which he converted a last-minute penalty to bring the game to golden point extra-time, before scoring the drop-goal which sent Castleford to Old Trafford for the first time in the club's history. Just two weeks beforehand, he had undergone an emergency appendectomy operation. The following week, Gale was named 2017 Steve Prescott MBE Man of Steel for his performances throughout the season, beating team-mate Zak Hardaker and Hull FC’s Albert Kelly to the award. He also won the Albert Goldthorpe Medal for a record-breaking third consecutive year.

In May 2018, Gale suffered a knee injury which kept him sidelined for three months. He then missed the entire 2019 season after rupturing his achilles tendon in training.

=== Leeds Rhinos ===
In October 2019, Gale signed a three-year contract with his hometown club Leeds Rhinos for an undisclosed fee. He captained Leeds in the 2020 Challenge Cup final against Salford Red Devils, with Gale scoring the winning drop-goal in the 76th minute of the game to edge Leeds to a 17–16 victory. In July 2021, Gale was stripped of the captaincy, which he later revealed was due to a disagreement with Leeds coach Richard Agar.

=== Hull F.C. ===
On 5 November 2021 it was announced that he had signed for Hull F.C. in the Super League.

In round 1 of the 2022 Super League season, he made his club debut and scored a try in Hull F.C's 16–12 victory over Wakefield Trinity. The following week, he was sent off for a professional foul in the clubs 38–6 loss against St. Helens R.F.C. On 21 February, Gale was suspended for five matches over the red card against St Helens.

=== Keighley Cougars ===
Gale became a free agent at the end of the 2022 season as his contract with Hull expired. On 19 December 2022 he signed a one-year contract to join Keighley in the Championship for 2023.

Part-way through the 2023 season and after nine appearances for Keighley, Gale left the club to join Wakefield.

=== Wakefield Trinity ===
Gale signed a contract to keep him at Wakefield until the end of the 2024 season. Gale played ten matches for Wakefield Trinity in the Super League XXVIII season as the club finished bottom of the table and were relegated to the RFL Championship which ended their 24-year stay in the top flight. In the 2024 RFL Championship season, Gale played 25 matches as the club won the 1895 Cup, league leaders shield and the RFL Championship grand final.

== International career ==
In 2011 and 2012, Gale played for the England Knights team. He kicked 8 goals, as well as scoring 1 try, in the Knights' 56–4 victory over Ireland in the 2012 European Cup.

After an outstanding 2015 Super League season, Gale was named in the senior England team for their end-of-year internationals against France and New Zealand, but did not make an appearance. He was selected again in England's squad for the 2016 Four Nations, making his international début in a test match against France.

He was selected in the England squad for the 2017 Rugby League World Cup, and subsequently played every game as England made the final in Melbourne, where they lost narrowly to hosts Australia.

== Club statistics ==
Appearances and points in all competitions by year
Club	Season	Tier	App	T	G	DG	Pts
Doncaster	2007	Championship	9	3	22	1	57
Doncaster	2008	League One	34	30	52	5	229
Doncaster	Total		43	33	74	6	286
Harlequins	2009	Super League	21	6	2	0	28
Harlequins	2010	Super League	23	5	9	2	40
Harlequins	2011	Super League	28	9	84	2	206
Harlequins	Total		72	20	95	4	274
Bradford Bulls	2012	Super League	19	2	67	1	143
Bradford Bulls	2013	Super League	16	3	8	1	29
Bradford Bulls	2014	Super League	29	14	44	3	147
Bradford Bulls	Total		64	19	119	5	319
Castleford Tigers	2015	Super League	29	11	102	1	249
Castleford Tigers	2016	Super League	30	7	120	2	270
Castleford Tigers	2017	Super League	30	14	145	9	355
Castleford Tigers	2018	Super League	15	1	48	4	104
Castleford Tigers	2019	Super League	0	0	0	0	0
Castleford Tigers	Total		104	33	415	16	978
Leeds Rhinos	2020	Super League	18	6	13	4	54
Leeds Rhinos	2021	Super League	11	2	3	1	15
Leeds Rhinos	Total		29	8	16	5	69
Hull F.C.	2022	Super League	20	2	40	1	89
Keighley Cougars	2023	Championship	9	3	7	0	26
Wakefield Trinity	2023	Super League	10	1	2	1	9
Wakefield Trinity	2024	Championship	25	13	0	0	52
Wakefield Trinity	Total		35	14	2	1	61
Career total			376	132	768	38	2,102

== Honours ==
=== Castleford ===
- Super League:

Runners up (1): 2017

- Super League League Leaders' Shield:

Winners (1): 2017

=== Leeds ===
- Challenge Cup (1): 2020

=== Wakefield Trinity ===
- RFL 1895 Cup (1): 2024
- RFL Championship Leaders' Shield ((1)): 2024

=== Individual ===
- Albert Goldthorpe Medal: 2015, 2016, 2017
- Man of Steel: 2017
- Ray French Award: 2024
