= Tony Clubb =

England international rugby league footballer

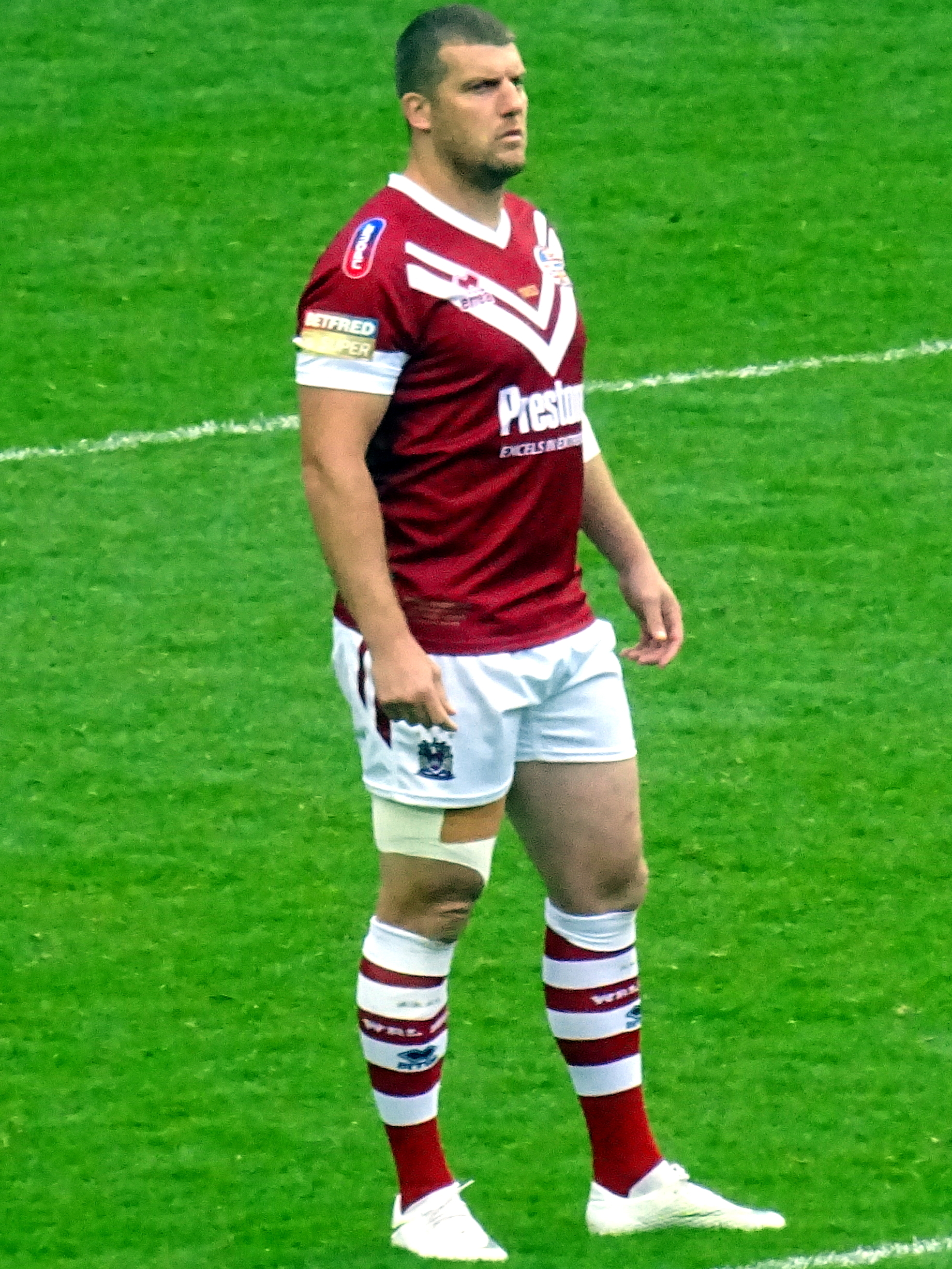

Personal information
- Full name: Anthony Clubb
- Born: 12 June 1987 (age 39) Gravesend, Kent, England

Playing information
- Height: 6 ft 2 in (1.88 m)
- Weight: 17 st 11 lb (113 kg)
- Position: Prop, Loose forward, Second-row, Centre, Wing
Club
| Years | Team | Pld | T | G | FG | P |
|---|---|---|---|---|---|---|
| 2006–13 | London Broncos | 154 | 47 | 0 | 0 | 188 |
| 2008(loan) | → London Skolars | 1 | 0 | 0 | 0 | 0 |
| 2014–21 | Wigan Warriors | 165 | 23 | 0 | 0 | 92 |
| | Total | 320 | 70 | 0 | 0 | 280 |
Representative
| Years | Team | Pld | T | G | FG | P |
| 2008–10 | England | 3 | 5 | 0 | 0 | 20 |

Tony Clubb (born 12 June 1987) is an English professional rugby league coach who is the assistant coach at the Leigh Leopards in the Betfred Super League.

He is a former professional rugby league footballer who played as a prop for the Wigan Warriors in the Super League and has played for England at international level. He played for London under the guises of Harlequins RL and the London Broncos in the Super League.

== Background ==
Clubb was born in Gravesend, Kent, England.

== London Rugby League ==
He is a London Broncos club-trained player having featured in the first team from 2006 until 2013.

Tony Clubb started his rugby career playing for his local team Gravesend at Rugby Union. He switched to Rugby League after London Broncos helped found the Greenwich Admirals in 2001. The Admirals produced several professional players including Louie McCarthy-Scarsbrook, Dave Williams and Michael Worrincy, each of who played for Greenwich, the London Broncos Academy and went on to play in the first team.

By the time Clubb was ready to make his first team début, the London Broncos had been pushed into a kind of merger with Harlequins Rugby Union club and thus the team was called Harlequins RL by the time he played in the away fixture against the Bradford Bulls on 18 February 2006; a game which ended in a draw after the Bulls were awarded a controversial late equalizing penalty opportunity.

Clubb was seen as very much a fill in for the first team and was thus made available for the Harlequins rugby union side in the Middlesex Sevens at Twickenham Stadium. He was, however, unable to play as he was called back for Harlequins RL to replace the unavailable Paul Sykes - who missed most of 2006's Super League XI - in the match against Wigan Warriors.

Clubb was regarded as an outside back in London and featured mainly as a centre with the odd game as a wing. In 2008, England Rugby League was short of quality in the outside backs with the likes of Paul Sykes, Ade Gardner, Mark Calderwood and Martin Gleeson selected for the World Cup.

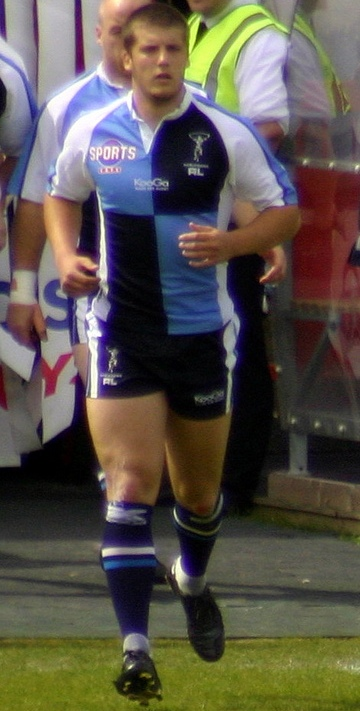
Clubb playing for Harlequins RL

Clubb thus represented England in the backs between 2008 and 2010.

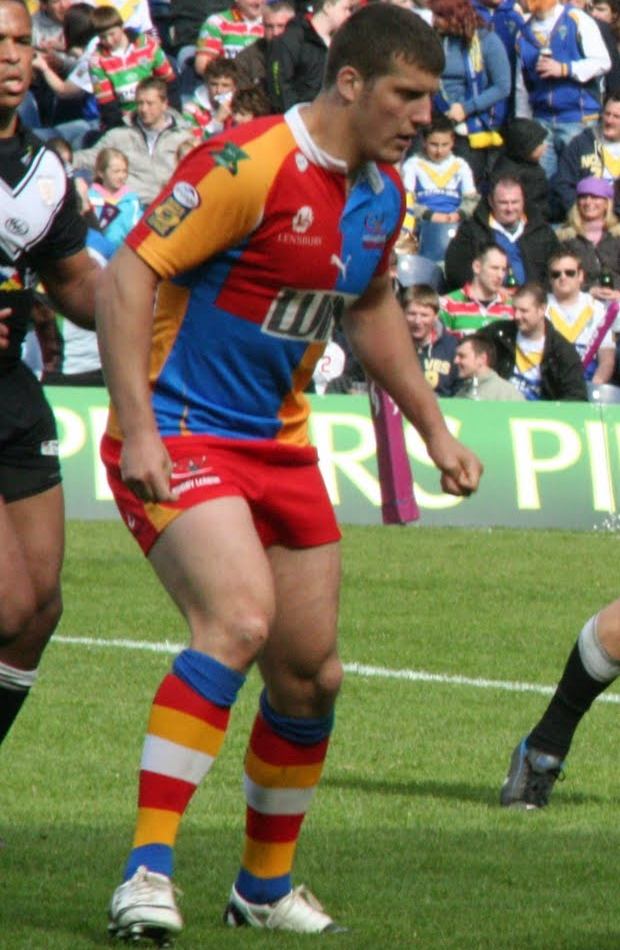
Clubb playing for Harlequins RL

After this, he became arguably a better player as he grew stronger and heavier and he started to play as an interchange forward but with England having much better forwards than backs, his international career was unintentionally ended by this switch.

He went on to play more than 150 games for Harlequins RL and London Broncos in all competitions, eventually becoming the Captain, though for a short period as he was agitating to leave the club as his enthusiasm waned.

In 2013, the team now known as London Broncos had serious financial problems and faced potential liquidation as owner David Hughes wobbled in his support.

The Wigan Warriors took full advantage by exploiting the situation to their fullest advantage. They approached Clubb despite him still having a contract, plus signed the out-of-contract England Knights half-back Dan Sarginson. London Broncos received a nominal fee for two of the best three club trained players they had ever produced and the next season was their last in Super League.

== Wigan Warriors ==
=== 2014 ===
Clubb was a utility player perceived by some Wigan supporters as an outside back due to his international appearances but by the manager as a squad man who could play as a forward. He was on the bench 14 times, made 9 starts and was omitted from the squad for the other games.

By the end of the season, he was mainly used as an interchange prop.

He also scored seven tries including a brace against his former side London Broncos.

He helped Wigan to the Super League Grand Final but was a losing finalist as Wigan lost against St Helens in a game infamous for Ben Flower knocking Lance Hohaia unconscious then continuing to attack him leading to a red card in the 3rd minute of the match.

Ironically his long-term friend Louis McCarthy-Scarsbrook was on the winning side.

=== 2015 ===
Clubb was moved permanently to the front row at the start of the new Super League season after expressing his desire to play at prop. Clubb made 26 appearances scoring tries against Wakefield Trinity and Warrington Wolves. In late May he signed a new deal just 18 months into his original 4-year contract due to his impressive performances and also the fact that his original deal did not really reflect his ability.

Clubb made his second appearance at Old Trafford in the Super League Grand Final and again did not win the Grand Final, losing out to the Leeds Rhinos 22–20 at Old Trafford.

=== 2016 ===
Clubb started the season impressively making 15 appearances and scoring one try before an illegal crusher tackle against Hull FC saw him requiring surgery. Due to the crusher tackle he did not play for another nine months meaning he was not part of the squad that won the 2016 Super League Grand Final against Warrington, thus he had still not been on the winning side at Old Trafford despite Wigan's three visits in three years.

=== 2017 ===
After nine months out he made his comeback against Salford Red Devils in Round 1 of Super League. He played an important role against Cronulla-Sutherland Sharks helping Wigan to win the World Club Challenge for a record-breaking fourth time. His early season form was not overly impressive and after he withdrew early against Castleford Tigers it was announced that he was to have surgery to remove a kidney which had been troubling him. Incredibly just two months later he made his comeback against Widnes Vikings helping Wigan to a 28–12 victory.

He played an important role in the narrow Challenge Cup final loss, his controversially disallowed try the reason Hull FC claimed the trophy. Hull coach Lee Radford said after the game "I honestly thought that was a try for Tony Clubb". After the ball was stolen from Clubb he grounded the ball however the video referee deemed he had lost control of the ball, therefore, had knocked on.

The controversy increased a week later when St Helens were awarded a similar try against Wigan in the Super League. In total Clubb played 22 times scoring one try for a feeble Wigan team that finished in the bottom half of the table.

=== 2018 ===
In the 2018 season, Wigan Warriors released eight players including stars like McIlorum and Gelling but made only two signings. This saw many players handed a lower number than before and Clubb was handed the number 8 shirt after Wigan released Frank-Paul Nu'uausala. This was the first time since his days at London Broncos that Clubb was given a number that suggested he was in the starting line-up.

He played in the 2018 Super League Grand Final victory over the Warrington Wolves at Old Trafford.

=== 2019 ===
Clubb played 23 games for games for Wigan in 2019 including their shock semi-final loss against Salford.

=== 2020 ===
Clubb played in the 2020 Super League Grand Final which Wigan lost 8–4 against St Helens.

=== 2021 ===
In round 5 of the 2021 Super League season, Clubb was placed on report for an alleged racist remark towards Hull FC player Andre Savelio. He was subsequently suspended from playing by Wigan until the investigation was concluded.

On 4 May, Clubb was suspended for eight matches and handed a £500 fine for his on-field comments towards Savelio. It was alleged by Savelio that Clubb had called him a "stupid Polynesian c***". At the hearing, Clubb claimed he said to Savelio “You silly c***, you’re from Warrington. You’re not Polynesian you c***". Clubb announced he would retire at the end of the 2021 super league season on 22 September 2021.

== International honours ==
Clubb has previously been selected in the England training squad for the 2008 Rugby League World Cup.

He was selected for the team to face Wales at the Keepmoat Stadium prior to England's departure for the 2008 Rugby League World Cup.

He made his England début in the victory over Wales on 10 October 2008.

On 6 November 2010 he became the tenth ever England rugby league player to score 4 tries in an international fixture. This was achieved in England's 36–10 win over Papua New Guinea in their last match of the 2010 Four Nations tournament.

== Honours ==
Clubb has, as of 2021, played for Wigan for eight seasons, securing two major honours.

He won one League Leader's Shield in 2020 and the Grand Final in 2018.

He has missed out on five more honours, losing in the Grand Final in 2014, 2015, and 2020, and the Challenge Cup Final in 2017 plus missing one successful final due to injury.

== Career statistics ==
| Club | Season | Appearances | Tries | Points |
|---|---|---|---|---|
| London Broncos | 2006 | 8 | 1 | 4 |
| London Broncos | 2007 | 6 | 1 | 4 |
| London Broncos | 2008 | 22 | 8 | 32 |
| London Broncos | 2009 | 24 | 6 | 24 |
| London Broncos | 2010 | 28 | 7 | 28 |
| London Broncos | 2011 | 29 | 13 | 52 |
| London Broncos | 2012 | 26 | 6 | 24 |
| London Broncos | 2013 | 9 | 1 | 4 |
| London Broncos | Total | 149 | 43 | 172 |
| Wigan Warriors | 2014 | 23 | 7 | 28 |
| Wigan Warriors | 2015 | 26 | 2 | 8 |
| Wigan Warriors | 2016 | 15 | 1 | 4 |
| Wigan Warriors | 2017 | 22 | 1 | 4 |
| Wigan Warriors | Total | 86 | 11 | 44 |
| Total | | 199 | 44 | 176 |
