= Greg Burke (rugby league) =

English rugby league footballer (born 1993)

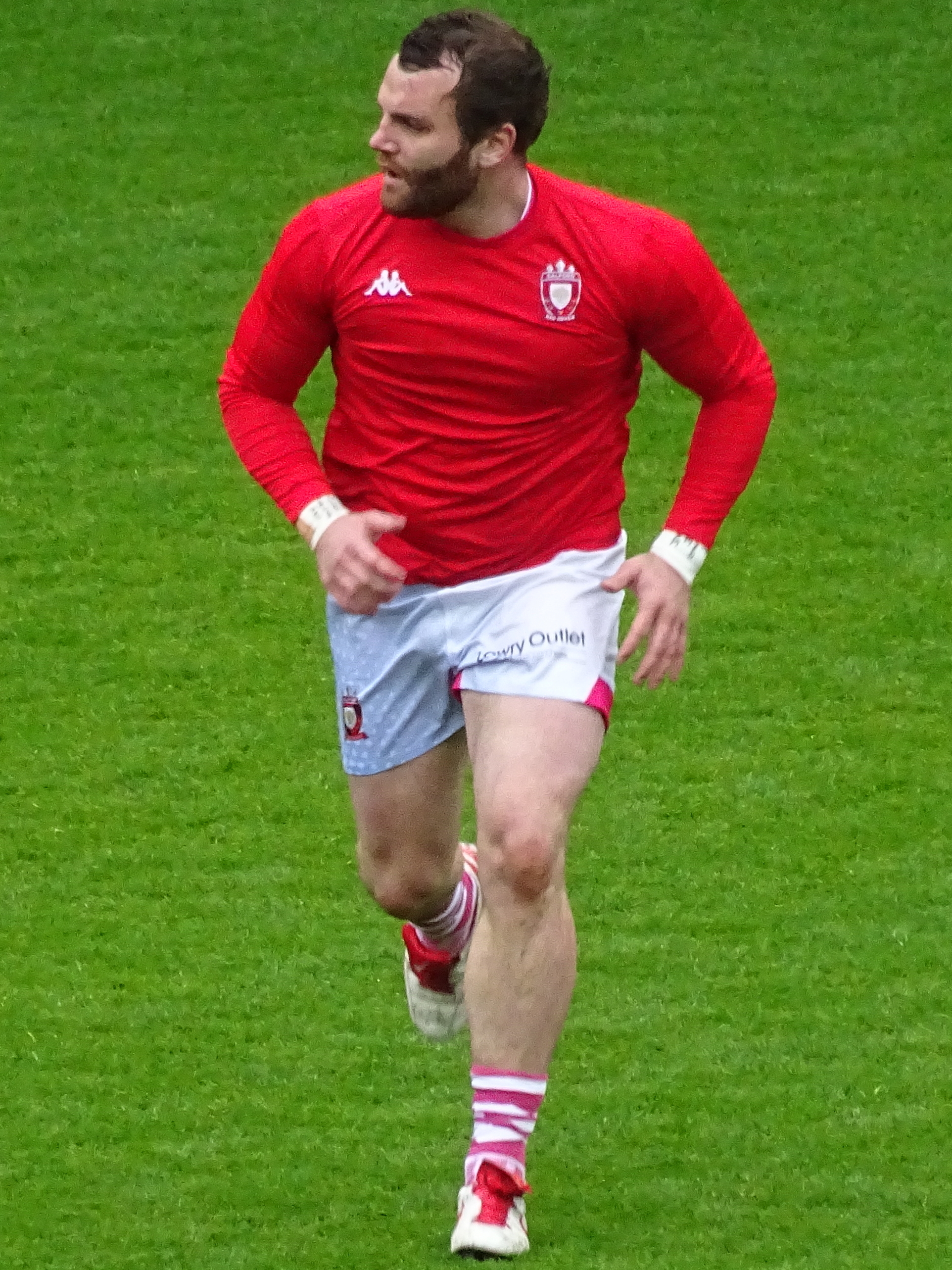

Personal information
- Full name: Gregory Burke
- Born: 12 February 1993 (age 33) Wigan, Greater Manchester, England
- Height: 6 ft 1 in (1.85 m)
- Weight: 17 st 5 lb (110 kg)

Playing information
- Position: Prop, Loose forward
Club
Years	Team	Pld	T	G	FG	P
2013–16	Wigan Warriors	42	1	0	0	4
2014(loan)	→ Bradford Bulls	1	0	0	0	0
2014(loan)	→ Workington Town	11	1	0	0	4
2015(loan)	→ Hull Kingston Rovers	21	0	0	0	0
2016–18	Widnes Vikings	39	2	0	0	8
2018(loan)	→ Salford Red Devils	11	2	0	0	8
2019–22	Salford Red Devils	56	1	0	0	4
2022(loan)	→ Barrow Raiders	1	1	0	0	4
2023–24	Barrow Raiders	36	2	0	0	0
	Total	218	10	0	0	32
- Source: As of 4 November 2024

Greg Burke (born 12 February 1993) is a retired English professional rugby league footballer.

He played for the Wigan Warriors in the Super League, and on loan from Wigan at the Bradford Bulls and Hull Kingston Rovers in the Super League and Workington Town in the Championship. Burke played for the Widnes Vikings in the top flight, and on loan from Widnes at Salford, before joining the Red Devils permanently in 2019. He retired ahead of the 2025 season, having played 250 career games.

== Background ==
Burke was born in Wigan, Greater Manchester, England.

== Wigan Warriors ==
He featured in 17 games in 2013 scoring one try against Catalans Dragons. He missed out on the play-off games and the Grand Final. During 2014 he was not selected for the 2014 World Club Challenge but he did play 6 league games. Burke returned to Wigan for the 2016 season and featured in 19 games for the Warriors, before departing to join Widnes in the summer.

== Loan to Bradford Bulls ==
Burke signed on a one-month loan deal at the Bradford Bulls in 2014. He featured in Round 4 (Hull F.C.) in which he sustained a dislocated shoulder.

== Loan to Hull KR ==
In November 2014, Burke signed for Hull Kingston Rovers on loan for the 2015 season, making 21 appearances throughout the season.

== Salford ==
He played in the 2019 Super League Grand Final defeat by St Helens at Old Trafford.

On 17 October 2020, he played in the 2020 Challenge Cup Final defeat for Salford against Leeds at Wembley Stadium.
