= Jason Golden =

Ireland international rugby league footballer

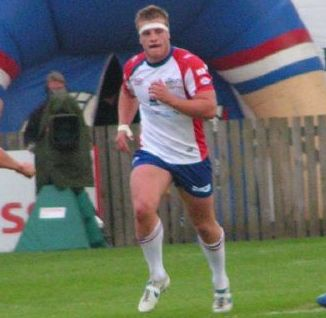

Personal information
- Full name: Jason Golden
- Born: 6 November 1985 (age 40) Rothwell, West Yorkshire, England

Playing information
- Height: 6 ft 0 in (1.83 m)
- Weight: 15 st 4 lb (97 kg)
- Position: Second-row, Loose forward
Club
Years	Team	Pld	T	G	FG	P
2006	York City Knights	22	5	0	0	20
2007–08	Wakefield Trinity Wildcats	38	3	0	0	4
2009–12	London Broncos	55	4	0	0	16
2013–14	York City Knights	8	0	0	0	0
	Total	123	12	0	0	40
Representative
Years	Team	Pld	T	G	FG	P
2009	Ireland	1	0	0	0	0

Jason Golden (born 6 November 1985), also known by the nicknames of "Fleecey", "Golds", "The Golden Child" and "Tackle machine", is an English former professional rugby league footballer.

== Background ==
Golden was born in Rothwell, Leeds, West Yorkshire.

He was a product of the Leeds Rhinos academy, previously a junior for Oulton Raiders and Hunslet Parkside.

== Career ==
Whilst part of the Leeds academy he has helped them on their way to winning the 2003 Grand Final, scoring a hat-trick. He was a prominent fixture in the senior academy side before been moved out on loan to York City Knights, where he made 22 appearances and scored five tries, and was selected in the 2006 National League One All Star team and named players' player 2006.

He made his Super League début in 2007 for Wakefield Trinity Wildcats following a pre-season move to the club, he spent 2 years with the Yorkshire side. Golden became a regular in the squad appearing 31 times. Golden joined London-based rugby league club Harlequins at the beginning of the 2009 season as part of coach Brian McDermott refresh of the team. He became an integral part of the London outfit until injury curtailed. Jason Golden returned to York, following his release from London, and was made club captain. Unfortunately, Golden's career was cut short due to a recurring pelvic injury.

== Representative ==
Selected for the under-18 Great Britain Academy team which beat Australia for the first time. Also played for England at under-18 level. He was also a constant fixture in the junior representative teams.

He has been named in the Ireland training squad for the 2008 Rugby League World Cup.
