= Ben Jones (English rugby league) =

English rugby league footballer

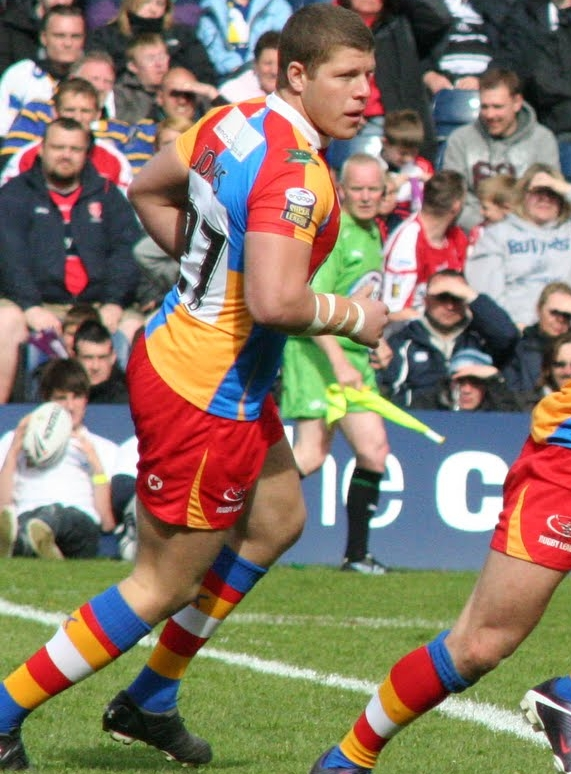

Personal information
- Full name: Ben Jones
- Born: 18 October 1988 (age 37) Beeston, Leeds, West Yorkshire, England
- Height: 6 ft 0 in (1.83 m)
- Weight: 16 st 3 lb (103 kg)

Playing information
- Position: Prop
Club
Years	Team	Pld	T	G	FG	P
2010	Harlequins RL	3	0	0	0	0
2010(DR)	→ London Skolars	3	0	0	0	0
2010(loan)	→ Doncaster	6	1	0	0	4
2011	York City Knights	11	1	0	0	4
2012–13	Dewsbury Rams	31	2	0	0	8
2014	Sheffield Eagles	3	0	0	0	0
	Total	57	4	0	0	16
- Source: As of 18 October 2014

Ben Jones (born 18 October 1988) is an English former professional rugby league footballer. He played as a prop.

== Background ==
Jones was born in Beeston, Leeds, West Yorkshire, England.

== Career ==
Jones played junior rugby league for his local amateur club Hunslet Parkside and previously played in the youth teams at Castleford and Leeds.

He joined Super League club Harlequins RL ahead of the 2010 season during which he was dual-registered at London Skolars and had a loan spell and Doncaster.

In November 2010, Jones signed for York City Knights in the Championship. He then spent the 2012 and 2013 seasons with Dewsbury Rams before signing with Sheffield Eagles for the 2014 season.
