= Martyn Smith (rugby league) =

English rugby league & Australian Rules international footballer

Personal information
- Born: 27 February 1992 (age 34) Mitcham, London, England

Playing information
- Position: Hooker, Scrum-half
Club
Years	Team	Pld	T	G	FG	P
2010	Harlequins RL	2	0	0	0	0
2014	London Skolars	1	2	0	0	8
	RC Lescure-Arthes XIII	0	0	0	0	0
	Total	3	2	0	0	8
- Source: As of 15 February 2012

Martyn Smith (born 27 February 1992) is an English professional rugby league footballer who plays for RC Lescure-Arthes XIII in the Elite Two Championship, as a scrum-half or hooker.

== Background ==
Martyn Smith was born in Mitcham, London, England.

== Playing career ==
Smith made his first grade début in the Super League, aged just 17 for the Harlequins RL against Hull F.C. on 26 February 2010.

He has represented England in Australian Rules Football.
