= Jamal Fakir =

France & Morocco international rugby league footballer & coach (born 1982)

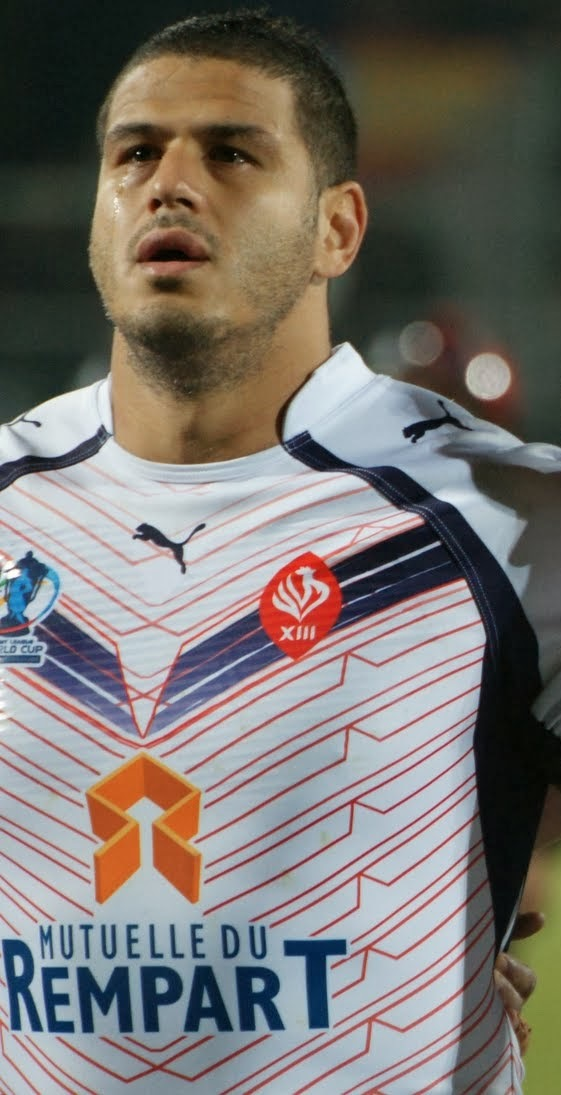

Personal information
- Born: 30 August 1982 (age 44) Fes, Morocco

Playing information
- Height: 1.81 m (5 ft 11 in)
- Weight: 115 kg (18 st 2 lb)
- Position: Prop, Second-row
Club
Years	Team	Pld	T	G	FG	P
2001–03	Villeneuve Leopards	3+
2006–14	Catalans Dragons	144	12	0	0	48
2014	Bradford Bulls	16	1	0	0	4
2015–19	Lézignan Sangliers	61	5	0	0	20
2019–20	Palau Broncos	0	0	0	0	0
	Total	224	18	0	0	72
Representative
Years	Team	Pld	T	G	FG	P
2004–14	France	30	4	0	0	16
2009	Morocco	2	2	0	0	8

Coaching information
Club
Years	Team	Gms	W	D	L	W%
2020–	RC Baho XIII	0	0	0	0

Jamal Fakir (born 30 August 1982) is a Moroccan rugby league footballer who plays as a prop or second-row for the Lézignan Sangliers club in the Elite One Championship.

== Background ==
Fakir was born in Fez, Morocco. He is Moroccan-French.

== Career ==
Fakir caught the attention of Super League and French rugby union sides before the Dragons' entry into Super League in 2006. After a strong debut season in Super League, Fakir's progress has been hampered by two serious knee injuries, firstly a ruptured patella tendon sustained in late 2006, and then cruciate ligament damage sustained in May 2007 which ended his season.

Fakir was named in the France training squad for the 2008 Rugby League World Cup. He was named in the France squad for the 2008 Rugby League World Cup.

Fakir became a Moroccan international in 2009.

He agreed to switch codes in May 2010 to play rugby union, and intended to join Castres Olympique on a one-year deal at the beginning of the 2010/2011 season. In addition to his deal with Castres he also had interest from Scottish club Glasgow Warriors. Fakir however reversed his decision and decided to stay with the Catalans for a further three seasons.

Capped for France against New Zealand in the 2013 Rugby League World Cup group play round 2, coming off the bench to make an impact in the loss.

On 3 April 2014, Fakir signed for Super League team Bradford Bulls.

He played in the 2014 European Cup.
