= Luke May =

English rugby league footballer (born 1989)

Personal information
- Full name: Luke May
- Born: 23 August 1989 (age 37) Ashford, Surrey, England
- Height: 5 ft 10 in (1.78 m)
- Weight: 13 st 5 lb (85 kg)

Playing information
- Position: Centre
Club
Years	Team	Pld	T	G	FG	P
2009–10	Harlequins RL	4	0	0	0	0
2009(loan)	→ Doncaster	6	3	0	0	12
2010(loan)	→ London Skolars	10	2	0	0	8
2011	London Skolars	7	2	0	0	8
	Total	27	7	0	0	28
- Source: As of 3 February 2018

Luke May (born 23 August 1989), also known by the nickname of "The Force" (May the Force be with you"), is an English rugby league footballer who last played for the London Skolars in Co-operative Championship One, as a centre.

== Background ==
May was born in Ashford, Surrey, England.

== Career ==
He previously played in the Super League with the Harlequins RL.
