= Ben Kaye =

English rugby league footballer

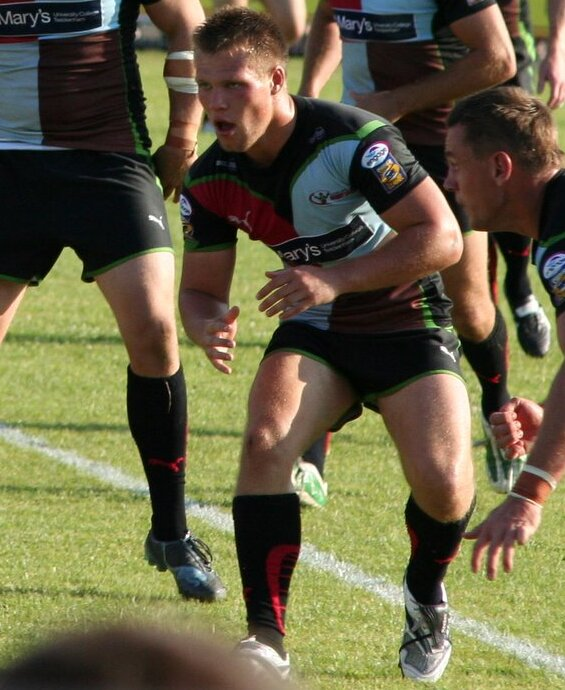

Personal information
- Full name: Ben David Kaye
- Born: 19 December 1988 (age 37) Morley, West Yorkshire, England
- Height: 5 ft 11 in (1.80 m)
- Weight: 14 st 5 lb (91 kg)

Playing information
- Position: Hooker
Club
Years	Team	Pld	T	G	FG	P
2008	Leeds Rhinos	4	1	0	0	4
2009–10	Harlequins RL	15	0	0	0	0
2010–13	Featherstone Rovers	96	8	0	0	32
2014–19	Halifax	126	15	0	0	60
2021–22	Batley Bulldogs	18	1	0	0	4
	Total	259	25	0	0	100

Coaching information
Club
Years	Team	Gms	W	D	L	W%
2025	Batley Bulldogs	1	0	0	1	0
- Source: As of 26 June 2025

Ben Kaye (born 19 December 1988) is an English rugby league footballer who last played as a hooker for the Batley Bulldogs in the Championship.

He played for the Leeds Rhinos and Harlequins RL in the Super League, and for Featherstone Rovers and Halifax in the Championship.

== Background ==
Kaye was born in Morley, West Yorkshire, England. Kaye played junior rugby league for Churwell Chiefs ARLFC and played for England at under-16 level.

== Career ==
=== Playing career ===
He made a try scoring début against Harlequins RL in March 2008 when playing for Leeds. After a spell in London with Harlequins RL Kaye headed back north to join Championship club Featherstone Rovers. On 18 August 2020 it was reported that Kaye would join Batley for the 2021 season.

=== Coaching ===
When assistant coach, he took over as joint interim head coach, with Jaymes Chapman, at Batley Bulldogs for one match in June 2025, following the departure of Mark Moxon, and prior to the appointment of John Kear.
