= Will Sharp =

Nigerian rugby league footballer

Will "Sharpy" Sharp
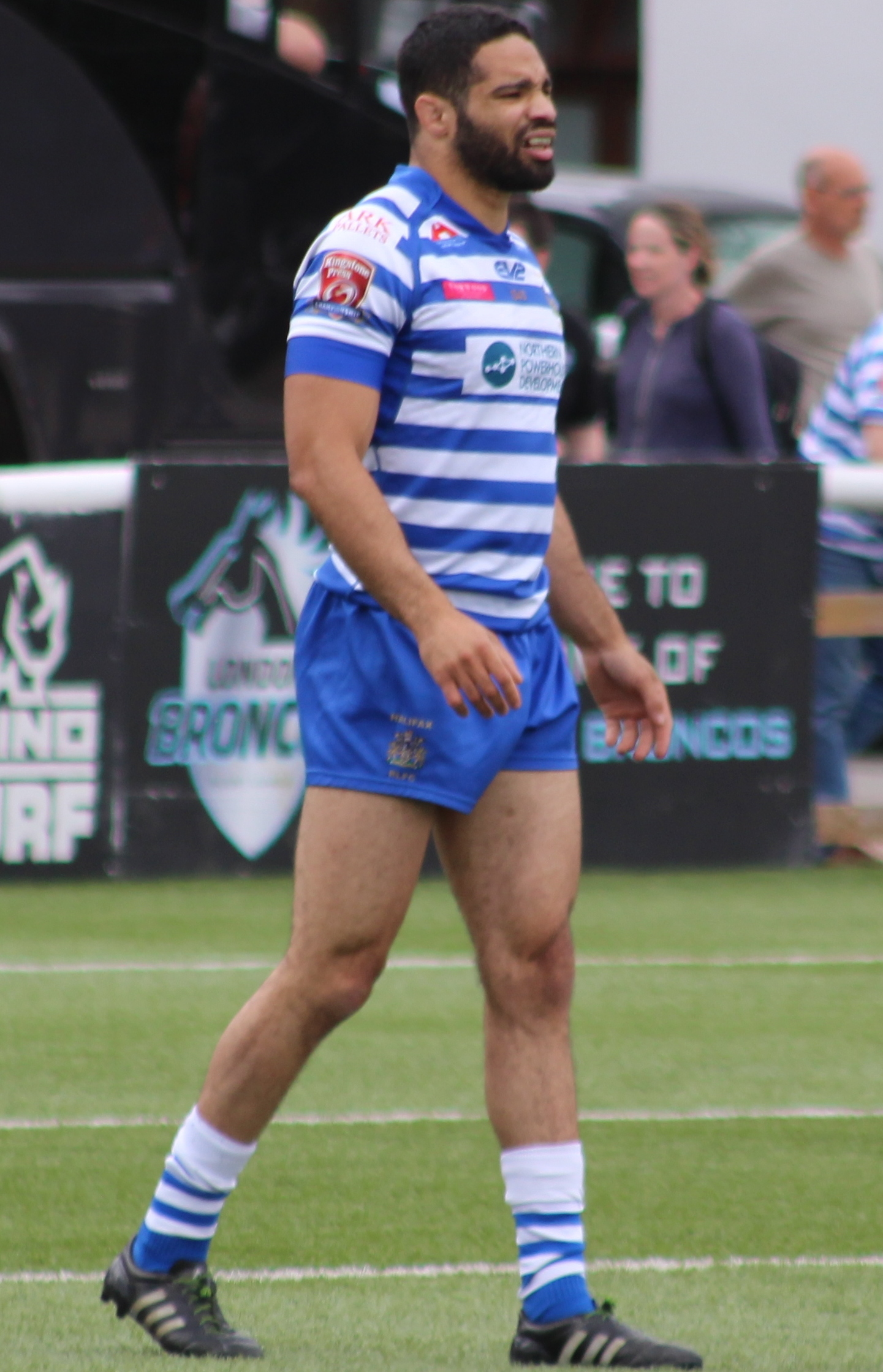

Personal information
- Full name: William Sharp
- Born: 13 May 1986 (age 40) Zaria, Nigeria

Playing information
- Height: 5 ft 11 in (181 cm)
- Weight: 14 st 5 lb (91 kg)
- Position: Wing, Fullback, Centre
Club
Years	Team	Pld	T	G	FG	P
2008–10	Harlequins RL	70	19	0	0	76
2011–12	Hull F.C.	39	12	0	0	48
2013–15	Featherstone Rovers	81	60	1	0	242
2016–19	Halifax	41	10	0	0	40
2020	York City Knights	4	2	0	0	8
	Total	235	103	1	0	414
Representative
Years	Team	Pld	T	G	FG	P
2010–11	Cumbria	2	0	1	0	2

William Sharp (born 13 May 1986) is a Nigerian rugby league footballer who played as a centre, fullback or on the wing for the York City Knights in the Championship.

He has previously played for Harlequins RL and Hull F.C. in the Super League, and Featherstone Rovers and Halifax in the Championship.

== Background ==
Sharp was born in Zaria, Nigeria.

== Early career ==
He originally signed for London Broncos from South London Storm RLFC. He also played rugby union for Streatham-Croydon RFC.

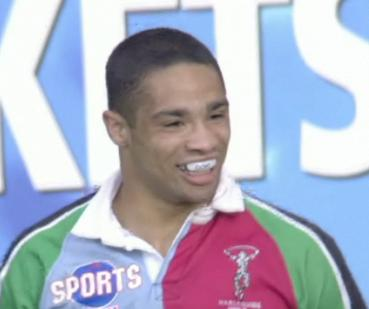
Sharp celebrating after scoring against Leeds

== Quins RL (now London Broncos) ==
Sharp had a contract with Harlequins RL that saw the dynamic youngster join the first grade squad on a permanent basis.

Will Sharp was named as the Harlequins Senior Academy Player of the Year in 2007.

== Hull FC ==
On 11 August 2010 it was announced that Will has signed a 2-year contract with Super League side Hull F.C. Upon signing Sharp was quoted as saying "I didn't want the opportunity to pass and wonder what if and I really want to test myself at Hull. When a club like Hull comes along with the potential to be a top three team it is hard to ignore."

Hull coach Richard Agar went on to say. "He is a talented, young and ambitious player. We're pleased he thinks Hull is the place to realise those ambitions. He has the ability to carry the ball well and has strength and speed which will be great assets for us next season and I don't think it will be long before he establishes himself as a crowd favourite at the KC Stadium." However, Agar dropped Sharp for the last game.

Under new Hull coach Peter Gentle, Sharp has looked much more confident when taking the ball forward and his defence has improved. Having Tony Martin, an experienced Super League and NRL player as his inside centre will no doubt help with his defence.

== Featherstone Rovers ==
In April 2013 Will signed for ambitious Championship club Featherstone Rovers. He signed a 6-month deal in an effort to earn a longer contract. The then Rovers' coach Daryl Powell compared him to rugby league and rugby union footballer Jason Robinson. Sharp appeared to make an immediate impact with the fans due to his fearless and committed style of play. This earned him the nickname 'Sugar Ray'. On 2 September 2015, Sharpe was the player who scored the winning try for Featherstone against Batley. Featherstone were losing the game 26-22 when the siren sounded in the background. Batley player Shaun Ainscough then attempted to kick the ball out of the field of play but the ball did not find touch. Sharpe then pounced on the loose ball to score a try which tied the game 26-26. Featherstone player Paul Sykes would then kick a goal from the side line to win the game 28–26.

== Halifax ==
Sharp joined Halifax ahead of the 2016 season.

He joined the club after being suggested by one time Featherstone Rovers' coach Peter Roe.

== Representative ==
Sharp represented Cumbria in 2010.

In 2012 Will Sharp made his international début for the Nigerian national 7s team at the African Regional qualifiers in Morocco.
