= Dave Williams (rugby league, born 1987) =

English rugby league footballer

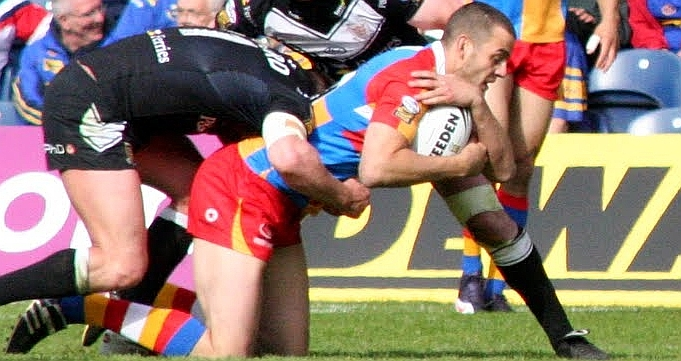

Personal information
- Full name: David Williams
- Born: 29 January 1987 (age 39) London, England
- Height: 6 ft 7 in (2.01 m)
- Weight: 16 st 1 lb (102 kg) or 17 st 9 lb (112 kg)

Playing information
- Position: Prop
Club
Years	Team	Pld	T	G	FG	P
2008–11	Harlequins RL	29	0	0	0	0
2010(loan)	→ Keighley Cougars	2	0	0	0	0
2011(loan)	→ Featherstone Rovers	5	0	0	0	0
2010–17	London Skolars	104	17	0	0	68
2015(loan)	→ London Broncos	4	0	0	0	0
	Total	144	17	0	0	68
- Source: As of 6 April 2016

Dave Williams (born 29 January 1987) is an English former rugby league footballer who played for London Skolars in League 1, as a prop. He was also the captain of London Skolars.

== Background ==
David Williams was born in London, England on 29 January 1987.. He attended sixth form at Charlton Athletic FC as part of the London Broncos academy.

== Career ==
His first job was being a rugby player in 2008 working for the London broncos but then in around 2016, when him and Rachel Emily Williams had two kids, Chloe and Adam, he stopped rugby and became an electrician. He signed a new 2-year deal to start from the 2009 season.
