= Brian McDermott (rugby league) =

English rugby league footballer and coach

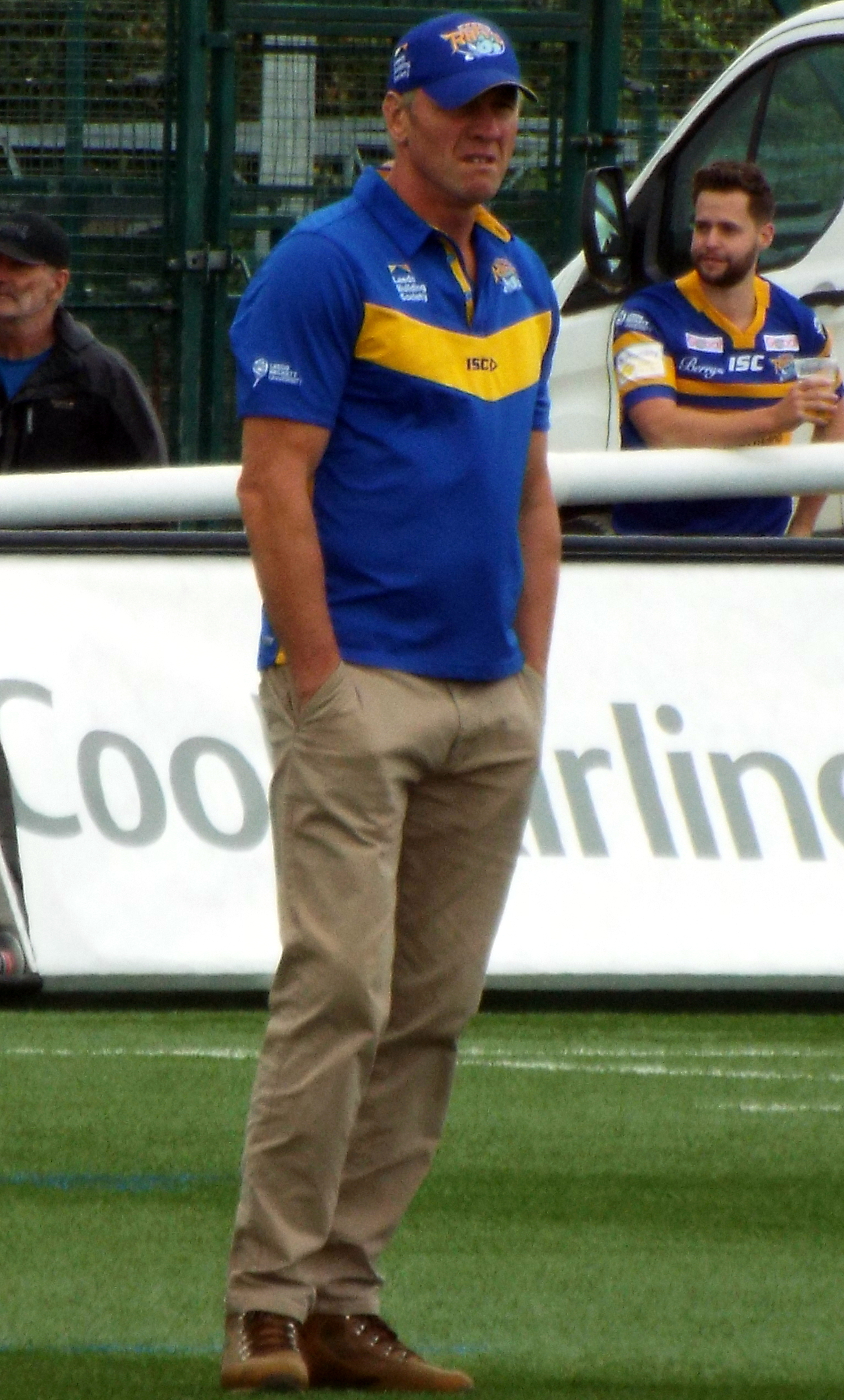

Personal information
- Full name: Brian Gerrad McDermott
- Born: 16 March 1970 (age 56) Wakefield, West Riding of Yorkshire, England

Playing information
- Position: Prop
Club
Years	Team	Pld	T	G	FG	P
1994–02	Bradford Bulls	250	42	0	0	168
Representative
Years	Team	Pld	T	G	FG	P
1996–98	Great Britain	4	0	0	0	0
2001	England	1	0	0	0	0
2001	Yorkshire	1	0	0	0	0

Coaching information
Club
Years	Team	Gms	W	D	L	W%
2006–10	Harlequins RL	115	42	3	70	37
2011–18	Leeds Rhinos	265	162	6	97	61
2019–20	Toronto Wolfpack	36	29	0	7	81
2021–22	Featherstone Rovers	33	26	1	6	79
	Total	449	259	10	180	58
Representative
Years	Team	Gms	W	D	L	W%
2015–18	United States	3	2	0	1	67
2026–	England	3	2	0	1	67
- Source: As of 21 November 2026

Brian G. McDermott (born 16 March 1970) is an English professional rugby league coach who is the head coach of England at international level, and an assistant coach at the Gold Coast Titans in the NRL. A former professional rugby league footballer, he won three Super League Grand Finals as a Bradford Bulls player and has won four Grand Finals as head coach of Leeds Rhinos.

He was previously the head coach of Leeds in the Super League and of the USA national team. Nicknamed 'Big Mac', McDermott was a Great Britain international forward who played his entire career at club level for Bradford, winning Super League Grand Finals and Challenge Cups with them.

He began his coaching career in 2003 as an assistant at Huddersfield, taking his first senior coaching role with Harlequins RL in 2006, before joining Leeds as head coach in 2010. McDermott coached Leeds to several major trophies including the 2011, 2012, 2015 and 2017 Super League titles, the 2012 World Club Challenge, and the 2014 and 2015 Challenge Cups.

== Background ==
McDermott was born in Wakefield, West Riding of Yorkshire, England. He played amateur rugby league as a junior for Eastmoor RLFC and was a Royal Marine for five years before becoming a professional player.

== Playing career ==
=== 1990s ===
McDermott joined Bradford Northern (later Bradford Bulls) in 1994, where he stayed for 10 years. He played for Bradford at prop forward in their 1996 Challenge Cup final loss to St. Helens. He played for Bradford Bulls from the interchange bench in the 1999 Super League Grand Final which was lost to St Helens.

McDermott won a cap for England in 2001 against Wales, and won caps for Great Britain in 1996 against Fiji, and 3 in 1997 against Australia (Super League).

=== 2000s ===
McDermott played for the Bradford Bulls at prop in their 2001 Super League Grand Final victory against the Wigan Warriors. As Super League VI champions, the Bradford Bulls played against 2001 NRL Premiers, the Newcastle Knights in the 2002 World Club Challenge. McDermott played as a prop forward in Bradford's victory. He also played for Bradford from the interchange bench in their 2002 Super League Grand Final loss against St Helens. After ending his playing career in 2003, McDermott moved into coaching.

== Coaching career ==
=== Harlequins RL ===
McDermott had spells on the coaching staff at Super League clubs Huddersfield and Leeds before accepting his first top-flight head coaching role at Harlequins in July 2006, replacing Tony Rea. McDermott won his first match as a head coach against Castleford. He went on to claim five wins and four losses in the remainder of 2006.

McDermott remained at Harlequins for a further four seasons but the team decreased in performance. The team which had been in the top 5 in the year before McDermott's arrival finished 7th, then 9th then 9th again. Harlequins RL went on three long streaks of very poor form in the last season and a half of McDermott's tenure.

The 2009 saw a second half of the season collapse with the team winning only 1 of its last 12 games and finishing 11th.

The 2010 season saw an early win against Catalans Dragons, but again only one win in the first 11 games.

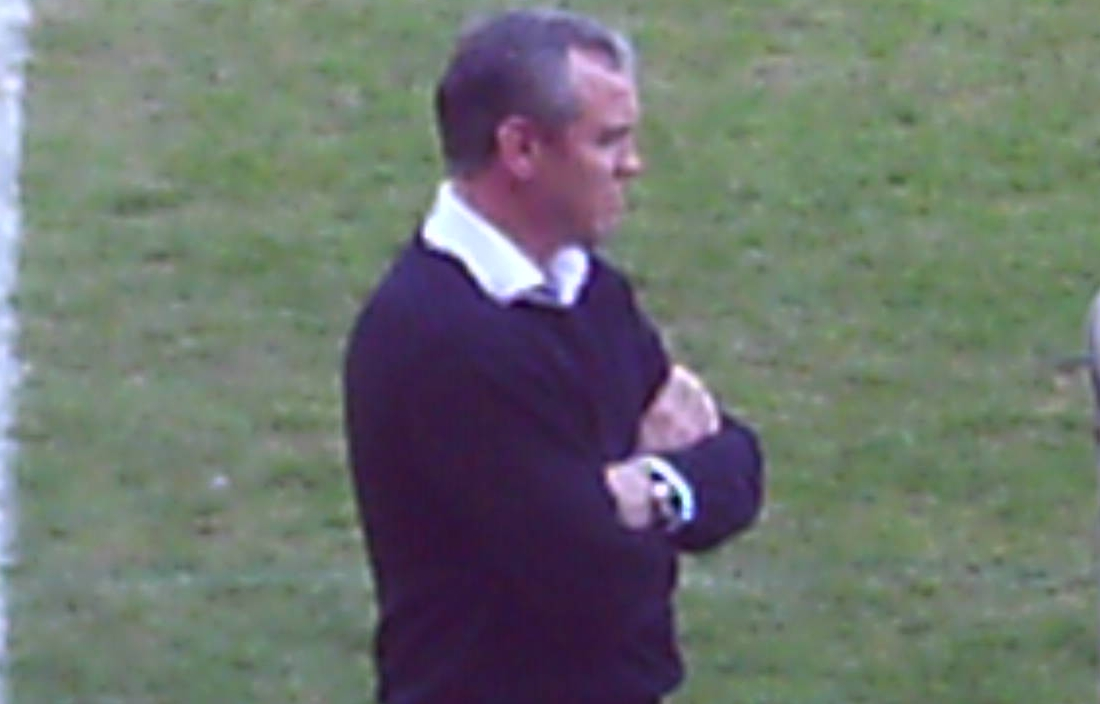
McDermott in charge of Harlequins Rugby League in 2010

There were quite a few big losses by scores such as 62–4, 58-0 and 52–12. After a midseason streak of four wins in five games, the team again returned to losing form, losing 7 out of the last 9. McDermott had not secured the team's better players to new contracts, such as Louie McCarthy-Scarsbrook, Will Sharp, Danny Orr, Oliver Wilkes and Luke Williamson and the team had finished 11th and 13th in successive seasons.

=== Leeds Rhinos ===
McDermott left Harlequins and returned to Leeds as Assistant Manager at the end of the 2010 season. On 25 October 2010, following the resignation of incumbent coach Brian McClennan, it was announced that McDermott would take over as head coach at Headingley on a three-year contract.

McDermott coached Leeds to the 2011 Challenge Cup Final defeat by Wigan at Wembley Stadium.

However, McDermott guided Leeds to 2011 Super League Grand Final victory over St. Helens at Old Trafford, after finishing in 5th place in the league. McDermott replicated the same feat in 2012, where Leeds won the World Club Challenge against Manly.

He coached Leeds to their 2012 Challenge Cup Final defeat by Warrington at Wembley Stadium.

Two months later, the two sides met again in the 2012 Super League Grand Final which Leeds won for the sixth time in nine years with the victory over Warrington at Old Trafford and making it two out of two for McDermott in his first two years as head coach.

By coincidence, on 12 April 2013 Leeds United announced their new manager as Brian McDermott, meaning that both the rugby league and football teams in the city of Leeds had managers with the same name. Both sides also had players by the name of Ryan Hall at the same time, one a 25-year-old winger for the rugby league side, the other a 25-year-old winger for Leeds United.

In 2014 McDermott coached Leeds in the 2014 Challenge Cup Final victory over Castleford at Wembley Stadium, their first Challenge Cup win since 1999. They were knocked out of the playoffs against Catalans Dragons after finishing 6th in the league, their worst position since 1996.

In 2015 McDermott coached Leeds to a historic treble, winning the Challenge Cup 50–0, scoring a last second try against Huddersfield to win the League Leaders' Shield, and beating Wigan in a major final for the first time by 22–20 in the 2015 Super League Grand Final victory at Old Trafford.

McDermott was a nominee for the BBC Sports Personality of the Year Coach Award at the end of the season. Leeds endured a difficult season in 2016 as they were flooded out of their training ground for the first half of the season and suffered a run of injuries that left them having to fight against relegation in the Qualifiers. At the start of 2017, with only the addition of Matt Parcell to the Leeds squad from the previous year, they finished runners up to Castleford in the table. They then beat Castleford in the 2017 Grand Final at Old Trafford, with long-serving players Rob Burrow and Danny McGuire leaving the club as champions.

After a run of seven losses in a row, the club sacked McDermott as head coach in July 2018.

=== Toronto Wolfpack ===
McDermott took over at the Toronto Wolfpack ahead of the 2019 RFL Championship season.

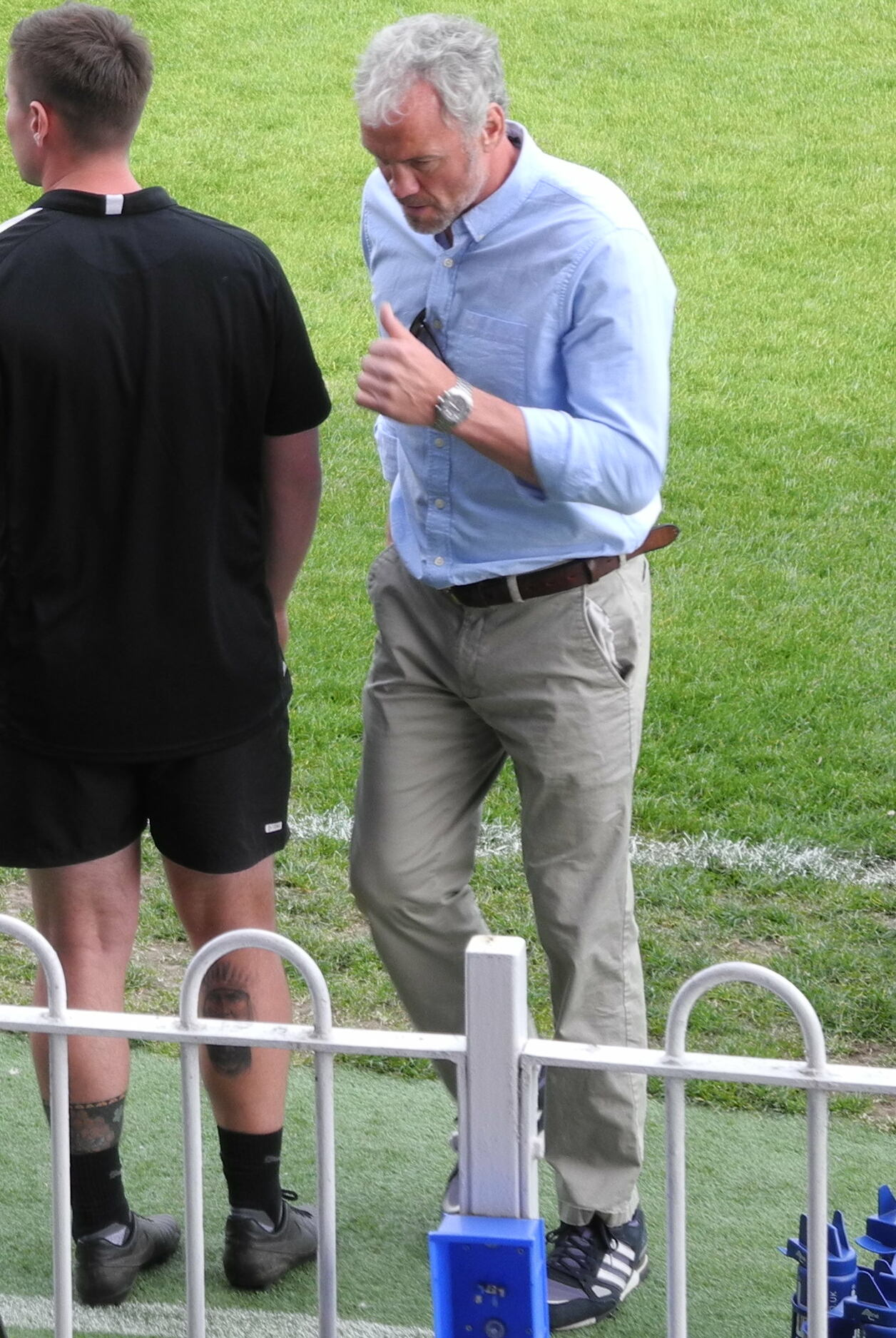
McDermott in charge of Toronto in 2019

=== Oldham RLFC ===
On 5 July 2021 it was reported that he had joined Oldham as a coaching consultant to Brendan Sheridan, following the departure of former head coach Matt Diskin in June.

=== Featherstone Rovers ===
It was reported on 22 October 2021 that he had taken over as head-coach from James Webster

=== Newcastle Knights ===
McDermott became assistant coach at the Newcastle Knights in November 2022, ahead of the 2023 NRL season in Australia.

=== Gold Coast Titans ===
McDermot became assistant coach at the Gold Coast Titans in September 2025, ahead of the 2026 NRL season in Australia.

== International ==
=== United States ===
In 2015, McDermott was named head coach of the United States, combining the job with his role at Leeds. His first outing as coach of the USA Hawks was in the 2017 Rugby League World Cup qualifiers, in which he guided the United States to victories over Jamaica and Canada, and subsequently qualified for the 2017 World Cup. After qualifying for the tournament he announced he was to stay on as the US coach until at least the end of the 2017 World Cup.

=== England ===
On 20 April 2026 it was reported that he had taken up the role of head-coach for England

== Honours ==
=== Player ===
- Super League (3): 1997, 2001, 2003
- League Leaders' Shield (3): 1999, 2001, 2003
- Challenge Cup (2): 2000, 2003
- World Club Challenge: 2002

=== Head Coach ===
- Super League (4): 2011, 2012, 2015, 2017
- League Leaders' Shield (1): 2015
- Challenge Cup (2): 2014, 2015
- World Club Challenge: 2012
