= Louie McCarthy-Scarsbrook =

Ireland & England international rugby league footballer

Louie "LMS" McCarthy Scarsbrook
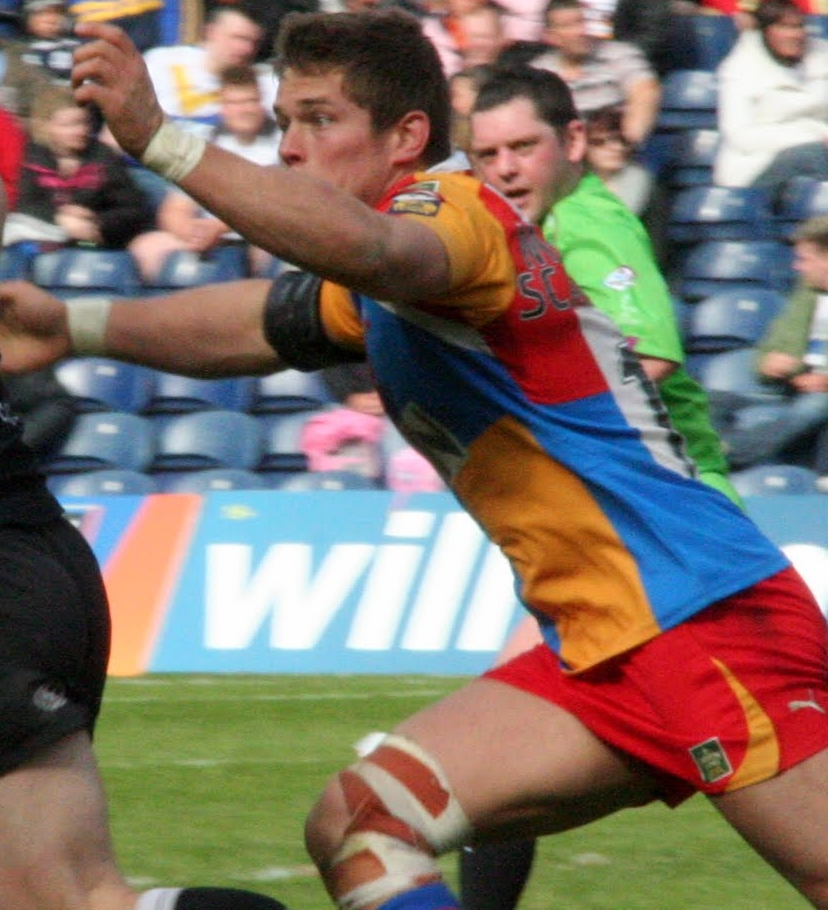

Personal information
- Full name: Louie McCarthy-Scarsbrook
- Born: 14 January 1986 (age 40) Whitechapel, London, England
- Height: 6 ft 2 in (1.88 m)
- Weight: 16 st 5 lb (104 kg)

Playing information
- Position: Prop, Loose forward, Second-row
Club
Years	Team	Pld	T	G	FG	P
2006–10	Harlequins RL	97	20	0	0	80
2011–23	St Helens	373	63	0	0	252
	Total	470	83	0	0	332
Representative
Years	Team	Pld	T	G	FG	P
2008–09	England	2	2	0	0	8
2017	Ireland	3	1	0	0	4
- Source: As of 10 October 2023

Louie McCarthy-Scarsbrook (born 14 January 1986) is a former rugby league footballer who last played as a prop, second-row or loose forward for St Helens in the Super League. He has played for both England and Ireland at international level.

He came through the London Broncos academy, but only played for the first team when it was named Harlequins RL in the Super League.

LMS was contracted to play for St. Helens until 2020, which would be his testimonial season. In close to twelve years, he won four League Leader's Shields in 2014, 2018, 2019 and 2022 plus five Super League championships. He also won the 2021 Challenge Cup with St Helens.

== Background ==
McCarthy-Scarsbrook was born on 14 January 1986 in Whitechapel, London, England. He grew up on the Isle of Dogs, and was educated at St Joseph's Academy, Blackheath. He played football as a goalkeeper during his youth, but was persuaded by one of his schoolteachers to try rugby league. He attended sixth form at Charlton Athletic FC as part of the London Broncos academy. He played for Greenwich Admirals before joining London Broncos Academy ranks in 2004.

== Playing career ==
=== Early career ===
McCarthy-Scarsbrook was a product of the Harlequins RL Junior Academy squad. He toured Australia with British Amateur Rugby League Association U18s in 2004. He spent the 2005 season on loan at Hull FC's Senior Academy, and played a prominent role in Hull's reserve grade Grand Final winning season.

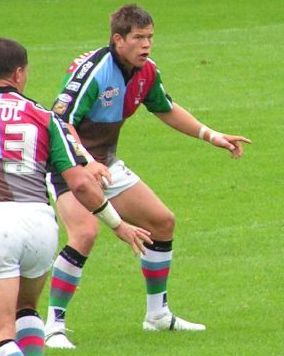
McCarthy-Scarsbrook playing for Harlequins Rugby League

=== Harlequins RL ===
McCarthy-Scarsbrook returned to London and in 2006 made his Super League début. By 2008 Harlequins coach Brian McDermott was tipping McCarthy-Scarsbrook for a place in England's World Cup squad.

McCarthy-Scarsbrook was named in the England training squad for the 2008 Rugby League World Cup.

McCarthy-Scarsbrook was named in the England team to face Wales at the Keepmoat Stadium, Doncaster prior to England's departure for the 2008 Rugby League World Cup.

McCarthy-Scarsbrook announced on 1 September 2010 that he was to leave Quins at the end of the season after turning down a new contract.

=== St Helens ===
On 3 September 2010, St Helens confirmed the capture of Louie McCarthy-Scarsbrook on a four-year deal starting in 2011, where he'll join up with St. Helens' other new signings Josh Perry and Michael Shenton. Upon Signing the deal Louie said, '"St Helens are entering an exciting time in their history and to be a part of that was a great pull." He continued: "Not only will they have a new stadium in 2012 but the quality of the players already in the squad means they will be challenging on all fronts. "I am looking forward to linking up with my new teammates and continuing to learn under Royce Simmons. "I would like to thank Quins for giving me the chance to play rugby league and I have enjoyed my time there. The fans and players have been excellent with me and I wish them all well in the future."

He played in the 2011 Super League Grand Final defeat by the Leeds Rhinos at Old Trafford.

In 2014, McCarthy-Scarsbrook made his 100th appearance for St Helens in their Challenge Cup fixture against Leeds.

St Helens reached the 2014 Super League Grand Final, and McCarthy-Scarsbrook was selected to play at second-row in their 14-6 victory over the Wigan Warriors at Old Trafford.

He played in the 2019 Challenge Cup Final defeat by the Warrington Wolves at Wembley Stadium.

He played in the 2019 Super League Grand Final victory over the Salford Red Devils at Old Trafford.

He played in St Helens 2020 Super League Grand Final victory over Wigan at the Kingston Communications Stadium in Hull.

He played for St. Helens in their 2021 Challenge Cup Final victory over Castleford. On 9 October 2021, he played for St. Helens in their 2021 Super League Grand Final victory over Catalans Dragons. In round 23 of the 2022 Super League season, McCarthy-Scarsbrook scored a rare double in St Helens 60-6 victory over Hull F.C. On 24 September 2022, McCarthy-Scarsbrook played off the interchange bench in St Helens 24-12 victory over Leeds in the 2022 Super League Grand Final. On 18 February 2023, McCarthy-Scarsbrook played in St Helens 13-12 upset victory over Penrith in the 2023 World Club Challenge. On 20 September 2023, McCarthy-Scarsbrook announced he would be retiring from rugby league. He played 26 games for St Helens in the 2023 Super League season as the club finished third on the table. He played in St Helens narrow loss against the Catalans Dragons in the semi-final which stopped them reaching a fifth successive grand final. This would also be McCarthy-Scarsbrook's final game as a player.

=== International career ===
McCarthy-Scarsbrook made his England début in the victory over Wales on 10 October 2008. His second game for England was also against Wales, a 48-12 victory in the 2009 Four Nations tournament in which he scored a try.

He later switched allegiance to Ireland, and was named in their 2017 Rugby League World Cup squad.
