= 2014 Super League season results =

Rugby league competition results

This is a list of the 2014 Super League season results. Super League is the top-flight rugby league competition in the United Kingdom and France. The 2014 season starts on 7 February and ends on 11 October with the 2014 Super League Grand Final at Old Trafford. The Magic Weekend is scheduled over the weekend of 17 and 18 May and will be played at the Etihad Stadium in Manchester for the third consecutive year, having been used for the 2012 and 2013 seasons.

The 2014 Super League season consisted of two stages. The regular season was played over 27 round-robin fixtures, in which each of the fourteen teams involved in the competition played each other once at home and once away, as well as their Magic Weekend fixtures played over the sixteenth round of the season. In Super League XVIII, a win was worth two points in the table, a draw worth one point apiece, and a loss yielded no points.

The league leaders at the end of the regular season, will receive the League Leaders' Shield, but the Championship will be decided through the second stage of the season—the play-offs. The top eight teams in the table contest to play in the 2014 Super League Grand Final, the winners of which will be crowned Super League XIX Champions.

== Regular season ==
(References next to the scores=Video Highlights) (Match Stats are shown at the conclusion of each video)

=== Round 1 ===
Home	Score	Away	Match Information
Home	Score	Away	Date and Time	Venue	Referee	Attendance
Wigan Warriors	8 – 24	Huddersfield Giants	7 February, 20:00 GMT	DW Stadium	Richard Silverwood	16,240
Warrington Wolves	8 – 38	St Helens R.F.C.	13 February, 20:00 GMT	Halliwell Jones Stadium	Phil Bentham	13,157
Hull F.C.	36 – 34	Catalans Dragons	14 February, 20:00 GMT	KC Stadium	Ben Thaler	11,400
Bradford Bulls	18 – 36	Castleford Tigers	16 February, 15:00 GMT	Provident Stadium	Robert Hicks	8,214
Hull Kingston Rovers	6 – 34	Leeds Rhinos	16 February, 15:00 GMT	KC Lightstream Stadium	Richard Silverwood	11,526
Salford Red Devils	18 – 14	Wakefield Trinity Wildcats	16 February, 15:00 GMT	AJ Bell Stadium	James Child	7,102
Widnes Vikings	64 – 10	London Broncos	16 February, 15:00 GMT	Select Security Stadium	Tim Roby	5,327

- The round-one fixture at the DW Stadium was brought back a week to enable the Warriors to fly down under to prepare for their World Club Challenge match.
- The Warrington Wolves began their tenth season at the Halliwell Jones Stadium
- 11,526 is the biggest ever attendance at the KC Lightstream Stadium.
- Castleford's Kirk Dixon scored his 1000th career point

=== Round 2 ===
Home	Score	Away	Match Information
Home	Score	Away	Date and Time	Venue	Referee	Attendance
Wakefield Trinity Wildcats	10 – 23	Bradford Bulls	20 February, 20:00 GMT	The Rapid Solicitors Stadium	Robert Hicks	4,049
Leeds Rhinos	18 – 12	Warrington Wolves	21 February, 20:00 GMT	Headingley Carnegie Stadium	Ben Thaler	16,164
St Helens R.F.C.	34 – 22	Hull F.C.	21 February, 20:00 GMT	Langtree Park	Richard Silverwood	13,448
London Broncos	18 – 44	Salford Red Devils	22 February, 15:00 GMT	The Hive Stadium	James Child	1,246
Huddersfield Giants	24 – 24	Hull Kingston Rovers	23 February, 15:00 GMT	John Smith's Stadium	Phil Bentham	7,180
Castleford Tigers	32 – 6	Catalans Dragons	23 February, 15:30 GMT	Wish Communications Stadium	Tim Roby	5,104
Wigan Warriors	–	Widnes Vikings	TBA^{A}	DW Stadium

=== Round 3 ===
Home	Score	Away	Match Information
Home	Score	Away	Date and Time	Venue	Referee	Attendance
Salford Red Devils	0 – 38	St Helens R.F.C.	27 February, 20:00 GMT	AJ Bell Stadium	Phil Bentham	6,353
Catalans Dragons	12 – 40	Leeds Rhinos	28 February, 19:00 GMT / 20:00 CET	Stade Gilbert Brutus	Richard Silverwood	6,300
Hull Kingston Rovers	10 – 30	Castleford Tigers	28 February, 20:00 GMT	KC Lightstream Stadium	Ben Thaler	7,022
Widnes Vikings	22 – 20	Huddersfield Giants	28 February, 20:00 GMT	Select Security Stadium	Robert Hicks	5,577
Bradford Bulls	25 – 12	London Broncos	2 March, 15:00 GMT	Odsal Stadium	Tim Roby	8,500
Warrington Wolves	18 – 16	Hull F.C.	2 March, 15:00 GMT	Halliwell Jones Stadium	James Child	10,276
Wigan Warriors	46 – 24	Wakefield Trinity Wildcats	2 March, 15:00 GMT	DW Stadium	Matt Thomason	11,703

- The Castleford Tigers made history with their first away win over Hull KR in the Super League era.

Here are February's top 5 tries:

=== Round 4 ===
Home	Score	Away	Match Information
Home	Score	Away	Date and Time	Venue	Referee	Attendance
Widnes Vikings	32 – 18	Salford Red Devils	6 March, 20:00 GMT	Select Security Stadium	Richard Silverwood	5,291
St Helens R.F.C.	38 – 18	Hull Kingston Rovers	7 March, 20:00 GMT	Langtree Park	Tim Roby	11,818
Hull F.C.	44 – 16	Bradford Bulls	7 March, 20:00 GMT	Kingston Communications Stadium	Phil Bentham	11,307
Huddersfield Giants	12 – 12	Leeds Rhinos	7 March, 20:00 GMT	John Smith's Stadium	James Child	8,759
Wakefield Trinity Wildcats	56 – 14	Catalans Dragons	9 March, 15:00 GMT	The Rapid Solicitors Stadium	Ben Thaler	4,190
London Broncos	16 – 44	Warrington Wolves	9 March, 15:00 GMT	The Hive Stadium	Matt Thomason	1,377
Castleford Tigers	36 – 31	Wigan Warriors	9 March, 15:00 GMT	Wish Communications Stadium	Robert Hicks	8,504

- Leeds' draw ended a five match losing streak against Huddersfield.
- Castleford beat Wigan at home for the first time in eight years.

=== Round 5 ===
Home	Score	Away	Match Information
Home	Score	Away	Date and Time	Venue	Referee	Attendance
Leeds Rhinos	38 – 4	Widnes Vikings	14 March, 20:00 GMT	Headingley Carnegie Stadium	Robert Hicks	14,430
Salford Red Devils	12 – 28	Warrington Wolves	14 March, 20:00 GMT	Salford City Stadium	Ben Thaler	6,260
St. Helens	44 – 22	Catalans Dragons	14 March, 20:00 GMT	Langtree Park	George Stokes	11,321
Wigan Warriors	34 – 20	Hull Kingston Rovers	14 March, 20:00 GMT	DW Stadium	Richard Silverwood	12,801
London Broncos	22 – 50	Wakefield Trinity Wildcats	15 March, 15:00 GMT	The Hive Stadium	Phil Bentham	1,017
Bradford Bulls	18 – 66	Huddersfield Giants	16 March, 15:00 GMT	Odsal Stadium	Chris Leatherbarrow	6,781
Castleford Tigers	19 – 16	Hull F.C.	16 March, 15:30 GMT	Wish Communications Stadium	Tim Roby	9,867

- Wigan won their 13th consecutive game against Hull KR.
- Huddersfield mercilessly exposed Bradford's depleted resources with a Super League record 66–18 victory at the Provident Stadium.

=== Round 6 ===
Home	Score	Away	Match Information
Home	Score	Away	Date and Time	Venue	Referee	Attendance
Warrington Wolves	4 – 12	Wigan Warriors	20 March, 20:00 GMT	Halliwell Jones Stadium	Phil Bentham	11,550
Leeds Rhinos	54 – 6	London Broncos	21 March, 20:00 GMT	Headingley Carnegie Stadium	Chris Leatherbarrow	12,870
Catalans Dragons	30 – 14	Huddersfield Giants	22 March, 20:00 GMT / 21:00 CET	Stade Gilbert Brutus	Richard Silverwood	6,600
Hull Kingston Rovers	16 – 0	Bradford Bulls	23 March, 20:00 GMT	KC Lightstream Stadium	Robert Hicks	7,008
Salford Red Devils	23 – 16	Castleford Tigers	23 March, 15:00 GMT	AJ Bell Stadium	James Child	5,823
Hull F.C.	0 – 7	Widnes Vikings	23 March, 15:00 GMT	Kingston Communications Stadium	Ben Thaler	10,386
Wakefield Trinity Wildcats	16 – 24	St Helens R.F.C.	23 March, 15:30 GMT	The Rapid Solicitors Stadium	Tim Roby	5,087

=== Round 7 ===
Home	Score	Away	Match Information
Home	Score	Away	Date and Time	Venue	Referee	Attendance
London Broncos	6 – 54	Castleford Tigers	27 March, 20:00 GMT	The Hive Stadium	Ben Thaler	1,036
Wigan Warriors	22 – 16	Catalans Dragons	28 March, 20:00 GMT	DW Stadium	Tim Roby	11,216
Hull F.C.	30 – 8	Salford Red Devils	28 March, 20:00 GMT	Kingston Communications Stadium	Robert Hicks	9,821
St Helens R.F.C.	14 – 10	Leeds Rhinos	28 March, 20:00 GMT	Langtree Park	Richard Silverwood	13,788
Widnes Vikings	22 – 18	Bradford Bulls	30 March, 15:00 GMT	Select Security Stadium	George Stokes	5,581
Hull Kingston Rovers	44 – 6	Wakefield Trinity Wildcats	30 March, 15:00 GMT	KC Lightstream Stadium	Phil Bentham	6,983
Huddersfield Giants	14 – 33	Warrington Wolves	30 March, 15:00 GMT	John Smith's Stadium	James Child	7,068

- Kevin Sinfield scored his 3500th point for the Leeds Rhinos.
- Warrington came from 14-4 down at half-time to ease to a 10th consecutive win over Huddersfield.

Here are March's top 5 tries:

=== Round 8 ===
Home	Score	Away	Match Information
Home	Score	Away	Date and Time	Venue	Referee	Attendance
Hull F.C.	30 – 6	Huddersfield Giants	10 April, 20:00 GMT	Kingston Communications Stadium	Richard Silverwood	9,515
Wigan Warriors	36 – 14	London Broncos	11 April, 20:00 GMT	DW Stadium	Matt Thomason	10,680
Warrington Wolves	12 – 25	Hull Kingston Rovers	11 April, 20:00 GMT	Halliwell Jones Stadium	Robert Hicks	8,778
Leeds Rhinos	42 – 6	Wakefield Trinity Wildcats	11 April, 20:00 GMT	Headingley Carnegie Stadium	Tim Roby	13,969
Bradford Bulls	24 – 38	Salford Red Devils	11 April, 20:00 GMT	Provident Stadium	Phil Bentham	6,144
Castleford Tigers	28 – 30	St Helens R.F.C.	11 April, 20:00 GMT	Wish Communications Stadium	Ben Thaler	6,487
Catalans Dragons	42 – 20	Widnes Vikings	12 April, 15:30 GMT / 16:30 CET	Stade Gilbert Brutus	James Child	9,588

- St Helens' Paul Wellens scored his 1000th point of his career.

=== Round 9 - Easter Matches ===
Home	Score	Away	Match Information
Home	Score	Away	Date and Time	Venue	Referee	Attendance
Bradford Bulls	6 – 46	Leeds Rhinos	17 April, 20:00 GMT	Provident Stadium	Robert Hicks	10,106
London Broncos	22 – 28	Catalans Dragons	17 April, 20:00 GMT	The Hive Stadium	Chris Leatherbarrow	1,002
Hull Kingston Rovers	21 – 20	Hull F.C.	17 April, 20:00 GMT	KC Lightstream Stadium	James Child	10,197
St Helens R.F.C.	14 – 33	Wigan Warriors	18 April, 12:15 GMT	Langtree Park	Richard Silverwood	17,980
Warrington Wolves	44 – 6	Widnes Vikings	18 April, 14:45 GMT	Halliwell Jones Stadium	Ben Thaler	10,500
Wakefield Trinity Wildcats	20 – 43	Castleford Tigers	18 April, 15:00 GMT	The Rapid Solicitors Stadium	Phil Bentham	5,159
Salford Red Devils	22 – 42	Huddersfield Giants	18 April, 18:00 GMT	AJ Bell Stadium	Tim Roby	5,068

- 17,980 is the highest attendance to watch a game at Langtree Park.
- Coming into this round St Helens were the only unbeaten team in the comp. Their unbeaten run came to an end with a defeat to the defending champions the Wigan Warriors. All teams have now lost at least once in the competition, but the London Broncos are the only team yet to win a game at this stage of the season.
- Rob Burrow made his 400th appearance for Leeds.
- Brett Kearney made his 100th appearance for Bradford.
- Hull KR's Craig Hall kicked the winning point, 46 seconds from time, to secure a win against his former club (Hull F.C.) in the 221st Humber Derby.
- The Catalans Dragons have now beaten the Broncos 10 times consecutively.

=== Round 10 ===
Home	Score	Away	Match Information
Home	Score	Away	Date and Time	Venue	Referee	Attendance
Wigan Warriors	84 – 6	Bradford Bulls	21 April, 15:00 GMT	DW Stadium	Tim Roby	15,529
Widnes Vikings	40 – 26	St Helens R.F.C.	21 April, 15:00 GMT	Select Security Stadium	James Child	7,706
Leeds Rhinos	32 – 4	Salford Red Devils	21 April, 15:00 GMT	Headingley Carnegie Stadium	Ben Thaler	14,013
Hull F.C.	40 – 4	London Broncos	21 April, 15:00 GMT	Kingston Communications Stadium	George Stokes	9,538
Huddersfield Giants	36 – 16	Wakefield Trinity Wildcats	21 April, 15:00 GMT	John Smith's Stadium	Robert Hicks	5,487
Castleford Tigers	40 – 6	Warrington Wolves	21 April, 15:30 GMT	Wish Communications Stadium	Richard Silverwood	6,853
Catalans Dragons	37 – 24	Hull Kingston Rovers	21 April, 18:00 GMT / 19:00 CET	Stade Gilbert Brutus	Phil Bentham	9,863

Here are April's top 5 tries:

=== Round 11 ===
Home	Score	Away	Match Information
Home	Score	Away	Date and Time	Venue	Referee	Attendance
St Helens R.F.C.	48 – 18	London Broncos	1 May, 20:00 GMT	Langtree Park	Matt Thomason	9,408
Leeds Rhinos	28 – 12	Wigan Warriors	2 May, 20:00 GMT	Headingley Carnegie Stadium	Phil Bentham	18,139
Catalans Dragons	37 – 24	Salford Red Devils	3 May, 18:00 GMT / 19:00 CET	Stade Gilbert Brutus	Ben Thaler	7,862
Bradford Bulls	34 – 28	Warrington Wolves	4 May, 15:00 GMT	Provident Stadium	Richard Silverwood	6,173
Huddersfield Giants	29 – 28	Castleford Tigers	4 May, 15:00 GMT	John Smith's Stadium	James Child	7,195
Hull Kingston Rovers	29 – 34	Widnes Vikings	4 May, 15:00 GMT	KC Lightstream Stadium	Robert Hicks	7,007
Hull F.C.	16 – 23	Wakefield Trinity Wildcats	4 May, 15:00 GMT	Kingston Communications Stadium	Tim Roby	10,088

- St. Helens won their 11th consecutive game against the Londoners
- Zak Hardaker scored his 50th try for Leeds
- Bradford ended a 10-game losing streak against Warrington.
- Jermaine McGillvary made his 100th appearance for Huddersfield
- Danny Brough scored his 1000th point for Huddersfield
- Hull F.C. lead 16-0 after 52 minutes but then Wakefield Trinity replied with 23 unanswered points to stun the home team.
- Wakefield's Danny Washbrook made his 200th career appearance.

=== Round 12 ===
Home	Score	Away	Match Information
Home	Score	Away	Date and Time	Venue	Referee	Attendance
Castleford Tigers	14 – 22	Leeds Rhinos	8 May, 20:00 GMT	Wish Communications Stadium	Richard Silverwood	9,208
Warrington Wolves	42 – 10	Catalans Dragons	9 May, 20:00 GMT	Halliwell Jones Stadium	James Child	8,816
Hull F.C.	16 – 44	Wigan Warriors	9 May, 20:00 GMT	Kingston Communications Stadium	Robert Hicks	10,539
Widnes Vikings	18 – 24	Wakefield Trinity Wildcats	9 May, 20:00 GMT	Select Security Stadium	Ben Thaler	5,186
London Broncos	16 – 30	Huddersfield Giants	10 May, 15:00 GMT	The Hive Stadium	Tim Roby	1,035
Salford Red Devils	16 – 16	Hull Kingston Rovers	10 May, 18:00 GMT	AJ Bell Stadium	Phil Bentham	2,903
Bradford Bulls	0 – 50	St Helens R.F.C.	11 May, 15:00 GMT	Provident Stadium	Matt Thomason	6,311

- Leeds' Ryan Bailey made his 300th appearance for the Rhinos.
- Warringtons' Joel Monaghan made his 100th appearance for the Wolves. He also scored his 100th try for his club in the same match.
- Wakefield Trinity have now beaten Widnes for 7 consecutive games. Widnes' last win against the Wildcats was back in 2005.

=== Round 13 - Magic Weekend ^{B} ===
Home	Score	Away	Match Information
Home	Score	Away	Date and Time	Venue	Referee	Attendance
London Broncos	22 – 24	Catalans Dragons	17 May, 12:30 GMT	Etihad Stadium	Matt Thomason	36,399 ^{C}
Widnes Vikings	30 – 24	Salford Red Devils	17 May, 14:45 GMT	Etihad Stadium	Tim Roby	36,399 ^{C}
Hull Kingston Rovers	38 – 24	Hull F.C.	17 May, 17:00 GMT	Etihad Stadium	Richard Silverwood	36,399 ^{C}
Wigan Warriors	18 – 14	Leeds Rhinos	17 May, 19:15 GMT	Etihad Stadium	Ben Thaler	36,399 ^{C}
Wakefield Trinity Wildcats	12 – 50	Castleford Tigers	18 May, 12:30 GMT	Etihad Stadium	James Child	28,213 ^{D}
Huddersfield Giants	54 – 16	Bradford Bulls	18 May, 14:45 GMT	Etihad Stadium	Robert Hicks	28,213 ^{D}
Warrington Wolves	41 – 24	St Helens R.F.C.	18 May, 17:00 GMT	Etihad Stadium	Phil Bentham	28,213 ^{D}

- 36,399 is the biggest attendance figure for a Magic Weekend day.
- London have now lost 11 consecutive matches against the Catalans Dragons.
- Catalans' Vincent Duport made his 100th Super League appearance.
- The Widnes Vikings won their first ever Magic Weekend fixture.
- Hull Kingston Rovers have now beaten their rivals in 5 of their previous 6 Magic Weekend meetings.
- Hull F.C.'s Jason Crookes was the first player this season to be sent off! He was sent off the pitch following a dangerous high tackle on Hull Kingston Rovers center Liam Salter.
- Wigan's Michael McIlorum made his 150th Super League appearance.
- Watch this insane fight which resulted in '3 Yellow Cards' (Leeds vs. Wigan)
- Bradford have now lost 7 out of their 8 Magic Weekend fixtures.
- Warrington have now won 6 out of their 8 Magic Weekend fixtures.
- 64,552 is the biggest attendance figure for a Magic Weekend. The previous record was back in 2012 when a figure of 63,716 fans turned up to watch the matches at the Super League showcase weekend.

=== Round 14 ===
Home	Score	Away	Match Information
Home	Score	Away	Date and Time	Venue	Referee	Attendance
Salford Red Devils	4 – 25	Wigan Warriors	22 May, 20:00 GMT	AJ Bell Stadium	Phil Bentham	3,706
St Helens R.F.C.	41 – 22	Huddersfield Giants	23 May, 20:00 GMT	Langtree Park	Richard Silverwood	10,218
Leeds Rhinos	20 – 6	Hull F.C.	23 May, 20:00 GMT	Headingley Carnegie Stadium	James Child	15,247
Catalans Dragons	46 – 4	Bradford Bulls	24 May, 18:00 GMT / 19:00 CET	Stade Gilbert Brutus	Tim Roby	6,890
Hull Kingston Rovers	48 – 16	London Broncos	25 May, 15:00 GMT	KC Lightstream Stadium	Robert Hicks	7,439
Wakefield Trinity Wildcats	4 – 36	Warrington Wolves	25 May, 15:00 GMT	The Rapid Solicitors Stadium	George Stokes	3,698
Castleford Tigers	34 – 22	Widnes Vikings	25 May, 15:30 GMT	Wish Communications Stadium	Ben Thaler	5,576

- Huddersfield's Brett Ferres made his 200th Super League appearance.
- Warrington have now beaten Wakefield Trinity 9 consecutive times with 5 of those wins coming at The Rapid Solicitors Stadium (Wakefield's home ground).
- Widnes' Kevin Brown made his 250th career appearance

=== Round 15 ===
Home	Score	Away	Match Information
Home	Score	Away	Date and Time	Venue	Referee	Attendance
Huddersfield Giants	31 – 22	Wigan Warriors	29 May, 20:00 GMT	John Smith's Stadium	Ben Thaler	6,106
St Helens R.F.C.	32 – 12	Salford Red Devils	30 May, 20:00 GMT	Langtree Park	Robert Hicks	11,000
Warrington Wolves	24 – 6	Leeds Rhinos	30 May, 20:00 GMT	Halliwell Jones Stadium	James Child	10,312
Widnes Vikings	26 – 26	Catalans Dragons	30 May, 20:00 GMT	Select Security Stadium	Phil Bentham	4,745
London Broncos	12 – 50	Hull F.C.	31 May, 15:00 GMT	The Hive Stadium	George Stokes	1,135
Bradford Bulls	20 – 12	Wakefield Trinity Wildcats	1 June, 15:00 GMT	Provident Stadium	Richard Silverwood	6,249
Castleford Tigers	54 – 12	Hull Kingston Rovers	1 June, 15:30 GMT	Wish Communications Stadium	Tim Roby	7,196

- Leeds' Kylie Leuluai made his 200th Super League appearance.
- Warrington's Chris Bridge scored his 1000th career point. He also brought up another milestone as he scored his 100th try for his club.
- Wakefield Trinity have now failed to win any of their past seven matches at the Provident Stadium (Bradford's home ground).
- Castleford's Luke Dorn scored his 150th try in the British game.

Here are May's top 5 tries:

=== Round 16 ===
Home	Score	Away	Match Information
Home	Score	Away	Date and Time	Venue	Referee	Attendance
Leeds Rhinos	22 – 24	Huddersfield Giants	12 June, 20:00 GMT	Headingley Carnegie Stadium	Richard Silverwood	13,104
Widnes Vikings	6 – 56	Hull F.C.	13 June, 20:00 GMT	Select Security Stadium	Matt Thomason	5,014
Hull Kingston Rovers	4 – 34	Warrington Wolves	13 June, 20:00 GMT	KC Lightstream Stadium	Ben Thaler	6,850
Wakefield Trinity Wildcats	18 – 10	London Broncos	13 June, 20:00 GMT	The Rapid Solicitors Stadium	Robert Hicks	4,079
Wigan Warriors	46 – 6	Castleford Tigers	13 June, 20:00 GMT	DW Stadium	Phil Bentham	11,914
Catalans Dragons	42 – 0	St Helens R.F.C.	14 June, 18:00 GMT / 19:00 CET	Stade Gilbert Brutus	James Child	7,276
Salford Red Devils	46 – 18	Bradford Bulls	15 June, 15:00 GMT	AJ Bell Stadium	George Stokes	3,407

- Leeds have now failed to beat Huddersfield in 8 consecutive meetings. This was also Leeds' first home defeat of the season.
- Catalans Dragons' Thomas Bosc scored his 1,000th super league point in his team's win over St. Helens.

=== Catchup game: Wigan vs Widnes ===
Home	Score	Away	Match Information
Home	Score	Away	Date and Time	Venue	Referee	Attendance
Wigan Warriors	48 – 4	Widnes Vikings	18 June, 20:00 GMT	DW Stadium	James Child	11,638

- This game was scheduled to play in Round 2, but due to Wigan's participation in the 2014 World Club Challenge, it has been shifted to this date.

=== Round 17 ===
Home	Score	Away	Match Information
Home	Score	Away	Date and Time	Venue	Referee	Attendance
Bradford Bulls	18 – 44	Hull Kingston Rovers	20 June, 20:00 GMT	Provident Stadium	Robert Hicks	5,601
Catalans Dragons	20 – 16	Hull F.C.	21 June, 18:00 GMT / 19:00 CET	Stade Gilbert Brutus	Phil Bentham	9,275
Huddersfield Giants	38 – 22	London Broncos	21 June, 15:00 GMT	John Smith's Stadium	Tim Roby	4,849
St Helens R.F.C.	38 – 16	Castleford Tigers	22 June, 15:00 GMT	Langtree Park	Richard Silverwood	12,648
Wakefield Trinity Wildcats	36 – 28	Wigan Warriors	22 June, 15:00 GMT	The Rapid Solicitors Stadium	George Stokes	4,069
Warrington Wolves	36 – 20	Salford Red Devils	22 June, 15:00 GMT	Halliwell Jones Stadium	James Child	10,120
Widnes Vikings	28 – 38	Leeds Rhinos	22 June, 15:00 GMT	Select Security Stadium	Ben Thaler	5,543

- Huddersfield have now beaten London for 15 consecutive matches. The last time the Londoners beat Huddersfield was back in 2008.
- St Helens' Jon Wilkin made his 300th appearance for the "Red V".
- Wakefield Trinity beat Wigan for the first time since 2009.

=== Round 18 ===
Home	Score	Away	Match Information
Home	Score	Away	Date and Time	Venue	Referee	Attendance
Hull Kingston Rovers	22 – 26	Huddersfield Giants	26 June, 20:00 GMT	KC Lightstream Stadium	Ben Thaler	8,953
Wigan Warriors	12 – 16	St Helens R.F.C.	27 June, 20:00 GMT	DW Stadium	Phil Bentham	20,224
London Broncos	24 – 42	Widnes Vikings	28 June, 15:00 GMT	The Hive Stadium	George Stokes	1,422
Castleford Tigers	14 – 10	Salford Red Devils	28 June, 19:00 GMT	Wish Communications Stadium	Tim Roby	5,937
Wakefield Trinity Wildcats	20 – 20	Hull F.C.	29 June, 15:00 GMT	The Rapid Solicitors Stadium	Richard Silverwood	5,168
Leeds Rhinos	32 – 31	Catalans Dragons	29 June, 15:00 GMT	Headingley Carnegie Stadium	Robert Hicks	13,888
Warrington Wolves	50 – 24	Bradford Bulls	29 June, 15:00 GMT	Halliwell Jones Stadium	Matt Thomason	9,003

- Leeds' Jamie Peacock made his 400th Super League appearance.

Here are June's top 5 tries:

=== Round 19 ===
Home	Score	Away	Match Information
Home	Score	Away	Date and Time	Venue	Referee	Attendance
Widnes Vikings	20 – 40	Castleford Tigers	3 July, 20:00 GMT	Select Security Stadium	Phil Bentham	4,562
Hull F.C.	18 – 24	Warrington Wolves	4 July, 20:00 GMT	Kingston Communications Stadium	Ben Thaler	12,328
Wakefield Trinity Wildcats	16 – 14	Leeds Rhinos	4 July, 20:00 GMT	The Rapid Solicitors Stadium	Matt Thomason	3,364
London Broncos	6 – 58	Wigan Warriors	5 July, 15:00 GMT	The Hive Stadium	Joe Cobb	2,013
Huddersfield Giants	10 – 36	Salford Red Devils	5 July, 15:00 GMT	John Smith's Stadium	Robert Hicks	5,681
Bradford Bulls	30 – 32	Catalans Dragons	6 July, 15:00 GMT	Provident Stadium	George Stokes	5,188
Hull Kingston Rovers	40 – 10	St Helens R.F.C.	6 July, 15:00 GMT	KC Lightstream Stadium	James Child	7,611

- Catalans' Vincent Duport made his 150th career appearance.
- 2007 was the last time St. Helens beat Hull Kingston Rovers at the KC Lightstream Stadium.

=== Round 20 ===
Home	Score	Away	Match Information
Home	Score	Away	Date and Time	Venue	Referee	Attendance
Wakefield Trinity Wildcats	12 – 10	Widnes Vikings	10 July, 20:00 GMT	The Rapid Solicitors Stadium	Ben Thaler	3,932
Leeds Rhinos	30 – 6	Hull Kingston Rovers	11 July, 20:00 GMT	Headingley Carnegie Stadium	Phil Bentham	14,192
St Helens R.F.C.	46 – 22	Bradford Bulls	11 July, 20:00 GMT	Langtree Park	Robert Hicks	10,238
Castleford Tigers	44 – 30	Huddersfield Giants	11 July, 20:00 GMT	Wish Communications Stadium	Richard Silverwood	5,310
Catalans Dragons	16 – 37	Wigan Warriors	12 July, 18:00 GMT / 19:00 CET	Stade Gilbert Brutus	James Child	7,498
Salford Red Devils	35 – 22	Hull F.C.	12 July, 19:30 GMT	AJ Bell Stadium	Matt Thomason	3,421
Warrington Wolves	72 – 12	London Broncos	13 July, 15:00 GMT	Halliwell Jones Stadium	Chris Leatherbarrow	9,381

- The last time Widnes beat Wakefield Trinity was back in 2005.
- London still haven't won a match this season and their defeat against Warrington has now made it mathematically impossible to avoid relegation.

=== Round 21 ===
Home	Score	Away	Match Information
Home	Score	Away	Date and Time	Venue	Referee	Attendance
Leeds Rhinos	24 – 24	Castleford Tigers	17 July, 20:00 GMT	Headingley Carnegie Stadium	Ben Thaler	16,173
Wigan Warriors	56 – 10	Hull F.C.	18 July, 20:00 GMT	DW Stadium	Richard Silverwood	12,493
Widnes Vikings	28 – 14	Warrington Wolves	18 July, 20:00 GMT	Select Security Stadium	Phil Bentham	7,158
London Broncos	16 – 58	St Helens R.F.C.	19 July, 15:00 GMT	The Hive Stadium	Tim Roby	1,791
Catalans Dragons	40 – 6	Wakefield Trinity Wildcats	19 July, 18:00 GMT / 19:00 CET	Stade Gilbert Brutus	Robert Hicks	8,256
Huddersfield Giants	52 – 26	Bradford Bulls	20 July, 15:00 GMT	John Smith's Stadium	Chris Leatherbarrow	6,145
Hull Kingston Rovers	18 – 38	Salford Red Devils	20 July, 15:00 GMT	KC Lightstream Stadium	James Child	8,213

- Wigan's Josh Charnley made his 100th Super League appearance
- Bradford's defeat against Huddersfield has now made it mathematically impossible to remain in the Super League next season. This is the first time, in 40 years, that Bradford will not be playing in England's top rugby league competition.
- Kevin Sinfield received his one and only red card for headbutting Luke Dorn.

=== Round 22 ===
Home	Score	Away	Match Information
Home	Score	Away	Date and Time	Venue	Referee	Attendance
Hull F.C.	18 – 18	Castleford Tigers	24 July, 20:00 GMT	Kingston Communications Stadium	James Child	9,959
Salford Red Devils	18 – 22	Leeds Rhinos	25 July, 20:00 GMT	AJ Bell Stadium	Richard Silverwood	5,012
St Helens R.F.C.	44 – 22	Widnes Vikings	25 July, 20:00 GMT	Langtree Park	Ben Thaler	11,844
London Broncos	10 – 62	Hull Kingston Rovers	26 July, 15:00 GMT	The Hive Stadium	Matt Thomason	1,084
Bradford Bulls	16 – 8	Wigan Warriors	27 July, 15:00 GMT	Provident Stadium	Robert Hicks	6,535
Huddersfield Giants	38 – 16	Catalans Dragons	27 July, 15:00 GMT	John Smith's Stadium	Phil Bentham	4,931
Warrington Wolves	26 – 40	Wakefield Trinity Wildcats	27 July, 15:00 GMT	Halliwell Jones Stadium	Tim Roby	9,252

- Hudderfield's Jermaine McGillvary scored his 100th career try in his team's 38–16 win.
- The Catalans Dragons defeat against the Giants means that they haven't won at the John Smith's Stadium since 2009.
- Wakefield's 40–26 victory was their first win over Warrington in 10 attempts.

=== Round 23 ===
Home	Score	Away	Match Information
Home	Score	Away	Date and Time	Venue	Referee	Attendance
Wigan Warriors	45 – 4	Salford Red Devils	31 July, 20:00 GMT	DW Stadium	Phil Bentham	12,962
Hull F.C.	19 – 12	St Helens R.F.C.	1 August, 20:00 GMT	Kingston Communications Stadium	Ben Thaler	10,214
Leeds Rhinos	14 – 20	Bradford Bulls	1 August, 20:00 GMT	Headingley Carnegie Stadium	Tim Roby	16,009
Catalans Dragons	24 – 26	Warrington Wolves	1 August, 20:00 GMT / 21:00 CET	Stade Gilbert Brutus	Richard Silverwood	7,000
Wakefield Trinity Wildcats	18 – 36	Huddersfield Giants	3 August, 15:00 GMT	The Rapid Solicitors Stadium	James Child	4,317
Widnes Vikings	28 – 10	Hull Kingston Rovers	3 August, 15:00 GMT	Select Security Stadium	Robert Hicks	5,345
Castleford Tigers	64 – 18	London Broncos	3 August, 15:30 GMT	Wish Communications Stadium	Joe Cobb	5,233

Here are July's top 5 tries:

=== Round 24 ===
Home	Score	Away	Match Information
Home	Score	Away	Date and Time	Venue	Referee	Attendance
Hull Kingston Rovers	14 – 14	Wigan Warriors	14 August, 20:00 GMT	KC Lightstream Stadium	Richard Silverwood	6,801
Salford Red Devils	34 – 22	Catalans Dragons	15 August, 20:00 GMT	AJ Bell Stadium	Ben Thaler	6,000
St Helens R.F.C.	40 – 16	Wakefield Trinity Wildcats	15 August, 20:00 GMT	Langtree Park	Phil Bentham	11,000
Warrington Wolves	48 – 10	Castleford Tigers	15 August, 20:00 GMT	Halliwell Jones Stadium	James Child	8,391
Huddersfield Giants	28 – 14	Widnes Vikings	17 August, 15:00 GMT	John Smith's Stadium	Matt Thomason	5,346
Bradford Bulls	34 – 28	Hull F.C.	17 August, 15:00 GMT	Provident Stadium	Robert Hicks	6,337
London Broncos	40 – 36	Leeds Rhinos	17 August, 15:00 GMT	The Hive Stadium	Tim Roby	1,268

- Ian Henderson made his 100th appearance for the Catalans Dragons.
- Catalans' Thomas Bosc kicked his 500th goal for the French club.
- Bradford's Jamie Foster scored his 1000th career point in his team's win over Hull FC.
- The Broncos' win over Leeds now means that every team in the competition has won at least once.

=== Round 25 ===
Home	Score	Away	Match Information
Home	Score	Away	Date and Time	Venue	Referee	Attendance
Warrington Wolves	24 – 24	Huddersfield Giants	28 August, 20:00 GMT	Halliwell Jones Stadium	Ben Thaler	8,777
Leeds Rhinos	12 – 13	St Helens R.F.C.	29 August, 20:00 GMT	Headingley Carnegie Stadium	Richard Silverwood	17,682
Widnes Vikings	24 – 10	Wigan Warriors	29 August, 20:00 GMT	Select Security Stadium	Phil Bentham	6,223
Hull F.C.	28 – 0	Hull Kingston Rovers	29 August, 15:00 GMT	Kingston Communications Stadium	James Child	18,104
Catalans Dragons	46 – 4	London Broncos	30 August, 18:00 GMT / 19:00 CET	Stade Gilbert Brutus	Tim Roby	7,067
Wakefield Trinity Wildcats	42 – 6	Salford Red Devils	31 August, 15:00 GMT	The Rapid Solicitors Stadium	Robert Hicks	4,016
Castleford Tigers	32 – 18	Bradford Bulls	31 August, 15:30 GMT	Wish Communications Stadium	George Stokes	7,428

- The Saints win over the Rhinos has now made them guaranteed winners of the 2014 Super League's League Leaders' Shield for the first time since 2008.

Here are August's top 5 tries:

=== Round 26 ===
Home	Score	Away	Match Information
Home	Score	Away	Date and Time	Venue	Referee	Attendance
St Helens R.F.C.	12 – 39	Warrington Wolves	4 September, 20:00 GMT	Langtree Park	James Child	12,854
Wigan Warriors	21 – 6	Leeds Rhinos	5 September, 20:00 GMT	DW Stadium	Ben Thaler	20,265
Bradford Bulls	12 – 32	Widnes Vikings	7 September, 15:00 GMT	Provident Stadium	Robert Hicks	7,438
Huddersfield Giants	38 – 28	Hull F.C.	7 September, 15:00 GMT	John Smith's Stadium	Phil Bentham	6,370
Hull Kingston Rovers	14 – 32	Catalans Dragons	7 September, 15:00 GMT	KC Lightstream Stadium	Richard Silverwood	6,412
Salford Red Devils	58 – 26	London Broncos	7 September, 15:00 GMT	AJ Bell Stadium	Matt Thomason	3,268
Castleford Tigers	26 – 22	Wakefield Trinity Wildcats	7 September, 15:30 GMT	Wish Communications Stadium	George Stokes	9,182

=== Round 27 ===
Home	Score	Away	Match Information
Home	Score	Away	Date and Time	Venue	Referee	Attendance
Wigan Warriors	24 – 20	Warrington Wolves	11 September, 20:00 GMT	DW Stadium	Phil Bentham	15,656
Hull F.C.	24 – 19	Leeds Rhinos	12 September, 20:00 GMT	Kingston Communications Stadium	Tim Roby	11,964
Salford Red Devils	36 – 6	Widnes Vikings	12 September, 20:00 GMT	AJ Bell Stadium	James Child	3,268
Huddersfield Giants	17 – 16	St Helens R.F.C.	12 September, 20:00 GMT	John Smith's Stadium	Richard Silverwood	7,244
London Broncos	36 – 46	Bradford Bulls	13 September, 15:00 GMT	The Hive Stadium	Joe Cobb	1,402
Catalans Dragons	28 – 6	Castleford Tigers	13 September, 18:00 GMT / 19:00 CET	Stade Gilbert Brutus	Ben Thaler	9,223
Wakefield Trinity Wildcats	18 – 42	Hull Kingston Rovers	14 September, 15:00 GMT	The Rapid Solicitors Stadium	Robert Hicks	4,481

- Wigan's win over Warrington was their first victory against the Wolves, at the DW Stadium, in 5 years.
- Hull FC's Richard Horne made his final career appearance. He finished his career that spanned 16 years and produced 387 appearances all for the Black and Whites.
- Leeds' Ryan Hall scored his 200th career try in his team's defeat against Hull FC.
- Had Castleford won the League Leaders' Shield, it would be the first time that they finished on top of the table at season's end in 88 years.

== Progression Table ==
- Teams are listed in order of where they finished on the table
- Numbers highlighted in green indicate that the team finished the round inside the top 8
- Numbers highlighted in blue indicates the team finished first on the ladder in that round
- Numbers highlighted in red indicates the team finished last place on the ladder in that round
- Underlined numbers indicate that the team had a bye during that round (*2=Wigan vs. Widnes catchup game)

Team	1	2	3	4	5	6	7	8	9	10	11	12	13	14	15	16	*2	17	18	19	20	21	22	23	24	25	26	27
St Helens R.F.C.	2	4	6	8	10	12	14	16	16	16	18	20	20	22	24	24	24	26	28	28	30	32	34	34	36	38	38	38
Wigan Warriors	0	0	2	2	4	6	8	10	12	14	14	16	18	20	20	22	24	24	24	26	28	30	30	32	33	33	35	37
Huddersfield Giants	2	3	3	4	6	6	6	6	8	10	12	14	16	16	18	20	20	22	24	24	24	26	28	30	32	33	35	37
Castleford Tigers	2	4	6	8	10	10	12	12	14	16	16	16	18	20	22	22	22	22	24	26	28	29	30	32	32	34	36	36
Warrington Wolves	0	0	2	4	6	6	8	8	10	10	10	12	14	16	18	20	20	22	24	26	28	28	28	30	32	33	35	35
Leeds Rhinos	2	4	6	7	9	11	11	13	15	17	19	21	21	23	23	23	23	25	27	27	29	30	32	32	32	32	32	32
Catalans Dragons	0	0	0	0	0	2	2	4	6	8	10	10	12	14	15	17	17	19	19	21	21	23	23	23	23	25	27	29
Widnes Vikings	2	2	4	6	6	8	10	10	10	12	14	14	16	16	17	17	17	17	19	19	19	21	21	23	23	25	27	27
Hull Kingston Rovers	0	1	1	1	1	3	5	7	9	9	9	10	12	14	14	14	14	16	16	18	18	18	20	20	21	21	21	23
Salford Red Devils	2	4	4	4	4	6	6	8	8	8	8	9	9	9	9	11	11	11	11	13	15	17	17	17	19	19	21	23
Hull F.C.	2	2	2	4	4	4	6	8	8	10	10	10	10	10	12	14	14	14	15	15	15	15	16	18	18	20	20	22
Wakefield Trinity Wildcats	0	0	0	2	4	4	4	4	4	4	6	8	8	8	8	10	10	12	13	15	17	17	19	19	19	21	21	21
Bradford Bulls^{E}	0	0	-2	-2	-2	-2	-2	-2	-2	-2	0	0	0	0	2	2	2	2	2	2	2	2	4	6	8	8	8	10
London Broncos	0	0	0	0	0	0	0	0	0	0	0	0	0	0	0	0	0	0	0	0	0	0	0	0	2	2	2	2

== End of Regular Season Table ==
As of 14 September 2014

Super League XIX
#	Team	Pld	W	D	L	PF	PA	PD	Pts
1	St Helens R.F.C.	27	19	0	8	796	563	+233	38
2	Wigan Warriors	27	18	1	8	834	429	+405	37
3	Huddersfield Giants	27	17	3	7	785	626	+159	37
4	Castleford Tigers	27	17	2	8	814	583	+231	36
5	Warrington Wolves	27	17	1	9	793	515	+278	35
6	Leeds Rhinos	27	15	2	10	685	421	+264	32
7	Catalans Dragons	27	14	1	12	733	667	+66	29
8	Widnes Vikings	27	13	1	13	611	725	-114	27
9	Hull Kingston Rovers	27	10	3	14	627	665	-38	23
10	Salford Red Devils	27	11	1	15	608	695	-87	23
11	Hull F.C.	27	10	2	15	653	586	+67	22
12	Wakefield Trinity Wildcats	27	10	1	16	557	750	-193	21
13	Bradford Bulls	27	8	0	19	512	984	-472	10*
14	London Broncos	27	1	0	26	438	1237	-799	2

* - Bradford Bulls deducted 6 points on 25 February 2014 for entering administration

- St Helens won their fifth League Leaders' Shield

== Play-offs ==
The 2014 Super League play-offs took place during September and October 2014 and consisted of the top eight teams of the regular season.

=== Format ===
Super League has used a play-off system since Super League III in 1998. When introduced, 5 teams qualified for the play-offs, which was subsequently expanded to 6 teams in 2002. The 2014 season will follow the same format that has been used since the 2009 season, which consists of an 8-team play-off.

The winning team from week one with the highest league placing will be allowed to select their opponents for week three in the Club Call. Except for the Club-Call, the current play-off format follows the play-off system of the Australian Football League.

=== Week 1 ===
Home	Score	Away	Match Information
Home	Score	Away	Date and Time	Venue	Referee	Attendance
Qualifying Play-offs
Wigan Warriors	57 – 4	Huddersfield Giants	18 September 2014, 20:00 BST	DW Stadium	Richard Silverwood	8,562
St Helens R.F.C.	41 – 0	Castleford Tigers	19 September 2014, 20:00 BST	Langtree Park	James Child	7,458
Elimination Play-offs
Warrington Wolves	22 – 19	Widnes Vikings	20 September 2014, 14:45 BST	Halliwell Jones Stadium	Ben Thaler	7,229
Leeds Rhinos	20 – 24	Catalans Dragons	20 September 2014, 17:15 BST	Headingley Carnegie Stadium	Phil Bentham	7,112
Progress to Qualifying Semi-Final: Wigan Warriors, St Helens; Progress to Preliminary Semi-Final: Huddersfield Giants, Castleford Tigers, Warrington Wolves, Catalans Dragons; Eliminated: Widnes Vikings, Leeds Rhinos: Huddersfields' defeat is their 10th in 13 play-off matches.; St Helens' Thomas Makinson made his 100th career appearance.; The Dragons finally won at the Headingley Carnegie Stadium on their 10th attempt.

=== Week 2 ===
Home	Score	Away	Match Information
Home	Score	Away	Date and Time	Venue	Referee	Attendance
Preliminary Semi-Final
Castleford Tigers	14 – 30	Warrington Wolves	25 September 2014, 20:00 BST	Wish Communications Stadium	Phil Bentham	6,219
Huddersfield Giants	16 – 18	Catalans Dragons	26 September 2014, 20:00 BST	John Smith's Stadium	James Child	6,900
Progress to Qualifying Semi-Final: Warrington Wolves, Catalans Dragons; Eliminated: Castleford Tigers, Huddersfield Giants: Huddersfield's defeat means that they have only won 3 out of 14 play-off games that they've played in.

=== Week 3 ===
Home	Score	Away	Match Information
Home	Score	Away	Date and Time	Venue	Referee	Attendance
Qualifying Semi-Final
St Helens R.F.C.	30 – 12	Catalans Dragons^{F}	2 October 2014, 20:00 BST	Langtree Park	Richard Silverwood	8,888
Wigan Warriors	16 – 12	Warrington Wolves	3 October 2014, 20:00 BST	DW Stadium	Phil Bentham	15,023
Progress to 2014 Super League Grand Final: St Helens, Wigan Warriors; Eliminated: Catalans Dragons, Warrington Wolves: St Helens' victory means that they make their 10th Grand Final appearance in the modern Super League era. The last time they won a final was back in 2006.

=== Week 4 ===
Home	Score	Away	Match Information
Home	Score	Away	Date and Time	Venue	Referee	Attendance
Grand Final
St Helens R.F.C.	14 – 6	Wigan Warriors	11 October 2014, 18:00 BST	Old Trafford, Manchester	Phil Bentham	70,102

== Notes ==
- A. Game rescheduled due to Wigan's involvement in the 2014 World Club Challenge.
- B. The 2014 Magic Weekend set record breaking numbers, making it the most successful Super League Magic Weekend ever.
- C. It is believed the Day 1 Magic Weekend figure of 36,399 would have been bigger if it weren't for the FA Cup Final being played on the same day. The Humber Derby fixture between Hull Kingston Rovers and Hull F.C. is the hottest ticket in the city of Hull, but due to Hull City being in action in the biggest football cup final in England, the attendance figure was lower than it could have been.
- D.The total attendance of 64,552 is the biggest ever attendance for the Magic Weekend event.
- E.Bradford Bulls were deducted 6 points on 25 February 2014 (end of round 2) for entering administration.
- F.St Helens opt to play against the Dragons courtesy of the club call.

== See also ==
- Super League XIX
- Super League play-offs
