= 2013 Super League season results =

Rugby league competition results

This is a list of the 2013 Super League season results. Super League is the top-flight rugby league competition in the United Kingdom and France. The 2013 season starts on 1 February and ends on 5 October with the 2013 Super League Grand Final at Old Trafford. The Magic Weekend was scheduled over the weekend of 25 and 26 May and would be played at the Etihad Stadium in Manchester for the second time, the ground having been used for the 2012 season.

The 2013 Super League season consists of two stages. The regular season is played over 27 round-robin fixtures, in which each of the fourteen teams involved in the competition played each other once at home and once away, as well as their Magic Weekend fixtures played over the sixteenth round of the season. In Super League XVIII, a win was worth two points in the table, a draw worth one point apiece, and a loss yielded no points.

The league leaders at the end of the regular season, will receive the League Leaders' Shield, but the Championship will be decided through the second stage of the season—the play-offs. The top eight teams in the table contest to play in the 2013 Super League Grand Final, the winners of which will be crowned Super League XVIII Champions.

== Regular season ==
=== Round 1 ===
Home	Score	Away	Match Information
Home	Score	Away	Date and Time	Venue	Referee	Attendance
Leeds Rhinos	36 – 6	Hull F.C.	1 February, 20:00 GMT	Headingley Carnegie Stadium	Steve Ganson	15,297
Salford City Reds	0 – 42	Wigan Warriors	1 February, 20:00 GMT	Salford City Stadium	James Child	5,383
St Helens R.F.C.	4 – 40	Huddersfield Giants	2 February, 16:45 GMT	Langtree Park	Richard Silverwood	12,003
Bradford Bulls	40 – 6	Wakefield Trinity Wildcats	3 February, 15:00 GMT	Provident Stadium	Ben Thaler	10,263
Hull Kingston Rovers	24 – 32	Catalans Dragons	3 February, 15:00 GMT	MS3 Craven Park	Phil Bentham	7,864
London Broncos	14 – 28	Widnes Vikings	3 February, 15:00 GMT	Twickenham Stoop	Tim Roby	2,856
Warrington Wolves	40 – 24	Castleford Tigers	3 February, 15:00 GMT	Halliwell Jones Stadium	Robert Hicks	10,721

=== Round 2 ===
Home	Score	Away	Match Information
Home	Score	Away	Date and Time	Venue	Referee	Attendance
Wigan Warriors	17 – 17	Warrington Wolves	8 February, 20:00 GMT	DW Stadium	Phil Bentham	20,050
Catalans Dragons	40 – 6	Salford City Reds	9 February, 17:00 GMT / 18:00 CET	Stade Gilbert Brutus	Ben Thaler	6,872
Wakefield Trinity Wildcats	36 – 20	Hull Kingston Rovers	9 February, 17:45 GMT	The Rapid Solicitors Stadium	Steve Ganson	9,237
Huddersfield Giants	34 – 6	London Broncos	10 February, 15:00 GMT	John Smith's Stadium	Robert Hicks	5,273
Hull F.C.	28 – 12	Bradford Bulls	10 February, 15:00 GMT^{A}	KC Stadium	Richard Silverwood	10,952
Widnes Vikings	4 – 16	St Helens R.F.C.	10 February, 15:00 GMT	Stobart Stadium	James Child	8,322
Castleford Tigers	14 – 12	Leeds Rhinos	10 February, 15:30 GMT	Wish Communications Stadium	Tim Roby	9,103

=== Round 3 ===
Home	Score	Away	Match Information
Home	Score	Away	Date and Time	Venue	Referee	Attendance
Leeds Rhinos	42 – 14	Salford City Reds	15 February, 20:00 GMT	Headingley Carnegie Stadium	Robert Hicks	12,558
St Helens R.F.C.	22 – 22	Hull F.C.	15 February, 20:00 GMT	Langtree Park	Ben Thaler	11,257
Warrington Wolves	24 – 16	Catalans Dragons	15 February, 20:00 GMT	Halliwell Jones Stadium	Richard Silverwood	10,015
Huddersfield Giants	22 – 10	Wigan Warriors	16 February, 15:00 GMT^{B}	John Smith's Stadium	James Child	8,023
Bradford Bulls	38 – 12	Castleford Tigers	16 February, 16:45 GMT	Provident Stadium	Steve Ganson	7,724
Hull Kingston Rovers	44 – 18	Widnes Vikings	17 February, 15:00 GMT	MS3 Craven Park	Tim Roby	7,247
London Broncos	0 – 28	Wakefield Trinity Wildcats	17 February, 15:00 GMT	Twickenham Stoop	Phil Bentham	1,887

=== Round 4 ===
Home	Score	Away	Match Information
Home	Score	Away	Date and Time	Venue	Referee	Attendance
Bradford Bulls	10 – 36	St Helens R.F.C.	23 February, 14:00 GMT^{C}	Provident Stadium	Tim Roby	8,203
Hull F.C.	10 – 24	Warrington Wolves	23 February, 17:45 GMT	KC Stadium	Phil Bentham	10,712
Wigan Warriors	48 – 18	London Broncos	24 February, 15:00 GMT	DW Stadium	Robert Hicks	11,590
Castleford Tigers	17 – 17	Catalans Dragons	24 February, 15:30 GMT	Wish Communications Stadium	James Child	5,205
Wakefield Trinity Wildcats	16 – 18	Huddersfield Giants	24 February, 15:30 GMT	The Rapid Solicitors Stadium	Richard Silverwood	8,467
Salford City Reds	38 – 34	Hull Kingston Rovers	24 February, 18:15 GMT	Salford City Stadium	Thierry Alibert	1,989
Leeds Rhinos	38 – 28	Widnes Vikings	17 June, 19:45 BST^{D}	Headingley Carnegie Stadium	Phil Bentham	12,782

=== Round 5 ===
Home	Score	Away	Match Information
Home	Score	Away	Date and Time	Venue	Referee	Attendance
Salford City Reds	4 – 36	London Broncos	1 March, 20:00 GMT	Salford City Stadium	Ben Thaler	2,333
St Helens R.F.C.	12 – 20	Leeds Rhinos	1 March, 20:00 GMT	Langtree Park	Phil Bentham	12,228
Catalans Dragons	29 – 22	Wakefield Trinity Wildcats	2 March, 17:00 GMT / 18:00 CET	Stade Gilbert Brutus	Steve Ganson	7,191
Widnes Vikings	36 – 16	Hull F.C.	2 March, 17:45 GMT	Stobart Stadium	Richard Silverwood	5,541
Huddersfield Giants	18 – 43	Bradford Bulls	3 March, 15:00 GMT	John Smith's Stadium	James Child	7,616
Hull Kingston Rovers	26 – 12	Warrington Wolves	3 March, 15:00 GMT	MS3 Craven Park	Robert Hicks	7,446
Castleford Tigers	22 – 28	Wigan Warriors	3 March, 15:30 GMT	Wish Communications Stadium	Thierry Alibert	7,852

=== Round 6 ===
Home	Score	Away	Match Information
Home	Score	Away	Date and Time	Venue	Referee	Attendance
Hull F.C.	52 – 0	Castleford Tigers	8 March, 20:00 GMT	KC Stadium	Steve Ganson	11,852
Leeds Rhinos	8 – 32	Huddersfield Giants	8 March, 20:00 GMT	Headingley Carnegie Stadium	Ben Thaler	15,013
Warrington Wolves	10 – 22	St Helens R.F.C.	8 March, 20:00 GMT	Halliwell Jones Stadium	Richard Silverwood	13,381
Widnes Vikings	22 – 22	Bradford Bulls	8 March, 20:00 GMT	Stobart Stadium	Robert Hicks	5,861
Wigan Warriors	38 – 0	Catalans Dragons	8 March, 20:00 GMT	DW Stadium	Phil Bentham	12,149
London Broncos	22 – 42	Hull Kingston Rovers	9 March, 18:15 GMT	Twickenham Stoop	James Child	1,837
Wakefield Trinity Wildcats	23 – 23	Salford City Reds	10 March, 15:30 GMT	The Rapid Solicitors Stadium	Thierry Alibert	6,986

=== Round 7 ===
Home	Score	Away	Match Information
Home	Score	Away	Date and Time	Venue	Referee	Attendance
Leeds Rhinos	18 – 14	Wigan Warriors	15 March, 20:00 GMT	Headingley Carnegie Stadium	Richard Silverwood	15,224
Salford City Reds	4 – 46	Warrington Wolves	15 March, 20:00 GMT	Salford City Stadium	Steve Ganson	3,932
St Helens R.F.C.	52 – 18	Wakefield Trinity Wildcats	15 March, 20:00 GMT	Langtree Park	Robert Hicks	12,105
Catalans Dragons	46 – 14	Widnes Vikings	16 March, 17:00 GMT / 18:00 CET	Stade Gilbert Brutus	James Child	7,557
Huddersfield Giants	24 – 10	Hull F.C.	16 March, 17:45 GMT	John Smith's Stadium	Phil Bentham	5,536
Bradford Bulls	34 – 12	Hull Kingston Rovers	17 March, 15:00 GMT	Twickenham Stoop	Ben Thaler	7,843
Castleford Tigers	12 – 26	London Broncos	17 March, 15:30 GMT	Wish Communications Stadium	Tim Roby	4,751

=== Round 8 ===
Home	Score	Away	Match Information
Home	Score	Away	Date and Time	Venue	Referee	Attendance
St Helens R.F.C.	14 – 10	Salford City Reds	22 March, 20:00 GMT	Langtree Park	Phil Bentham	5,348
Warrington Wolves	28 – 2	Huddersfield Giants	22 March, 20:00 GMT	Halliwell Jones Stadium	Ben Thaler	9,797
London Broncos	18 – 18	Hull F.C.	23 March, 15:00 GMT	Twickenham Stoop	Robert Hicks	1,865
Catalans Dragons	30 – 10	Bradford Bulls	23 March, 17:00 GMT / 18:00 CET	Stade Gilbert Brutus	Richard Silverwood	6,813
Wigan Warriors	62 – 4	Widnes Vikings	23 March, 17:45 GMT	DW Stadium	Tim Roby	11,904
Hull Kingston Rovers	26 – 22	Castleford Tigers	24 March, 18:15 GMT	MS3 Craven Park	James Child	6,489
Wakefield Trinity Wildcats	24 – 31	Leeds Rhinos	26 July, 20:00 BST ^{E}	The Rapid Solicitors Stadium	Ben Thaler	10,031

=== Round 9 ===
Home	Score	Away	Match Information
Home	Score	Away	Date and Time	Venue	Referee	Attendance
Leeds Rhinos	18 – 18	Bradford Bulls	28 March, 20:00 GMT	Headingley Carnegie Stadium	Phil Bentham	16,604
London Broncos	24 – 30	Catalans Dragons	28 March, 20:00 GMT	Molesey Road, Hersham^{F}	Tim Roby	1,136
Wigan Warriors	28 – 16	St Helens R.F.C.	29 March, 12:15 GMT	DW Stadium	Richard Silverwood	23,861
Hull F.C.	10 – 23	Hull Kingston Rovers	29 March, 14:45 GMT	KC Stadium	Steve Ganson	19,064
Salford City Reds	21 – 20	Huddersfield Giants	29 March, 15:00 GMT	Salford City Stadium	Robert Hicks	2,788
Widnes Vikings	38 – 22	Warrington Wolves	29 March, 15:00 GMT	Stobart Stadium	James Child	9,271
Castleford Tigers	16 – 37^{G}	Wakefield Trinity Wildcats	29 March, 20:00 GMT	Wish Communications Stadium	Ben Thaler	7,705

=== Round 10 ===
Home	Score	Away	Match Information
Home	Score	Away	Date and Time	Venue	Referee	Attendance
Bradford Bulls	36 – 24	Salford City Reds	1 April, 15:00 BST	Provident Stadium	Tim Roby	7,503
Huddersfield Giants	62 – 6	Widnes Vikings	1 April, 15:00 BST	John Smith's Stadium	Thierry Alibert	4,270
Hull Kingston Rovers	6 – 84	Wigan Warriors	1 April, 15:00 BST	MS3 Craven Park	Phil Bentham	7,894
St Helens R.F.C.	48 – 18	Castleford Tigers	1 April, 15:00 BST	Langtree Park	Robert Hicks	10,943
Warrington Wolves	54 – 20	London Broncos	1 April, 15:00 BST	Halliwell Jones Stadium	Richard Silverwood	9,681
Wakefield Trinity Wildcats	22 – 34	Hull F.C.	1 April, 15:30 BST	The Rapid Solicitors Stadium	James Child	8,126
Catalans Dragons	12 – 27	Leeds Rhinos	1 April, 17:15 BST / 18:15 CEST	Stade Gilbert Brutus	Ben Thaler	9,465

=== Round 11 ===
Home	Score	Away	Match Information
Home	Score	Away	Date and Time	Venue	Referee	Attendance
Castleford Tigers	24 – 40	Huddersfield Giants	6 April, 15:00 BST	Wish Communications Stadium	Phil Bentham	3,222
London Broncos	20 – 46	Bradford Bulls	6 April, 15:00 BST	Adams Park, High Wycombe^{H}	Thierry Alibert	1,441
Hull F.C.	28 – 8	Catalans Dragons	7 April, 15:00 BST	KC Stadium	Richard Silverwood	10,065
Hull Kingston Rovers	22 – 14	St Helens R.F.C.	7 April, 15:00 BST	MS3 Craven Park	Ben Thaler	7,616
Widnes Vikings	58 – 24	Salford City Reds	7 April, 15:00 BST	Stobart Stadium	Tim Roby	5,562
Wigan Warriors	44 – 24	Wakefield Trinity Wildcats	7 April, 15:00 BST	DW Stadium	Robert Hicks	12,152
Leeds Rhinos	28 – 22	Warrington Wolves	7 April, 18:45 BST	Headingley Carnegie Stadium	James Child	15,059

=== Round 12 ===
Home	Score	Away	Match Information
Home	Score	Away	Date and Time	Venue	Referee	Attendance
Leeds Rhinos	30 – 6	London Broncos	12 April, 20:00 BST	Headingley Carnegie Stadium	George Stokes	12,855
St Helens R.F.C.	12 – 22	Catalans Dragons	12 April, 20:00 BST	Langtree Park	Phil Bentham	11,111
Salford City Reds	18 – 24	Hull F.C.	13 April, 15:00 BST	Salford City Stadium	Robert Hicks	2,000
Castleford Tigers	28 – 26	Widnes Vikings	13 April, 16:45 BST	Wish Communications Stadium	Richard Silverwood	3,986
Bradford Bulls	6 – 36	Wigan Warriors	14 April, 15:00 BST	Provident Stadium	Tim Roby	9,899
Huddersfield Giants	50 – 30	Hull Kingston Rovers	14 April, 15:00 BST	John Smith's Stadium	Thierry Alibert	5,641
Wakefield Trinity Wildcats	34 – 41	Warrington Wolves	14 April, 15:00 BST	The Rapid Solicitors Stadium	Ben Thaler	7,985

=== Round 13 ===
Home	Score	Away	Match Information
Home	Score	Away	Date and Time	Venue	Referee	Attendance
Hull F.C.	20 – 28	Wigan Warriors	26 April, 20:00 BST	KC Stadium	Richard Silverwood	11,403
Widnes Vikings	26 – 28	Wakefield Trinity Wildcats	26 April, 20:00 BST	Stobart Stadium	Ben Thaler	5,405
London Broncos	21 – 14	St Helens R.F.C.	27 April, 13:00 BST	Twickenham Stoop	Tim Roby	2,839
Catalans Dragons	20 – 28	Huddersfield Giants	27 April, 17:00 BST / 18:00 CEST	Stade Gilbert Brutus	James Child	8,549
Salford City Reds	34 – 30	Castleford Tigers	27 April, 18:45 BST	Salford City Stadium	Thierry Alibert	2,306
Hull Kingston Rovers	10 – 44	Leeds Rhinos	28 April, 15:00 BST	MS3 Craven Park	Robert Hicks	8,122
Warrington Wolves	32 – 4	Bradford Bulls	28 April, 15:00 BST	Halliwell Jones Stadium	Phil Bentham	10,901

=== Round 14 ===
Home	Score	Away	Match Information
Home	Score	Away	Date and Time	Venue	Referee	Attendance
Bradford Bulls	22 – 42	Leeds Rhinos	3 May, 20:00 BST	Provident Stadium	Richard Silverwood	12,016
Hull F.C.	48 – 12	London Broncos	3 May, 20:00 BST	KC Stadium	Thierry Alibert	11,490
St Helens R.F.C.	28 – 35	Widnes Vikings	3 May, 20:00 BST	Langtree Park	Robert Hicks	11,438
Wigan Warriors	46 – 6	Salford City Reds	3 May, 20:00 BST	DW Stadium	James Child	12,489
Wakefield Trinity Wildcats	30 – 12	Catalans Dragons	4 May, 17:05 BST	The Rapid Solicitors Stadium	Phil Bentham	6,125
Huddersfield Giants	12 – 34	Warrington Wolves	5 May, 15:00 BST	John Smith's Stadium	Ben Thaler	8,585
Castleford Tigers	32 – 24	Hull Kingston Rovers	5 May, 15:30 BST	The Wish Communications Stadium	Tim Roby	6,474

=== Round 15 ===
Home	Score	Away	Match Information
Home	Score	Away	Date and Time	Venue	Referee	Attendance
Salford City Reds	7 – 28	Bradford Bulls	17 May, 20:00 BST	Salford City Stadium	Tim Roby	5,106
Warrington Wolves	16 – 26	Hull F.C.	17 May, 20:00 BST	Halliwell Jones Stadium	Richard Silverwood	9,387
Widnes Vikings	22 – 36	Huddersfield Giants	17 May, 20:00 BST	Stobart Stadium	Robert Hicks	5,173
London Broncos	6 – 64	Wigan Warriors	18 May, 15:00 BST	Twickenham Stoop	Thierry Alibert	3,594
Catalans Dragons	39 – 30	Castleford Tigers	18 May, 15:00 BST / 16:00 CEST	Stade Gilbert Brutus	Phil Bentham	7,083
Hull Kingston Rovers	44 – 18	Wakefield Trinity Wildcats	19 May, 15:00 BST	MS3 Craven Park	James Child	6,933
Leeds Rhinos	22 – 30	St Helens R.F.C.	20 May, 19:45 BST	Headingley Carnegie Stadium	Ben Thaler	15,998

=== Round 16 - Magic Weekend ===
Home	Score	Away	Match Information
Home	Score	Away	Date and Time	Venue	Referee	Attendance
Catalans Dragons	46 – 18	London Broncos	25 May, 12:00 BST	Etihad Stadium^{I}	Tim Roby	30,793
Castleford Tigers	49 – 24	Wakefield Trinity Wildcats	25 May, 14:15 BST	Etihad Stadium^{I}	Robert Hicks	30,793
Hull F.C.	22 – 16	Hull Kingston Rovers	25 May, 16:30 BST	Etihad Stadium^{I}	Ben Thaler	30,793
St Helens R.F.C.	22 – 48	Warrington Wolves	25 May, 18:45 BST	Etihad Stadium^{I}	Phil Bentham	30,793
Salford City Reds	28 – 22	Widnes Vikings	26 May, 15:00 BST	Etihad Stadium^{I}	Thierry Alibert	31,249
Bradford Bulls	6 – 42	Huddersfield Giants	26 May, 17:15 BST	Etihad Stadium^{I}	James Child	31,249
Leeds Rhinos	16 – 20	Wigan Warriors	26 May, 19:30 BST	Etihad Stadium^{I}	Richard Silverwood	31,249

=== Round 17 ===
Home	Score	Away	Match Information
Home	Score	Away	Date and Time	Venue	Referee	Attendance
Hull F.C.	18 – 6	Leeds Rhinos	31 May, 20:00 BST	KC Stadium	James Child	11,901
London Broncos	30 – 30	Castleford Tigers	1 June, 15:00 BST	Twickenham Stoop	Ben Thaler	1,810
Hull Kingston Rovers	28 – 18	Bradford Bulls	2 June, 15:00 BST	MS3 Craven Park	Robert Hicks	7,259
Warrington Wolves	68 – 10	Salford City Reds	2 June, 15:00 BST	Halliwell Jones Stadium	Tim Roby	9,560
Widnes Vikings	32 – 32	Catalans Dragons	2 June, 15:00 BST	Stobart Stadium	Phil Bentham	4,560
Wakefield Trinity Wildcats	23 – 36	Wigan Warriors	2 June, 15:30 BST	The Rapid Solicitiors Stadium	Thierry Alibert	8,459
Huddersfield Giants	25 – 16	St Helens R.F.C.	3 June, 19:45 BST	John Smith's Stadium	Richard Silverwood	5,203

=== Round 18 ===
Home	Score	Away	Match Information
Home	Score	Away	Date and Time	Venue	Referee	Attendance
Hull Kingston Rovers	35 – 28	Huddersfield Giants	7 June, 20:00 BST	MS3 Craven Park	Phil Bentham	6,963
Leeds Rhinos	42 – 24	Castleford Tigers	7 June, 20:00 BST	Headingley Carnegie Stadium	Tim Roby	17,035
Widnes Vikings	32 – 33	Wigan Warriors	7 June, 20:00 BST	Select Security Stadium^{J}	James Child	6,528
London Broncos	10 – 82	Warrington Wolves	8 June, 15:00 BST	Priestfield Stadium, Gillingham^{K}	Matt Thomason	3,041
Catalans Dragons	30 – 4	Hull F.C.	8 June, 17:00 BST / 18:00 CEST	Stade Gilbert Brutus	Richard Silverwood	8,105
St Helens R.F.C.	30 – 18	Bradford Bulls	9 June, 15:00 BST	Langtree Park	Thierry Alibert	11,358
Salford City Reds	10 – 46	Wakefield Trinity Wildcats	10 June, 19:45 BST	Salford City Stadium	Robert Hicks	2,327

=== Round 19 ===
Home	Score	Away	Match Information
Home	Score	Away	Date and Time	Venue	Referee	Attendance
Castleford Tigers	30 – 28	Hull F.C.	21 June, 20:00 BST	The Wish Communications Stadium	James Child	6,022
Salford City Reds	10 – 52	St Helens R.F.C.	21 June, 20:00 BST	Salford City Stadium	George Stokes	3,248
Catalans Dragons	21 – 22	Hull Kingston Rovers	22 June, 17:00 BST / 18:00 CEST	Stade Gilbert Brutus	Tim Roby	12,000
Bradford Bulls	28 – 32	Widnes Vikings	23 June, 15:00 BST	Provident Stadium	Robert Hicks	8,124
Huddersfield Giants	40 – 18	Leeds Rhinos	23 June, 15:00 BST	John Smith's Stadium	Richard Silverwood	7,756
Wakefield Trinity Wildcats	46 – 14	London Broncos	23 June, 15:30 BST	The Rapid Solicitors Stadium	Thierry Alibert	8,203
Warrington Wolves	22 – 12	Wigan Warriors	24 June, 19:45 BST	Halliwell Jones Stadium	Phil Bentham	14,028

=== Round 20 ===
Home	Score	Away	Match Information
Home	Score	Away	Date and Time	Venue	Referee	Attendance
Huddersfield Giants	60 – 16	Catalans Dragons	28 June, 20:00 BST	John Smith's Stadium	James Child	5,052
St Helens R.F.C.	12 – 24	Hull Kingston Rovers	28 June, 20:00 BST	Langtree Park	Robert Hicks	10,820
Wigan Warriors	4 – 18	Castleford Tigers	28 June, 20:00 BST	DW Stadium	Phil Bentham	12,463
London Broncos	30 – 44	Salford City Reds	29 June, 15:00 BST	Twickenham Stoop	Ben Thaler	2,079
Bradford Bulls	12 – 26	Warrington Wolves	30 June, 15:00 BST	Provident Stadium	Richard Silverwood	8,485
Widnes Vikings	36 – 52	Leeds Rhinos	30 June, 15:00 BST	The Select Security Stadium	Thierry Alibert	6,230
Hull F.C.	26 – 27	Wakefield Trinity Wildcats	1 July, 19:45 BST	KC Stadium	Tim Roby	10,000

=== Round 21 ===
Home	Score	Away	Match Information
Home	Score	Away	Date and Time	Venue	Referee	Attendance
Warrington Wolves	19 – 18	Leeds Rhinos	5 July, 20:00 BST	Halliwell Jones Stadium	Ben Thaler	11,281
Wigan Warriors	26 – 20	Bradford Bulls	5 July, 20:00 BST	DW Stadium	Tim Roby	13,213
Catalans Dragons	34 – 28	London Broncos	6 July, 17:00 BST / 18:00 CEST	Stade Gilbert Brutus	Robert Hicks	6,286
Hull F.C.	16 – 22	Huddersfield Giants	7 July, 15:00 BST	KC Stadium	Phil Bentham	10,986
Hull Kingston Rovers	28 – 18	Salford City Reds	7 July, 15:00 BST	MS3 Craven Park	Thierry Alibert	6,974
Castleford Tigers	24 – 40	St Helens R.F.C.	7 July, 15:30 BST	The Wish Communications Stadium	George Stokes	8,229
Wakefield Trinity Wildcats	24 – 14	Widnes Vikings	8 July, 19:45 BST	The Rapid Solicitors Stadium	Richard Silverwood	7,543

=== Round 22 ===
Home	Score	Away	Match Information
Home	Score	Away	Date and Time	Venue	Referee	Attendance
Bradford Bulls	19 – 12	Hull F.C.	19 July, 20:00 BST	Provident Stadium	Ben Thaler	7,904
Leeds Rhinos	20 – 18	Wakefield Trinity Wildcats	19 July, 20:00 BST	Headingley Carnegie Stadium	Phil Bentham	18,387
Salford City Reds	16 – 12	Catalans Dragons	19 July, 20:00 BST	Salford City Stadium	Thierry Alibert	2,200
Widnes Vikings	38 – 12	London Broncos	19 July, 20:00 BST	The Select Security Stadium	Robert Hicks	4,870
Huddersfield Giants	48 – 32	Castleford Tigers	21 July, 15:00 BST	John Smith's Stadium	Richard Silverwood	5,733
Warrington Wolves	34 – 6	Hull Kingston Rovers	21 July, 15:00 BST	Halliwell Jones Stadium	Tim Roby	9,838
St Helens R.F.C.	22 – 16	Wigan Warriors	22 July, 19:45 BST	Langtree Park	James Child	14,204

=== Round 23 ===
Home	Score	Away	Match Information
Home	Score	Away	Date and Time	Venue	Referee	Attendance
London Broncos	18 – 30	Leeds Rhinos	1 August, 20:00 BST	Twickenham Stoop	Tim Roby	2,377
Hull F.C.	72 – 10	Widnes Vikings	2 August, 20:00 BST	KC Stadium	Phil Bentham	10,500
Wigan Warriors	21 – 16	Hull Kingston Rovers	2 August, 20:00 BST	DW Stadium	Richard Silverwood	12,194
Catalans Dragons	6 – 26	St Helens R.F.C.	3 August, 17:00 BST / 18:00 CEST	Stade Gilbert Brutus	Ben Thaler	8,582
Huddersfield Giants	46 – 4	Salford City Reds	4 August, 15:00 BST	John Smith's Stadium	George Stokes	5,345
Castleford Tigers	30 – 40	Warrington Wolves	4 August, 15:30 BST	The Wish Communications Stadium	Robert Hicks	5,980
Wakefield Trinity Wildcats	24 – 26	Bradford Bulls	4 August, 15:30 BST	The Rapid Solicitors Stadium	James Child	8,084

=== Round 24 ===
Home	Score	Away	Match Information
Home	Score	Away	Date and Time	Venue	Referee	Attendance
Salford City Reds	16 – 42	Leeds Rhinos	9 August, 20:00 BST	Salford City Stadium	George Stokes	3,235
St Helens R.F.C.	38 – 10	London Broncos	9 August, 20:00 BST	Langtree Park	Thierry Alibert	9,926
Wigan Warriors	12 – 30	Huddersfield Giants	9 August, 20:00 BST	DW Stadium	James Child	19,620
Warrington Wolves	26 – 14	Wakefield Trinity Wildcats	10 August, 15:00 BST	Halliwell Jones Stadium	Tim Roby	9,250
Hull Kingston Rovers	20 – 38	Hull F.C.	11 August, 14:15 BST	MS3 Craven Park	Ben Thaler	8,874
Bradford Bulls	22 – 23	Catalans Dragons	11 August, 15:00 BST	Provident Stadium	Phil Bentham	7,850
Widnes Vikings	38 – 42	Castleford Tigers	11 August, 15:00 BST	The Select Security Stadium	Richard Silverwood	5,155

=== Round 25 ===
Home	Score	Away	Match Information
Home	Score	Away	Date and Time	Venue	Referee	Attendance
Warrington Wolves	6 – 16	Widnes Vikings	15 August, 20:00 BST	Halliwell Jones Stadium	Phil Bentham	10,392
Hull F.C.	18 – 13	Salford City Reds	16 August, 20:00 BST	KC Stadium	Thierry Alibert	11,180
Leeds Rhinos	12 – 16	Hull Kingston Rovers	16 August, 20:00 BST	Headingley Carnegie Stadium	Richard Silverwood	14,868
London Broncos	12 – 26	Huddersfield Giants	17 August, 15:00 BST	Twickenham Stoop	George Stokes	2,013
Catalans Dragons	22 – 8	Wigan Warriors	17 August, 17:00 BST / 18:00 CEST	Stade Gilbert Brutus	Ben Thaler	8,968
Castleford Tigers	46 – 34	Bradford Bulls	18 August, 15:30 BST	The Wish Communications Stadium	Robert Hicks	6,633
Wakefield Trinity Wildcats	12 – 26	St Helens R.F.C.	18 August, 15:30 BST	The Rapid Solicitors Stadium	James Child	7,985

=== Round 26 ===
Home	Score	Away	Match Information
Home	Score	Away	Date and Time	Venue	Referee	Attendance
Leeds Rhinos	20 – 12	Catalans Dragons	30 August, 20:00 BST	Headingley Carnegie Stadium	Phil Bentham	15,576
St Helens R.F.C.	16 – 29	Warrington Wolves	30 August, 20:00 BST	Langtree Park	Richard Silverwood	14,715
Wigan Warriors	33 – 34	Hull F.C.	30 August, 20:00 BST	DW Stadium	James Child	12,417
Bradford Bulls	10 – 20	London Broncos	1 September, 15:00 BST	Provident Stadium	Robert Hicks	7,148
Widnes Vikings	36 – 22	Hull Kingston Rovers	1 September, 15:00 BST	The Select Security Stadium	Ben Thaler	5,713
Castleford Tigers	44 – 30	Salford City Reds	1 September, 15:30 BST	The Wish Communications Stadium	Chris Leatherbarrow	6,817
Huddersfield Giants	40 – 0	Wakefield Trinity Wildcats	1 September, 18:15 BST	John Smith's Stadium	Tim Roby	8,757

=== Round 27 ===
Home	Score	Away	Match Information
Home	Score	Away	Date and Time	Venue	Referee	Attendance
Wigan Warriors	6 – 20	Leeds Rhinos	5 September, 20:00 BST	DW Stadium	Richard Silverwood	14,982
Hull F.C.	12 – 38	St Helens R.F.C.	6 September, 20:00 BST	KC Stadium	James Child	11,250
Salford City Reds	4 – 24	Widnes Vikings	6 September, 20:00 BST	Salford City Stadium	Tim Roby	3,775
Catalans Dragons	12 – 14	Warrington Wolves	7 September, 17:00 BST / 18:00 CEST	Stade Gilbert Brutus	Phil Bentham	8,590
Bradford Bulls	58 – 6	Huddersfield Giants	7 September, 17:45 BST	Provident Stadium	Ben Thaler	8,348
Hull Kingston Rovers	22 – 34	London Broncos	8 September, 15:00 BST	John Smith's Stadium	Chris Leatherbarrow	7,749
Wakefield Trinity Wildcats	36 – 32	Castleford Tigers	8 September, 15:30 BST	The Rapid Solicitors Stadium	Robert Hicks	6,404

== Play-offs ==
The 2013 Super League play-offs will take place during September and October 2013 and consists of the top eight teams of the regular season.

=== Format ===
Super League has used a play-off system since Super League III in 1998. When introduced, 5 teams qualified for the play-offs, which was subsequently expanded to 6 teams in 2002. The 2013 season will follow the same format that has been used since the 2009 season, which consists of an 8-team play-off.

The winning team from week one with the highest league placing will be allowed to select their opponents for week three in the Club Call. Except for the Club-Call, the current play-off format follows the play-off system of the Australian Football League.

=== Week 1 ===
Home	Score	Away	Match Information
Home	Score	Away	Date and Time	Venue	Referee	Attendance
Qualifying Play-offs
Huddersfield Giants	8 – 22	Wigan Warriors	12 September 2013, 20:00 BST	John Smith's Stadium	Phil Bentham	8,000
Warrington Wolves	40 – 20	Leeds Rhinos	14 September 2012, 15:00 BST	Halliwell Jones Stadium	James Child	8,695
Elimination Play-offs
Hull F.C.	14 – 4	Catalans Dragons	13 September 2013, 20:00 BST	KC Stadium	Ben Thaler	4,970
St Helens R.F.C.	46 – 10	Hull Kingston Rovers	14 September 2013, 17:00 BST	Langtree Park	Richard Silverwood	9,926
Progress to Qualifying Semi-Final: Warrington Wolves, Wigan Warriors; Progress to Preliminary Semi-Final: Huddersfield Giants, Hull FC, Leeds Rhinos, St Helens; Eliminated: Catalans Dragons, Hull KR

=== Week 2 ===
Home	Score	Away	Match Information
Home	Score	Away	Date and Time	Venue	Referee	Attendance
Preliminary Semi-Final
Huddersfield Giants	76 – 18	Hull F.C.	19 September 2013, 20:00 BST	John Smith's Stadium	Richard Silverwood	5,547
Leeds Rhinos	11 – 10	St Helens R.F.C.	20 September 2013, 20:00 BST	Headingley Carnegie Stadium	Phil Bentham	12,189
Progress to Qualifying Semi-Final: Huddersfield Giants, Leeds Rhinos; Eliminated: Hull FC, St Helens

=== Week 3 ===
Home	Score	Away	Match Information
Home	Score	Away	Date and Time	Venue	Referee	Attendance
Qualifying Semi-Final
Warrington Wolves	30 – 22	Huddersfield Giants	26 September 2013, 20:00 BST	Halliwell Jones Stadium	Richard Silverwood	10,042
Wigan Warriors	22 – 12	Leeds Rhinos	27 September 2013, 20:00 BST	DW Stadium	Phil Bentham	14,600
Progress to 2013 Super League Grand Final: Warrington Wolves, Wigan Warriors; Eliminated: Huddersfield Giants, Leeds Rhinos

=== Week 4 ===
Home	Score	Away	Match Information
Home	Score	Away	Date and Time	Venue	Referee	Attendance
Grand Final
Wigan Warriors	30 – 16	Warrington Wolves	5 October 2013, 18:00 BST	Old Trafford, Manchester	Richard Silverwood	66,281

== Notes ==
A. Game rescheduled from 8 February due to accident on M62 motorway
B. Game re-schuduled from 17 February due to Huddersfield Town's FA Cup 5th Round tie with Wigan Athletic
C. Game re-schuduled from 24 February due to Bradford City FC's involvement in the 2013 Football League Cup Final
D. Game rescheduled to 17 June 2013 due to Leeds Rhinos' involvement in the 2013 World Club Challenge
E. Game postponed on 22 March and 24 March due to snow
F. Game move to Esher RFC due to pitch at Twickenham Stoop being unplayable
G. Game abandoned after 73 minutes due to floodlight issues. Result needs to be ratified by Rugby Football League
H. Game move to Adams Park due to Harlequins's Heineken Cup quarter-final match against Munster on 7 April
I. All matches played at Etihad Stadium as part of Magic Weekend
J. Ground renamed from Stobart Stadium to Select Security Stadium from June 2013
K. Game moved to Gillingham F.C.'s Priestfield Stadium

== See also ==
- Super League XVIII
- Super League play-offs
