= 2012 Super League season results =

Rugby league competition results

This is a list of the 2012 Super League season results. Super League is the top-flight rugby league competition in the United Kingdom and France. The 2012 season started on 4 February and ended on 6 October with the 2012 Super League Grand Final at Old Trafford. The Magic Weekend was scheduled over the weekend of 26 and 27 May and was played at the Etihad Stadium in Manchester for the first time, having previously been played at the Millennium Stadium in Cardiff and Murrayfield Stadium in Edinburgh.

The 2012 Super League season consists of two stages. The regular season was played over 27 round-robin fixtures, in which each of the fourteen teams involved in the competition played each other once at home and once away, and their Magic Weekend fixtures played over the fifteenth round of the season. In Super League XVII, a win was worth two points in the table, a draw worth one point apiece, and a loss yielded no points.

The league leaders at the end of the regular season, Wigan Warriors, received the League Leaders' Shield, but the Championship will be decided through the second stage of the season—the play-offs. The top eight teams in the table contest to play in the 2012 Super League Grand Final, the winners of which will be crowned Super League XVII Champions.

== Regular season ==
=== Round 1 ===
Home	Score	Away	Match Information
Home	Score	Away	Date and Time	Venue	Referee	Attendance
Leeds Rhinos	34–16	Hull Kingston Rovers	3 February, 20:00 GMT	Headingley Carnegie Stadium	Phil Bentham	15,343
Widnes Vikings	14–32	Wakefield Trinity Wildcats	3 February, 20:00 GMT	Stobart Stadium	Ben Thaler	8,120
London Broncos	24–34	St Helens R.F.C.	4 February, 15:00 GMT	Twickenham Stoop	Robert Hicks	4,924
Salford City Reds	10–24	Castleford Tigers	4 February, 18:00 GMT	Salford City Stadium	Thierry Alibert	5,242
Bradford Bulls	12–34	Catalans Dragons	5 February, 15:00 GMT	Odsal Stadium	Jamie Child	10,610
Hull F.C.	20–20	Warrington Wolves	5 February, 15:00 GMT	KC Stadium	Steve Ganson	12,710
Wigan Warriors	16–20	Huddersfield Giants	5 February, 15:00 GMT	DW Stadium	Richard Silverwood	16,771

=== Round 2 ===
Home	Score	Away	Match Information
Home	Score	Away	Date and Time	Venue	Referee	Attendance
St Helens R.F.C.	38–10	Salford City Reds	10 February, 20:00 GMT	Langtree Park	Richard Silverwood	15,547
Wigan Warriors	20–6	Leeds Rhinos	11 February, 17:45 GMT	DW Stadium	Thierry Alibert	15,370
Huddersfield Giants	66–6	Widnes Vikings	12 February, 15:00 GMT	Galpharm Stadium	Steve Ganson	8,869
Warrington Wolves	50–10	London Broncos	12 February, 15:00 GMT	Halliwell Jones Stadium	Jamie Child	10,834
Castleford Tigers	12–20	Bradford Bulls	12 February, 15:30 GMT	Probiz Coliseum	Ben Thaler	8,054
Wakefield Trinity Wildcats	10–22	Hull Kingston Rovers	12 February, 15:30 GMT	The Rapid Solicitors Stadium	Robert Hicks	8,612
Catalans Dragons	44–14	Hull F.C.	14 July, 15:00 BST / 16:00 CEST^{A}	Stade Gilbert Brutus	Thierry Alibert	7,388

=== Round 3 ===
Home	Score	Away	Match Information
Home	Score	Away	Date and Time	Venue	Referee	Attendance
Catalans Dragons	28–20	Castleford Tigers	18 February, 14:30 GMT / 15:30 CET	Stade Gilbert Brutus	Tim Roby	7,488
Huddersfield Giants	22–32	Warrington Wolves	18 February, 16:45 GMT	Galpharm Stadium	Phil Bentham	8,184
Bradford Bulls	16–54	Wigan Warriors	19 February, 15:00 GMT	Odsal Stadium	Steve Ganson	12,909
Hull Kingston Rovers	36–36	St Helens R.F.C.	19 February, 15:00 GMT	MS3 Craven Park	Ben Thaler	7,610
Widnes Vikings	18–38	Salford City Reds	19 February, 15:00 GMT	Stobart Stadium	Jamie Child	5,053
Hull F.C.	22–14	London Broncos	19 February, 17:45 GMT	KC Stadium	Ben Thaler	10,096
Leeds Rhinos	44–40	Wakefield Trinity Wildcats	18 June, 20:00 BST ^{B}	Headingley Carnegie Stadium	Richard Silverwood	12,272

=== Round 4 ===
Home	Score	Away	Match Information
Home	Score	Away	Date and Time	Venue	Referee	Attendance
Salford City Reds	24–22	Hull F.C.	24 February, 20:00 GMT	Salford City Stadium	Phil Bentham	5,186
St Helens R.F.C.	32–34	Catalans Dragons	24 February, 20:00 GMT	Langtree Park	Jamie Child	13,108
Wakefield Trinity Wildcats	18–36	Bradford Bulls	25 February, 19:45 GMT	The Rapid Solicitors Stadium	Ben Thaler	6,934
London Broncos	16–30	Huddersfield Giants	26 February, 14:00 GMT	Twickenham Stoop	Tim Roby	1,970
Widnes Vikings	16–44	Leeds Rhinos	26 February, 14:00 GMT	Stobart Stadium	Steve Ganson	6,046
Warrington Wolves	42–10	Hull Kingston Rovers	26 February, 15:00 GMT	Halliwell Jones Stadium	Richard Silverwood	11,916
Castleford Tigers	4–46	Wigan Warriors	26 February, 15:30 GMT	Probiz Coliseum	Thierry Alibert	8,156

=== Round 5 ===
Home	Score	Away	Match Information
Home	Score	Away	Date and Time	Venue	Referee	Attendance
Castleford Tigers	14–36	Leeds Rhinos	2 March, 20:00 GMT	Probiz Coliseum	Jamie Child	9,237
Salford City Reds	44–12	London Broncos	2 March, 20:00 GMT	Salford City Stadium	Ben Thaler	5,250
Bradford Bulls	10–23	Warrington Wolves	3 March, 17:45 GMT	Odsal Stadium	Thierry Alibert	11,318
Huddersfield Giants	17–16	St Helens R.F.C.	4 March, 15:00 GMT	Galpharm Stadium	Phil Bentham	9,194
Hull F.C.	14–10	Wakefield Trinity Wildcats	5 March, 15:00 GMT	KC Stadium	Steve Ganson	11,105
Hull Kingston Rovers	36–0	Widnes Vikings	5 March, 15:00 GMT	MS3 Craven Park	Tim Roby	7,423
Wigan Warriors	36–12	Catalans Dragons	5 March, 15:00 GMT	DW Stadium	Richard Silverwood	14,464

=== Round 6 ===
Home	Score	Away	Match Information
Home	Score	Away	Date and Time	Venue	Referee	Attendance
Leeds Rhinos	26–18	Warrington Wolves	9 March, 20:00 GMT	Headingley Carnegie Stadium	Richard Silverwood	17,120
St Helens R.F.C.	10–22	Hull F.C.	9 March, 20:00 GMT	Langtree Park	Ben Thaler	14,875
Catalans Dragons	40–18	Salford City Reds	10 March, 14:30 GMT / 15:30 CET	Stade Gilbert Brutus	Thierry Alibert	8,158
London Broncos	42–16	Castleford Tigers	10 March, 15:00 GMT	Twickenham Stoop	Phil Bentham	2,381
Hull Kingston Rovers	24–36	Bradford Bulls	10 March, 17:05 GMT	MS3 Craven Park	Steve Ganson	7,486
Widnes Vikings	37–36	Wigan Warriors	11 March, 15:00 GMT	Stobart Stadium	Robert Hicks	7,357
Wakefield Trinity Wildcats	14–32	Huddersfield Giants	11 March, 15:30 GMT	The Rapid Solicitors Stadium	Jamie Child	8,794

=== Round 7 ===
Home	Score	Away	Match Information
Home	Score	Away	Date and Time	Venue	Referee	Attendance
Huddersfield Giants	42–4	Castleford Tigers	16 March, 20:00 GMT	Galpharm Stadium	Steve Ganson	6,928
Salford City Reds	16–56	Leeds Rhinos	16 March, 20:00 GMT	Salford City Stadium	Robert Hicks	6,891
Bradford Bulls	12–8	St Helens R.F.C.	17 March, 17:15 GMT	Odsal Stadium	Richard Silverwood	11,360
Catalans Dragons	20–12	Hull Kingston Rovers	17 March, 17:30 GMT / 18:30 CET	Stade Gilbert Brutus	Ben Thaler	7,337
Hull F.C.	58–10	Widnes Vikings	18 March, 15:00 GMT	KC Stadium	Phil Bentham	10,705
Warrington Wolves	32–30	Wakefield Trinity Wildcats	18 March, 15:00 GMT	Halliwell Jones Stadium	Thierry Alibert	10,686
Wigan Warriors	42–30	London Broncos	18 March, 15:00 GMT	DW Stadium	Jamie Child	12,608

=== Round 8 ===
Home	Score	Away	Match Information
Home	Score	Away	Date and Time	Venue	Referee	Attendance
Wigan Warriors	20–22	Warrington Wolves	23 March, 20:00 GMT	DW Stadium	Richard Silverwood	21,267
Bradford Bulls	18–38	Salford City Reds	25 March, 15:00 BST	Odsal Stadium	Ben Thaler	11,290
Hull Kingston Rovers	40–22	Huddersfield Giants	25 March, 15:00 BST	MS3 Craven Park	Steve Ganson	7,616
Widnes Vikings	38–30	London Broncos	25 March, 15:00 BST	Stobart Stadium	Richard Silverwood	5,635
Castleford Tigers	28–42	Hull F.C.	25 March, 15:30 BST	Probiz Coliseum	Matt Thomason	9,050
Wakefield Trinity Wildcats	32–22	Catalans Dragons	25 March, 15:30 BST	The Rapid Solicitors Stadium	Robert Hicks	7,254
St Helens R.F.C.	46–6	Leeds Rhinos	25 March, 18:35 BST	Langtree Park	Phil Bentham	15,199

=== Round 9 ===
Home	Score	Away	Match Information
Home	Score	Away	Date and Time	Venue	Referee	Attendance
Castleford Tigers	34–30	Hull Kingston Rovers	30 March, 20:00 BST	Probiz Coliseum	Robert Hicks	6,396
Hull F.C.	24–18	Bradford Bulls	30 March, 20:00 BST	KC Stadium	Thierry Alibert	11,673
Leeds Rhinos	12–22	Huddersfield Giants	30 March, 20:00 BST	Headingley Carnegie Stadium	Richard Silverwood	15,408
Salford City Reds	20–40	Wigan Warriors	30 March, 20:00 BST	Salford City Stadium	Jamie Child	6,774
Warrington Wolves	16–28	St Helens R.F.C.	30 March, 20:00 BST	Halliwell Jones Stadium	Ben Thaler	15,000
Catalans Dragons	76–6	Widnes Vikings	31 March, 17:30 BST / 18:30 CEST	Stade Gilbert Brutus	Phil Bentham	9,156
London Broncos	36–0	Wakefield Trinity Wildcats	31 March, 17:45 BST	Twickenham Stoop	Steve Ganson	2,268

=== Round 10 ===
Home	Score	Away	Match Information
Home	Score	Away	Date and Time	Venue	Referee	Attendance
London Broncos	18–36	Catalans Dragons	5 April, 20:00 BST	Twickenham Stoop	Thierry Alibert	1,829
Warrington Wolves	46–12	Widnes Vikings	5 April, 20:00 BST	Halliwell Jones Stadium	Jamie Child	12,042
Hull F.C.	36–6	Hull Kingston Rovers	6 April, 12:15 BST	KC Stadium	Richard Silverwood	18,979
St Helens R.F.C.	10–28	Wigan Warriors	6 April, 14:45 BST	Langtree Park	Phil Bentham	17,980
Huddersfield Giants	36–10	Salford City Reds	6 April, 15:00 BST	Galpharm Stadium	Robert Hicks	6,988
Wakefield Trinity Wildcats	16–34	Castleford Tigers	6 April, 19:30 BST	The Rapid Solicitors Stadium	Steve Ganson	9,786
Bradford Bulls	12–4	Leeds Rhinos	6 April, 20:00 BST	Odsal Stadium	Ben Thaler	20,851

=== Round 11 ===
Home	Score	Away	Match Information
Home	Score	Away	Date and Time	Venue	Referee	Attendance
Catalans Dragons	44–16	Warrington Wolves	9 April, 15:00 BST / 16:00 CEST	Stade Gilbert Brutus	Steve Ganson	11,500
Huddersfield Giants	22–4	Hull F.C.	9 April, 15:00 BST	Galpharm Stadium	Jamie Child	9,950
Leeds Rhinos	52–10	London Broncos	9 April, 15:00 BST	Headingley Carnegie Stadium	Robert Hicks	13,109
Salford City Reds	10–18	Hull Kingston Rovers	9 April, 15:00 BST	Salford City Stadium	Thierry Alibert	5,000
Widnes Vikings	4–38	Bradford Bulls	9 April, 15:00 BST	Stobart Stadium	Phil Bentham	5,687
Wigan Warriors	36–6	Wakefield Trinity Wildcats	9 April, 15:00 BST	DW Stadium	Ben Thaler	13,609
Castleford Tigers	12–18	St Helens R.F.C.	9 April, 15:30 BST	Probiz Coliseum	Richard Silverwood	6,492

=== Round 12 ===
Home	Score	Away	Match Information
Home	Score	Away	Date and Time	Venue	Referee	Attendance
Leeds Rhinos	34–18	Catalans Dragons	20 April, 20:00 BST	Headingley Carnegie Stadium	Ben Thaler	13,282
St Helens R.F.C.	62–0	Widnes Vikings	20 April, 20:00 BST	Langtree Park	Tim Roby	14,253
Wakefield Trinity Wildcats	26–22	Salford City Reds	21 April, 17:45 BST	The Rapid Solicitors Stadium	Phil Bentham	6,748
Bradford Bulls	6–20	Huddersfield Giants	22 April, 15:00 BST	Odsal Stadium	Thierry Alibert	11,182
Hull F.C.	12–56	Wigan Warriors	22 April, 15:00 BST	KC Stadium	Steve Ganson	11,549
Hull Kingston Rovers	44–16	London Broncos	22 April, 15:00 BST	MS3 Craven Park	Jamie Child	6,713
Warrington Wolves	54–6	Castleford Tigers	22 April, 15:00 BST	Halliwell Jones Stadium	Robert Hicks	10,590

=== Round 13 ===
Home	Score	Away	Match Information
Home	Score	Away	Date and Time	Venue	Referee	Attendance
St Helens R.F.C.	38–12	Wakefield Trinity Wildcats	4 May, 20:00 BST	Langtree Park	Thierry Alibert	13,177
Wigan Warriors	36–22	Hull Kingston Rovers	4 May, 20:00 BST	DW Stadium	Phil Bentham^{C}	14,457
Catalans Dragons	27–20	Huddersfield Giants	5 May, 17:30 BST / 18:30 CEST	Stade Gilbert Brutus	Richard Silverwood	10,684
Hull F.C.	34–20	Leeds Rhinos	5 May, 19:15 BST	KC Stadium	Jamie Child	11,677
London Broncos	22–29	Bradford Bulls	6 May, 14:00 BST	Brisbane Road^{D}	Robert Hicks	2,844
Warrington Wolves	24–20	Salford City Reds	6 May, 15:00 BST	Halliwell Jones Stadium	Ben Thaler	10,437
Castleford Tigers	36–12	Widnes Vikings	7 May, 14:05 BST	Probiz Coliseum	Steve Ganson	5,580

=== Round 14 ===
Home	Score	Away	Match Information
Home	Score	Away	Date and Time	Venue	Referee	Attendance
Huddersfield Giants	12–32	Wigan Warriors	18 May, 20:00 BST	Galpharm Stadium	Ben Thaler	10,123
Salford City Reds	20–20	Bradford Bulls	18 May, 20:00 BST	Salford City Stadium	Richard Silverwood	6,829
Hull Kingston Rovers	70–12	Castleford Tigers	20 May, 15:00 BST	MS3 Craven Park	James Child	7,312
London Broncos	12–14	Hull F.C.	20 May, 15:00 BST	Priestfield Stadium^{D}	Thierry Albert	3,930
Widnes Vikings	34–42	Catalans Dragons	20 May, 15:00 BST	Stobart Stadium	Robert Hicks	4,684
Wakefield Trinity Wildcats	12–42	Warrington Wolves	20 May, 15:30 BST	The Rapid Solicitors Stadium	Tim Roby	8,483
Leeds Rhinos	18–31	St Helens R.F.C.	21 May, 20:00 BST	Headingley Carnegie Stadium	Steve Ganson	15,343

=== Round 15 ===
Home	Score	Away	Match Information
Home	Score	Away	Date and Time	Venue	Referee	Attendance
Castleford Tigers	26–32	Wakefield Trinity Wildcats	26 May, 13:00 BST	Etihad Stadium^{E}	Robert Hicks	30,763
Warrington Wolves	68–4	Widnes Vikings	26 May, 16:00 BST	Etihad Stadium^{E}	George Stokes	30,763
Hull Kingston Rovers	32–30	Hull F.C.	26 May, 19:00 BST	Etihad Stadium^{E}	Steve Ganson	30,763
Catalans Dragons	42–18	London Broncos	27 May, 12:00 BST	Etihad Stadium^{E}	Jamie Child	32,953
Huddersfield Giants	34–38	Salford City Reds	27 May, 14:00 BST	Etihad Stadium^{E}	Tim Roby	32,953
Bradford Bulls	22–37	Leeds Rhinos	27 May, 16:00 BST	Etihad Stadium^{E}	Thierry Alibert	32,953
St Helens R.F.C.	16–42	Wigan Warriors	27 May, 18:00 BST	Etihad Stadium^{E}	Ben Thaler	32,953

=== Round 16 ===
Home	Score	Away	Match Information
Home	Score	Away	Date and Time	Venue	Referee	Attendance
Leeds Rhinos	8–50	Wigan Warriors	1 June, 20:00 BST	Headingley Carnegie Stadium	Jamie Child	16,113
Salford City Reds	34–30	Catalans Dragons	1 June, 20:00 BST	Salford City Stadium	Steve Ganson	5,841
Hull F.C.	18–18	St Helens R.F.C.	3 June, 15:00 BST	KC Stadium	Thierry Alibert	11,727
Hull Kingston Rovers	23–22	Warrington Wolves	3 June, 15:00 BST	MS3 Craven Park	Robert Hicks	7,661
Widnes Vikings	26–22	Huddersfield Giants	3 June, 15:00 BST	Stobart Stadium	George Stokes	4,644
Wakefield Trinity Wildcats	24–6	London Broncos	3 June, 15:30 BST	The Rapid Solicitors Stadium	Tim Roby	5,876
Bradford Bulls	46–32	Castleford Tigers	4 June, 20:00 BST	Odsal Stadium	Ben Thaler	10,906

=== Round 17 ===
Home	Score	Away	Match Information
Home	Score	Away	Date and Time	Venue	Referee	Attendance
St Helens R.F.C.	54–0	Bradford Bulls	8 June, 20:00 BST	Langtree Park	Tim Roby	13,025
Warrington Wolves	37–18	Leeds Rhinos	8 June, 20:00 BST	Halliwell Jones Stadium	Ben Thaler	10,835
Catalans Dragons	14–36	Wigan Warriors	9 June, 15:00 BST / 16:00 CEST	Stade Gilbert Brutus	Jamie Child	13,858
London Broncos	28–24	Widnes Vikings	9 June, 15:00 BST	Twickenham Stoop	Robert Hicks	2,117
Castleford Tigers	34–30	Salford City Reds	10 June, 15:30 BST	Probiz Coliseum	George Stokes	4,877
Wakefield Trinity Wildcats	32–30	Hull F.C.	10 June, 15:30 BST	The Rapid Solicitors Stadium	Steve Ganson	8,986
Huddersfield Giants	26–44	Hull Kingston Rovers	11 June, 20:00 BST	Galpharm Stadium	Thierry Alibert	4,962

=== Round 18 ===
Home	Score	Away	Match Information
Home	Score	Away	Date and Time	Venue	Referee	Attendance
Hull Kingston Rovers	10–13	Catalans Dragons	22 June, 20:00 BST	MS3 Craven Park	Richard Silverwood	7,142
Salford City Reds	10–32	St Helens R.F.C.	22 June, 20:00 BST	Salford City Stadium	Jamie Child	5,447
Bradford Bulls	34–26	Wakefield Trinity Wildcats	24 June, 15:00 BST	Odsal Stadium	Robert Hicks	11,236
Huddersfield Giants	46–10	London Broncos	24 June, 15:00 BST	Galpharm Stadium	Steve Ganson	6,019
Leeds Rhinos	40–22	Castleford Tigers	24 June, 15:00 BST	Headingley Carnegie Stadium	Tim Roby	16,153
Warrington Wolves	40–18	Hull F.C.	24 June, 15:00 BST	Halliwell Jones Stadium	Ben Thaler	10,582
Wigan Warriors	54–12	Widnes Vikings	25 June, 20:00 BST	DW Stadium	Theirry Alibert	13,445

=== Round 19 ===
Home	Score	Away	Match Information
Home	Score	Away	Date and Time	Venue	Referee	Attendance
Salford City Reds	48–24	Warrington Wolves	29 June, 20:00 BST	Salford City Stadium	Richard Silverwood	6,179
St Helens R.F.C.	34–28	Hull Kingston Rovers	29 June, 20:00 BST	Langtree Park	Thierry Alibert	12,435
Wigan Warriors	22–30	Bradford Bulls	29 June, 20:00 BST	DW Stadium	Tim Roby	19,628
London Broncos	12–58	Leeds Rhinos	30 June, 15:00 BST	Twickenham Stoop	Robert Hicks	3,628
Catalans Dragons	34–10	Wakefield Trinity Wildcats	30 June, 18:30 BST / 19:30 CEST	Stade Gilbert Brutus	Ben Thaler	8,842
Hull F.C.	28–24	Huddersfield Giants	1 July, 15:00 BST	KC Stadium	Jamie Child	11,142
Widnes Vikings	40–10	Castleford Tigers	2 July, 20:00 BST	Stobart Stadium	Steve Ganson	4,501

=== Round 20 ===
Home	Score	Away	Match Information
Home	Score	Away	Date and Time	Venue	Referee	Attendance
Leeds Rhinos	21–6	Hull F.C.	6 July, 20:00 BST	Headingley Carnegie Stadium	Tim Roby	13,250
Bradford Bulls	44–12	London Broncos	8 July, 15:00 BST	Odsal Stadium	Richard Silverwood	10,132
Hull Kingston Rovers	22–24	Salford City Reds	8 July, 15:00 BST	MS3 Craven Park	Steve Ganson	7,213
Widnes Vikings	23–24	St Helens R.F.C.	8 July, 15:00 BST	Stobart Stadium	Robert Hicks	7,023
Castleford Tigers	52–6	Huddersfield Giants	8 July, 15:30 BST	Probiz Coliseum	Ben Thaler	5,012
Wakefield Trinity Wildcats	10–52	Wigan Warriors	8 July, 15:30 BST	The Rapid Solicitors Stadium	Thierry Alibert	9,107
Warrington Wolves	15–6	Catalans Dragons	9 July, 20:00 BST	Halliwell Jones Stadium	Jamie Child	10,570

=== Round 21 ===
Home	Score	Away	Match Information
Home	Score	Away	Date and Time	Venue	Referee	Attendance
Catalans Dragons	15–20	St Helens R.F.C.	20 July, 20:00 BST / 21:00 CEST	Stade Gilbert Brutus	Ben Thaler	10,387
Leeds Rhinos	34–16	Bradford Bulls	20 July, 20:00 BST	Headingley Stadium	Steve Ganson	18,520
Salford City Reds	8–46	Widnes Vikings	20 July, 20:00 BST	Salford City Stadium	Jamie Child	5,196
London Broncos	6–44	Wigan Warriors	21 July, 15:00 BST	Twickenham Stoop	Thierry Alibert	4,309
Huddersfield Giants	14–35	Wakefield Trinity Wildcats	22 July, 15:00 BST	Galpharm Stadium	Tim Roby	6,579
Castleford Tigers	26–40	Warrington Wolves	22 July, 15:30 BST	Probiz Coliseum	Robert Hicks	6,167
Hull Kingston Rovers	18–32	Hull F.C.	23 July, 20:00 BST	MS3 Craven Park	Richard Silverwood	9,086

=== Round 22 ===
Home	Score	Away	Match Information
Home	Score	Away	Date and Time	Venue	Referee	Attendance
Wigan Warriors	40–16	Castleford Tigers	27 July, 20:00 BST	DW Stadium	George Stokes	13,975
Catalans Dragons	19–12	London Broncos	28 July, 17:00 BST / 18:00 CEST	Stade Gilbert Brutus	Tim Roby	7,662
Hull F.C.	34–26	Salford City Reds	29 July, 15:00 BST	KC Stadium	Robert Hicks	10,776
Warrington Wolves	50–22	Bradford Bulls	29 July, 15:00 BST	Halliwell Jones Stadium	Ben Thaler	10,750
Widnes Vikings	26–32	Hull Kingston Rovers	29 July, 15:00 BST	Stobart Stadium	Thierry Alibert	5,325
St Helens R.F.C.	46–12	Huddersfield Giants	29 July, 19:45 BST	Langtree Park	Jamie Child	14,070
Wakefield Trinity Wildcats	38–18	Leeds Rhinos	30 July, 20:00 BST	The Rapid Solicitors Stadium	Richard Silverwood	9,547

=== Round 23 ===
Home	Score	Away	Match Information
Home	Score	Away	Date and Time	Venue	Referee	Attendance
Wigan Warriors	48–10	Hull F.C.	3 August, 20:00 BST	DW Stadium	Jamie Child	17,736
London Broncos	40–28	Salford City Reds	4 August, 14:00 BST	Twickenham Stoop	George Stokes	1,517
Bradford Bulls	38–26	Widnes Vikings	5 August, 15:00 BST	Odsal Stadium	Steve Ganson	10,261
Huddersfield Giants	36–18	Catalans Dragons	5 August, 15:00 BST	John Smith's Stadium^{F}	Thierry Alibert	5,822
Hull Kingston Rovers	24–25	Leeds Rhinos	5 August, 15:00 BST	MS3 Craven Park	Tim Roby	8,379
Castleford Tigers	12–40	Wakefield Trinity Wildcats	5 August, 15:30 BST	Probiz Coliseum	Ben Thaler	7,050
St Helens R.F.C.	12–22	Warrington Wolves	6 August, 20:00 BST	Langtree Park	Richard Silverwood	15,728

=== Round 24 ===
Home	Score	Away	Match Information
Home	Score	Away	Date and Time	Venue	Referee	Attendance
Bradford Bulls	32–26	Hull Kingston Rovers	10 August, 20:00 BST	Odsal Stadium	Jamie Child	10,217
Leeds Rhinos	68–24	Widnes Vikings	10 August, 20:00 BST	Headingley Carnegie Stadium	George Stokes	13,326
Salford City Reds	20–30	Huddersfield Giants	10 August, 20:00 BST	Salford City Stadium	Ben Thaler	5,324
Warrington Wolves	30–10	Wigan Warriors	11 August, 16:45 BST	Halliwell Jones Stadium	Steve Ganson	13,859
Hull F.C.	30–10	Catalans Dragons	12 August, 15:00 BST	KC Stadium	Robert Hicks	10,765
Castleford Tigers	20–42	London Broncos	12 August, 15:30 BST	Probiz Coliseum	Richard Silverwood	5,149
Wakefield Trinity Wildcats	33–32	St Helens R.F.C.	12 August, 15:30 BST	The Rapid Solicitors Stadium	Thierry Alibert	7,876

=== Round 25 ===
Home	Score	Away	Match Information
Home	Score	Away	Date and Time	Venue	Referee	Attendance
London Broncos	62–18	Warrington Wolves	17 August, 20:00 BST	Twickenham Stoop	Ben Thaler	2,261
St Helens R.F.C.	44–12	Castleford Tigers	17 August, 20:00 BST	Langtree Park	George Stokes	12,224
Catalans Dragons	38–34	Leeds Rhinos	18 August, 16:45 BST / 17:45 CEST	Stade Gilbert Brutus	Jamie Child	10,269
Widnes Vikings	42–16	Hull F.C.	18 August, 18:15 BST	Stobart Stadium	Steve Ganson	5,008
Huddersfield Giants	12–34	Bradford Bulls	19 August, 15:00 BST	John Smith's Stadium^{F}	Thierry Alibert	7,477
Hull Kingston Rovers	30–31	Wakefield Trinity Wildcats	19 August, 15:00 BST	MS3 Craven Park	Richard Silverwood	8,726
Wigan Warriors	38–6	Salford City Reds	20 August, 20:00 BST	DW Stadium	Tim Roby	13,703

=== Round 26 ===
Home	Score	Away	Match Information
Home	Score	Away	Date and Time	Venue	Referee	Attendance
Leeds Rhinos	46–12	Salford City Reds	31 August, 20:00 BST	Headingley Carnegie Stadium	Robert Hicks	15,081
St Helens R.F.C.	30–0	London Broncos	31 August, 20:00 BST	Langtree Park	Richard Silverwood	13,262
Bradford Bulls	6–70	Hull F.C.	1 September, 19:00 BST	Odsal Stadium	Ben Thaler	10,616
Castleford Tigers	26–46	Catalans Dragons	2 September, 15:00 BST	Probiz Coliseum	Tim Roby	5,005
Hull Kingston Rovers	36–42	Wigan Warriors	2 September, 15:00 BST	MS3 Craven Park	Thierry Alibert	8,845
Warrington Wolves	54–6	Huddersfield Giants	2 September, 15:00 BST	Halliwell Jones Stadium	George Stokes	10,550
Wakefield Trinity Wildcats	22–18	Widnes Vikings	2 September, 18:45 BST	The Rapid Solicitors Stadium	Jamie Child	8,234

=== Round 27 ===
Home	Score	Away	Match Information
Home	Score	Away	Date and Time	Venue	Referee	Attendance
Wigan Warriors	18–26	St Helens R.F.C.	7 September, 20:00 BST	DW Stadium	James Child	21,522
London Broncos	48–42	Hull Kingston Rovers	8 September, 13:00 BST	Twickenham Stoop	Tim Roby	2,525
Catalans Dragons	50–26	Bradford Bulls	8 September, 15:00 BST / 16:00 CEST	Stade Gilbert Brutus	Richard Silverwood	9,254
Hull F.C.	36–10	Castleford Tigers	8 September, 18:00 BST	KC Stadium	Rob Hicks	11,607
Salford City Reds	34–42	Wakefield Trinity Wildcats	8 September, 18:15 BST	Leigh Sports Village^{G}	Ben Thaler	2,380
Huddersfield Giants	48–24	Leeds Rhinos	9 September, 15:00 BST	John Smith's Stadium^{F}	Thierry Alibert	9,128
Widnes Vikings	14–52	Warrington Wolves	9 September, 15:00 BST	Stobart Stadium	Steve Ganson	8,617

== Play-offs ==
The 2012 Super League play-offs take place during September and October 2012 and consists of the top eight teams of the regular season.

=== Format ===
Super League has used a play-off system since Super League III in 1998. When introduced, 5 teams qualified for the play-offs, which was subsequently expanded to 6 teams in 2002. The 2012 season will follow the same format that has been used since the 2009 season, which consists of an 8-team play-off.

The winning team from week one with the highest league placing will be allowed to select their opponents for week three in the Club Call. Except for the Club-Call, the current play-off format follows the play-off system of the Australian Football League.

=== Week 1 ===
Home	Score	Away	Match Information
Home	Score	Away	Date and Time	Venue	Referee	Attendance
Qualifying Play-offs
Wigan Warriors	46–6	Catalans Dragons	14 September 2012, 20:00 BST	DW Stadium	Richard Silverwood	7,232
Warrington Wolves	6–28	St Helens R.F.C.	15 September 2012, 18:00 BST	Halliwell Jones Stadium	Ben Thaler	10,190
Elimination Play-offs
Leeds Rhinos	42–20	Wakefield Trinity Wildcats	15 September 2012, 20:00 BST	Headingley Carnegie Stadium	Steve Ganson	9,044
Hull F.C.	46–10	Huddersfield Giants	16 September 2012, 18:00 BST	KC Stadium	Jamie Child	8,662
Progress to Qualifying Semi-final: St Helens, Wigan Warriors; Progress to Preliminary Semi-final: Catalans Dragons, Hull FC, Leeds Rhinos, Warrington Wolves; Eliminated: Huddersfield Giants, Wakefield Trinity Wildcats

=== Week 2 ===
Home	Score	Away	Match Information
Home	Score	Away	Date and Time	Venue	Referee	Attendance
Preliminary Semi-final
Catalans Dragons	20–27	Leeds Rhinos	21 September 2012, 20:45 CEST	Stade Gilbert Brutus	Ben Thaler	11,523
Warrington Wolves	24–12	Hull F.C.	22 September 2012, 18:45 BST	Halliwell Jones Stadium	Richard Silverwood	7,323
Progress to Qualifying Semi-final: Leeds Rhinos, Warrington Wolves; Eliminated: Catalans Dragons, Hull FC

- The Preliminary Semi-finals fixtures were determined by the team's league positions, with the two highest-placed teams (the two losing teams from the qualifying play-offs) taking on the two lowest-placed teams (the two winners from the Elimination play-offs).
- Warrington Wolves, as the highest-placed team faced the lowest-placed team, Hull FC, leaving Catalans Dragons at home to Leeds Rhinos

=== Week 3 ===
Home	Score	Away	Match Information
Home	Score	Away	Date and Time	Venue	Referee	Attendance
Qualifying Semi-final
Wigan Warriors	12–13	Leeds Rhinos	28 September 2012, 20:00 BST	DW Stadium	Richard Silverwood	8,235
St Helens R.F.C.	18–36	Warrington Wolves	29 September 2012, 18:15 BST	Langtree Park	Ben Thaler	12,715
Progress to 2012 Super League Grand Final: Leeds Rhinos, Warrington Wolves; Eliminated: St Helens, Wigan Warriors

- Wigan Warriors, as the highest ranked team in the qualifying Semi-final (a combination of league leaders and qualifying play-off winner), got to choose their semi-final opponents from the two winners of the Preliminary Semi-finals in the Club Call, which was made on 23 September 2012 at 12:30 BST on Sky Sports News, where they chose Leeds Rhinos.
- St Helens, the second highest ranked team in the Semi-finals, faced the other Preliminary Semi-final winner, Warrington Wolves.
- Wigan and St Helens, as the highest ranked teams, had home advantage in their semi finals.

=== Week 4 ===
Home	Score	Away	Match Information
Home	Score	Away	Date and Time	Venue	Referee	Attendance
Grand Final
Leeds Rhinos	26–18	Warrington Wolves	6 October 2012, 18:00 BST	Old Trafford, Manchester	Richard Silverwood	70,676

- Warrington became only the 6th team to play in the Super League Grand Final.
- This marked the first time that a Grand Final featured the same two teams that played in that year's Challenge Cup final.

== Notes ==
A. Match originally postponed due to frozen pitch
B. Game rescheduled to 18 June 2012 due to Leeds Rhinos' involvement in the 2012 World Club Challenge
C. Replaced by Robert Hicks during first half due to injury
D. Match switch as part of London Broncos's On The Road campaign
E. All matches played at Etihad Stadium as part of Magic Weekend
F. Galpharm Stadium renamed John Smith's Stadium as of 1 August 2012
G. Game switched to Leigh Sports Village due to fixture clash with co-tenants Sale Sharks

== See also ==
- Super League XVII
- Super League play-offs
