= Magic Weekend =

Rugby league weekend where all fixtures are played at one venue

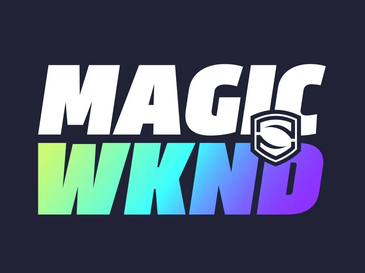
The logo used from 2026 onwards.

The Magic Weekend (stylised as Magic WKND) is an annual event organised by the Rugby Football League in which an entire round of Super League matches is played over a weekend at a single stadium to promote the sport of rugby league.

The event took place at the Millennium Stadium in Cardiff in 2007 and 2008, and again in 2011. Subsequent events have taken place at Murrayfield Stadium in Edinburgh, from 2009 to 2010, the Etihad Stadium, Manchester, from 2012 to 2014, St James' Park, Newcastle, from 2015 to 2018, Anfield, Liverpool in 2019, before a return to Newcastle between 2021 and 2023. Elland Road in Leeds hosted it for the first time in the 2024 season, before a third return to Newcastle in 2025. Magic Weekend returned to Liverpool in 2026, but was hosted at Everton's Hill Dickinson Stadium.

Having established itself on the English rugby league calendar, the Magic Weekend formula has now been copied in other rugby league-playing nations: starting in France in 2017, and then in Australia, with the Magic Round in 2019.

== History ==
=== 2007–2008: Cardiff ===
The first Millennium Magic round was confirmed in September 2006 for the weekend of 5–6 May 2007. Richard Lewis, chairman of the RFL, cited both expansion and monetary reasons for the move to Wales, but the plan also allowed the Super League to be reduced by one round (critics had stated that the players were put under too much strain over the season). The event was funded and promoted by the Welsh Tourist Board, who were looking to build on the Challenge Cup finals which had taken place in Cardiff between 2003 and 2005 due to the rebuilding of Wembley Stadium. After the success of the first Millennium Magic in 2007, it became an annual fixture in the Super League calendar.

Three Super League XII fixtures took place on Saturday 5 May 2007, and a further three on Sunday 6 May 2007. The games played were, where possible, 'local derby' matches in an attempt to maximise interest in the event. The two 'non-heartland' clubs in Super League at that time, Catalans Dragons (France) and Harlequins RL (London), were paired against each other. The teams would face their Millennium Magic derby opponents four times during the Super League XII season.

Celtic Crusaders opened the weekend against Oldham R.L.F.C. in a National League Two game on the Friday night (4 May) at Brewery Field, Bridgend. This match officially celebrated 100 years of club rugby league in Wales as Oldham were the first ever opponents to Merthyr Tydfil in the first professional game in Wales on 7 September 1907. In an eventful match, Oldham came back from 26-6 down to win 34–26 in front of 3,441 fans, a record attendance for a National League 2 match. It was also the first National League 2 game shown live on British television, covered by Sky Sports.

A 58,831 aggregate crowd saw the Magic event at the Millennium Stadium. Super League clubs agreed to repeat the event during the following season with Nigel Wood, the RFL's chief operating officer, saying: "The clubs and fans thoroughly enjoyed the day and our aim is to make next year's event even bigger and better."

As in 2007, three Super League XIII fixtures took place on the Saturday (3 May) and a further three on the Sunday (4 May).

The event again kicked off with the local south Wales team, Celtic Crusaders, but this time they were up against Featherstone Rovers at the Brewery Field, Bridgend in a National League 1 match. The Crusaders won the match by 28-point to 18. The match was held in front of a club record crowd of 6,152.

=== 2009–2010: Edinburgh ===
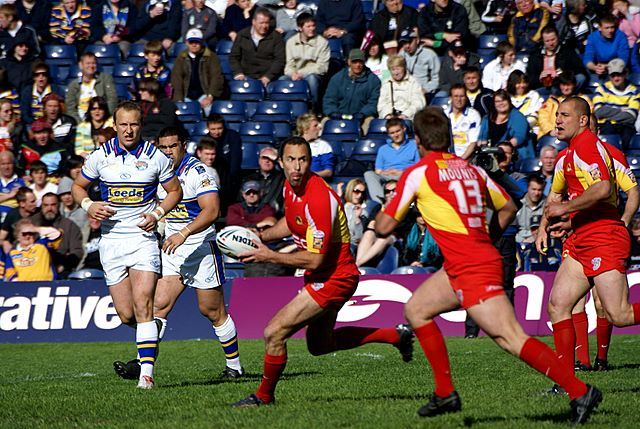
Catalans Dragons vs Leeds Rhinos during the third Sunday game of 2009

It was confirmed after the 2008 event that the weekend was to be moved in 2009 to Murrayfield Stadium in Edinburgh, Scotland. The event included matches based on a seeded draw, using finishing positions from Super League XIII.

The 2010 Magic weekend took place on 1–2 May 2010 at Murrayfield. After fan criticism of the seeded draw, The RFL decided to ask all 14 Super League clubs whether they would like to revert to derbies. The result favored a seeding again where the top 8 teams faced each other, and the bottom six would play each other.

=== 2011: Return to Cardiff ===
The Magic Weekend returned to its original location at the Millennium Stadium, and it saw the opening round of the 2011 Super League season on the weekend of 12–13 February 2011. The event also returned to the original format with the majority of the games being local rivalry games.

=== 2012–2014: Manchester ===
The 2012 event was held at the Etihad Stadium, home of Manchester City Football Club, and was the first time the Magic Weekend was held in England.

The date of the Magic Weekend was changed for 2012, reverting to a mid-season game week rather than as a season opener like 2011. However, unlike the first four Magic Weekends, the matches were played over a weekend at the end of May (after the end of the football season) rather than during the May Day bank holiday weekend at the start of May. Although the last weekend of May is usually the Late Spring Bank Holiday weekend, the Spring bank holiday in 2012 was moved back a weekend as part of the Diamond Jubilee.

Following the premise of previous Magic Weekends, the majority of the fixtures were local rivalry games. 2012 was the first time that Widnes Vikings participated in the Magic Weekend. The aggregate attendance of the weekend was 63,716 (the largest ever).

The 2013 Magic Weekend was once again held at the Etihad Stadium, Manchester, on Saturday 25 and Sunday 26 May.

As in 2012, the 2013 Magic Weekend took place after the end of the football season in May, on the late Spring bank holiday weekend.

As in previous years, some of the matches were local rivalries with Castleford playing Wakefield Trinity and Hull F.C. Hull Kingston Rovers, both repeat fixtures from 2012. The other four matches were new fixtures for the Magic Weekend and included St. Helens playing Warrington and Bradford vs Huddersfield, continuing the tradition of having local rivalry matches at the Magic Weekend.

On 31 May 2013, less than a week after the 2013 Magic Weekend, the RFL announced that the Magic Weekend would once again return to the Etihad Stadium, Manchester for 2014, with matches being played on Saturday 17 and Sunday 18 May.

On 23 January 2014, the fixtures were announced with, in a repeat of the 2013 fixtures, four matches set to take place on the Saturday with the remaining three scheduled for Sunday, including four local derbies (Huddersfield-Bradford, Hull Kingston Rovers-Hull FC, Wakefield Trinity-Castleford and Warrington-St Helens R.F.C.) plus the meeting of the last two winners of the Super League Grand Final, Wigan Warriors and Leeds Rhinos. The other matches consisted of Widnes vs Salford and London vs Catalans Dragons.

Controversy was created in the city of Hull following the announcement that the 2014 FA Cup Final was to take place at exactly the same time and date as the fixture between Hull FC and Hull KR, this being the first FA Cup final Hull City had qualified for. The RFL announced on 15 April 2014 that they would not be changing the fixture.

The aggregate attendance of 64,552 was the highest ever for a Magic Weekend, while the Saturday attendance of 36,339 was the highest ever single-day figure until both records were surpassed the consequent year in Newcastle-upon-Tyne.

=== 2015–2018: Newcastle ===
In 2015, the Magic Weekend was forced to move due to construction at the Etihad Stadium, which would commence immediately after the 2014–15 Premier League season had concluded, which meant the Magic Weekend was due to be changed, with Coventry's Ricoh Arena and Newcastle upon Tyne's St James' Park being considered by the RFL. Blake Solly had confirmed that the Etihad and Super League did have a good partnership, but there were alternatives available to host the event. On 10 September 2014, it was confirmed that the Magic Weekend had been awarded to Newcastle for 2015, and would be played 30 and 31 May 2015. With the Super League Reformatting in 2015, the Magic Weekend featured twelve teams and six matches, as opposed to the seven games in previous years.

The event was considered the most successful to date, with a record aggregate attendance of 67,788, a record single-day crowd of 40,871 on the Saturday and an estimated benefit of £4.2 million to the Newcastle economy.

After a successful event in Newcastle in 2015, the Magic Weekend returned to St James' Park for the second year running with most fixtures being based upon last season's league standings rather than local derbies. The top four from last season play each other; Leeds Rhinos v Wigan Warriors and St. Helens v Huddersfield Giants. Continuing with this trend, 5th placed Castleford Tigers play 6th placed Warrington Wolves and the two teams in the bottom four last season, Widnes Vikings and Salford Red Devils, play in a repeat of last year's fixture. Last season's bottom placed Wakefield Trinity Wildcats play Catalans Dragons: as the Dragons struggle away from home, this fixture is to give both teams a chance of winning. The only derby this year is the Hull Derby at the end of the weekend.

For the third consecutive season, Magic Weekend returned to Newcastle. This is the Leigh Centurions' first time playing at the Magic Weekend. This is because Magic Weekend first made an appearance in 2007, two seasons after Leigh's relegation.

For a fourth year in succession, Magic Weekend took place in Newcastle. As a curtain raiser, the first game to be played on the first day was a Championship fixture between Toronto Wolfpack and Toulouse Olympique.

=== 2019: Liverpool ===
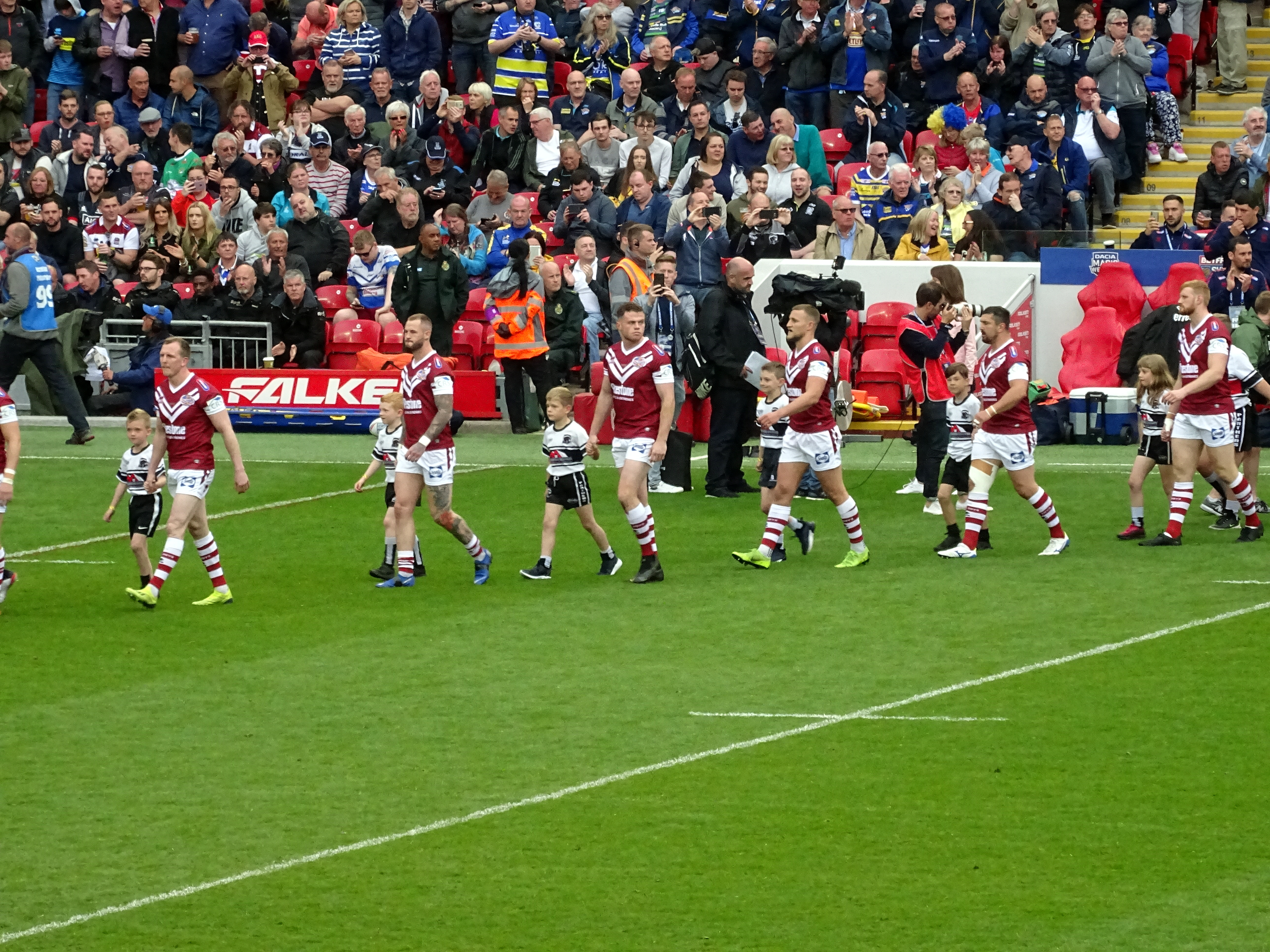
Wigan Warriors enter the pitch before the third Saturday game

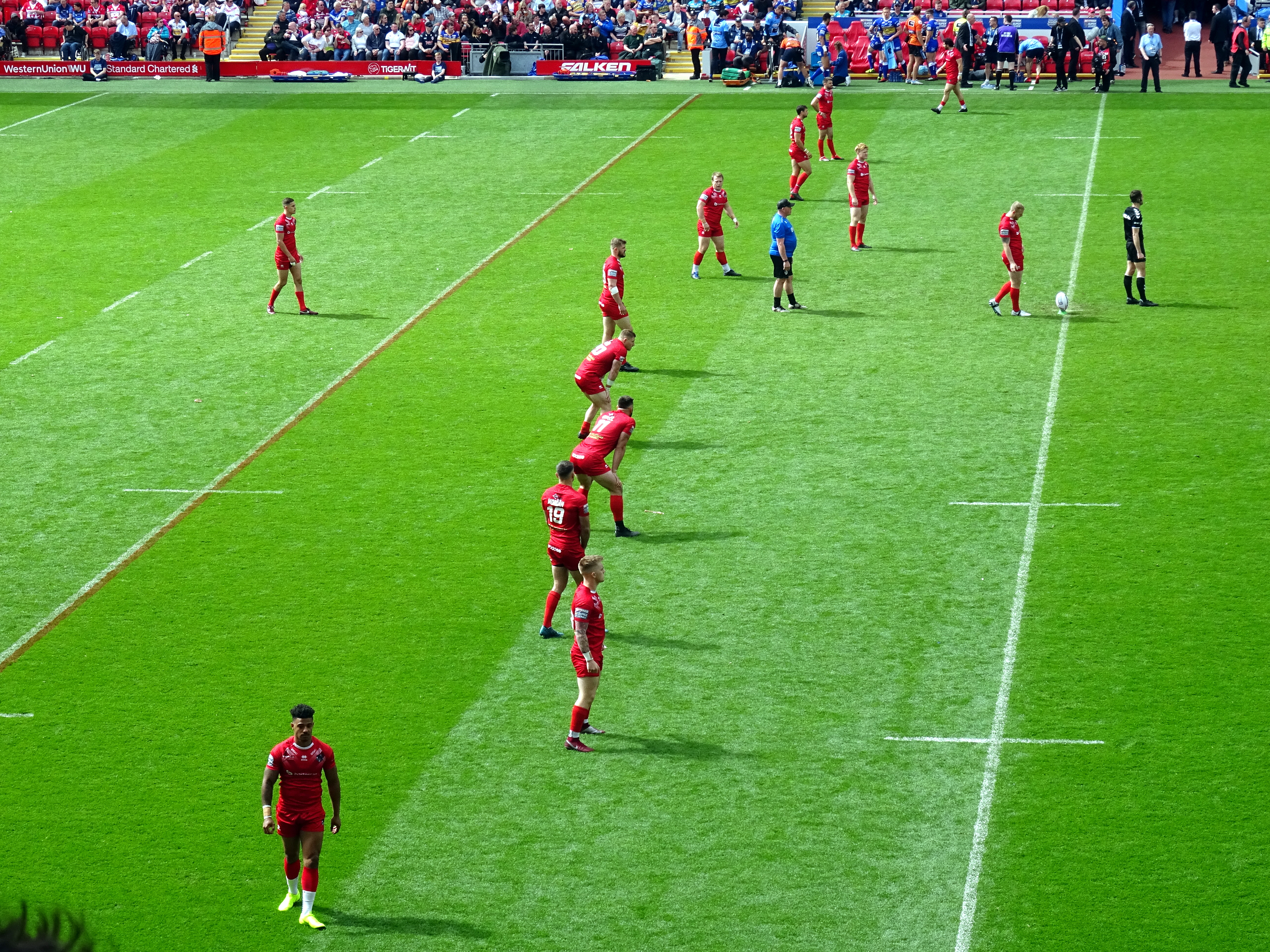
London Broncos kicking off the second Sunday game

Anfield was chosen as the venue for the 2019 Magic Weekend after two test matches were played there in 2016 and 2018. After previously choosing games that were local derbies or competitive games, in 2019 the fixtures were determined by the previous season's league position.

Robert Elstone, Super League Chief Executive, said "On behalf of the Super League clubs, we’re delighted to be taking the Dacia Magic Weekend to one of the most famous stadiums in the world.

=== 2020: Cancelled ===
The 2020 event was due to return to Newcastle's St James' Park, however it was cancelled due to the COVID-19 pandemic in addition to wider implications for the 2020 season.

=== 2021–2023: Return to Newcastle ===
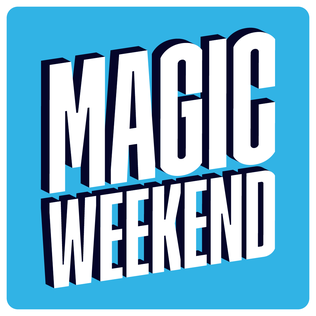
The logo for the 2023 edition of Magic Weekend

The Super League's Magic Weekend saw a belated return to Newcastle for the 2021 season. Fixtures for the event were announced on 23 February with matches scheduled to be played during the weekend of 4–5 September.

The Super League's Magic Weekend stayed in Newcastle, for the 2022 season. Fixtures for the event were announced on 23 February with matches played during the weekend of 9–10 July.

=== 2024: Leeds ===
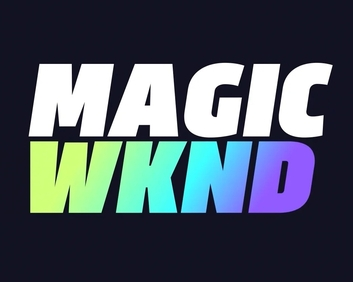
The logo used for the 2024 and 2025 events.

In November 2023, Super League confirmed Magic Weekend would take place at Elland Road in Leeds for the 2024 Super League season. Despite a poor public appetite for the 2024 event to be held at Elland Road, which resulted in the second lowest attendance since the event began, Magic Weekend 2024 was one of the more profitable editions of the event, which The Guardian attributed to the location being closer to participating clubs and the RFL headquarters. Rugby League Commercial (the RFL's marketing branch) labelled the weekend a success having beat the target attendance of 50,000, and stating that the previous target of 60,000 when at St James's Park was not unrealistic.

=== 2025: Return to Newcastle ===
Following the RFL partnership with IMG there were rumours that Magic Weekend would be scrapped for 2025 with it being known the IMG advising the RFL to remove loop fixtures from Super League which would include Magic Weekend. Ahead of Magic 2024, RL Commercial (the RFL's marketing branch) chief confirmed that while IMG and the RFL were looking to scrap loop fixtures, Magic Weekend would remain in the calendar.

Following the 2024 event, The Guardian stated that the RFL were considering a return to Newcastle, along with Nottingham, Dublin, and Cardiff as venues for Magic 2025.

=== 2026–: Return to Liverpool ===
On 25 November 2025, Super League announced that Magic Weekend would return to Liverpool, this time at Everton's Hill Dickinson Stadium. Magic Weekend 2026 will feature only the British teams in Super League, with the two French sides Catalans Dragons and Toulouse Olympique, contesting a "Magic Fixture" at a neutral venue in France on the same weekend. Before confirmation of its return, the event had previously been set to be removed following Super League's expansion to 14 teams and the subsequent removal of loop fixtures from the competition.

In June, Stade Pierre-Fabre in Castres was confirmed as the venue of the French Magic Fixture.

The 2026 event saw record ticket sales with 77,442 attending the Hill Dickinson Stadium. During the event, the RFL announced Magic Weekend would remain at Everton for 2027 with the event moving back to early May.

== Venues ==
City	Stadium	Count	Years
(England) Newcastle	St James' Park	8	2015, 2016, 2017, 2018, 2021, 2022, 2023, 2025
(Wales) Cardiff	Millennium Stadium	3	2007, 2008, 2011
(England) Manchester	Etihad Stadium	3	2012, 2013, 2014
(Scotland) Edinburgh	Murrayfield	2	2009, 2010
(England) Liverpool	Hill Dickinson Stadium	2	2026, 2027
(England) Liverpool	Anfield	1	2019
(England) Leeds	Elland Road	1	2024
(France) Castres	Stade Pierre-Fabre	1	2026 (Note: French Magic Fixture)

== Attendances ==
Year	City	Stadium	Day 1 Attendance (Games)	Day 2 Attendance (Games)	French Attendance (Games)	Weekend attendance
2007	(Wales) Cardiff	Millennium Stadium	32,384 (3)	26,447 (3)		58,831
2008	(Wales) Cardiff	Millennium Stadium	32,516 (3)	30,628 (3)		▲63,144
2009	(Scotland) Edinburgh	Murrayfield	30,122 (3)	29,627 (4)		▼59,749
2010	(Scotland) Edinburgh	Murrayfield	26,642 (4)	25,401 (3)		▼52,043
2011	(Wales) Cardiff	Millennium Stadium	30,891 (4)	29,323 (3)		▲60,214
2012	(England) Manchester	Etihad Stadium	32,953 (3)	30,763 (4)		▲63,716
2013	(England) Manchester	Etihad Stadium	31,249 (4)	30,793 (3)		▼62,042
2014	(England) Manchester	Etihad Stadium	36,339 (4)	28,213 (3)		▲64,552
2015	(England) Newcastle	St James' Park	40,871 (3)	26,970 (3)		▲67,841
2016	(England) Newcastle	St James' Park	39,331 (3)	28,945 (3)		▲68,276
2017	(England) Newcastle	St James' Park	35,361 (3)	30,046 (3)		▼65,407
2018	(England) Newcastle	St James' Park	38,881 (4) (Note: Day 1 of the 2018 event also featured a Championship game)	25,438 (3)		▼64,319
2019	(England) Liverpool	Anfield	30,057 (3)	26,812 (3)		▼56,869
2020	(England) Newcastle	St James' Park	Cancelled			
2021	(England) Newcastle	St James' Park	35,104 (3)	25,762 (3)		▲60,866
2022	(England) Newcastle	St James' Park	36,821 (3)	25,333 (3)		▲62,154
2023	(England) Newcastle	St James' Park	36,943 (3)	26,369 (3)		▲63,312
2024	(England) Leeds	Elland Road	30,810 (3)	22,293 (3)		▼53,103
2025	(England) Newcastle	St James' Park	31,294 (3)	32,862 (3)		▲64,156
2026	(England) Liverpool	Hill Dickinson Stadium	34,579 (3)	42,903 (3)	5,483 (1)	▲82,925
2027	(England) Liverpool	Hill Dickinson Stadium	-	-	-	-

== Sponsorship ==
Sponsor	Years	Name
Dacia	2016–2021	Dacia Magic Weekend
Sky 0	2022	Magic Weekend sponsored by Sky 0
Betfred	2023	Betfred Magic Weekend

== See also ==
- Magic Round
- Summer Bash
- Super League
- Rugby league in the British Isles
- Rugby league in England
- Rugby league in Scotland
- Rugby league in Wales
