= 2024 London Broncos season =

45th London Broncos season

- 2024 Super League Rank: 12th
- Play-off result: Did not qualify
- Challenge Cup: 6th round
- 2024 record: Wins: 3; draws: 0; losses: 25
- Points scored: For: 317; against: 916

Team information
- Chairman: David Hughes
- Head Coach: Mike Eccles
- Captain: Will Lovell
- Stadium: Plough Lane
- Avg. attendance: 3,178
- High attendance: 5,105

Top scorers
- Tries: Josh Rourke (8)
- Goals: Oliver Leyland (40)
- Points: Oliver Leyland (93)
Home colours	Away colours	Third Kit colours
← 2023	List of seasons	2025 →

The 2024 London Broncos season is the 45th year in the club's history, their first season back in the Super League since 2019 and their third season at Plough Lane as tenants of AFC Wimbledon. They are coached by Director of Rugby Mike Eccles. The Broncos will compete in both the 2024 Super League and the 2024 Challenge Cup. They were promoted to the Super League as winners of the 2023 Championship Grand Final.

== Preseason friendlies ==
Date and time	Versus	H/A	Venue	Result	Score	Tries	Goals	Attendance	Report
21 January; 15:00	Castleford Tigers	A	The Jungle	D	14-14	Storey, O. Leyland, Miloudi	O. Leyland (1/3)	2,069	
28 January, 15:00	Huddersfield Giants	A	John Smith's Stadium	L	15–60	Kershaw (2), Hoyes	O. Leyland (2/3)		
21 January; 15:00	Oldham	A	Boundary Park	D	18-18	Meadows, Macani, Adebiyi, Kershaw	O. Leyland (3/3)	1,214	

== Betfred Super League ==
=== Fixtures ===
Round	Date and time	Versus	H/A	Venue	Result	Score	Tries	Goals	Attendance	TV	Pos.	Report
1	16 February, 20:00	St Helens	A	Totally Wicked Stadium	L	4-40	Storey		14,058	Sky Sports Action		
2	23 February, 20:00	Catalans Dragons	H	Plough Lane	L	0-34			5,105	Sky Sports Action		
3	3 March, 15:00	Hull FC	A	MKM Stadium	L	24–28	Miloudi (2), Meadows, Kershaw, Storey	O. Leyland (2/5)	10,062	Sky Sports Action		
4	9 March, 15:00	Wigan Warriors	H	Plough Lane	L	22–60	Kershaw (2), Jones, Williams	O. Leyland (3/4)	4,116	Sky Sports Arena		
5	17 March, 15:00	Warrington Wolves	H	Plough Lane	L	4-58	Miloudi	Miloudi (0/1)	3,324	Sky Sports Arena		
6	31 March, 15:00	Huddersfield Giants	H	Plough Lane	L	6–26	O. Leyland	O. Leyland (1/1)	2,300	Sky Sports Action		
7	5 April, 20:00	Hull KR	A	Craven Park	L	10–50	Davis, Macani	O. Leyland (1/2)	10,201	Sky Sports Mix		
8	20 April, 15:00	Salford Red Devils	H	Plough Lane	L	4–12	Macani	O. Leyland (0/1)	2,450	Sky Sports Main Event/Arena		
9	26 April, 20:00	Castleford Tigers	A	The Jungle	L	0–40			6,996	Sky Sports Mix		
10	3 May, 20:00	Leeds Rhinos	A	Headingley	L	8–46	Natoli, Storey	O. Leyland (0/2)	13,259	Sky Sports Mix		
11	12 May, 15:00	Hull FC	H	Plough Lane	W	34–18	Walker, Meadows, Storey, Bassett, Kershaw, O. Leyland	O. Leyland (5/7)	3,225	Sky Sports Action		
12	26 May, 15:00	Hull KR	H	Plough Lane	L	14–64	Walker, Macani, Bassett	O. Leyland (1/3)	3,750	Sky Sports Arena		
13	2 June, 15:00	Salford Red Devils	A	AJ Bell Stadium	L	4–34	Miloudi	O. Leyland (0/1)	2,843	Sky Sports Action		
14	16 June, 15:00	St Helens	H	Plough Lane	L	6–52	Kershaw	O. Leyland (1/1)	4,600	Sky Sports Action		
15	21 June, 20:00	Wigan Warriors	A	Brick Community Stadium	L	0–36			14,280	Sky Sports Arena		
16	6 July, 15:00	Leeds Rhinos	A	Headingley	L	16–17 (g.p.)	Rourke, Kennedy, Macani	O. Leyland (2/3)	12,958	Sky Sports Action		
17	12 July, 20:00	Castleford Tigers	H	Stonebridge Road (Note: The fixture was held away from Plough Lane as the pitch was being resurfaced.)	L	20–34	Rourke, Lovell, Stock, Bienek	O. Leyland (2/4)	2,050	Sky Sports Arena		
18	19 July, 20:00	Leigh Leopards	A	Leigh Sports Village	L	6–36	Rourke	O. Leyland (1/1)	6,677	Sky Showcase		
19	26 July, 20:00	Hull KR	A	Craven Park	L	16–40	Bienek, Rourke, Macani	O. Leyland (2/3)	9,585	Sky Sports Arena		
20	4 August, 15:00	Catalans Dragons	H	Plough Lane	W	12–10	Jones, Bassett	O. Leyland (2/2)	1,900	Sky Sports Action		
21	11 August, 15:00	Warrington Wolves	H	Plough Lane	L	22–36	Rourke, Bienek, Davies, Tison	O. Leyland (3/4)	2,150	Sky Sports +		
22	17 August, 14:30 (Magic Weekend)	Hull FC	N	Elland Road	W	29–4	Rourke (2), Campagnolo, O. Leyland	O. Leyland (4/4 + 2 pen.); Drop-goals: O. Leyland	30,810	Sky Sports Action		
23	25 August, 15:00	Leigh Leopards	H	Plough Lane	L	12–32	Davis, Rourke	O. Leyland (2/2)	1,950	Not televised		
24	30 August, 20:00	Leeds Rhinos	H	Plough Lane	L	20–21 (g.p.)	Campagnolo, Waine, Kershaw, Natoli	O. Leyland (2/4)	4,403	Sky Sports +		
25	8 September, 15:00	Huddersfield Giants	A	John Smith's Stadium	L	16–22	Stock, Miloudi, Adebiyi	O. Leyland (2/3)	3,439	Sky Sports +		
26	14 September, 20:00 (BST)	Catalans Dragons	A	Stade Gilbert Brutus	L	8–12	Kershaw	O. Leyland (1/1 + 1 pen.)	8,855	Sky Sports +		
27	20 September, 20:00	Warrington Wolves	A	Halliwell Jones Stadium	L	54-0			10,192	Sky Sports +		

=== Table ===
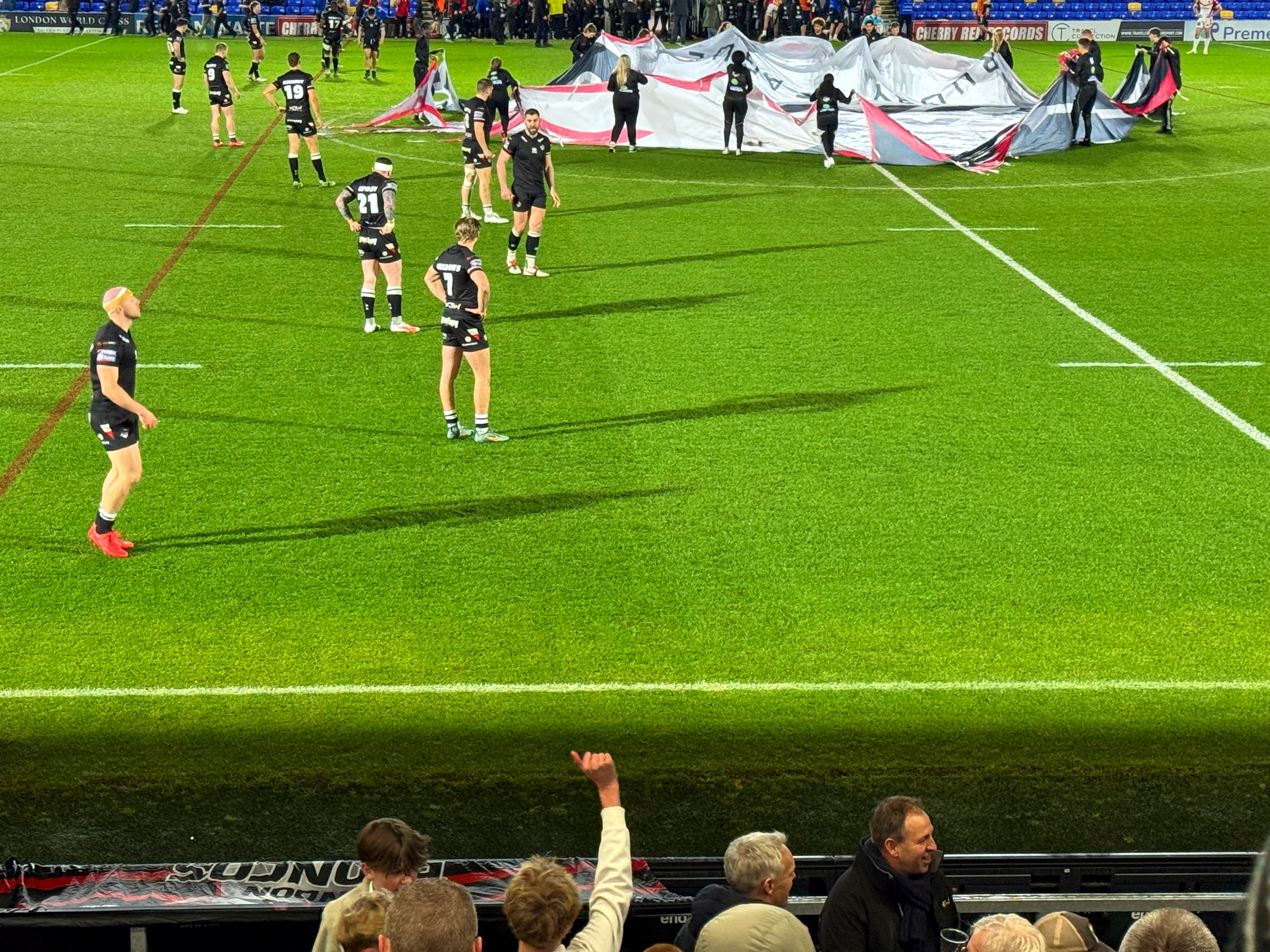
The London Broncos preparing to kick off their first home game of the season at Plough Lane in February 2024

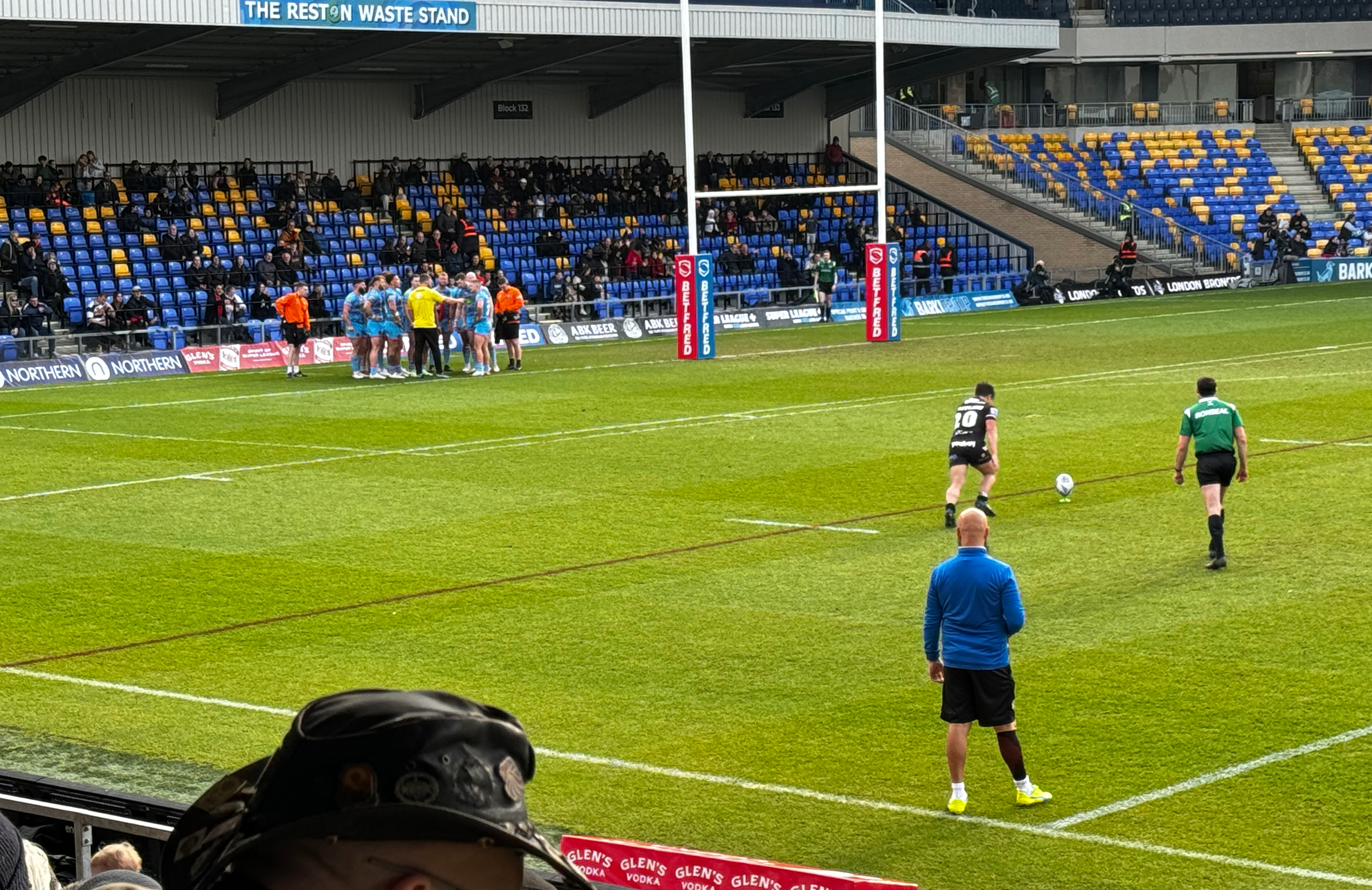
Oliver Leyland kicking at goal against the Wigan Warriors in March 2024

Pos	Team	Pld	W	D	L	PF	PA	PD	Pts	Qualification
1	Wigan Warriors (C)	27	22	0	5	723	338	+385	44	Advance to Semi-finals
2	Hull Kingston Rovers (Y)	27	21	0	6	719	326	+393	42	Advance to Semi-finals
3	Warrington Wolves	27	20	0	7	740	319	+421	40	Advance to Eliminators
4	Salford Red Devils	27	16	0	11	550	547	+3	32	Advance to Eliminators
5	Leigh Leopards	27	15	1	11	566	398	+168	31	Advance to Eliminators
6	St Helens	27	15	0	12	596	388	+208	30	Advance to Eliminators
7	Catalans Dragons	27	15	0	12	474	427	+47	30	
8	Leeds Rhinos	27	14	0	13	530	488	+42	28	
9	Huddersfield Giants	27	10	0	17	468	660	−192	20	
10	Castleford Tigers	27	7	1	19	425	735	−310	15	
11	Hull FC	27	3	0	24	328	894	−566	6	
12	London Broncos (R)	27	3	0	24	317	916	−599	6	Relegated to Championship

(C) Champions; (R) Relegated; (Y) Runners up

== Challenge Cup ==
Date and time	Round	Versus	H/A	Venue	Result	Score	Tries	Goals	Attendance	TV	Report
23 March; 17:30	Round 6	Warrington Wolves	A	Halliwell Jones Stadium	L	0-42			3,416	BBC One	

== Transfers ==
=== Gains ===
Player	Club	Contract	Date
(England) Jack Hughes	Bedford Blues	1 Year	2023
(England) James Meadows	Batley Bulldogs	1 Year	November 2023
(England) Gideon Boafo	Newcastle Thunder	2 Years	November 2023
(Nigeria) Sadiq Adebiyi	Keighley Cougars	2 Years	November 2023
(England) Robbie Storey	Keighley Cougars	1 Year	November 2023
(Australia) Rhys Kennedy	Hull KR	1 Year	November 2023
(England) Josh Rourke	Whitehaven	1 Year	December 2023
(France) Hakim Miloudi	Limoux	1 Year	January 2024
(Italy) Jack Campagnolo	Souths Logan Magpies	1 Year	January 2024
(England) Lee Kershaw	Wakefield Trinity	1 Year	February 2024

=== Losses ===
Player	Club	Contract	Date
(Cook Islands) Paul Ulberg	Toulouse Olympique	1 Year + 1 Year	November 2023
(Papua New Guinea) Wellington Albert	Featherstone Rovers	1 Year	December 2023
(Australia) Corey Norman			December 2023
(Fiji) Henry Raiwalui			January 2024
(New Zealand) Dean Whare	Pia Donkeys		January 2024
(England) Max Allen			2023
(England) Samuel Dore			2023
(Wales) Dalton Grant			2023
(England) Rian Horsman			2023
(England) Jack Howorth			2023
(England) Euan Parke			2023

=== Loans ===
Player	Club	Contract	Date
(England) Jacob Jones	Leigh Leopards	1 month loan	February 2024
(England) Fenton Rogers	Huddersfield Giants	1 month loan	February 2024
(England) Reiss Butterworth	Hull KR	2 week loan	March 2024
(England) Harvey Makin	Wigan Warriors	1-month loan	March 2024

== 2024 squad ==
2024 London Broncos Squad
First team squad			Coaching staff
1 (Scotland) Alex Walker – FB; 2 (England) Lee Kershaw – WG; 3 (Australia) Jarred Bassett – CE; 4 (France) Hakim Miloudi – CE, FB; 5 (England) Iliess Macani – WG; 6 (Italy) Jack Campagnolo – SO, SH; 7 (England) James Meadows – SH, SO; 8 (England) Rob Butler – PR; 9 (England) Sam Davis – HK; 10 (Ireland) Lewis Bienek – PR; 11 (England) Will Lovell (c) – SR; 12 (Italy) Ethan Natoli – SR; 13 (Italy) Dean Parata – HK, LF	14 (England) Bill Leyland – HK; 15 (England) Marcus Stock – PR, SR, LF; 16 (England) Jordan Williams – PR; 17 (Nigeria) Sadiq Adebiyi – PR, SR, LF; 18 (Papua New Guinea) Emmanuel Waine – SR, LF; 19 (Australia) Rhys Kennedy – PR; 20 (England) Oliver Leyland – SO, SH, FB; 21 (England) Robbie Storey – CE; 22 (England) Gideon Boafo – WG; 23 (England) Josh Rourke – CE, FB; 24 (England) Matt Davies – HK; 25 (England) Harry Stevens – CE; 26 (England) Jensen Monk – LF	27 (England) Dan Hoyes – WG; 28 (England) Jack Hughes – PR; 29 (England) Jacob Jones – SR; 30 (England) Fenton Rogers – PR; 32 (England) Joe Stocks – SR; 33 (England) Harvey Makin – PR; 34 (France) Ugo Tison – SO, HK	Head coach: (England) Mike Eccles; Assistant coach: (Ireland) Ryan Sheridan; Legend: (c) Captain(s); (vc) Vice-captain(s); Injured; Updated: 27 March 2024; Source(s):

== Statistics ==
Squad Number	Name	International country	Position	Age	Previous club	Appearances	Tries	Goals	Drop Goals	Points	Notes
1	Alex Walker	(Scotland)	Fullback	-	Halifax Panthers	13	2	0	0	8	
2	Lee Kershaw	(England)	Wing	-	Wakefield Trinity	26	7	0	0	28	
3	Jarred Bassett	(Australia)	Centre	-	London Skolars	25	3	0	0	12	overseas quota
4	Hakim Miloudi	(France)	Centre	-	Limoux Grizzlies	24	5	0	0	20	
5	Iliess Macani	(England)	Wing	-	London Skolars	14	5	0	0	20	
6	Jack Campagnolo	(Italy)	Stand-off	-	Souths Logan Magpies	14	2	0	0	8	overseas quota
7	James Meadows	(England)	Scrum-half	-	Batley Bulldogs	18	2	0	0	8	
8	Rob Butler	(England)	Prop	-	Wakefield Trinity	24	0	0	0	0	
9	Sam Davis	(England)	Hooker	-	York Knights	23	3	0	0	12	
10	Lewis Bienek	(Ireland)	Prop	-	Castleford Tigers	16	3	0	0	12	
11	Will Lovell	(England)	Second-row	-	London Skolars	27	1	0	0	4	
12	Ethan Natoli	(Italy)	Second-row	-	Newtown Jets	16	2	0	0	8	overseas quota
13	Dean Parata	(Italy)	Hooker	-	Featherstone Rovers	13	0	0	0	0	overseas quota
14	Bill Leyland	(England)	Hooker	-	London Broncos Academy	0	0	0	0	0	
15	Marcus Stock	(England)	Second-row	-	York Knights	28	2	0	0	8	
16	Jordan Williams	(England)	Prop	-	London Skolars	13	1	0	0	4	
17	Emmanuel Waine	(Papua New Guinea)	Second-row	-	PNG Hunters	9	1	0	0	4	overseas quota
18	Sadiq Adebiyi	(Nigeria)	Second-row	-	Keighley Cougars	21	1	0	0	4	
19	Rhys Kennedy	(Australia)	Prop	-	Hull Kingston Rovers	27	1	0	0	4	overseas quota
20	Oli Leyland	(England)	Stand-off	-	London Broncos Academy	28	1	40	1	93	
21	Robbie Storey	(England)	Centre	-	Keighley Cougars	17	4	0	0	16	
22	Gideon Boafo	(England)	Wing	-	Newcastle Thunder	2	0	0	0	0	
23	Josh Rourke	(England)	Centre	-	Whitehaven	12	8	0	0	32	
24	Matt Davies	(England)	Hooker	-	Northern Pride	2	0	0	0	0	
25	Harry Stevens	(England)	Centre	-	London Broncos Academy	0	0	0	0	0	
26	Jensen Monk	(England)	Loose forward	-	London Broncos Academy	1	0	0	0	0	
27	Dan Hoyes	(England)	Wing	-	London Broncos Academy	1	0	0	0	0	
28	Jack Hughes	(England)	Prop	-	Bedford Blues	3	0	0	0	0	
29	Jacob Jones	(England)	Second-row	-	Leigh Leopards	25	2	0	0	8	Loan
30	Fenton Rogers	(England)	Prop	-	Huddersfield Giants	3	0	0	0	0	Loan
31	Reiss Butterworth	(England)	Hooker	-	Hull Kingston Rovers	3	0	0	0	0	Loan
32	Joe Stocks	(England)	Second-row	-	London Broncos Academy	1	0	0	0	0	
33	Harvey Makin	(England)	Prop	-	Wigan Warriors	6	0	0	0	0	Loan
34	Ugo Tison	(France)	Hooker	-	Catalans Dragons	19	1	0	0	4	

== Player appearances ==
No	Player	1	2	3	4	5	6 CC	6	7	8	9	10	11	12	13	14	15	16	17	18	19	20	21	22	23	24	25	26	27
1	Alex Walker	Sent to blood bin	Sent to blood bin	Sent to blood bin	SUB	FB	FB	FB	FB	FB	FB	FB	FB	FB	FB	FB	FB	Sent to blood bin	Sent to blood bin	Sent to blood bin	Sent to blood bin	Sent to blood bin							
2	Lee Kershaw	WG	WG	WG	WG	WG	WG	WG		WG	WG	WG	WG	WG	WG	WG	WG	WG	WG	WG		WG	WG	WG	WG	WG	WG	WG	WG
3	Jarred Bassett		SUB	CE	CE	CE	CE	CE			CE	CE	CE	CE	CE	CE	CE	CE	CE	CE	CE	CE	CE	CE	CE	CE	CE	CE	CE
4	Hakim Miloudi	CE	CE	WG	FB	CE	CE		CE	CE	WG	WG	WG	SH	WG	WG	WG				WG	WG	WG	WG	SUB	WG	WG	WG	WG
5	Iliess Macani	WG	WG	SUB	WG	WG		WG	WG	WG				WG				WG	WG	WG	WG				WG				
6	Jack Campagnolo	SO	SO	SO		SO	Sent to blood bin	Sent to blood bin	Sent to blood bin	Sent to blood bin	Sent to blood bin	Sent to blood bin	Sent to blood bin	Sent to blood bin	Sent to blood bin	Sent to blood bin	Sent to blood bin	Sent to blood bin	Sent to blood bin	SUB	SH	SH	SH	SO	SH	SH	SH	SH	SH
7	Jimmy Meadows	SH	SH	SH	SH	SH	SH	SH	SH	SH	SH	SUB	SH		SH	SH	SH	SH	SH	Sent to blood bin	Sent to blood bin	Sent to blood bin	Sent to blood bin	Sent to blood bin	Sent to blood bin	Sent to blood bin	Sent to blood bin	Sent to blood bin	SUB
8	Rob Butler	PR	PR	PR	SUB	PR	SUB	SUB	SUB	PR		SUB	SUB	SUB	SUB				SUB	PR	PR	SUB	PR	PR	PR	PR	PR	PR	PR
9	Sam Davis	HK	HK	HK	HK		HK	HK	HK	HK	HK	HK		SUB	HK			HK	HK	HK	HK	HK	HK	HK	HK	HK	HK	HK	
10	Lewis Bienek	Sent to blood bin	Sent to blood bin	Sent to blood bin	Sent to blood bin	Sent to blood bin	Sent to blood bin	Sent to blood bin	Sent to blood bin	Sent to blood bin	Sent to blood bin	Sent to blood bin	SUB	SUB	PR	PR	PR	PR	PR	SUB	SUB		SUB	SUB	SUB	SUB	SUB	SUB	SUB
11	Will Lovell	SR	SR	SR	SR	SR		SR	SR	SR	SR	SR	SR	SR	SR	SR	SR	SR	SR	SR	SR	SR	SR	SR	SR	SR	SR	SR	SR
12	Ethan Natoli	Sent to blood bin	Sent to blood bin	Sent to blood bin	Sent to blood bin	Sent to blood bin	Sent to blood bin	Sent to blood bin	Sent to blood bin	Sent to blood bin	Sent to blood bin	SUB	SR	SR		SR		SUB	SUB	CE	CE	CE	CE	CE	CE	CE	CE	CE	CE
13	Dean Parata	LF	LF	LF	Sent to blood bin	LF	LF	LF	LF	SUB	LF	Sent to blood bin			Sent to blood bin	Sent to blood bin				SUB	SUB	LF	SUB						
14	Bill Leyland	Sent to blood bin	Sent to blood bin	Sent to blood bin	Sent to blood bin	Sent to blood bin	Sent to blood bin	Sent to blood bin	Sent to blood bin	Sent to blood bin	Sent to blood bin	Sent to blood bin	Sent to blood bin	Sent to blood bin	Sent to blood bin	Sent to blood bin	Sent to blood bin	Sent to blood bin	Sent to blood bin	Sent to blood bin	Sent to blood bin	Sent to blood bin	Sent to blood bin	Sent to blood bin	Sent to blood bin	Sent to blood bin	Sent to blood bin	Sent to blood bin	Sent to blood bin
15	Marcus Stock	SUB	SUB	SUB	LF	SUB	SR	PR	PR	LF	PR	LF	LF	LF	SUB	SUB	PR	SUB	SUB	LF	B	PR	LF	LF	LF	LF	LF	LF	LF
16	Jordan Williams	SUB	SUB	SUB	SUB	SUB	PR	SUB		SUB	SUB				SUB	SUB	SUB	SUB											
17	Emmanuel Waine	SUB	Sent to blood bin	Sent to blood bin	Sent to blood bin	Sent to blood bin	Sent to blood bin	Sent to blood bin	Sent to blood bin	Sent to blood bin	Sent to blood bin	Sent to blood bin	Sent to blood bin	Sent to blood bin	Sent to blood bin	SUB	SUB			SUB				SUB		SUB	SUB	SUB	SUB
18	Sadiq Adebiyi	SR	SR								SUB	PR	PR	PR	SR	SUB	SR	SR	SR	SR	SR	SR	SR	SR	SR	SR	SR	SUB	SR
19	Rhys Kennedy	PR	PR	PR	PR	SUB	PR	PR	PR	PR	PR	PR	PR	PR	PR	PR		PR	PR	PR	PR	PR	PR	PR	PR	PR	PR	PR	PR
20	Oliver Leyland	FB	FB	FB	SO	SUB	SO	SO	SO	SO	SO	SO	SO	SO	SO	SO	SO	SO	SO	SO	SO	SO	SO	SH	SO	SO	SO	SO	SO
21	Robbie Storey	CE	CE	CE	CE		SR	CE	CE	CE	CE	CE	CE	CE	CE	CE	CE	CE	CE	x	x	x	x	x	x	x	x	x	x
22	Gideon Boafo	x	x	x	x	x	WG	x	WG	x	x	x	x	x	x	x	x	x	x	x	x	x	x	x	x	x	x	x	x
23	Josh Rourke	Sent to blood bin	Sent to blood bin	Sent to blood bin	Sent to blood bin	Sent to blood bin	Sent to blood bin	Sent to blood bin	Sent to blood bin	Sent to blood bin	Sent to blood bin	Sent to blood bin	Sent to blood bin	Sent to blood bin	Sent to blood bin	Sent to blood bin	Sent to blood bin	FB	FB	FB	FB	FB	FB	FB	FB	FB	FB	FB	FB
24	Matt Davies	SUB	x	x	x	x	x	x	x	x	x	x	x	x	x	x	HK	x	x	x	x	x	x	x	x	x	x	x	x
26	Jenson Monk	x	x	x	x	x	SUB	x	x	x	x	x	x	x	x	x	x	x	x	x	x	x	x	x	x	x	x	x	x
27	Daniel Hoyes	x	x	x	x	x	x	x	SUB	x	x	x	x	x	x	x	x	x	x	x	x	x	x	x	x	x	x	x	x
28	Jack Hughes	x	x	x	x	x	SUB	x	SUB	x	x	x	x	x	x	x	SUB	x	x	x	x	x	x	x	x	x	x	x	x
29	Jacob Jones		SUB	SR	SR	SR		SR	SR	SR	SR	SR	SUB	SUB	LF	LF	LF	LF	LF		LF	SUB	SUB	SUB	SUB	SUB	SUB	SR	HK
30	Fenton Rogers			SUB	PR	PR																							
31	Reiss Butterworth				SUB	HK		SUB																					
32	Joe Stocks	x	x	x	x	x	SUB	x	x	x	x	x	x	x	x	x	x	x	x	x	x	x	x	x	x	x	x	x	x
33	Harvey Makin							SUB	SUB	SUB	SUB	SUB	SUB																
34	Ugo Tison									SUB	SUB	SH	HK	HK	SUB	HK	SUB	SUB	SUB	SH	SUB	SUB	SUB	SUB	SUB	SUB		SUB	SUB
