= 2020 London Broncos season =

- 2020 Championship Rank: 3rd - Season abandoned due to global pandemic
- Play-off result: N/A
- Challenge Cup: 4th round
- 2020 record: Wins: 4; draws: 0; losses: 2

Team information
- Chairman: David Hughes
- Head Coach: Danny Ward
- Captain: Will Lovell
- Stadium: Trailfinders Sports Ground
- Avg. attendance: 771
- High attendance: 1,035

Top scorers
- Tries: Tuoyo Egodo - 5
- Goals: Kieran Dixon - 15
- Points: Kieran Dixon - 38
Home colours	Away colours
← 2019	List of seasons	2021 →

The 2020 London Broncos season was the 41st season in the clubs history and the first season out of the Super League after relegation in Super League XXIV. Coached by Danny Ward, the London Broncos competed in the Betfred Championship and the 2020 Challenge Cup.

It was their fifth season at the Trailfinders Sports Ground in West Ealing, London. The season was abandoned after five rounds, however the Broncos had already been eliminated from the Challenge Cup at the 4th round stage.

== 2020 standings ==
Pos	Team	Pld	W	D	L	PF	PA	PD	BP	Pts
1	Toulouse Olympique	5	5	0	0	180	48	+132	0	10
2	Leigh Centurions	4	4	0	0	162	40	+122	0	8
3	Featherstone Rovers	4	4	0	0	137	74	+63	0	8
4	London Broncos	5	4	0	1	120	92	+28	0	8
5	Widnes Vikings	5	3	0	2	128	92	+36	0	6
6	Dewsbury Rams	4	3	0	1	72	66	+6	0	6
7	Bradford Bulls	4	2	0	2	90	60	+30	0	4
8	Halifax	4	2	0	2	82	73	+9	0	4
9	Batley Bulldogs	5	1	0	4	82	133	−51	1	3
10	Swinton Lions	3	1	0	2	48	55	−7	0	2
11	Sheffield Eagles	5	1	0	4	60	148	−88	0	2
12	Oldham	5	1	0	4	46	158	−112	0	2
13	York City Knights	4	0	0	4	26	102	−76	0	0
14	Whitehaven	5	0	0	5	54	146	−92	0	0

Updated to match(es) played on 8 March 2020. Season abandoned on 20 July 2020.. Source:

== 2020 squad ==
Squad Number	Name	International country	Position	Age	Previous club	Appearances	Tries	Goals	Field goals	Points
1	Olly Ashall-Bott	(England)	Fullback	22	Widnes Vikings	1	0	0	0	0
2	Tuoyo Egodo	(Nigeria)	Wing	23	Castleford Tigers	6	5	0	0	20
3	Guy Armitage	(England)	Centre	28	Ealing Trailfinders RU	5	2	0	0	8
4	Will Lovell	(England)	Centre	26	London Skolars	3	0	0	0	0
5	Kieran Dixon	(England)	Wing	27	Hull Kingston Rovers	5	2	15	0	38
6	Cory Aston	(England)	Stand-off	25	Castleford Tigers	6	1	1	0	6
7	Morgan Smith	(England)	Scrum-half	21	Warrington Wolves	2	0	0	0	0
8	Eddie Battye	(England)	Prop	28	Sheffield Eagles	6	1	0	0	4
9	Éloi Pélissier	(France)	Hooker	28	Lézignan Sangliers	3	3	0	0	12
10	Rob Butler	(England)	Prop	21	London Broncos Academy	5	1	0	0	4
11	Josh Walters	(England)	Second-row	25	Featherstone Rovers	6	3	0	0	12
12	Rhys Curran	(France)	Second-row	30	Toulouse Olympique	6	3	0	0	12
13	Sadiq Adebiyi	(Nigeria)	Loose forward	23	London Broncos Academy	1	0	0	0	0
14	Matty Fozard	(Wales)	Hooker	25	Sheffield Eagles	6	2	1	0	10
15	Greg Richards	(England)	Prop	24	Leigh Centurions	2	0	0	0	0
16	Olsi Krasniqi	(Albania)	Prop	27	Toronto Wolfpack	6	0	0	0	0
17	James Meadows	(England)	Stand-off	20	London Broncos Academy	5	0	0	0	0
18	Dan Norman	(England)	Prop	22	Widnes Vikings	5	0	0	0	0
19	Jacob Ogden	(Jamaica)	Centre	21	London Broncos Academy	5	2	0	0	8
20	Dan Hindmarsh	(England)	Second-row	21	London Broncos Academy	4	2	0	0	8
21	Sam Davis	(England)	Hooker	21	London Broncos Academy	6	0	0	0	0
22	Gideon Boafo	(Ghana)	Wing	21	London Broncos Academy	0	0	0	0	0
23	Jordan Williams	(England)	Second-row	22	London Skolars	3	0	0	0	0
24	Rian Horsman	(England)	Hooker	19	London Broncos Academy	0	0	0	0	0
25	Oli Leyland	(England)	Hooker	19	London Broncos Academy	0	0	0	0	0
26	Mitch Allgood	(Australia)	Prop	30	St. George Illawarra Dragons	1	0	0	0	0
27	Will Blakemore	(England)	Loose forward	-	London Broncos Academy	1	0	0	0	0
28	Josh Hodson	(Wales)	Wing	19	London Broncos Academy	2	0	0	0	0
29	Ed Chamberlain	(Ireland)	Wing	24	Salford Red Devils	1	0	0	0	0

== Player appearances ==
No	Player	1	2	3	4 CC	4	5
1	Olly Ashall-Bott				FB		
2	Tuoyo Egodo	WG	WG	WG	WG	WG	WG
3	Guy Armitage	CE		CE	CE	CE	CE
4	Will Lovell	CE	CE				CE
5	Kieran Dixon	FB	FB	WG		WG	FB
6	Cory Aston	SH	SH	SH	SO	SO	SO
7	Morgan Smith					SH	SH
8	Eddie Battye	LF	LF	LF	PR	PR	LF
9	Éloi Pélissier			SUB	SUB	HK	
10	Rob Butler	PR	SUB	PR		SUB	PR
11	Josh Walters	SR	CE	SR	SUB	SR	SR
12	Rhys Curran	SR	SR	SR	SR	SR	SR
13	Sadiq Adebiyi	SUB					
14	Matty Fozard	HK	HK	SO	LF	LF	HK
15	Greg Richards	PR	PR				
16	Olsi Krasniqi	SUB	SUB	PR	PR	PR	SUB
17	Jimmy Meadows	SO	SO	FB	SH	FB	
18	Dan Norman	SUB	PR	SUB	SUB		SUB
19	Jacob Ogden	WG	WG	CE	CE	CE	
20	Dan Hindmarsh-Takyi		SR	SUB	SR	SUB	
21	Sam Davis	SUB	SUB	HK	HK	SUB	SUB
23	Jordan Williams		SUB	SUB			SUB
26	Mitch Allgood						PR
27	Will Blakemore				SUB		
28	Josh Hodson				WG	SUB	
29	Ed Chamberlain						WG
