= 2025 London Broncos season =

46th London Broncos season

- 2025 RFL Championship Rank: 10th
- Play-off result: Did not qualify
- Challenge Cup: 2nd round
- RFL 1895 Cup: Quarter-final
- 2025 record: Wins: 9; draws: 0; losses: 18
- Points scored: For: 510; against: 615

Team information
- Chairman: Gary Hetherington
- Head Coach: Mike Eccles
- Captain: Will Lovell
- Stadium: Plough Lane
- Avg. attendance: 800
- High attendance: 800

Top scorers
- Tries: Liam Tindall (17)
- Goals: Jack Smith (49)
- Points: Jack Smith (118)
Home colours	Away colours	Third Kit colours
← 2024	List of seasons	2026 →

The 2025 London Broncos season was the 46th year in the club's history, their first season back in RFL Championship after a single season back in the Super League. It was their fourth season at Plough Lane as tenants of AFC Wimbledon. They were coached by Director of Rugby Mike Eccles. The Broncos competed in the 2025 RFL Championship, 2025 Challenge Cup and the 2025 RFL 1895 Cup.

== Preseason friendlies ==
Date and time	Round	Versus	H/A	Venue	Result	Score	Tries	Goals	Attendance	TV	Report
18 January; 16:00	Friendly	North Wales Crusaders	A	Stadiwm CSM	N/A	Postponed due to local water outages following flooding					

== Betfred Championship ==
=== Fixtures ===
Betfred Championship
Round	Home	Score	Away	Match Information
Round	Home	Score	Away	Date and Time	Venue	Referee	Attendance
1	Bradford Bulls	20–6	London Broncos	16 February 2025, 15:00	Odsal Stadium	W. Turley	2,698
2	London Broncos	14–12	Featherstone Rovers	23 February 2025, 15:00	Plough Lane	M. Lynn	800
3	BYE
4	Oldham	50–6	London Broncos	23 March 2025, 15:00	Boundary Park	S. Mikalauskas	1,567
5	London Broncos	26–6	Hunslet	29 March 2025, 17:00	Plough Lane	K. Moore
6	London Broncos	14–16	Batley Bulldogs	12 April 2025, 17:00	Plough Lane	R. Cox
7	Barrow Raiders	24–6	London Broncos	18 April 2025, 15:00	Craven Park	T. Jones	1,754
8	Halifax Panthers	40–12	London Broncos	27 April 2025, 15:00	The Shay	D. Arnold	1,783
9	London Broncos	6–36	York Knights	3 May 2025, 17:00	Plough Lane	A. Belafonte
10	London Broncos	20–22	Sheffield Eagles	11 May 2025, 15:00	The Rock (Note: Plough Lane unavailable to London due to AFC Wimbledon being involved in the EFL play-offs)	R. Cox	850
11	Doncaster	30–12	London Broncos	25 May 2025, 15:00	Eco-Power Stadium	R. Cox	1,177
12	London Broncos	10–12	Widnes Vikings	31 May 2025, 17:00	Plough Lane	A. Belafonte
13	Toulouse Olympique	24–16	London Broncos	15 June 2025, 14:00	Stade Ernest-Wallon	M. Lynn	4,136
14	BYE
15	Hunslet	6–72	London Broncos	29 June 2025, 15:00	South Leeds Stadium	L. Bland	849
16	London Broncos	20–14	Halifax Panthers	5 July 2025, 15:00	Stonebridge Road, Ebbsfleet (Note: Match played at Ebbsfleet due to pitch works at Plough Lane.)	A. Belafonte
17	London Broncos	18–38	Doncaster	12 July 2025, 17:00	Stonebridge Road, Ebbsfleet	T. Jones
18	Sheffield Eagles	6–48	London Broncos	20 July 2025, 15:00	Steel City Stadium	M. Lynn
19	Featherstone Rovers	36–18	London Broncos	27 July 2025, 15:00	Post Office Road	R. Cox
20	London Broncos	18–10	Barrow Raiders	3 August 2025, 15:00	Plough Lane	M. Griffiths
21	London Broncos	18–24	Toulouse Olympique	10 August 2025, 13:00	Plough Lane	J. Vella
22	York Knights	42–16	London Broncos	17 August 2025, 15:00	York Community Stadium	K. Moore
23	London Broncos	18–20	Oldham	24 August 2025, 15:00	Plough Lane	T. Jones
24	Batley Bulldogs	16–30	London Broncos	30 August 2025, 15:00	Mount Pleasant	A. Belafonte	1,160
25	London Broncos	24–34	Bradford Bulls	6 September 2025, 16:00	Plough Lane	M. Griffiths
26	Widnes Vikings	10–20	London Broncos	14 September 2025, 15:00	Halton Stadium	T. Jones	2,529

=== Table ===
Pos	Team	Pld	W	D	L	PF	PA	PD	Pts	Qualification
1	York Knights (L, Y)	24	20	0	4	764	299	+465	40	Semi-finals
2	Toulouse Olympique (C)	24	19	0	5	651	314	+337	38	Semi-finals
3	Bradford Bulls	24	18	0	6	678	366	+312	36	Eliminators
4	Oldham	24	15	2	7	602	450	+152	32	Eliminators
5	Halifax Panthers	24	14	1	9	594	424	+170	29	Eliminators
6	Featherstone Rovers	24	14	0	10	640	461	+179	28	Eliminators
7	Widnes Vikings	24	11	2	11	454	475	−21	24	
8	Doncaster	24	11	0	13	528	533	−5	22	
9	Barrow Raiders	24	10	1	13	525	559	−34	21	
10	London Broncos	24	8	0	16	468	548	−80	16	
11	Sheffield Eagles	24	6	0	18	381	689	−308	12	
12	Batley Bulldogs	24	4	2	18	386	751	−365	10	
13	Hunslet	24	2	0	22	256	1058	−802	4	

Source: RFL
Rules for classification: 1) Competition points; 2) Points difference; 3) Points percentage (points scored/points conceded x 100)
(C) Champions; (L) League Leaders Shield; (Y) Runners-up

== Challenge Cup ==
Date and time	Round	Versus	H/A	Venue	Result	Score	Tries	Goals	Attendance	TV	Report
25 January; 12:30	Round 2	Goole Vikings	H	The Rock, Priory Lane	L	10–17				Our League	

== 1895 Cup ==
Date and time	Round	Versus	H/A	Venue	Result	Score	Tries	Goals	Attendance	TV	Report
1 March; 15:00	Round 1	Dewsbury Rams	H	New River Stadium	W	26–16					
6 April; 15:00	Quarter Final	Featherstone Rovers	A	Post Office Road	L	34–6					

== Squad ==
2025 London Broncos Squad
First team squad				Coaching staff
1 (Scotland) Alex Walker – FB; 2 (France) Chris Hellec – WG, CE; 3 (Italy) Ethan Natoli – SR, CE; 4 (Australia) Brandon Webster-Mansfield – CE; 5 (England) Liam Tindall – WG; 6 (Italy) Luke Polselli – SO, FB; 7 (Australia) Connor O'Beirne – SH; 8 (Wales) Huw Worthington – PR; 9 (Wales) Curtis Davies – HK; 10 (Ireland) Lewis Bienek – PR; 11 (England) Will Lovell (c) – SR; 12 (Nigeria) Sadiq Adebiyi – SR, PR; 13 (England) Marcus Stock – LF, PR	14 (Australia) Kobe Rugless – PR; 15 (England) Tom Whitehead – LF; 15 (Nigeria) Daniel Okoro – PR; 16 (England) Kian McDermott – PR; 17 (England) Jensen Monk – LF; 18 (England) Ben Hursey-Hord – PR; 19 (England) Lukas Mason – SR; 20 (Jamaica) Aaron Small – CE; 21 (Jamaica) Chris Ball – CE, SR; 22 (Wales) Matt Ross – LF, PR; 23 (Ireland) Sam Winney – PR; 24 (England) Jake Thewlis – WG; 25 (England) Zac Bardsley-Rowe – CE	26 (England) Jack Ryan – SO, SH; 26 (England) Charlie Robson – WG; 27 (England) Taylor Kerr – LF; 27 (England) Lennie Ellis – SH; 28 (England) Jenson Binks – SH; 29 (England) Alfie Johnson – WG; 30 (England) Ted Davidson – CE; 31 (England) Sam Davis – HK; 31 (Fiji) Marcus Qareqare – WG; 32 (England) Jamie Hewson – CE; 32 (England) Max Wood – PR; 33 (Ireland) Louix Gorman – CE; 33 (England) Jack Smith – WG, CE	34 (Papua New Guinea) Emmanuel Waine – SR, LF; 34 (England) Jack Farrimond – SH; 34 (England) Connor Barley – WG; 34 (England) Tommy Porter – HK; 37 (England) Kalum Rathbone – HK; 39 (England) Joe Diskin – HK; 42 (Scotland) Rob Oakley – LF, HK; -- (England) Charlie Randall; -- (England) Leighton Ball; -- (England) Tyler Kearsey; -- (England) Jerome Yates	Head coach: (England) Mike Eccles; Legend: (c) Captain(s); (vc) Vice-captain(s); Injured

== Statistics ==
Squad Number	Name	International country	Position	Age	Previous club	Appearances	Tries	Goals	Drop Goals	Points	Notes
1	Alex Walker	(Scotland)	Fullback	-	Halifax Panthers	26	8	1	0	34	
2	Christopher Hellec	(France)	Wing, Centre	-	Saint-Gaudens Bears	17	1	21	0	46	
3	Ethan Natoli	(Italy)	Second-row, Centre	-	Pia	15	5	0	0	20	
4	Brandon Webster-Mansfield	(Australia)	Centre	-	Villefranche	8	3	0	0	12	
5	Liam Tindall	(England)	Wing	-	Hull FC	23	17	0	0	68	
6	Luke Polselli	(Italy)	Stand-off, Fullback	-	Rochdale Mayfield	24	10	1	0	42	
7	Connor O'Beirne	(Australia)	Scrum-half	-	Lézignan	18	4	1	0	18	
8	Huw Worthington	(Wales)	Prop	-	Whitehaven	22	1	0	0	4	
9	Curtis Davis	(Wales)	Hooker	-	Dewsbury Rams	27	0	0	0	0	
10	Lewis Bienek	(Ireland)	Prop	-	Castleford Tigers	20	7	0	0	28	
11	Will Lovell	(England)	Second-row	-	London Skolars	25	1	0	0	4	
12	Sadiq Adebiyi	(Nigeria)	Second-row, Prop	-	Keighley Cougars	23	5	0	0	20	
13	Marcus Stock	(England)	Loose forward, Prop	-	York Knights	26	5	0	0	20	
14	Kobe Rugless	(Australia)	Prop	-	Hunslet	5	0	0	0	0	
15	Tom Whitehead	(England)	Second-row	-	Warrington Wolves	1	0	0	0	0	Loan
15	Daniel Okoro	(Nigeria)	Prop	-	Warrington Wolves	4	0	0	0	0	Loan
16	Kian McDermott	(England)	Prop	-	Wigan Warriors	9	0	0	0	0	Loan
17	Jensen Monk	(England)	Loose forward	-	London Broncos Academy	12	2	0	0	8	
18	Ben Hursey-Hord	(England)	Loose forward	-	Halifax Panthers	19	2	0	0	8	
19	Lukas Mason	(England)	Second-row	-	Wigan Warriors	10	0	0	0	0	Loan
20	Aaron Small	(Jamaica)	Centre	-	Cornwall	16	2	0	0	8	
21	Chris Ball	(Jamaica)	Centre, Second-row	-	Hammersmith Hills Hoists	7	0	0	0	0	
22	Matt Ross	(Wales)	Loose forward, Prop	-	Cornwall	18	0	0	0	0	
23	Sam Winney	(Ireland)	Prop	-	London Broncos Academy	3	0	0	0	0	
24	Jake Thewlis	(England)	Wing	-	Warrington Wolves	4	0	0	0	0	Loan
25	Zac Bardsley-Rowe	(England)	Centre	-	Warrington Wolves	1	0	0	0	0	Loan
26	Jack Ryan	(England)	Stand-off, Scrum-half	-	Hammersmith Hills Hoists	2	0	0	0	0	
26	Charlie Robson	(England)	Wing	-	Hull FC	2	1	0	0	4	
27	Taylor Kerr	(England)	Loose forward	-	Wigan Warriors	7	1	0	0	4	Loan
27	Lennie Ellis	(England)	Scrum-half	-	Hull Kingston Rovers	2	0	0	0	0	Loan
28	Jenson Binks	(England)	Scrum-half	-	London Broncos Academy	10	0	0	0	0	
29	Alfie Johnson	(England)	Wing	-	Warrington Wolves	1	0	0	0	0	Loan
30	Ted Davidson	(England)	Centre	-	London Broncos Academy	3	0	0	0	0	
31	Sam Davis	(England)	Hooker	-	Salford Red Devils	1	0	0	0	0	Loan
31	Marcus Qareqare	(Fiji)	Wing	-	Leeds Rhinos	1	0	0	0	0	Loan
32	Jamie Hewson	(England)	Centre	-	London Broncos Academy	0	0	0	0	0	
32	Max Wood	(England)	Prop	-	Warrington Wolves	1	0	0	0	0	Loan
33	Louix Gorman	(England)	Centre	-	Hull Kingston Rovers	8	5	1	0	22	Loan
33	Jack Smith	(England)	Wing, Centre	-	Leeds Rhinos	14	5	49	0	118	Loan
34	Emmanuel Waine	(Papua New Guinea)	Second-row	-	Bradford Bulls	2	0	0	0	0	Loan
34	Jack Farrimond	(England)	Scrum-half	-	Wigan Warriors	1	2	1	0	10	Loan
34	Connor Barley	(England)	Wing	-	Hull Kingston Rovers	3	1	0	0	4	Loan
34	Tommy Porter	(England)	Hooker	-	Swinton Lions	9	2	0	0	8	
37	Kalum Rathbone	(England)	Hooker	-	Wigan Warriors	1	0	0	0	0	Loan
39	Joe Diskin	(England)	Hooker	-	Leeds Rhinos	1	0	0	0	0	Loan
42	Rob Oakley	(Scotland)	Loose forward, Hooker	-	London Broncos Academy	1	0	0	0	0	End of drugs ban
--	Leighton Ball	(England)	Wing	-	London Skolars	1	0	0	0	0	
--	Jerome Yates	(England)	Wing	-	London Skolars	1	0	0	0	0	

== Player appearances ==
No	Player	2 CC	1	2	1R 1985	4	5	QF 1895	6	7	8	9	10	11	12	13	15	16	17	18	19	20	21	22	23	24	25	26
1	Alex Walker	FB	FB	FB	FB	FB	FB	FB	FB	FB	SO	SO	SH	SO	SO	SO	SO	SO	SO	SO	SO	FB	FB		FB	FB	FB	FB
2	Chris Hellec		WG	CE	CE	CE	CE	WG	WG	WG	WG	WG	WG	WG						SUB			SUB	FB	CE	CE		
3	Ethan Natoli													SR	SR	SR	SR	SR	SR	SR	SR	CE	CE	CE	CE	SR	CE	CE
4	Brandon Webster-Mansfield															CE	CE	CE	CE	CE	CE						CE	CE
5	Liam Tindall			WG	WG	WG	WG	WG	WG	WG	WG	WG	WG	WG		SUB	WG	WG	WG	WG	WG	WG	WG		WG	WG	WG	WG
6	Luke Polselli	SUB	SO	SO	SO	SO	SO	SO	SO	SO	FB	FB	FB	FB	FB	FB	FB	FB	FB	FB	FB				SO	SO	SO	SO
7	Connor O'Beirne	SH	SH	SH	SH	Sent to blood bin	Sent to blood bin	Sent to blood bin	Sent to blood bin	Sent to blood bin	Sent to blood bin	Sent to blood bin	SUB			SH	SH	SH	SH	SH	SH	SH	SH	SH	SH	SH	SH	SH
8	Huw Worthington	PR	SUB	SUB	SUB	SUB	PR	PR	B	B	PR	SUB		PR	PR	PR	PR		SUB	SUB		SUB	SUB	SUB	PR	SUB		
9	Curtis Davies	HK	HK	HK	HK	HK	HK	HK	HK	HK	HK	HK	HK	HK	HK	HK	HK	HK	HK	HK	HK	HK	HK	HK	HK	HK	HK	HK
10	Lewis Bienek	PR	PR	PR	PR	PR		SUB	PR	PR	PR						SUB	PR	PR	PR	PR	PR	PR		SUB	PR	PR	PR
11	Will Lovell	SR	SR	SR	SR	SR	SR	SR	SR	SR	SR	SR	SR	SR	SR	SR	SR	SR	SR	SR	SR	SR	SR	SR			SR	SR
12	Sadiq Adebiyi	SR	SR	SR	SUB	SR		SR	SR	SR	SR	PR	PR	PR	PR		PR	PR	PR	PR	PR	SR	SR	SR	SR		SR	
13	Marcus Stock		LF	LF	LF	PR	PR	PR	LF	LF	LF	LF	LF	LF	LF	LF	LF	LF	LF	LF	LF	LF	LF	LF	LF	LF	LF	LF
14	Kobe Rugless																							PR	PR	PR	PR	SUB
15	Tom Whitehead						LF																					
15	Daniel Okoro																				SUB	PR	PR	PR	Sent to blood bin	Sent to blood bin	Sent to blood bin	Sent to blood bin
16	Kian McDermott	SUB	PR	PR	PR	SUB						PR	PR			PR			SUB									
17	Jenson Monk	LF	SUB	SUB		SUB	SUB		SUB	SUB	SH			SUB												SUB	SUB	PR
18	Ben Hursey-Hord	SUB					SR		PR	PR	SUB		SUB	SUB	SUB	SUB	SUB	SUB	SUB	SUB	SUB	SUB	SUB	SUB	SR		SUB	
19	Lukas Mason		SUB	SUB	SR	SUB		SUB				SR	SR			SUB										SR		SR
20	Aaron Small	CE	CE	CE	CE	CE	CE	CE	CE			CE	CE	CE	CE	CE		CE			CE	CE						
21	Chris Ball	CE					SUB	CE	CE	CE	CE			SUB														
22	Matt Ross	SUB	SUB				SUB	SUB	SUB	SUB	SUB	SUB	SUB	SUB	SUB	SUB	SUB	SUB			SUB			SUB	SUB			SUB
23	Sam Winney						SUB		SUB	SUB																		
24	Jake Thewlis		WG	WG	WG	WG																						
25	Zac Bardsley-Rowe		CE																									
26	Jack Ryan	SO			SUB																							
26	Charlie Robson																						WG	WG				
27	Taylor Kerr			SUB	SUB	LF		LF					SUB				SUB		SUB									
27	Lennie Ellis											SH			SH													
28	Jenson Binks					SH	SH	SH	SH	SH		SUB		SH								SO	SO	SO				
29	Alfie Johnson						WG	Sent to blood bin																				
30	Ted Davidson										SUB															CE	SUB	
31	Sam Davis							SUB																				
31	Marcus Qareqare																							WG				
33	Jack Smith														WG	WG	WG	WG	WG	WG	WG	WG	CE	CE	WG	WG	WG	WG
32	Max Wood																								SUB			
33	Louix Gorman									CE	CE	CE	CE		CE		CE		CE	CE								
34	Emmanuel Waine										SUB	SUB																
34	Jack Farrimond												SO															
34	Connor Barley													CE	WG	WG												
34	Tommy Porter																			SUB	SUB	SUB	SUB	SUB	SUB	SUB	SUB	SUB
37	Kalum Rathbone														SUB													
39	Joe Diskin																	SUB										
42	Rob Oakley																										x	SUB
x	Jerome Yates	WG																										
x	Leighton Ball	WG																										
