= Sam Davis (rugby league) =

British rugby league footballer

Personal information
- Full name: Samuel Davis
- Born: 11 November 1998 (age 28) Burbage, Leicestershire, England
- Height: 5 ft 8 in (1.73 m)
- Weight: 13 st 12 lb (88 kg)

Playing information
- Position: Hooker
Club
Years	Team	Pld	T	G	FG	P
2017–21	London Broncos	29	2	0	0	8
2017(loan)	→ Coventry Bears	1	1	0	0	4
2018(loan)	→ Coventry Bears	4	0	0	0	0
2019(loan)	→ Coventry Bears	12	6	0	0	24
2022	York City Knights	8	1	0	0	4
2022(loan)	→ London Broncos	13	0	0	0	0
2023–24	London Broncos	52	3	0	0	12
2025	Salford Red Devils	9	0	0	0	0
2025(DR)	→ London Broncos	1	0	0	0	0
2026–	London Broncos	17	2	0	0	8
	Total	146	15	0	0	60
- Source: As of 19 November 2026
- Relatives: Matt Davis (brother)

Sam Davis (born 11 November 1998) is a professional rugby league footballer who plays as a hooker for the London Broncos in the Super League.

He has previously played for London in the Championship and the Super League, and spent time on loan from the Broncos at the Coventry Bears in League 1. Davis has also previously played for the Salford Red Devils in the Super League and the York City Knights in the RFL Championship. He has spent time on loan at the London Broncos in the second tier.

== Background ==
He is the younger brother of Matt Davis who last played for the Warrington Wolves in the Super League. He attended Hastings High School and the well known rugby school John Cleveland College.

== Career ==
=== London Broncos ===
In 2018 Davis made his professional debut for the London Broncos against the Barrow Raiders in the Championship.

=== York City Knights ===
On 14 October 2021 it was reported that he had signed for the York City Knights in the RFL Championship.

=== London Broncos ===
On 15 October 2023, Davis played in the London Broncos upset Million Pound Game victory over Toulouse Olympique.

=== Salford Red Devils ===
On 9 October 2024, Davis signed a two-year contract with Salford Red Devils in the Super League

=== London Broncos (DR) ===
On 4 April 2025 it was reported that he had signed for London Broncos in the RFL Championship on DR loan

=== London Broncos new era ===
In August 2026, he was part of the Broncos squad that lifted the RFL Championship Leaders' Shield.

In October 2026, he played in the Broncos Championship Grand Final victory over Doncaster at Plough Lane.

In 2026 he was part of the London Broncos squad that secured their historic treble of League Leaders' Shield, 1895 Cup and Grand Final victories.

== Club statistics ==
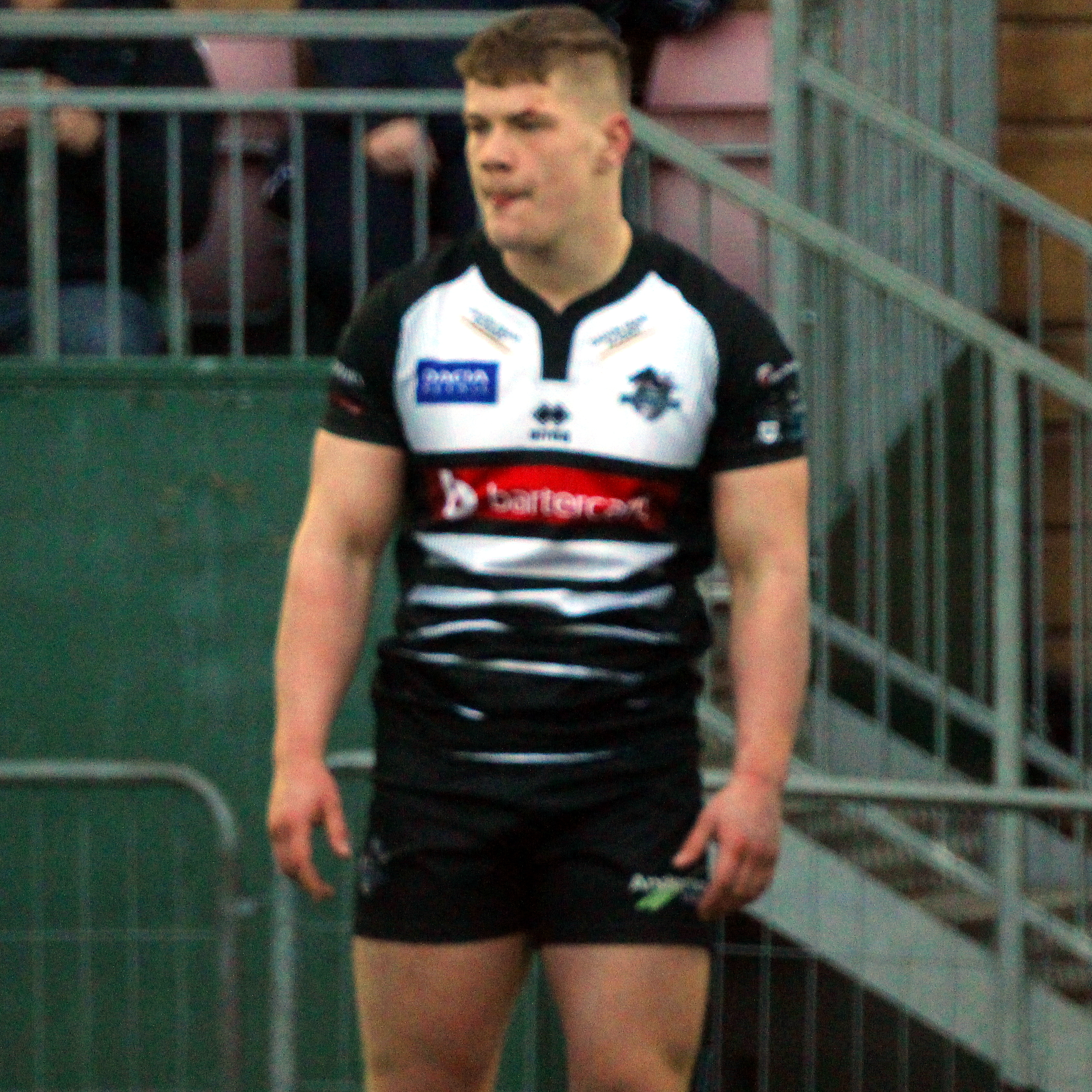
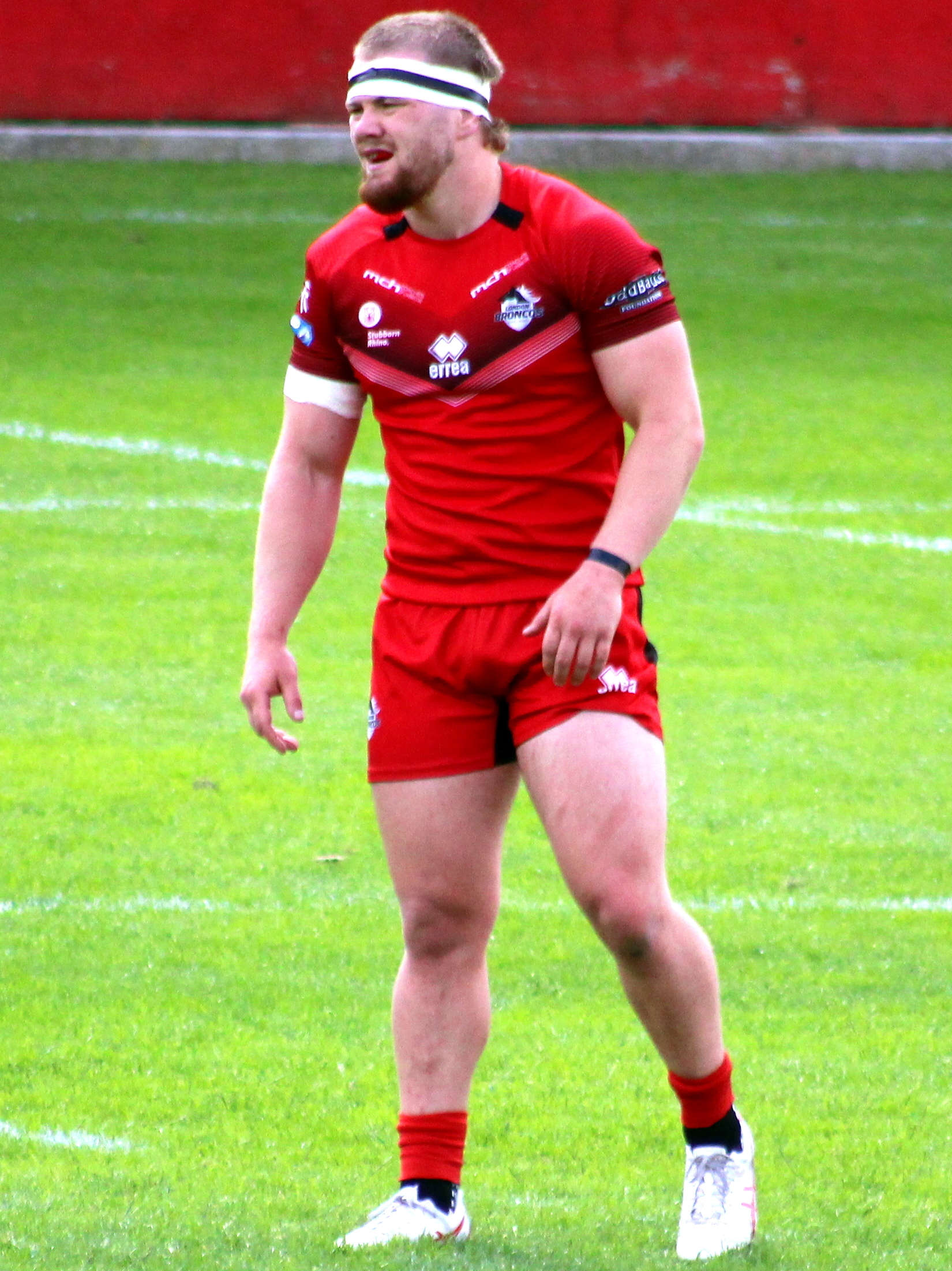
Sam Davis in action for the London Broncos

Year	Club	League Competition	Appearances	Tries	Goals	Drop goals	Points	Notes
2017	London Broncos	2017 RFL Championship	0	0	0	0	0	
2017	→ Coventry Bears	2017 RFL League 1	1	1	0	0	4	loan
2018	London Broncos	2018 RFL Championship	10	1	0	0	4	
2018	→ Coventry Bears	2018 RFL League 1	4	0	0	0	0	loan
2019	London Broncos	2019 Super League	3	0	0	0	0	
2019	→ Coventry Bears	2019 RFL League 1	12	6	0	0	24	loan
2020	London Broncos	2020 RFL Championship	6	0	0	0	0	
2021	London Broncos	2021 RFL Championship	10	1	0	0	4	
2022	York City Knights	2022 RFL Championship	8	1	0	0	4	
2022	→ London Broncos	2022 RFL Championship	13	0	0	0	0	loan
2023	London Broncos	2023 RFL Championship	29	0	0	0	0	
2024	London Broncos	2024 Super League	23	3	0	0	12	
2025	Salford Red Devils	2025 Super League	9	0	0	0	0	
2025	→ London Broncos	2026 RFL Championship	1	0	0	0	0	loan
2026	London Broncos	2026 RFL Championship	17	2	0	0	8	
2027	London Broncos	2027 Super League						
Club career total			146	15	0	0	60	
