= Marcus Stock (rugby league) =

English rugby league footballer

Personal information
- Full name: Marcus Stock
- Born: 1 May 1996 (age 30) Milton Keynes, Buckinghamshire, England
- Height: 6 ft 0 in (1.83 m)
- Weight: 15 st 10 lb (100 kg)

Playing information
- Position: Second-row, Loose forward, Prop
Club
Years	Team	Pld	T	G	FG	P
2016–18	Hemel Stags	32	3	0	0	12
2019–22	York City Knights	78	18	0	0	72
2019(loan)	→ Coventry Bears	1	0	0	0	0
2023–	London Broncos	109	21	0	0	84
	Total	220	42	0	0	168
- Source: As of 19 November 2026

Marcus Stock (born 1 May 1996) is an English professional rugby league footballer who plays as a second-row, loose forward and prop for the London Broncos in the Super League.

He previously played for the Hemel Stags in League 1, the York City Knights in the Championship, and on loan from York at the Coventry Bears in League 1. He also represented the London Padel team with his great friend Lionel Jefferson in 2025.

== Background ==
Stock was born in Milton Keynes, Buckinghamshire, England.

He represented England at Student level.

== Playing career ==
Stock joined the Hemel Stags first team squad at the start of the 2016 RFL League season. He made his debut for Hemel in 2016 against the South Wales Scorpions.

He joined the York City Knights first team squad at the start of the 2019 season. He made his professional debut for York in 2019 against the Dewsbury Rams.

Stock spent time on loan from York at the Coventry Bears in League 1.

He joined the London first team squad at the start of the 2023 season. He made his professional debut for the Broncos in 2023 against the Batley Bulldogs.

On 15 October 2023, Stock played in the Championship Grand Final victory against Toulouse Olympique in France.

In August 2026, he was part of the Broncos squad that lifted the RFL Championship Leaders' Shield.

In 2026 he was part of the London Broncos squad that secured their historic treble of League Leaders' Shield, 1895 Cup and Grand Final victories.

== Club statistics ==
Year	Club	League Competition	Appearances	Tries	Goals	Drop goals	Points	Notes
2016	Hemel Stags	2016 RFL League 1	9	0	0	0	0	
2017	Hemel Stags	2017 RFL League 1	0	0	0	0	0	
2018	Hemel Stags	2018 RFL League 1	23	3	0	0	12	
2019	York City Knights	2019 RFL Championship	31	8	0	0	32	
2019	→ Coventry Bears	2019 RFL League 1	1	0	0	0	0	loan
2020	York City Knights	2020 RFL Championship	6	2	0	0	8	
2021	York City Knights	2021 RFL Championship	21	4	0	0	16	
2022	York City Knights	2022 RFL Championship	22	5	0	0	20	
2023	London Broncos	2023 RFL Championship	33	5	0	0	20	
2024	London Broncos	2024 Super League	28	2	0	0	8	
2025	London Broncos	2025 RFL Championship	26	5	0	0	20	
2026	London Broncos	2026 RFL Championship	22	9	0	0	36	
2027	London Broncos	2027 Super League						
Club career total			220	42	0	0	168	
