= Jacob Jones (rugby league) =

English rugby league footballer (born 1999)

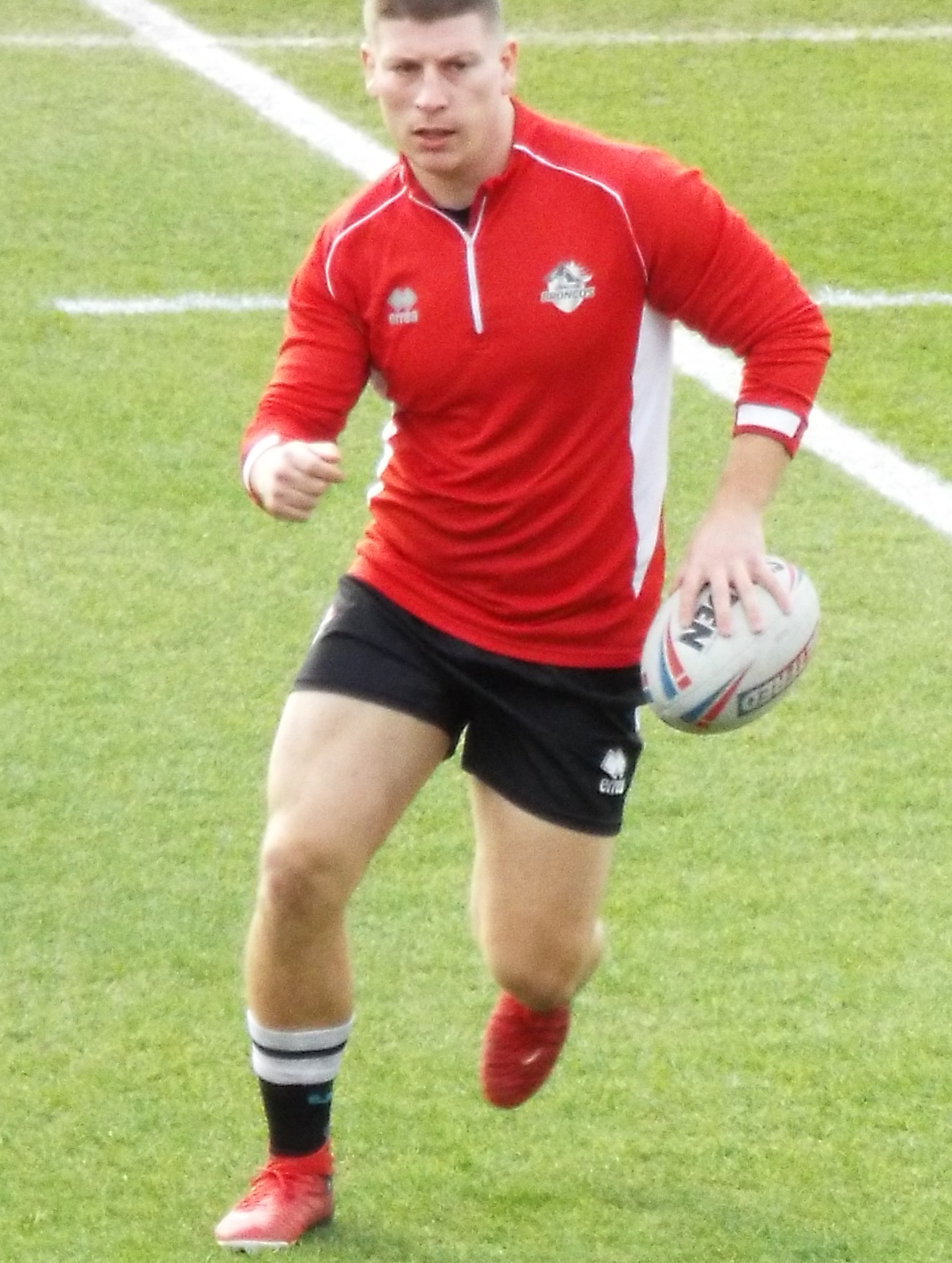

Personal information
- Full name: Jacob Jones
- Born: 15 February 1999 (age 27) Birmingham, West Midlands, England
- Height: 5 ft 11 in (1.80 m)
- Weight: 15 st 8 lb (99 kg)

Playing information
- Position: Second-row
Club
Years	Team	Pld	T	G	FG	P
2017–18	London Broncos	0	0	0	0	0
2017(loan)	→ Coventry Bears	3	0	0	0	0
2018(loan)	→ Coventry Bears	1	0	0	0	0
2019–20	Coventry Bears	20	7	0	0	28
2021	London Broncos	20	5	0	0	20
2022–24	Leigh Leopards	15	1	0	0	4
2023(loan)	→ Widnes Vikings	7	0	0	0	0
2023(loan)	→ Rochdale Hornets	2	0	0	0	0
2023(loan)	→ London Broncos	4	0	0	0	0
2024(loan)	→ London Broncos	25	2	0	0	8
2025–	Doncaster	27	3	0	0	12
	Total	124	18	0	0	72
- Source: As of 17 February 2026

Jacob Jones (born 15 February 1999) is an English professional rugby league footballer who plays as a second-row forward for Doncaster in the RFL Championship.

He previously played for the London Broncos in the Championship. He spent time on loan from the Broncos at the Coventry Bears in League 1, and later joined Coventry on a permanent basis. He has spent time on loan from Leigh playing for the Widnes Vikings and London in the Championship, as well as the Rochdale Hornets in League 1.

== Background ==
Jones was born in Birmingham in England. He attended Loughborough College.

He played for the Birmingham Bulldogs, Crosfields ARLFC and the Midlands Hurricanes as a junior.

== Playing career ==
=== London Broncos ===
Jones joined the London Broncos at the start of the 2017 season.

=== Coventry Bears ===
Jones spent time on loan from London at League 1 club Coventry Bears in 2017. He again played for Coventry on loan from the Broncos in 2018.

He joined the Coventry Bears on a full-time basis ahead of the 2019 season whilst studying at Loughborough University. He played for England Universities. He was nominated for the League One young player of the year award at the end of the season.

Jones was offered another contract at the end of the 2020 season, but left to join the full-time professional London Broncos.

=== London Broncos ===
Jones joined the London Broncos first-team squad for the 2021 season. He made his debut for the Broncos in 2021 against the Keighley Cougars.

=== Leigh Leopards ===
He joined the Leigh Centurions for the 2022 season.

=== Widnes Vikings ===
Jones spent time on loan from the renamed Leigh Leopards in 2023 at the Widnes Vikings in the Championship.

=== Rochdale Hornets ===
He played for the Rochdale Hornets on loan from Leigh in 2023.

=== London Broncos ===
He spent time on loan from the Leopards in 2023 at the London Broncos in the Championship.

Jones returned on loan to the Broncos at the start of the 2024 Super League season. He made his Super League début against the Catalans Dragons.

=== Doncaster RLFC ===
In November 2024 he signed for Doncaster in the RFL Championship on a one-year deal.
