= Sadiq Adebiyi =

Nigeria international rugby league footballer

Sid Adebiyi

Personal information
- Full name: Sadiq Adebiyi
- Born: 8 January 1997 (age 29) Lagos, Nigeria
- Height: 5 ft 10 in (1.78 m)
- Weight: 16 st 1 lb (102 kg)

Playing information
- Position: Loose forward, Second-row, Prop
Club
Years	Team	Pld	T	G	FG	P
2015–21	London Broncos	47	11	0	0	44
2016(loan)	→ Hemel Stags	2	0	0	0	0
2016(loan)	→ Oxford	3	1	0	0	4
2017(loan)	→ London Skolars	8	6	0	0	24
2017(loan)	→ Oxford	1	0	0	0	0
2017(loan)	→ Oldham	11	1	0	0	4
2018(loan)	→ London Skolars	1	0	0	0	0
2019(DR)	→ Sheffield Eagles	3	0	0	0	0
2022	Wakefield Trinity	3	0	0	0	0
2022(loan)	→ Newcastle Thunder	2	0	0	0	0
2023	Keighley Cougars	25	1	0	0	4
2024–	London Broncos	63	12	0	0	48
	Total	169	32	0	0	128
Representative
Years	Team	Pld	T	G	FG	P
2019	Nigeria	2	3	0	0	12
- Source: As of 15 September 2026

Sadiq Adebiyi (born 8 January 1997) is a Nigerian professional rugby league footballer who plays as a loose forward, second-row or prop for the London Broncos in the Super League and Nigeria at international level.

Adebiyi played for London Broncos between 2015 and 2021 with loan spells at Hemel Stags, Oxford and London Skolars in League 1, and Oldham and the Sheffield Eagles in the Championship.

== Background ==
Adebiyi was born in Lagos, Nigeria.

== Playing career ==
=== London Broncos ===
Adebiyi made his debut for the Broncos in 2015 and was a member of the first team squad from 2017 until 2021.

He spent time loan from the Broncos at the Hemel Stags, Oxford and the London Skolars in League 1.

Adebiyi also spent time loan from London at Oldham and the Sheffield Eagles in the Championship.

Injuries and the COVID-19 pandemic limited his opportunities in 2020 and 2021. In 2020 he suffered a pectoral injury that ruled him out for several months.

In 2021, Adebiyi ruptured his Achilles tendon and missed most of the Championship season.

During the time at London he made 49 appearances scoring 11 tries.

=== Wakefield Trinity ===
On 15 October 2021 Adebiyi signed for Wakefield Trinity in the Super League. During the 2022 season he made three appearances for Trinity.

He spent time on loan at the Wakefield at the Newcastle Thunder in the RFL Championship.

=== Keighley Cougars ===
Adebiyi joined Keighley on a two-year deal in October 2022.

=== London Broncos (rejoin) ===
On 27 October 2023 it was reported that he would re-join the London Broncos for the 2024 season on a two-year deal.

In August 2026, he was part of the Broncos squad that lifted the RFL Championship Leaders' Shield.

He played in London's 1895 Cup Final victory over the Widnes Vikings at the Halliwell Jones Stadium in August 2026.

In 2026 he was part of the London Broncos squad that secured their historic treble of League Leaders' Shield, 1895 Cup and Grand Final victories.

== International ==
Adebiyi represented Nigeria twice in 2019 captaining his national team as they won the MEA Championship.

== Club statistics ==
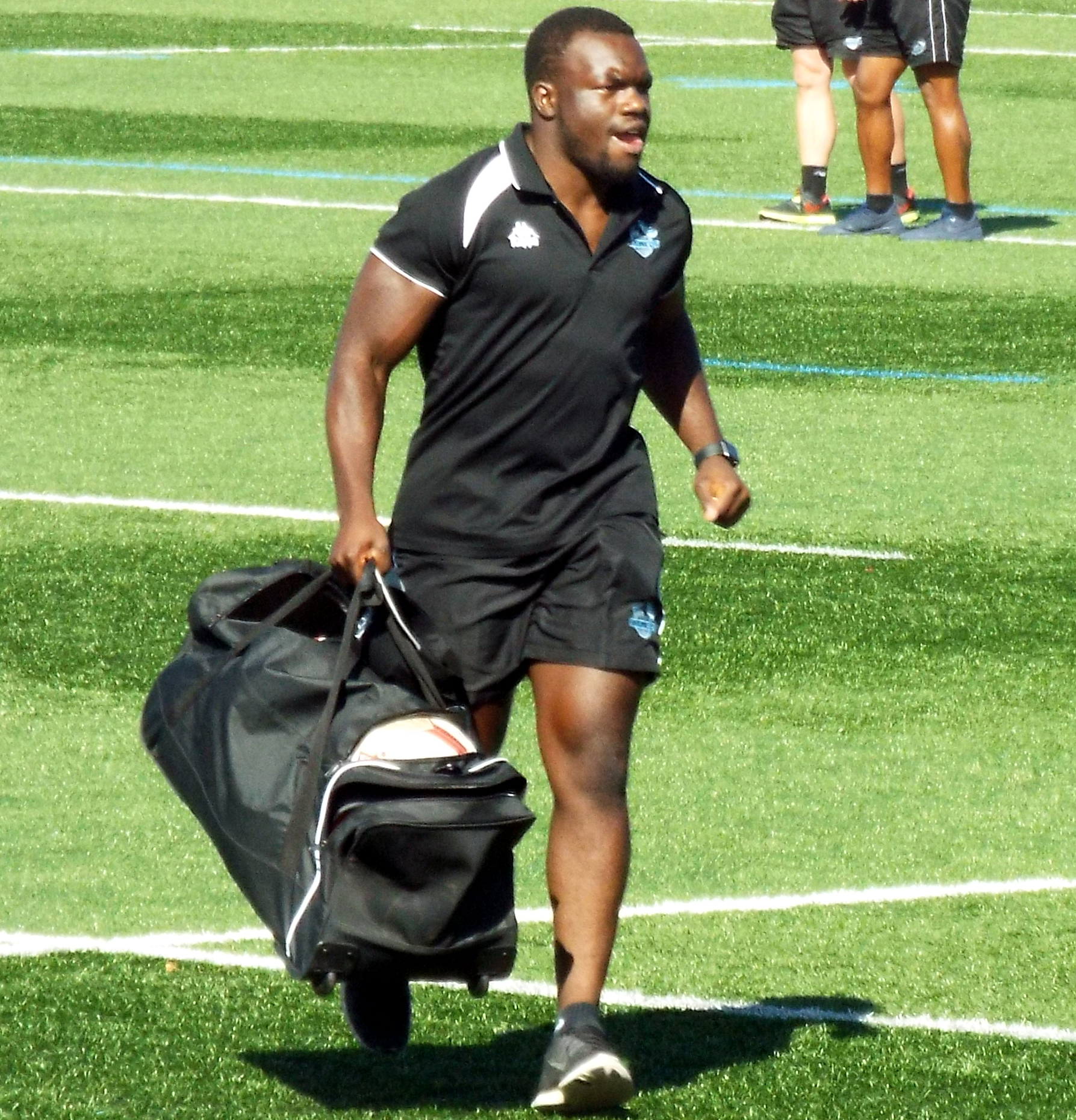
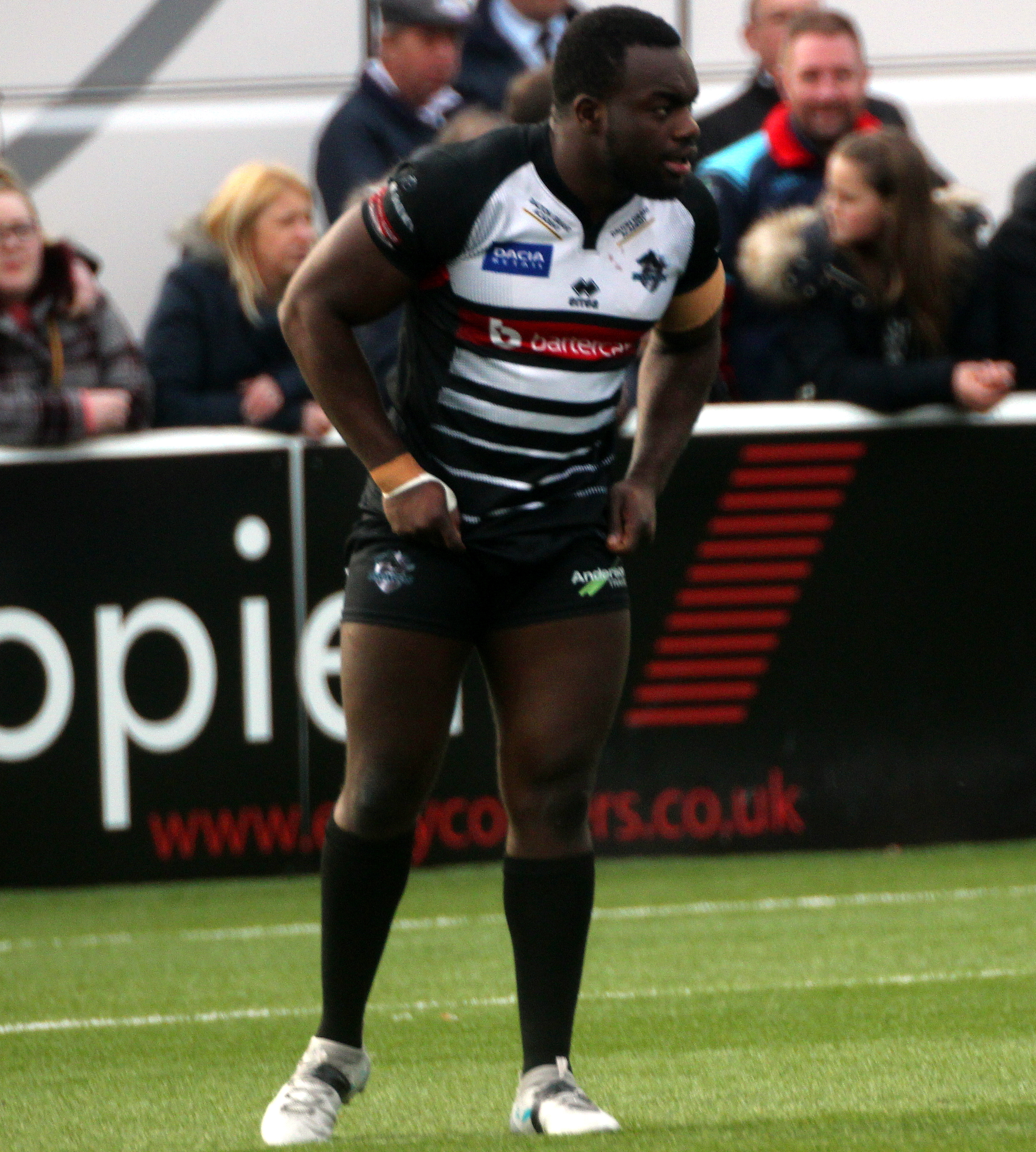
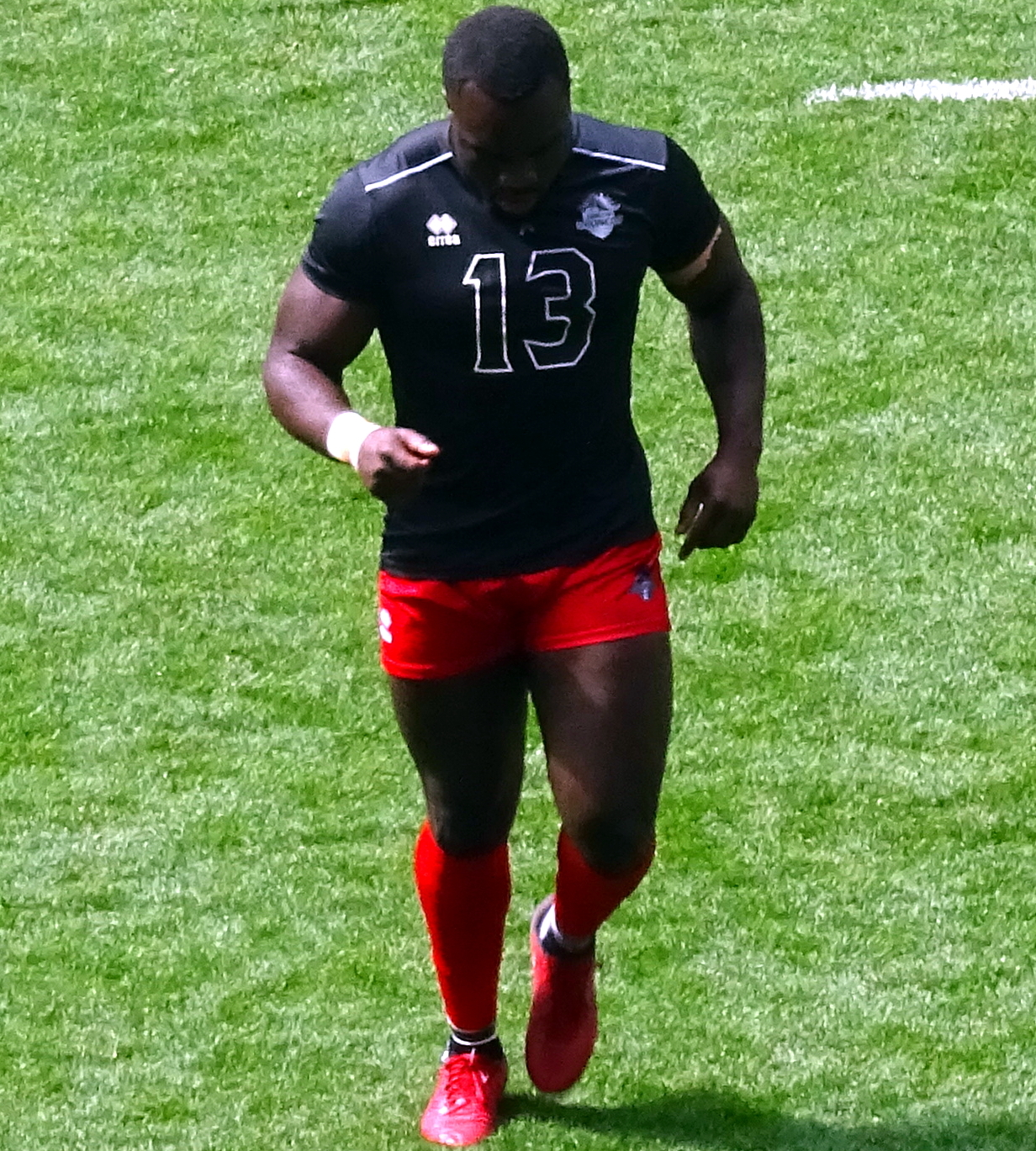
Sid Adebiyi in action for the London Broncos

Year	Club	League Competition	Appearances	Tries	Goals	Drop goals	Points	Notes
2015	London Broncos	2015 RFL Championship	4	2	0	0	8	
2016	London Broncos	2016 RFL Championship	1	1	0	0	4	
2016	Hemel Stags	2016 RFL League 1	2	0	0	0	0	loan
2016	Oxford	2016 RFL League 1	3	1	0	0	4	loan
2017	London Broncos	2017 RFL Championship	5	0	0	0	0	
2017	London Skolars	2017 RFL League 1	8	6	0	0	24	loan
2017	Oxford	2017 RFL League 1	1	0	0	0	0	loan
2017	Oldham	2017 RFL Championship	11	1	0	0	4	loan
2018	London Broncos	2018 RFL Championship	20	4	0	0	16	
2018	London Skolars	2018 RFL League 1	1	0	0	0	0	loan
2019	London Broncos	2019 Super League	13	3	0	0	12	
2019	Sheffield Eagles	2019 RFL Championship	3	0	0	0	0	loan
2020	London Broncos	2020 RFL Championship	1	0	0	0	0	
2021	London Broncos	2021 RFL Championship	3	1	0	0	4	
2022	Wakefield Trinity	Super League	3	0	0	0	0	
2022	Newcastle Thunder	2022 RFL Championship	2	0	0	0	0	loan
2023	Keighley Cougars	2023 RFL Championship	25	1	0	0	4	
2024	London Broncos	2024 Super League	21	1	0	0	4	
2025	London Broncos	2025 RFL Championship	23	5	0	0	20	
2026	London Broncos	2026 RFL Championship	19	6	0	0	24	
Club career total			169	32	0	0	128	
