= Keith Mason (rugby league) =

Wales international rugby league footballer and actor

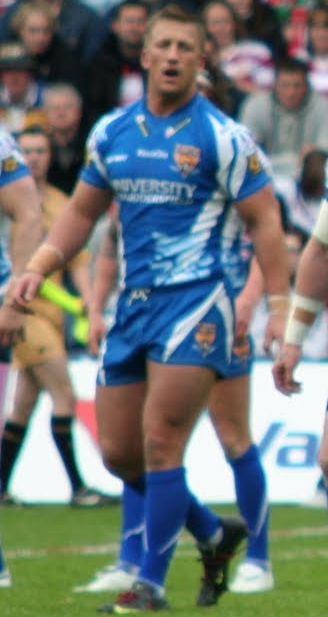

Personal information
- Full name: Keith Luke Mason
- Born: 20 January 1982 (age 44) Dewsbury, West Yorkshire, England

Playing information
- Height: 6 ft 2 in (1.88 m)
- Weight: 16 st 3 lb (103 kg)
- Position: Prop
Club
Years	Team	Pld	T	G	FG	P
2000–01	Wakefield Trinity Wildcats	23	0	0	0	0
2002–03	Melbourne Storm	4	0	0	0	0
2003–05	St Helens	63	4	0	0	16
2006	Castleford Tigers	2	0	0	0	0
2006–12	Huddersfield Giants	149	5	0	0	20
2013	Castleford Tigers	16	0	0	0	0
	Total	257	9	0	0	36
Representative
Years	Team	Pld	T	G	FG	P
2001–02	Wales	2	0	0	0	0
- Relatives: Lukas Mason (son)

Keith Mason (born 20 January 1982) is a former rugby league footballer who played in the 2000s and 2010s.

He played as a prop for Wakefield Trinity Wildcats, St Helens, Castleford Tigers (two spells) and Huddersfield Giants, as well as Brisbane Norths, and for Melbourne Storm in the National Rugby League (NRL). Mason played in three Challenge Cup finals, winning one in 2004 for St Helens against Wigan in Cardiff. He also won the League Leaders' Shield with St Helens in 2005.

He won two caps for Wales at international level, and also played for Great Britain and England Under-21s.

== Background ==
Mason was born Dewsbury, West Yorkshire, England.

His son Lukas Mason is a professional rugby league footballer who plays for the Wigan Warriors in the Super League.

== Club career ==
In a 14-year career Mason played for four Super League teams; the Wakefield Trinity Wildcats, St Helens, the Castleford Tigers, and the Huddersfield Giants, as well as playing in the NRL for two seasons with Melbourne Storm.

In 2009 Mason won the 'Coaches' Player of The Year', the 'Directors' Player of The Year', and the Huddersfield Giants 'Man of Steel Award', he also appeared in a Challenge Cup final in the same year at the Wembley Stadium against Warrington Wolves, a boyhood dream come true for Mason, also appearing in 2 more Challenge Cup finals in 2004 which he won for St Helens against Wigan at the Millennium Stadium playing prop.

== International honours ==
Keith Mason won caps for Wales while at Wakefield Trinity Wildcats in 2001 against England, and while at Melbourne Storm in 2002 against New Zealand in 2002. He also represented England at under-21 level on the tour to South Africa in 2001.

== Acting career ==
At the end of the 2013 season, Mason retired from playing rugby league in order to pursue a career as an actor. He appeared in the film Skin Traffik alongside Mickey Rourke and Daryl Hannah, and has subsequently appeared in the TV series Peaky Blinders.

In 2021 he starred in, and produced, his first feature film, Imperative.

== Political career ==
Mason is a member of the Workers Party of Britain, and stood for the party in the Wakefield and Rothwell constituency at the 2024 general election.

He received 705 votes (1.7%) finishing in third to last place. During the election campaign, he was briefly suspended before being reinstated.
