= Gideon Boafo =

English rugby league footballer

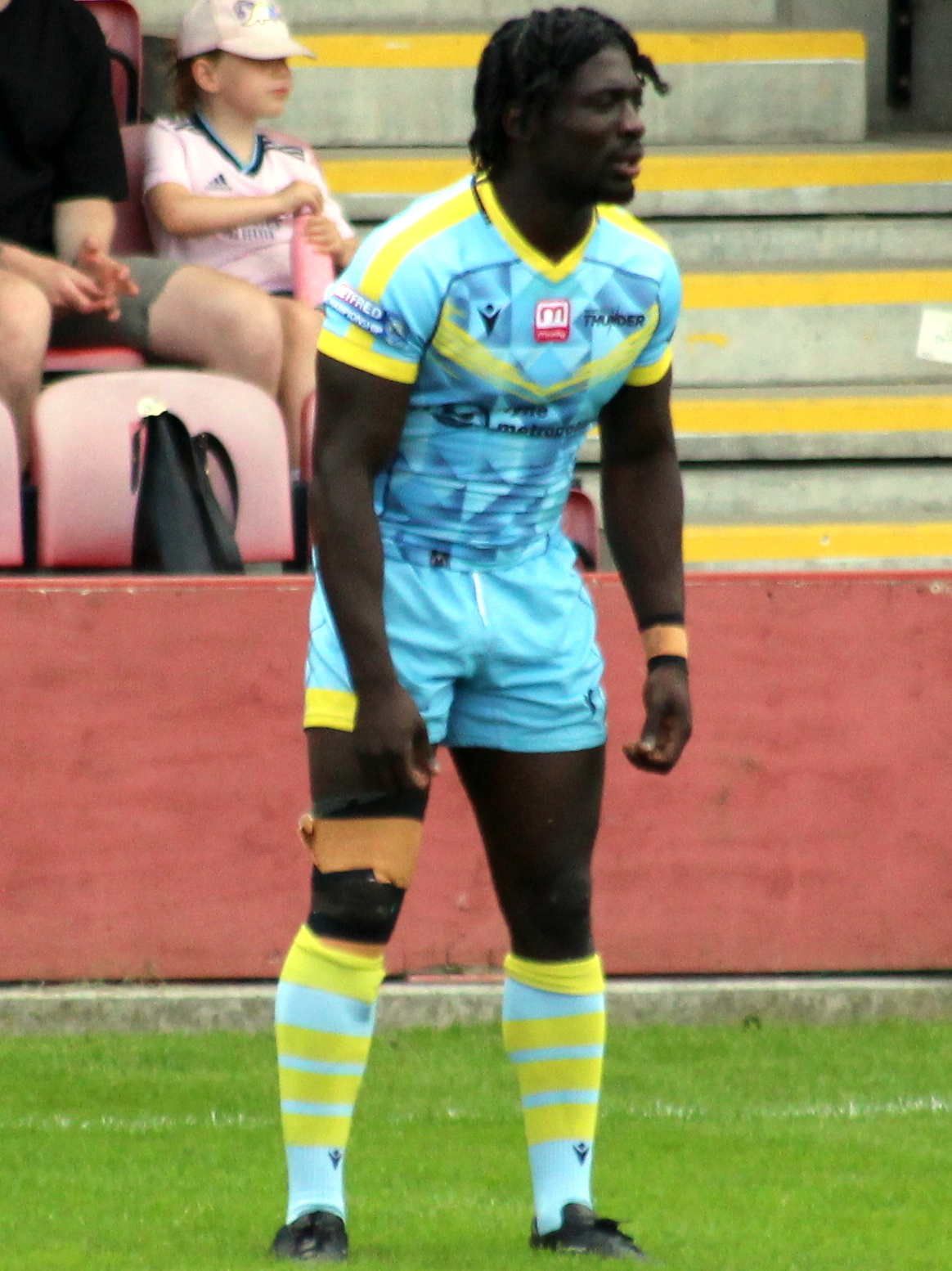

Personal information
- Full name: Gideon Boafo
- Born: 10 February 1999 (age 27) Croydon, London, England
- Height: 5 ft 11 in (1.80 m)
- Weight: 13 st 12 lb (88 kg)

Playing information
- Position: Wing
Club
Years	Team	Pld	T	G	FG	P
2019–21	London Broncos	13	16	0	0	64
2019(loan)	→ London Skolars	2	0	0	0	0
2022–23	Newcastle Thunder	44	22	0	0	88
2024	London Broncos	2	0	0	0	0
2024(loan)	→Whitehaven RLFC	2	2	0	0	8
	Total	63	40	0	0	160
- Source: As of 16 February 2026

Gideon Boafo (born 10 February 1999) is an English professional rugby league footballer who plays as a winger, most recently for the London Broncos in the Super League.

He has previously played for the Newcastle Thunder in the Championship as well as previously playing for the London Broncos. He spent time on loan from the Broncos at the London Skolars in League 1.

== Background ==
Boafo was born in Croydon, London, England. He is of Ghanaian heritage.

He played for the Croydon Hurricanes as a junior.

== Playing career ==
=== London Broncos ===
Boafo joined the London Broncos first team squad at the start of the 2019 season.

=== London Skolars ===
He spent time on loan from London in 2019 at the London Skolars in League 1.

Boafo made his professional debut for the London Broncos in 2021 against the Keighley Cougars.

=== Newcastle Thunder ===
He joined the Newcastle Thunder ahead of the 2022 season. He was rewarded with another contract for the 2023 season.

=== London Broncos (rejoin) ===
On 10 November 2023, it was reported that he had returned to the London Broncos for 2024.

=== Whitehaven R.L.F.C. (loan) ===
On 20 Jun 2024 it was reported that he had signed for Whitehaven RLFC in the RFL Championship on loan
