= Lukas Mason =

English professional rugby league footballer

Personal information
- Full name: Lukas Mason
- Born: 22 December 2005 (age 20) St Helens, Merseyside, England
- Height: 6 ft 2 in (1.88 m)
- Weight: 14 st 13 lb (95 kg)

Playing information
- Position: Second-row
Club
Years	Team	Pld	T	G	FG	P
2025–26	Wigan Warriors	3	0	0	0	0
2025(loan)	→ London Broncos	10	0	0	0	0
2025(loan)	→ Oldham	1	0	0	0	0
2026(loan)	→ Rochdale Hornets	1	0	0	0	0
2026(loan)	→ Salford	1	0	0	0	0
2026(loan)	→ Oldham	1	0	0	0	0
2027–	St Helens	0	0	0	0	0
	Total	17	0	0	0	0
- Source: As of 16 November 2026
- Education: Rainford High School
- Father: Keith Mason

Lukas Mason (born 22 December 2005) is an English professional rugby league footballer who plays as a second-row forward for St Helens in the Betfred Super League.

He has spent time on loan from Wigan at the London Broncos, Oldham, Salford and the Rochdale Hornets in the RFL Championship.

== Background ==
Mason was born in St Helens, Merseyside, England. His father Keith Mason is a former professional rugby league footballer.

He played for Clock Face Miners, Orrell St James and Siddal A.R.L.F.C. as a junior.

Mason attended Rainford High School.

== Career ==
=== Wigan Warriors ===
Mason joined the Wigan system aged 14, was playing for their Scholarship side in 2022 and was playing for the Wigan Warriors Academy side within a year, aged just 16. He later joined the first team squad ahead of the 2025 season.

=== London Broncos (loan) ===
He made his professional debut in February 2025 on loan at the London Broncos against the Bradford Bulls in the Betfred Championship.

=== Oldham RLFC (loan) ===
In May 2025 Mason was loaned out by Wigan to Oldham.

=== Salford RLFC (loan) ===
In February 2026 he was loaned out by the Warriors to Salford.

=== Rochdale Hornets (loan) ===
In March 2026 he was joined the Rochdale Hornets in the RFL Championship, on loan from Wigan.

=== Oldham RLFC (loan) ===
On 21 August 2026 it was reported that he had signed for Oldham RLFC in the RFL Championship on loan until the end of the 2026 season

=== St Helens RFC ===
On 16 November 2026 it was reported that he had signed for St Helens in the Super League
