= Connor Barley =

English rugby league footballer

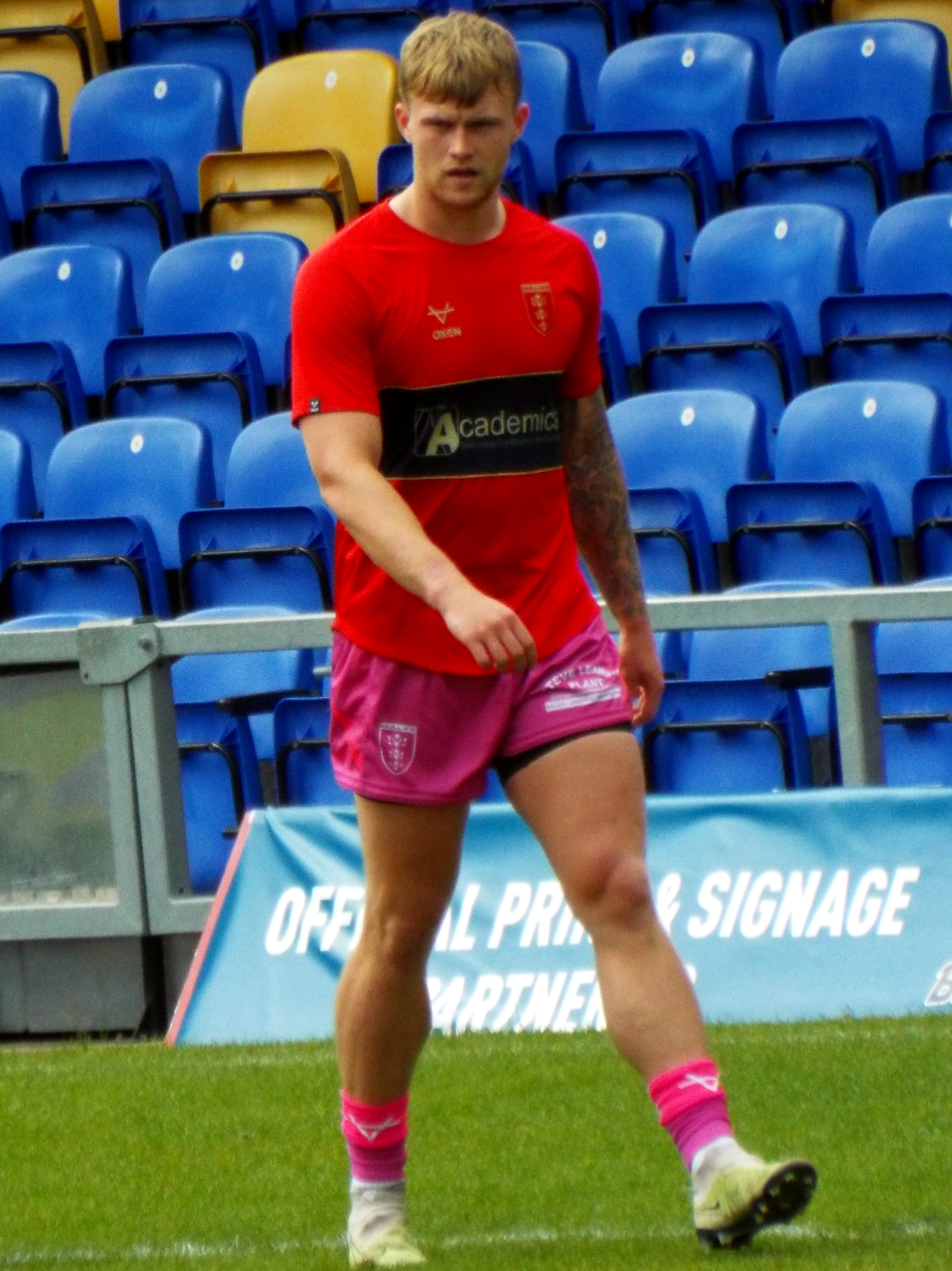

Personal information
- Full name: Connor Barley
- Born: 16 September 2004 (age 22) Hull, East Riding of Yorkshire, England
- Height: 6 ft 1 in (1.85 m)
- Weight: 14 st 11 lb (94 kg)

Playing information
- Position: Wing, Centre
Club
Years	Team	Pld	T	G	FG	P
2022–25	Hull Kingston Rovers	4	1	0	0	4
2023(loan)	→ York Knights	5	0	0	0	0
2024(DR)	→ Featherstone Rovers	8	2	0	0	8
2025(DR)	→ London Broncos	3	1	0	0	4
2025	Featherstone Rovers	3	2	0	0	8
2026	Goole Vikings	23	20	0	0	80
2027–	Hull FC	0	0	0	0	0
	Total	46	26	0	0	104
- Source: As of 17 September 2026

Connor Barley is a rugby league footballer who plays as a winger for the Hull FC in the Super League.

== Playing career ==
=== Hull KR ===
In 2022 he made his Super League début against St Helens.

=== York Knights (loan) ===
On 17 March 2023 he went on season long loan to York Knights

=== London Broncos (loan) ===
On 22 May 2025 it was reported that he had signed for London Broncos in the RFL Championship on short-term loan

=== Featherstone Rovers ===
On 4 September 2025 it was reported that he had signed for Featherstone Rovers in the RFL Championship until the end of the 2025 season

=== Goole Vikings ===
On 26 November 2025 it was reported that he had signed for Goole Vikings in the RFL Championship for the 2026 season

=== Hull FC ===
On 17 September 2026 it was reported that he had signed for Hull FC in the Super League on a one-year deal
