= Jack Hughes (rugby league, born 2000) =

English rugby league footballer (born 2000)

Personal information
- Full name: Jack Hughes
- Born: 15 November 2000 (age 25) London, England
- Height: 6 ft 3 in (1.91 m)
- Weight: 17 st 5 lb (110 kg)

Playing information

Rugby union
Club
Years	Team	Pld	T	G	FG	P
2019–2021	Northampton Saints	1	0	0	0	0
2021–2023	Bedford Blues	55	13	0	0	65
	Total	56	13	0	0	65

Rugby league
- Position: Prop
Club
Years	Team	Pld	T	G	FG	P
2023	London Skolars	3	1	0	0	4
2024	London Broncos	3	0	0	0	0
	Total	6	1	0	0	4
- Source: As of 24 November 2024

Jack Hughes (born 15 November 2000) is an English professional rugby league footballer who plays as a prop for the London Broncos in the Super League.

He previously played for the London Skolars in League 1, rugby sevens for the Northampton Saints and rugby union as a hooker for the Bedford Blues in the RFU Championship. He also represented England U18s at age grade level.

== Early life and education ==
He was born in London, England. He is the son of London Broncos former owner David Hughes. He was educated at Uppingham School.

== Playing career ==
=== Rugby Union ===
Hughes came through the Northampton Saints academy and featured numerous items for their Sevens team.

He spent time on loan from Northampton at the Bedford Blues in 2021. He later signed on permanent deal at the Goldington Road club.

=== Rugby League ===
Hughes joined the London Skolars on a short-term deal at the end of the 2022–23 RFU Championship season.

He joined the London Broncos first team squad at the start of the 2024 season.

He made his professional debut for the London Broncos in 2024 against the Warrington Wolves in the Challenge Cup.
