= Bill Leyland =

English rugby league footballer

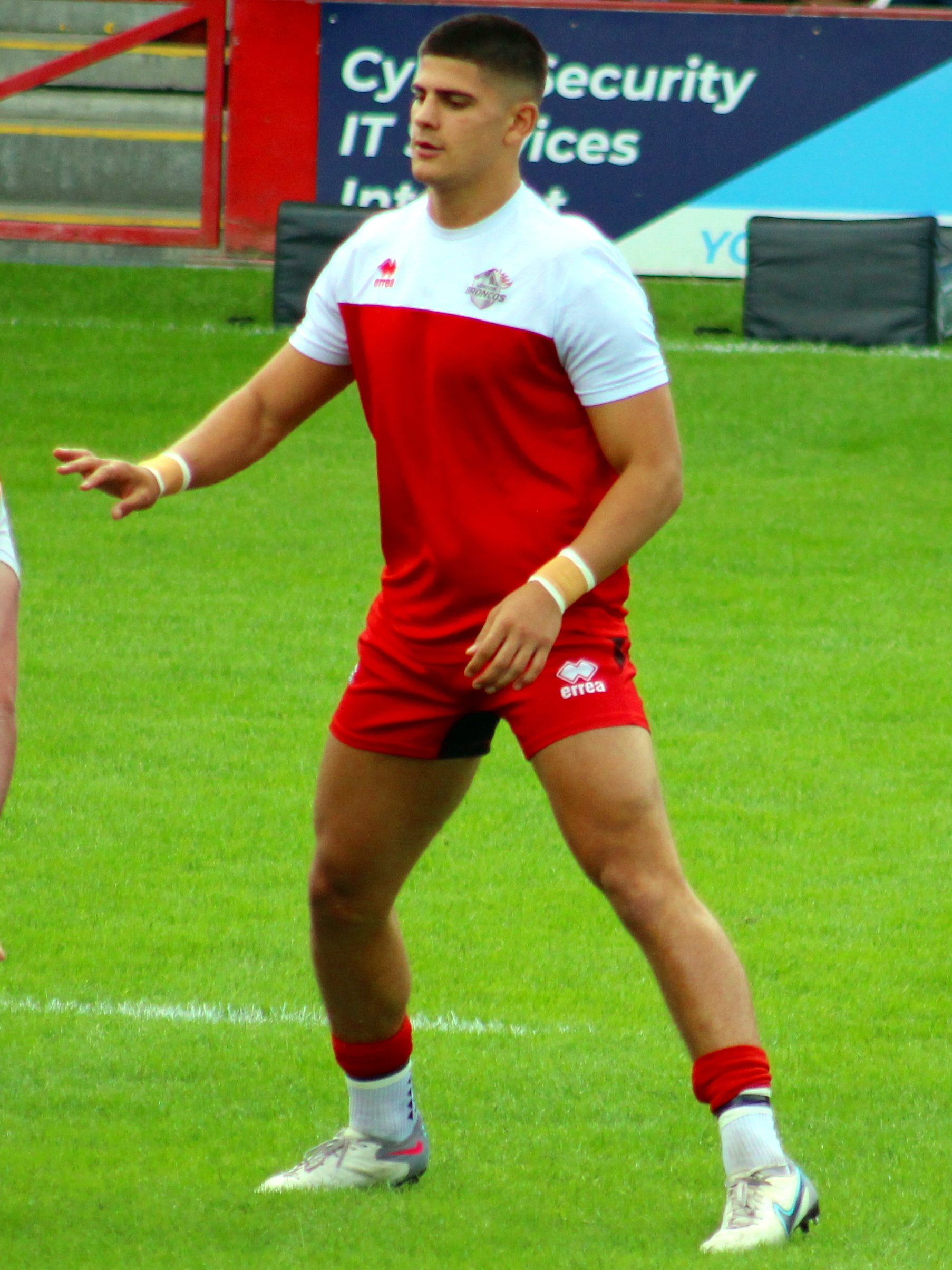

Personal information
- Full name: Billy Leyland
- Born: 3 February 2003 (age 23) Maidstone, Kent, England
- Height: 5 ft 11 in (1.80 m)
- Weight: 13 st 12 lb (88 kg)

Playing information
- Position: Hooker
Club
Years	Team	Pld	T	G	FG	P
2022–24	London Broncos	35	13	0	0	52
2025–	Hull Kingston Rovers	25	4	0	0	12
2025(loan)	→ Huddersfield Giants	1	0	0	0	0
2026(loan)	→ St Helens	2	3	0	0	12
	Total	63	20	0	0	76
- Source: As of 14 October 2026
- Education: Maidstone Grammar School
- Alma mater: St Mary's University, Twickenham
- Relatives: Oli Leyland (brother)

Bill Leyland (born 3 February 2003) is an English professional rugby league footballer who plays as a hooker for St Helens in the Super League, on a short-term loan from Hull Kingston Rovers.

== Background ==
Leyland was born in Maidstone, Kent, England. His brother Oli Leyland is a fellow London player.

He played for the Invicta Panthers as a junior.

Leyland attended Maidstone Grammar School and graduated from St Marys University in Twickenham, London.

== Playing career ==
=== London Broncos ===
He joined the London Broncos first team squad at the start of the 2022 season.

He made his professional debut for the London Broncos in 2022 against the York Knights.

Leyland was the Championship young player of the year in 2023.

On 15 October 2023, Leyland played in the Championship Grand Final victory against Toulouse Olympique in France.

=== Hull Kingston Rovers ===
On 15 July 2024 it was reported that he had signed for Hull Kingston Rovers in the Super League on a 2-year deal.

=== Huddersfield Giants (loan) ===
On 9 April 2025 it was reported that he had signed for the Huddersfield Giants in the Super League on loan.

=== St Helens (loan) ===
On 31 March 2026, Leyland signed for fellow Super League club St Helens on a short term loan alongside Jordan Dezaria. Leyland made his debut on 3 April as a substitute in the 'Rivals Round' derby against the Wigan Warriors at the BrewDog Stadium, scoring two late tries to secure a 34-24 comeback victory.

On 28 April 2026 it was reported that he had returned to St Helens in the Super League on a second one-week loan
