= Jarred Bassett =

Australian rugby league footballer

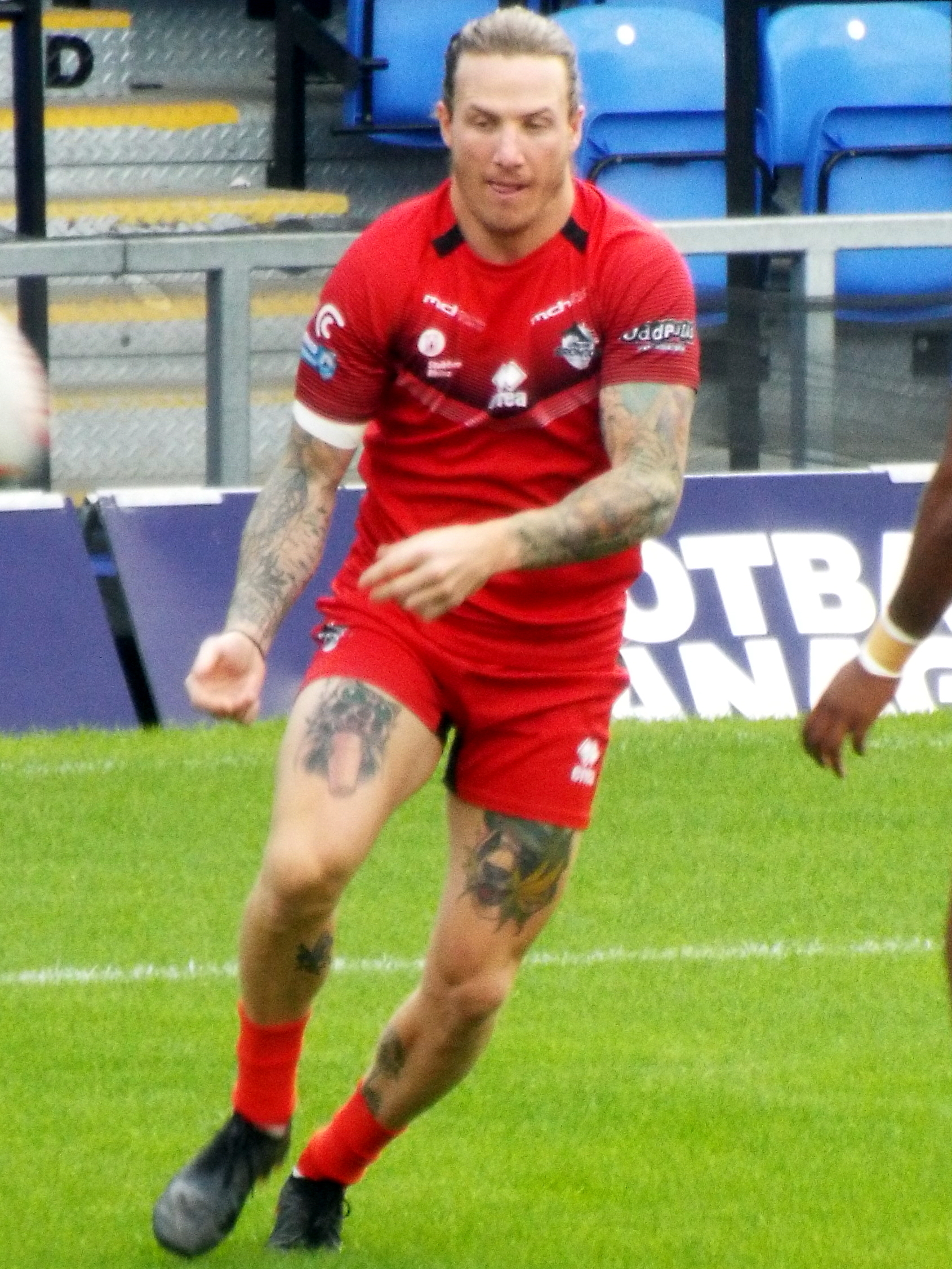

Personal information
- Full name: Jarred Bassett
- Born: 23 November 1991 (age 34) Gold Coast, Queensland, Australia

Playing information
- Height: 5 ft 11 in (1.80 m)
- Weight: 13 st 5 lb (85 kg)
- Position: Centre, Fullback, Wing
Club
Years	Team	Pld	T	G	FG	P
2022	London Skolars	16	19	0	0	76
2023–24	London Broncos	54	20	0	0	80
	Total	70	39	0	0	156

Jarred Bassett (born 23 November 1991) is an Australian professional rugby league footballer who last played as a centre, fullback and winger for the London Broncos in the Super League. He had previously played for the London Skolars in League 1.

As of his retirement in 2024, he is the only player in the British game to have played subsequently in tier 4, 3, 2, and 1 of the British rugby league system in four successive seasons.

== Background ==
Bassett was born in Gold Coast, Queensland, Australia.

== Playing career ==
=== Wests Warriors ===
Bassett began playing grassroots rugby league in 2015 Wests Warriors in the Southern Conference after moving to the UK. He was noted as a grassroots player to watch out for in 2020. Bassett was the South Conference League player of the year in 2021.

=== London Skolars ===
He joined the London Skolars first team squad at the start of the 2022 season. Bassett had a standout season at the London Skolars, achieving top try scorer, scoring 19 tries and winning the players' player award for the 2022 season. He was in the team of the month twice and was also named in the RFL League 1 Team of the Year in 2022.

=== London Broncos ===
Bassett joined the London Broncos first team squad at the start of the 2023 season. He made his professional debut for the Broncos in 2023 against the Batley Bulldogs.

On 15 October 2023, Bassett played in the Championship Grand Final victory against Toulouse Olympique in France, in which London gained promotion to the Super League.

Following London's 2024 Super League season campaign, Bassett retired from professional rugby in order to move back to Australia.
