= Ugo Tison =

France international rugby league footballer

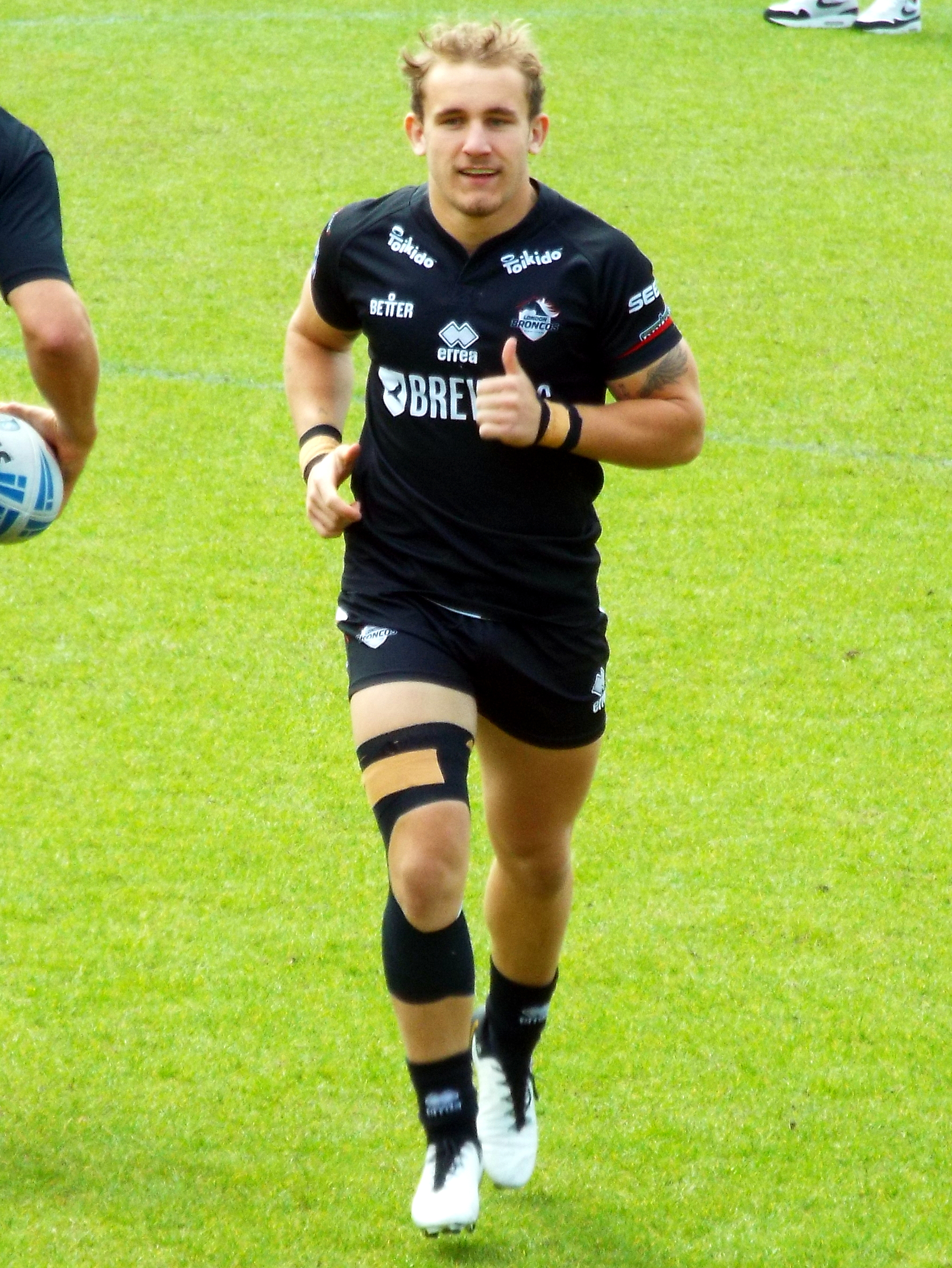

Personal information
- Full name: Ugo Tison
- Born: 7 July 2001 (age 25) Pyrénées-Orientales, Occitania, France
- Height: 5 ft 10 in (1.78 m)
- Weight: 13 st 1 lb (83 kg)

Playing information
- Position: Stand-off, Hooker
Club
Years	Team	Pld	T	G	FG	P
2018–24	Saint-Estève XIII Catalan	42	9	5	0	46
2022–24	Catalans Dragons	4	0	0	0	0
2023(DR)	→ Toulouse Olympique	2	0	0	0	0
2023(loan)	→ Wakefield Trinity	0	0	0	0	0
2024(loan)	→ London Broncos	4	0	0	0	0
2024	London Broncos	15	1	0	0	4
2025	Wynnum Manly Seagulls	2	0	0	0	0
2025–	Catalans Dragons	11	3	0	1	13
	Total	80	13	5	1	63
Representative
Years	Team	Pld	T	G	FG	P
2023–	France	3	0	0	0	0
- Source: As of 31 August 2025

Ugo Tison (born 7 July 2001) is a French professional rugby league footballer who plays as a stand-off or hooker for the Catalans Dragons in the Super League.

== Playing career ==
=== Catalans Dragons ===
In 2022, he made his Catalans debut in the Super League against the Wigan Warriors.

=== Wynnum Manly Seagulls ===
On 15 January 2025 it was reported that he had signed for Wynnum Manly Seagulls in the Queensland Cup for 2025.

=== Catalans Dragons (re-join) ===
On 3 August 2025 it was reported that he had re-joined Catalans Dragons in the Super League.

== International ==
He made his début on 29 April 2023 in the 64-0 defeat to England at the Halliwell Jones Stadium.
