= Robbie Storey =

English rugby league footballer

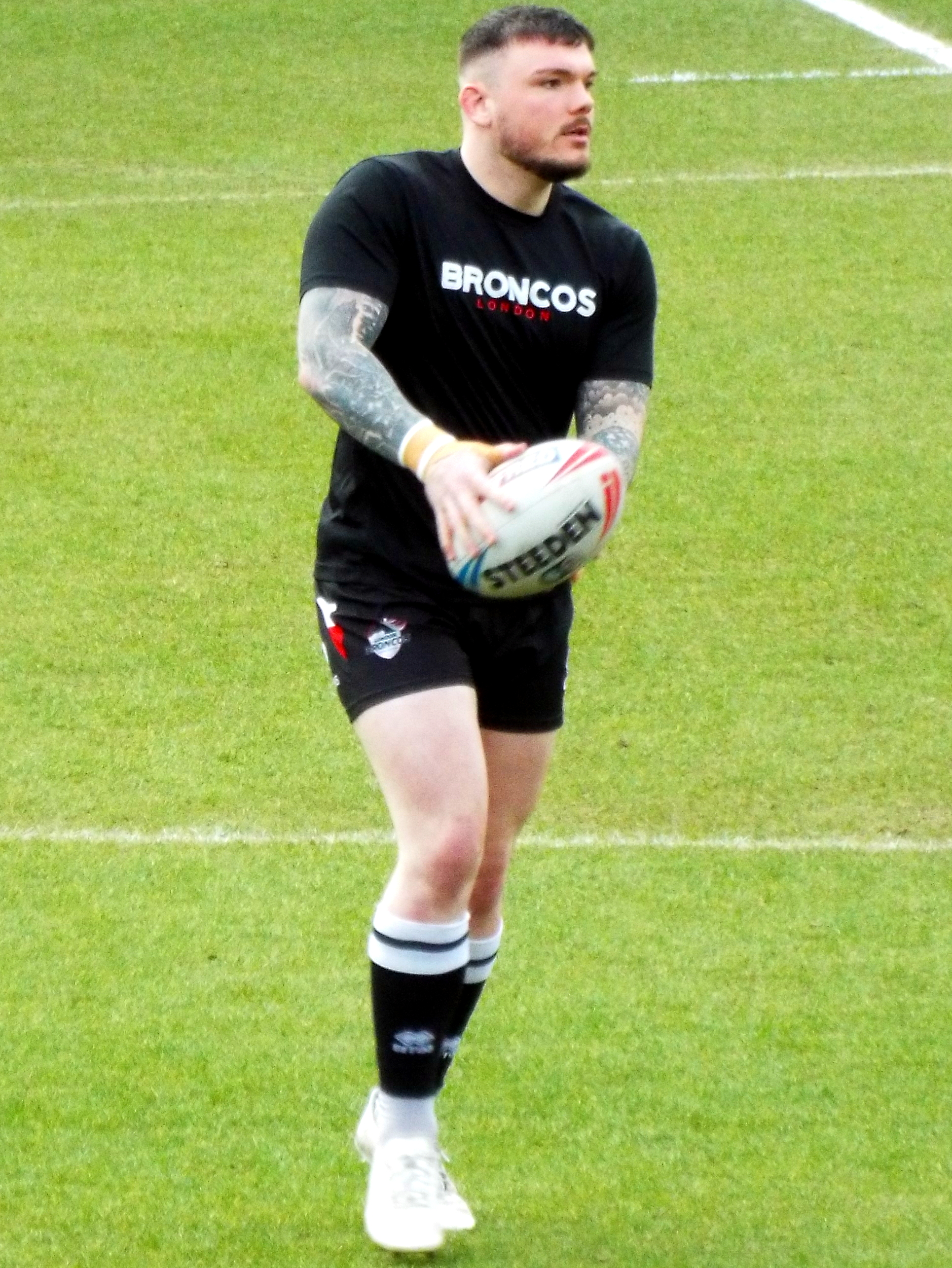

Personal information
- Full name: Robbie Storey
- Born: 21 October 1999 (age 26) Kingston upon Hull, East Riding of Yorkshire, England
- Height: 5 ft 10 in (1.78 m)
- Weight: 16 st 1 lb (102 kg)

Playing information

Rugby union
- Position: Wing
Club
| Years | Team | Pld | T | G | FG | P |
|---|---|---|---|---|---|---|
| 2019–20 | Hull Ionians |

Rugby league
- Position: Centre
Club
| Years | Team | Pld | T | G | FG | P |
|---|---|---|---|---|---|---|
| 2020–21 | AS Carcassonne | 17 | 5 | 0 | 0 | 20 |
| 2021 | Dewsbury Rams | 7 | 0 | 0 | 0 | 0 |
| 2022 | Doncaster RLFC | 18 | 11 | 0 | 0 | 44 |
| 2023 | Keighley Cougars | 27 | 11 | 0 | 0 | 44 |
| 2024 | London Broncos | 17 | 4 | 0 | 0 | 16 |
| 2025 | Townsville Blackhawks | 14 | 2 | 0 | 0 | 8 |
| | Total | 100 | 33 | 0 | 0 | 132 |
- Source: As of 6 January 2025

Robbie Storey (born 21 October 1999) is an English professional rugby league footballer who plays as a centre for the Townsville Blackhawks in the Queensland Cup, after playing for the London Broncos in the Super League the year before.

He has previously played for AS Carcassonne in the Elite One Championship, the Dewsbury Rams and Keighley Cougars in the Championship as well as previously playing for Doncaster in League 1.

== Background ==
Storey was born in Kingston upon Hull, East Riding of Yorkshire, England.

He was in the Castleford Tigers academy system. He played rugby union as a winger for Hull Ionians.

== Playing career ==
=== Carcassonne ===
Storey played for Carcassonne XIII in the Elite One Championship during the 2020–2021 season.

=== Dewsbury Rams ===
He joined the Dewsbury Rams ahead of the 2021 RFL Championship season.

=== Doncaster ===
Storey played for Doncaster in the 2022 RFL League 1 season.

=== Keighley Cougars ===
He played for the Keighley Cougars in the 2023 RFL Championship season.

=== London Broncos ===
Storey joined the London Broncos ahead of the 2024 Super League season.

=== Townsville Blackhawks ===
On 6 January 2025 it was reported that he had signed for Townsville Blackhawks in the Queensland Cup
