= Oliver Leyland =

English rugby league footballer

Oli Leyland
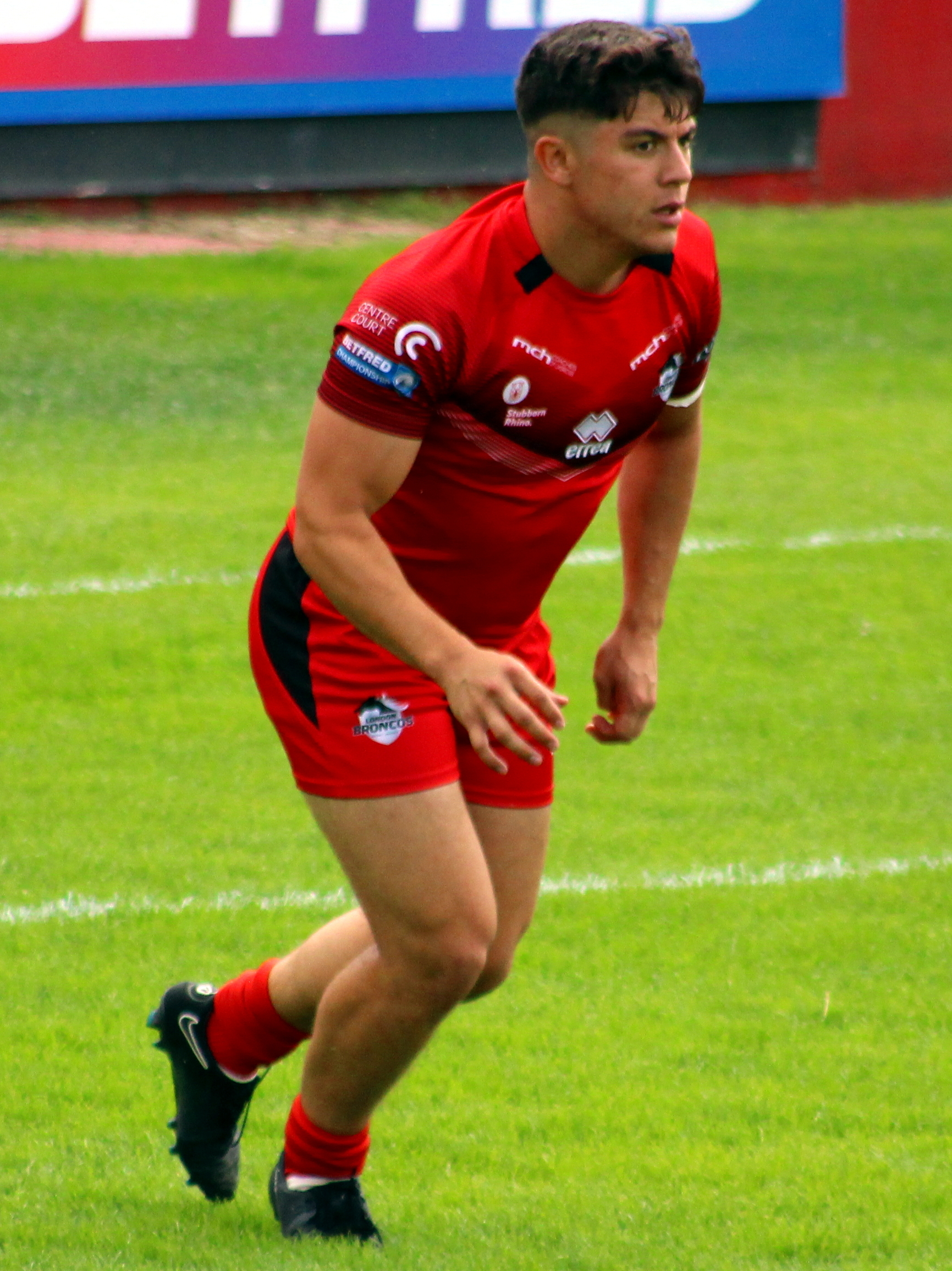

Personal information
- Full name: Oliver Leyland
- Born: 17 May 2001 (age 25) Maidstone, Kent, England
- Height: 5 ft 6 in (1.68 m)
- Weight: 12 st 13 lb (82 kg)

Playing information
- Position: Stand-off, Scrum-half, Fullback
Club
Years	Team	Pld	T	G	FG	P
2021–24	London Broncos	94	14	170	1	395
2021(loan)	→ London Skolars	4	0	0	0	0
2025–26	Warrington Wolves	5	2	0	0	8
2025(loan)	→ Widnes Vikings	1	0	0	0	0
2026–	Huddersfield Giants	0	0	0	0	0
	Total	104	16	170	1	403
- Source: As of 15 August 2026
- Education: Maidstone Grammar School
- Relatives: Bill Leyland (brother)

Oli Leyland (born 17 May 2001) is an English professional rugby league footballer who plays as a stand-off, scrum-half or fullback for the Huddersfield Giants in the Super League.

He has spent time at London Broncos in the Championship and the Super League, on loan from the Broncos at the London Skolars in League 1, Warrington Wolves in the Super League, and on loan at Widnes Vikings in the Championship.

== Background ==
Leyland was born in Maidstone, Kent, England. He attended Maidstone Grammar School.

He played for the Invicta Panthers as a junior. Leyland represented Lancashire against the Australian Schoolboys side. He joined the London Broncos Academy aged 16.

His brother Bill Leyland plays for Hull KR.

== Playing career ==
=== London Broncos ===
He joined the London Broncos first team squad at the start of the 2020 season.

He made his professional debut for the London Broncos in April 2021 against the York City Knights.

He spent time on loan from the Broncos at the Skolars in League 1.

Leyland was a runner up in the Championship young player of the year in 2022. He was the Broncos top point scorer in 2022, with 102 points from two tries and 47 goals, and won the LBSA Young Player of the Year award voted for by supporters. On 15 October 2023, Leyland played in the London Broncos upset Million Pound Game victory over Toulouse Olympique.

=== Warrington Wolves ===
On 8 October 2024, it was reported that he had signed for Warrington in the Super League on a two-year deal.

On 22 July 2026 it was reported that he had left Warrington Wolves with immediate effect

=== Huddersfield Giants ===
On 12 August 2026, it was reported that he had signed for Huddersfield in the Super League on a deal until the end of the 2026 season.
