= Rob Butler (rugby league) =

English professional rugby league footballer

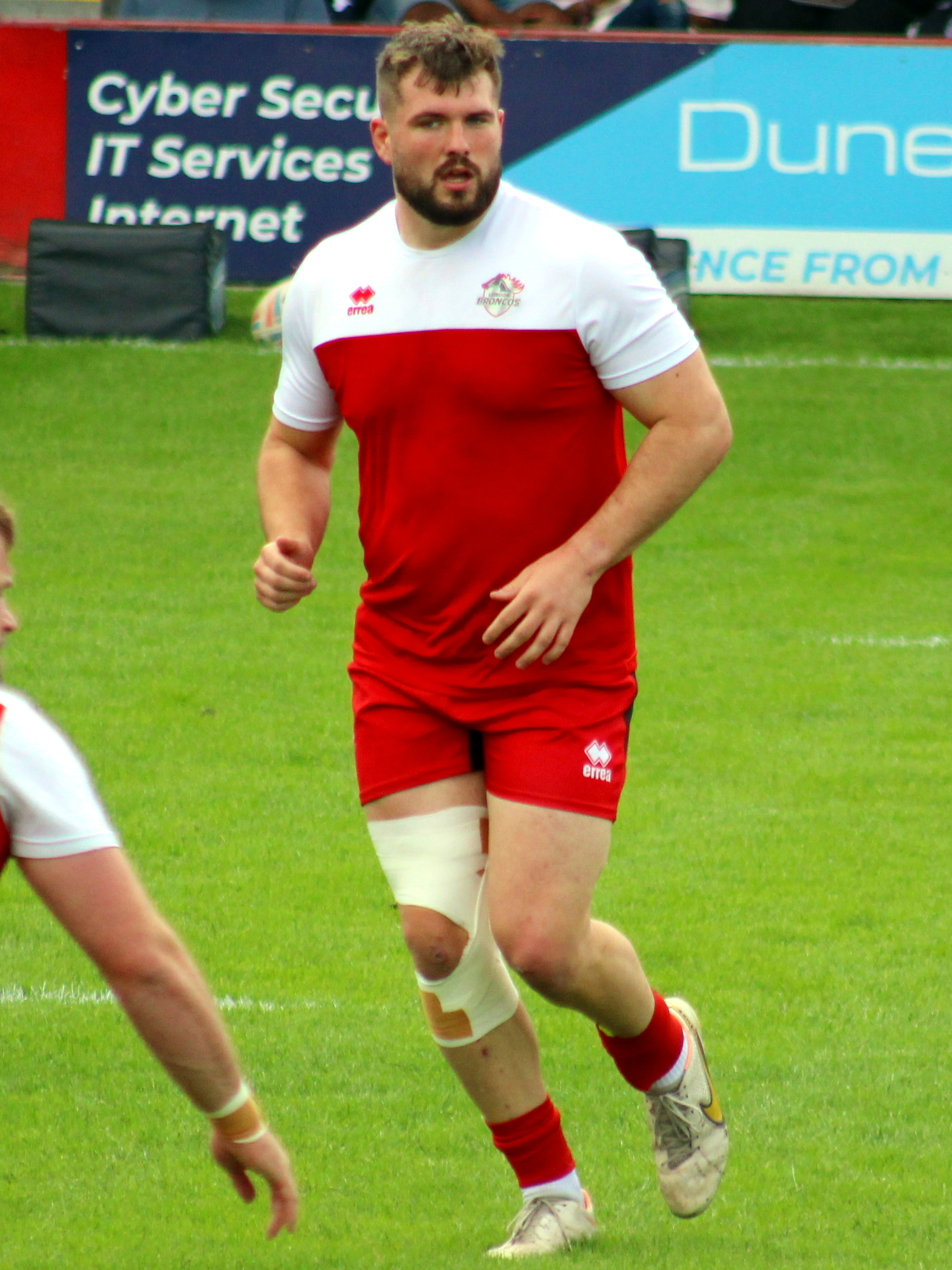

Personal information
- Full name: Robert Butler
- Born: 15 May 1998 (age 28) Rochester, Kent, England
- Height: 6 ft 3 in (1.91 m)
- Weight: 17 st 5 lb (110 kg)

Playing information
- Position: Prop
Club
Years	Team	Pld	T	G	FG	P
2017–20	London Broncos	40	3	0	0	12
2017(loan)	→ London Skolars	3	0	0	0	0
2018(loan)	→ London Skolars	14	2	0	0	8
2018(loan)	→ Coventry Bears	1	0	0	0	0
2019(loan)	→ Coventry Bears	1	1	0	0	4
2021–22	Warrington Wolves	6	0	0	0	0
2021(loan)	→ Leigh Centurions	6	0	0	0	0
2022–23	Wakefield Trinity	9	0	0	0	0
2023(loan)	→ Bradford Bulls	2	0	0	0	0
2023–24	London Broncos	24	0	0	0	0
2025–	Toulouse Olympique	24	2	0	0	8
	Total	130	8	0	0	32
Representative
Years	Team	Pld	T	G	FG	P
2019–	England Knights	1	0	0	0	0
- Source: As of 6 November 2026

Rob Butler (born 15 May 1998) is an English professional rugby league footballer who plays as a prop forward for Toulouse Olympique in the Betfred Super League and the England Knights at international level.

He has previously played for the London Broncos in the Championship and Warrington Wolves the Super League, and has spent time on loan from the Broncos at the London Skolars and the Coventry Bears in League 1.

== Background ==
Butler was born in Rochester, Kent, England and was a player at Medway Dragons RLFC for nine years as a junior.

== Career ==
=== London Broncos ===
In 2018 Butler made his professional debut for the London Broncos against the Toronto Wolfpack in Round 4 of the Championship.

=== Warrington Wolves ===
On 24 November 2020 it was announced that Butler had signed for the Warrington Wolves on a two-year deal.

=== Leigh Centurions (loan) ===
On 8 July 2021 it was reported that he had signed for the Leigh Centurions in the Super League on loan. Butler would later sign a contract to re-join the London Broncos.

=== London Broncos ===
On 15 October 2023, Butler played in the London Broncos upset Million Pound Game victory over Toulouse Olympique.

=== Toulouse Olympique ===
On 2 Oct 2024 it was reported that he had signed for Toulouse Olympique in the RFL Championship

== International career ==
He was called up to the England Knights training squad in July 2019.

In 2019 he made his international debut for the England Knights against Jamaica at Headingley Rugby Stadium.
