= 2019 RFL League 1 =

2019 rugby league competition in the United Kingdom

2019 League 1
- League: League 1
- Duration: 20 matches
- Teams: 11

2019 Season
- Champions: Whitehaven

Promotion and relegation
- Promoted from League 1: Oldham

The 2019 RFL League 1 was a professional rugby league football competition played in England and Wales and is the third tier of the sport for Rugby Football League (RFL) affiliated clubs. The sponsors for the league are the bookmakers, Betfred and the league will continue to be known as the Betfred League 1.

The league was restructured following a meeting on the RFL clubs in 2018 and League 1 was reduced in size from 14 clubs in 2018 to 12 clubs for 2019. However, on 23 October 2018, Hemel Stags announced that the club was withdrawing from the league for 2019 reducing the number of teams to 11; the RFL indicated that no replacement team is to be sought. The season will consist of 22 rounds with each of the 11 teams playing 20 fixtures against each other home and away and two bye rounds. The team finishing top will win automatic promotion to the 2020 Championship and be named league champions for 2019. The teams finishing second to sixth will meet in a series of play-off games culminating in the League 1 Play-Off Final. The winner of this match will also be promoted to the Championship for 2020.

During the season Coventry Bears were forced to move home fixtures away from Butts Park Arena due to work being undertaken on the pitch by the ground owners, Coventry R.F.C. Two other clubs also played home games at other venues due to pitch works; Doncaster played three games at Featherstone Rovers LD Nutrition Stadium in July and Workington Town played three games, also in July, at their original ground Borough Park (now the home of soccer club Workington A.F.C.).

The division was won by Whitehaven who secured the title and the automatic promotion place to the Championship with a 72–0 win over Coventry Bears in the last round of the regular season. Whitehaven were joined in the Championship for 2020 by Oldham who won the play-offs beating Newcastle Thunder 18–14 in the play-off final.

== Teams ==
Locations of the 2019 RFL League 1 teams

Colours	Club	City	Stadium	Capacity*
	Coventry Bears	Coventry, West Midlands	Butts Park Arena; Ivor Preece Field; Webb Ellis Ground	4,000; 1,500; 1,000
	Doncaster	Doncaster, South Yorkshire	Keepmoat Stadium	15,231
	Hunslet	Leeds, West Yorkshire	South Leeds Stadium	4,000
	Keighley Cougars	Keighley, West Yorkshire	Cougar Park	7,800
	London Skolars	Haringey, London	New River Stadium	2,000
	Newcastle Thunder	Newcastle, Tyne and Wear	Kingston Park	10,200
	North Wales Crusaders	Wrexham, Wales	Queensway Stadium	2,000
	Oldham	Oldham, Greater Manchester	Whitebank Stadium	1,500
	West Wales Raiders	Llanelli, Wales	Stebonheath Park	3,700
	Whitehaven	Whitehaven, Cumbria	Recreation Ground	7,500
	Workington Town	Workington, Cumbria	Zebra Claims Stadium	10,000

*capacity for rugby league games may differ from official stadium capacity.

== Standings ==
Pos	Team	Pld	W	D	L	PF	PA	PD	Pts	Qualification
1	Whitehaven	20	15	2	3	582	283	+299	32	Champions
2	Oldham	20	15	0	5	655	341	+314	30	Play-off semi-final
3	Newcastle Thunder	20	14	1	5	741	364	+377	29	Play-off qualifying final
4	Doncaster	20	12	0	8	564	309	+255	24	Play-off qualifying final
5	Hunslet	20	12	0	8	596	379	+217	24	Play-off elimination final
6	Workington Town	20	10	1	9	592	478	+114	21	Play-off elimination final
7	North Wales Crusaders	20	9	0	11	489	501	−12	18	
8	London Skolars	20	7	1	12	440	542	−102	15	
9	Coventry Bears	20	4	0	16	365	829	−464	8	
10	Keighley Cougars	20	8	1	11	447	576	−129	5 (Note: Keighley deducted 12 points for transfer of RFL membership during the close season.)	
11	West Wales Raiders	20	1	0	19	222	1091	−869	2	

== Play-offs ==
The winners of the play-off final will join this season's champions of League 1, Whitehaven, in the Championship in 2020.

Qualifying play-off
3	Newcastle Thunder	6
4	Doncaster	20
5	Hunslet	24
6	Workington Town	32

Qualifying semi-final
2	Oldham	22
Doncaster	12
Elimination semi-final
Newcastle Thunder	38
Workington Town	18

Preliminary final
Newcastle Thunder	34
Doncaster	4

Promotion play-off final
Oldham	18
Newcastle Thunder	14
