= 2018 London Broncos season =

- 2018 Championship Rank: 2nd
- Play-off result: Promoted to Super League via Million Pound Game
- Challenge Cup: Fifth Round
- 2018 record: Wins: 22; draws: 1; losses: 10
- Points scored: For: 1,094; against: 649

Team information
- Chairman: David Hughes
- Head Coach: Danny Ward
- Captain: Jay Pitts
- Stadium: Trailfinders Sports Ground
- Avg. attendance: 962
- High attendance: 1,904 vs. Leeds Rhinos 19/08/2018

Top scorers
- Tries: Kieran Dixon - 26
- Goals: Jarrod Sammut - 114
- Points: Jarrod Sammut - 316
Home colours	Away colours
← 2017	List of seasons	2019 →

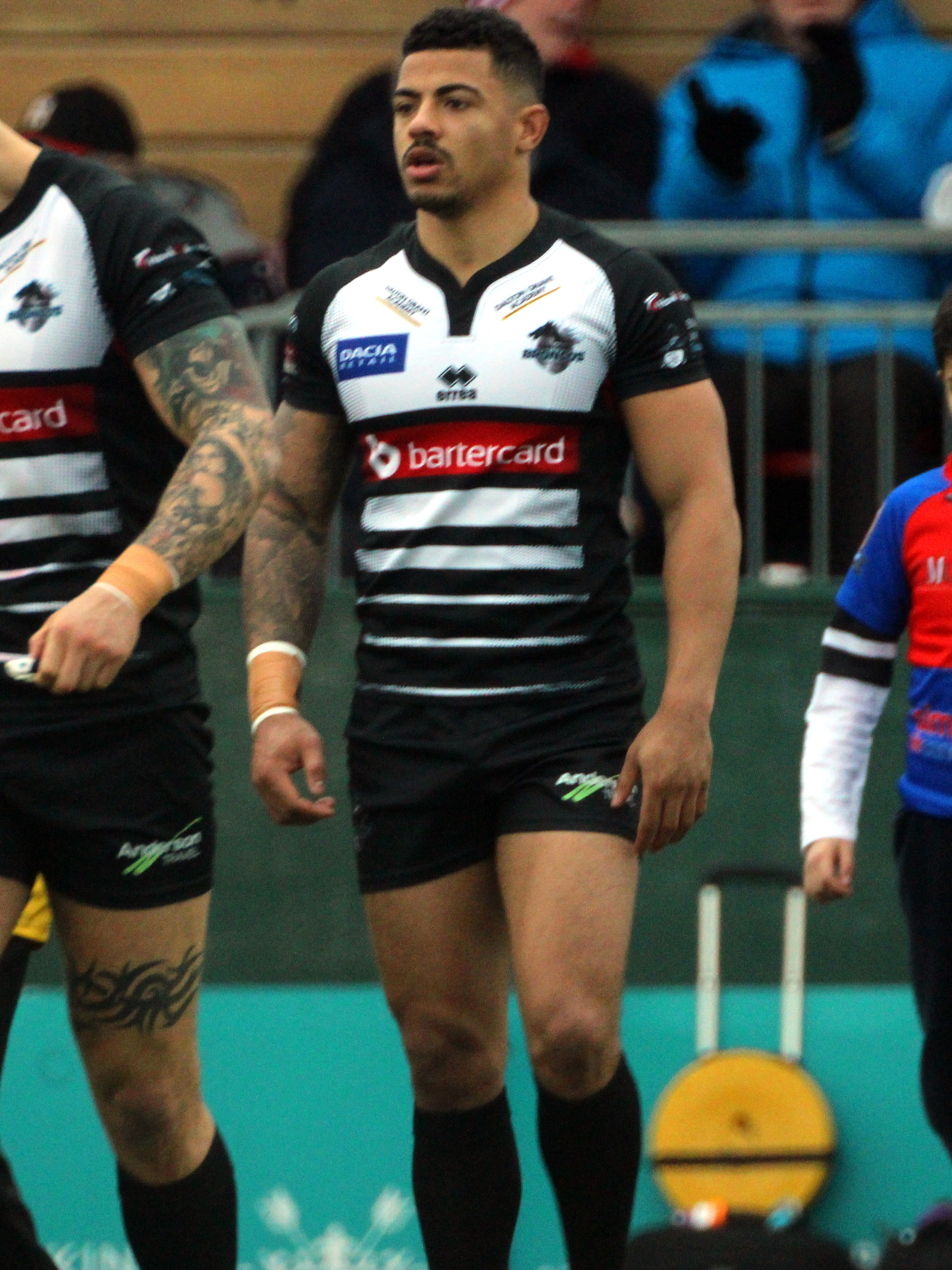
Kieran Dixon, leading try scorer as the Broncos returned to the top flight

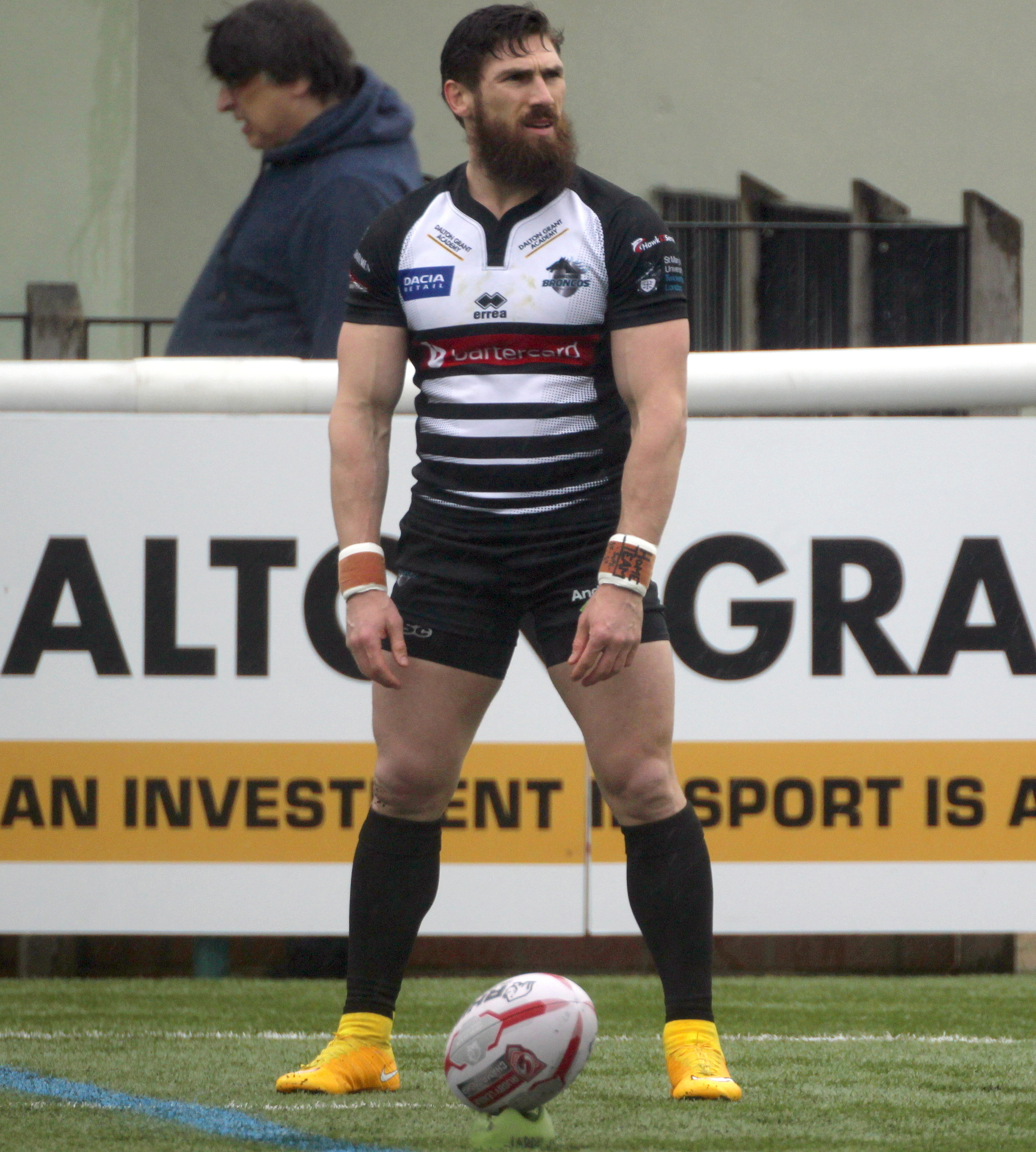
Jarrod Sammut, leading points scorer, and his two goals secured MPG victory

The 2018 London Broncos season was the 39th in the club's history, their fourth consecutive campaign out of the Super League and the third since moving to Ealing and the Trailfinders Sports Ground.

Competing in the 2018 Betfred Championship and the 2018 Ladbrokes Challenge Cup, the club was coached by Danny Ward, ending the regular league season in second place behind the Toronto Wolfpack, thereby qualifying for the 2018 Super League Qualifiers.

The London Broncos finished in fifth position at the end of the seven match qualifying series, earning themselves a place in the Million Pound Game and a trip to Canada to play Toronto Wolfpack, and the on-field season concluded with a sensational victory and promotion back to the European Super League, Rugby League's top flight in the Northern Hemisphere, for the 2019 season.

== Year review ==
=== January ===
Pre-season preparations concluded with two away fixtures, a victory at Betfred Championship 1 side, Doncaster 22–16 in snowy conditions, followed by a narrow 18–24 loss at Super League outfit, Hull Kingston Rovers.

=== February ===
The Broncos began the sponsored Betfred Championship season by winning their opening four fixtures, three of them at home.

Barrow Raiders were beaten 56–12 on the season's opening day following a man of the match display by James Meadows on debut, and following a 12–0 away success at Dewsbury Rams, Eddie Battye and Jarrod Sammut the try scorers, two further home victories over traditional rivals, Featherstone Rovers and the much fancied Toronto Wolfpack saw the London-based outfit top the early season table.

=== March ===
The month began in freezing conditions, courtesy of the Beast from the East, which results in the Broncos' Round 5 fixture at Sheffield Eagles being postponed on 4 March.

The Broncos recorded a fifth straight championship victory the following weekend however, defeating Batley Bulldogs 68–12 in a twelve try blitz at Trailfinders Sports Ground in front of a crowd of 1,200. Kieran Dixon scored four tries, and there were braces for Api Pewhairangi and Rhys Williams.

The Broncos commenced their Ladbrokes Challenge Cup campaign seven days later with a long trip to Betfred Championship 1 club, Workington Town, and a close encounter saw the Londoners emerge victorious 22–20, Rhys Williams repeated the feat of seven days previous with a try double, and Api Pewhairangi and Tom Spencer also crossed the chalk line for Danny Ward's side.

The midweek Ladbrokes Challenge Cup draw pitted the Broncos with a trip to Leigh Centurions.

The last Sunday of the month had the Broncos travelling north to Heywood Road, home of struggling Swinton Lions and the visitors recorded a 64–18 win to reassert their authority at the top of the championship table. The twelve try rout saw a hat-trick for Alex Walker and doubles for Kieran Dixon and James Cunningham. James Meadows, Will Lovell and Lewis Bienek also grab four-pointers to further emphasise the growing influence of the London produced players while Tom Spencer and Ben Hellewell completed the scoring.

Good Friday saw the visit of Sylvain Houles' Toulouse Olympique, and despite an early score by captain, Jay Pitts, the hosts struggled in the wet conditions and subsided to a first league defeat of the campaign, the French side running out easy 36-16 victors.

=== April ===
In a precursor to the upcoming 5th round Ladbrokes Challenge Cup tie later in the month the Broncos complete their Easter programme at Leigh Centurions. A hard-fought encounter on Bank Holiday Monday in front of 3, 328 sees Danny Ward's men just came up short, tries from Elliot Kear, James Cunningham and Matty Gee not enough to prevent a second defeat inside four days as the improving hosts recorded a fourth straight championship victory.

Another tough day at the office ensued six days later, as a trip to Halifax R.L.F.C. resulted in a third defeat in as many games, the Broncos unable to take advantage of the hosts twice being reduced to 12 men in a feisty encounter, eventually losing 16–26 to Richard Marshall's Shaymen.

The Broncos travelled to Rochdale Hornets on the following Friday and returned south with two valuable points. Kieran Dixon led the way with a treble added to by a Sadiq Adebiyi brace, scores sufficient to see the Broncos victorious 30–15 on an extremely wet evening at the Crown Oil Arena.

A return to Lancashire and the Leigh Centurions the following weekend proved less fruitful, a below par performance ends with the Londoners crashing out of the Ladbrokes Challenge Cup 0-40.

The month is completed with a comfortable eleven try home win over lowly Dewsbury Rams, the mercurial Jarrod Sammut contributing 29 points, three tries and ten goals in a 64-6 success.

=== May ===
The early May Bank holiday weekend had the Broncos play host to familiar foes, in the shape of Leigh Centurions, and despite sweltering conditions the home side fell to a third defeat by Kieron Purtill's Leigh Centurions team inside five weeks. In front of a season's biggest crowd to date of 1,340, tries from Rhys Williams, Alex Walker, Matty Gee, James Meadows and Sadiq Adebiyi were not quite enough to prevent a 30-40 reverse and a slide to fourth place in the Betfred Championship table.

The next two weekend's saw the Broncos rack up 112 points in two victories over Sheffield Eagles, the first, the postponed Round 5 fixture. The month ends with a first defeat at the Summer Bash as Toulouse Olympique again proved too strong for the Broncos who lost 28–40 in sunny Blackpool, despite tries from Jarrod Sammut, captain Jay Pitts, Ben Evans and two from Rhys Williams.

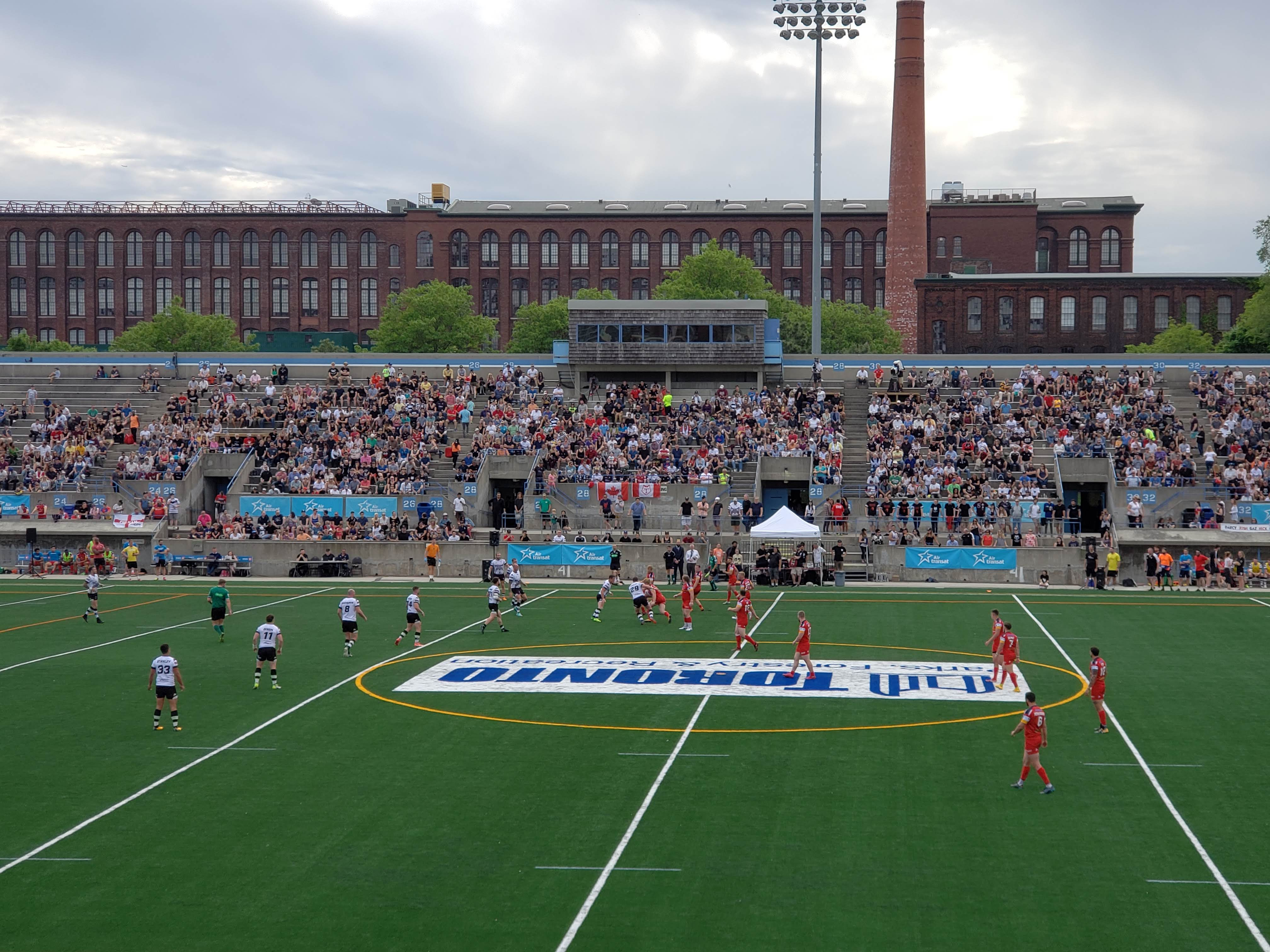
London playing against the Toronto Wolfpack at Lamport Stadium in Canada

=== June ===
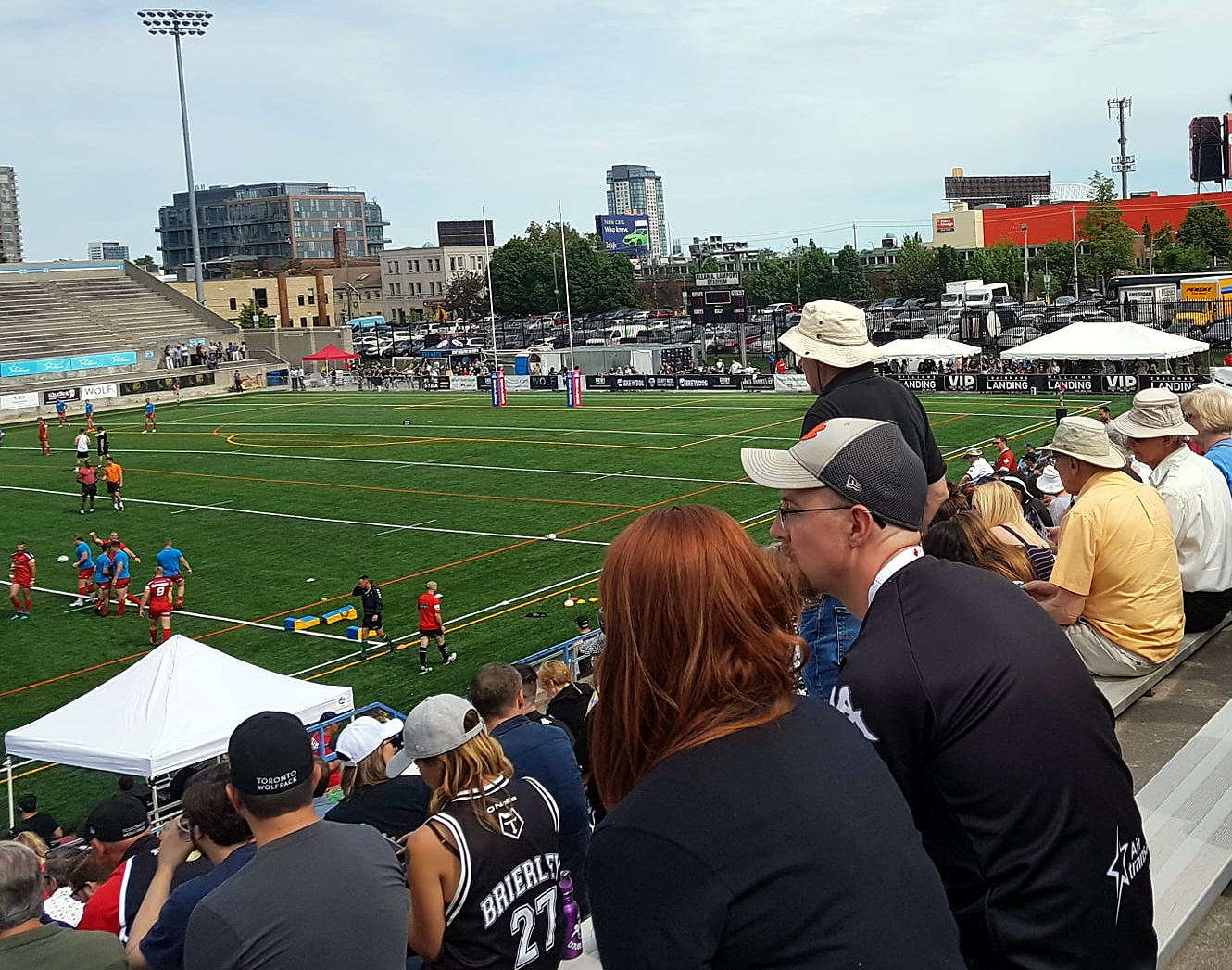
London warming up at Lamport Stadium in Canada

With a week off due to the Ladbrokes Challenge Cup quarter-finals the Broncos had time to re-group, ahead of their first ever trans-atlantic fixture at Betfred Championship leaders, Toronto Wolfpack. The hosts, backed by a crowd of 7,384 were intent on avenging their only league defeat of the season back in February, and proved difficult opponents, tries from Jarrod Sammut and Elliot Kear were unable to prevent a 12–32 loss, a result that sees the Broncos drop out of the top four.

Rochdale Hornets and Swinton Lions visited Trailfinders Sports Ground before month end, and Danny Ward's team regain their form with two impressive victories, a regular season's best 68–0 against the former, and an equally convincing 58–22 over the latter.

=== July ===
The Londoners, with a tough looking run-in, remained firmly in contention in fifth place and continued their charge with a 38–16 win at Batley Bulldogs, a brace from Rhys Williams, and further efforts from Api Pewhairangi, Matty Gee, Jay Pitts and Kieran Dixon were enough to secure the points against Matt Diskin's side.

A third match up of the campaign against Toulouse Olympique saw the teams share forty points. In temperatures reaching 33c the Broncos fight back from 12 to 20 down to grab a point in the game's last quarter, an Eddie Battye try is converted by Kieran Dixon, who then kicked a 75th minute pressured penalty to secure a potentially vital point in France.

The Broncos hosted Halifax R.L.F.C. the following weekend, and the home side gained a narrow and important 20–18 win, courtesy of tries by the prolific Rhys Williams who crossed the whitewash twice, Alex Walker and Ben Evans. The result returned the Broncos to the top four ahead of a pivotal fixture away to third placed Featherstone Rovers seven days later, and despite trailing 0–7 at the break, the Broncos came back in the second stanza, tries from Kieran Dixon, Jarrod Sammut and Alex Walker enough to earn a 14-7 come from behind victory.

The season win left the fate of the Broncos in their own hands going into their final game of the regular campaign, a trip to Craven Park, Barrow-in-Furness, home of Barrow Raiders. A thirteen try 72–6 rout of the Cumbrians secured a place in the Super League Qualifiers, and second spot in the Betfred Championship for the third successive season behind winners, Toronto Wolfpack.

=== August ===
The Broncos kicked-off the Super League Qualifiers with a fixture at Widnes Vikings in front of the Thursday evening Sky Sports cameras. Trailing 0–6 at the break Danny Ward's men produced a stunning second half performance to earn a dramatic 21-20 come from behind victory. Mark Ioane crossed early in the second half to reduce the arrears, and despite falling 4-14 behind, 3 tries in nine minutes from Daniel Harrison and a Kieran Dixon double, the second a 70-metre interception, put the Londoners 20-14 ahead. The hosts leveled, only for Jarrod Sammut to win it for the London Broncos with a long range field goal in the dying seconds.

The Broncos entertained current Super League champions, Leeds Rhinos in Round 2, and a season's best home crowd of 1,904 witnessed an entertaining encounter with the Broncos registering 22 unanswered second half points, although these were not enough to prevent a 32–48 defeat. A brave effort sees Rhys Williams bag another brace while there is a first professional try for Daniel Hindmarsh. Kieran Dixon and Ben Hellewell also crossed the chalk-line in their 100th appearances for the club.

=== September ===
The London Broncos began the month and continuation of their Super League Qualifiers campaign seven days after Catalans Dragons historic 2018 Challenge Cup Wembley success with a second trip of the season to Canada, and a fixture with Toronto Wolfpack. A four try blitz inside eight second half minutes was unable to prevent Danny Ward's men from falling to a 22-34 reversal in front of a partisan crowd of 7,557 the prolific Rhys Williams and Kieran Dixon add to their season's try tally and there were also four pointers for Alex Walker and Ben Evans.

The London Broncos played host to fellow Championship side, Toulouse Olympique eight days later in a crucial fourth out of seven Super League Qualifiers fixture, and a season's best display results in Danny Ward's men run out convincing 34-8 victors, a success that saw the Londoners leapfrog their French counterparts in the table and into a Million Pound Game position. Alex Walker bagged a try double, to reach 20 for the season, whilst there were further tries from James Cunningham, Kieran Dixon and Ben Hellewell.

Game 5 of the qualifiers campaign saw the London Broncos travel to familiar foes, Hull Kingston Rovers, and despite a display on Yorkshire's east coast, the Southerners came up short, on the wrong end of an 18–30 score line. The irrepressible Jarrod Sammut reached 20 tries for the season to draw the Londoners level early on, and although Matty Gee and Michael Channing added second half four pointers, these were not enough to secure the spoils for the Broncos who dropped out of the Million Pound Game positions as a consequence. The Broncos returned home to host Salford Red Devils seven days later, the match moved forward 24 hours at the behest of the Rugby Football League (RFL) to accommodate broadcast partner, Sky Sports' scheduling of the final round of fixtures the following week. In one of the most memorable games seen in the Capital in recent times, the Londoners emerged victorious 11-8 after a titanic battle against their Super League opponents. The heavens had opened mid morning and continued long into the night, but the inclement weather failed to deter captain, Jay Pitts who scored the home side's only try of the afternoon with a close-range effort after 14 minutes. Thereafter, a combination of defense and the kicking boot of Jarrod Sammut, was enough to see Danny Ward’s team secure two crucial points and leave their promotion aspirations very much alive with one game of the Super League Qualifiers, at home to Halifax, remaining.

Much conjecture during the week's build up to the final match had centered on whether the Londoners could qualify, and then secure a home fixture in the Million Pound Game. Results in the 48 hours preceding the contest would have a major bearing on the outcome and close challengers, Toulouse Olympique's loss at Salford Red Devils on the Thursday evening greatly improved the chances of Danny Ward’s men making the end of season finale, although Toronto Wolfpack’s stunning 17-16 success over fallen champions, Leeds Rhinos at Headingley a day later, meant the Londoners were almost certain to have to travel. The Broncos had to avoid an unlikely 24 point defeat at Trailfinders Sports Ground on the Saturday evening to ensure qualification, a feat they achieved as a Jarrod Sammut inspired display was enough to see the southern based outfit earn a come from behind victory. The triumph was not without a hiccup though as Richard Marshall’s valiant West Yorkshiremen raced into an early twelve point lead before tries from Jarrod Sammut and Éloi Pélissier prior to the interval, the latter with his first for the club, and second half efforts from Kieran Dixon and Elliot Kear secured a 23–18 win, fifth position in the final table and an away berth in the Million Pound Game. Destination of travel was confirmed 24 hours later, as Hull Kingston Rovers’s 30–0 triumph over already relegated Widnes Vikings ensured their Super League status, leaving the London Broncos searching for their passports ahead of a trip back to the land of the Maple Leaf for the third time in 2018 to play Paul Rowley's Toronto Wolfpack on Canada Thanksgiving Sunday.

=== October ===
The London Broncos returned to the Betfred sponsored Super League after an absence of four years, with a 4–2 victory against the Toronto Wolfpack in the Million Pound Game. In a tryless game, the Broncos emerged victorious thanks the boot of Jarrod Sammut, who kicked a goal in each half of the game. Although the hosts' Gareth O’Brien, hero for the Salford Red Devils in the same fixture in 2016, had managed to cancel out the Australian born Maltese International's first half effort, his attempt to level for a second time from distance in the 69th minute of an absorbing contest missed narrowly, and thereafter the Londoners held out. Home-grown fullback Alex Walker, who dislocated three fingers, breaking one of them in the first minute, was named man of the match for an outstanding performance, capped by a stunning last-ditch tackle to deny Toronto Wolfpack's Blake Wallace late on as the Broncos held firm to secure the win.

The end of the month saw a raft of players join the club as the London Broncos began their preparations for a return to the Super League. Matty Fozard, Nathan Mason and Greg Richards joined Éloi Pélissier in signing for Danny Ward’s men, the latter having played an influential part in the Londoners play-off promotion success, whilst James Cunningham and Elliot Kear agreed contracts to remain with the London-based outfit.

=== November ===
The month began with the signing of Jordan Abdull from fellow Super League club, Hull FC, and Gideon Boafo signing his first full time professional contract with club after excelling with the London Broncos Academy.

The eagerly awaited 2019 Super League fixtures were released on the first Tuesday of the month, with the London Broncos scheduled to host Wakefield Trinity on the opening weekend of the new season.

In further off season transfer activity the London Broncos captured the signature of St. Helens centre; Ryan Morgan on a season long loan, while the month ended with goodbye's to Jarrod Sammut, Tom Spencer and Ben Evans.

London Broncos confirmed their first pre-season fixture of 2019, and traveled to League 1 outfit, Doncaster R.L.F.C. on 20 January.

=== December ===
A quiet end to the year saw the London Broncos capture the signature of Luke Yates from NRL club, Newcastle Knights.

== Milestones ==
=== February ===
- Danny Ward took charge of his first professional game with a 56–12 victory over the Barrow Raiders.
- James Meadows made his professional debut in the round 1 victory over the Barrow Raiders.
- Sam Davis made his professional debut in the round 1 victory over the Barrow Raiders.
- Daniel Harrison played in his 100th professional game with the round 1 victory over the Barrow Raiders.
- Jordan Johnstone joined on loan, and made his Broncos debut in the victory over the Dewsbury Rams in Round 2 of the Championship.
- Matty Fleming made his first start for London in the round 3 victory over Featherstone Rovers.
- Rob Butler made his professional debut in the round 4 victory over the Toronto Wolfpack.

=== March ===
- The round 5 fixture against the Sheffield Eagles was cancelled due to weather.
- Jordan Johnstone returned to parent club Widnes after the completion of his loan spell.
- James Cunningham called up to the England Knights Performance Squad.
- Sam Davis scored his first try in the professional game during the round 6 victory over Batley Bulldogs.
- Kam Pearce-Paul joins the Coventry Bears on a months loan deal.
- Jamaican international Jacob Ogden made his first appearance in the professional game, debuting for London in Round 4 of the Challenge Cup.
- Dan Hindmarsh made his professional debut for the London Broncos in Round 4 of the Challenge Cup.
- Lewis Bienek signed a three-and-a-half-year contract with Hull F.C. He was immediately loaned back to the Broncos for the remainder of the season.
- Rhys Williams played his 100th consecutive game for the London Broncos.
- James Meadows scored his first try in the professional game during the round 7 victory over Swinton Lions.
- Toulouse Olympique's win over the Broncos saw London lose their 100% start to the season and was the first defeat in Wards coaching career.
- Eddie Battye played his 50th game for London in the defeat against Toulouse Olympique.

=== April ===
- The Broncos were knocked out of the Challenge Cup in the fifth round by the Leigh Centurions.
- Matt Davies made his professional debut in the Round 12 victory over the Dewsbury Rams.

=== May ===
- Lewis Bienek ended his loan period back at the Broncos and returned to Hull F.C.

=== June ===
- The Broncos played their first ever trans-atlantic fixture in the defeat by the Toronto Wolfpack.
- The 68-0 drubbing of Rochdale Hornets was London's biggest win of the regular season, and largest ever points difference win in the Championship for the club.
- Matt Davis signs for Warrington Wolves on a two-year contract, starting in 2019.

=== July ===
- Daymeric Pelo joined from Limoux and signed a deal until the end of the 2018 season.
- Éloi Pélissier joined from the Lézignan Sangliers and signed a deal until the end of the 2018 season.
- The 72–6 victory over the Barrow Raiders represented the Broncos biggest ever away win in the Championship.
- London Broncos finished the regular Championship season as runners up, and earned a place in the Super League Qualifiers.
- The Broncos were the top points scorers in the Championship, scoring 907 points in their 23 regular season games, at an average of nearly 40 points per game.

=== August ===
- The Broncos 21–20 victory over Widnes in the opening game of the Super League Qualifiers was their first against Super League opposition since defeating Salford Red Devils 19–16 at the Salford City Stadium in the 2016 Super 8s
- Api Pewhairangi played his 50th game for the Broncos in the Super League Qualifiers victory over the Widnes Vikings
- Kieran Dixon made his 100th appearance for the Broncos in the Super League Qualifiers fixture against Leeds Rhinos
- Ben Hellewell also made his 100th appearance for the Broncos in the Super League Qualifiers fixture against Leeds Rhinos
- Daniel Hindmarsh scored his first professional try for the Broncos in the Super League Qualifiers fixture against Leeds Rhinos
- The London Broncos attracted their highest attendance of the season to date, 1, 904 for the Super League Qualifiers Round 2 fixture versus Leeds Rhinos
- Kieran Dixon who recently made his 100th appearance for the Broncos signed a new two-year contract with the Londoners
- Eddie Battye signed a new one-year contract with the Trailfinders Sports Ground based outfit

=== September ===
- Jarrod Sammut reached 100 goals for the season when converting his fourth of seven goals in the Super League Qualifiers fixture against Toulouse Olympique
- Alex Walker reached 20 tries for the campaign with a brace in the Super League Qualifiers fixture against Toulouse Olympique
- Elliot Kear made his 100th appearance for the London Broncos in the Super League Qualifiers fixture against Hull Kingston Rovers
- Jarrod Sammut reached 20 tries for the season with the opener in the Super League Qualifiers match versus Hull Kingston Rovers
- Danny Ward in his first year as coach of London Broncos was voted the Championship Coach of the Year
- London Broncos were this year's winners of the Project of the Year Award for Championship and League 1 for their alliance with Featherstone School Sports Partnership delivering programmes within primary schools in Ealing to improve numeracy and literacy and emotional and physical wellbeing. The Project of the Year award recognises a club across both leagues who has shown an outstanding commitment to meeting the objectives of raising the visibility and profile of the competition and increasing attendance at one or more games through a special project.
- London Broncos ended their Super League Qualifiers campaign in fifth position with a home victory over Halifax, which earned them a place in the Million Pound Game

=== October ===
- Michael Channing announced his early retirement from the game through a neck injury
- Will Lovell made his 50th appearance for London Broncos in the Million Pound Game against Toronto Wolfpack
- London Broncos returned to the Betfred sponsored Super League on Sunday 7 October 2018 after an absence of four years with victory in the Million Pound Game versus Toronto Wolfpack at the Lamport Stadium
- Six London produced players featured in the Million Pound Game victory over the Toronto Wolfpack; Alex Walker, Kieran Dixon, Will Lovell, Daniel Hindmarsh, Rob Butler, and Matty Davies
- Matty Fozard signed for the London Broncos on a two-year contract from Championship club, Sheffield Eagles.
- James Cunningham penned a one-year deal with the London Broncos keeping him at the club until the end of the 2019 season.
- Elliot Kear agreed a new one-year contract to keep him at the London Broncos for the 2019 Super League campaign.
- Éloi Pélissier signed a one-year deal with the London Broncos, keeping him at the club for the 2019 season.
- Nathan Mason joined the London Broncos on a two-year contract from fellow Super League club, Huddersfield Giants
- Greg Richards signed for the London Broncos on a two-year contract following his release from Championship club, Leigh Centurions earlier this year

=== November ===
- Matt Davies signed a one-year full time contract after featuring eight times for the London Broncos during the 2018 campaign whilst on an apprenticeship contract working with the London Rugby League Foundation and the Broncos Community programme.
- Jordan Abdull joined the London Broncos on a one-year deal from fellow Super League club, Hull FC.
- Gideon Boafo signed his first full time professional contract with club after excelling with the London Broncos Academy.
- Ryan Morgan joined the London Broncos on-loan from St. Helens for the 2019 Super League season.
- Ben Evans departs the Londoners and joins Championship outfit, Toulouse Olympique
- Tom Spencer ends his association with the London Broncos and signs for Championship club, Leigh Centurions
- Jarrod Sammut leaves the London Broncos for personal reasons and signs a two-year contract with Wigan Warriors

=== December ===
- London Broncos secure the signature of Luke Yates from NRL club, Newcastle Knights

== 2018 tables ==
=== Betfred Championship - Regular Season ===
Pos	Team	Pld	W	D	L	PF	PA	PD	Pts	Qualification
1	Toronto Wolfpack	23	20	1	2	866	374	+492	41	The Qualifiers
2	London Broncos	23	16	1	6	907	423	+484	33	The Qualifiers
3	Toulouse Olympique	23	16	1	6	900	438	+462	33	The Qualifiers
4	Halifax	23	16	1	6	643	416	+227	33	The Qualifiers
5	Featherstone Rovers	23	16	0	7	819	420	+399	32	Championship Shield
6	Leigh Centurions	23	16	0	7	849	508	+341	32	Championship Shield
7	Batley Bulldogs	23	8	0	15	523	703	−180	16	Championship Shield
8	Sheffield Eagles	23	7	0	16	437	843	−406	14	Championship Shield
9	Dewsbury Rams	23	6	1	16	424	746	−322	13	Championship Shield
10	Barrow Raiders	23	5	3	15	382	816	−434	13	Championship Shield
11	Swinton Lions	23	3	2	18	402	866	−464	8	Championship Shield
12	Rochdale Hornets	23	4	0	19	327	926	−599	8	Championship Shield

=== Super League Qualifiers - Super 8s ===
Pos	Team	Pld	W	D	L	PF	PA	PD	Pts	Qualification
1	Salford Red Devils	7	5	0	2	218	75	+143	10	Super League XXIV
2	Leeds Rhinos	7	5	0	2	216	137	+79	10	Super League XXIV
3	Hull KR	7	5	0	2	197	162	+35	10	Super League XXIV
4	Toronto Wolfpack	7	5	0	2	136	118	+18	10	Million Pound Game
5	London Broncos (P)	7	4	0	3	161	164	−3	8	Million Pound Game
6	Toulouse Olympique	7	3	0	4	156	190	−34	6	2019 Championship
7	Widnes Vikings (R)	7	1	0	6	92	173	−81	2	2019 Championship
8	Halifax	7	0	0	7	68	225	−157	0	2019 Championship

(P) Promoted; (R) Relegated

== Fixtures and Results (Broncos Score First) ==
LEGEND
Win
Draw
Loss

=== Preseason ===
Date	Competition	Vrs	H/A	Venue	Result	Score	Tries	Goals	Att	Live on TV	Report
21/01/2018	Friendly	Doncaster	Away	Keepmoat Stadium	W	22-16	Adebyi, Lovell, Sammut, Ioane	Sammut 3/3, Meadows 0/1|	-	-	Report
26/01/2018	Friendly	Hull Kingston Rovers	Away	Craven Park, Hull	L	18-24	Sammut, Pitts, Bienek	Sammut 3/3	-	-	Report

=== Betfred Championship ===
Date	Competition	Vrs	H/A	Venue	Result	Score	Tries	Goals	Att	Live on TV	Report
04/02/2018	Round 1	Barrow Raiders	Home	Trailfinders Sports Ground	W	56–12	Meadows, Williams, Harrison, Dixon, Battye, Sammut, Ioane, Cunningham, Davis, Walker	Sammut 8/10	801	-	Report
11/02/2018	Round 2	Dewsbury Rams	Away	Crown Flatt	W	12-0	Battye, Sammut	Sammut 2/3	795	-	Report
18/02/2018	Round 3	Featherstone Rovers	Home	Trailfinders Sports Ground	W	44–24	Sammut (3), Pitts, Walker, Dixon (2)	Sammut 7/7, Dixon 1/1	1,085	-	Report
25/02/2018	Round 4	Toronto Wolfpack	Home	Trailfinders Sports Ground	W	47–16	Pewhairangi, Davis, Williams, Johnstone, Walker (2), Cunningham	Sammut 6/7, Sammut 3/3 (Pens), Sammut 1DG	1,205	Premier Sports	Report
11/03/2018	Round 6	Batley Bulldogs	Home	Trailfinders Sports Ground	W	68-12	Dixon (4), Pewhairangi (2), Williams (2), Gee, S. Davis, Lovell, Cunningham	Sammut 6/7, Dixon 4/5	1,200	-	Report
25/03/2018	Round 7	Swinton Lions	Away	Heywood Road	W	64-18	Dixon (2), Walker (3), Lovell, Cunningham (2), Meadows, Bienek, Hellewell, Spencer	Dixon 8/13	518	-	Report
30/03/2018	Round 8	Toulouse Olympique	Home	Trailfinders Sports Ground	L	16-36	Pitts, Hellewell, Pewhairangi	Sammut 2/3	891	-	Report
02/04/2018	Round 9	Leigh Centurions	Away	Leigh Sports Village	L	18-31	Kear, Cunningham, Gee	Sammut 3/3	3,328	-	Report
08/04/2018	Round 10	Halifax	Away	The Shay	L	16-26	Williams, Kear, Lovell	Sammut 1/2, Dixon 1/1	1,595	-	Report
13/04/2018	Round 11	Rochdale Hornets	Away	Spotland Stadium	W	30-15	Dixon (3), Adebiyi (2)	Sammut 3/4, Dixon 2/2	312	-	Report
28/04/2018	Round 12	Dewsbury Rams	Home	Trailfinders Sports Ground	W	64-6	Pitts, Sammut (3), Davis (2), Evans, Lovell, Williams (2), Kear	Sammut 10/11	733	-	Report
06/05/2018	Round 13	Leigh Centurions	Home	Trailfinders Sports Ground	L	30-40	Williams, Walker, Gee, Meadows, Adebiyi	Sammut 5/5	1,340	-	Report
13/05/2018	Round 5	Sheffield Eagles	Away	Olympic Legacy Park	W	66-14	Pitts, Sammut (3), Adebiyi (2), Dixon (2), Ioane, Walker, Cunningham	Sammut 11/11	517	-	Report
20/05/2018	Round 14	Sheffield Eagles	Home	Trailfinders Sports Ground	W	46-12	Williams (2), Ioane, Gee (2), Sammut, Davis, Dixon	Sammut 7/8	771	-	Report
27/05/2018	Round 15	Toulouse Olympique	Summer Bash	Bloomfield Road	L	28-40	Sammut, Pitts, Evans, Williams (2)	Sammut 4/5	11,805	Sky Sports	Report
09/06/2018	Round 16	Toronto Wolfpack	Away	Lamport Stadium	L	12-32	Sammut, Kear	Sammut 2/2	7,384	Premier Sports	Report
17/06/2018	Round 17	Rochdale Hornets	Home	Trailfinders Sports Ground	W	68-0	Pitts (2), Dixon (2), Pewhairangi (3), Cunningham (2), Evans, Walker (2)	Dixon 10/12	684	-	Report
24/06/2018	Round 18	Swinton Lions	Home	Trailfinders Sports Ground	W	58-22	Williams, Dixon, Cunningham, Sammut (2), Kear, Pewhairangi, Davis, Pitts, Walker	Dixon 9/10	684	-	Report
01/07/2018	Round 19	Batley Bulldogs	Away	Mount Pleasant, Batley	W	38-16	Pewhairangi, Williams (2), Gee, Pitts, Dixon, Spencer	Dixon 5/7	889	-	Report
07/07/2018	Round 20	Toulouse Olympique	Away	Stade Ernest-Argelès	D	20-20	Cunningham, Davies, Battye	Dixon 4/4	2,544	-	Report
15/07/2018	Round 21	Halifax	Home	Trailfinders Sports Ground	W	20-18	Williams (2), Walker, Evans	Dixon 2/4	754	-	Report
22/07/2018	Round 22	Featherstone Rovers	Away	Post Office Road	W	14-7	Dixon, Walker, Sammut	Sammut	2,434	-	Report
29/07/2018	Round 23	Barrow Raiders	Away	Craven Park	W	72-6	Williams (3), Walker (3), Cunningham (2), Sammut (2), Harrison, Dixon, Pewhairangi	Sammut 6/7, Dixon 4/6	1,044	-	Report

=== The Super League Qualifiers - Super 8s ===
Date	Competition	Vrs	H/A	Venue	Result	Score	Tries	Goals	Att	Live on TV	Report
09/08/2018	Round 1	Widnes Vikings	Away	Halton Stadium	W	21-20	Ioane, Harrison, Dixon (2)	Sammut 2/4, Pewhairangi 1DG	3,432	Sky Sports	Report
19/08/2018	Round 2	Leeds Rhinos	Home	Trailfinders Sports Ground	L	32-48	Dixon, Williams (2), Hindmarsh, Evans, Hellewell	Sammut 4/6	1,904	-	Report
01/09/2018	Round 3	Toronto Wolfpack	Away	Lamport Stadium	L	22-34	Williams, Walker, Evans, Davis	Sammut 3/4	7,557	Sky Sports	Report
09/09/2018	Round 4	Toulouse Olympique	Home	Trailfinders Sports Ground	W	34-8	Cunningham, Dixon, Walker (2), Hellewell	Sammut 7/8	696	-	Report
15/09/2018	Round 5	Hull Kingston Rovers	Away	Craven Park, Hull	L	18-30	Sammut, Gee, Channing	Sammut 3/3	7,210	-	Report
22/09/2018	Round 6	Salford Red Devils	Home	Trailfinders Sports Ground	W	11-8	Pitts	Sammut 3/3, Sammut 1DG	809	-	Report
29/09/2018	Round 7	Halifax	Home	Trailfinders Sports Ground	W	23-18	Sammut, Pélissier, Dixon, Kear	Sammut 3/4, Sammut 1DG	869	Sky Sports	Report

=== The Million Pound Game ===
Date	Competition	Vrs	H/A	Venue	Result	Score	Tries	Goals	Att	Live on TV	Report
07/10/2018	Million Pound Game	Toronto Wolfpack	Away	Lamport Stadium	W	4-2	-	Sammut 2/2	9,266	Sky Sports	Report

=== Ladbrokes Challenge Cup ===
Date	Competition	Rnd	Vrs	H/A	Venue	Result	Score	Tries	Goals	Att	Live on TV	Report
18/03/2018	Challenge Cup	Round 4	Workington Town	Away	Derwent Park	W	22-20	Williams (2), Pewhairangi, Spencer	Dixon 3/4	548	-	Report
22/04/2018	Challenge Cup	Round 5	Leigh Centurions	Away	Leigh Sports Village	L	0-40			2,507	-	Report

== Player appearances ==
=== Betfred Championship ===
FB=Fullback (1)	W=Winger (2 & 5)	C=Centre (3 & 4)	SO=Stand Off (6)	SH=Scrum half (7)	P=Prop (8)	H=Hooker (9)	FR=Front Row (10)	SR=Second Row (11 & 12)	LF=Loose forward (13)	I=Interchange (14-17)

Squad No	Player	R1	R2	R3	R4	R6	R7	R8	R9	R10	R11	R12	R13	R5	R14	R15	R16	R17	R18	R19	R20	R21	R22	R23
1	Elliot Kear	x	x	x	x	x	x	x	W	C	W	C	C	C	C	C	W	C	C	C	C	C	C	C
2	Rhys Williams	W	W	W	W	W	W	W	W	W	W	W	W	W	W	W	W	W	W	W	W	W	W	W
3	Ben Hellewell	C	C	C	C	C	C	C	C	C	C	x	x	x	x	x	x	x	x	x	C	C	C	C
4	Matty Fleming	x	x	C	C	C	x	C	x	x	x	x	x	x	x	C	C	C	C	x	x	x	x	x
5	Kieran Dixon	W	W	W	W	W	W	W	x	W	FB	x	W	W	W	W	x	W	W	W	W	W	W	W
6	Api Pewhairangi	x	x	x	SO	SO	SO	SO	x	SO	SO	x	x	SO	x	x	C	SO	SO	SO	SO	SO	SO	SO
7	Jarrod Sammut	SH	SH	SH	SH	SH	x	SH	SH	SH	H	SH	SH	SH	SH	SH	SH	x	I	H	x	I	I	I
8	Tom Spencer	P	P	P	P	P	P	P	P	P	P	P	x	x	P	P	P	P	x	I	P	I	I	SR
9	James Cunningham	H	H	H	H	H	H	H	H	H	x	x	I	I	I	I	H	SH	SH	SH	SH	SH	SH	SH
10	Mark Ioane	FR	FR	FR	FR	FR	FR	FR	I	x	x	x	I	I	I	FR	FR	FR	P	I	I	I	I	I
11	Daniel Harrison	SR	SR	x	x	x	x	x	x	x	x	SR	SR	SR	x	SR	SR	x	x	x	I	I	I	I
12	Jay Pitts	SR	SR	SR	SR	SR	SR	SR	SR	SR	SR	SR	SR	SR	SR	SR	SR	SR	SR	SR	LF	SR	SR	LF
13	Matt Davis	LF	LF	LF	LF	LF	LF	LF	LF	LF	LF	H	H	H	H	H	LF	LF	LF	LF	H	LF	LF	x
14	Alex Walker	FB	FB	FB	FB	FB	FB	FB	FB	FB	x	FB	FB	FB	FB	FB	FB	FB	FB	FB	FB	FB	FB	FB
15	Eddie Battye	I	I	I	I	x	I	I	FR	I	FR	FR	FR	P	FR	LF	I	I	I	P	SR	P	P	P
16	Matty Gee	I	I	SR	x	I	SR	x	SR	x	x	I	I	I	I	I	I	x	I	I	I	x	x	x
17	Michael Channing	x	x	x	x	x	x	x	x	x	C	C	C	C	SO	SO	x	x	x	C	x	x	x	x
18	Ben Evans	x	x	x	x	x	x	x	x	x	x	I	P	FR	I	I	x	I	FR	FR	FR	FR	FR	FR
19	Sadiq Adebiyi	I	I	I	I	I	x	x	x	I	I	LF	LF	LF	LF	I	I	I	I	x	x	x	x	x
21	Will Lovell	C	C	x	SR	SR	C	SR	C	SR	SR	I	I	I	C	x	x	x	x	x	x	x	x	x
23	Rob Butler	x	x	x	I	I	I	I	I	I	x	x	x	x	x	x	x	x	x	x	x	x	x	I
24	Jacob Ogden	x	x	x	x	x	x	x	x	x	x	W	x	x	x	x	x	x	x	x	x	x	x	x
25	Matt Davies	x	x	x	x	x	x	x	x	x	x	I	x	x	x	x	I	H	H	I	I	x	x	x
26	Daniel Hindmarsh	x	x	x	x	x	x	x	x	x	I	x	x	x	SR	x	x	SR	SR	SR	SR	SR	SR	SR
27	James Meadows	SO	SO	SO	x	x	SH	x	SO	x	SH	SO	SO	x	x	x	SO	x	x	x	x	x	x	x
29	Sam Davis	I	x	x	x	I	I	I	I	I	I	x	x	x	x	x	x	I	x	x	x	x	x	x
30	Éloi Pélissier	x	x	x	x	x	x	x	x	x	x	x	x	x	x	x	x	x	x	x	x	H	H	H
31	Daymeric Pelo	x	x	x	x	x	x	x	x	x	x	x	x	x	x	x	x	x	x	x	x	x	x	x
	Lewis Bienek	x	x	I	x	(Note: Joined Hull FC, immediately loaned back to the Broncos for the remainder of the season)	I	I	I	FR	I	(Note: Ended loan period back at the Broncos and returned to Hull FC)	-	-	-	-	-	-	-	-	-	-	-	-
	Jordan Johnstone	(Note: Joined on loan from Widnes Vikings)	x	I	I	I	(Note: Ended loan period and returned to Widnes Vikings)	-	-	-	-	-	-	-	-	-	-	-	-	-	-	-	-	-

=== The Super League Qualifiers - Super 8s & Million Pound Game ===
FB=Fullback (1)	W=Winger (2 & 5)	C=Centre (3 & 4)	SO=Stand Off (6)	SH=Scrum half (7)	P=Prop (8)	H=Hooker (9)	FR=Front Row (10)	SR=Second Row (11 & 12)	LF=Loose forward (13)	I=Interchange (14-17)

Squad No	Player	R1	R2	R3	R4	R5	R6	R7	MPG
1	Elliot Kear	C	C	C	C	C	C	C	C
2	Rhys Williams	W	W	W	W	W	W	W	W
3	Ben Hellewell	C	C	C	C	C	C	C	C
4	Matty Fleming	x	x	x	x	x	x	x	x
5	Kieran Dixon	W	W	W	W	x	W	W	W
6	Api Pewhairangi	SO	SO	x	x	x	x	x	x
7	Jarrod Sammut	I	I	SH	SH	SH	SH	SH	SH
8	Tom Spencer	I	I	I	x	x	I	I	I
9	James Cunningham	SH	SH	SO	SO	SO	x	x	x
10	Mark Ioane	I	I	I	P	P	P	P	P
11	Daniel Harrison	I	I	I	I	x	x	x	x
12	Jay Pitts	SR	SR	SR	SR	SR	SO	SO	SO
13	Matt Davis	LF	LF	LF	H	H	H	x	x
14	Alex Walker	FB	FB	FB	FB	FB	FB	FB	FB
15	Eddie Battye	P	P	P	LF	LF	LF	LF	I
16	Matt Gee	x	x	I	I	I	SR	SR	SR
17	Michael Channing	x	x	x	x	W	x	x	x
18	Ben Evans	FR	FR	FR	FR	FR	FR	FR	FR
19	Sadiq Adebiyi	x	x	x	I	I	I	I	x
21	Will Lovell	x	x	x	x	I	x	I	SR
23	Rob Butler	x	x	x	x	x	I	x	I
24	Jacob Ogden	x	x	x	x	x	x	x	x
25	Matt Davies	x	x	x	x	x	x	I	I
26	Daniel Hindmarsh	SR	SR	SR	SR	SR	SR	SR	LF
27	James Meadows	x	x	x	x	x	x	x	x
29	Sam Davis	x	x	x	x	x	x	x	x
30	Éloi Pélissier	H	H	H	I	I	I	H	H
31	Daymeric Pelo	x	x	x	x	x	x	x	x
	Lewis Bienek	x	x	x	x	x	x	x	x
	Jordan Johnstone	x	x	x	x	x	x	x	x

=== Ladbrokes Challenge Cup ===
FB=Fullback (1)	W=Winger (2 & 5)	C=Centre (3 & 4)	SO=Stand Off (6)	SH=Scrum half (7)	P=Prop (8)	H=Hooker (9)	FR=Front Row (10)	SR=Second Row (11 & 12)	LF=Loose forward (13)	I=Interchange (14-17)

Squad No	Player	R4	R5
1	Elliot Kear	FB	W
2	Rhys Williams	W	W
3	Ben Hellewell	x	x
4	Matty Fleming	C	C
5	Kieran Dixon	W	FB
6	Api Pewhairangi	SO	SO
7	Jarrod Sammut	x	H
8	Tom Spencer	P	P
9	James Cunningham	H	x
10	Mark Ioane	x	x
11	Daniel Harrison	x	x
12	Jay Pitts	SR	SR
13	Matt Davis	x	LF
14	Alex Walker	x	x
15	Eddie Battye	I	FR
16	Matty Gee	LF	SR
17	Michael Channing	x	C
18	Ben Evans	x	x
19	Sadiq Adebiyi	x	I
21	Will Lovell	SR	I
23	Rob Butler	I	x
24	Jacob Ogden	C	x
25	Matt Davies	x	x
26	Daniel Hindmarsh	I	x
27	James Meadows	SH	SH
29	Sam Davis	I	I
30	Éloi Pélissier	x	x
31	Daymeric Pelo	x	x
	Lewis Bienek	FR	I
	Jordan Johnstone	x	x

== Squad statistics ==
- Appearances and Points include (Betfred Championship, Ladbrokes Challenge Cup, Super League Qualifiers and the Million Pound Game) as of 8 October 2018.

Squad No	Player	International Country	Position	Age	Previous club	Apps	Tries	Goals	DG	Points
1	Elliot Kear	(Wales)	Centre	29	London Welsh (RU)	26	6	0	0	24
2	Rhys Williams	(Wales)	Wing	28	Central Queensland Capras	33	25	0	0	100
3	Ben Hellewell	(Scotland)	Centre	26	Featherstone Rovers	22	4	0	0	16
4	Matty Fleming	(England)	Centre	22	St Helens	10	0	0	0	0
5	Kieran Dixon	(England)	Wing	26	Hull Kingston Rovers	29	26	53	0	210
6	Api Pewhairangi	(Ireland)	Stand off	26	Connacht (RU)	19	11	0	0	44
7	Jarrod Sammut	(Malta)	Scrum half	31	Workington Town	29	21	114	4	316
8	Tom Spencer	(England)	Prop	27	Leigh Centurions	28	3	0	0	12
9	James Cunningham	(England)	Hooker	24	Hull F.C.	27	14	0	0	56
10	Mark Ioane	(New Zealand)	Prop	27	St George Illawarra	28	4	0	0	16
11	Daniel Harrison	(Australia)	Second row	30	Manly Sea Eagles	15	3	0	0	12
12	Jay Pitts	(England)	Second row	28	Bradford Bulls	33	10	0	0	40
13	Matt Davis	(England)	Loose forward	22	London Broncos Academy	29	7	0	0	28
14	Alex Walker	(Scotland)	Full back	23	London Broncos Academy	30	20	0	0	80
15	Eddie Battye	(England)	Prop	27	Sheffield Eagles	32	3	0	0	12
16	Matty Gee	(England)	Second row	23	Salford Red Devils	23	7	0	0	28
17	Michael Channing	(Wales)	Centre	26	London Broncos Academy	9	1	0	0	4
18	Ben Evans	(Wales)	Prop	25	Warrington Wolves	20	6	0	0	24
19	Sadiq Adebiyi	(England)	Loose forward	21	London Broncos Academy	20	5	0	0	20
21	Will Lovell	(England)	Second row	25	London Skolars	18	4	0	0	16
23	Rob Butler	(England)	Second row	20	London Broncos Academy	10	0	0	0	0
24	Jacob Ogden	(Jamaica)	Centre	20	London Broncos Academy	2	0	0	0	0
25	Matt Davies	(England)	Hooker	20	London Broncos Academy	8	1	0	0	4
26	Daniel Hindmarsh	(England)	Second row	20	London Broncos Academy	18	1	0	0	4
27	James Meadows	(England)	Stand off	19	London Broncos Academy	11	3	0	0	12
29	Sam Davis	(England)	Hooker	20	London Broncos Academy	10	1	0	0	4
30	Éloi Pélissier	(France)	Hooker	27	Lézignan Sangliers	11	1	0	0	4
31	Daymeric Pelo	(French Polynesia)	Prop	27	Limoux Grizzlies	0	0	0	0	0
	Lewis Bienek (Note: No longer at the club)	(England)	Prop	20	London Broncos Academy	8	1	0	0	4
	Jordan Johnstone (Note: No longer at the club)	(England)	Scrum half	21	Widnes Vikings (Loan)	3	1	0	0	4

== Tale of the Tape ==
Most Points in a Game

- 34, Round 5: Jarrod Sammut vs. Sheffield Eagles (3 tries & 11 Goals)

Most tries in a Game

- 4, Round 6: Kieran Dixon vs. Batley Bulldogs

Highest score in a winning game

- 72, Round 23: vs. Barrow Raiders

Lowest score in a winning game

- 4, Million Pound Game: vs. Toronto Wolfpack

Greatest winning margin

- 68, Round 17: vs. Rochdale Hornets

Greatest number of games won consecutively

- 7, Round 1 to Round 7 (The Round 5 away fixture at Sheffield Eagles on 4 March was postponed and rescheduled for later in the season). Includes the win at Workington Town in Challenge Cup Round 4

Highest score in a losing game

- 32, Super League Qualifiers Round 2: vs. Leeds Rhinos

Lowest score in a losing game

- 0, Challenge Cup Round 5: vs. Leigh Centurions

Greatest losing margin

- 40, Challenge Cup Round 5: vs. Leigh Centurions

Greatest number of games lost consecutively

- 3, Round 8 to Round 10

== Transfers ==
=== In ===
Country	Name	Position	Signed from	Date
(England)	Matty Fleming	Centre	St Helens	November 2017
(England)	Will Lovell	Centre	London Broncos Academy	November 2017
(England)	Jordan Johnstone	Scrum half	Widnes Vikings (Loan)	February 2018
(England)	Lewis Bienek	Prop	Hull F.C. (Loan until end of the season)	March 2018
(France)	Daymeric Pelo	Prop	Limoux Grizzlies (Until end of the season)	July 2018
(France)	Éloi Pélissier	Hooker	Lézignan Sangliers (Until end of the season)	July 2018

=== Out ===
Country	Name	Position	Club Signed	Date
(England)	Dalton Grant	Wing	Bradford Bulls	December 2017
(England)	Jordan Johnstone	Scrum half	Widnes Vikings (End of Loan)	March 2018
(England)	Lewis Bienek	Prop	Hull F.C.	March 2018
(England)	Lewis Bienek	Prop	Hull F.C. (End of Loan)	May 2018
(England)	Matt Davis	Hooker	Warrington Wolves	June 2018 - 2-year deal, starting in 2019 season
(England)	Michael Channing	Centre	Retirement	October 2018

== Awards ==
=== Trophy Cabinet ===
- Million Pound Game Trophy

=== London Broncos Awards Night ===
Held at Doubletree by Hilton Hotel, London-Ealing on Tuesday 9 October.

- London Broncos Men of Steel: Jay Pitts and Rhys Williams
- London Broncos Chairmans Player of the Year: Alex Walker
- London Broncos Players Player of the Year: Matt Davis
- London Broncos Young Player of the Year: Daniel Hindmarsh
