= Apirana =

Apirana is a family and male given name of New Zealand Māori origin meaning 'Pleasant; Kind' and may refer to:

- Apirana Mahuika (1934–2015), Māori tribal leader
- Āpirana Ngata (1874–1950), politician and lawyer
- Api Pewhairangi (born 1992), Ireland rugby league player
- Apirana Taylor (born 1956), poet and novelist
