= Tawhai (disambiguation) =

Tawhai is a genus of spiders.

Tawhai may also refer to:

== Plants ==
- Tāwhai, species of evergreen tree endemic to New Zealand, more commonly known as Nothofagus menziesii
- Tāwhai pango, species of evergreen tree endemic to New Zealand, more commonly known as Nothofagus solandri
- Tāwhai raunui, species of evergreen tree endemic to New Zealand, more commonly known as Nothofagus fusca

== People ==
- Alice Tawhai, New Zealand writer
- Hōne Tāwhai (c. 1827–1894), Māori member of the New Zealand parliament
- Latham Tawhai (born 1972), former New Zealand Māori international rugby league footballer and coach
- Merryn Tawhai, New Zealand academic
- Veronica Tawhai, New Zealand academic

== See also ==
- HMNZS Tawhai, Castle-class trawler built for the Royal New Zealand Navy during World War II
- Tawhai Hill, hill in New Zealand
- Tawhai School, school in the Stokes Valley suburb of Lower Hutt, New Zealand
