= Jimmy Meadows (rugby league) =

English rugby league footballer

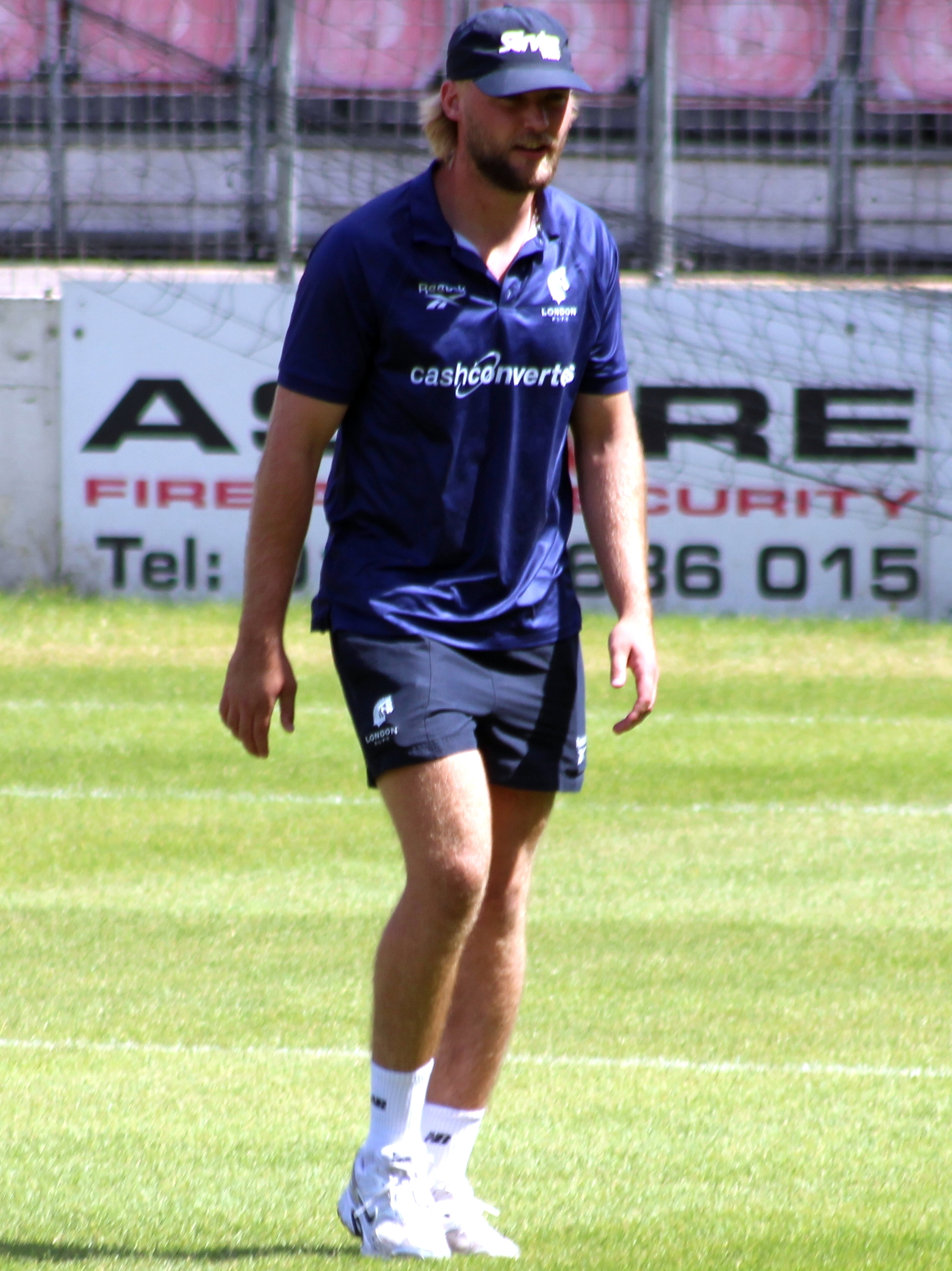

Personal information
- Full name: James Meadows
- Born: 15 May 1999 (age 27) Teddington, London, England

Playing information
- Position: Stand-off, Scrum-half, Fullback, Hooker
Club
Years	Team	Pld	T	G	FG	P
2018–21	London Broncos	37	5	0	0	20
2018(loan)	→ London Skolars	2	1	0	0	4
2019(loan)	→ Coventry Bears	1	0	0	0	0
2019(loan)	→ London Skolars	3	1	0	0	4
2019(loan)	→ Sheffield Eagles	7	4	0	0	16
2022–23	Batley Bulldogs	60	22	61	0	210
2024	London Broncos	18	2	0	0	8
2025	Bradford Bulls	20	3	5	0	26
2026–	London Broncos	26	10	150	0	340
	Total	174	48	216	0	628
- Source: As of 8 October 2026

James Meadows (born 15 May 1999) is an English professional rugby league footballer who plays as a stand-off, scrum-half, hooker or fullback for the London Broncos in the Super League.

He previously played for the London Broncos in the Super League and the Championship, and spent time on loan from the Broncos at the London Skolars and the Coventry Bears in League 1, and the Sheffield Eagles in the Betfred Championship. Meadows has also played for the Batley Bulldogs and the Bradford Bulls in the Championship.

== Career ==
=== London Broncos ===
Meadows made his professional début for the London Broncos against the Barrow Raiders on 4 February 2018 in round 1 of the Championship.

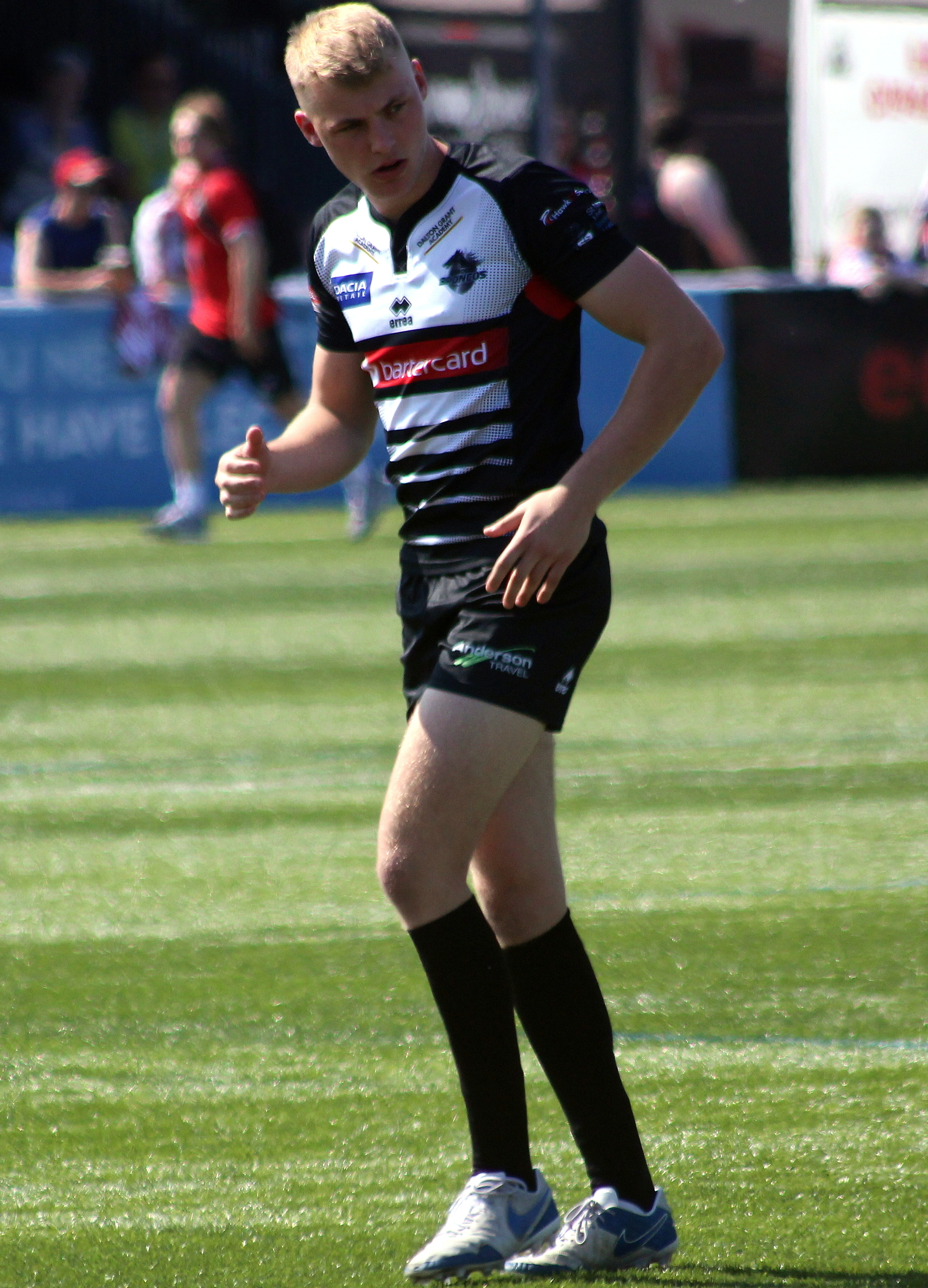
Meadows playing for the London Broncos in 2018

=== Batley Bulldogs ===
On 12 October 2021, it was reported that he had signed for the Batley Bulldogs in the RFL Championship

He is now head coach of University of Leeds Rugby League team alongside his team mates Aidan McGowan (Backs and fighting coach) and Josh Hodson (Middles and Wrestling coach).

=== London Broncos (re-join) ===
On 10 November 2023 it was reported that he had re-signed for the London Broncos in the Super League.

=== Bradford Bulls ===
On 3 July 2024 it was reported that he had signed for Bradford in the RFL Championship.

=== London Broncos (re-join) ===
On 4 December 2025 it was reported that he had re-joined the London Broncos in the RFL Championship.

In February 2026 Meadows set a new club record of 42 points in a game. He scored two tries and converted 17 out of 18 attempts at goal in London's win over the North Wales Crusaders at Plough Lane.

In August 2026, he was part of the Broncos squad that lifted the RFL Championship Leaders' Shield.

In October 2026, he played in the Broncos Championship Grand Final victory over Doncaster at Plough Lane.

In 2026 he was part of the London Broncos squad that secured their historic treble of League Leaders' Shield, 1895 Cup and Grand Final victories.

== Club statistics ==
Year	Club	League Competition	Appearances	Tries	Goals	Drop goals	Points	Notes
2018	London Broncos	Championship	11	3	0	0	12	
2018	London Skolars	League 1	2	1	0	0	4	loan
2019	London Broncos	Super League	2	0	0	0	0	
2019	Coventry Bears	League 1	1	0	0	0	0	loan
2019	London Skolars	League 1	3	1	0	0	4	loan
2019	Sheffield Eagles	Championship	7	4	0	0	16	loan
2020	London Broncos	Championship	5	0	0	0	0	
2021	London Broncos	Championship	19	2	0	0	8	
2022	Batley Bulldogs	Championship	29	5	0	0	20	
2023	Batley Bulldogs	Championship	31	17	61	0	190	
2024	London Broncos	Super League	18	2	0	0	8	
2025	Bradford Bulls	Championship	20	3	5	0	26	
2026	London Broncos	Championship	26	10	150	0	340	
Club career total			174	48	216	0	628	
