= Dan Hindmarsh =

English rugby league footballer

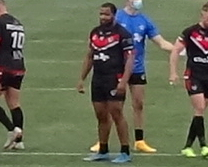

Personal information
- Full name: Daniel Hindmarsh-Takyi
- Born: 8 October 1998 (age 26); London, England

Playing information
- Position: Prop, Second-row, Loose forward
Club
Years	Team	Pld	T	G	FG	P
2017–21	London Broncos	48	4	0	0	16
2017(loan)	→ Oxford	7	1	0	0	4
2019(DR)	→ London Skolars	10	0	0	0	0
2019(DR)	→ Sheffield Eagles	2	0	0	0	0
2019(DR)	→ Coventry Bears	1	0	0	0	0
2023	Northern Pride RLFC	21	2	0	0	8
2024	Castleford Tigers	8	0	0	0	0
2024(DR)	→ Newcastle Thunder	1	0	0	0	0
2024(loan)	→ Whitehaven RLFC	5	0	0	0	0
	Total	103	7	0	0	28
- Source: As of 7 October 2024

Daniel Hindmarsh-Takyi (born 8 October 1998), also known as Dan Hindmarsh, is an English professional rugby league footballer who last played as a prop, second-row or loose forward for the Castleford Tigers in the Super League.

He has previously played for the London Broncos in both the Championship and the Super League, and for Northern Pride in the Queensland Cup. He has spent time on loan and dual registration at Oxford RL, the London Skolars, the Coventry Bears and Newcastle Thunder in League 1, and at the Sheffield Eagles and Whitehaven in the Championship.

== Background ==
Hindmarsh-Takyi hails from North London, England.

He originally took up rugby league with the London Skolars, where he played for a year. In 2015, he joined the London Broncos scholarship programme. He was named Academy Player of the Year for 2016.

== Playing career ==
=== London Broncos ===
After progressing through the London Broncos academy system, Hindmarsh-Takyi signed his first professional deal with the club in July 2017, agreeing to a two-year contract. He spent the 2017 season playing for Oxford Rugby League in League 1, where he made seven appearances and scored one try.

On 18 March 2018, Hindmarsh-Takyi made his London Broncos debut against Workington Town in Round 4 of the Challenge Cup. He scored his first try for the Broncos on 19 August against the Leeds Rhinos in the Super 8s Qualifiers. He played in the 2018 Million Pound Game victory over Toronto Wolfpack at the Lamport Stadium. He made a total of 18 appearances in his breakthrough year, and was named Young Player of the Year at the club's end-of-season awards.

Following London's promotion to the Super League for the 2019 season, Hindmarsh-Takyi made his top-flight debut on 27 April against the Salford Red Devils. Throughout the season, he also spent time with the Broncos' dual registration partners: the Sheffield Eagles in the Championship, and both the London Skolars and the Coventry Bears in League 1. In August 2019, it was announced that Hindmarsh-Takyi had signed a new two-year deal with the Broncos, extending his stay until the end of 2021.

Hindmarsh-Takyi made four appearances for London in the 2020 season, scoring two tries against Whitehaven and York, before the league was abandoned due to COVID-19. For the 2021 season, he was allocated squad number 16. He made twenty appearances and scored one try against Oldham. He departed the club at the end of the year upon the expiry of his contract.

=== Northern Pride RLFC ===
Hindmarsh-Takyi spent 2022 playing for Cairns Brothers RLFC as they won the Cairns District Rugby League, a tier three Australian competition. The following year, he began playing for parent club Northern Pride RLFC in the Queensland Cup competition. He made 21 appearances, scoring two tries, and ranked second in the division for post-contact metres. In late 2023, he explored a train and trial deal at Brisbane Broncos, but a move to the NRL ultimately did not come to fruition.

=== Castleford Tigers ===
On 5 February 2024, it was announced that Hindmarsh-Takyi had signed for the Castleford Tigers in the Super League on a two-year deal. Director of rugby Danny Wilson said that the Tigers had identified him as a target during the previous season and that "he fits that mould of the type of player we want to bring in to Castleford; young, enthusiastic and wants to achieve."

==== Whitehaven R.L.F.C. (loan) ====
On 26 April 2024, it was announced that Hindmarsh-Takyi would join Whitehaven in the RFL Championship on a two-week loan deal from Castleford.
