= Maria Bargh =

Political scientist in New Zealand

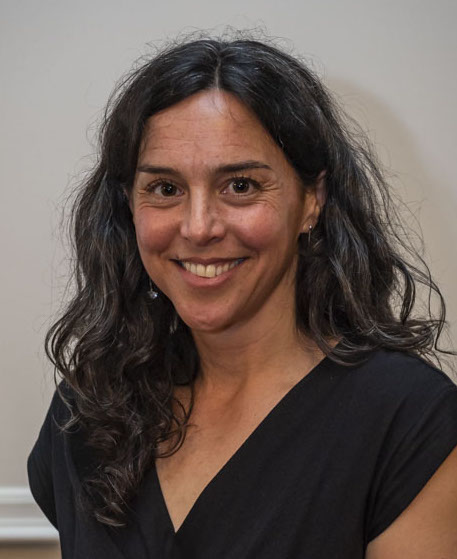
- Bargh in 2020
- Born: Ema Maria Bargh
- Awards: Te Puāwaitanga Research Excellence Award

Academic background
- Education: Australian National University
- Thesis: Re-colonisation and indigenous resistance: neoliberalism in the Pacific (2002)
- Doctoral advisor: Barry Hindess

Academic work
- Institutions: Victoria University of Wellington

Ema Maria Bargh is a New Zealand academic, and is Professor of Politics and Māori Studies at Victoria University of Wellington. Bargh's research covers Māori political representation and constitutional change, environmental politics and policy, and the political economy. She was Deputy Chair of the Independent Review of Electoral Law, and is co-editor of the MAI Journal and a member of the editorial board of the New Zealand Political Science Journal. Bargh was awarded the Te Puāwaitanga Research Award by the Royal Society Te Apārangi in 2020.

== Early life ==
Bargh is of Te Arawa and Ngāti Awa descent.

== Academic career ==
Bargh completed a PhD titled Re-colonisation and indigenous resistance: neoliberalism in the Pacific at the Australian National University, under the supervision of Barry Hindess. Bargh joined the staff of Victoria University of Wellington, rising to full professor in 2022.

Bargh's research covers Māori political representation and constitutional change, environmental politics and policy, and the political economy. She was on the Matike Mai Aotearoa working group on constitutional reform. Bargh has been appointed by Cabinet to the role of Deputy Chair of the Independent Review of Electoral Law, alongside Deborah Hart, Andrew Geddis, Alice Mander, Robert Pedden and Lara Greaves. She is co-editor of the MAI Journal: A New Zealand Journal of Indigenous Scholarship, and is on the editorial board for the New Zealand Political Science Journal. Bargh has published several books, three of which were included in Books of Mana as being in the 180 most significant works of Māori-authored non-fiction. These books were A Hidden Economy: Māori in the privatised military industry, published in 2015, Māori and Parliament: Diverse strategies and compromises (2010), and Resistance: An Indigenous response to neoliberalism (2007).

== Honours and awards ==
Bargh received a Royal Society Te Apārangi Te Puāwaitanga Research Award in 2020.

She received a University Engagement Excellence Award in 2017 and a Research Excellence Award in 2021.

== Selected works ==
- Bargh, Ema Maria (2011). "The Triumph of Maori Entrepreneurs or Diverse Economies?". Aboriginal Policy Studies. 1 (3). doi:10.5663/aps.v1i3.12560. Wikidata Q117473145.
- Bargh, Ema Maria (2006). "Changing the game plan: The Foreshore and Seabed Act and constitutional change". Kotuitui: New Zealand Journal Of Social Sciences Online. 1 (1): 13–24. doi:10.1080/1177083x.2006.9522408. Wikidata Q117473146.
- Bargh, Ema Maria; Otter, Jacob (2009). "Progressive spaces of neoliberalism in Aotearoa: A genealogy and critique". Asia Pacific Viewpoint. 50 (2): 154–165. doi:10.1111/j.1467-8373.2009.01390.x. Wikidata Q117473147.
- Bargh, Ema Maria (2012). "Rethinking and re‐shaping indigenous economies: Māori geothermal energy enterprises". Journal of Enterprising Communities. 6 (3): 271–283. doi:10.1108/17506201211258423. Wikidata Q117473148.
- Bargh, Ema Maria (2014). "A Blue Economy for Aotearoa New Zealand?". Environment, Development and Sustainability. 16 (3): 459–470. doi:10.1007/s10668-013-9487-4. Wikidata Q117473152.
- Bargh, Ema Maria (2013). "Multiple sites of Māori political participation". Australian Journal of Political Science. 48 (4): 445–455. doi:10.1080/10361146.2013.841123. Wikidata Q56483790.
- Bargh, Ema Maria; Douglas, Sarsha Leigh; One, Annie Sarah Elizabeth (2014). "Fostering sustainable tribal economies in a time of climate change". New Zealand Geographer. 70 (2): 103–115. doi:10.1111/nzg.12042. Wikidata Q117473154.
- Bargh, Ema Maria; Van Wagner, Estair (2019). "Participation as exclusion: Māori engagement with the Crown Minerals Act 1991 Block Offer process". Journal of Human Rights and the Environment. 10 (1): 118–139. doi:10.4337/jhre.2019.01.06. Wikidata Q117473155.
