= Barry Hindess =

Sociologist (1939–2018)

Barry Hindess FASSA (11 July 1939 — 19 May 2018) was an emeritus Professor in the School of Social Sciences at Australian National University. He was for many years an academic sociologist in the UK (mainly at the University of Liverpool) and has published widely on social and political theory, and on the history of political thought.

Hindess was one of the editors of Theoretical Practice which in the 1970s critically examined the Structural Marxism of Louis Althusser. With other editors such as his former pupil, Paul Hirst, Tony Cutler and Athar Hussain, this interrogation eventually undermined their original support for Althusser. One of Hindess's doctoral students is Maria Bargh, Professor of Politics and Māori Studies at Victoria University of Wellington in New Zealand.

Hindess held a BA from Oxford University, and a MA and PhD from University of Liverpool. He was elected Fellow of the Academy of the Social Sciences in Australia in the political science discipline in 1995.

== Selected works ==
- (1971) Decline of Working Class Politics, MacGibbon & Kee
- (1975) with Paul Hirst, Pre-Capitalist Modes of Production, London: Routledge & Kegan Paul
- (1996) Discourses of power: from Hobbes to Foucault, Wiley-Blackwell
- (1988) Choice, rationality, and social theory, Routledge
- (1998) co-edited with Mitchell Dean, Governing Australia : Studies in contemporary rationalities of government, Cambridge University Press
- (2004) co-edited with Marian Sawer, Us and Them : Anti-elitism in Australia, API Network, Australia Research Institute, Curtin University of Technology
