= Amy Spencer =

British sprinter

Amy Spencer (born 19 September 1985) is a retired English sprinter.

She was born in Wigan, Greater Manchester, and came to fame as a teenager. In 1998 she won a British U13 best for 80m and the next year won the AAA U15 200m title. In 2001, she was voted BBC Young Sports Personality of the Year.

She specialised in the 200 metres, and won the silver medal at the 2001 World Youth Championships and finished seventh at the 2002 World Junior Championships. At the 2002 World Junior Championships she also won a bronze medal in the 4 x 100 metres relay and a silver medal in the 4 x 400 metres relay. In 2003, she competed at the 2003 World Indoor Championships without reaching the final and finished fourth at the 2003 European Junior Championships.

Her personal best time was 23.20 seconds, achieved on the indoor track in March 2003 in Birmingham. Her outdoor personal best was 23.45 seconds. She also had 11.66 seconds in the 100 metres, achieved in June 2001 in Mannheim.

"Athletics Weekly" revealed that Spencer quit athletics in 2005. She ran with the Belgrave Harriers club.

Her younger brother, Tom Spencer, is a professional rugby league footballer who made his senior debut for Wigan Warriors in the Super League in 2012.
