= Matike Mai Aotearoa =

Constitutional working group in New Zealand

Matike Mai Aotearoa: Independent Working Group on Constitutional Transformation is a Māori initiative made up of constitutional experts and respected Māori leaders who consulted Māori between 2012 and 2015 and generated a report on constitutional transformation for Aotearoa New Zealand. The report was launched on Waitangi Day in 2016.

== History, process and outcomes ==
Since 2005 the National Iwi Chairs Forum, a group of 72 chairpersons from iwi (Māori nations), have convened four meetings a year for Māori people to exchange information with the goal to share and support each other. In 2010 the Iwi Chairs Forum established a Working Group for Constitutional Change in response to the 'ongoing persistent exercise of the Crown of constitutional power without apparent Māori input.'

The working group had the following terms of reference for consultation and a report: “To develop and implement a model for an inclusive Constitution for Aotearoa based on tikanga and kawa, He Whakaputanga o te Rangatiratanga o Niu Tireni of 1835, Te Tiriti o Waitangi of 1840, and other indigenous human rights instruments which enjoy a wide degree of international recognition”.

Professor Margaret Mutu has held the role of chairperson since the inception, and the convener was Moana Jackson who died in March 2022. The working group had a clear mandate to consult Māori and initially proposed 30 hui (Māori meetings), but responded to requests. In the end 252 hui were held all throughout New Zealand between 2012 and 2015. The first hui was held at Waipatu marae with Ngāti Kahungunu, Jackson's home base. The aim was to be comprehensive and inclusive; hui were therefore held with iwi and also with other groups such as organisations for Māori people with disabilities, Māori LGBTQI groups, gangs and churches. Jackson attended all 252 hui. Extensive discussion and debate of values for a constitution were part of the hui.

The Matike Mai Working Group had over 10,000 people attend and over 800 written submissions. Funding and support for the hui was granted mostly by JR McKenzie Trust. Other sources included groups who were hosting and some research funding from University of Auckland. Kayleen Neho was project manager. Transcripts were produced from the hui and then smaller follow-up meetings occurred to clarify certain points or to expand on the findings.

The report was launched on Waitangi Day 2016. There were seven recommendations from the report relating to future actions. In February 2021 there was a Matike Mai Constitutional Convention, which was one of the recommendations. It took place online rather than in-person due to Covid-19 restrictions.

The Matike Mai report is part of a landscape of constitutional work in recent times including two other expert-led dialogues by the Constitutional Advisory Panel published by the New Zealand Government (2013) and Constitution Aotearoa led by Sir Geoffrey Palmer and Andrew Butler (2017).

He Puapua is a report commissioned by New Zealand government agency Te Puni Kōkiri in 2019 to create a plan to realise the UN declaration on the rights of Indigenous peoples (UNDRIP) in New Zealand. This report includes reference to the Matike Mai Aotearoa Report.

=== Contributing members of the working group ===
During the development of the report there were 28 contributing members to the working group as listed in the appendix of the report, as follows:

- Jaroz Adams
- Awanui Black
- Dr. Maria Bargh
- Rikirangi Gage
- Te Huia Bill Hamilton
- Moana Jackson
- Dr. Carwyn Jones
- Vapi Kupenga (Kaumātua)
- Apirana Mahuika (1934 – 2015) (Kaumātua)
- Ani Mikaere
- Professor Margaret Mutu
- Mereana Pitman
- Dr. Helen Potter
- Willow-Jean Prime
- Malcolm Mulholland
- Tania Rangiheuea
- George Riley
- Hone Sadler (Kaumātua)
- Mike Smith (Video Production)
- Kingi Snelgar
- Dayle Takitimu
- Veronica Tawhai
- Dr. Joseph Te Rito
- Kukupa Tirikatene (Kaumātua)
- Kiri Toki
- Valmaine Toki
- Huirangi Waikerepuru (Kaumātua)
- Lily Wilcox (Kaumātua)

== Rangatahi rōpū (youth group) ==
Veronica Tawhai co-ordinated Matike Mai Aotearoa Rangatahi Youth for Constitutional Transformation to get perspectives from young people and 70 meetings and workshops were held around New Zealand. This ended up being a comprehensive report in its own right drawing from thirteen different regional groups and ran between 2012 and 2017. Members included spokesperson Ngaa Rauuira Puumanawawhiti and Pania Newton. The workshops used digital media and theatrical group activities to gain perspectives with young people at secondary schools, Wharekura, tertiary providers, community centres and youth justice centres. Puumanawhiti said: "Young voices are often not valued or are ignored, yet we are the ones who will shape our future constitution". Matike Mai Aotearoa Rangatahi Youth for Constitutional Transformation was funded by the JR McKenzie Trust, the UN Trust Fund on Indigenous Issues and the New Zealand National Commission for UNESCO.
