= Matt Davies (rugby league) =

British rugby league footballer

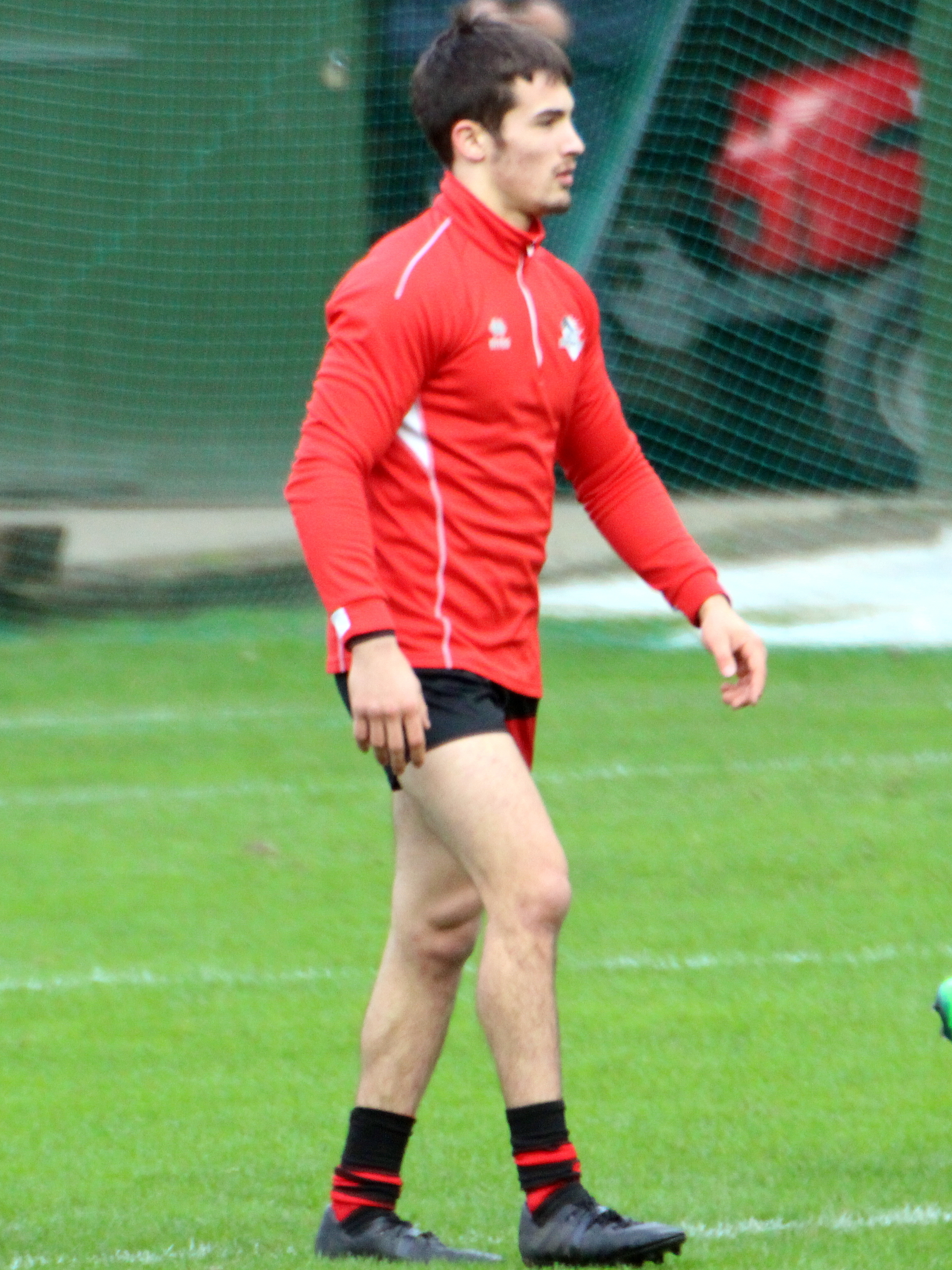

Personal information
- Full name: Matthew Davies
- Born: 9 April 1998 (age 28) Guildford, Surrey, England

Playing information
- Position: Hooker, Scrum-half
Club
| Years | Team | Pld | T | G | FG | P |
|---|---|---|---|---|---|---|
| 2018–22 | London Broncos | 9 | 1 | 0 | 0 | 4 |
| 2018(loan) | → London Skolars | 7 | 0 | 0 | 0 | 0 |
| 2019(loan) | → Coventry Bears | 2 | 0 | 0 | 0 | 0 |
| 2019(loan) | → London Skolars | 6 | 0 | 0 | 0 | 0 |
| 2023–23 | Cairns Brothers | 6 | 0 | 0 | 0 | 0 |
| 2023–24 | London Broncos | 8 | 0 | 0 | 0 | 0 |
| 2025– | Cairns Brothers | 0 | 0 | 0 | 0 | 0 |
| | Total | 38 | 1 | 0 | 0 | 4 |
- Source: As of 01 August 2025

Matt Davies (born 9 April 1998) is a professional rugby league footballer who plays as a hooker for the Cairns Brothers who play in Cairns District Rugby League.

He played for the London Broncos in the Super League, and has spent time on loan from the Broncos at the London Skolars, Oxford and the Coventry Bears in League 1.

== Background ==
Davies was born in Guildford, Surrey, England.

Junior Rugby League was played at Elmbridge Eagles.

== Career ==
In 2018 Davies made his professional début for the London Broncos against the Dewsbury Rams in Round 12 of the Championship. He played off the bench in the Million Pound Game on 7 October 2018 against Toronto Wolfpack helping London Broncos return to Super League.

On 5 April 2019 he made his full Super League début for the London Broncos against the Warrington Wolves.

Early in 2023 he played in Cairns Brothers in Australia.

On 15 October 2023, he played in the London Broncos upset Million Pound Game victory over Toulouse Olympique.

February 2025 returned to play for Cairns Brothers who play in Cairns District Rugby League in Australia.
