= Tom Spencer (rugby league) =

English rugby league footballer

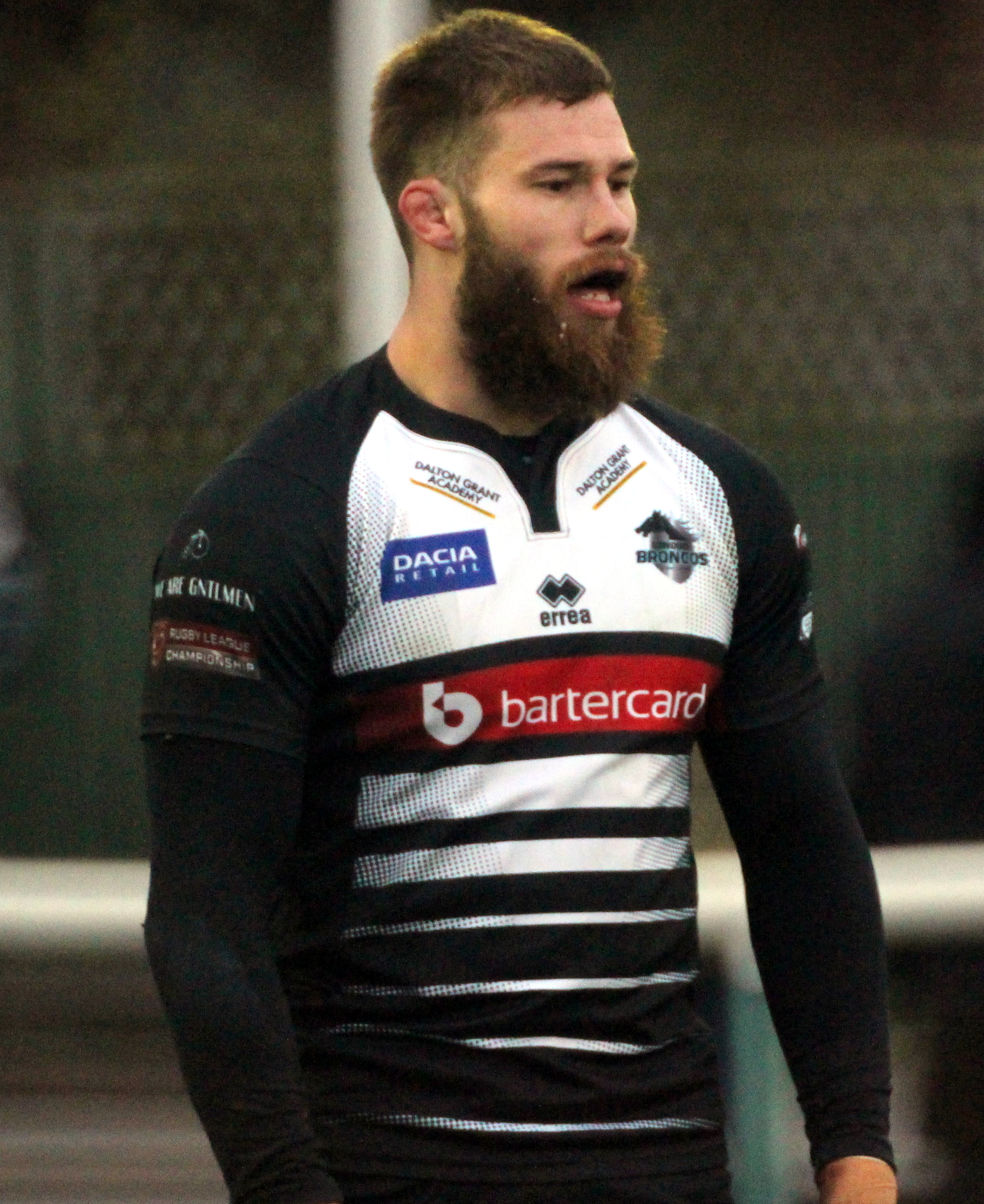

Personal information
- Full name: Thomas Spencer
- Born: 2 January 1991 (age 35) Wigan, Greater Manchester, England
- Height: 6 ft 3 in (1.91 m)
- Weight: 17 st 5 lb (110 kg)

Playing information
- Position: Prop
Club
Years	Team	Pld	T	G	FG	P
2012–13	Wigan Warriors	7	0	0	0	0
2012(DR)	→ Leigh Centurions	17	3	0	0	12
2012(DR)	→ S. Wales Scorpions	2	1	0	0	4
2013(DR)	→ Leigh Centurions	26	3	0	0	12
2014–16	Leigh Centurions	54	7	0	0	28
2016(loan)	→ Oldham	4	0	0	0	0
2017–18	London Broncos	36	3	0	0	12
2019–21	Leigh Centurions	20	2	0	0	8
2021(loan)	→Swinton Lions	4	0	0	0	0
2022	Oldham R.L.F.C.	22	1	0	0	4
2025–	Rochdale Hornets	0	0	0	0	0
	Total	192	20	0	0	80
- Source: As of 14 November 2024
- Relatives: Amy Spencer (sister)

Tom Spencer (born 2 January 1991) is an English former professional rugby league footballer who last played as a prop for Rochdale Hornets in the RFL League 1.

He previously played for the Wigan Warriors in the Super League, and on loan from Wigan at Leigh in the Championship and the South Wales Scorpions in Championship 1. Spencer has also played for the Centurions in the Championship, and on loan from the Leigh Centurions at Oldham in the Championship He also featured for the London Broncos in the Championship.

== Background ==
Spencer was born in Wigan, Greater Manchester, England.

He is the brother of Amy Spencer, a retired English sprinter.

== Career ==
Before joining the Leigh Centurions full-time, Spencer played for the Wigan Warriors. However, he played most of his Wigan Warriors career on dual registration with Leigh Centurions. After playing 96 games for Leigh, Spencer signed for the London Broncos for the 2017 and 2018 seasons.

=== Swinton Lions (loan) ===
On 18 June 2021 he joined Swinton on a short-term two-week loan.

=== Oldham R.L.F.C. ===
On 17 November 2021, it was reported that he had signed for Oldham R.L.F.C. in the RFL Championship

=== Rochdale Hornets ===
On 14 November 2024, it was reported that he had signed for Rochdale in the RFL League 1 on a one-year deal in a retirement u-turn.
