= Michael Channing =

Wales international rugby league footballer

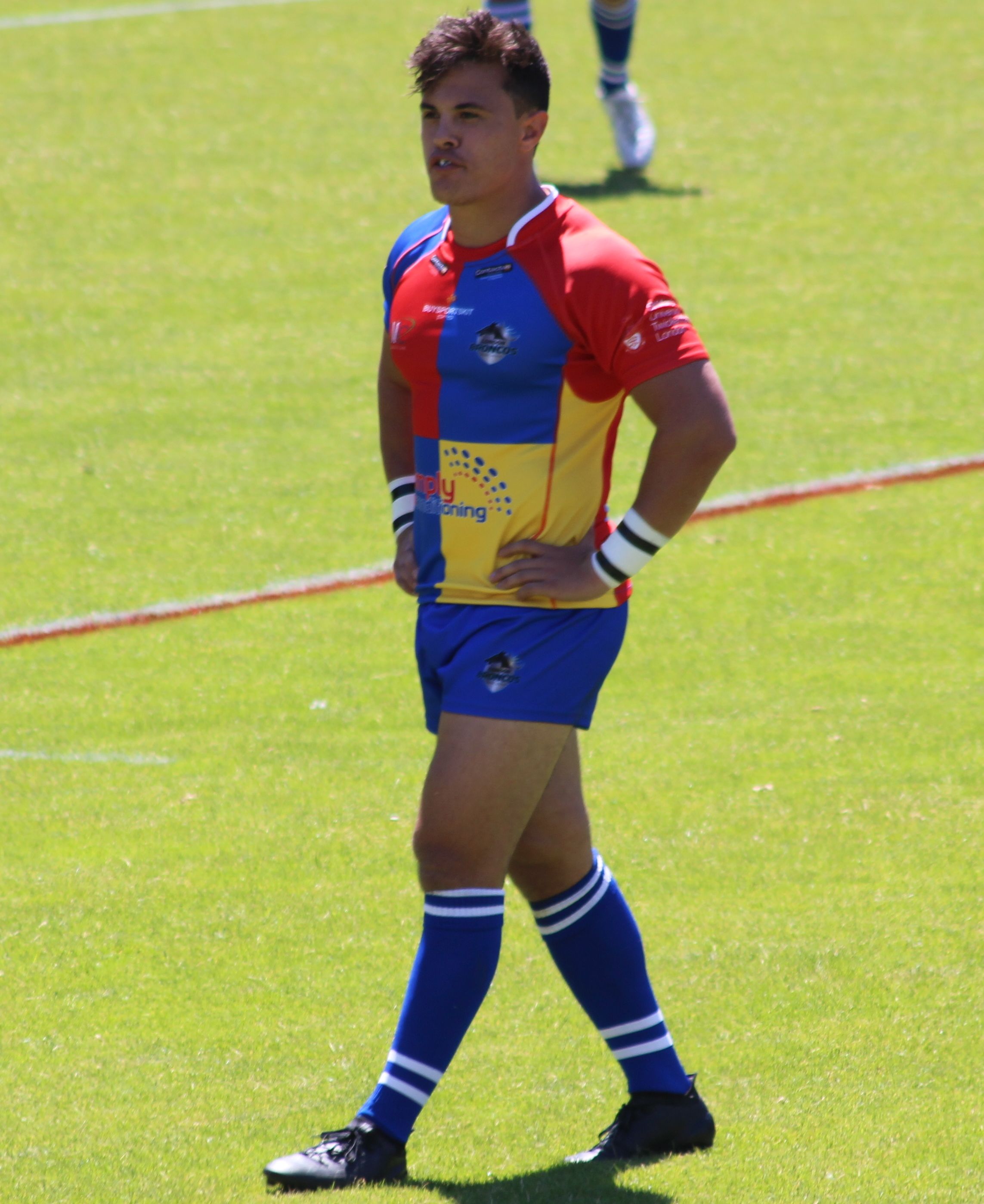

Personal information
- Full name: Michael Channing
- Born: 30 June 1992 (age 32); Guildford, Surrey, England

Playing information
- Height: 5 ft 8 in (1.73 m)
- Weight: 14 st 2 lb (90 kg)
- Position: Centre
Club
| Years | Team | Pld | T | G | FG | P |
|---|---|---|---|---|---|---|
| 2012–13 | London Broncos | 20 | 2 | 0 | 0 | 8 |
| 2013–15 | Castleford Tigers | 28 | 8 | 0 | 0 | 32 |
| 2015(loan) | → York City Knights | 7 | 1 | 0 | 0 | 4 |
| 2016 | Featherstone Rovers | 12 | 2 | 0 | 0 | 8 |
| 2017–18 | London Broncos | 22 | 5 | 1 | 0 | 22 |
| | Total | 89 | 18 | 1 | 0 | 74 |
Representative
| Years | Team | Pld | T | G | FG | P |
| 2012–17 | Wales | 6 | 0 | 0 | 0 | 0 |

Michael Channing (born 30 June 1992) is a former Wales international rugby league footballer who played as a centre for the London Broncos in the Championship.

He previously played for the London Broncos in his first spell at the club, Castleford Tigers in the First:Utility Super League and Featherstone Rovers in the Kingstone Press Championship.

Channing is a Wales international having represented Wales in 6 test matches. His most recent appearances came in the 2015 European Cup tournament after appearing 3 times beforehand in the 2012 Autumn International Series.
