= 2018 Rugby League Qualifiers =

2018 Qualifiers
- Duration: 7 Rounds (Followed by Million Pound Game)
- Teams: 8
- Highest attendance: 11,570; Leeds Rhinos vs Hull KR (1 September 2018)
- Lowest attendance: 696; London Broncos vs Toulouse Olympique (9 September 2018)
- Average attendance: 5,214
- Total attendance: 145,995
- Broadcast partners: (United Kingdom) Sky Sports (United Kingdom) BBC Sport (United Kingdom) SLTV; Fox Sports (Australia) (France) beIN Sport (United States) Fox Soccer Plus (Europe) Sport Klub

2018 season
- Biggest home win: Leeds Rhinos 48-22 Toulouse Olympique (11 August 2018)
- Biggest away win: Halifax 4-62 Salford Red Devils (2 September 2018)
- Top try-scorer: (England) Craig Hall (Hull KR) (12)

Promotion and relegation
- Promoted from Championship: London Broncos
- Relegated to Championship: Widnes Vikings

The 2018 Rugby League Qualifiers is the format used in European rugby league, to determine promotion and relegation between the top two divisions, and forms the second phase of Super League XXIII and the 2018 Rugby League Championship.

Existing Super League sides; Salford Red Devils, Leeds Rhinos and Hull Kingston Rovers reconfirmed their Super League status but Widnes Vikings were relegated to the Championship after only winning one of their seven games. They will be replaced in Super League by London Broncos, who defeated Toronto Wolfpack 4–2 in the Million Pound Game, ending the Broncos four-year exile from Super League.

== Format ==
The Qualifiers sees the bottom four teams from Super League, join the top 4 teams from the Championship. The points totals are reset to zero, and each team plays seven games each, playing every other team once. The teams finishing 1st, 2nd, and 3rd will gain qualification to the Super League XXIV season. The teams finishing 4th and 5th, will play in the "Million Pound Game", at the home of the 4th place team to determine who will take the final place to gain promotion to Super League XXIV. The loser, along with teams finishing 6th, 7th and 8th, will be relegated to the Championship.

== Fixtures and results ==
Each team plays seven fixtures. The teams that finished 9th and 10th in Super League and 1st and 2nd in the Championship each play four home fixtures and three away with the other four teams playing three at home and four away.

== Qualifiers table ==
Pos	Team	Pld	W	D	L	PF	PA	PD	Pts	Qualification
1	Salford Red Devils	7	5	0	2	218	75	+143	10	Super League XXIV
2	Leeds Rhinos	7	5	0	2	216	137	+79	10	Super League XXIV
3	Hull KR	7	5	0	2	197	162	+35	10	Super League XXIV
4	Toronto Wolfpack	7	5	0	2	136	118	+18	10	Million Pound Game
5	London Broncos (P)	7	4	0	3	161	164	−3	8	Million Pound Game
6	Toulouse Olympique	7	3	0	4	156	190	−34	6	2019 Championship
7	Widnes Vikings (R)	7	1	0	6	92	173	−81	2	2019 Championship
8	Halifax	7	0	0	7	68	225	−157	0	2019 Championship

(P) Promoted; (R) Relegated
