= 2018 Rugby League Qualifiers results =

The 2018 Rugby League Qualifiers followed the regular season fixtures of the 2018 Super League and 2018 Championship seasons. The top four teams in the Championship qualified along with the bottom four teams in the Super League. Each team's points totals were reset to zero and each team played against each other once. The top three teams qualified automatically for the Super League in 2019, the fourth and fifth-placed teams contested the "Million Pound Game" at the venue of the fourth-placed team, with the winner also earning a place in the Super League for 2019, while the losing team and the bottom three teams entered the Championship in 2019.

== Qualifiers ==
=== Round 1 ===
Home	Score	Away	Match Information
Home	Score	Away	Date and Time	Venue	Referee	Attendance	Report
Widnes Vikings	20–21	London Broncos	9 August 2018, 19:45	Select Security Stadium	Liam Moore	3,432
Hull KR	10–28	Salford Red Devils	10 August 2018, 20:00	KCOM Craven Park	Robert Hicks	7,081
Leeds Rhinos	48–22	Toulouse Olympique	11 August 2018, 15:15	Headingley Stadium	Gareth Hewer	10,166
Halifax	0–14	Toronto Wolfpack	12 August 2018, 15:00	The MBI Shay	Chris Kendall	1,768

=== Round 2 ===
Home	Score	Away	Match Information
Home	Score	Away	Date and Time	Venue	Referee	Attendance	Report
Salford Red Devils	32–6	Widnes Vikings	18 August 2018, 15:15	AJ Bell Stadium	Ben Thaler	2,317
Toulouse Olympique	28–6	Halifax	18 August 2018, 19:00	Stade Ernest-Argeles	Scott Mikalauskas	1,899
Toronto Wolfpack	22–28	Hull KR	18 August 2018, 19:30	Lamport Stadium	James Child	7,540
London Broncos	32–48	Leeds Rhinos	19 August 2018, 15:00	Trailfinders Sports Ground	Chris Kendall	1,793

=== Round 3 ===
Home	Score	Away	Match Information
Home	Score	Away	Date and Time	Venue	Referee	Attendance	Report
Leeds Rhinos	36–38	Hull KR	1 September 2018, 15:15	Headingley	Ben Thaler	11,570
Toulouse Olympique	42–22	Widnes Vikings	1 September 2018, 17:00	Stade Ernest-Argeles	Robert Hicks	2,911
Toronto Wolfpack	34–22	London Broncos	1 September 2018, 17:30	Lamport Stadium	Scott Mikalauskas	7,557
Halifax	4–62	Salford Red Devils	2 September 2018, 15:00	The MBI Shay	Tom Grant	2,555

=== Round 4 ===
Home	Score	Away	Match Information
Home	Score	Away	Date and Time	Venue	Referee	Attendance	Report
Salford Red Devils	28–16	Toronto Wolfpack	8 September 2018, 15:15	AJ Bell Stadium	Robert Hicks	2,509
Hull KR	38–24	Halifax	9 September 2018, 15:00	KCOM Craven Park	Marcus Griffiths	7,952
London Broncos	34–8	Toulouse Olympique	9 September 2018, 15:00	Trailfinders Sports Ground	Tom Grant	696
Widnes Vikings	6–16	Leeds Rhinos	9 September 2018, 15:00	Select Security Stadium	Chris Kendall	4,050

=== Round 5 ===
Home	Score	Away	Match Information
Home	Score	Away	Date and Time	Venue	Referee	Attendance	Report
Leeds Rhinos	18–16	Salford Red Devils	14 September 2018, 19:45	Headingley	James Child	11,202
Hull KR	30–18	London Broncos	15 September 2018, 15:00	KCOM Craven Park	Greg Dolan	7,210
Toronto Wolfpack	13–12	Toulouse Olympique	15 September 2018, 17:30	Lamport Stadium	Gareth Hewer	7,923
Widnes Vikings	26–12	Halifax	16 September 2018, 15:00	Select Security Stadium	Tom Grant	3,372

=== Round 6 ===
Home	Score	Away	Match Information
Home	Score	Away	Date and Time	Venue	Referee	Attendance	Report
London Broncos	11–8	Salford Red Devils	22 September 2018, 15:00	Trailfinders Sports Ground	Scott Mikalauskas	807
Toulouse Olympique	34–23	Hull KR	22 September 2018, 17:00	Stade Ernest-Argeles	Ben Thaler	4,127
Toronto Wolfpack	20–12	Widnes Vikings	22 September 2018, 17:30	Lamport Stadium	Robert Hicks	8,210
Halifax	6-34	Leeds Rhinos	23 September 2018, 15:00	The MBI Shay	Liam Moore	4,507

=== Round 7 ===
Home	Score	Away	Match Information
Home	Score	Away	Date and Time	Venue	Referee	Attendance	Report
Salford Red Devils	44–10	Toulouse Olympique	27 September 2018, 19:45	AJ Bell Stadium	Ben Thaler	2,115
Leeds Rhinos	16–17	Toronto Wolfpack	28 September 2018, 19:45	Headingley	Robert Hicks	11,565
London Broncos	23-16	Halifax	29 September 2018, 19:05	Trailfinders Sports Ground	Gareth Hewer	869
Hull KR	30-0	Widnes Vikings	30 September 2018, 15:00	KCOM Craven Park	Chris Kendall	8,232

== Million Pound Game ==
7 October 2018
2:00 pm EDT (UTC−04:00)

Toronto Wolfpack	2–4	London Broncos
Goals: O'Brien (1/2)		Goals: Sammut (2/2)

Lamport Stadium, Toronto
Attendance: 9,266
Referee: Chris Kendall
