= Veronica Tawhai =

New Zealand academic

- Born: Veronica Makere Hupane Tawhai; 1980 or 1981 (age 44–45)
- Spouse: James Porter

Academic work
- Institutions: Massey University

Veronica Makere Hupane Tawhai (born 1980 or 1981) is a New Zealand academic and an associate professor at Massey University.

== Early life and education ==
Tawhai was born in 1980 or 1981. She identifies her heritage as Māori, British and Irish. She affiliates with the Māori nations Ngāti Uepohatu and Ngāti Porou. She grew up in Palmerston North and spent time also in Mahora near Ruatorea.

Tawhai has a Bachelor of Arts from Massey University where she majored in social policy and Māori studies. Mason Durie was leading Māori studies at that time. She went on to complete a Master of Education (2007) and a Doctor of Philosophy (2020). Tawhai's PhD included research on 'citizenship education in settler colonial societies'. The title of her doctoral thesis is A red-tipped dawn : teaching and learning about indigeneity and the implications for citizenship education.

Tawhai was the president of the Māori Student Union at university. Tawhai was a founder of Te Ata Kura (Society for Conscientisation), a political education group where mentors included Moana Jackson and Mereana Pitman.

== Career ==
Tawhai started at Massey University as a lecturer in 2008. She is now an associate professor and lectures in policy and politics at Te Pūtahi a Toi and is Pūkenga Tiriti (Tiriti Capability Lead). In the role of Pūkenga Tiriti, Tawhai was appointed in 2022 and is leading a project in the university for new standards in 'Te Tiriti o Waitangi analysis, practice and implementation across all areas of the university'.

Her fields of research include the Treaty of Waitangi, Māori and youth political engagement and constitutional change. Research into the 2020 general election in New Zealand found that Māori voters experienced some negative issues at the polling booths. Tawhai is also a Treaty educator outside of her university work.

Between 2012 and 2017 she was a member of Matike Mai Aotearoa, coordinating the Rangatahi Youth for Constitutional Transformation education project, she authored the Rangatahi: Progress and Findings Report (2014).

In 2024 Tawhai was one of the nine presenters at M9 at the Civic Theatre, Auckland in its 6th instalment, Ka Tohe Au, Ka Tohe Au! I AM THE SOVEREIGN.

Tawhai's book, Weeping Waters: The Treaty of Waitangi and constitutional change, published in 2010, was listed in Books of Mana as one of the 180 most significant works of Māori-authored non-fiction.

== Honours and awards ==
- Fulbright-Nga Pae o Te Maramatanga scholarship award
- Life membership – Te Mana Ākonga (the National Māori Tertiary Students Association)
- Research fellowship – Centre for World Indigenous Studies – The Evergreen State College (Olympia, WA, USA)
- Research fellowship – National Centre for Indigenous Studies, Australian National University (Canberra, Australia).

== Selected works ==
- Co-authored with M. Mulholland Weeping waters: The Treaty of Waitangi and constitutional change, (2010) Wellington, Huia Publishers
- Tawhai, VMH., & Cheyne, CM. (2009). “Like, if it’s really important, they should be saying!” Research with Rangatahi Māori about Local Political Participation.. He Pukenga Kōrero. 9(1), 52–63 [Journal article]
- Tawhai, VMH. (2008). Teaching Diversity, Advancing Democracy: Challenges for Citizenship Education in Aotearoa New Zealand. The International Journal of Diversity in Organisations, Communities and Nations. 8(4), 153–160 [Journal article]
- Warren, KTR., Forster, ME., & Tawhai, V. (2017). Tangata whenua: Māori identity and belonging. In T. Cain, E. Kahu, & RH. Shaw (Eds.) Tūrangawaewae: Identity and belonging in Aotearoa New Zealand. (pp. 53 – 69). 2017: Massey University Press [Chapter]
- Tawhai, VMH. (2016). Indigenous peoples and indigeneity. In The Palgrave International Handbook of Education for Citizenship and Social Justice. (pp. 97 – 119). [Chapter]
- Tawhai, VM.(2014). Matike Mai Aotearoa Rangatahi: Progress and Findings Report June 2014. [Technical Report]
