= Apirana Mahuika =

Māori tribal leader

Chair of Te Rūnanga o Ngāti Porou
- In office 1987–2015

Personal details
- Born: 1 May 1934 Whakawhitira, New Zealand
- Died: 9 February 2015 (aged 80) Gisborne, New Zealand
- Education: Te Aute College; University of Auckland; University of Sydney

Apirana Tuahae Kaukapakapa Mahuika (1 May 1934 – 9 February 2015) was a New Zealand Māori tribal leader. He was chair of Te Rūnanga o Ngāti Porou from its establishment in 1987 until his death in 2015.

== Biography ==
Mahuika was born at Whakawhitira, near Tikitiki, in 1934 to Te Hamana and Tangipo Hemoata Mahuika, and was the youngest of 14 children. Educated at Te Aute College, he gained a Bachelor of Arts from the University of Auckland and a Master of Arts from the University of Sydney. He was ordained as an Anglican minister in 1962.

He taught at a number of institutions, including St Stephen's School at Bombay, The Correspondence School, Wellington College of Education and the University of Waikato, and was awarded an honorary doctorate by the latter establishment in 2004. He was also a member of the council of the University of Waikato. In 1990, Mahuika was awarded the New Zealand 1990 Commemoration Medal. In the 1990s, he was a board member of Te Papa and was instrumental in appointing Cliff Whiting to be joint CEO, or kaihautū, with Cheryll Sotheran.

Mahuika chaired the working party that led to the formation of the Ngāti Porou iwi authority, Te Rūnanga o Ngāti Porou, and he was elected its inaugural chair. He held that post for over 27 years, until his death, and led the iwi through the Treaty of Waitangi settlement process with the Crown.

Before his death, Mahuika was a contributing member as a kaumātua to the Matiki Mai Aotearoa Working Group developing Māori-led constitutional thinking for New Zealand. He died in Gisborne in 2015.
