= Api Pewhairangi =

Ireland international rugby league & union footballer

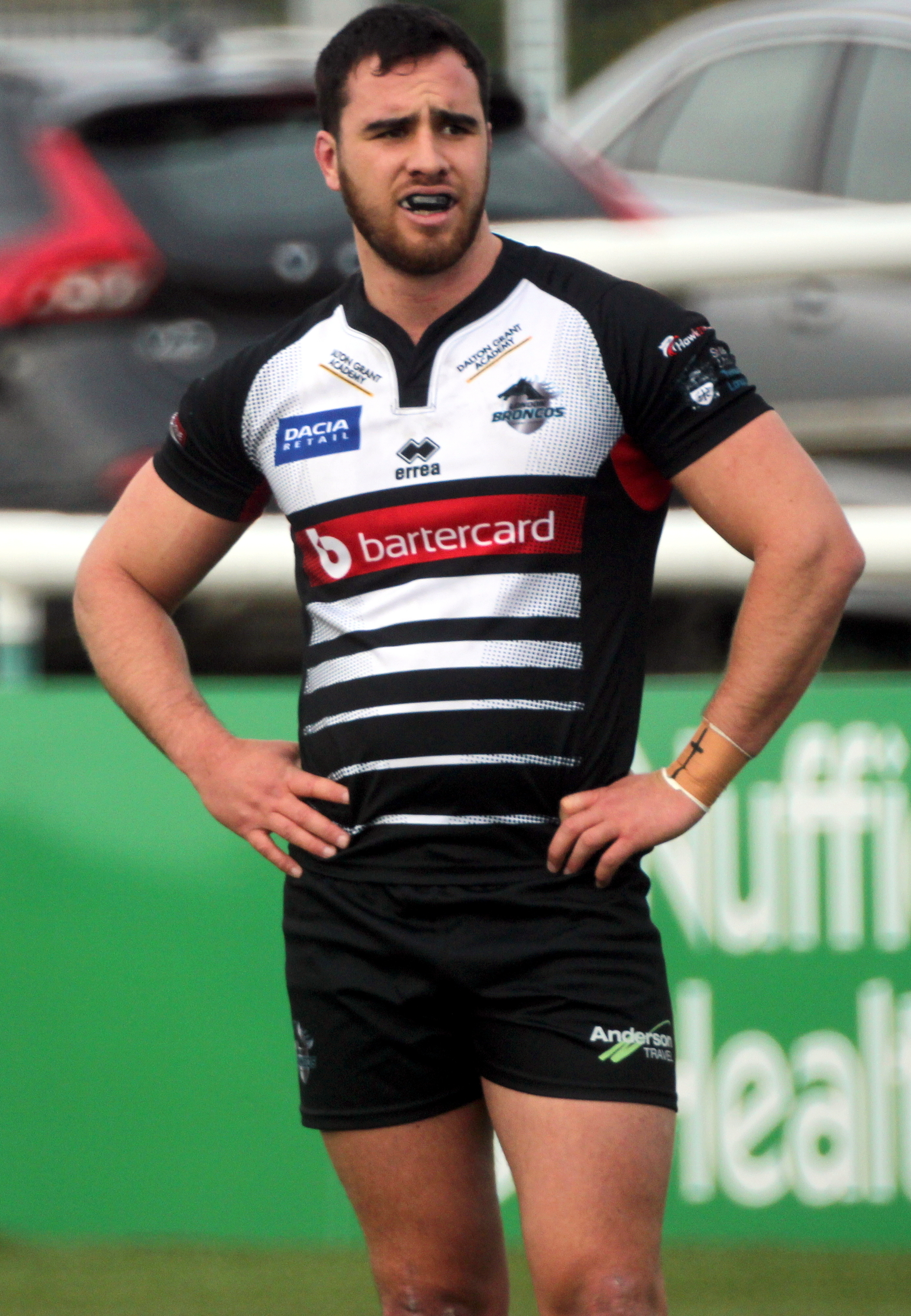

Personal information
- Full name: Apirana Pewhairangi
- Born: 19 March 1992 (age 34) Palmerston North, New Zealand
- Height: 6 ft 1 in (1.85 m)
- Weight: 15 st 2 lb (96 kg)

Playing information

Rugby league
- Position: Stand-off, Loose forward, Centre
Club
Years	Team	Pld	T	G	FG	P
2013	Parramatta Eels	4	1	0	0	4
2016–18	London Broncos	51	35	38	0	216
2018(loan)	→ London Skolars	1	0	0	0	0
2021–23	Te Atatu Roosters	32	10	79	0	198
2025–2026	Mt Albert Lions	2	4	0	0	16
	Total	90	50	117	0	434
Representative
Years	Team	Pld	T	G	FG	P
2013–17	Ireland	5	1	0	0	4

Rugby union
Club
Years	Team	Pld	T	G	FG	P
2015–16	Connacht	2	2			10
2022–23	Ngati Porou East Coast	4	1			5
	Total	6	3	0	0	15
- Source: As of 5 August 2023

Apirana Pewhairangi (born 19 March 1992) is an Ireland international rugby league footballer who last played as a five-eighth or centre for the Te Atatu Roosters in the Auckland Rugby League. He previously played for the Parramatta Eels in the NRL, the Wentworthville Magpies and New Zealand Warriors in the NSW Cup, and the London Broncos in the Championship.

He represented Ireland in the 2013 Rugby League World Cup. He briefly played rugby union signing for Irish provincial rugby union side Connacht in the Pro12. In union, he was registered with Connacht as a centre.

== Early life ==
Pewhairangi was born in Palmerston North, New Zealand. He is of Māori, and Irish descent. Growing up, Pewhairangi played junior rugby league for the Te Aroha Eels.

== Rugby league career ==
=== Newcastle Knights (2009–2012) ===
Pewhairangi was signed by the Newcastle Knights in 2009. He played for the Knights' NYC team from 2010 to 2012, captaining the side in 2012. However Pewhairangi did not break into the first-grade side during his time with the Knights.

=== Parramatta Eels (2013–2014) ===
In 2013, Pewhairangi moved to the Parramatta Eels, and played for the Wentworthville Magpies in the NSW Cup. In round 9 of the 2013 NRL season, he made his National Rugby League début for Parramatta against the Brisbane Broncos. Pewhairangi played four games with Parramatta in 2013 as they finished with the Wooden Spoon for a second consecutive season.

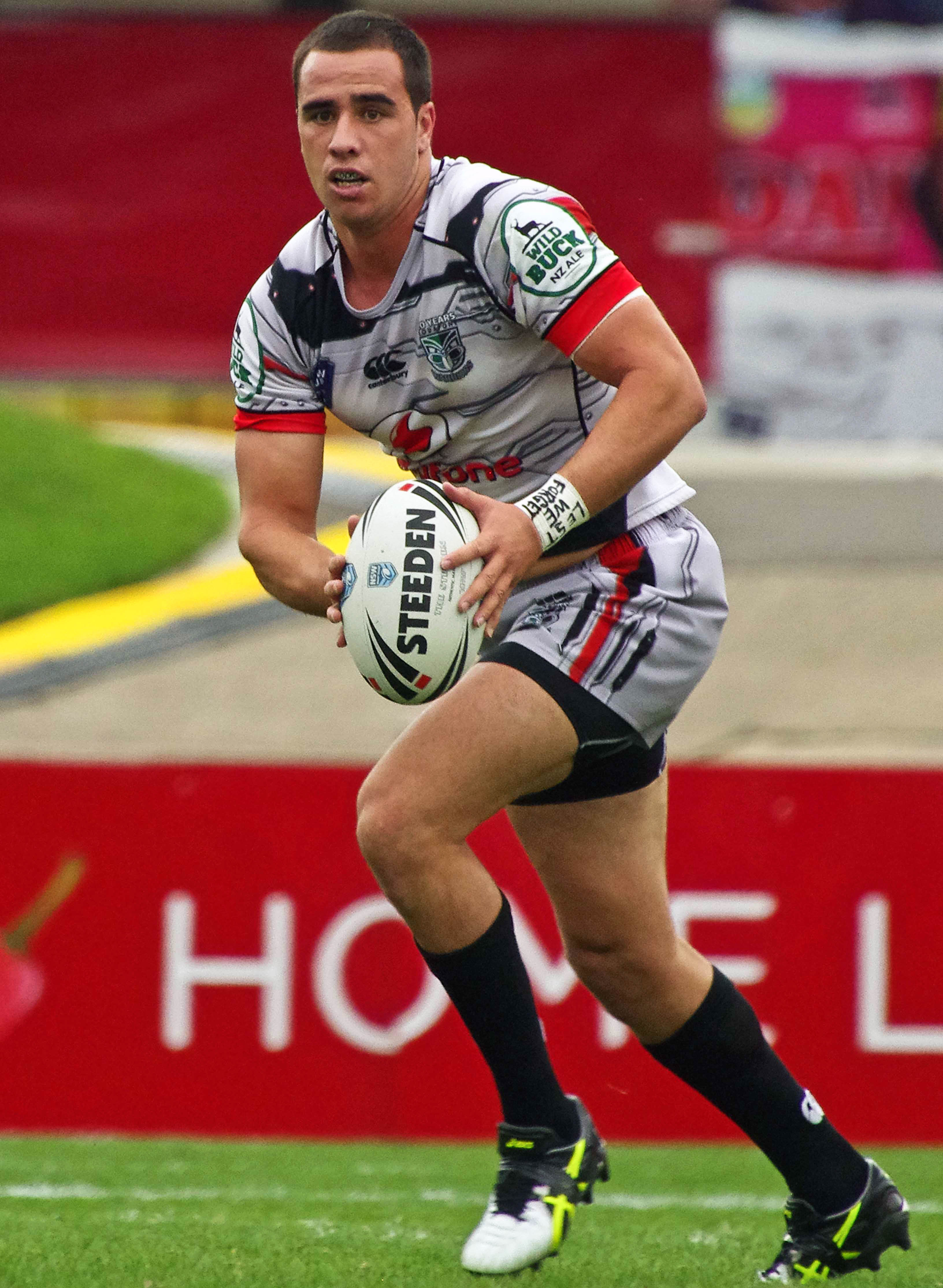
Pewhairangi in action for the New Zealand Warriors

=== New Zealand Warriors (2015) ===
On 27 November 2014, after attending an open trial for their NSW Cup side, Pewhairangi signed with the New Zealand Warriors for the 2015 season.

=== London Broncos (2016–2018) ===
On 12 May 2016, Kingstone Press Championship team London Broncos offered Pewairangi a 4-week trial at the club. He made his début in London's 62–4 home victory over Whitehaven, scoring 2 tries. After the game, the Broncos announced that they had signed Pewhairangi on a contract until the end of the 2017 season. In October 2017, having played 33 games for the London Broncos, and scored 22 tries, Pewhairangi signed a one-year contract extension, taking him to the end of the 2018 season.

=== New Zealand Warriors (2019–) ===
Pewhairangi rejoined the New Zealand Warriors for 2019, playing in the NRL trials match in February 2019 against the Melbourne Storm. He played in their Canterbury Cup side as a half.

=== Te Atatu Roosters (2021-24) ===
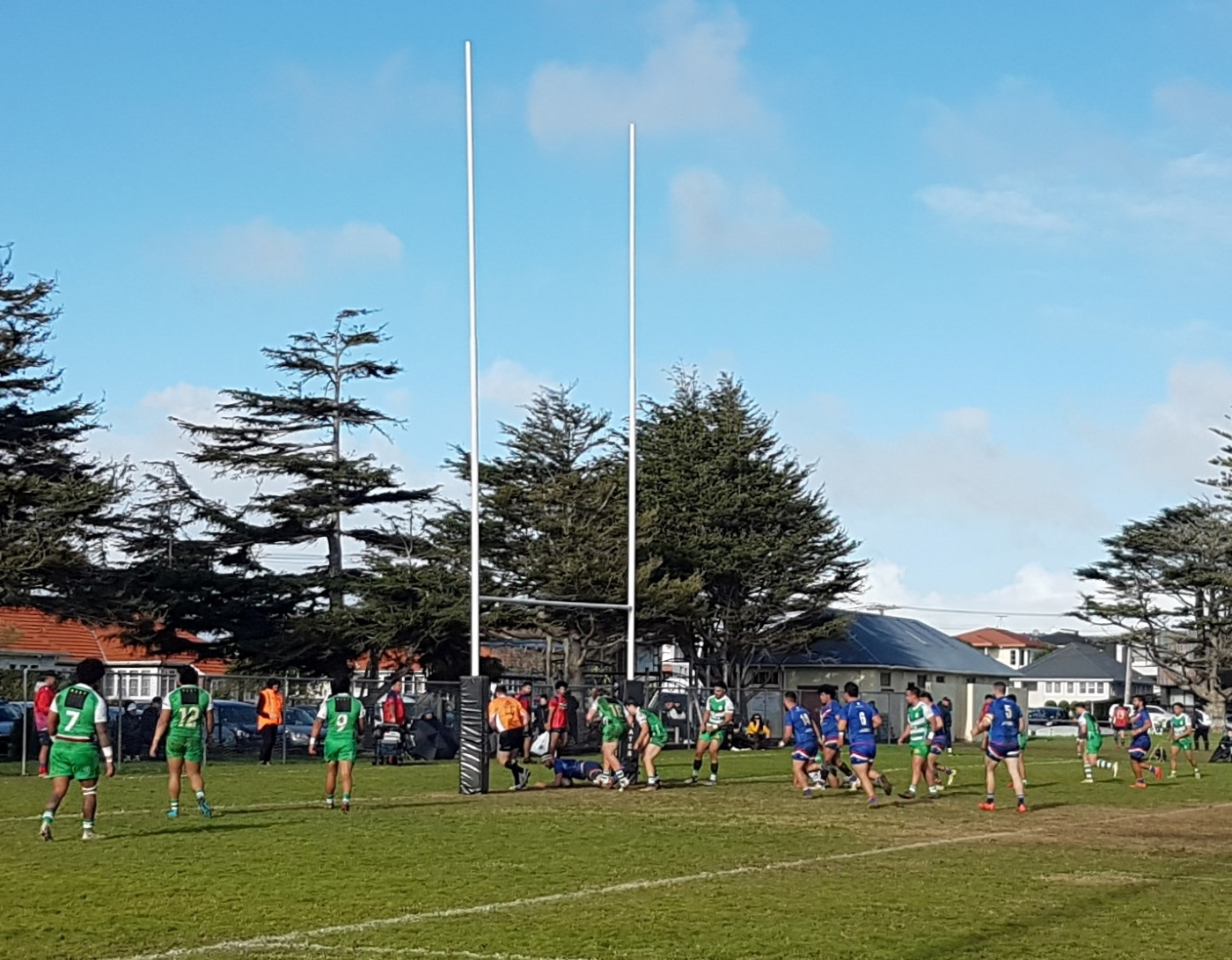
Scoring a try for Te Atatū against Pt Chevalier on July 1, 2023

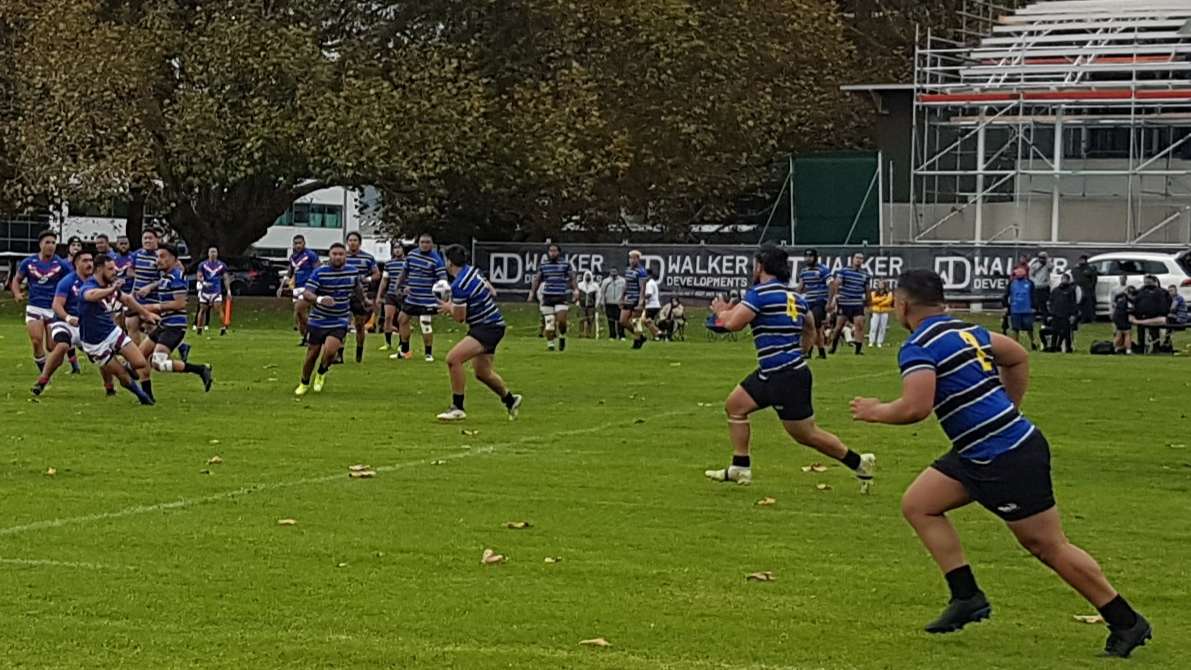
Pewhairangi on defence, playing for Te Atatū v Ponsonby at Victoria Park.

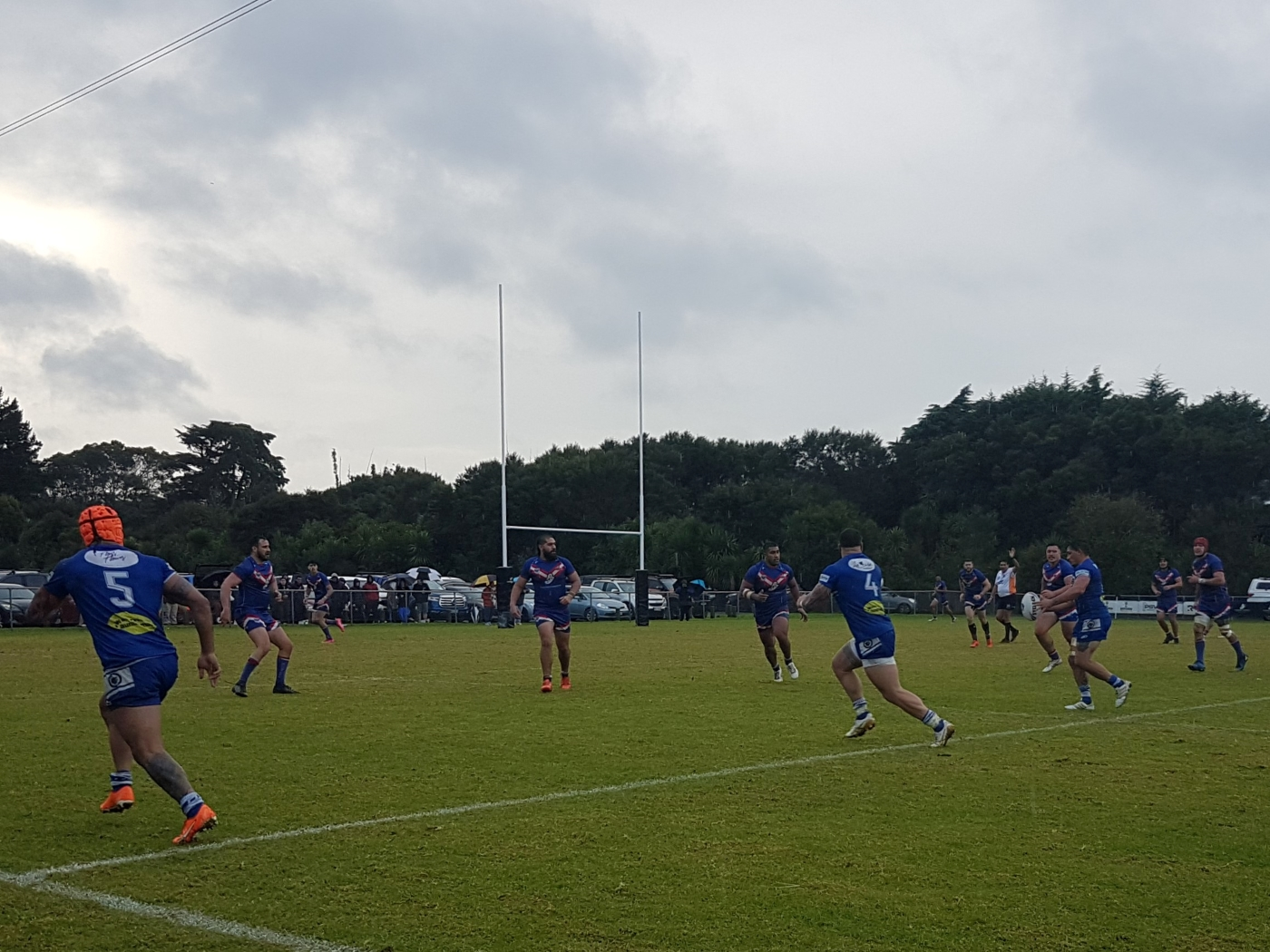
Api Pewhairangi defending for Te Atatū.

In 2021, he joined the Te Atatū Roosters as captain and has continued in this role through to the 2023 season. He has taken on the goal kicking duties following on from Scott Jones, the former Warriors junior player.

=== Mt Albert Lions (2025) ===
In 2025, Pewhairangi joined the Mt Albert Lions to continue his rugby league career in the Auckland Rugby League competition. In a grading round game on April 26, he scored two tries in a 42-6 over Hibiscus Coast Raiders.

=== Representative ===
In 2011, Pewhairangi represented the New Zealand Māori Residents in a match against the New Zealand Residents. In 2012, he was selected for the Junior Kiwis.

Pewhairangi qualified to play for Ireland through his grandmother from Lucan. Despite not having been capped before and not playing for the team at under-age level, Pewhairangi was named in the Irish squad for the 2013 World Cup. He played in two of Ireland's tournament games.

== Rugby union career ==
In June 2015, it was announced that Pewhairangi would switch codes, joining Irish rugby union side Connacht. Pewhairangi trained with the squad in the 2015–16 preseason and featured in friendly matches against Grenoble and Castres. However he suffered an anterior cruciate ligament injury in the Castres game.

=== Ngati Porou East Coast ===
In 2022 at the conclusion of the rugby league season, Pewhairangi moved to the East Coast and played 4 matches for Ngati Porou East Coast in the Heartland championship including the Lochore Cup final win over Mid Canterbury 25–20.
