= 2018 RFL Championship =

Rugby league football competition played primarily in the United Kingdom

- League: Championship
- Duration: 23 rounds (followed by a league split into Super 8s for 7 more fixtures)
- Teams: 12
- Highest attendance: 38,881 Toronto Wolfpack vs Toulouse Olympique (19 May)
- Lowest attendance: 312 Rochdale Hornets vs London Broncos (13 April)
- Broadcast partners: Sky Sports and Premier Sports for Toronto Games

2018 season
- Biggest home win: Featherstone Rovers 80–4 Rochdale Hornets (1 July)
- Biggest away win: Barrow Raiders 6–72 Toulouse Olympique (15 July); Barrow Raiders 6–72 London Broncos (29 July)

The 2018 Rugby Football League Championship is a rugby league football competition played primarily in the United Kingdom, one tier below the first tier Super League. The 2018 season is the fourth to consist of the Super 8s structure combining the Championship and Super League three-quarters of the way through the season.

The 2018 Championship features 12 teams, which all play one another twice in the regular season, once at home, and once away, totalling 22 games. The 2018 season also features the "Summer Bash Weekend" for a fourth time. This is a 23rd round of fixtures which replicates Super League's Magic Weekend concept for the Championship sides. After these 23 rounds in both the Championship and the Super League, the two divisions of twelve are split into three divisions of eight, the "Super 8s".

New sponsors for the league were announced in January 2018, and the league will be known as the Betfred Championship until the end of 2019. The bookmakers, Betfred, extended their sponsorship of rugby league to include the Championship and League 1 as well as Super League.

== Teams ==
This year's competition features 12 teams. The teams consist of nine of the 12 teams from 2017, the champions of the 2017 League One season, the Toronto Wolfpack, and the champion of the League One playoffs, Barrow Raiders. Bradford Bulls and Oldham, the two bottom placed teams in the 2017 season, were relegated to League One, while Hull Kingston Rovers were promoted back to Super League after just one season in the Championship.

Locations of the 2018 RFL Championship teams
Locations of 2018 RFL Championship teams
Locations of 2018 RFL Championship teams
Locations of the 2018 RFL Championship teams in West Yorkshire

Legend
Championship Shield holders
Promoted from League 1
Relegated from Super League

Team and current season	Stadium	Capacity	Location
Barrow Raiders	The JF Hornby Stadium	7,600	Barrow-in-Furness, Cumbria
Batley Bulldogs	Fox's Biscuits Stadium	7,500	Batley, West Yorkshire
Dewsbury Rams	Tetley's Stadium	5,800	Dewsbury, West Yorkshire
Featherstone Rovers	LD Nutrition Stadium	8,000	Featherstone, West Yorkshire
Halifax	The MBi Shay	14,000	Halifax, West Yorkshire
Leigh Centurions	Leigh Sports Village	12,000	Leigh, Greater Manchester
London Broncos	Trailfinders Sports Ground	3,020	Ealing, London
Rochdale Hornets	Crown Oil Arena	10,249	Rochdale, Greater Manchester
Sheffield Eagles	Sheffield Olympic Legacy Stadium	2,500	Sheffield, South Yorkshire
Swinton Lions	Heywood Road	3,387	Sale, Greater Manchester
Toronto Wolfpack	Lamport Stadium	9,600	Toronto, Canada
Toulouse Olympique	Stade Ernest-Argelès	4,000	Toulouse, France

== Final standings ==
Pos	Team	Pld	W	D	L	PF	PA	PD	Pts	Qualification
1	Toronto Wolfpack	23	20	1	2	866	374	+492	41	The Qualifiers
2	London Broncos	23	16	1	6	907	423	+484	33	The Qualifiers
3	Toulouse Olympique	23	16	1	6	900	438	+462	33	The Qualifiers
4	Halifax	23	16	1	6	643	416	+227	33	The Qualifiers
5	Featherstone Rovers	23	16	0	7	819	420	+399	32	Championship Shield
6	Leigh Centurions	23	16	0	7	849	508	+341	32	Championship Shield
7	Batley Bulldogs	23	8	0	15	523	703	−180	16	Championship Shield
8	Sheffield Eagles	23	7	0	16	437	843	−406	14	Championship Shield
9	Dewsbury Rams	23	6	1	16	424	746	−322	13	Championship Shield
10	Barrow Raiders	23	5	3	15	382	816	−434	13	Championship Shield
11	Swinton Lions	23	3	2	18	402	866	−464	8	Championship Shield
12	Rochdale Hornets	23	4	0	19	327	926	−599	8	Championship Shield

== The Qualifiers ==
Toronto, London, Toulouse and Halifax played in the 2018 Qualifiers together with Super League sides Leeds, Hull Kingston Rovers, Salford and Widnes. With points reset to zero, after each side played each other once the top three teams qualified for Super League XXIV in 2019. The teams finishing fourth and fifth played each other in the Million Pound Game with the winner also qualifying for Super League XXIV. The losers of the Million Pound Game together with the teams finishing sixth, seventh and eighth in the Qualifiers played in the 2019 Rugby League Championship.

=== Standings ===
Pos	Team	Pld	W	D	L	PF	PA	PD	Pts	Qualification
1	Salford Red Devils	7	5	0	2	218	75	+143	10	Super League XXIV
2	Leeds Rhinos	7	5	0	2	216	137	+79	10	Super League XXIV
3	Hull KR	7	5	0	2	197	162	+35	10	Super League XXIV
4	Toronto Wolfpack	7	5	0	2	136	118	+18	10	Million Pound Game
5	London Broncos (P)	7	4	0	3	161	164	−3	8	Million Pound Game
6	Toulouse Olympique	7	3	0	4	156	190	−34	6	2019 Championship
7	Widnes Vikings (R)	7	1	0	6	92	173	−81	2	2019 Championship
8	Halifax	7	0	0	7	68	225	−157	0	2019 Championship

(P) Promoted; (R) Relegated

== Championship Shield ==
The clubs finishing fifth and below in the regular season play for the Championship Shield. Points earned during the regular season are carried forward and after seven more games the top two clubs play in the shield final. Prior to the start of the season it was announced that the two clubs at the bottom of the table will be relegated to the League 1 for 2019, however following an emergency general meeting of the RFL on 13 September 2018 the Championship and League 1 clubs agreed that for 2019 the number of clubs in the Championship would be increased from 12 to 14. To achieve this the team finishing 11th will not be relegated and the team finishing bottom will play-off against the League 1 team that loses the League 1 promotion final (Note: The winning team in the League 1 promotion final will automatically be promoted to the Championship) to decide which team will play in the Championship for 2019.

=== Standings ===
Pos	Team	Pld	W	D	L	PF	PA	PD	Pts	Qualification
1	Featherstone Rovers (Q)	30	23	0	7	1040	524	+516	46	Shield final
2	Leigh Centurions (Q)	30	20	0	10	1059	644	+415	40	Shield final
3	Batley Bulldogs	30	14	0	16	753	805	−52	28	
4	Dewsbury Rams	30	10	1	19	650	899	−249	21	
5	Barrow Raiders	30	8	3	19	491	1006	−515	19	
6	Sheffield Eagles	30	8	0	22	549	1091	−542	16	
7	Rochdale Hornets	30	6	0	24	465	1093	−628	12	
8	Swinton Lions	30	4	2	24	502	1112	−610	10	Relegation play-off (Note: The relegation play-off is a single-leg play-off between the team finishing last in the Championship Shield and the team that loses the League 1 Promotional Final)

Updated to match(es) played on 14 September 2018. Source:
(Q) Qualified for the phase indicated
