= 2017 London Broncos season =

- 2017 Championship Rank: 2nd
- Play-off result: N/A
- Challenge Cup: Fourth Round
- 2017 record: Wins: 19; draws: 1; losses: 9
- Points scored: For: 950; against: 533

Team information
- Chairman: David Hughes
- Head Coach: Andrew Henderson
- Captain: Daniel Harrison
- Stadium: Trailfinders Sports Ground
- Avg. attendance: 860
- High attendance: 1476

Top scorers
- Tries: Jarrod Sammut - 26
- Goals: Jarrod Sammut - 84
- Points: Jarrod Sammut - 272
Home colours	Away colours
← 2016	List of seasons	2018 →

The 2017 London Broncos season was the thirty-eighth in the club's history and their third consecutive season out of the Super League. Competing in the 2017 Kingstone Press Championship, the club was coached by Andrew Henderson, finishing in 2nd place and reaching the Fourth Round of the 2017 Challenge Cup. They failed to achieve promotion after finishing 6th place in the 2017 Super League Qualifiers.

It was their second since moving to Ealing. They exited the Challenge Cup with a defeat by the Toronto Wolfpack.

== 2017 squad ==
London Broncos 2017 Squad
First team squad			Coaching staff
1 (Wales) Elliot Kear – FB, CE, WG; 2 (Wales) Rhys Williams – WG; 3 (Scotland) Ben Hellewell – CE, SR; 4 (Australia) Adrian Purtell – CE; 5 (England) Kieran Dixon – WG; 6 (Malta) Jarrod Sammut – SO, SH; 7 (France) William Barthau – SH, SO; 8 (England) Tom Spencer – PR; 9 (England) James Cunningham (vc) – HK; 10 (New Zealand) Mark Ioane – PR, SR; 11 (Australia) Daniel Harrison (c) – SR; 12 (England) Matt Garside – SR, CE; 13 (England) Jay Pitts – LF, SR	14 (England) Andy Ackers – HK; 15 (England) Eddie Battye – PR; 16 (Fiji) Junior Roqica – PR, LF; 17 (United States) Mark Offerdahl – PR, LF; 18 (Wales) Ben Evans – PR; 19 (Ireland) Api Pewhairangi – SO, HK; 20 (Wales) Michael Channing – CE; 21 (Wales) Dalton Grant – WG; 22 (England) Matt Davis – SR, LF; 23 (England) Matty Gee – SR; 24 (Scotland) Alex Walker – FB; 25 (England) Will Lovell – SR; 26 (Australia) Alex Mammone – PR	27 (England) Ben Pointer – HK; 28 (England) Sadiq Adebiyi – PR, SR; 29 (England) Kameron Pearce-Paul – WG, CE; 30 (England) Callum Bustin – CE, SR; 31 (England) Lewis Bienek – PR; 33 (England) Lewis Foster – SH, HK; 34 (France) John Boudebza – HK; 35 (England) Jacob Ogden – CE; 36 (England) Sam Wilde – SR, LF	Head coach: (Scotland) Andrew Henderson; Assistant coaches: (England) Jamie Langley; (England) Danny Ward; Legend: (c) Captain(s); (vc) Vice-captain(s); Injured; Updated: 7 July 2017; Source(s): London Broncos squad 2017

== 2017 tables ==
=== Regular season ===
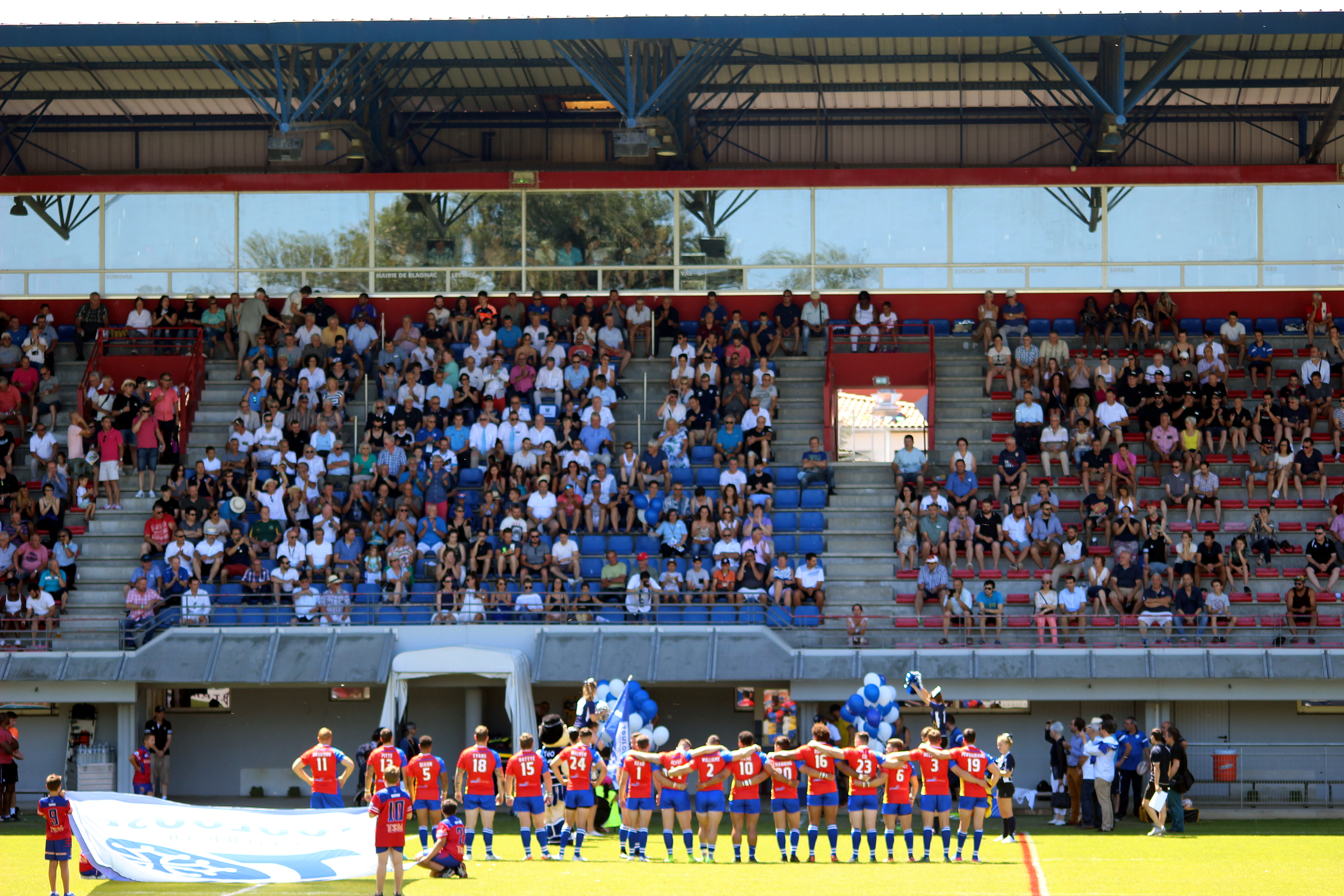
London Broncos lining up away at Toulouse in 2017

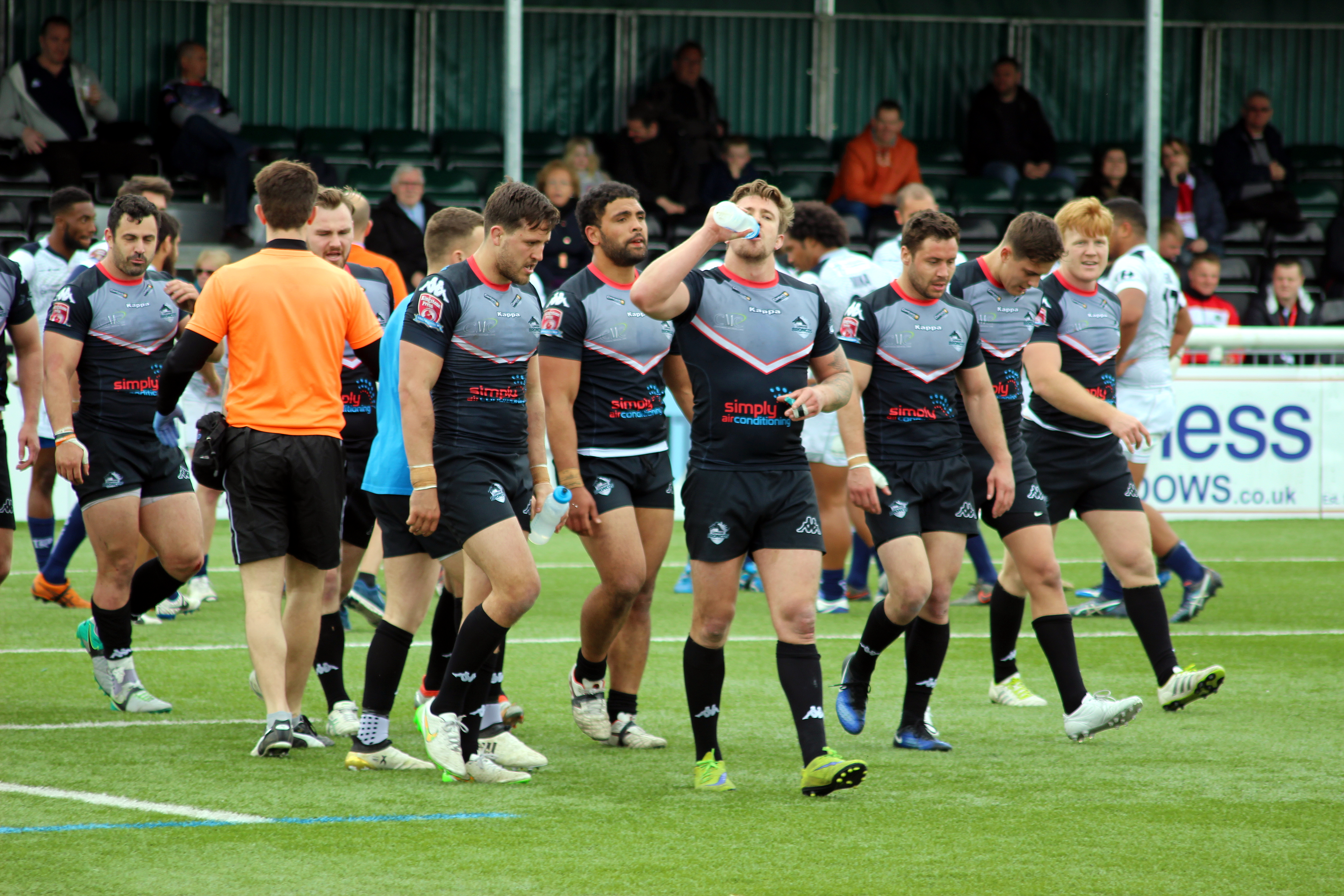
London Broncos after scoring a try in April 2017

Pos	Team	Pld	W	D	L	PF	PA	PD	Pts	Qualification
1	Hull Kingston Rovers (X)	23	19	1	3	850	385	+465	39	The Qualifiers
2	London Broncos	23	18	0	5	832	410	+422	36	The Qualifiers
3	Halifax	23	16	0	7	567	357	+210	32	The Qualifiers
4	Featherstone Rovers	23	15	1	7	687	421	+266	31	The Qualifiers
5	Toulouse Olympique	23	15	0	8	720	466	+254	30	Championship Shield
6	Batley Bulldogs	23	11	0	12	549	663	−114	22	Championship Shield
7	Sheffield Eagles	23	10	0	13	568	785	−217	20	Championship Shield
8	Dewsbury Rams	23	8	0	15	388	736	−348	16	Championship Shield
9	Rochdale Hornets	23	7	1	15	457	680	−223	15	Championship Shield
10	Swinton Lions	23	6	0	17	477	648	−171	12	Championship Shield
11	Oldham	23	5	1	17	410	735	−325	11	Championship Shield
12	Bradford Bulls (Note: Bradford Bulls deducted 12 points on 3 January 2017 for entering administration.)	23	6	0	17	500	719	−219	0	Championship Shield

(X) League Leaders Shield

=== Qualifiers ===
Pos	Team	Pld	W	D	L	PF	PA	PD	Pts	Qualification
1	Warrington Wolves	7	7	0	0	288	138	+150	14	Super League XXIII
2	Widnes Vikings	7	5	0	2	188	96	+92	10	Super League XXIII
3	Hull Kingston Rovers (P)	7	5	0	2	166	158	+8	10	Super League XXIII
4	Leigh Centurions (R)	7	4	0	3	203	104	+99	8	Million Pound Game
5	Catalans Dragons	7	4	0	3	130	143	−13	8	Million Pound Game
6	London Broncos	7	1	1	5	174	220	−46	3	2018 Championship
7	Featherstone Rovers	7	1	1	5	110	272	−162	3	2018 Championship
8	Halifax	7	0	0	7	82	210	−128	0	2018 Championship

(P) Promoted to Super League; (R) Relegated

== 2017 fixtures and results ==
2017 RFL Championship

== 2017 Transfers ==
Gains

Gains
Player	Previous club	Years signed	Date Announced
(England) Tom Spencer	Leigh Centurions	2 Years	July 2016
(Wales) Dalton Grant	Dewsbury Rams	2 Years	July 2016
(Australia) Adrian Purtell	Bradford Bulls	2 Years	August 2016
(England) Jay Pitts	Bradford Bulls	2 Years	August 2016
(Wales) Michael Channing	Featherstone Rovers	2 Years	September 2016
(Wales) Ben Evans	Warrington Wolves	1 Year	October 2016
(Malta) Jarrod Sammut	Workington Town	2 Years	October 2016
(England) Matty Gee	Salford Red Devils	1 Year	November 2016
(England) Kieran Dixon	Hull Kingston Rovers	2 Years	November 2016
(Fiji) Junior Roqica	Cronulla Sharks	1 Year	November 2016
(England) Lewis Foster	Leigh Centurions	loan	March 2017
(France) John Boudebza	Lézignan Sangliers	end of 2017	July 2017
(England) Sam Wilde	Warrington Wolves	loan	July 2017

Losses

Losses
Player	Signed for	Contract	Date Announced
(Malta) Jon Magrin	Bradford Bulls	2 Years	August 2016
(England) Iliess Macani	Bradford Bulls	2 Years	August 2016
(England) Alex Foster	Bradford Bulls	2 Years	August 2016
(England) Jack Bussey	Toronto Wolfpack	1 Year	September 2016
(Fiji) Wes Naiqama	Retirement	N/A	September 2016
(England) Ben Gray	Released	N/A	September 2016
(England) Scott Leatherbarrow	Oldham R.L.F.C.	2 Years	September 2016
(Australia) Jamie Soward	Australia	N/A	September 2016
(England) Tuoyo Egodo	Castleford Tigers	2 Years	October 2016
(England) Toby Everett	Toronto Wolfpack	1 Year Loan	October 2016
(Papua New Guinea) Israel Eliab	PNG Hunters	2 Years	November 2016
(England) Jamie Thackray	Doncaster	1 Year	November 2016
(Australia) Alex Mammone	Halifax	1 Year	February 2017
(England) Will Lovell	Released		February 2017
(England) Lewis Foster	Rochdale Hornets	end of loan	June 2017
(England) Toby Everett	Dewsbury Rams		June 2017

== Squad statistics ==
Squad Number	Name	International country	Position	Previous club	Appearances	Tries	Goals	Drop Goals	Points	Notes
1	Elliot Kear	(Wales)	Fullback, Wing, Centre	Bradford Bulls	29	11	0	0	44	
2	Rhys Williams	(Wales)	Wing	Central Queensland Capras	31	15	0	0	60	
3	Ben Hellewell	(Scotland)	Centre	Featherstone Rovers	25	8	0	0	32	
4	Adrian Purtell	(Australia)	Centre	Bradford Bulls	10	2	0	0	8	
5	Kieran Dixon	(England)	Wing	Hull Kingston Rovers	21	19	45	0	166	
6	Jarrod Sammut	(Malta)	Stand-off	Workington Town	28	25	84	0	268	
7	William Barthau	(France)	Scrum-half	Catalans Dragons	26	12	0	0	48	
8	Tom Spencer	(England)	Prop	Leigh Centurions	9	0	0	0	0	
9	James Cunningham	(England)	Hooker	Hull F.C.	14	5	0	0	20	
10	Mark Ioane	(New Zealand)	Prop	St. George Illawarra Dragons	27	8	0	0	32	
11	Daniel Harrison	(Australia)	Second-row	Manly Warringah Sea Eagles	21	9	0	0	36	
12	Matt Garside	(England)	Second-row	Sheffield Eagles	18	5	0	0	20	
13	Jay Pitts	(England)	Loose forward	Bradford Bulls	31	9	0	0	36	
14	Andy Ackers	(England)	Hooker	Swinton Lions	20	12	0	0	48	
15	Eddie Battye	(England)	Prop	Sheffield Eagles	14	0	0	0	0	
16	Junior Roqica	(Fiji)	Prop	Cronulla Sharks	20	5	0	0	20	
17	Mark Offerdahl	(United States)	Prop	Connecticut Wildcats	17	0	0	0	0	
18	Ben Evans	(Wales)	Prop	Warrington Wolves	25	2	0	0	8	
19	Api Pewhairangi	(Republic of Ireland)	Stand-off	Parramatta Eels	21	13	15	0	82	
20	Michael Channing	(Wales)	Centre	Featherstone Rovers	13	3	0	0	12	
21	Dalton Grant	(Wales)	Wing	Dewsbury Rams	0	0	0	0	0	
22	Matt Davis	(England)	Loose forward	London Broncos Academy	16	3	0	0	12	
23	Matty Gee	(England)	Second-row	Salford Red Devils	25	3	0	0	12	
24	Alex Walker	(Scotland)	Fullback	London Broncos Academy	25	13	0	0	52	
25	Will Lovell	(England)	Second-row	London Skolars	0	0	0	0	0	
26	Alex Mammone	(Australia)	Prop	Asquith Magpies	0	0	0	0	0	
27	Ben Pointer	(England)	Hooker	London Broncos Academy	4	0	0	0	0	
28	Sadiq Adebiyi	(Nigeria)	Second-row	London Broncos Academy	5	0	0	0	0	
29	Kameron Pearce-Paul	(England)	Centre	London Broncos Academy	3	1	0	0	4	
30	Callum Bustin	(England)	Centre	London Broncos Academy	1	0	0	0	0	
31	Lewis Bienek	(Republic of Ireland)	Prop	London Broncos Academy	13	3	0	0	12	
32	Toby Everett	(England)	Prop	London Broncos Academy	0	0	0	0	0	
33	Lewis Foster	(England)	Hooker	Leigh Centurions	6	0	0	0	0	loan
34	John Boudebza	(France)	Hooker	Lézignan Sangliers	5	0	0	0	0	
35	Jacob Ogden	(Jamaica)	Centre	London Broncos Academy	4	0	0	0	0	
36	Sam Wilde	(England)	Second-row	Warrington Wolves	4	0	0	0	0	loan
