= 2016 London Broncos season =

37th season

- 2016 Championship Rank: 2nd
- Play-off result: 6th in Qualifiers
- Challenge Cup: Fourth Round
- 2016 record: Wins: 20; draws: 0; losses: 11
- Points scored: For: 949; against: 704

Team information
- Chairman: David Hughes
- Head Coach: Andrew Henderson
- Captain: Wes Naiqama
- Stadium: Trailfinders Sports Ground

Top scorers
- Tries: Rhys Williams - 29
- Goals: Wes Naiqama - 49
- Points: Rhys Williams - 116
Home colours	Away colours
← 2015	List of seasons	2017 →

The 2016 London Broncos season was the thirty-seventh in the club's history and their second consecutive season out of the Super League. Competing in the 2016 Kingstone Press Championship, the club was coached by Andrew Henderson, finishing in 2nd place and reaching the Fourth Round of the 2016 Challenge Cup. They failed to achieve promotion after finishing 6th place in the 2016 Super League Qualifiers.

It was their first season at the Ealing Trailfinders Sports Ground. They exited the Challenge Cup with a defeat by Featherstone Rovers.

== 2016 squad ==
London Broncos 2016 squad
First team squad			Coaching staff
1 (Scotland) Ben Hellewell – CE, FB; 2 (Wales) Rhys Williams – WG; 3 (Australia) Nathan Stapleton – CE, FB; 4 (Fiji) Wes Naiqama (c) – CE; 5 (England) Iliess Macani – WG, FB; 6 (Papua New Guinea) Israel Eliab – SO, CE; 7 (France) William Barthau – SH, SO; 8 (Australia) Nick Slyney (vc) – PR, LF; 9 (England) James Cunningham – HK; 10 (England) Eddie Battye – PR; 11 (Australia) Daniel Harrison – SR; 12 (England) Matt Garside – SR, CE; 13 (Scotland) Rhys Lovegrove – LF, SR	14 (England) Andy Ackers – HK; 15 (England) Jack Bussey – LF, SO, SR; 16 (New Zealand) Mark Ioane – PR, SR; 17 (United States) Mark Offerdahl – PR, LF; 18 (England) Jamie Thackray – PR; 19 (Ireland) Joe Keyes – SH, SO; 20 (England) Scott Leatherbarrow – SH, SO; 21 (England) Alex Foster – SR, LF; 22 (England) Matt Davis – SR, LF; 23 (Malta) Jon Magrin – PR; 24 (Scotland) Alex Walker – FB; 25 (England) Toby Everett – PR, SR; 26 (Ireland) Api Pewhairangi – SO, HK	27 (England) Ben Pointer – HK; 28 (England) Ben Gray – PR, SR; 29 (England) Sadiq Adebiyi – PR, LF; 30 (England) Callum Bustin – CE, SR; 32 (Wales) Elliot Kear – FB, CE, WG; 33 (Australia) Jamie Soward – SO, SH; 34 (England) Lewis Bienek – PR	Head coach: (Scotland) Andrew Henderson; Assistant coaches: (England) Jamie Langley; (England) Danny Ward; Legend: (c) Captain(s); (vc) Vice-captain(s); Injured; Updated: 2016; Source(s): London Broncos squad 2016

== 2016 tables ==
=== Regular season ===
Pos	Club	P	W	D	L	For	Agst	Diff	Points	Qualification
1	Leigh Centurions (C)	23	21	1	1	881	410	471	43	The Qualifiers
2	London Broncos (Q)	23	17	0	6	702	444	258	34	The Qualifiers
3	Batley Bulldogs (Q)	23	15	1	7	589	485	104	31	The Qualifiers
4	Featherstone Rovers (Q)	23	15	0	8	595	384	211	30	The Qualifiers
5	Bradford Bulls (F)	23	13	2	8	717	446	271	28	Championship Shield
6	Halifax (F)	23	13	1	9	615	484	131	27	Championship Shield
7	Sheffield Eagles (F)	23	8	0	15	583	617	-34	16	Championship Shield
8	Dewsbury Rams (F)	23	8	0	15	486	603	-117	16	Championship Shield
9	Swinton Lions (F)	23	7	1	15	449	813	-364	15	Championship Shield
10	Oldham R.L.F.C. (F)	23	7	0	16	401	678	-277	14	Championship Shield
11	Workington Town (F)	23	5	1	17	455	756	-301	11	Championship Shield
12	Whitehaven (F)	23	5	1	17	367	720	-335	11	Championship Shield

C = Champions

Q = Qualified for the qualifiers

F = Unable to qualify for the qualifiers

=== Standings ===
Pos	Team	Pld	W	D	L	PF	PA	PD	Pts	Qualification
1	Leeds Rhinos	7	6	0	1	239	94	+145	12	2017 Super League
2	Leigh Centurions (P)	7	6	0	1	223	193	+30	12	2017 Super League
3	Huddersfield Giants	7	5	0	2	257	166	+91	10	2017 Super League
4	Hull Kingston Rovers (R)	7	4	0	3	235	142	+93	8	Million Pound Game
5	Salford Red Devils	7	3	0	4	208	152	+56	6	Million Pound Game
6	London Broncos	7	3	0	4	221	212	+9	6	2017 Championship
7	Batley Bulldogs	7	1	0	6	111	318	−207	2	2017 Championship
8	Featherstone Rovers	7	0	0	7	96	313	−217	0	2017 Championship

Source: Rugby League Project
Rules for classification: 1) Points; 2) Points difference; 3) Number of points scored;
(P) Promoted; (R) Relegated

== Squad statistics ==
Squad Number	Name	International country	Position	Previous club	Appearances	Tries	Goals	Drop Goals	Points	Notes
1	Ben Hellewell	(Scotland)	Centre	Featherstone Rovers	29	14	0	0	56	
2	Rhys Williams	(Wales)	Wing	Central Queensland Capras	31	31	-	-	124	
3	Nathan Stapleton	(Australia)	Centre	Sydney Roosters	2	0	0	0	0	
4	Wes Naiqama	(Fiji)	Centre	Penrith Panthers	13	4	49	0	114	
5	Iliess Macani	(England)	Wing	London Broncos Academy	22	9	0	0	36	
6	Israel Eliab	(Papua New Guinea)	Stand-off	PNG Hunters	8	3	0	0	12	
7	William Barthau	(France)	Scrum-half	Catalans Dragons	18	12	5	1	59	
8	Nick Slyney	(Australia)	Prop	Brisbane Broncos	30	7	0	0	28	
9	James Cunningham	(England)	Hooker	Hull F.C.	26	10	0	0	40	
10	Eddie Battye	(England)	Prop	Sheffield Eagles	29	4	0	0	16	
11	Daniel Harrison	(Australia)	Second-row	Manly Warringah Sea Eagles	30	6	0	0	24	
12	Matt Garside	(England)	Second-row	Sheffield Eagles	29	10	0	0	40	
13	Rhys Lovegrove	(Scotland)	Loose forward	Hull Kingston Rovers	0	0	0	0	0	
14	Andy Ackers	(England)	Hooker	Swinton Lions	28	8	0	0	32	
15	Jack Bussey	(England)	Loose forward	Featherstone Rovers	28	4	2	0	20	
16	Mark Ioane	(New Zealand)	Prop	St. George Illawarra Dragons	30	7	0	0	28	
17	Mark Offerdahl	(United States)	Prop	Connecticut Wildcats	22	5	0	0	20	
18	Jamie Thackray	(England)	Prop	Hullensians RU	19	1	0	0	4	
19	Joe Keyes	(Republic of Ireland)	Scrum-half	London Broncos Academy	4	1	0	0	4	
20	Scott Leatherbarrow	(England)	Scrum-half	Keighley Cougars	17	2	10	1	29	
21	Alex Foster	(England)	Loose forward	Leeds Rhinos	20	11	0	0	44	
22	Matt Davis	(England)	Loose forward	London Broncos Academy	8	0	0	0	0	
23	Jonathan Magrin	(Malta)	Prop	London Broncos Academy	17	0	0	0	0	
24	Alex Walker	(Scotland)	Fullback	London Broncos Academy	14	3	0	0	12	
25	Toby Everett	(England)	Prop	London Broncos Academy	1	0	0	0	0	
26	Api Pewhairangi	(Republic of Ireland)	Stand-off	Parramatta Eels	12	9	23	0	82	
27	Ben Pointer	(England)	Hooker	London Broncos Academy	0	0	0	0	0	
28	Ben Gray	(England)	Prop	London Broncos Academy	0	0	0	0	0	
29	Sadiq Adebiyi	(Nigeria)	Second-row	London Broncos Academy	1	1	0	0	4	
30	Callum Bustin	(England)	Centre	London Broncos Academy	1	0	0	0	0	
32	Elliot Kear	(Wales)	Fullback, Wing, Centre	Bradford Bulls	27	10	0	0	40	
33	Jamie Soward	(Australia)	Stand-off	Penrith Panthers	8	3	34	1	81	
34	Lewis Bienek	(Republic of Ireland)	Prop	London Broncos Academy	1	0	0	0	0	
35	Kameron Pearce-Paul	(England)	Centre	London Broncos Academy	2	0	0	0	0	
