= 2015 London Broncos season =

- 2015 Championship Rank: 7th
- Play-off result: Championship Shield Final
- Challenge Cup: Fourth Round
- 2015 record: Wins: 15; draws: 0; losses: 16
- Points scored: For: 808; against: 790

Team information
- Chairman: David Hughes
- Head Coach: Joey Grima (until 2 March 2015); Andrew Henderson (from 2 March 2015)
- Captain: Nick Slyney & Richard Mathers
- Stadium: The Hive Stadium

Top scorers
- Tries: Rhys Williams - 21
- Goals: Wes Naiqama - 88
- Points: Wes Naiqama - 212
Home colours	Away colours
← 2014	List of seasons	2016 →

The 2015 London Broncos season was the thirty-sixth in the club's history and their first season in the RFL Championship. Competing in 2015 Kingstone Press Championship, the club was coached by Joey Grima, before being replaced by his assistant Andrew Henderson in March. They finishing in 7th place, reaching the Championship Shield Final and reaching the Fourth Round of the 2015 Challenge Cup.

It was their second since moving to the Hive Stadium. They exited the Challenge Cup with a defeat by the Leigh Centurions.

== 2015 squad ==
London Broncos 2015 Squad
First team squad				Coaching staff
1 (England) Richard Mathers (c) – FB; 2 (Wales) Rhys Williams – WG; 3 (Australia) Ben Farrar – CE, FB; 4 (Fiji) Wes Naiqama – CE; 5 (Scotland) Ben Hellewell – WG, CE, FB; 6 (New Zealand) Liam Foran – SO; 7 (France) William Barthau – SH, SO; 8 (Australia) Nick Slyney (c) – PR, LF; 9 (Italy) Ray Nasso – HK; 10 (Spain) Josh Cordoba – PR; 11 (Australia) Daniel Harrison – SR; 12 (Scotland) Rhys Lovegrove – LF, SR; 13 (England) Luke Adamson – LF, SR	14 (England) Brad Dwyer – HK; 15 (England) Matt Garside – SR, CE; 16 (England) Glenn Riley – PR; 17 (Albania) Erjon Dollapi – PR; 18 (Malta) Jon Wallace – PR; 19 (Ireland) Joe Keyes – SH, SO; 20 (England) Iliess Macani – WG, FB; 21 (England) Joel Wicks – HK, CE; 22 (Scotland) Oscar Thomas – SO, FB; 23 (England) Toby Everett – PR, SR; 24 (Scotland) Alex Walker – FB; 25 (Scotland) Harvey Burnett – CE; 26 (England) Sean Morris – FB, WG	27 (Malta) Jarrod Sammut – SO, SH; 28 (England) Tom Gilmore – SH, SO; 29 (England) Jamie Thackray – PR; 30 (England) Dave Williams – PR; 31 (England) Elliott Minchella – SR, LF; 32 (Wales) Elliot Kear – FB, CE, WG; 33 (England) Chris Annakin – SR, LF; 34 (England) Matt Davis – SR, LF; 35 (Scotland) Andrew Henderson – HK; 36 (Scotland) Jonathan Walker – PR; 37 (England) Jason Walton – SR, CE; 38 (England) James Cunningham – HK; 39 (England) Ben Gray – PR, SR	40 (Nigeria) Sadiq Adebiyi – PR, LF; 41 (England) Ben Pointer – HK	Head coach: (Australia) Joey Grima; Assistant coaches: (Scotland) Andrew Henderson; (England) Danny Ward; (England) Brian Noble; Legend: (c) Captain(s); (vc) Vice-captain(s); Injured; Updated: 2015; Source(s): London Broncos squad 2015

== 2015 tables ==
=== Regular season ===
Pos	Team	Pld	W	D	L	PF	PA	PD	Pts	Qualification
1	Leigh Centurions	23	21	1	1	972	343	+629	43	The Qualifiers
2	Bradford Bulls	23	18	1	4	828	387	+441	37	The Qualifiers
3	Sheffield Eagles	23	17	0	6	586	451	+135	34	The Qualifiers
4	Halifax	23	16	0	7	646	377	+269	32	The Qualifiers
5	Featherstone Rovers	23	13	0	10	633	565	+68	26	Championship Shield
6	Dewsbury Rams	23	12	1	10	490	461	+29	25	Championship Shield
7	London Broncos	23	12	0	11	538	510	+28	24	Championship Shield
8	Workington Town	23	7	1	15	379	631	−252	15	Championship Shield
9	Batley Bulldogs	23	7	0	16	421	539	−118	14	Championship Shield
10	Whitehaven	23	7	0	16	418	671	−253	14	Championship Shield
11	Hunslet Hawks	23	5	0	18	362	769	−407	10	Championship Shield
12	Doncaster	23	1	0	22	282	851	−569	2	Championship Shield

Source: Rugby League Project
Rules for classification: 1) Points; 2) Points difference; 3) Number of points scored;

=== Championship Shield ===
The third of the three "Super 8" groups saw teams finishing 5th to 12th in the regular Championship table. Like the Super League 8's, these teams retained their original points and played 7 extra games, with the teams finishing in the top 4 places after these extra games contesting playoffs similar to Super League, with 1st v 4th and 2nd vs 3rd, with the winners contesting the Championship Shield Grand Final. The two teams finishing at the bottom of this Super 8s group (7th and 8th) were relegated to the League 1 2016 season, and replaced by the two 2015 League One promoted sides.

Pos	Team	Pld	W	D	L	PF	PA	PD	Pts	Qualification or relegation
1	Featherstone Rovers (Q)	30	19	0	11	809	701	+108	38	Qualified for the Championship Shield; 2015 Semi-Finals
2	Dewsbury Rams (Q)	30	17	1	12	686	624	+62	35	Qualified for the Championship Shield; 2015 Semi-Finals
3	London Broncos (Q)	30	15	0	15	756	674	+82	30	Qualified for the Championship Shield; 2015 Semi-Finals
4	Workington Town (Q)	30	11	1	18	587	782	−195	23	Qualified for the Championship Shield; 2015 Semi-Finals
5	Batley Bulldogs	30	10	0	20	645	707	−62	20	
6	Whitehaven	30	10	0	20	618	921	−303	20	
7	Hunslet Hawks (R)	30	8	0	22	518	957	−439	16	Relegated to 2016 League One
8	Doncaster (R)	30	2	0	28	401	1128	−727	4	Relegated to 2016 League One

(Q) Qualified for the Semi Final; (R) Relegated to League 1

#	Home	Score	Away	Match Information
#	Home	Score	Away	Date and Time (Local)	Venue	Referee	Attendance
CHAMPIONSHIP SHIELD SEMI-FINALS
SF1	Featherstone Rovers	52 – 14	Workington Town	27 September, 15:00	Post Office Road, Featherstone		1,233
SF1	Dewsbury Rams	18 – 34	London Broncos	27 September, 15:00.	Tetley's Stadium, Dewsbury		940
CHAMPIONSHIP SHIELD GRAND FINAL
F	Featherstone Rovers	34 – 6	London Broncos	Sunday 4 October, 4:30pm	Select Security Stadium	Chris Campbell	4,179

== Squad statistics ==
Squad Number	Name	International country	Position	Previous club	Appearances	Tries	Goals	Drop Goals	Points	Notes
1	Richard Mathers	(England)	Fullback	Wakefield Trinity Wildcats	4	0	0	0	0	
2	Rhys Williams	(Wales)	Wing	Central Queensland Capras	33	21	0	0	84	
3	Ben Farrar	(Australia)	Centre	Manly Warringah Sea Eagles	13	0	0	0	0	
4	Wes Naiqama	(Fiji)	Centre	Penrith Panthers	27	9	88	0	212	
5	Ben Hellewell	(Scotland)	Centre, Fullback, Wing	Featherstone Rovers	33	19	0	0	76	
6	Liam Foran	(New Zealand)	Stand-off	Salford Red Devils	0	0	0	0	0	
7	William Barthau	(France)	Scrum-half	Catalans Dragons	13	3	23	0	58	
8	Nick Slyney	(Australia)	Prop	Brisbane Broncos	2	0	0	0	0	
9	Ray Nasso	(Italy)	Hooker	Sporting Olympique Avignon	22	2	0	0	8	
10	Josh Cordoba	(Spain)	Prop	Cronulla-Sutherland Sharks	2	0	0	0	0	
11	Daniel Harrison	(Australia)	Second-row	Manly Warringah Sea Eagles	23	8	0	0	32	
12	Rhys Lovegrove	(Scotland)	Prop, Loose forward, Second-row	Hull Kingston Rovers	21	1	0	0	4	
13	Luke Adamson	(England)	Loose forward	Halifax	0	0	0	0	0	
14	Brad Dwyer	(England)	Hooker	Warrington Wolves	12	4	0	0	16	loan
15	Matt Garside	(England)	Second-row	Sheffield Eagles	32	9	0	0	36	
16	Glenn Riley	(England)	Prop	Warrington Wolves	12	0	0	0	0	
17	Erjon Dollapi	(Albania)	Prop	London Broncos Academy	19	3	0	0	12	
18	Jon Wallace	(Malta)	Prop	London Broncos Academy	27	2	0	0	8	
19	Joe Keyes	(Ireland)	Scrum-half, Stand-off	London Broncos Academy	17	3	3	0	18	
20	Iliess Macani	(England)	Wing	London Broncos Academy	30	13	0	0	52	
21	Joel Wicks	(England)	Loose forward	London Broncos Academy	11	0	0	0	0	
22	Oscar Thomas	(Scotland)	Stand-off	London Broncos Academy	16	10	1	1	43	
23	Toby Everett	(England)	Prop	London Broncos Academy	20	0	0	0	0	
24	Alex Walker	(Scotland)	Fullback	London Broncos Academy	1	0	0	0	0	
25	Harvey Burnett	(Scotland)	Second-row	London Broncos Academy	1	0	0	0	0	
26	Sean Morris	(England)	Wing	Oxford	8	6	0	0	24	
27	Jarrod Sammut	(Malta)	Stand-off	Wakefield Trinity Wildcats	5	1	0	0	4	loan
28	Tom Gilmore	(England)	Scrum-half	Widnes Vikings	15	4	0	0	16	loan
29	Jamie Thackray	(England)	Prop	Hullensians RU	21	5	0	0	20	
30	Dave Williams	(England)	Prop	London Skolars	4	0	0	0	0	loan
31	Elliot Minchella	(England)	Loose forward	Leeds Rhinos	18	4	0	1	17	loan
32	Elliot Kear	(Wales)	Fullback, Centre	Bradford Bulls	21	6	1	0	26	
33	Chris Annakin	(England)	Second-row	Wakefield Trinity Wildcats	2	0	0	0	0	loan
34	Matt Davis	(England)	Loose forward	London Broncos Academy	15	1	0	0	4	
35	Andrew Henderson	(Scotland)	Hooker	Sheffield Eagles	17	0	0	0	0	
36	Jonathan Walker	(Scotland)	Prop	Leigh Centurions	16	1	0	0	4	loan
37	Jason Walton	(England)	Second-row	Salford Red Devils	6	3	0	0	12	
38	James Cunningham	(England)	Hooker	Hull F.C.	13	3	0	0	12	
39	Ben Gray	(England)	Prop	London Broncos Academy	2	0	0	0	0	
40	Sadiq Adebiyi	(England)	Second-row	London Broncos Academy	5	2	0	0	8	
41	Ben Pointer	(England)	Hooker	London Broncos Academy	2	0	0	0	0	
