= Joey Grima =

Australian professional RL coach

Personal information
- Full name: Joseph Grima
- Born: 18 April 1973 (age 51)
- Position: Hooker

Coaching information
Club
Years	Team	Gms	W	D	L	W%
2013–15	London Broncos	19	12	0	7	63
Representative
Years	Team	Gms	W	D	L	W%
2004–2008	Malta	9	7	0	2	78
- Source: As of 25 July 2021

Joseph Grima (born 18 April 1973) is an Australian professional rugby league football coach, most recently head coach of the London Broncos. Grima attended renowned rugby league school, Patrician Brothers' College, Fairfield.

== Managerial career ==
Grima has extensive experience in the NRL as an assistant coach at Parramatta Eels, Cronulla Sharks and the St George-Illawarra Dragons.

He was appointed as the assistant coach at the capital Super League club, London Broncos ahead of the 2014 season after being recommended by Jamie Soward to former head coach Tony Rea.

On 14 May he was appointed as head coach of the English capital side and signed a deal until the end of 2015. His first game in charge, London lost to Huddersfield Giants 16–30 at The Hive Stadium on 10 May and at the Magic Weekend on 17 May they narrowly lost to Catalans Dragons 22–24 at the Etihad Stadium. His first 2 games in charge were the two best performances by the Broncos in 2014.

On 13 July 2014, Grima's London Broncos were relegated to the Kingstone Press Championship. Grima started to rebuild all aspects of the club signing/resigning 17 players to date from the academy, current players and players in key positions such as Richard Mathers, William Barthau, Nick Slyney, Josh Cordoba and Rhys Williams.

After taking over from Rea, Grima won his first game against Super League giants Leeds Rhinos 40–36 at The Hive.

On 9 October 2014, London Broncos announced Grima had signed a 2-year contract extension to keep him as head coach until the end of 2016. He won his second game as Broncos head coach 26–22 against Doncaster in the Broncos' first game in the Championship.

On 2 March 2015, Grima announced he was to step down as Broncos coach with immediate effect due to an illness to a family member in Australia and relocated back home to Australia.

Grima returned to Australia and was signed as Brad Arthur's assistant coach with the Parramatta Eels for the 2016-17, 2017-18 seasons. In 2019, Grima was named Eels coaching director.

In May, 2023 to aid with the unveiling of the NRL's 18th franchise in 2027, Grima assumed the task of managing elite development and pathways in PNG. Because of his intimate association with PNG, as well as his accomplished reputation as a head coach with the London Broncos and an assistant coach with the Dragons, Sharks, and Eels.

=== International management ===
Between 2004 and 2006, Grima was the head coach of Malta after being one of the founding members of the MRL (Malta Rugby League).

In 2018, Grima was brought in to support the staff and programs of the PNG Kumuls and Orchids. On November 17th, 2019, at The National Football Stadium in Port Moresby, both the PNG Kumuls men's team and the Orchids women's team pulled off major upsets by defeating Great Britain Lions and Roses, respectively. This victory sent Papua New Guinea into a frenzy of celebration.

=== Statistics ===
As of 22 June 2014

Team	From	To	Record							
Team	From	To	G	W	D	L	PF	PA	PD	Win %
Malta	2004	2008	9	7	0	2	0	0	+0	77.78
London Broncos	5 Oct 2013	2 March 2015	19	12	0	7	837	334	+503	63.16
