= James Cunningham (rugby league) =

English rugby league footballer

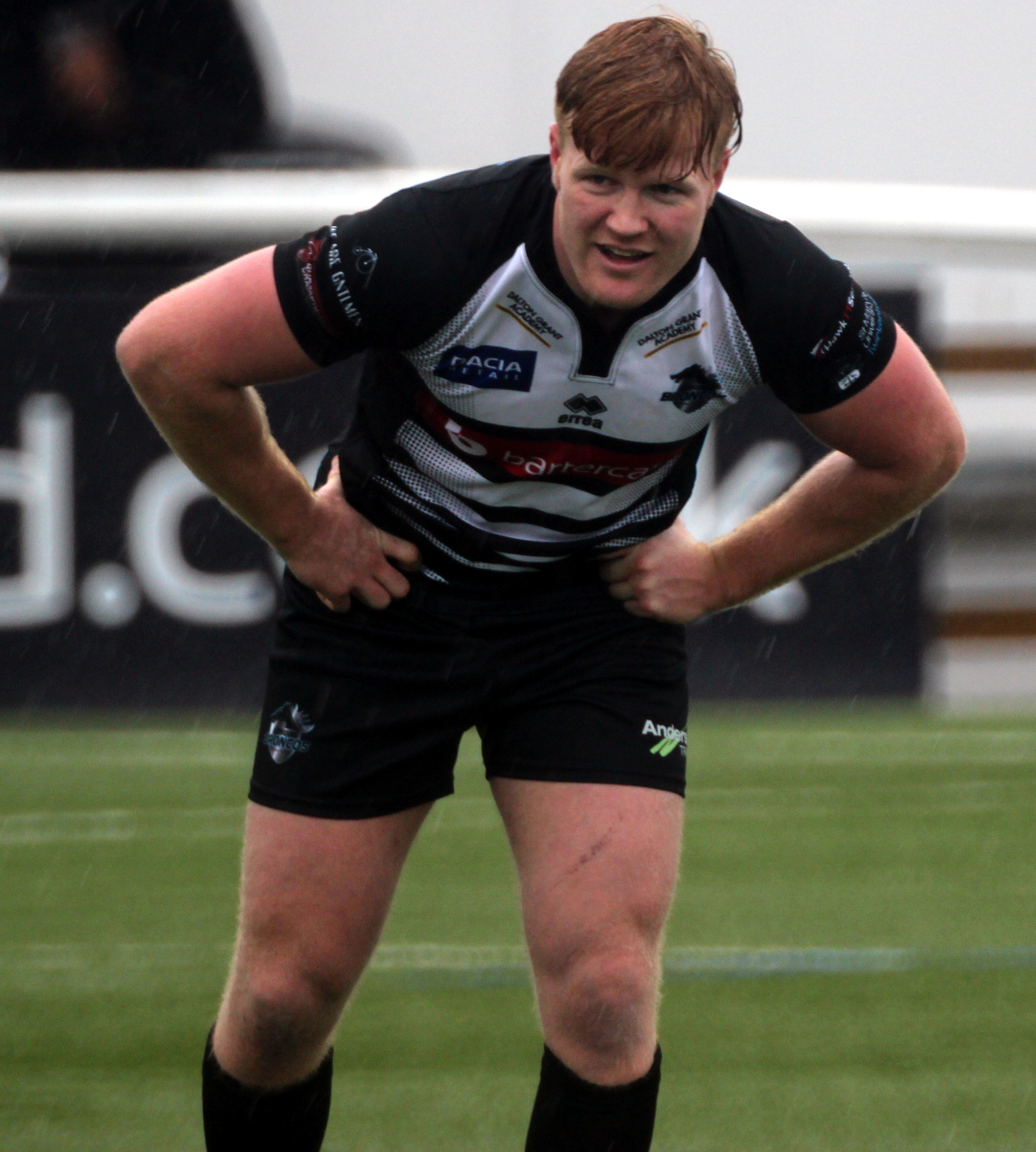

Personal information
- Born: 30 April 1994 (age 32) Hull, East Riding of Yorkshire, England
- Height: 6 ft 0 in (1.83 m)
- Weight: 14 st 7 lb (92 kg)

Playing information
- Position: Hooker, Scrum-half, Stand-off
Club
Years	Team	Pld	T	G	FG	P
2012–15	Hull F.C.	10	1	0	0	4
2014(loan)	→ London Broncos	17	2	0	0	8
2015(DR)	→ Doncaster	5	0	0	0	0
2015–19	London Broncos	106	32	0	0	128
2020	Toronto Wolfpack	3	0	0	0	0
2021	Huddersfield Giants	11	0	0	0	0
2022	Toulouse Olympique	12	1	0	0	4
2023–24	York Knights	30	3	0	0	12
	Total	194	39	0	0	156
- Source: As of 16 June 2026

James Cunningham (born 30 April 1994) is an English former rugby league footballer who last played as a hooker for York Knights in the Championship.

He has played for Hull F.C. in the Super League, and on loan from Hull at the London Broncos in the top flight and Doncaster in the Championship. He also played for London in the Championship and the Super League before joining the Toronto Wolfpack in the top flight. At the Broncos he occasionally played as a scrum-half and stand-off. He joined Toulouse from the Huddersfield Giants.

== Background ==
Cunningham was born in Kingston upon Hull, East Riding of Yorkshire, England.

== Career ==
=== Hull F.C. ===
He played for Hull F.C. in the Super League, and on loan from Hull at the London Broncos in the top flight and Doncaster in the Championship.

=== London Broncos ===
The London Broncos paid an undisclosed fee to Hull F.C. in 2015. It was his second stint at the London Broncos after being on loan there in the 2014 season in Super League.

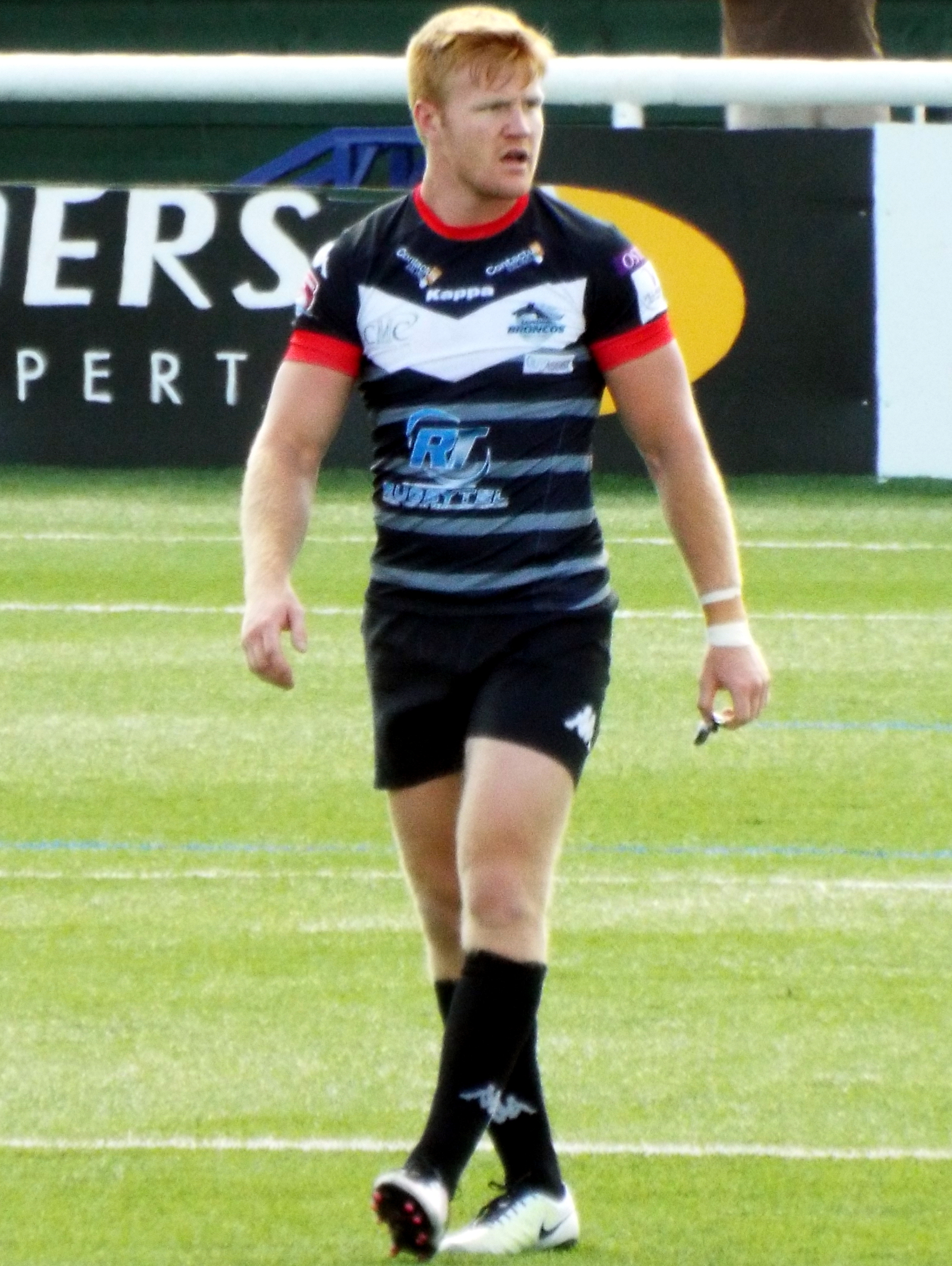
Cunningham playing for the London Broncos in 2016

On 26 October 2018, Cunningham signed a one-year deal with the London Broncos keeping him at the club until the end of the 2019 season.

=== Toronto Wolfpack ===
Cunningham left London to sign for the Toronto Wolfpack during 2019.

=== Huddersfield Giants ===
On 9 November 2020, it was announced that Cunningham would join Huddersfield from the 2021 season on a two-year deal.

=== Toulouse Olympique ===
On 16 Oct 2021 it was reported that he had signed for Toulouse Olympique in the Super League. He was signed on a two-year contract until the end of the 2023 season.

=== York Knights ===
In February 2023, it was reported that Cunningham had joined York Knights on a two-year deal. He announced his retirement at the end of 2024.

== International career ==
In July 2018 he was selected in the England Knights Performance squad.

== Club statistics ==
Year	Club	Comp.	Apps	Tries	Goals	DG	Points
2012	Hull F.C.	Super League	1	0	0	0	0
2013	Hull F.C.	Super League	1	1	0	0	4
2014	Hull F.C.	Super League	2	0	0	0	0
2014	London Broncos	Super League	17	2	0	0	8
2015	Hull F.C.	Super League	6	0	0	0	0
2015	Doncaster	Championship	5	0	0	0	0
2015	London Broncos	Championship	11	3	0	0	12
2016	London Broncos	Championship	26	10	0	0	40
2017	London Broncos	Championship	14	5	0	0	20
2018	London Broncos	Championship	26	13	0	0	52
2019	London Broncos	Super League	26	1	0	0	4
2020	Toronto Wolfpack	Super League	3	0	0	0	0
2021	Huddersfield Giants	Super League	1	0	0	0	0
2022	Toulouse Olympique	Super League	12	1	0	0	4
2023	York Knights	RFL Championship	16	1	0	0	4
2024	York Knights	RFL Championship	14	2	0	0	8
Club career total			195	39	0	0	156
