= Lewis Foster (rugby league) =

English rugby league footballer

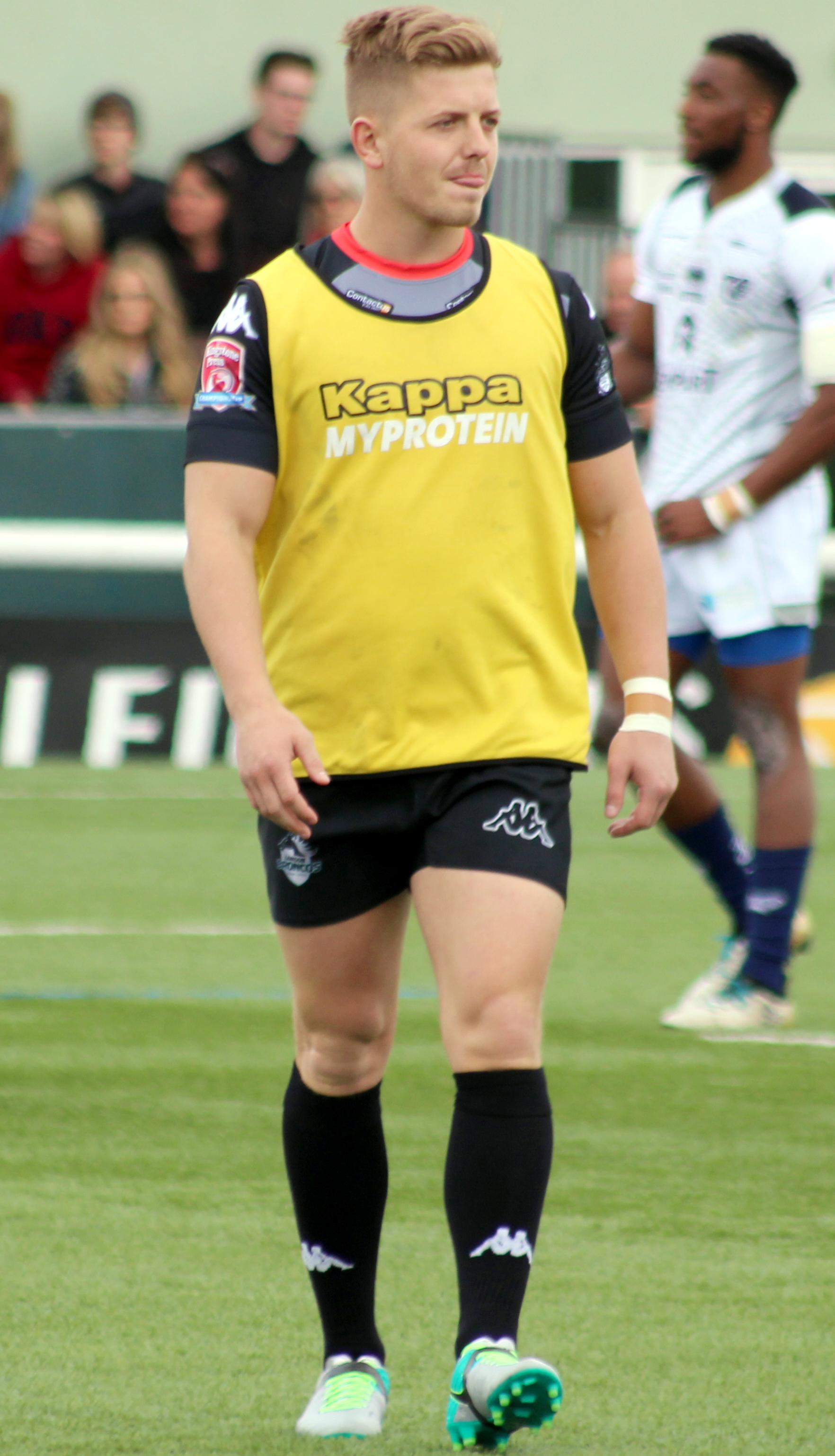

Personal information
- Born: 21 December 1993 (age 32) St Helens, Merseyside, England

Playing information
- Position: Scrum-half, Stand-off, Hooker
Club
Years	Team	Pld	T	G	FG	P
2014–17	Leigh Centurions	12	1	0	0	4
2016(loan)	→ Oldham	7	1	0	0	4
2017(DR)	→ Sheffield Eagles	2	0	0	0	0
2017(loan)	→ Whitehaven	1	0	0	0	0
2017(loan)	→ London Broncos	6	0	0	0	0
2017(loan)	→ Rochdale Hornets	11	2	0	1	9
	Total	39	4	0	1	17
- Source: As of 25 November 2017

Lewis Foster (born 21 December 1993) is an English former professional rugby league footballer who played for the Leigh Centurions in the Kingstone Press Championship. His playing position is in the halves or as a Hooker.

== Playing career ==
Foster made his senior début for the Leigh Centurions on 18 May 2014 in a Championship match against Doncaster.

He has played for the London Broncos, Oldham RLFC and the Rochdale Hornets on loan and the Sheffield Eagles and Whitehaven on dual registration from the Leigh Centurions.
