= Glenn Riley =

English rugby league footballer

Personal information
- Full name: Glenn Alan James Riley
- Born: 29 January 1992 (age 34) Whitehaven, Cumbria, England
- Height: 6 ft 5 in (1.95 m)
- Weight: 17 st 9 lb (112 kg)

Playing information
- Position: Prop
Club
Years	Team	Pld	T	G	FG	P
2012–14	Warrington Wolves	18	1	0	0	4
2012(loan)	→ Swinton Lions	12	0	0	0	0
2013(loan)	→ Swinton Lions	17	0	0	0	0
2014(loan)	→ Swinton Lions	12	0	0	0	0
2015	London Broncos	10	0	0	0	0
2015(loan)	→ London Skolars	1	0	0	0	0
2016–17	Whitehaven	52	7	1	0	30
2018–19	Barrow Raiders	23	0	0	0	0
2020–22	Whitehaven	0	0	0	0	0
2022–	Workington Town	5	1	0	0	4
	Total	150	9	1	0	38
- Source: As of 1 January 2023

Glenn Riley (born 29 January 1992) is a professional rugby league footballer who plays as a prop for Workington Town in the Championship.

He has previously played for Warrington Wolves in the Super League, and spent time on loan from Warrington at Swinton Lions in the Championship. Riley has also played for London Broncos in the Championship, and spent time on loan from the Broncos at London Skolars in League 1. He also played for Whitehaven in the second tier and in League 1, and Barrow Raiders in the Championship.

== Career ==
In 2012, he was loaned to Swinton Lions from Warrington Wolves making 12 appearances. He was loaned on dual registration to Swinton Lions for 2013 where he made a greater impact, however he still made sporadic appearances for Warrington Wolves in the Super League and Challenge Cup.

In the 2014 season, he began the season making six appearances for Warrington, before being loaned back to Swinton Lions where he made twelve appearances.

In September 2014, he was signed by the London Broncos but moved to Whitehaven the following year. In November 2017 he joined Barrow Raiders. Riley scored his first try for the club on April 7, 2019 against Leigh Centurions.

In September 2019, Riley rejoined hometown club Whitehaven for the 2020 season, following their promotion to the Championship.
