= Scott Leatherbarrow =

English rugby league footballer

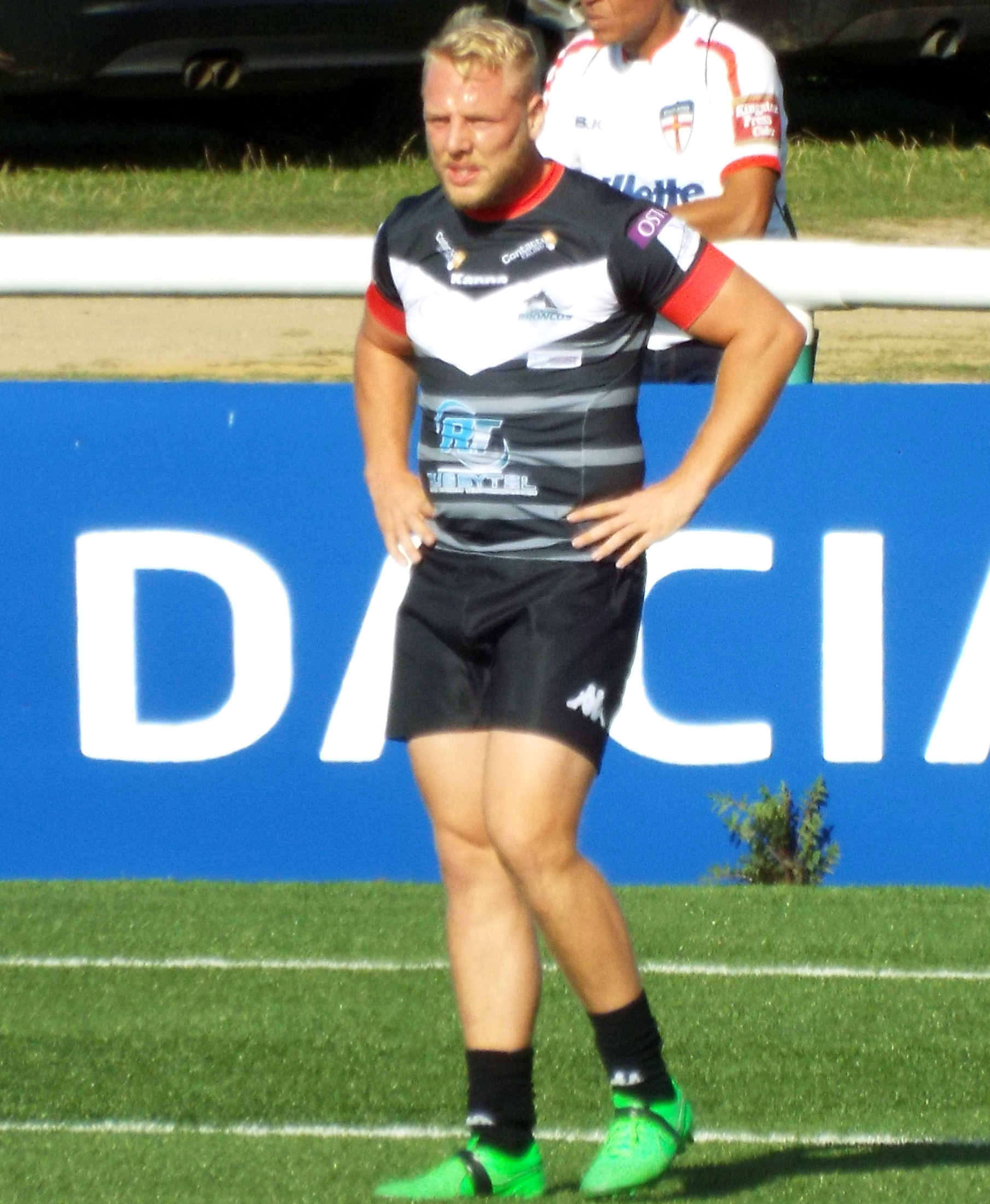

Personal information
- Full name: Scott Leatherbarrow
- Born: 3 September 1990 (age 35) Wigan, Greater Manchester, England
- Height: 5 ft 10 in (1.78 m)
- Weight: 14 st 9 lb (93 kg)

Playing information
- Position: Scrum-half, Stand-off, Hooker
Club
Years	Team	Pld	T	G	FG	P
2012	South Wales Scorpions	4	1	4	0	12
2013	Keighley Cougars	23	3	55	0	122
2014–15	Batley Bulldogs	54	7	141	5	315
2016	London Broncos	17	2	10	1	29
2016(loan)	→ Hemel Stags	2	0	0	0	0
2017	Oldham	26	0	65	0	130
2018	Workington Town	6	0	1	0	2
2023	Great Britain Police	2	0	3	0	6
	Total	134	13	279	6	616
- Source: As of 10 May 2023

Scott Leatherbarrow is an English rugby league footballer who played for South Wales Scorpions, Keighley Cougars, London Broncos, Hemel Stags, Oldham and Workington Town as a stand-off or scrum-half.

His professional career ran from 2012 with South Wales until 2018 when he played for Workington. After leaving the professional game Leatherbarrow joined Greater Manchester Police. In 2022 and 2023 he appeared for the Great Britain Police rugby league team in the Challenge Cup as well as making appearances for the police team in the President's Cup.
