= Kameron Pearce-Paul =

English rugby league footballer

Kam Pearce-Paul
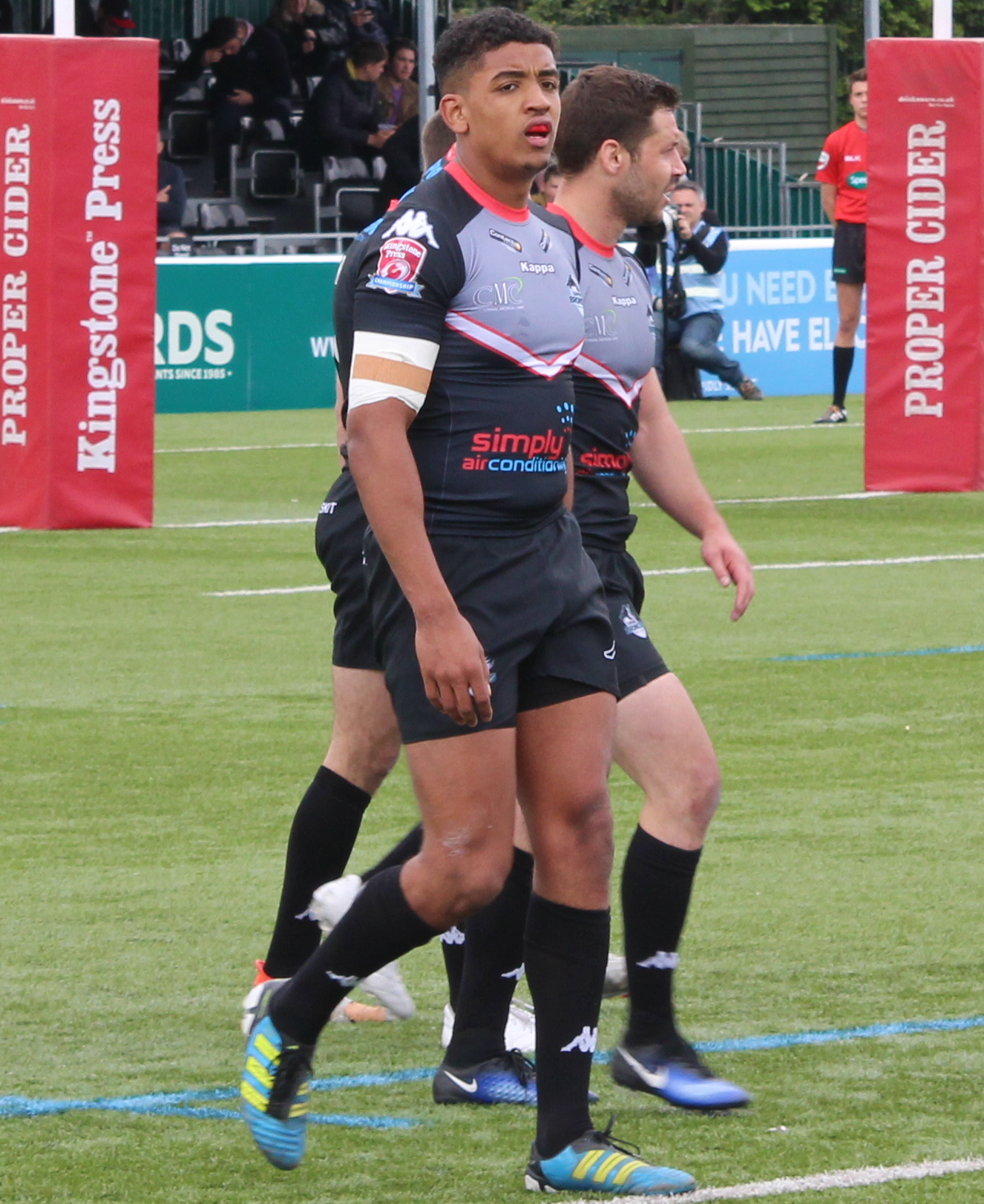

Personal information
- Full name: Kameron Karstin Pearce-Paul
- Born: 28 February 1997 (age 29) Greenwich, London, England
- Height: 6 ft 2 in (1.88 m)
- Weight: 15 st 0 lb (95 kg)

Playing information
- Position: Centre, Wing
Club
Years	Team	Pld	T	G	FG	P
2016–18	London Broncos	5	1	0	0	4
2016(loan)	→ Hemel Stags	11	2	0	0	8
2017(loan)	→ London Skolars	6	0	0	0	0
2017(loan)	→ Oldham	8	0	0	0	0
2018(loan)	→ Coventry Bears	24	8	0	0	32
2019	Coventry Bears	17	2	0	0	8
2020–	London Skolars	2	0	0	0	0
	Total	73	13	0	0	52
- Source: As of 28 December 2020
- Relatives: Kai Pearce-Paul (brother)

Kameron Pearce-Paul (born 28 February 1997) is an English former professional rugby league footballer who played as a centre or winger for the London Broncos and London Skolars in League 1.

== Background ==
He is the older brother of Kai Pearce-Paul who plays for Newcastle Knights and Kaden Pearce-Paul who plays for Saracens academy.

== Playing career ==
Pearce-Paul has previously spent time on loan at the Hemel Stags and Oldham RLFC in League 1.
