= Mark Ioane =

NZ rugby league footballer

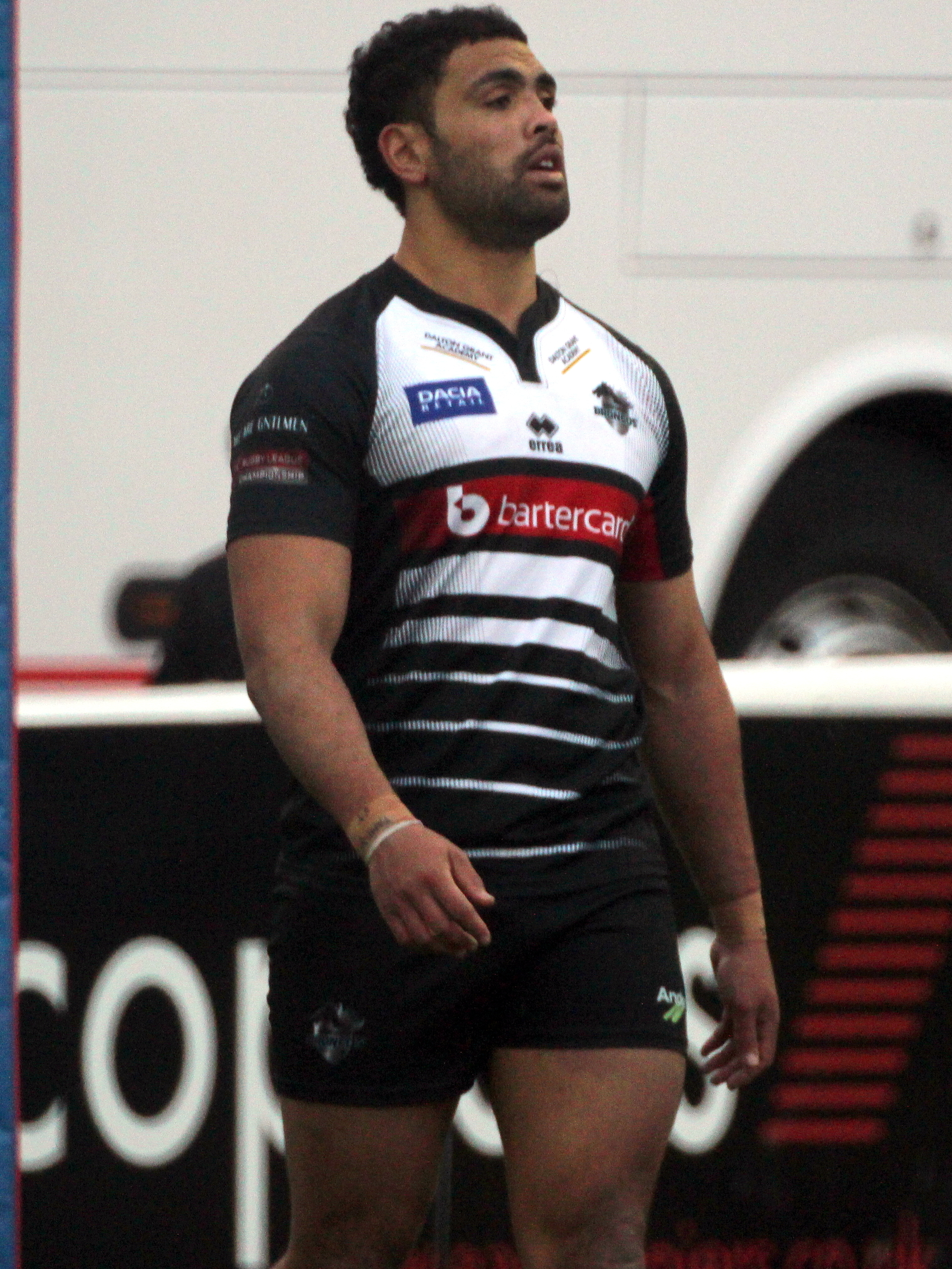

Personal information
- Born: 3 December 1990 (age 35) Auckland, New Zealand
- Height: 6 ft 1 in (1.85 m)
- Weight: 17 st 7 lb (111 kg)

Playing information
- Position: Prop, Second-row
Club
Years	Team	Pld	T	G	FG	P
2013–15	Gold Coast Titans	24	0	0	0	0
2015	St. George Illawarra	4	1	0	0	4
2016–19	London Broncos	101	21	0	0	84
2020–22	Leigh Centurions	44	8	0	0	32
2023–25	Keighley Cougars	55	16	0	0	64
2026	North Wales Crusaders	7	1	0	0	4
2026–	Rochdale Hornets	0	0	0	0	0
	Total	235	47	0	0	188
Representative
Years	Team	Pld	T	G	FG	P
2015	Queensland Residents	1	0	0	0	0
- Source: As of 20 November 2026

Mark Ioane (born 3 December 1990) is a New Zealand professional rugby league footballer who plays as a prop for the Rochdale Hornets in the RFL Championship.

He has previously played for the Gold Coast Titans and St. George Illawarra Dragons in the NRL, and the London Broncos and Leigh Centurions in the Championship and the Super League.

== Early years ==
Ioane was born in Auckland, New Zealand. He attended De La Salle College in Māngere East.

== Playing career ==
=== New Zealand Warriors ===
Ioane was signed by the New Zealand Warriors and played 25 games for the Junior Warriors in the 2010 Toyota Cup, scoring four tries. He started at prop in the grand final, won by the Junior Warriors 42–28.

He was selected by the Junior Kiwis at the end of 2010.

=== Canberra Raiders ===
In 2011 Ioane joined the Canberra Raiders but could not break into the first grade side. While at the Raiders Ioane played for the Souths Logan Magpies in the Queensland Cup and the Mount Pritchard Mounties in the NSW Cup. Ioane won the Mounties player of the year award in 2012.

=== Gold Coast Titans ===
Ioane signed for the Gold Coast Titans in 2013 on a one-season deal and played for the Burleigh Bears in the Queensland Cup. He was named to make his National Rugby League debut for the Gold Coast against the New Zealand Warriors on 5 May 2013.

=== St. George Illawarra Dragons ===
On 1 July 2015, Ioane joined the St. George Illawarra Dragons mid-season for the rest of the year.

=== London Broncos ===
On 9 November 2015, he signed one-year contract with English Kingstone Press Championship side, London Broncos starting in 2016.

=== Leigh Centurions ===
Ioane joined the Leigh Centurions ahead of the 2020 RFL Championship season. On 28 May 2022, Ioane played for Leigh in their 2022 RFL 1895 Cup final victory over Featherstone.

=== Keighley Cougars ===
Released by Leigh after three seasons, Ioane signed for Keighley in October 2022 on a two-year deal.

On 8 January 2026 it was reported that he had left Keighley Cougars

=== North Wales Crusaders ===
On 12 January 2026 it was reported that he had signed for North Wales Crusaders in the RFL Championship

=== Rochdale Hornets ===
On 4 June 2026 it was reported that he had signed for Rochdale Hornets in the RFL Championship until the end of the 2026 season

== Statistics ==
Year	Team	Games	Tries	Pts
2013	Gold Coast Titans	7		
2014	Gold Coast Titans	11		
2015	Gold Coast Titans	6		
2015	St. George Illawarra Dragons	4	1	4
2016	London Broncos	8	2	8
2017	London Broncos	7		
2018	London Broncos	8	1	4
2019	London Broncos	16	2	8
2020	Leigh Leopards	5		
2021	Leigh Leopards	16	2	8
2022	Leigh Leopards	23	6	24
2023	Keighley	23	7	28
2024	Keighley	26	9	36
2025	Keighley	6		
2026	North Wales Crusaders	7	1	4
2026	Rochdale Hornets			
	Totals	235	47	188
