= Josh Cordoba =

Australian rugby league footballer (born 1984)

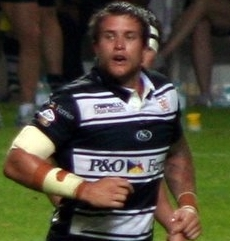

Personal information
- Full name: Joshua Cordoba
- Born: 29 January 1984 (age 42) Wollongong, New South Wales, Australia

Playing information
- Height: 188 cm (6 ft 2 in)
- Weight: 103 kg (16 st 3 lb)
- Position: Prop
Club
Years	Team	Pld	T	G	FG	P
2006–09	Parramatta Eels	60	2	0	0	8
2009	Hull FC	8	1	0	0	4
2010–12	Cronulla Sharks	36	2	0	0	8
2014	London Broncos	2	0	0	0	0
	Total	106	5	0	0	20

Josh Cordoba (born 29 January 1984) is an Australian former professional rugby league footballer who played as a prop for the Parramatta Eels and the Cronulla-Sutherland Sharks in the NRL, Hull FC in the Super League and the London Broncos in the Kingstone Press Championship.

== Playing career ==
Cordoba debuted for Parramatta in round 1 of the 2006 NRL season against the Newcastle Knights. Cordoba played in 14 first grade games in his rookie season, including the final eleven games of the season.

In the 2007 NRL season, Cordoba played nearly every game for Parramatta including the club's preliminary final defeat against Melbourne.

In the 2008 NRL season, Cordoba played 19 games as Parramatta finished a disappointing 11th on the table and missed out on the finals. In the 2009 NRL season, Cordoba was limited to only 3 games and did not feature in the club's finals campaign or 2009 NRL Grand Final. Midway through 2009, Cordoba signed a one-year contract to join Hull in the Super League.

In 2010, Cordoba signed for Cronulla-Sutherland. In his two seasons at Cronulla, the club missed out on the finals.

At the end of the 2012 NRL season, Cordoba announced his retirement.

On 25 July 2014, Championship side London Broncos took Cordoba out of retirement with a two-year contract.

Cordoba holds a Spanish passport and therefore is not subject to the normal visa restrictions on Australian players heading to the UK.
