= Matt Davis (rugby league) =

English rugby league footballer

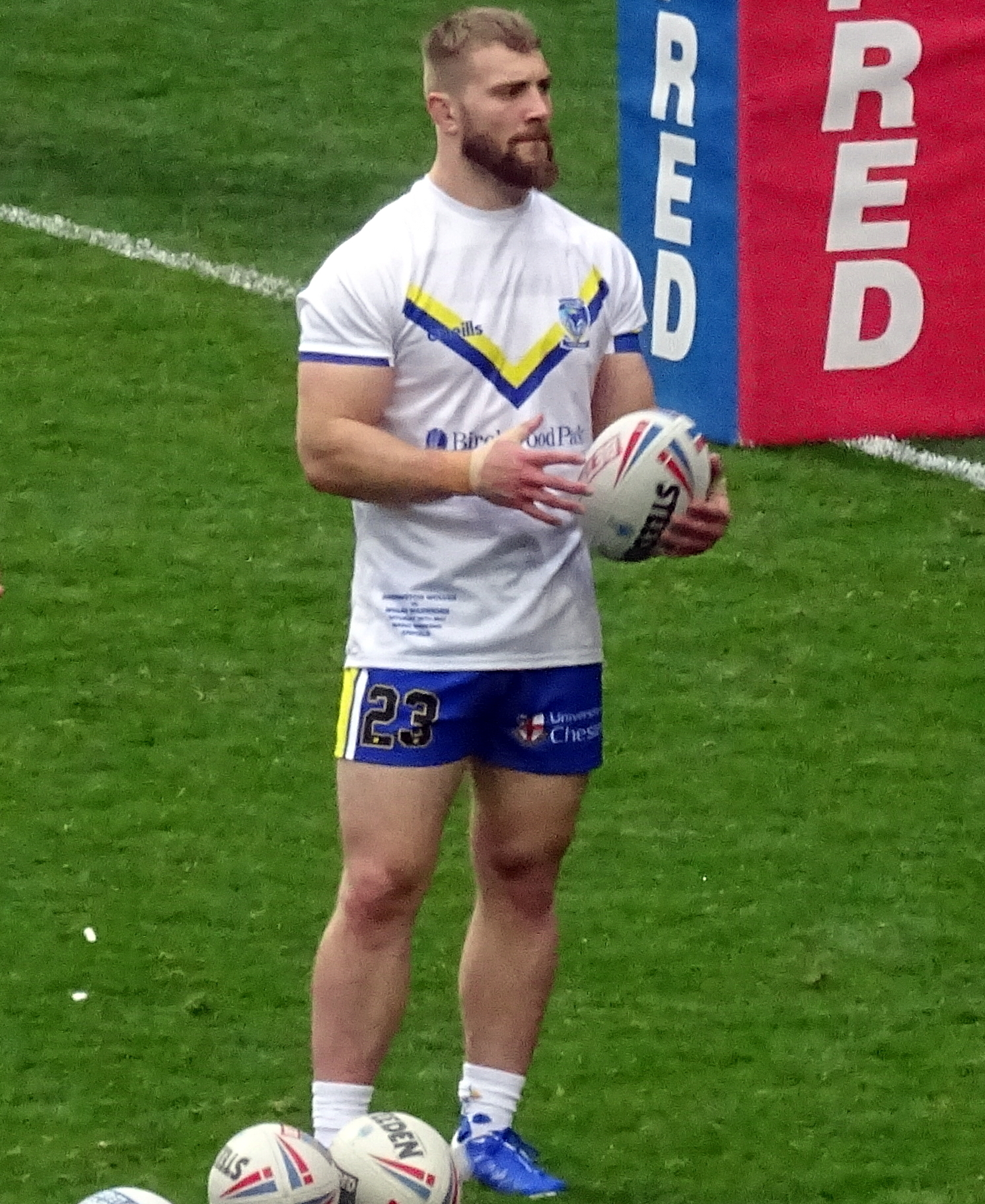

Personal information
- Full name: Matthew Davis
- Born: 5 July 1996 (age 30) Burbage, Leicestershire, England
- Height: 5 ft 10 in (1.78 m)
- Weight: 15 st 2 lb (96 kg)

Playing information
- Position: Loose forward, Second-row, Hooker
Club
Years	Team	Pld	T	G	FG	P
2015–18	London Broncos	68	11	0	0	44
2016(loan)	→ Hemel Stags	1	0	0	0	0
2017(loan)	→ London Skolars	2	0	0	0	0
2019–22	Warrington Wolves	61	5	0	0	20
2019(loan)	→ Rochdale Hornets	3	0	0	0	0
2019(loan)	→ London Broncos	4	0	0	0	0
2023–	Leigh Leopards	101	9	0	0	36
	Total	240	25	0	0	100
- Source: As of 22 August 2026
- Relatives: Sam Davis (brother)

Matt Davis (born 5 July 1996) is an English rugby league footballer who plays as a loose forward or second-row for the Leigh Leopards in the Super League, who whom he won the Challenge Cup in 2023.

He played for the London Broncos in the Championship, and on loan from London at the Hemel Stags and the London Skolars in League 1. He has previously played for the Warrington Wolves in the Super League, and spent time on loan from Warrington at the Rochdale Hornets in the Championship and the Broncos in the Super League.

== Background ==
Matt Davis was born in Burbage, Leicestershire, England.

His younger brother Sam Davis is a hooker who plays for the London Broncos in the Betfred Championship.

== Early career ==
Matt Davis previously played with the Leicester Storm in the Conference League South and featured in the Midlands Regional Academy.

As an amateur for Leicester Storm, he was then selected for the Midlands Academy, before joining the prestigious London Broncos' academy and progressing into the first team in 2015.

He was spotted by Broncos Head of Youth Darren Higgins who picked out both Davis and Ben Gray from the Midlands set up.

In 2015 he was given the chance to move up from the academy at the London Broncos and train with the first team.

== Playing career ==
=== London Broncos ===
Matt Davis made his London Broncos debut as an 18 year old on 23 May 2015 at the Blackpool Summer Bash, in a side which included 35-year-old Head Coach, Andrew Henderson, in what was the best performance of the season, a 46-6 victory over Sheffield Eagles.

Davis signed a full-time contract shortly afterwards and began to feature more regularly but also was made available as a dual registration player and played for Broncos partner clubs' Hemel Stags and the London Skolars who both play in the League 1 competition.

In 2017, the London Broncos finished second in the table, with Davis a first team regular but the Broncos were mediocre in the Qualifiers, beating only Halifax.

In 2018, it seemed that the Broncos might not even make the Qualifiers and it was announced that Davis had signed with the Warrington Wolves in June 2018, for the 2019 and 2020 seasons.

However Broncos suddenly hit form and went on a long winning streak that helped the club finish second, in a league in which just a single point separated 6th from 2nd.

Matt Davis had played every game that season up until and including the 11-8 victory over Salford Red Devils on 22 September 2018.

He was unavailable due to injury for the last game of the Qualifiers against Halifax and Toronto away in the Million Pound Game, but the club won both and were promoted to Super League.

Over 4 seasons at the Broncos, Davis went from being a reserve player for a team that finished in the bottom half of the table in 2015 to the winner of the player's player of the year award.

=== Warrington Wolves ===
In 2019. Davis was at Warrington in the early part of the season and was not given a first team opportunity, instead being dual registered to bottom of the table, Rochdale Hornets.

A loan to London Broncos saw Davis prove his Super League quality and he returned to Warrington as a first team player, making his debut against London.

Davis played in the 2019 Challenge Cup Final victory over St. Helens at Wembley Stadium.

On 16 December 2020, it was announced that Davis had signed a new contract to keep him at Warrington.

=== Leigh ===
On 12 August 2023, Davis played for Leigh in their 2023 Challenge Cup final victory over Hull Kingston Rovers. Davis played 20 matches for Leigh in the 2024 Super League season which saw the club finish fifth in the table.
