= Daniel Harrison (rugby league) =

Australian rugby league footballer (born 1988)

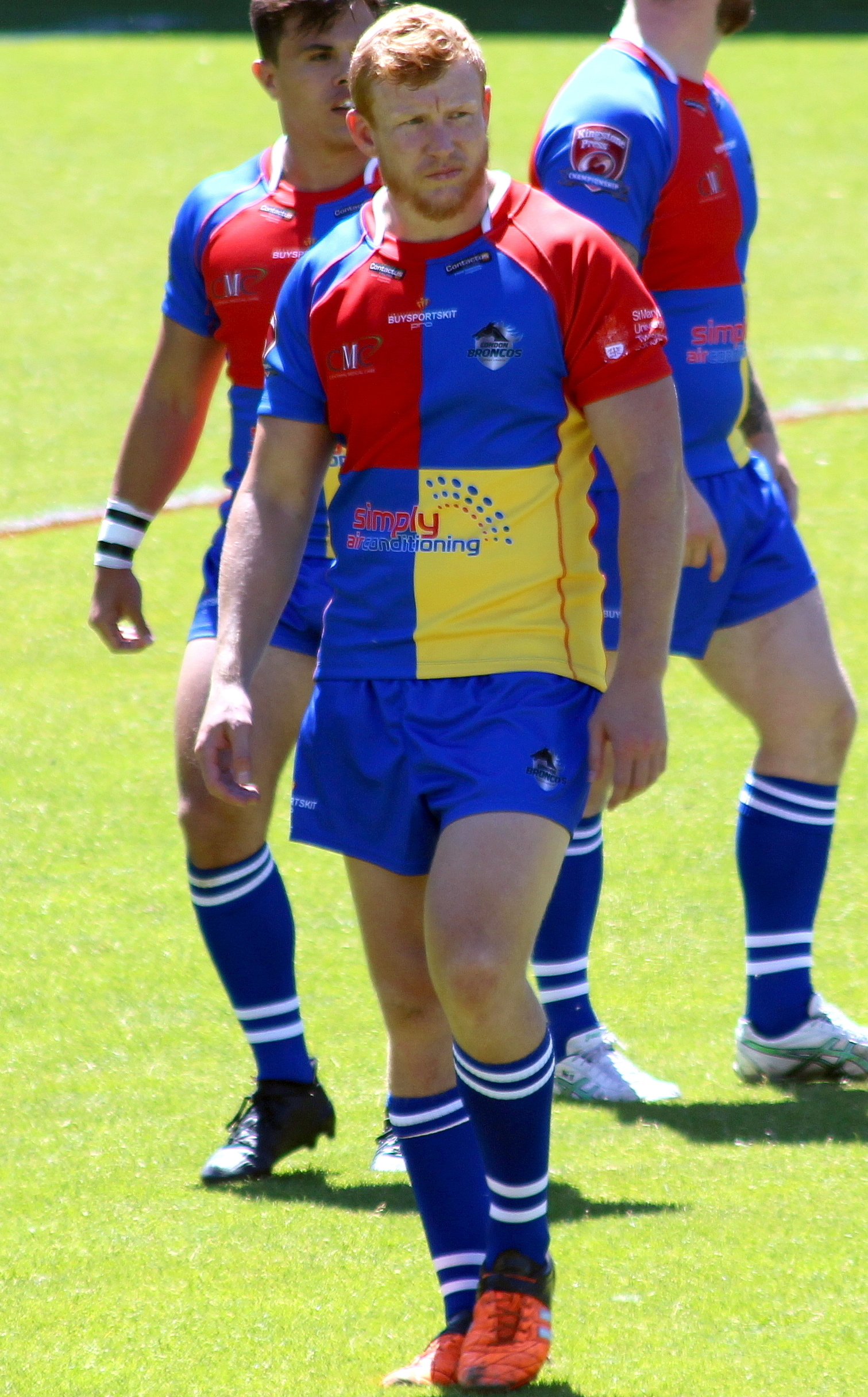

Personal information
- Born: 15 April 1988 (age 38) Gosford, New South Wales, Australia
- Height: 183 cm (6 ft 0 in)
- Weight: 100 kg (15 st 10 lb)

Playing information
- Position: Second-row, Lock
Club
Years	Team	Pld	T	G	FG	P
2011–12	Manly Sea Eagles	19	2	0	0	8
2013	Parramatta Eels	7	0	0	0	0
2014	Manly Sea Eagles	1	0	0	0	0
2015–18	London Broncos	89	27	0	0	92
	Total	116	29	0	0	100
- Source: As of 8 September 2018

Daniel Harrison (born 15 April 1988) is an Australian rugby league footballer who plays for the Hills District Bulls in the Ron Massey Cup. He plays as a second-row or loose forward.

He previously played for the Manly-Warringah Sea Eagles and the Parramatta Eels in the NRL. He also played for the London Broncos in the Championship.

== Rugby league career ==
=== 2011-12: Career with Manly ===
Harrison is a former Manly junior who returned to the club in 2011 after several seasons with Canterbury-Bankstown. He made his debut game in round 2 2011 against the Sydney Roosters, a game the Manly club won 27–16. In 2012, Harrison signed with the Parramatta Eels for two-years until 2014, starting in 2013.

=== 2013-14: Career with Parramatta ===
In June 2013, Harrison was one of 12 Parramatta players that were told that their futures at the club were uncertain by coach, Ricky Stuart. Despite being told that he may need to look for a new club in 2014, Harrison made his debut for Parramatta in Round 15 against the South Sydney Rabbitohs but due to Ricky Stuart leaving he was able to stay. He played seven games for Parramatta in the 2013 NRL season as the club finished last on the table.

In March 2014, Harrison was released by Parramatta. In the wake of the 2016 salary cap scandal, it was revealed that Harrison was still being paid money owed to him by Parramatta even though he left the club two years earlier.

=== 2015-2018: Career with London ===
On 18 July 2014, Championship side London Broncos announced the signing of Harrison on a 2-year deal until the end of 2016.

In 2018, Harrison played in his 100th professional game with the round 1 victory over the Barrow Raiders.

=== Hills District ===
At the start of 2021, it was reported that Harrison had signed a contract with Ron Massey Cup side Hills District Bulls.
