= Ben Pointer =

English rugby league footballer

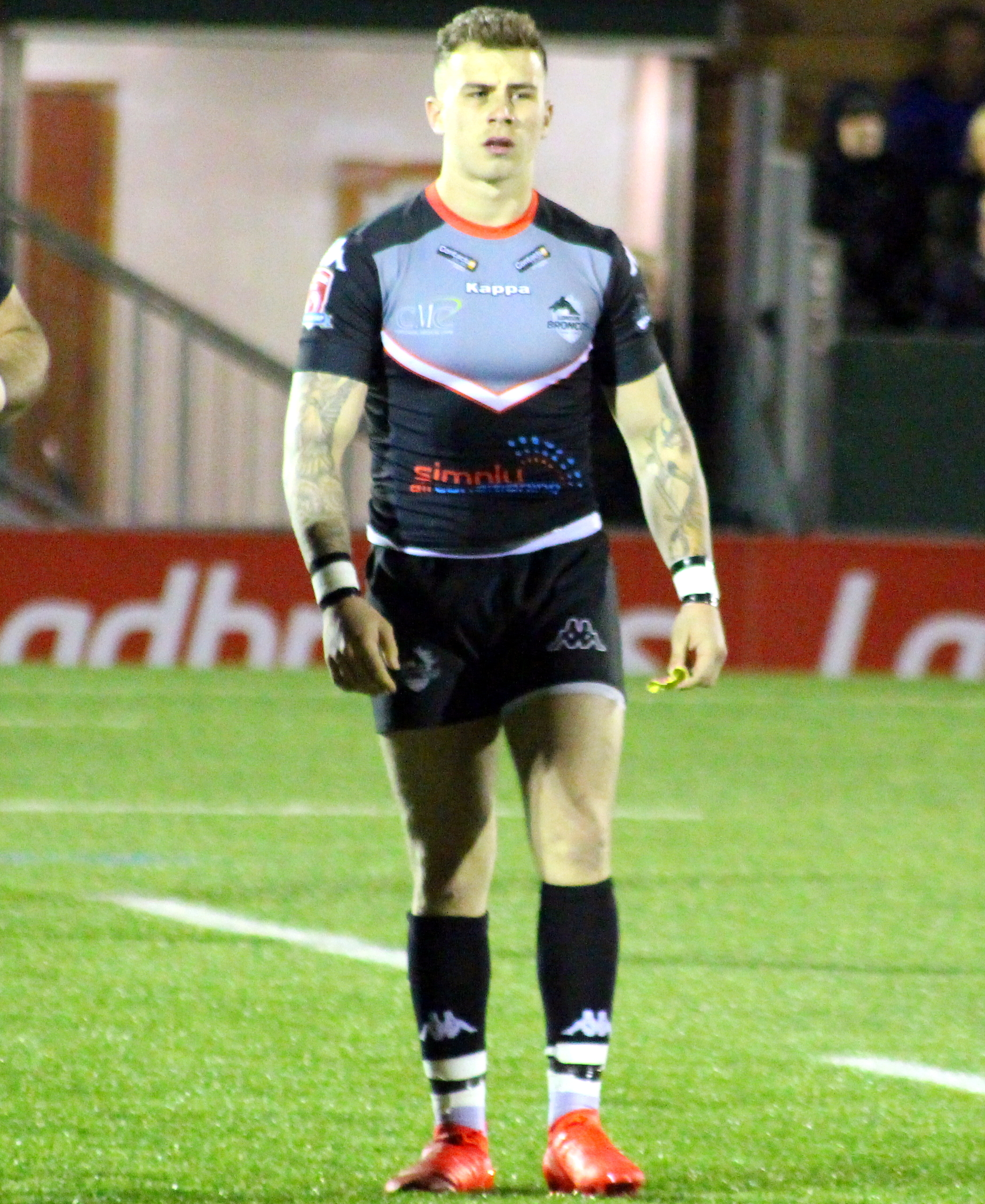

Personal information
- Full name: Benjamin Pointer
- Born: 25 May 1996 (age 29) England
- Height: 5 ft 10 in (1.78 m)
- Weight: 13 st 10 lb (87 kg)

Playing information
- Position: Hooker
Club
Years	Team	Pld	T	G	FG	P
2015–17	London Broncos	9	0	0	0	0
2016(loan)	→ London Skolars	17	3	0	0	12
2017(loan)	→ London Skolars	11	7	0	0	28
2018	Newcastle Thunder	21	7	0	0	28
	Total	58	17	0	0	68
- Source: As of 18 April 2021

Ben Pointer (born 25 May 1996) is an English former professional rugby league footballer who played as a hooker.

== Background ==
Pointer was born in England on 25 May 1996.

== Career ==
=== London Broncos ===
Pointer played for the London Broncos in the Championship.

Pointer has previously spent time on loan at the London Skolars.

=== Newcastle Thunder ===
Ahead of the 2018 season, Pointer joined the Newcastle Thunder after two loan spells with the London Skolars. He played 21 games that year, scoring 7 tries.

=== Sheffield Eagles ===
Following his stint in League 1, he joined Championship side Sheffield Eagles in October 2018. However, he left the club before the season began.

=== Newtown Jets ===
After departing Sheffield Eagles, Pointer moved to Australia where he spent time playing with the Newtown Jets.

=== Coventry Bears ===
On 4 February 2021, it was reported that he had signed for the Coventry Bears in RFL League 1.
