= Wes Naiqama =

Former Fiji international rugby league footballer and coach

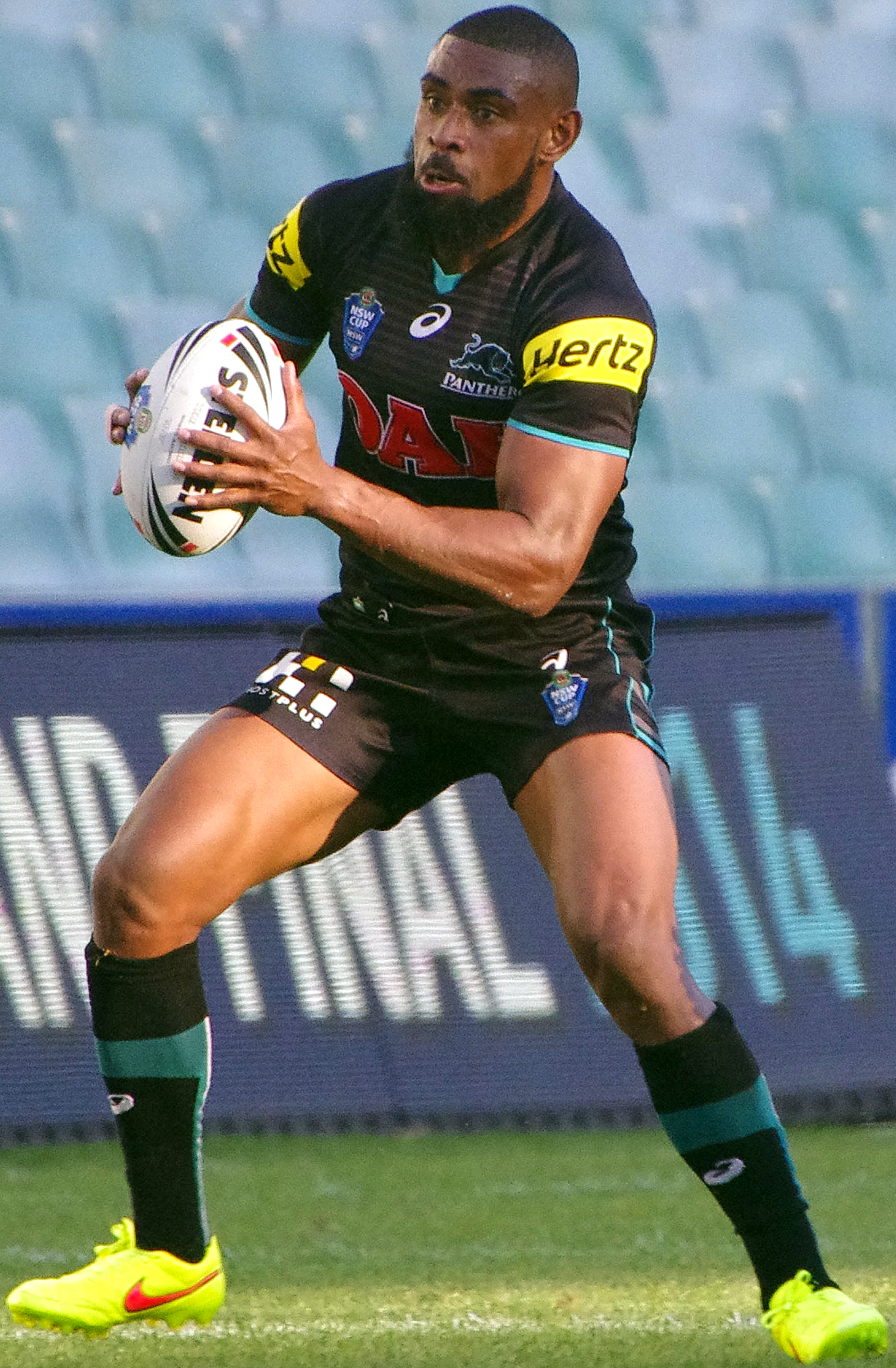

Personal information
- Full name: Waisale Ligani Naiqama
- Born: 19 October 1982 (age 44) Sutherland, New South Wales, Australia

Playing information
- Height: 182 cm (6 ft 0 in)
- Weight: 96 kg (15 st 2 lb)
- Position: Centre, Fullback, Wing
Club
Years	Team	Pld	T	G	FG	P
2005–07	St. George Illawarra	38	16	48	0	160
2008–12	Newcastle Knights	75	15	60	0	180
2013–14	Penrith Panthers	8	2	1	0	10
2015–16	London Broncos	40	12	138	0	324
	Total	161	45	247	0	674
Representative
Years	Team	Pld	T	G	FG	P
2006–14	Fiji	14	7	52	0	132

Coaching information
Club
Years	Team	Gms	W	D	L	W%
2019–	Kaiviti Silktails	0	0	0	0
- Education: James Cook Boys Technology High School
- Relatives: Kevin Naiqama (brother)

Wes Naiqama (born 19 October 1982) is a Fijian Australian former professional rugby league footballer who last played for the London Broncos in the English Championship. He won 14 caps for the Fiji national rugby league team. He primarily played as a centre, fullback and winger, but can also fill in at second-row. He is the older brother of Huddersfield Giants player and fellow Fiji international, Kevin Naiqama.

== Background ==
Naiqama was born in Sutherland, New South Wales, Australia.

== Playing career ==
=== Early career ===
Naiqama played his junior football for the Arncliffe Scots and attended James Cook Boys Technology High School before being signed by the St. George Illawarra Dragons. In 2002, he scored 38 points, 5 tries and 9 goals in a Jersey Flegg game for the St. George club against the North Sydney Bears.

=== St. George Illawarra Dragons ===
In Round 4 of the 2005 NRL season he made his NRL debut for St. George Illawarra against the Canberra Raiders. Naiqama played 20 games for the club in his debut season including their shock preliminary final loss against the Wests Tigers. The following year, he was limited to only nine games but he did feature in the clubs finals campaign which reached the preliminary final stage before they were defeated 24-10 by Melbourne. In his final year at the club, Naiqama was once again limited to only nine appearances.

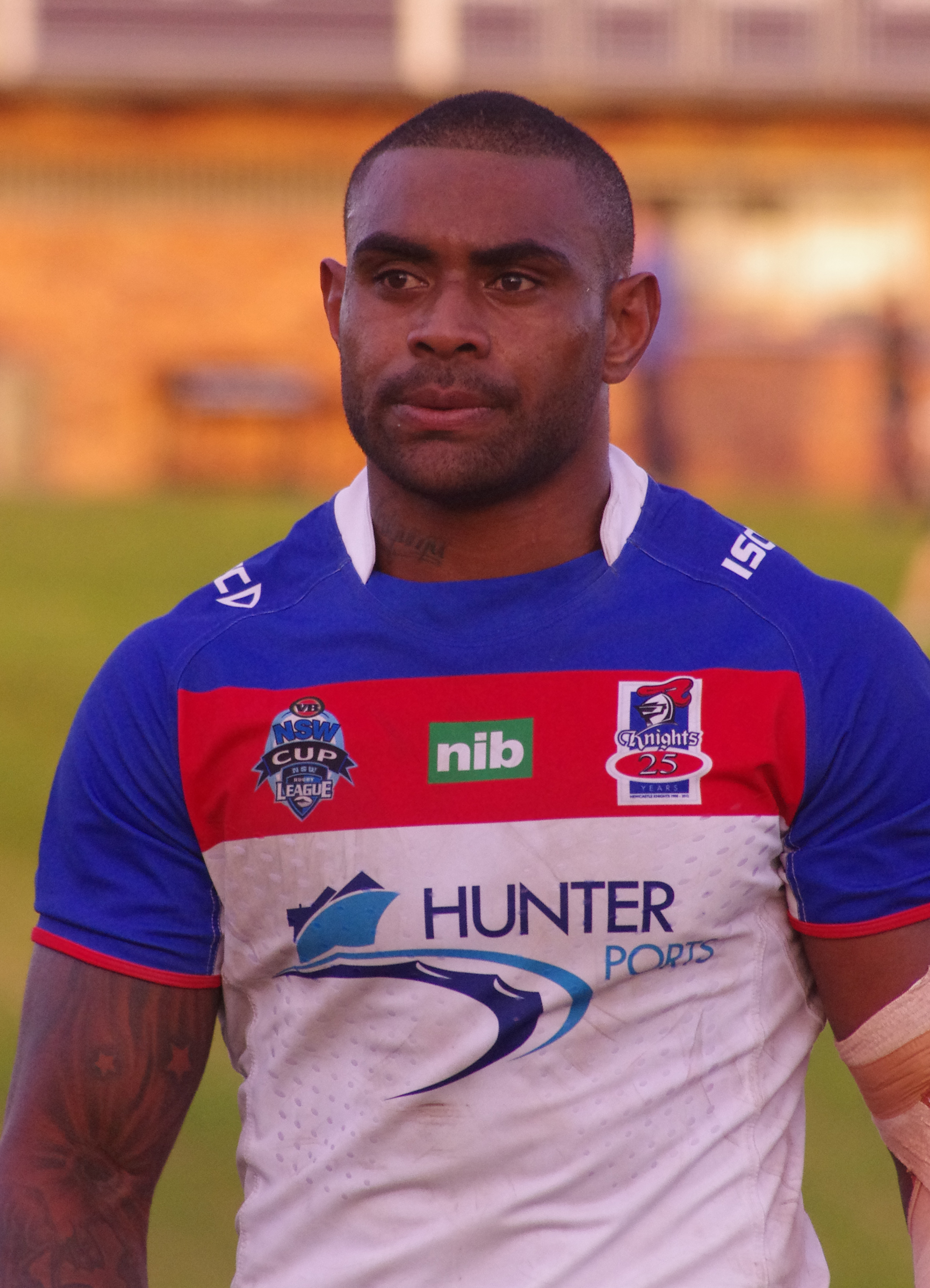
Naiqama in 2012 playing for the Newcastle Knights in the NSW Cup.

=== Newcastle Knights ===
In 2007, Naiqama signed a contract with the Newcastle Knights starting in 2008, to be a part of the new Brian Smith era at the Newcastle outfit. In 2008, Naiqama regularly started in the centres or at fullback. He was also chosen as the replacement goal kicker after Kurt Gidley. He was frequently used as a bench utility player in 2009 and 2010 before gaining his spot back in the starting team in 2011, playing in career best form as a centre or fullback. In Round 16 of the 2011 season, Naiqama got the chance to captain the Newcastle Knights for the first time after captain Kurt Gidley and vice-captain Jarrod Mullen were both injured at the same time. He again was named captain in Round 17. In June 2011, after career best form, Naiqama re-signed with the Newcastle side for three-years after rejecting a contract with his former club, the St. George Illawarra Dragons. In 2012, after injuries and form loss, Naiqama was demoted to the NSW Cup after Round 9 by new head coach Wayne Bennett.

=== Penrith Panthers ===
On 13 July 2012, Naiqama was released from the remaining two years of his contract with the Newcastle Knights and signed a two-year contract with the Penrith Panthers starting in 2013.

=== London Broncos ===
On 27 August 2014, Naiqama signed a two-year contract with the London Broncos in the 2015 Kingstone Press Championship. On 21 December 2015, Naiqama became the captain of London Broncos.

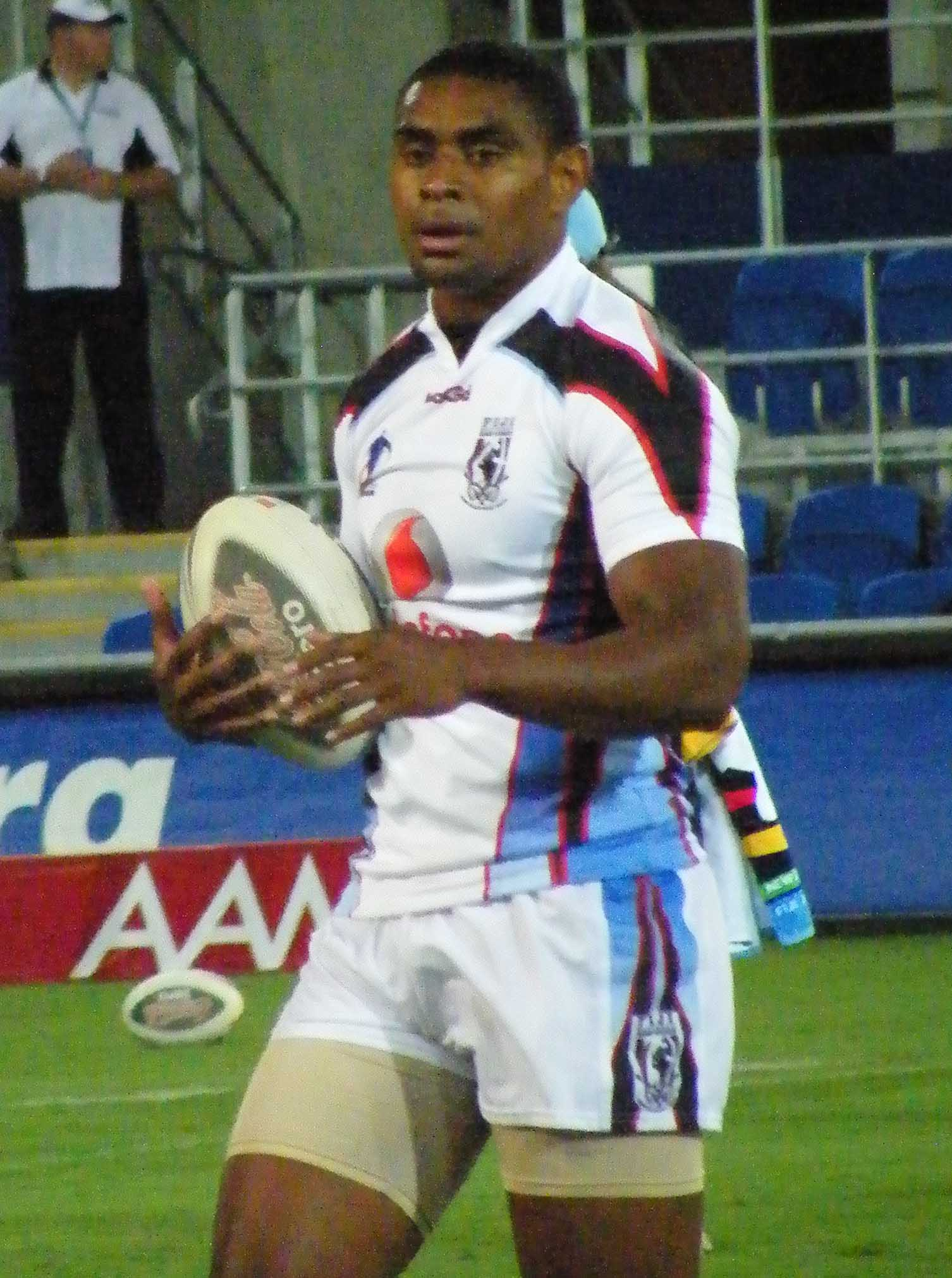
Naiqama playing for Fiji in 2008

== Representative career ==
Naiqama made his Fiji debut in 2006. In 2008, Naiqama was named in the Fiji squad for the 2008 Rugby League World Cup.

On 3 November 2011, the annual RLIF Awards dinner was held at the Tower of London and Naiqama was named Fiji's Player of the Year.

He was named vice-captain for Fiji's 2013 Rugby League World Cup campaign.

In October 2014, Naiqama captained Fiji in their Hayne/Mannah Cup test match against Lebanon.

== Personal life ==
In December 2006, Naiqama was arrested but not charged over an alleged assault in Sydney's King Cross.

His relationship with Australian/Fijian pop star Paulini Curuenavuli ended in 2006 with domestic violence speculations, and the singer has admitted to writing a song about the situation and abuse.

On 28 February 2007, Naiqama was convicted by a Sydney court for driving a car while his license was disqualified. The court sentenced Naiqama to serve a maximum of eight months periodic detention, with a non-parole period of four months. This was the fourth time Naiqama had been convicted of such an offence.
