= Matt Garside =

English rugby league footballer

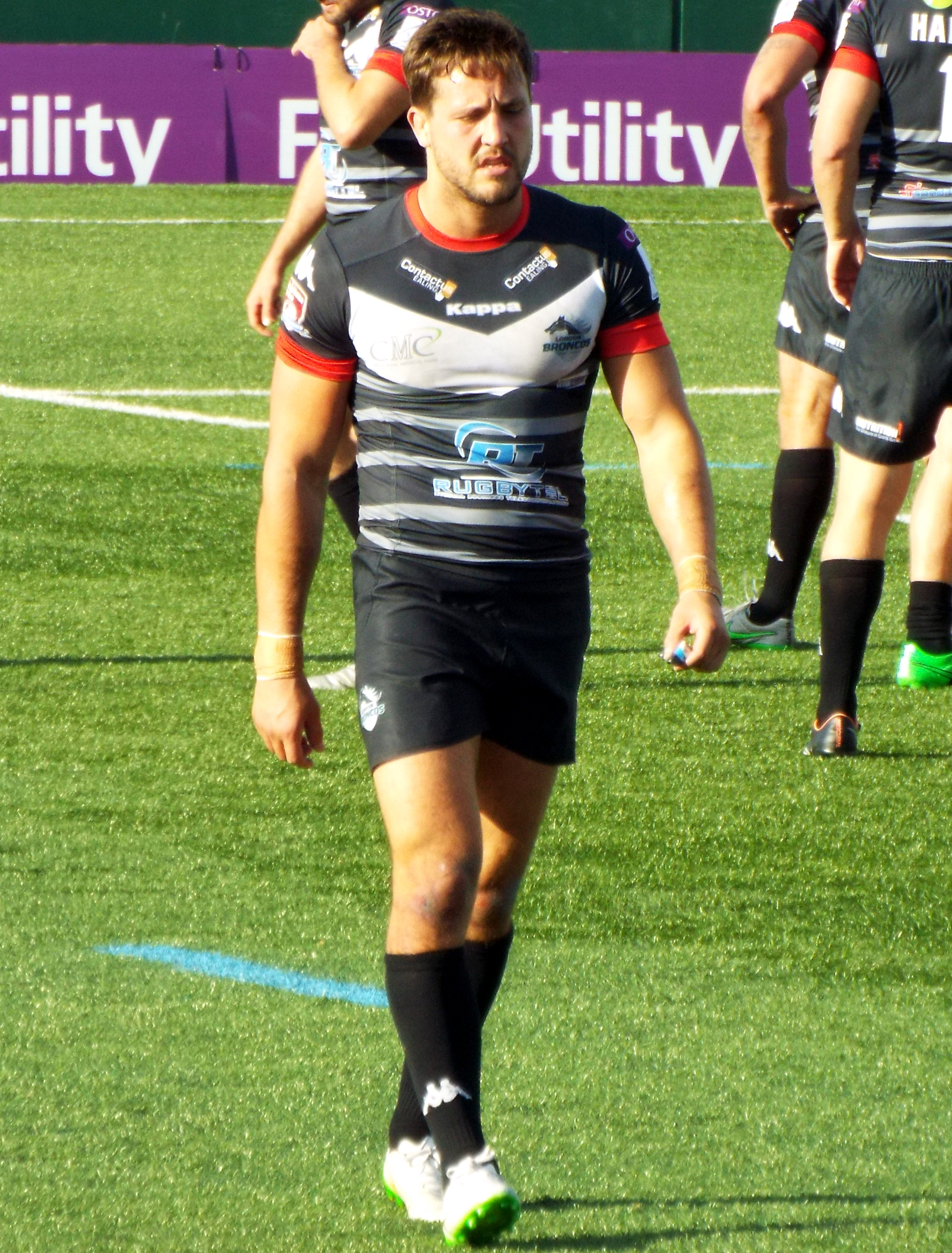

Personal information
- Full name: Matthew Garside
- Born: 1 October 1990 (age 35)
- Height: 6 ft 1 in (1.85 m)
- Weight: 15 st 4 lb (97 kg)

Playing information
- Position: Second-row, Centre, Loose forward
Club
Years	Team	Pld	T	G	FG	P
2010	Gateshead Thunder	12	4	0	0	16
2011–12	York City Knights	46	16	0	0	64
2013–14	Sheffield Eagles	55	22	0	0	88
2015–17	London Broncos	77	23	0	0	92
2018–19	Bradford Bulls	40	11	0	0	44
2020–22	Halifax	14	3	0	0	12
2022(loan)	→ Dewsbury Rams	2	0	0	0	0
2023–25	Dewsbury Rams	19	3	0	0	12
	Total	265	82	0	0	328
- Source: As of 28 January 2024

Matt Garside is a former English professional rugby league player who played as a second-row forward and centre. He is the assistant coach of Dewsbury Rams in the RFL Championship.

He previously played for the Gateshead Thunder in Championship 1, and the York City Knights, Sheffield Eagles and the London Broncos in the Championship. Garside also played for the Bradford Bulls in League 1.

== Playing career ==
=== Gateshead Thunder ===
In 2010, Garside played for Gateshead Thunder making 12 appearances and scoring four tries.

=== York City Knights ===
During 2011 and 2012, Matt Garside played for York City making 46 appearances and scoring 16 tries.

=== Sheffield Eagles ===
on 6 September 2012, Sheffield announced the signing of Garside from the 2013 Championship season onwards. Garside played a large part of Sheffield's Grand Final winning season scoring 9 tries in 27 games with impressive performances.

=== London Broncos ===
On 2 September 2014 relegated Super League side, London Broncos, announced the signing of Garside on a two-year full-time contract. This is his first full-time contract. Commenting on it (extract from reference), "I'm really excited to be joining the club and starting the hard work to take us into a strong Championship season. It's a massive move for me and I am really happy that I have been given the opportunity to move down to London and become a full-time athlete."

=== Bradford Bulls ===
In September 2017 his contract ran out at London so he signed for Bradford on a two-year deal.

=== Halifax Panthers ===
In 2020, Garside signed a contract to join Halifax Panthers.

=== Dewsbury Rams ===
Garside joined Dewsbury in 2022 on loan from Halifax and made the move permanent in 2023. At the end of 2024 Garside was appointed assistant coach for the 2025 season.
