= Jon Magrin =

Malta & Jamaica international rugby league footballer

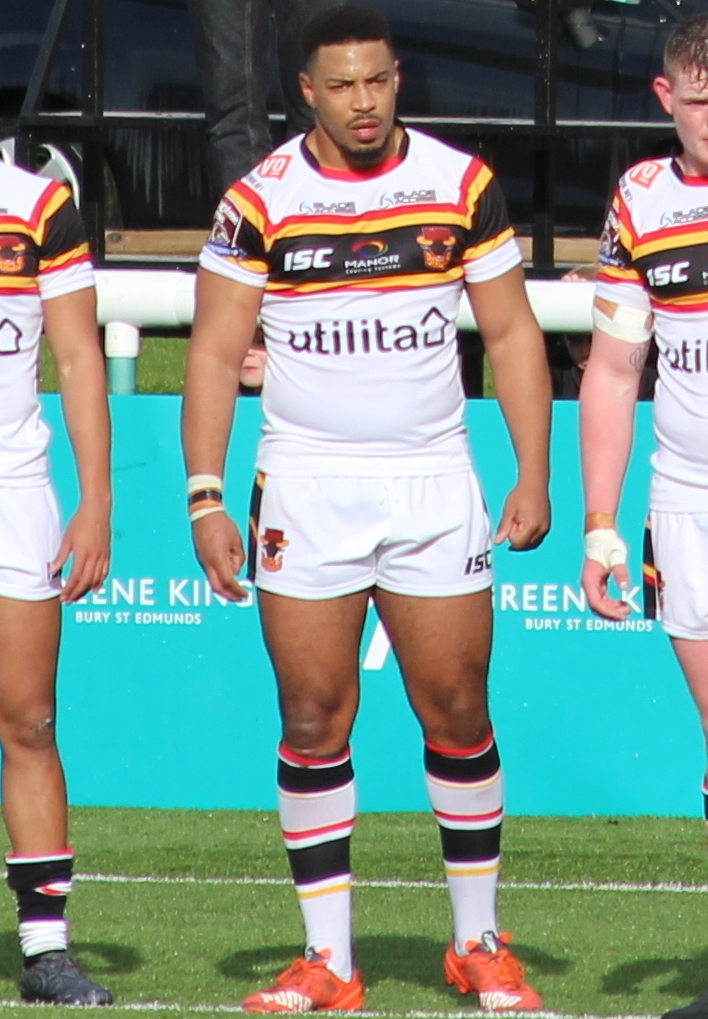

Personal information
- Full name: Jonathan Magrin
- Born: Jonathan Wallace; 8 October 1994 (age 32) Pieta, Malta
- Height: 5 ft 11 in (1.80 m)
- Weight: 16 st 7 lb (105 kg)

Playing information
- Position: Prop
Club
Years	Team	Pld	T	G	FG	P
2014–16	London Broncos	60	2	0	0	8
2015(loan)	→ London Skolars	1	1	0	0	4
2016(loan)	→ London Skolars	3	1	0	0	4
2017	Bradford Bulls	25	2	0	0	8
2018	Sheffield Eagles	29	2	0	0	8
2019	Bradford Bulls	8	0	0	0	0
2019(loan)	→ London Skolars	4	0	0	0	0
2020–	Dewsbury Rams	22	2	0	0	8
	Total	152	10	0	0	40
Representative
Years	Team	Pld	T	G	FG	P
2012	Malta	1	1	0	0	4
2017–	Jamaica	3	1	0	0	4
- Source: As of 4 January 2021

Jon "Jimmy" Magrin (formerly known as Wallace; born 8 October 1994) is a professional rugby league footballer who plays as a prop for the Dewsbury Rams in the Betfred Championship. He has played for both Malta and Jamaica at international level.

He played for the London Broncos in the Super League and the Championship, and spent time on loan from the Broncos at the London Skolars in League 1. He also played for the Bradford Bulls in two separate spells in the Championship, spending time on loan from Bradford at the Skolars in the third tier.

== Background ==
Jonathan Wallace was born in Pieta, Malta.

== London Broncos ==
Magrin made his début for the London Broncos in the Super League against the Wigan Warriors in 2014. Also, for two seasons he spent time on loan at the London Skolars. Magrin went on to play 60 games for the Broncos during his three years there.

== Bradford Bulls ==
Jon Magrin signed for the Bradford Bulls. On 3 January 2017, Bradford Bulls were placed into liquidation by administrators and the contracts of players and staff were terminated. However Magrin re-signed with the new club for the 2017 Season.

Magrin featured in pre-season friendlies against Huddersfield Giants and Keighley Cougars.

Jon featured in the first 17 games that season and went on to play a further two games in the regular season. He featured in the Championship Shield games against the Sheffield Eagles and Rochdale Hornets. He scored twice against Dewsbury, but failed to get himself on the score sheet in any other appearances.

== Sheffield Eagles ==
Magrin joined the Sheffield Eagles on a 1 year deal in November 2017. He was the Eagles' fourth permanent signed ahead of the 2018 season.

He featured in the pre-season friendly against Bradford Bulls and made his competitive début against the Dewsbury Rams.

== Return to Bradford ==
Magrin returned to his old club when they were promoted back to the Championship in 2018.

== International career ==
Magrin made his representative début for Malta in 2012.

In 2017, he also played for Jamaica in their test match against France.
