= Toby Everett =

English rugby league footballer

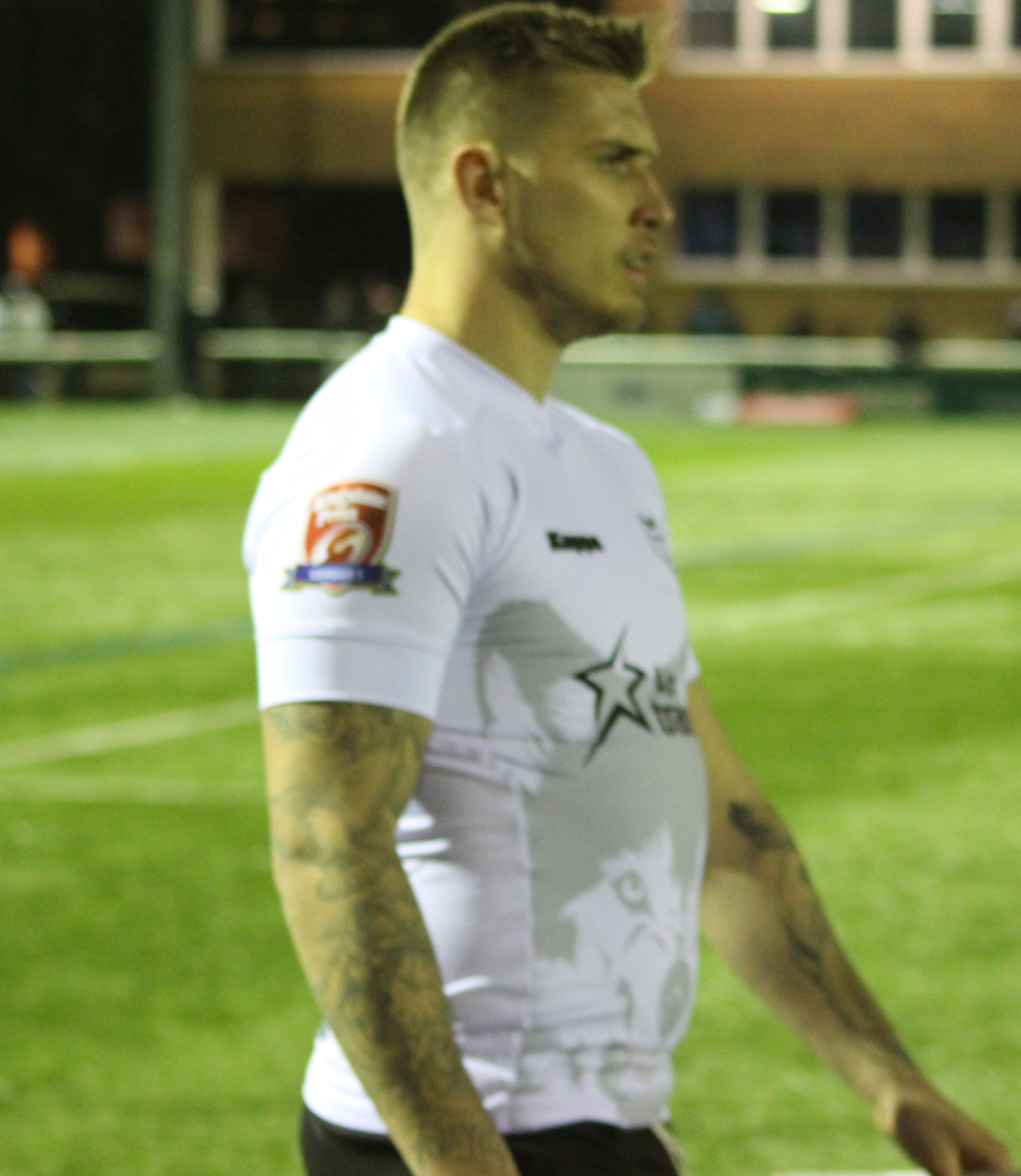

Personal information
- Full name: Toby Joe Everett
- Born: 22 December 1995 (age 30) Farnborough, Kent, England
- Height: 6 ft 3 in (1.90 m)
- Weight: 17 st 0 lb (108 kg)

Playing information
- Position: Prop, Loose forward, Second-row
Club
Years	Team	Pld	T	G	FG	P
2014–17	London Broncos	23	0	0	0	0
2016(loan)	→ London Skolars	17	1	0	0	4
2016(loan)	→ Hemel Stags	1	1	0	0	4
2017(loan)	→ Toronto Wolfpack	3	0	0	0	0
2017–18	Dewsbury Rams	36	1	0	0	4
2019–22	Batley Bulldogs	55	2	0	0	8
2022–23	Keighley Cougars	14	5	0	0	20
2024	Hunslet	8	0	0	0	0
2025–26	Dewsbury Rams
	Total	157	10	0	0	40
- Source: As of 23 November 2024

Toby Joe Everett (born 22 December 1995) is a former English professional rugby league footballer who plays as a prop or loose forward.

He has previously played for the London Broncos in the Super League and the RFL Championship. Everett spent time on loan from the Broncos at the London Skolars, Hemel Stags and the Toronto Wolfpack in League 1. He has also played for the Dewsbury Rams and the Batley Bulldogs in the Championship, and for the Keighley Cougars in League One and the Championship.

== Background ==
Everett was born in Farnborough, Kent, England.

== Career ==
=== London Broncos ===
Everett signed for the London Broncos in 2014 and made 22 appearances in 2014 and 2015. The following season he spent most of the season on loan at London Skolars and Hemel Stags.

=== Toronto Wolfpack ===
Signing for the Toronto Wolfpack for 2017 he only made three appearances due to rehabilitation for an injury.

=== Dewsbury Rams ===
A move to the Dewsbury Rams part way through 2017 saw him make 36 appearances for the Rams before a move to neighbours Batley Bulldogs at the end of the 2018 season.

=== Keighley Cougars ===
The following three seasons saw Everett play 55 games for Batley but finding game time harder to come by in the 2022 season, he joined League 1 side Keighley Cougars on loan and played 14 matches for Keighley as they won the League 1 title. At the end of 2022 he signed a permanent contract with the Cougars.

=== Hunslet RLFC ===
In October 2023 he signed for Hunslet RLFC in League 1.
