= William Barthau =

France international rugby league footballer

Will Barthau
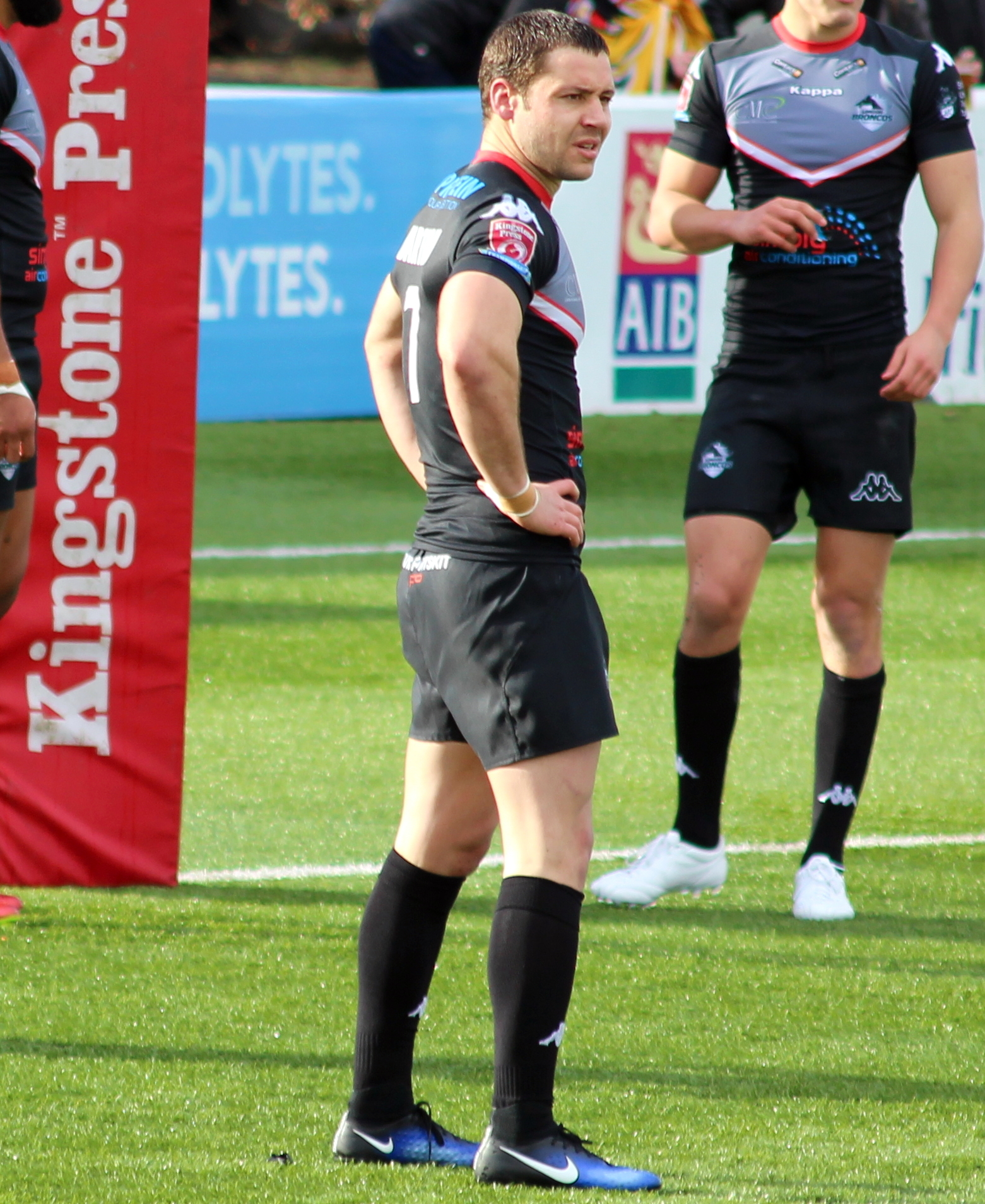

Personal information
- Full name: William Barthau
- Born: 30 January 1990 (age 35); Villeneuve-sur-Lot, Aquitaine, France

Playing information
- Height: 5 ft 10 in (1.78 m)
- Weight: 13 st 1 lb (83 kg)
- Position: Scrum-half
Club
| Years | Team | Pld | T | G | FG | P |
|---|---|---|---|---|---|---|
| 2010–14 | Catalans Dragons | 19 | 6 | 22 | 0 | 68 |
| 2010(Loan) | → Toulouse Olympique | 1 | 0 | 0 | 0 | 0 |
| 2011(Loan) | → Dewsbury Rams | 6 | 0 | 0 | 0 | 0 |
| 2015–17 | London Broncos | 54 | 27 | 23 | 0 | 154 |
| 2018–20 | Toulouse Olympique | 50 | 20 | 1 | 0 | 63 |
| | Total | 130 | 53 | 46 | 0 | 285 |
Representative
| Years | Team | Pld | T | G | FG | P |
| 2009–20 | France | 12 | 0 | 1 | 1 | 3 |

William Barthau is a French retired international rugby league footballer who most recently played as a scrum-half for Toulouse Olympique in the Championship and the French national side.

== Background ==
Barthau was born in Villeneuve-sur-Lot, Aquitaine, France.

== Career ==
=== Catalans Dragons ===
He was a trainee at the Dragons since the start of the 2009 season, and signed part-time in July 2009. In 2010 he signed his first professional contract. He was handed the number 16 jersey for 2010. Despite only being promoted to the Catalans first-team squad in 2010, he played for the French national side at international level; coming off the bench against England in June 2009.

He represented France in the 2010 European Cup and was named in the French squad for the 2013 Rugby League World Cup, he managed to kick the winning field goal against the Mal Meninga coached Papua New Guinea national side 9–8.

On 14 August 2014, Championship side London Broncos announced the signing of Barthau on a 2-year deal until the end of 2016.

=== Toulouse Olympique ===
Toulouse announced his decision to retire with immediate effect on 12 August 2020.

== International ==
He was named in the France 23 man squad for the 2014 European Championship against Wales, Ireland and Scotland.

After missing France's first match of the 2015 European Cup and test-match with England due to injury, William returned to play for France in their European Cup match against Wales.

Barthau played in France's lone international fixture of 2016, an end of year test match against England in Avignon.
