= Rhys Williams (rugby league) =

Wales international rugby league footballer

Rhys "Drags" Williams
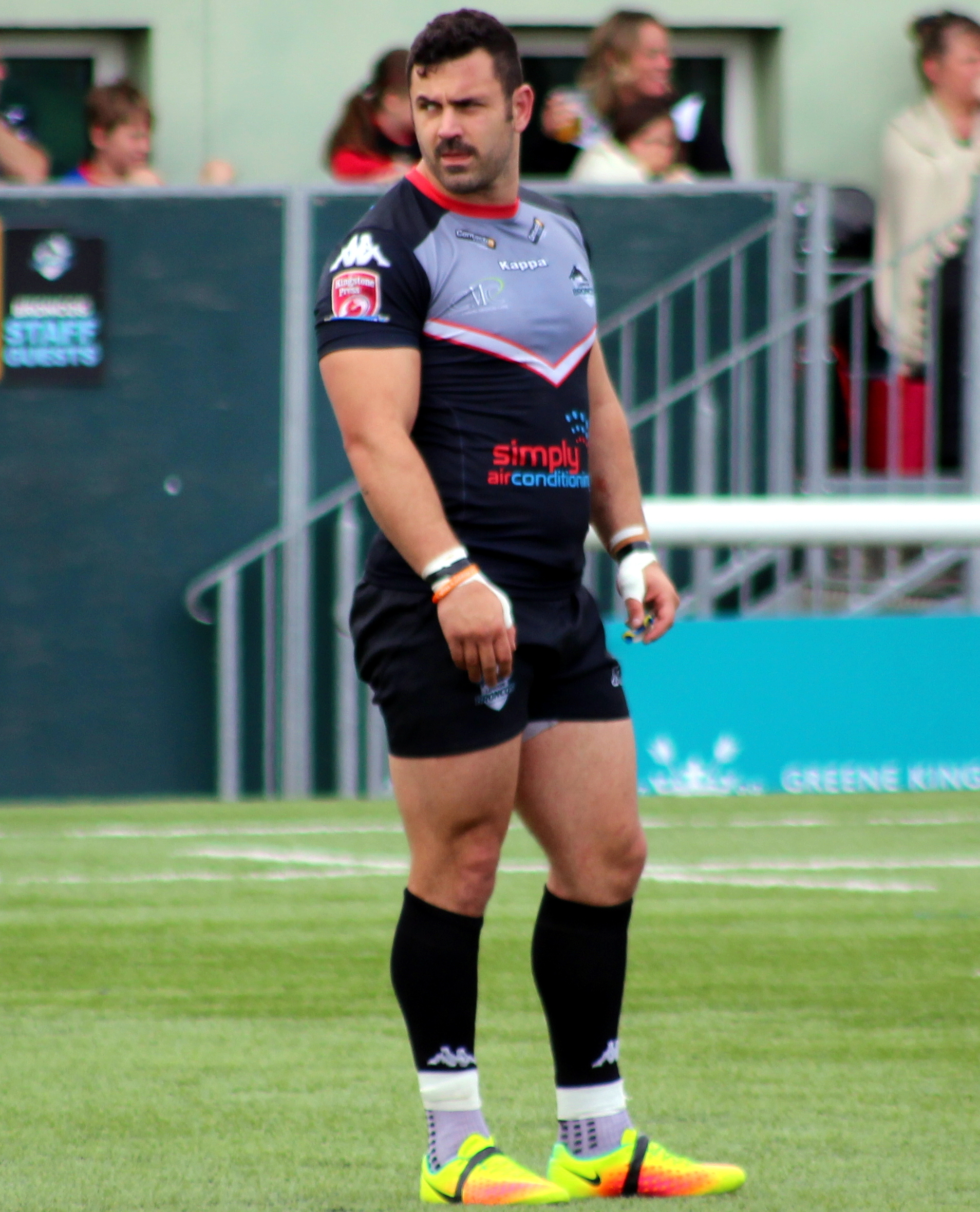

Personal information
- Full name: Rhys Williams
- Born: 8 December 1989 (age 36) Mynydd Isa, Flintshire, Wales
- Height: 5 ft 10 in (1.78 m)
- Weight: 15 st 8 lb (99 kg)

Playing information
- Position: Wing, Centre
Club
Years	Team	Pld	T	G	FG	P
2010–13	Warrington Wolves	29	21	0	0	84
2011(loan)	→ Crusaders RL	10	6	0	0	24
2012(loan)	→ Castleford Tigers	8	4	0	0	16
2013(loan)	→ Salford City Reds	4	0	0	0	0
2013(loan)	→ Swinton Lions	16	9	0	0	36
2014	Central Qld Capras	24	11	0	0	32
2015–19	London Broncos	154	100	0	0	400
2020–23	Salford Red Devils	55	18	0	0	72
2024	Swinton Lions	33	18	0	0	72
2025	Widnes Vikings	16	12	0	0	48
	Total	349	199	0	0	784
Representative
Years	Team	Pld	T	G	FG	P
2008–25	Wales	37	25	0	0	100
- Source: As of 6 May 2026

Rhys Williams (born 8 December 1989) is a Welsh former professional rugby league footballer who played as a winger.

His professional playing career began in 2010 with Warrington Wolves in the Super League, which included various loans to Crusaders RL, Castleford, Salford, and the Swinton. In 2014, he moved to Central Queensland Capras in the Queensland Cup, before a return to the UK the following year playing for London Broncos mostly in the Championship and one season in the Super League. In 2020, he moved to Salford Red Devils for four further seasons in the Super League. He finished his career with a season at Swinton Lions, then a season at Widnes Vikings, both in the Championship.

Internationally, Williams played for Wales at four World Cups in 2013, 2017, 2022, and the Nines world cup in 2019. He finished his representative career with 38 caps and 24 tries, and at the time of his retirement was Wales's most capped player.

== Club career ==
=== Youth ===
Williams began his rugby career in rugby union playing for Mold RFC and the Scarlets academy before switching to rugby league at age 18.

=== Warrington ===
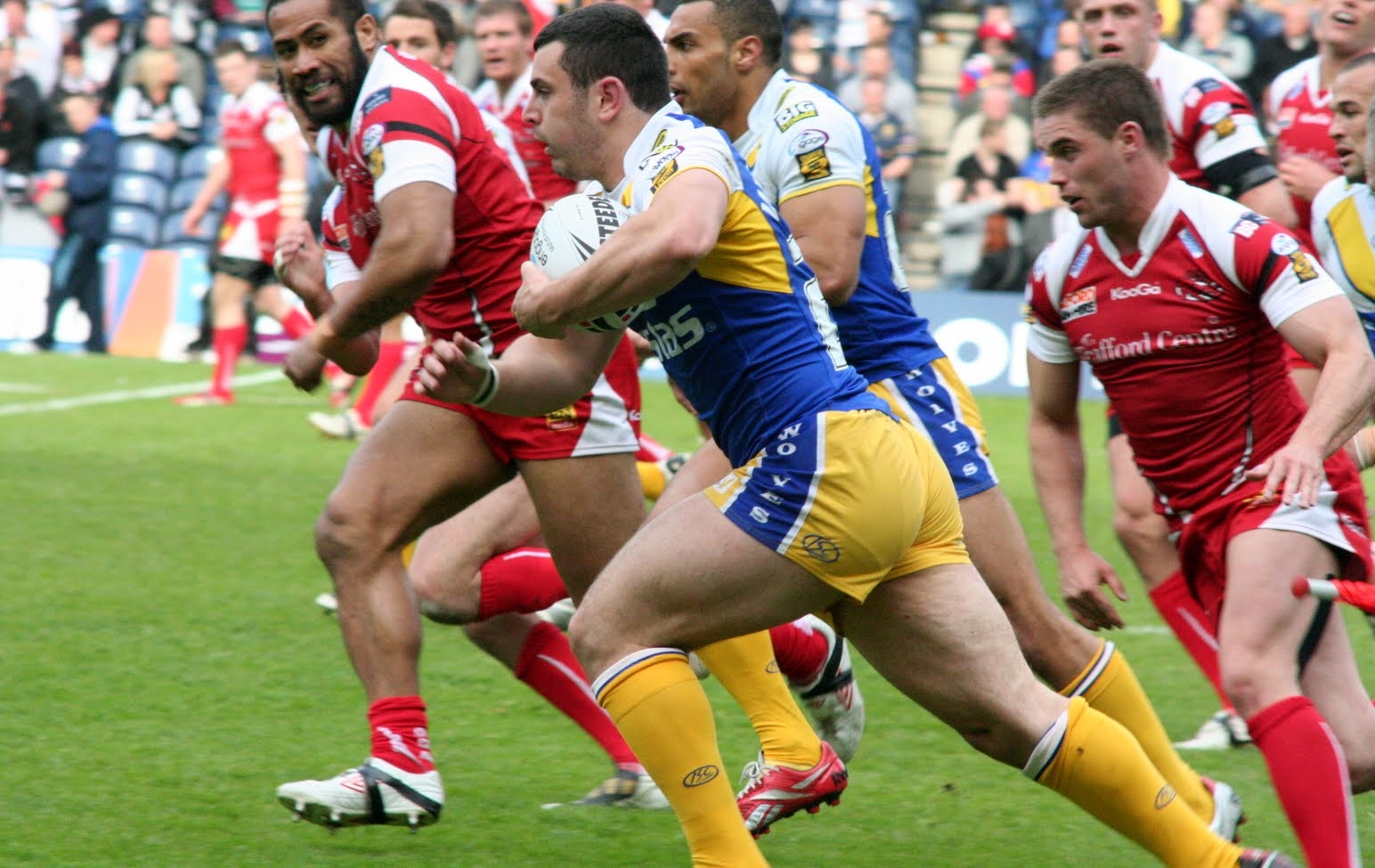
Williams playing for the Warrington Wolves in 2013

Williams scored his first try for Warrington in the 68–16 win over Salford at Murrayfield on 1 May 2010 at Magic Weekend in Edinburgh.

==== Crusaders RL (loan) ====
At the beginning of the 2011 season, signed for Crusaders on loan. He scored his first try for the club against Salford at the Millennium Stadium on 13 February 2011 at Magic Weekend in Cardiff. After 6 games with the Welsh club, he was recalled to Warrington.

==== Castleford (loan) ====
Williams spent 2012 on loan at Castleford.

==== Salford (loan) ====
Williams went on loan to the Salford club in 2013.

=== Central Queensland Capras ===
In 2014, Rhys joined the Central Queensland Capras in the Queensland Cup.

=== London Broncos ===
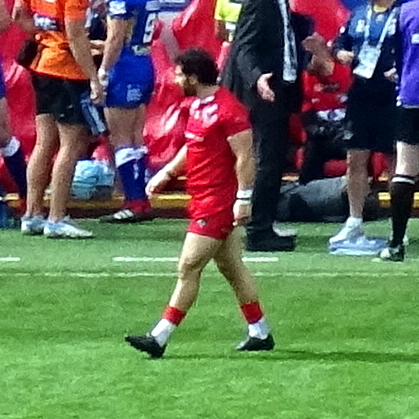
Williams playing for the London Broncos in 2019

In August 2014, Williams signed with a Championship club London Broncos,a contract which would cone into effect in 2015.

Williams left London having scored 100 tries for the club in 152 games.

=== Salford ===
In October 2019, Williams signed a contract to join Super League side Salford.

On 17 October 2020, he played in the 2020 Challenge Cup Final defeat for Salford against Leeds at Wembley Stadium in which he scored a try running the full length of the field.

=== Swinton Lions ===
On 27 October 2023 Williams joined Swinton Lions for 2024 on a 2-year deal. In February 2020, Williams scored his 200th career try.

=== Widnes Vikings ===
On 21 January 2025 joined Widnes Vikings in the RFL Championship.

In September 2025, Williams announced he would be retiring as a player following the end of the season.

== International career ==
Williams was named in Wales team to face England at the Keepmoat Stadium, Doncaster prior to England's departure for the 2008 Rugby League World Cup. He has subsequently earned a further 9 caps for Wales, including several games during the 2010 Alitalia European Cup. During that tournament Williams scored a hat-trick of tries against Scotland.

Having won the European Cup, Wales earned a spot in the 2011 Rugby League Four Nations. Again, Williams was named in the Welsh squad for the end of season tournament, and played for Wales in every match, scoring a try against Australia.

In 2012, two tries in a fixture against France saw Williams overtake Iestyn Harris to become Wales' all-time leading try scorer.

He played again for Wales in the 2013 Rugby League World Cup.

In October 2014, Williams played in the 2014 European Cup. He scored a try in the opening game against Scotland.

In October and November 2015, Williams played in the 2015 European Cup.

In October 2016, Williams played in the 2017 World Cup qualifiers, scoring two tries in the country's opening game against Serbia.

He was selected in the Wales 9s squad for the 2019 Rugby League World Cup 9s.

In June 2022, Williams became Wales's most capped player in the mid-season test match against France. Later that year he was selected to play at the postponed 2021 World Cup held in October and November 2022.

Williams retired from club and country in September 2025. At the time of his retirement, he is the most capped player for Wales with 38 caps and scored 24 tries. Williams initially announced his retirement for after the conclusion of the 2025 season, and with that hoped to play for Wales in their end-of-season test series against Ireland. However, head coach Paul Berry opted not to select Williams for the squad, and controversially informed of this decision via voicemail. In the days followings this news story, Wales Rugby League Chief Executive Richard Hibbard, defended his national team's head coach selection decision, stating "no player is guaranteed a place based on past achievements" and criticised Williams along with other senior players for poor professionalism in regards to "first concerns focused on compensation". Williams responded to this by stating the intent was to ensure him and the other part time players from semi-professional clubs did not end up out of pocket by playing for their country.

== Personal life ==
Upon his permanent switch to part time rugby, Williams began work as a PE teacher.

Williams supports Manchester United and Wrexham.
