= 2023 London Broncos season =

44th London Broncos season

- 2023 Championship Rank: 5th
- Play-off result: Promoted as Grand Final Winners
- Challenge Cup: 6th round
- 1895 Cup: Semi-final
- 2023 record: Wins: 22; draws: 0; losses: 12
- Points scored: For: 838; against: 668

Team information
- Chairman: David Hughes
- Head Coach: Mike Eccles
- Captain: Will Lovell
- Stadium: Plough Lane
- Avg. attendance: 1849
- High attendance: 1849

Top scorers
- Tries: Iliess Macani - 21
- Goals: Oli Leyland - 78
- Points: Oli Leyland - 188
Home colours	Away colours
← 2022	List of seasons	2024 →

The 2023 London Broncos season is the 44th year in the club's history, the fourth consecutive season out of the Super League and their second season at Plough Lane as tenants of AFC Wimbledon. They were coached by Director of Rugby Mike Eccles. The Broncos competed in both the 2023 Betfred Championship and the 2023 Challenge Cup. They were promoted to the Super League from the 2024 season as winners of the 2023 Championship Grand Final.

== 2023 squad ==
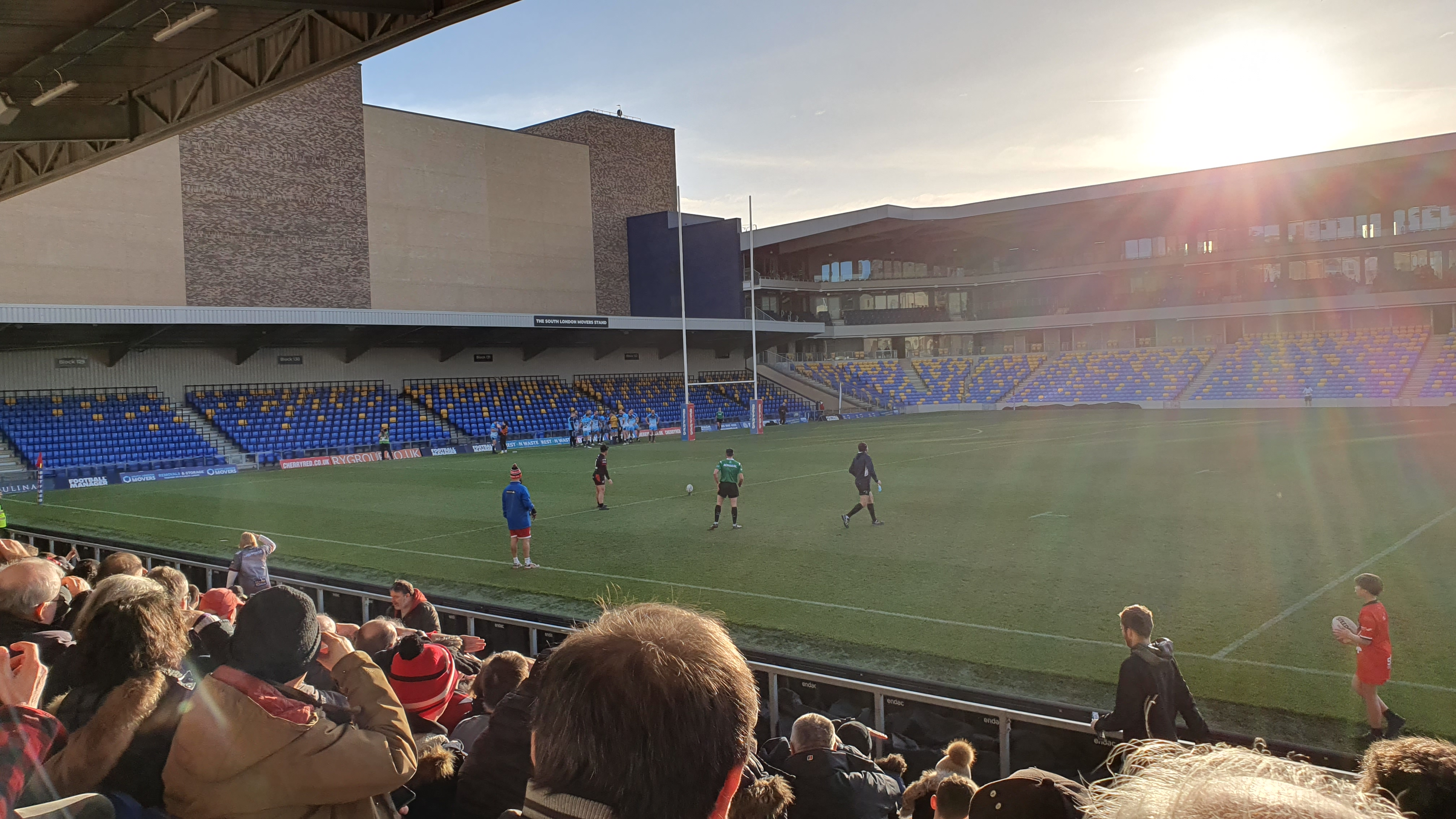
Oli Leyland aiming a kick at goal for the London Broncos in February 2023

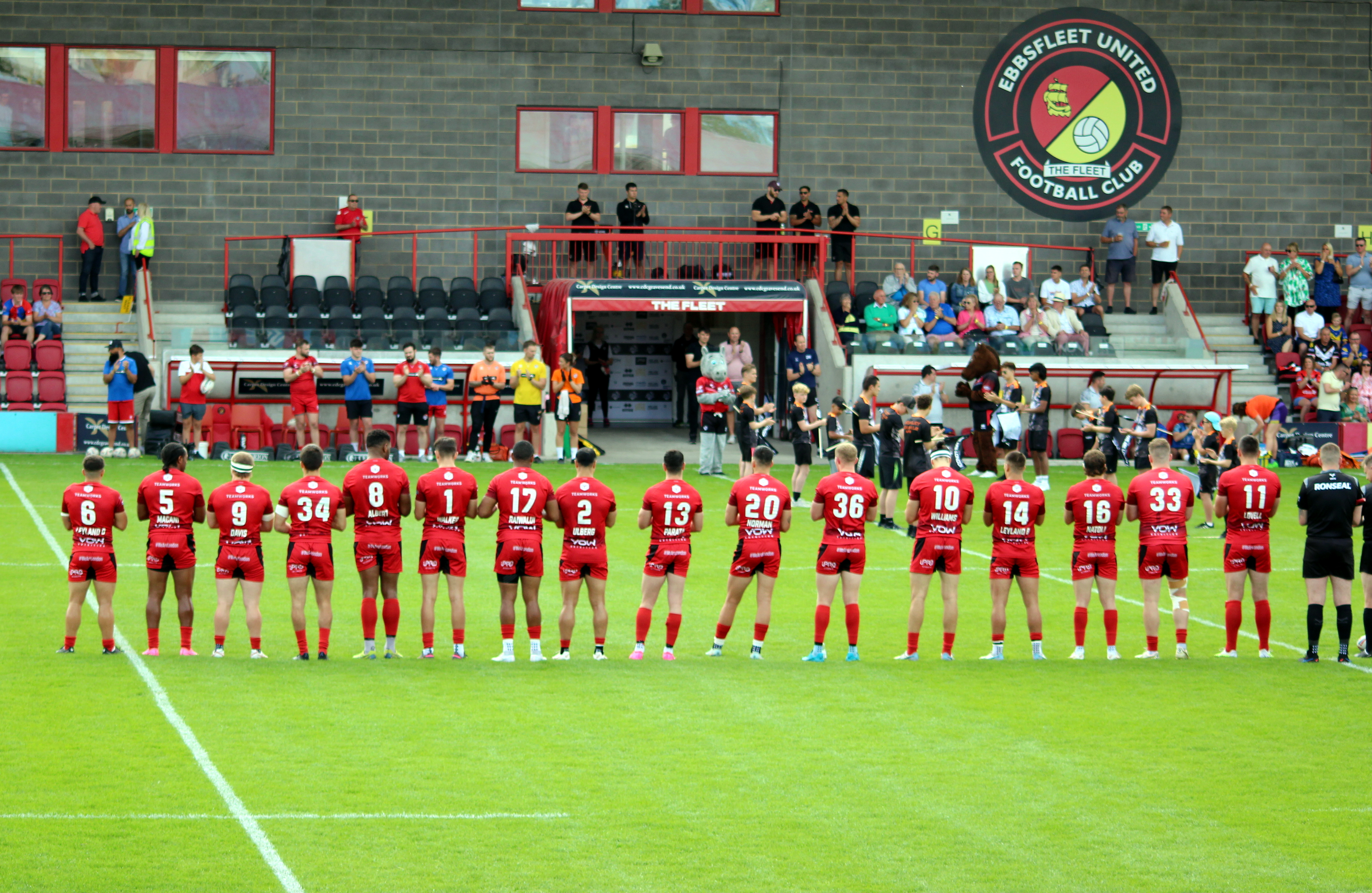
The London Broncos lining up at Ebbsfleet in July 2023

London Broncos 2023 Squad
First team squad			Coaching staff
1 (Scotland) Alex Walker – FB; 2 (Cook Islands) Paul Ulberg – WG; 3 (Australia) Jarred Bassett – CE, FB; 4 (Wales) Dalton Grant – CE; 5 (England) Iliess Macani – WG; 6 (England) Oli Leyland – SO, SH; 7 (England) Rian Horsman – SH, SO; 8 (Papua New Guinea) Wellington Albert – PR; 9 (England) Sam Davis – HK; 10 (England) Jordan Williams – PR; 11 (England) Will Lovell (c) – SR; 12 (England) Marcus Stock – SR; 13 (Italy) Dean Parata – HK, LF	14 (England) Bill Leyland – HK; 15 (Ireland) Lewis Bienek – PR; 16 (Italy) Ethan Natoli – SR; 17 (Fiji) Henry Raiwalui – SH, SO; 18 (Papua New Guinea) Emmanuel Waine – SR; 19 (New Zealand) Dean Whare – CE; 20 (Australia) Corey Norman – SO; 21 (England) Shay Flanagan – SH; 22 (England) Max Allen – SR; 23 (England) Dan Hoyes – CE; 24 (England) Jensen Monk – PR; 25 (England) Jack Howorth – PR; 26 (England) Euan Parke – SR	27 (Brazil) Ramon Silva – PR; 28 (England) Harvie Hill – PR; 29 (England) Zach Eckersley – CE; 30 (Lebanon) Abbas Miski – WG; 31 (England) Logan Caroline-Hines – SH; 32 (England) Jacob Jones – SR; 33 (England) Rob Butler – PR; 34 (England) Matt Davies – HK; 35 (Wales) Kyle Evans – WG; 36 (England) Jacob Gannon – SR; 37 (England) Harvey Makin – PR; 38 (England) Kieran Tyrer – CE; 39 (England) Harry Stevens – CE	Head coach: (England) Mike Eccles; Assistant coach: (Australia) Rhys Lovegrove; Legend: (c) Captain(s); (vc) Vice-captain(s); Injured; Updated: 7 February 2023; Source(s): First Team

=== Regular season table ===
Pos	Team	Pld	W	D	L	PF	PA	PD	Pts	Qualification
1	Featherstone Rovers	27	25	0	2	1079	295	+784	50	League Leaders Shield and qualify for semi-finals
2	Toulouse Olympique	27	19	0	8	834	385	+449	38	Semi-finals
3	Bradford Bulls	27	16	1	10	677	572	+105	33	Eliminators
4	Sheffield Eagles	27	16	0	11	780	560	+220	32	Eliminators
5	London Broncos	27	16	0	11	600	552	+48	32	Eliminators
6	York Knights	27	15	0	12	557	557	0	30	Eliminators
7	Batley Bulldogs	27	15	0	12	506	519	−13	30	
8	Halifax Panthers	27	14	1	12	690	572	+118	29	
9	Widnes Vikings	27	13	0	14	619	654	−35	26	
10	Swinton Lions	27	9	0	18	426	739	−313	18	
11	Barrow Raiders	27	8	1	18	471	672	−201	17	
12	Whitehaven	27	8	0	19	481	809	−328	16	
13	Keighley Cougars	27	8	0	19	506	837	−331	16	Relegation to League One
14	Newcastle Thunder	27	5	1	21	415	918	−503	11	Relegation to League One

Source: RFL
Rules for classification: 1) Competition points; 2) Points difference; 3) Points percentage (points scored/points conceded x 100)

== Fixtures and Results ==
W Win D Draw L Loss

=== Pre-season ===
Date	Time	Competition	Vrs	H/A	Venue	Result	Score	Tries	Goals	Att	Live on TV	Report
20 January	14:00	Friendly	London Skolars	A	Artillery Ground	W	58-18					RFL

=== Betfred Championship ===
Date	Time	Competition	Vrs	H/A	Venue	Result	Score	Tries	Goals	Att	Live on TV	Report
5 February	15:00	Round 1	Batley Bulldogs	H	Plough Lane	L	20-30	Grant, B. Leyland, Walker, Ulberg	O. Leyland (2)	1849		Broncos
12 February	15:00	Round 2	Whitehaven	A	Recreation Ground	W	20-16	Ulberg (2), Davis, Bassett		750		BBC
19 February	15:00	Round 3	Halifax Panthers	A	The Shay	L	18-26					RFL
26 February	15:00	Round 4	Sheffield Eagles	H	Plough Lane	L	20-21					RFL
5 March	15:00	Round 5	Keighley Cougars	A	Cougar Park	L	22-33					RFL
18 March	15:00	Round 6	Newcastle Thunder	A	Kingston Park	W	36-6					RFL
26 March	15:00	Round 7	Swinton Lions	H	Plough Lane	W	16-14					RFL
7 April	15:00	Round 8	Toulouse Olympique	A	Stade Ernest-Wallon	L	0-52					RFL
16 April	15:00	Round 9	Featherstone Rovers	H	Plough Lane	L	10-40					RFL
7 May	15:00	Round 10	York Knights	A	York Community Stadium	L	28-30					RFL
13 May	14:00	Round 11	Barrow Raiders	H	Plough Lane	W	30-16					RFL
27 May	17:00	Round 12	Toulouse Olympique	N	York Community Stadium	W	14-10					RFL
4 June	15:00	Round 13	Widnes Vikings	A	Halton Stadium	W	26-18					RFL
11 June	15:00	Round 14	Bradford Bulls	A	Odsal Stadium	L	16-32					RFL
18 June	15:00	Round 15	Featherstone Rovers	A	Post Office Road	L	6-50					RFL
25 June	15:00	Round 16	Batley Bulldogs	A	Fox's Biscuits Stadium	W	20-18					RFL
2 July	15:00	Round 17	Newcastle Thunder	H	Stonebridge Road	W	56-10					RFL
8 July	18:00	Round 18	Toulouse Olympique	H	Stonebridge Road	W	22-6					RFL
16 July	15:00	Round 19	Swinton Lions	A	Heywood Road	W	12-6					RFL
30 July	15:00	Round 20	York Knights	H	Plough Lane	L	10-24					RFL
6 August	15:00	Round 21	Barrow Raiders	A	Craven Park, Barrow-in-Furness	W	26-6					RFL
20 August	15:00	Round 22	Halifax Panthers	H	Plough Lane	W	26-12					RFL
27 August	15:00	Round 23	Whitehaven	H	Plough Lane	W	34-18					RFL
3 September	15:00	Round 24	Sheffield Eagles	A	Sheffield Olympic Legacy Stadium	L	18-26					RFL
10 September	15:00	Round 25	Widnes Vikings	H	Plough Lane	W	52-12					RFL
17 September	15:00	Round 26	Bradford Bulls	H	Plough Lane	L	10-12					RFL
24 September	15:00	Round 27	Keighley Cougars	H	Plough Lane	W	20-16					RFL

=== Play-offs ===
Date	Time	Competition	Vrs	H/A	Venue	Result	Score	Tries	Goals	Att	Live on TV	Report
1 October	15:00	Eliminators	Sheffield Eagles	A	Sheffield Olympic Legacy Stadium	W	42-0					RFL
8 October	18:00	Semi-final	Featherstone Rovers	A	Post Office Road	W	36-26	Walker (2), Whare, Macani, Grant, Raiwalui	Norman (6)			RFL
15 October	15:00	Grand Final	Toulouse Olympique	A	Stade Ernest-Wallon	W	18-14	Whare, Walker, Macani (2)	Norman			RFL, BBC

==== Team bracket ====
Eliminators
4	Sheffield Eagles	0
5	London Broncos	42
3	Bradford Bulls	22
6	York Knights	8

Semi-finals
1	Featherstone Rovers	26
5	London Broncos	36
2	Toulouse Olympique	38
3	Bradford Bulls	20

Grand Final
2	Toulouse Olympique	14
5	London Broncos	18

Sources:Bradford v York, Toulouse v Bradford

=== Challenge Cup ===
W Win L Loss

Challenge Cup results
Date	Round	Versus	H/A	Venue	Result	Score	Tries	Goals	Attendance	Report
11 March	3	Whitehaven	A	Recreation Ground	W	32–10	Bassett (3), B. Leyland, O. Leyland, Stock	O. Leyland (4)	347	RLP
1 April	4	Doncaster	H	The Rock	W	36–16	O. Leyland (2), Ulberg (2), Albert, Grant, Horsman, B. Leyland, Macani, Parata, Silva, Waine	O. Leyland (9)	428	RLP
23 April	5	Dewsbury Rams	H	The Rock	W	36–16	Macani (2), Albert, Bassett, Bienik, B. Leyland, Stock	O. Leyland (4)	353	RLP
21 May	6	York Knights	A	York Community Stadium	L	12–36	Bassett, Walker	O. Leyland (2)	951	RLP

=== 1895 Cup ===
W Win L Loss

1895 Cup results
Date	Round	Versus	H/A	Venue	Result	Score	Tries	Goals	Attendance	Report
22 July	Semi-final	Halifax Panthers	H	The Rock	L	6–10	Stock	O. Leyland	417	RLP

== Transfers ==
=== In ===
Country	Name	Position	Signed from	Date	Notes
(England)	Sam Davis	Hooker	York Knights	September 2022	
(Australia)	Jarred Bassett	Fullback	London Skolars	October 2022	
(England)	Marcus Stock	Second-row	York Knights	October 2022	
(England)	Jensen Monk	Prop	London Broncos Academy	October 2022	
(Fiji)	Henry Raiwalui	Scrum-half	Wentworthville Magpies	November 2022	
(Italy)	Ethan Natoli	Second-row	Newtown Jets	November 2022	
(Papua New Guinea)	Emmanuel Waine	Second-row	Papua New Guinea Hunters	February 2023	
(Brazil)	Ramon Silva	Prop	Wigan Warriors	February 2023	one-month loan
(England)	Zach Eckersley	Centre	Wigan Warriors	February 2023	one-month loan
(England)	Harvie Hill	Prop	Wigan Warriors	February 2023	one-month loan

=== Out ===
Country	Name	Position	Signed for	Date	Notes
(Wales)	Jude Ferreira	Centre	Hull FC	September 2022	End of Loan
(Italy)	Brock Pelligra	Scrum-half	Toulouse Olympique	September 2022	
(England)	Brad Foster	Loose forward	Bradford Bulls	September 2022	
(Scotland)	Calum Gahan	Hooker	Toulouse Olympique	November 2022	
(Greece)	Rob Tuliatu	Prop	Newcastle Thunder	November 2022	

== Statistics ==
Squad Number	Name	International country	Position	Age	Previous club	Appearances	Tries	Goals	Drop Goals	Points	Notes
1	Alex Walker	(Scotland)	Fullback	-	Halifax Panthers	33	20	0	0	80	
2	Paul Ulberg	(Cook Islands)	Wing	-	Norths Devils	25	12	0	0	48	
3	Jarred Bassett	(Australia)	Centre	-	London Skolars	32	17	0	0	68	
4	Dalton Grant	(Wales)	Centre	-	London Skolars	16	8	0	0	32	
5	Iliess Macani	(England)	Wing	-	London Skolars	30	21	0	0	84	
6	Oli Leyland	(England)	Stand-off	-	London Broncos Academy	32	8	78	0	188	
7	Rian Horsman	(England)	Scrum-half	-	London Broncos Academy	8	2	0	0	8	
8	Wellington Albert	(Papua New Guinea)	Prop	-	Keighley Cougars	26	4	0	0	16	
9	Sam Davis	(England)	Hooker	-	York Knights	29	0	0	0	0	
10	Jordan Williams	(England)	Prop	-	London Skolars	33	4	0	0	16	
11	Will Lovell	(England)	Second-row	-	London Skolars	31	3	0	0	12	
12	Marcus Stock	(England)	Second-row	-	York Knights	33	5	0	0	20	
13	Dean Parata	(Italy)	Hooker	-	Featherstone Rovers	34	6	0	0	24	
14	Bill Leyland	(England)	Hooker	-	London Broncos Academy	32	13	0	0	52	
15	Lewis Bienek	(Ireland)	Prop	-	Castleford Tigers	25	3	0	0	12	
16	Ethan Natoli	(Italy)	Second-row	-	Newtown Jets	32	3	0	0	12	
17	Henry Raiwalui	(Fiji)	Scrum-half	-	Wentworthville Magpies	23	5	0	0	20	
18	Emmanuel Waine	(Papua New Guinea)	Second-row	-	PNG Hunters	14	2	0	0	8	
19	Dean Whare	(New Zealand)	Centre	-	Pia Donkeys	13	12	0	0	48	
20	Corey Norman	(Australia)	Stand-off	-	FC Lézignan	15	1	36	0	76	
22	Max Allen	(England)	Second-row	-	London Broncos Academy	2	0	0	0	0	
23	Dan Hoyes	(England)	Centre	-	London Broncos Academy	7	0	0	0	0	
24	Jensen Monk	(England)	Prop	-	London Broncos Academy	3	0	0	0	0	
25	Jack Howorth	(England)	Prop	-	London Broncos Academy	0	0	0	0	0	
26	Euan Parke	(Scotland)	Prop	-	London Broncos Academy	5	0	0	0	0	
27	Ramon Silva	(Brazil)	Prop	-	Wigan Warriors	11	1	0	0	4	Loan
28	Harvie Hill	(England)	Prop	-	Wigan Warriors	4	0	0	0	0	Loan
29	Zach Eckersley	(England)	Centre	-	Wigan Warriors	4	1	0	0	4	Loan
30	Abbas Miski	(Lebanon)	Wing	-	Wigan Warriors	1	1	0	0	4	Loan
32	Jacob Jones	(England)	Second-row	-	Leigh Leopards	4	0	0	0	0	Loan
33	Rob Butler	(England)	Prop	-	Wakefield Trinity	17	2	0	0	8	
34	Matt Davies	(England)	Hooker	-	Northern Pride	7	0	0	0	0	
35	Kyle Evans	(Wales)	Wing	-	Featherstone Rovers	1	0	0	0	0	Loan
36	Jacob Gannon	(England)	Second-row	-	Leigh Leopards	6	1	0	0	4	Loan
37	Harvey Makin	(England)	Prop	-	Wigan Warriors	1	0	0	0	0	Loan
38	Kieran Tyrer	(England)	Centre	-	Wigan Warriors	1	0	0	0	0	Loan
39	Harry Stevens	(England)	Centre	-	London Broncos Academy	1	0	0	0	0	
--	Samuel Dore	(England)	Prop	-	London Broncos Academy	0	0	0	0	0	

== Player appearances ==
No	Player	1	2	3	4	5	3R CC	6	7	4R CC	8	9	5R CC	10	11	6R CC	12	13	14	15	16	17	18	19	SF 1895	20	21	22	23	24	25	26	27	ELIM	SF	GF
1	Alex Walker	FB	FB	FB	FB	FB	FB	FB	FB	FB	FB	FB	FB	FB	FB	FB	FB	FB		FB	FB	FB	FB	FB	FB	FB	FB	FB	FB	FB	FB	FB		FB	FB	FB
2	Paul Ulberg	WG	WG	WG	WG	WG	WG	WG	WG	WG	WG	WG	WG	WG	WG	WG	WG	WG	WG	WG	WG	WG	WG	WG	WG	WG										
3	Jarred Bassett	CE	CE	CE	CE	CE	CE	CE	CE	CE	CE	CE	CE	CE	CE	CE	CE	CE	FB	CE				CE	CE	CE	CE	CE	CE	CE	WG	CE	CE	CE	CE	CE
4	Dalton Grant	CE					WG	WG	WG	CE	CE																WG	WG	WG	WG	WG	WG	WG	WG	WG	WG
5	Iliess Macani	WG	WG	WG	WG					WG	WG	WG	WG	WG	WG	WG	WG	WG	WG	WG	WG	WG	WG	WG	WG	WG	WG	WG	WG	WG		WG	WG	WG	WG	WG
6	Oli Leyland	SO	SO	SO	SO	SO	SH	SO	SO	SO	SO	SO	SO	SO	SO	SO	SO	SO	SO	SO	SO	SO	SO	SO	SO		SO	SO	SO	SUB	SO	SUB	FB	SO		
7	Rian Horsman	SH			SUB	SH	SO			SH						SUB		SUB											SUB							
8	Wellington Albert	SUB	SUB	SUB	PR	B		SUB	SUB	PR		PR	PR	SUB	PR	SUB	PR	PR	PR	PR		SUB						SUB	SUB	SUB	PR	PR	PR	PR		SUB
9	Sam Davis	HK	HK	HK	HK	HK	HK	HK	HK				HK	HK	HK	HK	HK	HK	HK	HK	SUB	SUB	HK	HK	HK	HK				SUB	HK	HK	HK	HK	HK	HK
10	Jordan Williams	PR	PR	SUB	PR	PR	PR	PR	PR	PR	PR	SUB	SUB	SUB	SUB	SUB	SUB	SUB	SUB	PR		PR	SUB	SUB	SUB	SUB	SUB	SUB	SUB		SUB	SUB	SUB	SUB	SUB	SUB
11	Will Lovell	SR	SR	SR	SR	SR	SR	SR		SR				SR	SR	SR	SR	SR	SR	SR	SR	SR	SR	SR	SR	SR	SR	SR	SR	SR	SR	SR	SR	SR	SR	SR
12	Marcus Stock	SUB	LF	LF	LF	PR	PR	LF	PR	SUB	LF	LF	SR	PR	LF	PR			SR	LF	PR	B	PR	PR	PR	SUB	SUB	SUB	SUB	SUB	SUB	SUB	SUB	SUB	SUB	SR
13	Dean Parata	LF	SH	SH	SH	LF	LF	SH	LF	LF	SH	HK	LF	LF	SUB	LF	LF	LF	LF		LF	LF	LF	LF	LF	LF	LF	LF	LF	LF	LF	LF	LF	LF	LF	LF
14	Bill Leyland	SUB	SUB	SUB	SUB	SUB	SUB	SUB	SUB	HK	HK	SUB	SUB	SUB	SUB	SUB	SUB			SUB	HK	HK	SUB	SUB	SUB		HK	HK	HK	HK	SUB	SUB	SUB	SUB	SUB	SUB
15	Lewis Bienek	PR	PR	PR			SUB	PR			PR	PR	PR	PR	PR	PR	PR	PR	PR	SUB			SUB	SUB	PR	PR	PR	PR	PR	PR					PR	PR
16	Ethan Natoli	SR	SR	SR	SR	SR	SR	CE	CE	SR	SR	CE	SR	SR	SR	SR	SR	SR	CE	SR		CE	CE	SR		SUB	SR	SR	SR	SR	SR	SR	SR	SR	SR	
17	Henry Raiwalui							SUB	SH			SH	SH	SH	SH	SH	SH	SH	SH	SH		CE	CE	CE	CE	SO				SO	CE	SO	SO	CE	SO	SO
18	Emmanuel Waine							SUB	SR	SUB		SR	SUB	CE	CE	CE		SUB													SUB		SUB	SUB	SUB	SUB
19	Dean Whare																CE	CE	CE						SUB	CE	CE	CE	CE	CE	CE		CE		CE	CE
20	Corey Norman																	Sent off (straight red)	Sent off (straight red)	Sent off (straight red)	Sent off (straight red)	SH	SH	SH	SH	SH	SH	SH	SH	SH	SH	SH	SH	SH	SH	SH
22	Max Allen						SUB				SUB									SUB																
23	Daniel Hoyes						CE					SUB	CE						SUB	CE							SUB					CE				
24	Jenson Monk					SUB	SUB				SUB										SUB															
26	Euan Parke									SUB	SUB		SUB						SUB	SUB																
27	Ramon Silva	SUB	SUB	SUB	SUB				SUB	SUB	SUB	SUB		SUB	SUB		SUB																			
28	Harvie Hill		SUB	PR	SUB	SUB																														
29	Zach Eckersley		CE	CE	CE	CE																														
30	Abbas Miski					WG																														
32	Jacob Jones							SR	SR		SR	SR																								
33	Rob Butler																	SUB	SUB		PR	PR	PR	PR		PR	PR	PR	PR	PR	PR	PR	PR	PR	PR	PR
34	Matt Davies																				SUB	SUB	SUB		SUB	SUB	SUB	SUB								
35	Kyle Evans																				CE															
36	Jacob Gannon																				SR	SR	SR	SUB	SR	SR										
37	Harvey Makin																				SUB															
38	Kieran Tyrer																				SH															
39	Harry Stevens																				CE															
