= 2022 London Broncos season =

43rd London Broncos season

- 2022 Championship Rank: 11th
- Challenge Cup: 4th round
- 2022 record: Wins: 8; draws: 1; losses: 19
- Points scored: For: 556; against: 774

Team information
- Chairman: David Hughes
- Head Coach: Jermaine Coleman (until 24 May 2022); Mike Eccles (from 24 May 2022)
- Captain: Will Lovell
- Stadium: Plough Lane; Kuflink Stadium
- Avg. attendance: 1461
- High attendance: 6752

Top scorers
- Tries: Paul Ulberg - 16
- Goals: Oli Leyland - 52
- Points: Oli Leyland - 112
Home colours	Away colours
← 2021	List of seasons	2023 →

The 2022 London Broncos season is the 43rd year in the club's history, the third consecutive season out of the Super League and their first season at Plough Lane as tenants of AFC Wimbledon. They were coached by Jermaine Coleman between January and May 2022, and Mike Eccles from May 2022 onwards. The Broncos competed in both the 2022 Betfred Championship and the 2022 Challenge Cup.

Head coach Jermaine Coleman assistant coach Jy-mel Coleman were relieved of their duties by mutual consent in May 2022.

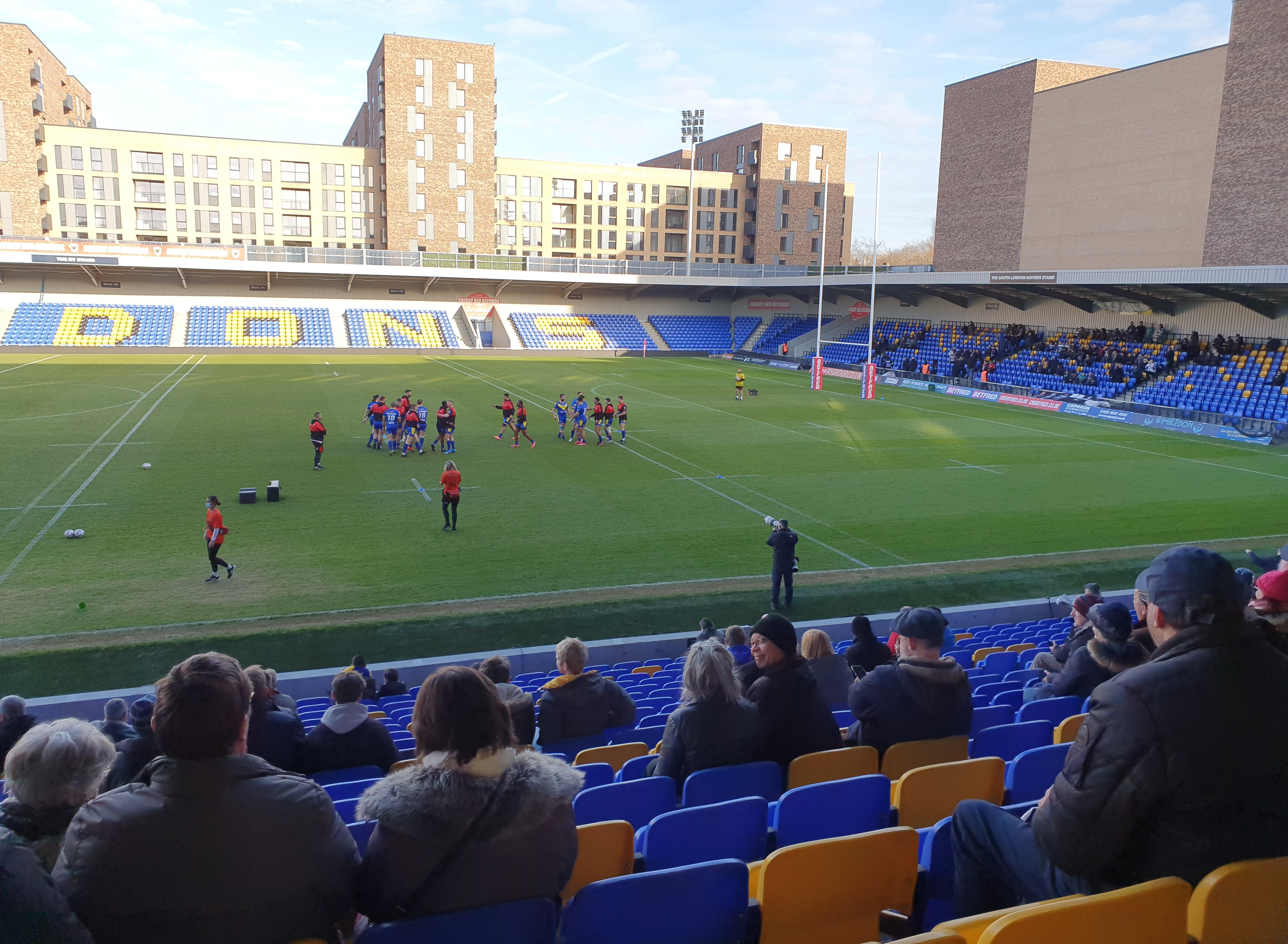
Plough Lane as the London Broncos players are warming up

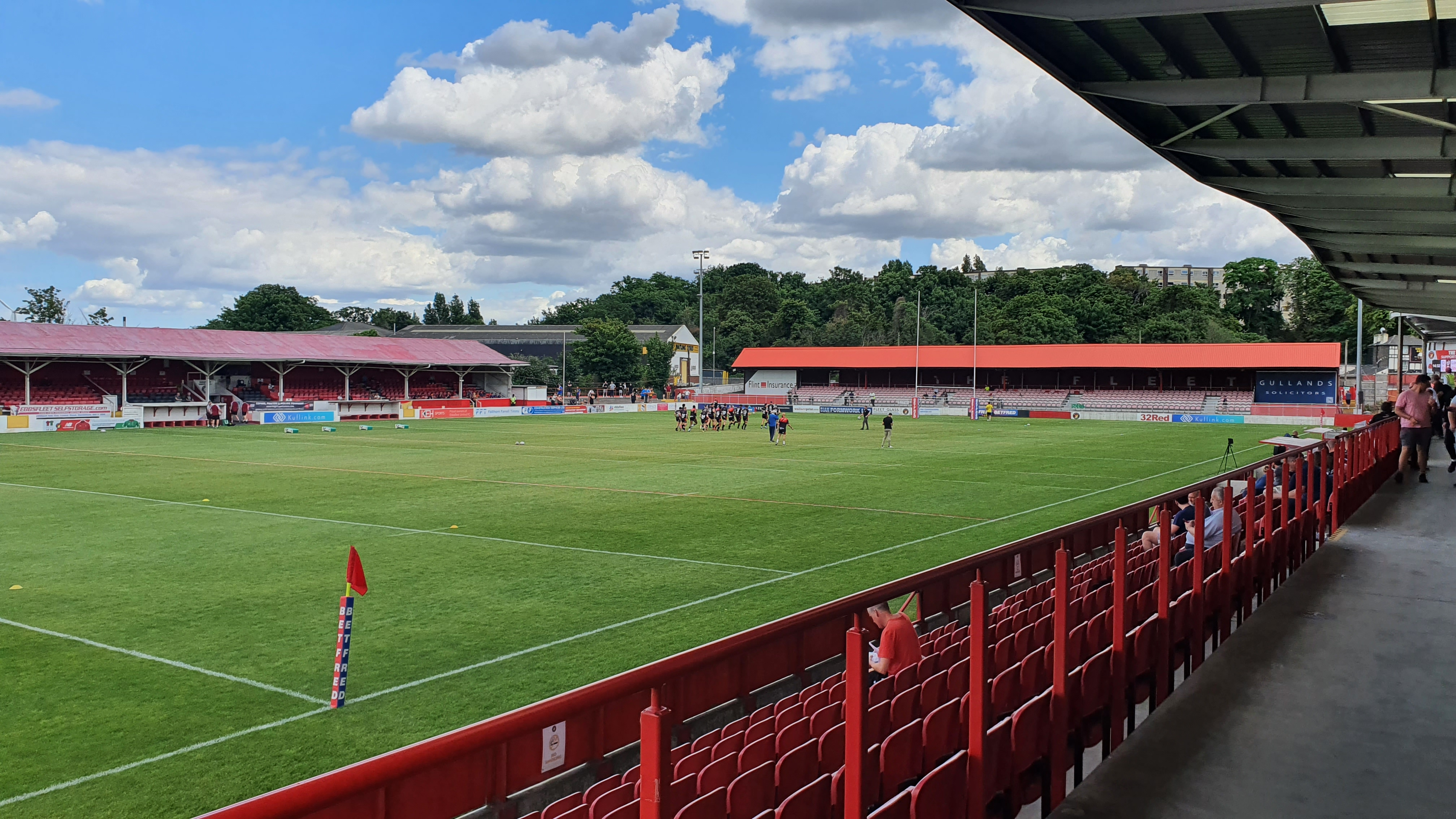
Kuflink Stadium just after the London Broncos players have begun to warm up

== 2022 squad ==
London Broncos 2022 Squad
First team squad			Coaching staff
1 (Fiji) Sitiveni Moceidreke – CE; 2 (Cook Islands) Paul Ulberg – WG; 3 (Wales) Jude Ferreira – CE; 4 (Tonga) Paulos Latu – CE, SR; 5 (England) Iliess Macani – WG; 6 (England) Oli Leyland – SO, SH; 7 (England) Rian Horsman – SH, SO; 8 (Papua New Guinea) Wellington Albert – PR; 9 (Italy) Dean Parata – HK; 10 (Ireland) Lewis Bienek – PR; 11 (England) Will Lovell (c) – SR; 12 (France) Rhys Curran – SR; 13 (England) Brad Foster – LF	14 (Scotland) Calum Gahan – HK; 15 (England) Jordan Williams – PR; 16 (Wales) Will Blakemore – SR; 17 (Scotland) Rob Oakley – HK, LF; 18 (Italy) Ronny Palumbo – SR; 19 (Australia) Jacob Thomas – SO, SH; 20 (England) Dan Coates – SO; 21 (Australia) Will Ramsey – SH, SO; 22 (Greece) Rob Tuliatu – PR, LF; 23 (Philippines) Mike Greenhalgh – SR; 24 (England) Max Allen – SR; 25 (England) Bill Leyland – HK; 26 (Philippines) Judd Greenhalgh – SR	27 (England) Jack Howorth – CE; 28 (Wales) Dalton Grant – CE; 29 (England) Lameck Juma – WG; 30 (Greece) Adam Vrahnos – SR; 31 (Scotland) Alex Walker – FB; 32 (England) Amir Bourouh – HK; 32 (England) Neil Thorman – SO; 32 (Italy) Brock Pelligra – SH; 33 (France) Dane Chisholm – SH; 33 (England) Sam Davis – HK; 34 (England) Dan Hoyes – CE; 35 (England) Sam Hall – PR; -- (England) Euan Parke – PR	Head coach: (England) Mike Eccles; Legend: (c) Captain(s); (vc) Vice-captain(s); Injured; Updated: 12 July 2022; Source(s): First Team

== Tables ==
=== 2022 Betfred Championship table - Regular Season ===
Pos	Team	Pld	W	D	L	PF	PA	PD	Pts	Qualification
1	Leigh Centurions	27	26	0	1	1306	208	+1098	52	Championship Leaders' Shield & advance to play-off semi-final
2	Featherstone Rovers	27	23	1	3	1060	468	+592	47	Advance to play-off semi-final
3	Halifax Panthers	27	20	0	7	837	442	+395	40	Advance to play-off eliminators
4	Barrow Raiders	27	18	1	8	757	587	+170	37	Advance to play-off eliminators
5	Batley Bulldogs	27	17	2	8	738	551	+187	36	Advance to play-off eliminators
6	York City Knights	27	18	0	9	677	596	+81	36	Advance to play-off eliminators
7	Sheffield Eagles	27	12	0	15	701	660	+41	24	
8	Widnes Vikings	27	12	0	15	567	679	−112	24	
9	Bradford Bulls	27	11	0	16	523	677	−154	22	
10	Whitehaven	27	9	1	17	488	854	−366	19	
11	London Broncos	27	8	1	18	548	740	−192	17	
12	Newcastle Thunder	27	7	1	19	559	877	−318	15	
13	Dewsbury Rams	27	3	1	23	385	964	−579	7	Relegated to League 1
14	Workington Town	27	1	0	26	296	1139	−843	2	Relegated to League 1

== Results ==
=== 2022 Betfred Championship ===
Round	Home	Score	Away	Match Information
Round	Home	Score	Away	Date and Time	Venue	Referee	Attendance	Source
1	London Broncos	12–34	Widnes Vikings	30 January 2022, 15:00	Plough Lane	N. Bennett	2,182	Source:
2	Halifax Panthers	28–0	London Broncos	6 February 2022, 15:00	The Shay	J. Child	1,433	Source:
3	London Broncos	0–8	Whitehaven	13 February 2022, 15:00	Plough Lane	M. Smaill	1,411	Source:
4	Featherstone Rovers	30–12	London Broncos	19 February 2022, 17:30	Post Office Road	J. Vella	2,796	Source:
5	London Broncos	24–26	York City Knights	6 March 2022, 15:00	Plough Lane	M. Smaill	903	Source:
6	Barrow Raiders	18–18	London Broncos	20 March 2022, 15:00	Craven Park	S. Mikalauskas	1,979	Source:
7	London Broncos	6–8	Bradford Bulls	3 April 2022, 15:00	Plough Lane	C. Worsley	1,153	Source:
8	Sheffield Eagles	30–10	London Broncos	16 April 2022, 15:00	Eco-Power Stadium (Note: Match played at Doncaster due to ongoing works at Sheffield's home ground)	B. Thaler	943	Source:
9	Leigh Centurions	64–0	London Broncos	24 April 2022, 15:00	Leigh Sports Village	L. Moore	2,587	Source:
10	London Broncos	36–12	Dewsbury Rams	1 May 2022, 15:00	Plough Lane	J. Smith	Not Given	Source:
11	London Broncos	22–52	Newcastle Thunder	13 May 2022, 19:45	Leigh Sports Village	M. Smaill	940	Source:
12	Batley Bulldogs	28–12	London Broncos	22 May 2022, 15:00	Fox's Biscuits Stadium	L. Rush		Source:
13	Workington Town	32–18	London Broncos	2 June 2022, 12:30	Derwent Park	L. Rush	1,135	Source:
14	York City Knights	36–34	London Broncos	5 June 2022, 15:00	York Community Stadium	J. Vella	Not Given	Source:
15	Dewsbury Rams	18–26	London Broncos	12 June 2022, 15:00	Tetley's Stadium	M. Rossleigh	579	Source:
16	Widnes Vikings	26–22	London Broncos	26 June 2022, 15:00	Halton Stadium	M. Smaill	2,926	Source:
17	London Broncos	36–28	Sheffield Eagles	3 July 2022, 15:00	Stonebridge Road	N. Bennett	750	Source:
18	London Broncos	22–42	Featherstone Rovers	10 July 2022, 15:00	Plough Lane	M. Rossleigh	850	Source:
19	Bradford Bulls	12–30	London Broncos	16 July 2022, 18:00	Odsal Stadium	N. Bennett	2,762	Source:
20	London Broncos	38–10	Halifax Panthers	24 July 2022, 15:00	Plough Lane	M. Rossleigh	950	Source:
21	London Broncos	12–38	Sheffield Eagles	30 July 2022, 12:45	Headingley Stadium	J. Vella	6,752	Source:
22	Newcastle Thunder	0–44	London Broncos	7 August 2022, 15:00	Kingston Park	A. Moore	395	Source:
23	London Broncos	38–12	Workington Town	14 August 2022, 15:00	Plough Lane	S. Mikalauskas		Source:
24	London Broncos	30–20	Batley Bulldogs	21 August 2022, 15:00	Plough Lane	A. Moore	750	Source:
25	Whitehaven	40–20	London Broncos	28 August 2022, 15:00	Recreation Ground	C. Worsley		Source:
26	London Broncos	6–58	Leigh Centurions	4 September 2022, 15:00	Plough Lane	M. Griffiths	900	Source:
27	London Broncos	20–30	Barrow Raiders	11 September 2022, 15:00	Plough Lane	J. Vella	900	Source:

=== 2022 Betfred Challenge Cup ===
Challenge Cup round 4 result
Home	Score	Away	Match Information
Home	Score	Away	Date and Time	Venue	Referee	Attendance
London Broncos	8–34	Bradford Bulls	27 February 2022; 15:00	Plough Lane	N. Bennett	551

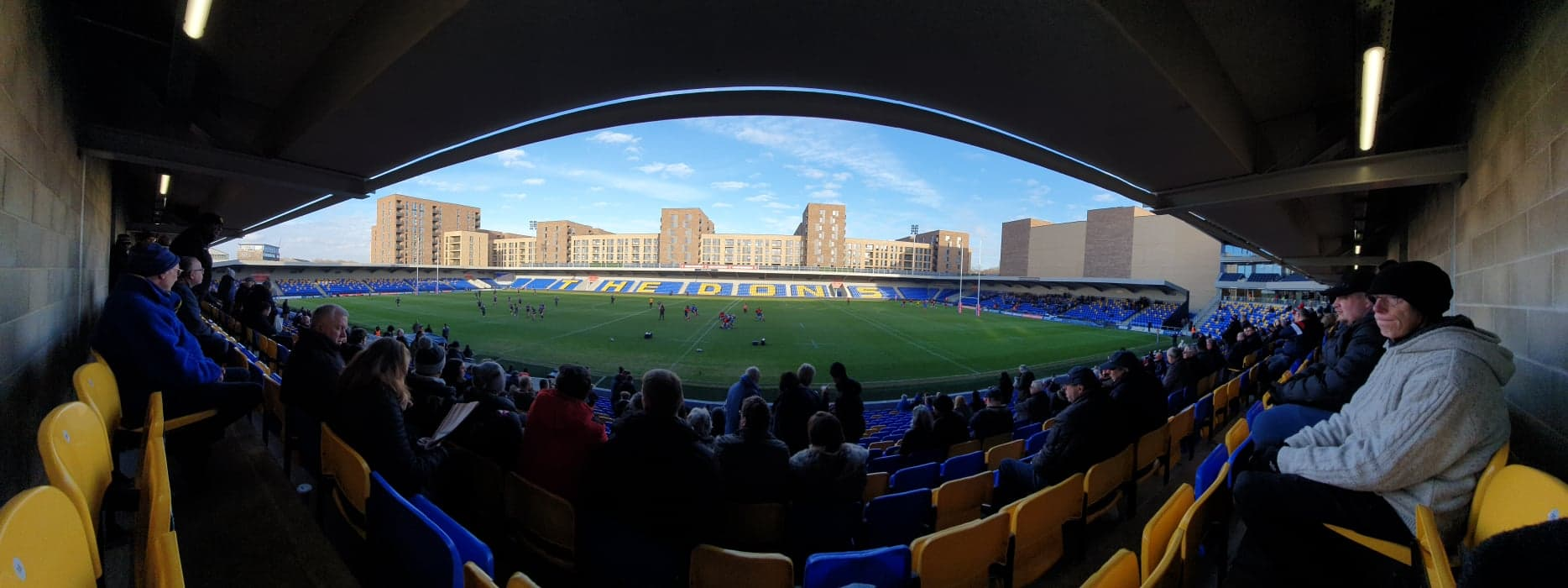
Plough Lane pre-game in the Broncos first game at the new ground

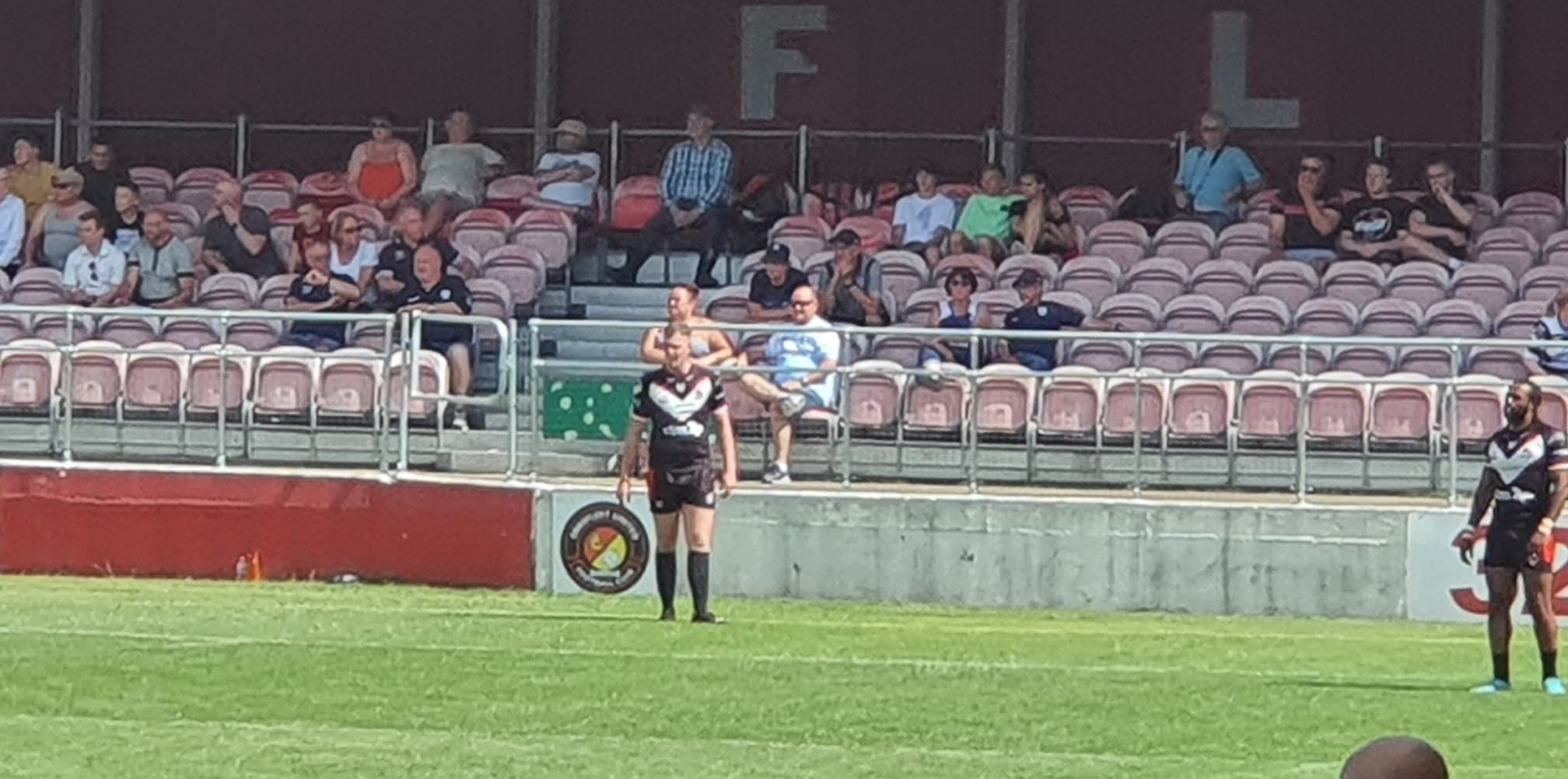
The Broncos playing at Stonebridge Road in July 2022

== Players making a Broncos debut in 2022 ==
654. (Wales) Dalton Grant
655. (Wales) Jude Ferreira
656. (England) Lameck Juma
657. (England) Dan Coates
658. (Italy) Dean Parata
659. (Philippines) Mike Greenhalgh
660. (England) Brad Foster
661. (Italy) Ronny Palumbo
662. (Greece) Rob Tuliatu
663. (Fiji) Sitiveni Moceidreke
664. (Australia) Will Ramsey
665. (Australia) Jacob Thomas
666. (Greece) Adam Vrahnos
667. (Cook Islands) Paul Ulberg
668. (Scotland) Calum Gahan
669. (England) Amir Bourouh
670. (France) Dane Chisholm
671. (Papua New Guinea) Wellington Albert
672. (England) Neil Thorman
673. (England) Dan Hoyes
674. (Italy) Brock Pelligra
675. (England) Max Allen
676. (England) Bill Leyland
677. (England) Euan Parke
678. (England) Sam Hall

== Statistics ==
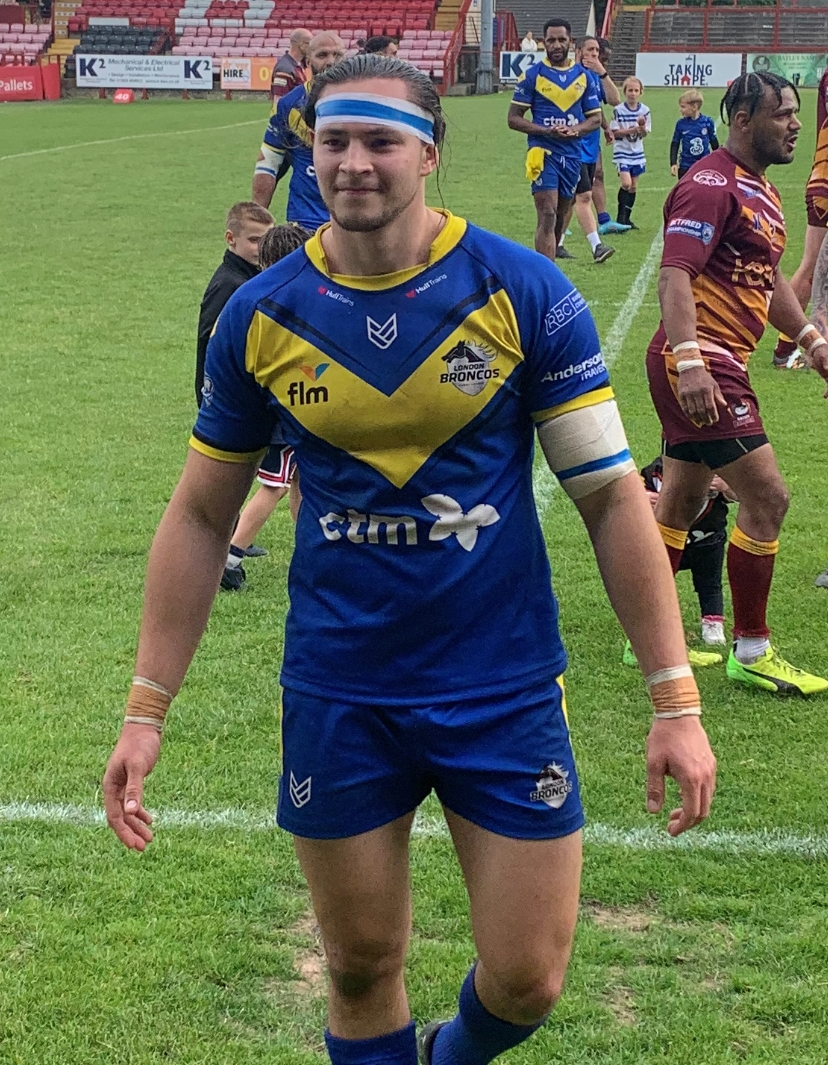
Jordan Williams playing the London Broncos against the Batley Bulldogs in May

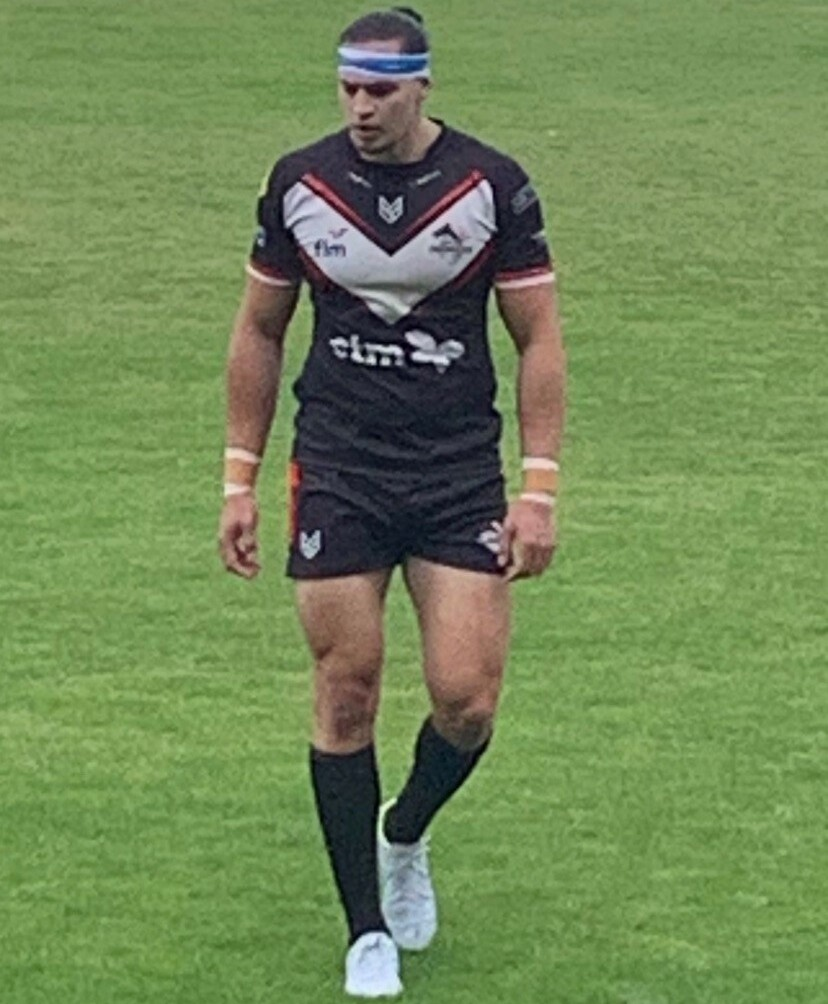
Jordan Williams playing the London Broncos in July

Squad Number	Name	International country	Position	Age	Previous club	Appearances	Tries	Goals	Drop Goals	Points	Notes
1	Sitiveni Moceidreke	(Fiji)	Centre	-	St. George Illawarra Dragons	24	6	13	0	50	
2	Paul Ulberg	(Cook Islands)	Wing	-	Norths Devils	25	16	0	0	64	
3	Jude Ferreira	(Wales)	Centre	-	Hull F.C.	11	2	0	0	8	Season long loan
4	Paulos Latu	(Tonga)	Centre	-	London Skolars	12	2	0	0	8	
5	Iliess Macani	(England)	Wing	-	London Skolars	28	15	0	0	60	
6	Oli Leyland	(England)	Stand-off	-	London Broncos Academy	25	2	52	0	112	
7	Rian Horsman	(England)	Scrum-half	-	London Broncos Academy	7	0	0	0	0	
8	Wellington Albert	(Papua New Guinea)	Prop	-	Keighley Cougars	15	2	0	0	8	
9	Dean Parata	(Italy)	Hooker	-	Featherstone Rovers	28	10	0	0	40	
10	Lewis Bienek	(Ireland)	Prop	-	Castleford Tigers	23	6	0	0	24	
11	Will Lovell	(England)	Second-row	-	London Skolars	25	5	0	0	20	
12	Rhys Curran	(France)	Second-row	-	Toulouse Olympique	20	2	0	0	8	
13	Brad Foster	(England)	Loose forward	-	Doncaster	26	2	0	0	8	
14	Calum Gahan	(Scotland)	Hooker	-	Norths Devils	12	3	0	0	12	Joined club in February 2022
15	Jordan Williams	(England)	Prop	-	London Skolars	25	4	0	0	16	
16	Will Blakemore	(Wales)	Second-row	-	London Broncos Academy	7	0	0	0	0	Left club in June 2022
17	Rob Oakley	(Scotland)	Loose forward	-	London Broncos Academy	15	0	0	0	0	
18	Ronny Palumbo	(Italy)	Second-row	-	Manly Sea Eagles	22	1	0	0	4	
19	Jacob Thomas	(Australia)	Stand-off	-	London Skolars	4	0	1	0	2	
20	Dan Coates	(England)	Stand-off	-	Coventry Bears	4	0	0	0	0	Left club in March 2022
21	Will Ramsey	(Australia)	Scrum-half	-	West Wales Raiders	2	0	0	0	0	
22	Rob Tuliatu	(Greece)	Prop	-	London Skolars	20	0	0	0	0	
23	Mike Greenhalgh	(Philippines)	Second-row	-	London Skolars	3	0	0	0	0	Left club in May 2022
24	Max Allen	(England)	Second-row	-	London Broncos Academy	3	0	0	0	0	
25	Bill Leyland	(England)	Hooker	-	London Broncos Academy	2	0	0	0	0	
26	Judd Greenhalgh	(Philippines)	Second-row	-	London Skolars	0	0	0	0	0	Left club in August 2022
27	Jack Howorth	(England)	Centre	-	London Broncos Academy	0	0	0	0	0	
28	Dalton Grant	(Wales)	Centre	-	London Skolars	19	5	0	0	20	
29	Lameck Juma	(England)	Wing	-	London Skolars	4	1	0	0	4	Left club in May 2022
30	Adam Vrahnos	(Greece)	Second-row	-	London Skolars	6	0	0	0	0	
31	Alex Walker	(Scotland)	Fullback	-	Halifax Panthers	23	13	0	0	52	
32	Amir Bourouh	(England)	Hooker	-	Salford Red Devils	1	0	0	0	0	Short term loan
32	Neil Thorman	(England)	Stand-off	-	London Skolars	3	0	1	0	2	Short term loan
32	Brock Pelligra	(Italy)	Scrum-half	-	AS Carcassonne	7	0	0	0	0	Joined club in May 2022
33	Dane Chisholm	(France)	Scrum-half	-	Featherstone Rovers	3	1	7	0	18	Short term loan
33	Sam Davis	(England)	Hooker	-	York City Knights	13	0	0	0	0	mid season loan
34	Dan Hoyes	(England)	Centre	-	London Broncos Academy	1	1	0	0	4	
35	Euan Parke	(Scotland)	Prop	-	London Broncos Academy	1	0	0	0	0	
35	Sam Hall	(England)	Prop	-	Castleford Tigers	6	3	0	0	12	extended loan

== Player appearances ==
No	Player	1	2	3	4	4 CC	5	6	7	8	9	10	11	12	13	14	15	16	17	18	19	20	21	22	23	24	25	26	27
1	Sitiveni Moceidreke		FB	FB	FB	FB	SH	SH	SO	SO	CE	CE	SH				CE	CE	CE	CE	CE	CE	CE	CE	CE	CE	CE	CE	CE
2	Paul Ulberg				WG	WG	WG	WG	WG	WG	WG	WG	WG	WG	WG	WG	WG	WG	WG	WG	WG	WG	WG	WG	WG	WG	WG	WG	WG
3	Jude Ferreira	CE	CE						CE			CE	CE	CE	CE	CE	CE	CE	CE										
4	Paulos Latu			CE	CE	CE	CE	CE		CE	SUB	SUB	CE	SUB	CE					SUB									
5	Iliess Macani	WG	WG	WG	WG	WG	WG	WG	WG	WG	WG	WG	WG	WG	WG	WG	WG	WG	WG	WG	WG	WG	WG	WG	WG	WG	WG	WG	WG
6	Oli Leyland	FB		SH	SO	SO	SO	SO			SO	SO	SO	SO	SO	SO	SO	SH	SH	SH	SH	SH	SH	SH	SH	SH	SH	SH	SH
7	Rian Horsman	SO	SO	SUB	SH																						SUB	SO	SO
8	Wellington Albert									SUB	SUB	SUB	SUB	PR				SUB	SUB	PR	PR	PR	SUB	PR	PR	PR	PR		
9	Dean Parata	HK	HK	HK	LF	LF	LF	LF	HK	LF	LF	LF	HK	HK	HK	HK	HK	LF	LF	SO	SO	SO	SO	SO	SO	SO	SO	LF	LF
10	Lewis Bienek	SUB	SUB	PR			SUB	PR	PR	SUB	SUB	PR	PR	PR	PR	PR	PR	SUB	PR			SUB	PR		SUB	SUB	SUB	PR	PR
11	Will Lovell	SR	SR	SR	SR	SR	SR		LF	PR	PR	SR	SR	SR	SR	Sent to blood bin	SR	SR	SR	SR	SR	SR	SR	SR	SR	SR	SR	SR	
12	Rhys Curran		SR	SR	SR	SR	SR	SR	SR	SR					SR			SR	SR	SR	SR	SR	SR	SR	SR	SR		SR	SR
13	Brad Foster	LF	LF	LF		PR	PR	SUB	PR	PR	PR	SR	SR	SR	SUB	SR	SR	SUB	SUB		SUB	SUB	SUB	SUB	SUB	SUB	SR	SUB	SUB
14	Calum Gahan				HK	HK	HK	HK	SUB	SUB	HK	HK														SUB	SUB	SUB	SUB
15	Jordan Williams	SR	PR		SUB	SUB	SUB	SUB	SUB	SUB	SR	SUB	SUB	LF	PR	PR	PR	PR	PR		SUB	PR		PR	PR	PR	PR	PR	PR
16	Will Blakemore	PR	PR	PR			SUB	SUB					PR		SUB														
17	Rob Oakley	SUB		SUB				SUB	SUB	HK	SUB									SUB	SUB	SUB	SUB	SUB	SUB	LF	LF	SUB	
18	Ronny Palumbo	SUB	SUB		PR	CE	CE	SR	SR	SR	SR	PR	LF	SUB	LF	LF	SUB			LF	LF	LF	LF	LF	LF				SR
19	Jacob Thomas			SO					SH					SH	SH														
20	Dan Coates	SH	SH		SUB	SH																							
21	Will Ramsey		SUB			SUB																							
22	Rob Tuliatu	SUB	SUB	SUB	PR	PR	PR	PR	SUB			SUB	SUB	SUB	SUB	SUB					SUB			SUB	SUB	SUB	SUB	SUB	SUB
23	Mike Greenhalgh	PR			SUB	SUB																							
24	Max Allen															SR	SUB			SUB									
25	Bill Leyland															SUB				SUB									
28	Dalton Grant	CE	CE	CE				CE	CE	CE	CE			CE					SUB	CE	CE	CE	CE	CE	CE	CE	CE	CE	CE
29	Lameck Juma	WG	WG	WG	CE																								
30	Adam Vrahnos			SUB	SUB	SUB										SUB	SUB												SUB
31	Alex Walker						FB	FB	FB	FB	FB	FB	FB	FB	FB	FB	FB	FB	FB	FB	FB	FB	FB	FB	FB	FB	FB	FB	FB
32	Amir Bourouh						SUB																						
32	Neil Thorman												SUB	SUB	SUB														
32	Brock Pelligra															SH	SH	SO	SO			SUB	SUB	SUB					
33	Dane Chisholm									SH	SH	SH																	
33	Sam Davis																SUB	HK	HK	HK	HK	HK	HK	HK	HK	HK	HK	HK	HK
34	Dan Hoyes															CE													
35	Euan Parke															SUB													
35	Sam Hall																LF	PR	SUB	PR	PR		PR						
