= Sam Hall (rugby league) =

English professional rugby league footballer

Personal information
- Full name: Samuel Lewis Hall
- Born: 8 May 2002 (age 24) Leeds, West Yorkshire, England
- Height: 6 ft 4 in (1.93 m)
- Weight: 16 st 3 lb (103 kg)

Playing information
- Position: Prop, Loose forward
Club
Years	Team	Pld	T	G	FG	P
2020–26	Castleford Tigers	67	3	0	0	12
2022(DR)	→ Midlands Hurricanes	1	0	0	0	0
2022(loan)	→ London Broncos	6	3	0	0	12
2023(DR)	→ Midlands Hurricanes	1	0	0	0	0
2027–	Toulouse Olympique	0	0	0	0	0
	Total	75	6	0	0	24
- Source: As of 12 September 2026

Sam Hall (born 8 May 2002) is an English professional rugby league footballer who plays as a prop or loose forward for Toulouse Olympique in the Super League.

He has previously spent time on loan and dual registration from Castleford at the Midlands Hurricanes in League 1, and at the London Broncos in the Championship.

== Background ==
Hall was born in Leeds, West Yorkshire, England.

He studied at Garforth Academy.

Hall played junior rugby league for Oulton Raiders. He joined the Castleford Tigers development system aged 14.

== Playing career ==
=== Castleford Tigers ===
In February 2020, Hall had been preparing to play for Castleford's reserves, but injuries to teammates saw him drafted into the first team aged 17. He made his Super League debut for the Castleford Tigers (Heritage No. 998) against the Wigan Warriors on 7 February 2020. Weeks later, he signed full-time with the Tigers on a 2-year contract.

Ahead of the 2021 season, Hall aimed for further Super League experience, and said, "it's a hard, hard challenge to break through with the talent of the older players, but if I get a chance I've just got to take it and play as well as I can." Hall made three further first-team appearances for Castleford that year, as well as standout performances for the under-19s. He signed a one-year contract extension in October 2021.

In June 2022, Hall signed a two-year contract extension at Castleford, keeping him with the Tigers until the end of 2024. He said, "I feel very much at home, I like the environment and the players. There was never any doubt - I wanted to stay here." Head coach Lee Radford added, "Sam has a smart football IQ and a great skill set. He plays in a position where there is a genuine pathway for him at the club."

The 2023 season was a breakout personal year for Hall, as he established himself a regular place in Castleford's first-team from April. He scored his first try for the Tigers on 2 September against the Warrington Wolves. He made a total of 16 appearances as a prop or loose forward as the club narrowly survived a relegation battle with Wakefield.

On 5 April 2024, Hall scored his second Super League try for Castleford against the Salford Red Devils.

==== Midlands Hurricanes (dual registration) ====
Hall made one appearance for the Midlands Hurricanes in League 1 during the 2022 season, through their dual registration agreement with Castleford. He returned to the club in the following year, making one further appearance for the Hurricanes in 2023.

==== London Broncos (loan) ====
In June 2022, Hall joined the London Broncos in the Championship on loan. Head coach Mike Eccles said, "Sam is a big unit and a true ball-playing middle who has fantastic ability as both a carrier and being able to shift possession around the field." He made six appearances at prop or loose forward for the Broncos and scored tries against Dewsbury, Sheffield and Bradford.

=== Toulouse Olympique ===
On 30 August 2026 it was reported that he had signed for Toulouse Olympique in the Super League

== Statistics ==
Appearances and points in all competitions by year
Club	Season	Tier	App	T	G	DG	Pts
Castleford Tigers	2020	Super League	1	0	0	0	0
Castleford Tigers	2021	Super League	3	0	0	0	0
Castleford Tigers	2022	Super League	2	0	0	0	0
Castleford Tigers	2023	Super League	16	1	0	0	4
Castleford Tigers	2024	Super League	15	1	0	0	4
Castleford Tigers	2025	Super League	15	0	0	0	0
Castleford Tigers	2026	Super League	11	0	0	0	0
Castleford Tigers	Total		63	2	0	0	8
→ Midlands Hurricanes (DR)	2022	League 1	1	0	0	0	0
→ Midlands Hurricanes (DR)	2023	League 1	1	0	0	0	0
→ Midlands Hurricanes (DR)	Total		2	0	0	0	0
→ London Broncos (loan)	2022	Championship	6	3	0	0	12
Toulouse Olympique	2027	Super League	0	0	0	0	0
Career total			71	5	0	0	20

As of match played 24 April 2026
