= Alex Walker (rugby league) =

Scotland international rugby league footballer

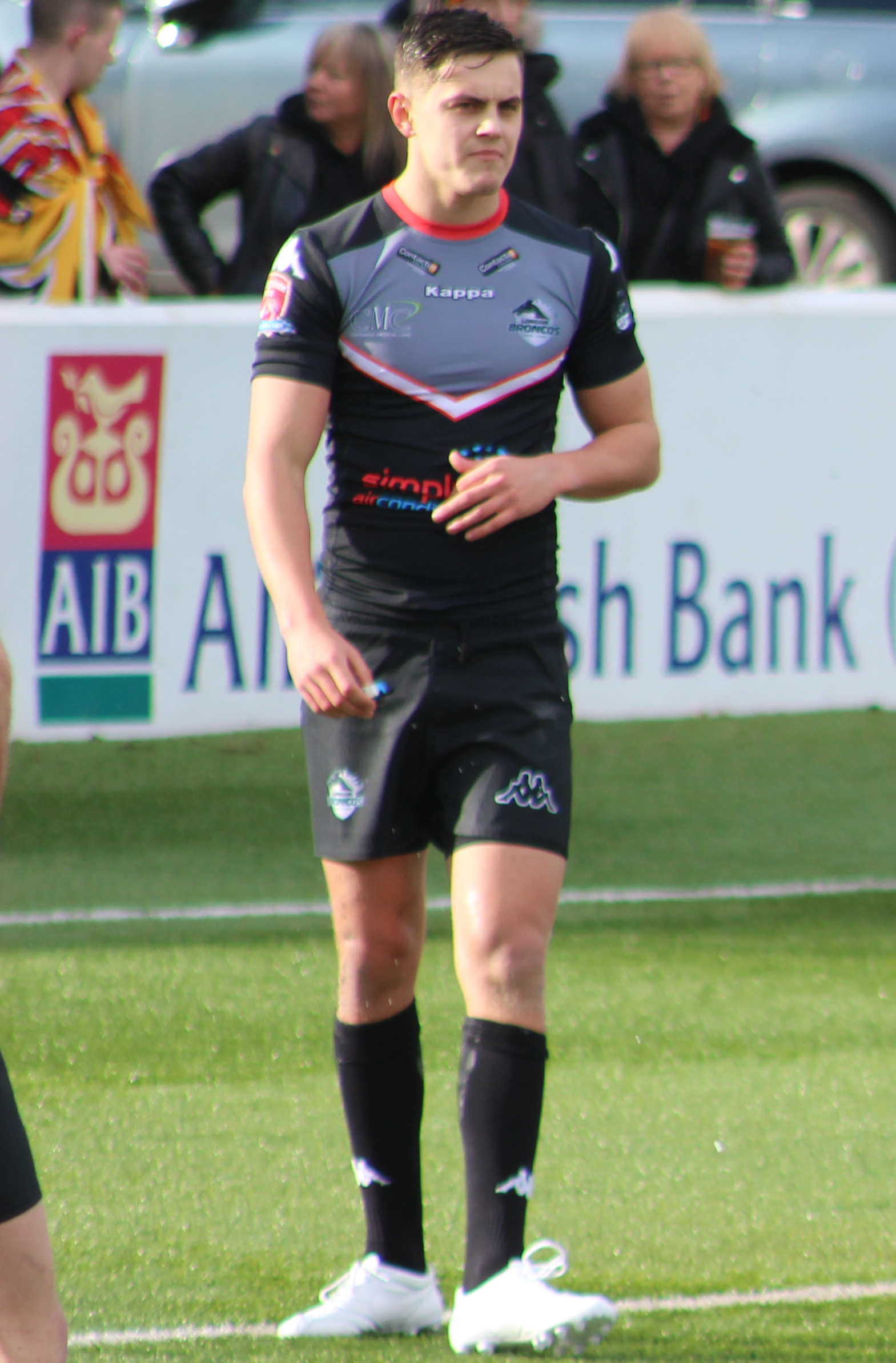

Personal information
- Full name: Alex Mitchell Walker
- Born: 4 September 1995 (age 31) Harlow, Essex, England
- Height: 6 ft 1 in (1.85 m)
- Weight: 12 st 13 lb (82 kg)

Playing information
- Position: Fullback
Club
| Years | Team | Pld | T | G | FG | P |
|---|---|---|---|---|---|---|
| 2014–19 | London Broncos | 98 | 42 | 0 | 0 | 168 |
| 2016(loan) | → London Skolars | 7 | 6 | 0 | 0 | 24 |
| 2016(loan) | → Hemel Stags | 2 | 0 | 0 | 0 | 0 |
| 2020–21 | Wakefield Trinity | 10 | 2 | 0 | 0 | 8 |
| 2021(loan) | → Featherstone Rovers | 9 | 7 | 0 | 0 | 28 |
| 2022 | Halifax Panthers | 0 | 0 | 0 | 0 | 0 |
| 2022– | London Broncos | 106 | 57 | 2 | 0 | 232 |
| | Total | 232 | 114 | 2 | 0 | 460 |
Representative
| Years | Team | Pld | T | G | FG | P |
| 2015– | Scotland | 8 | 2 | 0 | 0 | 8 |
- Source: As of 19 November 2026

Alex Walker (born 4 September 1995) is a Scotland international rugby league footballer who plays as a fullback for the London Broncos in the Super League.

He has previously played for the London Broncos in the Championship and the Super League, and spent time on loan from the Broncos at the London Skolars and the Hemel Stags in League 1.

== Background ==
Walker was born in Harlow, Essex, England.

Walker is a product of the London Broncos academy system and made his first team debut on 13 September 2014. Before joining London Broncos Academy, Walker played for Brentwood Eels RLFC as a youth player.

== Playing career ==
=== London Broncos ===
Walker made his début for the London Broncos in the Super League against the Bradford Bulls in 2014.

Walker played a pivotal role in the Broncos' successful 2018 season, the culmination of which was their 4-2 win over the Toronto Wolfpack in the Million Pound Game to earn promotion to Super League in 2019.

=== Featherstone Rovers (loan) ===
On 3 August 2021 it was reported that he had signed for Featherstone Rovers in the RFL Championship on loan until the end of the 2021 season. He scored a try on his debut against the Batley Bulldogs on 8 Aug 2021.

=== Halifax Panthers ===
On 12 November 2021 it was reported that he had signed for the Halifax Panthers in the RFL Championship.

=== London Broncos re-sign ===
In February 2022, Walker returned to London Broncos on a deal until the end of the season.

On 15 October 2023, Walker played in the London Broncos upset Championship Grand Final victory over Toulouse Olympique.

In August 2026, he was part of the Broncos squad that lifted the RFL Championship Leaders' Shield.

He played in London's 1895 Cup Final victory over the Widnes Vikings at the Halliwell Jones Stadium in August 2026.

In 2026 he was part of the London Broncos squad that secured their historic treble of League Leaders' Shield, 1895 Cup and Grand Final victories.

=== International ===
Walker made his international début for Scotland in 2015.

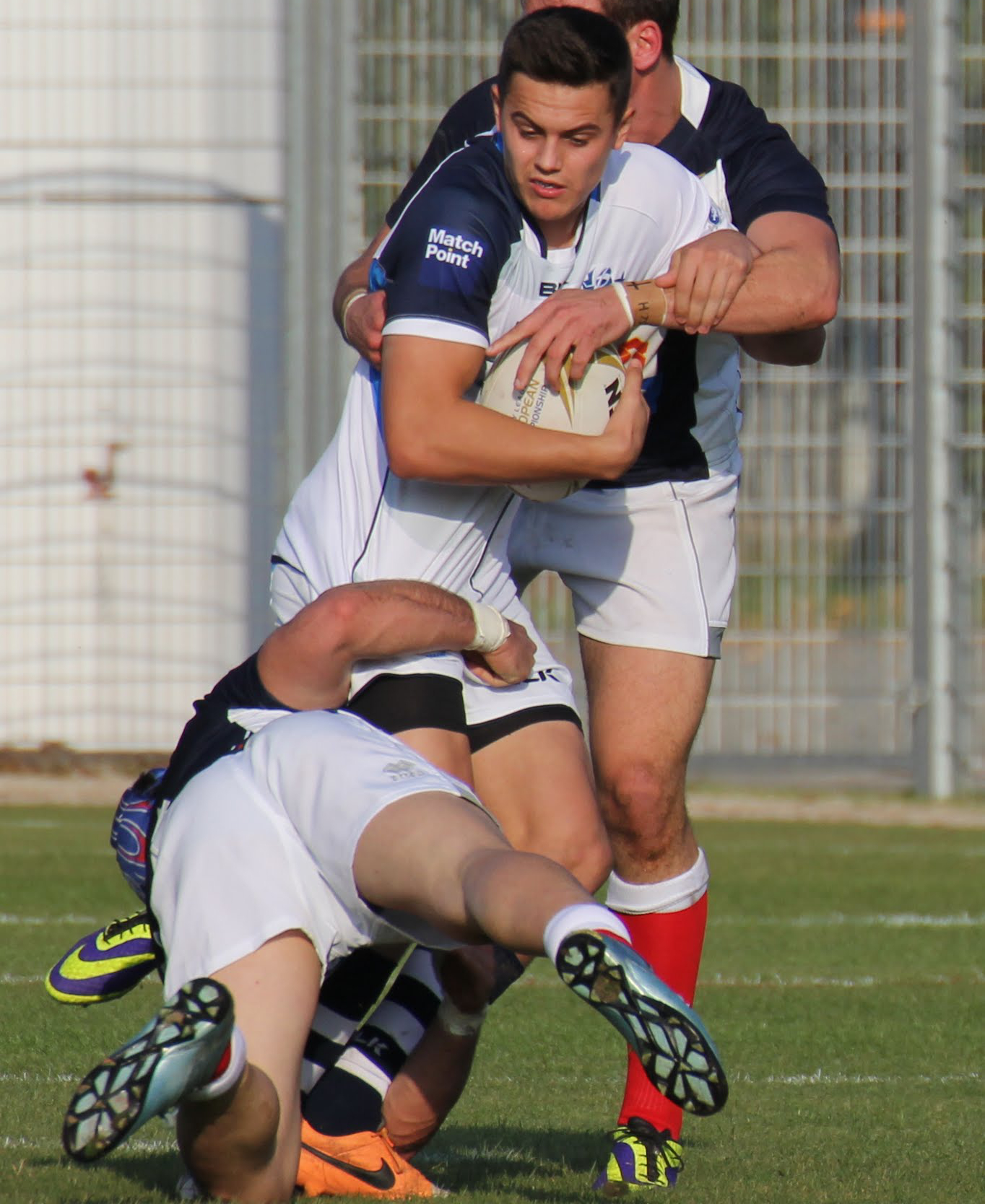
Walker playing for Scotland in 2015

== Club statistics ==
| Year | Club | League Competition | Appearances | Tries | Goals | Drop goals | Points | Notes |
|---|---|---|---|---|---|---|---|---|
| 2014 | London Broncos | 2014 Super League | 1 | 0 | 0 | 0 | 0 | |
| 2015 | London Broncos | 2015 RFL Championship | 1 | 0 | 0 | 0 | 0 | |
| 2016 | London Broncos | 2016 RFL Championship | 14 | 3 | 0 | 0 | 12 | |
| 2016 | → London Skolars | 2016 RFL League 1 | 7 | 6 | 0 | 0 | 24 | loan |
| 2016 | → Hemel Stags | 2016 RFL League 1 | 2 | 0 | 0 | 0 | 0 | loan |
| 2017 | London Broncos | 2017 RFL Championship | 25 | 13 | 0 | 0 | 52 | |
| 2018 | London Broncos | 2018 RFL Championship | 30 | 20 | 0 | 0 | 80 | |
| 2019 | London Broncos | 2019 Super League | 27 | 6 | 0 | 0 | 24 | |
| 2020 | Wakefield Trinity | 2020 Super League | 9 | 2 | 0 | 0 | 8 | |
| 2021 | Wakefield Trinity | 2021 Super League | 1 | 0 | 0 | 0 | 0 | |
| 2021 | → Featherstone Rovers | 2021 RFL Championship | 9 | 7 | 0 | 0 | 28 | loan |
| 2022 | Halifax Panthers | 2022 RFL Championship | 0 | 0 | 0 | 0 | 0 | |
| 2022 | London Broncos | 2022 RFL Championship | 23 | 14 | 0 | 0 | 56 | |
| 2023 | London Broncos | 2023 RFL Championship | 33 | 20 | 0 | 0 | 80 | |
| 2024 | London Broncos | 2024 Super League | 13 | 2 | 0 | 0 | 8 | |
| 2025 | London Broncos | 2026 RFL Championship | 26 | 9 | 1 | 0 | 38 | |
| 2026 | London Broncos | 2026 RFL Championship | 11 | 12 | 1 | 0 | 50 | |
| 2027 | London Broncos | 2027 Super League | | | | | | |
| Club career total | | | 232 | 114 | 2 | 0 | 460 | |
