= Lewis Bienek =

Ireland international rugby league footballer

Lewis "Bieno" Bienek
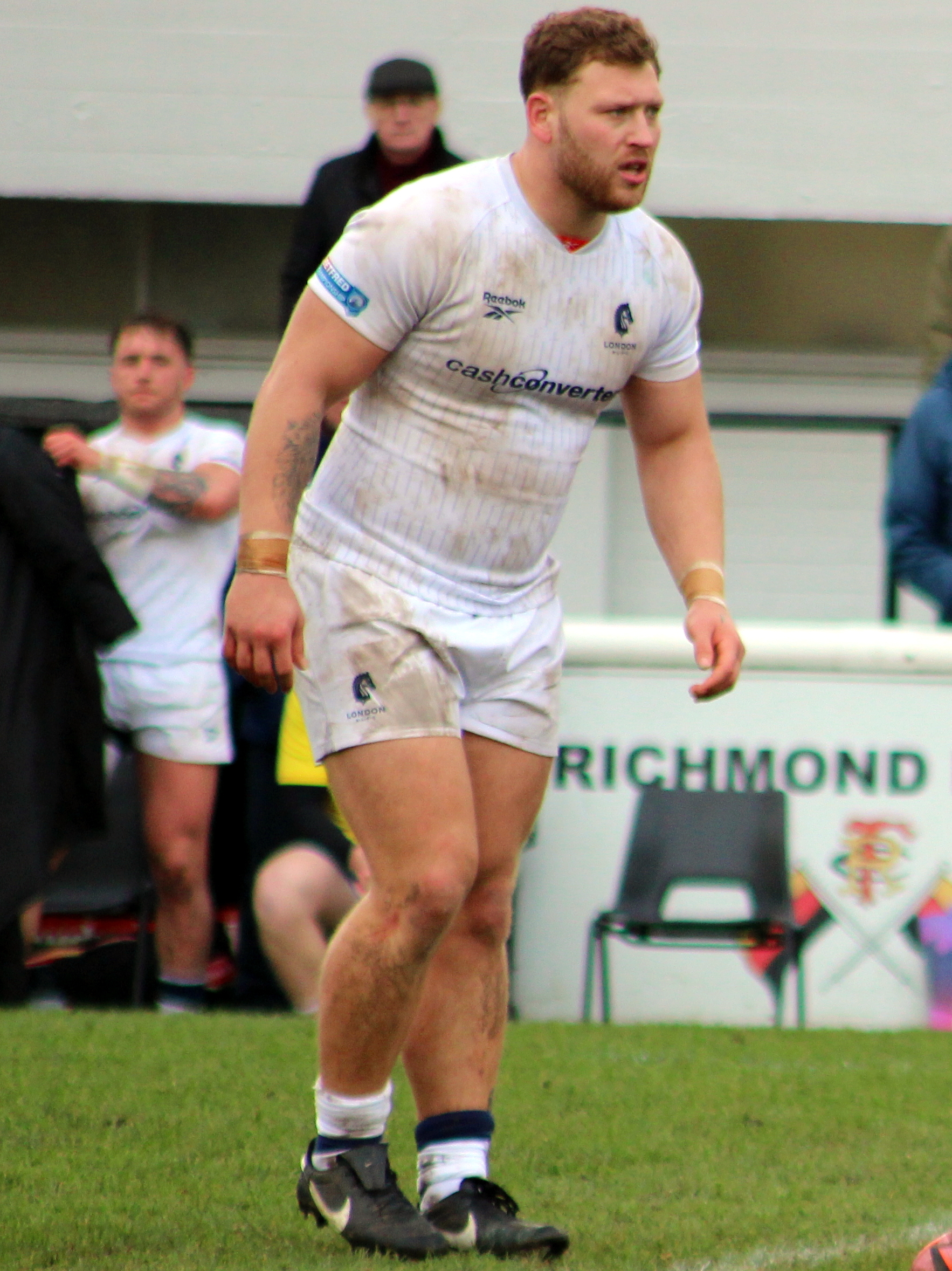

Personal information
- Full name: Lewis Bienek
- Born: 11 April 1998 (age 28) Sidcup, London, England
- Height: 6 ft 2 in (1.88 m)
- Weight: 17 st 9 lb (112 kg)

Playing information
- Position: Prop
Club
Years	Team	Pld	T	G	FG	P
2016–18	London Broncos	16	3	0	0	12
2016(loan)	→ Oxford	3	0	0	0	0
2017(loan)	→ Oxford	1	0	0	0	0
2018–20	Hull F.C.	8	0	0	0	0
2018(loan)	→ London Broncos	6	1	0	0	4
2018(loan)	→ Doncaster	4	0	0	0	0
2019(loan)	→ Batley Bulldogs	16	2	0	0	8
2020(loan)	→ Leigh Centurions	3	1	0	0	4
2021	Castleford Tigers	6	0	0	0	0
2022–	London Broncos	108	27	0	0	108
	Total	171	34	0	0	136
Representative
Years	Team	Pld	T	G	FG	P
2018–	Ireland	3	0	0	0	0
- Source: As of 19 November 2026

Lewis Bienek (born 11 April 1998) is an Ireland international rugby league footballer who plays as a prop for the London Broncos in the Super League.

He has previously played for the Broncos in the Championship, spending time on loan from London at Oxford in Kingstone Press League 1. Bienek played for Hull FC in the Super League, and spent time on loan from Hull at the London Broncos, Batley Bulldogs and the Leigh Centurions in the Championship and Doncaster in League 1. He has also played for the Castleford Tigers in the Super League.

== Background ==
Bienek was born in Sidcup, London, England.

== Playing career ==
=== London Broncos ===
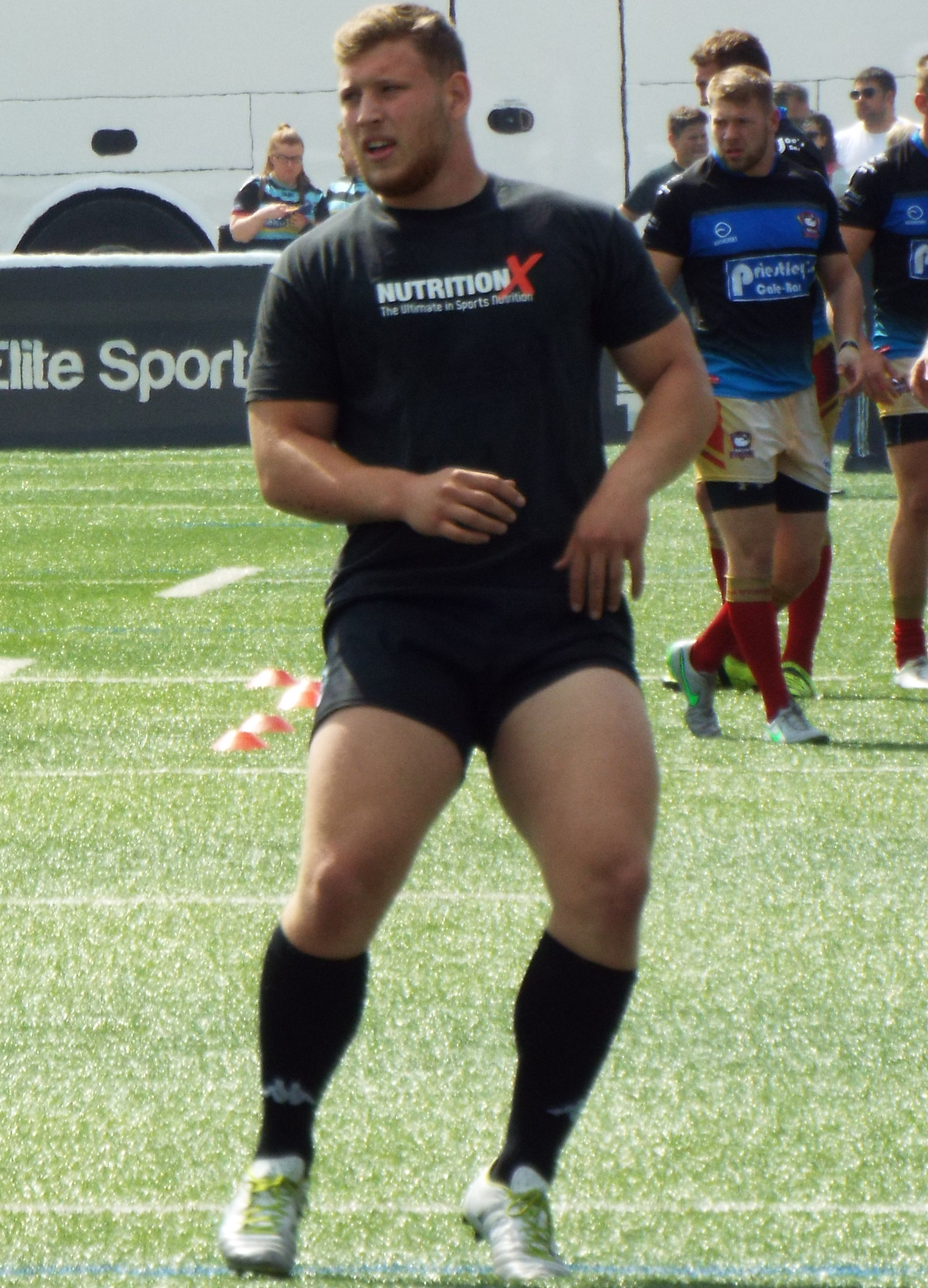
Bienek warming up for the London Broncos ahead of his professional debut in 2016

Bienek started his professional career at the London Broncos, with a short loan period at Oxford.

=== Hull FC ===
Bienek has spent the majority of his time at Hull FC out on loan to the London Broncos, Doncaster, Batley & Leigh.

=== Castleford Tigers ===
It was announced on 24 November 2020 that Bienek had joined the Castleford Tigers on an initial one-year deal. He made his Castleford début, coming off the interchange bench, on 16 Apr 2021 (Round 3) in the 52-16 home victory over the Leigh Centurions.

=== London Broncos (re-join) ===
On 15 October 2021, it was reported that he had signed for the London Broncos in the RFL Championship.

On 15 October 2023, he played in the London Broncos upset Million Pound Game victory over Toulouse Olympique.

In August 2026, he was part of the Broncos squad that lifted the RFL Championship Leaders' Shield.

He played in London's 1895 Cup Final victory over the Widnes Vikings at the Halliwell Jones Stadium in August 2026.

In October 2026, he played in the Broncos Championship Grand Final victory over Doncaster at Plough Lane.

== Club statistics ==
Year	Club	League Competition	Appearances	Tries	Goals	Drop goals	Points	Notes
2016	London Broncos	2016 RFL Championship	1	0	0	0	0	
2016	→ Oxford	2016 RFL League 1	3	0	0	0	0	loan
2017	London Broncos	2017 RFL Championship	13	3	0	0	12	
2017	→ Oxford	2017 RFL League 1	1	0	0	0	0	loan
2018	London Broncos	2018 RFL Championship	2	0	0	0	0	
2018	Hull FC	2018 Super League	7	0	0	0	0	
2018	→ London Broncos	2018 RFL Championship	6	1	0	0	4	loan
2018	Doncaster	2018 RFL League 1	4	0	0	0	0	loan
2019	Hull FC	2019 Super League	0	0	0	0	0	
2019	→ Batley Bulldogs	2019 RFL Championship	16	2	0	0	8	loan
2020	Hull FC	2020 Super League	1	0	0	0	0	
2020	→ Leigh Centurions	2020 RFL Championship	3	1	0	0	4	loan
2021	Castleford Tigers	2021 Super League	6	0	0	0	0	
2022	London Broncos	2022 RFL Championship	23	6	0	0	24	
2023	London Broncos	2023 RFL Championship	25	3	0	0	12	
2024	London Broncos	2024 Super League	16	3	0	0	12	
2025	London Broncos	2025 RFL Championship	20	7	0	0	28	
2026	London Broncos	2026 RFL Championship	24	8	0	0	32	
2027	London Broncos	2027 Super League						
Club career total			171	34	0	0	136	
