= Paul Ulberg =

Cook Islands international rugby league footballer

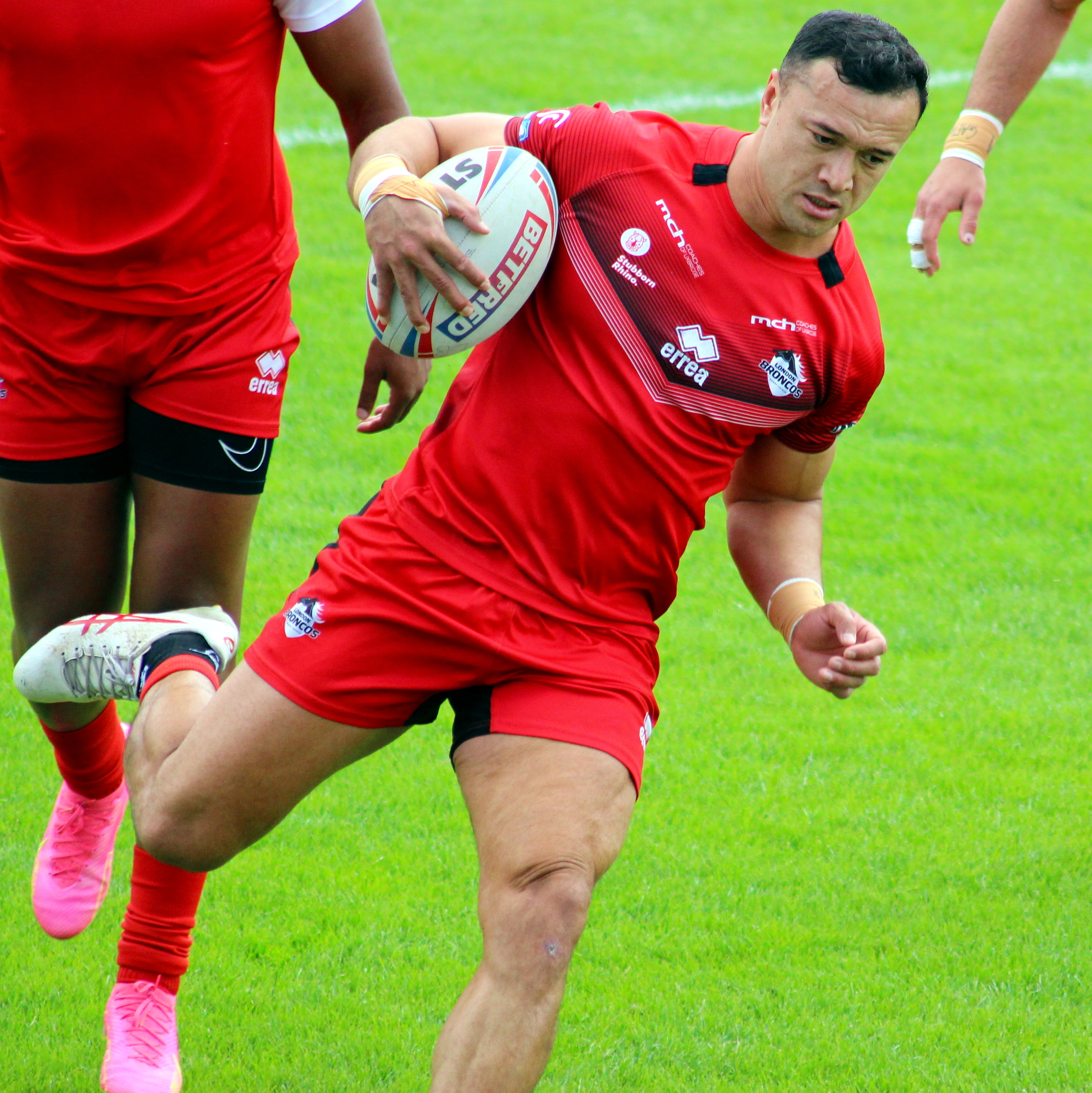

Personal information
- Full name: Paul Ulberg
- Born: 14 November 1995 (age 30) Auckland, New Zealand
- Height: 5 ft 10 in (1.79 m)
- Weight: 15 st 2 lb (96 kg)

Playing information
- Position: Wing
Club
Years	Team	Pld	T	G	FG	P
2022–23	London Broncos	50	27	0	0	108
2024–	Toulouse Olympique	54	29	0	0	112
	Total	104	56	0	0	220
Representative
Years	Team	Pld	T	G	FG	P
2019–	Cook Islands	9	5	0	0	20
2019–	Cook Islands 9s	3	1	0	0	0
- Source: As of 18 October 2026

Paul Ulberg (born 14 November 1995) is a Cook Islands international rugby league footballer who plays as a winger for Toulouse Olympique in the Super League.

He previously played for the London Broncos in the Championship.

== Background ==
Ulberg was born in Auckland, New Zealand. He is Cook Islands descent.

== Playing career ==
=== Club career ===
He came through the youth system at the New Zealand Warriors, before playing for the Norths Devils, Sunshine Coast Falcons and Wests Panthers in the Queensland Cup.

==== London Broncos ====
Ulberg joined London ahead of the 2022 season and was the top try-scorer for the Broncos in the 2022 London Broncos season.

==== Toulouse Olympique ====
On 10 November 2023, it was reported that he had signed for Toulouse Olympique in the RFL Championship on a one-year deal.

=== International career ===
In 2019 Ulberg made his international début for the Cook Islands against South Africa.

Ulberg played for the Cook Islands at the 2019 Rugby League World Cup 9s and was named in the team of the tournament.

In 2022 Ulberg was named in the Cook Islands squad for the 2021 Rugby League World Cup.
