= Kyle Evans (rugby) =

Wales international rugby league player

Personal information
- Full name: Kyle Evans
- Born: 11 September 1990 (age 36) Pyle, Wales
- Height: 6 ft 1 in (1.85 m)
- Weight: 14 st 2 lb (90 kg)

Playing information

Rugby union
- Position: Wing
Club
Years	Team	Pld	T	G	FG	P
2012–15	Llanelli	53	27	0	0	135
2012–15	Scarlets	7	1	0	0	5
2015–16	Moseley
2016–19	Merthyr
2019–22	Doncaster Knights
	Total	60	28	0	0	140

Rugby league
- Position: Wing
Club
Years	Team	Pld	T	G	FG	P
2022	Wakefield Trinity	3	1	0	0	4
2023	Featherstone Rovers	2	3	0	0	12
2023(loan)	→ London Broncos	1	0	0	0	0
	Total	6	4	0	0	16
Representative
Years	Team	Pld	T	G	FG	P
2022–	Wales	3	2	0	0	8
- Source: As of 2 June 2025

Kyle Evans (born 11 September 1990) is a Welsh professional rugby league footballer who last played as a winger for Featherstone Rovers in the Championship and Wales at international level.

Evans previously played professional rugby union for Llanelli, Moseley, Merthyr and the Doncaster Knights.

== Playing career ==
=== Rugby union ===
Evans started his career with rugby union side Llanelli. He spent three seasons with the club in the Welsh Premiership, scoring 27 tries in 57 appearances, and was called up by Scarlets to play in the Anglo-Welsh Cup.

After one season in the English Championship with Moseley, he returned to Wales in 2016, joining Merthyr. In 2018, he won the Welsh Premiership Player of the Year award.

In May 2019, Evans returned to the English Championship, signing a two-year contract with Doncaster Knights.

=== Rugby league ===
Evans spent time training with rugby league side Leeds Rhinos after being recommended to the club by Doncaster coach Francis Cummins, who had previously played for Leeds, but his spell at the club was cut short due to lockdowns during the COVID-19 pandemic.

In June 2022, Evans signed a contract with Wakefield Trinity after a successful trial. He made his début in the Super League against the Wigan Warriors.

Evans was named in the Wales squad for the 2021 Rugby League World Cup. He made his debut against Tonga, scoring Wales' only try in a 6–32 defeat.
