= Adam Vrahnos =

Greece international rugby league footballer

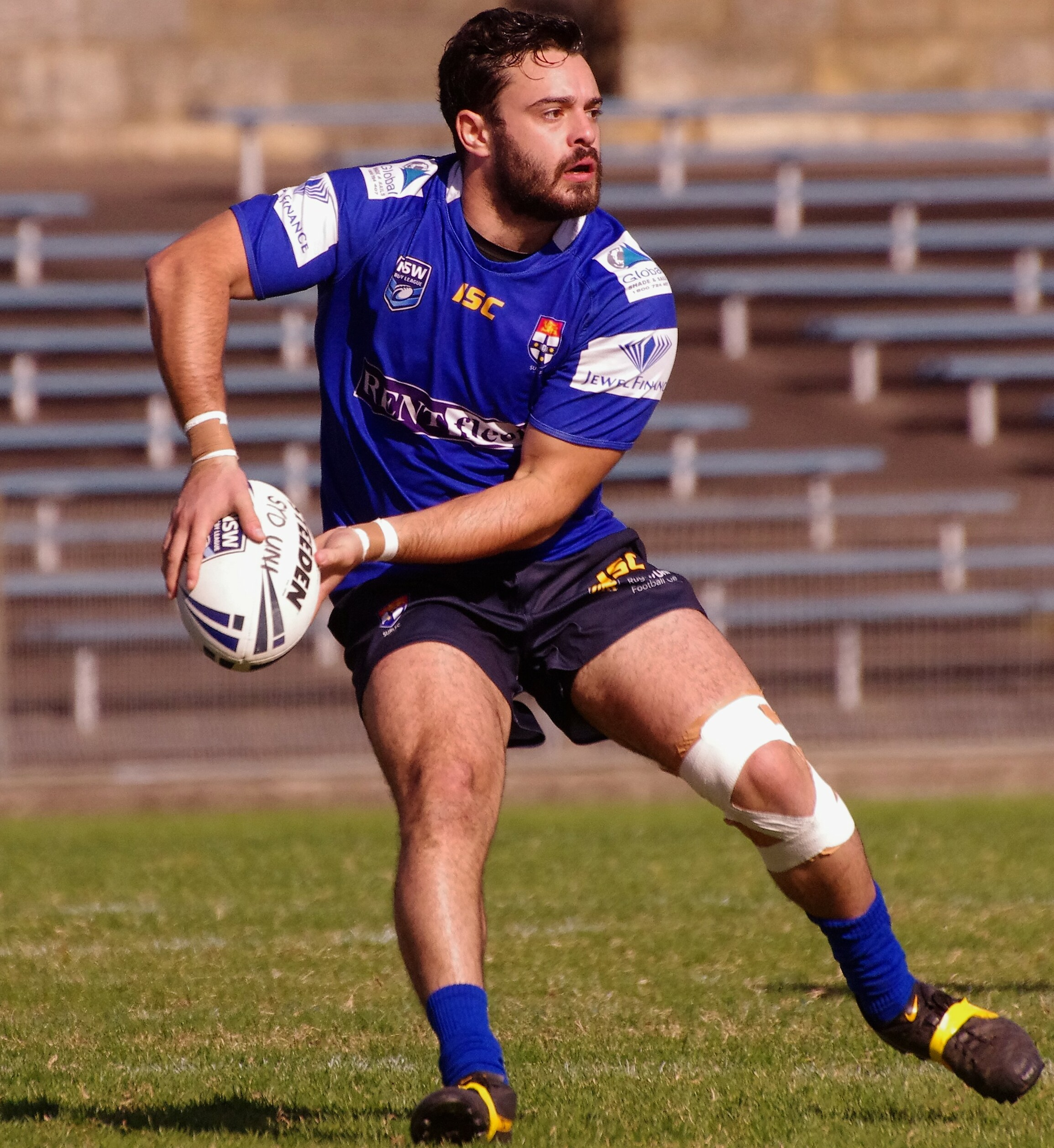

Personal information
- Full name: Adam Vrahnos
- Born: 1 October 1992 (age 33) Australia
- Height: 5 ft 10 in (1.78 m)
- Weight: 14 st 13 lb (95 kg)

Playing information
- Position: Second-row, Lock, Five-eighth
Club
| Years | Team | Pld | T | G | FG | P |
|---|---|---|---|---|---|---|
| 2021 | London Skolars | 7 | 0 | 0 | 0 | 0 |
| 2022– | London Broncos | 6 | 0 | 0 | 0 | 0 |
| 2022(loan) | → London Skolars | 6 | 3 | 0 | 0 | 12 |
| | Total | 19 | 3 | 0 | 0 | 12 |
Representative
| Years | Team | Pld | T | G | FG | P |
| 2018– | Greece | 6 | 2 | 0 | 0 | 8 |
- Source: As of 30 October 2022

Adam Vrahnos (born 1 October 1992) is a Greece international rugby league footballer who plays as a second-row forward for the London Broncos in the Championship.

He previously played for the London Skolars in League 1, and spent time on loan from the Broncos at the Skolars in League 1.

== Background ==
Vrahnos was born in Australia and is of Greek heritage.

He is a qualified solicitor.

His brother Jake Vrahnos is a fellow Greek international.

== Playing career ==
=== Club career ===
In 2021 Vrahnos joined the London Skolars in League 1

He joined the London Broncos at the start of the 2022 season.

Vrahnos spent time on loan from the Broncos at the Skolars in League 1.

=== International career ===
In 2018, Vrahnos was named in the Greece's squad for the 2018 Emerging Nations World Championship where he scored on his international début against Hungary and in the pool stage match against Vanuatu.

In 2019, He was selected for Greece's World Cup Qualification squad.

In 2022 Vrahnos was named in the Greece squad for the 2021 Rugby League World Cup, the first ever Greek Rugby League squad to compete in a World Cup.

He played his first game of the tournament, starting in the second row against Samoa.
