= Calum Gahan =

Scotland international rugby league footballer

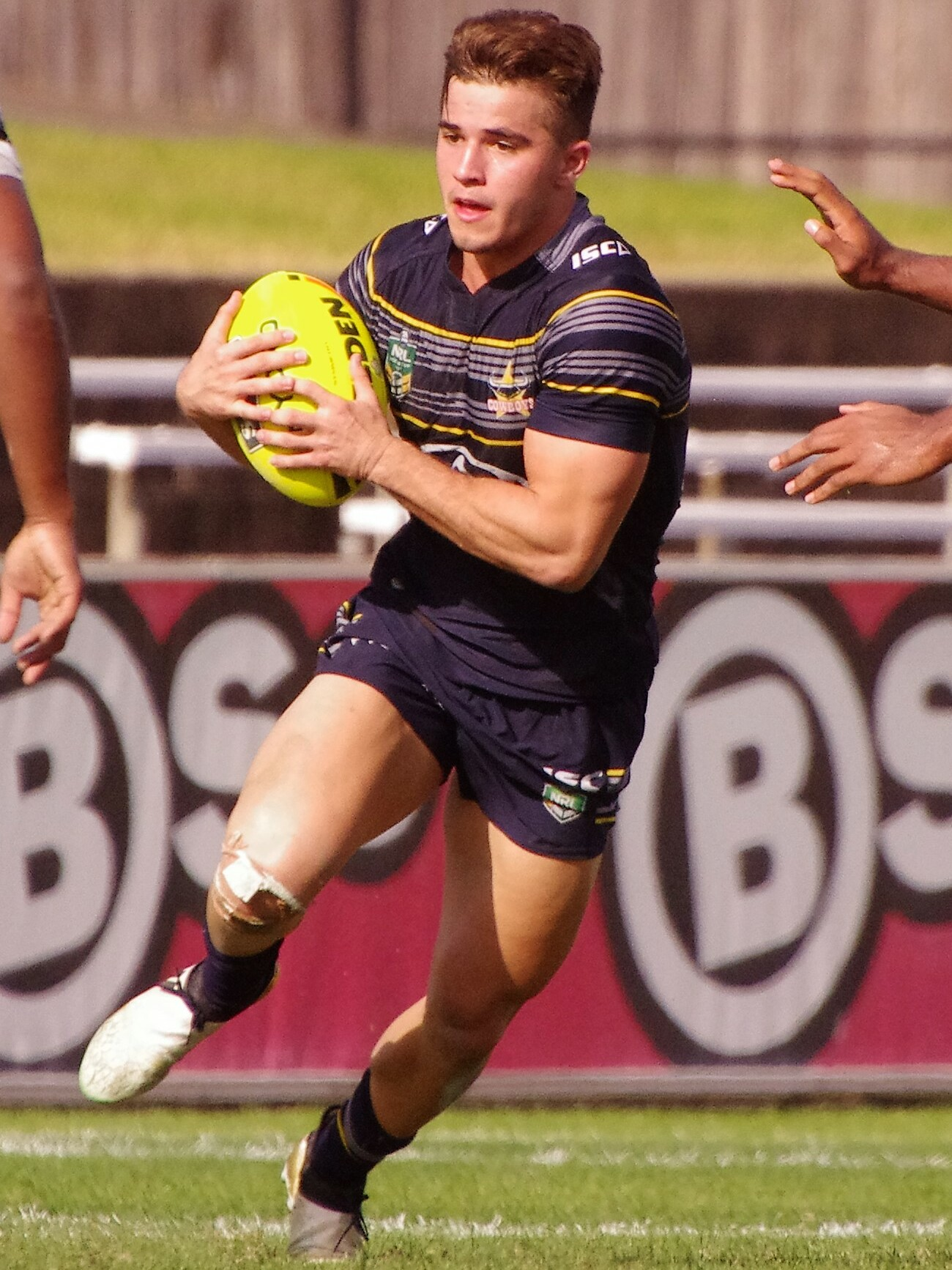

Personal information
- Full name: Calum Gahan
- Born: 23 April 1997 (age 29) Humpty Doo, Australia
- Height: 5 ft 9.5 in (177cm)
- Weight: 13 st 12 lb (88 kg)

Playing information
- Position: Hooker, Scrum-half
Club
Years	Team	Pld	T	G	FG	P
2022	London Broncos	12	4	0	0	16
2023–	Toulouse Olympique	50	5	0	0	20
	Total	62	9	0	0	36
Representative
Years	Team	Pld	T	G	FG	P
2022–	Scotland	3	0	0	0	0
- Source: As of 17 January 2026

Calum Gahan (born 23 April 1997) is a Scotland international rugby league footballer who plays as a hooker for Toulouse Olympique in the Super League.

He previously played for the London Broncos in the Championship.

== Early life ==
Gahan was born in Humpty Doo, Australia, and is of Scottish descent. Gahan attended school in Queensland.

Gahan played his junior rugby league for the Litchfield Bears and represented the Northern Territories at youth level.

== Playing career ==
=== Club career ===
Gahan came through the youth system at the North Queensland Cowboys. Between 2018 and 2021, he played for the Norths Devils in the Queensland Cup.

==== London Broncos ====
Gahan joined London at the start of the 2022 season.

==== Toulouse Olympique ====
On 3 November 2022, it was announced that Gahan had joined Toulouse Olympique for the start of the 2023 season.

In March 2025 Gahan suffered an injury to his Achilles tendon. He aigned a new contract with the club in October 2025. Coach Sylvain Houles stated, "Calum is a very good player, a great professional and a wonderful person. After his injury, it was important for us to keep him, especially after everything he has done for the club, on and off the pitch." Gahan then injured his foot, announcing the injury whilst in his fifth week of rehabilitation.

=== International career ===
In 2022 Gahan was named in the Scotland squad for the 2021 Rugby League World Cup.

In 2022 Gahan made his international debut for Scotland against the England Knights.
