= Jordan Williams (rugby league) =

English rugby league footballer (born 1997)

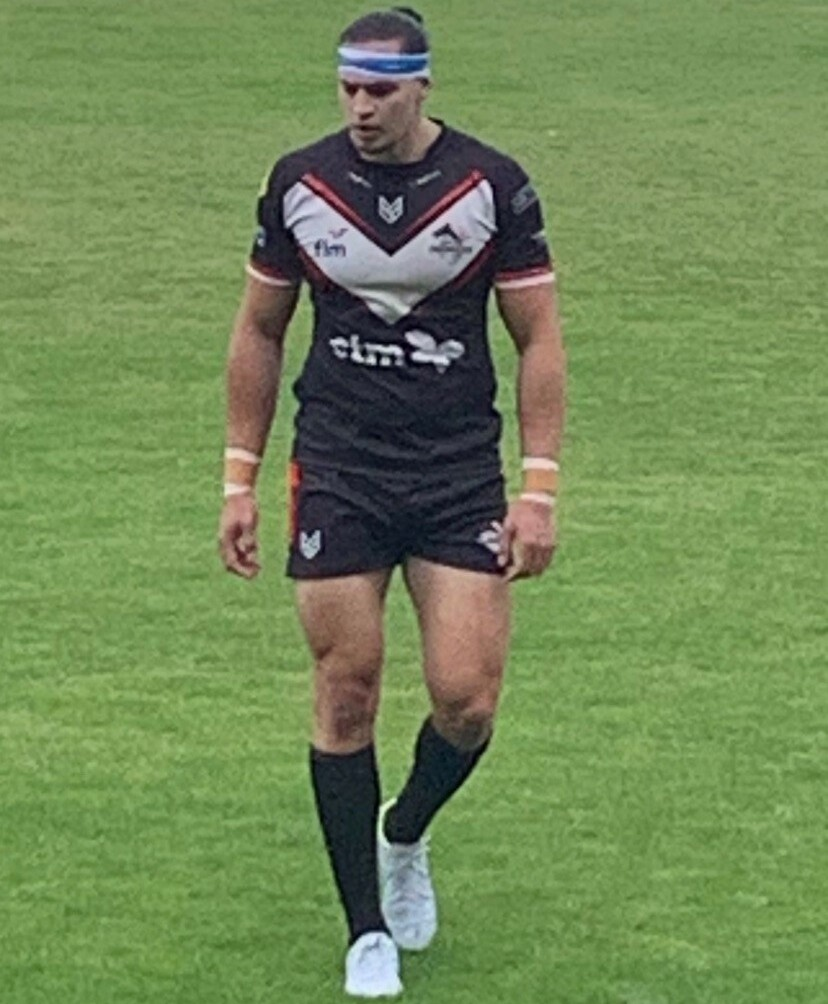

Personal information
- Full name: Jordan David Williams
- Born: 4 June 1997 (age 29) Stevenage, Hertfordshire, England
- Height: 6 ft 2 in (1.89 m)
- Weight: 16 st 1 lb (102 kg)

Playing information
- Position: Prop, Second-row
Club
Years	Team	Pld	T	G	FG	P
2016	London Broncos	0	0	0	0	0
2016(loan)	→ Oxford	2	0	0	0	0
2017–19	London Skolars	43	12	0	0	48
2020–24	London Broncos	85	9	0	0	36
2021(loan)	→ London Skolars	2	0	0	0	0
2024(loan)	→Widnes Vikings	1	0	0	0	0
2025	Featherstone Rovers	22	7	0	0	28
2026	Wakefield Trinity	3	0	0	0	0
2026(loan)	→ Batley Bulldogs	1	0	0	0	0
2027–	Leigh Leopards	0	0	0	0	0
	Total	159	28	0	0	112
- Source: As of 9 November 2026

Jordan Williams (born 4 June 1997) is an English rugby league footballer who plays as a prop or second-row for Leigh Leopards in the Super League.

He has previously played for the London Skolars in the RFL League 1.

== Background ==
Williams was born in Stevenage, Hertfordshire and grew up in the North Hertfordshire market town of Hitchin.

== Career ==
=== Early career ===
Williams played rugby union as a youth for an amateur rugby union club in Hitchin before transitioning over to rugby league with the North Herts Crusaders. Following this he went on to play for the North London representative team in the London Origin rugby league series. From there he was scouted by the London Broncos and progressed through the London Broncos Academy system from 2015 - 2017.

=== London Skolars ===
Williams joined the London Skolars in 2017 ahead of the 2017 League 1 season. He spent three seasons at the New River Stadium, featuring prominently, playing 38 times and scoring 12 tries.

=== London Broncos ===
After a successful 2019 season in North London, achieving top try scorer for the Skolars, Williams signed for the London Broncos first team at the end of 2019 and made his debut at home on 9 February 2020 against Whitehaven.

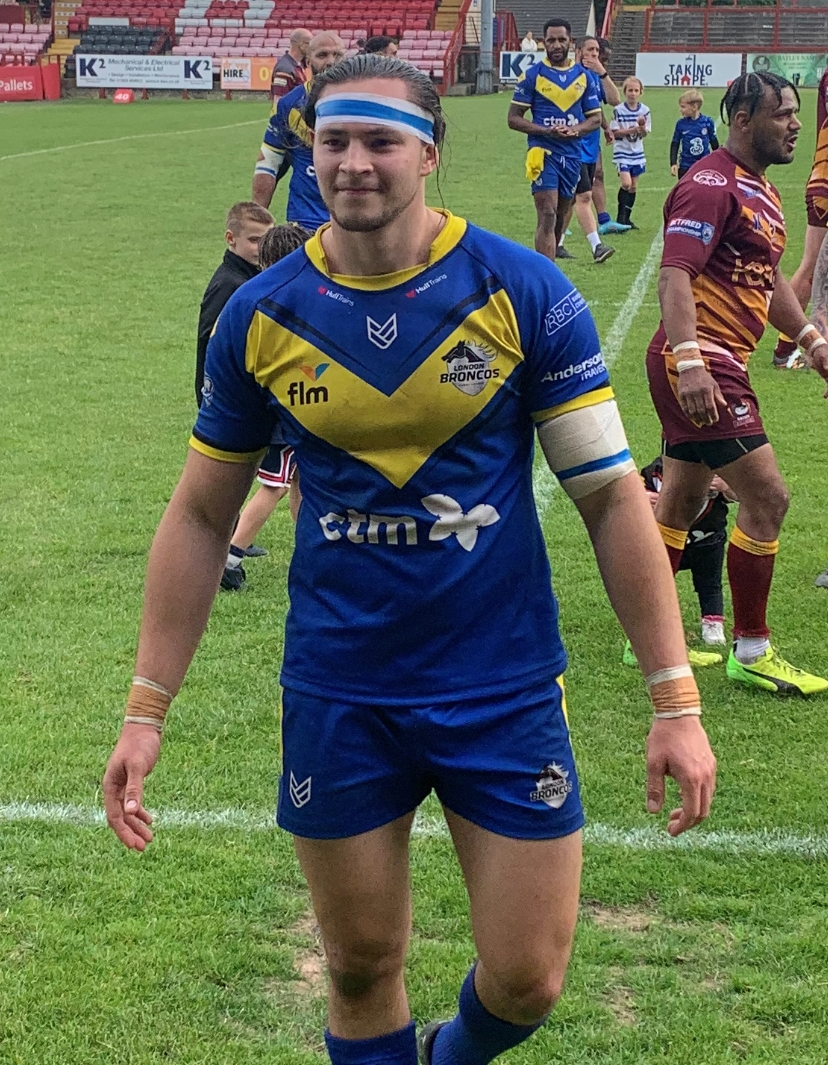
Williams playing for the Broncos in 2022

On 15 October 2023, Williams played in the London Broncos upset Million Pound Game victory over Toulouse Olympique.

=== Widnes Vikings (loan) ===
On 12 July 2024 it was reported that he had signed for Widnes in the RFL Championship on loan.

=== Featherstone Rovers ===
On 19 November 2024, it was reported that he had signed for Featherstone in the RFL Championship on a one-year deal.

=== Wakefield Trinity ===
On 14 August 2025 it was reported that he had signed for Wakefield Trinity in the Super League on a 2-year deal.

=== Batley Bulldogs (loan) ===
On 10 July 2026 it was reported that he had joined Batley Bulldogs in the RFL Championship on an initial one-week loan

=== Leigh Leopards ===
On 8 November 2026 it was reported that he had signed for Leigh Leopards in the Super League

== Club statistics ==
Year	Club	Competition	Appearances	Tries	Goals	Drop Goals	Points
2016	Oxford Rugby League	RFL League 1	2	0	0	0	0
2017	London Skolars	RFL League 1	2	0	0	0	0
2018	London Skolars	RFL League 1	19	1	0	0	4
2019	London Skolars	RFL League 1	19	11	0	0	44
2020	London Broncos	RFL Championship	3	0	0	0	0
2021	London Broncos	RFL Championship	11	0	0	0	0
2021	London Skolars	RFL League 1	2	0	0	0	0
2022	London Broncos	RFL Championship	25	4	0	0	20
2023	London Broncos	RFL Championship	33	4	0	0	20
2024	London Broncos	RFL Championship	13	1	0	0	4
2024	Widnes Vikings	RFL Championship	1	0	0	0	0
2025	Featherstone Rovers	RFL Championship	22	7	0	0	28
2026	Wakefield Trinity	Super League	3	0	0	0	0
2026	→ Batley Bulldogs (loan)	RFL Championship	1	0	0	0	0
2027	Leigh Leopards	Super League					
Club career total			159	28	0	0	112

== Honours ==
- London Skolars Player's Player of the year 2019
- London Skolars Supporter's Player of the year 2019
