= Mike Eccles =

English professional rugby league coach

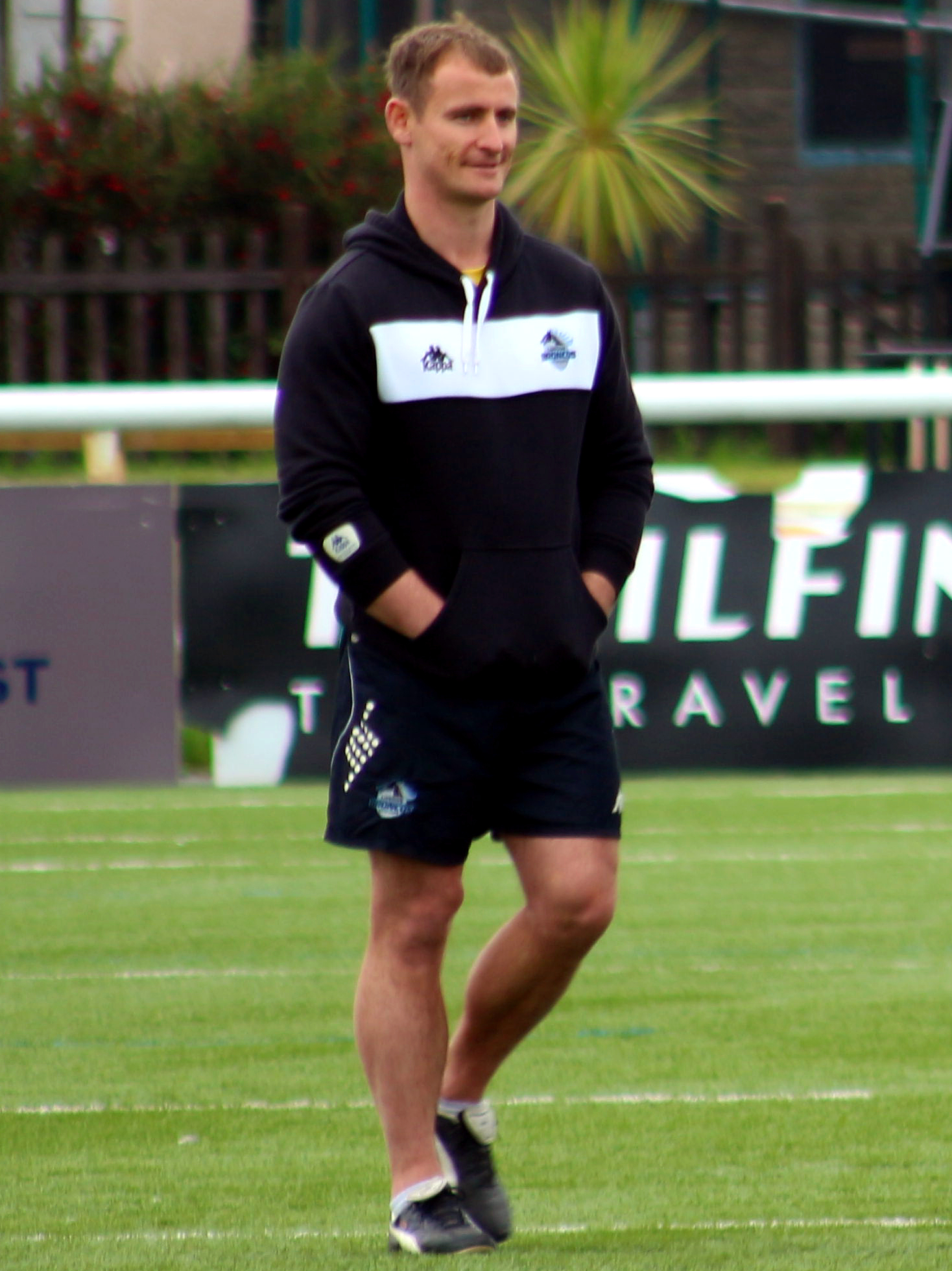

Personal information
- Full name: Michael Eccles
- Born: 5 August 1985 (age 41) Wigan, Greater Manchester, England

Coaching information
Club
Years	Team	Gms	W	D	L	W%
2022–25	London Broncos	104	41	0	63	39
- Source: As of 14 October 2026

Mike Eccles (born 5 August 1985) is an English professional rugby league coach who is the Director of Rugby & Performance at the London Broncos in the Super League.

He is the former head coach of the London Broncos when they competed in the Betfred Super League and the Championship.

== Background ==
Eccles was born in Wigan, Greater Manchester, England.

He attended Low Hall primary school in Wigan and then Gilded Hollins in Leigh. After that he went to lowton High school whilst playing rugby union for Leigh Rufc alongside David Woods formerly of Orrell and Andy Tipping, actor, from Rise of the footsoldier. He was in the Wigan Athletic football Academy as a youth. Eccles later graduated from Edge Hill University in 2007.

== Coaching career ==
Eccles joined the Salford City Reds in 2007 as Assistant Strength And Conditioning Coach. He held that position with the Super League side for three years before being promoted to the Head of Strength & Conditioning in 2011.

He joined the London Broncos in 2012 as Strength and Conditioning Coach, before heading up the department a year later. In 2016 he was promoted to the Head of Performance at the London Broncos.

Eccles replaced Jermaine Coleman in an interim capacity in May 2022, with London languishing towards the bottom of the Championship following their move to Plough Lane ahead of their 2022 season.

At the conclusion of the 2022 campaign he was given the role full time, and the title of Director of Rugby and Performance.

Eccles led the Broncos to the play-offs and was named Championship coach of the year in 2023.

In October 2023 he coached London back to the Super League, after victory in the Championship Grand Final against Toulouse Olympique in France. Under Eccles, London were relegated back to the Championship after only one season in the Super League having only won three of 27 matches.

Eccles relinquished his lead coach role after Jason Demetriou was confirmed as the new head coach of the London Broncos from the 2026 Betfred Super League season. This was confirmed after the Darren Lockyer led takeover of the London side was ratified in September 2025. He became the Director of Rugby & Performance at the Broncos.
