= List of London Broncos players =

This is a list of rugby league footballers who have played for Fulham RLFC (1980–91), London Crusaders (1991–94), London Broncos (1994–2005, 2012–present), and Harlequins RL (2006–11). Players are listed according to their heritage number as allocated by the London Broncos Supporters Society Ltd. (informally known by its original name of LBSA) (Note: LBSA was originally the acronym of the London Broncos Supporters Association of 2014, which legally registered in 2018 – under the Co-operative and Community Benefit Societies Act 2014 – as the London Broncos Supporters Society Ltd. It maintains the four-letter "LBSA", as well as "the Association", when referring to itself.) in its "London Roll of Honour". Following the disbanding of the LBSA at the end of 2024, the Roll of Honour is maintained by independent fans.

The LBSA list is separated by the season in which the players made their début with the organization.

As of the Heritage Day 2019 ceremony, marking the anniversary of the original Fulham RLFC playing its inaugural game on September 14, 1980, the LBSA has inducted 11 players to its Hall of Fame (HOF). These HOF inductees, complete with year of induction, are shown in bold on this list. Players who have played 100 games or more for the club are shown in italics.

== Men's Player List ==
=== Fulham 1980–81 ===
1. John Risman
2. Adrian Cambriani
3. Mal Aspey
4. Derek Noonan
5. Iain MacCorquodale
6. David Eckersley
7. (England) **Reg Bowden – 2014 HOF inductee**
8. Ian Van Bellen
9. Tony Karalius
10. (England) **Roy Lester – 2019 HOF inductee**
11. (England) **Tony Gourley – 2016 HOF inductee**
12. Dave Allen
13. David Hull
14. Neil Tuffs
15. John Wood
16. Harry Beverley
17. Tony Kinsey
18. Chris Ganley
19. Graham Worgan
20. Peter Souto
21. Carl Radbone
22. Martin Herdman
23. Graham Moss
24. Joe Doherty

=== Fulham 1981–82 ===
25. Steve Diamond
26. John Dalgreen
27. John Crossley, Jr.
28. Shaun Hoare
29. (Morocco) **Hussein M'Barki – 2014 HOF inductee**
30. Harold Stringer
31. Michael Walsh
32. Chris Camilleri

=== Fulham 1982–83 ===
33. Frank Feighan
34. Steve Bayliss
35. Steve Mills
36. Charlie Jones

=== Fulham 1983–84 ===
37. Trevor Stockley
38. Alan Dearden
39. Bob Jackson
40. John Butler
41. Mark Hodson
42. Jimmy Ward
43. Ray Tabern

=== Fulham 1984–85 ===
44. Andy Rippon
45. Brian Parkes
46. David Driver
47. Chris Wilkinson
48. Ken Green (Note: A player named Ken Green appears as player #48, having first played with Fullham in 1984–85. A player named Ken Green appears as player #76, having first played with Fullham in 1985–86. Rather suspicious, but the LBSA had this double entry on their official list when both Ken Greens were added to this article on 10 February 2017, and still had both Ken Greens showing as of 22 May 2023, so will keep both in this wiki article)
49. Brett Garside
50. Steve Garner
51. Lyn Evans
52. Martin Smith
53. Jeff Brown
54. Des Armitage
55. Ken Tolcher
56. Mike Burke
57. Steve Hulme
58. Paul Prendergast
59. Peter Cass
60. Paul Rochford
61. Mike Davis
62. Harold Henney
63. Don Duffy
64. George Bryan
65. John Whittaker (Note: John Whittaker, who represented both New Zealand and Cook Island on their national teams, was an active player during this period, including his 1986 appearance with Cook Island. There is no mention of Fulham in his obituary, though his obituary was not written as an exhaustive list of clubs. Thus, the John Whittaker who joined Fullham in 1984–85 may or may not be this linked New Zealander/Cook Islander.)
66. Frank Matthews
67. Glen Townsend
68. Takura Tawer
69. Ivan Kete
70. Andy Key
71. Kevin Simpson
72. Duncan Webster
73. Darren Hogg
74. Norman Barrow

=== Fulham 1985–86 ===
75. Glen Nissen
76. Ken Green
77. Alan Platt
78. Billy Platt
79. John Green
80. Bob Mordell
81. Tony O'Reilly
82. Mick Glover
83. Tony Noel
84. David Bullough
85. Gary Henley-Smith
86. Colin Meachin
87. Mal Yates
88. Wayne Millington
89. Russ Gibson
90. Phil Briscoe
91. Ian Rexson
92. Tony Cooper
93. Roger Hodson
94. Tony Looker
95. Nick Johnson
96. Brian Hunter
97. Eddie Tinsley
98. Brian Flashman

=== Fulham 1986–87 ===
99. Martin Dean
100. John Mayo
101. Andy Collier
102. Karl Bower
103. Colin Fenn
104. Greg Pratt
105. Russ Bridge
106. Gary O'Brien
107. Mark Birmingham
108. Glen Haggath
109. Gary Scott
110. Huw Rees
111. Dave Gillan
112. Kieron Murphy
113. Simon Mitchell
114. Bob Knight
115. Neil Bibby
116. Pat O'Doherty
117. Geordie Lawrie
118. Craig Taylor
119. Darren Rampling
120. Peter White
121. "??" Reynolds (Note: Three players on the official list are missing their given names: player #121, surname Reynolds, who joined Fulham in 1986–87; player #220, surname Crompton, who joined London Crusaders in 1991–92; and player #268, surname Molven, who joined London Broncos in 1994–95.)
122. Brian Rendell
123. John Fisoh
124. Nick Grimoldby
125. Steve Goyer
126. Craig Miller
127. Mike Hutchinson

=== Fulham 1987–88 ===
128. Steve Guyett
129. Santi Masa
130. Adrian Alexander
131. Dominic Cooper
132. Paul O'Riley
133. Lawrence Johannson
134. Huw Francis
135. Kevin Manning
136. Shane Kelly
137. David Aitkin
138. Paul Cheetham
139. Ian Chatterton
140. Tony Bader
141. Chris Hanson
142. Ian Wightman
143. Gerry McMullen
144. Nick Elgar
145. Justin Herbert
146. Andrew Mighty
147. Jason Wing
148. Roy Leslie
149. Noel Keating

=== Fulham 1988–89 ===
150. Brian Brown
151. Gary Lane
152. Ernie Garland
153. Bob Boyce
154. Jeff Coutts
155. Albert Helg
156. Steve Callow
157. Glen Mansfield
158. Scott Jennings
159. Mick Taylor
160. Joe Dutton
161. Dave Rotheram
162. Andrew Render
163. Andrew Zillman
164. David Baker
165. Dennis Trembath
166. Gary Braniff

=== Fulham 1989–90 ===
167. Greg Pearce
168. Ian Mellors
169. Wayne Sanchez
170. Tony Best
171. Mick Noble
172. Karl Robertson
173. Russell Browning
174. Eric Kennedy
175. Brett Williams
176. Brett Daunt
177. Tim Look
178. Darryl Pitt
179. Redvers McCabe
180. Conrad Scott
181. Rob Wright
182. Steve Roberts
183. Peter Reinsfeld

=== Fulham 1990–91 ===
184. Chris Winstanley
185. David Cruickshank
186. Doug Winborn
187. Shaun Mohr
188. Barry Peart
189. Craig Grauf
190. Mark Lee
191. Andy Stevens
192. Dazi Abdurahman
193. Tim Dwyer
194. Colin Corcoran
195. Lachlan Churchill
196. Greg Manthey
197. Brent Wilkins
198. Adam Sada
199. Kevin Holderness
200. Bernie Wilkinson
201. Richard Scarlett

=== London Crusaders 1991–92 ===
202. Shane Buckley
203. Colin Atkinson
204. Ray Ovens
205. Glen Workman
206. Ben Olsen
207. Gary Deaker
208. Francis Rolls
209. Ben Beevers
210. Adrian Why
211. Steve Rosolen
212. Nick Halafihi
213. Matt Dray
214. Tim Wilby
215. Johnny Plath
216. Wayne Boyle
217. Bernie Gilbert
218. Ryan Shaw
219. Gary Berney
220. Keiran Crompton

=== London Crusaders 1992–93 ===
221. (Australia) **Scott Roskell – 2014 HOF inductee**
222. Danny Mulkerin
223. Chris Whiteley
224. Paul Fisher
225. John Gould
226. David King
227. Richard Blackman
228. Alan Burrows
229. David Bishop
230. Grant McKenzie
231. Darryl Duncan
232. Keith Durham
233. Mark Riley
234. Alan Kimiangatau
235. Roger Draper
236. Mike Graham
237. Warren Mann
238. Bola Aiyede
239. Jason Kerapa
240. Jason Pram
241. Frank McGarran
242. Andre Sokolov
243. (South Africa) **Mark Johnson – 2014 HOF inductee**
244. Neville Ramsey
245. Ady Spencer

=== London Crusaders 1993–94 ===
246. John Gallagher
247. Abi Ekoku
248. Ian Perryment
249. Dixon McIver
250. Sam Stewart
251. Ben Matautia
252. Darren Michalski
253. Jason Walker
254. Troy Rugless
255. Scott Carter
256. Paul Chambers
257. Logan Campbell
258. Victor Trimms
259. Leo Dynevor
260. Andre Stoop
261. Geoff Luxon

=== London Broncos 1994–95 ===
262. Craig Green
263. Peter Liddell
264. Cavill Heugh
265. Mark Croston
266. Chris Smith
267. Luke Massey
268. "??" Molven
269. Paul Stevens
270. Ray McCarthy
271. Bernard Carroll
272. Justin Bryant
273. Sid Domic
274. Jon Scourfield
275. Kevin Langer
276. (Australia) **Tony Rea – 2015 HOF inductee**
277. David Harvey
278. Jason Roach
279. Dave Evans
280. Craig Booth

=== London Broncos 1995–96 ===
281. Ikram Butt
282. Shane Vincent
283. Russell Bawden
284. Neil Felton
285. Evan Cochrane
286. David O'Donnell
287. Chris McKenna
288. Tony Mestrov
289. Julian O'Neill
290. Ben Walker
291. (Australia) **Peter Gill – 2014 HOF inductee**
292. Paul Mills
293. Paul Hauff
294. Keiran Meyer
295. Terry Matterson
296. Shaun Keating
297. Craig Green
298. Junior Paul
299. Mick Francis

=== London Broncos 1996 ===
300. Greg Barwick
301. Tulsen Tollett
302. Gavin Allen
303. Duncan McRae
304. Danny Smith
305. John Minto
306. Leroy Leapai
307. Graham Strutton
308. Michael Brown
309. Mark Maguire
310. Ray Allen
311. Tony Martin
312. David Krause
313. Martin Offiah
314. Adam Ross

=== London Broncos 1997 ===
315. Paul Smith
316. Josh White
317. Matt Dunford
318. Matt Nable
319. Nick Mardon
320. Robbie Beazley
321. Roger Best
322. Shaun Edwards
323. Matt Salter
324. Mick Seaby
325. Andrew Duncan
326. Kim Howard
327. Andrew Hamilton
328. Giles Thomas
329. Iain Higgins
330. Wes Cotton
331. Kerrod Toby
332. Butch Fatnowna
333. Paul Terry

=== London Broncos 1998 ===
334. John Timu
335. Mat Toshack
336. Chris Ryan
337. Glen Air
338. Mark Carroll
339. Grant Young
340. Darren Higgins
341. (United States) **Steele Retchless – 2014 HOF inductee**
342. Damien Chapman
343. Dominic Peters
344. Luke Goodwin
345. Rob Smyth
346. Kris Chesney
347. Bart Williams
348. (United States) Shane Millard
349. Ed Jennings

=== London Broncos 1999 ===
350. Greg Fleming
351. Karle Hammond
352. Darren Bradstreet
353. Brett Warton
354. Dean Callaway
355. Robbie Simpson
356. Anthony Seibold
357. Steffan Hughes
358. Wayne Sykes
359. Scott Cram
360. Andrew Wynyard
361. David Long

=== London Broncos 2000 ===
362. Frank Napoli
363. Danny Moore
364. Justin Dooley
365. Andy Johnson
366. Paul Davidson
367. Brendan Magnus
368. Jon Clarke
369. Steve Barrow
370. Kevin Crouthers
371. Peter Lupton
372. Jon Roper
373. George Truelove
374. Yusef Sozi
375. Olu Iwenofu

=== London Broncos 2001 ===
376. Nigel Roy
377. Marvin Golden
378. Michael Gillett
379. Dennis Moran
380. Jason Hetherington
381. Jim Dymock
382. Richie Barnett
383. Iain Morrison
384. Paul Sykes
385. Rob Parker
386. Sylvain Houles
387. Kris Smith
388. Dan Potter

=== London Broncos 2002 ===
389. Steve Hall
390. Wayne Evans
391. Richard Marshall
392. (England) **Rob Purdham – 2014 HOF inductee**
393. Rob Jackson
394. Neil Budworth
395. Francis Stephenson
396. Richard Moore
397. Alex Wilkinson
398. Jonny Hepworth
399. Darren Shaw
400. Gareth Price
401. Gareth Dean

=== London Broncos 2003 ===
402. Chris Thorman
403. Mark Cox
404. Tommy Haughey
405. Jamie Fielden
406. Nicky Johnson
407. Bill Peden
408. Andrew King
409. Austin Buchanan
410. Karl Long
411. Damien Kennedy
412. Tommy Gallagher
413. Jason Netherton
414. (Zaire) Joe Mbu
415. (Australia) Steve Trindall
416. (Australia) Joel Caine
417. (Scotland) Dave McConnell

=== London Broncos 2004 ===
418. (England) Jon Wells
419. (United States) Mark O'Halloran
420. (England) Radney Bowker
421. (Australia) Andrew Hart
422. (England) Andrew Brocklehurst
423. (Scotland) Mitch Stringer
424. Lee Sanderson
425. (England) Lee Greenwood
426. Andy McNally
427. (England) Scott Murrell
428. Dave Highton
429. Johnny Williams
430. (England) Dwayne Barker
431. (Wales) Steve Thomas
432. (England) John Kirkpatrick
433. (England) Liam Botham
434. (Niue) Zebastian Lucky Luisi
435. (Tonga) Malupo Kaufusi
436. (England) Paul Sampson
437. (Nigeria) Ade Adebisi

=== London Broncos 2005 ===
438. (Fiji) Nick Bradley-Qalilawa
439. (New Zealand) Thomas Leuluai
440. (Australia) **Luke Dorn – 2019 HOF inductee**
441. (Australia) Mark Tookey
442. (Australia) Mark McLinden
443. (Tonga) Solomon Haumono
444. (Australia) Lee Hopkins
445. (Tonga) Tyrone Smith
446. (Tonga) Filimone Lolohea
447. Anthony Armour
448. (Ireland) Danny Williams
449. (Tonga) Feleti Mateo
450. (England) Carl Ablett
451. (Cook Islands) Karl Temata

=== Quins RL 2006 ===
452. (Malta) Matt Gafa
453. (England) Rikki Sheriffe
454. (Ireland) Pat Weisner
455. (Scotland) Daniel Heckenberg
456. (Wales) David Mills
457. (England) Tony Clubb
458. (Australia) Chad Randall
459. (England) Tim Hartley
460. (England) Louie McCarthy-Scarsbrook
461. (New Zealand) Henry Paul
462. (England) Michael Worrincy
463. (England) Paul Noone
464. (Ireland) Anthony Stewart

=== Quins RL 2007 ===
465. (England) Chris Melling
466. (Australia) Scott Hill
467. (England) Danny Orr
468. (France) Julien Rinaldi
469. (England) Jon Grayshon
470. (England) Andy Smith
471. (England) Joe Walsh
472. (England) Luke Burgess
473. (England) Steven Bannister

=== Quins RL 2008 ===
474. (Australia) David Howell
475. (England) Danny Ward
476. (Ireland) Gareth Haggerty
477. (England) Will Sharp
478. (Jamaica) Lamont Bryan
479. (England) Adam Janowski
480. (Ireland) Jamie O'Callaghan
481. (England) David Tootill
482. (Australia) Dylan Skee
483. (England) Dave Williams

=== Quins RL 2009 ===
484. (Australia) Luke Williamson
485. (Australia) Chad Robinson
486. (England) Ben Kaye
487. (Ireland) Jason Golden
488. (England) Luke Gale
489. (England) Matt Gardner
490. (England) Sam Thompson
491. (England) Ryan Esders
492. (England) Luke May

=== Quins RL 2010 ===
493. (England) Ben Jones-Bishop
494. (Scotland) Oliver Wilkes
495. (Wales) Matt James
496. (England) Ben Bolger
497. (England) Martyn Smith
498. (England) Max Edwards
499. (England) Kyle Bibb
500. (England) Kevin Penny
501. (England) Ben Jones
502. (England) Andy Ellis
503. (Albania) Olsi Krasniqi

=== Quins RL 2011 ===
504. (England) Mike Burnett
505. (Australia) Chris Bailey
506. (Ireland) Luke Ambler
507. (Greece) Nick Kouparitsas
508. (Jamaica) Karl Pryce
509. (England) Mark Calderwood
510. (England) Joe Mellor
511. (England) Rob Thomas
512. (England) Lee Mitchell
513. (England) Dan Sarginson
514. (England) Chris Riley
515. (England) Kyle Briggs

=== London Broncos 2012 ===
516. (Scotland) Michael Robertson
517. (England) Liam Colbon
518. (England) Kieran Dixon
519. (Australia) Michael Witt
520. (Australia) Craig Gower
521. (Tonga) Antonio Kaufusi
522. (Australia) Shane Rodney
523. (Australia) Mark Bryant
524. (England) Matt Cook
525. (Jamaica) Omari Caro
526. (England) Sam Bolger
527. (Wales) Michael Channing
528. (England) Scott Wheeldon
529. (England) Will Lovell
530. (England) Mike McMeeken

=== London Broncos 2013 ===
531. (Scotland) Alex Hurst
532. (England) Tommy Lee
533. (Scotland) Ben Fisher
534. (Jamaica) James Woodburn-Hall
535. (Albania) Erjon Dollapi
536. (England) Shane Grady
537. (Ireland) James Mendeika
538. (England) Mike Bishay
539. (England) Harry Little
540. (England) Jacob Fairbank
541. (England) Joel Wicks
542. (Australia) Jamie Soward
543. (Wales) Rhodri Lloyd
544. (England) Iliess Macani
545. (Jamaica) Mason Caton-Brown

=== London Broncos 2014 ===
546. (Tonga) Nesiasi Mataitonga
547. (Australia) Jordan Atkins
548. (England) Thomas Minns
549. (France) Tony Gigot
550. (England) Carl Forster
551. (England) Scott Moore
552. (England) Alex Foster
553. (England) James Cunningham
554. (England) George Griffin
555. (England) James Duckworth
556. (Australia) Ben Farrar
557. (Australia) Josh Drinkwater
558. (Australia) Nick Slyney
559. (England) James Greenwood
560. (Samoa) Denny Solomona
561. (Tonga) Atelea Vea
562. (Malta) (Jamaica) Jonathan Magrin (né Wallace)
563. (France) Maxime Herold
564. (Ireland) Joe Keyes
565. (Scotland) Oscar Thomas
566. (England) Toby Everett
567. (Scotland) Alex Walker

=== London Broncos 2015 ===
568. (England) Richard Mathers
569. (Wales) Rhys Williams
570. (Fiji) Wes Naiqama
571. (Scotland) Ben Hellewell
572. (Italy) Ray Nasso
573. (Australia) Josh Cordoba
574. (Australia) Daniel Harrison
575. (Scotland) Rhys Lovegrove
576. (England) Matt Garside
577. (England) Brad Dwyer
578. (Malta) Jarrod Sammut
579. (England) Tom Gilmore
580. (England) Jamie Thackray
581. (England) Sean Morris
582. (Scotland) Harvey Burnett
583. (England) Elliot Minchella
584. (Wales) Elliot Kear
585. (England) Chris Annakin
586. (Scotland) Andrew Henderson
587. (England) Matt Davis
588. (Scotland) Jonny Walker
589. (France) William Barthau
590. (England) Glenn Riley
591. (England) Jason Walton
592. (England) Ben Gray
593. (England) Ben Pointer
594. (Nigeria) Sadiq Adebiyi

=== London Broncos 2016 ===
595. (Australia) Nathan Stapleton
596. (England) Andy Ackers
597. (England) Jack Bussey
598. (Australia) Mark Ioane
599. (England) Eddie Battye
600. (England) Scott Leatherbarrow
601. (United States) Mark Offerdahl
602. (Papua New Guinea) Israel Eliab
603. (Ireland) Api Pewhairangi
604. (England) Callum Bustin
605. (Ireland) Lewis Bienek
606. (England) Kam Pearce-Paul

=== London Broncos 2017 ===
607. (Australia) Adrian Purtell
608. (England) Tom Spencer
609. (England) Jay Pitts
610. (Fiji) Junior Roqica
611. (England) Matty Gee
612. (Wales) Ben Evans
613. (England) Lewis Foster
614. (France) John Boudebza
615. (England) Sam Wilde

=== London Broncos 2018 ===
616. (England) James Meadows
617. (England) Sam Davis
618. (England) Jordan Johnstone
619. (England) Matty Fleming
620. (England) Rob Butler
621. (Jamaica) Jacob Ogden
622. (England) Daniel Hindmarsh
623. (England) Matty Davies
624. (France) Éloi Pélissier

=== London Broncos 2019 ===
625. (England) Jordan Abdull
626. (England) Greg Richards
627. (Wales) Matty Fozard
628. (England) Nathan Mason
629. (Australia) Luke Yates
630. (Australia) Ryan Morgan
631. (England) Morgan Smith
632. (Australia) Brock Lamb
633. (England) Guy Armitage

=== London Broncos 2020 ===
634. (England) Tuoyo Egodo
635. (England) Cory Aston
636. (France) Rhys Curran
637. (England) Josh Walters
638. (England) Dan Norman
639. (England) Jordan Williams
640. (England) Olly Ashall-Bott
641. (England) Josh Hodson
642. (England) Will Blakemore
643. (Ireland) Ed Chamberlain
644. (Australia) Mitch Allgood

=== London Broncos 2021 ===
645. (England) Gideon Boafo
646. (England) Chris Hankinson
647. (Lebanon) Abbas Miski
648. (France) Romain Navarette
649. (England) Jacob Jones
650. (Zimbabwe) Titus Gwaze
651. (Tonga) Paulos Latu
652. (England) Oliver Leyland
653. (England) Rian Horsman

=== London Broncos 2022 ===
654. (Wales) Dalton Grant
655. (Wales) Jude Ferreira
656. (England) Lameck Juma
657. (England) Dan Coates
658. (Italy) Dean Parata
659. (Philippines) Mike Greenhalgh
660. (England) Brad Foster
661. (Italy) Ronny Palumbo
662. (Greece) Rob Tuliatu
663. (Fiji) Sitiveni Moceidreke
664. (Australia) Will Ramsey
665. (Australia) Jacob Thomas
666. (Greece) Adam Vrahnos
667. (Cook Islands) Paul Ulberg
668. (Scotland) Calum Gahan (Note: As of 23 May 2023, the pdf list available at the LBSA website ends in February 2022 (...uploads/2022/02/London-Roll-of-Honour.pdf), ending with player #668 Calum Gahan. The LBSA html website is updated on a more consistent basis, and as of 23 May 2023 includes later 2022 additions #669 Amir Bourouh through #678 Sam Hall, as well as 2023 additions #679 Jarred Bassett through #684 Harvie Hill. Cut and paste from the pdf is much easier, so the ref to that LBSA link has been kept in this article.)
669. (England) Amir Bourouh
670. (France) Dane Chisholm
671. (Papua New Guinea) Wellington Albert
672. (England) Neil Thorman
673. (England) Dan Hoyes
674. (Italy) Brock Pelligra
675. (England) Max Allen
676. (England) Bill Leyland
677. (England) Euan Parke
678. (England) Sam Hall

=== London Broncos 2023 ===
679. (Australia) Jarred Bassett
680. (Italy) Ethan Natoli
681. (Brazil) Ramon Silva
682. (England) Marcus Stock
683. (England) Zach Eckersley
684. (England) Harvie Hill
685. (England) Jensen Monk
686. (Fiji) Henry Raiwalui
687. (Papua New Guinea) Emmanuel Waine
688. (New Zealand) Dean Whare
689. (Wales) Kyle Evans
690. (England) Harry Stevens
691. (England) Kieran Tyrer
692. (England) Jacob Gannon
693. (England) Harvey Makin
694. (Australia) Corey Norman

=== London Broncos 2024 ===
695. (England) Lee Kershaw
696. (England) Robbie Storey
697. (France) Hakim Miloudi
698. (Italy) Jack Campagnolo
699. (Australia) Rhys Kennedy
700. (England) Fenton Rogers
701. (England) Reiss Butterworth
702. (England) Jack Hughes
703. (England) Joe Stocks
704. (France) Ugo Tison
705. (England) Josh Rourke

=== London Broncos 2025 ===
706. (England) Jerome Yates
707. (Jamaica) Chris Ball
708. (Jamaica) Aaron Small
709. (England) Leighton Ball
710. (England) Jack Ryan
711. (Australia) Connor O'Beirne
712. (Wales) Huw Worthington
713. (Wales) Curtis Davies
714. (Italy) Luke Polselli
715. (England) Ben Hursey-Hord
716. (England) Matt Ross
717. (England) Kian McDermott
718. (France) Christopher Hellec
719. (England) Zac Bardsley-Rowe
720. (England) Jake Thewlis
721. (England) Lukas Mason
722. (England) Liam Tindall
723. (England) Taylor Kerr
724. (England) Jenson Binks
725. (England) Alfie Johnson
726. (England) Tom Whitehead
727. (Ireland) Sam Winney
728. (Ireland) Louix Gorman
729. (England) Ted Davidson
730. (England) Lennie Ellis
731. (England) Jack Farrimond
732. (England) Connor Barley
733. (England) Jack Smith
734. (England) Kalum Rathbone
735. (Australia) Brandon Webster-Mansfield
736. (England) Joe Diskin
737. (England) Tommy Porter
738. (Nigeria) Daniel Okoro
739. (England) Charlie Robson
740. (Australia) Kobe Rugless
741. (England) Marcus Qareqare
742. (England) Max Wood

=== London Broncos 2026 ===
743. (Papua New Guinea) Morea Morea
744. (England) Elliot Wallis
745. (Papua New Guinea) Robert Mathias
746. (Papua New Guinea) Alex Max
747. (England) Neil Tchamambe
748. (Australia) Dean Hawkins
749. (Australia) Reagan Campbell-Gillard
750. (Tonga) Siliva Havili
751. (Papua New Guinea) Epel Kapinias
752. (Australia) Luke Smith
753. (England) Jack Croft
754. (Tanzania) Emarly Bitungane
755. (Papua New Guinea) Gairo Voro
756. (Papua New Guinea) Finley Glare
757. (England) Bobby Hartley
758. (Papua New Guinea) Jeremiah Simbiken
759. (England) Jake Ramsden
760. (England) Will Jones
761. (Scotland) Henry Lenthall
762. (England) Jamie Hewson
763. (England) Finley Hay

== Women's Player List ==
=== London Broncos 2021 ===
1. Beth Pickernell
2. Catherine Robinson
3. Abi Gordon
4. Rosie Cairns
5. Shauna Mann
6. Courtney Treco
7. Vicki Jackson
8. Jamie Blazejewski
9. Jess Ingram
10. Tracey Smith
11. Kaye Selby
12. Ruth Mottershead
13. Ella Jade Twyman
14. Ioana McCusker
15. Caity Clifton
16. Georgia Gray
17. Emily Hughes
18. Kathryn Salter
19. Sharnie Saunders (née Pokai)
20. Hari McCormack
21. Siobhan Longdon-Hughes
22. Emelie Hellgren
23. Laura Cook
24. Kirsty-Lee Griffiths
25. Faye Hamp
26. Helena Duggan
27. Hannah Croucher
28. Kirsty Long
29. Sophie Messem

=== London Broncos 2022 ===
30. Sophie Tauchert
31. Ellie Taylor
32. Roisin Healy
33. Sue Neuman
34. Lauren Mueller
35. Rachel Humphreys
36. Carys Evans
37. Tatum Giabrese (née Gabriel)
38. Beth McFarlane
39. Katie Wallis
40. Cassie Benyon

=== London Broncos 2023 ===
41. Nicole Kennedy
42. Ellie Hunt-Pain
43. Comfort Ilozobhie
44. Joanna Sawyer
45. Andrea Mena
46. Rebecca Jackson
47. Oli Davies
48. Fred Jaeger
49. Rebecca Kemball
50. Tess Littleton
51. Cat Moody
52. Natalie Munroe
53. Frankie Woolf

=== London Broncos 2024 ===
54. Becky Smart
55. Jemma King
56. Corin Burch
57. Abbie Mason
58. Grace McLauchlan
59. Jaz Rampton
60. Polly Roberts
61. Letizia Minazzato
62. Karina Gauto
63. Amy Howard
64. Claire Kennedy
