= 1983–84 Fulham RLFC season =

- 1983–84 RFL season Rank: 13th
- Challenge Cup: Second Round
- 1983–84 record: Wins: 11; draws: 1; losses: 21
- Points scored: For: 401; against: 694

Team information
- Chairman: Ernie Clay
- Player Coach: Reg Bowden
- Captain: Reg Bowden
- Stadium: Craven Cottage
- Avg. attendance: 2285
- High attendance: 3838 vs. Hull F.C.

Top scorers
- Tries: Hussein M'Barki - 17
- Goals: Steve Diamond - 77
- Points: Steve Diamond - 177
Home colours
← 1982–83	List of seasons	1984–85 →

The 1983–84 Fulham RLFC season was the fourth in the club's history. They competed in the 1983–84 Championship in the Rugby Football League. They also competed in the 1983–84 Challenge Cup and the 1983–84 League Cup. They finished the season in 13th place and were relegated from the top tier of professional rugby league in the UK.

== Championship ==
Final Standings

	Team	Pld	W	D	L	PF	PA	PD	Pts
1	Hull Kingston Rovers	30	22	2	6	795	421	+374	46
2	Hull F.C.	30	22	1	7	831	401	+430	45
3	Warrington	30	19	2	9	622	528	+94	40
4	Castleford	30	18	3	9	686	438	+248	39
5	Widnes	30	19	1	10	656	457	+199	39
6	St Helens	30	18	1	11	649	507	+142	37
7	Bradford Northern	30	17	2	11	519	379	+140	36
8	Leeds	30	15	3	12	553	514	+39	33
9	Wigan	30	16	0	14	533	465	+68	32
10	Oldham	30	15	2	13	544	480	+64	32
11	Leigh	30	14	0	16	623	599	+24	28
12	Featherstone Rovers	30	11	2	17	464	562	-98	24
13	Fulham	30	9	1	20	401	694	-293	19
14	Wakefield Trinity	30	7	0	23	415	780	-365	14
15	Salford	30	5	0	25	352	787	-435	10
16	Whitehaven	30	3	0	27	325	956	-631	6

== 1983-84 squad ==
Name	Appearances	Tries	Goals	Drop Goals	Points
Dave Allen	26	5	0	0	20
Steve Bayliss	25	8	0	0	32
Harry Beverley	26	0	0	0	0
Reg Bowden	32	0	0	0	0
John Butler	1	0	0	0	0
Adrian Cambriani	7	2	0	0	8
John Crossley	25	6	0	0	24
John Dalgreen	7	0	0	0	0
Alan Dearden	22	1	0	0	4
Steve Diamond	35	5	77	3	177
Joe Doherty	31	2	0	0	8
David Eckersley	15	1	0	1	5
Chris Ganley	10	1	0	0	4
Tony Gourley	25	0	0	0	0
Martin Herdman	16	2	0	0	8
Sean Hoare	14	0	0	0	0
Mark Hodson	1	0	0	0	0
David Hull	24	4	0	0	16
Bob Jackson	8	1	0	0	4
Charlie Jones	21	1	0	0	4
Tony Kinsey		3	0	9	21
Roy Lester	2	0	0	0	0
Hussein M’Barki	32	17	0	0	68
Steve Mills	16	3	0	0	12
Peter Souto	12	1	0	0	4
Trevor Stockley	32	10	0	0	40
Ray Tabern	7	1	0	0	4
Jimmy Ward	4	1	0	0	4
