= 1982–83 Fulham RLFC season =

- 1982–83 RFL season Rank: 1st
- Challenge Cup: Second Round
- 1982–83 record: Wins: 28; draws: 1; losses: 5
- Points scored: For: 699; against: 294

Team information
- Chairman: Ernie Clay
- Player Coach: Reg Bowden
- Captain: Reg Bowden
- Stadium: Craven Cottage
- Avg. attendance: 3222
- High attendance: 10,432 vs. Australia

Top scorers
- Tries: John Crossley - 27
- Goals: Steve Diamond - 136
- Points: Steve Diamond - 308
← 1981–82	List of seasons	1983–84 →

The 1982–83 Fulham RLFC season was the third in the club's history. They competed in the 1982–83 Second Division of the Rugby Football League. They also competed in the 1982–83 Challenge Cup and the 1982–83 League Cup. They gained their first piece of silverware, finishing the season as champions and were promoted to the top tier of professional rugby league in the UK.

== Second Division League Table ==
	Club	P	W	D	L	PF	PA	Pts
1	Fulham	32	27	1	4	699	294	55
2	Wakefield Trinity	32	25	2	5	672	381	52
3	Salford	32	24	0	8	686	363	48
4	Whitehaven	32	20	3	9	464	298	43
5	Bramley	32	20	1	11	560	369	41
6	Hunslet	32	17	5	10	553	448	39
7	Swinton	32	19	1	12	549	454	39
8	Cardiff	32	17	2	13	572	444	36
9	Keighley	32	15	5	12	470	423	35
10	York	32	15	0	17	516	455	30
11	Blackpool Borough	32	13	1	18	381	433	27
12	Huddersfield	32	13	1	18	397	524	27
13	Rochdale Hornets	32	10	5	17	361	469	25
14	Dewsbury	32	8	1	23	325	507	17
15	Batley	32	6	1	25	305	719	13
16	Huyton	32	6	0	26	250	687	12
17	Doncaster	32	2	1	29	307	799	5

Champions	Play-offs	Promoted	Relegated

== Players ==
Name	Appearances	Tries	Goals	Drop Goals	Points
Dave Allen	32	18	0	0	54
Stephen Bayliss	16	13	0	0	39
Harry Beverley	34	1	0	0	3
Reg Bowden	31	9	0	0	27
Adrian Cambriani	15	3	0	0	9
John Crossley	37	27	0	0	81
John Dalgreen	27	7	0	0	21
Steve Diamond	39	12	136	0	308
Joe Doherty	31	5	0	0	15
David Eckersley	29	6	1	4	24
Francis Feighan	1	1	0	0	3
Chris Ganley	11	2	0	0	6
Tony Gourley	38	1	0	0	3
Martin Herdman	27	3	0	0	9
Sean Hoare	21	7	0	0	21
Charlie Jones	5	1	0	0	3
Tony Kinsey	31	6	0	1	19
Roy Lester	13	0	0	0	0
Hussein M’Barki	37	23	0	0	69
Steve Mills	5	7	0	0	21
Carl Radbone	9	1	0	0	3
Peter Souto	30	7	0	0	21
Neil Tuffs	20	3	0	0	9
John Wood	22	4	0	0	12
