= 1981–82 Fulham RLFC season =

- 1981–82 RFL season Rank: 13th
- Challenge Cup: Second Round
- 1981-82 record: Wins: 10; draws: 1; losses: 21
- Points scored: For: 365; against: 539

Team information
- Chairman: Ernie Clay
- Player Coach: Reg Bowden
- Captain: Reg Bowden
- Stadium: Craven Cottage
- Avg. attendance: 4494
- High attendance: 9,481 vs. Hull F.C.

Top scorers
- Tries: John Crossley - 15
- Goals: Steve Diamond - 92
- Points: Steve Diamond - 206
Home colours	Away colours
← 1980-81	List of seasons	1982-83 →

The 1981-82 Fulham RLFC season was the second in the club's history. They competed in the 1981–82 Championship in the Rugby Football League. They also competed in the 1981–82 Challenge Cup and the 1981–82 League Cup. They finished the season in 13th place and were relegated from the top tier of professional rugby league in the UK.

== Championship table ==
Final Standings

	Team	Pld	W	D	L	PF	PA	PD	Pts
1	Leigh	30	24	1	5	572	343	+229	49
2	Hull	30	23	1	6	611	273	+338	47
3	Widnes	30	23	1	6	551	317	+234	47
4	Hull Kingston Rovers	30	22	1	7	554	319	+235	45
5	Bradford Northern	30	17	1	12	425	332	+93	41
6	Leeds	30	17	1	12	514	418	+96	35
7	St Helens	30	17	1	12	465	415	+50	35
8	Warrington	30	14	2	14	403	468	+65	30
9	Barrow	30	13	0	17	408	445	-37	26
10	Featherstone Rovers	30	12	1	17	482	493	-11	25
11	Wigan	30	12	0	18	424	435	-11	24
12	Castleford	30	10	1	19	486	505	-19	21
13	Fulham	30	9	1	20	365	539	-174	19
14	Wakefield Trinity	30	9	1	20	341	526	-185	19
15	York	30	4	2	24	330	773	-443	10
16	Whitehaven	30	2	3	25	224	565	-341	7

== Players ==
Name	Appearances	Tries	Goals	Drop Goals	Points
Dave Allen	25	7	0	0	21
Mal Aspey	15	3	0	0	9
Harry Beverley	24	0	0	0	0
Reg Bowden	28	1	0	0	3
Adrian Cambriani	17	6	0	0	18
Chris Camilleri	6	0	0	0	0
John Crossley	29	15	0	0	45
John Dalgreen	24	2	0	2	8
Steve Diamond	35	7	92	1	206
Joe Doherty	26	5	0	0	15
David Eckersley	22	2	0	2	8
Chris Ganley	20	2	0	0	6
Tony Gourley	26	0	0	0	0
Martin Herdman	32	7	0	1	22
Sean Hoare	23	3	0	0	9
Tony Kinsey	27	1	0	0	3
Roy Lester	9	1	0	0	3
Hussein M’Barki	23	8	0	0	24
Carl Radbone	20	6	1	0	20
Peter Souto	18	0	0	0	0
Harold Stringer	6	1	0	0	3
Neil Tuffs	30	0	0	2	2
Michael Walsh	4	0	0	0	0
John Wood	17	3	0	0	9
