= 1984–85 Fulham RLFC season =

- 1984–85 Rank: 8th
- Challenge Cup: First Round
- 1984–85 record: Wins: 16; draws: 1; losses: 12
- Points scored: For: 521; against: 526

Team information
- Chairman: Barbara Close
- Coach: Reg Bowden; Roy Lester
- Stadium: Polytechnic of Central London; Stadium, Chiswick
- Avg. attendance: 1045
- High attendance: 2324 vs. Hull F.C.

Top scorers
- Tries: Mike Davis - 17; Steve Mills - 17
- Goals: Chris Wilkinson - 63
- Points: Chris Wilkinson - 157
← 1983–84	List of seasons	1985–86 →

The 1984–85 Fulham RLFC season was the fifth in the club's history. They competed in the 1984–85 Second Division of the Rugby Football League. They also competed in the 1984–85 Challenge Cup, 1984–85 Lancashire Cup and the 1984–85 League Cup. They finished the season in 8th place in the second tier of British professional rugby league.

== 1984-85 Second Division table ==
	Team	Pld	W	D	L	PF	PA	PD	Pts
1	Swinton	28	24	1	3	727	343	384	49
2	Salford	28	20	3	5	787	333	454	43
3	York	28	21	1	6	717	430	287	43
4	Dewsbury	28	21	1	6	539	320	219	43
5	Carlisle	28	19	0	9	547	437	110	38
6	Whitehaven	28	16	3	9	496	385	111	35
7	Batley	28	17	0	11	489	402	87	34
8	Fulham	28	16	1	11	521	526	−5	33
9	Mansfield Marksman	28	15	0	13	525	398	127	30
10	Blackpool Gladiators	28	15	0	13	486	434	52	30
11	Wakefield Trinity	28	12	2	14	450	459	−9	26
12	Rochdale Hornets	28	12	2	14	436	466	−30	26
13	Huddersfield Barracudas	28	12	1	15	476	476	0	25
14	Runcorn Highfield	28	11	1	16	462	538	−76	23
15	Keighley	28	11	0	17	495	567	−72	22
16	Bramley	28	9	2	17	439	492	−53	20
17	Sheffield Eagles	28	8	0	20	424	582	-158	16
18	Doncaster	28	6	2	20	353	730	−377	14
19	Southend	28	4	0	24	347	690	−343	8
20	Bridgend Blue Dragons	28	1	0	27	258	966	−708	2

Promoted

== 1984-85 squad ==
Name	Starts	Substitute	Total	Tries	Goals	Drop Goals	Points
Des Armitage	1	1	1	0	0	0	0
Norman Barrow	8	0	8	3	3	0	18
Jeff Brown	2	0	2	0	0	0	0
George Bryan	18	0	18	3	0	0	12
Mike Burke	1	0	1	0	0	0	0
Adrian Cambriani	6	0	6	3	0	0	12
Peter Cass	4	0	4	0	0	0	0
Mike Davis	23	0	23	17	0	0	68
Alan Dearden	13	1	14	0	0	0	0
Joe Doherty	10	0	10	1	0	0	4
David Driver	10	0	10	6	0	0	24
Don Duffy	21	0	21	2	0	0	8
Steve Garner	19	2	21	4	0	0	16
Brett Garside	4	2	6	0	0	0	0
Tony Gourley	17	1	18	0	0	0	0
Ken Green	4	6	10	1	0	0	4
Harold Henney	18	2	20	2	0	0	8
Sean Hoare	16	1	17	4	0	0	16
Steve Hulme	1	0	1	0	0	0	0
Charlie Jones	21	6	3	0	0	0	12
Ivan Kete	9	1	10	0	0	0	0
Andy Key	17	0	17	2	0	0	8
Tony Kinsey	10	1	11	3	0	0	12
Frank Matthews	9	0	9	1	0	0	4
Steve Mills	31	0	31	17	0	0	68
Brian Parkes	5	0	5	0	0	0	0
Carl Radbone	1	0	1	0	0	0	0
Andy Rippon	4	0	4	2	7	0	22
Paul Rochford	13	0	13	4	14	0	44
Kevin Simpson	4	5	9	0	0	0	0
Martin Smith	4	1	5	0	0	0	0
John Stockley	3	0	3	1	0	0	4
Trevor Stockley	8	0	8	4	0	0	16
Takura Tawera	15	0	15	0	0	0	0
Glen Townsend	12	5	17	3	0	0	12
Jimmy Ward	1	0	1	0	0	0	0
Duncan Webster	11	0	11	2	0	0	8
Chris Wilkinson	28	2	30	6	63	7	157
Trialists	1	5	6	0	0	0	0
