= 1985–86 Fulham RLFC season =

- 1985–86 RFL season Rank: 9th
- Challenge Cup: First Round
- 1985–86 record: Wins: 16; draws: 1; losses: 18
- Points scored: For: 679; against: 709

Team information
- Chairman: Paul Faires
- Coach: Roy Lester; Bill Goodwin
- Stadium: Polytechnic of Central London Stadium, Chiswick
- Avg. attendance: 874
- High attendance: 1493 vs. Warrington

Top scorers
- Tries: Steve Mills - 11
- Goals: Chris Wilkinson - 72
- Points: Chris Wilkinson - 187
← 1984–85	List of seasons	1986–87 →

The 1985–86 Fulham RLFC season was the sixth in the club's history. They competed in the 1985–86 Second Division of the Rugby Football League. They also competed in the 1985–86 Challenge Cup, 1985–86 Lancashire Cup and the 1985–86 League Cup. They finished the season in 9th place in the second tier of British professional rugby league.

== 1985-86 Second Division league table ==
=== Second Division table ===
	Club	P	W	D	L	PF	PA	Pts
1	Leigh	34	33	0	1	1156	373	66
2	Barrow	34	27	0	7	1012	398	54
3	Wakefield Trinity	34	24	1	9	680	435	49
4	Whitehaven	34	22	0	12	619	479	44
5	Rochdale Hornets	34	21	0	13	763	485	42
6	Blackpool Borough	34	20	0	14	769	570	40
7	Batley	34	18	3	13	567	450	39
8	Bramley	34	17	1	16	608	663	35
9	Fulham	34	16	1	17	679	709	33
10	Doncaster	34	16	1	17	611	650	33
11	Carlisle	34	15	2	17	585	682	32
12	Sheffield Eagles	34	14	1	19	516	617	29
13	Workington Town	34	13	0	21	684	723	26
14	Hunslet	34	11	3	20	594	795	25
15	Huddersfield Barracudas	34	8	4	22	542	841	20
16	Runcorn Highfield	34	9	2	23	489	790	20
17	Keighley	34	9	2	23	401	918	20
18	Mansfield Marksman	34	2	1	31	383	1080	5

Champions	Play-offs	Promoted	Relegated

== 1985-86 squad ==
Name	Starts	Substitute	Total	Tries	Goals	Drop Goals	Points
Norman Barry	28	3	31	6	7	0	38
Phil Briscoe	11	0	11	1	0	0	4
David Bullough	16	1	17	9	0	0	36
Adrian Cambriani	26	0	26	10	0	0	40
Tony Cooper	2	1	3	0	0	0	0
Mike Davis	21	1	22	8	0	1	33
Alan Dearden	7	0	7	0	0	0	0
David Driver	4	1	5	2	0	0	8
Dan Duffy	31	0	31	7	0	0	28
Frank Feighnan	9	3	12	3	0	0	12
Brian Flashman	1	0	1	1	0	0	4
Steve Garner	14	1	15	3	0	0	12
Russ Gibson	7	1	8	4	0	2	18
Mick Glover	24	0	24	2	0	0	8
John Green	1	0	1	0	0	0	0
Ken Green	9	0	9	0	0	0	0
Gary Henley-Smith	18	0	18	8	0	0	32
Harold Henney	19	0	19	6	0	1	25
Martin Herdman	0	1	1	0	0	0	0
Shaun Hoare	14	1	15	2	0	0	8
Roger Hodson	2	6	8	0	0	0	0
Brian Hunter	6	0	6	2	0	0	8
Nick Johnson	0	1	1	0	0	0	0
Charlie Jones	25	7	32	5	0	0	20
Ivan Kete	0	2	2	0	0	0	0
Andy Key	6	3	9	2	0	0	8
Tony Kinsey	31	1	32	4	0	0	16
Tony Looker	9	0	9	3	0	0	12
Frank Matthews	8	4	12	3	0	0	12
Colin Meachin	0	1	1	0	0	0	0
Wayne Millington	7	0	7	0	0	0	0
Steve Mills	27	0	27	11	0	0	44
Bob Mordell	5	3	8	0	0	0	0
Glen Nissen	18	2	20	4	0	0	16
Tony Noel	1	0	1	0	0	0	0
Tony O'Reilly	1	2	3	2	0	0	8
Alan Platt	28	0	28	5	27	4	78
Billy Platt	2	0	2	0	0	0	0
Ian Rexson	5	2	7	1	0	0	4
Eddie Tinsley	5	3	8	0	0	0	0
Glen Townsend	2	2	4	0	0	0	0
Chris Wilkinson	31	2	33	10	72	3	187
Graham Worgan	0	1	1	0	0	0	0
Mal Yates	0	1	1	0	0	0	0
