= 1988–89 Fulham RLFC season =

- 1988–89 Rank: 15th
- Challenge Cup: First Round
- 1987–88 record: Wins: 10; draws: 0; losses: 19
- Points scored: For: 464; against: 650

Team information
- Chairman: Barbara Close
- Coach: Bev Risman (May 1988 - Feb. 1989); Bill Sullivan (Feb. 1989 - March 1989); Bill Goodwin (March 1989 - April 1989)
- Stadium: Polytechnic of Central London; Stadium, Chiswick
- Avg. attendance: 644
- High attendance: 1487 vs. Bradford Northern

Top scorers
- Tries: Dave Gillan - 14
- Goals: Steve Guyett - 65
- Points: Steve Guyett - 145
← 1987–88	List of seasons	1989–90 →

The 1988–89 Fulham RLFC season was the ninth in the club's history. They competed in the 1988–89 Second Division of the Rugby Football League. They also competed in the 1989 Challenge Cup, 1988–89 Lancashire Cup and the 1988–89 League Cup. They finished the season in 15th place in the second tier of British professional rugby league.

== 1988-89 Second Division table ==
	Team	Pld	W	D	L	PF	PA	PD	Pts
1	Leigh	28	26	0	2	925	338	+587	52
2	Barrow	28	21	1	6	726	326	+400	43
3	Sheffield Eagles	28	19	1	8	669	362	+307	39
4	York	28	17	1	10	585	383	+202	35
5	Swinton	28	16	2	10	621	482	+139	34
6	Doncaster	28	17	0	11	599	464	+135	34
7	Whitehaven	28	15	2	11	522	378	+144	32
8	Keighley	28	16	0	12	551	525	+26	32
9	Rochdale Hornets	28	15	0	13	655	677	-22	30
10	Bramley	28	14	1	13	600	514	+86	29
11	Carlisle	28	14	1	13	512	441	+71	29
12	Batley	28	13	3	12	461	416	+45	29
13	Dewsbury	28	13	0	15	518	626	-108	26
14	Hunslet	28	12	1	15	473	540	-67	25
15	Fulham	28	10	0	18	464	650	-186	20
16	Chorley Borough	28	9	1	18	408	533	-125	19
17	Workington Town	28	9	1	18	365	549	-184	19
18	Huddersfield	28	9	1	18	400	615	-215	19
19	Mansfield Marksman	28	4	1	23	308	769	-461	9
20	Runcorn Highfield	28	2	1	25	224	998	-774	5

Promoted

== 1988-89 squad ==
Name	Starts	Substitute	Total Appearances	Tries	Goals	Drop Goals	Points
David Baker	4	0	4	0	0	0	0
Neil Bibby	7	4	11	0	0	0	8
Bob Boyce	20	3	23	2	0	0	8
Gary Braniff	1	1	2	0	0	0	0
Russ Bridge	24	0	24	3	0	0	12
Brian Brown	6	0	6	1	0	5	9
Steve Callow	3	1	4	0	0	0	0
Paul Cheetham	2	2	4	1	0	0	4
Jeff Coutts	30	1	31	9	11	3	61
Joe Dutton	11	1	12	4	0	0	16
Colin Fenn	7	2	9	0	2	0	4
Hugh Francis	7	4	11	2	0	0	8
Ernie Garland	6	0	6	2	0	0	8
Dave Gillan	27	1	28	14	0	0	56
Nick Grimoldby	8	1	9	0	0	0	0
Steve Guyett	25	2	27	3	65	3	145
Albert Heig	2	2	4	0	0	0	0
Mike Hutchinson	28	2	30	1	0	0	4
Scott Jennings	16	1	17	1	2	0	8
Lawrence Johannson	12	2	14	1	0	0	4
Noel Keating	0	5	5	0	0	0	0
Gary Lane	12	0	12	3	0	1	13
Roy Leslie	5	5	10	0	0	0	0
Kevin Manning	1	0	1	0	0	0	0
Glenn Mansfield	26	0	26	9	0	0	36
Hussein M'Barki	24	0	24	7	0	0	28
Andrew Mighty	23	1	24	6	0	0	24
Keiron Murphy	17	4	21	4	0	0	16
Greg Pearce	2	0	2	1	0	0	4
Huw Rees	13	0	13	3	0	0	12
Andrew Render	2	4	6	0	1	0	2
David Rotherham	1	0	1	0	0	0	0
Craig Taylor	2	0	2	0	0	0	0
Dennis Trembath	1	1	2	0	0	0	0
Paul Walker	15	0	15	1	0	0	4
Ian Wightman	5	0	5	0	0	0	0
Andrew Zillman	7	1	8	2	0	0	8
Trialists (2)	1	1	2	1	0	0	4
