= 1986–87 Fulham RLFC season =

- 1986–87 Rank: 12th
- Challenge Cup: First Round
- 1986–87 record: Wins: 9; draws: 2; losses: 19
- Points scored: For: 461; against: 632

Team information
- Chairman: Barbara Close
- Coach: Bill Goodwin
- Stadium: Polytechnic of Central London; Stadium, Chiswick
- Avg. attendance: 759
- High attendance: 1575 vs. Halifax

Top scorers
- Tries: Steve Mills - 12
- Goals: Colin Fenn - 65
- Points: Colin Fenn - 134
← 1985–86	List of seasons	1987–88 →

The 1986–87 Fulham RLFC season was the seventh in the club's history. They competed in the 1986–87 Second Division of the Rugby Football League. They also competed in the 1987 Challenge Cup, 1986–87 Lancashire Cup and the 1986–87 League Cup. They finished the season in 12th place in the second tier of British professional rugby league.

== 1986-87 Second Division table ==
A complicated fixture formula was introduced in the Second Division and continued until the 1991–92 season.

	Team	Pld	W	D	L	PF	PA	Pts
1	Hunslet	28	25	0	3	722	218	50
2	Swinton	28	23	1	4	713	323	47
3	Whitehaven	28	21	1	6	577	304	43
4	Doncaster	28	20	1	7	586	388	41
5	Rochdale Hornets	28	19	1	8	519	369	39
6	Sheffield Eagles	28	17	0	11	625	426	34
7	Bramley	28	16	0	12	407	440	32
8	Carlisle	28	15	1	12	463	446	31
9	Blackpool Borough	28	14	0	14	530	477	28
10	York	28	11	0	17	492	537	22
11	Runcorn Highfield	28	10	1	17	391	533	21
12	Fulham	28	8	2	18	461	632	18
13	Batley	28	9	0	19	335	528	18
14	Workington Town	28	9	0	19	405	652	18
15	Huddersfield Barracudas	28	8	0	20	456	673	16
16	Mansfield Marksman	28	8	0	20	366	592	16
17	Dewsbury	28	8	0	20	328	563	16
18	Keighley	28	7	0	21	366	641	14

Champions	Play-offs	Promoted	Relegated

== 1986-87 squad ==
Name	Starts	Substitute	Total Appearances	Tries	Goals	Drop Goals	Points
Neil Bibby	1	5	6	1	0	0	4
Mark Birmingham	0	1	1	0	0	0	0
Karl Bowen	5	1	6	0	0	0	0
Russ Bridge	28	2	30	5	0	0	20
Adrian Cambriani	14	1	15	1	0	0	4
Andy Collier	1	0	1	0	0	0	0
Dominic Cooper	12	1	13	0	0	1	1
Martin Dean	1	0	1	0	0	0	0
Frank Feighan	17	2	19	2	0	0	8
Colin Fenn	22	2	24	1	65	0	134
John Fisoh	1	1	2	1	0	0	4
Brian Flashman	4	0	4	1	0	0	4
Russ Gibson	6	5	11	1	6	0	16
Dave Gillan	20	1	21	7	0	0	28
Steve Goyer	6	0	6	1	0	0	4
Gavin Green	1	0	1	0	0	0	0
Mick Grimaldi	8	2	10	0	0	0	0
Glen Haggath	18	0	18	3	2	0	16
Martin Herdman	3	0	3	0	0	0	0
Mick Hutchinson	4	1	5	0	0	0	0
Charlie Jones	27	1	28	6	0	0	24
Bob Knight	24	0	24	1	0	0	4
Geordie Lawrie	10	2	12	1	0	0	4
John Mayo	6	0	6	0	0	0	0
Craig Miller	6	0	6	3	0	0	12
Wayne Millington	2	0	2	1	0	0	4
Steve Mills	28	1	29	12	3	0	54
Simon Mitchell	3	2	5	0	0	0	0
Keiron Murphy	23	0	23	8	0	3	35
Gary O'Brien	3	0	3	2	0	0	8
Pat O'Doherty	18	1	19	7	0	0	28
Greg Pratt	16	0	16	1	0	0	4
Darren Rampling	2	6	8	0	0	0	0
Huw Rees	25	0	25	8	7	2	48
Brian Rendall	11	5	16	2	0	0	8
Gary Scott	1	1	2	0	0	0	0
Craig Taylor	17	0	17	1	0	0	4
Peter White	22	1	23	7	0	0	28
Wilkinson	10	0	10	1	6	3	19
Trialists	3	3	6	0	0	0	0
