= 1987–88 Fulham RLFC season =

Fulham RLFC season

- 1987–88 RFL season Rank: 17th
- Challenge Cup: First Round
- 1987–88 record: Wins: 10; draws: 0; losses: 19
- Points scored: For: 382; against: 559

Team information
- Chairman: Barbara Close
- Coach: Bill Goodwin
- Stadium: Polytechnic of Central London Stadium, Chiswick
- Avg. attendance: 659
- High attendance: 1216 vs. PNG

Top scorers
- Tries: Dave Gillian - 9
- Goals: Colin Fenn - 40
- Points: Colin Fenn - 80
← 1986–87	List of seasons	1988–89 →

The 1987–88 Fulham RLFC season was the eighth in the club's history. They competed in the 1987–88 Second Division of the Rugby Football League. They also competed in the 1987–88 Challenge Cup, 1987–88 Lancashire Cup and the 1987–88 League Cup. They finished the season in 17th place in the second tier of British professional rugby league.

== 1987-88 Second Division league table ==
=== Second Division ===
	Team	Pld	W	D	L	PF	PA	Pts
1	Oldham	28	23	1	4	771	335	47
2	Featherstone Rovers	28	21	2	5	712	353	44
3	Wakefield Trinity	28	20	1	7	666	315	41
4	Springfield Borough	28	18	0	10	448	356	36
5	Sheffield Eagles	28	16	1	11	490	429	33
6	York	28	15	1	12	558	526	31
7	Mansfield Marksman	28	15	1	12	439	412	31
8	Keighley	28	15	0	13	497	428	30
9	Barrow	28	14	2	12	382	397	30
10	Workington Town	28	15	0	13	380	441	30
11	Carlisle	28	14	1	13	388	444	29
12	Runcorn Highfield	28	14	0	14	420	469	28
13	Whitehaven	28	10	1	17	417	452	21
14	Bramley	28	10	1	17	400	600	21
15	Dewsbury	28	10	0	18	417	519	20
16	Doncaster	28	9	2	17	406	512	20
17	Fulham	28	10	0	18	382	559	20
18	Rochdale Hornets	28	10	0	18	322	514	20
19	Huddersfield Barracudas	28	7	1	20	383	597	15
20	Batley	28	6	1	21	305	523	13

== 1987-88 squad ==
Name	Appearances	Substitute	Total Appearances	Tries	Goals	Drop Goals	Points
David Aitken	19	1	20	5	0	0	20
Adrian Alexander	3	0	3	0	0	0	0
Tony Bader	1	0	1	0	0	0	0
Neil Bibby	12	4	16	2	0	0	8
Russ Bridge	28	3	31	3	0	0	12
Adrian Cambriani	9	0	9	4	0	0	16
Ian Chatterton	16	2	18	1	0	0	4
Paul Cheetham	17	2	19	5	0	0	20
Dominic Cooper	0	4	4	0	0	0	0
Nick Elgar	6	0	6	1	0	0	4
Frank Feighan	11	1	12	3	0	0	12
Colin Fenn	21	4	25	0	40	0	80
Jamie Fletcher	0	1	1	0	0	0	0
Huw Francis	1	0	1	0	0	0	0
Dave Gillan	29	0	29	9	0	0	36
Nick Grimoldby	29	2	31	3	3	3	21
Steve Guyett	22	2	24	4	19	0	54
Chris Hanson	0	1	1	0	0	0	0
Justin Herbert	0	1	1	0	0	0	0
Mike Hutchinson	29	1	30	2	0	0	8
Lawrence Johannson	3	6	9	0	0	0	0
Charlie Jones	3	0	3	0	0	0	0
Noel Keating	0	1	1	0	0	0	0
Shane Kelly	13	5	18	3	0	0	12
Geordie Lawrie	8	3	11	1	0	0	4
Roy Leslie	1	1	2	0	0	0	0
Kevin Manning	19	5	24	2	0	0	8
Santi Masa	9	0	9	2	0	1	9
Gerry McMullen	0	1	1	0	0	0	0
Andrew Mighty	2	0	2	1	0	0	4
Craig Miller	23	1	24	1	0	0	4
Keiron Murphy	31	0	31	5	0	0	20
Ricky Oliver	0	1	1	0	0	0	0
Paul O'Riley	15	1	16	3	0	0	12
Huw Rees	10	1	11	3	5	0	22
Craig Taylor	22	0	22	2	0	0	8
Ian Wightman	3	3	6	1	0	0	4
