= 1989–90 Fulham RLFC season =

- 1989–90 Rank: 8th
- Challenge Cup: Second Round
- 1989–90 record: Wins: 18; draws: 2; losses: 11
- Points scored: For: 496; against: 488

Team information
- Chairman: David Price
- Coach: Ross Strudwick
- Stadium: Polytechnic of Central London; Stadium, Chiswick
- Avg. attendance: 1073
- High attendance: 3204 vs. Wigan

Top scorers
- Tries: Brett Daunt & Mick Taylor - 12
- Goals: Greg Pearce - 47
- Points: Greg Pearce - 102
← 1988–89	List of seasons	1990–91 →

The 1989–90 Fulham RLFC season was the tenth in the club's history. They competed in the 1989–90 Second Division of the Rugby Football League. They also competed in the 1990 Challenge Cup, 1989–90 Lancashire Cup and the 1989–90 League Cup. They finished the season in 8th place in the second tier of British professional rugby league.

== 1989-90 Second Division Final Standings ==
	Team	Pld	W	D	L	PF	PA	PD	Pts
1	Hull Kingston Rovers	28	25	0	3	1102	190	912	50
2	Rochdale Hornets	28	24	0	4	977	422	555	48
3	Oldham	28	24	0	4	879	325	554	48
4	Ryedale-York	28	20	1	7	653	338	315	41
5	Halifax	28	20	0	8	741	360	381	40
6	Swinton	28	20	0	8	673	405	268	40
7	Dewsbury	28	19	1	8	503	411	92	39
8	Fulham	28	16	2	10	496	488	8	34
9	Doncaster	28	15	2	11	533	399	134	32
10	Trafford Borough	28	15	0	13	551	551	0	30
11	Huddersfield	28	14	0	14	469	441	28	28
12	Batley	28	13	0	15	466	478	-12	26
13	Bramley	28	11	0	17	413	623	-210	22
14	Hunslet	28	10	0	18	431	585	-154	20
15	Chorley Borough	28	10	0	18	399	618	-219	20
16	Whitehaven	28	10	0	18	396	710	-314	20
17	Carlisle	28	9	0	19	511	625	-114	18
18	Workington Town	28	6	0	22	311	708	-397	12
19	Keighley	28	6	0	22	436	837	-401	12
20	Nottingham City	28	4	0	24	323	1032	-709	8
21	Runcorn Highfield	28	0	0	28	218	935	-717	0

Promoted

== 1989-90 squad ==
Name	Appearances	Tries	Goals	Drop Goals	Points
Tony Best	1	0	0	0	0
Russ Bridge	29	1	0	0	4
Russell Browning	24	4	0	0	16
Peter Bush	4	1	0	0	4
Steve Callow	2	0	0	0	0
Jeff Coutts	15	8	10	0	52
Brett Daunt	26	12	0	3	51
Dave Gillan	23	8	0	0	32
Steve Guyett	24	5	33	0	86
Lawrence Johannson	8	1	0	0	4
Noel Keating	23	2	0	0	8
Eric Kennedy	21	6	0	0	24
Roy Leslie	18	4	0	0	16
Tim Look	25	3	0	0	12
Hussein M'Barki	22	11	0	0	44
Redvers McCabe	18	8	0	0	32
Ian Mellors	28	11	0	0	4
Keiron Murphy	30	4	0	0	16
Mick Noble	9	1	0	0	4
Greg Pearce	22	2	47	0	102
Darryl Pitt	5	1	0	0	4
Huw Rees	9	1	0	0	4
Steve Roberts	8	1	0	0	4
Karl Robertson	6	1	0	0	4
Dave Rotherham	1	0	0	0	0
Wayne Sanchez	21	3	9	0	30
Conrad Scott	13	0	0	0	0
Mick Taylor	31	12	0	0	48
Ian Wightman	2	0	0	0	0
Brett Williams	27	1	0	0	4
Rob Wright	6	0	0	0	0
Andrew Zillman	30	0	0	0	0
