= Nesiasi Mataitonga =

Tonga international rugby league footballer

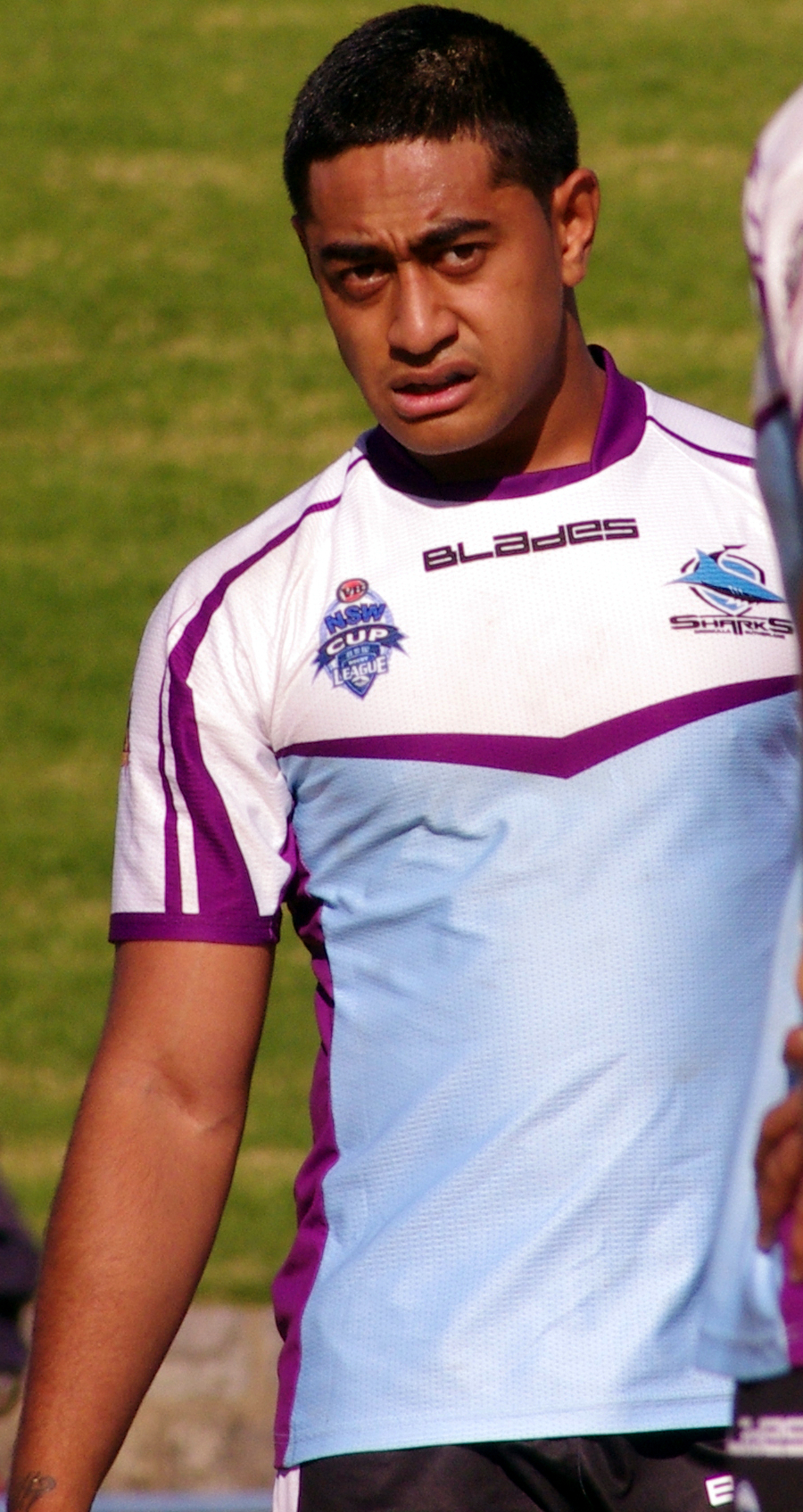

Personal information
- Full name: Nesiasi Pa Mataitonga
- Born: 25 February 1993 (age 33) Auckland, New Zealand
- Height: 189 cm (6 ft 2 in)
- Weight: 94 kg (14 st 11 lb)

Playing information
- Position: Wing, Centre, Fullback
Club
Years	Team	Pld	T	G	FG	P
2014	London Broncos	12	1	0	0	4
2017–18	Racing Club Albi	18	4	0	0	16
	Total	30	5	0	0	20
Representative
Years	Team	Pld	T	G	FG	P
2013	Tonga	1	0	0	0	0
- Source: As of 19 February 2018

Nesiasi Pa Mataitonga (born 25 February 1993 in Auckland, New Zealand), also known by the nickname of '"Nesi"', is a Tonga international rugby league footballer who plays as a fullback and wing. He last played for RC Albi XIII in the Elite One Championship.

He last played for the London Broncos. He represented Tonga in the 2013 World Cup. He played for the Cronulla-Sutherland Sharks Under 20s side in 2012–2013.

In 2014, Mataitonga signed for the London Broncos after being spotted by the capital club after an impressive performance in the world cup.

In 2015, Mataitonga joined the Newtown Jets in the NSW Cup.

He is also a nephew of professional boxer Solomon Haumono.
