= Ernie Garland =

Australian rugby league footballer

Personal information
- Full name: Ernest Garland
- Born: 12 January 1963 (age 63)

Playing information
- Position: Hooker
Club
Years	Team	Pld	T	G	FG	P
1983–85	Eastern Suburbs	23	1	0	0	4
1987	Parramatta Eels	5	0	0	0	0
1988	Western Suburbs	4	0	0	0	0
1988–89	Fulham RLFC	6	2	0	0	8
	Total	38	3	0	0	12

Ernie Garland is an Australian former professional rugby league footballer who played in the 1980s. He played for Eastern Suburbs, Western Suburbs and Parramatta in the NSWRL competition. Garland also played for Fulham RLFC in England.

== Playing career ==
Garland began his career with Eastern Suburbs and made his first grade debut in round 2 of the 1983 season against Cronulla-Sutherland. After three seasons with Easts, Garland signed for defending premiers Parramatta in 1987. He would go on to make five appearances for the club throughout the 1987 season. In 1988, Garland joined the struggling Western Suburbs where he made four appearances in a season where they finished with the Wooden Spoon. At the end of 1988, Garland joined English second division side Fulham RLFC making six appearances.
