= Glen Nissen =

Australian rugby league footballer (born 1966)

Personal information
- Full name: Glen Nissen
- Born: 4 March 1966 (age 60) Sydney, New South Wales, Australia

Playing information
- Position: Fullback, Centre, Wing
Club
Years	Team	Pld	T	G	FG	P
1985–86	Fulham RLFC	20	4	0	0	16
1986–87	Penrith	11	1	0	0	4
1988–91	Canterbury-Bankstown	68	16	0	0	64
1992	Penrith	12	2	0	0	8
	Total	111	23	0	0	92

Glen Nissen (born 4 March 1966), nicknamed "Know-How", is an Australian former professional rugby league footballer who primarily played as a fullback, centre or a winger.

Nissen played for at a club level for Penrith and the Canterbury Bankstown Bulldogs, plus Fulham RLFC in England.
