= Don Duffy =

Australian rugby league footballer

Personal information
- Full name: Donald Duffy
- Born: 7 October 1962 (age 64) Sydney, New South Wales, Australia

Playing information
- Position: Lock, Second-row
Club
Years	Team	Pld	T	G	FG	P
1983–84	Parramatta Eels	18	0	0	0	0
1984–86	Fulham RLFC	30	9	0	0	36
1986–88	Carlisle RLFC	37	2	0	1	9
1990–92	Warrington	25	0	0	0	0
	Total	110	11	0	1	45

Don Duffy is an Australian rugby league footballer who played in the 1980s and 1990s. He played for the Parramatta Eels in the New South Wales Rugby League (NSWRL) competition. Duffy also played for Fulham RLFC now known as the London Broncos, Carlisle RLFC and Warrington.

== Playing career ==
Duffy made his first-grade debut for Parramatta against the Canberra Raiders in Round 2 1983 at Belmore Oval. Parramatta would go on to reach the 1983 NSWRL grand final in a rematch against Manly from the previous season. Duffy was selected by coach Jack Gibson to play from the bench. Parramatta went on to win the match 18-6 and claim their third straight premiership. As of the 2019 NRL season, no other club has won 3 premierships in a row since.

Duffy played one final season for Parramatta in 1984 before departing to England. From 1984 to 1986, Duffy played for Fulham RLFC which would later go on to be renamed the London Broncos. After 3 seasons with Fulham, Duffy played lower leagues for Carlisle. In 1990, Duffy joined Rugby Football League Championship First Division side Warrington. Duffy played with Warrington until the end of 1992 before retiring.
