= Glenn Mansfield =

Australian rugby league footballer

Personal information
- Full name: Glenn Mansfield
- Born: 17 May 1962 (age 64) Sydney, New South Wales, Australia

Playing information
- Position: Second-row
Club
Years	Team	Pld	T	G	FG	P
1982–88	Parramatta Eels	39	3	0	0	12
1988–89	Fulham RLFC	26	9	0	0	36
	Total	65	12	0	0	48

Glenn Mansfield is an Australian rugby league footballer who played in the 1980s. He played for the Parramatta Eels in the New South Wales Rugby League (NSWRL) competition and Fulham RLFC in England.

== Playing career ==
Mansfield made his debut for Parramatta against the Canberra Raiders in Round 21 1982 coming off the bench in a 37–5 win at Seiffert Oval. Mansfield missed out on selection in the clubs victorious grand final team which defeated Manly. In 1983, Mansfield made only 3 appearances and was not included in the 1983 grand final winning team.

In 1984, Mansfield played 13 times as Parramatta reached their fourth straight grand final against arch rivals Canterbury-Bankstown. Mansfield played from the bench as Parramatta lost the match 6–4. Despite only getting limited game time, Mansfield remained loyal to Parramatta and played for the club throughout the 1980s mainly playing from the bench. Mansfield missed out selection in the 1986 grand final victory over Canterbury. Mansfield retired at the conclusion of the 1988 season. His last match in the top grade was against North Sydney in Round 21 1988 at North Sydney Oval.
