= Malcolm Yates =

English rugby league footballer

Personal information
- Born: c. 1957 Leigh, Lancashire, England
- Died: 15 February 1997 (aged 39)

Playing information
- Position: Prop
Club
Years	Team	Pld	T	G	FG	P
1977–80	Leigh	65	3	8	1	26
1980–83	Salford	90	28	24	0	132
1983–84	Warrington	23	1	0	0	4
	Total	178	32	32	1	162
Representative
Years	Team	Pld	T	G	FG	P
1981	Lancashire	1	0	0	0	0

Malcolm Yates (c. 1957 – 15 February 1997) was an English rugby league footballer who played as a prop. Yates began his career at his home town club Leigh and went on to play for Salford and Warrington. He also won representative honours with Lancashire.

== Background ==
Yates was born in Leigh, Lancashire, England.

== Career ==
Yates started his rugby league career with Leigh. In November 1980, he was signed by Salford for a fee of £10,000. In September 1983, he was signed by Warrington for a fee of £10,000.
