= Shane Kelly (rugby league) =

Australian rugby league footballer

Personal information
- Full name: Shane Kelly
- Born: 11 January 1977 (age 48)

Playing information
- Position: Centre
Club
Years	Team	Pld	T	G	FG	P
2000–01	Canberra Raiders	11	3	0	0	12

Shane Kelly (born 11 January 1977) is an Australian former professional rugby league footballer who played for the Canberra Raiders in the National Rugby League.

== Playing career ==
Kelly played two seasons of first-grade at Canberra. He played the final two rounds of the 2000 home and away season, off the bench, then in 2001 was the starting centre in the first nine rounds of the season.

His younger brother Brad also played in the NRL for Canberra.
