= Steve Bayliss =

Wales international rugby league footballer

Personal information
- Full name: Steven Bayliss
- Born: 7 July 1960 (age 66) Ystradgynlais, Wales

Playing information

Rugby union
- Position: Wing, Centre
Club
Years	Team	Pld	T	G	FG	P
≤1980–≤80	Ystradgynlais RFC

Rugby league
- Position: Wing, Centre
Club
Years	Team	Pld	T	G	FG	P
1980–82	St Helens	42	16	0	0	48
1982–84	Fulham	41	21	0	0	71
1986	Lézignan Sangliers
1986–87	St Helens	10	0	0	0	0
	Total	93	37	0	0	119
Representative
Years	Team	Pld	T	G	FG	P
1981	Wales	1

Steven Bayliss (born 7 July 1960) is a Welsh former rugby union, and professional rugby league footballer who played in the 1970s and 1980s. He played club level rugby union (RU) for Ystradgynlais RFC, as a wing, or centre, and representative level rugby league (RL) for Wales, and at club level for St Helens (two spells), Fulham and Lézignan Sangliers, as a centre or wing.

== International honours ==
Bayliss won a cap for Wales (RL) while at St. Helens in 1981.
