= Tony Gourley =

English rugby league footballer

Personal information
- Born: c. 1950 Rochdale, England

Playing information
- Position: Prop
Club
Years	Team	Pld	T	G	FG	P
	Rochdale Hornets
1979–80	Salford
1980–85	Fulham	130	2	0	0	6
	Total	130	2	0	0	6
Representative
Years	Team	Pld	T	G	FG	P
1977–79	Lancashire	2	0	0	0	0

Tony Gourley (born c. 1950) is an English former professional rugby league footballer who played in the 1970s and 1980s. He played at representative level for Lancashire, and at club level for Rochdale Hornets, Salford and Fulham, as a prop.

== Background ==
Gourley was born in Rochdale, Lancashire, England.

== Career ==
Gourley started his career with Rochdale Hornets. In 1979, he was signed by Salford for a fee of £10,000. A year later he joined the newly formed Fulham, and was a key member of their inaugural squad. He spent five seasons at the club before being forced to retire after suffering an eye injury in a match against Bridgend Blue Dragons in March 1985.

Gourley also played two games for Lancashire.
