= Martin Herdman =

English actor, boxer, and Wales international rugby league footballer

Personal information
- Full name: Martin John Herdman
- Born: 24 July 1956 (age 70) Chertsey, Middlesex, England

Playing information
- Height: 6 ft 2 in (1.88 m)
- Weight: 17 st 7 lb (111 kg)
- Position: Second-row
Club
Years	Team	Pld	T	G	FG	P
1980–84	Fulham RLFC	92	14	0	2	90
1984(loan)	→ Leigh
	Total	92	14	0	2	90
Representative
Years	Team	Pld	T	G	FG	P
1981–82	Wales	3	0	0	0	0

Martin Herdman (born 24 July 1956) is an English actor, boxer and former professional rugby league footballer.

== Sporting career ==
Herdman was a boxer for several years, and won the South West London ABA Heavyweight Championship in 1978. He also represented England in international matches against Kenya and Hungary.

Herdman also played rugby league as a second-row, playing at representative level for Wales, and club level for Fulham RLFC. He won three caps for Wales while at Fulham from 1981 to 1982.

In 1984, Herdman went to America after being given a tryout as a running back for the Kansas City Chiefs of the National Football League, but was cut from their roster.

== Acting career ==
Herdman has played regular parts in Bramwell, Coronation Street, Family Affairs, Soldier Soldier, Drop the Dead Donkey, Silent Witness, Wycliffe, The Bill and Midsomer Murders. He played the lead role in the 2018 feature film Sink, written and directed by Mark Gillis.

== Personal life ==
Herdman is the father of four sons, the youngest of whom is actor Joshua Herdman of the Harry Potter films. He ran the Herdman Family Carpet Shop in St Margarets from 1999–2020. The business went into insolvency in 2022.
