= Hussein M'Barki =

Morocco international rugby footballer

Personal information
- Born: 29 December 1955 (age 70) Fez, Morocco

Playing information
- Height: 5 ft 9 in (1.75 m)
- Weight: 12 st 4 lb (78 kg)

Rugby union
- Position: Fullback
Club
Years	Team	Pld	T	G	FG	P
	Narbonne
	Cahors
	Total	0	0	0	0	0
Representative
Years	Team	Pld	T	G	FG	P
	Morocco

Rugby league
- Position: Fullback, Wing, Centre
Club
Years	Team	Pld	T	G	FG	P
1981–84	Fulham	92	48	0	0	161
1984–85	Warrington	5+3	2	0	0	8
1985–87	Oldham	60	12	0	0	48
1987–88	Hull FC	13+1	1	0	0	4
1988–92	Fulham	57+14	26	0	0	104
	Total	245	89	0	0	325

Hussein M'Barki (born 29 December 1955) is a Moroccan former rugby union and rugby league footballer who played in the 1970s, 1980s and 1990s. He played primarily as a fullback, but featured as a fullback, wing or centre during his rugby league career.

M'Barki started his career in rugby union, and began representing Morocco in 1975 at the age of 19. He later moved to France, where he played for Narbonne and Cahors.

In September 1981, he appeared twice as a trialist for rugby league club Fulham. He completed his move to Fulham in November 1981 after securing a work permit.

M'Barki left the club in 1984, and went on to play for Warrington, Oldham and Hull FC before returning to Fulham in 1988, remaining with the club until his retirement in 1992. During his two spells with Fulham, he made a combined total of 163 appearances, scoring 74 tries. After ending his playing career, he worked as a development officer, helping to promote rugby league in his home country.

In 2014, M'Barki was inducted into London Broncos' Hall of Fame.

== County Cup final appearances ==
Hussein M'Barki played fullback in Oldham's 6–27 defeat by Wigan in the 1986 Lancashire Cup Final during the 1986–87 season at Knowsley Road, St. Helens on Sunday 19 October 1986.
