= Roy Lester (rugby league) =

English rugby league footballer and coach

Personal information
- Full name: Roy Lester
- Born: Warrington, Lancashire, England

Playing information
- Position: Prop
Club
Years	Team	Pld	T	G	FG	P
1966–76	Leigh	83	12	0	0	36
1976–80	Warrington	94	7	0	0	21
1980–84	Fulham RLFC	47	4	0	0	12
	Total	224	23	0	0	69
Representative
Years	Team	Pld	T	G	FG	P
1971–72	Lancashire

Coaching information
Club
Years	Team	Gms	W	D	L	W%
1984–85	Fulham RLFC	6	0	0	6	0
1986–88	Carlisle	14	5	7	2	36
	Total	20	5	7	8	25

Roy Lester is an English former professional rugby league footballer and coach. He played as a prop for Leigh, Warrington and Fulham RLFC, and Lancashire at representative level. He later coached Fulham and Carlisle, and was also assistant coach at Warrington before the advent of Super League.

== Playing career ==
Lester was an unused sub in the 1971 Challenge Cup Final where Leigh beat Leeds 24–7 at Wembley Stadium in front of a crowd of 85,514.

Lester was newly founded Fulham's first signing, when he signed on a free transfer from Warrington in 1980.

== Post-playing career ==
In 2019 he was inducted into the London Broncos Hall of Fame.
