= London Broncos =

English professional rugby league club

Club information
- Full name: London Broncos Rugby League Football Club
- Nickname(s): The Broncos; London
- Short name: London Broncos
- Colours: Navy and Red
- Founded: 1980; 46 years ago (as Fulham RLFC)
- Website: londonbroncosrl.com

Current details
- Ground: Plough Lane, Wimbledon, London (9,215)
- Chairman: Grant Wechsel
- Coach: Jason Demetriou
- Captain: Reagan Campbell-Gillard
- Competition: tbc
- 2026 season: 1st (Champions)

Uniforms
Home colours	Away colours

Records
- RFL Championship: 3 (1982/83, 2023, 2026)
- League Leaders' Shield: 1 (2026)
- 1895 Cup: 1 (2026)
- Most capped: 208 – Will Lovell
- Highest try scorer: 109 – Luke Dorn
- Highest points scorer: 774 – Paul Sykes

The London Broncos are a professional rugby league club based in Wimbledon, in south London, England. The Broncos are rumoured to be competing in the Super League in 2027 and play their home games at Plough Lane.

Whilst the club has never won a major trophy, they have finished second in the League Championship once and have been Challenge Cup runners-up once. They have had significant successes, such as winning the Championship Grand Final. When they achieved this, they gained promotion to the Super League, on two occasions.

Originally formed as Fulham Rugby League Club in 1980, they have also previously been known as London Crusaders and as Harlequins Rugby League. London's traditional home colours are black, red and white although their current home kit is all dark blue, with an all white away kit.

== History ==
=== Origins ===
Professional rugby league was briefly represented in London during the 1930s by London Highfield (1933), Acton and Willesden (1935–36) and Streatham and Mitcham (1935–36). All these were speculative clubs set up by local businessmen specifically as money making exercises, and were ultimately driven out of business through poor finances. Thereafter, the sport of rugby league in England remained exclusively a northern based game for over forty years until the formation in 1980 of a new club in London, Fulham.

=== 1980–1991: Fulham R.L.F.C. ===
In June 1980, Fulham Football Club chairman Ernie Clay set up a professional rugby league team at Craven Cottage, with the primary intention of creating another income stream for the football club. Warrington director Harold Genders, who had helped to persuade Clay of the potential benefits of establishing a rugby league club in the capital, resigned from the Warrington board to become managing director of Fulham R.L.F.C. The Rugby Football League (RFL), keen to encourage the expansion of the sport beyond its traditional northern heartland, accepted the new club at once. One of the game's leading players, Reg Bowden, was recruited by Genders to act as player-coach and the club's first signing was Roy Lester, on a free transfer from Warrington. Within nine weeks, Genders and Bowden had assembled a team of very experienced players, most of whom were approaching retirement, together with a few promising youngsters.

The club's first match, on 14 September 1980, was a major success; nearly 10,000 Londoners attended the game at Craven Cottage to see the newly formed side convincingly beat highly regarded Wigan 24–5. On 15 February 1981, more than 15,000 were present to see Fulham take on Wakefield Trinity in the Challenge Cup, a club attendance record that still stands. The new Fulham RL team quickly proved to be very competitive and went on to win promotion at the end of their inaugural season. After that initial success, however, immediate relegation from the first division in 1981–82 was something of a reality check.

Fulham played two "home" games against Swinton and Huddersfield at Widnes in 1983 as the pitch at the Cottage had disintegrated in the wet winter following the collapse of the main drain to the River Thames under the Miller Stand.

The club also played several one-off games in 1983 at various football grounds around London; matches were played at Wealdstone's Lower Mead stadium, Hendon's Claremont Road ground, Brentford's Griffin Park and Chelsea's Stamford Bridge.

Despite winning the Division Two Championship comfortably in 1982–83, a second immediate relegation in 1983–84, coupled with continuing financial losses, saw Clay, under pressure from the Fulham football club board, pull the plug at the end of their fourth season. However, with the backing of supporters Roy and Barbara Close and the appointment of a new coach, former player Roy Lester, Fulham RL still had a future. Most of the existing players moved on as free agents, and a new squad began life based at the Crystal Palace National Sports Centre for the 1984–85 season.

After a single season, the club then moved to a new home at Chiswick Polytechnic Sports Ground in the summer of 1985, and would remain there for five years. Bill Goodwin replaced Lester as coach from 1986 to 1987. In August 1986, Fulham hit a serious cash crisis and were forced to withdraw temporarily from the RFL only 11 days before the start of the season, but were able to re-launch in September. Bev Risman was appointed coach at Fulham in 1987. The team was in the bottom half of the second division and continually struggled for success, and Risman left after a couple of seasons and Bill Goodwin returned. Phil Sullivan was coach for just two months between January and February 1989, thereafter Goodwin came in for his third spell and held the reins until May 1989 when Ross Strudwick was appointed.

The club returned to the Crystal Palace National Sports Centre in 1990, this time making it their home for three seasons.

In May 1991, York and Fulham toured Russia.

=== 1991–1994: London Crusaders ===
Prior to the start of the 1991–92 season the club's name was officially changed from Fulham RLFC to London Crusaders RLFC. A slightly more successful period on the pitch begun at this point. Ross Strudwick was replaced as coach by Darryl van der Velde in 1992 but continued as club manager until 1993.

In June 1993 the club moved once again, from Crystal Palace National Sports Centre to Barnet Copthall arena. In November 1993, London Crusaders imposed a 20% pay cut on all staff to ease financial problems. With the club in financial straights, the RFL briefly took ownership of the Crusaders in 1993–94 to protect their southern outpost, but the club were then acquired by new owners Britannic Shipping; Strudwick stepped down as manager to give the club's new owners a clean slate.

Despite the club's financial problems, the team proved very competitive on the pitch under coach Tony Gordon and narrowly missed out on automatic promotion back to the First Division by a single point. The climax of the Crusaders' era was a May 1994 appearance in the Divisional Premiership Final at Old Trafford; although they lost 22–30 to Workington Town, the club had gone into the game with the knowledge that an exciting take-over bid had just been announced.

=== 1994–2005: London Broncos ===
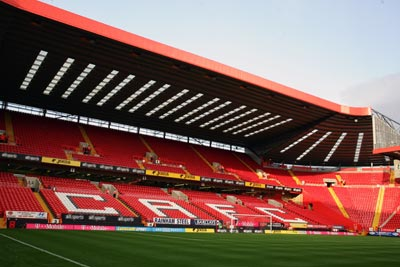
The Valley

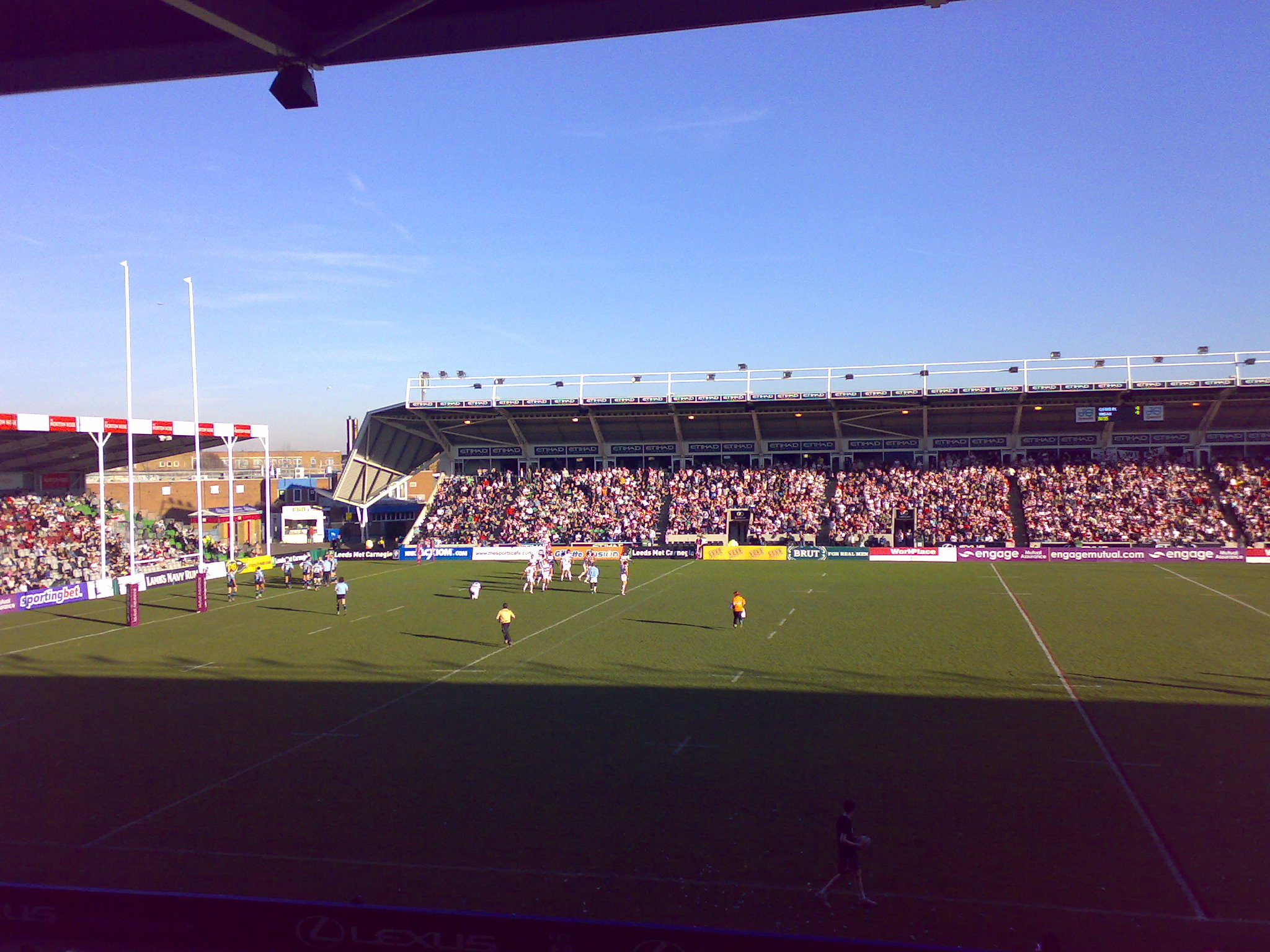
The Stoop

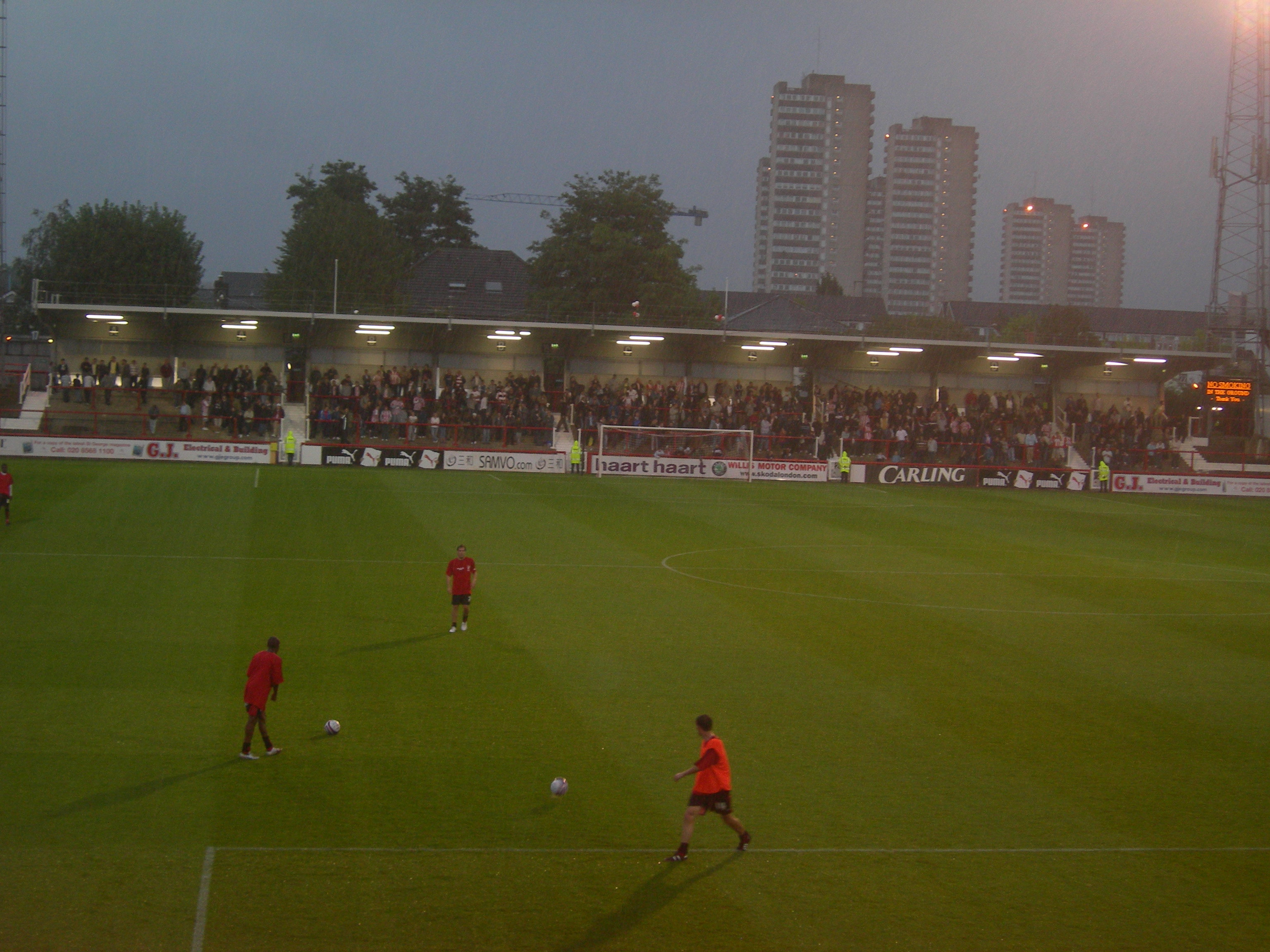
Griffin Park

In the spring of 1994, just prior to the Divisional Premiership Final, it was announced that the successful Australian club Brisbane Broncos was buying the London Crusaders, which would be renamed London Broncos from the start of the forthcoming 1994–95 season. Gordon was replaced by a Brisbane coach, Gary Grienke. The first home game under the new Broncos name was against Keighley at Hendon F.C.'s ground at Claremont Road, though most home games were still played at Barnet Copthall.

For the 1995–96 season the club found another new home base, returning to south-west London at The Stoop Memorial Ground, home of Harlequins Rugby Union Club. Despite finishing fourth in the Second Division the previous season, London Broncos were selected by the RFL to be part of the radical new Super League competition scheduled to begin in the summer of 1996, on the basis that the RFL felt it was commercially essential for the sport's national profile to have a team based in the nation's capital. The regular 1995–96 season, deliberately made brief to accommodate for Super League, ran from August 1995 to January 1996 and saw London included together with the top ten teams from the 1994–95 First Division in a 'Centenary League Championship', effectively a "dry run" for Super League. Faced with much stronger opposition, London struggled and finished second from last.

The club moved once more prior to the start of the 1996 inaugural summer season of Super League, this time to south-east London to play at The Valley, home of Charlton Athletic, when eventual owner David Hughes initially became involved with the club. Former Brisbane Broncos coach Tony Currie was appointed to the role of head coach. The team performed far beyond initial expectations and eventually finished a highly creditable fourth, with Greg Barwick the top points scorer for the club. That season also brought the best London home attendances since the first season at Craven Cottage. Tony Rea retired from playing to take up the Chief Executive role at the club.

The club played at the Stoop Memorial Ground during the 1997 season. The second season of Super League saw an improvement in the team's performance, finishing second to the Bradford Bulls. This represents London's best final league position to date. Richard Branson's Virgin Group became the majority shareholders and primary sponsors of the club. Highlights that year included victories at the Stoop over Canberra in the World Club Challenge and comprehensive league victories against Bradford and Wigan.

In 1998, as part of rugby league's "on the road" scheme, London Broncos played Bradford Bulls at Tynecastle in Edinburgh in front of over 7,000 fans. Success continued in 1998 with a first appearance in the Challenge Cup semi-finals, losing to Wigan. Head coach Tony Currie left the club at the end of the 1998 Super League season and was replaced by Dan Stains.

In 1999, the club went one stage better in the Challenge Cup. Following a famous last-minute semi-final victory over Castleford, the Broncos reached the Challenge Cup Final at Wembley Stadium for the first time, but despite taking a shock early lead in the game and performing bravely, they were soundly defeated 52–16 by red-hot favourites Leeds.

The club returned to The Valley for the 2000 season, but sacked Stains after enduring a long losing streak. Tony Rea was appointed temporary joint head coach with Stains' assistant Les Kiss. Rea and Kiss managed to steer Broncos out of the slump. In 2000, the experienced John Monie was appointed Head Coach. Monie only stayed in the job until the last month of the 2000 Super League season with the club having had mediocre results during his tenure. Rea took over as caretaker coach until the end of the season and Broncos eventually reached mid-table security. Rea then resigned his Chief Executive role at the end of the 2000 season to become Head Coach on a full-time basis.

York made an approach to the Virgin Group to buy the London Broncos in August 2001, with the aim of buying a Super League place for a proposed merged club to be based in York under a new name, York Wasps. This attempt was thrown out when Richard Branson rebuffed the offer as 'ridiculous, and speculative at best'.

In 2002, fervent club supporter David Hughes purchased the majority shareholding from Virgin in a major restructuring of the club. The Broncos moved once again, to play their home matches at Griffin Park as tenants of Brentford FC. 2003 marked the club's first Super League playoff appearance, losing in the first round to St. Helens 24–6 at Knowsley Road.

The 2005 season was marked by significant activity off the pitch as the club welcomed new chairman and majority shareholder Ian Lenagan who had bought 65% of the shares. This was followed by the announcement of a partnership with Harlequins Rugby Union Club that saw the club return to The Stoop Memorial Ground, this time formally renamed as Harlequins RL and adopting the host club's kit and crest for the 2006 season.

=== 2006–2011: Harlequins Rugby League ===
Ian Lenagan became the majority shareholder in the London Broncos in July 2005 and within a week of his arrival, the team was formally renamed "Harlequins Rugby League". Press releases of the time suggested that this would make the combined club "a powerhouse in both codes" according to Mark Evans of the Union club and provide a "very, very strong future for rugby league in the capital" according to Lenagan. The arrangement between the clubs was described as a "long-term partnership".

At the time of the announcement there were many heralded benefits of the two clubs sharing and pooling resources; both clubs were to play at the same ground and have access to the training facilities at the Richardson Evans Playing Fields, Roehampton Vale. In practice, however, there was little or no integration between the rugby codes, no joint player development, and the administrative and commercial resource sharing amounted to the RU club merely allowing the RL club some shared office space.

The sole integration programme appeared to be a combined fund raising lottery – which folded long before the Rugby League club permanently left the Twickenham Stoop – and two "double header" match days. These were in 2006, in which the Union side played first, followed by the League side, but the lengthy two hour gap between fixtures was a deterrent to the Union supporters and the majority had left the ground before the kick-off of the League fixture. Plymouth Albion and Leeds Carnegie were the Union opponents for the Union team whilst the Rugby League team played Huddersfield and St Helens.

On the field, the Harlequins RL club started with an encouraging 8,213 watching the home game against St Helens on 11 February 2006 but a heavy loss was followed by further consecutive home losses against Wakefield and Castleford, before a thumping 0–60 home defeat to Leeds. It was not until the fifth home game in the season that the team won at the Twickenham Stoop against Catalans Dragons in round 9.

Whilst the club started with a goal of 5,500 average home ground attendance by mid 2007. the actual attendance average was around the 3,500 level.

A 38–18 loss against bottom of the table Catalan, who were in their first year in Super League, was followed by a close home defeat to a Wigan team after each team scored. Harlequins were at this point 9th out of 12.

On 8 July 2006, Ian Lenagan removed Tony Rea as head coach, and moved him "upstairs" to a position on the club's board of directors. In his place, Brian McDermott, an assistant coach at Leeds Rhinos, was appointed as head coach. Results at home improved, taking Harlequins RL to 7th place in Super League XI.

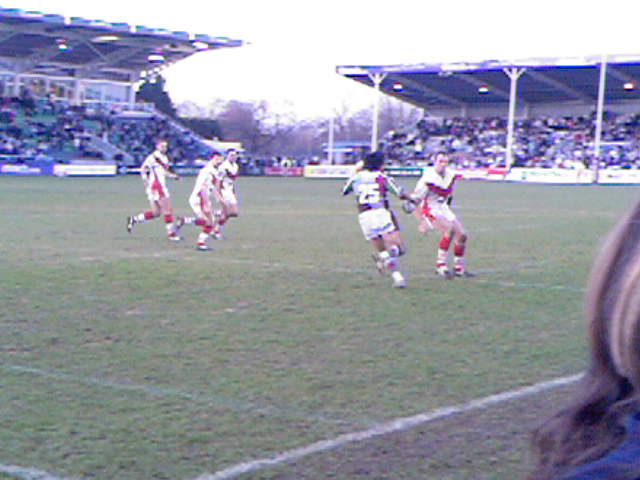
Harlequins RL vs St Helens in 2006, the first game under the new guise

The 2007 season saw the team pull off an incredible opening win against St Helens and by 7 July the team was 5th in the table, but a collapse in form in the second half of the season – a recurring theme of the McDermott reign – saw the team win only once from eight matches to finish 9th.

At the end of the season, Ian Lenagan took over control of fellow Super League side Wigan Warriors and was given two years to sell his Harlequins shares.

In 2008, Harlequins RL got off to a good start, winning six from the first ten games, but as was customary a second half of the season collapse saw the club won only five from the last seventeen games to finish in 9th again.

In 2009, the club was playing very well in the early part of the season, which extended up until 12 June with ten wins from sixteen, but yet again the rest of the season proved miserable with one win from 12 seeing the club slide from 5th position to 11th.

Home supporters were particularly displeased with the 0–48 home loss to Castleford and the 0–36 half time score v Bradford.

By round 12 in 2010, the club had won only one game from the first eleven and were bottom of the table, meaning that McDermott had seen the team win just twice in twenty three games, and at half-time away at Wigan the team were losing 24–6 before pulling off their finest comeback as Harlequins RL to win 38–26. That result seemed to spur the team into life briefly, with three more wins from the next four, but after that there was an end-of-season collapse to join the start-of-season collapse.

The round 25 game at Catalan saw the Quins bottom of the table with Catalan on a similar points tally and the game looked likely to decide who would finish bottom. The Quins were winning 16–12 with just a couple of minutes to go when Catalan were over the line with ball in hand, but Will Sharp stripped the ball from the Dragons player and Quins managed to hold out for the win.

The final game under McDermott saw Harlequins lose to Warrington at home; 7 wins from his last 38 games.

It was a shock to Harlequins RL supporters to see McDermott's assistant take over but this bizarre decision seemed to be warranted as Rob Powell oversaw three wins from their first three matches, placing them at the top of the ladder.

Away wins at Leeds Rhinos and St Helens seemed to herald a new dawn, however, the club's run of success was ended with a club record 82–6 defeat to Warrington Wolves on 20 March 2011 and the team were within a try of losing by the all-time Super League record margin of −80 held by Salford City Reds.

After that the Harlequins only won two more games in the next six months and the Harlequins RL era drew to a close when the club played St Helens in their final game under that name on 10 September 2011.

=== 2012–2025: Return to London Broncos ===
The club announced on 1 November 2011 that it would be returning to the London Broncos name from the 2012 season. In addition, the team unveiled a new logo as well as new colours of black, light blue and silver. On 4 February, London Broncos played their first competitive match against St. Helens since reverting to that name. The game was won by St. Helens 34–24 in front of a 4,924 crowd, which was higher than all of their attendances in the year before. In the match, seven players made their debuts for the club.

In the 2012 season, the Broncos played two home games "on the road" away from the Twickenham Stoop, on 6 June vs Bradford at Leyton Orient FC's Brisbane Road, where they were narrowly beaten 22–29 in front of 2,844 fans, and on 20 June vs Hull F.C. at Gillingham FC's Priestfield Stadium, as recognition for the work Medway Dragons had done in growing rugby league in Kent. The game proved to be popular with 3,930 turning up to watch London narrowly beaten 12–14 by Hull.

Tony Rea was appointed as the club's head coach for a second time in August 2012 taking over from Rob Powell. In 2013, London Broncos used four venues for their home games with the majority being played at the Twickenham Stoop. On 8 June 2013, London once again played a home game at Priestfield Stadium, this time being heavily beaten 82–10 by Warrington in front of 3,041 fans. On 28 March, London had to play a home game at Esher RFC's ground at Molesey Road due to a waterlogged pitch at the Stoop. For the next home game on 6 April, Harlequins RU didn't allow London to use the Stoop due to a Heineken Cup game, forcing them to play Bradford at Adams Park in High Wycombe.

London Broncos had a successful Challenge Cup campaign in 2013, reaching the semi-finals for the first time since their Wembley appearance in 1999. In round 4, London beat part-timers Featherstone Rovers 24–12 and in round 5, defeated Bradford 25–16. In the quarter-finals, London Broncos beat part-timers Sheffield Eagles 29–10 to book a place in the semi-finals. On 27 July, London Broncos' dream of reaching the Wembley final for the second time came emphatically to an end with a televised 0–70 defeat by Wigan, a record score in a Challenge Cup semi-final.

On 29 June 2013, London Broncos announced the loan signing of Australian Jamie Soward until the end of the season. Soward quickly became a fans favourite with a man of the match performance on his debut v Salford (scoring a try and kicking five goals) and received a standing ovation from the crowd despite being defeated 30–44. Soward put in impressive performances in his short venture in England and in 9 games scored 67 points (5 tries, 23 goals, 1 drop goal).

The club's financial struggles were made evident when, on 20 November 2013, the club announced that it would have to enter administration in ten working days if a new owner was not found. On 3 December 2013, London Broncos announced, "The club will be instructing lawyers to file a further notice of intention to appoint administrators at court, which shall be effective for 10 business days". The club's saviour David Hughes later decided to carry on putting millions into the club.

On 13 December 2013, London Broncos announced a move to the Hive Stadium in Canons Park, the new home of Barnet F.C., from the start of the 2014 season. After London lost 21 players from their 2013 squad, they faced a huge task to build up their squad again with minimal finances. The Broncos managed to retain twelve players from 2013 and in the off season signed 16 players (five on loan) including Tongan international fullback Nesiasi Mataitonga and former England international hooker Scott Moore. Tony Rea quit as coach following Broncos' 11-game winless start to the new Super League season. Assistant coach Joey Grima became head coach, having been asked to take charge for the rest of the season and next.Rea replaced by Grima at Broncos. Despite several closely contested games in 2014, the team struggled throughout the season against teams with far more strength in depth and much greater financial resources, and finished the season bottom of the Super League table, with only one win.

A supporters club (the LBSA) was founded in 2014 in order for fans to have a voice regarding their team. In July, at a pre-match lunch hosted by former Broncos Martin Offiah and Shaun Edwards, the LBSA announced its Hall of Fame, with six inaugural inductees: Reg Bowden, Peter Gill, Mark Johnson, Hussain M’Barki, Rob Purdham, Steele Retchless and Scott Roskell.

==== 2015–2018: Relegation to the Championship ====
On 13 July 2014, London Broncos were relegated from the Super League to the Championship after a 72–12 loss to Warrington.

The capital club had competed in all 19 Super League seasons and this was the club's first relegation since 1984 as Fulham RL and the first time the club competed in the second tier since 1995.

Relegation bought another mass exodus of players, with the club losing many key homegrown and non-homegrown players.

In the 2015 season, London Broncos had a poor season. Head Coach Joey Grima had issues with senior players like Foran, Cordoba, Mathers, Adamson and Lovegrove which meant that by about a third of the way into the season none were selectable. The club trained players went into the double digits that season but of them only Alex Walker and Matt Davis would be successful in the long run. As pressure built, Grima resigned leaving Andrew Henderson in charge. Henderson had too much to do and Broncos were a long way short of making the Super 8 play-offs that would have given them a chance of promotion back to Super League. However a surprise away win in the qualifiers at Dewsbury Rams saw the club make it to the Championship Shield Grand Final in Widnes but they were heavily beaten 36–4 by Featherstone Rovers.

In 2016, London Broncos moved to Ealing having signed a three-year deal to play at the Trailfinders Sports Ground, home of rugby union side Ealing Trailfinders. On 3 July, the Broncos beat Dewsbury 36–6 to secure a place in the Qualifiers against the bottom 4 Super League teams for promotion. Henderson signed Penrith Panthers playmaker Jamie Soward, who had previously played for the Broncos in 2013, until the end of the season. London Broncos finished 2nd in the Championship heading into the Qualifiers for a place in the Super League. The Broncos started the Qualifiers with a narrow 34–30 away loss to Leigh. London then won their first game in the competition, setting a record club score victory over Batley 76–16 at the Trailfinders Sports Ground. The following week, Henderson's team put in a gutsy performance despite going down 28–42 to Leeds in front of a record rugby league crowd at the ground of 1,845 in front of the Sky Sports cameras.

In 2017 the Broncos again finished second and reached the qualifiers for a second consecutive year. The team put in several impressive performances including a close 38–40 loss against Warrington Wolves; lost by just two points against Catalans Dragons away and came within six points of beating Hull KR. However the last two games were both hammerings whilst Broncos also blew the lead against Featherstone to draw on the hooter and only actually beat Halifax. Shortly after the season finished Andrew Henderson, who had successfully managed the club through a troubled period, left to help manage Warrington Wolves.

Danny Ward was promoted to Head Coach and in 2018 the Broncos got off to a flying start with seven wins in a row to go first in the Championship table with five straight wins, breaking their previous record for the best start to a season with a 68–12 home victory over Batley Bulldogs. A mid-season slump saw the club needing an improbable sequence of results to make the play-offs but six wins and a draw from the last seven saw the club achieve exactly that and make Super 8s – the Qualifiers.

==== 2018–2025: Promotion and subsequent relegation ====
Following a strong 2018 campaign in the Championship, Danny Ward carried off the Championship Head Coach of the Year Award at the end of season awards dinner held at the Principal Hotel in Manchester. The Broncos finished second in the regular season and commenced their Super 8s – Qualifiers campaign with a one-point win over the Widnes Vikings in which Jarrod Sammut kicked a vital 79th minute drop goal to secure the victory. This good start was followed up with key victories over Salford, Toulouse and Halifax to leave the Broncos with 8 points in the Qualifiers table sitting in fifth behind the Toronto Wolfpack in fourth, which meant London faced the Wolfpack away at the Lamport Stadium in Toronto on 7 October 2018 to decide the final Super League place in the so-called 'Million Pound Game'. London won a very tense and defensive game 4–2, thus earning promotion to Super League for the 2019 season. However, in spite of handing table leaders St Helens two of their three losses in the 2019 season, and several other notable wins against stronger opponents, Broncos were relegated after only one season back in the top flight, after losing their final game of the season to Wakefield.

With the entire 2020 Championship season cancelled due to the COVID-19 pandemic, the RFL advised the Broncos that their present ground at Ealing would be deemed as unsuitable for top level matches should they return to the Super League, so in December 2020 the club entered into discussions with AFC Wimbledon to groundshare at their newly built Plough Lane stadium in Wimbledon. The agreement was confirmed in mid July 2021 and the club played its first game at its new home in January 2022, a pre-season friendly against Widnes.

In the 2022 RFL Championship season, London started poorly and for most of the season were in the relegation zone. The club managed to win four of their last ten matches in the league to avoid relegation and finish 11th on the table. The 2023 RFL Championship season saw London finish 5th in the table and qualify for the playoffs. They would go on to defeat Sheffield in the opening playoff game and then beat league leaders Featherstone, who had finished 18 points above them in the regular season, to reach the playoff final. London would then go on to upset Toulouse Olympique in the Million Pound Game 18–14 to seal a spectacular return to the Super League.

London started the 2024 Super League season with ten consecutive losses where they conceded nearly 40 points a game. London earned their first win in round 11 against fellow strugglers Hull F.C., recording a 34–18 victory. Further victories came in an upset against play-off chasers Catalans Dragons and the return fixture against Hull F.C. The Broncos finished bottom of the table on the final day of the season, following a 0–54 defeat to Warrington Wolves, having entered the matchweek one point difference higher than Hull F.C. At the end of the season, David Hughes, who had owned and funded the club for 27 years, announced he was walking away from the club. From October 2024, discussions and crowdfunding efforts began to save the club from closure and continue a professional rugby league presence in London. On 24 October 2024, London were relegated back to the Championship through the IMG grading system.

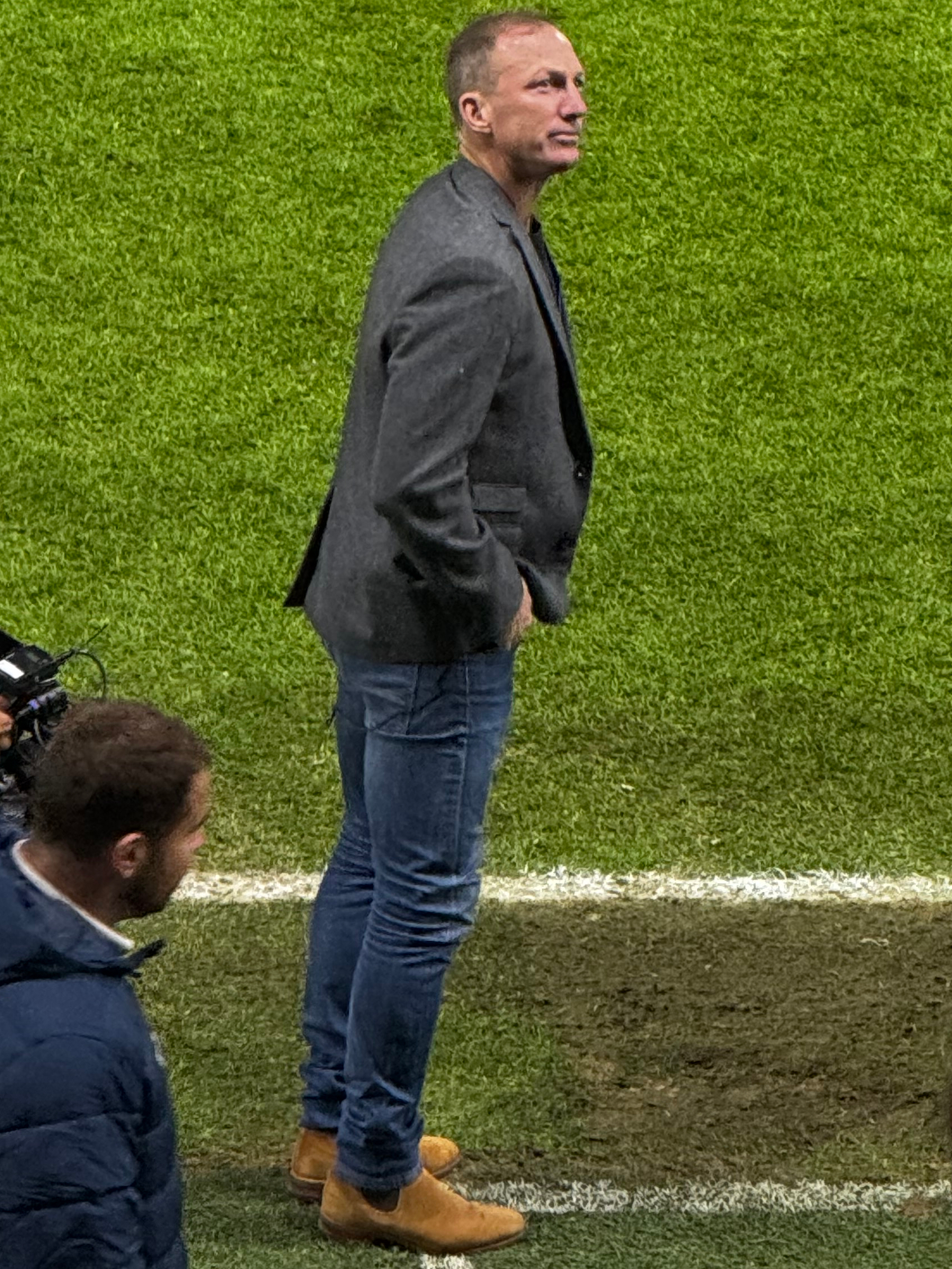
Darren Lockyer pitchside at London in January 2026

=== 2026: Rebranding and Super League bid ===
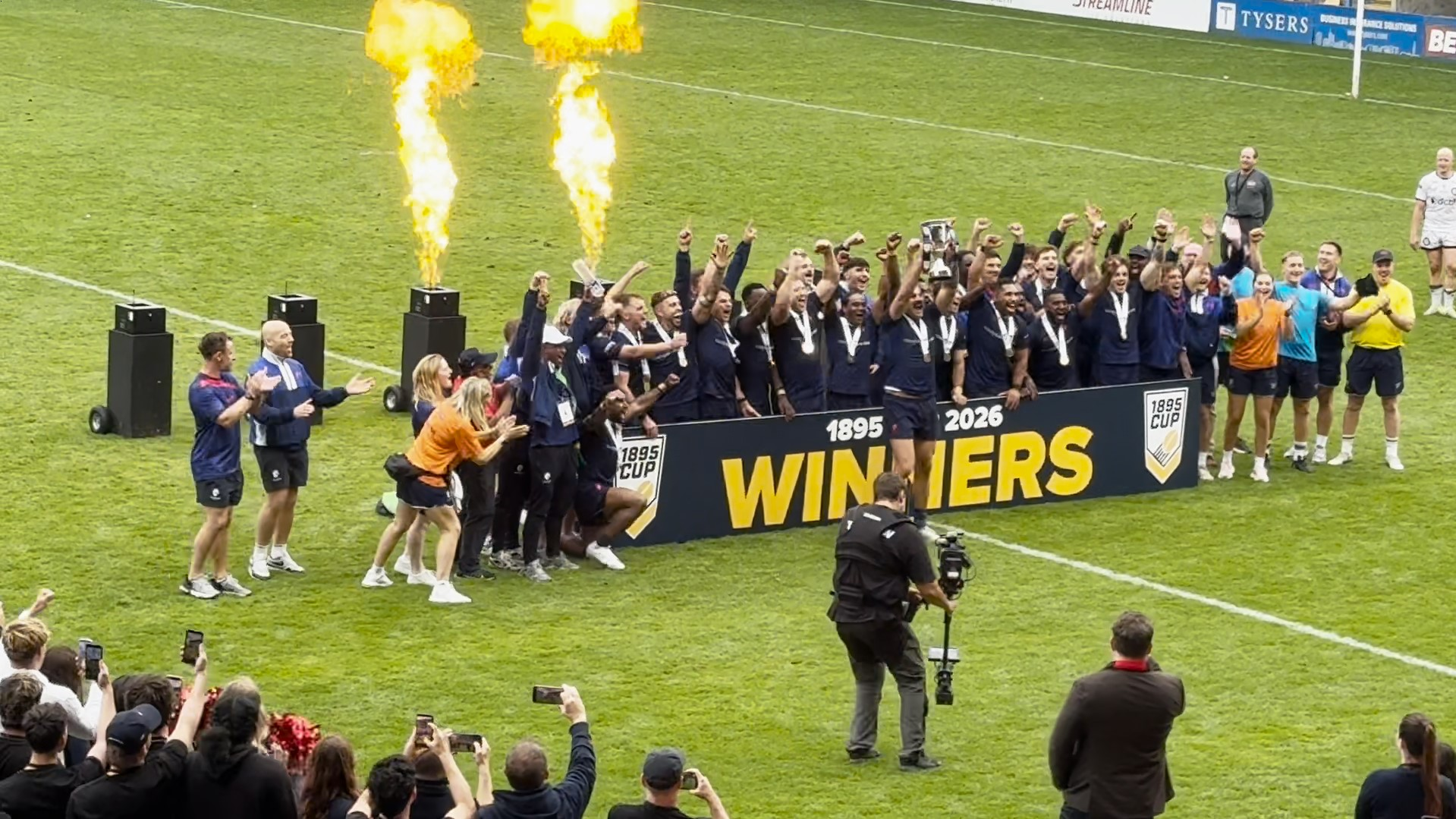
London Broncos winning the 2026 RFL 1895 Cup

The club was purchased in April 2025 by former Leeds Rhinos CEO Gary Hetherington, who planned to develop a new ownership group for the 2026 season, and reinstate the London Player Academy. Australian sports advisory firm Freshwater Strategy compiled a 110-page strategy and a ten-point plan. In September 2025, former Brisbane Broncos captain, Darren Lockyer and businessman Grant Wechsel purchased a 90% share of the London Broncos, with the aim of being one of the two new expansion teams for the 2026 Super League. The new consortium is backed by the Brisbane Broncos, rekindling a historic link between the two clubs dating back to the 1990s. Jason Demetriou was appointed head coach for the 2026–2027 seasons, with former head coach Mike Eccles becoming Director of Rugby. The Broncos signed Kangaroos prop Reagan Campbell-Gillard and Tongan international hooker Siliva Havili.

In October 2025, the club’s application to join the expanded 14-team Super League for the 2026 season was rejected by the IMG independent panel, which was led by Lord Caine and consisted of seven people, with the majority being RFL non-Executive Directors who were tied to, or paid by, the RFL. It could be suggested that this panel merely rubber stamped the top three teams who were not in Super League already as determined by the IMG ratings. Bradford gained a top ten IMG rating despite finishing no higher than third in the Championship, and were picked first, then York and Toulouse, leaving the Broncos to remain in the Betfred Championship League, despite the recent high-profile takeover and recruitment drive. Following the decision, the club’s ownership group confirmed their commitment to the long-term vision, emphasising that they will compete in the Championship for the 2026 season with the goal of securing a Super League place in the future.

In November 2025, the club moved its training and administrative base to Hazelwood in Sunbury-on-Thames. The facility had been vacated by professional rugby union team London Irish who entered administration in 2023 and whose amateur teams are based at the facility.

The London club won their first match following the takeover 44–12 at home to Widnes on 18 January 2026. A week later, they set a new club record for largest victory in an 86–0 win against Wests Warriors in the Challenge Cup; this was the first time the club played a competitive fixture against another London team. On 8 June, London recorded the biggest win of any side in the top two divisions in the 131-year history of rugby league as they defeated North Wales 134-0. On 31 August 2026, London won the 1895 Cup defeating Widnes in the final.

== Stadium ==
The Broncos have played home matches at numerous different grounds around London since the club's original formation. In 2021 they hoped to move their home ground to Plough Lane stadium in Wimbledon, as tenants of AFC Wimbledon, looking to agree a ten-year lease with break and extension clauses. Until an arrangement to use Plough Lane was reached, the club continued to play at Trailfinders Sports Ground. The Broncos finally began play at Plough Lane in 2022.

== Colours and badge ==
=== Colours ===
The original Fulham team wore an all black kit, with a broad white chevron, bordered with red, across the chest. As London Crusaders, the kit used the same colours, but in a variety of designs over the seasons. London Broncos wore red, yellow and blue also in a variety of styles, with red being the predominant colour for the last 5 years of their existence. When the club became known as Harlequins RL they adopted the colours of host rugby union side Harlequins. When the club returned to being known as the London Broncos, the home kit was black with a light blue trim and the reverse for the away kit. In 2015, the London Broncos reverted to their original Fulham colours, much to the approval of long-term fans, with their home kit being predominantly black with a broad white chevron and a red strip bordering the chevron. The away kit is predominantly red with a broad black chevron with white border. For the 2022 season, the club will play in blue and yellow, referencing the traditional colours of their new hosts in Wimbledon. The club have indicated that they will revert to black from 2023.

=== Badge ===
Club Logo for used for 2012-2017 Seasons

As Fulham RLFC, the club utilised the badge of the host football club, which at the time was the emblem of the local administrative borough, Hammersmith and Fulham. The first badge as London Broncos was a red and white crest with a horse's head on the front with London inscripted on the top. This was worn, with some minor adjustments, until 2006 when the club became known as Harlequins RL.

As Harlequins RL, the club crest was the same as that of the host rugby union team. This was used up until 2011.

In 2012, the club reverted to the name London Broncos and created a new crest, based on the original Broncos badge but featuring a horse's head in a modern stylised fashion, depicted in silver and blue.

== Kit sponsors and manufacturers ==
Years	Kit Manufacturer	Main Shirt Sponsor
1980–85	Mansport	none
1993	Canterbury	none
1994–1998	Puma	Foster's
1999–2003	Canterbury	Virgin
2004	ISC	Bartercard
2005	Carlotti	Streetwise Sports
2006–2008	Kooga	none
2009	Puma	St Mary's University College
2010	Puma	WIN plc
2011	Puma	Quins RL Foundation
2012–2013	MKK Sports	Selco Builders Warehouse
2014	Jako	Selco Builders Warehouse
2015	Jako	Towergate Partnership
2016	Kappa	Rugbytel
2017	Kappa	Simply Air Conditioning
2018–2019	Errea	Bartercard
2020	BSK	Bartercard
2021–2022	APX Performance	CTM
2023	Errea	Pinata Smash Lings
2024	Errea	BrewDog
2025	Paladin Sports	BrewDog
2026	Reebok	CashConverters

== 2027 squad ==
2027 London Broncos squad
First team squad			Coaching staff
(Nigeria) Sadiq Adebiyi – LF, SR, PR; (Ireland) Lewis Bienek – PR; (Australia) Reagan Campbell-Gillard (c) – PR; (England) Jack Croft – SR, CE; (England) Ted Davidson – CE; (England) Sam Davis – HK; (Papua New Guinea) Finley Glare – HK, SO, SH; (England) Bobby Hartley – SR; (Tonga) Siliva Havili – LF, HK; (Australia) Dean Hawkins – SH, SO; (England) Ben Hursey-Hord – PR	(Papua New Guinea) Epel Kapinias – PR, LF; (Ireland) Toby King – CE; (Papua New Guinea) Robert Mathias – CE, SR; (England) Jimmy Meadows – SO, FB; (Papua New Guinea) Morea Morea – FB; (Scotland) Rob Oakley – LF, SR; (Australia) Connor O'Beirne – SH, LF; (Ireland) Joe Philbin – PR, LF, SR	(England) Tommy Porter – HK; (England) Jake Ramsden – SR; (Papua New Guinea) Jeremiah Simbiken – SR, LF; (England) Elliot Wallis – WG; (England) Neil Tchamambe – WG; (England) Liam Tindall – WG; (England) Marcus Stock – LF, SR, PR; (England) Preston Ward – CE, SR; (Australia) Brandon Webster-Mansfield – CE; (Scotland) Alex Walker – FB	Head coach: (Australia) Jason Demetriou; Assistant coach: (England) Danny Ward; Legend: (c) Captain(s); (vc) Vice-captain(s); (red card) = suspended; = injured; Updated: Source(s):

== 2027 transfers ==
=== Gains ===
Player	From	Contract	Date
(Ireland) Toby King	Warrington Wolves	2 years	6 June 2026
(Ireland) Joe Philbin	Warrington Wolves	2 years	26 June 2026
(England) Neil Tchamambe	Wakefield Trinity	2 years	15 November 2026
(England) Preston Ward	Hull FC	2 years	20 November 2026

=== Losses ===
Player	To	Contract	Date
(Tanzania) Marly Bitungane	Perth Bears		5 October 2026
(Australia) Luke Smith	Perth Bears		5 October 2026
(Papua New Guinea) Gairo Voro	PNG Hunters	1 year	16 November 2026
(Papua New Guinea) Alex Max	PNG Hunters	1 year	20 November 2026

=== Retired ===
Player	Date
(England) Will Lovell	16 October 2026

== Club officials ==
=== Backroom staff ===
- Owners: Darren Lockyer, Grant Wechsel
- CEO: Gary Hetherington
- Football Administrator: Dom Fenton
- Head of Community & Player Welfare: John Keyes
- Marketing & Commercial: Lynsey Coleman

=== Coaching staff ===
- Head Coach: Jason Demetriou
- Assistant Coach: Danny Ward
- Head of Youth: Chris Baxter
- Academy & Reserves Head Coach: Kieran Robertson

=== List of head coaches ===
Up to and including 13 September 2026.

London Career	Coach	Played	Won	Drew	Lost	Win %
1980–1984	(England) Reg Bowden	140	73	3	64	53.21
1984–1986	(England) Roy Lester	56	27	1	28	49.11
1986–1987; 1988–1989	(England) Bill Goodwin	65	20	4	41	33.85
1987–1988	(England) Bev Risman	39	12	0	27	30.77
1989	(Australia) Phil Sullivan	4	2	0	2	50.00
1989–1993	(Australia) Ross Strudwick	129	62	7	60	50.78
1993–1994	(Australia) Tony Gordon	45	31	3	11	72.22
1994–1996	(Australia) Gary Greinke	58	31	1	26	54.31
1996–1998	(Australia) Tony Currie	83	42	4	37	53.01
1999	(Australia) Dan Stains	19	8	2	9	47.37
1999 (joint)	(Australia) Les Kiss & (Australia) Tony Rea	16	9	0	7	56.25
2000	(Australia) John Monie	25	4	0	21	16.00
2000–2006; 2012–2014	(Australia) Tony Rea	229	89	10	130	41.05
2006–2010	(England) Brian McDermott	124	47	3	74	39.11
2011–2012	(England) Rob Powell	52	12	1	39	24.04
2014–2015	(Australia) Joey Grima	19	2	0	17	10.53
2015–2017	(Scotland) Andrew Henderson	92	54	1	37	59.24
2018–2021	(England) Danny Ward	83	44	2	37	54.22
2021	(England) Tom Tsang	8	4	0	4	50.00
2022	(Jamaica) Jermaine Coleman	13	1	1	11	11.54
2022–2025	(England) Mike Eccles	104	41	0	63	39.00
2026–	(Australia) Jason Demetriou	32	30	0	2	93.75

== Seasons ==
Season (As Fulham R.L.F.C.)	League									Premiership	Challenge Cup	Other Competitions		Top try scorer		Top points scorer	
Season (As Fulham R.L.F.C.)	Division	P	W	D	L	F	A	Pts	Pos	Premiership	Challenge Cup	Other Competitions		Name	Tries	Name	Points
1980–81	Division 2	28	20	0	8	447	237	40	3rd	Did not qualify	R1	League Cup	R2	Mal Aspey	16	Iain MacCorquodale	171
1981–82	Division 1	30	9	1	20	365	539	19	13th	Did not qualify	R2	League Cup	R1	John Crossley	15	Steve Diamond	206
1982–83	Division 2	32	27	1	4	699	294	55	1st	Did not qualify	R2	League Cup	R1	John Crossley	27	Steve Diamond	308
1983–84	Division 1	30	9	1	20	401	694	19	13th	Did not qualify	R2	League Cup	R1	Hussein M'Barki	17	Steve Diamond	177
1984–85	Division 2	28	16	1	11	521	526	33	8th	Did not qualify	R1	League Cup	R1	Mike Davis / Steve Mills	17	Chris Wilkinson	157
1985–86	Division 2	34	16	1	17	679	709	33	9th	Did not qualify	R1	League Cup	R1				
1986–87	Division 2	28	8	2	18	461	632	18	12th	Did not qualify	R1	League Cup	R1				
1987–88	Division 2	28	10	0	18	382	559	20	17th	Did not qualify	R1	League Cup	PR				
1988–89	Division 2	28	10	0	18	464	650	20	15th	Did not qualify	R1	League Cup	PR				
1989–90	Division 2	28	16	2	10	496	488	34	8th	Did not qualify	R2	League Cup	R1				
1990–91	Division 2	28	17	2	9	450	338	36	7th	Did not qualify	R1	League Cup	R1				
Season (As London Crusaders)	League									Premiership	Challenge Cup	Other Competitions		Top try scorer		Top points scorer	
Season (As London Crusaders)	Division	P	W	D	L	F	A	Pts	Pos	Premiership	Challenge Cup	Other Competitions		Name	Tries	Name	Points
1991–92	Division 2	28	14	0	14	428	483	28	4th	Did not qualify	R2	League Cup	R1				
1992–93	Division 2	28	12	2	14	534	562	26	5th	Did not qualify	R1	League Cup	R2				
1993–94	Division 2	30	21	2	7	842	522	44	3rd	Did not qualify	R4	League Cup	QR				
Season (As London Broncos)	League									Premiership / Play-offs	Challenge Cup	Other Competitions		Top try scorer		Top points scorer	
Season (As London Broncos)	Division	P	W	D	L	F	A	Pts	Pos	Premiership / Play-offs	Challenge Cup	Other Competitions		Name	Tries	Name	Points
1994–95	Division 2	30	20	1	9	732	480	41	4th	Did not qualify	R4	League Cup	R2				
1995–96	Division 1	20	7	0	13	466	585	14	10th	Not held		League Cup	R3				
1996	Super League	22	12	1	9	611	462	25	4th	Lost in Semi Finals	R4						
1997	Super League	22	15	3	4	616	418	33	2nd	Lost in Qualifying Playoffs	R5						
1998	Super League	23	10	0	13	415	476	20	7th	Did not qualify	SF						
1999	Super League	30	6	1	23	526	916	13	12th	Did not qualify	RU						
2000	Super League	28	6	0	22	456	770	12	11th	Did not qualify	R5						
2001	Super League	28	13	1	14	644	603	27	6th	Did not qualify	R5						
2002	Super League	28	13	1	14	661	635	27	8th	Did not qualify	R5						
2003	Super League	28	14	2	12	643	696	30	5th	Lost in Elimination Playoffs	R5						
2004	Super League	28	7	1	21	561	968	15	10th	Did not qualify	R5						
2005	Super League	28	13	2	13	800	718	28	6th	Lost in Elimination Playoffs	QF						
Season (As Harlequins RL)	League									Play-offs	Challenge Cup	Other Competitions		Top try scorer		Top points scorer	
Season (As Harlequins RL)	Division	P	W	D	L	F	A	Pts	Pos	Play-offs	Challenge Cup	Other Competitions		Name	Goals	Name	Goals
2006	Super League	28	11	1	16	556	823	23	7th	Did not qualify	QF						
2007	Super League	27	10	3	14	495	636	23	9th	Did not qualify	QF						
2008	Super League	27	11	0	16	569	763	22	9th	Did not qualify	R5						
2009	Super League	27	11	0	16	591	691	22	11th	Did not qualify	R4						
2010	Super League	27	7	0	20	494	838	14	13th	Did not qualify	R5						
2011	Super League	27	6	1	20	524	951	13	12th	Did not qualify	R5						
Season (As London Broncos)	League									Play-offs	Challenge Cup	Other Competitions		Top try scorer		Top points scorer	
Season (As London Broncos)	Division	P	W	D	L	F	A	Pts	Pos	Play-offs	Challenge Cup	Other Competitions		Name	Goals	Name	Goals
2012	Super League	27	7	0	20	588	890	14	12th	Did not qualify	QF						
2013	Super League	27	5	2	20	487	946	12	13th	Did not qualify	SF						
2014	Super League	27	1	0	26	438	1237	2	14th	Did not qualify	R4						
2015	Championship	23	12	0	11	538	510	24	7th	Lost in Shield Final	R5						
2016	Championship	23	17	0	6	702	444	34	2nd	Did not qualify	R4						
2016	The Qualifiers	7	3	0	4	221	212	6	6th	Did not qualify	R4						
2017	Championship	23	18	0	5	832	406	36	2nd	Did not qualify	R4						
2017	The Qualifiers	7	1	1	5	174	220	3	6th	Did not qualify	R4						
2018	Championship	23	16	1	6	907	423	33	2nd	Won in Million Pound Game	R5						
2018	The Qualifiers	7	4	0	3	161	164	8	5th	Won in Million Pound Game	R5						
2019	Super League	29	10	0	19	505	787	20	12th	Did not qualify	R5						
2020	Championship (Note: The 2020 Championship was abandoned due to the COVID-19 pandemic in the United Kingdom. Statistics shown are those at time of abandonment and are not official.)	5	4	0	1	120	92	8	4th	None Played	R4						
2021	Championship	20	11	1	8	552	579	21	7th	Did not qualify	R4 (Note: Officially round 2 due to the competitions temporary restructure in 2021.)	1895 Cup	R2	Abbas Miski	18	Chris Hankinson	204
2022	Championship	27	8	1	18	548	740	17	11th	Did not qualify	R4			Paul Ulberg	16	Oli Leyland	112
2023	Championship	27	16	0	11	600	552	32	5th	Won in Grand Final	R6			Alex Walker	19	Oli Leyland	140
2024	Super League	27	3	0	24	317	916	6	12th	Did not qualify	R6			Josh Rourke	8	Oli Leyland	93
2025	Championship	24	8	0	16	468	548	16	10th	Did not qualify	R2	1895 Cup	QF				
Season (As London Broncos)	League									Play-offs	Challenge Cup	Other Competitions		Top try scorer		Top points scorer	
Season (As London Broncos)	Division	P	W	D	L	F	A	Pts	Pos	Play-offs	Challenge Cup	Other Competitions		Name	Goals	Name	Goals
2026	Championship	24	23	0	1	1511	296	46	1st	Won in Grand Final	R3	1895 Cup	W				

=== Supporters' Player of the Year Awards ===
The London Broncos Supporters Association (LBSA) inaugurated the Fan's Player and Young Player of the Year awards in 2014, with Matt Cook and Joe Keyes the first winners. The award has been held every year, with the exception of the cancelled 2020 season. In 2022, a Women's Player of the Year was awarded for the first time.

List of Player of the Year winners
Year	Men's Player of the Year	Men's Young Player of the Year	Women's Player of the Year	Ref.
2014	(England) Matt Cook	(Ireland) Joe Keyes	—N/a	
2015	(Fiji) Wes Naiqama	(England) Matt Davis	—N/a	
2016	(Wales) Rhys Williams	(England) James Cunningham	—N/a	
2017	(Malta) Jarrod Sammut	(England) Alex Walker	—N/a	
2018	(England) Eddie Battye	(England) Alex Walker (2)	—N/a	
2019	(England) Jordan Abdull	(England) Rob Butler	—N/a	
2020	season cancelled			
2021	(England) Chris Hankinson	(England) Gideon Boafo	—N/a	
2022	(Italy) Dean Parata	(England) Oli Leyland	(United States) Courtney Treco	
2023	(England) Oli Leyland	(England) Bill Leyland	(United States) Courtney Treco (2)	
2024	(England) Jacob Jones	(England) Oli Leyland (2)	(Netherlands) Nicole Kennedy	

== Honours ==
League

- Division 1 / Super League:

Runners up (1): 1997

- Division 2 / Championship:

Winners (3): 1982–83, 2023, 2026
Runners up (3): 2016, 2017, 2018
League Leaders Shield (1): 2026
- Million Pound Game:

Winners (1): 2018

Domestic Cups

- Challenge Cup:

Runners up (1): 1999

•1895 Cup:
Winners (1): 2026

== Player records ==
Up to and including 13 September 2026. Current players appear in bold.

=== Most appearances ===
Rank	Player	Apps.	Points	London Career
1	(England) Will Lovell (№ 529)	210	92	2012-2014; 2018-
2	(Scotland) **Alex Walker** (№ 567)	204	400	2014–2019; 2022–
3	(United States) Steele Retchless (№ 341)	202	64	1998-2004
4=	(England) Rob Purdham (№ 392)	197	484	2002–2011
4=	(Australia) Chad Randall (№ 458)	197	193	2004–2013
6	(Australia) Steve Rosolen (№ 211)	169	124	1991–1998
7	(Australia) Luke Dorn (№ 440)	166	436	2005–2006; 2009–2013
8	(Morocco) Hussein M'Barki (№ 29)	165	269	1981–1984; 1988–1992
9	(England) Chris Melling (№ 465)	163	188	2007–2013
10=	(England) Tony Kinsey (№ 17)	157	74	1980–1986
10=	(Australia) Mat Toshack (№ 335)	157	124	1998–2004
10=	(Wales) Rhys Williams (№ 569)	157	420	2015–2019

=== Most tries ===
Rank	Player	Tries	Apps.	London Career
1	(Australia) Luke Dorn (№ 440)	109	166	2005–2006; 2009–2013
2	(Wales) Rhys Williams (№ 569)	105	157	2015–2019
3	(Scotland) **Alex Walker** (№ 567)	99	204	2014–2019; 2022–
4	(England) Kieran Dixon (№ 518)	97	136	2012–2014; 2017–2020
5	(Australia) Scott Roskell (№ 221)	85	143	1992–1997
6=	(Morocco) Hussein M'Barki (№ 29)	75	165	1981–1984; 1988–1992
6=	(Australia) Dennis Moran (№ 379)	75	115	2001–2004
8	(England) Iliess Macani (№ 544)	68	140	2013–2016; 2022–2024
9	(South Africa) Mark Johnson (№ 243)	66	73	1992–1995
10	(New Zealand) Mark Riley (№ 233)	62	94	1992–1996

=== Most goals ===
Rank	Player	Goals	D-Gls.	Apps.	London Career
1	(Wales) Steve Diamond (№ 25)	305	4	109	1981–1984
2	(England) Paul Sykes (№ 384)	287	4	137	2001–2007
3	(Malta) Jarrod Sammut (№ 578)	200	4	75	2015; 2017–2018; 2021
4	(England) John Gallagher (№ 246)	196	2	51	1993–1995
5	(England) Kieran Dixon (№ 518)	190	0	136	2012–2014; 2017–2020
6	(Australia) Tony Martin (№ 311)	182	1	112	1996–1997; 2001–2003
7	(England) Rob Purdham (№ 392)	171	2	197	2002–2011
8	(England) Oli Leyland (№ 652)	170	1	95	2021–2024
9	(Australia) Brett Warton (№ 353)	154	0	63	1999–2001
10	(England) **Jimmy Meadows** (№ 616)	150	0	80	2018–2021; 2024; 2026-

=== Most points ===
Note: Tries scored before the 1983–84 season were worth 3pts

Rank	Player	Points	Apps.	London Career
1	(England) Paul Sykes (№ 384)	774	137	2001–2007
2	(England) Kieran Dixon (№ 518)	768	136	2012–2014; 2017–2020
3	(Wales) Steve Diamond (№ 25)	691	109	1981–1984
4	(Malta) Jarrod Sammut (№ 578)	620	75	2015; 2017–2018; 2021
5	(Australia) Tony Martin (№ 311)	533	112	1996–1997; 2001–2003
6	(England) Rob Purdham (№ 392)	484	197	2002–2011
7	(England) John Gallagher (№ 246)	470	51	1993–1995
8	(Australia) Luke Dorn (№ 440)	436	166	2005–2006; 2009–2013
9	(Wales) Rhys Williams (№ 569)	420	157	2015–2019
10	(England) Oli Leyland (№ 652)	401	95	2021–2024

Of current players, Alex Walker (№ 567) is highest on this list at 11th with 400 points in 204 games.

=== Hall of Fame ===
In 2014, the LBSA launched the club's Hall of Fame, and announced seven inaugural inductees. As of 2019, the Hall of Fame has 11 members:

- (England) Reg Bowden (Heritage № 7)
- (Australia) Peter Gill (Heritage № 291)
- (South Africa) Mark Johnson (Heritage № 243)
- (Morocco) Hussein M'Barki (Heritage № 29)
- (England) Rob Purdham (Heritage № 392)
- (United States) Steele Retchless (Heritage № 341)
- (Australia) Scott Roskell (Heritage № 221)
- (Australia) Tony Rea (Heritage № 276; Inducted 2015)
- (England) Tony Gourley (Heritage № 11; Inducted 2016)
- (Australia) Luke Dorn (Heritage № 440; Inducted 2019)
- (England) Roy Lester (Heritage № 10; Inducted 2019)

== Team records ==
Up to and including 7 June 2026 Note: The attendance for the match against Trafford Borough on 7 January 1990 is unknown.

=== Biggest wins ===
Rank	Margin	Match	Competition	Date
1	134	134-0 vs. North Wales Crusaders (A)	Championship	7 Jun 2026
2	88	106–18 vs. North Wales Crusaders (H)	Championship	28 Feb 2026
3=	86	92-6 vs. Goole Vikings (H)	Championship	9 Aug 2026
3=	86	86–0 vs. Wests Warriors (H)	Challenge Cup	25 Jan 2026
5	82	82–0 vs. Highfield (H)	League Cup	12 Nov 1995
6	78	84–6 vs. Swinton Lions (A)	Championship	22 Feb 2026
7	74	82–8 vs. Barrow Raiders (H)	Challenge Cup	21 May 2006
8	70	70–0 vs. Gateshead Thunder (A)	Challenge Cup	6 May 2011
9=	68	72–4 vs. Dewsbury Rams (H)	Challenge Cup	15 Apr 2012
9=	68	68–0 vs. Rochdale Hornets (H)	Championship	17 Jun 2018

=== Biggest defeats ===
Rank	Margin	Match	Competition	Date
1	76	6–82 vs. Warrington Wolves (A)	Super League	20 Mar 2011
2	72	10–82 vs. Warrington Wolves (H)	Super League	8 Jun 2013
3	70	0–70 vs. Wigan Warriors (N)	Challenge Cup	27 Jul 2013
4	66	6–72 vs. Whitehaven (A)	Lancashire Cup	14 Sep 1986
5	64	0–64 vs. Leigh Centurions (A)	Championship	24 Apr 2022
6	62	12–74 vs. Bradford Bulls (A)	Super League	9 Jun 1999
7=	60	12–72 vs. Warrington Wolves (A)	Super League	13 Jul 2014
7=	60	6–66 vs. Toulouse Olympique (H)	Championship	8 Aug 2021
7=	60	0–60 vs. Whitehaven (A)	Second Division	19 Feb 1989
7=	60	0–60 vs. Leeds Rhinos (H)	Super League	25 Mar 2006

=== Highest home attendances ===
Rank	Attendance	Match	Competition	Stadium	Date
1	15,013	vs. Wakefield Trinity	Challenge Cup	Craven Cottage	15 Feb 1981
2	12,583	vs. Leeds	League Cup	Craven Cottage	23 Nov 1980
3	12,301	vs. Huddersfield Giants	Super League	Twickenham Stoop	29 Apr 2006
4	10,432	vs. Australia	Tour Match	Craven Cottage	14 Nov 1982
5	10,014	vs. Wigan	Super League	The Valley	17 Aug 1996
6	9,846	vs. Brisbane Broncos	World Club Challenge	Twickenham Stoop	27 Jul 1997
7	9,638	vs. Paris Saint-Germain	Super League	The Valley	4 Apr 1996
8	9,552	vs. Wigan	Second Division	Craven Cottage	14 Sep 1980
9	9,481	vs. Hull	Challenge Cup	Craven Cottage	28 Feb 1982
10	9,166	vs. Bradford Bulls	Super League	Twickenham Stoop	31 Aug 1997

=== Lowest home attendances ===
Note: This list does not include matches during the COVID-19 affected 2020 and 2021 seasons.

Rank	Attendance	Match	Competition	Stadium	Date
1	225	vs. Hunslet Hawks	Championship Shield	The Hive	23 Aug 2015
2	245	vs. Highfield	Challenge Cup	National Sports Centre	4 Feb 1992
3	252	vs. Keighley	Second Division	National Sports Centre	10 Apr 1991
4	294	vs. Featherstone Rovers	Challenge Cup	Trailfinders Sports Ground	19 Mar 2016
5	347	vs. Whitehaven	Challenge Cup	Plough Lane	11 Mar 2023
6=	350	vs. Carlisle	Second Division	National Sports Centre	22 Dec 1991
6=	350	vs. Swinton	Second Division	National Sports Centre	10 Jan 1993
6=	350	vs. Oldham	Second Division	National Sports Centre	31 Mar 1993
6=	350	vs. Doncaster	Championship Shield	The Hive	8 Aug 2015
10	353	vs. Dewsbury Rams	Challenge Cup	The Rock	23 Apr 2023

== Women's team ==
In 2021, the London Broncos formed a women's team to take part the inaugural season of the RFL Women's Super League South. In 2022, the Broncos finished the regular season at the top of the table, but lost to Cardiff Demons in the Grand Final. The following season they took the 2023 Women's Super League South title with a 22–10 win over Cardiff in the Grand Final. In 2024, the Super League South became the Southern Women's Championship. On 7 September 2024, London defeated Cardiff 28–8 in the Grand Final of the Southern Championship to qualify for the National Championship final.

== See also ==
- Rugby Football League expansion
- Sport in London
