= Adrian Cambriani =

Welsh rugby footballer

Personal information
- Full name: Adrian O. Cambriani
- Born: first ¼ 1962 (age 63–64) Swansea, Wales

Playing information

Rugby union
Club
Years	Team	Pld	T	G	FG	P
1979–80	Swansea RFC

Rugby league
- Position: Wing
Club
Years	Team	Pld	T	G	FG	P
1980–84	Fulham RLFC	71	27	0	0	86
1984–85	Hull FC	1	0	0	0	0
1985–87	Fulham RLFC	50	15	0	0	60
	Total	122	42	0	0	146
Representative
Years	Team	Pld	T	G	FG	P
1981	Wales	3	0	0	0	0

Adrian O. Cambriani (birth registered first ¼ 1962) is a Welsh former rugby union, and professional rugby league footballer who played in the 1980s, and coached rugby union in the 2000s. He played club level rugby union (RU) for Swansea RFC, and representative level rugby league (RL) for Wales, and at club level for Fulham RLFC and Hull FC, as a wing, and coached club level rugby union (RU) for Penlan RFC.

== Background ==
Adrian Cambriani was born in Swansea, West Glamorgan, Wales.

== Club career ==
Cambriani started his career as a rugby union player with Swansea RFC. In 1980, at the age of 18, he switched to rugby league, joining the newly formed Fulham for a signing-on fee of £16,000 (based on increases in average earnings, this would be approximately £90,210 in 2015). He made his début in Fulham's first league game, and became the club's first try scorer with two tries in a 24–5 victory over Wigan.

== International honours ==
Cambriani won caps for Wales (RL) while at Fulham in 1981 3-caps.
