= 1998 London Broncos season =

- Super League III Rank: 7th
- Challenge Cup: Semi-final
- 1998 record: Wins: 13; draws: 0; losses: 14
- Points scored: For: 534; against: 570

Team information
- Chairman: Richard Branson
- Coach: Tony Currie
- Stadium: The Stoop
- Avg. attendance: 3,805
- High attendance: 7,963

Top scorers
- Tries: Chris Ryan - 12
- Goals: Terry Matterson - 32
- Points: Terry Matterson - 84
| Home colours | Away colours |
| ← 1997 | List of seasons | 1999 → |

The 1998 London Broncos season was the nineteenth in the club's history and their third season in the Super League. Coached by Tony Currie, the Broncos competed in Super League III and finished in 7th place. The club also reached the semi-final of the Challenge Cup.

== Super League table III ==
| | Team | Pld | W | D | L | PF | PA | PD | Pts | Qualification |
|---|---|---|---|---|---|---|---|---|---|---|
| 1 | Wigan Warriors | 23 | 21 | 0 | 2 | 762 | 222 | +540 | 42 | Play-offs Semi-final |
| 2 | Leeds Rhinos | 23 | 19 | 0 | 4 | 662 | 369 | +293 | 38 | Play-offs Qualifying Final |
| 3 | Halifax Blue Sox | 23 | 18 | 0 | 5 | 658 | 390 | +268 | 36 | Play-offs Qualifying Final |
| 4 | St Helens | 23 | 14 | 1 | 8 | 673 | 459 | +214 | 29 | Play-offs Eliminator Final |
| 5 | Bradford Bulls | 23 | 12 | 0 | 11 | 498 | 450 | +48 | 24 | Play-offs Eliminator Final |
| 6 | Castleford Tigers | 23 | 10 | 1 | 12 | 446 | 522 | -76 | 21 | |
| 7 | London Broncos | 23 | 10 | 0 | 13 | 415 | 476 | -61 | 20 | |
| 8 | Sheffield Eagles | 23 | 8 | 2 | 13 | 495 | 541 | -46 | 18 | |
| 9 | Hull Sharks | 23 | 8 | 0 | 15 | 421 | 574 | -153 | 16 | |
| 10 | Warrington Wolves | 23 | 7 | 1 | 15 | 411 | 645 | -234 | 15 | |
| 11 | Salford Reds | 23 | 6 | 1 | 16 | 319 | 575 | -256 | 13 | |
| 12 | Huddersfield Giants | 23 | 2 | 0 | 21 | 288 | 825 | -537 | 4 | |

== 1998 Challenge Cup ==
The London Broncos progressed to the semi-finals of the Cup, before losing to the Wigan Warriors by 38–8 in a one-sided game at the Alfred McAlpine Stadium, Huddersfield.

| Round | Date | Home team | Score | Away team | Attendance |
|---|---|---|---|---|---|
| Fourth round | 15 February 1998 | Batley Bulldogs | 20–44 | London Broncos | 956 |
| Fifth round | 1 March 1998 | London Broncos | 21–18 | Halifax Blue Sox | 3,092 |
| Quarter final | 15 March 1998 | London Broncos | 46–18 | Hull Kingston Rovers | 4,111 |
| Semi final | 29 March 1998 | London Broncos | 8–38 | Wigan Warriors | 11,058 |

== 1998 squad statistics ==
| Squad Number | Name | International country | Position | Age | Previous club | Appearances | Tries | Goals | Drop Goals | Points |
|---|---|---|---|---|---|---|---|---|---|---|
| 1 | Nick Mardon | (Scotland) | Fullback | 27 | Boroughmuir RU | 5 | 3 | 0 | 0 | 12 |
| 2 | Abraham Fatnowna | (Australia) | Wing | 24 | Workington Town | 7 | 2 | 0 | 0 | 8 |
| 3 | Chris Ryan | (Australia) | Centre | 25 | Western Reds | 25 | 12 | 14 | 0 | 76 |
| 4 | Mat Toshack | (Australia) | Centre | 25 | South Queensland Crushers | 25 | 4 | 0 | 0 | 16 |
| 5 | Martin Offiah | (England) | Wing | 31 | Wigan Warriors | 11 | 7 | 0 | 0 | 28 |
| 6 | Ady Spencer | (England) | Second-row | 25 | London Broncos Academy | 20 | 1 | 0 | 0 | 4 |
| 7 | Glen Air | (Australia) | Scrum-half | 22 | Illawarra Steelers | 19 | 9 | 0 | 0 | 36 |
| 8 | Grant Young | (New Zealand) | Prop | 28 | Auckland Warriors | 26 | 2 | 0 | 0 | 8 |
| 9 | Peter Gill | (Australia) | Loose forward | 33 | Gold Coast Chargers | 27 | 4 | 0 | 0 | 16 |
| 10 | Mark Carroll | (Australia) | Prop | 31 | Manly Sea Eagles | 22 | 1 | 0 | 0 | 4 |
| 11 | Steve Rosolen | (Australia) | Second-row | 31 | Brisbane Norths | 3 | 0 | 0 | 0 | 0 |
| 12 | Steele Retchless | (United States) | Second-row | 27 | South Queensland Crushers | 27 | 1 | 0 | 0 | 4 |
| 13 | Terry Matterson | (Australia) | Loose forward | 31 | Brisbane Broncos | 18 | 4 | 32 | 4 | 84 |
| 14 | Luke Goodwin | (New Zealand) | Wing | 25 | Western Reds | 12 | 3 | 1 | 1 | 15 |
| 15 | Wes Cotton | (England) | Wing | 21 | Wigan Warriors | 12 | 3 | 0 | 0 | 12 |
| 17 | Matt Salter | (England) | Prop | 21 | London Broncos Academy | 19 | 0 | 0 | 0 | 0 |
| 18 | Damien Chapman | (Australia) | Scrum-half | 24 | Western Reds | 11 | 4 | 13 | 2 | 44 |
| 19 | Dom Peters | (Jamaica) | Wing | 19 | London Broncos Academy | 4 | 0 | 0 | 0 | 0 |
| 20 | Matt Dunford | (Australia) | Prop | 30 | Manly Sea Eagles | 25 | 2 | 0 | 0 | 8 |
| 21 | Robert Higgins | (Scotland) | Second-row | 22 | London Broncos Academy | 8 | 2 | 0 | 0 | 8 |
| 22 | John Timu | (New Zealand) | Wing | 29 | Canterbury Bulldogs | 22 | 9 | 0 | 0 | 36 |
| 23 | Giles Thomas | (England) | Scrum-half | 21 | London Broncos Academy | 1 | 0 | 0 | 0 | 0 |
| 24 | Roger Best | (Wales) | Second-row | 24 | Manly Sea Eagles | 7 | 0 | 0 | 0 | 0 |
| 25 | Darren Higgins | (Australia) | Second-row | 33 | Western Reds | 14 | 2 | 0 | 0 | 8 |
| 26 | Robbie Beazley | (Australia) | Hooker | 24 | Illawarra Steelers | 22 | 7 | 0 | 0 | 28 |
| 27 | Rob Smyth | (Ireland) | Wing | 21 | Wigan Warriors | 16 | 5 | 0 | 0 | 20 |
| 28 | Kris Chesney | (England) | Second-row | 22 | Saracens RU | 3 | 0 | 0 | 0 | 0 |
| 29 | Bart Williams | (Australia) | Hooker | 22 | South Sydney Rabbitohs | 8 | 1 | 0 | 0 | 4 |
| 30 | Shane Millard | (United States) | Second-row | 23 | South Sydney Rabbitohs | 9 | 1 | 0 | 0 | 4 |
| 32 | Tulsen Tollett | (England) | Stand-off | 25 | Parramatta Eels | 21 | 2 | 12 | 1 | 33 |
| 33 | Ed Jennings | (Australia) | Stand-off | 19 | Harlequins RU | 1 | 0 | 0 | 0 | 0 |
| 47 | Shaun Edwards | (England) | Scrum-half | 31 | Bradford Bulls | 9 | 4 | 1 | 0 | 18 |
