= 1999 London Broncos season =

- Super League IV Rank: 8th
- Challenge Cup: Final
- 1999 record: Wins: 17; draws: 2; losses: 16
- Points scored: For: 644; against: 708

Team information
- Chairman: Richard Branson
- Coach: Dan Stains (Nov 98-Jun 99); Tony Rea & Les Kiss (Jun 99 - Sep 99); John Monie (Sep 99 - Nov 00)
- Stadium: The Stoop
- Avg. attendance: 2,805
- High attendance: 8,233

Top scorers
- Tries: Greg Fleming - 26
- Goals: Brett Warton - 59
- Points: Brett Warton - 130
Home colours	Away colours
← 1998	List of seasons	2000 →

The 1999 London Broncos season was the twentieth in the club's history and their fourth season in the Super League. The Broncos had three coaches over the course of the season, competing in Super League IV and finishing in 8th place. The club also made their maiden appearance in the final of the Challenge Cup.

== Super League IV table ==
	Team	Pld	W	D	L	PF	PA	PD	Pts	Qualification
1	Bradford Bulls	30	25	1	4	897	445	+452	51	Play-off Semi Final
2	St Helens	30	23	0	7	1034	561	+473	46	Play-off Qualifying Final
3	Leeds Rhinos	30	22	1	7	910	558	+352	45	Play-off Qualifying Final
4	Wigan Warriors	30	21	1	8	877	390	+487	43	Play-off Eliminator Final
5	Castleford Tigers	30	19	3	8	712	451	+261	41	Play-off Eliminator Final
6	Gateshead Thunder	30	19	1	10	775	576	+199	39	
7	Warrington Wolves	30	15	1	14	700	717	-17	31	
8	London Broncos	30	13	2	15	644	708	-64	28	
9	Halifax Blue Sox	30	11	0	19	573	792	-219	22	
10	Sheffield Eagles	30	10	1	19	518	818	-300	21	
11	Wakefield Trinity Wildcats	30	10	0	20	608	795	-187	20	
12	Salford City Reds	30	6	1	23	526	916	-390	13	
13	Hull Sharks	30	5	0	25	422	921	-499	10	
14	Huddersfield Giants	30	5	0	25	463	1011	-548	10	

== 1999 Challenge Cup ==
The London Broncos progressed to the Final of the Cup, before losing to the Leeds Rhinos by 52–16 at the Old Wembley Stadium in London.

Round	Date	Home team	Score	Away team
Fourth round	14 February 1999	London Broncos	64–0	Doncaster
Fifth Round	28 February 1999	Wakefield Trinity Wildcats	8-26	London Broncos
Quarter final	14 March 1999	London Broncos	54–6	Whitehaven
Semi final	28 March 1999	Castleford Tigers	27-33	London Broncos
Final	1 May 1999	Leeds Rhinos	52-16	London Broncos

== 1999 squad statistics ==
Squad Number	Name	International country	Position	Age	Previous club	Appearances	Tries	Goals	Drop Goals	Points
1	Tulsen Tollett	(England)	Stand-off	26	Parramatta Eels	26	10	24	0	88
2	Rob Smyth	(Ireland)	Wing	22	Wigan Warriors	18	5	28	0	76
3	Chris Ryan	(Australia)	Centre	26	Western Reds	31	8	0	0	32
4	Greg Fleming	(Australia)	Centre	24	Canterbury Bulldogs	34	26	1	0	106
5	Martin Offiah	(England)	Wing	32	Wigan Warriors	16	13	0	0	52
6	Karle Hammond	(Wales)	Stand-off	24	St Helens	32	20	2	1	85
7	Shaun Edwards	(England)	Scrum-half	32	Bradford Bulls	15	5	0	0	20
8	Grant Young	(New Zealand)	Prop	29	Auckland Warriors	4	2	0	0	8
9	Peter Gill	(Australia)	Loose forward	34	Gold Coast Chargers	28	5	0	0	20
10	Darren Bradstreet	(Australia)	Prop	24	Illawarra Steelers	3	2	0	0	8
11	Shane Millard	(United States)	Hooker	24	South Sydney Rabbitohs	27	2	1	0	10
12	Steele Retchless	(United States)	Second-row	28	South Queensland Crushers	28	3	0	0	12
13	Mat Toshack	(Australia)	Second-row	26	South Queensland Crushers	30	7	0	0	28
14	Brett Warton	(Australia)	Wing	24	Western Suburbs Magpies	19	3	59	0	130
15	Dean Callaway	(Australia)	Centre	28	Illawarra Steelers	32	7	0	0	28
16	Giles Thomas	(England)	Scrum-half	22	London Broncos Academy	2	0	0	0	0
17	Glen Air	(Australia)	Hooker	23	Illawarra Steelers	23	3	0	1	13
18	Ed Jennings	(England)	Stand-off	20	Harlequins RU	2	0	0	0	0
19	Dom Peters	(Jamaica)	Wing	20	London Broncos Academy	26	5	0	0	20
20	Ady Spencer	(England)	Second-row	26	London Broncos Academy	17	1	0	0	4
21	Wayne Sykes	(England)	Wing	20	London Broncos Academy	2	0	0	0	0
22	John Timu	(New Zealand)	Wing	30	Canterbury Bulldogs	30	6	0	0	24
23	Robbie Simpson	(Australia)	Second-row	24	St. George Dragons	17	1	0	0	4
24	Anthony Seibold	(Australia)	Prop	24	Canberra Raiders	26	4	0	0	16
25	James Brooks	(England)	Stand-off	19	London Broncos Academy	0	0	0	0	0
26	Robbie Beazley	(Australia)	Hooker	25	Illawarra Steelers	28	5	0	1	21
27	Matt Salter	(England)	Prop	22	London Broncos Academy	18	0	0	0	0
28	Steffan Hughes	(Wales)	Second-row	17	London Broncos Academy	8	0	0	0	0
29	Scott Cram	(Scotland)	Prop	22	Illawarra Steelers	15	0	0	0	0
30	Andrew Wynyard	(New Zealand)	Loose forward	26	St. George Illawarra Dragons	20	3	0	0	12
32	David Long	(England)	Prop	??	London Broncos Academy	1	0	0	0	0
