= 2000 London Broncos season =

- Super League V Rank: 11th
- Challenge Cup: Fifth round
- 2000 record: Wins: 7; draws: 0; losses: 23
- Points scored: For: 521; against: 810

Team information
- Chairman: Richard Branson
- Coach: John Monie
- Captain: Karle Hammond
- Stadium: The Valley
- Avg. attendance: 3,354
- High attendance: 8,067

Top scorers
- Tries: Tulsen Tollett - 12
- Goals: Brett Warton - 57
- Points: Brett Warton - 150
Home colours	Away colours
← 1999	List of seasons	2001 →

The 2000 London Broncos season was the twenty-first in the club's history and their fifth season in the Super League. The club was coached by John Monie, competing in Super League V and finishing in 11th place. The club also got to the fifth round of the Challenge Cup.

== Super League V table ==
Super League V
Pos	Team	Pld	W	D	L	PF	PA	PD	Pts	Qualification
1	Wigan Warriors (L)	28	24	1	3	960	405	+555	49	Semi Final
2	St Helens (C)	28	23	0	5	988	627	+361	46	Qualifying Semi Final
3	Bradford Bulls	28	20	3	5	1004	408	+596	43	Qualifying Semi Final
4	Leeds Rhinos	28	17	0	11	692	626	+66	34	Elimination Semi Final
5	Castleford Tigers	28	17	0	11	585	571	+14	34	Elimination Semi Final
6	Warrington Wolves	28	13	0	15	735	817	−82	26	
7	Hull F.C.	28	12	1	15	630	681	−51	25	
8	Halifax Blue Sox	28	11	1	16	664	703	−39	23	
9	Salford City Reds	28	10	0	18	542	910	−368	20	
10	Wakefield Trinity Wildcats	28	8	0	20	557	771	−214	16	
11	London Broncos	28	6	0	22	456	770	−314	12	
12	Huddersfield-Sheffield Giants	28	4	0	24	502	1026	−524	8	

Source: Rugby League Project
Rules for classification: 1) Points; 2) Points difference; 3) Number of points scored;
(C) Champions; (L) League Leaders

== 2000 Challenge Cup ==
The year after reaching their maiden Final, the Broncos were knocked out of the cup at the fifth round stage.

W Win L Loss

Challenge Cup results
Date	Round	Versus	H/A	Venue	Result	Score	Tries	Goals	Attendance	Report
12 February	4	Wath Brow Hornets	H	The Valley	W	44–18	Callaway, Edwards, Hammond, Moore, Retchless, Tollett, Toshack, Wynyard	Tollett (4), Warton (2)	1,511	Report
27 February	5	Salford City Reds	H	The Cherry Red Records Fans' Stadium	L	21–22	Callaway, Fleming, Johnson, Tollett	Tollett (2), Hammond (DG)	1,577	Report

== 2000 squad statistics ==
Squad Number	Name	International country	Position	Age	Previous club	Appearances	Tries	Goals	Drop Goals	Points
1	Tulsen Tollett	(England)	Stand-off	26	Parramatta Eels	24	12	18	0	0
2	Rob Smyth	(Ireland)	Wing	23	Wigan Warriors	3	1	0	0	4
3	Danny Moore	(Australia)	Centre	28	Wigan Warriors	9	1	0	0	4
4	Greg Fleming	(Australia)	Centre	25	Canterbury Bulldogs	19	10	0	0	40
5	Brett Warton	(Australia)	Wing	24	Western Suburbs Magpies	25	9	57	0	150
6	Karle Hammond	(Wales)	Stand-off	25	St Helens	21	8	0	3	35
7	Shaun Edwards	(England)	Scrum-half	33	Bradford Bulls	4	1	0	0	4
8	Darren Bradstreet	(Australia)	Prop	25	Illawarra Steelers	5	0	0	0	0
9	Dean Callaway	(Australia)	Centre	29	Illawarra Steelers	26	6	0	0	24
10	Scott Cram	(Scotland)	Prop	23	Illawarra Steelers	24	1	0	0	4
11	Shane Millard	(Australia)	Hooker	25	South Sydney Rabbitohs	27	2	0	0	8
12	Steele Retchless	(United States)	Second-row	29	South Queensland Crushers	30	3	0	0	12
13	Mat Toshack	(Australia)	Second-row	27	South Queensland Crushers	21	3	0	0	12
14	Andrew Wynyard	(New Zealand)	Loose forward	27	St. George Illawarra Dragons	22	2	0	0	8
15	Andy Johnson	(England)	Second-row	26	Huddersfield Giants	28	8	0	0	32
16	Frank Napoli	(Italy)	Wing	??	Gold Coast Chargers	22	2	0	0	8
17	Anthony Seibold	(Australia)	Prop	25	Canberra Raiders	29	2	0	0	8
18	Justin Dooley	(Australia)	Prop	30	Sydney City Roosters	29	0	0	0	0
19	Dom Peters	(Jamaica)	Wing	21	London Broncos Academy	21	4	0	0	16
20	Steffan Hughes	(Wales)	Second-row	18	London Broncos Academy	2	1	0	0	4
21	Jon Clarke	(England)	Hooker	21	Wigan Warriors	23	1	0	0	4
22	John Timu	(New Zealand)	Wing	31	Canterbury Bulldogs	18	1	0	0	4
23	Steve Barrow	(England)	Prop	24	Wigan Warriors	2	0	0	0	0
25	Brendan Magnus	(Australia)	Loose forward	24	Balmain Tigers	3	1	0	0	4
26	Peter Lupton	(England)	Loose forward	18	London Broncos Academy	17	2	2	0	12
27	Paul Davidson	(England)	Prop	30	St Helens	16	4	0	0	16
28	Kevin Crouthers	(England)	Second-row	24	Wakefield Trinity Wildcats	10	1	0	0	4
29	Glen Air	(Australia)	Hooker	24	Illawarra Steelers	13	5	0	0	20
30	John Roper	(England)	Centre	24	Warrington Wolves	4	0	0	0	0
31	Olu Iwenofu	(England)	Wing	18	London Broncos Academy	2	0	0	0	0
32	Yusef Sozi	(Uganda)	Prop	18	London Broncos Academy	2	0	0	0	0
33	George Truelove	(England)	Centre	24	Bedford RU	5	1	0	0	4
