= 1997 London Broncos season =

- Super League II Rank: 2nd
- Play-off result: Premiership Trophy quarter final
- Challenge Cup: Fifth round
- World Club Championship: Quarter-final
- 1997 record: Wins: 17; draws: 3; losses: 12
- Points scored: For: 692; against: 515

Team information
- Head Coach: Tony Currie
- Stadium: The Stoop
- Avg. attendance: 4,941
- High attendance: 9,166

Top scorers
- Tries: Scott Roskell - 19
- Goals: Greg Barwick - 85
- Points: Greg Barwick - 198
Home colours	Away colours
← 1996	List of seasons	1998 →

The 1997 London Broncos season was the eighteenth in the club's history and their second season in the Super League. Coached by Tony Currie, the Broncos competed in Super League II and finished in 2nd place. The club also reached the fifth round of the 1997 Challenge Cup and the Quarter Finals in the 1997 World Club Championship.

== 1997 squad statistics ==
Squad Number	Name	International country	Position	Age	Previous club	Appearances	Tries	Goals	Drop Goals	Points 1
1	Shaun Edwards	(England)	Scrum-half	30	Wigan Warriors	24	13	0	0	52
2	Mark Maguire	(Australia)	Wing	25	Australia	4	0	1	0	2
3	David Krause	(Australia)	Centre	27	South Queensland Crushers	24	7	0	0	28
4	Paul Smith	(Australia)	Centre	27	Sydney Roosters	10	3	0	0	12
5	Martin Offiah	(England)	Wing	30	Wigan Warriors	17	13	0	0	52
6	Tulsen Tollett	(England)	Stand-off	24	Parramatta Eels	>6	7	1	0	30
7	Josh White	(Australia)	Scrum-half	26	Illawarra Steelers	23	11	0	1	45
8	Matt Dunford	(Australia)	Prop	29	Manly Sea Eagles	25	2	0	1	9
9	Peter Gill	(Australia)	Loose forward	32	Gold Coast Chargers	>7	8	0	0	32
10	Tony Mestrov	(Australia)	Prop	27	South Sydney Rabbitohs	>7	1	0	0	4
11	Steve Rosolen	(Australia)	Second-row	30	Brisbane Norths	>3	5	0	0	20
12	Matt Nable	(Australia)	Second-row	25	Carlisle	4	1	0	0	4
13	Terry Matterson	(Australia)	Loose forward	30	Brisbane Broncos	>7	11	38	2	122
14	Nick Mardon	(Scotland)	Fullback	26	Boroughmuir RU	18	1	0	0	4
15	Ady Spencer	(England)	Second-row	24	London Broncos Academy	18	3	0	0	12
16	Roger Best	(Wales)	Second-row	23	Manly Sea Eagles	4	1	0	0	4
17	Matt Salter	(England)	Prop	20	London Broncos Academy	21	0	0	0	0
18	Mick Seaby	(Australia)	Prop	25	Brisbane Broncos	6	1	0	0	4
19	Andrew Hamilton	(Australia)	Second-row	25	South Queensland Crushers	15	3	0	0	12
20	Greg Barwick	(Australia)	Fullback	29	Balmain Tigers	>5	7	85	0	198
21	Giles Thomas	(England)	Scrum-half	20	London Broncos Academy	1	0	0	0	0
22	Scott Roskell	(Australia)	Wing	28	Runaway Bay	>7	19	0	0	76
24	Russell Bawden	(Australia)	Prop	24	Brisbane Broncos	>7	5	0	0	20
25	Paul Terry	(Australia)	Prop	20	Australia	1	0	0	0	0
26	Robbie Beazley	(Australia)	Hooker	23	Illawarra Steelers	31	7	0	0	28
27	Andrew Duncan	(Scotland)	Second-row	25	Warrington Wolves	8	3	0	0	12
29	Kim Howard	(Australia)	Prop	27	Australia	14	1	0	0	4
31	Tony Martin	(Australia)	Centre	18	London Broncos Academy	25	8	1	0	34
33	Abraham Fatnowna	(Australia)	Wing	23	Workington Town	7	3	0	0	12
34	Wes Cotton	(England)	Wing	20	Wigan Warriors	2	2	0	0	8
35	Kerrod Toby	(Australia)	Second-row	18	London Broncos Academy	6	0	0	0	0

== Super League II table ==
Pos	Team	Pld	W	D	L	PF	PA	PD	Pts	Relegation
1	Bradford Bulls (C)	22	20	0	2	769	397	+372	40	
2	London Broncos	22	15	3	4	616	418	+198	33	
3	St Helens	22	14	1	7	592	506	+86	29	
4	Wigan	22	14	0	8	683	398	+285	28	
5	Leeds Rhinos	22	13	1	8	544	463	+81	27	
6	Salford Reds	22	11	0	11	428	495	−67	22	
7	Halifax Blue Sox	22	8	2	12	524	549	−25	18	
8	Sheffield Eagles	22	9	0	13	415	574	−159	18	
9	Warrington Wolves	22	8	0	14	437	647	−210	16	
10	Castleford Tigers	22	5	2	15	334	515	−181	12	
11	Paris Saint-Germain	22	6	0	16	362	572	−210	12	
12	Oldham Bears (R)	22	4	1	17	461	631	−170	9	Relegated to Division One

Source: Rugby League Project
Rules for classification: 1) Points; 2) Points difference; 3) Number of points scored;
(C) Champions; (R) Relegated

== 1997 Challenge Cup ==
The London Broncos progressed to the fifth round of the Cup, before losing to the Bradford Bulls at The Stoop.

Round	Date	Home team	Score	Away team	Attendance
Fourth round	9 February 1997	Lancashire Lynx	5–48	London Broncos	713
Fifth Round	22 February 1997	London Broncos	12–34	Bradford Bulls	6,102

== 1997 World Club Championship ==
=== Super League ===
Pool A

Club	Played	Won	Lost	Drawn	For	Against	Diff.	Points
Wigan Warriors	6	2	4	0	89	212	-123	4
London Broncos	6	1	5	0	136	238	-102	2
Bradford Bulls	6	0	6	0	82	228	-146	0
St Helens	6	0	6	0	96	270	-174	0
Warrington Wolves	6	0	6	0	78	256	-178	0
Halifax Blue Sox	6	0	6	0	56	340	-284	0

== WCC matches ==
=== Round 1 ===
6 June 1997
Brisbane Broncos	42 – 22	London Broncos	ANZ Stadium, Brisbane	Attendance: 18,193

=== Round 2 ===
15 June 1997
Canberra Raiders	66 – 20	London Broncos	Bruce Stadium, Canberra	Attendance: 6,471

=== Round 3 ===
22 June 1997
Canterbury Bulldogs	34 – 18	London Broncos	Belmore Sports Ground, Sydney	Attendance: 4,000

=== Round 4 ===
21 July 1997
London Broncos	38 – 18	Canberra Raiders	The Stoop, London	Attendance: 7,819

=== Round 5 ===
27 July 1997
London Broncos	16 – 34	Brisbane Broncos	The Stoop, London	Attendance: 9,846

=== Round 6 ===
1 August 1997
London Broncos	22 – 44	Canterbury Bulldogs	The Stoop, London	Attendance: 6,923

=== Quarter-finals ===
6 October 1997
London Broncos	16 – 40	Cronulla Sharks	The Stoop, London	Attendance: 6,239
