= 2001 London Broncos season =

- Super League VI Rank: 6th
- Challenge Cup: Fifth round
- 2001 record: Wins: 14; draws: 1; losses: 15
- Points scored: For: 708; against: 639

Team information
- Chairman: Richard Branson
- Coach: Tony Rea
- Captain: Jason Hetherington
- Stadium: The Valley
- Avg. attendance: 3,205
- High attendance: 5,259

Top scorers
- Tries: Nigel Roy - 12
- Goals: Tony Martin - 50
- Points: Tony Martin - 132
Home colours	Away colours
← 2000	List of seasons	2002 →

The 2001 London Broncos season was the twenty-second in the club's history and their sixth season in the Super League. The club was coached by Tony Rea, competing in Super League VI and finishing in 6th place. The club also got to the fifth round of the Challenge Cup.

== Super League VI table ==
Pos	Team	Pld	W	D	L	PF	PA	PD	Pts	Qualification
1	Bradford Bulls (L, C)	28	22	1	5	1120	474	+646	45	Semi Final
2	Wigan Warriors	28	22	1	5	989	494	+495	45	Qualifying play-off
3	Hull F.C.	28	20	2	6	772	630	+142	42	Qualifying play-off
4	St Helens	28	17	2	9	924	732	+192	36	Elimination play-off
5	Leeds Rhinos	28	16	1	11	774	721	+53	33	Elimination play-off
6	London Broncos	28	13	1	14	644	603	+41	27	
7	Warrington Wolves	28	11	2	15	646	860	−214	24	
8	Castleford Tigers	28	10	1	17	581	777	−196	21	
9	Halifax Blue Sox	28	9	0	19	630	819	−189	18	
10	Salford City Reds	28	8	0	20	587	956	−369	16	
11	Wakefield Trinity Wildcats	28	8	0	20	529	817	−288	14 (Note: Wakefield deducted 2 points for salary cap breaches.)	
12	Huddersfield Giants (R)	28	6	1	21	613	926	−313	13	Relegation to Northern Ford Premiership

Source: Rugby League Project
Rules for classification: 1) Points; 2) Points difference; 3) Number of points scored;
(C) Champions; (L) League Leaders; (R) Relegated

== Challenge Cup ==
For the second consecutive year, the Broncos were knocked out of the cup at the fifth round stage.

Home	Score	Away	Match Information
Home	Score	Away	Date and Time	Venue	Referee	Attendance
London Broncos	44-6	Batley Bulldogs	11 February 2001	Broadfield Stadium	Steve Addy	1,204
Hull F.C.	30-20	London Broncos	25 February 2001	The Boulevard	Stuart Cummings	6,701

== 2001 London Broncos squad ==
Squad Number	Name	International country	Position	Age	Previous club	Appearances	Tries	Goals	Drop Goals	Points
1	Tulsen Tollett	(England)	Stand-off	28	Parramatta Eels	9	1	0	0	4
2	Nigel Roy	(Australia)	Centre	27	Northern Eagles	30	12	0	0	48
3	Tony Martin	(Australia)	Centre	22	Melbourne Storm	22	8	50	0	132
4	Greg Fleming	(Australia)	Centre	26	Canterbury Bulldogs	19	8	1	0	34
5	Brett Warton	(Australia)	Wing	26	Western Suburbs Magpies	19	2	37	0	84
6	Jim Dymock	(Australia)	Loose forward	29	Parramatta Eels	28	7	0	0	28
7	Dennis Moran	(Australia)	Scrum-half	24	Parramatta Eels	29	11	0	3	47
8	Tony Mestrov	(Australia)	Prop	31	Wigan Warriors	25	0	0	0	0
9	Jason Hetherington	(Australia)	Hooker	27	Canterbury Bulldogs	19	3	0	0	12
10	Scott Cram	(Scotland)	Prop	24	Illawarra Steelers	25	3	0	0	12
11	Shane Millard	(United States)	Second-row	26	South Sydney Rabbitohs	29	7	0	0	28
12	Steele Retchless	(United States)	Second-row	30	South Queensland Crushers	30	2	0	0	8
13	Mat Toshack	(Australia)	Second-row	28	South Queensland Crushers	24	7	0	0	28
14	Olu Iwenofu	(England)	Wing	19	London Broncos Academy	3	0	0	0	0
15	Andy Johnson	(England)	Second-row	27	Huddersfield-Sheffield Giants	19	5	0	0	20
16	Darrell Griffin	(England)	Prop	19	London Broncos Academy	0	0	0	0	0
17	Glen Air	(Australia)	Hooker	25	Illawarra Steelers	18	10	0	0	40
18	Justin Dooley	(Australia)	Prop	31	Sydney Roosters	30	2	0	0	8
19	Dom Peters	(England)	Wing	22	London Broncos Academy	6	0	0	0	0
20	Steffan Hughes	(Wales)	Second-row	19	London Broncos Academy	8	0	0	0	0
21	Jon Clarke	(England)	Hooker	22	Wigan Warriors	10	1	0	0	4
22	Yusef Sozi	(Uganda)	Prop	19	London Broncos Academy	5	0	0	0	0
23	Richie Barnett	(New Zealand)	Centre	29	Sydney Roosters	18	10	0	0	40
24	Gareth Honor	(England)	Hooker	19	London Broncos Academy	0	0	0	0	0
25	Michael Forbes	(England)	Wing	??	London Broncos Academy	0	0	0	0	0
26	Peter Lupton	(England)	Loose forward	19	London Broncos Academy	8	0	0	0	0
27	Michael Gillett	(Australia)	Stand-off	28	Wests Tigers	21	8	2	0	36
28	Marvin Golden	(England)	Centre	24	Halifax	21	3	0	0	12
--	Sylvain Houles	(France)	Centre	20	Huddersfield-Sheffield Giants	9	6	0	0	24
--	Rob Parker	(England)	Second-row	20	Bradford Bulls	9	1	0	0	4
--	Dan Potter	(England)	Centre	22	Dewsbury Rams	6	1	0	0	4
--	Iain Morrison	(Scotland)	Prop	18	London Broncos Academy	1	0	0	0	0
--	Paul Sykes	(England)	Fullback	20	Bradford Bulls	9	1	23	1	51
--	Kris Smith	(England)	Second-row	??	Halifax	1	0	0	0	0
