= 1999 Challenge Cup =

Rugby league competition

1999 Silk Cut Challenge Cup
- Duration: 8 Rounds
- Highest attendance: 73,242
- Broadcast partners: (United Kingdom) BBC Sport
- Winners: Leeds Rhinos
- Runners-up: London Broncos
- Lance Todd Trophy: Leroy Rivett

The 1999 Challenge Cup, known as the Silk Cut Challenge Cup for sponsorship reasons, was the 98th staging of the Challenge Cup, a European rugby league cup competition. The competition ended with the final on 1 May 1999, which was played at Wembley Stadium, and was the last year the cup final was played there before the stadium was closed for redevelopment.

The tournament was won by Leeds Rhinos, who beat London Broncos 52–16 in the final, and was the club's first major silverware since 1978. The Lance Todd Trophy was won by Leroy Rivett, who had become the first player to score four tries in a Challenge Cup final.

== First round ==
Date	Team one	Team two	Score
05 Dec	Barrow Is.	Uni of Wales Inst	24-4
05 Dec	Dewsbury Moor	Ellenborough	6-40
05 Dec	Dudley Hill	Leeds Uni	66-0
05 Dec	Eastmoor	Moldgreen	24-34
05 Dec	Eccles	Garibaldi	78-10
05 Dec	Featherstone Lions	Queensbury	34-26
05 Dec	Hull Dockers	Park Amateurs	23-6
05 Dec	Ideal Isberg	Millom	39-4
05 Dec	Keighley Albion	Dodworth	6-42
05 Dec	Leigh East	Haydock	12-18
05 Dec	London Skolars	Thatto Heath	16-4
05 Dec	Middleton	Wigan St Judes	12-15
05 Dec	New Earswick	Townville	14-16
05 Dec	Norland	Milford	28-22
05 Dec	Oulton	York Acorn	42-8
05 Dec	Queens	Redhill	20-18
05 Dec	Shaw Cross	Featherstone MW	12-16
05 Dec	Siddal	Northside Saints	90-10
05 Dec	Wigan Rose Bridge	Blackbrook	23-16
12 Dec	Clayton	Normanton	10-28
12 Dec	Gateshead P	Crosfields	10-58
12 Dec	Ovenden	East Leeds	22-14
13 Dec	Rochdale Mayfield	Leeds Met University	36-18
13 Dec	Scottish Eagles	Wath Brow Hornets	10-34

== Second round ==
Date	Team one	Team two	Score
19 Dec	Askam	Heworth	25-22
19 Dec	Beverley E Hull	Townville	12-28
19 Dec	Dodworth	Cas. Lock Lane	12-24
19 Dec	Dudley Hill	Wigan St Pats	29-8
19 Dec	Eccles	Normanton	27-16
19 Dec	Moldgreen	Oulton	21-18
19 Dec	Norland	Crosfields	39-0
19 Dec	Oldham St Annes	Ellenborough	34-6
19 Dec	Queens	West Hull	28-40
19 Dec	Rochdale Mayfield	Hull Dockers	28-10
19 Dec	Saddleworth	Walney	10-6
19 Dec	Siddal	Featherstone MW	27-7
19 Dec	Skirlaugh	Ideal Isberg	8-2
19 Dec	Thornhill	Barrow Is.	25-12
19 Dec	Wath Brow Hornets	London Skolars	16-6
19 Dec	Wigan Rose Bridge	Leigh Miners R.	6-17
19 Dec	Wigan St Judes	Woolston	32-8
02 Jan	Egremont	Haydock	21-0
02 Jan	Featherstone Lions	Ovenden	37-18

== Third round ==
Date	Team one	Team two	Score
31 Jan	Barrow	Dudley Hill	44-16
31 Jan	Batley	Cas. Lock Lane	40-10
31 Jan	Bramley	Leigh Miners R.	12-18
31 Jan	Dewsbury	Siddal	38-10
31 Jan	Doncaster	Oldham St Annes	35-24
31 Jan	Featherstone Rovers	Thornhill	70-6
31 Jan	Hemel	Featherstone Lions	8-29
31 Jan	Hull Kingston Rovers	Wath Brow Hornets	56-4
31 Jan	Hunslet Hawks	Townville	66-6
31 Jan	Keighley	Rochdale Mayfield	48-2
31 Jan	Lancashire Lynx	Askam	50-3
31 Jan	Leigh	Norland	42-6
31 Jan	Rochdale Hornets	Wigan St Judes	52-12
31 Jan	Swinton	Moldgreen	38-4
31 Jan	Whitehaven	Saddleworth	22-6
31 Jan	Widnes	West Hull	34-4
31 Jan	Workington Town	Skirlaugh	30-4
31 Jan	York	Egremont	57-2
01 Feb	Oldham	Eccles	26-7

== Fourth round ==
Date	Team one	Team two	Score
12 Feb	Wakefield Trinity	Batley	12-2
13 Feb	Featherstone Lions	Halifax	6-74
13 Feb	Leigh Miners R.	Hull Kingston Rovers	0-52
13 Feb	Salford City	Sheffield Eagles	16-6
14 Feb	Barrow	Leigh	16-33
14 Feb	Bradford	Workington Town	92-0
14 Feb	Castleford Tigers	Hull	36-22
14 Feb	Huddersfield	Swinton	78-4
14 Feb	Hunslet Hawks	St Helens	10-40
14 Feb	Leeds	Wigan	28-18
14 Feb	London	Doncaster	64-0
14 Feb	Rochdale Hornets	York	19-22
14 Feb	Warrington	Featherstone Rovers	50-6
14 Feb	Whitehaven	Lancashire	24-6
14 Feb	Widnes	Keighley	28-20
15 Feb	Oldham	Dewsbury	18-10

== Fifth round ==
Date	Team one	Team two	Score
26 Feb	Castleford Tigers	York Wasps	28-2
27 Feb	Leeds Rhinos	St Helens Saints	24-16
28 Feb	Whitehaven Warriors	Oldham Bears	18-2
28 Feb	Huddersfield Giants	Salford City Reds	14-22
28 Feb	Widnes Vikings	Leigh Centurions	20-17
28 Feb	Wakefield Trinity Wildcats	Bradford Bulls	8-26
28 Feb	Hull Kingston Rovers	London Broncos	0-6
28 Feb	Warrington Wolves	Halifax Blue Sox	34-4

== Quarter-finals ==
Date	Team one	Team two	Score
13 Mar	Castleford Tigers	Salford City Reds	30-10
14 Mar	Bradford Bulls	Warrington Wolves	52-16
14 Mar	London Broncos	Whitehaven Warriors	54-6
14 Mar	Widnes Vikings	Leeds Rhinos	10-46

== Semi-finals ==
Date	Team one	Team two	Score
27 Mar	Bradford Bulls	Leeds Rhinos	10-23
28 Mar	Castleford Tigers	London Broncos	27-33

== Final ==
1 May 1999

Leeds Rhinos	52 – 16	London Broncos
Tries: Rivett (4), Godden, McDermott, St Hilaire, Harris, Cummins; Goals: Harris (8)	Report	Tries: Offiah, Simpson, Fleming; Goals: Smyth (2)

Wembley Stadium, London
Attendance: 73,242
Player of the Match: Leroy Rivett

Leeds Rhinos : 1 Iestyn Harris 2 Leroy Rivett 3 Richie Blackmore 4 Brad Godden 5 Francis Cummins 6 Daryl Powell 7 Ryan Sheridan 8 Barrie McDermott 9 Terry Newton 10 Darren Fleary 11 Adrian Morley 12 Anthony Farrell 13 Marc Glanville 14 Marcus St Hilaire 15 Lee Jackson 16 Andy Hay 17 Jamie Mathiou Coach: Graham Murray

London Broncos: 1 Tulsen Tollett 2 Rob Smyth 3 John Timu 4 Greg Fleming 5 Martin Offiah 6 Karle Hammond 7 Shaun Edwards 8 Steele Retchless 9 Robbie Beazley 10 Matt Salter 11 Shane Millard 12 Robbie Simpson 13 Peter Gill 14 Mat Toshack 15 Glen Air 16 Dean Callaway 17 Chris Ryan Coach: Dan Stains
