= 2004 London Broncos season =

- Super League IX Rank: 10th
- Challenge Cup: Fifth round
- 2004 record: Wins: 8; draws: 1; losses: 22
- Points scored: For: 595; against: 1005

Team information
- Chairman: David Hughes
- Coach: Tony Rea
- Captain: Jim Dymock
- Stadium: Griffin Park
- Avg. attendance: 3,346
- High attendance: 5,058

Top scorers
- Tries: Dennis Moran - 19
- Goals: Paul Sykes - 68
- Points: Paul Sykes - 160
Home colours	Away colours
← 2003	List of seasons	2005 →

The 2004 London Broncos season was the twenty-fifth in the club's history and their ninth season in the Super League. The club was coached by Tony Rea, competing in Super League IX and finishing in 10th place. The club also got to the fifth round of the Challenge Cup.

== Super League table IX ==
Super League IX
Pos.	Team	Pld	W	D	L	PF	PA	PD	Pts	Qual.
1	Leeds Rhinos	28	24	2	2	1037	443	+594	50	Play-off semi-final
2	Bradford Bulls	28	20	1	7	918	565	+353	41	Play-off semi-final
3	Hull	28	19	2	7	843	478	+365	40	Play-off elimination final
4	Wigan Warriors	28	17	4	7	736	558	+178	38	Play-off elimination final
5	St. Helens	28	17	1	10	821	662	+159	35	Play-off elimination final
6	Wakefield Trinity Wildcats	28	15	0	13	788	662	+126	30	Play-off elimination final
7	Huddersfield Giants	28	12	0	16	518	757	−239	24	
8	Warrington Wolves	28	10	1	17	700	715	−15	21	
9	Salford City Reds	28	8	0	20	507	828	−321	16	
10	London Broncos	28	7	1	20	561	968	−407	15	
11	Widnes Vikings	28	7	0	21	466	850	−384	14	
12	Castleford Tigers	28	6	0	22	515	924	−409	12	Relegated to National League 1

Source: Rugby League Project.
Classification: 1st on competition points; 2nd on match points difference.
Competition points: for win = 2; for draw = 1; for loss = 0.

== 2004 Challenge Cup ==
For the fifth consecutive year, the Broncos were knocked out of the cup at the fifth round stage.

Round	Home	Score	Away	Match Information
Round	Home	Score	Away	Date and Time	Venue	Attendance
Fourth round	London Broncos	24-8	Salford City Reds	29 February 2004	Griffin Park	2,454
Fifth round	Wakefield Trinity Wildcats	10-29	London Broncos	14 March 2004	Griffin Park	2,654

== 2004 London Broncos squad ==
Squad Number	Name	International country	Position	Age	Previous club	Appearances	Tries	Goals	Drop Goals	Points
1	Paul Sykes	(England)	Fullback	23	Bradford Bulls	27	7	68	0	160
2	Jon Wells	(England)	Wing	26	Wakefield Trinity Wildcats	22	8	0	0	32
3	Nigel Roy	(Australia)	Centre	30	Northern Eagles	21	9	0	0	36
4	Mark O'Halloran	(United States)	Centre	23	Wests Tigers	24	8	0	0	32
5	John Kirkpatrick	(England)	Wing	25	Halifax	15	3	0	0	12
6	Rob Purdham	(England)	Loose forward	25	Whitehaven	10	4	0	0	16
7	Dennis Moran	(Australia)	Scrum-half	27	Parramatta Eels	30	19	1	0	78
8	Francis Stephenson	(England)	Prop	28	Wigan Warriors	16	0	0	0	0
9	Neil Budworth	(Wales)	Hooker	22	Wigan Warriors	29	2	1	0	10
10	Steve Trindall	(Australia)	Prop	31	Wests Tigers	30	1	0	0	4
11	Mat Toshack	(Tonga)	Second-row	31	South Queensland Crushers	4	0	0	0	0
12	Steele Retchless	(United States)	Second-row	33	South Queensland Crushers	27	3	0	0	12
13	Jim Dymock	(Australia)	Loose forward	32	Parramatta Eels	19	2	0	1	9
14	Andrew Brocklehurst	(England)	Second-row	21	Halifax	20	2	0	0	8
15	Mitch Stringer	(Scotland)	Prop	21	London Broncos Academy	29	0	0	0	0
16	Joe Mbu	(Zaire)	Second-row	21	London Broncos Academy	21	4	0	0	16
17	Tommy Haughey	(Ireland)	Second-row	22	Wakefield Trinity Wildcats	15	1	0	0	4
18	Andrew Hart	(Australia)	Second-row	25	South Sydney Rabbitohs	15	3	0	0	12
19	Dave Highton	(Wales)	Hooker	25	Salford City Reds	23	1	0	0	4
20	Radney Bowker	(England)	Stand-off	25	Salford City Reds	5	1	0	0	4
21	Rob Jackson	(Australia)	Centre	23	Wigan Warriors	15	4	0	0	16
22	Lee Sanderson	(England)	Scrum-half	20	Leigh Centurions	7	1	7	0	18
23	Lee Greenwood	(England)	Wing	24	Halifax	26	17	0	0	68
24	Andy McNally	(England)	Fullback	22	Featherstone Rovers	9	0	0	0	0
25	Scott Murrell	(England)	Stand-off	19	Leeds Rhinos	6	2	0	0	8
26	Johnny Williams	(England)	Wing	19	London Broncos Academy	4	0	0	0	0
27	Dwayne Barker	(England)	Second-row	19	Leeds Rhinos	3	1	0	0	4
28	Jason Netherton	(England)	Second-row	21	Halifax	3	0	0	0	0
29	Steve Thomas	(Wales)	Centre	23	Warrington Wolves	6	0	0	0	0
30	Liam Botham	(England)	Second-row	21	Leeds Rhinos	8	3	6	0	24
31	Richard Moore	(England)	Prop	23	Bradford Bulls	7	0	0	0	0
32	Russell Bawden	(Australia)	Prop	31	Brisbane Broncos	2	0	0	0	0
33	Paul Sampson	(England)	Wing	27	Wakefield Trinity Wildcats	3	1	0	0	4
34	Zeb Luisi	(Niue)	Fullback	19	London Broncos Academy	4	1	0	0	4
35	Mal Kaufusi	(Tonga)	Wing	25	Northern Eagles	4	0	0	0	0
36	Ade Adebisi	(Nigeria)	Wing	18	London Broncos Academy	1	0	0	0	0
