= 2003 London Broncos season =

- Super League VIII Rank: 5th
- Play-off result: Eliminated Week 1
- Challenge Cup: Fifth round
- 2003 record: Wins: 15; draws: 2; losses: 14
- Points scored: For: 697; against: 729

Team information
- Chairman: David Hughes
- Coach: Tony Rea
- Captain: Jim Dymock
- Stadium: Griffin Park
- Avg. attendance: 3,383
- High attendance: 5,666

Top scorers
- Tries: Dennis Moran - 24
- Goals: Chris Thorman - 81
- Points: Chris Thorman - 195
Home colours	Away colours
← 2002	List of seasons	2004 →

The 2003 London Broncos season was the twenty-fourth in the club's history and their eighth season in the Super League. The club was coached by Tony Rea, competing in Super League VIII and finishing in 5th place. The club also got to the fifth round of the Challenge Cup.

== Super League VIII table ==
Pos	Team	Pld	W	D	L	PF	PA	PD	Pts	Qualification
1	Bradford Bulls (L, C)	28	22	0	6	878	529	+349	44	Semi-final
2	Leeds Rhinos	28	19	3	6	751	555	+196	41	Semi-final
3	Wigan Warriors	28	19	2	7	776	512	+264	40	Elimination play-offs
4	St Helens	28	16	1	11	845	535	+310	31 (Note: St Helens deducted 2 points for salary cap breaches.)	Elimination play-offs
5	London Broncos	28	14	2	12	643	696	−53	30	Elimination play-offs
6	Warrington Wolves	28	14	1	13	748	619	+129	29	Elimination play-offs
7	Hull F.C.	28	13	3	12	701	577	+124	27 (Note: Hull F.C. deducted 2 points for salary cap breaches.)	
8	Castleford Tigers	28	12	1	15	612	633	−21	25	
9	Widnes Vikings	28	12	1	15	640	727	−87	25	
10	Huddersfield Giants	28	11	1	16	628	715	−87	23	
11	Wakefield Trinity Wildcats	28	7	1	20	505	774	−269	15	
12	Halifax (R)	28	1	0	27	372	1227	−855	0 (Note: Halifax deducted 2 points for salary cap breaches.)	Relegation to National League One

Source: Rugby League Project
Rules for classification: 1) Points; 2) Points difference; 3) Number of points scored;
(C) Champions; (L) League Leaders' Shield Winners; (R) Relegated

== Play-offs ==
Elimination play-offs
3	Wigan Warriors	25
6	Warrington Wolves	12
4	St Helens	24
5	London Broncos	6

Qualifying/Elimination semifinal
1	Bradford Bulls	30
2	Leeds Rhinos	14
Wigan Warriors	40
St Helens	24

Elimination final
Leeds Rhinos	22
Wigan Warriors	23

Grand Final
Bradford Bulls	25
Wigan Warriors	12

== 2003 Challenge Cup ==
For the fourth consecutive year, the Broncos were knocked out of the cup at the fifth round stage.

Round	Home	Score	Away	Match Information
Round	Home	Score	Away	Date and Time	Venue	Attendance
Fourth round	London Broncos	42-12	Oldham	9 February 2003	Griffin Park	1514
Fifth round	Leeds Rhinos	21-12	London Broncos	1 March 2003	Headingley	12,901

== 2003 London Broncos squad ==
Squad Number	Name	International country	Position	Age	Previous club	Appearances	Tries	Goals	Drop Goals	Points
1	Paul Sykes	(England)	Fullback	22	Bradford Bulls	17	6	1	0	26
2	Dom Peters	(England)	Wing	24	London Broncos Academy	3	2	0	0	8
3	Nigel Roy	(Australia)	Centre	29	Northern Eagles	30	9	0	0	36
4	Tony Martin	(Australia)	Centre	24	Melbourne Storm	27	14	34	0	124
5	Steve Hall	(England)	Wing	24	St Helens	21	6	0	0	24
6	Rob Purdham	(England)	Stand-off	24	Whitehaven	27	1	0	0	4
7	Dennis Moran	(Australia)	Scrum-half	26	Parramatta Eels	27	24	0	0	96
8	Francis Stephenson	(England)	Prop	27	Wigan Warriors	29	2	0	0	8
9	Bill Peden	(Australia)	Hooker	33	Newcastle Knights	25	8	0	0	32
10	Richard Marshall	(Ireland)	Prop	27	Huddersfield Giants	18	0	0	0	0
11	Mat Toshack	(Australia)	Second-row	30	South Queensland Crushers	21	1	0	0	4
12	Steele Retchless	(United States)	Second-row	32	South Queensland Crushers	31	2	0	0	8
13	Jim Dymock	(Australia)	Loose forward	31	Parramatta Eels	29	4	0	0	16
14	Neil Budworth	(Wales)	Hooker	21	Wigan Warriors	30	1	0	0	4
15	Mark Cox	(England)	Prop	25	Whitehaven	4	0	0	0	0
16	Jamie Fielden	(England)	Prop	25	Doncaster	2	0	0	0	0
17	Tommy Haughey	(Ireland)	Second-row	21	Wakefield Trinity Wildcats	6	0	0	0	0
18	Austin Buchanan	(England)	Wing	19	Leeds Rhinos	4	2	0	0	8
19	Nick Johnson	(England)	Hooker	??	Bradford Bulls	3	0	0	0	0
20	Jason Hetherington	(Australia)	Hooker	29	Canterbury Bulldogs	0	0	0	0	0
21	Rob Jackson	(England)	Centre	22	Wigan Warriors	19	4	0	0	16
22	Andrew Hamilton	(Australia)	Second-row	31	Ipswich Jets	15	0	0	0	0
23	Chris Thorman	(England)	Stand-off	24	Huddersfield Giants	29	8	81	1	195
24	Russell Bawden	(Australia)	Prop	30	Brisbane Broncos	31	1	0	0	4
25	Andrew King	(Australia)	Centre	22	South Sydney Rabbitohs	24	15	2	0	64
26	Damian Kennedy	(Australia)	Centre	29	Canberra Raiders	16	1	0	0	4
28	Karl Long	(England)	Centre	22	Widnes Vikings	1	0	0	0	0
29	Tommy Gallagher	(Ireland)	Second-row	20	Leeds Rhinos	10	1	0	0	4
30	Jason Netherton	(England)	Second-row	20	Leeds Rhinos	3	0	0	0	0
31	Joe Mbu	(Zaire)	Second-row	19	London Broncos Academy	8	0	0	0	0
32	Steve Trindall	(Australia)	Prop	30	Wests Tigers	7	0	0	0	0
33	Joel Caine	(Australia)	Wing	25	Wests Tigers	6	4	1	0	18
34	Dave McConnell	(Scotland)	Hooker	22	Chorley Lynx	4	0	0	0	0
