= 2002 London Broncos season =

- Super League VII Rank: 8th
- Challenge Cup: Fifth round
- 2002 record: Wins: 14; draws: 1; losses: 15
- Points scored: For: 693; against: 660

Team information
- Chairman: David Hughes
- Coach: Tony Rea
- Captain: Jason Hetherington & Richie Barnett
- Stadium: Griffin Park
- Avg. attendance: 3,763
- High attendance: 5,540

Top scorers
- Tries: Dennis Moran - 23
- Goals: Tony Martin - 95
- Points: Tony Martin - 226
Home colours	Away colours
← 2001	List of seasons	2003 →

The 2002 London Broncos season was the twenty-third in the club's history and their seventh season in the Super League. The club was coached by Tony Rea, competing in Super League VII and finishing in 8th place. The club also got to the fifth round of the Challenge Cup.

== Super League VII table ==
Pos	Team	Pld	W	D	L	PF	PA	PD	Pts	Qualification
1	St Helens (L, C)	28	23	0	5	927	522	+405	46	Semi-final
2	Bradford Bulls	28	23	0	5	910	519	+391	46	Semi-final
3	Wigan Warriors	28	19	1	8	817	475	+342	39	Elimination play-offs
4	Leeds Rhinos	28	17	0	11	865	700	+165	34	Elimination play-offs
5	Hull F.C.	28	16	0	12	742	674	+68	32	Elimination play-offs
6	Castleford Tigers	28	14	2	12	736	615	+121	30	Elimination play-offs
7	Widnes Vikings	28	14	1	13	590	716	−126	29	
8	London Broncos	28	13	1	14	661	635	+26	27	
9	Halifax Blue Sox	28	8	0	20	558	856	−298	16	
10	Warrington Wolves	28	7	0	21	483	878	−395	14	
11	Wakefield Trinity Wildcats	28	5	2	21	566	899	−333	12	
12	Salford City Reds (R)	28	5	1	22	490	856	−366	11	Relegation to National League One

Source: Rugby League Project
Rules for classification: 1) Points; 2) Points difference; 3) Number of points scored;
(C) Champions; (L) League Leaders' Shield Winners; (R) Relegated

== 2002 Challenge Cup ==
For the third consecutive year, the Broncos were knocked out of the cup at the fifth round stage.

Round	Home	Score	Away	Match Information
Round	Home	Score	Away	Date and Time	Venue	Attendance
Fourth round	Batley Bulldogs	6-26	London Broncos	10 February 2002	Mount Pleasant	769
Fifth round	London Broncos	6-19	Castleford Tigers	24 February 2002	Griffin Park	2,436

== 2002 London Broncos squad ==
Squad Number	Name	International country	Position	Age	Previous club	Appearances	Tries	Goals	Drop Goals	Points
1	Michael Gillett	(Australia)	Stand-off	29	Wests Tigers	27	7	0	0	28
2	Nigel Roy	(Australia)	Centre	28	Northern Eagles	27	13	0	0	52
3	Tony Martin	(Australia)	Centre	23	Melbourne Storm	30	9	95	0	226
4	Sylvain Houles	(France)	Centre	21	Huddersfield-Sheffield Giants	20	6	0	0	24
5	Steve Hall	(England)	Wing	23	St Helens	21	6	0	0	24
6	Jim Dymock	(Australia)	Loose forward	30	Parramatta Eels	27	4	0	0	16
7	Dennis Moran	(Australia)	Scrum-half	25	Parramatta Eels	29	23	1	2	96
8	Francis Stephenson	(England)	Prop	26	Wigan Warriors	22	3	0	0	12
9	Jason Hetherington	(Australia)	Hooker	28	Canterbury Bulldogs	21	6	0	0	24
10	Scott Cram	(Scotland)	Prop	25	Illawarra Steelers	14	1	0	0	4
11	Wayne Evans	(Australia)	Second-row	27	Northern Eagles	19	2	0	0	8
12	Steele Retchless	(United States)	Second-row	31	South Queensland Crushers	28	3	0	0	12
13	Mat Toshack	(Australia)	Second-row	29	South Queensland Crushers	30	9	0	0	36
14	Richard Marshall	(Ireland)	Prop	26	Huddersfield Giants	30	1	0	0	4
17	Neil Budworth	(Wales)	Hooker	20	Wigan Warriors	12	1	0	0	4
18	Peter Lupton	(England)	Loose forward	20	London Broncos Academy	2	0	0	0	0
19	Dom Peters	(England)	Wing	23	London Broncos Academy	16	2	0	0	8
20	Rob Purdham	(England)	Stand-off	22	Whitehaven	15	1	1	1	7
21	Rob Jackson	(England)	Centre	21	Wigan Warriors	10	3	0	0	12
23	Richie Barnett	(New Zealand)	Centre	30	Sydney Roosters	20	3	0	0	12
24	Russell Bawden	(Australia)	Prop	29	Brisbane Broncos	29	7	0	0	28
25	Richard Moore	(England)	Prop	21	Bradford Bulls	7	2	0	0	8
26	Alex Wilkinson	(Australia)	Centre	19	Bradford Bulls	6	0	0	0	0
27	Jonny Hepworth	(England)	Scrum-half	19	London Broncos Academy	2	0	0	0	0
28	Darren Shaw	(Scotland)	Second-row	30	Salford City Reds	9	0	0	0	0
29	Gareth Price	(Wales)	Prop	22	Leigh Centurions	4	3	0	0	12
30	Paul Sykes	(England)	Fullback	21	Bradford Bulls	16	2	14	0	36
31	Gareth Dean	(Wales)	Prop	21	London Broncos Academy	4	0	0	0	0
