= Daxton Monaghan =

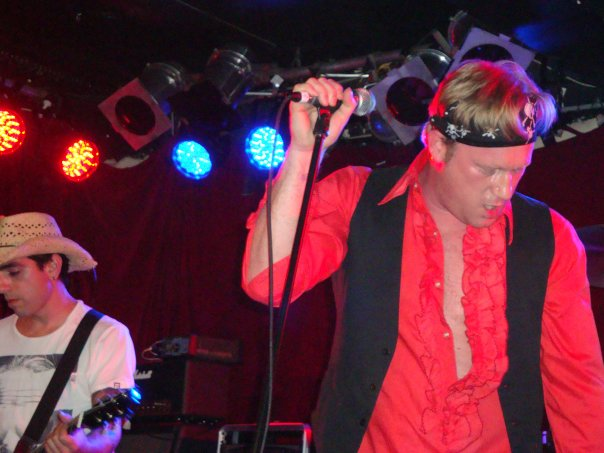

Background information
- Born: Daxton Paul James Monaghan; Central Coast, New South Wales, Australia
- Genres: Blues rock
- Occupation: Musician
- Instruments: Vocals; guitar
- Years active: 1991–present
- Label: MGM
- Website: https://daxtonmonaghan.bandcamp.com/album/serpent-of-the-road-2

Daxton Paul James Monaghan is an Australian musician and songwriter based on the Central Coast, New South Wales. He released numerous albums and performed regularly along the east coast. Daxton's music was aired on national radio stations, and been used on television soundtracks. His style has varied over his career and is predominantly southern blues/rock.

== Biography ==
Daxton Paul James Monaghan spent his childhood on the Central Coast, New South Wales. He attended St Edward's College, East Gosford until age 16. Daxton worked in a range of jobs: printing, sales and hospitality.

At 19 years old, Daxton, on guitar and lead vocals, formed his first band, Horus. His second band, Egg, performed in the Sydney to Newcastle area.

Daxton progressed through a number of musical styles including Alt Country, grunge, punk rock and settled into a Heavy Blues format late in the 1990s. Early in the next decade he re-joined a punk-rock outfit from 2001 to 2002. After they disbanded Daxton played occasional solo gigs.

In 2008 Daxton released an album, Two Roads, with country musician, Bill Chambers as producer. This led to performances at the Tamworth Music festival in 2009 and other blues and country festivals and gigs subsequently. The band was made up of (Aria nominee & Producer) Bill Chambers on pedal Steel, Hamish Stuart (Marcia Hines drummer), Michael Muchow electric Guitar & Rod McCormack banjo.

In 2009 he fronted Daxton & the Sweet Lips and their first release was on iTunes with the self-titled album, which had a heavy distorted blues sound with elements of rock. An album track, "Moody Liz", was used on American TV series, Dollhouse. It received an honourable mention at the International Songwriting Competition in the blues category. The Sweet Lips line-up included Mike Rix on bass, Shayne Brown on drums and Ken Stanhope on harmonica.

In 2009 Daxton joined Sydney musicians and entertainers Andy Kent from You Am I, Jeff O'Connell from Headache, Shayne Pinington and Adam Yee from Smudge for a series of gigs at the Annandale Hotel under the name “The baby baby baby baby yeah yeah yeah's,” a Cult tribute band. Daxton performed as lead singer.

In 2009 Daxton receive significant airplay on CMC television in Australia with the clip for the song "One Way Ride" which was produced by Cory Hopper (who also produced Kasey Chambers album Wayward Angel.)

In 2010 Daxton toured from Australia to the US and played a number of shows on the west coast and at Nashville including shows at The Commodore Grill Holiday Inn, the Douglas Corner Cafe, the Blue Bird Cafe in Nashville and the Hollywood Piano Bar in Los Angeles.

In 2011 Daxton & the Sweet Lips recorded the Thin Tall Lily album which was published by Foghorn Records and was recorded at Damien Gerard Studios. It received international distribution.

Monaghan released "Highway One" through Apple Music on October 13, 2014. The four-track EP gained exposure through Muzic Notez and rave online reviews. The album cover artwork was photographed while on tour on Route 93 In Arizona September 2010 In the USA..

Daxton Monaghan released "Live At Lizotte's" on March 27, 2015. The 27-minute EP features a live performance recorded at the renowned venue and was released on YouTube. Monaghan entertained with a dobro guitar, playing slide blues and was accompanied by a stomp box.

In 2018, Daxton recorded the album "In Verses" at Damian Gerard Studio In Sydney, Balmian. It featured Mike Rix on bass and James McCaffrey on drums." In Verses" single "Sanctuary" reached number two on the AMRAP AIRIT Chart in April 2018. In Verses featured on national radio stations and in television soundtracks.

"Electric Satellite" was released In February 18, 2022 through Foghorn Records. Daxton's sound gave a "heavy and rustic blues rock sound" with influences from artists such as Captain Beefheart, Tom Waits, Canned Heat, and Jimi Hendrix. Following Electric Satellite, Daxton released the album 50% Grit on 30,September 2022.The album is described as a "mini-album" featuring seven, raw, stripped-back psychedelic dirty blues songs. It was produced following a request for music suited to late-night listening, the release was via Foghorn/MGM.

Fahrenheit is an 8-song album by artist Daxton, released on March 22, 2024, through Foghorn Records. The 26-minute project, which features tracks like "Kiss The Girls" and "Ocean Size" it was mastered/co-produced at Damien Gerard Studios, and is available on streaming platforms including, Spotify, Apple Music and Amazon Music.

Daxton Monaghan released his 11th album,"Serpent Of The Road" with his band "The DMT's" through Foghorn Records October 25. Featuring musician's Tim Clarke on drums & Simon Black on bass. The title track, described as"demonic blues", it was released on October 17, 2025. The album is currently receiving national airplay in Australia, Greece, USA and the UK.

== Career highlights ==
=== Awards ===
- Appeared several times in 2011 Australian Blues Top 25 charts
- International Song Writing Competition 2010
- Triple J Unearthed, 2004 Runner Up.
- Number 3 on Australian blues charts 2011

=== Discography ===
Year	Album	Notes
2025	Serpent Of The Road	Released October 17, 2025, received national airplay on AMRAP
2024	Fahrenheit	Released through Foghorn records/MGM
2022	50% Grit	Released through Foghorn Records & MGM
2022	Electric Satellite	Released February 18th through MGM/Foghorn Records
2018	In Verses	featured on National Radoi Stations
2011	Daxton's Stompin Christmas Blues	Christmas covers including Silent Night and Fat Bottomed Girls
2011	Thin Tall Lily	Southern Blues/Rock album
2010	Small Steps for Big Kicks	Country/Blues
2009	Daxton and the Sweet Lips	Self-titled, Southern Blues/Rock album (changed to self title)
2009	Foghorn's Home Grown Roots	Included on compilation album of Sydney artists Feat. song "Moody Liz"
2009	Dollhouse Soundtrack	Song "Moody Liz" featured in Dollhouse Soundtrack
2008	Two Roads	Country album produced by Australian country musician Bill Chambers
2002	Blackweed	Country/Folk album (unreleased)
2000	Blue Room	Jazz/Funk album (unreleased)

=== Notable appearances ===
- Tamworth Country Music Festival, 2011, 2010, 2009
- Sydney Blues and Roots Festival, 2011
- Ironfest, 2012, 2011
- Newtown Festival, 2002
