= Toshack =

Toshack is a surname. Notable people with the surname include:

- Cameron Toshack (born 1970), Welsh footballer and coach
- Ernie Toshack (1914–2003), Australian cricketer
- John Toshack (born 1949), Welsh footballer and manager
- Mat Toshack (born 1973), Australian rugby league footballer
