= Bart Williams (rugby league) =

Australian rugby league footballer

Personal information
- Full name: Bart Williams
- Born: 12 January 1976 (age 50) Australia

Playing information
- Position: Hooker
Club
Years	Team	Pld	T	G	FG	P
1996–97	South Sydney	9	1	0	0	4
1998	London Broncos	8	1	0	0	4
	Total	17	2	0	0	8
- As of 16 Jul 2021

Bart Williams is an Australian former professional rugby league footballer who played in the 1990s. He played for the London Broncos.

== Playing career ==
=== Schoolboys ===
Bart Williams played 2 schoolboy tests against the Junior Kiwi team in 1994. In 1994, the Schoolboys hosted, and defeated, the touring Junior Kiwis. This marked the first appearance of a then 15-year-old Owen Craigie, who would represent the Schoolboys a record three times in 1994, 1995 and 1996. Future Australian internationals Brett Kimmorley, Ben Ikin and Luke Priddis were also in the side.

=== South Sydney ===
Represented South Sydney RLFC 1995–1997. The South Sydney Rabbitohs (often called Souths and The Bunnies) are a professional Australian rugby league team based in Redfern, a suburb of inner-southern Sydney, New South Wales.[3] They participate in the National Rugby League (NRL) premiership and are one of nine existing teams from the state capital.

=== London Broncos ===
In 1998, as part of rugby league's "on the road" scheme London Broncos played Bradford Bulls at Tynecastle in Edinburgh in front of over 22,000 fans.

Success continued in 1998 with a first appearance in the Challenge Cup semi-finals, losing to Wigan. Head coach Tony Currie left the club at the end of the 1998 Super League season and was replaced by Dan Stains.
