= The House of Windsor (TV series) =

- Genre: Comedy
- Directed by: Graeme Harper
- Starring: Leslie Phillips; Warren Clarke; Neil Stacy; Serena Gordon
- Composer: Steve Nieve
- Country of origin: United Kingdom
- Original language: English
- No. of series: 1
- No. of episodes: 6

Production
- Producers: Andy Harries; Tony Wood
- Running time: 30 minutes
- Production company: Granada Television

Original release
- Network: ITV
- Release: 15 May – 26 June 1994

The House of Windsor is a British comedy television series which first aired on ITV from 15 May to 26 June 1994. A top public relations expert is called in to help the British royal family with their image, but he clashes constantly with the more traditional Lord Bermondsey.

== Main cast ==
- Leslie Phillips as Lord Montague Bermondsey
- Warren Clarke as Max Kelvin
- Neil Stacy as Sir Nicholas Foulsham
- Serena Gordon as Caroline Finch
- Jeremy Sinden as Giles Huntingdon
- Sean Gallagher as Ray Barker
- Louise Germaine as Kate Hargreaves
- Barry Howard as Danny Jackson
- Preston Lockwood as Ambrose Stebbings
- Margaret Courtenay as Lady Sharpcott

== Bibliography ==
- Leslie Halliwell & John Walker. Halliwell's Who's who in the Movies. HarperCollinsEntertainment, 2001.
