= Louise Germaine =

English actress and model (born 1971)

- Born: Tina Louise Germaine; 1971 (age 54–55); Margate, Kent, England
- Occupations: Actress; model

Tina Louise Germaine (born 1971) is an English actress and model best known for her appearance as usherette Sylvia Berry in the 1993 Dennis Potter serial Lipstick on Your Collar.

== Early life ==
Germaine's father, David, left her mother, Yvonne, and two elder brothers, Ian and Mark, before she was born.

As Tina Reid, she posed for magazine shoots, when aged fifteen. Her mother ran a guest house on Second Avenue in Cliftonville. Her boyfriend was 19-year-old Lane Abrahams.

== Career ==
She moved to London, and worked as a model in magazines such as 'Just Seventeen'. She worked as a nude model until the age of 17. After appearing as an extra in one scene in Blackeyes (TV series), in 1989, she was spotted by the producer.

'Lipstick on Your Collar' was set in 1956, and was broadcast from February 21 1993, costing £5.8m; Louise was 21. Louise was given the part on her 21st birthday, the same day that she passed her driving test, at the second attempt. Posters advertising the series, with Douglas Henshall, attracted 92 complaints, but the ASA said that the posters were not indecent. The Outdoor Advertising Association had not received any complaints.

She played chambermaid Kate Hargreaves in the six-part 1994 comedy The House of Windsor.

In October 1994, she appeared as Lynne in 'Archangel Night Out', the first of six drama films for BBC Wales Playhouse, made by Teliesyn Productions, filmed at the Great Western pub in Cardiff. She was to be the main character in Karaoke but became pregnant, and insurers would not cover her.

Germaine is said to have inspired one of Dennis Potter's final scripts, Karaoke, but her pregnancy prevented being cast in the production.

She appeared in theatre in October 1996 as Maddy in 'Women Laughing', with husband Tony played by Patrick Field.

== Personal life ==
Aged 17 she moved to Italy to look for modelling work. On the first photo shoot she fell in love with an Italian model, and moved into his basement flat for a year, later driving to Greece to look for work. She later moved to Balham.

On 14 February 1994, she married hairdresser Lee Carter, in Gretna Green.

By 1996 she had moved from Thanet District to north-west Surrey. She had a daughter July 1995.

Louise now resides in south west France and is a property landlord.
