= Neil Stacy =

British actor

- Born: 15 May 1941 (age 85); Stowupland, Suffolk, United Kingdom
- Occupations: Actor, historian
- Years active: 1964–2004 (TV & Film)

Neil Stacy (born 1941) is a British actor and Historian particularly known for his role in the 1980s television series Duty Free.

== Selected television filmography ==
- The Indian Tales of Rudyard Kipling (1964)
- It's Dark Outside (1965)
- Riviera Police (1965)
- Sherlock Holmes (1965)
- The Man in Room 17 (1966)
- Sergeant Cork (1966)
- Colditz Episode – Lord, Didn't it Rain (1972–1974)
- War and Peace (1972–1973)
- Barlow at Large (1973–1975)
- The Pallisers (1974)
- The Standard (1978)
- Return of the Saint (1978)
- Strangers (1979)
- Quatermass (1979)
- Minder (1979)
- To Serve Them All My Days (1980)
- The Fourth Arm (1983)
- Shackleton (1983)
- Strangers and Brothers (1984)
- Cold Warrior (1984)
- Duty Free (1984–1986)
- Shine on Harvey Moon (1985)
- Three Up, Two Down (1986–1987)
- Rumpole of the Bailey (1987)
- Haggard (1990)
- Lovejoy (1992)
- The Upper Hand (1993)
- The House of Windsor (1994)
- Get Well Soon (1997)
- The Lost Prince (2003)
- Heartbeat (2003)

== Bibliography ==
- Tise Vahimagi. British Television: An Illustrated Guide. Oxford University Press, 1996.
- The Haldanes of Gleneagles:A Scottish History from the Twelfth Century to the Present Day, Neil Stacy, 2017 Birlinn Limited,
