= Kinsey (TV series) =

- Created by: Peter Gibbs
- Starring: Leigh Lawson; Serena Gordon; David Savile
- Country of origin: United Kingdom
- Original language: English
- No. of series: 2
- No. of episodes: 12

Production
- Executive producer: Barry Hanson
- Producer: Carol Parks
- Running time: 50 minutes

Original release
- Network: BBC1
- Release: 2 April 1991 – 8 December 1992

Kinsey is a television programme lasting two series, made in 1990/91 and broadcast on BBC 1 from 2 April 1991 to 8 December 1992. It starred Serena Gordon as Tricia Mabbott, Marian McLoughlin as Judy Kinsey and Leigh Lawson as Neil Kinsey. The programme was produced at the BBC Pebble Mill Studios.

== Premise ==
A Midlands lawyer Neil Kinsey, known for being a maverick, takes on a new partner, Tricia Mabbott, who has recently left a larger firm. Kinsey brings an unconventional approach to dealing with his clients' cases, but has to contend with his estranged wife Judy, his rivals, and the potential of romance with Tricia.

All twelve episodes were written by Peter Gibbs.

== Cast ==
- Neil Kinsey – Leigh Lawson
- Tricia Mabbott – Serena Gordon
- Max Barker – David Savile
- Gerry Hollis – Eamon Boland
- Val – Meera Syal
- Keith Schofield – Gavin Richards (Series 1)
- Judy Kinsey – Marian McLoughlin (Series 2)
- Danny – Mark Williams (Series 2)

== Episode list ==
=== Series 1 (1991) ===
No. overall	No. in series	Title	Directed by	Written by	Original release date
1	1	"I've Been Nutmegged, Done Up Like a Kipper"	Phil O'Shea	Peter Gibbs	2 April 1991
2	2	"And I Could Close You Down Tomorrow"	Philip Draycott	Peter Gibbs	9 April 1991
3	3	"The Authentic Voice... Little Miss Goosestep"	Philip Draycott	Peter Gibbs	16 April 1991
4	4	"What Sort of a Lawyer Are You, Mr. Kinsey?"	Philip Draycott	Peter Gibbs	23 April 1991
5	5	"Kinsey's Such a Swine to Deal With Normally"	Philip Draycott	Peter Gibbs	30 April 1991
6	6	"It's Going to Be a Close Call, Kinsey"	Philip Draycott	Peter Gibbs	7 May 1991

=== Series 2 (1992) ===
No. overall	No. in series	Title	Directed by	Written by	Original release date
7	1	"Wet Paint"	Richard Standeven	Peter Gibbs	3 November 1992
8	2	"Comebacks"	Richard Standeven	Peter Gibbs	10 November 1992
9	3	"Heads and Tails"	Anthony Garner	Peter Gibbs	17 November 1992
10	4	"Drop Shot"	Anthony Garner	Peter Gibbs	24 November 1992
11	5	"The Waste Watchers"	Richard Standeven	Peter Gibbs	1 December 1992
12	6	"Conflicts of Interest"	Richard Standeven	Peter Gibbs	8 December 1992
