= Lipstick on Your Collar (TV series) =

1993 British TV series

- Created by: Dennis Potter
- Written by: Dennis Potter
- Directed by: Renny Rye
- Opening theme: "Lipstick on Your Collar" by Connie Francis
- Country of origin: United Kingdom
- Original language: English
- No. of episodes: 6

Production
- Executive producer: Kenith Trodd
- Producer: Dennis Potter
- Cinematography: Sean Van Hales
- Editor: Clare Douglas
- Running time: 60 minutes

Original release
- Network: Channel 4
- Release: 21 February – 28 March 1993

Related
- Pennies from Heaven (1978); The Singing Detective (1986)

Lipstick on Your Collar is a 1993 British television serial written by Dennis Potter. It was first broadcast on Channel 4 between 21 February and 28 March 1993. Expanded from Potter's earlier television play Lay Down Your Arms (1970), it features Ewan McGregor in his first major role.

== Plot ==
The main story is set in a British Military Intelligence Office in Whitehall during 1956, where a small group of foreign affairs analysts find their quiet existence disrupted by the Suez Crisis. Mick Hopper (Ewan McGregor) is completing his national service as a translator of Russian documents. Bored with his job, Hopper spends his days creating fantasy daydreams that involve his colleagues breaking into contemporary hit songs. Sylvia Berry (Louise Germaine) is married to the violent Corporal Pete Berry (Douglas Henshall). Sylvia is an object of desire for Mick's fellow clerk Private Francis Francis (Giles Thomas) and a middle-aged theatre organist named Harold Atterbow (Roy Hudd). In contrast to the street-wise Hopper, Francis is a clumsy Welsh intellectual whose academic career has been interrupted by his army call up. The appearance of the bookish niece of a seconded American officer enables the two conscripts to pair off with suitable partners, after initial mismatching.

The main theme of the series is conflict between the old order, as represented by the middle-aged officers in Whitehall plus Francis' prudish Uncle Fred and Aunt Vickie, and the new 'rock n roll' generation represented by Hopper and Sylvia. Though chronologically the series is set in the late summer and autumn of 1956 culminating in the invasion of Suez, many of the songs used, including the title song, were not released until later in the 1950s.

Some of the side themes include the influence of American rock and roll on British society, the gulf between the senior analysts, who are regular army officers, and the conscripted other ranks, the work of Russian playwright Chekhov, and an appreciation of opulent theatre organs. The unusual context – a military culture transplanted into a civil service style office environment – reflects Potter's own national service during the 1950s.

== Cast ==
- Giles Thomas as Pte. Francis Francis
- Ewan McGregor as Pte. Mick Hopper
- Louise Germaine as Sylvia Berry
- Roy Hudd as Harold Atterbow
- Douglas Henshall as Cpl. Pete Berry
- Peter Jeffrey as Col. Bernwood
- Clive Francis as Maj. Hedges
- Nicholas Jones as Maj. Carter
- Nicholas Farrell as Maj. Church
- Shane Rimmer as Lt. Col. Trekker
- Kymberley Huffman as Lisa Trekker
- Maggie Steed as Aunt Vickie
- Bernard Hill as Uncle Fred
- Debra Beaumont as Nina

== Additional information ==
Lipstick on Your Collar is an expansion of the earlier play Lay Down Your Arms (1970). Some critics view it as being the final entry in the musical trilogy Potter began with Pennies from Heaven (1978) and The Singing Detective (1986). This was the final serial produced during Dennis Potter's lifetime and was nominated in 1994 for two BAFTA Awards, in the categories "Best Makeup" and "Best Music".

== Music ==
The series contained among others the following music:

- "Lipstick on Your Collar" by Connie Francis (opening theme)
- "The Man with the Golden Arm" by The Billy May Orchestra
- "The Great Pretender," "Only You (And You Alone)" and "My Prayer" by The Platters
- "Earth Angel" and "Sh-Boom" by The Crewcuts
- "Little Bitty Pretty One" by Thurston Harris
- "Garden of Eden" & "Green Door" by Frankie Vaughan
- "Blueberry Hill" and "I'm in Love Again" by Fats Domino
- "Don't Be Cruel" by Elvis Presley
- "The Story of My Life" by Michael Holliday
- "It's Almost Tomorrow" by The Dreamweavers
- "Your Cheatin' Heart" by Hank Williams
- "In a Persian Market" and "In a Monastery Garden" composed by Albert Ketèlbey played by Nigel Ogden
- "Blue Suede Shoes" by Carl Perkins
- "Raining in My Heart" by Buddy Holly
- "Be-Bop-A-Lula" by Gene Vincent
- "By a Sleepy Lagoon" by William Thorp and Mike Houghton
- "Jealousy" by William Thorp, Mike Houghton and Jack Emblow
- "Unchained Melody" by Les Baxter
- "Try a Little Tenderness" and "So Tired"
- "I'm Beginning to See the Light" composed by Duke Ellington and Harry James
- "Young Love" by Sonny James
- "The Fool" by Sanford Clark
- "Band of Gold" by Don Cherry
- "Sanctuary of the Heart" by Albert Ketelby played by Nigel Ogden
- "Robin Hood (TV Theme)" by Garry Miller
- "Heartbreak Hotel"
- "It'll Be Me" performed by Jerry Lee Lewis
- "Love Is Strange" performed by Mickey & Sylvia
- "Lotta Lovin'" by Gene Vincent
- "Lay Down Your Arms" by Anne Shelton
- "I See the Moon" by The Stargazers
