= Shackleton (1983 TV series) =

- Genre: Drama
- Written by: Christopher Ralling
- Directed by: Martyn Friend
- Starring: David Schofield
- Country of origin: United Kingdom
- Original language: English
- No. of series: 1
- No. of episodes: 4

Production
- Running time: 55 minutes
- Production company: BBC

Original release
- Network: BBC Two
- Release: 13 April – 4 May 1983

Shackleton is a British period television drama series which aired in four parts on BBC 2 in 1983. It portrays the Antarctic expeditions of the explorer Sir Ernest Shackleton. Scriptwriter Christopher Ralling drew on Shackleton's own journals, which were re-published by the BBC as a tie-in to the series.

== Cast ==
- David Schofield as Sir Ernest Shackleton
- David Rodigan as Frank Wild
- Michael Hayward as 'Putty' Marston
- Robert Lang as Major Darwin
- Robert James as Sir John Scott-Keltie
- Victoria Fairbrother as Emily Shackleton
- Neil Stacy as Captain R. F. Scott
- Geoffrey Chater as Sir Clements Markham
- Anthony Bate as Lord Curzon
- Benjamin Whitrow as Roald Amundsen
- Michael Sheard as Dr. Koettlitz
- Kevin Whately as Jameson Adams
- Leslie Schofield as Ernie Joyce
- John Wheatley as Percy Blackborrow
- Tara Hiatt as Small Child

== Bibliography ==
- Ellen Baskin. Serials on British Television, 1950-1994. Scolar Press, 1996.
- Neville Peat. Shackleton's Whisky: A Spirit of Discovery: Ernest Shackleton's 1907 Antarctic Expedition, and the Rare Malt Whisky He Left Behind. Penguin Random House, 2012.
