= Serena Gordon =

British actress

- Born: 3 September 1963 (age 62); London, England
- Years active: 1987–present
- Spouses: Tim Laurence (m. 2011, divorced); Adam Douglas (m. 2013)
- Children: 2

Serena Mary Strathearn Gordon (born 3 September 1963) is an English actress. Her roles include Amanda Prosser in police drama The Bill and MI6 evaluator Caroline in 1995 James Bond film GoldenEye.

== Life and career ==
Born in London, she is the daughter of property consultant Ian Gordon and magistrate Nicola Norman-Butler. Her great-great-grandfather was the Scottish judge and politician Edward Strathearn Gordon, Baron Gordon of Drumearn; the Norman-Butler family were landed gentry.

Gordon studied at RADA in the same year as Jane Horrocks, where the two became best friends. After college, they shared a flat in Bayswater and celebrated their joint 30th birthday party at the Groucho Club.

Gordon separated from her husband, Tim Laurence, in 2011. Together, they run the UK branch of the Hoffman Institute, which runs a personal development programme founded by Bob Hoffman in 1967. They have two sons.

== Filmography ==
| Year | Film | Character | Notes |
|---|---|---|---|
| 1987 | Maurice | Gladys Olcott | Uncredited |
| 1987 | The New Statesman | Victoria | Episode: "Passport to Freedom" |
| 1987 | Queenie | Prunella Rumsey | 2 episodes |
| 1988 | Hannay | Simone Angeketell | Episode: "Death with Due Notice" |
| 1988 | Tumbledown | Phyllida | TV movie |
| 1989 | Act of Will | Gwen | TV mini-series |
| 1989 | A Tale of Two Cities | Lucie Manette | 2 episodes |
| 1989 | After the War | Annie Rose | 3 episodes |
| 1989 | Till We Meet Again | Jane Longbridge | 1 episode |
| 1989 | The Shell Seekers | Annabel | TV movie |
| 1990 | Kinsey | Tricia Mabbott | 12 episodes |
| 1992 | The Casebook of Sherlock Holmes | Lady Eva Blackwell | Episode: "The Master Blackmailer" |
| 1993 | Riders | Janey Henderson | TV movie |
| 1993 | Dancing Queen | Sophie | TV movie |
| 1994 | 99–1 | Serena Wise | 1 episode |
| 1994 | The House of Windsor | Caroline Finch | 6 episodes |
| 1994 | Blue Heaven | Shereen | Episode No.1.4 |
| 1995 | Chiller | Louise Knight | Episode: "Toby" |
| 1995 | GoldenEye | Caroline | |
| 1996 | Tales from the Crypt | Unknown | Episode: "The Kidnapper" |
| 1997 | For My Baby | Molly | |
| 1997 | Diana & Me | Lady Sarah Myers-Booth | |
| 1998 | Speak Like a Child | Matron | |
| 1999 | Tom's Midnight Garden | Melody Long | |
| 1999 | Aristocrats | Lady Caroline Fox | 5 episodes |
| 2000 | The House of Mirth | Gwen Stepney | |
| 2000 | Other People's Children | Elizabeth | 2 episodes |
| 2001 | Monarch of the Glen | Mary | Episode No.2.1 |
| 2001 | Messiah | Alison Reeves | 2 episodes |
| 2003 | Silent Witness | Sally Bowman | Episode: "Answering Fire" – Parts 1 and 2 |
| 2004 | Murder City | Maxine Hulme | Episode: "Under the Skin" |
| 2005 | Heartless | Shona | TV movie |
| 2005 | The Bill | Acting Superintendent Amanda Prosser | 9 episodes |
| 2007 | Natasha | Jan Loomis | |
| 2007 | Holby City | Elaine Taylor | Episode: "Bitter from the Sweet" |
| 2002–2008 | Midsomer Murders | Ginny Sharp / Christina Finleyson | 2 episodes |
