= Bradman Best =

Australia international rugby league footballer

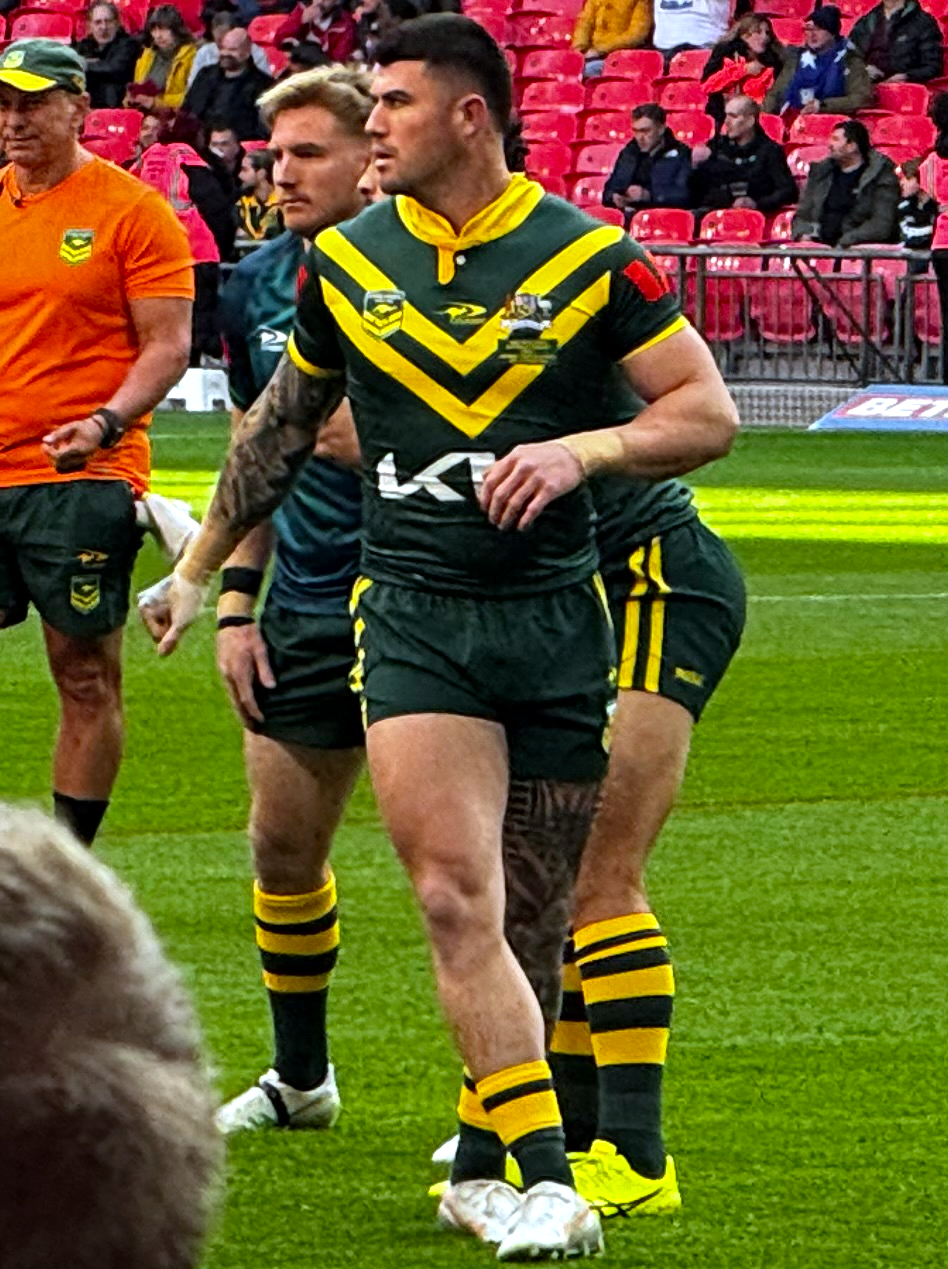

Personal information
- Full name: Bradman Best
- Born: 9 August 2001 (age 25) Gosford, New South Wales, Australia
- Height: 182 cm (6 ft 0 in)
- Weight: 103 kg (16 st 3 lb)

Playing information
- Position: Centre
Club
Years	Team	Pld	T	G	FG	P
2019–	Newcastle Knights	127	47	0	0	188
Representative
Years	Team	Pld	T	G	FG	P
2023–26	New South Wales	3	4	0	0	16
2025	Prime Minister's XIII	1	0	0	0	0
2026–	Australia	4	2	0	0	4
- Source: As of 17 November 2026
- Education: St Edward's College, East Gosford
- Father: Roger Best

Bradman Best (born 9 August 2001) is an Australian professional rugby league footballer who plays as a centre for the Newcastle Knights in the NRL and Australia at international level.

== Background ==
Best was born on the Central Coast, New South Wales and is of Indigenous Australian and Welsh descent.

Best was educated at St Edward's College, East Gosford and he played his junior rugby league for the Woy Woy Roosters, before being signed by the Newcastle Knights.

Best is the son of former Manly Warringah Sea Eagles and London Broncos player Roger Best.

== Playing career ==
=== Early years ===
Coming through the Newcastle lower grades, Best also represented the New South Wales under-16s and under-18s sides along the way. At the age of 17, Best was invited to train with Newcastle's NRL squad. In late 2018, he played for the Australian Schoolboys and re-signed with the Newcastle club on a four-year contract until the end of 2022.

=== 2019 ===
In 2019, between injuries, Best split his time playing with Newcastle's Jersey Flegg Cup team and Canterbury Cup NSW team. By August, he turned 18 and was therefore eligible to play NRL. Shortly after, he returned from a foot injury in the Jersey Flegg Cup, scoring three tries and being named man of the match. The following week, in Round 23, he made his NRL debut for the Newcastle club in their 4-46 loss to the Wests Tigers at Campbelltown Stadium. In round 24, he scored his first NRL try in Newcastle's 38-4 win over the Gold Coast Titans at McDonald Jones Stadium in Newcastle.

=== 2020 ===
Despite scoring two tries in Round 3 against the Penrith Panthers, Best failed to provide an assist to teammate Edrick Lee in the final stages of the match; which ended in a 14–14 draw. In response, Lee and Best practiced one-on-one passing in the lead-up to the Round 4 match against the Canberra Raiders. In the Round 4 match, Best scored another two tries and provided a try assist; which had Lee score the try in a similar scenario to the previous match. After the game, Best sparked instantaneous social media attention, controversially likened to other Australian athletes such as Don Bradman for his performance in Newcastle's 34–18 win over Canberra.

=== 2021 ===
On 27 March, Best was ruled out of action for four weeks with an elbow injury in Newcastle's victory over the New Zealand Warriors.

In round 14, Best was taken from the field in Newcastle's loss against South Sydney and was ruled out for an indefinite period. Best returned to the Newcastle side for their round 20 match against Canberra. In Round 21 against Brisbane, he injured his shoulder during the game and was taken to hospital for scans.

=== 2022 ===
In round 11 of the 2022 NRL season, Best was taken from the field during Newcastle's defeat against Brisbane with a dislocated elbow. Best was later ruled out from playing for an indefinite period.

On 16 August, it was announced that Best had been stood down from the Newcastle club for not meeting team standards. Best had played in the club's loss against Brisbane in Round 22 but failed to make the team bus which was heading to the airport the next morning.

=== 2023 ===
In round 18 of the 2023 NRL season, Best scored a hat-trick in Newcastle's 66-0 victory over Canterbury. The following day, Best was a surprise selection by New South Wales for game 3 of the 2023 State of Origin series. He scored two tries on debut for New South Wales as they won the match 24-10 and avoided a series clean sweep.

In round 26, Best scored two tries for Newcastle in their 32-6 victory over Cronulla. He played a total of 25 games for Newcastle in the 2023 NRL season and scored 13 tries as the club finished 5th on the table. Best played in both finals games as Newcastle were eliminated in the second week of the finals by the New Zealand Warriors.

=== 2024 ===
Best re-signed with the Newcastle outfit until the end of the 2027 season. During game three of the State of Origin decider at Suncorp Stadium, Best scored one of two NSW tries in the game, to win NSW the series. Best played 17 games for Newcastle in the 2024 NRL season as the club finished 8th and qualified for the finals. They were eliminated in the first week of the finals by North Queensland.

=== 2025 ===
Best played 18 matches for Newcastle in the 2025 NRL season and scored six tries as the club finished with the Wooden Spoon.

=== 2026 ===
In game three of the 2026 State of Origin series, similar to 2024, Best scored a pivotal long range try at Suncorp stadium with the series drawn, followed by an interception in the final ten minutes to help secure a NSW victory 30-12. Best remains undefeated in his three starts for NSW.

Best played 18 matches for Newcastle in the 2026 NRL season including their 2026 NRL Grand Final loss to the Sydney Roosters. He made his Australia international début in the 2026 Rugby League World Cup 36-22 win over Fiji on 25 October 2026. On 15 November 2026, Best played in Australia's 2026 Rugby League World Cup final victory over New Zealand.

== Statistics ==
Year	Team	Games	Tries	Pts
2019	Newcastle Knights	3	1	4
2020	Newcastle Knights	11	8	32
2021	Newcastle Knights	17	3	12
2022	Newcastle Knights	14	5	20
2023	Newcastle Knights	25	13	52
2024	Newcastle Knights	17	7	28
2025	Newcastle Knights	18	6	24
2026	Newcastle Knights	22	4	16
2027	Newcastle Knights			
	Totals	127	47	188

=== Honours ===
State of Origin Series Winner: 2024, 2026

Rugby League World Cup Champion: 2026

*Denotes season competing
