= The Standard (TV series) =

The Standard is a television series. Produced by BBC Scotland in 1978, it was shown on BBC1.

The series dealt with an ailing Scottish newspaper – the eponymous Standard – and the attempts to reverse its declining fortunes by its team of journalists and administrators.

Only one series of thirteen episodes was made. The series starred Patrick Malahide, Colette O'Neil, Tom Watson and Neil Stacy.
