= Act of Will =

- DVD cover
- Genre: Drama
- Based on: Act of Will by Barbara Taylor Bradford
- Written by: Jill Hyem
- Directed by: Don Sharp
- Starring: Serena Gordon; Melanie Jessop; Victoria Tennant; Elizabeth Hurley; Peter Coyote
- Composer: Barrie Guard
- Country of origin: United Kingdom
- Original language: English
- No. of seasons: 1
- No. of episodes: 4

Production
- Executive producer: Tom Donald
- Producers: Victor Glynn; Ian Warren
- Running time: 200 mins
- Production companies: Tyne Tees Television; Portman Entertainment

Original release
- Network: ITV
- Release: 15 September – 6 October 1989

Act of Will is a 1989 miniseries directed by Don Sharp and based on the 1986 novel by Barbara Taylor Bradford. It the third miniseries based on a Bradford novel Sharp had directed and was an early lead role for Elizabeth Hurley.

It was the last directing credit for Sharp.

== Plot ==
The story of three generations of women, from 1926 to the present day.

== Cast ==
- Victoria Tennant as Audra Crowther
  - Rachel Robertson as Audra Aged 14
- Kevin McNally as Vincent Crowther
- Peter Coyote as Miles Sutherland
- Elizabeth Hurley as Christina Crowther
  - Jo Gabb as Christina Aged 15
  - Louisa Janes as Christina Aged 10
- Lynsey Baxter as Jane Sedgewick
- Serena Gordon as Gwen Thornton
- Jean Marsh as Eliza Crowther
- Melanie Jessop as Laurette Crowther
- Sheila Allen as Lady Dulcie Sedgewick
- Richard Bebb as Sir Ralph Sedgewick
- Judy Parfitt as Alicia Drummond
- Simon Merrick as Percival Drummond
- Stuart Milligan as Alex Newman
- Gillian Bevan as Millie Arnold
- Rebecca Callard as Maggie Crowther
- Julian Gartside as Jeffery Freemantle
- Andrew Castell as Mike Leslie
- Ewan Hooper as Alfred Crowther
- Ken Jones as Dr. Stalkey
- Sheila Ruskin as Candida Sutherland
- Fiona Walker as Matron Lennox
- Sarah Winman as Kyle Newman
