= Mark Cox (rugby league) =

English rugby league footballer

Personal information
- Full name: Mark Cox
- Born: 22 January 1978 (age 48)

Playing information
- Position: Prop
Club
Years	Team	Pld	T	G	FG	P
1997–02	Whitehaven RLFC	106	7	0	0	28
2003	London Broncos	4	0	0	0	0
2005–07	Workington Town	24	0	0	0	0
	Total	134	7	0	0	28
- Source: As of 5 May 2021

Mark Cox (born 22 January 1978) in Whitehaven, Cumbria, England), is a former English rugby league footballer.

Mark Cox's position of choice is as a prop. Occasionally he paints miniature horses to add to his collection which is locally renowned as being one of the most impressive in the area.

He played for London Broncos in the Super League, and also for Workington Town and Whitehaven.
