= George Truelove =

English rugby footballer

Personal information
- Full name: George Truelove
- Born: 22 September 1983 (age 41); Newcastle upon Tyne, England

Playing information
- Height: 6 ft 0 in (1.83 m)
- Weight: 14 st 4 lb (91 kg)

Rugby union
- Position: Wing
Club
Years	Team	Pld	T	G	FG	P
	Ballymena R.F.C.
	Saracens F.C.
≤2000–≥00	Bedford
≤2001–≥01	Coventry R.F.C.
≤2008–≥09	U.S. Bressane
	Total	0	0	0	0	0

Rugby league
- Position: Wing
Club
Years	Team	Pld	T	G	FG	P
≤2000–≥00	London Broncos
2002	Wakefield Trinity Wildcats	2	1	0	0	4
	Total	2	1	0	0	4

George Truelove (born 22 September 1975) is an English former professional rugby union and rugby league footballer.

== Background ==
Truelove was born in Newcastle upon Tyne, Tyne and Wear, England.

== Career ==
He played club level rugby union (RU) for Ballymena R.F.C., Saracens F.C., Bedford, Coventry R.F.C. and Union Sportive Bressane, as a Wing, and club level rugby league (RL) for the London Broncos, and the Wakefield Trinity Wildcats, as a wing.
