= Steve Thomas (rugby) =

Wales international rugby league footballer

Personal information
- Full name: Steven Thomas
- Born: 26 September 1980 (age 45) Truro, Cornwall, England

Playing information

Rugby union
- Position: Centre
Club
Years	Team	Pld	T	G	FG	P
	Gloucester RFC	0	0	0	0	0
	Neath RFC	100	0	0	0	0
	Total	100	0	0	0	0

Rugby league
- Position: Wing, Centre, Stand-off, Second-row
Club
Years	Team	Pld	T	G	FG	P
2001	Warrington Wolves	2	0	0	0	0
2004	London Broncos	6	0	0	0	0
	Total	8	0	0	0	0
Representative
Years	Team	Pld	T	G	FG	P
1999–07	Wales	5	2	0	0	8
- Source: As of 24 May 2021

Steve Thomas (26 September 1979 (age 46)) is an English rugby union and rugby league footballer who played wing, centre, stand-off, second-row for Bradford Bulls and London Broncos. He is a Wales international.

Thomas played rugby union for Gloucester, and made over 100 appearances for Neath winning five Principality Premiership titles, two Konica Minolta Cups. In the process, he held the record for tries in a season with 30 – 22 in the league and 8 in the cup. He scored against Romania in a Rugby World Cup warm-up match. He also made three appearances for the Llanelli Scarlets regional side at the end of the 2004–05 season.

== Background ==
Thomas was born in Truro, Cornwall, England, and educated at Bassaleg School in Newport, South Wales.

== International honours ==
Steve Thomas won caps for Wales while at Bradford Bulls, London Broncos scoring on his début vs Ireland aged just 19 at Swansea City's Vetch Field. Between 1999 and 2007 he appeared 5 times for Wales (including one as substitute), scoring 2 tries and 8 points.

Before moving to professional rugby league at 16, Thomas won junior international rugby union honours for Wales U19 vs Canada and Portugal. He scored 2 tries for Wales RL U19 vs England at Centre, and represented Great Britain Academy vs France later the same year.
