= Andy McNally =

English rugby league footballer

Personal information
- Full name: Andrew McNally
- Born: 9 January 1982 (age 43)

Playing information
- Position: Fullback, Wing, Centre, Stand-off
Club
Years	Team	Pld	T	G	FG	P
2000–03	Castleford Tigers	7	1	0	0	4
2003	Featherstone Rovers	24+10	14	1	0	58
2004	London Broncos
2005	Featherstone Rovers
	Total	41	15	1	0	62

Andy McNally (born 9 January 1982) is a former professional rugby league footballer who played in the 2000s. He played at club level for the Castleford Tigers, Featherstone Rovers (two spells), and the London Broncos, as a fullback, wing, centre, or stand-off.

== Club career ==
Andy McNally made his début for Featherstone Rovers on Sunday 19 January 2003, and he played his last match (in his second spell) for Featherstone Rovers during the 2005 season.
