= St Edward's College, East Gosford =

St Edward's College

Location
- East Gosford, New South Wales; Australia; 33°26′20″S 151°20′52″E

Information
- Type: Independent secondary day school
- Motto: Latin: Fide ac Scientia (Through Faith and Knowledge)
- Religious affiliation: Roman Catholic
- Denomination: Congregation of Christian Brothers
- Established: 1953; 73 years ago
- Founder: Congregation of Christian Brothers
- Trust: Edmund Rice Education Australia
- Principal: Mark Bonnici
- Staff: c. 100
- Gender: Boys
- Enrolment: 1000 (2024)
- Houses: Doolan Knights Shanahan Spillane
- Colours: Black and red
- Slogan: Where Young Men Achieve
- Nickname: Eddies
- Website: www.stedwards.nsw.edu.au

St Edward's College is an independent Catholic secondary day school for boys, located in East Gosford, in the Central Coast region of New South Wales, Australia. The school was founded by the Congregation of Christian Brothers in 1953, who continue to run the school. Colloquially referred to as Eddies, the College caters for boys from Year 7 to Year 12. St. Edward's is the only Catholic independent all-boys' secondary school located on the NSW Central Coast. It has approximately 1,000 students and 100 staff.

== History ==
The school was opened in 1953 by the Congregation of Christian Brothers.

The Regal Theatre, in the city, was demolished in 1978 and the remains of the building were used as land fill for the College ovals.

In 2003, St Edward's College celebrated its 50th anniversary and on the day of its creation Founders Day used to be celebrated at the school with markets and games.

In 2013, St Edward's College celebrated its 60th anniversary.

In 2023, St Edward's College celebrated its 70th anniversary.

== Facilities ==
St Edward’s covers a nine hectare site on the shores of Caroline Bay. The College has three multi-purpose ovals, other sporting facilities, a multipurpose hall/gymnasium known as the Edmund Rice Centre (or ERC), specialised technology and art facilities, computer laboratories, a library housing more than 7000 books, three music rooms in addition to 6 practical rooms and a purpose built food technology room.

== Academic arrangements ==
The College operate a year 7 Core programme where the students are placed in 'Core classes'. Here the students have one teacher in the same room, for their core subjects of English, Religion and HSIE. They then go to their other subjects. This approach helps ease the transition from primary to high school.

== Co-curricular program ==
=== Outdoor education ===
St Edward's College runs an Outdoor Education programme through camps, which are held in Years 7 to 10. The programme provides a sequential course for the four years, developing skills of a higher order each year. Some of the activities conducted on these camps include archery, canoeing, "deep and meaningful" conversation sessions, sailing, windsurfing, abseiling, rock climbing, mountain biking, initiative challenges and fencing.

=== Social justice ===
The college has a significant emphasis on the concept of social justice and 'giving back' to the community; and is described as a 'Central part of school life at St. Edwards'. In 2002, teacher, Patrick [Pack-a-day-Pat] Dell introduced a programme called The Waterford Project, where boys from years 8-11 perform compulsory community service and offers a wide variety of activities to help students complete their hours. The Waterford Project is named for the city in Ireland where Edmund Ignatius Rice, the founder of the Christian Brothers', began his work.

== Sport ==
- 2005 – The school won its third state basketball title in four years.
- 2008 – U/14 NSW Country Rugby Union Champions. Vincent Fester Shield Winners
- 2008 – Final 16 of the Arrive Alive Cup Rugby league competition
- 2012 – U/16 NSW All Schools Rugby League Champions
- 2014 – U/16 NSW rugby union sevens champions. Edu Connex Central Coast sevens $1000 tournament winners.

== Notable alumni ==
Upon leaving school, students are known as Old Boys and are able to join into the Old Boys Union, an organisation of ex-students that seeks to maintain the friendships created while at the College.

- Bradman Best – Rugby League Player
- Paul Bevan – Australian rules football player
- Oliver Bozanic – footballer
- Larry Davidson – basketball player
- Alex Hale – Australian-American football player
- Matt Hodgson – Rugby League Player
- Tim Kelaher – Rugby Union Player
- James Maloney – Rugby League Player
- Jacob Saifiti – Rugby League Player
- Daniel Saifiti – Rugby League Player
- Jake Mamo – Rugby League Player
- Matthew Simon – footballer
- Tom Slingsby – sailor, Olympic gold medallist at the 2012 Summer Olympics
- Tom Starling – Rugby League Player
- Connor Watson – Rugby League Player
- Sandon Smith – Rugby League Player

== See also ==
- List of non-government schools in New South Wales
- Catholic education in Australia
