= Iain Higgins =

Scotland international rugby league player (born 1976)

Personal information
- Full name: Robert 'Iain' Higgins
- Born: 14 September 1976 (age 49)

Playing information
- Position: Centre, Second-row
Club
Years	Team	Pld	T	G	FG	P
1997–98	London Broncos	9	2	0	0	8
1998–01	Hunslet Hawks	56	18	2	0	76
2002	Rochdale Hornets	15	7	0	0	28
2003	Hunslet Hawks	29	6	0	0	24
	Total	109	33	2	0	136
Representative
Years	Team	Pld	T	G	FG	P
1997–01	Scotland	2	0	0	0	0

Robert 'Iain' Higgins (born 14 September 1976) is a cricket administrator and former professional rugby league player who played in the 1990s and 2000s.

He played at representative level for Scotland, and at club level for London Broncos and Hunslet Hawks, as a centre, or second-row. Higgins won caps for Scotland while at London Broncos and Hunslet Hawks 1997–2001 1-cap + 1-cap (sub).

He was formerly the chief executive officer of USA Cricket from 2019 to 2021 and the chief operating officer of the ICC from 2015 to 2019. The end of Higgins' term as USA Cricket CEO was mired in controversy, ultimately resulting in a US$300,000 payment from the board as the result of a contract dispute.

Higgins is currently a managing director at Ellvee, "a Dubai-based commercial and strategic advisory business for the sports and entertainment industry", according to Forbes.
