= Radney Bowker =

English rugby league footballer

Personal information
- Born: 5 February 1979 (age 47) Billinge Higher End, Wigan, England

Playing information
- Position: Stand-off, Loose forward
Club
Years	Team	Pld	T	G	FG	P
1998–00	Leigh Centurions	4	2	0	0	8
2001(loan)	→ St Helens	1	0	0	0	0
2002	Barrow Raiders	35	13	0	0	52
2003	Salford City Reds	1	1	0	0	4
2003(loan)	→ Rochdale Hornets	18	10	0	0	40
2004	London Broncos	5	1	0	0	4
2004	Leigh Centurions	7	3	0	0	12
2005	Rochdale Hornets	24	10	0	0	40
2006	Halifax	5	2	0	0	8
	Total	100	42	0	0	168

Radney Bowker (born 5 February 1979) is an English former professional rugby league footballer who played in the 1990s and 2000s. He played at club level for Leigh Centurions (two spells), St. Helens (loan) in 2001's Super League VI, Barrow Raiders, Salford City Reds, Rochdale Hornets (two spells, including the first on loan), London Broncos in 2004's Super League IX, and Halifax, as a stand-off or loose forward.

== Background ==
Bowker was born in Billinge, Merseyside.
