= Andrew Duncan (rugby league) =

Scotland international rugby league footballer

Personal information
- Full name: Andrew Duncan
- Born: 13 September 1972 (age 52)

Playing information
Club
| Years | Team | Pld | T | G | FG | P |
|---|---|---|---|---|---|---|
| 1997 | Warrington Wolves | 2+2 | 0 | 0 | 0 | 0 |
| 1997 | London Broncos | 8 | 3 | 0 | 0 | 12 |
| | Total | 12 | 3 | 0 | 0 | 12 |
Representative
| Years | Team | Pld | T | G | FG | P |
| 1997 | Scotland | 1 |

Andrew Duncan (born 13 September 1972) is a former professional rugby league footballer who played in the 1990s. He played at representative level for Scotland, and at club level for Fortitude Valley Diehards, Eastern Suburbs Tigers, Warrington Wolves, and London Broncos.

== International honours ==
Andrew Duncan won a cap for Scotland while at London Broncos 1997 1-cap (interchange/substitute).
