= Roger Best (rugby league) =

Australian rugby league footballer

Personal information
- Full name: Roger Best
- Born: 18 March 1974 (age 52) Ipswich, Queensland, Australia

Playing information
- Position: Second-row
Club
Years	Team	Pld	T	G	FG	P
1997–98	London Broncos	11	1	0	0	4
- Relatives: Bradman Best (son)

Roger Best (born 18 March 1974) is an Australian former professional rugby league footballer who played in the 1990s.

Primarily a second-rower, he played for the London Broncos in the Super League.

== Background ==
Best grew up in Ipswich, Queensland and played his junior rugby league for Ipswich Brothers. He attended Raceview State School and Bremer State High School.

His son, Bradman Best, currently plays for the Newcastle Knights.

== Playing career ==
In 1991, Best represented Queensland Under-19s and was selected for the Australian Schoolboys on their tour of England.

In 1992, he joined the Manly Sea Eagles, where he spent five seasons in their lower grades without a first grade appearance.

In 1997, Best joined the London Broncos in England's Super League, spending two seasons with the club. In 1999, he returned to Australia and played for the Woy Woy Roosters in the Central Coast Rugby League.
