= Tom Haughey =

English rugby league footballer

Personal information
- Full name: Thomas Haughey
- Born: 30 January 1982 (age 43); Keighley, West Yorkshire, England

Playing information
- Position: Centre, Second-row
Club
Years	Team	Pld	T	G	FG	P
2001–02	Wakefield Trinity	20	0	1	0	2
2003–04	London Broncos	21	1	0	0	4
2004(loan)	→ Featherstone Rovers	8	3	0	0	12
2005–06	Castleford Tigers	35	20	0	0	80
2007–09	Featherstone Rovers	82	42	0	0	168
2010–13	Hunslet Hawks	86	28	0	0	112
2012(loan)	→ York City Knights	9	1	0	0	4
	Total	261	95	1	0	382

Tom Haughey (born 30 January 1982 in Keighley, West Yorkshire, England) is a rugby league footballer who played for Wakefield Trinity (2001-2002), London Broncos (2003-2004), Featherstone Rovers (2004 {on loan} and 2007–2009), Castleford Tigers (2005-2006), Hunslet Hawks (2010-2013) and York City Knights (2012)

Tom has scored the ‘2nd fastest’ hat-trick in rugby league history.

He was selected for the Irish international squad, but never played in a match for them.

His position of choice is in the Second-row, and centre.
