= Abraham Fatnowna =

Australian former rugby league footballer

Personal information
- Full name: Abraham Fatnowna
- Born: 19 April 1974 (age 50); Australia

Playing information
- Position: Fullback, Wing
Club
| Years | Team | Pld | T | G | FG | P |
|---|---|---|---|---|---|---|
| 1992–93 | Brisbane Broncos | 2 | 0 | 0 | 0 | 0 |
| 1996–97 | Workington Town | 21 | 8 | 0 | 0 | 32 |
| 1997–98 | London Broncos | 14 | 5 | 0 | 0 | 20 |
| 1999 | Hunslet Hawks | 34 | 20 | 0 | 0 | 80 |
| | Total | 71 | 33 | 0 | 0 | 132 |
- As of 25 February 2021

Abraham "Butch" Fatnowna (born 19 April 1974) is an Australian former rugby league footballer who played for Brisbane Broncos, Workington Town, London Broncos and Hunslet Hawks.

Fatnowna joined Workington in July 1996 during the inaugural Super League season. A year later, he joined London.
