= Matt Dunford =

Australian rugby league footballer

Personal information
- Born: 4 March 1968 (age 57)

Playing information
- Height: 185 cm (6 ft 1 in)
- Weight: 103 kg (16 st 3 lb)
- Position: Hooker, Second-row, Lock, Prop
Club
Years	Team	Pld	T	G	FG	P
1990–96	Manly Sea Eagles	81	7	0	0	28
1997–98	London Broncos	25	6	0	1	25
	Total	106	13	0	1	53

Matt Dunford (born 4 March 1968) is an Australian former professional rugby league footballer who played in the 1990s. Dunford played for Manly-Warringah in the NSWRL, and the ARL and London Broncos in the Super League.

== Playing career ==
Dunford made his first grade debut for Manly-Warringah in round 1 1990 against Balmain at Leichhardt Oval. In the same year, Dunford played in Manly's Minor Semi-Final loss to the Brisbane Broncos.

In 1991, Dunford played 21 games for Manly, mostly as their starting hooker. Unfortunately this also included both of their finals matches against North Sydney and Canberra which ended in defeat. For Manly it was a sad exit for the Graham Lowe coached side who had finished the minor round in 2nd place, but the late season loss of Des Hasler and Ian Roberts to injury couldn't be overcome. Dunford subsequently played for Manly in their 1994 finals campaign where they were once again defeated by Brisbane.

In the 1995 ARL season, Dunford played 9 games for Manly as the club won the minor premiership losing only twice in the process but did not feature in their finals campaign or grand final loss to Canterbury. In the 1996 ARL season, Dunford only featured in 2 games for Manly as they won the minor premiership for a second consecutive year.

In 1997, Dunford signed for English side the London Broncos and played two seasons with them before retiring. His son Zane (b.2002) currently plays for Manly's NSW Cup feeder club, the Blacktown Workers Sea Eagles.
