= Yusef Sozi =

Ugandan-British rugby league footballer

Yusuf Sozi
Personal information
- Born: 20 December 1981 (age 44) Kampala, Uganda

Playing information
- Position: Prop
Club
Years	Team	Pld	T	G	FG	P
2000–01	London Broncos	6	0	0	0	0
2002	Batley Bulldogs	5	0	0	0	0
2002–03	Newcastle Thunder	37	3	0	0	12
2004–05	York City Knights	59	14	0	0	56
2006	Doncaster RLFC	19	0	0	0	0
2008	Sheffield Eagles	2	0	0	0	0
2008	Rochdale Hornets	1	0	0	0	0
	Total	129	17	0	0	68
- Source: As of 14 Jul 2021

Yusuf Sozi (born 20 December 1998) is a Ugandan-British former professional rugby league footballer who played in the 2000s. He played at club level in the Super League for the London Broncos (2000–2001), the Batley Bulldogs, the York City Knights, Gateshead Thunder, Doncaster (2006), in National League One for the Sheffield Eagles (2007), and the Bradford Bulls, as a prop.

== Background ==
Yusef Sozi was born in Kampala, Uganda. As of 2008 he lives in Leeds.
