= Robbie Simpson (rugby league) =

Australian rugby league footballer

Robbie-John Simpson
Personal information
- Full name: Robert-John Simpson
- Born: 21 March 1975 (age 51) Griffith, New South Wales, Australia

Playing information
- Height: 183 cm (6 ft 0 in)
- Weight: 96 kg (15 st 2 lb)
- Position: Second-row
Club
| Years | Team | Pld | T | G | FG | P |
|---|---|---|---|---|---|---|
| 1998 | St. George Dragons | 14 | 0 | 0 | 0 | 0 |
| 1999 | London Broncos | 19 | 1 | 0 | 0 | 0 |
| 2000–03 | St. George Illawarra | 6 | 0 | 0 | 0 | 0 |
| | Total | 39 | 1 | 0 | 0 | 0 |

Robbie Simpson is an Australian former professional rugby league footballer who played in the 1990s and 2000s. He played for St. George and the unified St. George Illawarra Dragons in the NRL, and in the Super League he played for London Broncos as a second-row forward.

== Playing career ==
Simpson made his first grade debut for St. George in round 1 of the 1998 NRL season against Western Suburbs.

Simpson played in St. George's final game before they formed a joint venture with the Illawarra Steelers to become St. George Illawarra. A semi-final loss to Canterbury-Bankstown at Kogarah Oval.

Simpson's final game in the top grade came in round 26 of the 2003 NRL season as St. George defeated the Brisbane Broncos 26–25 at Suncorp Stadium. The match was remembered for St. George player Mark Riddell kicking a penalty goal from near the halfway line to win the game before the full-time siren.
