= Olu Iwenofu =

English rugby league footballer

Personal information
- Full name: Olu Iwenofu
- Born: 28 September 1981 (age 44) Lambeth, London, England

Playing information
- Position: Wing
Club
Years	Team	Pld	T	G	FG	P
2000–01	London Broncos	3	0	0	0	0
2002	Huddersfield Giants	1	0	0	0	0
2003	Gateshead Thunder	3	2	0	0	8
2009–11	London Skolars	34	8	0	0	32
	Total	41	10	0	0	40

Olu Iwenofu (born 28 September 1981 in Lambeth, London, England) is an English former professional rugby league footballer who played in the 2000s. He played for London Broncos and London Skolars, as a wing.

He previously played for London Broncos in the Super League.

Olu Iwenofu also competes in Crossfit as a Masters (over 40 years old) Athlete.
