= Justin Dooley =

Australian rugby league footballer

Personal information
- Born: 23 October 1970 (age 55) Maitland, New South Wales, Australia
- Height: 188 cm (6 ft 2 in)
- Weight: 96 kg (15 st 2 lb)

Playing information
- Position: Prop, Second-row
Club
Years	Team	Pld	T	G	FG	P
1990–91	Eastern Suburbs	2	0	0	0	0
1993–96	Western Suburbs	52	2	0	0	8
1997	Hunter Mariners	4	0	0	0	0
1998–99	Sydney City Roosters	27	1	0	0	4
2000–01	London Broncos	55	2	0	0	8
	Total	140	5	0	0	20
- Source: As of 31 May 2019

Justin Dooley (born 23 October 1970) is an Australian former professional rugby league footballer who played in the 1990s and 2000s.

Dooley played as a prop and also in the second-row.

== Background ==
Dooley was born in Maitland, New South Wales, Australia and was educated at St Joseph's College, Hunters Hill.

== Career ==
He played for the Eastern Suburbs, Western Suburbs and the Hunter Mariners in Australia. In the Super League he played for the London Broncos.
