= Wesley Cotton =

English rugby league footballer

Wes Cotton
Personal information
- Full name: Wesley Cotton
- Born: 9 June 1977 (age 47); Wigan, Greater Manchester, England

Playing information
- Height: 5 ft 11 in (1.80 m)
- Weight: 13 st 0 lb (83 kg)
- Position: Stand-off
Club
| Years | Team | Pld | T | G | FG | P |
|---|---|---|---|---|---|---|
| 1997–98 | London Broncos | 12 | 3 | 0 | 0 | 12 |

Wesley Cotton (born 9 June 1977) is an English former professional rugby league footballer.

== Background ==
Cotton was born in Wigan, Greater Manchester, England.

== Career ==
Cotton started his career playing for the Wigan Warriors, and then joined the London Broncos.
