= Giles Thomas =

British actor,

- Born: Wales, United Kingdom
- Occupation: Actor
- Years active: 1992–present

Giles Thomas is a Welsh actor, known for his portrayal of Doug in E4's series Skins. He also played Private Francis in Dennis Potter's Lipstick on Your Collar.

== Filmography ==
=== Film ===
| Year | Title | Role | Notes |
|---|---|---|---|
| 1992 | Waterland | RAF Officer | |
| 1996 | Seasick | Lew Melick | |
| 1999 | Human Traffic | Martin | |

=== Television ===
| Year | Title | Role | Notes |
|---|---|---|---|
| 1993 | Lipstick on Your Collar | Private Francis | |
| 1994 | Once Upon a Time in the North | Dewi | Series |
| 1996 | Bugs | Hawk | 2 Seasons |
| 2001 | Holby City | Jay Byers | 8 episodes |
| 2004 | Heartbeat | Taffy Evans | |
| 2004 | Doctors | Rob Maystock | |
| 2006 | The Story of Tracy Beaker | Mr. Lucre | |
| 2009 | Casualty | Mark Borham | |
| 2011 | Being Human | Custody Sergeant | |
| 2007-2012 | Skins | Doug Cyhoeddus-Gwalchmai | 4 series |
