= Rob Smyth =

Ireland international rugby league footballer

Personal information
- Full name: Robert John Smyth
- Born: 22 February 1977 (age 49) Wigan, Greater Manchester, England
- Height: 5 ft 10 in (1.78 m)
- Weight: 15 st 8 lb (99 kg)

Playing information
- Position: Wing
Club
Years	Team	Pld	T	G	FG	P
1995–98	Wigan	33	24	0	0	96
1998–00	London Broncos	37	10	28	0	96
2000–03	Warrington Wolves	72	38	27	0	206
2004	Chorley Lynx	7	1	8	0	20
2004–07	Leigh Centurions	40	12	19	0	86
	Total	189	85	82	0	504
Representative
Years	Team	Pld	T	G	FG	P
1999–03	Ireland	5	1	0	0	4

Robert John Smyth (born 22 February 1977) is an English rugby league footballer who played as a winger. He played at club level for Wigan, London Broncos, Warrington Wolves and Leigh Centurions in the Super League, and also represented Ireland at international level.

== Career ==
Smyth started his career with Wigan before moving to London Broncos in 1998. While playing at London Broncos, Smyth kicked two conversions at Wembley in the 1999 Challenge Cup Final defeat by Leeds Rhinos.

In July 2000, Smyth joined Warrington Wolves on a one-month loan deal. He scored four tries on his debut against Huddersfield-Sheffield Giants. He joined Warrington on a permanent deal at the end of the season.

Smyth was an Ireland international.

Following retirement from the sport Smyth took a career in the construction industry as a Project Manager. He currently works for Truline Construction & Interior Services Ltd in Wigan.
