= Ady Spencer =

English rugby league footballer

Personal information
- Full name: Adrian Paul Spencer
- Born: 3 March 1973 (age 53) Warrington, Cheshire, England

Playing information
- Position: Stand-off
Club
Years	Team	Pld	T	G	FG	P
1994	London Crusaders	5
1996–99	London Broncos	58
	London Skolars
	Total	63	0	0	0	0

Ady Spencer is a former professional rugby league footballer. He made history at University as the first player to win full Cambridge blues in both Rugby Union and Rugby League. He was regarded as the instrumental Cambridge player in the period of dominance over the Rugby League Dark Blues in the mid-1990s. He also played for Great Britain U19s in Rugby League before going up to Cambridge.

Ady Spencer's position of choice was as a stand-off and he often appeared from the interchange bench.

== Background ==
Spencer was born in Warrington, Cheshire, England.

== Career ==
Ady Spencer became the focus of national controversy when he was banned by the Rugby Football Union in 1994 for his appearance in the 1994 Rugby Union Varsity match having already played Rugby League at a professional level (albeit unpaid) with the London Crusaders. This was the subject of an Early Day Motion in the UK Parliament at Westminster . Rugby Union was professionalised several months later after a high-profile campaign by MP's and media to highlight the case.

He made 58 appearances for the London Broncos in the Super League 1996–1999. He also played for the London Crusaders and the London Skolars.

From 2008 to 2010, he worked for the Rugby Football League in a Commercial role in London. He is now the Vice President of Business Development for Southern Chemical Corporation, based in Houston, Texas.
