= Peter Gill (rugby league) =

Australian rugby league footballer

Personal information
- Full name: Peter Timothy Gill
- Born: 14 December 1964 (age 61) Brisbane, Queensland, Australia

Playing information
- Position: Lock, Five-eighth, Second-row
Club
Years	Team	Pld	T	G	FG	P
19??–8?	Brothers
1988–91	St. George Dragons	71	11	0	0	44
1992–95	Gold Coast	67	9	0	0	36
1995–99	London Broncos	115	25	0	0	100
	Total	253	45	0	0	180

Peter Gill (born 14 December 1964) is an Australian former professional rugby league footballer who played in the 1980s and 1990s.

== Playing career ==
Gill's position of choice was as a lock and he could also operate at five-eighth.

Gill played for BRL club Brothers, NSWRL sides the St. George Dragons for four seasons between 1988-1991 and the Gold Coast Chargers. In the Super League he played for the London Broncos between 1995 and 1999, and appeared in the 1999 Challenge Cup Final defeat against the Leeds Rhinos.

== Accolades ==
He was awarded the player of the series in the 1988 Panasonic Cup while playing with the St. George Dragons and in 1996 he was named in the Super League Dream Team. In 1997 he was again named in the Super League Dream Team.
