= Chris Ryan (rugby league) =

Australian rugby league footballer

Personal information
- Full name: Christopher Ryan
- Born: 3 January 1973 (age 52)

Playing information
- Position: Centre, Wing
Club
Years	Team	Pld	T	G	FG	P
1992–94	Manly Sea Eagles	26	12	0	0	48
1995–97	Perth Reds	58	21	63	0	210
1998–99	London Broncos	49	17	10	0	88
	Total	133	50	73	0	346

Chris Ryan (born 3 January 1973) is a former professional rugby league footballer who played in the 1990s. Ryan's position of choice was as a Centre or on the Wing. He played for the Manly-Warringah Sea Eagles and the Western Reds/Perth Reds in Australia. In the Super League he played for the London Broncos.

== Career ==
He made his first grade debut for Manly-Warringah in round 9 1992 against Canterbury-Bankstown which finished in a 20–20 draw at Brookvale Oval. Ryan played in Manly's finals campaigns in 1993 and 1994 which both ended in defeat by the Brisbane Broncos.

In 1995, Ryan joined the newly admitted Western Reds franchise. He played in the club's first ever match which was against St. George which the Western Reds won 28–16 at the WACA Ground. Ryan finished the 1995 season as the club's top point scorer. In 1997, the Western Reds joined the rival Super League competition during the Super League war and changed their name to the Perth Reds. Ryan played in the club's final ever game which came against the Canberra Raiders at the WACA and ended in a 36–16 loss.

After the club was liquidated, Ryan finished his career in the Super League with the London Broncos.
