= Tony Currie (rugby league) =

Australia international rugby league footballer and coach

Personal information
- Full name: Tony Maxwell Currie
- Born: 25 December 1962 (age 63) Townsville, Queensland, Australia

Playing information
- Position: Centre, Fullback, Wing
Club
| Years | Team | Pld | T | G | FG | P |
|---|---|---|---|---|---|---|
| | Wests (Brisbane) |
| | Redcliffe |
| 1984–85 | Leeds | 64 | 35 | 0 | 0 | 140 |
| 1986–88 | Canterbury-Bankstown | 39 | 14 | 0 | 0 | 56 |
| 1989–92 | Brisbane Broncos | 38 | 13 | 0 | 0 | 52 |
| | Total | 141 | 62 | 0 | 0 | 248 |
Representative
| Years | Team | Pld | T | G | FG | P |
| 1982–89 | Queensland | 15 | 3 | 0 | 0 | 12 |
| 1988–89 | Australia | 7 | 2 | 0 | 0 | 8 |

Coaching information
Club
| Years | Team | Gms | W | D | L | W% |
| 1996–98 | London Broncos |

Tony Currie (born 25 December 1962) is an Australian former professional rugby league footballer who played in the 1980s and 1990s. He is of Aboriginal descent and played for the Australian side, State of Origin for Queensland. At club level he played for the Brisbane Broncos, and the Canterbury-Bankstown Bulldogs in Australia, appearing in premiership-winning sides for both teams, as well as Leeds in England.

== Playing career ==
In 1982, while playing with Western Suburbs, Currie won the Brisbane Rugby League premiership's Rothmans Medal. On 20 July 1988 Currie played for Australia in their record 62-point win over Papua New Guinea, scoring a try. Currie helped the Canterbury-Bankstown Bulldogs win the 1988 Grand Final against the Balmain Tigers. He also played in the Brisbane Broncos first grand final in 1992, helping them to claim their maiden premiership. In the weeks following the grand final Currie travelled with the Broncos to England, where he played from the interchange bench in the 1992 World Club Challenge against British champions Wigan, helping Brisbane become the first NSWRL club to win the match in Britain.

== Post playing ==
Currie later coached the Super League club, the London Broncos between 1996 and 1998. He was President of the Wests Panthers club for a number of years.
