= Rob Jackson (rugby league) =

English rugby league footballer

Personal information
- Full name: Robert Jackson
- Born: 4 September 1981 (age 44) Salford, Greater Manchester, England

Playing information
- Position: Wing, Centre
Club
Years	Team	Pld	T	G	FG	P
2002–04	London Broncos	44	11	0	0	44
2002(loan)	→ Whitehaven	4	3	0	0	12
2005	Leigh Centurions	26	6	0	0	24
2006–10	Whitehaven RLFC	110	37	0	0	148
	Total	184	57	0	0	228
- Source: As of 3 July 2026

Rob Jackson (born 4 September 1981) is a former English professional rugby league footballer. He played for Whitehaven in National League One, usually as a centre, but also as a wing.

== Background ==
Jackson was born in Salford, Greater Manchester, England.

== Playing career ==
He played for the London Broncos and the Leigh Centurions in the Super League after coming through the Wigan Warriors Academy.
