= Brett Warton =

Australian rugby league footballer

Personal information
- Born: 4 June 1975 (age 51) Brisbane, Queensland, Australia

Playing information
- Position: Fullback, Wing
Club
Years	Team	Pld	T	G	FG	P
1998	Western Suburbs	11	2	13	0	34
1999–01	London Broncos	63	14	154	0	364
	Total	74	16	167	0	398

Brett Warton (born 4 June 1975) is an Australian former professional rugby league footballer who played in the 1990s and 2000s for the Western Suburbs Magpies in the National Rugby League (NRL) and the London Broncos in the English Super League. His preferred position was fullback.

== Background ==
Brett Warton was born in Brisbane, Queensland, Australia.
