= Scott Cram =

Scotland international rugby league footballer

Personal information
- Born: 30 January 1977 (age 49) Wollongong, New South Wales, Australia
- Height: 190 cm (6 ft 3 in)
- Weight: 106 kg (16 st 10 lb)

Playing information
- Position: Prop, Second-row
Club
Years	Team	Pld	T	G	FG	P
1997–98	Illawarra Steelers	40	2	0	0	8
1999–02	London Broncos	72	5	0	0	20
	Total	112	7	0	0	28
Representative
Years	Team	Pld	T	G	FG	P
2000	Scotland	6	0	0	0	0

Scott Cram (born 30 January 1977) is a former Scotland international rugby league footballer who played as a forward in the 1990s and 2000s. A Scotland international representative forward, he played his club football in Australasia's National Rugby League for the Illawarra Steelers, and in the Super League for the London Broncos.

== Background ==
Cram was born in Wollongong, New South Wales, Australia.

== Playing career ==
Cram was named the 1997 ARL season's rookie of the year. After moving to the United Kingdom he became a Scotland international and represented them at the 2000 Rugby League World Cup.
