= Matt Salter =

English rugby league and union footballer (1976–2026)

- Born: Matthew Salter; 2 December 1976 Greenwich, London, England
- Died: 7 March 2026 (aged 49)
- Height: 6 ft 4 in (1.93 m)
- Weight: 16 st 5 lb (104 kg)
- School: Clifton College

Rugby union career
- Position(s): Flanker, second row
Senior career
Years	Team	Apps	(Points)
1995–1996	Blackheath		
1998–1999	West Hartlepool		
2000–2003	Bristol Shoguns	72	(10)
2003–2004	Leeds Tykes	17	(5)
2004–2009	Bristol	78	(30)
Coaching career
- Years: Team
- 2009–2013: Bristol (academy)
- Rugby league career

Playing information
- Position: Second-row
Club
Years	Team	Pld	T	G	FG	P
1997–1999	London Broncos	57				0

Matthew Salter (2 December 1976 – 7 March 2026) was an English rugby union and professional rugby league footballer who played in the 1990s and 2000s. He was educated at St Dunstan's College in London. He played for Bristol in the Guinness Premiership. He primarily played as a Flanker or in the Second Row.

== Rugby career ==
Salter started his career playing for London & South East Schools, and appeared in the back row for England Schools 18 Group A against New Zealand. He played in National League 2 South for Blackheath in the 1995–96 season, making his début in the second row against London Irish.

He went on to play rugby league and appeared for Great Britain Under-19s against New Zealand. Salter played for the London Broncos in the Super League, and was in the starting line-up (as a prop) for them in the 1999 Rugby League Challenge Cup Final, led out by the club backer at the time, Richard Branson. Although the London Broncos started well, the greater experience of the Leeds Rhinos eventually resulted in a record 52–16 victory for the Leeds Rhinos.

His Bristol career started in the autumn of 1999. Salter captained Bristol Rugby for four consecutive seasons from 2004 to 2008. He was named as captain of the Guinness Premiership Dream Team in 2006. He played for the club from 1999 until 2009 with just one season away with Leeds.

== Post–playing career ==
Following his retirement from professional rugby, Salter coached the academy team at Bristol between 2009 and 2011. He later became the Head Coach at Clifton Rugby and the Director of Rugby at Clifton College.

== Death ==
On 7 March 2026, it was announced that Salter had died at the age of 49.
