= Nigel Roy =

Australian rugby league footballer

Personal information
- Born: 15 March 1974 (age 52) Lismore, New South Wales, Australia
- Height: 183 cm (6 ft 0 in)
- Weight: 93 kg (14 st 9 lb)

Playing information
- Position: Wing, Centre, Fullback
Club
Years	Team	Pld	T	G	FG	P
1993–94	Illawarra Steelers	27	10	0	0	40
1995–99	North Sydney Bears	117	35	0	0	140
2000	Northern Eagles	13	7	0	0	28
2001–04	London Broncos	108	43	0	0	156
	Total	265	95	0	0	364

Nigel Roy is an Australian former professional rugby league footballer who played as a wing, fullback and in the centres in the 1990s and 2000s.

He played for Illawarra, North Sydney, Northern Eagles and the London Broncos.

== Early life ==
Roy was born 15 March 1974 in Lismore, New South Wales, Australia.

He commenced his football playing in the junior teams in Kyogle.

== Playing career ==
Roy made his first grade debut for Illawarra in round 10 1993 against Cronulla-Sutherland at WIN Stadium which ended in a 30–0 victory. Roy departed Illawarra at the end of 1994 and signed with North Sydney.

While at the North Sydney Bears, Roy played finals in 4 out of 5 seasons at the club and was a member of the Norths side which made consecutive preliminary finals in 1996 & 1997.

In 2000, North Sydney merged with arch rivals Manly-Warringah to form the Northern Eagles. Roy was one of the few players from Norths signed on to play for the new team.

In the 2001 season, Roy joined London Broncos and in 2002 extended his contract with the club until the end of 2004 when he retired.
