= Robbie Beazley =

Australian rugby league player

Personal information
- Full name: Robert Beazley
- Born: 18 March 1974 (age 52) Dubbo, New South Wales, Australia

Playing information
- Position: Hooker
Club
| Years | Team | Pld | T | G | FG | P |
|---|---|---|---|---|---|---|
| 1997–00 | London Broncos | 84 | 18 | 0 | 1 | 73 |
Representative
| Years | Team | Pld | T | G | FG | P |
| 1992 | Australian Schoolboys |

Robbie Beazley (born 18 March 1974) is an Australian former professional rugby league footballer. His position of choice was as a hooker.

== Background ==
Beazley was born in Dubbo, New South Wales, Australia.

While attending Dubbo South High School, Beazley played for the Australian Schoolboys team in 1992.

== Playing career ==
He played for the Penrith Panthers and Illawarra Steelers in Australia and London Broncos in the Super League.
