= Greg Fleming (rugby league) =

Australian rugby league footballer (born 1973)

Personal information
- Full name: Gregory John Fleming
- Born: 29 January 1973 (age 53) Newcastle, New South Wales, Australia

Playing information
- Height: 180 cm (5 ft 11 in)
- Weight: 89 kg (14 st 0 lb)
- Position: Centre, Fullback
Club
| Years | Team | Pld | T | G | FG | P |
|---|---|---|---|---|---|---|
| 1995–97 | Western Reds | 55 | 16 | 0 | 0 | 64 |
| 1998 | Canterbury Bulldogs | 16 | 7 | 0 | 0 | 28 |
| 1999–01 | London Broncos | 65 | 40 | 2 | 0 | 164 |
| | Total | 136 | 63 | 2 | 0 | 256 |

Greg Fleming (born 29 January 1973 in Newcastle, New South Wales) is an Australian former professional rugby league footballer who played in the 1990s and 2000s. His position of choice was as a fullback or centre.

He played for Perth Reds and Canterbury-Bankstown Bulldogs in the National Rugby League. In the Super League he played for London Broncos.
