= Glen Air =

Australian rugby league footballer

Personal information
- Born: 17 November 1975 (age 50) Bulli, New South Wales, Australia

Playing information
- Height: 176 cm (5 ft 9 in)
- Weight: 79 kg (12 st 6 lb)
- Position: Halfback, Five-eighth, Hooker
Club
Years	Team	Pld	T	G	FG	P
1994–97	Illawarra Steelers	44	12	2	0	52
1998–01	London Broncos	71	27	0	1	109
2002	Wests Tigers	1	0	0	0	0
	Total	116	39	2	1	161

Glen Air (born 17 November 1975 in Bulli, New South Wales) is an Australian former rugby league footballer who played in the 1990s and 2000s. His usual position was as at halfback and he could also operate at five-eighth.

He attended Bulli High School in New South Wales and from there represented Australia at schoolboy level in 1991. Air went on to play for the Illawarra Steelers and the Wests Tigers in Australia. In the Super League he played for the London Broncos.
