= Tulsen Tollett =

GB international rugby league & union footballer and broadcaster

Personal information
- Full name: Tulsen Paul Tollett
- Born: 6 May 1973 (age 53) Hastings, Sussex, England

Playing information
- Height: 178 cm (5 ft 10 in)
- Weight: 85 kg (13 st 5 lb)

Rugby league
- Position: Scrum-half, Stand-off, Centre, Wing, Fullback
Club
Years	Team	Pld	T	G	FG	P
1992	Penrith Panthers	9	0	0	0	0
1993–95	Parramatta Eels	39	5	0	1	21
1996–01	London Broncos	122	41	55	1	275
	Total	170	46	55	2	296
Representative
Years	Team	Pld	T	G	FG	P
1996–97	Great Britain	5	1	0	0	4

Rugby union
Club
Years	Team	Pld	T	G	FG	P
1997–98	Harlequins	17	2	0	0	8
1999–00	London Welsh	9	1	0	0	4
	Total	26	3	0	0	12

Tulsen Paul Tollett (born 6 May 1973) is a television presenter and former professional rugby league footballer who played in the 1990s and 2000s. A Great Britain international representative utility back, he played in Australia for Sydney's Penrith Panthers and the Parramatta Eels clubs, before moving to England and playing for the London Broncos.

== Background ==
Tollett was born in Hastings, Sussex in the United Kingdom, but moved with his family to Australia as a youngster. His junior career was with Emu Plains JRLC prior to being signed by Penrith.

== Rugby league career ==
Tollett played at the Penrith Panthers and the Parramatta Eels before joining the Broncos for the 1996 inaugural season of Super League I. He played his junior football for Emu Plains.

After a successful first season in England, he was selected for the Great Britain squad to tour Papua New Guinea, Fiji and New Zealand.

Tollett's highlights with the Broncos include:

- Playing in the side that beat top Australian side Canberra Raiders in Super League's World Club Championship series in 1997 (London Broncos chalked up a rare win by a Super League side against their Australasian Super League counterparts in that year's competition)
- Being part of the first London Broncos side to reach a Rugby League Challenge Cup final, in 1999 against the Leeds Rhinos at Wembley
- Being in the highest finishing London side (second, Super League 1997) in the club's (Fulham, London Crusaders, Broncos) history to date

== Rugby union career ==
Tollett also had spells in rugby union with English Premiership side Harlequins during 1997/98, as well as London Welsh in 1999/2000 during the Rugby League close season.

== Media work ==
Tollett was forced to give up playing in 2001 due to a persistent shoulder injury. He then moved into the media and now presents sport on BBC News in the UK and internationally. Previous to this he worked for ABC News and ABC NewsRadio in Sydney and has also worked for BBC Radio 5 Live, Sky Sports, Eurosport and Setanta Sports amongst others as a presenter, reporter or commentator, and worked as a pitchside reporter for TVH, the host broadcaster at the 2007 Rugby World Cup in France.

In 2021, Tollett was a commentator for Channel 4's coverage of the 2020 Paralympics.

== Personal life ==
Tollett holds a Bachelor of Physical Education teaching degree, as well as a first dan karate black belt. His son Cillian Tollett is a professional footballer.
