= Steele Retchless =

US international rugby league footballer

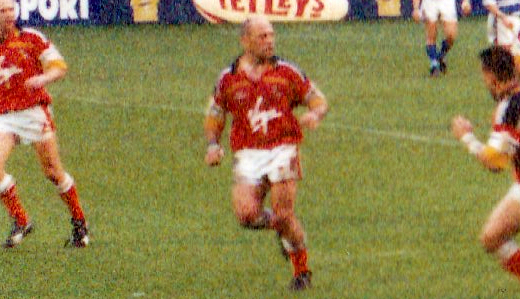

Personal information
- Full name: Steele Andrew Retchless
- Born: 16 June 1971 (age 54) Brisbane, Queensland, Australia

Playing information
- Height: 178 cm (5 ft 10 in)
- Weight: 98 kg (15 st 6 lb)
- Position: Second-row, Prop
Club
Years	Team	Pld	T	G	FG	P
1995–96	Brisbane Broncos	11	1	0	0	4
1997	South Qld Crushers	22	3	0	0	12
1998–04	London Broncos	201	17	0	0	68
	Total	234	21	0	0	84
Representative
Years	Team	Pld	T	G	FG	P
2000–06	United States	3	3	0	0	12

Steele Retchless (born 16 June 1971) is a former United States international rugby league footballer who played as a second-row and prop forward in the 1990s, and 2000s. He played for the Brisbane Broncos and the South Queensland Crushers in the ARL Premiership and the London Broncos in the European Super League. He also played for the Ipswich Jets and Easts Tigers in the Queensland Cup.

== Background ==
Steele Retchless is the son of former Brisbane Rugby League player Mick Retchless.

== Playing career ==
=== Early years ===
He played his junior football for Fortitude Valley Diehards and made his senior début for the club in 1991. In 1993, Retchless switched to Wests Panthers contesting successive finals and winning the Brisbane Rugby League premiership in his first year at the club.

Retchless joined first grade Australian Rugby League premiership side the Brisbane Broncos in 1995. During a two-year contract he made 11 appearances. In 1997, Retchless moved to the South Queensland Crushers and participated in 22 matches. The Crushers picked up a second successive wooden spoon and folded at the end of the season.

=== London Broncos ===
The collapse of the Crushers presented an opportunity to play in Britain's Super League for the London Broncos. During seven seasons at the club, Retchless set a club record number of appearances. In 1998 against Bradford Bulls, he made a Super League record of 66 tackles in a game. That season he was named in 1998's Super League III Dream Team.

In 1999, Retchless scored a memorable last minute try in the Challenge Cup semi-final to earn the London Broncos a place in their first ever final. In his final season at the club, 2004, Retchless was awarded Player of the Year.

=== Post-Broncos career and retirement ===
After his time in London, Retchless returned to Australia to play in the Queensland Wizard Cup for Ipswich Jets in 2005. After finishing that season as a leading contender for the Qantas Player of the Year, Retchless played a season for Easts Tigers in 2006. Easts made the finals but were subsequently beaten by Redcliffe in the major Semi-Final, with Redcliffe going on to win the premiership. Retchless won the Player of the Year award for Easts Tigers and also Best Forward in his final season.

Retchless played his last game for Easts Tigers in a Queensland Wizard Cup preliminary final defeat by the Redcliffe Dolphins in 2006.

Retchless is currently on the coaching staff at Easts Tigers alongside former International Darren Smith.

== Personal life ==
He is the father to 2 boys and 1 girl.

== Career highlights ==
- Junior Clubs: Fortitude Valley Diehards
- Senior Clubs: Fortitude Valley Diehards, Western Suburbs Panthers, Brisbane Broncos, South Queensland Crushers, London Broncos, Ipswich Jets, Eastern Suburbs Tigers
- First Grade Stats: 143 career games in QLD Comp (Approx.) 235 career games in ARL & English Super League scoring 21 tries, including a club record 202 games for London Broncos.
- Most tackles made in any Super League Match: 66 by Steele Retchless (against Bradford in 1998. This was all-time Super League record). – since beaten by Morgan Smithies

== Representative games ==
Retchless qualified to play for the USA Tomahawks through his grandfather, Stuart Beck, who was raised in Iowa, and his mother, who was born in Washington, D.C. Beck arrived in Australia from the United States, captaining his adopted homeland in the sport of baseball.
