= Mat Toshack =

Australian rugby league footballer

Personal information
- Full name: Matthew Toshack
- Born: 18 February 1973 (age 53) Sydney, New South Wales, Australia

Playing information
- Height: 6 ft 0 in (1.83 m)
- Weight: 14 st 7 lb (92 kg)
- Position: Centre, Lock
Club
Years	Team	Pld	T	G	FG	P
1992–96	North Sydney	55	18	0	0	72
1997	South Qld Crushers	19	5	0	0	20
1998–04	London Broncos	155	31	8	0	124
	Total	229	54	8	0	216

Mat Toshack (born 18 February 1973 in Sydney, New South Wales) is an Australian former professional rugby league footballer who played in the 1990s, and 2000s. Toshack's position of choice was as a second-row or centre.

Toshack played for the North Sydney Bears and South Queensland Crushers in the Australia. In the Super League he played for the London Broncos.

== Playing career ==
Toshack made his first grade debut for Norths against Parramatta in Round 21 1992. In 1994, Toshack enjoyed a breakout season as the club finished 2nd on the table and qualified for the finals. Norths defeated defending premiers Brisbane but lost 22-9 against Canberra in the preliminary final.

In 1995, Toshack made 21 appearances as Norths qualified for the finals but were eliminated in the first week against Newcastle. 1996 would be Toshack's last with Norths as the club finished 3rd on the table and reached the preliminary final against St George but fell short of an elusive grand final appearance.

In 1997, Toshack joined South Queensland and played in the club's final ever game, a 39-18 victory over Western Suburbs with Toshack scoring a try in the match. The win was not enough to save South Queensland from the wooden spoon though as the club finished last.

In 1998, Toshack joined English side the London Broncos and played with the club up until the end of 2004 before retiring.

In 2017, North Sydney created a new tournament called the "Matt Toshack Cup" in honor of the former player.
