= 2019 London Broncos season =

Season for London Broncos professional rugby league club in England

- Super League XXIV Rank: 12th - Relegated
- Challenge Cup: Fifth Round
- 2019 record: Wins: 10; draws: 0; losses: 20
- Points scored: For: 521; against: 811

Team information
- Chairman: David Hughes
- Head Coach: Danny Ward
- Captain: Jay Pitts
- Stadium: Trailfinders Sports Ground
- Avg. attendance: 2,021
- High attendance: 3,051 v Leeds Rhinos 01/09/2019

Top scorers
- Tries: Rhys Williams - 13
- Goals: Kieran Dixon - 75
- Points: Kieran Dixon - 190
Home colours	Away colours
← 2018	List of seasons	2020 →

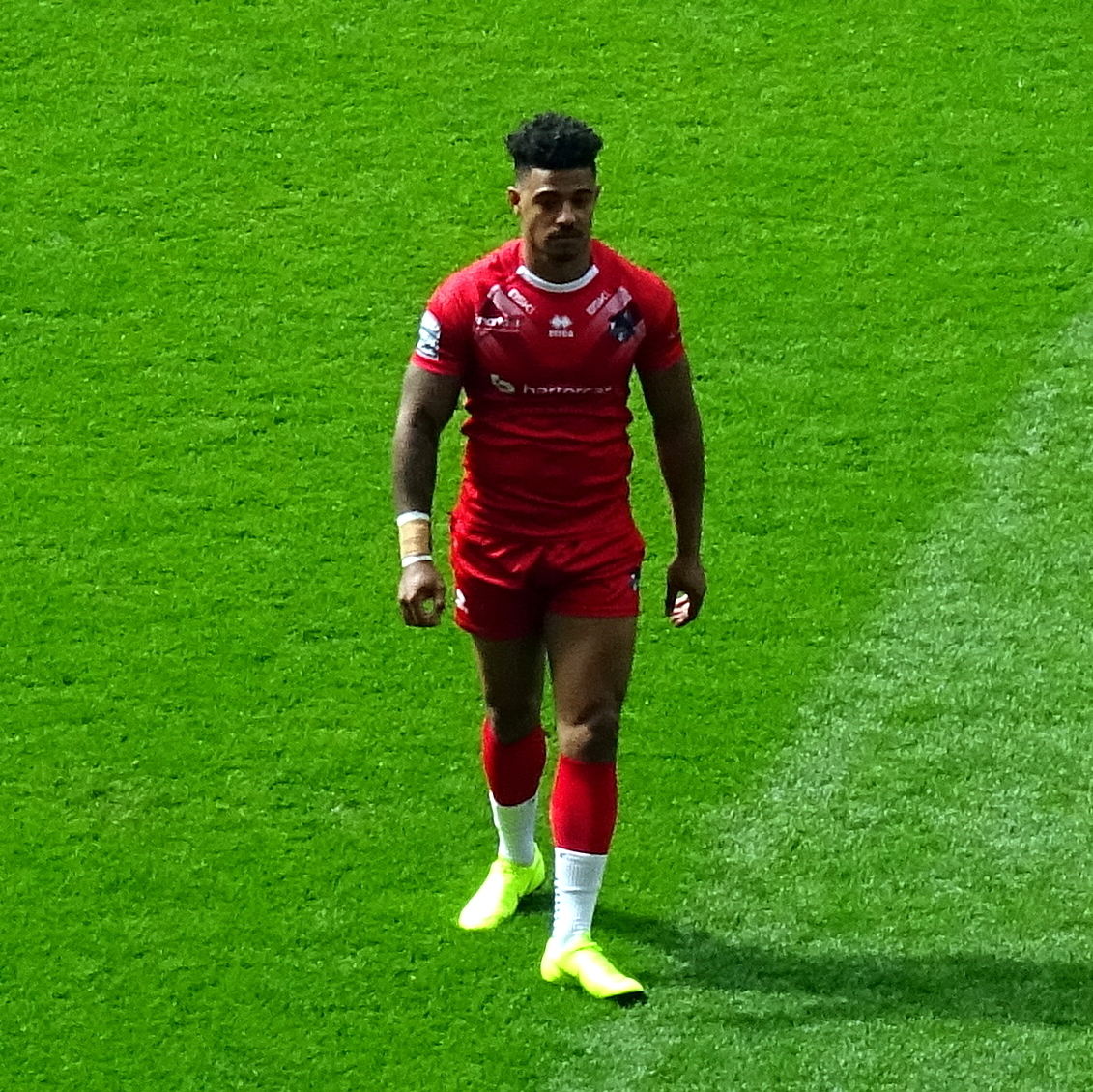
Kieran Dixon, leading points scorer

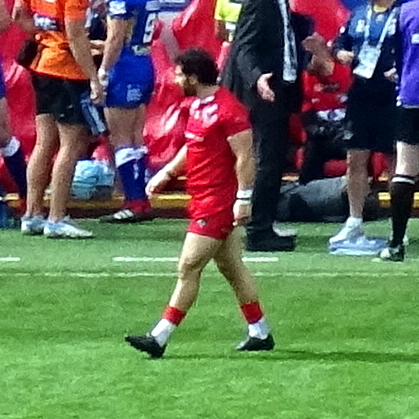
Rhys Williams, leading try scorer

The 2019 London Broncos season was the 40th in the club's history and their first season back in the Super League. Competing in Super League XXIV, the club was coached by Danny Ward, finishing in 12th place and reaching the Fourth Round of the 2019 Challenge Cup. They were relegated on points difference on the final day of the season.

It was their fourth at the Trailfinders Sports Ground, competing in the Super League for the first time since 2014. Danny Ward was assisted by former England and Great Britain international, Jamie Langley for the second consecutive season, and picked Jay Pitts as captain for a second campaign.

== Year review ==
=== January ===
The 2019 Super League fixtures, released in November 2018, scheduled the London Broncos to play host to Wakefield Trinity on the opening weekend of the new season on 3 February. London Broncos were to mark their return to the Dacia Magic Weekend on May 26 with a fixture against Leeds Rhinos.

Morgan Smith joined the London Broncos on a one-year deal from fellow Super League club, Warrington Wolves.

On the field London Broncos ran in eleven tries on the third Sunday of the month in their opening pre-season friendly away at Betfred League 1 club, Doncaster R.L.F.C., winning the contest (64–6). A week later Danny Ward's side completed their preparations ahead of a return to the Super League with a (20–0) victory at Championship club, Leigh Centurions, tries from James Cunningham, Sadiq Adebiyi, Luke Yates and Rhys Williams augmenting a solid defensive display from the southerners.

=== February ===
The month began with London Broncos making their eagerly awaited return to the Super League and a home fixture against Wakefield Trinity. An inauspicious start saw the hosts trail 18–6 after the game's first quarter, Matty Fleming's close range riposte the only score to counter a quick fire three try salvo from the visitors but four point doubles from Rhys Williams and Eddie Battye were added too by tries for Kieran Dixon, Matty Fozard on his London Broncos Super League debut and Elliot Kear as the southern based outfit earned a (42–24) come-from-behind victory.

The Broncos travelled north a week later to play Salford Red Devils in their first away fixture, and despite their defensive efforts the Londoners return south on the wrong end of a (0-24) score line.

Another battling display, on the road at Hull Kingston Rovers the following Sunday is not enough to prevent Danny Ward's men falling to a second defeat of the season (12–22). A converted Matty Gee try in quick response to an early opener for the hosts had the Londoners narrowly ahead at half time, but a hat-trick of four-pointers early in the second stanza from the home side are enough to secure the spoils for Tim Sheens' Robins, despite a late try from Broncos captain Jay Pitts and goal from Kieran Dixon, the latter's 100th for the club.

After successive Sunday road trips the London Broncos returned to Ealing six days later, and a match against much fancied Castleford Tigers in front of the Sky Sports TV cameras. A never-say-die performance from the Broncos on an unseasonably warm late winter Saturday evening ultimately proved fruitless as the West Yorkshiremen reaffirmed their credentials as genuine contenders for the end of season Super League Grand Final, running in seven tries during a scintillating exhibition of fast open rugby to condemn the Londoners to defeat (6-40), the hosts only score coming from leading try-scorer, Rhys Williams early on in the contest.

=== March ===
The first Sunday of the month saw the visit of Super League Champions Wigan Warriors to the Trailfinders Sports Ground.

One afternoon the London Broncos set a new ground attendance record, as 2,586 witnessed an enthralling contest with the Londoners battling back from an early two try deficit to narrowly defeat the 22-time champions (18–16). Four point scores by Eddie Battye and Matty Gee are added too by two conversions from Kieran Dixon to have the home side narrowly in front at the break (12–10), and the latter soon increased the advantage early in the second half with a trademark length of the field effort. The lead stretched to eight as Kieran Dixon then added a penalty, and despite a converted try by former Bronco star Tony Clubb for the visitors, Danny Ward's men held firm for a famous victory to move them up to ninth position in the Super League table.

Preparations for the next fixture, away at St. Helens had been severely disrupted by injuries to key players. Captain, Jay Pitts and on loan St. Helens centre, Ryan Morgan had left the field during the Wigan Warriors victory, and when the squad was announced in midweek, Kieran Dixon, James Cunningham and Nathan Mason were further notable absentees. On a wet and blustery Friday evening in England's northwest, the Broncos battled gamely, and a now trademark defensive display from Danny Ward's men kept the southerners in the contest for long periods, although ultimately could not prevent a (0-26) loss as St. Helens returned to the summit of the early season league ladder.

The following week, the Broncos came from behind to triumph at Leeds Rhinos, and a second (18–16) Super League victory inside a fortnight. The Broncos, buoyed by a return to the starting line-up of skipper, Jay Pitts, James Cunningham and Kieran Dixon led 8–0 at half time, thanks to a try from the captain and four points from the trusty boot of the last-mentioned. The lead was not to last though, and 16 unanswered points for the hosts saw the visitors trailing as the match entered its final six minutes before a dramatic late rally garnered tries for Matty Fozard and Will Lovell, the latter converted by Kieran Dixon, which managed to turn defeat into victory and silence the majority of the 11,000 plus crowd inside the Headingley Stadium.

London Broncos went in search of a fourth league victory of the campaign in their next Super League contest, at home to Hull F.C. On a beautiful early spring Sunday afternoon, and before another respectable crowd of 2,357 the hosts began brightly and finished strongly. Elliot Kear and Éloi Pélissier tries had Danny Ward's troops ahead at the break (14–10), while late four pointers from Jordan Abdull and leading try scorer, Rhys Williams left the visitors hanging on in a frantic finale. However, a slow start to the second stanza extended into a near half hour unproductive spell for the home side with the Black & Whites registering 18 unanswered points, a period that ultimately proved decisive in the final reckoning as the Londoners slipped to a narrow (24–28) reversal.

Well-founded optimism generated from the brave loss to Hull F.C. preceded the next Super League fixture a week later, another home clash, against lowly but improving Huddersfield Giants. The upbeat mood was soon to be displaced after kick-off by the rampant visitors however, who left the Broncos spending the majority of the first half going backwards much as the clocks had done earlier in the day to signal British Summer Time, as the Yorkshiremen registered five tries. The hosts only response had been a 50-metre solo effort from full back, Alex Walker and a try from erstwhile captain, Jay Pitts, the skipper's four pointer just prior to the interval restoring hope amongst the home faithful. This was further reinforced by another long range Rhys Williams score early in the second half, the leading marksmen's fifth try of the campaign, but the away side were soon to extinguish any realistic aspirations of an unlikely comeback and the remainder of the contest saw the teams trade four tries, a Kieran Dixon brace in a season-best-to-date fourteen point personal haul unable to prevent a (26–38) defeat.

=== April ===
On the first evening of the month London Broncos were drawn away to play Betfred Championship club, Halifax R.L.F.C. in Round 5 of the Coral Challenge Cup, with the tie to be played on Thursday 11 April.

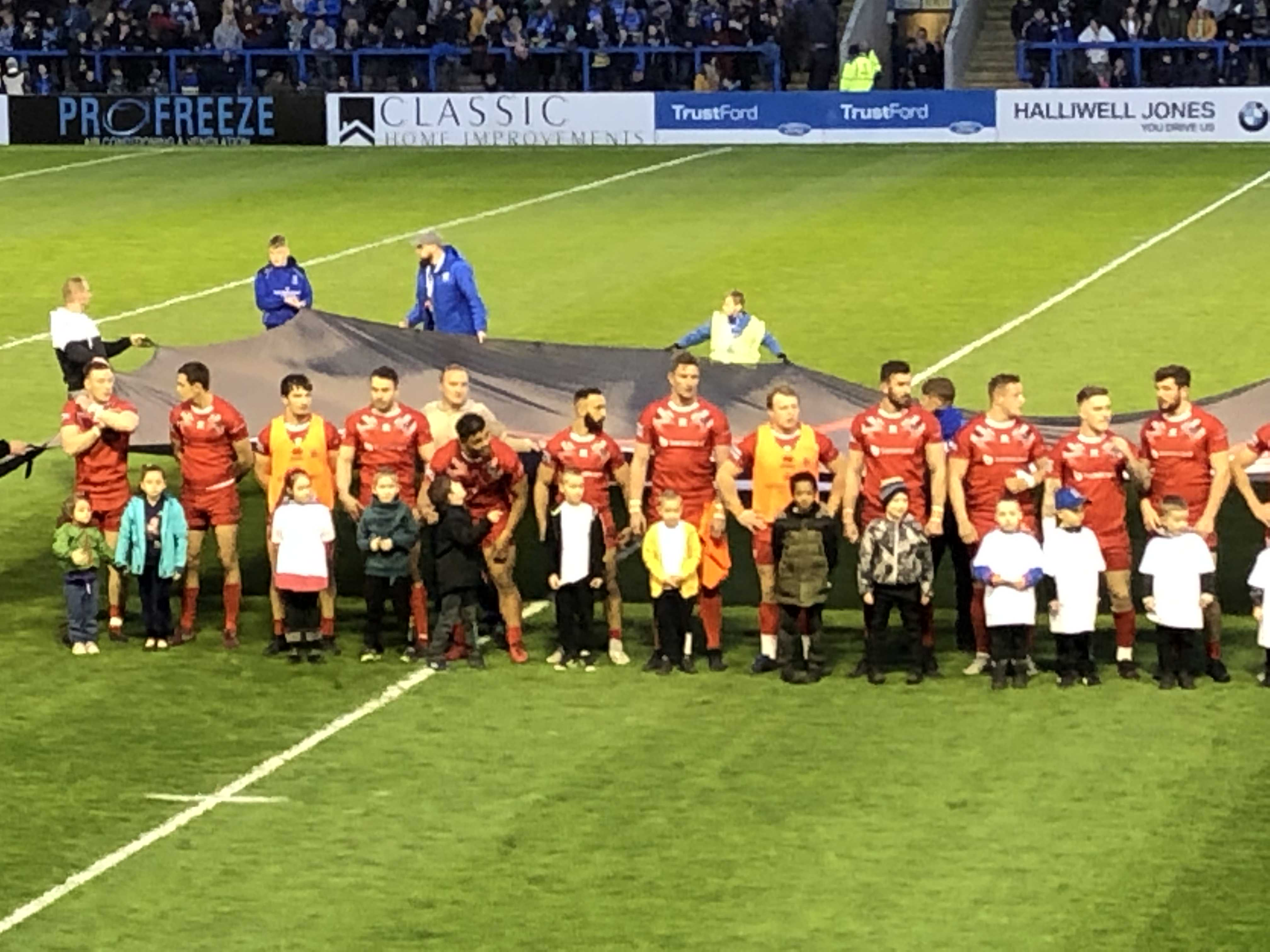
The Broncos lining against the Warrington Wolves at the Halliwell Jones Stadium

London Broncos returned to Super League action on the month's first Friday, with a fixture away at high-flying Warrington Wolves. The much changed Londoners, with local products, James Meadows and Matt Davies making their top-flight debuts began brightly, but crucially failed to turn possession into points during a competitive opening forty minutes, and despite managing to cross the whitewash twice in the second half courtesy of Nathan Mason and Matty Gee, Danny Ward's outfit ultimately fell to a brave (12–48) loss in front of a healthy crowd of 11,718, to leave the Broncos in eleventh position and the Wolves top of the twelve team Super League table.

The London Broncos travelled north again six days later to play Betfred Championship club, Halifax R.L.F.C. in Round 5 of the Coral Challenge Cup. Head coach, Danny Ward decided to rest a number of first team regulars, including Alex Walker, Rhys Williams, Kieran Dixon, Luke Yates and Matty Fozard ahead of the impending busy Easter holiday schedule, and although the Londoners remained competitive throughout, including a try double from 20-year-old winger, Jacob Ogden, his first four-pointers for the club, Wembley aspirations were curtailed for another season as the team returned south on the wrong end of a (16–24) score line.

Catalans Dragons rolled into London town on Maundy Thursday, and the London Broncos were to suffer a fourth Super League defeat in succession. The hosts had begun brightly on a lovely spring evening before a combination of individual errors and a sickening injury to Jordan Abdull severely disrupted their rhythm, and helped contribute to a second half to forget as the Broncos fell to a disappointing (6-39) loss, the only consolation being a Mark Ioane try.

The search for a fourth Super League victory of the campaign continued on Easter Monday with a trip to Huddersfield Giants. The Broncos played their full part in a contest right up until the final hooter, and with the score poised at (19–24) following tries from skipper, Jay Pitts, Rhys Williams, Ryan Morgan and a Morgan Smith field goal, Alex Walker was denied a late potentially match winning under the sticks try by an ever vigilant in-goal touch judge.

London Broncos poor spell extended to the last Saturday of the month with another home defeat, this time at the hands of away day specialists, Salford Red Devils. The visitors, following a Good Friday victory at Warrington Wolves on their last road trip repeated the trick at the Ealing Trailfinders Sports Ground, as they ran in four unanswered tries in a one-sided first half. The Broncos hinted at a comeback in the second forty, scoring first and last, through leading try-scorer Rhys Williams and Matty Fleming, but the damage had long been irreparable as the Broncos were downed (10–30) to remain bottom of the Super League table ahead a trip to champions, Wigan Warriors in front of the Sky Sports cameras on the first Thursday in May.

=== May ===
With the season edging towards its mid-point London Broncos travelled to Wigan Warriors, and in front of a national TV audience acquitted themselves admirably. Man of the match Australian import, Luke Yates completed 62 tackles in the defensive effort, although ultimately a first half try from Jay Pitts, the skipper's fifth of the campaign, and a goal and penalty from the reliable boot of Kieran Dixon were to prove insufficient as the Londoners succumbed to a narrow (8–18) defeat.

Following a mid-season interlude to afford an enthralling weekend of sixth round Challenge Cup action, London Broncos resumed Super League hostilities on the month's middle weekend, playing host to Wakefield Trinity for a second time in 2019.

Buoyed by victory over the West Yorkshiremen on the season's opening day, and looking for a first win in nine, London Broncos impressed during a dominant first half display, notching five tries. Four of these came from the increasingly influential Jordan Abdull, whilst the other was scored by Rhys Williams, the 100th of the Welshmen's prolific career with the Broncos.

The Londoners began the second half in similar vein, and another Rhys Williams four pointer was added to by a Kieran Dixon brace, the second a trademark length of the field effort, scores which were ultimately sufficient to withstand a late four try in five minutes Wakefield Trinity riposte as London Broncos registered two crucial points with a (42–34) victory.

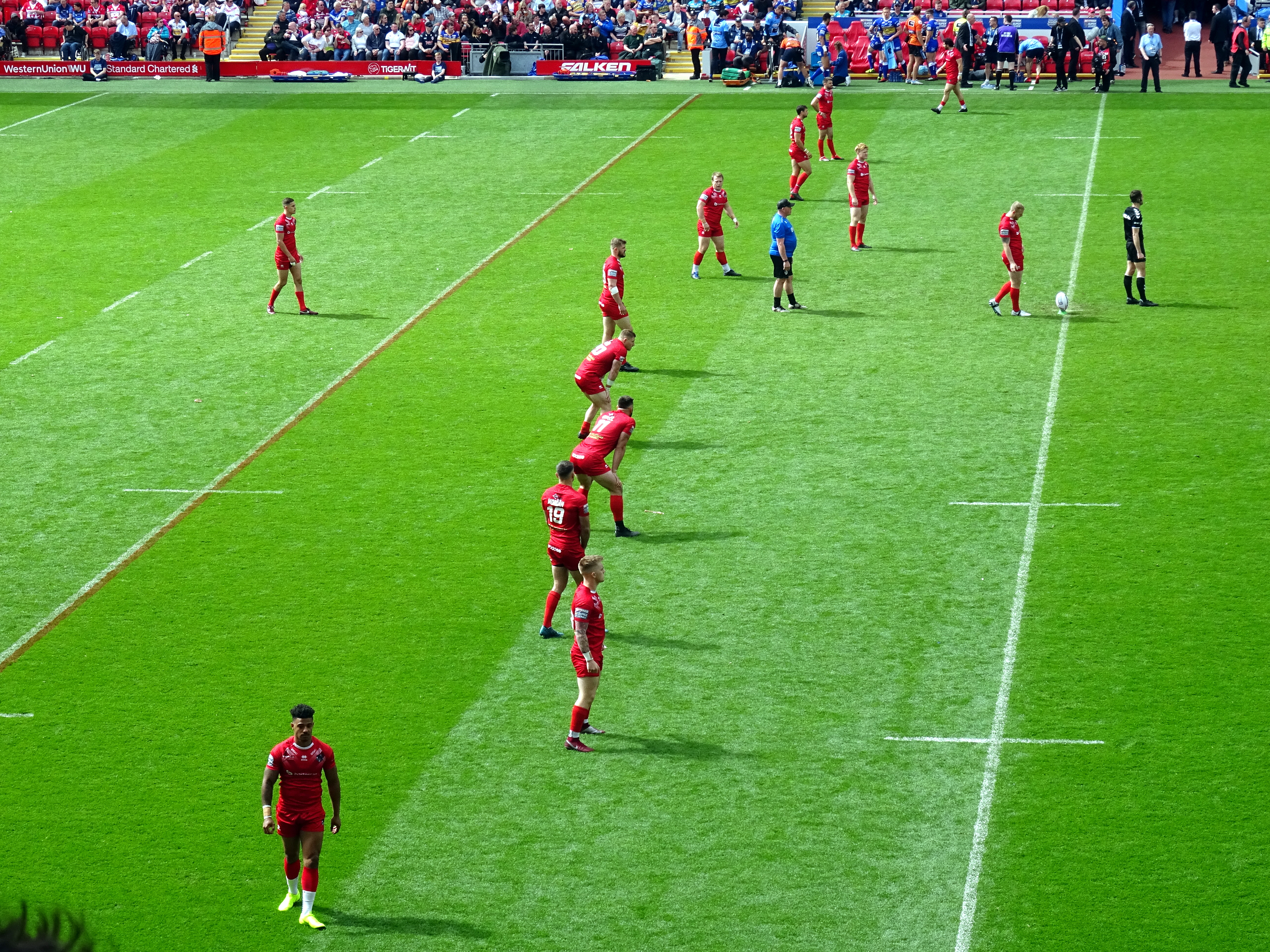
The Broncos in action against the Leeds Rhinos at Anfield

London Broncos headed to Anfield for the Magic Weekend in fine fettle, level on points with fellow strugglers Hull Kingston Rovers and Leeds Rhinos and an intriguing match-up with the latter, who had recently dispensed with the services of coach, David Furner. In the event a slow start to each half was to prove extremely costly for the Londoners as they fell to a narrow (22–24) reversal despite a brace from the in-form Jordan Abdull and further tries from Ryan Morgan and the much sought after Alex Walker.

=== June ===
Following another enforced weekend break to accommodate the Challenge Cup quarter-finals, London Broncos returned to Super League action to entertain long time leaders St. Helens on the month's second Sunday, and a new Trailfinders Sports Ground RL record attendance of 2,801 witnessed history as the Londoners recorded their first-ever golden point extra-time victory.

The portents for the hosts were not good early on as the visitors raced into a (12–0) lead, although converted home scores from on loan St. Helens centre, Ryan Morgan and a fine individual effort by James Cunningham had managed to restore equality by the interval. The away side were to edge ahead again early in the second half with an unconverted try, but a second Ryan Morgan effort and a sixth four-pointer of the season from Jay Pitts, a goal scored by Kieran Dixon looked to have secured an unlikely home victory, only for St. Helens to hit back in the last minute to level the scores at (22-22) apiece through a Regan Grace try and a Danny Richardson conversion off the left-hand touchline.

Two minutes into extra-time a St. Helens error coming away from their own goal line afforded the Southerners an advantageous position, and when the ball was funnelled back to Morgan Smith, he managed to shovel the ball between the sticks for a drop goal.

The following Saturday evening, London Broncos travelled to face third placed Catalans Dragons, looking to secure back-to-back Super League wins for the first time in 2019. Hull Kingston Rovers home win over second-placed Warrington Wolves earlier in the day had once again left the Broncos at the bottom of the table, but this did nothing to deter the capital side from producing a spectacular display of attacking rugby to demolish the French outfit, a Rhys Williams double, taking his tally for the season to eleven, was added to by further scores from Kieran Dixon, Elliot Kear and man of the match Jordan Abdull, enough to see the visitors record (30–12) wins.

The triumph in the south of France lifted the London Broncos competition points tally to twelve and had drawn them back level again with Hull Kingston Rovers and Leeds Rhinos, ahead of a crucial Sky Sports televised fixture against the East Hull side at Ealing's Trailfinders Sports Ground five days later. London Broncos were to dominate the majority of the opening stanza and led 8-0 close to half time, a Morgan Smith try, his first for the club, sandwiched between two penalties from the ever reliable boot of Kieran Dixon. The visitors, under the tutelage of the recently appointed, Tony Smith needed a riposte, and energised by a large travelling contingent, hit a purple patch either side of the interval, scoring three unanswered converted tries to leave the Broncos trailing by ten with little over half an hour left. Hull born Broncos playmaker, Jordan Abdull remained determined to showcase his skills in front of a wider TV audience and kept the hosts in the contest, Alex Walker soon reducing the deficit at the back end of a set which followed a game-changing 40/20 from the former, before the talented stand-off himself was given a benefit of doubt four point score, following a close hand-on-ball first video referee referral. Kieran Dixon added the extras to both scores to nudge the hosts back into a tenuous lead they were not to lose for a second time, a converted 75th minute Rob Butler effort, his first for the club, eventually proving sufficient despite an even later Hull Kingston Rovers' six point score. The final whistle heralded a release of tension and sparked wild celebrations, similar to those of eleven days earlier following the St. Helens home victory, and a third consecutive win (26–24) had hauled London Broncos from the foot of the Super League table for the first time in three months, ahead of a Sunday away trip to play-off chasing Castleford Tigers on the month's last day.

London Broncos winning run came to an abrupt halt in West Yorkshire, as a rampant Castleford Tigers registered forty points against the capital outfit for a second time in 2019, tries from Kieran Dixon, another length-of-the-field sprint, and a 12th of the campaign from leading marksmen, Rhys Williams providing little comfort as the Broncos fell to a disappointing (10–42) reversal, a result which consigned them back to the bottom of the Super League table, albeit level on 14 competition points with Hull Kingston Rovers, Huddersfield Giants, and Leeds Rhinos with nine matches of the regular season remaining.

=== July ===
The first Saturday of the month saw London Broncos play host to second placed Warrington Wolves, and in front of another good crowd (2,357) it was the visitors who were to return to Cheshire with a resounding victory following a six-try first half, a Matty Fozard second half effort ultimately proving to be of scant consolation as the Broncos slid to their sixth home reversal of the campaign (6-36).

London Broncos were back in front of the Sky Sports TV cameras the following Thursday as they travelled north to the KCOM Stadium, home of third in the table, Hull F.C. Injuries were beginning to take their toll on Danny Ward's team, and a much changed line-up saw Kieran Dixon revert to full back in place of Alex Walker, whilst other notable absentees included Ryan Morgan, Morgan Smith, Greg Richards, Nathan Mason and Éloi Pélissier. The changes seemingly had an adverse effect on the capital side in a one-sided first half and London Broncos were staring down the barrel of a heavy defeat as they headed into the sheds at the break on the wrong end of a (0-34) score line. However, a stirring second half performance not only kept their hosts try less, but four point scores from Matty Fleming, Jordan Abdull against his former club, and a late double from Sadiq Adebiyi ensured respectability despite another loss (22–35).

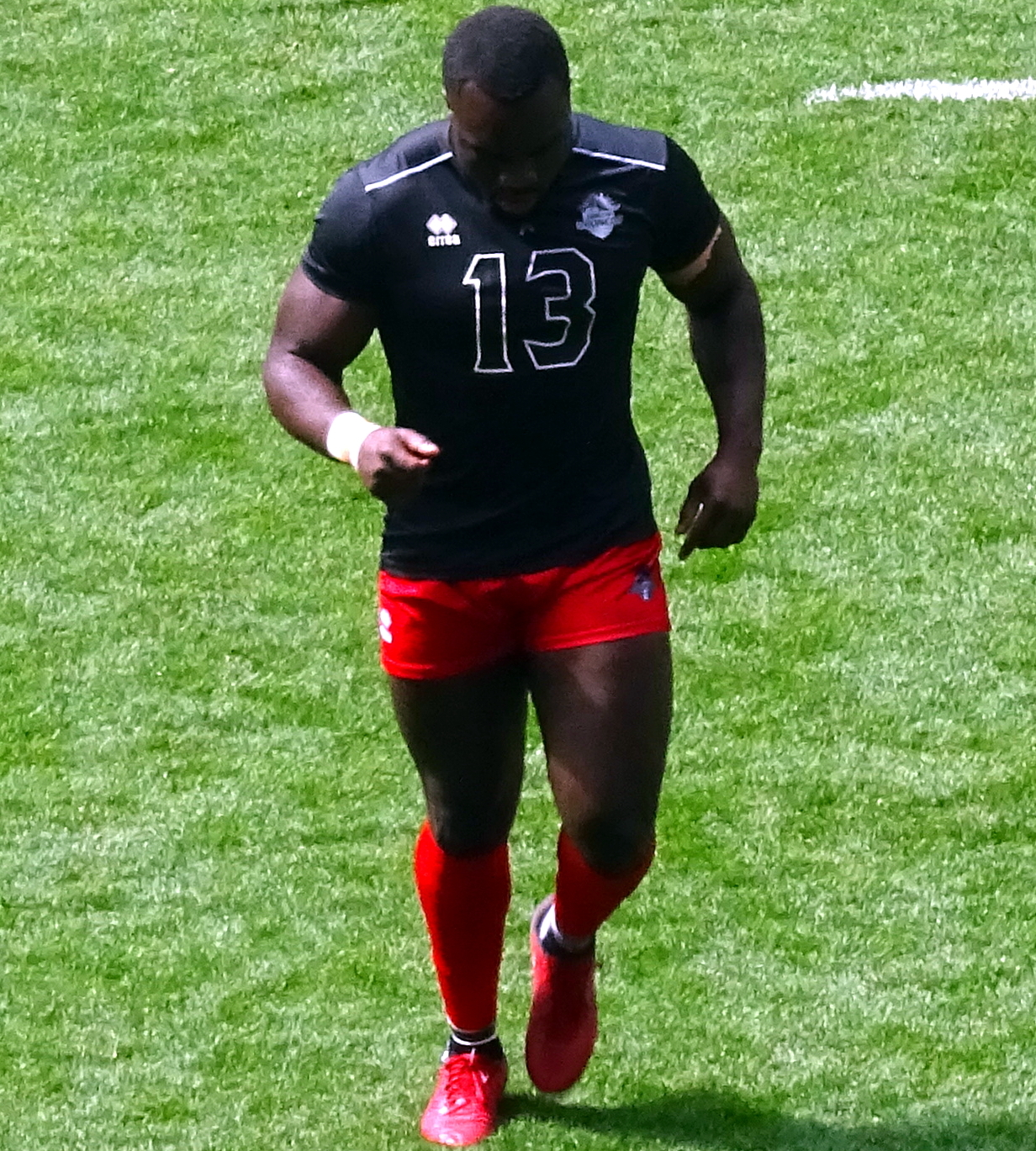
Adebiyi scored a brace of tries away at Hull FC in July

Sat two points adrift of the field despite a number of sterling performances London Broncos needed a lift going into their final seven matches of the campaign, and they found it in unusual circumstances as St. Helens Head Coach, Justin Holbrook revealed in a press conference during the lead up to their Round 23 fixture that he intended to field a virtual second-string side against London Broncos, citing a recent run of demanding matches, and an upcoming Challenge Cup semi-final against Championship club, Halifax R.L.F.C. as mitigating factors.

London Broncos were to take full advantage of the opportunity to register a home double over the league leaders, and a five try display swept them to their biggest victory of the season; a brace from former Saint, Matty Fleming and efforts from Luke Yates, Alex Walker and Matty Gee enough to see the hosts record a (32–12) win over St. Helens.

The two competition points lifted London Broncos tally to 16 and once again brought them level with Hull KR and Leeds Rhinos at the foot of the Super League table, whilst Huddersfield Giants and Wakefield Trinity remained in the mix on 18 as the battle to avoid relegation intensified.

=== August ===
The month began with a second visit of the season of play-off chasing Salford Red Devils to Trailfinders Sports Ground with London Broncos looking to avenge two earlier defeats against the Manchester-based side, and hoping to maintain pressure on the four relegation threatened teams immediately above them in the Super League table.

The ensuing break for the Challenge Cup semi-finals (won by St. Helens and Warrington Wolves) had seen Head Coach, Danny Ward strengthen his squad for the final six matches of the campaign with the recruitment of highly rated former NRL rookie, Brock Lamb. The Australian's debut was not to be one to remember though as the Broncos succumbed to a heavy (28–58) defeat, 36 of those points yielded prior to half time to an impressive Red Devils outfit which effectively ended the game as a contest, the home side's only riposte, a length of the field interception try from Rhys Williams, the Welshman's 13th of the season. To their credit, the Londoners battled gamely in the second half and were rewarded with three further four point scores through Matty Fleming, Sadiq Adebiyi and Rob Butler, but the weekend was to end with London Broncos two points adrift of the field following Hull KR's dramatic (27–26) golden point victory over Castleford Tigers and Leeds Rhinos (44–0) away success at Huddersfield Giants.

The following Saturday evening saw London Broncos return to the Mend-A-Hose-Jungle, home to Castleford Tigers and scene of a heavy Round 20 reversal at the end of June which had ended a season best three match winning streak.

The Broncos were to lose again, although this time the contest was much closer, and they led (6–4) at the break following recent Sydney Roosters signing, Brock Lamb's first try for the club. A resolute defensive effort in the second stanza kept the capital outfit firmly in the game, although the hosts were eventually to score 16 unanswered points, leaving the visitors to return south down the M1 on the wrong end of a (6-20) score line.

London Broncos were on their travels the following weekend too, returning to the south of France seeking another victory over Catalans Dragons nine weeks previous.

Kieran Dixon contributed to the Broncos registered an away league double, racing the length of the field to add to an earlier penalty, and his impressive touchline conversion saw the capital outfit lead (8–0) inside the game's opening ten minutes, an advantage they would maintain until the interval. Catalans Dragons hinted at a comeback soon after the break, crossing for an unconverted try, but a sweeping move orchestrated on the Broncos left hand edge ended with Alex Walker touching down under the sticks, the full-back's fifth try of the campaign, and with Kieran Dixon adding the extras and another penalty for home side indiscretion soon after, the contest was as good as over, confirmed when Brock Lamb slotted a long range drop goal, his first for the club.

The (17–4) win would lift London Broncos back level on 18 points with Hull KR, who lost a crucial four-pointer at home to relegation rivals, Wakefield Trinity and Huddersfield Giants, losers at the John Smith's Stadium to Castleford Tigers with three matches of the regular season remaining.

The following weekend saw Warrington Wolves spring a Challenge Cup surprise with victory over much fancied St. Helens at Wembley, and Sheffield Eagles emerge victorious over Widnes Vikings in an all Championship inaugural 1895 Cup final.

=== September ===
The fortnight interlude had given London Broncos plenty of time to re-energise following their exertions in the heat of the South of France, as they prepared to play host to fellow strugglers, Leeds Rhinos in the final home fixture of the season.

A sunlit first Sunday afternoon of the month, and a season best and Trailfinders Sports Ground rugby league record crowd of 3,051 embraced the players, although it would be the large contingent of travelling fans who ended much the happier, their team scoring three tries in each half to all but secure the Rhinos' Super League status. The Broncos battled gamely as ever, and trailing (0–18) at the break briefly threatened another notable comeback early in the second half, a length of the field effort by speedster, Kieran Dixon following a trademark interception was followed quickly by a fifth try of the campaign by centre, Ryan Morgan to reduce the deficit to eight, but the West Yorkshiremen could not be denied as the Capital outfit ultimately ran out of steam to succumb to a (10–36) defeat.

The loss left the London Broncos two points adrift of the pack after Hull KR and Huddersfield Giants gained unlikely away wins at Catalans Dragons and Hull F.C. respectively, and due to a significant adverse points difference, having to realistically win their remaining two matches to secure their own top flight safety.

London Broncos visited Hull KR the following Friday evening, the match brought forward from Sunday afternoon to accommodate Sky Sports TV coverage, and with their season on the line the team defeated their relegation threatened hosts.

The southerners began the match on the front foot and two quick-fire tries from Matty Gee and Brock Lamb, the latter, whose sublime off the floor pass had set up the former's opener, were twelve points to the good inside the game's opening ten minutes. It was a lead they would hold onto until the interval, despite a converted home try midway through the half. Kieran Dixon had increased the advantage to (14–6) with a penalty just prior to the break, but any thoughts of a comfortable win were soon dispelled as Broncos’ tenuous advantage was wiped out within eleven minutes of the restart as the Robins sought their own safety salvation. Trailing (14–16) and with time fast becoming their enemy, the normally reliable Kieran Dixon missed a kickable penalty albeit from distance, although ultimately it would not prove costly, as with less than three minutes left on the clock and camped under the backdrop of their own sticks, Danny Ward's men exploded upfield thanks to a penetrating run from Aussie, Ryan Morgan, eventually dotting down on the left hand edge through erstwhile skipper, Jay Pitts, on the sixth and last tackle of a set they had to score from to retain any chance of saving themselves from an immediate return to the championship.

Kieran Dixon improved the score and London Broncos held on for a famous (20–16) victory, moving them onto 20 competition points, the same number as Hull KR, Huddersfield Giants, and Wakefield Trinity to whom they would travel a week later for the last game of a riveting season, the fixture brought forward from the Sunday afternoon to the Friday evening, to align with matches involving the other clubs embroiled in the relegation battle, and to accommodate another Sky Sports telecast.

London Broncos emerged from the Mobile Rocket Stadium dressing rooms in the knowledge their fate remained very much in their own hands, and spurred on by an impressive travelling contingent of 250 supporters who had travelled the 184 miles up the M1 motorway on a clear blue sky Friday afternoon. Trailing to an early penalty the southern outfit defended resolutely to remain firmly in the contest, but crucially failed to take advantage of a couple of well worked first half opportunities, and as the balmy night wore on suspicion grew that the match might eventually prove to be a bridge too far for Danny Ward's battlers, a thought reaffirmed soon after 9.30pm as the hooter sounded to signal defeat (10–19), tries by Alex Walker and Brock Lamb coming too late to positively affect the outcome for the Londoners.

The regular season ended with London Broncos level on 20 competition points with year-long rivals, Hull KR, who also lost, at Salford Red Devils, although a decisive 62 on field points differential was ultimately the determining factor that saw the club relinquish their hard earned Super League status gained eleven months previous in the Million Pound Game victory over Toronto Wolfpack.

Wakefield Trinity finished ninth in the table and Huddersfield Giants tenth following a home success over Catalans Dragons.

== Milestones ==
=== January ===
- Ryan Morgan on loan from St. Helens, scored his first try on debut for the London Broncos in the (64–6) away friendly victory at League 1 club, Doncaster R.L.F.C.
- Luke Yates bagged his first try for the club in the (20–0) pre-season victory at Leigh Centurions.

=== February ===
- Eddie Battye played in his first Super League fixture and scored a try double in the Round 1 victory over Wakefield Trinity.
- Rhys Williams claimed his first Super League try for London Broncos as part of a brace in the Round 1 opening day victory over Wakefield Trinity.
- Elliot Kear grabbed his first Super League try for London Broncos in the Round 1 home success against Wakefield Trinity.
- Mark Ioane featured for the first time in Super League during the Round 1 home win versus Wakefield Trinity.
- Luke Yates made his Super League debut in the Round 1 triumph over Wakefield Trinity.
- Will Lovell made his Super League debut in the Round 1 opening day win against Wakefield Trinity.
- Matty Fleming's first points for London Broncos came when crossing the whitewash for the club's opening try of the 2019 season, in the (42–24) Round 1 home victory over Wakefield Trinity.
- Matty Fozard scored his first London Broncos try on his Super League debut for the club, to help the hosts defeat Wakefield Trinity (42–24) on the Sunday of the season's opening weekend.
- Matty Gee made his 50th London Broncos appearance in the Round 2 reversal at former club, Salford Red Devils.
- James Cunningham made his 100th appearance for the London Broncos in the Round 10 away loss to Hull Kingston Rovers.
- Kieran Dixon reached 100 goals for the club when converting the second of two goals in the Round 10 away defeat by Hull Kingston Rovers.
- Matty Gee scored his first Super League try for London Broncos in the Round 10 reversal away at Hull Kingston Rovers.
- Jay Pitts bagged his first Super League four-pointer for London Broncos in the Round 10 away loss at Hull Kingston Rovers.
- Sadiq Adebiyi made his Super League debut in the Round 3 loss to Castleford Tigers.

=== March ===
- London Broncos (18–16) Round 4 victory over Wigan Warriors was their first in the capital against the defending Super League champions since an (18–8) success as Harlequins RL on 2 June 2007 at Twickenham Stoop.
- Rob Butler made his first Super League appearance in the home victory over Wigan Warriors.
- Matt Davis rejoins the London Broncos on a month's loan from fellow Super League club, Warrington Wolves.
- Jacob Ogden made his Super League debut in the Round 5 away loss at St. Helens.
- Matt Davis made his Super League debut in the Round 5 defeat at St. Helens.
- London Broncos (18–16) Round 6 victory over Leeds Rhinos was the capital sides' first victory at Headingley Stadium since a (36–26) triumph on 25 February 2011 (as Harlequins RL).
- Will Lovell bagged his first Super League try in the Round 6 away win at Leeds Rhinos.
- Éloi Pélissier notched his first Super League try in London Broncos colours in the Round 7 home defeat by Hull F.C.
- Jordan Abdull scored his first Super League try for London Broncos in the Round 7 home loss to Hull F.C.
- Alex Walker crossed for his first Super League try in the Round 8 home reversal to Huddersfield Giants.

=== April ===
- Matt Davis returned to parent club Warrington Wolves after the completion of his loan spell.
- James Meadows made his Super League debut in the Round 9 away defeat by Warrington Wolves.
- Matt Davies made his Super League debut in the Round 9 away loss to Warrington Wolves.
- Nathan Mason bagged his first Super League four-pointer for London Broncos when crossing the chalk line in the Round 9 reversal to Warrington Wolves.
- Rhys Williams ended a run of 138 consecutive games for the club since his arrival from Central Queensland Capras in 2015 when he was 'rested' by head coach, Danny Ward for the Coral Challenge Cup Round 5 tie at Betfred Championship club, Halifax R.L.F.C. That figure extended to 177 uninterrupted competitive matches when taking into account the 29-year-old's last 24 appearances for Central Queensland Capras prior to joining London Broncos, and a further 15 caps for Wales, the winger last missing a game in the World Cup defeat by the Cook Islands on 10 November 2013.
- Jacob Ogden scored his first London Broncos tries, a brace, in the Coral Challenge Cup Round 5 defeat at Betfred Championship club, Halifax R.L.F.C.
- Mark Ioane claimed his first try of the season in the Coral Challenge Cup Round 5 reversal at Betfred Championship club, Halifax R.L.F.C.
- Morgan Smith kicked his first goals for London Broncos in the Coral Challenge Cup Round 5 loss at Betfred Championship club, Halifax R.L.F.C.
- Eddie Battye remained the only ever-present following the Coral Challenge Cup Round 5 tie at Betfred Championship club, Halifax R.L.F.C.
- Mark Ioane notched his first Super League try in the Round 11 home defeat by Catalans Dragons.
- Morgan Smith kicked his first London Broncos Super League goal in the Round 11 home loss to Catalans Dragons.
- Sam Davis made his Super League debut in the Round 12 away reversal at Huddersfield Giants.
- Ryan Morgan claimed his first London Broncos try in the Round 12 away defeat at Huddersfield Giants.
- Morgan Smith kicked his first London Broncos drop goal in the Round 12 away loss at Huddersfield Giants.
- Daniel Hindmarsh made his Super League debut in the Round 13 home defeat by Salford Red Devils.

=== May ===
- Luke Yates made 62 tackles during the Round 14 defeat at Wigan Warriors, a season high to date, and only four short of the club record of 66 that Steele Retchless registered against Bradford Bulls in the 1998 Super League competition.
- Olsi Krasniqi joined London Broncos for the remainder of the 2019 Super League season from Championship club, Toronto Wolfpack following a loan spell at Bradford Bulls.
- Rhys Williams claimed his 100th try for London Broncos when he dotted down for the first of a brace in the Round 15 home victory over Wakefield Trinity.
- Jordan Abdull bagged a career best four try haul in the Round 15 home success against Wakefield Trinity, all of them scored in the first half.

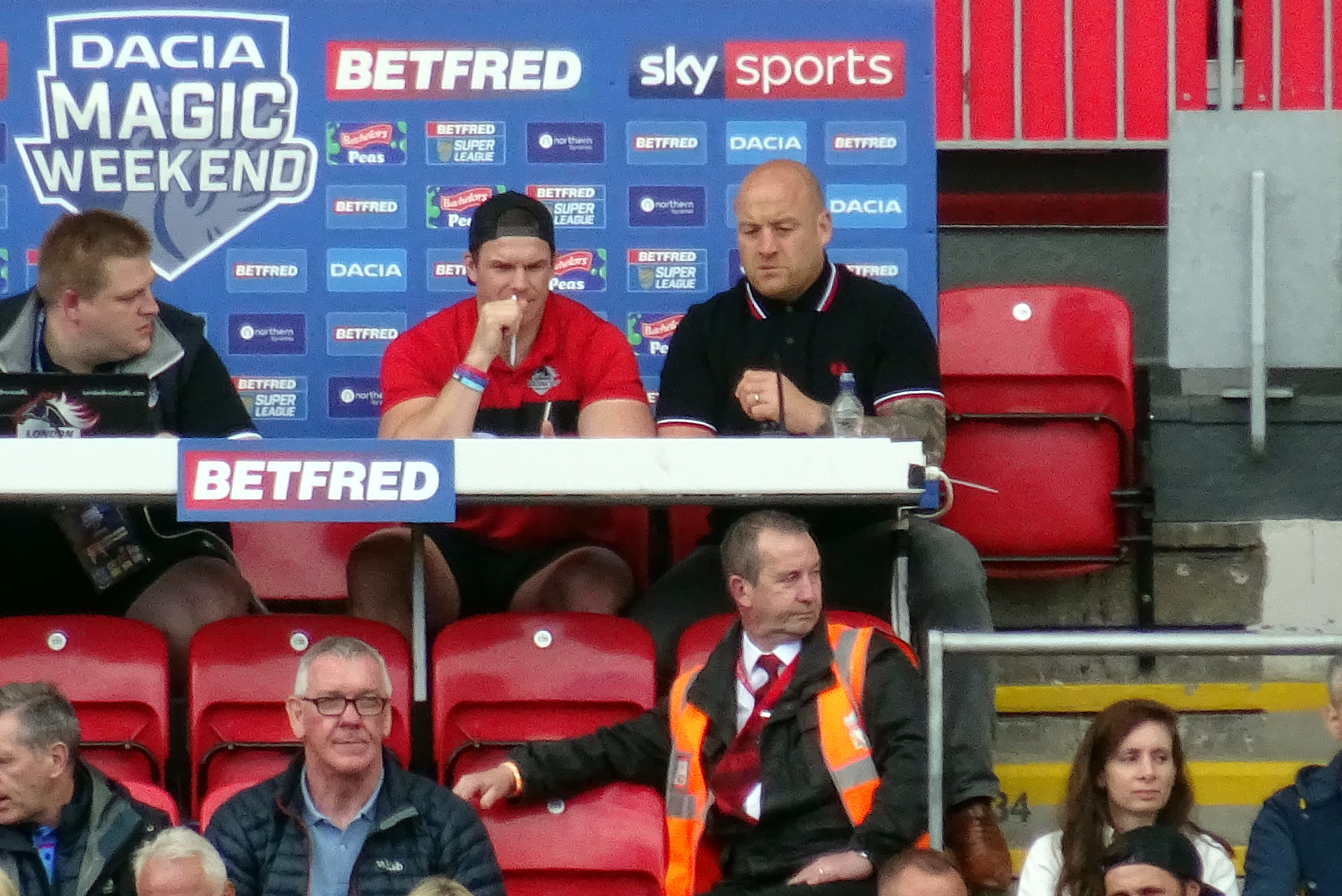
Jamie Langley and Danny Ward in the coaches box at Anfield

- London Broncos featured in the Dacia sponsored Magic Weekend for the first time since 2014 in their Round 16 fixture against Leeds Rhinos.

=== June ===
- London Broncos secured their first-ever after golden-point extra time victory in the Round 17 home victory over St. Helens.
- London Broncos broke their rugby league attendance record at the Trailfinders Sports Ground for the second time this season when a crowd of 2,801 witnessed the Round 17 home win against St. Helens.
- London Broncos win against St. Helens in Round 17 was their first in the capital versus the Saints since a (21–14) success on 27 April 2013.
- Kieran Dixon reached 100 points for the season when he converted the second of three goals in the home win against St. Helens.
- Alex Walker made his 100th career appearance in London Broncos home victory over St. Helens, 87 of them for the Broncos.
- Jordan Abdull made his 100th career appearance in London Broncos home triumph versus St. Helens, 16 of them for the London club.
- London Broncos victory at Catalans Dragons in Round 18 was the capital side's first win against the Dragons since a (11–4) victory as Harlequins RL at Cardiff's Millennium Stadium on 12 February 2011.
- London Broncos Round 18 win against Catalans Dragons was their first away win in seven attempts versus the French outfit, with their last victory at Stade Gilbert Brutus coming as Harlequins RL on 14 August 2010 (16–12).
- Elliot Kear made his 250th career appearance in London Broncos away victory over Catalans Dragons, 119 of them for the Broncos.
- London Broncos Round 19 home victory over Hull Kingston Rovers saw the club register three consecutive Super League wins for the first time since Rounds 23–25 in August 2012, when an away success at Castleford Tigers was sandwiched between home triumphs against Salford City Reds and Warrington Wolves.
- Morgan Smith scored his first try for London Broncos try in the Round 19 home win against Hull Kingston Rovers.
- Rob Butler bagged his first try for London Broncos try in the Round 19 home win versus Hull Kingston Rovers.
- London Broncos Head Coach, Danny Ward was named, along with Ian Watson of Salford Red Devils, as assistant coach to Wayne Bennett for the return of the Great Britain Rugby League Lions this autumn.
- London Broncos announce that Assistant Head Coach, Jamie Langley, has committed to a new two-year contract to remain with the capital club.
- Kieran Dixon kicked his 50th goal of the season when he converted Rhys Williams late consolation try in the Round 20 away defeat at Castleford Tigers.

=== July ===
- Ben Hellewell made his Super League debut in the Round 21 defeat at home to Warrington Wolves.
- Rhys Williams made his 150th appearance for the London Broncos in the Round 22 defeat at Hull F.C.
- Sadiq Adebiyi's try double in the Round 22 reversal at Hull F.C. were his first four-pointers in Super League.
- Jordan Abdull and Rob Butler were both named in a revised England Knights Performance Squad to prepare for October's historic international fixture against Jamaica at Emerald Headingley Stadium.
- Morgan Smith signs a new two-year contract to stay at London Broncos until the end of the 2021 season.
- Éloi Pélissier signs a new two-year contract to stay at London Broncos until the end of the 2021 season.
- Cory Aston signs a two-year contract to join London Broncos from fellow Super League outfit, Castleford Tigers ahead of the 2020 campaign.
- Luke Yates crossed for his first Super League try for London Broncos in the Round 23 home victory against St. Helens.
- Mark Ioane made his 100th career appearance for London Broncos in the Round 23 home success over St. Helens.
- Kieran Dixon notched his 150th goal for London Broncos during the Round 23 home win versus St. Helens.
- Kieran Dixon passed 150 points for the season during the Round 23 home win against St. Helens.
- London Broncos announce the signing of Sydney Roosters Scrum half, Brock Lamb until the end of the 2019 season.

=== August ===
- London Broncos announce Olsi Krasniqi has signed a two-year contract with the club, effective from the start of the 2020 season.
- London Broncos announce Guy Armitage has switched codes and signed a contract with the club for the remainder of the 2019 campaign and the 2020 season.
- Eddie Battye made his 100th appearance for the London Broncos in the Round 24 home defeat by Salford Red Devils.
- Brock Lamb made his Super League debut for London Broncos in the Round 24 home loss to Salford Red Devils.
- Kieran Dixon made his 100th Super League appearance in the Round 25 reversal at Castleford Tigers: 73 for (London Broncos 2012–2014, 2019) & 27 for (Hull KR 2015–2016) – (including play-offs & Super League Super 8s)
- Brock Lamb registered his first try for London Broncos in the Round 25 defeat by Castleford Tigers.
- London Broncos confirm the signing of former London Academy and current Castleford Tigers winger Tuoyo Egodo on a two-year contract, effective from the start of the 2020 season.
- Olsi Krasniqi made his 100th appearance for the London Broncos in the Round 26 away success at Catalans Dragons. First spell: 2010–2014, 92 appearances, Second spell: 2019, 8 appearances.
- Guy Armitage made his London Broncos debut in the Round 26 away victory at Catalans Dragons.
- Brock Lamb kicked his first London Broncos drop goal in the Round 26 away win at Catalans Dragons.
- London Broncos announce Daniel Hindmarsh has signed a new two-year contract to keep him at the club until the end of the 2021 season.
- London Broncos announce Eddie Battye has agreed a new two-year contract with the club that will see him stay in the capital until the end of the 2021 season.

=== September ===
- London Broncos broke their rugby league attendance record at the Trailfinders Sports Ground for the third time this season when a crowd of 3,051 witnessed the Round 27 home reversal against Leeds Rhinos.
- Elliot Kear made his 100th Super League career appearance in London Broncos Round 28 away victory at Hull KR, 25 of them for the Broncos (2019), 55 for Bradford Bulls (2012–2014) and 20 for Crusaders (2009–2011) – totals include play-offs & Super League Super 8s.
- Luke Yates made 63 tackles during the Round 28 win at Hull KR, a season high to date, and only three short of the club record of 66 Steele Retchless registered against Bradford Bulls in the 1998 Super League competition. The same player made 62 tackles in the Round 14 loss to Wigan Warriors in May.
- Eddie Battye was the only ever-present for London Broncos in 2019, featuring in all 29 Super League fixtures and the Coral Round 5 Challenge Cup defeat by Halifax R.L.F.C.
- Rhys Williams started in every Super League match for London Broncos in 2019.

== Tables ==
=== Betfred Super League ===
Pos	Team	Pld	W	D	L	PF	PA	PD	Pts	Qualification
1	St. Helens (C, L)	29	26	0	3	916	395	+521	52	Semi Final
2	Wigan Warriors	29	18	0	11	699	539	+160	36	Qualifying Final
3	Salford Red Devils	29	17	0	12	783	597	+186	34	Qualifying Final
4	Warrington Wolves	29	16	0	13	709	533	+176	32	Elimination Final
5	Castleford Tigers	29	15	0	14	646	558	+88	30	Elimination Final
6	Hull F.C.	29	15	0	14	645	768	−123	30	
7	Catalans Dragons	29	13	0	16	553	745	−192	26	
8	Leeds Rhinos	29	12	0	17	650	644	+6	24	
9	Wakefield Trinity	29	11	0	18	608	723	−115	22	
10	Huddersfield Giants	29	11	0	18	571	776	−205	22	
11	Hull KR	29	10	0	19	548	768	−220	20	
12	London Broncos (R)	29	10	0	19	505	787	−282	20	Relegated to Championship

(C) Champions; (L) League Leaders' Shield Winners; (R) Relegated

== Fixtures and results (Broncos score first) ==
LEGEND
Win
Draw
Loss

=== Pre-season ===
Date	Competition	Vrs	H/A	Venue	Result	Score	Tries	Goals	Att	Live on TV	Report
20/01/2019	Friendly	Doncaster	Away	Keepmoat Stadium	W	64–6	Pitts, Morgan, Kear, Cunningham, Adebiyi, Dixon (2), Battye, Lovell, Ioane, Pélissier	Abdull 5/5, Dixon 5/6	-	-	Report
27/01/2019	Friendly	Leigh Centurions	Away	Leigh Sports Village	W	20–0	Cunningham, Adebiyi, Yates, Williams	Abdull 1/1, Dixon 1/3	2,028	-	Report

=== Betfred Super League ===
Date	Competition	Vrs	H/A	Venue	Result	Score	Tries	Goals	Att	Live on TV	Report!
03/02/2019	Round 1	Wakefield Trinity	Home	Trailfinders Sports Ground	W	42–24	Fleming, Williams (2), Dixon, Battye (2), Fozard, Kear	Abdull 1/3, Dixon 4/5	2,149	-	Report
10/02/2019	Round 2	Salford Red Devils	Away	AJ Bell Stadium	L	0-24	-	-	3,236	-	Report
17/02/2019	Round 10	Hull Kingston Rovers	Away	KCOM Craven Park	L	12–22	Gee, Pitts	Dixon 2/2	7,210	-	Report
23/02/2019	Round 3	Castleford Tigers	Home	Trailfinders Sports Ground	L	6-40	Williams	Dixon 1/1	2,051	Sky Sports	Report
03/03/2019	Round 4	Wigan Warriors	Home	Trailfinders Sports Ground	W	18–16	Battye, Gee, Dixon	Dixon 2/3, 1/1(pen)	2,586	-	Report
08/03/2019	Round 5	St. Helens	Away	Totally Wicked Stadium	L	0-26	-	-	9,090	-	Report
15/03/2019	Round 6	Leeds Rhinos	Away	Emerald Headingley Stadium	W	18–16	Pitts, Fozard, Lovell	Dixon 2/3, 1/1 (pen)	11,229	-	Report
24/03/2019	Round 7	Hull F.C.	Home	Trailfinders Sports Ground	L	24–28	Kear, Pélissier, Abdull, Williams	Dixon 3/4, 1/1 (pen)	2,357	-	Report
31/03/2019	Round 8	Huddersfield Giants	Home	Trailfinders Sports Ground	L	26–38	Walker, Pitts, Williams, Dixon 2	Dixon 3/5	1,419	-	Report
05/04/2019	Round 9	Warrington Wolves	Away	Halliwell Jones Stadium	L	12–48	Mason, Gee	Dixon 2/2	11,718	-	Report
18/04/2019	Round 11	Catalans Dragons	Home	Trailfinders Sports Ground	L	6-39	Ioane	Smith 1/1	2,153	-	Report
22/04/2019	Round 12	Huddersfield Giants	Away	John Smiths Stadium	L	19–24	Pitts, Williams, Morgan	Dixon 3/4, Smith 1DG	4,464	-	Report
27/04/2019	Round 13	Salford Red Devils	Home	Trailfinders Sports Ground	L	10–30	Williams, Fleming	Dixon 1/2	1,133	-	Report
02/05/2019	Round 14	Wigan Warriors	Away	DW Stadium	L	8–18	Pitts	Dixon 1/1, 1/1 (pen)	9,907	Sky Sports	Report
18/05/2019	Round 15	Wakefield Trinity	Home	Trailfinders Sports Ground	W	42–34	Abdull (4), Williams (2), Dixon (2)	Dixon 5/8	1,205	-	Report
26/05/2019	Round 16	Leeds Rhinos	Dacia Magic Weekend - Neutral	Anfield	L	22–24	Morgan, Abdull (2), Walker	Dixon 3/4	26,812	Sky Sports	Report
09/06/2019	Round 17	St. Helens	Home	Trailfinders Sports Ground	W	23-22 (Note: After golden-point extra time)	Morgan (2), Cunningham, Pitts	Dixon 3/4, Smith 1DG	2,801	-	Report
15/06/2019	Round 18	Catalans Dragons	Away	Stade Gilbert Brutus	W	30–12	Abdull, Williams (2), Kear, Dixon	Dixon 5/6	8,137	Sky Sports	Report
20/06/2019	Round 19	Hull Kingston Rovers	Home	Trailfinders Sports Ground	W	26–24	Smith, Walker, Abdull, Butler	Dixon 5/6	1,503	Sky Sports	Report
30/06/2019	Round 20	Castleford Tigers	Away	The Mend-A-Hose Jungle	L	10–42	Dixon, Williams	Dixon 1/2	6,860	-	Report
06/07/2019	Round 21	Warrington Wolves	Home	Trailfinders Sports Ground	L	6-36	Fozard	Dixon 1/1	2,357	-	Report
11/07/2019	Round 22	Hull F.C.	Away	KCOM Stadium	L	22–35	Fleming, Abdull, Adebiyi (2)	Dixon 3/4	11,401	Sky Sports	Report
21/07/2019	Round 23	St. Helens	Home	Trailfinders Sports Ground	W	32–12	Fleming (2), Yates, Walker, Gee	Dixon 5/5, 1/1 (pen)	2,087	-	Report
04/08/2019	Round 24	Salford Red Devils	Home	Trailfinders Sports Ground	L	28–58	Williams, Yates, Adebiyi, Butler	Dixon 4/5	1,445	-	Report
10/08/2019	Round 25	Castleford Tigers	Away	The Mend-A-Hose Jungle	L	6-20	Lamb	Dixon 1/2	5,497	-	Report
17/08/2019	Round 26	Catalans Dragons	Away	Stade Gilbert Brutus	W	17–4	Dixon, Walker	Dixon 4/4, Lamb 1DG	7,727	Sky Sports	Report
01/09/2019	Round 27	Leeds Rhinos	Home	Trailfinders Sports Ground	L	10–36	Dixon, Morgan	Dixon 1/2	3,051	-	Report
06/09/2019	Round 28	Hull Kingston Rovers	Away	KCOM Craven Park	W	20–16	Gee, Lamb, Pitts	Dixon 3/3, 1/2 (pen)	8,020	Sky Sports	Report
13/09/2019	Round 29	Wakefield Trinity	Away	Mobile Rocket Stadium	L	10–19	Walker, Lamb	Dixon 1/2, 0/1 (pen)	6,230	Sky Sports	Report

=== Coral Challenge Cup ===
Date	Competition	Vrs	H/A	Venue	Result	Score	Tries	Goals	Att	Live on TV	Report
11/04/2019	Round 5	Halifax R.L.F.C.	Away	Shay Stadium	L	16–24	Ioane, Ogden (2)	Smith 2/3	728	-	Report

== Player appearances ==
=== Betfred Super League ===
FB=Fullback (1)	W=Winger (2 & 5)	C=Centre (3 & 4)	SO=Stand Off (6)	SH=Scrum half (7)	P=Prop (8)	H=Hooker (9)	FR=Front Row (10)	SR=Second Row (11 & 12)	LF=Loose forward (13)	I=Interchange (14–17)

Squad No	Player	R1	R2	R10	R3	R4	R5	R6	R7	R8	R9	R11	R12	R13	R14	R15	R16	R17	R18	R19	R20	R21	R22	R23	R24	R25	R26	R27	R28	R29
1	Alex Walker	FB	FB	FB	x	FB	FB	FB	FB	FB	FB	FB	FB	FB	FB	FB	FB	FB	FB	FB	FB	FB	x	FB	FB	FB	FB	FB	FB	FB
2	Rhys Williams	W	W	W	W	W	W	W	W	W	W	W	W	W	W	W	W	W	W	W	W	W	W	W	W	W	W	W	W	W
3	Ben Hellewell	x	x	x	x	x	x	x	x	x	x	x	x	x	x	x	x	x	x	x	x	C	C	x	x	x	x	x	x	x
4	Elliot Kear	C	C	C	C	C	W	C	C	C	x	C	x	x	C	C	C	C	C	C	C	C	W	C	C	C	C	C	C	C
5	Kieran Dixon	W	W	W	W	W	x	W	W	W	W	x	W	W	W	W	W	W	W	W	W	W	FB	W	W	W	W	W	W	W
6	Jordan Abdull	SO	SO	SO	SO	SO	SO	SO	SO	SO	x	SO	x	I	SO	SO	SO	SO	SO	SO	SO	SO	I	SO	SO	SO	SO	SO	SO	SO
7	James Cunningham	SH	SH	SH	SH	SH	x	SH	x	x	x	I	SO	SH	H	H	H	H	H	H	H	H	SO	H	H	H	H	H	H	H
8	Eddie Battye	I	I	I	I	P	P	P	P	I	I	P	P	P	P	P	P	P	P	P	P	I	P	I	I	I	P	P	P	P
9	Éloi Pélissier	I	I	I	I	x	H	H	H	H	H	H	H	x	I	I	x	x	x	x	x	x	x	x	x	x	x	x	x	x
10	Mark Ioane	I	I	I	FR	x	I	x	x	x	I	I	I	x	x	x	x	I	I	I	x	I	I	I	x	I	x	x	x	x
11	Will Lovell	I	I	I	SR	SR	SR	I	I	x	LF	x	x	LF	SR	SR	SR	x	x	x	I	x	x	x	x	x	SR	SR	x	I
12	Jay Pitts	SR	SR	SR	SR	SR	x	SR	SR	SR	SR	SR	SR	SR	SR	SR	SR	SR	SR	SR	SR	x	SR	SR	SR	SR	SR	SR	SR	SR
13	Sadiq Adebiyi	x	x	x	P	x	I	x	x	x	x	I	I	I	I	I	I	x	x	x	x	SR	SR	SR	SR	SR	x	x	x	x
14	Matty Fozard	H	H	H	H	H	I	I	I	I	x	x	x	x	x	x	I	I	I	I	I	I	SH	SH	I	I	I	I	I	I
15	Greg Richards	P	FR	FR	I	I	x	I	I	I	FR	I	I	x	I	I	I	I	I	x	I	P	x	I	I	x	x	x	x	x
16	Matty Gee	SR	SR	SR	x	I	I	x	x	SR	SR	SR	SR	I	x	I	I	SR	x	SR	SR	SR	FR	I	x	x	I	I	SR	SR
17	Matty Fleming	C	x	x	FB	x	C	x	x	C	C	x	C	C	x	x	x	x	SR	x	x	I	C	C	C	C	x	x	x	x
18	Nathan Mason	FR	P	P	I	FR	x	I	I	I	I	x	x	x	x	x	x	x	x	I	x	x	x	x	I	P	x	I	I	I
19	Ryan Morgan	x	C	C	C	C	x	C	C	x	C	C	C	C	C	C	C	C	C	C	C	x	x	x	x	x	C	C	C	C
20	Luke Yates	LF	LF	LF	LF	LF	SR	SR	SR	FR	x	LF	LF	SR	LF	LF	LF	LF	LF	LF	LF	LF	LF	LF	LF	LF	LF	LF	LF	LF
21	Dan Hindmarsh	x	x	x	x	x	x	x	x	x	x	x	x	I	I	x	x	x	x	x	x	x	I	x	x	x	I	x	I	I
22	James Meadows	x	x	x	x	x	x	x	x	x	SH	x	x	x	x	x	x	x	x	x	x	x	x	x	x	x	x	x	x	x
23	Rob Butler	x	x	x	x	I	FR	FR	FR	P	P	P	P	FR	FR	FR	FR	I	I	I	I	FR	I	P	FR	FR	x	I	FR	FR
24	Jacob Ogden	x	x	x	x	x	C	x	x	x	x	W	x	x	x	x	x	x	x	x	x	x	x	x	x	x	x	x	x	x
25	Matt Davies	x	x	x	x	x	x	x	x	x	I	x	x	x	x	x	x	x	x	x	x	x	x	x	x	x	x	x	x	x
26	Sam Davis	x	x	x	x	x	x	x	x	x	x	x	I	H	x	x	x	x	x	x	x	x	H	x	x	x	x	x	x	x
27	Gideon Boafo	x	x	x	x	x	x	x	x	x	x	x	x	x	x	x	x	x	x	x	x	x	x	x	x	x	x	x	x	x
28	Morgan Smith	x	x	x	x	I	SH	x	SH	SH	SO	SH	SH	SO	SH	SH	SH	SH	SH	SH	SH	SH	x	x	x	x	x	x	x	x
29	Matt Davis	x	x	x	x	x- (Note: Joined on a month's loan from Warrington Wolves)	LF	LF	LF	LF	(Note: Ended loan period and returned to Warrington Wolves)	x	x	x	x	x	x	x	x	x	x	x	x	x	x	x	x	x	x	x
30	Olsi Krasniqi	x	x	x	x	x	x	x	x	x	x	x	x	x	x- (Note: Joined for the rest of the season from Toronto Wolfpack)	x	x	FR	FR	FR	FR	x	x	FR	P	I	FR	FR	x	x
31	Brock Lamb	x	x	x	x	x	x	x	x	x	x	x	x	x	x	x	x	x	x	x	x	x	x	x- (Note: Joined for the rest of the season from Sydney Roosters)	SH	SH	SH	SH	SH	SH
32	Guy Armitage	x	x	x	x	x	x	x	x	x	x	x	x	x	x	x	x	x	x	x	x	x	x	x- (Note: Switched codes and joined for the rest of the season from Ealing Trailfinders)	x	x	I	x	I	x

=== Coral Challenge Cup ===
FB=Fullback (1)	W=Winger (2 & 5)	C=Centre (3 & 4)	SO=Stand Off (6)	SH=Scrum half (7)	P=Prop (8)	H=Hooker (9)	FR=Front Row (10)	SR=Second Row (11 & 12)	LF=Loose forward (13)	I=Interchange (14–17)

Squad No	Player	R5
1	Alex Walker	x
2	Rhys Williams	x
3	Ben Hellewell	W
4	Elliot Kear	C
5	Kieran Dixon	x
6	Jordan Abdull	I
7	James Cunningham	I
8	Eddie Battye	I
9	Éloi Pélissier	H
10	Mark Ioane	I
11	Will Lovell	SR
12	Jay Pitts	SR
13	Sadiq Adebiyi	x
14	Matty Fozard	x
15	Greg Richards	P
16	Matty Gee	LF
17	Matty Fleming	FB
18	Nathan Mason	FR
19	Ryan Morgan	C
20	Luke Yates	x
21	Dan Hindmarsh	x
22	James Meadows	SH
23	Rob Butler	x
24	Jacob Ogden	W
25	Matt Davies	x
26	Sam Davis	x
27	Gideon Boafa	x
28	Morgan Smith	SO

== Squad statistics ==
- Appearances and points include (Betfred Super League and Coral Challenge Cup) as of 16 September 2019.

Squad No	Player	International Country	Position	Age	Previous club	Apps	Tries	Goals	DG	Points
1	Alex Walker	(Scotland)	Full back	30	London Broncos Academy	27	6	0	0	24
2	Rhys Williams	(Wales)	Wing	36	Central Queensland Capras	29	13	0	0	52
3	Ben Hellewell	(Scotland)	Centre	34	Featherstone Rovers	3	0	0	0	0
4	Elliot Kear	(Wales)	Centre	37	London Welsh RFC	27	3	0	0	12
5	Kieran Dixon	(England)	Wing	33	Hull Kingston Rovers	27	10	75	0	190
6	Jordan Abdull	(England)	Stand off	30	Hull F.C.	28	10	1	0	42
7	James Cunningham	(England)	Hooker	32	Hull F.C.	26	1	0	0	4
8	Eddie Battye	(England)	Prop	34	Sheffield Eagles	30	3	0	0	12
9	Éloi Pélissier	(France)	Hooker	35	Lézignan Sangliers	14	1	0	0	4
10	Mark Ioane	(New Zealand)	Prop	35	St George Illawarra Dragons	16	2	0	0	8
11	Will Lovell	(England)	Second row	33	London Skolars	18	1	0	0	4
12	Jay Pitts	(England)	Second row	36	Bradford Bulls	28	7	0	0	28
13	Sadiq Adebiyi	(England)	Loose forward	29	London Broncos Academy	13	3	0	0	12
14	Matty Fozard	(Wales)	Hooker	31	Sheffield Eagles	23	3	0	0	12
15	Greg Richards	(England)	Prop	30	Leigh Centurions	21	0	0	0	0
16	Matty Gee	(England)	Second row	31	Salford Red Devils	23	5	0	0	20
17	Matty Fleming	(England)	Centre	30	St Helens	14	6	0	0	24
18	Nathan Mason	(England)	Prop	32	Huddersfield Giants	16	1	0	0	4
19	Ryan Morgan	(Australia)	Centre	36	St Helens (Season Loan)	22	5	0	0	20
20	Luke Yates	(Australia)	Loose forward	31	Newcastle Knights	28	2	0	0	8
21	Daniel Hindmarsh	(England)	Second row	27	London Broncos Academy	6	0	0	0	0
22	James Meadows	(England)	Stand off	27	London Broncos Academy	2	0	0	0	0
23	Rob Butler	(England)	Front Row	28	London Broncos Academy	24	2	0	0	8
24	Jacob Ogden	(Jamaica)	Centre	28	London Broncos Academy	3	2	0	0	8
25	Matt Davies	(England)	Scrum half	28	London Broncos Academy	1	0	0	0	0
26	Sam Davis	(England)	Hooker	27	London Broncos Academy	3	0	0	0	0
27	Gideon Boafa	(England)	Winger	19	London Broncos Academy	0	0	0	0	0
28	Morgan Smith	(England)	Scrum half	28	Warrington Wolves	17	1	3	2	12
29	Matt Davis (Note: No longer at the club)	(England)	Loose forward	30	Warrington Wolves (Loan)	4	0	0	0	0
30	Olsi Krasniqi	(Albania)	Prop	34	Toronto Wolfpack	9	0	0	0	0
31	Brock Lamb	(Australia)	Scrum half	29	Sydney Roosters	6	3	0	1	13
32	Guy Armitage	(England)	Wing	34	Ealing Trailfinders Rugby Club	2	0	0	0	0

== Tale of the Tape ==
Most Points in a Game

- 18, Round 15: Kieran Dixon vs. Wakefield Trinity (2 tries and 5 goals)

Most tries in a Game

- 4, Round 15: Jordan Abdull vs. Wakefield Trinity

Highest score in a winning game

- 42, Round 1: vs. Wakefield Trinity & Round 15: vs. Wakefield Trinity

Lowest score in a winning game

- 17, Round 26: vs. Catalans Dragons

Greatest winning margin

- 20, Round 23: vs. St. Helens

Greatest number of games won consecutively

- 3, Round 17 to Round 19

Highest score in a losing game

- 28, Round 24: vs. Salford Red Devils

Lowest score in a losing game

- 0, Round 2: vs. Salford Red Devils, Round 5: vs. St. Helens

Greatest losing margin

- 36, Round 9: vs. Warrington Wolves

Greatest number of games lost consecutively

- 8, Round 7 to Round 14. Includes the defeat at Halifax R.L.F.C. in Challenge Cup Round 5, but excludes Round 10 reversal at Hull Kingston Rovers which was brought forward and played after Round 2.

== Transfers ==
=== In ===
Country	Name	Position	Signed from	Date
(Wales)	Matty Fozard	Hooker	Sheffield Eagles	October 2018
(England)	Nathan Mason	Prop	Huddersfield Giants	October 2018
(England)	Greg Richards	Prop	Leigh Centurions	October 2018
(England)	Jordan Abdull	Stand off	Hull F.C.	November 2018
(Australia)	Ryan Morgan	Centre	St. Helens (On loan for the 2019 season)	November 2018
(Australia)	Luke Yates	Loose forward	Newcastle Knights	December 2018
(England)	Morgan Smith	Hooker	Warrington Wolves	January 2019
(Albania)	Olsi Krasniqi	Prop	Toronto Wolfpack	May 2019
(England)	Cory Aston	Stand off	Castleford Tigers	July 2019, for the 2020 season
(Australia)	Brock Lamb	Scrum half	Sydney Roosters	July 2019
(England)	Guy Armitage	Winger	Ealing Trailfinders Rugby Club	August 2019
(England)	Tuoyo Egodo	Winger	Castleford Tigers	August 2019, for the 2020 season

=== Out ===
Country	Name	Position	Signed for	Date
(Wales)	Ben Evans	Prop	Toulouse Olympique	November 2018
(England)	Tom Spencer	Prop	Leigh Centurions	November 2018
(England)	Kameron Pearce-Paul	Wing	Coventry Bears	November 2018
(Malta)	Jarrod Sammut	Scrum half	Wigan Warriors	November 2018

== Awards ==
=== London Broncos Awards Night ===
Held in Central London on Tuesday 17 September.

- London Broncos Man of Steel: Eddie Battye
- London Broncos Chairmans Player of the Year: Kieran Dixon
- London Broncos Players Player of the Year: Luke Yates
- London Broncos Young Player of the Year: Rob Butler
