= Matty Fleming =

English rugby league footballer

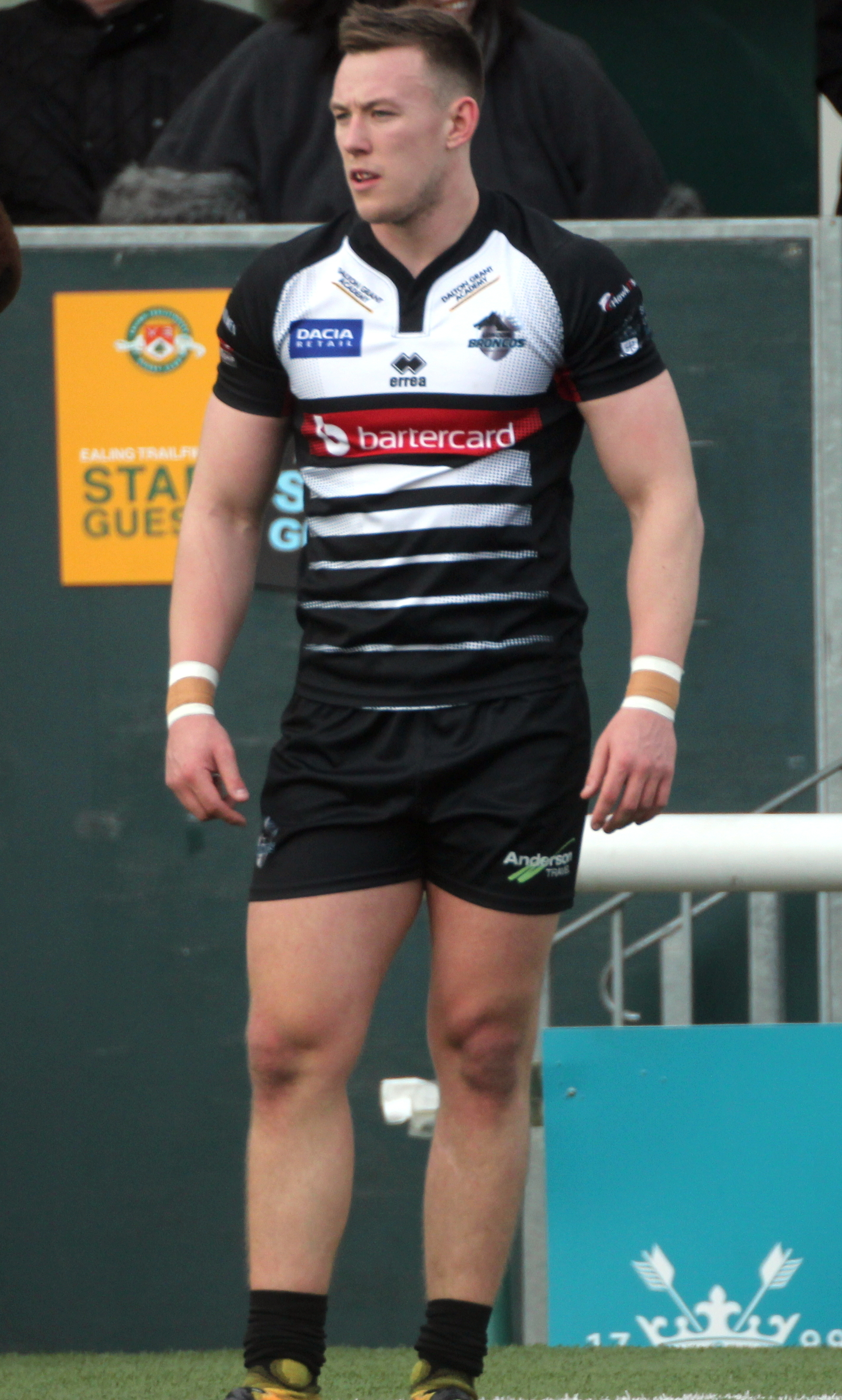

Personal information
- Full name: Matthew Fleming
- Born: 13 January 1996 (age 30) Warrington, Cheshire, England
- Height: 6 ft 0 in (183 cm)
- Weight: 14 st 9 lb (93 kg)

Playing information
- Position: Centre, Fullback, Wing
Club
Years	Team	Pld	T	G	FG	P
2015–17	St Helens	19	7	0	0	28
2017(loan)	→ Leigh Centurions	10	2	0	0	8
2018–19	London Broncos	24	6	0	0	24
2018(loan)	→ London Skolars	12	4	0	0	16
2020–21	Dewsbury Rams	23	7	0	0	28
2022–	Widnes Vikings	99	26	0	1	45
	Total	187	52	0	1	149
- Source: As of 5 November 2026

Matthew "Matty" Fleming (born 13 January 1996) is an English professional rugby league footballer who plays as a centre for the Widnes Vikings in the Championship.

Fleming played for St Helens in the Super League, and on loan from Saints at the Leigh Centurions in the top flight. He played for the London Broncos in the Championship and the Super League, and spent time on loan from the Broncos at the London Skolars in League 1.

== Personal ==
He attended Bridgewater High School, Warrington and played junior rugby for Warrington Rugby Union Club until aged 16, when he joined the Wolves Scholarship programme, also playing for Bold Miners RLFC.

== Career ==
Fleming made his Saints début on 17 April 2015 in a Super League match against Leeds.

Fleming made his first start for London in the round 3 victory over Featherstone Rovers.
