= Nathan Mason =

English rugby league footballer

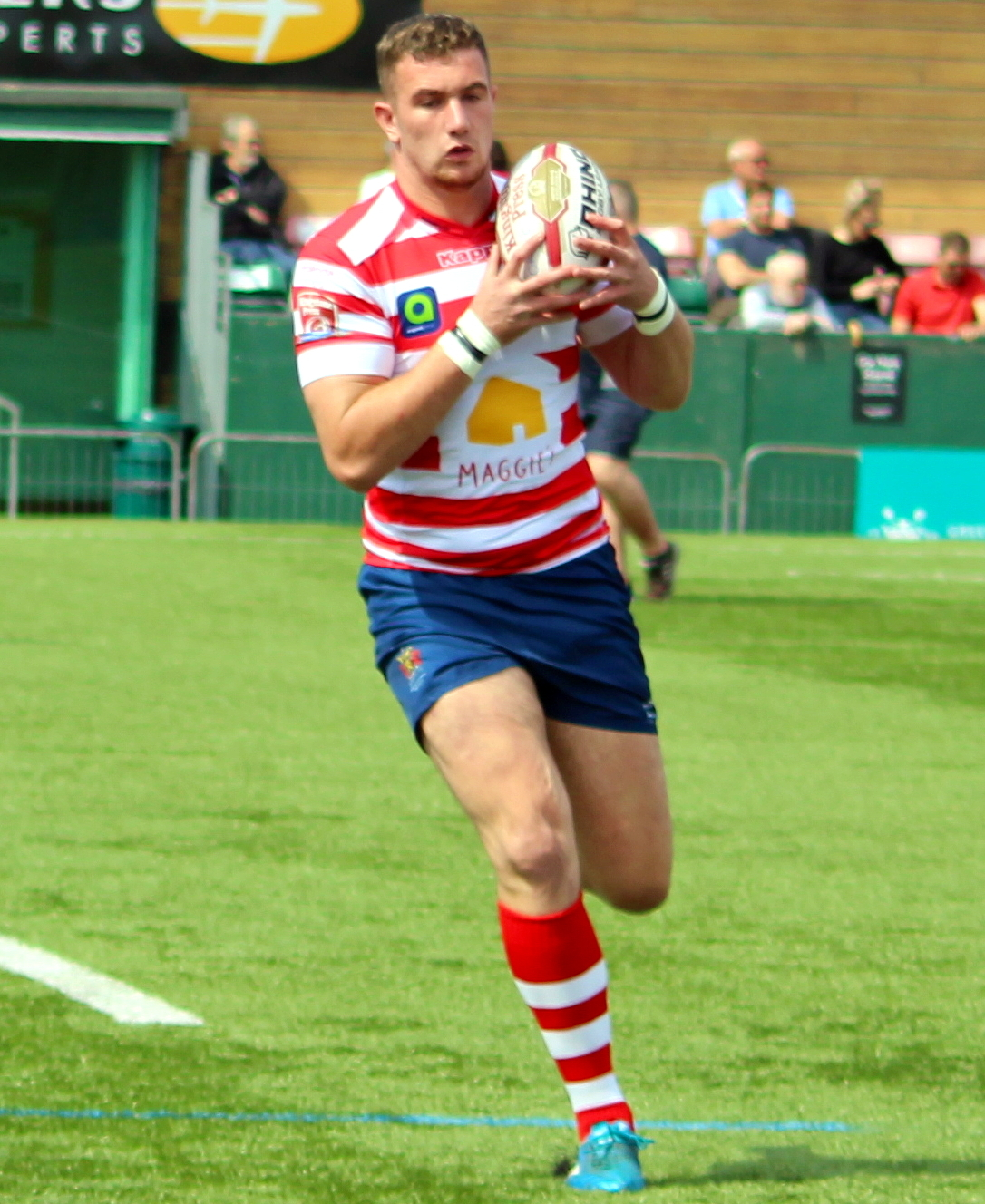

Personal information
- Born: 8 September 1993 (age 32) Oldham, Greater Manchester, England

Playing information
- Height: 6 ft 5 in (1.96 m)
- Weight: 16 st 5 lb (104 kg)
- Position: Prop
Club
Years	Team	Pld	T	G	FG	P
2013–18	Huddersfield Giants	33	4	0	0	16
2013(loan)	→ Oldham	4	2	0	0	8
2014(loan)	→ Batley Bulldogs	2	0	0	0	0
2014(loan)	→ Oldham	16	2	0	0	8
2015(loan)	→ Oldham	14	1	0	0	4
2017(loan)	→ Oldham	3	0	0	0	0
2018(loan)	→ Leigh Centurions	22	6	0	0	24
2019	London Broncos	16	1	0	0	4
2019(DR)	→ Sheffield Eagles	8	1	0	0	4
2020–21	Leigh Centurions	8	1	0	0	4
2022–23	Huddersfield Giants	8	0	0	0	0
2022(DR)	→ Halifax Panthers	3	0	0	0	0
2023(loan)	→ Wakefield Trinity	1	0	0	0	0
2023(loan)	→ Bradford Bulls	2	2	0	0	8
2024–25	Bradford Bulls	14	3	0	0	12
	Total	154	23	0	0	92

Nathan Mason (born 8 September 1993) is an English rugby league footballer who last played as a prop for the Bradford Bulls in the RFL Championship.

He previously played for the Huddersfield Giants in the Super League, and on loan from Huddersfield at Oldham in the Championship and League 1, and the Batley Bulldogs and Leigh in the Championship. Mason also played for the London Broncos in the Super League, and spent time on loan from the Broncos at the Sheffield Eagles in the second tier.

== Background ==
Nathan Mason was born in Oldham, Greater Manchester, England.

== Career ==
In October 2017 he joined the Leigh Centurions on a one-year loan deal.

In 2019 he helped the Eagles to win the inaugural 1895 Cup as they defeated the Widnes Vikings 36–18 in the final.

=== Bradford Bulls ===
On 1 July 2024 it was reported that he had signed for Bradford Bulls in the RFL Championship on a 18-month deal

On 20 October 2025 it was reported that he had left Bradford Bulls
