= Eddie Battye =

English professional rugby league footballer

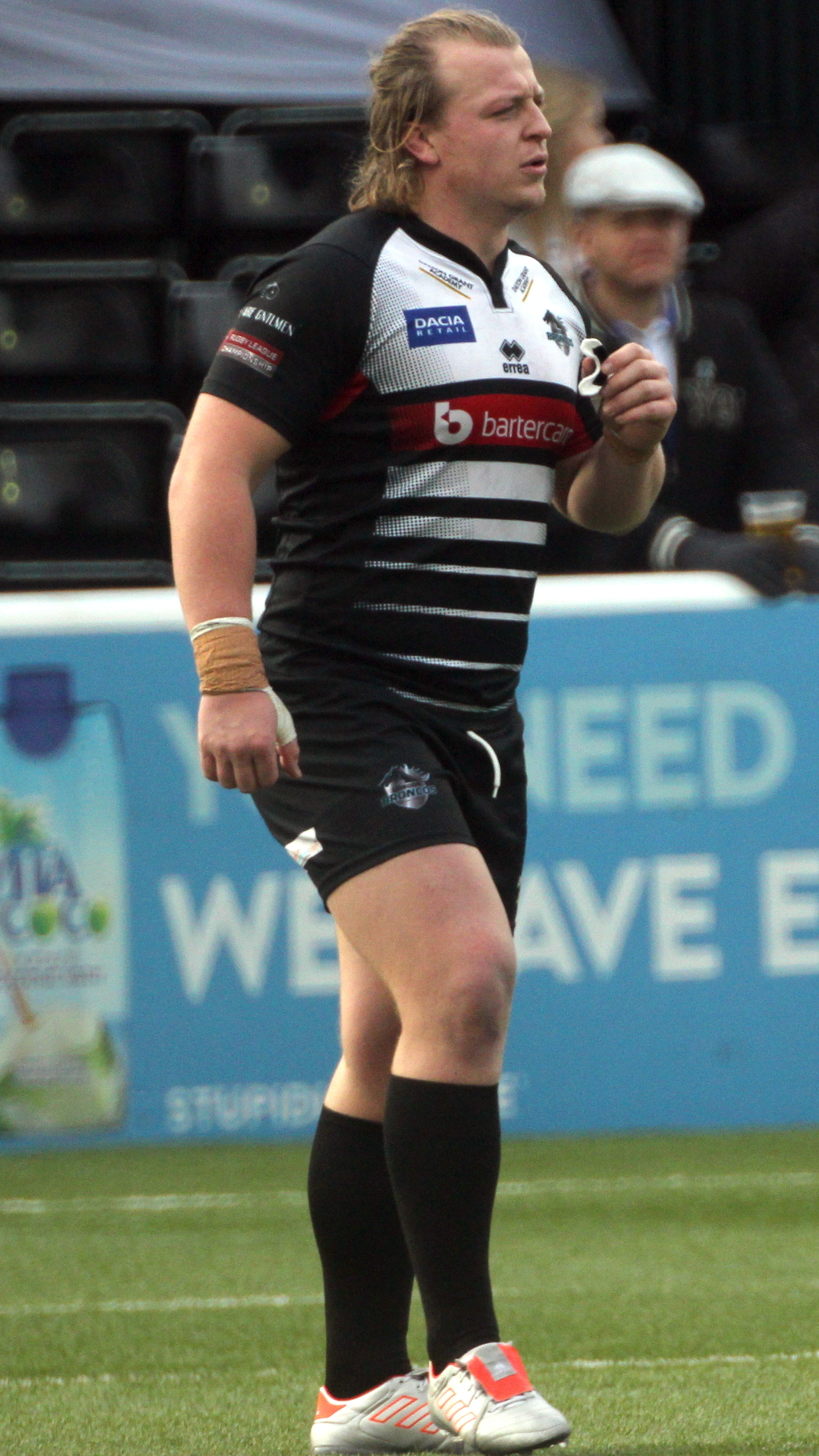

Personal information
- Full name: Edward Battye
- Born: 24 July 1991 (age 35) Yorkshire, England
- Height: 5 ft 10 in (1.78 m)
- Weight: 16 st 5 lb (104 kg)

Playing information
- Position: Prop, Loose forward
Club
Years	Team	Pld	T	G	FG	P
2011	Sheffield Eagles	1	1	0	0	4
2012	Villeneuve Leopards	17	3	0	0	12
2013–15	Sheffield Eagles	76	5	0	0	20
2016–21	London Broncos	111	11	0	0	44
2020(loan)	→ Wakefield Trinity	8	1	0	0	4
2021–23	Wakefield Trinity	68	0	0	0	0
2024–25	Sheffield Eagles	58	6	0	0	24
2026	Hunslet RLFC	26	3	0	0	12
2027–	Birmingham Hurricanes	0	0	0	0	0
	Total	365	30	0	0	120
- Source: As of 3 November 2026

Edward "Eddie" Battye (born 30 December 1991) is an English rugby league footballer who plays as a prop for Birmingham Hurricanes in the RFL Championship.

He has previously played for the Sheffield Eagles over three separate spells in the Championship, the Villeneuve Leopards in the Elite One Championship and the London Broncos in the Championship and the Super League. Battye has also spent time on loan from the Broncos at Wakefield in the Super League.

== Background ==
Battye was born in England. He was brought up on a buffalo farm in Penistone, South Yorkshire.

== Career ==
=== Sheffield Eagles ===
Battye played junior rugby league for Hillsborough Hawks and signed with the Sheffield Eagles and made his Championship debut in 2011.

After a spell in France playing for Villeneuve Leopards he returned to the Eagles and became a regular, featuring in their Championship winning team in 2013. He joined London Broncos in 2016.

In 2017, Battye was kept out of rugby league for four months due to a knee injury.

=== London Broncos ===
He put in a man of the match performance in the first game of the 2018 Qualifiers against Widnes at The Halton stadium. His team London Broncos came out 20–21 winners in an enthralling game at The Halton stadium in Widnes.

Battye put in an outstanding performance and contributed a try in an outstanding team effort to defeat Wigan in an 18-16 thriller on 9 March 2019.

=== Wakefield Trinity ===
On 24 January 2021, it was reported that he had signed for Wakefield Trinity in the Super League. Battye featured in 24 games for Wakefield Trinity in the Super League XXVIII season as the club finished bottom of the table and were relegated to the RFL Championship which ended their 24-year stay in the top flight.

=== Sheffield Eagles (re-join) ===
On 2 Nov 2023 it was reported that he will re-join Sheffield Eagles on a two-year deal.

=== Hunslet RLFC ===
On 11 October 2025 it was reported that he had left Sheffield Eagles and joined Hunslet RLFC on a one-year deal for 2026

=== Birmingham Hurricanes ===
On 3 November 2026 it was reported that he had signed for Birmingham Hurricanes in the RFL Championship
