= Morgan Smith (rugby league) =

English rugby league footballer

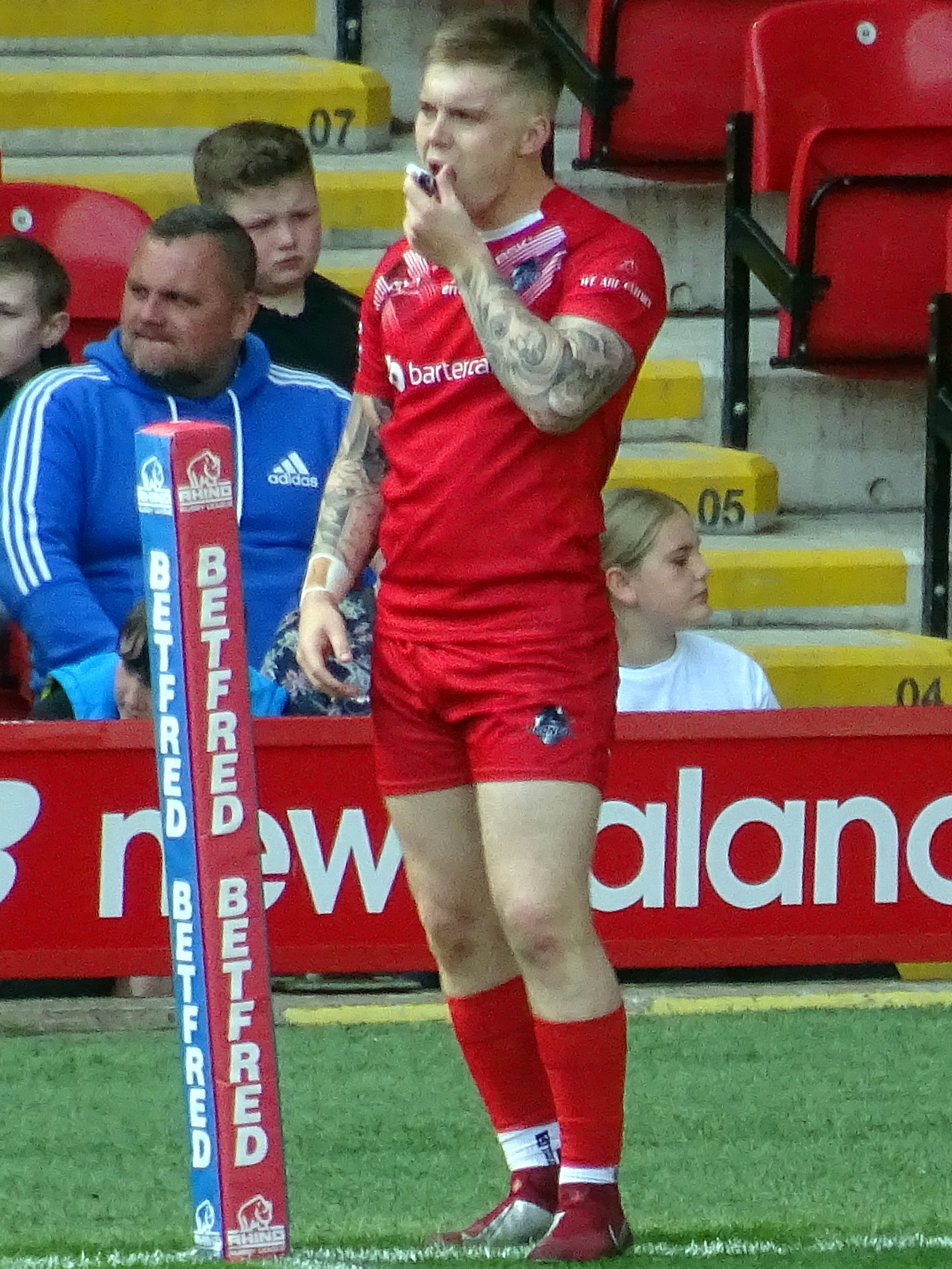

Personal information
- Full name: Morgan Lee Smith
- Born: 30 April 1998 (age 28) Featherstone, Yorkshire, England
- Height: 5 ft 8 in (1.73 m)
- Weight: 13 st 3 lb (84 kg)

Playing information
- Position: Scrum-half, Stand-off, Hooker
Club
Years	Team	Pld	T	G	FG	P
2016–18	Warrington Wolves	25	2	1	0	10
2018(loan)	→ Rochdale Hornets	10	2	11	1	31
2019–20	London Broncos	19	1	3	2	12
2021	York City Knights	0	0	0	0	0
2022	Featherstone Rovers	30	22	0	1	89
2023	Wakefield Trinity	14	2	0	0	8
2024	Hull FC	26	2	0	0	8
2025	Sheffield Eagles	10	6	0	0	24
2025–26	Oldham	36	12	73	0	194
	Total	170	49	88	4	376
- Source: As of 22 October 2026
- Relatives: Peter Smith (grandfather)

Morgan Smith (born 30 April 1998) is an English professional rugby league footballer who last played as a scrum-half, stand-off or hooker for Oldham in the RFL Championship.

He previously played for the Warrington Wolves and Wakefield Trinity in the Super League, and on loan from Warrington at the Rochdale Hornets in the Championship. Smith has also played for the London Broncos in the Super League and the Championship as well as the York City Knights and Featherstone Rovers in the RFL Championship.

== Background ==
Morgan Smith is the grandson of the rugby league footballer; Peter Smith.

== Playing career ==
=== Warrington Wolves ===
He has played for the Warrington Wolves in the Super League, and on loan from Warrington for the Rochdale Hornets in the Betfred Championship. Smith has also played for the London Broncos in the Super League and the Championship.

=== Featherstone Rovers ===
On 21 Oct 2021 it was reported that he had signed for Featherstone Rovers in the RFL Championship.

=== Wakefield Trinity ===
On 7 October 2022 it was reported that he had signed for Wakefield Trinity in the Super League.

=== Hull FC ===
On 6 October 2023 it was reported that he had signed for Hull F.C. on a two-year deal. Smith made 25 appearances for Hull F.C. in the 2024 Super League season as the club finished 11th on the table.

=== Sheffield Eagles ===
On 22 November 2024, it was reported that he had signed for Sheffield in the RFL Championship on a two-year deal.

=== Oldham RLFC ===
On 11 July 2025 it was reported that he had signed for Oldham RLFC in the RFL Championship
