= Luke Yates =

Australian rugby league footballer

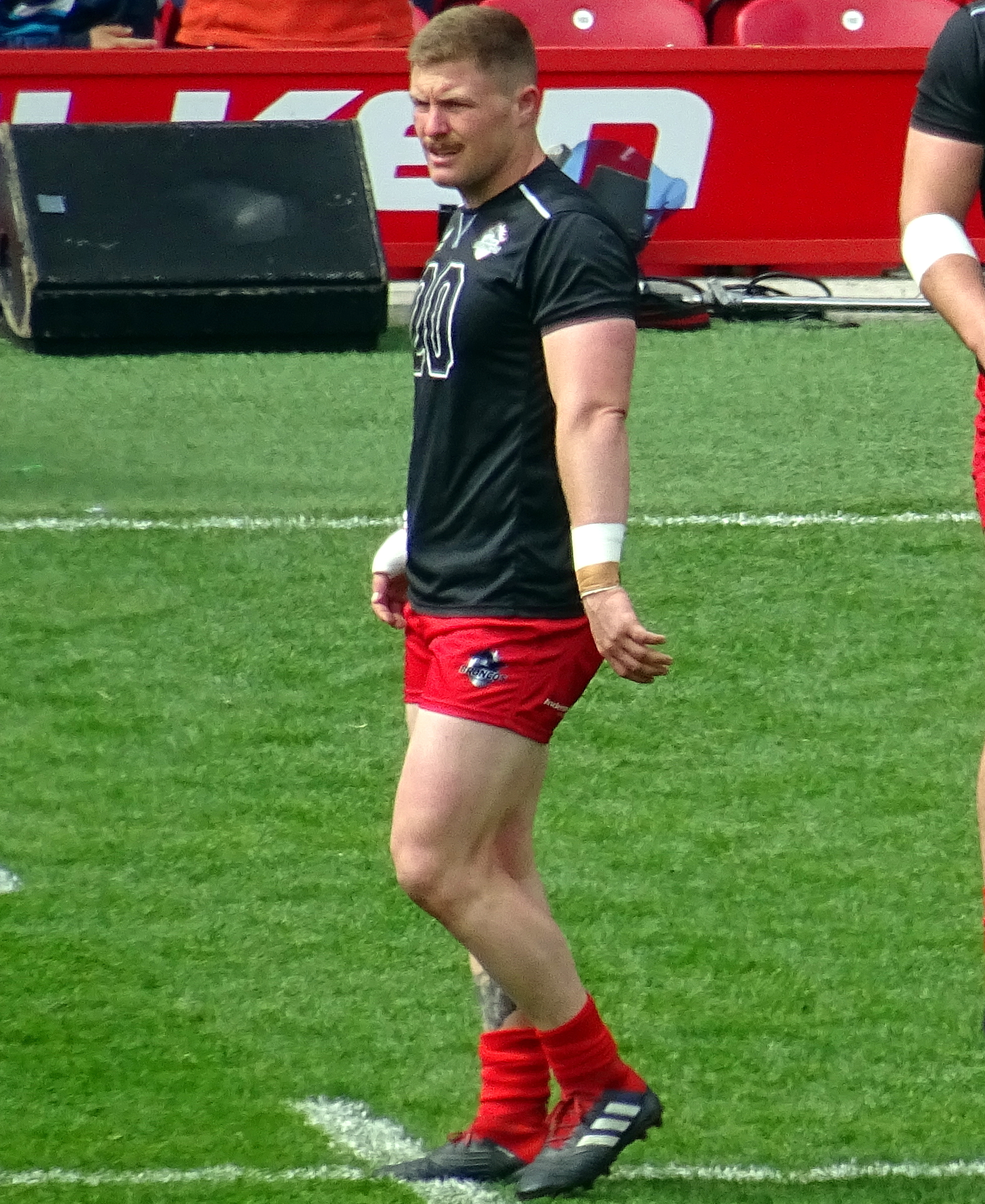

Personal information
- Born: 6 March 1995 (age 31) Newcastle, New South Wales, Australia
- Height: 5 ft 10 in (1.77 m)
- Weight: 14 st 11 lb (94 kg)

Playing information
- Position: Loose forward, Prop, Hooker
Club
Years	Team	Pld	T	G	FG	P
2017–18	Newcastle Knights	25	0	0	0	0
2019	London Broncos	28	2	0	0	8
2020	Salford Red Devils	19	3	0	0	12
2021–24	Huddersfield Giants	89	15	0	0	60
2024(loan)	→Warrington Wolves	11	0	0	0	0
2025–	Warrington Wolves	38	0	0	0	0
	Total	210	20	0	0	80
Representative
Years	Team	Pld	T	G	FG	P
2021	Combined Nations All Stars	1	0	0	0	0
- Source: As of 18 Aug 2024

Luke Yates (born 6 March 1995) is an Australian professional rugby league footballer who plays as a loose forward and prop for the Warrington Wolves in the Super League.

He previously played for the Newcastle Knights in the NRL, and the Huddersfield Giants, the London Broncos and the Salford Red Devils in the Super League.

== Background ==
Yates was born in Newcastle, New South Wales, Australia.

He played his junior rugby league for the Western Suburbs Rosellas, before being signed by the Newcastle Knights.

== Playing career ==
=== Early career ===
From 2013 to 2015, Yates played for the Newcastle Knights' NYC team. In May 2015, he re-signed with the Newcastle club on two-year contract until the end of 2017.

In July 2015, he played for the New South Wales under-20s team against the Queensland under-20s team.

In 2016, he graduated to Newcastle's Intrust Super Premiership NSW team.

=== Newcastle Knights ===
In round 1 of the 2017 NRL season, Yates made his NRL debut for Newcastle against the New Zealand Warriors.

Yates made a total of 19 appearances for Newcastle in his debut year as the club finished with the wooden spoon for a third consecutive year.

In September, he re-signed with Newcastle on a one- contract until the end of 2018. He finished the year with 19 appearances.

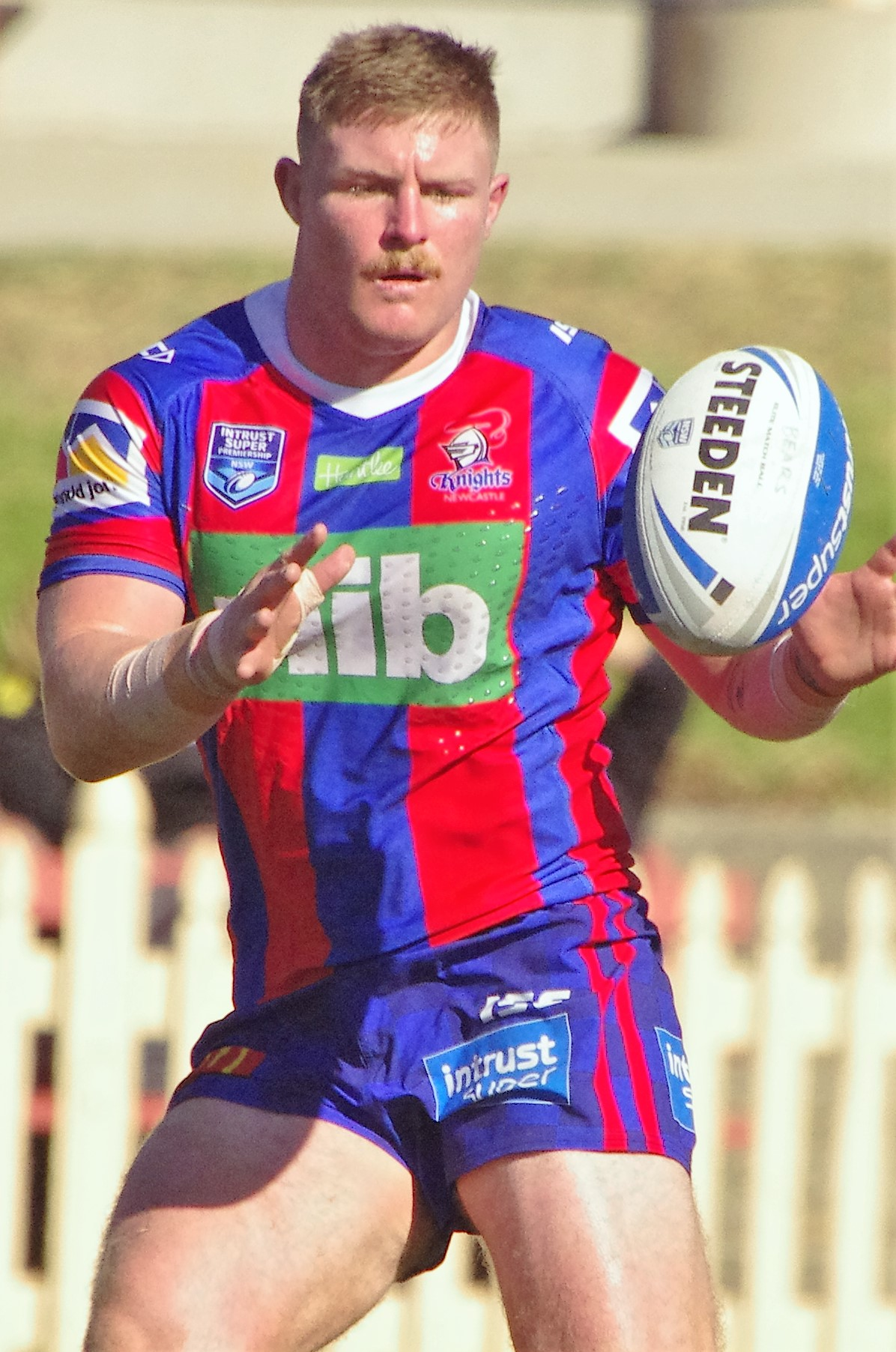
Yates playing for the Newcastle Knights in 2018

Yates only managed to play 6 NRL matches for the Newcastle club in 2018 before parting ways at the end of the season.

=== London Broncos ===
Ahead of the 2019 season, Yates joined the London Broncos in the Super League on a one-year contract.

He was second in the Top Tackler award at the Betfred Super League Awards evening on 6 October 2019, after completing 1211 tackles over the course of 28 games in the 2019 Super League season.

After being relegated from the Super League on points difference, he left the club at the end of his contract.

=== Salford Red Devils ===
Yates signed for Salford from the London Broncos in October 2019. During the 2020 season he signed a two-year contract extension, which would see him through to the end of the 2022 season.

On 17 October 2020, Yates played in the 2020 Challenge Cup Final defeat for Salford against Leeds at Wembley Stadium.

=== Huddersfield Giants ===
On 24 December 2020, it was announced that Yates would join the Huddersfield Giants from the 2021 season. He joined Huddersfield for a significant transfer fee as his Salford contract still had two seasons left to run. He was made team captain for Huddersfield for the 2022 season

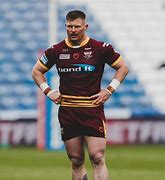
Luke Yates at Huddersfield in 2021

On 28 May 2022, Yates played for Huddersfield in their 2022 Challenge Cup Final loss to Wigan. Yates played 24 matches for Huddersfield in the 2023 Super League season as the club finished ninth on the table and missed the playoffs. Yates played 14 games for Huddersfield in the 2024 Super League season which saw the club finish 9th on the table.

=== Warrington Wolves ===
On 15 July 2024 it was reported that he had signed for Warrington Wolves in the Super League initially on loan until the end of the 2024 season, and then a permanent two-year deal thereafter. On 7 June 2025, Yates played in Warrington's 8-6 Challenge Cup final loss against Hull Kingston Rovers. On 3 October 2026, Yates played in the 2026 Super League Grand Final, which Warrington lost to Wakefield Trinity 23-10.

=== Representative ===
On 25 June 2021 he played for the Combined Nations All Stars in their 26-24 victory over England, staged at the Halliwell Jones Stadium, Warrington, as part of England’s 2021 Rugby League World Cup preparation.
