= Ryan Morgan =

Australian professional footballer (born 1990)

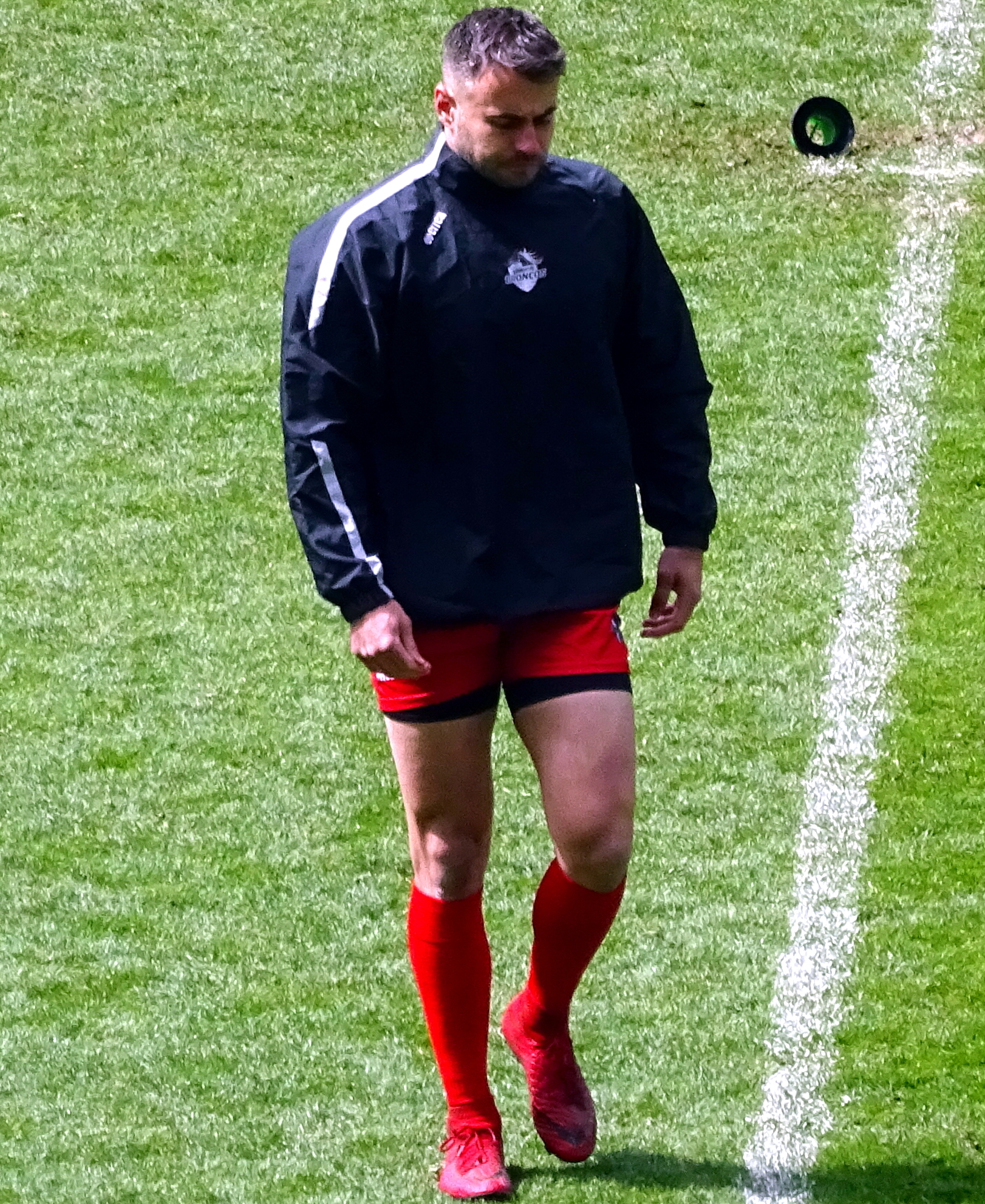

Personal information
- Born: 4 May 1990 (age 36) Liverpool, New South Wales, Australia

Playing information
- Height: 185 cm (6 ft 1 in)
- Weight: 95 kg (14 st 13 lb)
- Position: Centre, Wing
Club
Years	Team	Pld	T	G	FG	P
2011–15	Parramatta Eels	84	29	0	0	116
2016	Melbourne Storm	10	2	0	0	8
2017–19	St Helens	50	24	0	0	96
2019(loan)	→ London Broncos	21	5	0	0	20
	Total	165	60	0	0	240

Ryan Morgan (born 4 May 1990) is an Australian former professional rugby league footballer who played as a centre.

He played for the Parramatta Eels and the Melbourne Storm in the NRL. He played for St Helens in the Super League, spent the 2019 season on-loan from Saints at the London Broncos in the Super League.

== Background ==
Morgan was born in Liverpool, New South Wales, Australia.

He played junior rugby league for Greystanes Devils in the Parramatta Junior Rugby League.

== Playing career ==
Morgan made his NRL debut in round 1 2011 against the New Zealand Warriors at a sell out crowd at Eden Park, he scored his first try in round 4 against the North Queensland Cowboys leaving the field straight after because of injury. Morgan was in and out of first grade in 2011, finishing the season with 14 games and 6 tries as the club narrowly avoided the wooden spoon. He later re-signed with Parramatta until 2013.

In the 2012 NRL season, Morgan made a total of 19 appearances as Parramatta finished last on the table for the first time since 1972. The following year, Morgan again made 19 appearances as Parramatta finished last for a second consecutive year.

In the 2014 NRL season, Morgan played 13 games for Parramatta as the club narrowly missed out on the finals.

On 5 May 2016, Morgan joined the Melbourne Storm effective immediately for the rest of the season, after being granted a release from his Parramatta contract.

On 22 August 2016, Super League club, St. Helens, confirmed the signing of Morgan on a three-year deal.

Morgan made a total of eight appearances for Melbourne in the 2016 NRL season but did not feature in the club's finals campaign or the 2016 NRL Grand Final. After spending two years at St. Helens, Morgan was loaned out to the London Broncos for the Super League XXIV season. Morgan made 22 appearances for London as the club were relegated from the Super League.
