= Danny Ward (rugby league) =

Former GB international rugby league footballer and coach

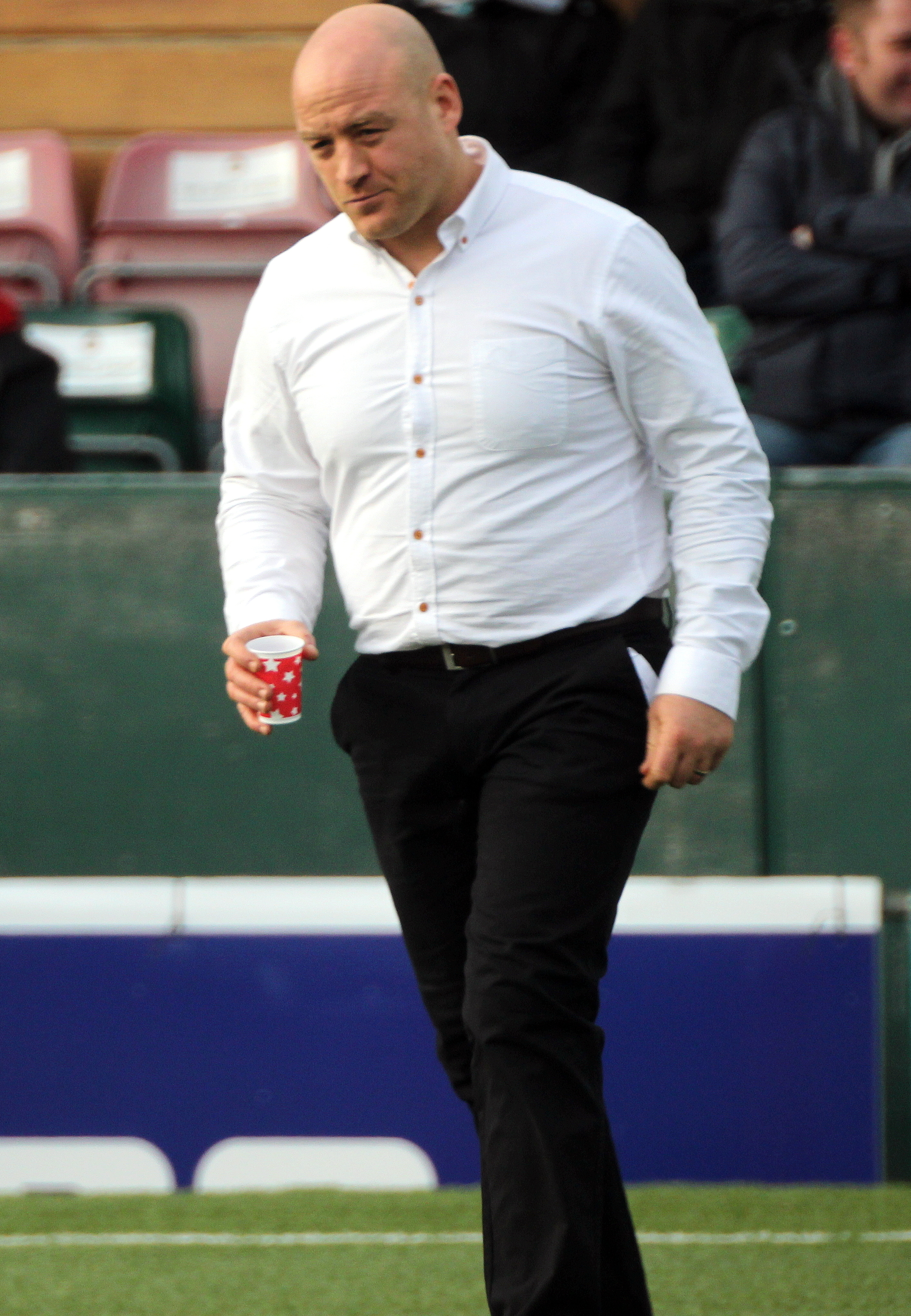

Personal information
- Full name: Daniel Ward
- Born: 15 June 1980 (age 45) Dewsbury, West Yorkshire, England
- Height: 5 ft 10 in (1.78 m)
- Weight: 15 st 10 lb (100 kg)

Playing information
- Position: Prop
Club
Years	Team	Pld	T	G	FG	P
1999–06	Leeds Rhinos	135	10	0	1	41
2006	Castleford Tigers	25	2	0	0	8
2007	Hull Kingston Rovers	21	0	0	0	0
2008–11	Harlequins RL	103	5	0	0	20
	Total	284	17	0	1	69
Representative
Years	Team	Pld	T	G	FG	P
2004	Great Britain	1	0	0	0	0

Coaching information

Rugby league
Club
Years	Team	Gms	W	D	L	W%
2018–21	London Broncos	81	43	2	36	53
2023	Castleford Tigers	6	2	0	4	33
	Total	87	45	2	40	52

Rugby union
Club
Years	Team	Gms	W	D	L	W%
2022–23	Rosslyn Park F.C. (Defence coach)
- Source: As of 8 October 2023

Danny Ward (born 15 June 1980) is an English professional rugby league coach who is the assistant coach of the London Broncos in the Betfred Championship.

Ward is a former professional rugby league footballer who played as a prop forward in the 1990s, 2000s and 2010s. He played for the Leeds Rhinos, Castleford Tigers, Hull Kingston Rovers and Harlequins RL in the Super League, and for Great Britain and England A at international level.

Ward became the head coach of the London Broncos academy side in 2014. The following year he was named first team assistant coach, working under Andrew Henderson. Ward was promoted to head coach for 2018 and oversaw the Broncos' return to the Super League. He departed the club in 2021 and moved into rugby union coaching, before returning to the Super League as the head coach of the Castleford Tigers in 2023.

== Background ==
Ward was born in Dewsbury, West Yorkshire, England. Ward is the son of former Leeds captain and coach David Ward.

== Playing career ==
=== Leeds Rhinos ===
He was signed for Leeds Rhinos from Dewsbury Moor, and he made his début as a substitute against the Sheffield Eagles in 1999. He was named the Leeds Alliance Player of the Year in 2000, before becoming a regular first team member the following season.

Ward emulated his father by playing in the Challenge Cup Final in 2003. In 2004 he made 14 first team starts and 12 substitute appearances, and scored a try in the 46–28 win over Wakefield. Ward played for the Leeds Rhinos at prop in their 2004 Super League Grand Final victory over the Bradford Bulls.

As Super League IX champions, the Rhinos faced 2004 NRL season premiers, the Canterbury-Bankstown Bulldogs in the 2005 World Club Challenge. Ward played as a prop in Leeds' 39–32 victory. In his final season with Leeds, Ward scored a try in the 2005 Challenge Cup Final against Hull and in the Grand Final qualifying win at St. Helens that took the Rhinos back to Old Trafford for the Grand Final. He played for the Rhinos at prop in their 2005 Super League Grand Final loss against Bradford Bulls. He left Leeds before the 2006 Super League season to join Castleford.

=== Castleford Tigers ===
At the beginning of the 2006's Super League XI, Ward was released after an unsavoury incident. He joined the Castleford Tigers, who had just been promoted from National League One. Ward adapted well to his new surroundings and one of his highlights that year was a try in the 31–30 victory over his former employers at the Jungle. However, his efforts were not enough to save Castleford from relegation.

=== Hull Kingston Rovers ===
For the 2007 season, Luke Dyer, a teammate of his at Castleford, moved east to pastures new at Craven Park with Hull Kingston Rovers.

=== Harlequins Rugby League ===
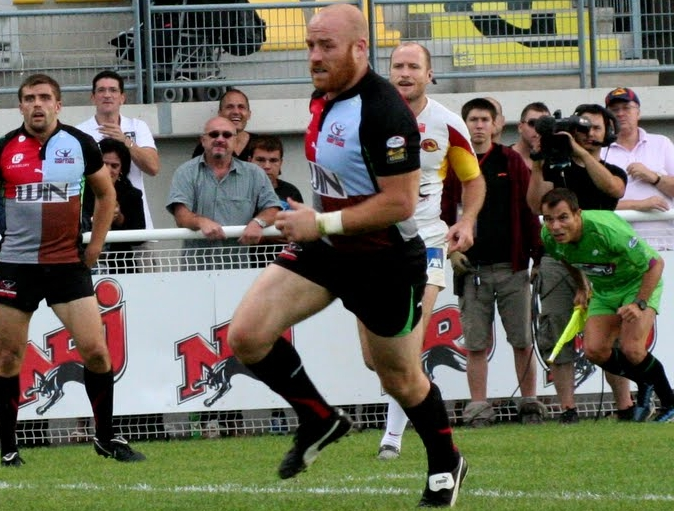
Ward in action for Harlequins RL

He was released from Hull Kingston Rovers on 17 September 2007. He signed a two-year deal with Harlequins starting from the 2008 season.

=== International level ===
Ward first played at international level for the Great Britain Academy before being selected for John Kear's England Under-21 squad for the tour of South Africa at the end of the 2001's Super League VI. England won the first match 112–6, and the second match 74–14. In 2002 he was selected in the England 'A' squad to play New Zealand at Griffin Park, losing 12–34. He then was part of the squad to tour Fiji and Tonga. One of his highlights in 2002 was a drop goal in a victory at the Boulevard on his 21st birthday.

In 2004 Ward made the transition into the senior Great Britain team making his début as a substitute against New Zealand in the Tri Nations competition.

== Coaching career ==
=== London Broncos ===
Ward was the head coach of the London Broncos Under-19s for the 2014 and 2015 seasons. He was the assistant coach in 2015 and 2017.

He was promoted to head coach from the beginning of the 2018 season. Ward took charge of his first professional game with a 56–12 victory over the Barrow Raiders. Danny then, in his first year of being head coach achieved promotion into the super league. Winning 4–2 against the Toronto Wolfpack in the final million pound game.

On 5 July 2021 it was reported that he had left the head coach role by mutual consent.

=== Castleford Tigers ===
On 9 August 2023, Ward was announced as the head coach of the Castleford Tigers for just the remaining six fixtures of the 2023 season. Castleford would finish the season in 11th place, narrowly avoiding relegation.

On 2 October 2023 it was reported that he had rejected taking the role permanently after the end of the 2023 season.

=== Hull KR ===
On 2 November 2023 it was reported that he would join Hull KR as assistant coach on a two-year deal

=== London Broncos assistant coach ===
In October 2025 Danny Ward returned to the club as assistant coach, taking the role after winning the Super League with Hull Kingston Rovers. He returned to the club where he was the head coach for four years, assistant for three years and under 19s coach for two years, as well as spending four years as a player in the capital.
