= 1993–94 London Crusaders season =

- 1993–94 Rank: 3rd
- Challenge Cup: Fourth Round
- 1993–94 record: Wins: 25; draws: 2; losses: 9
- Points scored: For: 842; against: 522

Team information
- Coach: Tony Gordon (Feb 93 - May 94); Gary Greinke (May 94 -)
- Stadium: Barnet Copthall
- Avg. attendance: 837
- High attendance: 1870 vs. Bradford Northern

Top scorers
- Tries: Mark Johnson - 43
- Goals: John Gallagher - 157
- Points: John Gallagher - 384
Home colours
← 1992–93	List of seasons	1994–95 →

The 1993–94 London Crusaders season was the fourteenth in the club's history. It was their third season under the name of the London Crusaders, after more than a decade under the Fulham RLFC name. They competed in the 1993–94 Second Division of the Rugby Football League. They also competed in the 1993–94 Challenge Cup and the 1993–94 League Cup. They finished the season in 3rd place in the second tier of British professional rugby league.

== Second Division table ==
	Team	Pld	W	D	L	PF	PA	PD	Pts
1	Workington Town	30	22	2	6	760	331	+329	46
2	Doncaster	30	22	1	7	729	486	+243	45
3	London Crusaders	30	21	2	7	842	522	+320	44
4	Batley	30	21	1	8	707	426	+281	43
5	Huddersfield	30	20	0	10	661	518	+143	40
6	Keighley	30	19	1	10	856	472	+384	39
7	Dewsbury	30	18	1	11	766	448	+318	37
8	Rochdale Hornets	30	18	0	12	704	532	+6	36
9	Ryedale-York	30	17	1	12	662	516	+146	35
10	Whitehaven	30	14	4	12	571	473	+98	32
11	Barrow	30	13	1	16	581	743	-162	27
12	Swinton	30	11	0	19	528	681	-153	22
13	Carlisle	30	9	0	21	540	878	-338	18
14	Hunslet	30	3	1	26	445	814	-369	7
15	Bramley	30	3	0	27	376	957	-581	6
16	Highfield	30	1	1	28	267	1234	-967	3

Promoted

== Squad statistics ==
Name	Appearances	Tries	Goals	Drop Goals	Points	Notes
Bola Aiyede	1	0	0	0	0	
Richard Blackman	6	2	0	0	8	
Logan Campbell	19	15	0	0	60	
Scott Carter	32	5	0	0	20	
Paul Chambers	2	0	0	0	0	
Leo Dynevor	13	7	0	0	28	
Abi Ekoku	16	8	0	0	32	
John Gallagher	39	17	157	2	384	
Mark Johnson	37	43	0	0	172	
Geoff Luxon	9	1	0	0	4	
Dixon Mcivor	27	4	0	0	16	
Ben Mata'utia	1	0	0	0	0	
Darren Michalski	27	2	0	0	8	
Danny Mulkerin	18	1	0	0	4	
Ian Perryment	4	2	0	0	8	
Neville Ramsey	38	12	0	1	49	
Mark Riley	37	30	0	1	121	
Scott Roskell	33	21	0	0	84	
Steve Rosolen	39	5	0	0	20	
Dave Rotheram	35	0	0	0	0	
Troy Rugless	15	4	0	0	16	
Chris Smith	19	1	0	0	4	
Ady Spencer	2	0	0	0	0	
Sam Stewart	37	4	0	0	16	
Andre Stoop	15	9	0	0	36	
Victor Timms	13	3	0	0	12	
Jason Walker	17	6	0	0	24	
Chris Whiteley	31	0	0	0	0	
