= 1994–95 London Broncos season =

- 1994–95 Rank: 4th
- Challenge Cup: Fourth Round
- 1994–95 record: Wins: 22; draws: 1; losses: 11
- Points scored: For: 732; against: 480

Team information
- Chairman: Barry Maranta
- Coach: Gary Greinke
- Stadium: Barnet Copthall
- Avg. attendance: 744
- High attendance: 1302 vs. Keighley Cougars

Top scorers
- Tries: Scott Roskell - 23
- Goals: John Gallagher - 39
- Points: Scott Roskell - 92
Home colours	Away colours
← 1993–94	List of seasons	1995–96 →

The 1994–95 London Broncos season was the fifteenth in the club's history. It was their first season under the name of the London Broncos, following on from the London Crusaders and Fulham RLFC names. They competed in the 1994–95 Second Division of the Rugby Football League. They also competed in the 1994–95 Challenge Cup and the 1994–95 League Cup. They finished the season in 4th place in the second tier of British professional rugby league.

== Second Division ==
- League: Second Division
- Duration: 30 Matches
- Teams: 16
- Champions: Keighley
- Elected to Championship: London Broncos

The teams finishing in the top 7 went on to form the new First Division with teams from the Championship. London Broncos were fast tracked into the Championship as they were to be part of the new Super League in 1996.

	Team	Pld	W	D	L	PF	PA	PD	Pts	Qualification
1	Keighley	30	23	2	5	974	337	+637	48	1995–96 First Division
2	Batley	30	23	0	7	754	423	+331	46	1995–96 First Division
3	Huddersfield	30	19	3	8	870	539	+230	41	1995–96 First Division
4	London Broncos	30	20	1	9	732	480	+252	41	1995–96 First Division
5	Whitehaven	30	19	0	11	766	507	+259	38	1995–96 First Division
6	Rochdale Hornets	30	18	0	12	805	570	+235	36	1995–96 First Division
7	Dewsbury	30	17	1	12	744	538	+206	35	1995–96 First Division
8	Hull Kingston Rovers	30	16	1	13	824	516	+308	30	1995–96 Second Division
9	Ryedale-York	30	15	2	13	720	602	+118	32	1995–96 Second Division
10	Hunslet	30	16	0	14	611	783	-172	32	1995–96 Second Division
11	Leigh	30	12	0	18	622	787	-165	24	1995–96 Second Division
12	Swinton	30	12	0	18	576	768	-192	24	1995–96 Second Division
13	Bramley	30	10	0	20	554	655	-101	20	1995–96 Second Division
14	Carlisle	30	8	0	22	546	877	-331	16	1995–96 Second Division
15	Barrow	30	6	0	24	449	811	-362	12	1995–96 Second Division
16	Highfield	30	1	0	29	224	1604	-1380	2	1995–96 Second Division

Elected to Championship

== Squad statistics ==
Name	International country	Position	Previous club	Appearances	Tries	Goals	Drop Goals	Points	Notes
Craig Booth	(England)	Prop, Centre	Oldham Roughyeds	7	1	28	0	60	
Justin Bryant	(England)	Second-row		32	6	0	0	24	
Logan Campbell	(Scotland)	Centre, Second-row	Newcastle Knights	13	10	0	0	40	
Bernard Carroll	(Australia)	Wing, Second-row	Balmain Tigers	8	0	0	0	0	
Paul Chambers	(England)	Scrum-half	Rosslyn Park RU	2	0	0	0	0	
Mark Croston	(England)	Hooker	Blackpool Gladiators	2	0	0	0	0	
Sid Domic	(Australia)	Centre	Brisbane Broncos	19	8	0	0	32	
Abi Ekoku	(England)	Wing, Centre	St Marys ARL	11	7	0	0	28	
David Evans	(England)	Prop, Wing, Centre, Fullback	Doncaster	5	3	0	0	12	
John Gallagher	(New Zealand)	Fullback	Leeds	12	2	39	0	86	
Craig Green	(England)	Centre, Fullback		35	11	9	2	64	
David Harvey	(England)			1	0	0	0	0	
Cavill Heugh	(Australia)	Prop, Second-row	Rochdale Hornets	34	4	23	0	62	
Mark Johnson	(South Africa)	Wing	South African RU	31	19	0	0	76	
Kevin Langer	(Australia)	Scrum-half	Ipswich Jets	22	6	0	0	24	
Peter Liddell	(Australia)	Stand-off, Hooker	Wests	30	2	0	0	8	
Geoff Luxon	(England)	Second-row	Crystal Palace ARL	2	0	0	0	0	
Ray McCarthy		Stand-off		2	0	0	0	0	
Dixon McIvor	(England)	Centre, Wing	South London ARL	3	0	0	0	0	
Luke Massey	(Australia)	Hooker, Prop	Cronulla Sharks	26	2	0	0	8	
Darryl Pitt	(England)	Centre	Carlisle	27	14	1	0	58	
Tony Rea	(Australia)	Hooker	North Sydney Bears	12	2	0	0	8	
Mark Riley	(New Zealand)	Scrum-half, Stand-off	Otahuhu Leopards	20	12	0	0	48	
Jason Roach	(Scotland)	Fullback, Wing	St Helens	11	5	0	0	20	
Scott Roskell	(Australia)	Centre, Wing	Gold Coast Seagulls	31	23	0	0	92	
Steve Rosolen	(Australia)	Second-row, Loose forward	North Sydney Bears	15	2	0	0	8	
Dave Rotheram	(England)	Hooker, Prop	West London Institute ARL	25	10	0	0	40	
John Scourfield	(England)	Wing, Fullback		7	5	0	0	20	
Darren Shaw	(Scotland)	Prop, Second-row	Brisbane Broncos	35	0	0	0	0	
Chris Smith	(England)	Second-row	St Marys ARL	11	1	7	0	18	
Paul Stevens	(Australia)	Centre	Wigan	10	1	0	0	4	
Sam Stewart	(New Zealand)	Second-row	Newcastle Knights	35	4	0	0	16	
London Trialist		Fullback		3	0	3	0	6	
Adrian Why	(England)	Second-row, Loose forward	Fulham ARL	1	0	0	0	0	
