= 1995–96 London Broncos season =

- 1995–96 Rank: 10th
- League Cup: Third Round
- 1995–96 record: Wins: 8; draws: 0; losses: 14
- Points scored: For: 443; against: 513

Team information
- Chairman: Barry Maranta
- Coach: Gary Greinke
- Stadium: Griffin Park; Barnet Copthall; Twickenham Stoop; The Valley
- Avg. attendance: 2387
- High attendance: 8338 vs. Wigan

Top scorers
- Tries: Paul Hauff - 13
- Goals: Terry Matterson - 21
- Points: Leo Dynevor - 76
Home colours	Away colours
← 1994–95	List of seasons	1996 →

The 1995–96 London Broncos season was the sixteenth in the rugby league's club's history. It was their second season under the name of the London Broncos, following on from the London Crusaders and Fulham RLFC names. They competed in the 1995–96 Championship of the Rugby Football League. They also competed in the 1995–96 League Cup. They finished the season in 10th place in the top tier of British professional rugby league.

== Championship ==
- League: RFL Championship
- Duration: 20 Matches
- Teams: 11
- Wigan Warriors
- Title: 17th

The top ten teams from the previous season plus the London Broncos competed for the Stones Bitter Centenary League Championship. For the seventh consecutive season, Wigan were crowned League Champions after finishing the season on top of the ladder. In preparation for the forthcoming inaugural Super League season, scheduled to begin in the summer of 1996, no teams were promoted or relegated.

	Team	Pld	W	D	L	PF	PA	PD	Pts
1	Wigan	20	18	0	2	810	316	+494	36
2	Leeds	20	14	0	6	552	405	+147	28
3	Halifax	20	12	1	7	456	463	-7	25
4	St Helens	20	12	0	8	732	508	+224	24
5	Sheffield Eagles	20	10	0	10	482	528	-46	20
6	Castleford	20	9	1	10	448	566	-118	19
7	Bradford Northern	20	8	0	12	418	476	-58	16
8	Oldham	20	8	0	12	382	535	-153	16
9	Warrington	20	7	0	13	443	514	-71	14
10	London Broncos	20	7	0	13	466	585	-119	14
11	Workington Town	20	4	0	16	317	610	-293	8

Champions

== Squad statistics ==
Name	International country	Position	Previous club	Appearances	Tries	Goals	Drop Goals	Points	Notes
Russell Bawden	(Australia)	Second-row	Brisbane Broncos	21	2	0	0	8	
Craig Booth	(England)	Prop, Centre	Oldham Roughyeds	2	0	2	0	4	
Justin Bryant	(England)	Second-row		12	1	0	0	4	
Ikram Butt	(England)	Wing, Centre	Featherstone Rovers	16	4	0	0	16	
Bernard Carroll	(Australia)	Wing, Second-row	Balmain Tigers	3	1	0	0	4	
Evan Cochrane	(Australia)	Wing, Centre	Balmain Tigers	13	6	0	0	24	
Leo Dynevor	(Australia)	Scrum-half, Stand-off		16	9	20	0	76	
David Evans	(England)	Prop, Wing, Centre, Fullback	Doncaster	4	0	0	0	0	
Neil Felton	(England)	Fullback		1	0	0	0	0	
Michael Francis	(Australia)	Second-row	South Sydney Rabbitohs	3	0	0	0	0	
Peter Gill	(Australia)	Second-row, Loose forward	Gold Coast Seagulls	14	1	0	0	4	
Craig Green	(England)	Centre, Fullback		13	2	0	0	8	
Paul Hauff	(Australia)	Fullback	Brisbane Broncos	13	13	0	0	52	
Cavill Heugh	(Australia)	Prop, Second-row	Rochdale Hornets	3	0	0	0	0	
Darren Hogg	(England)	Loose forward		1	0	0	0	0	
Shaun Keating	(Australia)	Second-row, Centre	Brisbane Broncos	8	1	0	0	4	
Kevin Langer	(Australia)	Scrum-half	Ipswich Jets	17	5	0	0	20	
Chris McKenna	(Australia)	Centre	Sheffield Eagles	13	9	0	0	36	
Duncan McRae	(Australia)	Fullback, Stand-off, Scrum-half	South Sydney Rabbitohs	2	3	0	0	12	
Terry Matterson	(Australia)	Loose forward, Hooker	Brisbane Broncos	12	3	21	0	54	
Tony Mestrov	(Australia)	Prop	South Sydney Rabbitohs	17	4	0	0	16	
Kieran Meyer	(Australia)	Centre	Penrith Panthers	5	1	0	0	4	
Paul Mills	(England)	Prop		1	0	0	0	0	
David O'Donnell	(Australia)	Hooker	Sydney City Roosters	12	0	0	0	0	
Julian O'Neill	(Australia)	Stand-off	Widnes	3	0	13	1	27	
Junior Paul	(England)	Wing		1	0	0	0	0	
Darryl Pitt	(England)	Centre	Carlisle	20	1	1	0	6	
Tony Rea	(Australia)	Hooker	North Sydney Bears	11	5	0	0	20	
Mark Riley	(New Zealand)	Scrum-half, Stand-off	Otahuhu Leopards	14	8	0	0	32	
Scott Roskell	(Australia)	Centre, Wing	Gold Coast Seagulls	13	5	0	0	20	
Steve Rosolen	(Australia)	Second-row, Loose forward	North Sydney Bears	17	5	0	0	20	
John Scourfield	(England)	Wing, Fullback		3	2	0	0	8	
Darren Shaw	(Scotland)	Prop, Second-row	Brisbane Broncos	21	1	0	0	4	
Chris Smith	(England)	Second-row	St Marys ARL	3	0	7	0	14	
Paul Stevens	(Australia)	Centre	Wigan	9	1	0	0	4	
Shane Vincent	(Australia)	Centre, Wing	Newcastle Knights	7	5	4	0	28	
Ben Walker	(Australia)	Stand-off	Brisbane Broncos	16	6	5	3	37	
Adrian Why	(England)	Second-row, Loose forward	Fulham ARL	2	0	0	0	0	
