= 1996 London Broncos season =

- Super League I Rank: 4th
- Play-off result: Premiership Trophy semi final
- Challenge Cup: Fourth round
- 1996 record: Wins: 13; draws: 1; losses: 11
- Points scored: For: 635; against: 499

Team information
- Coach: Tony Currie
- Stadium: The Valley
- Avg. attendance: 5,699
- High attendance: 10,014

Top scorers
- Tries: Greg Barwick - 16
- Goals: Greg Barwick - 53
- Points: Greg Barwick - 16
Home colours	Away colours
← 1995–96	List of seasons	1997 →

The 1996 London Broncos season was the seventeenth in the club's history and their first season in the Super League. Coached by Tony Currie, the Broncos competed in Super League I and finished in 4th place. The club also reached the fourth round of the Challenge Cup.

== Super League table ==
Super League I
Pos	Team	Pld	W	D	L	PF	PA	PD	Pts	Qualification or relegation
1	St Helens (C)	22	20	0	2	950	455	+495	40	Qualified for Premiership semi final
2	Wigan	22	19	1	2	902	326	+576	39	Qualified for Premiership semi final
3	Bradford Bulls	22	17	0	5	767	409	+358	34	Qualified for Premiership semi final
4	London Broncos	22	12	1	9	611	462	+149	25	Qualified for Premiership semi final
5	Warrington Wolves	22	12	0	10	569	565	+4	24	
6	Halifax Blue Sox	22	10	1	11	667	576	+91	21	
7	Sheffield Eagles	22	10	0	12	599	730	−131	20	
8	Oldham Bears	22	9	1	12	473	681	−208	19	
9	Castleford Tigers	22	9	0	13	548	599	−51	18	
10	Leeds	22	6	0	16	555	745	−190	12	
11	Paris Saint-Germain	22	3	1	18	398	795	−397	7	
12	Workington Town (R)	22	2	1	19	325	1021	−696	5	Relegated to Division One

Source: Rugby League Project
Rules for classification: 1) Points; 2) Points difference; 3) Number of points scored;
(C) Champions; (R) Relegated

== Super League Play Offs ==
Semifinals
1	St Helens
4	London Broncos
2	Wigan
3	Bradford Bulls

Final
St Helens	14
Wigan	44

== Squad ==
Statistics include appearances and points in the Super League, Challenge Cup and Premiership Trophy.

Player	Apps	Tries	Goals	DGs	Points
Gavin Allen	10	0	0	0	0
Ray Allen	8	3	0	0	12
Greg Barwick	16	16	53	2	172
Russell Bawden	21	3	0	0	12
Michael Brown	2	0	0	0	0
Justin Bryant	16	1	0	0	4
Ikram Butt	6	0	0	0	0
Bernard Carroll	4	2	0	0	8
Evan Cochrane	6	1	0	0	4
Leo Dynevor	21	5	7	0	34
Dave Evans	1	0	0	0	0
Peter Gill	17	7	0	0	28
Darren Hogg	1	0	0	0	0
Shaun Keating	5	0	0	0	0
David Krause	6	2	0	0	8
Kevin Langer	18	2	0	0	8
Leroy Leapai	2	0	0	0	0
Duncan MacRae	14	3	0	1	13
Mark Maguire	14	7	12	0	52
Tony Martin	9	2	0	1	9
Terry Matterson	14	5	25	0	70
Tony Mestrov	23	3	0	0	12
Keiran Meyer	4	1	0	0	4
John Minto	13	4	0	0	16
Martin Offiah	4	3	0	0	12
Junior Paul	4	1	0	0	4
Darryl Pitt	20	4	0	1	17
Tony Rea	24	4	0	0	16
Mark Riley	1	0	0	0	0
Scott Roskell	13	7	0	0	28
Steve Rosolen	18	5	0	0	20
Adam Ross	1	0	0	0	0
Darren Shaw	23	3	0	0	12
Chris Smith	1	0	0	0	0
Danny Smith	3	1	0	0	4
Adrian Spencer	1	0	0	0	0
Paul Stevens	1	0	0	0	0
Graham Strutton	11	4	0	0	16
Tulsen Tollett	23	10	0	0	40
