= 1993–94 Rugby League Divisional Premiership =

1993–94 Divisional Premiership Trophy
- Structure: National knockout championship
- Teams: 8
- Winners: Workington Town
- Runners-up: London Crusaders

The 1993–94 Rugby League Divisional Premiership was the 8th end-of-season Rugby League Divisional Premiership competition.

With the league reduced to two divisions, the competition reverted to its original format and was contested by the top eight teams in the second Division. The winners were Keighley Cougars.

== First round ==
Date	Team one	Score	Team two
8 May 1994	Batley	28–17	Huddersfield
8 May 1994	Doncaster	48–18	Dewsbury
8 May 1994	London Crusaders	66–12	Keighley Cougars
8 May 1994	Workington Town	50–6	Rochdale Hornets

== Semi-finals ==
Date	Team one	Score	Team two
15 May 1994	Doncaster	6–16	London Crusaders
15 May 1994	Workington Town	19–4	Batley

== Final ==
22 May 1994

Workington Town	30 – 22	London Crusaders
Tries: Cocker (2), Byrne, Kay, Drummond, Mulligan; Goals: Marwood (3)		Tries: Johnson (3), Campbell; Goals: Gallagher (3)

Old Trafford, Manchester
Referee: John Connolly (Wigan)
Player of the Match: Dean Marwood

1	Mark Mulligan
2	Des Drummond
3	Tony Kay
4	Paul Burns
5	Stuart Cocker
6	Wayne Kitchin
7	Dean Marwood
8	James Pickering
9	Phil McKenzie
10	Colin Armstrong (c)
11	Brad Hepi
12	Martin Oglanby
13	Ged Byrne
Substitutes:
14	Peter Riley
15	Paul Penrice
Coach:
Peter Walsh

1	Andre Stoop
2	John Gallagher
3	Scott Roskell
4	Logan Campbell
5	Mark Johnson
6	Dixon McIvor
7	Mark Riley
8	Chris Whiteley
9	Scott Carter
10	Dave Rotheram
11	Steve Rosolen
12	Sam Stewart (c)
13	Neville Ramsey
Substitutes:
14	Kris Smith
15	Geoff Luxon
Coach:
Tony Gordon

== See also ==
- 1993–94 Rugby Football League season
