= 1992–93 London Crusaders season =

- 1992–93 Rank: 5th
- Challenge Cup: First Round
- 1992–93 record: Wins: 13; draws: 2; losses: 16
- Points scored: For: 534; against: 562

Team information
- Chairman: Richard Bartram
- Coach: Ross Strudwick (Jun 89 - Feb 93); Tony Gordon (Feb 93 -)
- Stadium: Crystal Palace National Sports Centre
- Avg. attendance: 575
- High attendance: 860 vs. Wakefield Trinity

Top scorers
- Tries: Shane Buckley - 16
- Goals: Kris Smith - 61
- Points: Kris Smith - 130
Home colours	Away colours
← 1991–92	List of seasons	1993–94 →

The 1992–93 London Crusaders season was the thirteenth in the club's history. It was their second season under the name of the London Crusaders, after over a decade under the Fulham RLFC name. They competed in the 1992–93 Second Division of the Rugby Football League. They also competed in the 1993 Challenge Cup, 1992–93 Lancashire Cup and the 1992–93 League Cup. They finished the season in 5th place in the second tier of British professional rugby league.

== Second Division Final Standings ==
	Team	Pld	W	D	L	PF	PA	PD	Pts
1	Featherstone Rovers	28	24	1	3	996	352	644	49
2	Oldham	28	20	1	7	753	503	250	41
3	Huddersfield	28	15	0	13	565	548	17	30
4	Rochdale Hornets	28	14	0	14	622	607	15	28
5	London Crusaders	28	12	2	14	534	562	-28	26
6	Swinton	28	10	0	18	409	636	-227	30
7	Carlisle	28	6	3	19	454	721	-267	15
8	Bramley	28	7	1	20	328	732	-404	13

Promoted	Reformed Second Division

== Squad statistics ==
Name	Appearances	Tries	Goals	Drop Goals	Points	Notes
Dazi Abdurahman	2	1	0	0	4	
Bola Aiyede	1	0	0	0	0	
Colin Atkinson	16	1	0	0	4	
Gary Berney	3	2	0	0	8	
David Bishop	1	0	0	0	0	
Richard Blackman	7	2	0	0	8	
Shane Buckley	29	16	0	0	64	
Alan Burrows	1	0	0	0	0	
Colin Corcoran	3	0	0	0	0	
Roger Draper	1	0	0	0	0	
Matt Dray	17	4	0	0	16	
Darryl Duncan	6	0	0	0	0	
Keith Durham	1	0	0	0	0	
Paul Fisher	29	6	3	1	31	
Bernie Gilbert	6	0	0	0	0	
John Gould	1	0	0	0	0	
Mike Graham	1	0	0	0	0	
Nick Halafihi	31	5	0	0	20	
Kevin Holderness	4	0	0	0	0	
Mark Johnson	5	4	0	0	16	
Jason Kerapa	6	2	0	0	8	
Alan Kimaingatau	3	0	0	0	0	
David King	27	10	0	0	40	
Ian McCarron	10	0	0	0	0	
Grant McKenzie	2	2	0	0	8	
Warren Mann	6	2	0	0	8	
Danny Mulkerin	26	1	0	0	4	
Barry Peart	1	0	0	0	0	
Darryl Pitt	26	9	12	0	60	
Jason Pram	3	0	0	0	0	
Neville Ramsey	6	0	0	0	0	
Mark Riley	22	12	0	1	49	
Scott Roskell	25	10	0	0	40	
Steve Rosolen	30	4	0	0	16	
Dave Rotheram	30	1	0	0	4	
Ian Simpson	12	1	0	0	4	
Chris Smith	29	2	61	0	130	
Andrei Sokolov	2	0	0	0	0	
Ady Spencer	3	1	7	0	18	
Chris Whiteley	6	0	0	0	0	
Adrian Why	1	0	0	0	0	
Tim Wilby	2	1	0	0	4	
Doug Winbourn	2	0	0	0	0	
Chris Winstanley	5	2	0	0	8	
Glen Workman	14	1	0	0	4	
