= 1996 Workington Town season =

- Super League I Rank: 12th (relegated)
- Challenge Cup: 4th round
- 1996 record: Wins: 2; draws: 1; losses: 19
- Points scored: For: 325; against: 1021

Team information
- Coach: Kurt Sorensen (until March 1996); Ross O'Reilly (from March 1996)
- Captain: Billy McGinty
- Stadium: Derwent Park

Top scorers
- Tries: John Allen, James Chilton - 6
- Goals: Dean Marwood - 23
- Points: Wayne Kitchin – 47

The 1996 Workington Town season was the club's first season in the newly formed Super League. Coached by Ross O'Reilly, who replaced Kurt Sorensen in March 1996, and captained by Billy McGinty, Workington competed in Super League I and finished in 12th place, resulting in relegation to the First Division. The club also competed in the 1996 Challenge Cup, but were knocked out in the fourth round by First Division side Widnes.

== Table ==
Super League I
Pos	Team	Pld	W	D	L	PF	PA	PD	Pts	Qualification or relegation
1	St Helens (C)	22	20	0	2	950	455	+495	40	Qualified for Premiership semi final
2	Wigan	22	19	1	2	902	326	+576	39	Qualified for Premiership semi final
3	Bradford Bulls	22	17	0	5	767	409	+358	34	Qualified for Premiership semi final
4	London Broncos	22	12	1	9	611	462	+149	25	Qualified for Premiership semi final
5	Warrington Wolves	22	12	0	10	569	565	+4	24	
6	Halifax Blue Sox	22	10	1	11	667	576	+91	21	
7	Sheffield Eagles	22	10	0	12	599	730	−131	20	
8	Oldham Bears	22	9	1	12	473	681	−208	19	
9	Castleford Tigers	22	9	0	13	548	599	−51	18	
10	Leeds	22	6	0	16	555	745	−190	12	
11	Paris Saint-Germain	22	3	1	18	398	795	−397	7	
12	Workington Town (R)	22	2	1	19	325	1021	−696	5	Relegated to Division One

Source: Rugby League Project
Rules for classification: 1) Points; 2) Points difference; 3) Number of points scored;
(C) Champions; (R) Relegated

== Match results ==
Win	Draw	Loss

=== Super League ===
Game	Date	Opponent	Venue	Score	Tries	Goals	Attendance	Ref
1	31 March 1996	St. Helens	Home	0–62			3,461	MR
2	5 April 1996	Warrington Wolves	Away	30–45	Armstrong, Palmada, Chilton (2), Campbell	Marwood (5)	4,511	MR
3	8 April 1996	Sheffield Eagles	Home	22–54	Allen, L. Smith, Phillips	Marwood (5)	1,904	MR
4	13 April 1996	Paris Saint-Germain	Away	12–34	Burns, Wallace	Marwood (2)	6,534	MR
5	21 April 1996	London Broncos	Away	0–58			4,138	MR
6	6 May 1996	Halifax Blue Sox	Home	18–18	L. Smith, Wallace, Kitchin	Marwood (3)	2,215	MR
7	12 May 1996	Castleford Tigers	Away	16–50	Nairn, Penrice, Kitchin	Marwood (2)	3,605	MR
8	18 May 1996	Wigan Warriors	Home	16–64	Allen, Holgate, L. Smith	Marwood (2)	3,176	MR
9	26 May 1996	Oldham Bears	Away	29–27	Palmada, L. Smith, Wallace, Filipo	Marwood (3), Kitchin (3) + 1 DG	2,228	MR
10	2 June 1996	Bradford Bulls	Away	4–52	Allen		8,658	MR
11	9 June 1996	Leeds Rhinos	Home	18–48	Johnson, Chilton, Filipo	Kitchin (3)	2,949	MR
12	16 June 1996	St. Helens	Away	16–60	Allen, Holgate, Keenan	Carter, J. Smith	7,237	MR
13	23 June 1996	London Broncos	Home	6–34	Chilton	Kitchin	1,400	MR
14	29 June 1996	Sheffield Eagles	Away	16–32	Nairn, T. Smith	Kitchin (4)	3,468	MR
15	7 July 1996	Paris Saint-Germain	Home	14–10	Filipo	Kitchin (5)	2,173	MR
16	14 July 1996	Warrington Wolves	Home	4–49	Allen		2,269	MR
17	21 July 1996	Halifax Blue Sox	Away	14–74	Chilton, Kitchin, Armswood	Kitchin	4,374	MR
18	28 July 1996	Castleford Tigers	Home	20–46	Allen, Grima, Johnson	Watson (4)	1,622	MR
19	4 August 1996	Oldham Bears	Home	24–30	Holgate, Nairn, Penrice, Watson	Watson (4)	1,759	MR
20	11 August 1996	Bradford Bulls	Home	14–28	Bethwaite, Chilton	Watson (3)	2,430	MR
21	18 August 1996	Leeds Rhinos	Away	28–68	Fatnowna (2), Grima, Johnson, Nairn	Watson (4)	4,956	MR
22	24 August 1996	Wigan Warriors	Away	4–78	Johnson		6,466	MR

=== Challenge Cup ===
Round	Date	Opponent	Venue	Score	Tries	Goals	Attendance	Ref
Fourth	28 January 1996	Widnes	Home	10–17	L. Smith, Wallace	Marwood	2,339	MR

== Squad ==
Player	Apps	Tries	Goals	DGs	Points
John Allen	22	6	0	0	24
Colin Armstrong	13	1	0	0	4
Richard Armswood	6	1	0	0	4
Craig Barker	2	0	0	0	0
Mike Bethwaite	20	1	0	0	4
Paul Burns	8	1	0	0	4
Logan Campbell	9	1	0	0	4
Darren Carter	14	0	1	0	2
Lee Chilton	13	6	0	0	24
Nicky Crellin	2	0	0	0	0
Abraham Fatnowna	5	2	0	0	8
Lafaele Filipo	20	3	0	0	12
David Fraisse	8	0	0	0	0
Jonathan Gorley	1	0	0	0	0
Andrew Grima	11	2	0	0	8
Stephen Holgate	20	3	0	0	12
Stuart Howarth	2	0	0	0	0
Mark Johnson	12	4	0	0	16
Mark Keenan	8	1	0	0	4
Wayne Kitchin	17	3	17	1	47
Peter Livett	5	0	0	0	0
Billy McGinty	1	0	0	0	0
Gary McGuirk	4	0	0	0	0
Phil McKenzie	4	0	0	0	0
Dean Marwood	16	0	23	0	46
Jason Moore	5	0	0	0	0
Brad Nairn	14	4	0	0	16
Jason Palmada	13	2	0	0	8
Paul Penrice	14	2	0	0	8
Adrian Petrie	1	0	0	0	0
Rowland Phillips	23	1	0	0	4
Lee Prest	1	0	0	0	0
Peter Riley	12	0	0	0	0
Garry Schubert	1	0	0	0	0
Jamie Smith	8	0	1	0	2
Leigh Smith	10	5	0	0	20
Tony Smith	9	1	0	0	4
Dylan Stainton	5	0	0	0	0
Mark Stamper	1	0	0	0	0
Mark Wallace	16	4	0	0	16
Ian Watson	5	1	15	0	34
Andrew Whalley	2	0	0	0	0

== Transfers ==
=== In ===
Player	Pos	From	Fee	Date	Ref
Tony Smith	Stand-off	St. George Dragons		April 1996	
Brad Nairn	Loose forward	Parramatta Eels		April 1996	

=== Out ===
Player	Pos	To	Fee	Date	Ref
Stephen Holgate	Second-row	Wigan Warriors	£100,000	December 1996	
