= 1990–91 Fulham RLFC season =

- 1990–91 Rank: 7th
- Challenge Cup: First Round
- 1990–91 record: Wins: 18; draws: 2; losses: 12
- Points scored: For: 450; against: 338

Team information
- Chairman: Ray Stoner
- Coach: Ross Strudwick
- Stadium: Crystal Palace National Sports Centre
- Avg. attendance: 496
- High attendance: 844 vs. Batley

Top scorers
- Tries: Darryl Pitt - 10
- Goals: Greg Pearce - 74
- Points: Greg Pearce - 168
← 1989–90	List of seasons	1991–92 →

The 1990–91 Fulham RLFC season was the eleventh in the club's history. They competed in the 1990–91 Second Division of the Rugby Football League. They also competed in the 1991 Challenge Cup, 1990–91 Lancashire Cup and the 1990–91 League Cup. They finished the season in 7th place in the second tier of British professional rugby league.

== Second Division Final Standings ==
	Team	Pld	W	D	L	PF	PA	PD	Pts
1	Salford	28	26	1	1	856	219	637	53
2	Halifax	28	24	0	4	941	311	630	48
3	Swinton	28	21	2	5	523	347	176	44
4	Ryedale-York	28	20	2	6	559	394	165	42
5	Leigh	28	18	1	9	698	372	326	37
6	Workington Town	28	18	1	9	497	323	174	37
7	Fulham	28	17	2	9	450	338	112	36
8	Carlisle	28	16	2	10	613	425	188	34
9	Doncaster	28	16	0	12	207	434	-227	32
10	Hunslet	28	13	2	13	519	438	81	28
11	Huddersfield	28	13	1	14	493	477	16	27
12	Whitehaven	28	13	0	15	412	592	-180	26
13	Keighley	28	12	0	16	456	588	-132	24
14	Dewsbury	28	10	1	17	410	455	-45	21
15	Trafford Borough	28	10	0	18	508	618	-110	20
16	Batley	28	10	0	18	337	466	-129	20
17	Barrow	28	8	2	18	415	705	-290	18
18	Chorley Borough	28	7	1	20	388	721	-333	15
19	Bramley	28	7	1	20	379	726	-347	15
20	Runcorn Highfield	28	3	1	24	351	779	-428	7
21	Nottingham City	28	2	0	26	284	945	-661	4

Promoted

== Squad statistics ==
Name	Appearances	Tries	Goals	Drop Goals	Points	Notes
Dazi Abdurahman	6	1	0	0	4	
Russell Browning	23	4	0	0	16	
Steve Callow	6	0	0	0	0	
Lachlan Churchill	8	1	0	0	4	
Colin Corcoran	10	0	0	0	0	
David Cruickshank	14	3	0	0	12	
Tim Dwyer	20	3	27	0	66	
Craig Grauf	28	7	0	2	30	
Kevin Holderness	2	0	0	0	0	
Lawrence Johanneson	6	0	0	0	0	
Noel Keating	24	0	0	0	0	
Mark Lee	22	7	0	0	28	
Roy Leslie	20	4	0	0	16	
Tim Look	16	3	0	0	12	
Greg Manthey	6	2	0	0	8	
Hussein M'Barki	21	7	0	0	28	
Ian Mellors	29	3	0	0	12	
Shaun Mohr	7	4	0	0	16	
Keiron Murphy	13	3	0	0	12	
Mick Noble	9	2	0	0	8	
Greg Pearce	24	5	74	0	168	
Barry Peart	1	0	0	0	0	
Darryl Pitt	16	10	0	0	40	
Peter Reinsfield	12	0	0	0	0	
Steve Roberts	7	0	0	0	0	
Dave Rotheram	32	2	0	0	8	
Adam Sada	3	1	0	0	4	
Richard Scarlett	8	1	0	0	4	
Conrad Scott	7	0	0	0	0	
Andy Stevens	15	4	1	0	18	
Mick Taylor	29	5	0	0	20	
Brent Wilkins	17	1	0	0	4	
Bernie Wilkinson	1	1	0	0	4	
Doug Winbourn	12	1	0	0	4	
Chris Winstanley	15	0	0	0	0	
Robert Wright	5	0	0	0	0	
