= 1991–92 London Crusaders season =

- 1991–92 Rank: 4th
- Challenge Cup: Second Round
- 1991–92 record: Wins: 15; draws: 1; losses: 17
- Points scored: For: 428; against: 433

Team information
- Coach: Ross Strudwick
- Stadium: Crystal Palace National Sports Centre
- Avg. attendance: 755
- High attendance: 1893 vs. Wigan

Top scorers
- Tries: Shane Buckley - 17
- Goals: Chris Smith - 78
- Points: Chris Smith - 168
← 1990–91	List of seasons	1992–93 →

The 1991–92 London Crusaders season was the twelfth in the club's history. It was their first season under the name of the London Crusaders, after a decade under the Fulham RLFC name. They competed in the 1991–92 Second Division of the Rugby Football League. They also competed in the 1992 Challenge Cup, 1991–92 Lancashire Cup and the 1991–92 League Cup. They finished the season in 4th place in the second tier of British professional rugby league.

== Second Division Final Standings ==
	Team	Pld	W	D	L	PF	PA	PD	Pts
1	Sheffield Eagles	28	21	1	6	816	396	420	43
2	Leigh	28	21	0	7	617	401	216	42
3	Oldham	28	18	2	8	558	421	137	38
4	London Crusaders	28	14	0	14	428	483	-55	28
5	Rochdale Hornets	28	12	2	14	619	489	130	26
6	Carlisle	28	12	1	15	490	466	24	25
7	Ryedale-York	28	5	2	21	338	749	-411	12
8	Workington Town	28	4	2	22	310	77	233	10

Promoted	Relegated

== Squad statistics ==
Name	Appearances	Tries	Goals	Drop Goals	Points	Notes
Dazi Abdurahman	1	-	-	0	-	
Colin Atkinson	26	5	-	0	20	
Ben Beevers	9	-	-	0	-	
Gary Berney	5	2	-	0	8	
Wayne Boyle	1	-	-	0	-	
Russell Browning	3	-	-	0	-	
Shane Buckley	34	17	-	0	68	
Lachlan Churchill	33	7	-	0	28	
Colin Corcoran	10	-	-	0	-	
Crompton	1	-	-	0	-	
Gary Deaker	24	5	-	0	20	
Matt Dray	23	1	-	0	4	
Bernie Gilbert	16	2	-	0	8	
Nick Halafihi	18	3	-	0	12	
Kevin Holderness	1	-	-	0	-	
Hussein M'Barki	4	1	-	0	4	
Ben Olsen	30	3	-	0	12	
Ray Ovens	4	1	-	0	4	
Darryl Pitt	33	12	11	0	70	
John Plath	16	5	-	0	20	
Steve Roberts	2	-	-	0	-	
Francis Rolls	2	-	-	0	-	
Steve Rosolen	27	5	-	0	20	
Dave Rotheram	26	-	-	0	-	
Richard Scarlett	1	-	-	0	-	
Conrad Scott	2	-	-	0	-	
Andy Shaw	4	-	-	0	-	
Ian Simpson	1	-	-	0	-	
Chris Smith	31	3	78	0	168	
Mick Taylor	27	2	-	0	8	
Adrian Why	1	-	-	0	-	
Tim Wilby	26	-	-	0	-	
Brent Wilkins	19	-	-	0	-	
Bernie Wilkinson	12	7	-	0	28	
Doug Winbourn	4	-	-	0	-	
Jason Wing	12	2	-	0	8	
Chris Winstanley	9	1	-	0	4	
Glen Workman	27	-	-	0	-	
