= Michael France (disambiguation) =

Michael France was a film screenwriter.

Michael France may also refer to:

- Michael Paul France (born 1968), British footballer
- Mike France (politician) (born 1962), former member of the Connecticut House of Representatives

== See also ==
- Michael Francis (disambiguation)
- Michael French (disambiguation)
