= 1993–94 Rugby Football League season =

- League: Championship
- Duration: 30 Rounds
- Teams: First Division: 16; Second Division: 16
- Broadcast partners: Sky Sports

First Division
- Champions: Wigan (15th title)
- Premiership winners: Wigan
- Man of Steel: Jonathan Davies

Promotion and relegation
- Relegated to Second Division: Hull Kingston Rovers; Leigh

Second Division
- Champions: Workington Town

Promotion and relegation
- Promoted from Second Division: Workington Town; Doncaster

The 1993–94 Rugby Football League season was the 99th ever season of professional rugby league football in Britain. Sixteen teams competed from August 1993 until May 1994 for a number of titles, primarily the Stones Bitter Championship.

== Season summary ==
- Stones Bitter League Champions: Wigan (15th title)
- Silk Cut Challenge Cup Winners: Wigan (26-16 v Leeds)
- Stones Bitter Premiership Trophy Winners: Wigan (24-20 v Castleford)
  - Harry Sunderland Trophy: Sam Panapa
- Regal Trophy Winners: Castleford (33-2 v Wigan)
- 2nd Division Champions: Workington Town

The 1994 Man of Steel Award for player of the season went to Warrington's Jonathan Davies.

This season saw the highest ever away victory in the league when Keighley Cougars beat Highfield 104-4 at the Rochdale Hornets ground on 23 April.

This was the first season since the 1905–06 inaugural season of the Lancashire County Cup and Yorkshire County Cup, except for the break for World War I and World War II (Lancashire Cup only), that the Lancashire Cup and Yorkshire Cup competitions had not taken place.

== Tables ==
=== First Division ===
Wigan, Bradford Northern and Warrington all finished the season on top of the ladder with 46 points, but Wigan's superior points differential saw them crowned League Champions for the fifth consecutive time. This earned them the right to travel to Australia at the close of the season and contest the 1994 World Club Challenge. Wigan defeated the Brisbane Broncos and confirmed their position as the dominant rugby league club of the year.

After finishing in second last and last place respectively, Hull Kingston Rovers and Leigh were demoted to the Second Division.

Pos	Team	Pld	W	D	L	PF	PA	PD	Pts	Qualification or relegation
1	Wigan (C)	30	23	0	7	780	403	+377	46	Qualification for the Premiership first round
2	Bradford Northern	30	23	0	7	784	555	+229	46	Qualification for the Premiership first round
3	Warrington	30	23	0	7	628	430	+198	46	Qualification for the Premiership first round
4	Castleford	30	19	1	10	787	466	+321	39	Qualification for the Premiership first round
5	Halifax	30	17	2	11	682	581	+101	36	Qualification for the Premiership first round
6	Sheffield Eagles	30	16	2	12	704	671	+33	34	Qualification for the Premiership first round
7	Leeds	30	15	2	13	673	680	−7	32	Qualification for the Premiership first round
8	St Helens	30	15	1	14	704	537	+167	31	Qualification for the Premiership first round
9	Hull F.C.	30	14	2	14	536	530	+6	30	
10	Widnes	30	14	0	16	523	642	−119	28	
11	Featherstone Rovers	30	13	1	16	651	681	−30	27	
12	Salford	30	11	0	19	554	650	−96	22	
13	Oldham	30	10	1	19	552	651	−99	21	
14	Wakefield Trinity	30	9	1	20	458	708	−250	19	
15	Hull Kingston Rovers (R)	30	9	0	21	493	782	−289	18	Relegation to Second Division
16	Leigh (R)	30	2	1	27	370	912	−542	5	Relegation to Second Division

Rules for classification: 1) Points; 2) Points difference; 3) Number of points scored;
(C) Champions; (R) Relegated

=== Second Division ===
Pos	Team	Pld	W	D	L	PF	PA	PD	Pts	Promotion, qualification or relegation
1	Workington Town (C, P)	30	22	2	6	760	331	+429	46	Promoted to First Division; Qualified for Divisional Premiership first round
2	Doncaster (P)	30	22	1	7	729	486	+243	45	Promoted to First Division; Qualified for Divisional Premiership first round
3	London Crusaders	30	21	2	7	842	522	+320	44	Qualified for Divisional Premiership first round
4	Batley	30	21	1	8	707	426	+281	43	Qualified for Divisional Premiership first round
5	Huddersfield	30	20	0	10	661	518	+143	40	Qualified for Divisional Premiership first round
6	Keighley Cougars	30	19	1	10	856	472	+384	39	Qualified for Divisional Premiership first round
7	Dewsbury	30	18	1	11	766	448	+318	37	Qualified for Divisional Premiership first round
8	Rochdale Hornets	30	18	0	12	704	532	+172	36	Qualified for Divisional Premiership first round
9	Ryedale-York	30	17	1	12	662	516	+146	35	
10	Whitehaven	30	14	4	12	571	437	+134	32	
11	Barrow	30	13	1	16	581	743	−162	27	
12	Swinton	30	11	0	19	528	681	−153	22	
13	Carlisle	30	9	0	21	540	878	−338	18	
14	Hunslet	30	3	1	26	445	814	−369	7	
15	Bramley	30	3	0	27	376	957	−581	6	
16	Highfield	30	1	1	28	267	1234	−967	3	

Rules for classification: 1) Points; 2) Points difference; 3) Number of points scored;
(C) Champions; (P) Promoted

== Challenge Cup ==
The Silk Cut Challenge Cup Final was played between Wigan and Leeds on a Saturday afternoon, 30 April 1994 at Wembley Stadium, before a crowd of 78,348. Bonnie Tyler lead the community singing at the match. Wigan's Martin Offiah opened the scoring with a ninety-plus metre try, and went on to win the game 26–16.

== Statistics ==
The following are the top points scorers in the 1993–94 season.

Most tries

Player	Team	Tries
Mark Johnson	London Crusaders	43
St John Ellis	Castleford	40
Paul Newlove	Bradford Northern	37
Martin Offiah	Wigan	37
Stuart Cocker	Workington Town	35
Nick Pinkney	Keighley Cougars	31
Mark Riley	London Crusaders	30
Carl Hall	Bradford Northern	27
Darren Moxon	Batley	27
Jason Critchley	Salford	25
John Bentley	Halifax	25
Ellery Hanley	Leeds	25

Most goals (including drop goals)

Player	Team	Goals
Frano Botica	Wigan	188
John Gallagher	London Crusaders	159
Deryck Fox	Bradford Northern	148
Lee Crooks	Castleford	137
Jonathan Davies	Warrington	132
Mark Conway	Dewsbury	130
Robert Turner	Doncaster	123
Mark Aston	Sheffield Eagles	123
Graham Holroyd	Leeds	103
Dean Marwood	Workington Town	100

== Sources ==
- 1993–94 Rugby Football League season at rlhalloffame.org.uk
- 1993–94 Rugby Football League season at wigan.rlfans.com
- Wigan's record Cup run at news.bbc.co.uk
- Great Britain Competitions 1993-1994 at hunterlink.net.au
- Championship 1993/94 at rugbyleagueproject.org
