= Moondance (disambiguation) =

Moondance is a 1970 album by Van Morrison.

Moondance may also refer to:

== Events ==
- Moondance International Film Festival, an annual film competition in Boulder, Colorado
- Moondance Jam, a classic rock festival in Minnesota

== Music ==
- "Moondance" (Van Morrison song), a song from the album of same name
- "Moondance", an instrumental by Nightwish from the album Oceanborn
- "Moon Dance", a song by Andreas Vollenweider from the 1986 album Down to the Moon
- Moondancer, a 1979 album by Meco

== Other ==
- Moondance (film), a 1995 Irish drama film
- "Moon Dance" (Frasier), an episode in the third season of the sitcom Frasier
- Moondance (magazine), a women's literature and arts journal
- Moondance Diner, a New York landmark
- MS Moondance, a ferry

== See also ==
- Dancing at the Harvest Moon, a 2001 television film
- The Moondancers, a fictional DC Comics team
