= Caverna Magica =

Studio album by Andreas Vollenweider
- Released: November 1, 1982
- Recorded: May–November 1982
- Genres: New-age, space music
- Length: 33:30
- Label: Columbia
- Producer: Andreas Vollenweider

Andreas Vollenweider chronology
Behind the Gardens - Behind the Wall - Under the Tree (1981)	Caverna Magica (1982)	White Winds (1984)

Caverna Magica is the second studio album by new-age artist Andreas Vollenweider, released in 1982. It is almost entirely instrumental. It was the direct follow up to Vollenweider's breakthrough album, Behind the Gardens.

== Reception ==
Professional ratings
Review scores
Source	Rating
Allmusic	5/5 stars

== Track listing ==
All music by Andreas Vollenweider.

No.	Title	Length
1.	"Caverna Magica"	3:52
2.	"Mandragora"	3:03
3.	"Lunar Pond"	2:18
4.	"Schajah Saretosh"	3:17
5.	"Sena Stanjéna?"	2:28
6.	"Belladonna"	5:21
7.	"Angóh!"	2:45
8.	"Huiziopochtli"	5:06
9.	"Con Chiglia"	2:49
10.	"Geastrum Coronatum"	1:43
11.	"La Paix Verde"	0:48

== Personnel ==
- Andreas Vollenweider - Vocals, Harp, Keyboards, Guzheng, Flute
- Erdal Kızılçay - Keyboards, Oud
- Walter Keiser - Drums
- Andi Pupato - Percussion
- Roger Bonnot- Sound effects
- Corin Curschellas - Voices
- Darryl Pitt - Photography
- David Alan Kogut - Art Direction
