= Michael Francis =

Michael Francis may refer to:

- Michael Francis (athlete) (born 1970), retired Puerto Rican long jumper
- Michael Francis (footballer) (1947–2019), Australian rules footballer
- Michael Francis (rugby league) (born 1974), Australian rugby league footballer
- Michael Kpakala Francis (1936–2013), Roman Catholic Archbishop of Monrovia
- Michael Francis (conductor) (born 1976), British conductor
- Mike Francis (1961–2009), Italian musician
- Mike Francis (politician) (born 1946), chairman of the Republican Party in Louisiana
- J. Michael Francis (born 1968), historian of Florida

== See also ==
- Michael Francies (born 1956), British solicitor
- Michael France (disambiguation)
