= Behind the Gardens =

Behind the Gardens - Behind the Wall - Under the Tree...

Studio album by Andreas Vollenweider
- Released: September 14, 1981
- Genre: New-age
- Label: Columbia
- Producers: Hugo Faas, Vera Brandes

Andreas Vollenweider chronology
Eine Art Suite in XIII Teilen (1979)	Behind the Gardens - Behind the Wall - Under the Tree... (1981)	Caverna Magica (1982)

Professional ratings
Review scores
Source	Rating
Allmusic	4/5 stars

Behind the Gardens – Behind the Wall – Under the Tree . . . . is a studio album by new-age artist Andreas Vollenweider, released in 1981. It is almost entirely instrumental, and centers on Vollenweider on harp.

== History ==
While not Vollenweider's first album, Behind the Gardens is often regarded as such because it was his first album to receive wide recognition. The earlier and more obscure Eine Art Suite in XIII Teilen (A sort of Suite in 13 Parts), 1979, is now mainly available online, while Behind the Gardens is still on sale in music stores.

The second track, "Pyramid", is a favorite among fans and has become a concert staple.

In 1990 the album was re-released as a two-CD set with the two following albums, Caverna Magica and White Winds, entitled Trilogy. The full titles of the first two albums indicate that the three albums are thematically connected; the full title of the next album is Caverna Magica (...Under the Tree – In the Cave...). Vollenweider has said that the title of the album is meant to be directions: "You will find us behind The Garden, behind The Wall, under The Tree...".

== Track listing ==
All tracks are written by Andreas Vollenweider.

Original 1981 vinyl and original CBS Sony CD 1981 release
No.	Title	Length
1.	"Behind the Gardens-Behind the Wall-Under the Tree"	7:19
2.	"Pyramid-In the Wood-In the Bright Light"	7:52
3.	"Micro-Macro"	2:49
4.	"Skin and Skin"	3:22
5.	"Moonlight, Wrapped Around Us"	1:03
6.	"Lion and Sheep"	2:56
7.	"Sunday"	1:57
8.	"Afternoon"	0:47
9.	"Hands and Clouds"	2:24
Total length:		30:29

2005 CD re-issue bonus tracks
No.	Title	Length
10.	"Vergeletto" (Live 1982)	3:59
11.	"XIII" (from "Eine Art Suite in XIII Teilen", 1979)	2:22
12.	"The Letter" (from "Eine Art Suite in XIII Teilen", 1979)	1:44
13.	"Little Boy and the Mirror" (from "Eine Art Suite in XIII Teilen", 1979)	3:09
14.	"Hey You, Yes… You! (At The Gate Of Sound)" (from VOX, 2005)	4:56
Total length:		46:39

== Personnel ==
Personnel on the original "Behind the Gardens":

- Andreas Vollenweider – Harp, Guitars, Saxophone, Synthesizers
- Walter Keiser – Drums
- Jon Otis, Pedro Haldemann – Percussion
