= Darryl Duncan =

Australian rugby league footballer

Personal information
- Full name: Darryl Duncan
- Born: 3 December 1962 (age 63) Australia

Playing information
- Position: Stand-off, Second-row
Club
Years	Team	Pld	T	G	FG	P
1980–82	Fortitude Valley Diehards	0	0	0	0	0
1983	Illawarra Steelers	0	0	0	0	0
1983–84	Fortitude Valley Diehards	0	0	0	0	0
1984	North Queensland Marlins	0	0	0	0	0
1985–93	Norths Devils	0	0	0	0	0
1993	London Crusaders	0	0	0	0	0
	Total	0	0	0	0	0

Darryl Duncan is a former professional rugby league footballer.

Duncan was a character of the Brisbane Rugby League (BRL) and was signed by Brisbane club Valleys in 1980 after playing much of his junior football in Mount Isa. He made his first grade debut for the Valleys Diehards against the Redcliffe Dolphins at Lang Park in 1980 as a teenager, but it wasn't until 1982 where he became a regular in the Diehards' first-grade line-up. That season, he was seen by Valleys coach Ross Strudwick as a better option at five-eighth than eventual rugby league immortal, Wally Lewis, who was forced to play much of the 1982 BRL season in his original position of lock-forward. Duncan's ability to bust the defence with his bulky frame and his undeniable ball skills were noticed by Sydney talent scouts and he was subsequently signed by the Illawarra Steelers for the NSWRFL's 1983 Winfield Cup season.

Duncan made three appearances in first grade for the Steelers that year but eventually left mid-season, returning to Valleys where he played first and reserve grade. Duncan moved back to Mount Isa in 1984, representing the North Queensland Marlins in the Winfield State League of that season. He was instrumental in helping the Marlins become the first country side to make the finals of that particular competition. They lost to glamour Brisbane club Wynnum-Manly in the semi-final at Lang Park (22-0).

Duncan headed back to the BRL for the 1985 season where he signed with the Norths Devils. He captained the Devils that season, alternating between five-eighth and second-row. He captained the Devils on and off for the rest of his BRL career which ended in 1993 after nine-straight seasons with Norths.

He also played for a short time at London Crusaders in England.

== Career highlights ==
Duncan's highlights during his time with Norths included captaining the Devils in the famous 1990 Grand Final loss to Valleys and winning the Rothmans Medal Award in 1991 for the competition's best and fairest player. He became the second 'Darryl' from Norths to win the medal, following in the footsteps of look alike Darryl Brohman. He also made the 4BC BRL Team of the 80's. Duncan once kicked a 50 metres (160 ft) field goal after the siren to give the underdog Devils a shock 23–22 win over the then reigning BRL premiers Wynnum-Manly in a match at Bishop Park in 1985.

He returned to Mount Isa as a player-coach for local team Wanderers and in 2009 guided the club to a memorable 28–26 upset victory over Town in the A Grade grand final.
