= Jason Stevens =

Australia international rugby league footballer, screenwriter & actor

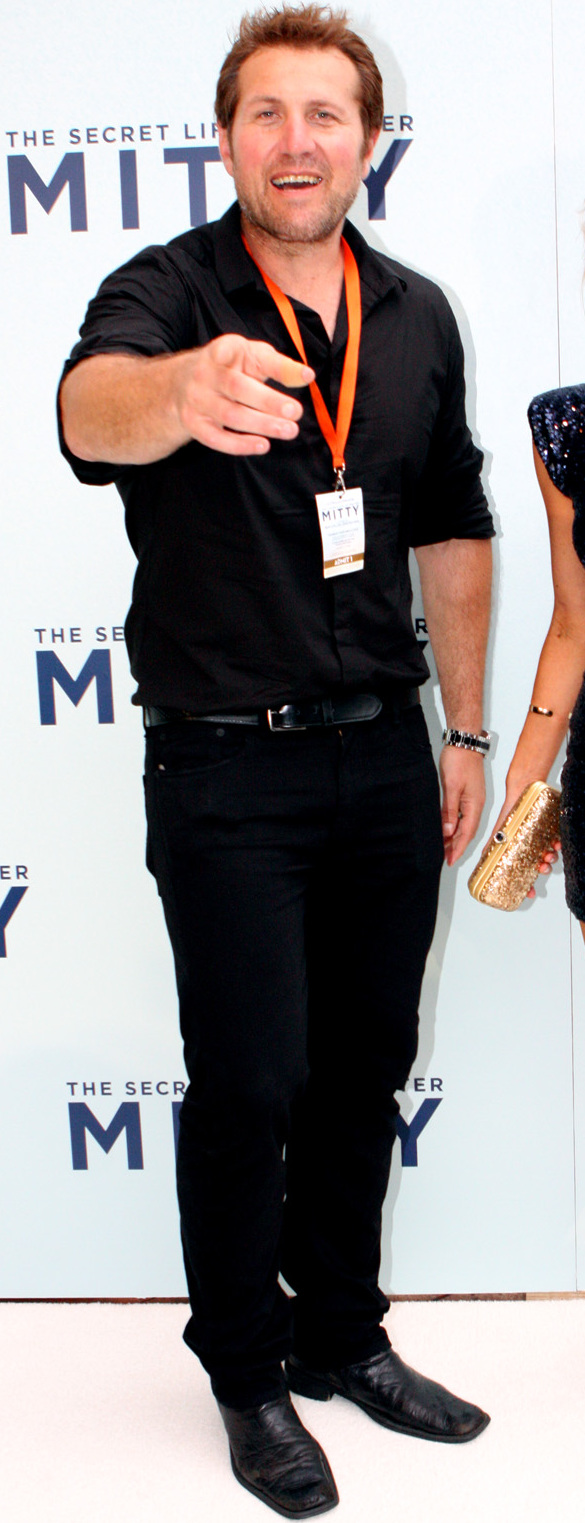

Personal information
- Full name: Jason Anthony Stevens
- Born: 8 January 1973 (age 53) Sydney, New South Wales, Australia
- Height: 193 cm (6 ft 4 in)
- Weight: 111 kg (17 st 7 lb)

Playing information
- Position: Prop
Club
Years	Team	Pld	T	G	FG	P
1992–96	St George Dragons	64	3	0	0	12
1997–05	Cronulla Sharks	167	10	0	0	40
	Total	231	13	0	0	52
Representative
Years	Team	Pld	T	G	FG	P
1998–01	Australia	18	0	0	0	0
1999–04	New South Wales	8	0	0	0	0
2003–05	City NSW	3	0	0	0	0
1997	Australia(SL)	4	0	0	0	0
- Relatives: Paul Stevens (brother)

Jason Anthony Stevens (born 8 January 1973) is an Australian former professional rugby league footballer who played in the 1990s and 2000s. He is also a writer, screenwriter and actor. An Australia national and New South Wales State of Origin representative prop, he played his club football in Sydney for the St. George Dragons and Cronulla-Sutherland Sharks. Stevens retired from competitive rugby league in 2005 and has since worked as a rugby league writer.

== Background ==
Stevens was born in Sydney, New South Wales, Australia. He is of Greek heritage from his father's side. Stevens began playing rugby league for his school, Marist College Kogarah, in the St. George area as well as playing for local club side the Brighton Seagulls after a request by a friend to join. The then captain of the St. George Dragons, Michael Beattie, recommended that he be signed for the Dragons on the scholarship programme in his mid-teens and he went on to represent the Dragons in the Matthews Cup while still in school in 1991. He is the brother of fellow former St. George Dragons player Paul Stevens.

== Playing career ==
=== St. George Dragons ===
In 1992, after being signed by the St. George Dragons, Stevens moved into the Dragons Under 21s side and reached his first Grand Final for the Dragons (Under 21s) but ended up on the losing side going down to the Western Suburbs Magpies. That year (while still in his teens) he made his first grade debut for the St. George Dragons against the Penrith Panthers at Jubilee Oval on 5 July 1992.

During the 1993 NSWRL season, Stevens became a first team regular for the Dragons, playing the majority of the season in first grade and making it to his first first grade Grand Final against Brisbane at only twenty years of age. The day turned sour though when, in the second tackle of the game, Stevens injured his thumb badly and had to be taken from the field to hospital for surgery; the Dragons eventually lost the game without him taking any further part (it was later reported that in the wake of the Dragons 14–6 loss to the Broncos that the only teammate to visit Stevens in hospital was Phil Blake).

Stevens enjoyed another four seasons for the Dragons before finally moving on to St. George's local rivals, the Cronulla-Sutherland Sharks, for the 1997 season.

=== Cronulla-Sutherland Sharks ===
Stevens enjoyed a successful and much heralded career for the Sharks. He scored a total of ten tries for the club and put in countless hours in the forward pack building his reputation as one of the best and toughest forwards in rugby league during the span of his career. At the end of the 1997 Super League season Stevens played in his second Grand Final, again a loss to the Brisbane Broncos. Post-season he was selected for Australia and made his International début against Great Britain at Wembley Stadium. The three-match Super League Test series was won by Australia 2–1 with Stevens playing at prop forward in all three test matches. It was on this tour that Stevens helped persuade his front-row partner Brad Thorn to convert to Christianity. Stevens was selected for the Australian team to compete in the end of season 1999 Rugby League Tri-Nations tournament. In the final against New Zealand he played at prop forward in the Kangaroos' 22–20 victory.

At the end of the 2001 NRL season, he went on the 2001 Kangaroo tour. Stevens also built up good partnerships over several years at the Sharks and also at International level with fellow Prop forwards Martin Lang and Chris Beattie. During the 2004 season, Stevens retired from representative rugby league after only playing around ten minutes for game 1 of the State of Origin series, though he continued to play for the Cronulla-Sutherland Sharks. In total he played 22 games for the 2004 season scoring a single try. Once the 2005 season began many speculated that it would be Stevens' last and it took several months until any official announcement was made concerning the matter. Towards the end of the 2005 season Stevens finally announced that he would retire from Rugby League while appearing on The Footy Show. The Cronulla-Sutherland Sharks as well as several other clubs offered him new contracts which he declined stating he believed it was time to hang up his boots and move on to other things; niggling injuries are also said to have pushed him towards retirement. In his final season Stevens only made 16 appearances for his club in which he scored one try.

=== Representative career ===
- City: Represented City on several occasions between 2002 and 2004
- State of Origin: Played 8 games in total for New South Wales
- Australia: Played 16 games in total for his country including representing Australia in the 2000 Rugby League World Cup

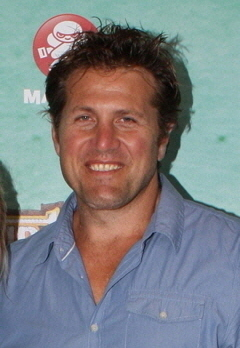
Stevens in 2013

== Entertainment career ==
Stevens was semi-regular member of the Footy Show. He has appeared in various skits, segments, and performed songs in several episodes.

Stevens was also a finalist in the 2005 Cleo Bachelor of the Year awards (finished 3rd).

In 2010, Stevens appeared regularly on Seven Network's The Matty Johns Show as a panelist and an interviewer of touring celebrities. He was also in the line up of season 10 of Dancing with the Stars. Stevens was eliminated in episode two of the series.

On stage in 2013, Stevens appeared in a Sydney production of the musical The Wiz as the Lion.

== Author ==
To date Jason Stevens has authored one book titled "Worth the Wait True love and why the sex is better". It encourages people of all ages (focused mainly on teens and young adults) to save sex for marriage instead of engaging in premarital sex. It attempts to weigh up all opinions on sex before and after marriage from both a Christian and non-Christian perspective also discussing a variety of reasons as to why he believes it should be saved.

== Religion ==
Stevens is a born-again Christian. He does many speaking engagements and social appearances for various organisations and churches around Australia every year.
