= David Cruickshank =

Australian rugby league footballer

Personal information
- Full name: David Cruickshank
- Born: 4 July 1965 (age 61) Australia

Playing information
- Position: Fullback, Halfback
Club
Years	Team	Pld	T	G	FG	P
1985	Eastern Suburbs	1	0	0	0	0
1986–89	South Sydney	45	6	0	0	24
1990	Leeds	8	3	0	0	12
1990–91	Fulham RLFC	14	3	0	0	12
1991	Salford	0	0	0	0	0
	Total	68	12	0	0	48

David Cruickshank is an Australian former rugby league footballer who played in the 1980s. He played for South Sydney and Eastern Suburbs in the New South Wales Rugby League (NSWRL) competition, plus for Fulham RLFC and Salford in England in 1990-91.

== Playing career ==
Cruickshank made his first grade debut for Eastern Suburbs in round 18 1985 against Manly-Warringah at Brookvale Oval which ended in a 22–0 loss.

In 1986, Cruickshank signed for arch rivals South Sydney and made his debut against his former club in round 6 1986. South Sydney would end up finishing the season in second place just one point behind minor premiers Parramatta. Cruickshank played in the club's qualifying final loss against Canterbury-Bankstown. Souths were eliminated the following week after losing to rivals Balmain.

In 1987, Souths finished in 5th position on the table and qualified for the finals. Cruickshank played in the club's minor preliminary finals victory over Balmain. The following week, Cruickshank played in the club's humiliating 46–12 loss against the Canberra Raiders. The match was best remembered for Souths player Steve Mavin and his numerous errors which lead to him being substituted at half time.

In 1989, Cruickshank made 10 appearances for Souths as the club won the minor premiership. He did not play in the finals series and departed the club at the end of the year. Cruickshank made a total of 88 appearances for Souths across all grades.

In January 1990, Cruickshank moved to England, and was signed by Leeds as a replacement for his former Souths teammate, Craig Coleman. He also went on to play for Fulham RLFC and Salford.
