= Jamie Smith (rugby league) =

Australian rugby league footballer

Personal information
- Full name: Jamie Smith
- Born: 10 October 1976 (age 49) Cumbria, England

Playing information
- Position: Fullback, Wing
Club
Years	Team	Pld	T	G	FG	P
1994–96	Barrow	25	8	0	0	32
1996–97	Workington Town	27	3	4	0	20
1997	Parramatta Eels	4	0	0	0	0
1998–99	Hull Sharks	33	6	12	0	48
2000	Barrow	1	0	0	0	0
2001–02	Workington Town	11	4	5	1	27
2003–04	Barrow	17	12	0	0	48
2008–09	Leigh Centurions	7	7	0	0	28
	Total	125	40	21	1	203
- Source: As of 20 May 2024

Jamie Smith is a former professional rugby league footballer who played in the 1990s and 2000s. He played for Barrow, Hull FC, Workington Town and Leigh in England. Smith also played for Parramatta in the ARL competition.

== Playing career ==
Smith began his rugby league career at Barrow where he played two seasons. In 1996, Smith played eight games for Workington Town in the Super League. Workington were relegated from the Super League at season's end having only won two games. In 1997, Smith joined the Australian side Parramatta where he played four games which were all from the interchange bench.

Smith later returned to England and played with Hull F.C. in the Super League for two seasons when they were briefly known as "Hull Sharks". In 2000, he returned to his first club Barrow before finishing his career with Leigh.
