= Down to the Moon =

Studio album by Andreas Vollenweider
- Released: March 10, 1986
- Recorded: Spring 1986, Sinus Studios (Bern)
- Genre: New age
- Length: 36:17
- Label: Epic, Kin-Kou Records
- Producer: Andreas Vollenweider

Andreas Vollenweider chronology
White Winds (1984)	Down to the Moon (1986)	Dancing with the Lion (1989)

Professional ratings
Review scores
Source	Rating
Allmusic	4.5/5 stars

Down to the Moon is Andreas Vollenweider's fifth studio album, released in 1986. It was re-released in 2005 and again in 2006. It was the first album to win the Grammy Award for Best New Age Album in 1987.

== Track listing ==
- All songs written and arranged by Andreas Vollenweider.
1. "Down To The Moon" - 2:26
2. "Moon Dance" - 4:11
3. "Steam Forest" - 4:56
4. "Water Moon" - 2:15
5. "Night Fire Dance" - 4:57
6. "Quiet Observer" - 2:43
7. "Silver Wheel" - 3:57
8. "Drown in Pale Light" - 2:13
9. "The Secret, The Candle and Love" - 3:44
10. "Hush - Patience at Bamboo Forest" - 0:12
11. "Three Silver Ladies Dance" - 2:40
12. "La Lune et L'enfant" - 2:00

== Charts ==
Chart (1987)	Peak position
Australia (Kent Music Report)	67
Canada (RPM) (24 weeks total)	53

== Personnel ==
- Andreas Vollenweider: Harp
- Christoph Stiefel: Keyboards, Synthesizers
- Pedro Haldemann: Bells
- Walter Keiser: Drums
- Jon Otis: Percussion
- Max Laesser: Strings (Arranged the Silver Symphony Orchestra and Choir)
- Matthias Ziegler: Woodwinds

== Certifications ==
Region	Certification	Certified units/sales
Switzerland (IFPI Switzerland)	Gold	25,000^{^}
^{^} Shipments figures based on certification alone.
