= Mark Keenan =

Scotland international rugby league footballer

Personal information
- Full name: Mark Keenan
- Born: 11 November 1975 (age 49)

Playing information
- Position: Wing, Scrum-half
Club
Years	Team	Pld	T	G	FG	P
≤1996–≥96	Workington Town
≤2000–≥00	Whitehaven
	Total	0	0	0	0	0
Representative
Years	Team	Pld	T	G	FG	P
1996	Scotland	1

Mark Keenan (born 11 November 1975) is a former professional rugby league footballer who played in the 1990s and 2000s. He played at representative level for Scotland, and at club level for Workington Town and Whitehaven, as a wing, or scrum-half.

== International honours ==
Mark Keenan won a cap for Scotland while at Workington Town in 1996.
