= Luke Massey (rugby league) =

Australian rugby league footballer

Personal information
- Born: 7 July 1970 (age 54); Australia

Playing information
- Position: Hooker, Prop
Club
Years	Team	Pld	T	G	FG	P
1989–92	Cronulla-Sutherland	53	1	0	0	4
1994–95	London Broncos	0	0	0	0	0
	Total	53	1	0	0	4

Luke Massey (born 7 July 1970) is an Australian former professional rugby league footballer who played for Cronulla-Sutherland. He is the son of rugby league administrator and coach Ron Massey.

A forward, Massey played his junior football with De La Salle and debuted for Cronulla in the 1989 NSWRL season. He was a member of Cronulla's first-grade team for four seasons, playing as either a hooker or prop.
