= White Winds =

White Winds (Seeker's Journey)

Studio album by Andreas Vollenweider
- Released: September 17, 1984
- Recorded: 1984, at Sinus Studio
- Genre: New age
- Length: 36:43
- Label: CBS Records, Later Re-released under Sony
- Producer: Andreas Vollenweider

Andreas Vollenweider chronology
Caverna Magica (1983)	White Winds (Seeker's Journey) (1984)	Down to the Moon (1986)

White Winds is Andreas Vollenweider's fourth studio album, released in 1984.

On his official website, Vollenweider says: "The making of 'White Winds' was like a creative harvest time. Reactions from the 'outside world' had made us more confident and more courageous, but also a bit looser. Even the song title of 'Flight Feet & Root Hands' mirrors our frame of mind: freely 'flying' feet - and our hands firmly rooted in the earth."

== Reception ==
Professional ratings
Review scores
Source	Rating
AllMusic	3/5 stars

Musician reviewer J. D. Considine wrote: "Don't call this 'mood music' unless you consider sleep a mood."

John Schaefer at Spin wrote, "Vollenweider has all the tools to make great music; the melodies prove that. But, he has settled for making mood music instead. It may be great while you're reading tea leaves, but it doesn’t withstand close listening. Most of White Winds is like bathing in club soda."

== Track listing ==
1. "The White Winds/The White Boat (First View)" - 1:49
2. "Hall of the Stairs/Hall of the Mosaics (Meeting You)" (feat. Elena Ledda) - 5:06
3. "The Glass Hall (Choose the Crystal)/The Play of the Five Balls/The Five Planets/Canopy Choir" - 7:38
4. "The Woman and the Stone" - 4:25
5. "The Stone (Close-up)" - 3:01
6. "Phases of the Three Moons" - 2:46
7. "Flight Feet & Root Hands" - 3:39
8. "Brothership" - 3:22
9. "Sisterseed" - 1:33
10. "Trilogy (At the White Magic Gardens)/The White Winds" - 3:24

== Charts ==
Chart (1985)	Peak position
Australia (Kent Music Report)	96
