= Andreas Vollenweider =

Swiss harpist (born 1953)

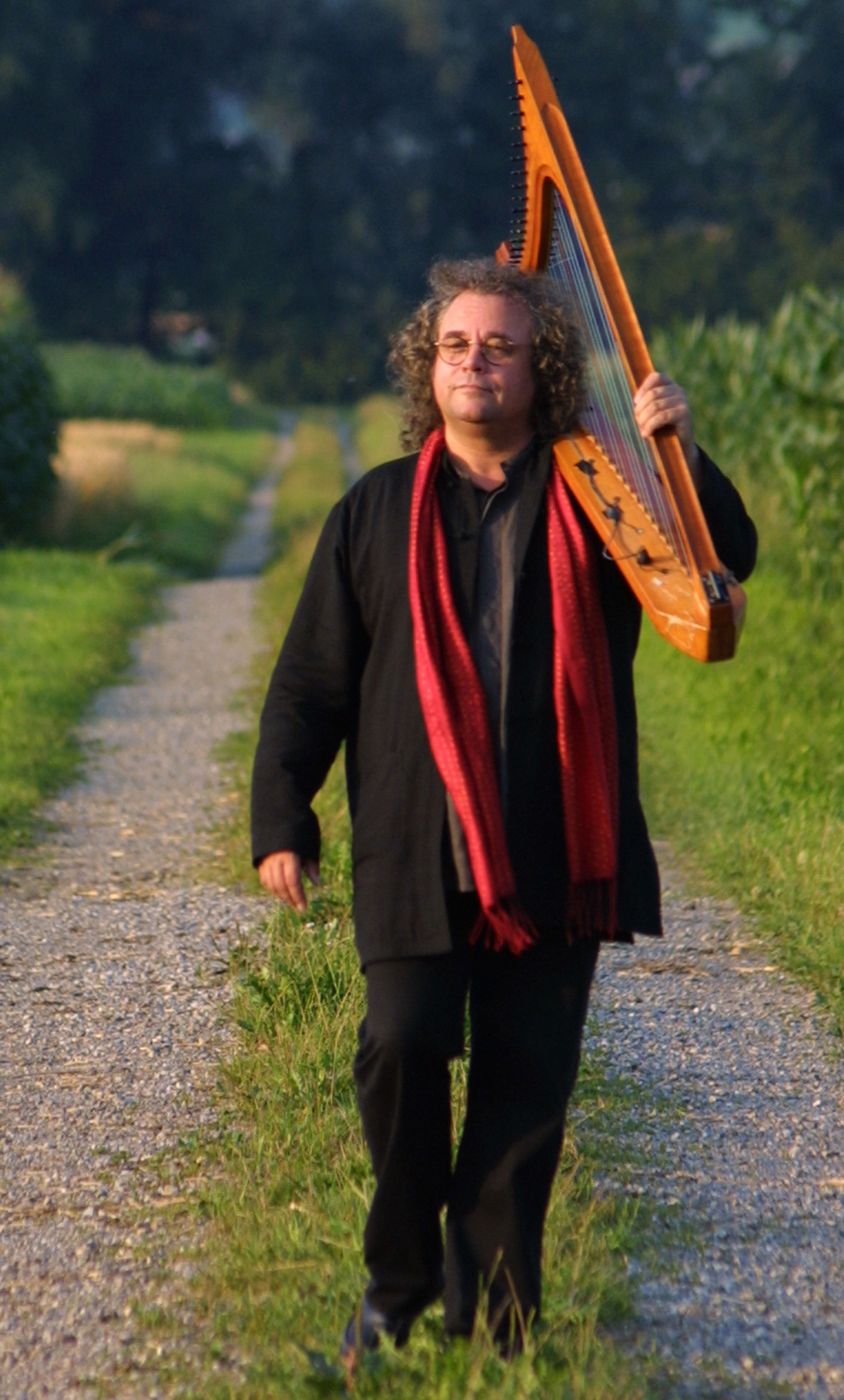
- Vollenweider in 2004

Background information
- Born: 4 October 1953 (age 72); Thalwil, Switzerland
- Genres: World, new age, Indian, classical
- Occupation: Musician
- Instrument: Harp
- Years active: 1975–present
- Labels: Columbia, Sony
- Website: vollenweider.com

Andreas Vollenweider (born 4 October 1953) is a Swiss harpist. He is generally categorised as a new-age musician and uses a modified electroacoustic harp of his own design. He has worked with Bobby McFerrin, Carly Simon, Luciano Pavarotti and in 1987 received a Grammy Award for the album Down to the Moon. Vollenweider's style has been described by The New York Times as "swirling atmospheric music, which evokes nature, magic and fairy tales".

== Early life ==
Vollenweider was born on 4 October 1953 in Zürich, Switzerland, and is the son of Hans Vollenweider (1918–1993), an organist and composer, while his mother was a painter. In 1971, he married Beata, a kindergarten teacher, with whom he has two sons (Jonathan and Sebastian) and a daughter, Noëmi. In 1975, Vollenweider discovered the harp and, finding its traditional versions too limited for his own musical ideas, developed his own style, tailoring the instrument according to his needs. He created the electro-acoustic harp. He formed the trio Poesie und Musik together with Rene Bardet (bass) and Orlando Valentini (guitar), recording interpretations of the poetry of François Villon and Heinrich Heine, but left in 1978. During this period, Vollenweider also wrote music for film, mainly nature documentaries.

== Career ==
=== 1980s ===
In 1979, he released his solo debut, Eine Art Suite in XIII Teilen in Switzerland. He subsequently began forming his ensemble "Andreas Vollenweider and Friends", which included Walter Keiser (drums), Pedro Haldemann (percussion), Bobby Reveron (percussion), and Jon Otis (percussion). This five-piece debuted on July 11, 1981, at the Montreux Jazz Festival. Vollenweider was discovered by the German record-producer and manager Vera Brandes, who oversaw the release of Behind the Gardens - Behind the Wall - Under the Tree.... through her VeraBra Records. The album was distributed through CBS Records International and reached 32 in the German album charts in March 1982. The follow-up Caverna Magica was recorded in the period May–November 1982 while Vollenweider and his band performed around Europe. Released in January 1983, the album managed to reach 11 in the German album chart. In 1983, he underlined his commitment to environmental issues with the EP "Pace Verde" in support for Greenpeace, which was accompanied by a video that Vollenweider directed and produced himself. In October of that year he was awarded a Dutch Edison Award in the Instrumental category for Caverna Magica.

In 1984, the album White Winds entered the American billboard chart. Released through CBS Masterworks in North America, his records remained on catalogue, clocking up to six-figure sales. Vollenweider embarked on his first American tour in November of that year, making his debut at the Beacon Theatre, New York. It was presented by Carly Simon who had come across his music a year earlier. She explained that "I knew I had discovered something that was going to change me in a wonderful way, I became so obsessed with his music that anyone who came to my house was introduced to it within the first 10 or 15 minutes". Through CBS she got in contact with the artist and arranged for his American debut. As his instrumental tracks were generally deemed unsuitable for radio, he largely relied on word-of-mouth in gathering an international following.

Vollenweider spent much of 1985 on tour, promoting the White Winds album with his five-piece band. The shows were described as a new age experience that combined the use of lights and dry ice while Vollenweider appeared as a "white-clad figure who's poised to drive the audience wild with a harp". In 1987, Down To The Moon, which had been originally recorded and released in 1984, received a Grammy Award. This was followed by tours in Canada, the United States, thirteen European countries, Japan, and Australia. When he composed the music of, and recorded, the dynamic album Dancing With The Lion in 1988 and 1989, Vollenweider opened his project, for the first time in his career, to numerous guests from a wide range of musical genres. He directed and produced two award-winning videos, one of which was for the title selection; for both videos, he contributed to the storyline, the choreography, and set/costume designs.

=== 1990s ===
Vollenweider's double album The Trilogy (1990), consisted of a selection of the first three albums (Behind The Gardens, Caverna Magica, and White Winds) and previously unreleased material. In 1991, he followed up with Book of Roses, which included symphonic orchestral elements for the first time. In 1992, he participated in a benefit show for Chernobyl's children on Moscow's Red Square. The same year, he won the World Music Award in Monaco for Best-Selling Swiss Artist. In 1993-94, he produced his first album including vocals. The 1993–94 album Eolian Minstrel featured contributions from American singers Carly Simon and Eliza Gilkyson. The release was followed by worldwide tours.

In 1994, he performed at the Pavarotti and Friends event in Modena, Italy, where he played duets with operatic lyric tenor Luciano Pavarotti (a native of Modena) and Canadian rock balladeer Bryan Adams. After conducting tours and open-air shows in Europe and the United States, in 1995 he played in Latin America for the first time. 1995–97 saw Vollenweider playing a series of shows in remarkable locations: a tour of Polish castles, a show with Italian singer/songwriter Zucchero at the 2500 m high location (at −8 °C) of Brunico in the Southern Alps, and in a giant volcanic cave at Lanzarote's Festival Musica Visual.

In 1998, Vollenweider began the recording of Kryptos, a work for symphonic orchestras and guest virtuosos from all over the world. He initiated a symphonic live project which he called Wolkenstein. In 1999, he returned to free improvisation and intimate musical dialogues with his album COSMOPOLY He invited friends, including American vocal acrobat Bobby McFerrin, Brazilian cult poet and singer Milton Nascimento, South-African ethno-jazz pianist Abdullah Ibrahim, the 74-year-old Armenian duduk legend Djivan Gasparyan, Galician bag-pipe and whistle virtuoso Carlos Núñez Muñoz, the American singer-songwriter Carly Simon, and American blues-trombone master Ray Anderson, from all over the globe to create "world music".

=== 2000s ===
Throughout 2000, he traveled with the COSMOPOLY project in Europe. Its changing configuration of musicians — almost daily — enabled Vollenweider to follow the open concept of the album. In New York City, he and his friends played two concerts for the United States release. Carly Simon joined the group, as did Mindy Jostyn, Carlos Núñez, Djivan Gasparyan, XiaoJing Wang and Walter Keiser. Concerts in Brazil — with Milton Nascimento and composer/pianist Wagner Tiso — followed. In 2001, Vollenweider performed in Bali (Indonesia) at the international conference "song of convergence" with Balinese musicians. He began writing the "symphonic novel" Tales of Kira Kutan, which premiered at the Warsaw Film Music Festival 2001, with the orchestra Sinfonia Varsowia (Yehudi Menuhin), conducted by co-orchestrator André Bellmont. Returning to his native Switzerland, Vollenweider premiered Carte blanche at the AVO Festival in Basel, where his guests, in addition to a mini orchestra, included Abdullah Ibrahim and David Lindley.

In 2002, he performed at the Budapest Spring Festival in Hungary. Performances of the symphonies Tales of Kira Kutan and Wolkenstein at the Festival "Live at Sunset" in Zürich, with Sinfonia Varsovia, followed, as did a European summer tour, with the newly formed AVAF-mini orchestra, that included a performance at the "Big Chill Festival" in England and continued that fall. It was around this time that he collaborated with German film composer Hans Zimmer, in Los Angeles, on the music score for the movie Tears of the Sun (starring Bruce Willis and Monica Bellucci). In 2003, he continued his work with Zimmer. A performance followed, with his mini orchestra, in Johannesburg and at the "North Sea Festival" in Cape Town.

In 2004 and 2005, AVAF continued to increase touring activities in Europe. At this time, Vollenweider's entire catalogue was re-mastered and re-released on new record labels worldwide (USA/Canada: www.kinkoumusic.com; international: www.edel.com). A compilation, The Best of "Magic Harp, was released in the United States and Canada, and The Storyteller was released in Europe. A four-hour DVD was also produced. He played for the Dalai Lama, when the latter paid a visit in Zürich. In 2005, he released the album VOX.

In the first three months of 2006, following extensive touring in Europe, Vollenweider conducted his first tour of the US in over ten years, touring from coast to coast. At that time, he also released his first DVD, The Magical Journeys of Andreas Vollenweider, which contained almost four hours of live concerts, documentaries, interviews. During the summer of that year, he recorded a new album, titled Midnight Clear, in which he again collaborated with Carly Simon. (See above for his previous collaborations with her.) The last three months of 2006 saw Vollenweider touring in Europe, in addition to his release of Midnight Clear on a worldwide basis and that of the DVD The Magical Journeys of Andreas Vollenweider in the rest of the world. 2007 saw Vollenweider draw his third nomination for a Grammy Award for the soundtrack album of the current DVD release The Magical Journeys of Andreas Vollenweider. Concerts in Europe and the United States followed, as did, in September of that year, the release of the two-CD double album Andreas Vollenweider & Friends - 25 Years Live, which covered the period from 1982 to 2007.

In 2008, during his composition of the music for, and his recording of, the album A I R, Vollenweider was a guest performer at the celebration concert for the 80th birthday of Armenian duduk legend Jivan Gasparyan.

=== 2010s ===
In 2010, Vollenweider gave concerts in Eastern and Western Europe. In June, he undertook a special concert project, which he titled The Watercourse Way, at the Shanghai Centre in Shanghai, China, as part of Expo 2010. A "Dream Concert" of the extended AVAF followed in August, as did the "Dancing With The Lion Orchestra" concert on the shore of Lake Zurich; it featured a gathering of Vollenweider's musical friends from all corners of the world. In 2011, three decades after his first concert, he accepted the invitation of Montreux Jazz Festival founder Claude Nobs to perform an exclusive jubilee concert, on 7 July, at the 45th such Festival, titled "30 Years Andreas Vollenweider & Friends". It featured special guests Richard Bona and Raul Midon.

In 2012, he played at the farewell concert for Claude Nobs, who had died in January of that year. In the same year Vollenweider was granted the Swiss Music Award for "Outstanding Achievement Award" for his continuing life's work. On Christmas Eve, Swiss Television broadcasts the first major documentary devoted to Vollenweider, in which filmmaker Cristina Karrer shows impressing and touching sequences recorded in October 2010 in South Africa. In May 2012 Andreas Vollenweider lends his name to a campaign by ROKPA, a charity he has been working with for decades. Children who had once lived on the streets in Kathmandu, Nepal, visit eight Swiss cities to tell their moving stories using theatre, dance and music, with a changing roster of Swiss musical guests and an equally celebrated line-up of TV moderators.

For a scientific study conducted between 2013 and 2016 by researchers at the University of Geneva (UNIGE) and the University Hospitals of Geneva (HUG) in Switzerland, Vollenweider wrote music that was specifically designed to improve the neural development of premature babies. The composer wrote three sound environments of eight minutes each, with punji, harp and bells pieces. The neural networks of premature babies who heard Vollenweider's music were significantly improved, becoming more similar to those of full-term newborns, "providing evidence for a beneficial effect of music on the preterm brain".

== Style ==
His style has been described as weaving "elements of European classical and folk music, Third World vocal and percussive effects and natural sound effects into cyclical suites". Vollenweider is perceived as one of the pioneers of the New Age genre, although his earlier recordings appeared on the Billboard jazz chart. The composer found that "what I am doing is really a very old thing, a very 'old age' thing, because I'm doing what people have been doing for thousands of years".

== Activism ==
In the 1980s, Vollenweider was described as someone whose "politics run to the left, including support for Amnesty International and Greenpeace". He is an outspoken pacifist and follower of the principles of non-violent conflict management of Mahatma Gandhi.

== Discography ==
- Eine Art Suite In XIII Teilen (Tages-Anzeiger 1979)
- Behind the Gardens (CBS, 1981)
- Caverna Magica (Columbia, 1982)
- White Winds (Columbia, 1984) – AUS No. 96
- Down to the Moon (CBS, 1986) – AUS No. 67
- Dancing with the Lion (Columbia, 1989)
- Traumgarten (Columbia, 1990)
- Book of Roses (Columbia, 1991)
- Eolian Minstrel (Columbia, 1993)
- Kryptos (Sony, 1997)
- Cosmopoly (Sony, 1999)
- Vox (Universal, 2004)
- Midnight Clear (Content, 2006)
- Air (Content, 2009)
- Quiet Places (AVAF-Music, 2020)
- Slow Flow / Dancer (AVAF-Music, 2022)

== Gallery ==
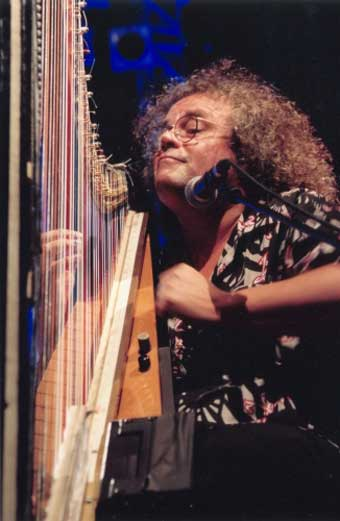

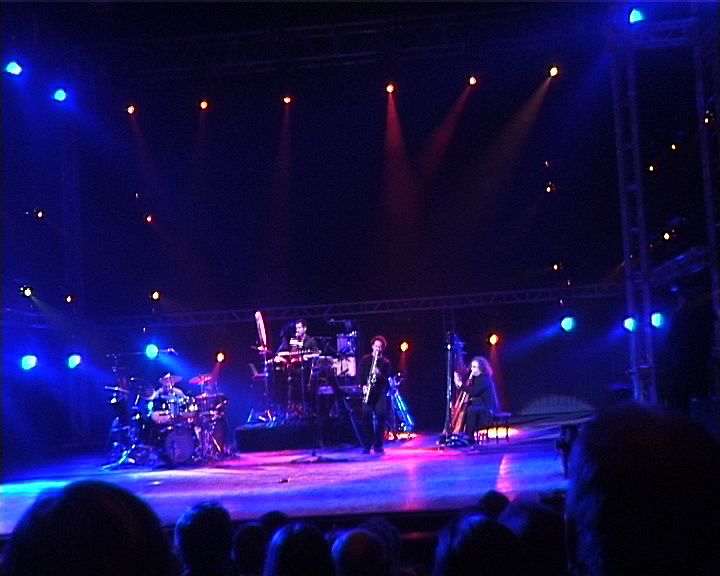

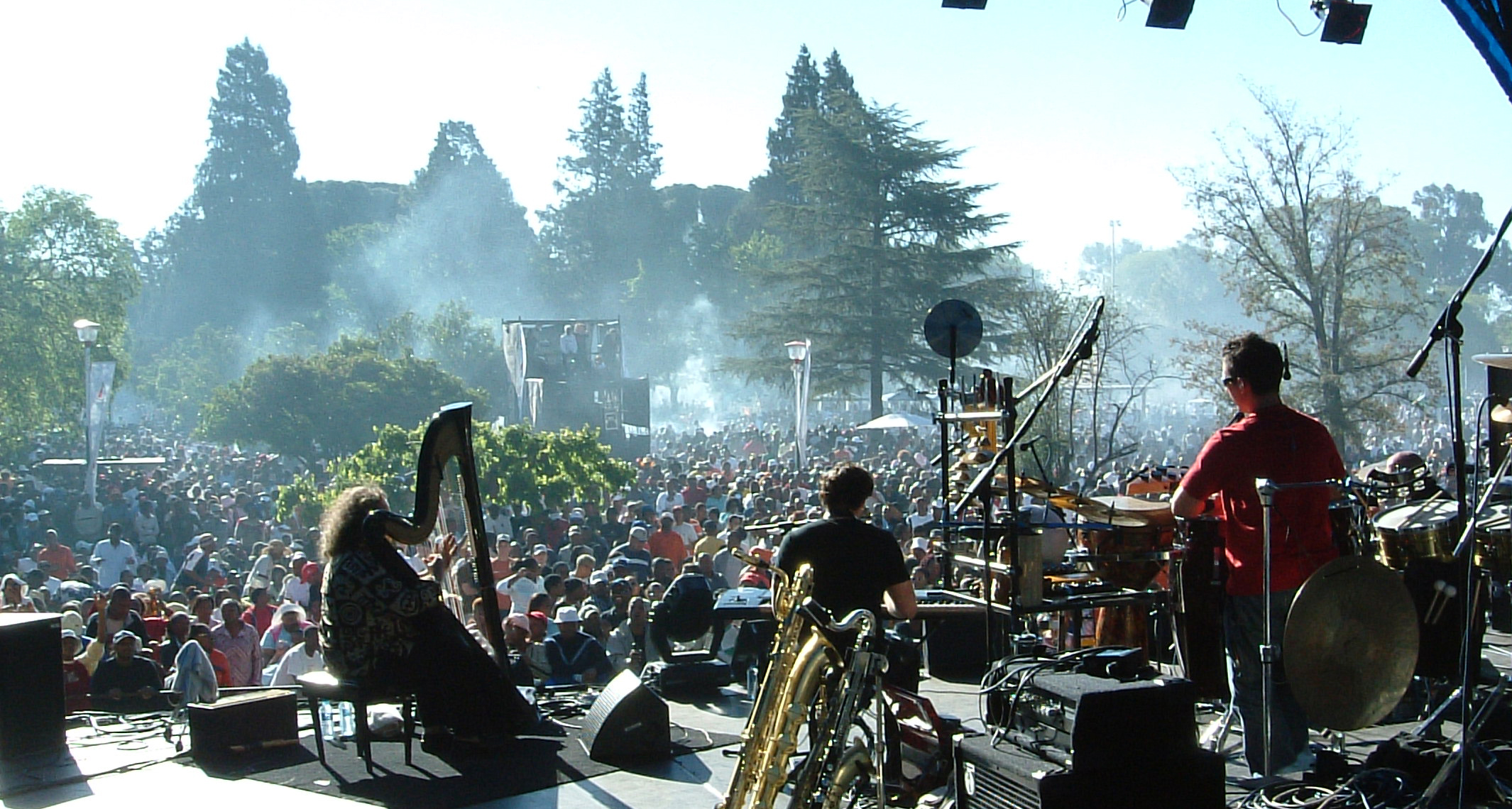

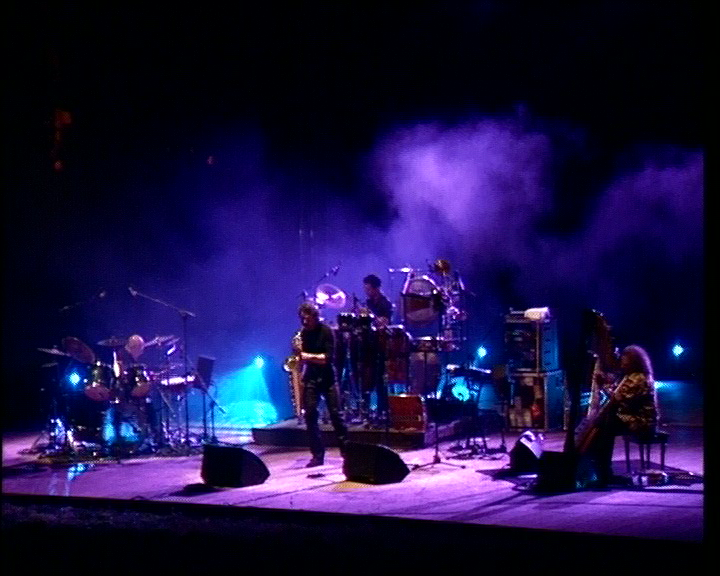

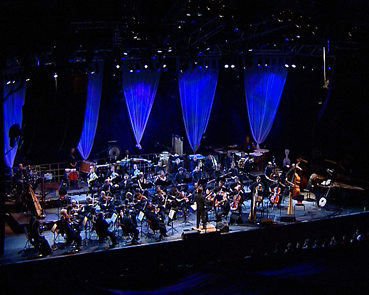
