= Michael French (disambiguation) =

Michael French is a British actor.

Michael French may also refer to:

- Michael French (firefighter), firefighter who was killed during the Charleston Sofa Super Store fire
- Mike French (born 1953), Canadian lacrosse player
- Mike French (rugby union), United States rugby union player
- Michael Bryan French, American actor
- Micky French, English footballer

== See also ==
- Michael ffrench-O'Carroll (1919–2007), Irish medical doctor
