= Michael Francis (rugby league) =

Australian rugby league footballer

Personal information
- Full name: Michael Francis
- Born: 7 February 1974 (age 51)

Playing information
- Position: Second-row, Prop
Club
Years	Team	Pld	T	G	FG	P
1993–98	South Sydney	56	3	0	0	12
1995–96	London Broncos	24	0	0	0	0
	Total	80	3	0	0	12

Michael Francis is an Australian former rugby league footballer who played in the 1990s. He played for South Sydney in the New South Wales Rugby League (NSWRL) competition and for the London Broncos in the Rugby Football League Championship First Division.

== Background ==
Francis played his junior rugby league for Lithgow and represented the Australian schoolboys team in 1992.

== Playing career ==
Francis made his first grade debut for South Sydney in round 9 of the 1993 season against Parramatta at Parramatta Stadium. During the 1995 off season, Francis played in England with the London Broncos in the last Rugby Football League Championship First Division season before the introduction of the Super League.

Francis played with Souths until the end of 1998 before departing the club. He made nearly 100 appearances for the club across all grades.
