= Darryl Pitt =

American artist manager and photographer

Darryl Pitt (born 1955) is an American artist manager, photographer and contributor to the popularization of meteorites.

== Early life and Professional career ==
=== Photography ===
In the early 80s Pitt worked at Rolling Stone and freelanced for Time, Newsweek, Forbes, Fortune and others. From 1979 to 1985, he was an official photographer of the Montreux Jazz Festival and tour photographer for Diana Ross, Crosby, Stills and Nash, Bob Seger, Harry Chapin and Neil Diamond. His images appear in dozens of albums and books. In the 90s, he photographed aesthetic meteorites as fine sculpture — a first. A decade later he began what is now a two decade long project photographing flowers in a single New York City community garden.

=== Artist management ===
Electroacoustic harpist Andreas Vollenweider asked Pitt to be his manager in 1982 when he wanted to break into the U.S. market. With Pitt in that role, Vollenweider went on to sell more than 10 million records and receive the first New Age Grammy. Pitt's second client was saxophonist Michael Brecker, whom he represented for his entire solo career during which Brecker received 15 Grammys. Pitt has produced concerts at Carnegie Hall and elsewhere and in 1993 co-produced a tour of Simon & Garfunkel. He currently represents multi-Grammy winners Dianne Reeves and Antonio Sanchez. Reeves is an NEA Jazz Master and Sanchez created the film score for Birdman. Previous clients include Art Garfunkel, Regina Carter, The Bad Plus and Kurt Elling.

In honor of Brecker, Pitt and Susan Brecker co-produce “The Nearness of You” concerts to benefit the cancer research of Drs. Azra Raza and Siddhartha Mukherjee. Paul Simon, James Taylor, Hugh Jackman, Christopher Cross and Elvis Costello have been among those featured.

=== Meteorites ===
Pitt began collecting meteorites in the late 80s. In his desire to popularize meteorites he consigned meteorites for auction in 1995 — a first — and the ensuing media coverage, of this and Pitt's subsequent offerings, created a surge of interest.^{[} Meteorite research also benefited: news of high auction prices was the catalyst for a new generation of meteorite hunters to search the world's deserts resulting in an unprecedented number of scientifically important specimens. Specimens from Pitt's "Macovich Collection of Meteorites" are in The Smithsonian, American Museum of Natural History, The Natural History Museum (London) and Academy of Sciences in Moscow and Beijing. In 1998, Art & Antiques magazine signaled meteorites’ penetration into the art market when it included a meteorite in its "100 Top Treasures of the Year” for the first time — and it had Macovich provenance.

Pitt went on to curate the first meteorite-only auctions at Bonhams, Heritage, Christie's and "Sotheby's" Among those who've acquired specimens with a Macovich provenance are Paul Allen, Steven Spielberg, Shaikh Saud bin Muhammed Al Thani, William Ziff Jr., Jerry Bruckheimer and James Taylor.

In 1997, Pitt created the first interplanetary collectible. The limited-edition “Mars Cube” — a Lucite cube containing 1/10 carat of Mars accompanied by a Mars Owner’s Manual — launched on QVC for $98. Decades later, Apple's legendary Chief Design Officer, Jony Ive, acquired dozens for Christmas gifts. Later still a Mars Cube sold at Christie's in 2021 for $6,000. Pitt also conceived of the first lunar necklace which sold at Christie's in 2023 for $201,600. As a result of the anomaly he noticed in the Willamette meteorite, among the world's most famous, Pitt was credited as a co-author in its reclassification.

Pitt is the Chair of the Meteorite Division of the Maine Mineral & Gem Museum (“MMGM”) for whom he sourced what is among the foremost meteorite collections in the world and features the largest specimens of the Moon, Mars and Vesta on Earth.

In the book The Art of Collecting Meteorites (2012), renowned meteorite hunter Robert Haag stated, “No one has done more to popularize meteorites than Darryl — except me".
