= Shaun Keating =

Australian rugby league footballer

Personal information
- Born: 8 July 1970 (age 54); Australia

Playing information
- Position: Prop, Second-row
Club
Years	Team	Pld	T	G	FG	P
1992–93	Brisbane Broncos	5	0	0	0	0
1995–96	London Broncos	0	0	0	0	0
	Total	5	0	0	0	0

Shaun Keating (born 8 July 1970) is an Australian former professional rugby league footballer who played for the Brisbane Broncos.

== Rugby league career ==
A forward, Keating played two seasons of first-grade with Brisbane. His coach Wayne Bennett described him as having good mobility and being a good defensive player.

Keating debuted in the 1992 NSWRL season as an injury replacement for Gavin Allen in Brisbane's round eight fixture against St. George and played well in a two-point win, keeping his spot in the team for the next three rounds. He played as a prop and second rower.

In the 1993 NSWRL season he made one further appearance for Brisbane, when he was picked on the bench against the Illawarra Steelers in round eight. The Broncos were premiers in both of his first-grade seasons.

From 1995 to 1996 he played for the London Broncos, which had been taken over by Brisbane.
