= Scott Carter (Australia rugby league) =

Australian rugby league footballer

Personal information
- Full name: Scott Carter

Playing information
- Position: Hooker
Club
Years	Team	Pld	T	G	FG	P
1988–91	Newcastle Knights	42	4	0	0	16
1993–94	London Crusaders	32	5	0	0	20
	Total	74	9	0	0	36
Representative
Years	Team	Pld	T	G	FG	P
1990	Country NSW Origin	1	0	0	0	0
- Source: As of 5 August 2021

Scott Carter is an Australian former rugby league footballer who played in the 1980s and 1990s.

As a player, Carter was part of the inaugural Newcastle Knights squad from 1988 to 1991. He played for Country Origin in 1990, and London Crusaders in England.
