= Evan Cochrane =

Australian rugby league footballer

Personal information
- Born: 13 December 1972 (age 52); Australia

Playing information
- Position: Wing, Centre
Club
Years	Team	Pld	T	G	FG	P
1992	Western Suburbs	2	0	0	0	0
1993	South Sydney	2	0	0	0	0
1995	Balmain Tigers	7	4	0	0	16
1995–96	London Broncos
1997–98	Newcastle Knights	21	4	0	0	16
	Total	32	8	0	0	32

Evan Cochrane (born 13 December 1972) is an Australian former professional rugby league footballer who played as a winger and centre in the 1990s.

He played for the Western Suburbs Magpies in 1992, the South Sydney Rabbitohs in 1993, the Balmain Tigers in 1995, the London Broncos in 1996 and finally the Newcastle Knights from 1997 to 1998.
