= Andre Stoop =

Namibia international rugby union & league footballer

Personal information
- Born: 8 October 1960 (age 65) Tsumeb, South-West Africa

Playing information

Rugby union
- Position: Full-back
Club
Years	Team	Pld	T	G	FG	P
1980–91	South West Africa
1996	Blackheath
	Total	0	0	0	0	0
Representative
Years	Team	Pld	T	G	FG	P
1990–91	Namibia	11	6	0	0	24

Rugby league
- Position: Fullback
Club
Years	Team	Pld	T	G	FG	P
1991–93	Wigan	16	1	3	0	10
1994	London Crusaders	15	9	0	0	36
1994–96	Keighley Cougars	48	20	0	0	80
	Total	79	30	3	0	126

Andre Stoop (born 8 October 1960) is a retired rugby union and rugby league footballer. At fullback he played domestic rugby union in South Africa and played for the Namibian national team. In 1991 he changed codes to play rugby league in the United Kingdom. Between 1991 and 1996 he played for Wigan, London Crusaders and Keighley Cougars. In 1996, he returned to rugby union and signed for Blackheath.

== Career ==
Stoop played in South African domestic competitions, the Sports Pienaar Cup and Currie Cup for Namibian side South West Africa between 1980 and 1991. In 1988 he was named Namibian Sportsman of the Year. Between March 1990 and August 1991 he was capped 11 times for the Namibian national team. In his 11 appearances Stoop scored six tries as Namibia won 10 of the 11 matches. In the one game where he was on the losing side (against Wales on 2 June 1990) he was sent off for head-butting an opponent. Stoop was also selected to play for invitational side the South African Barbarians on seven occasions.

In 1991 Stoop moved to the United Kingdom, changed codes and joined rugby league team Wigan. During a two-season stay at Wigan, Stoop made 16 appearances before joining London Crusaders. After a single season at London, Stoop joined Keighley Cougars in August 1994.

At the end of the 1996 rugby league season, Stoop returned to rugby union joining London side Blackheath.
