= Paul Stevens (rugby league) =

Australian rugby league players (born 1974)

Personal information
- Full name: Paul Anthony Stevens
- Born: 7 October 1974 (age 50); Sydney, New South Wales, Australia

Playing information
- Height: 190 cm (6 ft 3 in)
- Weight: 108 kg (17 st 0 lb)
- Position: Prop, Second-row
Club
Years	Team	Pld	T	G	FG	P
1993–95	Wigan	7	1	0	0	0
1994	St. George Dragons	11	0	0	0	0
1995–96	London Broncos	20	2	0	0	8
1996	Oldham Bears	3	0	0	0	0
1997–98	Rochdale Hornets	51	20	0	1	81
1999	Swinton Lions	6	1	0	0	4
	Total	98	24	0	1	93
- Relatives: Jason Stevens (brother)

Paul Anthony Stevens (born 7 October 1974) is an Australian former professional rugby league footballer who played in the 1990s. He played primarily as a prop for Wigan, St. George Dragons, London Broncos, Oldham Bears and the Rochdale Hornets. He is the brother of former St. George Dragons and Cronulla-Sutherland Sharks player Jason Stevens.

== Background ==
Stevens was born in Sydney, New South Wales, Australia. He is of Greek heritage from his father's side. Stevens began playing rugby league for his school, Marist College Kogarah, in the St. George area as well as playing for local club side the Brighton Seagulls after a request by a friend to join. The then captain of the St. George Dragons, Michael Beattie, recommended that he be signed for the Dragons on the scholarship program in his mid-teens and he went on to play for the Dragons in the Matthews Cup while still in school in 1991.

== Playing career ==
In 1992, after being signed by the St. George Dragons, Stevens moved into the Dragons' S.G. Ball Cup side and reached his first Grand Final for the Dragons (S.G. Ball Cup). They ended up defeating the Canterbury-Bankstown Bulldogs 20−0 in the Grand Final. The following season, he joined English side Wigan. Stevens started his career at the Wigan Warriors, before returning to Australia and joining his brother Jason Stevens at the St. George Dragons in 1994. He played 11 games in his lone season of first grade with the Dragons.

In 1995, Stevens once again returned to England, this time to play for the London Broncos. After two seasons with the Broncos, Stevens joined the Oldham Bears in 1996. He returned to Australia again in 1997, joining his brother Jason at the Super League aligned Cronulla. He did not play any first grade games at Cronulla. The Cronulla side did not offer Stevens a contract for the new unified competition of 1998 and was released from the club at season's end.

In 1998, Stevens played his final season of first grade for English side the Rochdale Hornets.

== Religion ==
Stevens is a born-again Christian. He has also worked as a pastor.
