= Leo Dynevor =

Australian rugby league footballer

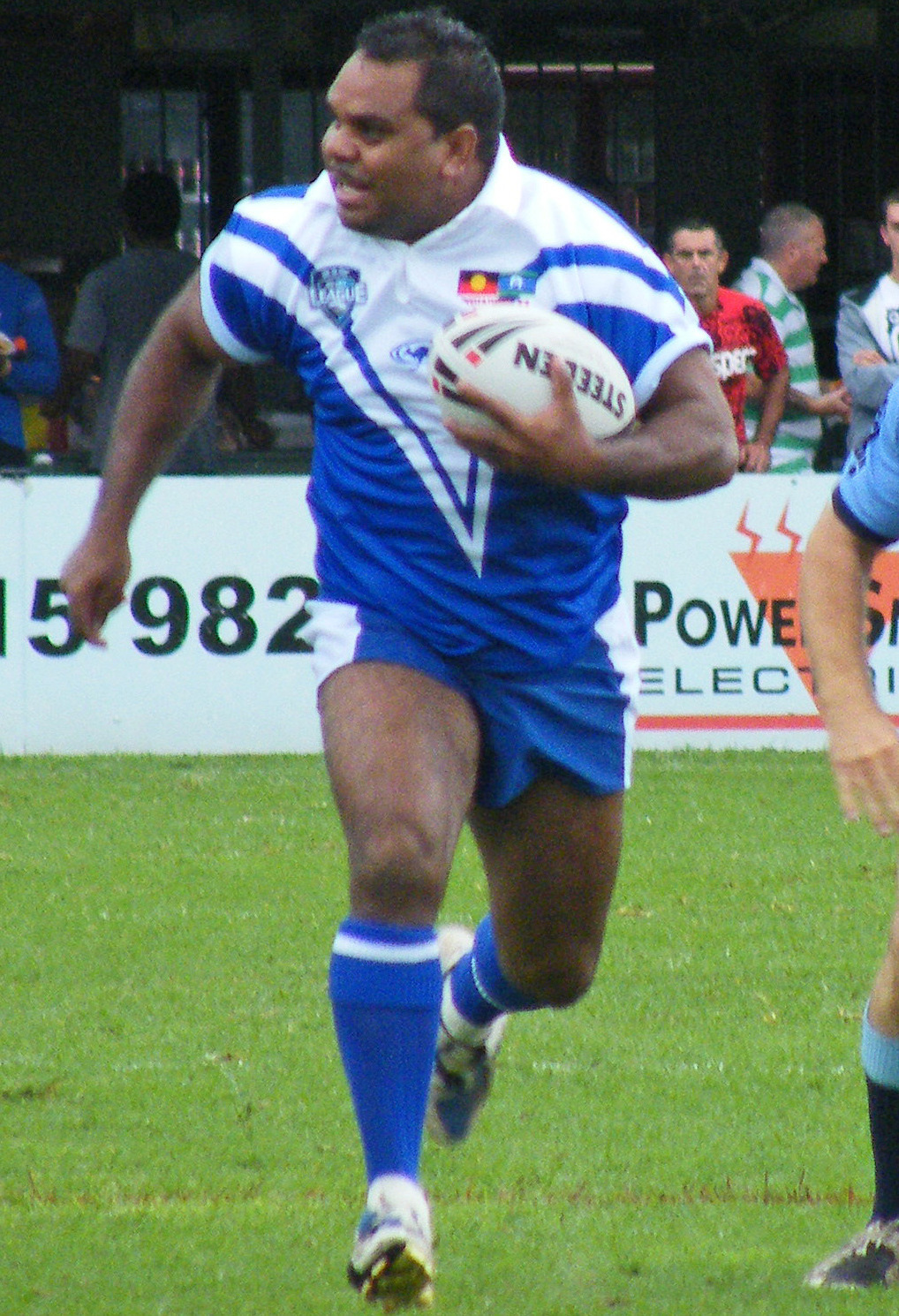

Personal information
- Full name: Leo Dynevor
- Born: 13 February 1974 (age 52) Murgon, Queensland, Australia

Playing information
- Position: Halfback, Five-eighth
Club
Years	Team	Pld	T	G	FG	P
1995–96	London Broncos	50	21	27	0	138
1997	Newcastle Knights	19	8	36	0	104
1998–99	Western Suburbs	27	3	12	1	37
	Total	96	32	75	1	279

Leo Dynevor (born 13 February 1974) is an Australian former professional rugby league footballer who played in the 1990s. He played for the London Broncos in 1996, the Newcastle Knights in 1997 and finally the Western Suburbs Magpies from 1998 to 1999.

== Playing career ==
Dynevor began his first grade career in England with the London Broncos. In 1997, Dynevor signed with Newcastle and played 19 games for them, mostly at halfback as a replacement for the injured Andrew Johns. He was the cub’s leading points-scorer that season and played in the Knights' preliminary final victory over North Sydney, however Dynevor was not included in the grand final side which defeated Manly-Warringah the following week due to Johns’s availability and coach Malcolm Reilly opting for an all-forwards bench for the decider.

In 1998, Dynevor signed with Western Suburbs. Dynevor spent two unsuccessful seasons with the Magpies, with the club finishing last in both 1998 and 1999. Dynevor's final first-grade game was a 68-10 loss to Parramatta in Round 20, 1999. At the end of 1999, Western Suburbs merged with fellow foundation club Balmain to form the Wests Tigers, but Dynevor was not one of the Western Suburbs players offered a contract to play with the new team.
