= Bernard Carroll =

Australian rugby league footballer

Personal information
- Full name: Bernard Carroll
- Born: 26 March 1970 (age 56)

Playing information
- Position: Wing, Second-row
Club
| Years | Team | Pld | T | G | FG | P |
|---|---|---|---|---|---|---|
| 1992–94 | Balmain Tigers | 22 | 0 | 0 | 0 | 0 |
| 1995–96 | London Broncos | 25 | 2 | 0 | 0 | 8 |
| | Total | 47 | 2 | 0 | 0 | 8 |
- Source: As of 6 January 2023

Bernard Carroll is an Australian former professional rugby league footballer who played in the 1990s. He played for Balmain in the NSWRL competition and for the London Broncos in the Super League.

== Playing career ==
Carroll made his first grade debut for Balmain in round 11 of the 1992 NSWRL season against Manly-Warringah at Leichhardt Oval. Carroll spent three years at Balmain and made 22 appearances. In his final year at the club, Balmain finished with the Wooden Spoon. In 1995, he signed for the London Broncos and played two seasons making 25 appearances and scoring two tries.
