= Gary Greinke =

Australian rugby league footballer & coach

Personal information
- Full name: Gary Lionel Greinke
- Born: 30 June 1960 (age 66) Australia

Playing information
Club
Years	Team	Pld	T	G	FG	P
	Brisbane Souths
1985–86	St Helens	13	1	0	0	4
	Total	13	1	0	0	4

Coaching information
Club
Years	Team	Gms	W	D	L	W%
1994–96	London Broncos	56	30	1	25	54

Gary Greinke is an Australian former professional rugby league footballer and coach. He played for Brisbane Souths in the late 1970s and early 1980s in the Brisbane Rugby League premiership and later coached the London Broncos in the 1994-95 Second division and the 1995–96 Championship.

He also coached the Ipswich Jets and Brisbane Norths in the Queensland Cup, coaching Greg Inglis alongside many others. Greinke took the Jets to their maiden Queensland Cup grand final appearance, and later became Chairman of rugby league Ipswich.

He coached at representative level with the Queensland under-18s and under-19s in the State of Origin series.

In 2012 he was accused of stealing $65,000 from Maroons State of Origin coach Mal Meninga.
