= Logan Campbell (rugby league) =

Scotland international rugby league footballer

Personal information
- Born: 23 May 1971 (age 55) New Zealand

Playing information
- Position: Centre, Second-row
Club
Years	Team	Pld	T	G	FG	P
	Northcote Tigers
1993	Newcastle Knights	1	0	0	0	0
1993–94	London Crusaders	29	21	0	0	84
1996	Workington Town	28	13	0	0	48
1997–99	Hull FC	66	12	0	0	48
2000	Castleford Tigers	20	6	0	0	24
2001	Hull FC	33	5	0	0	12
	Total	177	57	0	0	216
Representative
Years	Team	Pld	T	G	FG	P
	Auckland
1998	Scotland	2	1	0	0	4
- Source: As of 20 May 2024

Logan Campbell (born 23 May 1971) is a former Scotland international rugby league footballer who played as a professional in Australia and England. He also represented Auckland.

== Background ==
He was born in New Zealand.

== Early years ==
A Northcote Tigers junior, in 1991 Campbell won the Tetley Trophy, topping the try scoring charts in Auckland Rugby League's Fox Memorial Trophy. During this time Campbell also represented Auckland.

== Playing career ==
Campbell played for the Newcastle Knights in 1993. Even though he only played one game for the Newcastle Knights, he is famous with older fans for debuting on the bench with the then 19-year-old Andrew Johns.

In early 1994 he joined the London Crusaders. In 1996 he joined Workington Town in the new Super League competition. He joined Hull FC in 1997 for three seasons before spending 2000 with the Castleford Tigers. In 2001 he returned to Hull for another season before being released.

== Representative career ==
Campbell played two matches for Scotland in 1998. He was selected for the 2000 World Cup for Scotland but never played in a match.
