= Ross Strudwick =

Australia international rugby league footballer and coach

Personal information
- Full name: Ross Andrew Strudwick
- Born: 1950 (age 75–76) Nyngan, New South Wales, Australia

Playing information
- Position: Halfback
Club
Years	Team	Pld	T	G	FG	P
1969–72	St. George	32	1	54	4	117
1973–81	Fortitude Valley
	Total	32	1	54	4	117
Representative
Years	Team	Pld	T	G	FG	P
1973–76	Queensland	8	0	3	2	8
1975	Australia	1	0	0	0	0
1979	Brisbane	1	0	0	0	0

Coaching information
Club
Years	Team	Gms	W	D	L	W%
1979–84	Fortitude Valley	123	79	4	40	64
1985–87	Past Brothers	44	33	0	11	75
1988–89	Halifax	20	7	0	13	35
1990–93	London Crusaders	25	8	0	17	32
	Total	212	127	4	81	60

Ross Strudwick (born 1950) is an Australian former rugby league footballer and coach. An Australian international, New South Wales and Queensland representative halfback of the 1970s, he played club football in the New South Wales Rugby Football League Premiership for St. George and in the Brisbane Rugby League Premiership for Fortitude Valley. Strudwick later embarked on a coaching career in Queensland and England.

== Playing ==
Strudwick started his career in the New South Wales Rugby Football League premiership with St. George Dragons in 1969. He played there until 1972, gaining selection for New South Wales during this period. Strudwick was the understudy to the champion Dragons halfback Billy Smith during that period, thus his first grade appearances were irregular.

After moving north to play in the Brisbane Rugby League premiership with Fortitude Valley, Strudwick was selected to represent Queensland several times and also played for Australia in the 1975 World Series. He was captain of Valleys when a teenage Wally Lewis made his first grade debut for the club in 1978 and worked with the youngster to help develop his long passing skills. That year they made the Grand Final but lost to Easts. The following year, with Strudwick as captain-coach, Valleys beat Souths to win the 1979 BRL premiership.

== Coaching ==
Following his retirement from playing, Strudwick continued coaching in Queensland, taking Brothers to victory in the 1987 BRL grand final, before moving to England the following year to take up opportunities there. He coached Halifax during the 1980s but was sacked after a home defeat by Featherstone Rovers. He also worked as a television match commentator for BBC Grandstand, and coached and managed London Crusaders before being replaced by Darryl van der Velde in 1992. He resigned as general manager of the club in 1993.

Strudwick is also the founder and CEO of a sporting goods retail franchise called Struddys, and his son, Nathan has also played rugby league, signing with the Brisbane Broncos club.
