= Dave Rotheram =

English rugby league footballer

Personal information
- Born: 16 August 1968 (age 58) St Helens, England

Playing information
- Position: Hooker, Prop
Club
Years	Team	Pld	T	G	FG	P
1989–95	Fulham / London Crusaders	150	13	0	0	52

Coaching information
Club
Years	Team	Gms	W	D	L	W%
2006–07	Whitehaven
2008–09	Workington Town
	Total	0	0	0	0

Dave Rotheram (born 16 August 1968) is an English former professional rugby league footballer and coach who played as a hooker or prop. He also worked in various roles for the Rugby Football League (RFL) between 2009 and 2024.

== Playing career ==
Born in St Helens, Rotheram moved to Doncaster at a young age, where he learned to play rugby league from the age of 14. In 1986, after moving south to study at the West London Institute, Rotheram signed with the city's professional rugby league team, then known as Fulham RLFC, and went on to make 150 first team appearances for the club.

He played in the 1993–94 Divisional Premiership final at Old Trafford, losing 22–30 against Workington Town.

In 1995, Rotheram suffered a serious knee injury which ended his playing career, and subsequently moved into coaching.

== Coaching career ==
Rotheram remained with the club (now known as London Broncos) on the coaching staff, and began as the club's Academy coach between 1996 and 1998.

In 2003, he joined his hometown club St Helens as assistant coach to Ian Millward. In May 2005, he briefly served as caretaker coach at Saints following Millward's suspension.

In November 2005, he was appointed as head coach at Whitehaven. He led the club to the final of the 2007 National League Cup, but left the club at the end of the season after his contract was not renewed.

Rotheram joined Workington Town as head coach in September 2007. He left the club in July 2009.

In 2009, he joined the Rugby Football League as National Player Development Manager, and later became Chief On-Field Officer. He stepped down from his role with the RFL in 2024.

== Outside of rugby league ==
During his playing career, Rotheram worked part-time as a physical education teacher at Chiswick Community School and later at Ashburton School.
