= Scott Roskell =

Australian rugby footballer

Personal information
- Born: 25 April 1969 (age 57) Australia

Playing information

Rugby league
- Position: Wing
Club
Years	Team	Pld	T	G	FG	P
1992–97	London Broncos	144	86	0	0	344

Rugby union
- Position: Centre
Club
Years	Team	Pld	T	G	FG	P
1997–01	London Welsh	69	37	0	0	185

Scott Roskell (born 20 April 1969) is an Australian former professional rugby union and rugby league footballer who played in the 1990s and 2000s. He played rugby union for London Welsh, and rugby league for the London Crusaders, as a wing or centre.

Roskell joined London Crusaders in August 1992. The club was later renamed to London Broncos, and Roskell went on to play for the club in the first two seasons of the Super League. He left the club in 1997, and switched to rugby union to play for London Welsh.

Roskell scored 86 tries for the Broncos – a club record until it was broken in 2012 by Luke Dorn.

In 2014, Roskell was an inaugural inductee to the London Broncos' Hall of Fame.
