= Mark Riley (rugby league) =

NZ rugby league footballer

Personal information
- Full name: Mark Riley
- Born: 16 June 1967 (age 59) New Zealand

Playing information
- Position: Scrum-half
Club
Years	Team	Pld	T	G	FG	P
1990	Otahuhu Leopards	0	0	0	0	0
1992–96	London Crusaders	94	62	2	0	250
1996–97	Swinton	45	30	0	0	120
	Total	139	92	2	0	370

Mark Riley (born 16 June 1967 in New Zealand) is a former rugby league footballer. He played for a number of English rugby league sides during the 1990s.

== Playing career ==
While playing for the Otahuhu Leopards in the Auckland Rugby League competition in 1990 he won the Best and Fairest award.

A scrum-half, Riley enjoyed a particularly successful season with the then London Crusaders in 1993–94, when he and wing Mark Johnson each challenged for the title of leading try-scorer in the second tier of English rugby league. He later went on to play a part in a successful promotion winning season with Swinton Lions in 1996, breaking the club's most tries in a match record, scoring 6 vs Prescot Panthers, 11 August 1996.
