= Mark Johnson (rugby league) =

South Africa international rugby league footballer

Personal information
- Born: 28 February 1969 (age 56) South Africa

Playing information
- Position: Wing
Club
Years	Team	Pld	T	G	FG	P
1993–95	London Crusaders	73	66	0	0	264
1995–96	Workington Town	32	13	0	0	52
1997–98	Hull FC	32	20	0	0	80
1999–00	Salford City Reds	34	16	0	0	64
	Total	171	115	0	0	460
Representative
Years	Team	Pld	T	G	FG	P
1995–00	South Africa	6	0	0	0	0

Mark Johnson (born 28 February 1969) is a South African former rugby union and professional rugby league footballer who represented South Africa in the 1995 Rugby League World Cup.

== Playing career ==
Johnson originally played rugby union in South Africa before joining the London Crusaders, a rugby league club.

Johnson went on to play for Workington Town, Hull FC and the Salford City Reds.

Between 1995 and 2000 Johnson played seven tests for South Africa.
