= Steve Rosolen =

Rugby league footballer

Personal information
- Full name: Steven Rosolen
- Born: 16 December 1966 (age 59) Australia

Playing information
- Position: Second-row
Club
Years	Team	Pld	T	G	FG	P
	Brisbane Norths
19??–91	North Sydney Bears
1991–98	London Broncos	171	31	0	0	124
	Total	171	31	0	0	124

Steve Rosolen (born 16 December 1966) is an Australian former professional rugby league footballer who played as a second-row forward for Brisbane Norths in the Brisbane Rugby League premiership, as well as the London Crusaders in the second division and their later incarnation as the London Broncos in the European Super League. He also played for the North Sydney Bears in their 1991 Reserve Grade Grand Final.

He first came to England on trial, but broke his arm 50 minutes into his first game for Salford.

For many years his 171 games played for the London club was a record.
