= 2026 York Knights season =

English rugby league team season

York Knights 2026 season
- 2026 Super League season Rank: 10th
- Play-off result: Did not qualify
- Challenge Cup: Quarter-finals
- 2026 record: Wins: 11; draws: 0; losses: 19
- Points scored: For: 545; against: 791

Team information
- Chairman: Clint Goodchild
- Head coach: Mark Applegarth
- Captain: Liam Harris Jesse Dee
- Stadium: York Community Stadium
- Agg. attendance: 5,849
- High attendance: 8,500; Hull Kingston Rovers, 12 February
- Low attendance: 4,014; Toulouse Olympique, 23 April

Top scorers
- Tries: David Nofoaluma (15)
- Goals: Cody Hunter (34)
- Points: Cody Hunter (88)
Home colours
← 2025	List of seasons	2027 →

The 2026 season was the York Knights's first season playing in England's top division of rugby league, following their ascension to the league through the IMG Grading system. They competed in the 2026 Super League season and the 2026 Challenge Cup.

== Preseason friendlies ==
Date and time	Versus	H/A	Venue	Result	Score	Tries	Goals	Attendance	Report
17 January; 15:00 (Note: Matty English's testimonial match)	Huddersfield Giants	A	Kirklees Stadium	L	4–22	Jones-Bishop	Richardson (0/1)		

== Super League ==
From 2026, the Super League expanded to 14 teams, with the York Knights being promoted alongside Toulouse Olympique from the RFL Championship via the Grading system. They joined the Bradford Bulls, who returned to the Super League for the first time since 2016 to replace the relegated Salford Red Devils.

A report by The i Paper revealed that chairman Clint Goodchild had asked the RFL governing body for a monthly £50,000 payment scheduled for June to be paid early to cover annual pitch renovations at the York Community Stadium, after money promised by the club's new investors after they applied to join the Super League did not materialise.

In August 2026, York announced that subject to approval by the RFL, they and the York Valkyrie had agreed a deal with a 'locally-based ownership group' headed by David Dickson to take majority shares in the club, with current chairman Clint Goodchild set to step down upon the deal's completion.

=== Fixtures ===
York Knights' Super League 2026 fixtures were released on 27 November 2025:

Date and time	Round	Versus	H/A	Venue	Result	Score	Tries	Goals	Attendance	TV	Pos.	Report
12 February; 20:00	Round 1	Hull Kingston Rovers	H	York Community Stadium	W	19–18	Wood (2), Galeano	Harris (3/3); Drop-goals: Hingano	8,500	Sky Sports + Main	7th	
20 February; 20:00	Round 2	Leeds Rhinos	A	Headingley Rugby Stadium	L	14–46	Vaughan, Thompson, Galeano	Harris (1/3)	15,232	Sky Sports +	11th	
27 February; 20:00	Round 3	Hull F.C.	A	MKM Stadium	W	17–16	Nofoaluma (2), Jones-Bishop	Richardson (2/3); Drop-goals: Richardson	12,716	Sky Sports +	7th	
6 March; 20:00	Round 4	Warrington Wolves	H	York Community Stadium	L	30–38	Jones-Bishop, Balmforth, Mata'afa, Vaughan, Harris	Richardson (5/5)	6,210	Sky Sports +	9th	
19 March; 20:00	Round 5	Wigan Warriors	A	Brick Community Stadium	L	22–23	Nofoaluma, Vaughan, Hingano	Richardson (3/3 + 2 pen.)	13,187	Sky Sports +	10th	
27 March; 20:00	Round 6	Wakefield Trinity	H	York Community Stadium	L	14–26	Wood, Jones-Bishop, Williams	Williams (1/3)	5,796	Sky Sports +	11th	
4 April; 15:00	Round 7 (Rivals Round)	Huddersfield Giants	A	Kirklees Stadium	L	14–34	Roberts, Nofoaluma, Williams	Roberts (1/3)	4,172	Sky Sports +	12th	
17 April; 20:00	Round 8	Leigh Leopards	H	York Community Stadium	L	6–18	Va'a	Harrison (1/1)	5,214	Sky Sports +	13th	
23 April; 20:00	Round 9	Toulouse Olympique	H	York Community Stadium	W	38–14	Galeano (3), Vaughan (2), Buchanan	Hunter (6/6 + 1 pen.)	4,014	Sky Sports + Main	10th	
1 May; 20:00	Round 10	St Helens	A	BrewDog Stadium	L	16–40	Dee (2), Galeano	Hunter (2/3)	10,342	Sky Sports +	10th	
16 May; 15:00	Round 11	Castleford Tigers	H	York Community Stadium	L	18–24	Vuniyayawa, Wood, Galeano	Hunter (3/3)	6,077	Sky Sports +	12th	
23 May; 20:00	Round 12	Catalans Dragons	H	York Community Stadium	L	22–36	Balmforth (2), Roberts, Nofoaluma	Hunter (3/5)	4,055	Sky Sports +	12th	
5 June; 20:00	Round 13	Bradford Bulls	A	Odsal Stadium	L	20–30	Nofoaluma (3), Harris	Hunter (2/4)	7,066	Sky Sports +	13th	
12 June; 20:00	Round 14	Hull Kingston Rovers	A	Craven Park	L	6–38	Bennison	Hunter (1/1)	11,408	Sky Sports +	13th	
20 June; 15:00	Round 15	Wigan Warriors	H	York Community Stadium	L	20–72	Hunter (2), Harris, Galeano	Hunter (2/4)	7,258	Sky Sports +	13th	
26 June; 20:00	Round 16	Castleford Tigers	A	Wheldon Road	W	20–14	Hunter, Field, Nofoaluma, Galeano	Hunter (2/4)	8,079	Sky Sports +	13th	
4 July; 12:30	Round 17 (Magic Weekend)	Huddersfield Giants	N	Hill Dickinson Stadium	W	36–24	Bennison (2), Hunter (2), Nofoaluma, Williams, Balmforth	Hunter (4/7)	34,539	Sky Sports + Main	12th	
9 July; 20:00	Round 18	Hull F.C.	H	York Community Stadium	W	20–16	Nofoaluma, Bennison, Balmforth, Williams	Hunter (0/1), Bennison (1/3 + 1 pen.)	5,359	Sky Sports +	10th	
18 July; 20:00 (BST)	Round 19	Toulouse Olympique	A	Stade Ernest Wallon	L	22–30	Field, Wood, Williams, Inman	Bennison (3/4)	3,450	Sky Sports +	11th	
25 July; 15:00	Round 20	Huddersfield Giants	H	York Community Stadium	L	22–24	Nofoaluma, Galeano, Thompson, Inman	Bennison (3/4)	4,025	Sky Sports +	11th	
1 August; 17:30	Round 21	St Helens	H	York Community Stadium	W	34–32	Field (2), Bennison, Balmforth, Vaughan, Williams	Bennison (5/6)	6,136	Sky Sports +	10th	
7 August; 20:00	Round 22	Leigh Leopards	A	Leigh Sports Village	L	14–22	Bennison (3)	Bennison (1/3)	8,249	Sky Sports +	10th	
13 August; 20:00 (Note: Fixture rearranged from 15 August to accommodate rescheduled Hull Kingston Rovers Round 2 fixture.)	Round 23	Warrington Wolves	A	Halliwell Jones Stadium	L	10–30	McShane, Bennison	Bennison (1/2)	9,015	Sky Sports +	11th	
23 August; 15:00	Round 24	Leeds Rhinos	H	York Community Stadium	L	16–66	Wood, Bennison, Nofoaluma	Bennison (2/3)	8,251	Sky Sports +	12th	
29 August; 17:30 (Note: Fixture moved ahead from 15:00 due to selection for live BBC broadcasting.)	Round 25	Wakefield Trinity	A	Belle Vue	L	12–28	Jones-Bishop, Va'a	Bennison (1/2 + 1 pen.)	7,982	BBC Two; Sky Sports +	13th	
5 September; 17:00 (BST)	Round 26	Catalans Dragons	A	Stade Gilbert Brutus	W	28–16	Field, Nofoaluma, Harris, Galeano, Vaughan	Hunter (4/5)	9,052	Sky Sports +	10th	
10 September; 20:00	Round 27	Bradford Bulls	H	York Community Stadium	W	35–12	Galeano, Jones-Bishop, Mata'afa, Dee, Va'a, Nofoaluma	Hunter (5/6); Drop-goals: Vaughan	5,136	Sky Sports +	10th	

=== Table ===
Pos	Team	Pld	W	D	L	PF	PA	PD	Pts	Qualification
1	Wigan Warriors (L)	27	22	0	5	851	439	+412	44	Advance to Semi-finals
2	Leeds Rhinos	27	20	0	7	904	426	+478	40	Advance to Semi-finals
3	Warrington Wolves (Y)	27	20	0	7	726	465	+261	40	Advance to Eliminators
4	Wakefield Trinity (C)	27	19	0	8	709	486	+223	38	Advance to Eliminators
5	Leigh Leopards	27	17	0	10	644	497	+147	34	Advance to Eliminators
6	Hull Kingston Rovers	27	16	0	11	748	503	+245	32	Advance to Eliminators
7	St Helens	27	15	0	12	636	614	+22	30	
8	Toulouse Olympique	27	10	0	17	578	704	−126	20	
9	Catalans Dragons	27	10	0	17	537	802	−265	20	
10	York Knights	27	9	0	18	545	791	−246	18	
11	Hull FC	27	8	0	19	488	597	−109	16	
12	Huddersfield Giants	27	8	0	19	509	765	−256	16	
13	Castleford Tigers	27	8	0	19	464	866	−402	16	
14	Bradford Bulls	27	7	0	20	468	852	−384	14	

Updated to match(es) played on 12 September 2026. Source:
(C) Champions; (L) League Leaders' Shield Winners; (Y) Runners up

== Challenge Cup ==
The York Knights were first drawn on 12 January to play the Barrow Raiders, following Barrow's 76-4 defeat of Wigan St Judes in their Round 2 fixture on 24 January. Following their victory against Barrow, York beat the Keighley Cougars at home, qualifying them for the quarter-finals. The York Knights were ultimately knocked out of the 2026 Challenge Cup after being beaten 48-10 away by 2025 cup winners Hull Kingston Rovers.

Date and time	Round	Versus	H/A	Venue	Result	Score	Tries	Goals	Attendance	TV	Report
7 February; 18:00	Round 3	Barrow Raiders	A	Craven Park (Barrow)	W	32–6	Williams (2), Mata'afa, Martin, Dee, Field, Vaughan	Harris (1/5), Williams (1/2)	1,389	Not televised	
14 March; 12:00	Round 4	Keighley Cougars	H	York Community Stadium	W	56–10	Harris (2), Vuniyayawa, Wood, Balmforth, Dee, Griffin, Jones-Bishop, Hingano, Williams	Harris (3/6), McShane (2/4), Williams (1/1)	2,008	Not televised	
11 April; 13:30	Quarter-finals	Hull Kingston Rovers	A	Craven Park (Hull)	L	10–48	Va'a, Harrison	Harrison (1/2)	8,752	BBC Two	

== Transfers ==
=== Gains ===
Player	Club	Contract	Date
(Australia) Paul Vaughan	Warrington Wolves	2 years	July 2025
(England) Josh Griffin	Wakefield Trinity	1 year	August 2025
(Australia) Jordan Lipp	Norths Devils	1 year	August 2025
(England) Sam Wood	Castleford Tigers		October 2025
(France) Justin Sangaré	Salford Red Devils		October 2025
(England) Jon Bennison	St Helens		October 2025
(England) Jack Smith	Leeds Rhinos	1 year	October 2025
(England) Danny Richardson	Hull Kingston Rovers	2 years	October 2025
(England) Matty Foster	Oldham R.L.F.C.	1 year	October 2025
(Australia) Ryan Jackson	Central Queensland Capras		November 2025
(Australia) John Sagaga	Penrith Panthers		November 2025
(England) Leo Tennison	Hull Kingston Rovers	1 year	November 2025
(England) Will Roberts	St Helens		January 2026
(New Zealand) Nikau Williams	N/A		January 2026
(Samoa) Xavier Va'a	Sydney Roosters	2 years	January 2026
(England) Tom Inman	Halifax Panthers	End of season	February 2026
(England) Thomas Doyle	Wakefield Trinity	2 years	August 2026

==== Loans in ====
Player	Club	Loan period	Date
(Wales) Denive Balmforth	Hull F.C.	End of season	November 2025
(Fiji) King Vuniyayawa	Newcastle Thunder	Rolling monthly	February 2026
(Serbia) David Nofoaluma	Newcastle Thunder (Note: Nofoaluma signed as a free agent to Newcastle Thunder following the liquidation of Halifax Panthers.)	End of season	February 2026
(England) Myles Harrison	Newcastle Thunder		February 2026
(England) Matty English	Huddersfield Giants	End of season	July 2026
(England) Andy Djeukessi	Newcastle Thunder	1 week	July 2026

=== Losses ===
Player	Club	Contract	Date
(England) Connor Bailey	Hull F.C.	2 years	September 2025
(Wales) James Farrar	TBC		October 2025
(England) Jacob Gannon	TBC		October 2025
(England) Jack Potter	TBC		October 2025
(England) Joe Brown	Sheffield Eagles	2 years	October 2025
(England) Connor Fitzsimmons	Sheffield Eagles	2 years	October 2025
(Wales) Bailey Antrobus	Newcastle Thunder	1 year	December 2025
(New Zealand) Sam Cook	Newcastle Thunder	1 year	December 2025
(England) Joe Law	Newcastle Thunder		December 2025
(Wales) Jude Ferreira	Newcastle Thunder		December 2025
(England) Brad Ward	Newcastle Thunder		January 2026
(England) Harvey Reynolds	Newcastle Thunder		January 2026
(England) Myles Harrison	Newcastle Thunder		January 2026
(Italy) Brenden Santi	Newcastle Thunder		January 2026
(Tonga) Ukuma Ta'ai	Newcastle Thunder		January 2026
(Ireland) Jack Brown	Newcastle Thunder		January 2026
(England) Josh Griffin	N/A	Retirement	June 2026

==== Loans out ====
Player	Club	Loan period	Date
(England) Danny Richardson	Widnes Vikings	End of season	June 2026

== Squad ==
2026 York Knights squad
First team squad			Coaching staff
1 (Samoa) Toa Mata'afa – FB, WG, CE; 2 (Jamaica) Ben Jones-Bishop – WG, FB; 3 (Australia) Jordan Lipp – CE, SH; 4 (England) Sam Wood – CE; 5 (Australia) Scott Galeano – WG, CE; 6 (Tonga) Ata Hingano – SO, SH, HK; 7 (England) Liam Harris (c) – SH, SO (gk); 8 (Australia) Jack Martin – PR; 9 (England) Paul McShane – HK, SH; 10 (Australia) Paul Vaughan – PR; 11 (England) Josh Griffin – SR; 12 (Australia) Jesse Dee (c) – CE, LF; 13 (England) Jordan Thompson – SR, LF, CE	14 (Wales) Denive Balmforth – HK; 15 (Samoa) Xavier Va'a – PR; 16 (France) Justin Sangaré – PR; 17 (England) Kieran Hudson – PR; 19 (England) Danny Richardson – SH, SO; 20 (England) Oli Field – SR, CE; 21 (Scotland) Kieran Buchanan – CE, WG, FB; 22 (Australia) John Sagaga – PR; 23 (England) Jon Bennison – WG, FB; 24 (England) Will Dagger – FB, WG; 25 (England) Jack Smith – WG (gk); 26 (New Zealand) Nikau Williams – SH, SO; 27 (England) Matty Foster – SR	28 (Australia) Ryan Jackson – PR; 29 (New Zealand) Sam Cook – HK; 30 (England) Harvey Reynolds – SR, PR; 31 (Fiji) King Vuniyayawa – PR, SR; 33 (England) Andy Djeukessi – WG; 36 (England) Brad Ward – WG; 37 (Australia) Cody Hunter – SH; 38 (England) Will Roberts – SO, SH; 40 (England) Taylor Pemberton – HK; 41 (New Zealand) Mitch Clark – SR, PR; 46 (Serbia) David Nofoaluma – WG, FB, CE; 48 (England) Tom Inman – HK, SO; 49 (England) Matty English – PR, LF	Head coach: (England) Mark Applegarth; Assistant coaches: (England) Chris Thorman; (England) Graham Steadman; Legend: (c) Captain(s); (vc) Vice-captain(s); (red card) = suspended; = injured; (gk) = Goal kicker; Updated: 10 September 2026; Source(s): Knights Squad, York Knights 2026 Squad Numbers!
