= 2025 RFL Championship =

Rugby league competition in the United Kingdom

- Duration: February – October 2025
- Teams: 13
- Matches played: 156 (regular season) + 5 (play-offs)
- Points scored: 6927 (regular season) + 190 (play-offs)
- Highest attendance: 5,390; Toulouse Olympique vs Hunslet R.L.F.C. (22 March 2025)
- Lowest attendance: 627; Sheffield Eagles vs Batley Bulldogs (25 April 2025)
- Average attendance: 1,326
- Total attendance: 213,553

2025 season
- Grand Final winners: Toulouse Olympique
- League Leaders' Shield: York Knights
- Biggest home win: 66–0 (York Knights v Doncaster, 13 April)
- Biggest away win: 6–72 (Sheffield Eagles at Hunslet, 29 June)
- Top point-scorer: Liam Harris (232)
- Top try-scorer: Ben Jones-Bishop (29)

The 2025 RFL Championship (officially known as the Betfred Championship for sponsorship reasons) is a professional rugby league club competition. The second tier of the British rugby league system comprises 13 clubs – 12 from England and one from France.

The season comprised 26 rounds in the regular season with each team playing 24 fixtures and having two bye weeks. The top six teams took part in the play-offs to determine the champions. The Championship was won by Toulouse Olympique who finished second in the regular season behind League Leaders' Shield winners York Knights. The two met in the Grand Final on 5 October when Toulouse won 10–8.

== Team changes ==
Wakefield Trinity won promotion to the Super League at the end of 2024 and were replaced by London Broncos who were relegated from Super League under the IMG grading system. Promoted from League One in 2024 were Oldham and Hunslet who replaced the 2024 relegated teams, Swinton Lions, Whitehaven and Dewsbury Rams.

== Structure changes ==
There was no automatic promotion from the Championship to Super League at the end of the season. This is due to the IMG grading scheme where clubs are graded by a number of factors, not all based on on-field performance.

Following a review of the league structure below Super League, the RFL announced that by the start of the 2026 season, the Championship and League 1 would be equalised in size at 12 teams each. In March 2024 the RFL completed the review and announced that the first steps will be taken to equalise the number of teams in the Championship and League One at 12 each by the start of the 2026 season. Following the 2-up, 3-down system in 2024, 2025 would have see the return of the Super 8s format with the top four teams in League One meeting the bottom four teams in the Championship to decide which division those clubs will play in for 2026. However, following the decision to expand Super League from 12 to 14 clubs from 2026, the decision was taken on 27 August 2025 to merge the Championship and League One competitions for 2026. The Super 8s therefore became redundant and were cancelled.

== Rule changes ==
Three rule changes are brought in for 2025:

- Kick chasers will only be offside if they are influencing the play rather than automatically being offside for being within 10 metres.
- Drop-outs that fail to travel 10 metres or go out on the full, result in a play-the-ball rather than a penalty.
- Attacking players as well as defending players can be green-carded if play has to be stopped due to an injury. Previously only defending players could be green-carded.

== Clubs ==
Locations of English teams competing in the 2025 Championship.
Locations of the 2025 RFL Championship teams in West Yorkshire
Locations of 2025 RFL Championship teams in France

| Team | Location | Stadium | Capacity |
|---|---|---|---|
| Barrow Raiders | Barrow-in-Furness | Craven Park | 4,000 |
| Batley Bulldogs | Batley | Mount Pleasant | 7,500 |
| Bradford Bulls | Bradford | Odsal Stadium | 22,000 |
| Doncaster | Doncaster | Eco-Power Stadium | 15,231 |
| Featherstone Rovers | Featherstone | Post Office Road | 8,000 |
| Halifax Panthers | Halifax | The Shay | 10,401 |
| Hunslet | Hunslet, Leeds | South Leeds Stadium | 3,450 |
| London Broncos | Wimbledon, London | Plough Lane | 9,215 |
| Oldham | Oldham | Boundary Park | 13,186 |
| Sheffield Eagles | Sheffield | Steel City Stadium | 1,320 |
| Toulouse Olympique | Toulouse | Stade Ernest-Wallon | 19,500 |
| Widnes Vikings | Widnes | DCBL Stadium | 13,350 |
| York Knights | York | York Community Stadium | 8,500 |

== Standings ==
| Pos | Team | Pld | W | D | L | PF | PA | PD | Pts | Qualification |
|---|---|---|---|---|---|---|---|---|---|---|
| 1 | York Knights (L, Y) | 24 | 20 | 0 | 4 | 764 | 299 | +465 | 40 | Semi-finals |
| 2 | Toulouse Olympique (C) | 24 | 19 | 0 | 5 | 651 | 314 | +337 | 38 | Semi-finals |
| 3 | Bradford Bulls | 24 | 18 | 0 | 6 | 678 | 366 | +312 | 36 | Eliminators |
| 4 | Oldham | 24 | 15 | 2 | 7 | 602 | 450 | +152 | 32 | Eliminators |
| 5 | Halifax Panthers | 24 | 14 | 1 | 9 | 594 | 424 | +170 | 29 | Eliminators |
| 6 | Featherstone Rovers | 24 | 14 | 0 | 10 | 640 | 461 | +179 | 28 | Eliminators |
| 7 | Widnes Vikings | 24 | 11 | 2 | 11 | 454 | 475 | −21 | 24 | |
| 8 | Doncaster | 24 | 11 | 0 | 13 | 528 | 533 | −5 | 22 | |
| 9 | Barrow Raiders | 24 | 10 | 1 | 13 | 525 | 559 | −34 | 21 | |
| 10 | London Broncos | 24 | 8 | 0 | 16 | 468 | 548 | −80 | 16 | |
| 11 | Sheffield Eagles | 24 | 6 | 0 | 18 | 381 | 689 | −308 | 12 | |
| 12 | Batley Bulldogs | 24 | 4 | 2 | 18 | 386 | 751 | −365 | 10 | |
| 13 | Hunslet | 24 | 2 | 0 | 22 | 256 | 1058 | −802 | 4 | |

Source: RFL
Rules for classification: 1) Competition points; 2) Points difference; 3) Points percentage (points scored/points conceded x 100)
(C) Champions; (L) League Leaders Shield; (Y) Runners-up

== Play-offs ==
=== Team bracket ===
Eliminators
4 | Oldham | 4
5 | Halifax Panthers | 40
3 | Bradford Bulls | 28
6 | Featherstone Rovers | 8

Semi-finals
1 | York Knights | 30
5 | Halifax Panthers | 18
2 | Toulouse Olympique | 24
3 | Bradford Bulls | 20

Grand Final
1 | York Knights | 8
2 | Toulouse Olympique | 10

=== Week 1: Eliminators ===
19 September
19:45

| Bradford Bulls | 28–8 | Featherstone Rovers |
|---|---|---|
| Tries: Okunbor (2), Taufua (2), Scurr; Goals: Lilley (1), Hooley (3) | | Tries: Aekins; Goals: Addy (2) |

Odsal Stadium
Referee: S. Mikalauskas

19 September
20:00

| Oldham | 4–40 | Halifax Panthers |
|---|---|---|
| Tries: Ryan | | Tries: C. Graham (2), Douglas, Crooks, Nofoaluma, Woodburn-Hall, Fairbank; Goals: Whitby (6) |

Boundary Park
Attendance: 2,667
Referee: M. Lynn

=== Week 2: Semi-finals ===
27 September
18:00

| York Knights | 30–18 | Halifax Panthers |
|---|---|---|
| Tries: Jones-Bishop, Galeano, Buchanan, Mata'afa (2); Goals: Harris (5/7) | | Tries: Johnson, Crooks, Douglas; Goals: Whitby (3/3) |

York Community Stadium
Referee: T. Grant

28 September
16:00

| Toulouse Olympique | 24–20 | Bradford Bulls |
|---|---|---|
| Tries: Ashall-Bott (2), Rennie, Ulberg; Goals: Shorrocks (4/4) | | Tries: Blake, Gee, Okunbor (2); Goals: Hooley (2/4) |

Stade Ernest-Wallon
Attendance: 3,245
Referee: A. Moore

=== Week 3: Championship Grand Final ===
5 October
14:00

| York Knights | 8–10 | Toulouse Olympique |
|---|---|---|
| Tries: Mataafa, Buchanan; Goals: Harris (0/2) | | Goals: Shorrocks (5/5) |

York Community Stadium
Referee: T. Grant

Team details
| York Knights | | Position | Toulouse Olympique |
| Name | Number | Position | Number | Name |
|---|---|---|---|---|
| Toa Mata’afa | 36 | FB | 1 | Olly Ashall-Bott |
| Ben Jones-Bishop | 34 | WG | 5 | Paul Marcon |
| Kieran Buchanan | 3 | CE | 26 | Romeo Tropis |
| Oli Field | 20 | CE | 3 | Reubenn Rennie |
| Scott Galeano | 35 | WG | 2 | Paul Ulberg |
| Ata Hingano | 6 | SO | 25 | Thomas Lacans |
| Liam Harris | 7 | SH | 7 | Jake Shorrocks |
| Jack Martin | 8 | PR | 8 | Lambert Belmas |
| Paul McShane | 9 | HK | 35 | Brendan Hands |
| Bailey Antrobus | 25 | PF | 17 | Rob Butler |
| Jesse Dee | 11 | SR | 4 | Mathieu Jussaume |
| Connor Bailey | 12 | SR | 11 | Maxime Stefani |
| Jordan Thompson | 13 | LF | 13 | Anthony Marion |
| Brenden Santi | 10 | IN | 10 | James Roumanos |
| Sam Cook | 20 | IN | 15 | Joe Cator |
| Kieran Hudson | 31 | IN | 16 | Joe Bretherton |
| Mitch Clark | 33 | IN | 28 | AJ Wallace |
| Mark Applegarth | | Coach | | Sylvain Houles |

== Player statistics ==
=== Top 10 try scorers ===
| Rank | Player (s) | Club | Tries |
|---|---|---|---|
| 1 | (Jamaica) Ben Jones-Bishop | York Knights | 29 |
| 2 | (Papua New Guinea) Edene Gebbie | Doncaster RLFC | 25 |
| 3 | (England) Olly Ashall-Bott | Toulouse Olympique | 23 |
| 4 | (France) Benjamin Laguerre | Toulouse Olympique | 22 |
| 5 | (Australia) Jayden Okunbor | Bradford Bulls | 21 |
| 6 | (Australia) Scott Galeano | York Knights | 19 |
| 7 | (England) Liam Tindall | London Broncos | 16 |
| 8 | (England) Guy Armitage | Bradford Bulls | 15 |
| 8 | (England) Derrell Olpherts | Featherstone Rovers | 15 |
| 10 | (Fiji) Waqa Blake | Bradford Bulls | 13 |
| 10 | (England) Liam Harris | York Knights | 13 |

=== Top 10 goal scorers ===
| Rank | Player (s) | Club | Goals |
|---|---|---|---|
| 1 | (England) Jake Shorrocks | Toulouse Olympique | 100 |
| 2 | (England) Liam Harris | York Knights | 89 |
| 3 | (England) Ben Reynolds | Featherstone Rovers | 70 |
| 4 | (England) Connor Robinson | Doncaster RLFC | 64 |
| 5 | (England) Luke Hooley | Bradford Bulls | 56 |
| 6 | (Australia) Josh Drinkwater | Oldham RLFC | 54 |
| 7 | (England) Jordan Lilley | Bradford Bulls | 52 |
| 8 | (England) Jack Smith | London Broncos | 49 |
| 9 | (England) Brad Walker | Barrow Raiders | 44 |
| 10 | (France) Louis Jouffret | Halifax Panthers | 43 |

=== Top 10 points scorers ===
| Rank | Player (s) | Club | Points |
|---|---|---|---|
| 1 | (England) Liam Harris | York Knights | 232 |
| 2 | (England) Jake Shorrocks | Toulouse Olympique | 209 |
| 3 | (England) Ben Reynolds | Featherstone Rovers | 164 |
| 4 | (England) Luke Hooley | Bradford Bulls | 140 |
| 4 | (England) Connor Robinson | Doncaster RLFC | 140 |
| 4 | (Australia) Josh Drinkwater | Oldham RLFC | 140 |
| 7 | (England) Jordan Lilley | Bradford Bulls | 128 |
| 8 | (England) Jack Smith | London Broncos | 118 |
| 9 | (Jamaica) Ben Jones-Bishop | York Knights | 116 |
| 10 | (France) Louis Jouffret | Halifax Panthers | 110 |

As of 5 October 2025: (Playoff final)

== Discipline ==
=== Red cards ===
| Rank | Player | Club | Cards |
|---|---|---|---|
| 1 | (England) Alex Bishop | Barrow Raiders | 1 |
| 1 | (Scotland) Bayley Liu | Bradford Bulls | 1 |
| 1 | (Papua New Guinea) Edene Gebbie | Doncaster RLFC | 1 |
| 1 | (Samoa) Suaia Matagi | Doncaster RLFC | 1 |
| 1 | (England) Ben Reynolds | Featherstone Rovers | 1 |
| 1 | (Republic of Ireland) Sam Campbell | Hunslet RLFC | 1 |
| 1 | (England) Matthew Fletcher | Hunslet RLFC | 1 |

=== Yellow cards ===
| Rank | Player | Club | Cards |
|---|---|---|---|
| 1 | (Republic of Ireland) Keelan Foster | Hunslet RLFC | 3 |
| 2 | (Italy) Ryan King | Barrow Raiders | 2 |
| 2 | (England) Curtis Teare | Barrow Raiders | 2 |
| 2 | (England) Ronan Dixon | Halifax Panthers | 2 |
| 2 | (England) Adam Lawton | Widnes Vikings | 2 |
| 6 | (England) Alex Bishop | Barrow Raiders | 1 |
| 6 | (England) Ryan Brown | Barrow Raiders | 1 |
| 6 | (England) Ryan Johnston | Barrow Raiders | 1 |
| 6 | (England) James Meadows | Bradford Bulls | 1 |
| 6 | (Albania) Eliot Peposhi | Bradford Bulls | 1 |
| 6 | (England) Ebon Scurr | Bradford Bulls | 1 |
| 6 | (Samoa) Suaia Matagi | Doncaster RLFC | 1 |
| 6 | (Australia) Pauli Pauli | Doncaster RLFC | 1 |
| 6 | (England) Connor Robinson | Doncaster RLFC | 1 |
| 6 | (Scotland) Danny Addy | Featherstone Rovers | 1 |
| 6 | (England) Connor Jones | Featherstone Rovers | 1 |
| 6 | (France) Gadwin Springer | Featherstone Rovers | 1 |
| 6 | (Fiji) King Vuniyayawa | Featherstone Rovers | 1 |
| 6 | (England) William Calcott | Halifax Panthers | 1 |
| 6 | (England) Jacob Fairbank | Halifax Panthers | 1 |
| 6 | (England) Vila Halafihi | Halifax Panthers | 1 |
| 6 | (Republic of Ireland) Zack McComb | Halifax Panthers | 1 |
| 6 | (Republic of Ireland) Sam Campbell | Hunslet RLFC | 1 |
| 6 | (Australia) Lachlan Hanneghan | Hunslet RLFC | 1 |
| 6 | (France) Kevin Larroyer | Hunslet RLFC | 1 |
| 6 | (England) Coby Nichol | Hunslet RLFC | 1 |
| 6 | (Republic of Ireland) Ethan O'Hanlon | Hunslet RLFC | 1 |
| 6 | (England) Jordan Syme | Hunslet RLFC | 1 |
| 6 | (England) Mackenzie Turner | Hunslet RLFC | 1 |
| 6 | (England) Ben Davies | Oldham RLFC | 1 |
| 6 | (England) Eddie Battye | Sheffield Eagles | 1 |
| 6 | (England) Alex Foster | Sheffield Eagles | 1 |
| 6 | (England) Evan Hodgson | Sheffield Eagles | 1 |
| 6 | (England) Kris Welham | Sheffield Eagles | 1 |
| 6 | (England) Robert Butler | Toulouse Olympique | 1 |
| 6 | (England) Joe Cator | Toulouse Olympique | 1 |
| 6 | (England) Ellis Gillam | Toulouse Olympique | 1 |
| 6 | (France) Baptiste Rodriguez | Toulouse Olympique | 1 |
| 6 | (Wales) Mike Butt | Widnes Vikings | 1 |
| 6 | (Australia) Ben Condon | Widnes Vikings | 1 |
| 6 | (England) Nick Gregson | Widnes Vikings | 1 |
| 6 | (Wales) Bailey Antrobus | York Knights | 1 |
| 6 | (New Zealand) Sam Cook | York Knights | 1 |
| 6 | (Australia) Jesse Dee | York Knights | 1 |
| 6 | (Tonga) Ata Hingano | York Knights | 1 |

As of 18 September 2025: (Round 24)
