= 2025 RFL 1895 Cup =

Rugby league competition in the United Kingdom

- Duration: February – June 2025
- Number of teams: 23
- Winners: York Knights
- Runners-up: Featherstone Rovers

The 2025 RFL 1895 Cup (also known as the 2025 AB Sundecks 1895 Cup) was the sixth staging of the RFL 1895 Cup, a rugby league competition for English and Welsh clubs competing in the Championship and League One.

== Format ==
Once again, the tournament for 2025 had a revised format from previous years. For the first time, all British clubs from the two divisions entered the tournament (with French club Toulouse not participating). After the group format used in 2024, the competition reverted to a knockout tournament. The 11 League One clubs competed across two preliminary rounds to produce four qualifiers who joined the 12 Championship clubs in the first round.

The final was played at Wembley Stadium on 7 June 2025 alongside the finals of the Challenge Cup and the Women's Challenge Cup.

== Preliminary rounds ==
The draw for the preliminary rounds was made in December 2024. Three first preliminary round ties were drawn with the five undrawn teams gaining a bye to the second preliminary round.

First preliminary round
Home	Score	Away	Match Information
Home	Score	Away	Date and Time	Venue	Referee	Attendance
Rochdale Hornets	64–12	Cornwall	1 February, 14:00	Mayfield Sports Centre	L. Bland
Midlands Hurricanes	52–24	Whitehaven	2 February, 14:00	Alexander Stadium	A. Williams
Newcastle Thunder	0–60	North Wales Crusaders	2 February, 15:00	Crow Trees Ground	A. Sweet

Second preliminary round
Home	Score	Away	Match Information
Home	Score	Away	Date and Time	Venue	Referee	Attendance
Goole Vikings	26–18	North Wales Crusaders	16 February, 15:00	Victoria Pleasure Grounds	L. Bland	256
Keighley Cougars	7–6	Midlands Hurricanes	16 February, 15:00	Cougar Park	A. Williams
Rochdale Hornets	18–16	Swinton Lions	16 February, 15:00	Spotland	A. Belafonte	483
Workington Town	10–18	Dewsbury Rams	16 February, 15:00	Derwent Park	T. Jones

== First Round ==
First round
Home	Score	Away	Match Information
Home	Score	Away	Date and Time	Venue	Referee	Attendance
London Broncos	26–16	Dewsbury Rams	1 March, 15:00	New River Stadium	A. Belafonte
Batley Bulldogs	12–16	Bradford Bulls	2 March, 14:00	Mount Pleasant	S. Mikalauskas
Featherstone Rovers	52–12	Keighley Cougars	2 March, 14:00	Post Office Road	K. Moore
Goole Vikings	16–34	Barrow Raiders	2 March, 15:00	Victoria Pleasure Grounds	C. Worsley
Hunslet	26–28	Widnes Vikings	2 March, 15:00	South Leeds Stadium	D. Arnold	562
Oldham	58–6	Rochdale Hornets	2 March, 15:00	Boundary Park	J. Vella	1,057
Sheffield Eagles	50–18	Doncaster	2 March, 15:00	Sheffield Olympic Legacy Stadium	M. Lynn	648
York Knights	32–20	Halifax Panthers	2 March, 15:00	York Community Stadium	R. Cox

== Quarter finals ==
The draw for the quarter finals was made on 2 March. The ties were played over the weekend of 5/6 April.

Quarter finals
Home	Score	Away	Match Information
Home	Score	Away	Date and Time	Venue	Referee	Attendance
Bradford Bulls	36–20	Sheffield Eagles	6 April 2025, 15:00	Odsal Stadium	M. Lynn	1,606
Featherstone Rovers	34–6	London Broncos	6 April 2025, 15:00	Post Office Road	K. Moore
Oldham	38–24	Barrow Raiders	6 April 2025, 15:00	Boundary Park	S. Mikalauskas	1,400
York Knights	39–6	Widnes Vikings	6 April 2025, 15:00	York Community Stadium	R. Cox

== Semi finals ==
The draw for the semi finals was made on 13 April. The ties were played over the weekend of 17/18 May.

Semi finals
Home	Score	Away	Match Information
Home	Score	Away	Date and Time	Venue	Referee	Attendance
Oldham	10–40	Featherstone Rovers	18 May 2025, 14:00	Boundary Park	S. Mikalauskas	2,843
York Knights	28–20	Bradford Bulls	18 May 2025, 15:00	York Community Stadium	C. Worsley

== Final ==
The final was played on 7 June.

7 June 2025
17:45 BST

Featherstone Rovers	4–5 (g.p.)	York Knights
Goals: Reynolds 12' (pen), 61' (pen)		Goals: Harris 29' (pen), 40' (pen); Drop goals: Harris 85'

Wembley Stadium, London
Referee: L. Rush
Touch judges: C. Worsley, M. Lynn
