= Harvey Reynolds =

English rugby league footballer (born 2004)

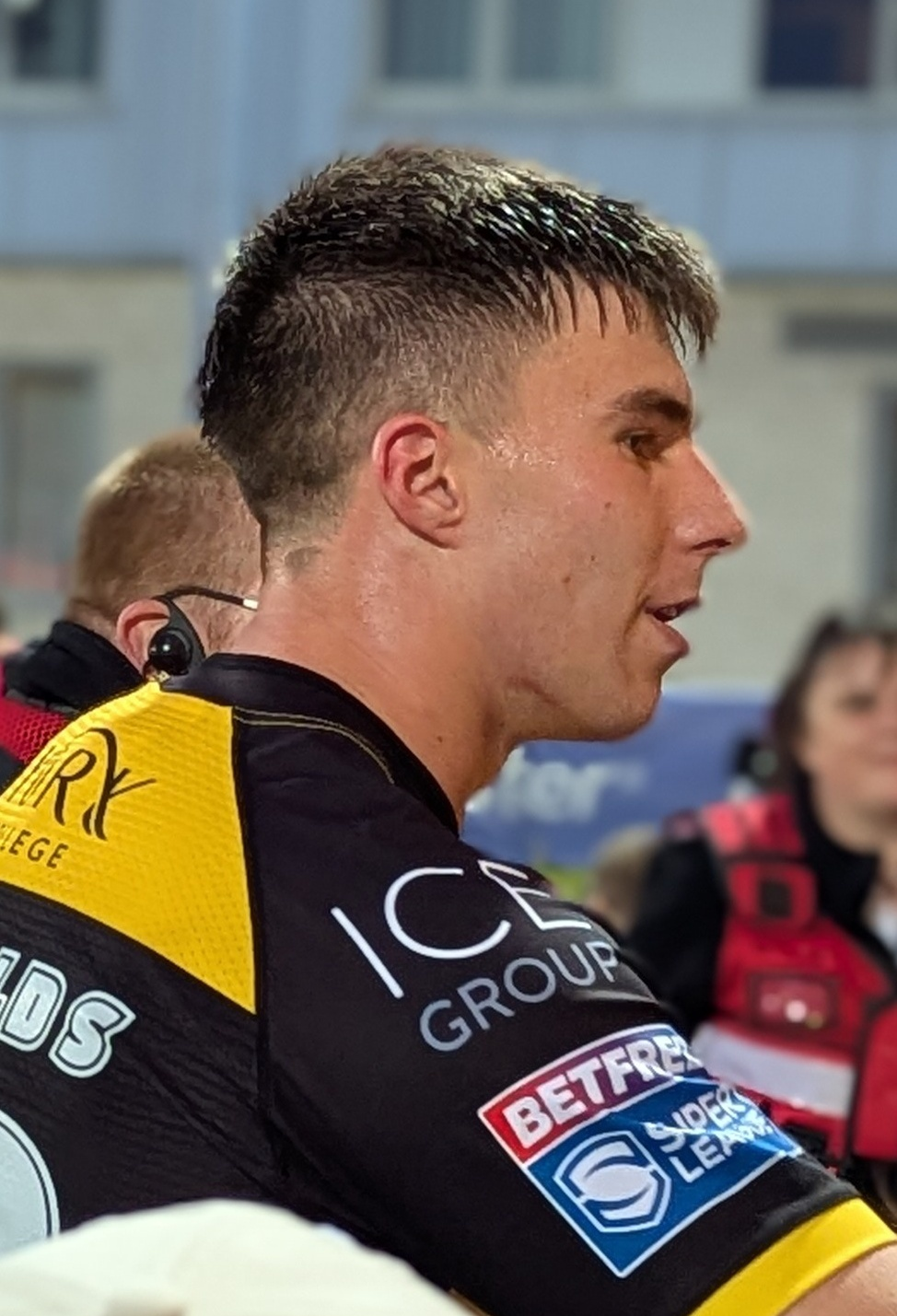
- Reynolds in 2026

Personal information
- Born: 2 February 2004 (age 22)
- Height: 6 ft 3 in (1.91 m)

Playing information
- Position: Second-row
Club
Years	Team	Pld	T	G	FG	P
2024–25	York Knights	25	2	0	0	8
2024(DR)	→ Newcastle Thunder	2	0	0	0	0
2026–	Newcastle Thunder	24	10	0	0	40
2026(loan)	→ York Knights	4	0	0	0	0
2027–	York Knights	0	0	0	0	0
	Total	55	12	0	0	48
- Source: As of 3 November 2026

Harvey Reynolds (born 2 February 2004) is an English rugby league footballer who plays a second-row for the York Knights in the Super League.

== Early life and career ==
Reynolds was born on 2 February 2004 and was a junior with East Hull before joining Hull Kingston Rovers' academy. He signed a two-year contract with Hull KR on 10 September 2022 to join the club's first team before being released at the end of the 2023 Super League season.

=== York Knights ===
Reynolds signed for the York Knights on 9 November 2023 ahead of the 2024 RFL Championship season. Having been signed to provide back-up to the first team, he impressed head coach Andrew Henderson in training and made his debut on 27 January 2024 in a 114–10 win away to Newcastle Thunder, in which he scored a try. Reynolds made 13 appearances for the Knights across the season, and also made two appearances for Newcastle Thunder on dual registration terms in the 2024 RFL League One.

He signed a new contract with York for the 2025 RFL Championship season on 3 December 2024. He made 12 appearances this season, in which York won the RFL 1895 Cup and RFL Championship Leaders' Shield. After the Knights' promotion to the Super League,

=== Newcastle Thunder ===
Reynolds signed for Newcastle Thunder for the 2026 RFL Championship on 8 January 2026. He returned to the Knights on 3 June on loan, and made his Super League debut two days later in a 30–20 defeat away to the Bradford Bulls.

=== York Knights (re-join) ===
On 3 November 2026 it was reported that he had re-joined York Knights in the Super League

== Career statistics ==
As of match played 26 September 2026

Appearances and points by club, season, and level
Club	Season	Level	App	T	G	FG	P
York Knights	2024	RFL Championship	13	1	0	0	4
York Knights	2025	RFL Championship	12	1	0	0	4
York Knights	Total		25	2	0	0	8
Newcastle Thunder (DR)	2024	RFL League One	2	0	0	0	0
Newcastle Thunder	2026	RFL Championship	24	10	0	0	40
York Knights (loan)	2026	Super League	4	0	0	0	0
York Knights	2027	Super League	0	0	0	0	0
Career total			55	12	0	0	48

== Honours ==
York Knights

- RFL 1895 Cup: 2025
- RFL Championship Leaders' Shield: 2025
