= Chris Parker (rugby league) =

Rugby coach and former Malta international rugby league footballer

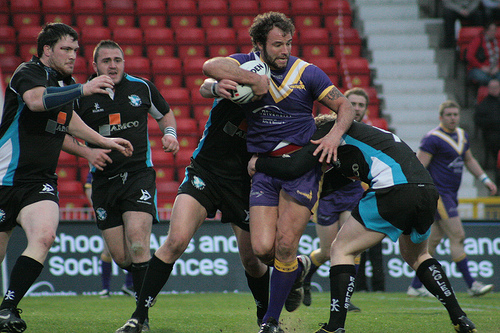

Personal information
- Full name: Christopher Parker
- Born: 5 December 1982 (age 43) Winlaton, Gateshead, England

Playing information
- Position: prop
Club
Years	Team	Pld	T	G	FG	P
2005–12	Gateshead Thunder	104	2	0	0	4
Representative
Years	Team	Pld	T	G	FG	P
2009–12	Malta	8	5	1	0	22

Christopher Parker (born 5 December 1982) is a former professional rugby league footballer. A prop forward, he made over 100 appearances for Gateshead Thunder, and captained the Malta national rugby league team.

== Career ==
Chris started his rugby career at Blaydon RUFC at 15 years old. Having stints at Newcastle Falcons Academy and representing his county.

=== British Army ===
In 2000 he joined the British Army, Royal Signals Corps. During his six years of service, he represented the Royal Corps of Signals in both rugby union and league as well as representing the army rugby league at U-21 level and the combined services academy.

=== Newcastle Knights ===
Chris started his amateur rugby league career at Newcastle Knights ARLFC having two seasons under coach and Gateshead Thunder player Steven Rutherford.

=== Gateshead Storm ===
Chris then moved to the north east's highest amateur team Gateshead Storm RLFC playing with Storm greats such as Harry Gee and Andrew Pybus.

=== Gateshead Thunder ===
He enjoyed 3 seasons with Gateshead Storm as well as stints with Union sides Blaydon and Winlaton before eventually being given a trial at Gateshead Thunder RLFC by coach Dave Woods.

Chris featured in a few games in the 2007 season most notably receiving man of the match against Celtic Crusaders in the final game of the season, Chris also was rewarded with a one-year contract for the 2008 season.

In 2008 Gateshead Thunder, transformed from a bottom of the league side to a National League Two winning side attaining promotion to the newly named Championship. Chris was awarded the most improved player for 2008 and was given a new one-year deal for 2009. Chris started the 2009 season well playing 18 consecutive games scoring his first-ever Gateshead Thunder. try against Rochdale Hornets in the Northern Rail Cup and adding to his tally with a well-taken try in front of the sky sports cameras against the Sheffield Eagles. Chris spent the last part of the 2009 season as Gateshead's 18th man.

After the holding company of Gateshead Thunder decided to wind up all contract were cancelled, Chris re-signed for the newly formed Gateshead Thunder side to play in Championship One in 2010. In 2010 Chris made 24 appearances for Gateshead Thunder, only missing one game for a Malta fixture against Norway.

=== Gateshead Storm (re-joined) ===
In May 2012 after making 5 appearances for Gateshead Thunder Chris decided to call it a day and retire from semi-professional rugby, he returned to his roots and joined North East Conference side Gateshead Storm as player/assistant coach and U13s Head Coach. In his first season back at Gateshead Storm Chris helped them reach the 2012 North East cup final and despite tearing his pectoral away from the bone he picked up the man of the match award against Jarrow Vikings.

== International ==
Chris finished 2009 with some positive news, signing a 2-year contract extension and receiving a call up to the Malta national rugby league team for a friendly international against touring English side Bamber Bridge RLFC.

Chris made his début for the Malta national rugby league team on 3 October 2009 in the 36–28 win over Bamber Bridge RLFC and was named vice-captain by caretaker coach Anthony Micallef. Chris also scored his first try for the country and added the extras from the resulting kick.

On 4 June 2010 Parker helped Malta come from 10–0 down midway through the first half to defeat Norway, 30–20 to take the Rugby League European Federation Bowl at the Victor Tedesco Stadium, Hamrun.

In 2011 Chris Parker was named the 2009–2010 Ray Morris Medal Winner by the Malta Rugby League (MRL), commonly known as Maltese Player of the Year. He also took over the reins of the Maltese National Team Captain from the retiring Daniel Grima, the first game under his captaincy saw the Maltese team put in a strong performance in their first game of the European Shield against Germany on 24 July 2011 but unfortunately the German side were too strong for the 15-man Maltese Squad taking the game 36–12, Parker scoring one of the Maltese two tries.

In their second game of the Euro Shield Malta faced Norway running away with a 64–24 win missing out on the Euro shield by a points difference of 1.

Parker captained Malta to a 24–12 victory against Denmark in 2012, the game being the first of a two-game series between the countries. In the second leg in Copenhagen on 29 September 2012, Malta took the series with an emphatic 12 – 74 win with Captain Parker amongst the try scorers on the day.

In 2012 Parker has also stepped up his efforts to help the Malta by setting up the Maltese Exiles, a side made up of Maltese Heritage rugby league players who play in fixtures around the UK in an effort to raise awareness of the MRL, the exiles were 34 – 12 winners in their first-ever game against Leeds Akkies, Parker scoring a try in the fixture. Parker then took the Maltese exiles to the Un-official Exiles world Cup held in Leeds (8/09/12) where the Exiles finished 3rd in the Competition losing out to the top spot in their group in a thrilling match against Fiji UK.

== Coaching career ==
In 2012 Parker finished his first season as Head Coach of the Gateshead Storm Under-13s with the Under-13s North East Cup winners and the North East 9s winners to his name and was awarded the 2012 Under-13s Coach of the year at the North East Junior Presentation awards at the Stadium of Light, Sunderland.

Parker was appointed head coach of Newcastle University Rugby League for the students 2012–2013 season and got off to a winning start in his first game beating Liverpool John Moores University 76–0. The Newcastle University side continued on a 10-game unbeaten run seeing off Leeds Mets 2nds 4–19, Edge Hill 18–0, Liverpool 12–20, Sheffield 62–18, Liverpool John Moores 16–23, Leeds Mets 2nds 42–14, Edge Hill 12–22 and a 42–12 victory over Liverpool to seal the league title. The Newcastle side also dispatched Nottingham Trent Uni 16–32 in the quarter-finals of the cup but Leeds Met Uni were too strong in the semi-finals, Newcastle losing 60–0. A tough Stan Calvert game saw Newcastle lose to Northumbria University 32–16.

During the 2013 pre-season Gateshead Storm Head Coach Gareth Barron relocated to London and Parker was promoted to the Head Coach position of the Gateshead Storm open age side. He would combine this role with that of the U14s to ensure their continued progress.

In his first season in charge of Gateshead Storm Open Age, Parker guided his side to the 2013 North East Premier League Leaders' Shield, were crowned 2013 North East Cup Winners with a 24–16 win over Jarrow Vikings before sealing the treble with a 33–16 win again over Jarrow Vikings in the North East Premier Grand Final at Peterlee Pumas, Helford Rd.

The Gateshead Storm season continued with a 24–0 bye against Northampton Demons Academy, a 62–12 victory over Telford Raiders and a heartbreaking 28–22 defeat by South West London Chargers in the Harry Jepson Trophy final at Butts Park arena, Coventry.

2013 also saw Chris having major input into the U14s talent pathway. He coached the South of Tyne to an impressive victory over the North of Tyne. 17 South of Tyne players were selected to join the Tyne & Wear squad to face Durham. Parker also joined the Tyne & Wear squad to help prepare them for the game against Durham—the game ended 4 tries apiece.

Parker took control of his first Maltese side when the Malta XIII played 1 Mercian Regt (The British Army) on 8 July 2013 at Melita FC, Pembroke, Malta. Parker took the role of Captain/Coach taking the team's pre-game sessions and making the final call on the team's selection. The Maltese side won a tough game 26–24 with Chris scoring two tries, helping his side win the 2013 DoveCare+Men Summer Trophy.

Chris has also been coaching rugby union side Blaydon at U13s (2011–2012) and U14s (2012–2013).
