= League 1 Shield =

- Sport: Rugby league
- Instituted: 2016
- Number of teams: 8
- Country: England; Wales (RFL)
- Holders: Hunslet (1st title)
- Broadcast partner: Sky Sports

The League 1 Shield was a competition that is played at the end of the regular rugby league season in the League 1 Super 8s of the League 1 (rugby league).

== Structure ==
The teams that do not qualify for the Super 8s in League 1 play each other once more, if there is an odd number of teams then each team takes a bye round. The top two teams play each other in the Shield Final at the home of the team finishing first.

== League 1 Shield finals ==
Year	Winner	Score	Runner up	Venue	Attendance
2016	Newcastle Thunder	31–26	North Wales Crusaders	Kingston Park	
2017	Hunslet	32–12	London Skolars	South Leeds Stadium	

=== Summary of winners ===
	Club	Wins	Last win	Runners-up	Last final
=1	Newcastle Thunder	1	2016	0	2016
=1	Hunslet	1	2017	0	2017
=3	London Skolars	0	N/A	1	2017
=3	North Wales Crusaders	0	N/A	1	2016

== See also ==
- Rugby League Super 8s
- League 1 Super 8s
- Championship Shield
