= Matty Foster =

English rugby league footballer

Personal information
- Full name: Matthew Foster
- Born: 25 June 2001 (age 25) St Helens, Merseyside, England
- Height: 6 ft 1 in (1.85 m)
- Weight: 14 st 9 lb (93 kg)

Playing information
- Position: Second-row
Club
Years	Team	Pld	T	G	FG	P
2020–23	St Helens	1	0	0	0	0
2021(loan)	→ Leigh Centurions	6	0	0	0	0
2024 (loan)	→Swinton Lions	8	1	0	0	4
2024 (loan)	→North Wales Crusaders	1	0	0	0	0
2024–25	Salford Red Devils	19	2	0	0	8
2024 (loan)	→Swinton Lions	2	0	0	0	0
2025	Oldham RLFC	2	0	0	0	0
2026–	York Knights	2	0	0	0	0
2026 (loan)	→Newcastle Thunder	11	1	0	0	4
	Total	52	4	0	0	16
- Source: As of 22 October 2025

Matty Foster (born 25 June 2001) is an English professional rugby league footballer who plays as a second-row forward for York Knights in the Super League.

He spent time on loan from the Saints at the Leigh Centurions in the Super League.

== Background ==
He signed from amateur team Blackbrook ARLFC. He has progressed through the St Helens scholarship programme and represented England U16 as well as the Lancashire Academy, debuting off of the bench against Salford Red Devils at the back end of the 2020 season.

== Playing career ==
=== St Helens ===
Foster made his first team début for St Helens, coming off the substitute interchange bench against the Salford Red Devils on 26 Oct 2020. Due to end-of-season fixture congestion caused by the COVID-19 pandemic, Saints fielded a very young side, resting the majority of first team players, in preparation of their derby match against the Wigan Warriors just four days later. On 21 September 2023, it was announced that Foster would be departing St Helens at the end of the 2023 Super League season.

=== Leigh Centurions (loan) ===
On 17 March 2021, it was reported that he joined the Leigh Centurions in the Super League on the RFL's new two-week-loan system. This loan was discontinued after Foster suffered a dual jaw break within the squad's first round game against the Wigan Warriors.

=== Leigh Centurions (2nd loan) ===
On 4 August 2021 it was reported that he had signed for the Leigh club in the Super League on loan.

=== Swinton Lions (Dual Registration) ===
During the backend of the 2023 Betfred Super League season, it was reported that he had joined Swinton Lions on a dual-registration basis that had been agreed with current club at the time, St Helens RLFC. Scoring 2 tries across 6 games in the Championship.

=== Salford Red Devils ===
On 1 Nov 2023 it was reported that he will join Salford Red Devils for 2024

=== Swinton Lions (loan) ===
On 26 Apr 2024 it was reported that he had signed for Swinton Lions in the RFL Championship on loan

=== Oldham RLFC ===
On 22 August 2025 it was reported that he had signed for Oldham RLFC in the RFL Championship

=== York Knights ===
On 22 October 2025 it was reported that he had signed for York Knights in the Super League
