= De La Salle Va'a =

American Samoan rugby league footballer (born 2005)

Personal information
- Full name: De La Salle Va'a
- Born: 16 August 2005 (age 21) Pago Pago, American Samoa
- Height: 200 cm (6 ft 7 in)
- Weight: 121 kg (19 st 1 lb)

Playing information
- Position: Prop
Club
Years	Team	Pld	T	G	FG	P
2024–	Sydney Roosters	3	0	0	0	0
- Source: As of 4 September 2026
- Relatives: Xavier Va'a (brother)

De La Salle Va'a (born 16 August 2005) is a professional rugby league footballer who plays as a prop for the Sydney Roosters in the National Rugby League.

== Career ==
Va'a grew up in the Darling Downs in Queensland, near Toowoomba. Playing for the Highfields Eagles, Va'a was signed by the Brisbane Broncos for their junior pathway systems before signing with the Sydney Roosters.

Va'a was named in the 2024 U19's Queensland Origin team. Starting in the front row.

In round 27 of the 2024 NRL season, Va'a made his first grade debut against arch-rivals South Sydney at Accor Stadium coming off the interchange bench.
