= Paul Vaughan (rugby league) =

Australia & Italy international rugby league footballer (born 1991)

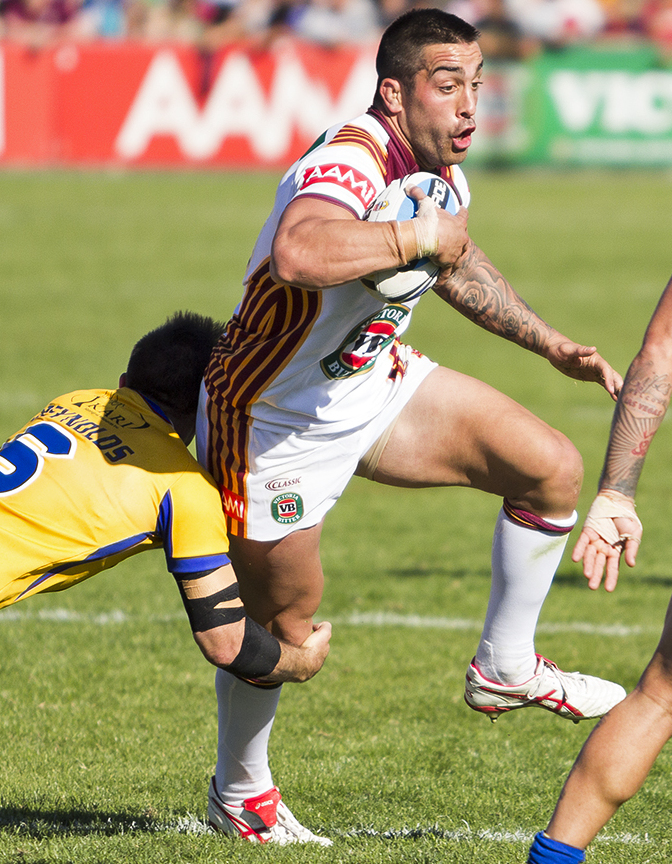

Personal information
- Full name: Paul Vaughan
- Born: 23 April 1991 (age 35) Canberra, ACT, Australia
- Height: 6 ft 4 in (1.93 m)
- Weight: 17 st 5 lb (110 kg)

Playing information
- Position: Prop
Club
Years	Team	Pld	T	G	FG	P
2013–16	Canberra Raiders	85	16	0	0	64
2017–21	St. George Illawarra	96	13	0	0	52
2022	Canterbury Bulldogs	24	1	0	0	4
2023–25	Warrington Wolves	78	9	0	0	36
2026	York Knights	28	8	0	1	33
	Total	311	47	0	1	189
Representative
Years	Team	Pld	T	G	FG	P
2013–17	Italy	6	1	0	0	4
2014–17	NSW Country	4	0	0	0	0
2017	NRL All Stars	1	0	0	0	0
2017	Prime Minister's XIII	1	0	0	0	0
2018–19	New South Wales	6	1	0	0	4
2019	Australia	2	1	0	0	4
- Source: As of 22 November 2026

Paul Vaughan (born 23 April 1991) is a former professional rugby league footballer who played as a prop forward. He has played for both Italy and Australia at international level. He most Recently signed with the Junee Diesels

He previously played for the Canterbury-Bankstown Bulldogs, St. George Illawarra Dragons and Canberra Raiders in the National Rugby League. He also played for Warrington Wolves and York Knights in the English Super League, and at representative level for NSW Country, NRL All Stars and New South Wales in the State of Origin series.

== Background ==
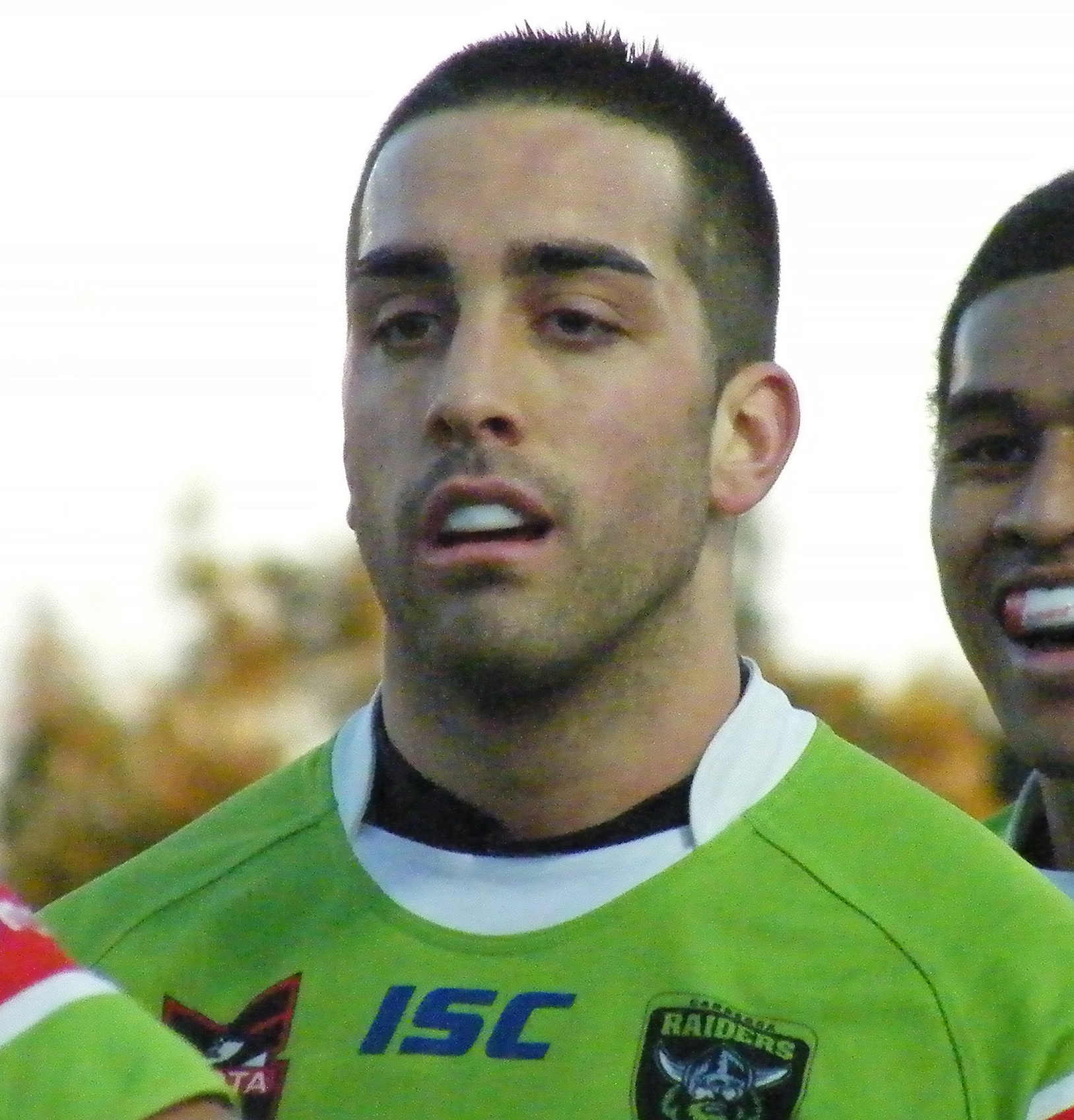
Vaughan playing for the Raiders in 2011

Vaughan was born in Canberra, Australian Capital Territory, and is of Italian descent through his maternal grandmother.

He played his junior rugby league for the Gungahlin Bulls before being signed by the Canberra Raiders, with whom he played in the National Youth Competition in 2010 and 2011. In 2012, Vaughan graduated to the Raiders' NSW Cup team, the Mount Pritchard Mounties, winning the Mounties' Player's Player award and being named on the interchange bench in the 2012 NSW Cup Team of the Year.

== Playing career ==
=== 2013 ===
On 18 April, Vaughan re-signed with the Raiders on a 2-year contract to the end of the 2015 season. In Round 7 of the 2013 NRL season, Vaughan made his NRL debut for the Canberra Raiders off the interchange bench against the North Queensland Cowboys in the Raiders 30–12 loss at 1300SMILES Stadium. In Round 14 against the Penrith Panthers, Vaughan scored his first NRL career try in the Raiders 24–12 win at Canberra Stadium. Vaughan finished the 2013 NRL season being named as the Raiders Rookie of the Year, playing in 18 matches and scoring a try in his debut year in the NRL. In October, Vaughan was named in the Italy 24-man squad for the 2013 World Cup, playing in all of their three matches.

=== 2014 ===
In Round 7 against the Melbourne Storm, Vaughan scored a solo effort try in the 79th minute to win the match for the Raiders 24–22 at Canberra Stadium. Vaughan earned selection in the NSW Country team in the City vs Country Origin match off the interchange, scoring a try in the 26-all draw in Dubbo. Vaughan finished the 2014 NRL season with him playing in 23 matches and scoring 7 tries for the Raiders. On 10 September, Vaughan re-signed with the Raiders until the end of the 2017 season.

=== 2015 ===
On 3 May, Vaughan played for New South Wales Country against New South Wales City in the 2015 City vs Country Origin match, playing off the interchange bench in Country's 34–22 win at Wagga Wagga. In Round 20 against the Penrith Panthers, he scored his first career double in the Raiders' 34–24 win at Penrith Stadium. He finished the 2015 season having played in all of the Raiders' 24 matches and scoring 4 tries. On 8 September, he was named in the 2015 Prime Minister's XIII squad but later pulled out due to injury.

=== 2016 ===
On 30 January, Vaughan was named in the Raiders' 2016 NRL Auckland Nines squad. On 8 May, for the third year in a row, Vaughan played for New South Wales Country against New South Wales City, where he played off the interchange bench in the 44–30 loss in Tamworth. After Round 18, Vaughan was dropped to the Raiders NSW Cup team the Mount Pritchard Mounties after Coach Ricky Stuart opted to select the newly arrived prop Junior Paulo from the Parramatta Eels, rising youngster Joseph Tapine and late bloomer rookie Clay Priest to be part of the forwards rotation. But after Clay Priest suffered a season ending ankle injury, Vaughan beat out overlooked veteran forwards Shaun Fensom and Jeff Lima to fill in the vacant spot on the interchange bench for the finals. Vaughan finished the 2016 NRL season playing 20 matches and scoring 4 tries for the Canberra Raiders. On 15 October, it was announced that Vaughan signed a 3-year contract with the St. George Illawarra Dragons worth $1.75m, starting in 2017.

=== 2017 ===
On 10 February, Vaughan played for the World All Stars against the Indigenous All Stars in the 2017 All Stars match, playing off the interchange bench in the 34–8 loss at Hunter Stadium. In Round 1 of the 2017 NRL season, Vaughan made his club debut for the St George Illawarra Dragons against the Penrith Panthers, starting at prop in the 42–10 win at Jubilee Oval. In his next match, in Round 2 against the Parramatta Eels, Vaughan scored his first club try for the Dragons in the 34–16 loss at WIN Stadium. On 13 September, Vaughan was named in the 2017 Prime Minister's XIII squad.

=== 2018 ===
In 2018, Vaughan was named in The NSW Blues squad for The 2018 State of Origin series. Vaughan also had the honour of being the 1000th player to pull on a Blues jersey. On 5 June, Vaughan told the Sydney Morning Herald that "The best thing I did in my career was to leave Canberra and go to St George Illawarra." Vaughan went on to play in all 3 games of the 2018 State of Origin series as The Blues won the shield 2–1.

=== 2019 ===
After a good start to the 2019 NRL season, Vaughan was selected to play for New South Wales in the 2019 State of Origin series. Vaughan played in all 3 games and scored a try in the deciding match which was played at ANZ Stadium. The Blues won 26-20 courtesy of a last minute try to James Tedesco. New South Wales would go on to win the series 2-1 and retain the shield for the first time since 2005.

Vaughan made a total of 23 appearances for St George Illawarra in the 2019 season as they endured one of their worst ever seasons, finishing 15th on the table above the last placed Gold Coast. St George Illawarra had gone into the season as one of the clubs expected to make the finals and challenge for the premiership.

On 30 September, Vaughan was named as prop in the Prime Minister's XIII side. On 7 October, Vaughan was named in the Australian side for the upcoming Oceania Cup fixtures.

=== 2020 ===
On 6 August, Vaughan was stood down by the club and fined $10,000 after he was caught breaking the NRL's strict bubble restrictions by visiting an Illawarra cafe.

Vaughan played 15 games for St. George Illawarra in the 2020 NRL season as the club finished 12th. Following the conclusion of the season, Vaughan was not selected for the 2020 State of Origin series.

=== 2021 ===
On 4 July, Vaughan was placed under investigation by the NRL after it was alleged he hosted a house party along with eleven of his teammates which went against the league's COVID-19 biosecurity protocols, as well as a breach of the NSW stay-at-home orders. The following day, Vaughan was suspended for eight matches and fined $50,000 over the incident. It was also alleged that Vaughan withheld information from the NRL and NSW Police. On 6 July, the St. George Illawarra board approved the termination of Vaughan's contract effective immediately. The illegal house party was one of three behavioural strikes against Vaughan. On 28 July, Vaughan signed a contract with the Canterbury-Bankstown Bulldogs for the 2022 season.

=== 2022 ===
In round 1 of the 2022 NRL season, Vaughan made his club debut for Canterbury in their 6–4 victory against the North Queensland Cowboys at Queensland Country Bank Stadium. Following the resignation of coach Trent Barrett, Vaughan was criticised by journalists for attacking the media despite explicit instructions from general manager Phil Gould not to speak to the media. On 22 June, Vaughan signed a two-year deal to join English side Warrington starting in 2023. In round 20, Vaughan played his 200th first grade game in Canterbury's victory over Newcastle.

=== 2023 ===
Vaughan made his club debut for Warrington in round 1 of the 2023 Super League season as the side defeated Leeds 42–10. In round 24, Vaughan scored two tries for Warrington in their 66–12 victory over Castleford.

During Warrington's loss to St Helens in round 26, Vaughan was placed on report for trying to move an injured Sione Mata'utia during the clubs 18–6 defeat. Vaughan was later suspended for four matches over the incident which ended his season. Vaughan was also fined £500.

=== 2024 ===
On 8 June 2024, Vaughan played in Warrington's 2024 Challenge Cup final loss against Wigan. Vaughan played 24 games for Warrington in the 2024 Super League season as the club reached the semi-final before losing to Hull Kingston Rovers.

=== 2025 ===
On 7 June, Vaughan played in Warrington's 8-6 Challenge Cup final loss against Hull Kingston Rovers. On 25 July, Vaughan signed a contract to join RFL Championship side York RLFC. Vaughan played 24 games for Warrington in the 2025 Super League season as they missed the playoffs finishing 8th on the table.

=== 2026 ===
In his last game before retirement on 10 September he kicked a drop goal in the 78th minute in the 35-16 win over Bradford.

== Statistics ==
Year	Team	Games	Tries	Goals	DG	Pts
2013	Canberra Raiders	18	1			4
2014	Canberra Raiders	23	7			28
2015	Canberra Raiders	24	4			16
2016	Canberra Raiders	20	4			16
2017	St. George Illawarra Dragons	23	8			32
2018	St. George Illawarra Dragons	19	2			8
2019	St. George Illawarra Dragons	23	2			8
2020	St. George Illawarra Dragons	15				
2021	St. George Illawarra Dragons	16	1			4
2022	Canterbury-Bankstown Bulldogs	24	1			4
2023	Warrington Wolves	27	6			24
2024	Warrington Wolves	24				
2025	Warrington Wolves	9				
2026	York Knights	25	7		1	29
	Totals	308	46		1	185
