= Jack Smith (rugby league) =

English professional rugby league footballer

Personal information
- Full name: Jack Smith
- Born: 29 April 2005 (age 21) Pontefract, West Yorkshire, England
- Height: 6 ft 3 in (1.91 m)
- Weight: 15 st 2 lb (96 kg)

Playing information
- Position: Wing, Centre
Club
Years	Team	Pld	T	G	FG	P
2024–25	Leeds Rhinos	0	0	0	0	0
2024(loan)	→ Halifax Panthers	3	0	0	0	0
2024(loan)	→ Bradford Bulls	2	0	0	0	0
2025(loan)	→ London Broncos	14	5	49	0	118
2026–	York Knights	0	0	0	0	0
2026(loan)	→ Newcastle Thunder	12	6	20	0	64
	Total	31	11	69	0	182
- Source: As of 19 July 2026

Jack Smith (born 29 April 2005) is an English professional rugby league footballer who plays as a winger or centre for Newcastle Thunder in the RFL Championship, on loan from the York Knights in the Betfred Super League.

He has spent time on loan from the Leeds Rhinos at the Halifax Panthers and the Bradford Bulls in the RFL Championship. Smith has also played on loan from Leeds at the London Broncos in the Championship, winning the RFL Championship Young Player of the Year in 2025.

== Background ==
Smith was born in Pontefract, West Yorkshire, England

He grew up playing rugby union as a youth, and also played rugby league for Featherstone Lions as a junior.

Smith played for the England Academy side.

== Career ==
Smith made his professional debut in March 2024 on loan at the Halifax Panthers against the Bradford Bulls in the Championship.

He spent time in 2024 on loan at Bradford in the Championship.

In May 2025 Smith was sent on loan to the London Broncos in the Championship. He won the RFL Championship Young Player of the Year in 2025.

Smith joined the York Knights after his Leeds contract expired at the end of the 2025 season.
