= Justin Sangaré =

French international rugby league footballer (born 1998)

Justin Sangare
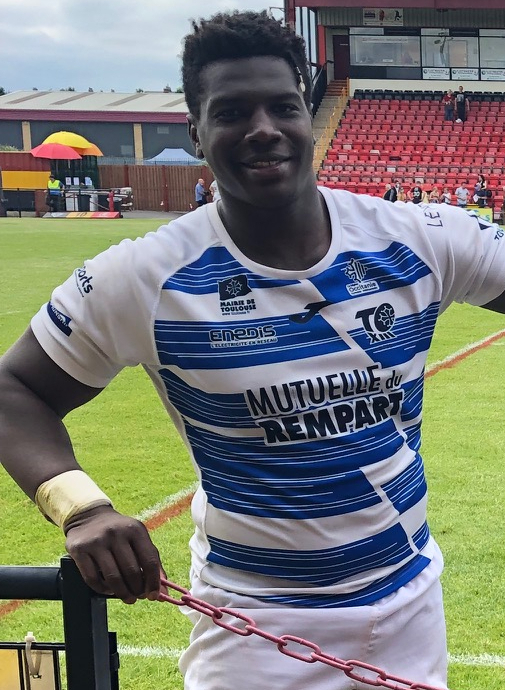

Personal information
- Full name: Justin Sangaré
- Born: 7 March 1998 (age 28) Mali
- Height: 6 ft 4 in (1.93 m)
- Weight: 18 st 2 lb (115 kg)

Playing information
- Position: Prop
Club
Years	Team	Pld	T	G	FG	P
2015–20	Toulouse Olympique Broncos	37	10	0	0	40
2016–22	Toulouse Olympique	77	16	0	0	64
2023–24	Leeds Rhinos	42	2	0	0	8
2025	Salford Red Devils	24	4	0	0	16
2026	York Knights	13	0	0	0	0
2026	→ Newcastle Thunder (loan)	4	2	0	0	8
2026–	Pia XIII Baroudeur	0	0	0	0	0
	Total	197	34	0	0	136
Representative
Years	Team	Pld	T	G	FG	P
2019–	France 9s	4	1	0	0	0
2018–	France	9	3	0	0	4
- Source: As of 13 February 2026

Justin Sangaré (born 7 March 1998) is a France international rugby league footballer who plays as a prop for Pia XIII Baroudeur in the Super XIII.

He is a product of the Toulouse academy system.

== Background ==
Sangaré was born in Mali but grew up in the Bagatelle district of Toulouse and discovered rugby league aged 10 when the Toulouse Olympique community programme visited his school.

== Club career ==
=== Toulouse Olympique Broncos ===
Sangaré graduated from Toulouse's "Centre de Formation" and made his debut for the Toulouse reserve side on 19 September 2015 coming off the bench in the 16–24 defeat to win at home to Saint-Estève XIII Catalan.

=== Toulouse Olympique ===
Aged just 18 years old, Sangaré made his debut for the first team on 15 May 2016, coming off the bench in the 46–24 win at Hunslet in Kingstone Press League 1.

On 15 September 2017, Toulouse announced that Sangaré had extended his contract until the end of the 2018 season.

Toulouse announced on 3 September 2020 that Sangaré had signed a new contract with Toulouse for the 2021 RFL Championship. He subsequently played in 14 of the 15 matches in 2021, including the Million Pound Game which saw Toulouse earn promotion to Super League for 2022.

On 28 October 2021, Toulouse announced that Sangaré had signed a new contract that would keep him at the club until the end of the 2022 season. Sangaré revealed that he chose to remain with Toulouse despite offers from other Super League clubs. On 19 July 2022, he signed a two-year deal to join Leeds starting in 2023.

=== Leeds Rhinos ===
In round 1 of the 2023 Super League season, Sangaré made his club debut for Leeds in their 42–10 loss against Warrington. Sangare played 17 matches for Leeds in the 2023 Super League season as the club finished 8th on the table and missed the playoffs. He played 23 games for Leeds in the 2024 Super League which saw the club finish 8th on the table.

=== Salford Red Devils ===
On 12 November 2024 it was reported that he had signed for Salford on a two-year deal. Sangare played 24 matches for Salford in the 2025 Super League season as the club endured one of their worst ever seasons on and off the field finishing bottom of the table due to severe financial problems and limited player numbers.

=== York Knights ===
On 14 October 2025 it was reported that he had signed for York Knights.

=== Pia XIII Baroudeur ===
On 12 November 2026 it was reported that he had joined Pia XIII Baroudeur for the 2026-2027 Super XIII season.

== Club statistics ==
Source Updated 12 November 2024

Year	Club	Competition	Appearances	Tries	Goals	Drop goals	Points
2015-16	Toulouse Olympique Broncos	Elite One Championship	12	2	0	0	8
2016-17	Toulouse Olympique Broncos	Elite One Championship	6	2	0	0	8
2017-18	Toulouse Olympique Broncos	Elite One Championship	7	3	0	0	12
2018-19	Toulouse Olympique Broncos	Elite One Championship	8	3	0	0	12
2019-20	Toulouse Olympique Broncos	Elite One Championship	4	0	0	0	0
Club total			37	10	0	0	40
2016	Toulouse Olympique	Kingstone Press League 1	4	0	0	0	0
2017	Toulouse Olympique	Championship	4	0	0	0	0
2017	Toulouse Olympique	Challenge Cup	1	0	0	0	0
2018	Toulouse Olympique	Championship	21	5	0	0	20
2019	Toulouse Olympique	Championship	10	1	0	0	4
2020	Toulouse Olympique	Championship	3	1	0	0	4
2021	Toulouse Olympique	Championship	14	10	0	0	40
2022	Toulouse Olympique	Championship	23	0	0	0	0
Club total			57	17	0	0	68
2023	Leeds Rhinos	Super League	18	1	0	0	4
2024	Leeds Rhinos	Super League	24	1	0	0	4
Club total			42	2	0	0	8
2025	Salford Red Devils	Super League	24	4	0	0	16
Club total			24	4	0	0	16
2026	York Knights	Super League	0	0	0	0	0
Club total			0	0	0	0	0
Career total			126	29	0	0	116

== International career ==
=== France U18s ===
Sangaré started on the bench in the 52–20 defeat to England Academy at Warrington on 27 May 2016.

=== France 9s ===
The French squad that took part in the 2019 Rugby League World Cup 9s in Sydney, Australia in October 2019 included Sangaré. He missed out in the first match, a 12–8 defeat to Lebanon, but played in the 23–6 victory over Wales and in the final game, a 38–4 loss to England.

=== France ===
Serbia lost 54–2 to France in a friendly in Belgrade on 7 October 2018 which saw Sangaré make his debut for the full French national side. The side was made up of players mostly drawn from the French domestic competition. Sangaré was not selected for the test match against England or the three World Cup qualifiers later that autumn where France selected sides mostly made up of Catalans Dragons and Toulouse Olympique players from the English competitions.

Sangaré was part of the expanded French squad after the 2019 Rugby League World Cup 9s that played two games Down Under. He made his debut for the senior side on 25 October 2019 coming off the bench in the 62–4 defeat to the Junior Kangaroos. He once again came off the bench in the final match of the tour against the Western Rams five days later, which France won 22–20.

On 23 October 2021 Sangaré scored a try in the 10–30 test match defeat to England in Perpignan.

== International statistics ==
Year	Team	Competition	Appearances	Tries	Goals	Drop goals	Points
2018	France	International match	1	0	0	0	0
2019	France 9s	Rugby League World Cup 9s	2	0	0	0	0
2019	France	Australian Tour	2	0	0	0	0
2021	France	Test match	1	1	0	0	4
International career total			6	1	0	0	4
