= Connor Robinson =

English rugby league footballer

Personal information
- Born: 23 October 1994 (age 31) England

Playing information
- Height: 5 ft 11 in (1.80 m)
- Weight: 14 st 2 lb (90 kg)
- Position: Scrum-half
Club
Years	Team	Pld	T	G	FG	P
2014–15	Hull Kingston Rovers	2	0	0	0	0
2015(loan)	→Coventry Bears	3	0	8	0	16
2015–17	Halifax	25	10	6	0	52
2017–20	York City Knights	42	15	239	7	545
2021	Halifax Panthers	14	0	47	1	95
2022–26	Doncaster	24	5	103	0	226
	Total	110	30	403	8	934

Connor Robinson (born 23 October 1994) is a former rugby league footballer who last played as a scrum-half for Doncaster in the RFL Championship.

He previously played for Hull Kingston Rovers, Halifax Panthers and York City Knights.

== Playing career ==
=== Hull Kingston Rovers ===
He plays as a scrum-half and was part of Hull Kingston Rovers' first team. A former West Hull junior, he had been part of Hull Kingston Rovers' youth set-up since the age of 12. Shortly before the 2014 season, he signed a 2-year professional contract.

=== Halifax RLFC ===
In July 2015, he was released by Hull Kingston Rovers and joined Halifax.

=== York City Knights ===
He was named League 1 player of the season during York's promotion campaign and helped them make the Championship playoffs during their first year back in the division. In 2018, Robinson set club records at York for the most goals (186) and most points (420) scored in a season.

=== Halifax Panthers ===
On 7 September 2020 it was reported that Robinson would re-join Halifax for the 2021 season

=== Doncaster R.L.F.C. ===
On 8 Nov 2021 it was reported that he had signed for Doncaster R.L.F.C. in the RFL League 1

On 10 October 2026 it was reported that he had chosen to retire
