= Dave Woods (rugby league coach) =

Australian rugby league coach

Personal information
- Full name: David Woods
- Born: 10 March 1970 (age 56) Australia

Playing information
- Position: Centre
Club
| Years | Team | Pld | T | G | FG | P |
|---|---|---|---|---|---|---|
| 1998–01 | Penrith Panthers | 63 | 17 | 0 | 0 | 68 |
| 2002 | Halifax RLFC | 24 | 10 | 0 | 0 | 40 |
| | Total | 87 | 27 | 0 | 0 | 108 |

Coaching information
Club
| Years | Team | Gms | W | D | L | W% |
| 2005 | Castleford Tigers |
| 2006 | Gateshead Thunder |
| 2010–11 | York City Knights |
| 2013–15 | Whitehaven RLFC |
| | Total | 0 | 0 | 0 | 0 |
- As of 22 June 2025

Dave Woods (born 10 March 1951) is an Australian rugby league coach and former player.

Woods has been involved in rugby since the age of three. He began as a ball boy for the Enfield Federals, his father's team, and the following year joined the under-6s rugby league. He later played junior rugby league for St George, serving the Jersey Flegg and under-23s as a captain. He also appeared as a reserve player for the Penrith Panthers and the Parramatta Eels, respectively from 1989-1997 and 1998-2001.

He began coaching while still in junior rugby league. He took two teams to premierships in Parramatta, the Greystanes Devils to the under-17s C-grade and Merrylands to the top tier. After that, he became a development coach for the Penrith Panthers, which led eventually to his coaching the Castleford Tigers. In the 2005 season, the team achieved the National League One title and, under his direction, was promoted to Super League. Woods was then released by the Tigers because they wanted a better known coach to guide them in their Super League career.

He later coached Gateshead Thunder and in his second season took them from bottom of the table to champions of Championship 1. That year, he was awarded the National League Two Coach of the Year award. However, immediately thereafter, he was released by Gateshead Thunder. For several years, Woods left full-time rugby as he pursued a constructive dismissal case against the Gateshead Thunder that became complicated when bankruptcy affected the club. During that time, he served as the Great Britain Community Lions Under-18s coach for the Rugby Football League.

In April 2010, Woods joined the York City Knights, first as a part-time director of rugby and then, two months later, as coach. His contract was terminated in September 2011.

In 2013, Woods took over as coach for the Whitehaven team.
