= King Vuniyayawa =

Fiji international rugby league footballer

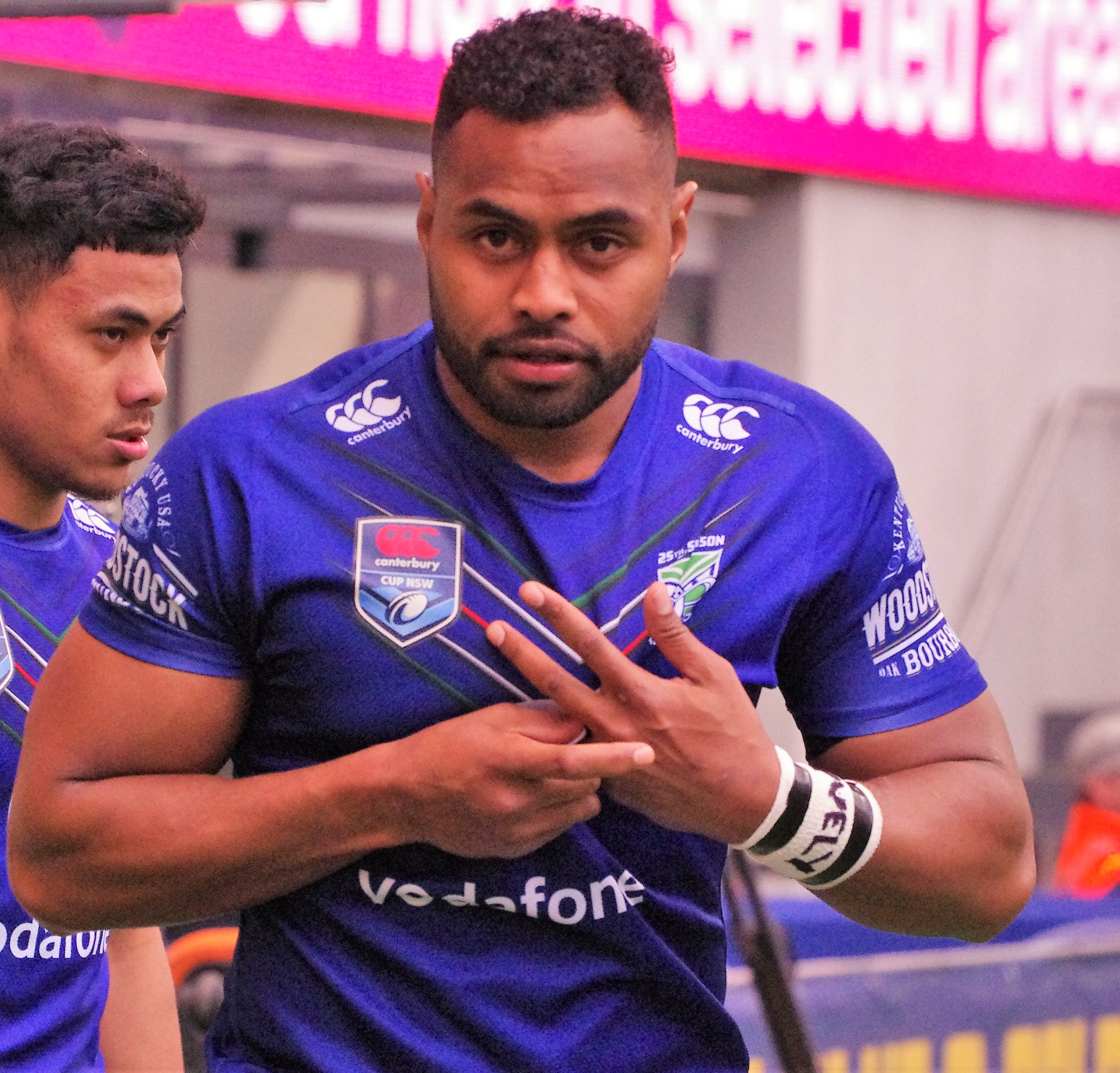

Personal information
- Born: 13 March 1995 (age 31) Lautoka, Viti Levu, Fiji
- Height: 6 ft 2 in (1.88 m)
- Weight: 17 st 0 lb (108 kg)

Playing information
- Position: Prop, Second-row
Club
Years	Team	Pld	T	G	FG	P
2020	New Zealand Warriors	5	0	0	0	0
2021	Leeds Rhinos	16	1	0	0	4
2022–24	Salford Red Devils	58	4	0	0	16
2024(loan)	→Hull FC	2	0	0	0	0
2025	Featherstone Rovers	26	6	0	0	24
2026	Newcastle Thunder	18	7	0	0	28
2026(loan)	→ York Knights	8	3	0	0	12
2027–	Oldham RLFC	0	0	0	0	0
	Total	133	21	0	0	84
Representative
Years	Team	Pld	T	G	FG	P
2018–	Fiji	9	0	0	0	0
- Source: As of 29 October 2026

King Vuniyayawa (born 13 March 1995) is a Fijian professional rugby league footballer who plays as a prop or second-row for Oldham RLFC in the RFL Championship.

He has previously played for the New Zealand Warriors in the NRL and represented Fiji at international level. He has also previously played for the Leeds Rhinos, Salford Red Devils and Hull FC in the Super League, and Featherstone Rovers in the Championship.

== Background ==
Vuniyayawa was born in Lautoka, Fiji.

== Career ==
=== New Zealand Warriors ===
Vuniyayawa made his NRL debut in Round 1, 2020, in the Warriors' 20–0 loss to the Newcastle Knights.

=== Leeds Rhinos ===
On 16 January 2021, it was reported that he had signed for Leeds in the Super League. On 9 October, Vuniyayawa signed a two-year contract to join Salford.

=== Salford Red Devils ===
On 9 October 2021 Salford announced the signing of Fijian international King Vuniyayawa on a two-year contract. Following Salford's 30–14 victory over Castleford in May 2022, Vuniyayawa was ruled out of the remainder of the 2022 season with a pectoral injury. Vuniyayawa made a remarkable recovery and made returned to first team action in the resounding Round 26 victory away at Castleford. In the 2023 Super League season, he played 25 matches for Salford as the club finished 7th on the table and missed the playoffs.

=== Hull F.C. (loan) ===
On 18 July 2024 it was reported that he had signed for Hull F.C. in the Super League on loan for the remainder of the 2024 season.

=== Featherstone Rovers ===
On 6 December 2024 it was reported that he had signed for Featherstone Rovers in the RFL Championship.

=== Newcastle Thunder ===
On 30 December 2025 it was reported that he had signed for Newcastle Thunder in the RFL Championship for the 2026 season.

=== Oldham RLFC ===
On 29 October 2026 it was reported that he had signed for Oldham RLFC in the RFL Championship

=== International ===
In 2018, Vuniyayawa was selected to represent Fiji vs Papua New Guinea.
