= Xavier Va'a =

American Samoan rugby league footballer (born 2003)

Personal information
- Full name: Xavier Va'a
- Born: 17 November 2003 (age 22) Pago Pago, American Samoa
- Height: 6 ft 5 in (1.95 m)
- Weight: 17 st 13 lb (114 kg)

Playing information
- Position: Prop
Club
Years	Team	Pld	T	G	FG	P
2025	Sydney Roosters	1	1	0	0	4
2026–	York Knights	30	4	0	0	16
	Total	31	5	0	0	20
- As of 19 September 2026
- Relatives: De La Salle Va'a (brother)

Xavier Va'a (born 17 November 2003) is a Samoan professional rugby league footballer who plays as a prop for the York Knights in the Super League.

He previously played for the Sydney Roosters in the NRL.

== Career ==
=== Sydney Roosters ===
In round 12 of the 2025 NRL season, Va'a made his first grade debut against the Cronulla Sharks, scoring a try.

On 10 December 2025, the Roosters announced that Va'a was released from the remainder of his contract to pursue opportunities elsewhere.

=== York Knights ===
On 9 January 2026 it was reported that he had signed for York Knights in the Super League on a 2-year deal.
