= Mark Applegarth =

English rugby league footballer & coach

Personal information
- Born: 10 December 1984 (age 41) Wakefield, West Yorkshire, England
- Height: 6 ft 2 in (1.88 m)
- Weight: 17 st 6 lb (111 kg)

Playing information
- Position: Prop, Second-row, Loose forward
Club
Years	Team	Pld	T	G	FG	P
2004–08	Wakefield Trinity Wildcats	47	3	0	0	12
2008–10	York City Knights	72	22	0	0	88
2010–12	Central Queensland Comets	18	2	0	0	8
2012–14	Batley Bulldogs	58	9	0	0	36
2014–16	York City Knights	48	5	0	0	20
	Total	243	41	0	0	164

Coaching information
Club
Years	Team	Gms	W	D	L	W%
2022–23	Wakefield Trinity	29	4	0	25	14
2024–	York Knights	80	51	0	29	64
	Total	109	55	0	54	50
- Source: As of 3 November 2026

Mark Applegarth (born 10 December 1984), also known by the nickname of "Mash", is an English professional rugby league coach who is the head coach of the York Knights in the Super League, and a former professional rugby league footballer who played during the 2000s and 2010s. He played at club level for the Wakefield Trinity Wildcats, the York City Knights (two spells), the Central Queensland Comets and the Batley Bulldogs, as a prop, second-row, or loose forward.

He took over as head-coach of York in the RFL Championship, following Andrew Henderson's move to become Head of Rugby operations and development.

== Background ==
Applegarth was born in Newton Hill, Wakefield, West Yorkshire, England. As of 2020, he lives in the Wakefield area with his wife Jessica, they were married at Sandburn Hall, Flaxton, York during 2018.

== Playing career ==
He represented the Great Britain Schoolboys against the Australian Schoolboys during 2002. Applegarth came through the ranks at Wakefield Trinity Wildcats and made his début as an 18-year-old. Upon leaving Wakefield Trinity Wildcats due to injuries, he joined the York City Knights. He was released from his contract with the York City Knights during June 2010 to pursue a career in Australia. After a brief stint with the Temora Dragons in New South Wales, Applegarth played for the Central Queensland Comets based in Rockhampton in the Queensland Cup competition. During 2012, Applegarth signed for the Batley Bulldogs under his former Wakefield Trinity Wildcats coach John Kear. During 2014, after another serious knee-injury, Applegarth re-signed for the York City Knights to become their player/assistant coach. He retired from playing during 2016 and as of 2019, he was the Head of Youth at Wakefield Trinity.

== Coaching career ==
=== Wakefield Trinity ===
Applegarth was appointed head coach following the sacking of Willie Poching at the end of the 2022 Super League season. In round 15 of the 2023 Super League season, Applegarth earned his first win as Wakefield Trinity head coach defeating Leeds 24-14. Wakefield had lost their opening 14 matches of the campaign. At the conclusion of the Super League XXVIII season Wakefield Trinity finished bottom of the table and were relegated to the RFL Championship which ended their 24-year stay in the top flight. Applegarth was subsequently relieved of his duties and replaced with Daryl Powell.

=== York Knights ===
On 5 June 2024, it was reported that he would take over the head coach role from Andrew Henderson at York Knights in the RFL Championship. On 7 June 2025, Applegarth guided York to their 1895 Cup final victory over Featherstone. In the 2025 RFL season, Applegarth guided York to first place on the table and eventual grand final where they would lose narrowly to Toulouse Olympique.
