= York Knights =

English professional rugby league club

Club information
- Full name: York Rugby League Football Club
- Nicknames: Knights (Mens team); Valkyrie (Women's team)
- Colours: Amber & Black
- Founded: 2002; 24 years ago
- Website: Official website

Current details
- Ground: York Community Stadium (8,500)
- CEO: Neil Gulliver
- Chairman: David Dickson
- Coach: Mark Applegarth
- Captain: Liam Harris
- Competition: Super League
- 2026 season: 10th
- Current season

Uniforms
Home colours

The York Knights are the professional rugby league team of York RLFC, based in York, England. The club play their home games at York Community Stadium and competes in the Super League, the top tier of British rugby league.

The club, which was founded as the York City Knights, is a phoenix club established after the original York club folded in 2002. The Knights played in blue and white until 2017 when they reverted to the city's traditional home colours of amber and black. The club was renamed as York RLFC in 2022 with the men's team continuing to be known as the Knights and the women's team becoming the Valkyrie.

== History ==
=== 1868–2002: Predecessor ===
The first club was formed in 1868 as "York Football Club", playing both codes, association and rugby football in different fields as the club did not have their own venue.

When Northern rugby teams broke away from the Rugby Football Union to form their own Northern Union in 1895, York initially stayed with the RFU but in 1901 they joined the new entity.

The original York Wasps folded in March 2002. After a last-ditch take-over deal to save the Wasps collapsed, the RFL accepted the club's resignation on 26 March 2002.

=== 2002–2003: New club ===
A supporters' trust working party was formed on 27 March and applied to the RFL to continue the 2002 Northern Ford Premiership fixtures. After hearing it would be impossible to meet requirements to return that season, on 5 May fans backed a proposal for a new club to apply for admittance to the league for 2003.

The RFL accepted York's bid to play in the newly formed National League Two on condition that they had £75,000 in the bank by 31 August. The new club decided that the best way to raise cash was through a fans' membership scheme. Former Great Britain star Paul Broadbent was revealed as player-coach. With the total standing at £70,000, John Smith's brewery came in with £5,000 as the club hit the target just hours before the deadline.

The full name of the new club was revealed to be York City Knights RLFC, following a competition in The Evening Press. Club bosses, in the following month of October, also let the public design a club logo which was based on the New South Wales Rugby League Team's logo, while they picked new colours of blue and white – a move away from York RL's traditional amber and black. John Guildford, majority shareholder of York building firm Guildford Construction, was revealed to be the majority shareholder. They played at Huntington Stadium, where the previous incarnation of York RL played.

=== 2003–2006: National League 2 and promotion ===
The Knights played their first game at home against Hull Kingston Rovers in the National League Cup on 19 January with a bumper crowd of 3,105. In their first year, the Knights finished fourth with 11 wins, a draw and 6 losses. They made the National League Two play-offs but lost 50–30 to Barrow Raiders. Paul Broadbent resigned as coach at the end of the season.

Richard Agar was appointed head coach for the following year. They made it all the way to the Challenge Cup Quarter-final, losing 50–12 to Huddersfield Giants. York also made the semi-finals of the Championship Cup, losing 32–0 to Hull Kingston Rovers. After finishing second in the league, and three points behind Barrow, the Knights entered the playoffs. They lost 37–20 in the qualifying semi final to Halifax and then beat Workington Town 70–10. Mark Cain broke the record for most tries in a match and the score was the highest points tally since the Knights were born. They were narrowly beaten in the play-off final by Halifax 34–30 at the Halton Stadium in Widnes. Agar left York to join Hull F.C. as an assistant coach.

York appointed Mick Cook as their new head coach in 2005 as part of a partnership with Super League club Leeds Rhinos. Cook's side made it to the 5th round of the Challenge Cup losing 62–0 to St. Helens 62–0 at Knowsley Road. At the end of the league season they were champions by three points and were promoted automatically to National League One for the first time. They were now only one tier away from Super League. They had the highest crowd average for National League One teams, of 1,986. York's game against Hunslet on 25 May 2005 drew a crowd of 3,224 which at the time was a record for National League One.

York kicked off their first season in rugby league's second tier, losing 25–18 away at Widnes Vikings. They lost their first seven games before finally beating Oldham 62–0 and then again 15 days later, 54–10. Despite a good late run of form including wins over Whitehaven, Doncaster and Rochdale Hornets, York were relegated back to National League Two at the end of the season culminating in a 60–16 defeat to Leigh Centurions at Hilton Park. York finished second bottom, above Oldham with five wins and thirteen defeats, three points below Doncaster. They did however, win the Fairfax Cup, after beating Batley 14–10 in their first appearance in the York International 9s.

=== 2007–2010: Relegation to Championship 1 ===
2007 was a poor season for the City Knights, finishing sixth in the league with ten wins and twelve losses. There was also a record defeat for York City Knights in the Challenge Cup 5th round losing 74–4 to Huddersfield Giants, Chris Spurr getting York's sole try. Mick Cook quit as coach at the end of the season to run his business and Paul March was appointed player-coach on a one-year rolling contract in September 2007.

He took York to sixth place again with eleven wins and ten losses. Even though there were three promotion places available (two automatic, one via the playoffs), the Knights failed to capitalise and lost in the playoffs to Rochdale Hornets 12–28. Gateshead Thunder and Barrow Raiders went up automatically, Doncaster went up via the playoffs.

2009 saw the Knights start positively and looked like they could challenge for the title. After a Sky Sports game at home to Oldham, March was sacked in due to disciplinary matters and then director of rugby James Ratcliffe took over. The Knights finished third but eventually lost in the playoffs in the semi-final to Oldham 44–14.

Chris Thorman arrived at the club in 2010 as assistant to Ratcliffe but saw himself become acting head coach while Ratcliffe was suspended. The Knights claimed one of their biggest scalps when they defeated Leigh Centurions, who were in the division above, 13–12 in the Northern Rail Cup group stages thanks to a late Thorman drop goal. Ratcliffe returned for the away game at Doncaster and Dave Woods arrived at York as director of rugby in April 2010. Five games later, Ratcliffe was sacked after a 30–36 defeat to Swinton Lions and Woods was named as head coach. York were fifth in Championship 1 at the time after seven wins and six losses in the league. Woods' first game was a 60–12 victory over Gateshead and finished third in the table and thus qualified for the play-offs. After losing to Oldham, York then beat Blackpool Panthers in the semi-final where they'd face Oldham in the final. On 26 September 2010, the Knights won the Co-operative Championship 1 play-off Grand Final to earn promotion to the Championship. They beat Oldham 25–6 at the Halliwell Jones Stadium in Warrington. The Knights had finished the regular season 13 points behind their final opponents.

=== 2011–2013: Promotion to the Championship ===
York finished third-bottom of the Championship in 2011, but bottom club Toulouse were exempt from relegation so, with two going down, the Knights faced demotion along with Dewsbury Rams – until the RFL decided not to admit Crusaders into this division following their withdrawal from Super League, thus earning York a reprieve. Dewsbury were also saved after Barrow Raiders received a points deduction meaning the Knights finished fourth bottom. Just six days later Dave Woods was sacked by the club.

In 2012, there were no relegation spots available and thus, York decided against strengthening their squad. Chris Thorman was appointed head coach and former Leeds Rhinos full back Jordan Tansey signed for the club on a one-year deal. York won one league game all season beating Swinton Lions 26–22. Thus York finished bottom of the pile. Chris Thorman announced he would be joining the coaching staff at Huddersfield Giants at the end of the season. He was to be replaced by Gary Thornton who was appointed head coach in 2012 .

2013 started off well for the City Knights and looked to be challenging for the playoffs. A run of eleven straight losses at the end of the season and failure to win away in the league since June 2011 saw them relegated back to Rugby Leagues basement tier. They made the 5th round of the Challenge Cup losing 92–8 away at Catalans Dragons. The Knights finished the season seven points from safety with six wins and twenty losses.

=== 2014–2016: League 1 ===
York City Knights played in Championship 1, as they finished bottom of the Championship in the 2013 season. Famous wins in 2014 came against Hunslet whom they beat three time, 28–26 away in March, 40–0 at home in May and won the league at the South Leeds Stadium after the comeback was sealed thanks to a Colton Roche Try meaning the Knights won 20–18. They also beat Oldham 54–14 at home. York City Knights topped Championship 1 but lost in the end of season play-offs to Hunslet Hawks, thus failing to secure promotion back the Championship.

Gary Thornton was sacked and was replaced by James Ford for the start of the 2015 season where the Knights are now homeless after John Guildford failed to sign up for the Community Stadium deal. John Guildford has stepped down as Chairman and appointed four directors; Stephen Knowles, Dave Baldwin, Neil Jennings and Gary Dickenson, the latter has since stepped down.

On 18 June 2015, York City Knights reserves were kicked out of the reserve league and banned from entering the 2016 competition. The first team still remained homeless.

At the end of the 2015 season, York City Knights finished Fourth in League 1 and qualified for the playoffs. They lost out to Swinton Lions 17–16 on the Golden Point They were also knocked out in the League 1 Cup second round by Newcastle Thunder. They reached the fifth round of the Challenge Cup, losing to St. Helens 46–6.

=== 2016–2018: Closure threat ===
Club logo used for 2018–2022 seasons

In July 2016 it was announced the club would not be able to play their first game of the Super 8s against Doncaster at Bootham Crescent due to York City FC playing on the Saturday, meaning that the Knights would have to play midweek due to there having to be 24 hours between games at the stadium. Due to the disputes between the owner and the council, the club directors announced that they would be winding up the club as soon as all necessary legal steps had been taken. The following day a joint statement from the club, the RFL and the city council was issued stating "We continue to work to resolve this situation and are hopeful that ways can be found for James Ford and his players to be able to fulfil the remainder of their fixtures this season." On 25 July the club owner, John Guildford, announced that he was in negotiation with local businessman, Gary Dickenson, and that the sale would be of a club "virtually debt-free" enabling the Knights to continue to run. however on 23 August Dickenson discontinued the negotiations. Following the collapse of the sale to Dickenson, Guildford put the club up for sale to any interested buyer.

The RFL issued a deadline of 1 December 2016 for ownership issues to be resolved and late on 1 December the club issued a statement that ownership of the Knights had passed entirely to a consortium headed by Jon Flatman. The following day the RFL confirmed that the team would be re-instated into League 1 for the 2017 season. In January 2017, it was revealed that the club will play all home fixtures in 2017 and 2018 at York City's Bootham Crescent, and that the team colours had changed to amber and black.

In April 2018, the club broke two 24 year old world records for rugby league when they beat West Wales Raiders 144–0, beating the previous highest score of 142–4 (Huddersfield Giants v Blackpool Gladiators, November 1994) and the previous record margin of 138 points (Barrow Raiders v Nottingham City, 138–0, also November 1994). At the end of the 2018 season, York were promoted back to the RFL Championship.

=== 2018–2025: Back in the Championship ===
York finished the 2021 RFL Championship season in 9th place. The following year, the club reached the playoffs by finishing sixth. However, a month before the playoffs began on the 21 August 2022, York suffered a club record 100–4 loss against Leigh. In the playoffs, York upset Halifax in the first week to set up another match against Leigh. On this occasion, York were defeated 70–10 which ended their season. In the following two years, York would qualify for the playoffs. In 2025, the club enjoyed one of their best seasons finishing top of the table at the end of the regular season and also winning the 1895 Cup. York would play against Toulouse Olympique in the Championship grand final where they would lose 10–8.

=== 2025–present: Promotion to Super League ===
Following the 2025 season, in which York finished as League Leaders and runners-up, York were promoted to the Super League for 2026 as a result of the league's expansion to 14 teams, representing a return to top-flight rugby league in the city since the original club's relegation from Division One at the end of the 1985-86 season. York started their tenure in the Super League with the best possible start, defeating defending champions Hull Kingston Rovers 19-18 in the opening match of the 2026 Super League season. York would finish their first season back in the top flight with a credible 10th placed finish on the table.

== Stadiums ==
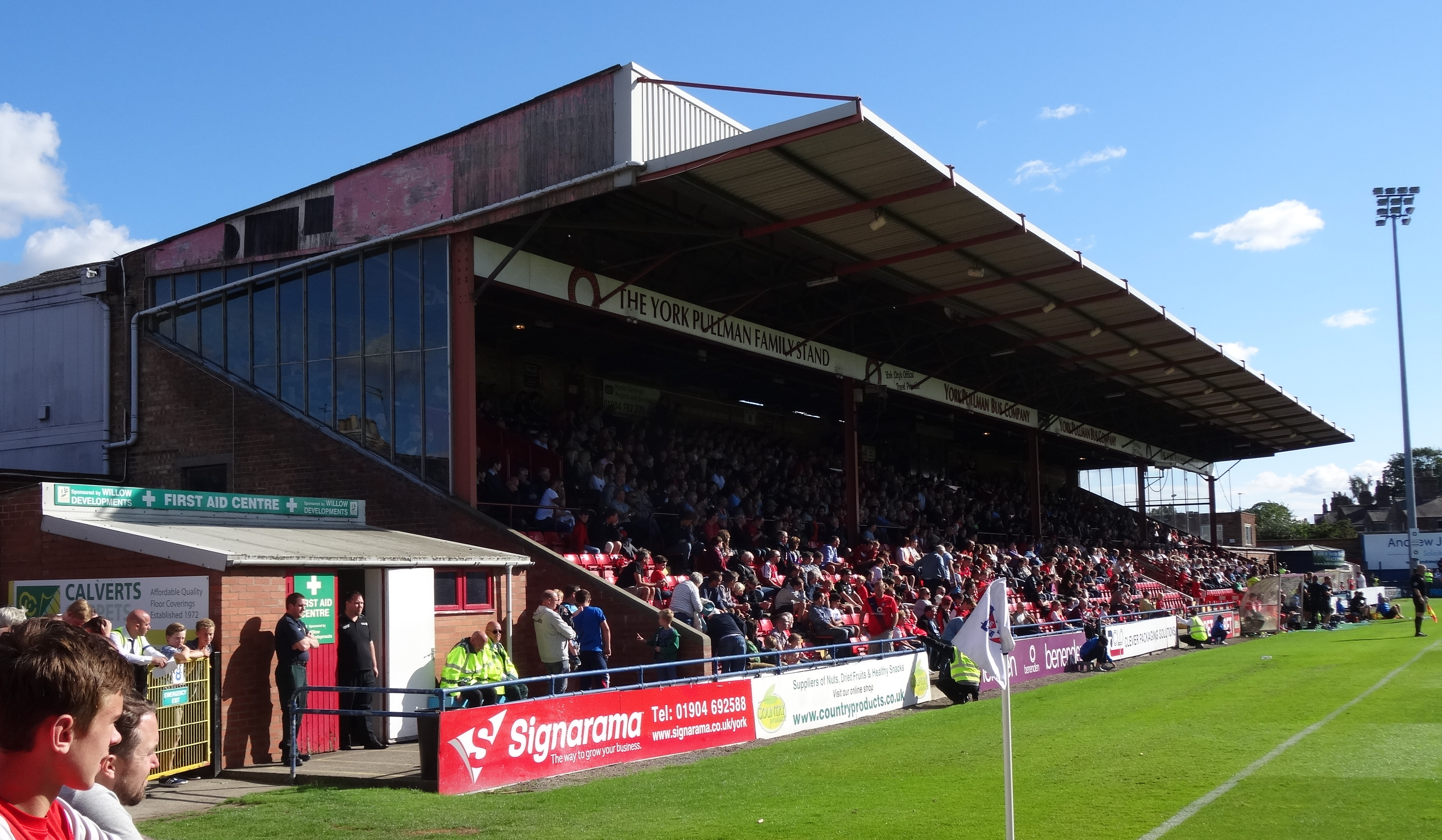
The Main Stand at Bootham Crescent, York, photographed in 2015

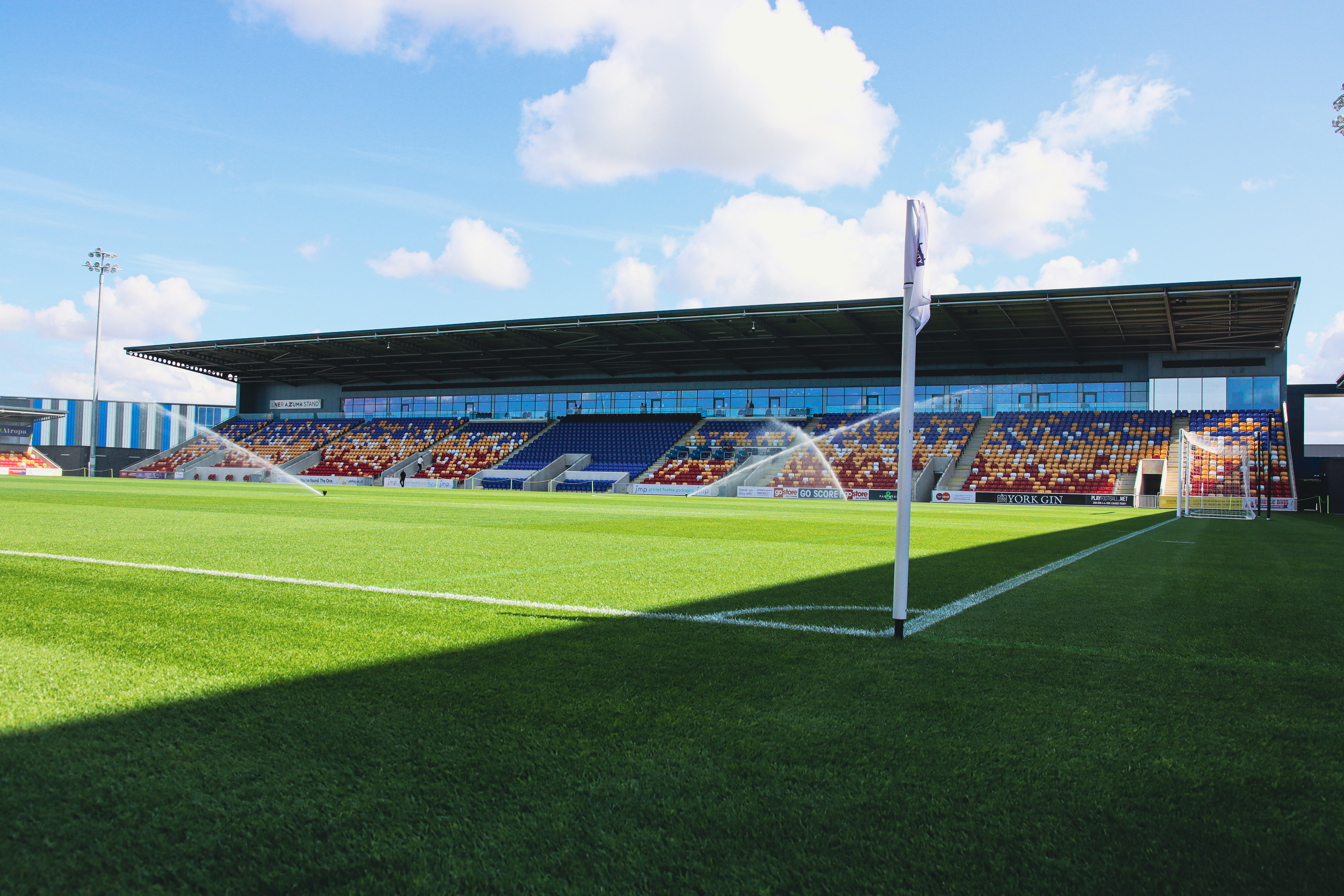
The Main Stand at York Community Stadium, York, photographed in 2021

=== 2002–2014: Huntington Stadium ===
The Knights played their first game at Huntington Stadium on 19 January 2003. It had previously been the home ground of York Wasps until they were dissolved in 2002. The capacity was 3,428 and the stadium also had an athletics track. The Knights left the stadium at the end of the 2014 season and it was later demolished to allow for the building of York Community Stadium which is on the same site.

=== 2015: Elmpark Way ===
The Knights were left homeless and were forced to ground share with local amateur team Heworth A.R.L.F.C. for a season until they could find a permanent home.

=== 2016–2020: Bootham Crescent ===
In 2016 the Knights began ground sharing with York City F.C. at Bootham Crescent. The Crescent had a capacity of 8,256 with 3,409 seats and the remaining capacity was standing.

=== 2021: York Community Stadium ===
In March 2021 the knights played their first match at York Community Stadium in a pre-season game against Hull F.C. The stadium has a capacity of 8,500.

== Club identity and colours ==
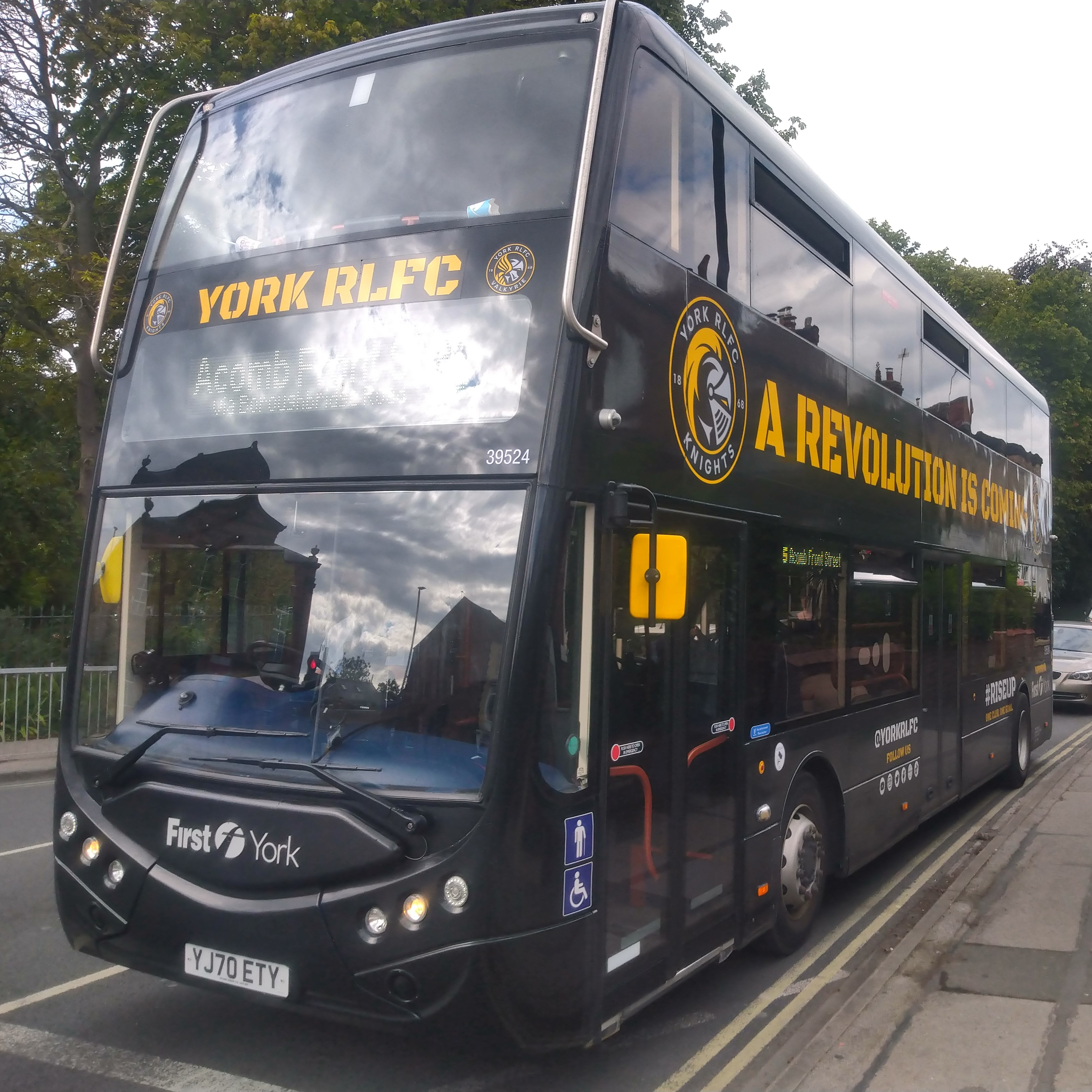
First York bus in 2023 promoting York RLFC's re-branding

In 2002, following the demise of York Wasps, the newly established York club sought a new beginning with a new identity that left behind the difficulties associated with the previous club. The team adopted a blue and white kit rather than the traditional amber and black colours and competitions were held in the local newspaper, The Evening Press, first to choose a new name, York City Knights RLFC, and then to design a club logo. A club mascot, Norris the Knight, was introduced making his first public appearance in December 2003 and taking part in the Mascot Grand National in 2006.

In the 2016 season, with the Knights sharing a ground with York City F.C., they launched an away kit in blue and red; the colours of the football club and proposed colour scheme of the future community stadium. However, the club changed ownership in December 2016 and the following month it was announced that both the home and away kits would change to the amber and black historically associated with rugby league in York, and which had previously been used for heritage and away kits. The club badge initially remained blue and white, but this too would change colour the following year when the 2018 kit launched featuring a new logo that commemorated the 150th anniversary of the original York club.

On 14 October 2022, the club announced that it had changed its name to York RLFC as an umbrella term with the men's team continued to be known as the Knights. The women's team became the Valkyrie. Both teams introduced new logos as part of the rebrand.

=== Kit sponsors and manufacturers ===
| Years | Kit manufacturer | Main shirt sponsor |
|---|---|---|
| 2003 | Kukri | Guildford Construction |
| 2004–2005 | Kukri | Phoenix Software |
| 2006–2009 | Kooga | Phoenix Software |
| 2010–2011 | Samuri | Guilford Construction (GCL) |
| 2012 | Centurion | Assurant |
| 2013 | Centurion | Pryers |
| 2014 | FI-TA | Pryers |
| 2015–2016 | FI-TA | BMW Cooper York |
| 2017 | FI-TA | DCL |
| 2018 | Errea | MLS Group |
| 2019 | VX3 | York St John University |
| 2020–21 | SUPRO | York St John University |
| 2022 | Ellgren | York St John University |
| 2023 | Oxen | Fortus |
| 2024 | Oxen | Nutrein |
| 2025 | O'Neills | Land Rover |
| 2026 | DXG | Redmove |

== 2027 squad ==
Where a player has played internationally for more than one country, the nations are indicated with the most recently represented first. A slash (/) indicates an uncapped player of dual nationality.

2027 York Knights squad
| First team squad | | | Coaching staff |
|---|---|---|---|
| (England) Jon Bennison – WG, FB; (Scotland) Kieran Buchanan – CE, WG, FB; (New Zealand) Mitch Clark – SR, PR; (Australia) Jesse Dee – SR, CE; (England) Andy Djeukessi – WG; (England) Thomas Doyle – HK; (England) Matty English – PR, LF; (England) Brad Fash – LF, PR; (England) Oli Field – SR, CE; (England) Zach Fishwick – PR; (England) Matty Foster – SR; (Australia) Scott Galeano – WG, CE; (England) Zak Hardaker – SR, CE | (England) Liam Harris (c) – SH, SO (gk); (England) Myles Harrison – CE, FB, WG; (Australia) Cody Hunter – SO, SH; (England) Tom Inman – HK, SO; (Jamaica) Ben Jones-Bishop – WG, FB; (England) Max Jowitt – FB, SH; (England) Joe Law – CE, WG; (Australia) Blake Lawrie – PR, LF; (Australia) Jack Martin – PR; (Samoa) Toa Mata'afa – FB, WG, CE; (Australia) Cameron McInnes – LF, HK | (England) Paul McShane – HK, SH; (Ireland) Ronan Michael – PR; (Serbia) David Nofoaluma – WG, FB, CE; (England) Harvey Reynolds – SR; (England) Will Roberts – SH, SO; (England) Jack Smith – WG (gk); (England) Jordan Thompson – SR, LF, CE; (Samoa) Xavier Va'a – PR; (New Zealand) Nikau Williams – SH, SO, CE; (England) Sam Wood – CE | Head coach: (England) Mark Applegarth; Assistant coaches: (England) Gareth Ellis; (England) Graham Steadman; (England) Chris Thorman; Legend: (c) Captain(s); (vc) Vice-captain(s); (red card) = suspended; = injured; (gk) = Goal kicker; Updated: 15 August 2026; Source(s): Knights Squad |

== 2027 transfers ==
=== Gains ===
| Player | From | Contract | Date |
|---|---|---|---|
| (England) Matty English | Huddersfield Giants | 2 years | 29 July 2026 |
| (Australia) Cameron McInnes | Cronulla-Sutherland Sharks | 3 years | 31 August 2026 |
| (England) Max Jowitt | Wakefield Trinity | 2 years | 5 September 2026 |
| (England) Zak Hardaker | Hull FC | 2 years | 8 September 2026 |
| (England) Brad Fash | Hull FC | 2 years | 9 November 2026 |
| (Australia) Blake Lawrie | St George-Illawarra Dragons | 2 years | 11 September 2026 |
| (Australia) Cody Hunter | Newcastle Thunder | 2 years | 16 September 2026 |
| (Serbia) David Nofoaluma | Newcastle Thunder | 2 years | 18 September 2026 |
| (England) Tom Inman | Newcastle Thunder | 2 years | 23 September 2026 |
| (England) Myles Harrison | Newcastle Thunder | 2 years | 3 November 2026 |
| (England) Joe Law | Newcastle Thunder | 2 years | 3 November 2026 |
| (England) Harvey Reynolds | Newcastle Thunder | 2 years | 3 November 2026 |
| (England) Andy Djeukessi | Newcastle Thunder | 1 year | 5 November 2026 |
| (England) Zach Fishwick | Hull KR | 1 year | 14 October 2026 |
| (Ireland) Ronan Michael | Northern Pride | 1 year | 11 November 2026 |

=== Losses ===
| Player | From | Contract | Date |
|---|---|---|---|
| (England) Danny Richardson | Widnes Vikings | 1.5 years | 15 June 2026 |
| (Wales) Denive Balmforth | Hull FC | End of loan spell - Return to parent club | 12 September 2026 |
| (England) Will Dagger | | | 12 September 2026 |
| (Tonga) Ata Hingano | Oldham | 3 years | 23 October 2026 |
| (England) Kieran Hudson | | | 6 November 2026 |
| (Australia) Ryan Jackson | | | 6 November 2026 |
| (Australia) Jordan Lipp | | | 6 November 2026 |
| (Australia) John Sagaga | | | 6 November 2026 |
| (France) Justin Sangaré | Pia XIII Baroudeur | 1 year | 12 November 2026 |

=== Retired ===
| Player | Date |
|---|---|
| (Australia) Paul Vaughan | 9 September 2026 |

== Staff ==
=== Coaching register ===
- Paul Broadbent 2003
- Richard Agar 2004
- Mick Cook 2005–07
- Paul March 2008–09
- James Ratcliffe 2009–10
- Dave Woods 2010–11
- Chris Thorman 2012
- Gary Thornton 2013–14
- James Ford 2015–22
- Andrew Henderson 2023–24
- Mark Applegarth 2024–

== Seasons ==
=== League history ===
- 2003–2005: League 1
- 2006: Championship
- 2007–2010: League 1
- 2011–2013: Championship
- 2014–2018: League 1
- 2019–2025: Championship
- 2026–present: Super League

=== List of seasons ===
| Season | League | | | | | | | | | Play-offs | Challenge Cup | Other competitions | | Name | Tries | Name | Points |
| Season | Division | P | W | D | L | F | A | Pts | Pos | Play-offs | Challenge Cup | Other competitions | | Top try scorer | | Top point scorer | |
|---|---|---|---|---|---|---|---|---|---|---|---|---|---|---|---|---|---|
| 2003 | National League Two | 18 | 11 | 1 | 6 | 576 | 381 | 23 | 4th | Lost in Elimination Playoffs | R4 | Championship Cup | GS | | | | |
| 2004 | National League Two | 18 | 13 | 0 | 5 | 630 | 308 | 26 | 2nd | Unknown | QF | Championship Cup | SF | | | | |
| 2005 | National League Two | 18 | 15 | 0 | 3 | 683 | 356 | 30 | 1st | Promoted as Champions | R5 | Championship Cup | GS | | | | |
| 2006 | National League One | 18 | 5 | 0 | 13 | 476 | 553 | 10 | 9th | Did not qualify | R5 | Championship Cup | QF | | | | |
| 2007 | National League Two | 22 | 10 | 0 | 12 | 488 | 470 | 36 | 6th | Unknown | R4 | Championship Cup | L16 | | | | |
| 2008 | National League Two | 22 | 11 | 1 | 10 | 740 | 540 | 42 | 6th | Unknown | R3 | Championship Cup | GS | | | | |
| 2009 | Championship 1 | 18 | 12 | 0 | 6 | 589 | 360 | 40 | 3rd | Lost in Preliminary Final | R4 | Championship Cup | QF | | | | |
| 2010 | Championship 1 | 20 | 12 | 0 | 8 | 617 | 524 | 39 | 3rd | Won in Final – Promoted | R4 | Championship Cup | QF | | | | |
| 2011 | Championship | 20 | 5 | 1 | 14 | 416 | 788 | 19 | 8th | Did not qualify | R4 | Championship Cup | GS | | | | |
| 2012 | Championship | 18 | 1 | 0 | 17 | 272 | 645 | 7 | 10th | Did not qualify | R4 | Championship Cup | GS | | | | |
| 2013 | Championship | 26 | 6 | 0 | 20 | 493 | 727 | 26 | 14th | Did not qualify | R5 | Championship Cup | L16 | | | | |
| 2014 | Championship 1 | 20 | 17 | 3 | 0 | 738 | 367 | 54 | 1st | Lost in Preliminary Final | R4 | | | | | | |
| 2015 | Championship 1 | 22 | 16 | 6 | 0 | 816 | 382 | 32 | 4th | Lost in Semi-final | R6 | League 1 Cup | QF | | | | |
| 2016 | League 1 | 21 | 12 | 1 | 8 | 618 | 461 | 25 | 5th | Lost in Semi-final | R5 | League 1 Cup | RU | | | | |
| 2017 | League 1 | 22 | 12 | 1 | 9 | 641 | 460 | 25 | 4th | Lost in Semi-final | R5 | League 1 Cup | L16 | | | | |
| 2018 | League 1 | 26 | 24 | 0 | 2 | 1130 | 308 | 48 | 1st | Promoted as Champions | R5 | | | | | | |
| 2019 | Championship | 27 | 19 | 1 | 7 | 612 | 529 | 39 | 3rd | Lost in Semi-final | R5 | 1895 Cup | QF | | | | |
| 2020 | Championship (Note: The 2020 Championship was abandoned due to the COVID-19 pandemic in the United Kingdom. Statistics shown are those at time of abandonment and are not official.) | 4 | 0 | 0 | 4 | 26 | 102 | 0 | 13th | None Played | R6 | | | | | | |
| 2021 | Championship | 20 | 9 | 0 | 11 | 502 | 477 | 18 | 9th | Did not qualify | R6 (Note: Officially round 3 due to the competitions temporary restructure in 2021.) | 1895 Cup | RU | | | | |
| 2022 | Championship | 27 | 18 | 0 | 9 | 677 | 596 | 36 | 6th | Lost in Semi-final | R5 | | | | | | |
| 2023 | Championship | 27 | 15 | 0 | 12 | 557 | 557 | 30 | 6th | Lost in Elimination Playoffs | QF | 1895 Cup | SF | | | | |
| 2024 | Championship | 26 | 15 | 0 | 11 | 655 | 473 | 30 | 4th | Lost in Semi-final | R4 | 1895 Cup | SF | | | | |
| 2025 | Championship | 24 | 20 | 0 | 4 | 764 | 299 | 40 | 1st | Lost in Grand Final | R3 | 1895 Cup | W | | | | |
| 2026 | Super League | 27 | 9 | 0 | 18 | 545 | 791 | 18 | 10th | Did not qualify | QF | | | | | | |

== Honours ==
League

- Championship
  Runners up (1): 2025
  League Leaders (1): 2025
- League One:
  Winners (2): 2005, 2018
  Runners up (1): 2004
  League Leaders (2): 2014, 2018
  - League One Play Off Final:
  Winners (1): 2010

Cups

- RFL 1895 Cup:
  Winners (1): 2025
  Runners up (1): 2021
- League 1 Cup:
  Runners up (1): 2016

== Records ==
=== Individual scoring records ===
- Goals: 21: Connor Robinson at West Wales, 11 August 2018
- Tries: 7: Kieren Moss v. West Wales 29 April 2018
- Points: 56: Chris Thorman v. Northumbria University, 6 March 2011 – 4 tries and 20 goals
- Try scoring streak 10: Jack Lee in 2014
- Goals in a season: 186: Connor Robinson in 2018
- Points in a season: 420: Connor Robinson in 2018

=== Team records ===
- Biggest win:
  144–0 v. West Wales (at Bootham Crescent, 29 April 2018)
- Biggest defeat:
  100–4 v. Leigh (at Leigh Sports Village, 21 August 2022)

=== Attendance records ===
- Bootham Crescent: 4,281 v. Bradford (18 February 2018)
- York Community Stadium: 8,000+ v. Hull Kingston Rovers (12 February 2026) (Note: Attendance of 8,000 given in Super League report - "Ecstatic York fans in a crowd of 8000 at an electric LNER Community Stadium" and "their biggest-ever crowd at LNER Community Stadium", sources also reported match as a sell-out - capacity is 8,500)

== See also ==
- New York Knights
