= Liam Harris =

English rugby league footballer

Personal information
- Full name: Liam Harris
- Born: 20 April 1997 (age 29) Kingston upon Hull, East Riding of Yorkshire, England
- Height: 6 ft 1 in (1.85 m)
- Weight: 13 st 5 lb (85 kg)

Playing information
- Position: Scrum-half, Stand-off
Club
Years	Team	Pld	T	G	FG	P
2017	Hull Kingston Rovers	1	0	0	0	0
2017(loan)	→ York City Knights	18	14	12	0	80
2018	Doncaster	14	10	36	0	112
2018–20	Hull F.C.	11	3	0	0	12
2019(loan)	→ York City Knights	18	5	1	1	23
2021	Halifax Panthers	21	8	29	1	91
2022–	York Knights	107	55	201	9	631
	Total	190	95	279	11	949
- Source: As of 6 September 2026

Liam Harris (born 20 April 1997) is a professional rugby league footballer who plays as a scrum-half for the York Knights in the Super League.

He played for Hull Kingston Rovers in the Championship, and on loan from Hull KR at the York City Knights in Kingstone Press League 1. He played for Doncaster in League 1 and Hull FC in the Super League.

== Background ==
Harris was born in Kingston upon Hull, East Riding of Yorkshire, England.

== Playing career ==
In 2018 he made his Super League début for Hull F.C. against Hull Kingston Rovers.

=== Halifax ===
On 17 November 2020, it was announced that Harris would join Halifax for 2021.

=== York City ===
On 12 October 2021, it was reported that he had signed for York City in the RFL Championship

On 7 June 2025, Harris scored all five points for York, including the match-winning golden point drop goal, in their 5–4 win over Featherstone Rovers in the final of the 2025 RFL 1895 Cup.
