= Newcastle Thunder =

English professional rugby league club

Club information
- Full name: Newcastle Thunder Rugby League Football Club
- Nickname: Thunder
- Short name: Newcastle
- Colours: Purple and yellow
- Founded: 2000 (as Gateshead Thunder)
- Website: thunderrugby.co.uk

Current details
- Ground: Crow Trees Ground, Swalwell (2,000 (400 seats))
- CEO: Richie Metcalf
- Chairman: Keith Christie
- Coach: Craig Huby
- Captain: tbc
- Competition: Championship
- 2026 season: 2nd (Semi Finals)
- Current season

Uniforms
Home colours	Away colours

Records
- Challenge Cups: Quarter finalists (2009)
- League 1: 1 (2008)
- Most capped: 234 – Joe Brown
- Highest points scorer: 449 – Benn Hardcastle

Newcastle Thunder is a professional rugby league club based in Newcastle upon Tyne, England. It was founded in 2000 as Gateshead Thunder, after the merger of the original Gateshead Thunder into Hull F.C. in 1999. The Thunder were based in Gateshead until 2014. In 2015, the club relocated and changed its name to Newcastle Thunder.

In 2024, the Newcastle Thunder made a return to Gateshead as their playing base. For 2025 they will play their home games at Crow Trees Ground in Swalwell, home of Blaydon RFC. The club currently competes in the Championship.

== History ==
The club was formed by the Thunder 2000 working group, formed by supporters of the original Gateshead Thunder after that organisation made the decision to merge with Hull Sharks at the end of the 1999 season. The new club, like the former club, played their home games at Gateshead International Stadium, also the home ground of Gateshead F.C. The Thunder entered the Northern Ford Premiership for the 2001 season; however, they struggled to compete, and eventually finished 17th out of the 19 clubs.

Gateshead continued to struggle in the following season, finishing bottom of the league in 2002. When the Northern Ford Premiership was split into two divisions for the 2003 season the club joined National League Two, and again finished in the bottom two, being kept off the bottom only by new entrants London Skolars. The club's fortunes began to improve in 2005, a seventh-place finish being enough to gain a first ever place in the play-offs, before losing to Workington Town in their first ever play-off game. The club again finished seventh in 2006, but went on to lose 46–18 to Featherstone Rovers in the play-offs.

In 2008 the club won its first silverware, finishing the season as League 1 champions. As champions, the club were promoted to the Championship, and avoided on-field relegation by finishing seventh under coach Steve McCormack. Thunder's joy at securing a second season in the second tier was however short-lived, as the club was wound up following a dispute between the directors. A new company was formed to continue the club, however the club had to restart as a Championship 1 side, effectively being relegated for the 2010 season.

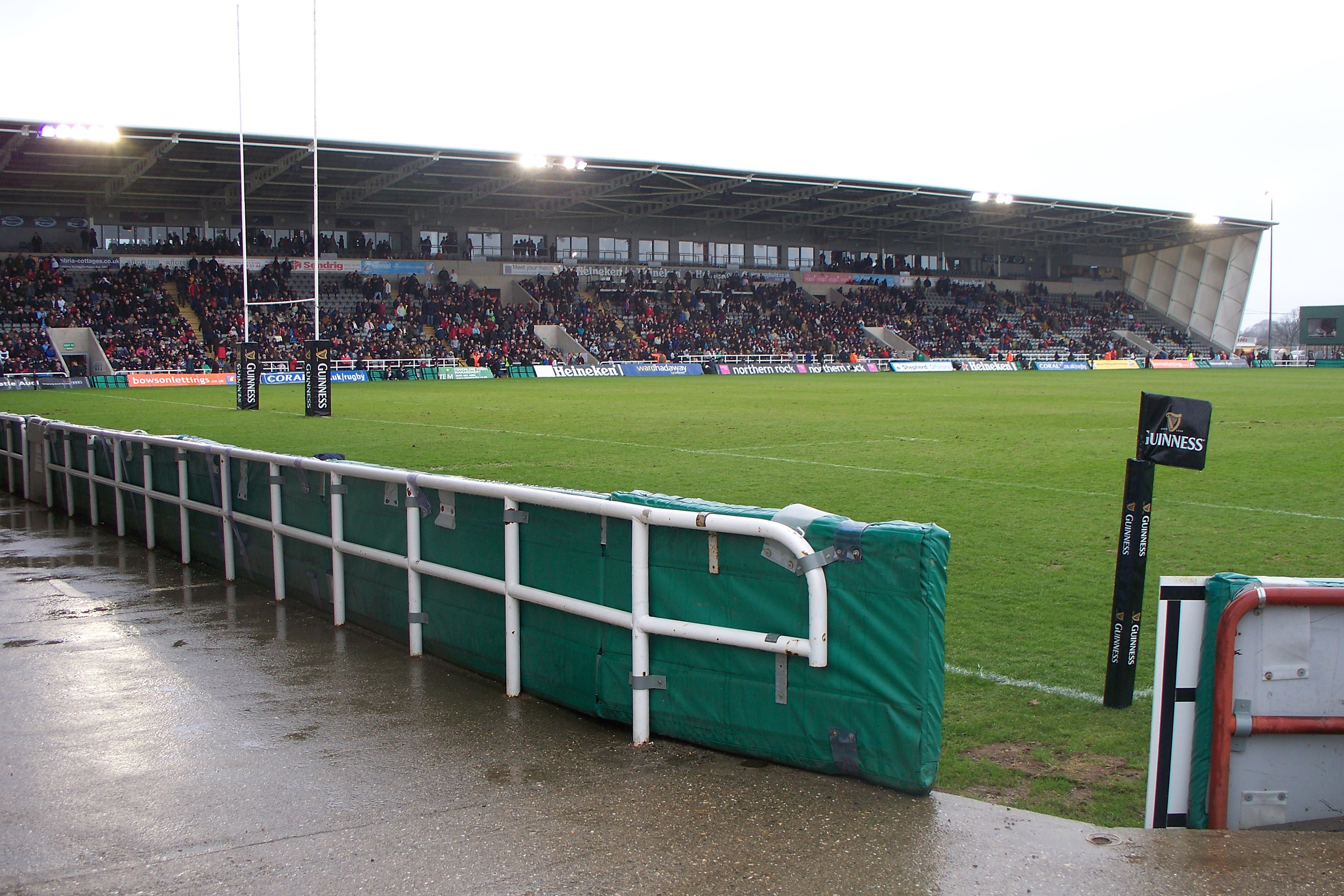
Kingston Park became the Thunder's home ground in 2015

Gateshead Thunder were taken over by the owners of rugby union side Newcastle Falcons in 2015. The club was rebranded as Newcastle Thunder and applied for permission to use Kingston Park in Newcastle as their home ground.

Further silverware was earned in 2016, when Newcastle defeated North Wales Crusaders to win the League 1 Shield

On 10 December 2020, Thunder were promoted to the Championship by a committee to replace Leigh who were, in turn, promoted to Super League to replace Toronto Wolfpack, who went out of business. Newcastle began playing in the 2021 Championship season.

For the 2022 season, Newcastle announced they were adopting the full time professional model in order to aid promotion to the Super League. This lasted for one year with the club reverting back to part time semi professional status for 2023.

Following the 2023 RFL Championship season, Newcastle were relegated to League One after winning five of 27 matches. On 13 October 2023, the club announced that they had withdrawn from League One for the 2024 season. A club statement said "Unfortunately, the impact of COVID-19, combined with the low levels of regional growth and development in the game, means it just isn't feasible to continue." An attempt to revive the club was immediately launched under former chairman, Keith Christie. Despite an application to rejoin the league not having been accepted by the RFL, the RFL did include the club in the fixture lists for the 1895 Cup and the 2024 League One season when these were announced at the start of December 2023. In December 2023 the RFL approved the club's change of ownership and confirmed Newcastle's participation in the 2024 season competitions.

On 16 May 2024, the club announced that it would return to the Gateshead International Stadium for the rest of the 2024 season.

For 2025 the club moved to play at the Crow Trees Ground, home of Blaydon RFC.

== Kit manufacturers and sponsors ==
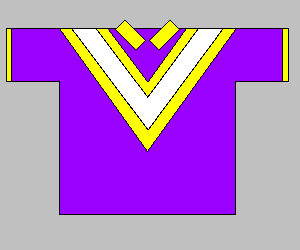
2009 shirt

Gateshead Thunder emblem

Years	Kit Manufacturer	Main Shirt Sponsor
1999	Avec	Northern Electric & Gas
2000–2001	exito	none
2004–2005	Halbro	Halbro
2006	Nike	none
2010	XBlades	GMC Transport Limited
2011–2012	Puma	GMC Transport Limited
2013	Stag	Jack Coupe and Sons
2014	Stag	Gateshead College
2015	Impact	Gizmowizard
2016	Errea	Greene King IPA
2017	ISC	PTM Group
2018–2019	ISC	Tyne Metropolitan College
2020–2023	Macron	Tyne Metropolitan College
2026	DXG	Mini
2027	AVR	Land Rover

== 2027 squad ==
2027 Newcastle Thunder squad
First team squad		Coaching staff
(England) Alex Clegg – WG, CE; (England) Bailey Dawson – SR; (England) Oscar Doran – WG; (England) Tobias Gibson – PR, LF; (England) Evan Lawther – CE; (Scotland) Kieran Moran – PR; (England) Bailey Pemberton – SR, LF	(England) Taylor Pemberton – HK; (England) Cain Robb – HK; (England) Tyler Walton – LF, SR; (England) Brad Ward – WG; (England) Noah Whittingham – SR; (England) Charlie Yeomans – SO, SH	Head coach: (England) Craig Huby; Assistant coach: (England) Alex Donaghy; Legend: (c) Captain(s); (vc) Vice-captain(s)

== 2027 transfers ==
=== Gains ===
Player	From	Contract	Date
(England) Evan Lawther	Workington Town	1 year	3 November 2026
(England) Tobias Gibson	Workington Town	1 year	4 November 2026
(England) Oscar Doran	Workington Town	1 year	5 November 2026
(England) Charlie Yeomans	Wigan Warriors	1 year	6 November 2026
(England) Bailey Pemberton	Rochdale Hornets	1 year	9 November 2026
(Scotland) Kieran Moran	Birmingham Hurricanes	1 year	10 November 2026
(England) Bailey Dawson	Goole Vikings	1 year	11 November 2026
(England) Alex Clegg	Stanley River Wolves	1 year	12 November 2026
(England) Cain Robb	Castleford Tigers	1 year	20 November 2026

=== Losses ===
Player	From	Contract	Date
(Australia) Cody Hunter	York Knights	2 years	16 September 2026
(Serbia) David Nofoaluma	York Knights	2 years	18 September 2026
(England) Tom Inman	York Knights	2 years	23 September 2026
(New Zealand) Mitch Clark	York Knights	End of loan spell - Return to parent club	27 September 2026
(England) Will Dagger	York Knights	End of loan spell - Return to parent club	27 September 2026
(England) Kieran Hudson	York Knights	End of loan spell - Return to parent club	27 September 2026
(Australia) Ryan Jackson	York Knights	End of loan spell - Return to parent club	27 September 2026
(Australia) Jordan Lipp	York Knights	End of loan spell - Return to parent club	27 September 2026
(England) Will Roberts	York Knights	End of loan spell - Return to parent club	27 September 2026
(Australia) John Sagaga	York Knights	End of loan spell - Return to parent club	27 September 2026
(France) Justin Sangaré	York Knights	End of loan spell - Return to parent club	27 September 2026
(England) Jack Smith	York Knights	End of loan spell - Return to parent club	27 September 2026
(England) Alfie Horwell	Castleford Tigers	End of loan spell - Return to parent club	27 September 2026
(France) Maxime Rostang	Albi Rugby League	1 year	27 October 2026
(England) Myles Harrison	York Knights	2 years	3 November 2026
(England) Joe Law	York Knights	2 years	3 November 2026
(England) Harvey Reynolds	York Knights	2 years	3 November 2026
(England) Andy Djeukessi	York Knights	1 year	5 November 2026
(Fiji) King Vuniyayawa	Oldham RLFC	2 years	2 November 2026
(Wales) Bailey Antrobus	Doncaster RLFC	2 years	18 November 2026

== Players ==
=== Notable former players ===
(in alphabetical order)

- Russell Aitken
- Ryan Bailey
- Matt Barron
- David Bates
- Luke Branighan
- Tabua Cakacaka
- Scott Dyson
- Paul Franze
- Ashley Gibson
- Andrew Henderson
- Kris Kahler
- Jordan Meads
- Wade Liddell
- David Mycoe
- Chris Parker
- Damien Reid
- Stewart Sanderson
- Netani Suka
- Kerrod Walters
- Nick Youngquest

== Past coaches ==
Also see Category:Newcastle Thunder coaches

=== Gateshead Thunder ===
- Shaun McRae (1999)
- Andy Kelly (2001–2002)
- Paul Fletcher (2003)
- Seamus McCallion (2004)
- Dean Thomas (2005–2006)
- Dave Woods (2006)
- Chris Hood (2009)
- Steve McCormack (2009)
- Richard Pell (2010–2011)
- Kevin Neighbour (2012-13)
- Stanley Gene (2013–2014)

=== Newcastle Thunder ===
- Mick Mantelli (2016–2017)
- Jason Payne (2017–2019
- Simon Finnigan (2019–2020)
- Eamon O'Carroll (2020–2022)
- Denis Betts (2022)
- Chris Thorman (2023-2025)
- Graham Steadman (interim) (2025-26)
- Craig Huby (2027-)

== Records ==
Correct to September 2017

=== Player records ===
- Most tries in a match: 5 by Andy Walker vs London Skolars 22 June 2003
- Most points in a season: 246 by Chris Birch, 2005
- Most career tries: 64 by Kevin Neighbour, 2001–2013
- Most career goals: 137 by Paul Thorman, 2001–2004
- Most career points: 365 by Paul Thorman, 2001–2004

=== Team records ===
- Biggest win:

98-6 v. West Wales (at Kingston Park Stadium, 23 September 2018)

- Biggest defeat:

132-0 v. Blackpool (at Memorial Stadium, 16 May 2010)

=== Attendance records ===
- Highest all-time attendance:

6,631 v. Bradford (at Gateshead International Stadium, 16 May 1999)

== Seasons ==
Season (As Gateshead Thunder)	League										Challenge Cup	Other competitions	
Season (As Gateshead Thunder)	Division	P	W	D	L	F	A	Pts	Pos	Play-offs	Challenge Cup	Other competitions	
2001	Northern Ford Premiership	28	2	0	26	346	990	4	17th	Did not qualify	R4		
2002	Northern Ford Premiership	27	0	1	26	338	1108	1	18th	Did not qualify	R3		
2003	National League Two	18	3	1	14	365	663	7	9th	Did not qualify	R3		
2004	National League Two	18	1	0	17	298	715	2	10th	Did not qualify	R3		
2005	National League Two	18	8	1	9	516	508	17	6th	Lost in elimination playoffs	R3		
2006	National League Two	22	11	0	11	547	540	22	7th	Lost in elimination playoffs	R3		
2007	National League Two	22	6	0	16	381	692	21	11th	Did not qualify	R4		
2008	National League Two	22	19	0	3	767	415	59	1st	N/A (Note: League leaders do more enter third division playoffs)	R3		
2009	Championship	20	9	2	9	4610	657	32	7th (Note: Enforced Relegation due to Salary Cap Breach)	Did not qualify	QF		
2010	Championship 1	20	1	0	19	236	1232	-2	11th	Did not qualify	R3		
2011	Championship 1	20	0	1	19	268	1094	2	10th	Did not qualify	R4		
2012	Championship 1	18	1	0	17	276	824	5	10th	Did not qualify	R4		
2013	Championship 1	16	4	1	11	356	542	20	7th	Did not qualify	R3		
2014	Championship 1	20	11	9	0	615	576	36	4th	Lost in semi-final	R3		
Season (As Newcastle Thunder)	League										Challenge Cup	Other competitions	
Season (As Newcastle Thunder)	Division	P	W	D	L	F	A	Pts	Pos	Play-offs	Challenge Cup	Other competitions	
2015	Championship 1	22	11	11	0	555	552	22	8th	Did not qualify	R4		
2016	League 1	14	7	1	6	404	368	15	9th	Won in Shield Final	R3		
2017	League 1	15	9	0	6	459	328	18	6th	Fifth in Super 8s	R4		
2018	League 1	26	14	0	12	841	520	28	8th	Did not qualify	R4		
2019	League 1	20	14	1	5	741	364	29	3rd	Lost in play-off final	R4	1895 Cup	R2
2020	League 1	League abandoned due to the COVID-19 pandemic							(Note: Newcastle were promoted by an independent panel following Toronto Wolfpack's expulsion.)		R6		
2021	Championship	20	7	1	12	431	627	15	11th	Did not qualify	R3 (Note: Officially round 1 due to the competitions temporary restructure in 2021.)	1895 Cup	R1
2022	Championship	27	7	1	19	559	877	15	12th	Did not qualify	R4		
2023	Championship	25	4	1	20	361	862	9	14th	Did not qualify	R5		
2024	League One	20	0	0	20	190	1124	0	9th	Did not qualify	R3	1895 Cup	GS
2025	League One	18	0	0	18	98	992	0	10th (Note: Promotion due to the merging League One and the Championship)	Play-offs cancelled	R2	1895 Cup	PR
2026	Championship	24	21	0	3	1093	302	42	2nd	Lost in Semi-finals	R2	1895 Cup	QF

== Honours ==
- RFL League 1:

Winners (1): 2008

- RFL League 1:

Promotion(1): 2020
- League 1 Shield:

Winners (1): 2016

== Reserves ==
As of 2026, Newcastle entered a reserve team, Newcastle Lightening, into the Yorkshire Mens League, playing their games as double headers with the first team.

== See also ==
- Rugby Football League expansion
