= 2025 Leeds Rhinos season =

English rugby league team season

Leeds Rhinos 2025 season
- 2025 Super League season Rank: 4th
- Play-off result: Eliminators
- Challenge Cup: Round 4
- 2025 record: Wins: 19; draws: 0; losses: 11
- Points scored: For: 610; against: 310

Team information
- Club President: Gill Spencer
- Head Coach: Brad Arthur
- Captain: Cameron Smith Ash Handley
- Stadium: Headingley Rugby Stadium
- Avg. attendance: 14,999
- High attendance: 16,863; Hull Kingston Rovers, 25 April
- Low attendance: 14,234; Castleford Tigers, 2 March

Top scorers
- Tries: Ryan Hall (10)
- Goals: Jake Connor (72)
- Points: Jake Connor (172)
Home colours	Away colours	Third colours
← 2024	List of seasons	2026 →

The 2025 season was Leeds Rhinos' twenty-ninth consecutive season playing in England's top division of rugby league. They competed in the 2025 Super League season and in the 2025 Challenge Cup.

== Preseason friendlies ==
Date and time	Versus	H/A	Venue	Result	Score	Tries	Goals	Attendance	Report
26 December 2024; 11:00 (Note: Wetherby Whaler Festive Challenge)	Wakefield Trinity	H	Headingley Rugby Stadium	W	18–16	Connor (2), Brown	Connor (2/2), J. Sinfield (1/1)	10,883	
26 January; 15:00 (Note: Ash Handley's testimonial match)	Wigan Warriors	H	Headingley Rugby Stadium	W	22–4	Handley, C. Smith, Hall, Newman	Connor (3/4)	5,055	

== Super League ==
Date and time	Round	Versus	H/A	Venue	Result	Score	Tries	Goals	Attendance	TV	Pos.	Report
15 February; 15:00	Round 1	Wakefield Trinity	H	Headingley Rugby Stadium	L	12–14	Newman, Lisone	Connor (2/2)	15,374	Sky Sports +	11th	
22 February; 15:00	Round 2	Salford Red Devils	A	Salford Community Stadium	W	32–6	Lumb (2), Gannon, Handley, Bentley, Hall	Connor (3/6 + 1 pen.)	5,798	Sky Sports +	6th	
2 March; 15:00	Round 3	Castleford Tigers	H	Headingley Rugby Stadium	W	38–24	Connor (2), Handley (2) Palasia, Hall, Lumb	Connor (5/7)	14,234	Sky Sports +	5th	
8 March; 17:30 (GMT)	Round 4	Catalans Dragons	A	Stade Gilbert Brutus	L	0–11			8,125	Sky Sports +	6th	
22 March; 17:30	Round 5	Wigan Warriors	H	Headingley Rugby Stadium	W	12–10	Lumb, Sinfield	Connor (1/2 + 1 pen.)	15,966	Sky Sports Main Event	6th	
28 March; 20:00	Round 6 (Note: 5,000th match of Super League rugby)	Warrington Wolves	A	Halliwell Jones Stadium	L	14–16	Lumb, McDonnell, Hall	Connor (1/3)	10,523	Sky Sports Action	7th	
10 April; 20:00	Round 7	Salford Red Devils	A	Salford Community Stadium	W	28–0	McDonnell (4), Miller	Miller (3/5 + 1 pen.)	4,159	Sky Sports Action	6th	
18 April, 17:30	Round 8 (Rivals Round)	Huddersfield Giants	H	Headingley Rugby Stadium	W	28–6	Miller, Watkins, Handley, Connor, Hall	Miller (4/5)	14,566	Sky Sports +	6th	
25 April, 20:00	Round 9	Hull Kingston Rovers	H	Headingley Rugby Stadium	L	14–20	Handley, Lumb	Miller (1/2 + 2 pen.)	16,863	Sky Sports Action	6th	
3 May; 19:30	Round 10 (Magic Weekend)	St Helens	N	St James' Park	W	17–4	Lumb, Miller, Gannon	Miller (2/3); Drop-goals: Sinfield	31,294 (Note: Attendance recorded across three fixtures.)	Sky Sports Action	4th	
16 May; 20:00	Round 11	Hull F.C.	H	Headingley Rugby Stadium	W	18–16	McDonnell, Holroyd, Lumb, Hall	Miller (1/4)	15,602	Sky Sports +	4th	
24 May; 14:30	Round 12	Castleford Tigers	A	Wheldon Road	W	29–6	Newman (2), Croft, Hall, Lisone	Connor (4/5); Drop-goals: Connor	8,069	Sky Sports + BBC iPlayer	3rd	
31 May; 16:30	Round 13	Wakefield Trinity	H	Headingley Rugby Stadium	W	22–18	Newman, Connor, Lumb	Connor (3/3 + 2 pen.)		Sky Sports + BBC Two	3rd	
14 June; 17:30	Round 14	Warrington Wolves	H	Headingley Rugby Stadium	W	36–12	Smith (2), Croft, Holroyd, Connor, Gannon	Connor (4/6 + 1 pen.), Watkins (1/1)	14,306	Sky Sports +	3rd	
20 June; 20:00	Round 15	St Helens	A	Totally Wicked Stadium	L	4–18	Lumb	Connor (0/1)	11,179	Sky Sports +	4th	
27 June; 20:00 (Note: Match played as part of a double bill following a Women's Super League match against the opponent's women's team.)	Round 16	Leigh Leopards	H	Headingley Rugby Stadium	W	48–30	Watkins (2), Newman (2), Miller, Smith, Holroyd, Olędzki	Connor (8/8)		Sky Sports Action	3rd	
6 July; 15:00	Round 17	Hull Kingston Rovers	A	Craven Park	W	14–8	Lisone, Miller	Connor (4/6 + 1 pen.)		Sky Sports Action	3rd	
11 July; 20:00	Round 18	St Helens	H	Headingley Rugby Stadium	L	0–6			15,093	Sky Sports Main Event	5th	
18 July; 20:00	Round 19	Salford Red Devils	H	Headingley Rugby Stadium	W	42–6	Edgell (3), Miller, Newman, McDonnell, Jenkins	Connor (6/7 + 1 pen.)		Sky Sports +	4th	
24 July; 20:00	Round 20	Wakefield Trinity	A	Belle Vue	L	14–15	Lisone, O'Connor	Connor (1/1 + 1 pen.), Sinfield (1/1)	9,252	Sky Sports +	5th	
7 August; 20:00	Round 21	Leigh Leopards	A	Leigh Sports Village	W	22–14	Miller, Lisone, Bentley, Croft	Connor (3/4)		Sky Sports Action	4th	
16 August; 15:00	Round 22	Castleford Tigers	A	Wheldon Road	W	64–6	Hall (2), Croft (2), Handley (2), Newman, Miller, Cassell, Bentley, Connor	Connor (9/10), Hankinson (1/1)		Sky Sports +	3rd	
21 August; 20:00	Round 23	Hull Kingston Rovers	H	Headingley Rugby Stadium	W	28–6	Connor, Cassell, Miller, Newman	Connor (4/4 + 2 pen.)	16,260	Sky Sports Action	4th	
30 August; 15:00	Round 24	Hull F.C.	A	MKM Stadium	W	34–0	Hall, Watkins, Connor, Gannon, Croft, McDonnell	Connor (5/6)		Sky Sports +	3rd	
6 September; 17:30	Round 25	Huddersfield Giants	A	Kirklees Stadium	W	26–0	Newman, Gannon, Croft, Olędzki	Miller (3/4), Connor (2 pen.)		Sky Sports +	3rd	
11 September; 20:00	Round 26	Catalans Dragons	H	Headingley Rugby Stadium	L	8–16	Hall, Croft	Miller (0/2)		Sky Sports +	4th	
19 September; 20:00	Round 27	Wigan Warriors	A	Brick Community Stadium	L	6–22	Hankinson	J. Sinfield (1/1)		Sky Sports Action	4th	

=== Table ===
Pos	Team	Pld	W	D	L	PF	PA	PD	Pts	Qualification
1	Hull Kingston Rovers (L, C)	27	22	0	5	786	292	+494	44	Advance to Semi-finals
2	Wigan Warriors	27	21	0	6	794	333	+461	42	Advance to Semi-finals
3	Leigh Leopards	27	19	1	7	619	452	+167	39	Advance to Eliminators
4	Leeds Rhinos	27	18	0	9	610	310	+300	36	Advance to Eliminators
5	St Helens	27	17	0	10	677	314	+363	34	Advance to Eliminators
6	Wakefield Trinity (Note: Salford forfeited their game against Wakefield. Under RFL operational rules, the game is recorded as a 48–0 victory for Wakefield, and converse loss for Salford, with the points scored and conceded applying to both teams.)	27	15	0	12	688	458	+230	30	Advance to Eliminators
7	Hull FC	27	13	1	13	539	461	+78	27	
8	Warrington Wolves	27	10	0	17	480	641	−161	20	
9	Catalans Dragons	27	10	0	17	425	652	−227	20	
10	Huddersfield Giants	27	7	0	20	347	738	−391	14	
11	Castleford Tigers	27	6	0	21	396	815	−419	12	
12	Salford Red Devils (R)	27	3	0	24	234	1129	−895	4 (Note: On 22 September 2025, Salford Red Devils were deducted two points breaching "a number of RFL operational rules" surrounding their team selection for their Round 1 fixture against St Helens on 15 February 2025.)	Relegated to Championship

(C) Champions; (L) League Leaders' Shield Winners; (R) Relegated

=== Play-offs ===
Date and time	Round	Versus	H/A	Venue	Result	Score	Tries	Goals	Attendance	TV	Report
27 September; 20:00	Eliminators	St Helens	H	Headingley Rugby Stadium	L	14–16	Hankinson, McDonnell	Connor (2/2 + 1 pen.)		Sky Sports Action	

== Challenge Cup ==
On 25 June 2024, the RFL announced a change to the Challenge Cup format, totalling 7 rounds compared to the previous 9, with Super League teams entering to play away from home at round 3.

Leeds Rhinos were drawn on 14 January to play the Wests Warriors, who play in the Southern Conference League, in Round 3, following fixtures in Rounds 1 and 2 that eliminated the British Army and the Royal Navy rugby league teams from contention. The fixture was originally set to be played away at Wests Warriors' Twyford Avenue Sports Ground venue in Acton, however both teams later agreed to swap the venue to the Headingley Rugby Stadium.

Following their victory against the Wests Warriors, Leeds Rhinos were drawn on 15 February to play St Helens away at the Totally Wicked Stadium on 14 March. Leeds were ultimately knocked out of the 2025 Challenge Cup by St Helens during the Round 4 fixture.

Date and time	Round	Versus	H/A	Venue	Result	Score	Tries	Goals	Attendance	TV	Report
8 February; 12:00	Round 3	Wests Warriors	H	Headingley Rugby Stadium	W	92–0	Hall (3), Lisone (3), Sinfield (2), Gannon (2), Lumb, Connor, Smith, Frawley, Edgell, Holroyd	Connor (14/16)	1,310	Not televised	
14 March; 20:00	Round 4	St Helens	A	Totally Wicked Stadium	L	14–22	Handley, Newman	Connor (2/2 + 1 pen.)	7,531	The Sportsman	

== Transfers ==
=== Gains ===
Player	Club	Contract	Date
(England) Ryan Hall	Hull Kingston Rovers	1 Year	April 2024
(Samoa) Keenan Palasia	Gold Coast Titans	2 Years	October 2024
(Australia) Cooper Jenkins	Norths Devils	2 Years	October 2024
(England) Jake Connor	Huddersfield Giants	2 Years	October 2024
(Fiji) Maika Sivo	Parramatta Eels	2 Years	October 2024
(Australia) Ethan Clark-Wood	Gold Coast Titans	1 Year	February 2025
(England) Kallum Watkins	Salford Red Devils	End of season	April 2025
(England) Chris Hankinson	Salford Red Devils	End of season	August 2025

==== Loans in ====
Player	Club	Loan period	Date
(England) Joe Shorrocks	Salford Red Devils	End of season	August 2025

=== Losses ===
Player	Club	Contract	Date
(England) James Donaldson	Bradford Bulls	2 Years	August 2024
(Papua New Guinea) Rhyse Martin	Hull Kingston Rovers	2 Years	August 2024
(Tonga) David Fusitu'a	TBC		September 2024
(England) Corey Johnson	Sheffield Eagles	2 Years	November 2024
(France) Justin Sangare	Salford Red Devils	2 Years	November 2024
(France) Mickaël Goudemand	Racing Club Albi XIII	End of Super XIII season	November 2024
(England) Kieran Hudson	York Knights	1 Year	December 2024
(England) Leon Ruan	Hull Kingston Rovers	2 Years	December 2024
(Australia) Paul Momirovski	FC Lézignan XIII	End of Super XIII season	December 2024
(Wales) Luis Roberts	Midlands Hurricanes	1 Year	February 2025

==== Loans out ====
Player	Club	Loan period	Date
(Australia) Matt Frawley	Huddersfield Giants	Three weeks	June 2025
(England) Ben Littlewood	Salford Red Devils	One week (Note: By special dispensation of the RFL; minimum loan period is usually two weeks.)	August 2025
(England) Riley Lumb	Salford Red Devils	One week	August 2025

== Squad ==
Leeds Rhinos 2025 Squad
First team squad			Coaching staff
1 (Australia) Lachie Miller – FB, WG; 2 (Fiji) Maika Sivo – WG; 3 (England) Harry Newman – CE; 4 (England) Ash Handley (c) – WG, CE; 5 (England) Ryan Hall – WG; 6 (Australia) Brodie Croft – SO, SH; 8 (England) Mikołaj Olędzki – PR; 9 (England) Andy Ackers – HK; 10 (Samoa) Keenan Palasia – PR, LK, SR; 11 (Ireland) James Bentley – SR, LF, HK; 12 (Ireland) James McDonnell – CE, SR; 13 (England) Cameron Smith (c) – LF, SR	14 (England) Jarrod O'Connor – LF, HK; 15 (Samoa) Sam Lisone – PR; 16 (England) Morgan Gannon – SR, LF; 17 (Australia) Cooper Jenkins – PR, SR; 18 (England) Jake Connor – CE, FB, SO, SH; 19 (England) Tom Holroyd – PR; 20 (England) Jack Sinfield – SH, SO; 21 (England) Alfie Edgell – FB, WG; 22 (England) Tom Nicholson-Watton – PR; 23 (England) Riley Lumb – FB, WG; 24 (England) Ben Littlewood – SR; 25 (England) Ned McCormack – CE	26 (England) Max Simpson – CE; 27 (Australia) Ethan Clark-Wood – CE, WG; 28 (England) Kallum Watkins – SR, CE; 29 (England) Presley Cassell – LF, PR; 30 (England) George Brown – SO, SH; 31 (England) Chris Hankinson – CE, WG; 32 (England) Joe Shorrocks – LF, SR; -- (England) Fergus McCormack – SH, SO	Head coach: (Australia) Brad Arthur; Assistant coaches: (England) Jamie Langley; (Ireland) Scott Grix; (England) Chev Walker; Legend: (c) Captain(s); (vc) Vice-captain(s); (red card) = suspended; = injured; (gk) = Goal kicker; Updated: 27 September 2025; Source(s): Rhinos reveal squad numbers for 2025
