= Leeds Rugby Limited =

Leeds Rugby Ltd
- Type: Private limited company
- Founded: 1996
- Founder: Gary Hetherington; Paul Caddick
- Headquarters: Headingley, Leeds, West Yorkshire, England
- Key people: Gary Hetherington (Chief Executive Officer)
- Divisions: Leeds Rhinos Rugby League Football Club; Leeds Tykes Rugby Union Football Club
- Website: Archived 4 June 2011 at the Wayback Machine

Leeds Rugby Limited is a dual code rugby partnership formed in 1996 between the main rugby league and rugby union sides in the city of Leeds, the Leeds Rhinos and the Leeds Tykes. Both teams played at the Headingley Carnegie Stadium until the Leeds Tykes moved out after the 2020–21 season.

== See also ==
- List of Super League rugby league club owners
- List of owners of English football clubs
