= Gary Hetherington =

English RL administrator, owner, coach and former rugby league footballer

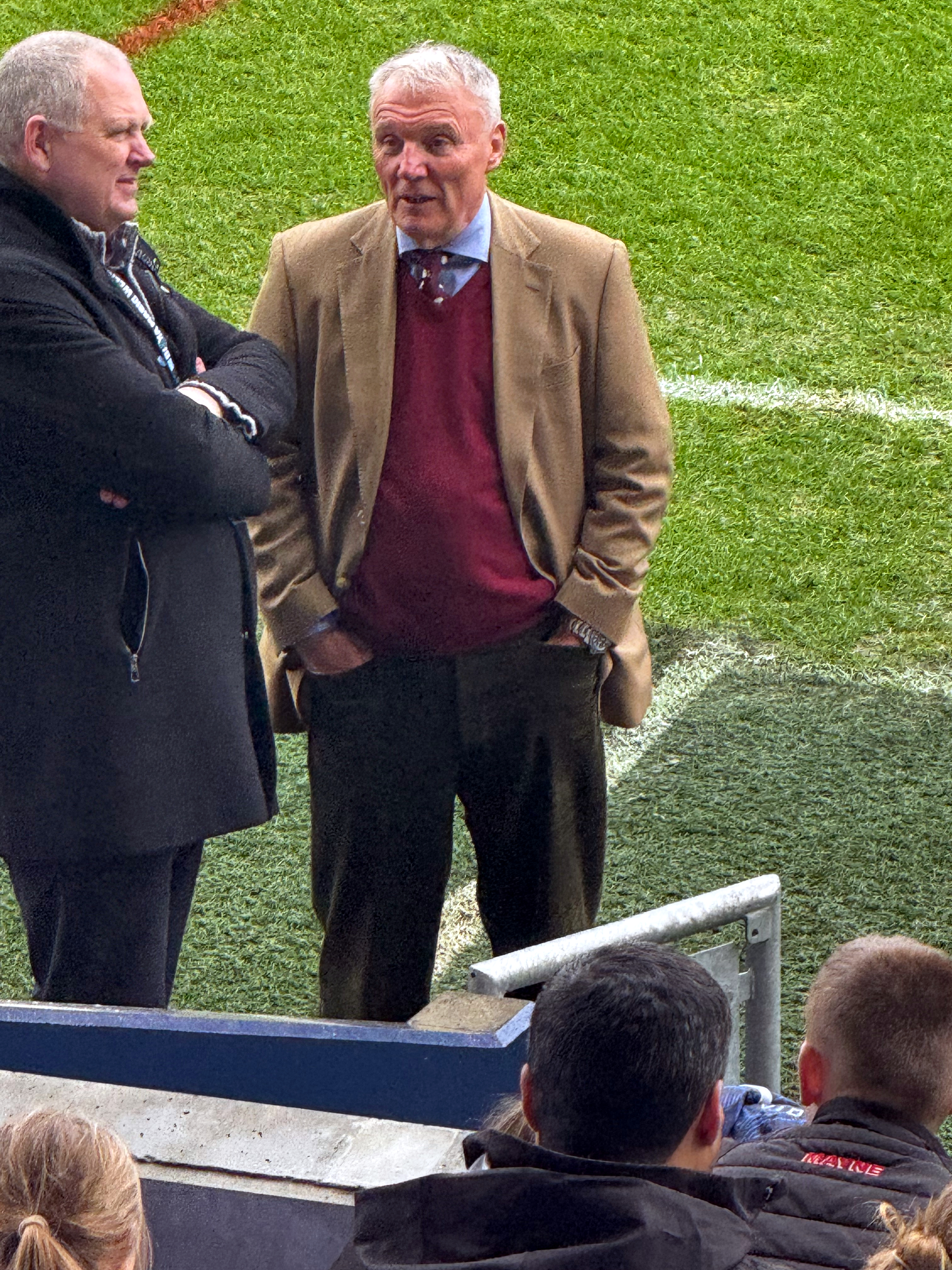

Personal information
- Full name: Gary Hetherington
- Born: 24 June 1954 (age 71) Castleford, West Riding of Yorkshire, England

Playing information
- Position: Hooker, Second-row
Club
| Years | Team | Pld | T | G | FG | P |
|---|---|---|---|---|---|---|
| 1973–74 | Wakefield Trinity | 5 | 0 | 4 | 0 | 8 |
| 1974–78 | York |
| 1976 | → Wigan (loan) | 1 | 0 | 0 | 0 | 0 |
| 1978–81 | Leeds | 53 | 9 | 54 | 0 | 135 |
| 1980–81 | → Hunslet (loan) | 4 | 1 | 0 | 1 | 4 |
| 1981–83 | Huddersfield | 50 | 6 | 6 | 1 | 31 |
| 1983–84 | Kent Invicta | 18 | 1 | 0 | 0 | 4 |
| 1984–88 | Sheffield Eagles | 65 | 5 | 0 | 3 | 23 |
| | Total | 196 | 22 | 64 | 5 | 205 |

Coaching information
Club
| Years | Team | Gms | W | D | L | W% |
| 1986–93 | Sheffield Eagles | 136 | 55 | 3 | 78 | 40 |
| 1993–96 | Sheffield Eagles |
| | Total | 136 | 55 | 3 | 78 | 40 |
- Source: As of 9 December 2023

Gary Hetherington (born 1954) is an English professional rugby league executive and former professional rugby league footballer and coach. He is the chief executive officer of the London Broncos in the Championship.

As a player, Hetherington played as a hooker or second-row forward for Wakefield Trinity, York, Leeds, Hunslet (loan), Kent Invicta and Huddersfield. He finished his playing career at Sheffield Eagles, a club which he founded in 1984.

After several years in roles as coach and general manager, he sold his shares at Sheffield Eagles in 1996 to become chief executive at Leeds Rhinos. Hetherington was chief executive of the Rhinos from 1996 to 2025.

== Playing career ==
Hetherington made his début for Wakefield Trinity in January 1973. In 1978, he joined Leeds from York. In September 1981, he was signed by Huddersfield for a fee of around £5,000. He left the club in February 1983 after paying Huddersfield £1,000 to be released from his own contract.

== Coaching and administrative career ==
During his playing days, Hetherington played a key role in setting up the first rugby league players' trade union.

After being turned down for a coaching role at York, Hetherington became interested in forming his own rugby league club, and founded Sheffield Eagles in 1984.

After retiring as a player, Hetherington remained with Sheffield Eagles as coach. He stepped down as coach in April 1993, but took charge again eight months later.

He joined Leeds in 1996, and rebranded the club in 1997, adding the Rhinos nickname. In his time at Leeds, the club has won eight Super League Grand Finals, three Challenge Cups and three World Club Challenges.

In 1997, he and Paul Caddick bought Leeds Rhinos rugby league team, and they co-founded Leeds Rugby Limited.

He was President of the Rugby Football League in 2004. His wife Kath was President of the Rugby Football League in 1995.

In September 2025 Hetherington was part of an ownership group consisting of businessman Grant Wechsel, and Darren Lockyer in the successful takeover of the London Broncos. In October 2025 the London club were controversially overlooked for elevation to the Super League in favour of the Bradford Bulls.

== See also ==
- List of Super League rugby league club owners
- List of owners of English football clubs
