= Paul Caddick =

British businessman (born 1950)

Paul Caddick MBE
- Born: July 1950 (age 75); Castleford, West Yorkshire, England
- Occupation: Businessman
- Known for: Co-owner, Leeds Rhinos
- Title: Founder of Caddick Group

Paul Caddick (born July 1950) is a British businessman who is the founder of Caddick Group, a civil engineering business established in 1979, and Moda Living, a property development company. He is currently the director of 119 companies.

== Early life ==
Paul Caddick is the son of a miner.

== Career ==
Cadddick worked for West Yorkshire County Council, John Laing and the civil engineers Sir Lindsay Parkinson, before starting his own business in 1980.

In 1997, he and Gary Hetherington purchased Leeds Rhinos rugby team, and they co-founded Leeds Rugby Limited. He is also the owner, via Caddick Group's majority stake in Leeds Rhinos, of the Headingley rugby ground.

== See also ==
- List of Super League rugby league club owners
- List of owners of English football clubs
