= List of NRL club owners =

List of club owners in the National Rugby League (NRL)

This is a list of club owners in the National Rugby League (NRL), the top league of professional rugby league clubs in Australasia.

== Current clubs ==
| Club | Owner(s) | Estimated brand value ($AUD millions) | Notes |
|---|---|---|---|
| Brisbane Broncos | News Corp Australia (68.87%); BXBX Pty Ltd (9.79%); Lake Morepeth Pty Ltd (6.73%); Others (14.61%) | 124 | |
| Canterbury-Bankstown Bulldogs | Bulldogs Rugby League Club Limited | 51 | |
| Canberra Raiders | Canberra District Rugby League Football Club Limited | | |
| Cronulla-Sutherland Sharks | Cronulla Sutherland District Rugby League Football Club | | |
| Dolphins | Redcliffe Dolphins Rugby League Club Limited | 49 | |
| Gold Coast Titans | Rebecca Frizelle & Brett Frizelle; Matthew Johns & Trish Johns; Gordon Tallis & Jemma Elder; Hedley Thomas & Ruth Mathewson; Billy Cross & Jodie Cross; Michael Atkins & Jodie Atkins | | |
| Manly-Warringah Sea Eagles | Scott Penn (100%) | | |
| Melbourne Storm | Bart Campbell (30%); Matt Tripp (25%); Gerry Ryan (25%); Brett Ralph & Shaun Ralph (20%) | 55 | |
| Newcastle Knights | Western Suburbs (N'cle) Leagues Club Limited | 43 | |
| New Zealand Warriors | Autex Industries (Mark Robinson) | | |
| North Queensland Cowboys | Cowboys Leagues Club Limited | 72 | |
| Papua New Guinea Chiefs | Australian Rugby League Commission and Australian Government | 600 | |
| Parramatta Eels | Parramatta Leagues Club | 71 | |
| Penrith Panthers | Panthers Leagues Club | 108 | |
| Perth Bears | Australian Rugby League Commission | | |
| South Sydney Rabbitohs | Blackcourt League Investments Pty Ltd (Russell Crowe, James Packer, Mike Cannon-Brookes) (75%); Financial Members of the club (25%) | 73 | |
| St George Illawarra Dragons | WIN Corporation (50%); St George Leagues Club (50%) | | |
| Sydney Roosters | Eastern Suburbs District Rugby League Football Club Limited | 68 | |
| Wests Tigers | Wests Magpies Pty Ltd (90%); Balmain District Rugby League Football Club (10%) | 42 | |

== See also ==
- List of Super League rugby league club owners
- List of AFL club owners
