= List of Super League rugby league club owners =

This is a list of club owners in the Super League, the top league of professional rugby league clubs in Europe.

== Current Super League Clubs ==
Club	Owner(s)	Estimated net worth	Source of wealth
Castleford Tigers	(United Kingdom) Martin Jepson		Ergo Real Estate
Catalans Dragons	(France) Bernard Guasch	£5m	Guasch Viandes
Huddersfield Giants	(England) Ken Davy	£75m	Financial advice
Hull F.C.	(England) Andrew Thirkill and David Hood	£175m (Thirkill), £320m (Hood)	Age Partnership, Pure Retirement (Thirkill), Multiflight (Hood)
Hull Kingston Rovers	(United Kingdom) Neil Hudgell	£1.4m	Hudgell solicitors
Leeds Rhinos	(United Kingdom) Paul Caddick	£171m	Caddick Construction
Leigh Leopards	(Australia) Derek Beaumont	£1.25m	AB Sundecks
Salford Red Devils	(United Kingdom) Community Club (100%)	£5m	
St. Helens	(United Kingdom) Eamonn McManus	£75m	Banking
Wakefield Trinity	(United Kingdom) Matt Ellis	£160m	DIY Kitchens/ Finance
Warrington Wolves	(United Kingdom) Simon Moran	£157m	Music and events promoter
Wigan Warriors	(United Kingdom) Mike Danson	£1.2bn	Business entrepreneur

== Former Super League Clubs ==
Club	Owner(s)	Estimated net worth	Source of wealth
Bradford Bulls	(United Kingdom) Phil Sharp, Paul Wild, Nigel Wood, Simon Tidswell, and Omar Khan	£2m	
Crusaders Rugby League	North Wales Crusaders	£0	
Gateshead Thunder	(England) Newcastle Thunder	£0	
Halifax Panthers	(United Kingdom) A consortium of local businessmen	£1m	
London Broncos	(Australia) Darren Lockyer, Grant Wechsel and Gary Hetherington	£3m	
Oldham R.L.F.C.	(England) Mike Ford and Mick Harrington	£1m	
Paris Saint-Germain Rugby League	(France) Paris Saint-Germain FC	£1m	
Sheffield Eagles	(England) Mark Aston	£1m	
Toronto Wolfpack	(Australia) David Argyle and (Canada) Carlo LiVolsi	£1m	
Toulouse Olympique	(France) Bernard Sarrazain	£4m	
Widnes Vikings	(England) Stuart Murphy	£1m	
Workington Town	(United Kingdom) Community Club (100%)	£1m	

== See also ==
- List of NRL club owners
- List of owners of English football clubs
