= Simon Moran =

UK concert promoter

Simon James Moran is a concert promoter in the United Kingdom, managing director of SJM Concerts, director of the Academy Music Group of venues and owner of the Warrington Wolves Rugby League team. He is in charge of major London venues including the O2 Shepherd's Bush Empire and O2 Brixton Academy.

In 2011, The Guardian credited Simon Moran as the catalyst for Take That reforming in 2005, after he offered to promote a comeback tour. The band "heaped praise on music mogul Simon Moran" at the BRIT Awards 2008, for his work arranging their sell-out tour.

Promoted by Moran, Take That's Progress Live in 2011 tour was the biggest live tour in UK and Irish history.

SJM Concerts promotes tours by many well-known artists, including Morrissey, Spice Girls and The Killers and the company's management arm, SJM Management manages the careers of The Script, The Coral, and Paul Heaton.

Simon Moran is also a board member of the Academy Music Group, which owns and runs venues including Carling Brixton Academy, Shepherd's Bush Empire, and Carling Academies in Birmingham, Liverpool, Bristol, Newcastle, Sheffield, Leeds and Glasgow.

Moran is a shareholder in a joint-venture label with Gary Barlow, Future Records.

SJM Ltd is a company with a registered office in Manchester, England, UK.

== Honours ==
In 2011, The Guardian named Simon Moran as No 9 in the Music Power 100. In the same year he was listed by the Evening Standard as one of London's 1000 most influential people in the Pop & Rock category.

Simon Moran was also referenced as the "most influential music executive of the Noughties."

In 2003, he was honoured at Music Manager Forum's (MMF) Roll of Honour, which took place at London's Park Lane Hilton hotel. He was named manager of the year and dedicated his award to Jo Strummer, whom he worked with for five years.

Simon Moran and SJM Concerts won the Music Week award as best UK promoter in 2007, 2008, 2010, 2011, 2013 (it didn't run in 2012) On 16 July 2013, Moran was awarded an Honorary Doctorate in Music by his alma mater, the University of Sheffield.

== Outside the music industry ==
In 2003, Moran bought rugby league club, Warrington Wolves. Since then, he has seen the team rise to upper tier of the Super League and win back-to-back Challenge Cup crowns in 2009 & 2010, the League Leader's Shield in 2011 and 2016 and the Challenge Cup in 2012 and 2019. Moran led the team out at Wembley Stadium.

== See also ==
- List of Super League rugby league club owners
- List of owners of English football clubs
