= Chris Hankinson =

English rugby league footballer

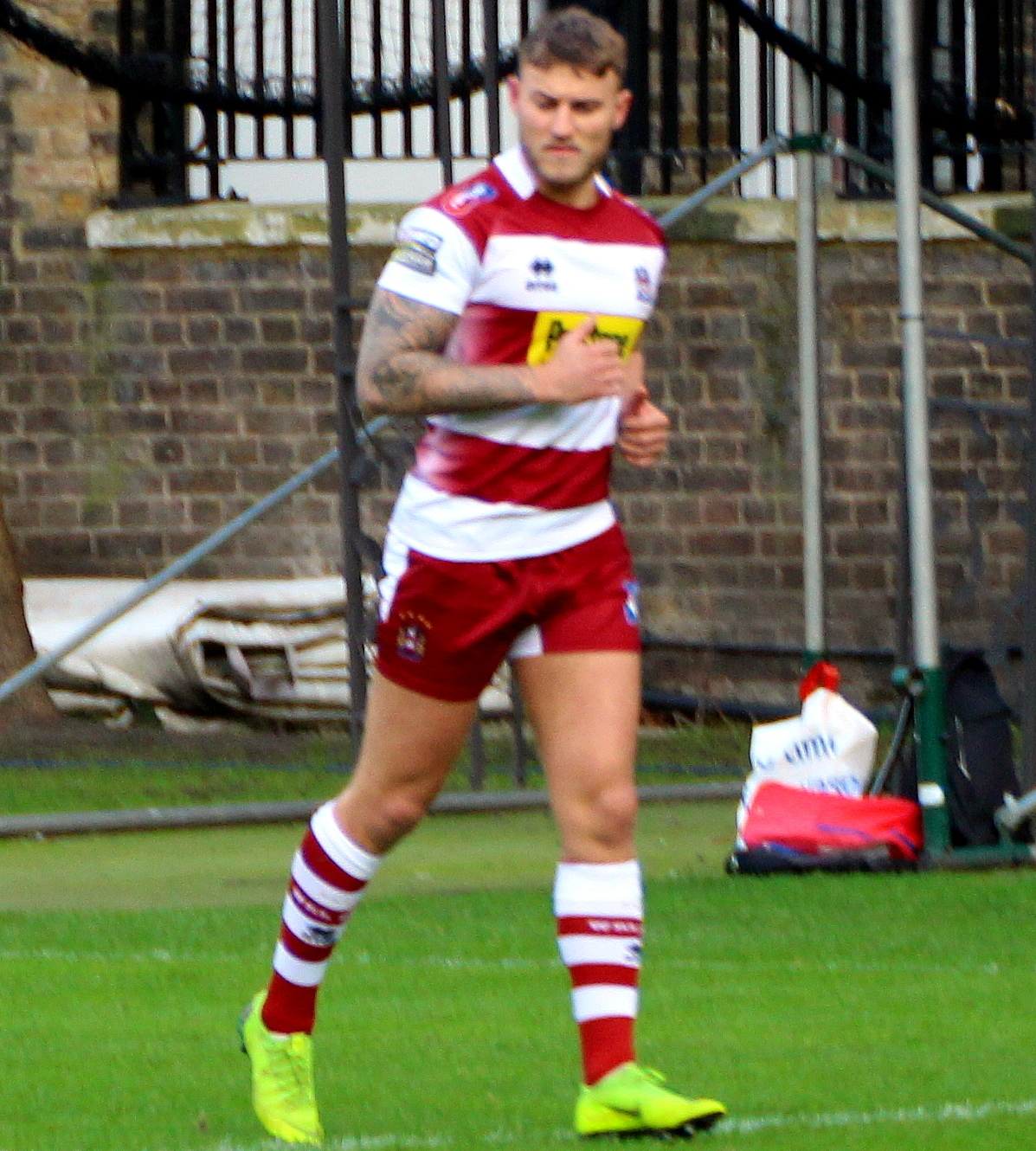

Personal information
- Full name: Christopher Hankinson
- Born: 30 November 1993 (age 32) Wigan, Greater Manchester, England
- Height: 6 ft 1 in (1.85 m)
- Weight: 14 st 11 lb (94 kg)

Playing information
- Position: Centre
Club
Years	Team	Pld	T	G	FG	P
2014–16	Leigh Centurions	7	2	0	0	8
2015(loan)	→ Barrow Raiders	25	10	10	0	60
2016(loan)	→ Barrow Raiders	24	14	88	0	228
2017–18	Swinton Lions	51	15	83	1	227
2018–21	Wigan Warriors	23	3	19	0	50
2019(loan)	→ Swinton Lions	8	1	2	0	8
2021(loan)	→ London Broncos	19	10	83	0	206
2022	Toulouse Olympique	25	5	64	0	148
2023	Featherstone Rovers	18	7	18	0	64
2024–25	Salford Red Devils	36	8	19	0	70
2025–	Leeds Rhinos	29	10	7	0	54
	Total	265	85	393	1	1123
Representative
Years	Team	Pld	T	G	FG	P
2016	Cumbria	1	0	2	0	4
- Source: As of 8 August 2026

Chris Hankinson (born 30 November 1993) is a professional rugby league footballer who plays as a centre for the Leeds Rhinos in the Super League.

He has also played for Wigan Warriors, Toulouse Olympique and Salford Red Devils in the Super League, Leigh Centurions, Swinton Lions, London Broncos and Featherstone Rovers in the Championship, the Barrow Raiders in Championship 1 and League 1, and Swinton Lions and London Broncos in the Championship. Hankinson has spent time on loan from Wigan at Swinton in the Betfred Championship. He has also played for Cumbria.

== Background ==
Hankinson was born in Wigan, Greater Manchester, England.

He is a qualified electrician and personal trainer.

== Career ==
=== Early career ===
Hankinson played his junior at the Hindley ARLFC. He was in the junior systems of the Salford City Reds, but did not progress through to the first team.

=== Leigh Centurions ===
He left Salford to begin his professional career at the Leigh Centurions. He made his debut for Leigh in 2014.

He was sent on loan by the Centurions to the Barrow Raiders, playing for the Cumbrian club throughout the 2015 Championship 1 season.

Leigh sent him to the Barrow the following year, spending the entire 2016 League 1 season in Cumbria.

=== Swinton Lions ===
Hanksinson moved from Leigh to the Swinton Lions in the Championship ahead of the 2017 season.

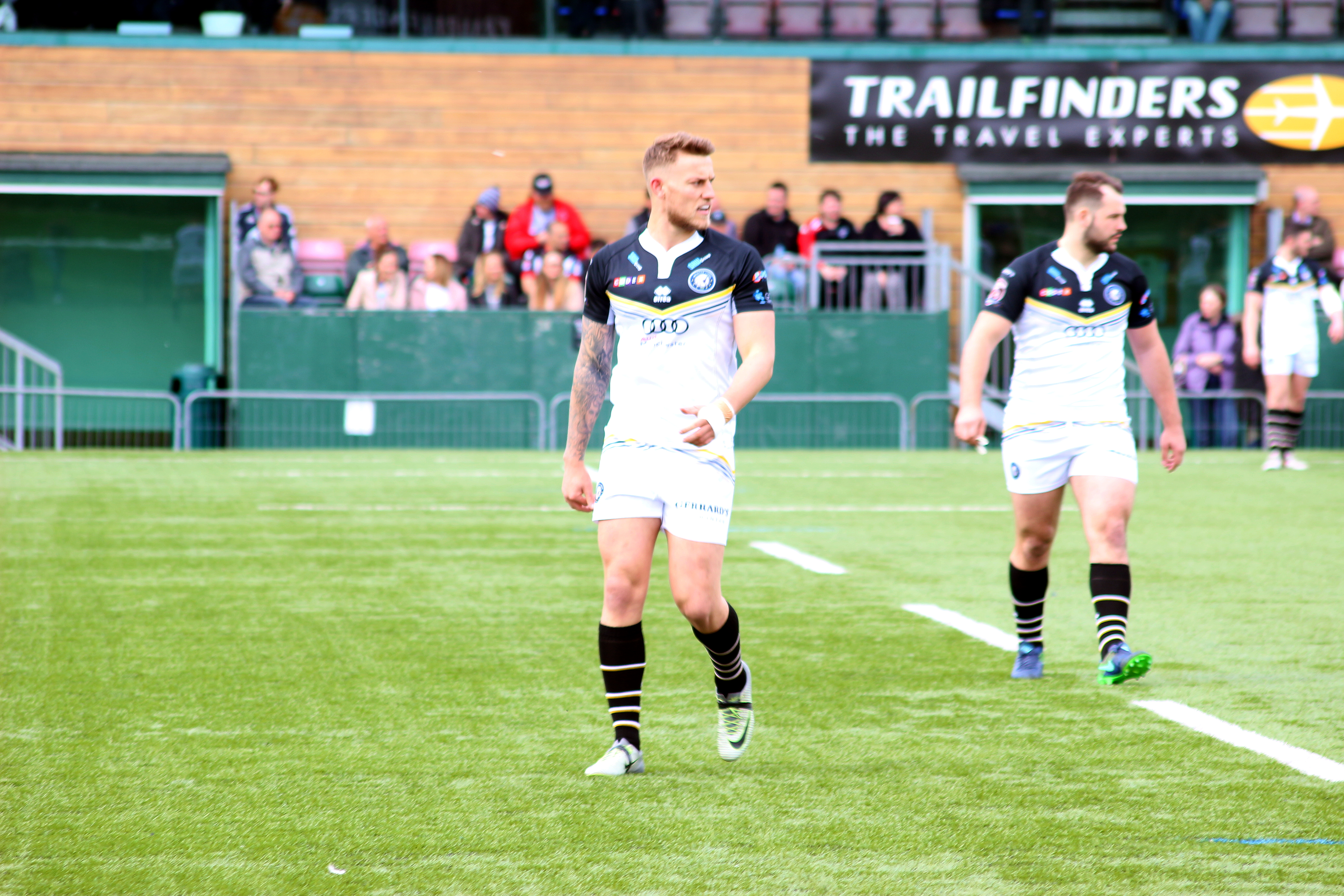
Hankinson playing for the Swinton Lions in 2017

=== Wigan Warriors ===
He moved to his hometown club in July 2018, and he made his Super League début for Wigan in the derby against St Helens.

He spent part of 2019 on loan at his former club Swinton, featuring in eight matches in the Championship.

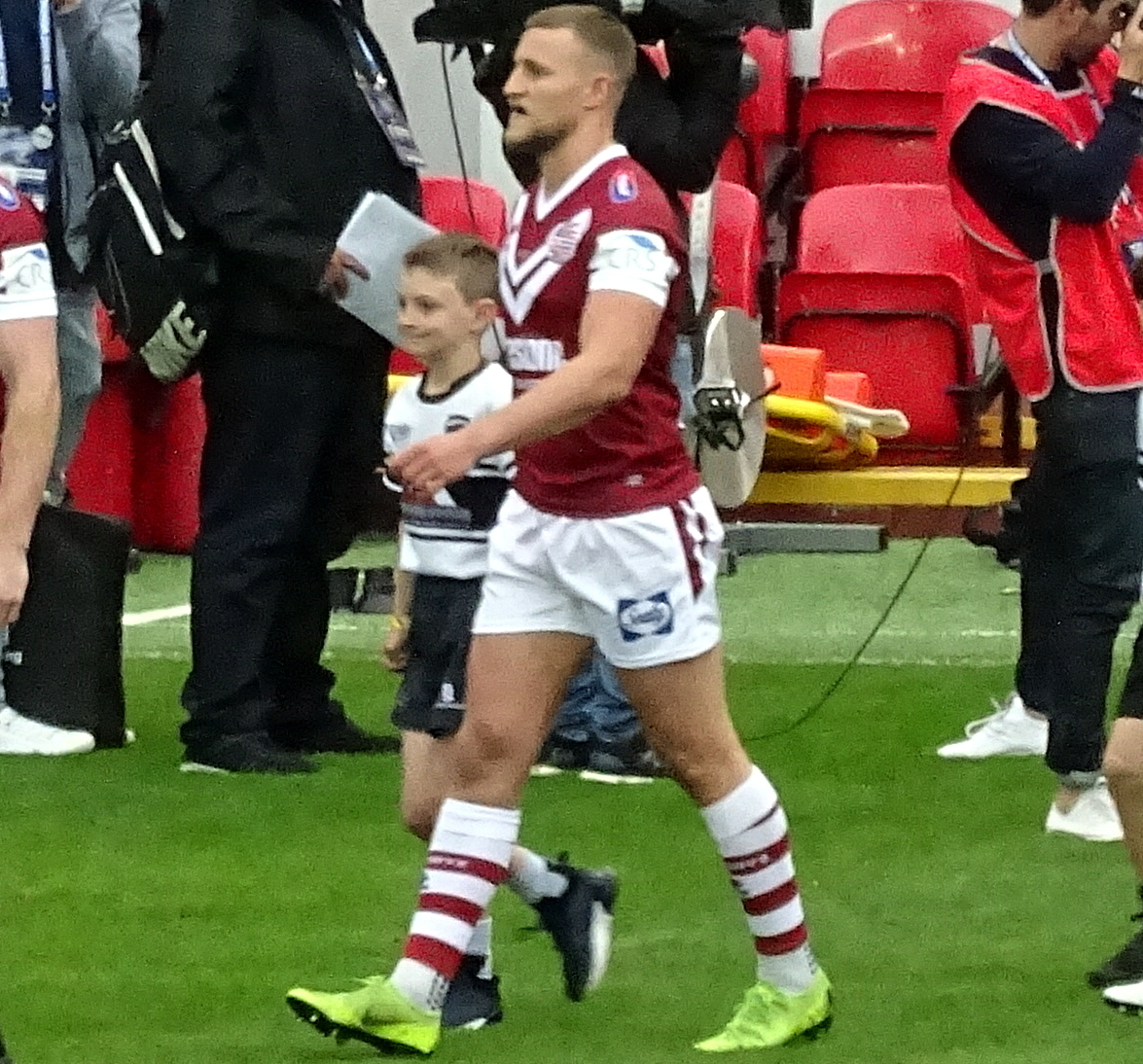
Hankinson taking the field for Wigan at Anfield in May 2019

He won a League Leaders medal with Wigan in 2020.

=== London Broncos ===
On 31 December 2020 it was announced that he had signed for the London Broncos for the 2021 season.

=== Toulouse Olympique ===
On 9 November it was announced that Hankinson had left Wigan and signed for Toulouse Olympique on a two-year deal. He will become the third goal-kicker at Toulouse alongside Mark Kheirallah and Anthony Marion.

=== Featherstone Rovers ===
On 17 October 2022 it was announced that Hankinson had signed for Featherstone for the 2023 season.

=== Salford Red Devils ===
On 8 December 2023, it was reported that he had signed for Salford in the Super League on a two-year deal.

=== Leeds Rhinos ===
On 4 August 2025 it was reported that he had signed for Leeds Rhinos in the Super League

On 14 November 2025 Leeds Rhinos announced that he had been handed another 1-year contract to continue at the club for the 2026 season

== Club statistics ==
Year	Club	Competition	Appearances	Tries	Goals	Drop goals	Points
2014	Leigh Centurions	Championship	7	2	0	0	8
2015	Leigh Centurions	Championship	0	0	0	0	0
2015	Barrow Raiders	Championship 1	24	9	10	0	56
2016	Leigh Centurions	Championship	0	0	0	0	0
2016	Barrow Raiders	League 1	24	14	100	0	256
2017	Swinton Lions	Championship	31	9	31	0	98
2018	Swinton Lions	Championship	20	6	52	1	129
2018	Wigan Warriors	Super League	2	1	0	0	4
2019	Wigan Warriors	Super League	18	2	16	0	40
2019	Swinton Lions	Championship	8	1	2	0	8
2020	Wigan Warriors	Super League	3	0	3	0	6
2021	Wigan Warriors	Super League	0	0	0	0	0
2021	London Broncos	Championship	19	10	83	0	206
2022	Toulouse Olympique	Super League	25	5	64	0	148
2023	Featherstone Rovers	Championship	18	7	18	0	64
2024	Salford Red Devils	Super League	21	5	0	0	20
2025	Salford Red Devils	Super League	15	3	19	0	50
2025	Leeds Rhinos	Super League	8	2	1	0	10
2026	Leeds Rhinos	Super League					
Club career total:			244	77	387	1	1,079
