= Matt Arthur =

Australian rugby league footballer

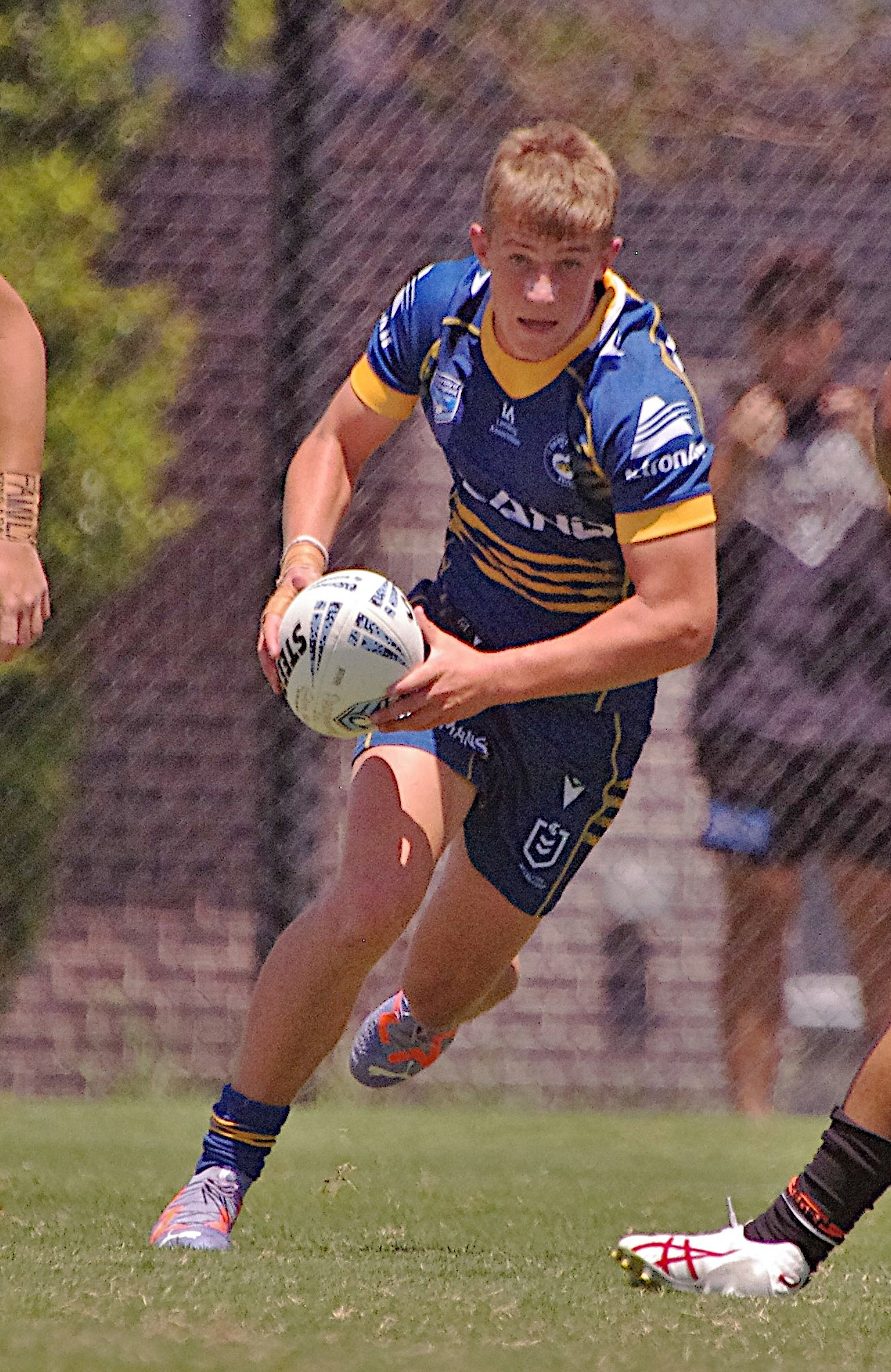

Personal information
- Full name: Matthew Arthur
- Born: 4 February 2005 (age 21) Cairns, Queensland, Australia
- Height: 175 cm (5 ft 9 in)
- Weight: 83 kg (13 st 1 lb)

Playing information
- Position: Hooker
Club
Years	Team	Pld	T	G	FG	P
2024	Parramatta Eels	3	0	0	0	0
2025–	Newcastle Knights	2	0	0	0	0
	Total	5	0	0	0	0
- Source: As of 17 August 2025
- Education: Patrician Brothers' College, Blacktown
- Father: Brad Arthur
- Relatives: Jake Arthur (brother)

Matthew Arthur (born 4 February 2005) is an Australian professional rugby league footballer who plays as a hooker for the Newcastle Knights in the National Rugby League.

He previously played for the Parramatta Eels in the NRL.

== Background ==
Arthur attended Patrician Brothers' College, Blacktown. Arthur came through the grades at Parramatta in Harold Matthews Cup and S.G. Ball Cup, being a part of the 2023 SG Ball winning team.

He is the son of former Eels head coach Brad Arthur, and the younger brother of fellow rugby league player Jake Arthur. He played his junior rugby league at Rouse Hill Rhinos.

== Playing career ==
=== 2024 ===
In 2024, Arthur started the year as starting Hooker for Parramatta in NSW Cup. He played for New South Wales at under-19 level where he co-captained, scoring a try leading to a 14–10 victory in the 2024 under-19 State of Origin.

In round 17 of the 2024 NRL season, Arthur made his first grade debut for the Parramatta Eels in their 34–26 loss against the Newcastle Knights playing at hooker. On 24 July 2024, Arthur was told by Parramatta he was free to negotiate with other clubs after the player requested a release from his contract. Parramatta CEO Jim Sarantinos stated “Matt is a great young man and it was wonderful to see him make his NRL debut earlier this year. While we would love to see him stay at the Eels, we understand the unique circumstances involved with this request and our decision to grant permission to negotiate with other clubs is based on compassionate grounds".

In August, it was reported that Arthur signed a 3-year contract with the Newcastle Knights, starting in 2025.
