= Cooper Jenkins =

Australian rugby league player

Personal information
- Full name: Cooper Jenkins
- Born: 11 July 2001 (age 25) Newcastle, New South Wales, Australia
- Height: 6 ft 4 in (1.93 m)
- Weight: 17 st 0 lb (108 kg)

Playing information
- Position: Prop, Second-row
Club
Years	Team	Pld	T	G	FG	P
2025–	Leeds Rhinos	53	7	0	0	28
- Source: As of 01 March 2026

Cooper Jenkins (born 11 July 2001) is an Australian rugby league footballer who plays as a prop for the Leeds Rhinos in the Super League.

== Playing career ==
=== Newcastle Knights ===
He came through the Newcastle Knights development programme, he was originally a centre due his speed, winning a national title for 200m. As he matured he moved into the forwards, he featured for Newcastle Knights Reserves in the New South Wales Cup. In 2019 he featured for the Australian under-18 side against New Zealand under-18.

=== Norths Devils ===
After spending some time training with National Rugby League side Dolphins, he moved to Norths Devils in the Queensland Cup, where they won the competition, beating the Redcliffe Dolphins 34–20. Before going on to beat the Newton Jets to win the NRL State Championship.

=== Leeds Rhinos ===
In 2025 he moved to England, joining Super League side Leeds Rhinos, his first appearance came in the third round of the 2025 Challenge Cup, starting in a 0–92 win over amateur side Wests Warriors.

== Statistics ==
Season	Team	Matches	T	G	GK %	F/G	Pts
2021	Newcastle Knights Reserves	4	2	0	—	0	8
2022	Newcastle Knights Reserves	2	0	0	—	0	0
2023	Newcastle Knights Reserves	16	1	0	—	0	4
2024	Norths Devils	19	7	0	—	0	28
2025	Leeds Rhinos	22	1	0			
2026	Leeds Rhinos	9	5	0	—	0	20
Career totals		54	10	0	—	0	40
