= Alfie Edgell =

English professional rugby league footballer

Personal information
- Full name: Alfie Edgell
- Born: 25 July 2004 (age 21) Kippax, West Yorkshire, England
- Height: 5 ft 11 in (1.81 m)
- Weight: 14 st 0 lb (89 kg)

Playing information
- Position: Fullback, Wing
Club
| Years | Team | Pld | T | G | FG | P |
|---|---|---|---|---|---|---|
| 2023– | Leeds Rhinos | 25 | 10 | 0 | 0 | 40 |
- Source: As of 26 February 2026

Alfie Edgell (born 25 July 2004) is an English professional rugby league footballer who plays as a fullback or winger for the Leeds Rhinos in the Betfred Super League.

== Background ==
Edgell played for Kippax Welfare ARLFC as a junior.

== Career ==
Edgell made his Leeds debut in the Super League against the Castleford Tigers in 2023.
