= Lachie Miller =

Australian rugby league player

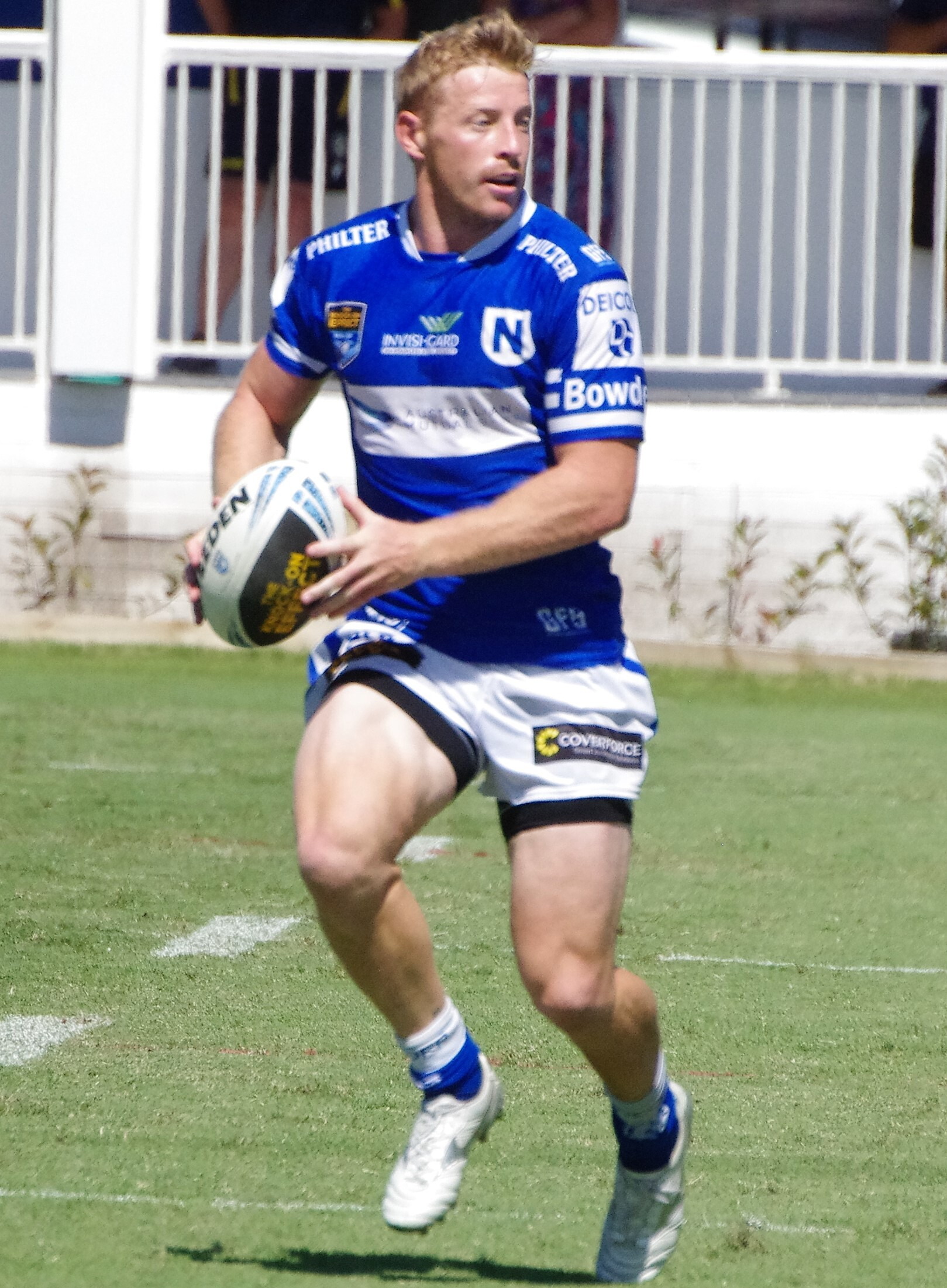

Personal information
- Full name: Lachlan Miller
- Born: 14 August 1994 (age 32) Coffs Harbour, New South Wales, Australia
- Height: 5 ft 11 in (1.80 m)
- Weight: 14 st 2 lb (90 kg)

Playing information

Rugby union
Representative
Years	Team	Pld	T	G	FG	P
2020–21	Australia Sevens	5	1

Rugby league
- Position: Fullback
Club
Years	Team	Pld	T	G	FG	P
2022	Cronulla Sharks	7	3	0	0	12
2023	Newcastle Knights	12	2	26	0	60
2024–	Leeds Rhinos	74	20	18	0	116
	Total	93	25	44	0	188
- Source: As of 1 September 2026

Lachlan Miller (born 14 August 1994) is an Australian rugby league footballer who plays as a fullback for the Leeds Rhinos in the Super League.

He previously played for the Cronulla-Sutherland Sharks and Newcastle Knights in the National Rugby League.

== Playing career ==
=== Rugby sevens ===
Miller was a member of the Australian men's rugby sevens' squad at the Tokyo 2020 Olympics. The team came third in their pool round and then lost to Fiji 19-nil in the quarterfinal.

=== 2022 ===
In round 11 of the 2022 NRL season, Miller made his first grade debut for Cronulla and scored a try in the clubs 25-18 victory over the Gold Coast. In round 21 of the season, Miller came off the bench and played in the centres, replacing Siosifa Talakai in the Sharks 24-18 win over the Dragons. In this game he managed a game high 6 tackle breaks. Miller played for Cronulla in their elimination final loss to South Sydney.

=== 2023 ===
In January, Miller was released from his Cronulla contract to sign a three-year deal with the Newcastle Knights.

In round 1 of the 2023 NRL season, Miller made his Newcastle debut in the club's 12-20 loss to the New Zealand Warriors. In round 3, Miller scored two tries for Newcastle in their 36-20 loss against the Dolphins. Miller served as Newcastle’s primary fullback to start the season, and after five rounds he led the league in tackle-busts and was top-five in average run metres. Despite his career-best form to start to the season, Miller later struggled to find consistency and by round 13 was relegated to a bench role as Newcastle star Kalyn Ponga returned to his familiar fullback position.

On 23 August, Miller was released from the final two years of his Newcastle contract, so he could sign a three-year deal to join English side Leeds starting in 2024.

=== 2024 ===
Miller played 26 matches for Leeds in the 2024 Super League season and scored seven tries as the club finished 8th on the table and missed the playoffs.

=== 2025 ===
Miller played 25 games for Leeds in the 2025 Super League season including the clubs heart breaking 16-14 loss against St Helens in the elimination playoff match.

== Statistics ==
Season	Team	Matches	T	G	GK %	F/G	Pts
2022	Cronulla-Sutherland	7	3	0	—	0	12
2023	Newcastle Knights	11	2	26			60
2024	Leeds Rhinos	26	7				28
2025	Leeds Rhinos	16	6	14			24
Career totals		60	18	40	—		124
