= Morgan Gannon =

English rugby league footballer

Personal information
- Full name: Morgan Gannon
- Born: 2 December 2003 (age 22) Halifax, West Yorkshire, England
- Height: 6 ft 3 in (1.91 m)
- Weight: 15 st 13 lb (101 kg)

Playing information
- Position: Second-row, Lock
Club
Years	Team	Pld	T	G	FG	P
2021–25	Leeds Rhinos	73	14	0	0	56
2026	New Zealand Warriors	3	0	0	0	0
2027–	Leeds Rhinos	0	0	0	0	0
	Total	76	14	0	0	56
Representative
Years	Team	Pld	T	G	FG	P
2021	England Knights	1	0	0	0	0
- Source: As of 13 September 2026
- Father: Jim Gannon

Morgan Gannon (born 2 December 2003) is an English professional rugby league footballer who plays as a second-row forward for the Leeds Rhinos in the Super League.

He will play for the Leeds Rhinos from 2027 onwards.

== Background ==
Gannon was born in Halifax, West Yorkshire, England. His brother Jacob Gannon played for the Warrington Wolves in the Super League and they are both sons of former player Jim Gannon.

He played his junior rugby league for Siddal.

== Playing career ==
=== Leeds Rhinos ===
In 2021 he made professional début for Leeds against St Helens in the 2021 Challenge Cup.

=== New Zealand Warriors ===
On 26 April 2025, Gannon signed a three-year contract beginning in 2026 with the New Zealand Warriors of the NRL.

Gannon made his debut in a 38–12 win over the Newcastle Knights on 21 March 2026 in Newcastle, Australia.

=== Leeds Rhinos (re-join) ===
On 19 June 2026 it was reported that he had re-joined Leeds Rhinos in the Super League on a 3-year deal.
