= James McDonnell (rugby league) =

Ireland international rugby league footballer

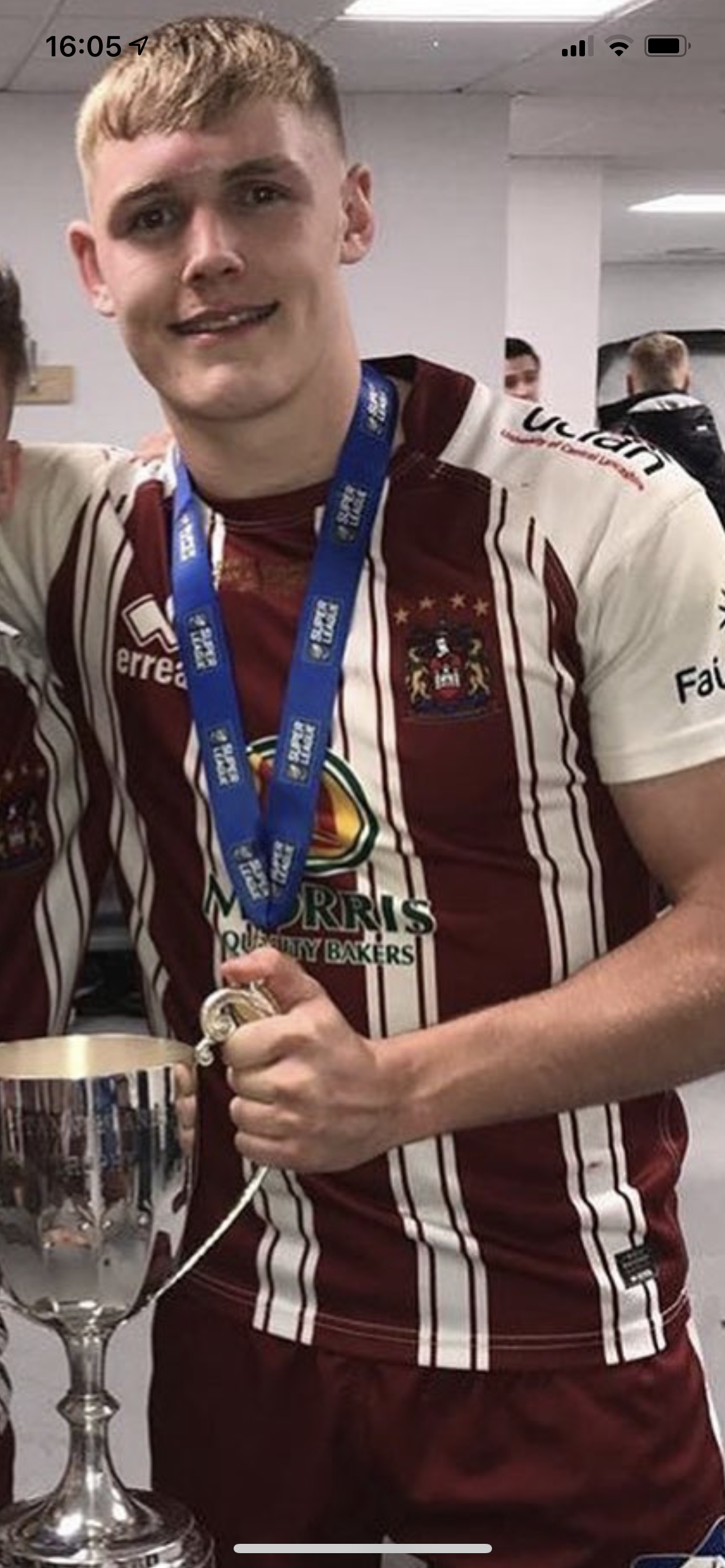

Personal information
- Full name: James McDonnell
- Born: 12 January 2000 (age 26) Wigan, Greater Manchester, England
- Height: 6 ft 2 in (1.87 m)
- Weight: 15 st 10 lb (100 kg)

Playing information
- Position: Centre, Second-row
Club
Years	Team	Pld	T	G	FG	P
2020–22	Wigan Warriors	6	2	0	0	8
2021(loan)	→ York City Knights	7	0	0	0	0
2022(DR)	→ Leigh Centurions	17	7	0	0	28
2023–26	Leeds Rhinos	103	27	0	0	108
2027–	Perth Bears	0	0	0	0	0
	Total	133	36	0	0	144
Representative
Years	Team	Pld	T	G	FG	P
2022–	Ireland	1	1	0	0	4
- Source: As of 20 October 2026

James McDonnell (born 12 January 2000) is an Ireland international rugby league footballer who plays as a second-row forward for the Perth Bears in the NRL.

== Background ==
McDonnell played his amateur rugby league for Wigan St Judes.

== Club career ==
=== Wigan Warriors ===
McDonnell made his Super League debut in round 14 of the 2020 Super League season for the Warriors against St Helens where Wigan went on to lose 42–0 against a much more experienced St Helens squad. McDonnell started the match playing at centre and became Wigan Warriors player #1106.

==== York City Knights (loan) ====
On 14 May 2021 it was reported that he had signed for the York City Knights in the RFL Championship on one-month loan.

==== Leigh Centurions (DR) ====
McDonnell spent the 2022 season on dual registration with Leigh Centurions.

=== Leeds ===
McDonnell played 23 matches for Leeds in the 2023 Super League season as the club finished 8th on the table and missed the playoffs. McDonnell played 25 games for Leeds in the 2024 Super League which saw the club finish 8th on the table.

=== Perth Bears ===
On 12 January 2026 it was reported that McDonnell had signed with the Perth Bears on a two-year deal at the end of the 2026 season.

== International career ==
McDonnell received his first international call up for the England Knights in early 2022. Later that year he was called up to represent Ireland in the 2021 Rugby League World Cup.
