= Presley Cassell =

English professional rugby league footballer

Personal information
- Full name: Presley Cassell
- Born: 6 October 2006 (age 19) Halifax, West Yorkshire, England

Playing information
- Position: Loose forward, Prop
Club
Years	Team	Pld	T	G	FG	P
2025–	Leeds Rhinos	9	2	0	0	8
2026(loan)	→ Hunslet	1	0	0	0	0
2026(loan)	→ Huddersfield Giants	1	0	0	0	0
	Total	11	2	0	0	8
- Source: As of 1 August 2026

Presley Cassell (born 6 October 2006) is an English professional rugby league footballer who plays as a loose forward or prop for the Leeds Rhinos.

He previously played for Hunslet in the RFL Championship on loan from Leeds.

== Background ==
Cassell was born Halifax, West Yorkshire, England.

He played junior and youth rugby for Ovenden and Siddal, as well as Bradford club West Bowling. He has played for England at Academy level.

== Career ==
=== Leeds Rhinos ===
Cassell made his Leeds Rhinos debut in the Super League against the Salford Red Devils in 2025.

=== Hunslet RLFC (loan) ===
On 5 March 2026 it was reported that he had signed for Hunslet in the RFL Championship on a one-week loan.

=== Huddersfield Giants (loan) ===
On 17 March 2026 it was reported that he had signed for Huddersfield Giants in the Super League on loan
