= Brad Arthur =

Australian rugby league coach

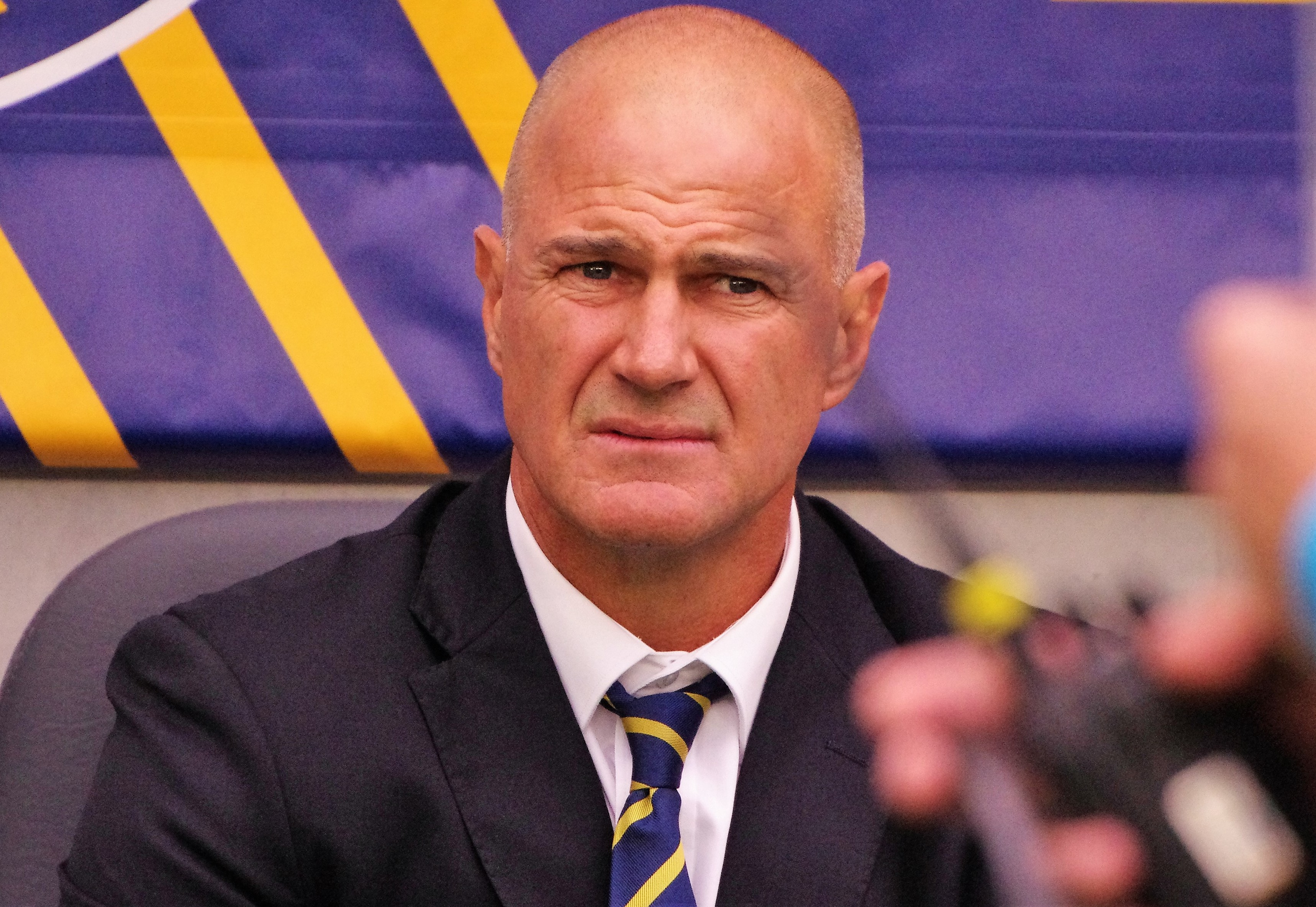

Personal information
- Full name: Bradley Arthur
- Born: 21 May 1974 (age 52) Sydney, New South Wales, Australia

Coaching information
Club
| Years | Team | Gms | W | D | L | W% |
| 2012 | Parramatta Eels | 6 | 2 | 0 | 4 | 33 |
| 2014–24 | Parramatta Eels | 258 | 135 | 0 | 123 | 52 |
| 2024– | Leeds Rhinos | 70 | 45 | 0 | 25 | 64 |
| | Total | 334 | 182 | 0 | 152 | 54 |
- Source: As of 22 November 2026
- Relatives: Matt Arthur (son); Jake Arthur (son)

Bradley Arthur (born 21 May 1974) is a professional rugby league coach who is the head coach of the Leeds Rhinos in the Super League.

He was the head coach of the Parramatta Eels in the NRL for over a decade, as well as the caretaker coach at the Eels for the final six games of the 2012 NRL season.

== Background ==
Arthur was born in Sydney, New South Wales, Australia.

His two sons Jakob Arthur and Matthew Arthur play for the Newcastle Knights in the National Rugby League.

== Playing career ==
Arthur was a Parramatta Eels junior and played in the S. G. Ball Cup and Under-21s for the club. He then moved to the Penrith Panthers where Royce Simmons advised him he would never make first grade.

== Coaching career ==
=== Parramatta Eels ===
In 1997 Arthur, aged only 23, accepted a job as a captain-coach of the Batemans Bay Tigers. In his first season the club didn't win a match; however, the club made the finals in their second year. Arthur then was the captain-coach of the Cairns Brothers club for eight seasons, leading the club to four premierships and six grand finals. In 2007 he was appointed the Melbourne Storm's NRL Development Coach. The side won the competition that year. In 2008 he was appointed the Melbourne Storm's inaugural Toyota Cup (Under-20s) coach. The side won the 2009 Grand Final. In 2010 he was promoted to an assistant coach in Melbourne alongside Stephen Kearney.

In 2011, he was appointed the assistant coach of the Parramatta Eels, following the appointment of Kearney as head coach. Kearney was fired in 2012 with six games remaining and Arthur was appointed the caretaker coach. Following the appointment of Ricky Stuart as head coach for 2013, Arthur was informed that he would not be retained as an assistant coach.

Starting in 2013, Arthur was appointed as the assistant coach to Geoff Toovey at the Manly Warringah Sea Eagles. As of 16 October 2013, Arthur accepted a three-year deal to join the Parramatta Eels as head coach. After being announced as the new head coach Arthur told the media that there would be "No more wooden spoons" under his tenure. In response to one of the reporters Arthur said "Yeah, well we won’t be getting three ... we definitely won't be getting three wooden spoons".

In his first season as head coach, Arthur led Parramatta to 10th place on the ladder in The 2014 NRL Season. With two games to go in the regular season, Parramatta needed to win one game out of the remaining two fixtures to qualify but lost to Newcastle and Canberra (who were both lower on the ladder) respectively. Parramatta missed the top 8 by two competition points. In 2015, Parramatta missed out on the finals by finishing 12th.

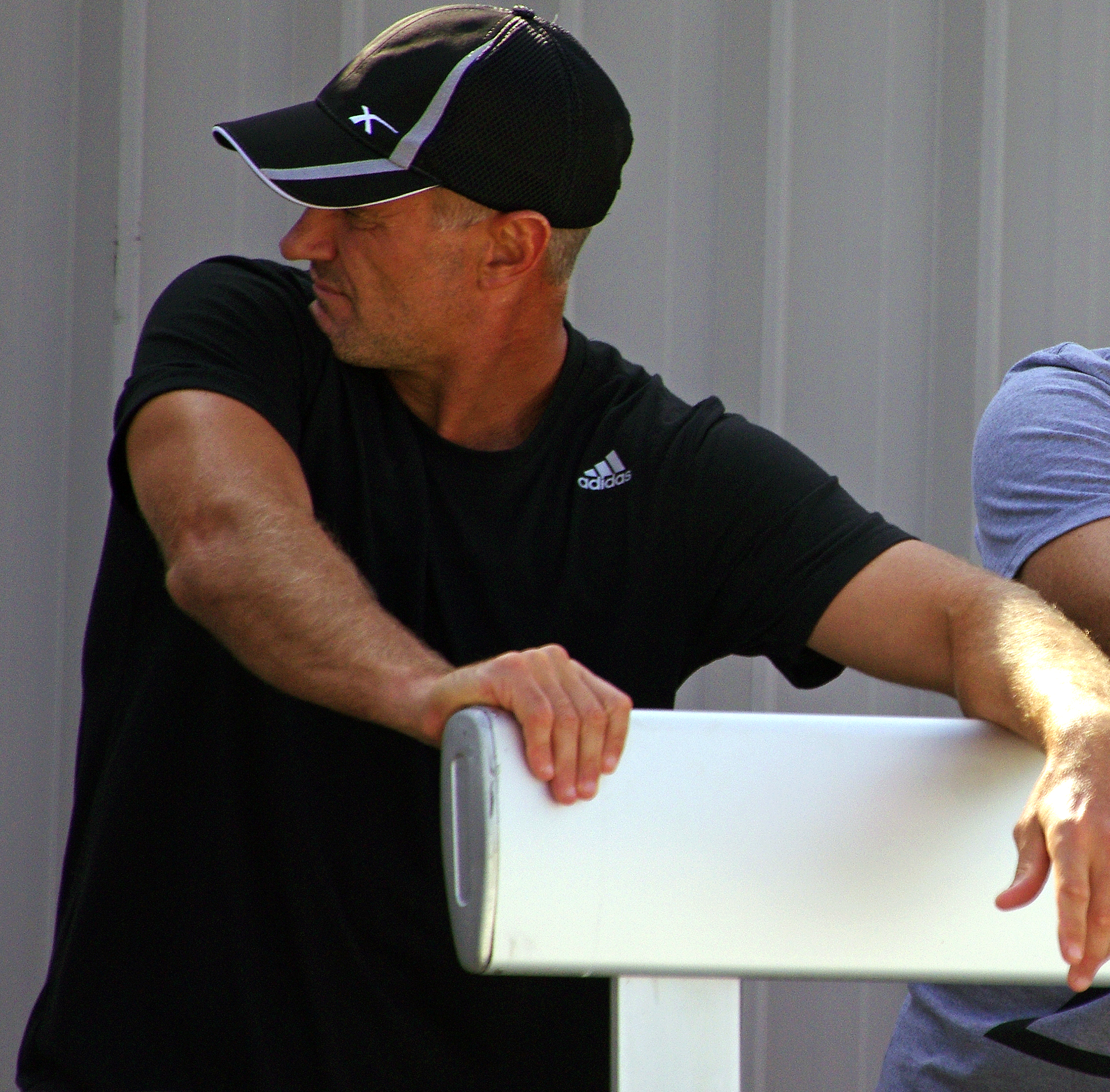
Arthur in 2016

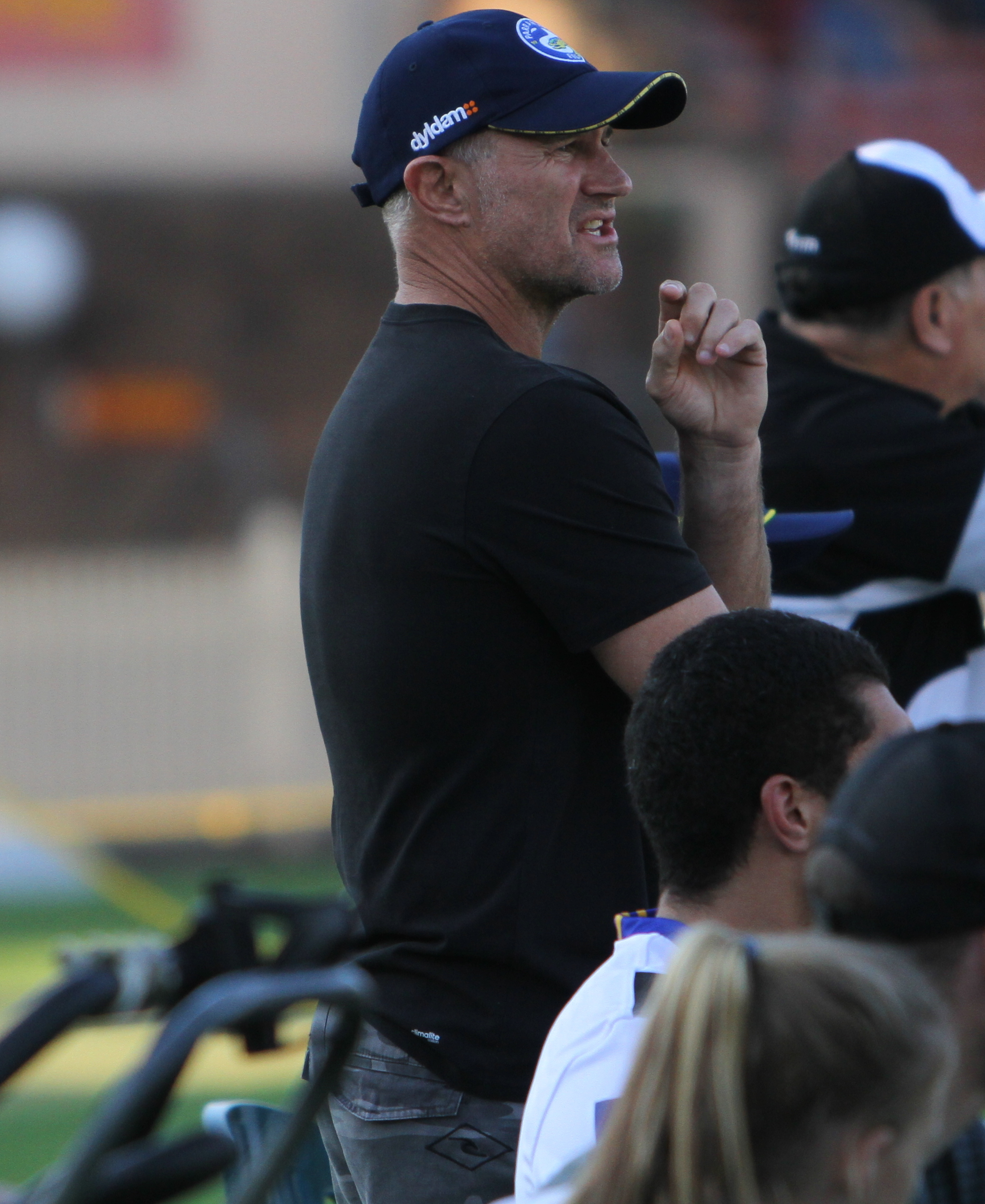
Arthur in 2016

In 2016, Arthur was at the forefront of the salary cap scandal which rocked the club but was praised by the media and the players for his leadership skills and managing to keep the team together. Parramatta finished the season in 14th position but would have had enough points to qualify for the finals if not for the 12-point deduction handed to the club for breaching the salary cap.

In the 2017 season, Arthur guided Parramatta to their first finals series since 2009 with the club finishing fourth on the premiership ladder. Even though Parramatta then went on to lose both their finals matches, Arthur was praised for his performances as coach. In 2018, Arthur led Parramatta to the club's 14th wooden spoon claiming only 6 wins all season. Arthur claimed responsibility for the season and the board admitted he would see out his contract which was due to end in 2019.

At the start of the 2019 NRL season, Arthur guided Parramatta to consecutive victories over Penrith and rivals Canterbury-Bankstown in the opening rounds of the competition. In Round 6, Parramatta defeated Wests Tigers 51–6 in the opening NRL game at the new Western Sydney Stadium. It was then revealed by the club that talks had begun in relation to Arthur's future at the club. In Round 9 of the competition, Parramatta were defeated 64–10 by Melbourne at Suncorp Stadium. The following week on 14 May 2019, Arthur was given a two-year contract extension keeping him as head coach of the club until the end of the 2021 season.

Between round 12 and round 22 of the 2019 NRL season, Arthur guided Parramatta to win 8 of their next 10 matches. Parramatta confirmed their spot in the 2019 finals series with a 36–12 win over the last placed Gold Coast side. In round 25 against the Manly Sea Eagles, Parramatta won the match 32–16 which saw the club leapfrog Manly into 5th to finish the 2019 regular season.

In week one of the 2019 finals series, Arthur guided Parramatta to a 58–0 victory over the Brisbane Broncos at the new Western Sydney Stadium in the elimination final. The victory was the biggest win by a team in finals history eclipsing Newtown's 55–7 victory over St George in 1944. The following week in the elimination final against Melbourne, Parramatta were defeated 32–0 at AAMI Park which ended their season.

At the start of the 2020 NRL season, Arthur guided Parramatta to four consecutive victories which put the club on top of the table. It was Parramatta's best start to a season since 1989. The following week, Arthur guided Parramatta to victory over Penrith. The result meant it was Parramatta's best start to a season since 1986. At the end of the 2020 regular season, Arthur guided Parramatta to a third-placed finish on the table. It was the club's highest place on the table since the Parramatta Minor Premiership team of 2005. In the 2020 finals series, Parramatta would once again be eliminated in consecutive weeks. They lost to Melbourne in week one of the finals 36–24 after being up 12–0 early on in the game. The following week they lost to South Sydney in the elimination final 38–24 after being up 18–8 at half-time. Arthur also set an unwanted coaching record, becoming the first head coach in 112 seasons of the game to coach a side for seven consecutive years and fail to make at least one preliminary final.

In the 2021 NRL season, Arthur guided Parramatta to a sixth-placed finish on the table. The club made the second week of the finals but were once again eliminated from the competition at that stage losing 8–6 against Penrith. On 8 October 2021, Arthur re-signed with Parramatta until the end of 2024. In the 2022 NRL season, Arthur guided Parramatta to fourth place on the table which meant they qualified for the finals. Parramatta would lose in the opening week of the finals against Penrith before defeating Canberra the following week to book the club a place in the preliminary finals for the first time since 2009. Parramatta would go on to upset North Queensland in Townsville to reach the 2022 NRL Grand Final. After going into half time at 18–0 down, Parramatta would lose the final 28–12. On 15 March 2023, Arthur signed a two-year contract extension to remain as Parramatta head coach until the end of the 2025 NRL season. At the conclusion of the 2023 NRL season, Parramatta finished in 10th place, missing the finals by two competition points.

On 20 May 2024, the Parramatta Eels announced that they had parted ways with Arthur after more than a decade as coach following the clubs 48–16 loss against Melbourne at Magic Round, the club had released in their statement that the assistant coach Trent Barrett would assume coaching duties for the rest of the season. Parramatta were currently 14th on the table with only three wins at the time of Arthur's termination. The sacking also occurred one day before Arthur's 50th birthday.

=== Leeds Rhinos ===
On 10 July 2024, Arthur was confirmed as the new head coach for English Super League club Leeds. Arthur would manage to record five wins from his ten games in charge of Leeds as they finished 8th on the table and missed the playoffs. On 11 August 2025, it was announced that Arthur had signed a contract with Leeds keeping him at the club until the end of 2026. In the 2025 Super League season, Arthur guided Leeds to 4th place on the table. Leeds would then go on to lose their elimination playoff match against St Helens in the most heart breaking of circumstances with St Helens scoring two tries in the final nine minutes to win 16–14 with the final try being scored after the full-time siren.

=== Statistics ===
Brad Arthur – coaching results by season
| Team | Year | Games | Wins | Draws | Losses | Win % | Finals |
|---|---|---|---|---|---|---|---|
| PAR | 2012* | 6 | 2 | 0 | 4 | 33% | Interim Head Coach, Finished 16th (out of 16) |
| PAR | 2014 | 24 | 12 | 0 | 12 | 50% | Finished 10th (out of 16) |
| PAR | 2015 | 24 | 9 | 0 | 15 | 38% | Finished 12th (out of 16) |
| PAR | 2016† | 24 | 13 | 0 | 11 | 54% | Finished 14th (out of 16) |
| PAR | 2017 | 26 | 16 | 0 | 10 | 62% | Lost 2017 NRL Semi-final against North Queensland Cowboys 16—24 |
| PAR | 2018 | 24 | 6 | 0 | 18 | 25% | Finished 16th (out of 16) |
| PAR | 2019 | 26 | 15 | 0 | 11 | 58% | Lost 2019 NRL Semi-final against Melbourne Storm 0—32 |
| PAR | 2020 | 22 | 15 | 0 | 7 | 68% | Lost 2020 NRL Semi-final against South Sydney Rabbitohs 24–38 |
| PAR | 2021 | 26 | 16 | 0 | 10 | 62% | Lost 2021 NRL Semi-final against Penrith Panthers 6–8 |
| PAR | 2022 | 28 | 18 | 0 | 10 | 64% | Lost 2022 NRL Grand Final against Penrith Panthers 28–12 |
| PAR | 2023 | 24 | 12 | 0 | 12 | 50% | Finished 10th (out of 17) |
| PAR | 2024 | 10 | 3 | 0 | 7 | 30% | (Dismissed on 20 May 2024 by club after round 11) |
| Career | | 264 | 137 | 0 | 127 | 52% | |

†-Parramatta were deducted 12 competition points and their for/against tally accumulated between rounds 1–9 of the 2016 season for gross long-term salary cap breaches

- -Arthur was named interim head coach for final 6 games of the 2012 NRL season, after Stephen Kearney was sacked. no premiership
