= Tom Holroyd =

England international rugby league footballer

Personal information
- Full name: Thomas Holroyd
- Born: 9 February 2001 (age 25) Wadsworth, West Yorkshire, England
- Height: 6 ft 2 in (1.88 m)
- Weight: 17 st 13 lb (114 kg)

Playing information
- Position: Prop
Club
Years	Team	Pld	T	G	FG	P
2018–	Leeds Rhinos	105	14	0	0	56
2020(loan)	→ Featherstone Rovers	3	0	0	0	0
2022(loan)	→ Bradford Bulls	1	0	0	0	0
	Total	109	14	0	0	56
Representative
Years	Team	Pld	T	G	FG	P
2023	England	1	0	0	0	0
- Source: As of 02 October 2026

Tom Holroyd (born 9 February 2001) is an English professional rugby league footballer who plays as a prop forward for the Leeds Rhinos in the Super League.

He has spent time on loan from Leeds at Featherstone Rovers in the Championship.

== Background ==
Holroyd was born in Pecket Well Park, Hebden Bridge, West Yorkshire, England.

He studied at Calder High School in West Yorkshire

== Career ==
=== Leeds Rhinos ===
In 2018 he made his Super League début for the Rhinos against St Helens.
