= Riley Lumb =

English rugby league footballer (born 2004)

Personal information
- Full name: Riley Lumb
- Born: 18 December 2004 (age 21) Castleford, West Yorkshire, England
- Height: 6 ft 2 in (1.87 m)
- Weight: 12 st 11 lb (81 kg)

Playing information
- Position: Wing
Club
Years	Team	Pld	T	G	FG	P
2025–	Leeds Rhinos	24	14	0	0	56
2024(DR)	→ Halifax Panthers	1	0	0	0	0
2025(loan)	→ Salford Red Devils	1	0	1	0	2
2026(loan)	→ Huddersfield Giants	1	0	0	0	0
2026(loan)	→ Hunslet	1	0	0	0	0
	Total	28	14	1	0	58
- Source: As of 23 August 2026

Riley Lumb (born 18 December 2004) is an English professional rugby league footballer who plays as a winger for the Leeds Rhinos in the Super League.

== Career ==
=== Leeds Rhinos ===
Lumb made his debut in round 9 of the 2024 Super League season for the Rhinos against Hull FC, scoring two tries.

=== Huddersfield Giants (loan) ===
On 17 March 2026 it was reported that he had signed for Huddersfield Giants in the Super League on loan

=== Hunslet RLFC (loan) ===
On 30 April 2026 it was reported that he had signed for Hunslet RLFC in the RFL Championship on loan
