= Max Simpson =

English rugby league player

Personal information
- Full name: Max Simpson
- Born: 24 July 2004 (age 21) Leeds, West Yorkshire, England
- Height: 6 ft 2 in (1.87 m)
- Weight: 14 st 5 lb (91 kg)

Playing information
- Position: Centre
Club
Years	Team	Pld	T	G	FG	P
2022–	Leeds Rhinos	7	0	0	0	0
- Source: As of 9 September 2022

Max Simpson (born 24 July 2004) is a rugby league footballer who plays as a centre for the Leeds Rhinos in the Super League.

In 2022 he made his professional debut for Leeds against the Castleford Tigers.
