= Leeds Rhinos =

English professional rugby league football club

Club information
- Full name: Leeds Rhinos Rugby League Football Club
- Nickname(s): The Rhinos; The Loiners
- Colours: Blue and Amber
- Founded: 1870; 156 years ago (as Leeds St John's)
- Website: therhinos.co.uk

Current details
- Ground: AMT Headingley Rugby Stadium (19,700)
- CEO: Jamie Jones-Buchanan
- Chairman: Paul Caddick
- Coach: Brad Arthur
- Captain: Ash Handley
- Competition: Super League
- 2026 season: 2nd (Eliminated in semi final)
- Current season

Uniforms
Home colours	Away colours

Records
- Championships: 11 (1961, 1969, 1972, 2004, 2007, 2008, 2009, 2011, 2012, 2015, 2017)
- Challenge Cups: 14 (1910, 1923, 1932, 1936, 1941, 1942, 1957, 1968, 1977, 1978, 1999, 2014, 2015, 2020)
- World Club Challenges: 3 (2005, 2008, 2012)
- Other honours: 37
- Most capped: 625 – (England) John Holmes
- Highest points scorer: 3,967 – (England) Kevin Sinfield

The Leeds Rhinos are a professional rugby league club in Leeds, West Yorkshire, England. The club play their home games at AMT Headingley Rugby Stadium and compete in the Super League, the top tier of British rugby league.

Leeds Rhinos have won the League Championship 11 times, Challenge Cup 14 times and World Club Challenge three times.

The club share long-standing West Yorkshire Derby rivalries with Bradford Bulls and Castleford Tigers as well as a traditional cross-city rivalry with Hunslet Rugby League. Leeds' traditional home colours are blue and amber shirts with white shorts and blue socks.

== History ==
=== 1870–1895: Foundation and early years ===
In 1864, H. I. Jenkinson placed an advert in the Leeds Mercury inviting players to meet up at Woodhouse Moor a few days a week from 7 a.m. to 8 a.m. That advert attracted more than 500 members. From this interest several clubs were formed, including Leeds St John's.

Leeds St John's was formed in 1870 and was originally known as the "Old Blue and Ambers". The club played at the Militia Barracks from 1870 to 1888 before moving to Cardigan Fields, near Headingley, Leeds. Membership was originally confined to the church classes but was soon expanded. By 1887 St John's had reached its first cup final, the Yorkshire Cup losing to Wakefield Trinity.

The city of Leeds had an abundance of rugby football clubs and although members of the Yorkshire RFU (which was in turn a constituent body of the RFU), it was decided to form a 'more local' association. It was for this reason that the Leeds & District organisation was formalised when a meeting took place at the Green Dragon Hotel, Leeds on 27 September 1888. The foundation clubs were Bramley, Holbeck, Hunslet, Kirkstall, Leeds Parish Church, Leeds St John's and Wortley.

In 1888 the Cardigan Estate was sold at auction and Lot 17a was purchased by a group of Leeds citizens, who intended to form the city's leading sports club. Lot 17a became what is now Headingley Stadium.

Leeds St John's played its final season under that name in 1889–90, before becoming the football section of Leeds Cricket, Football and Athletic Co Ltd the following season. With Headingley still being completed, Leeds' first game was staged at Cardigan Fields, the home side defeating Otley. The first game at Headingley was played on 20 September 1890, when Manningham were beaten by one try and one dropped goal to nil.

After the 1890–91 season, Leeds along with other Yorkshire Senior clubs Batley, Bradford, Brighouse, Dewsbury, Halifax, Huddersfield, Hull, Hunslet, Leeds, Liversedge, Manningham and Wakefield decided that they wanted their own county league starting in 1891 along the lines of a similar competition that had been played in Lancashire. The clubs wanted full control of the league but the Yorkshire Rugby Football Union would not sanction the competition as it meant giving up control of rugby football to the senior clubs.

In 1892, 27,654 spectators, a then record in British rugby, attended the third round showdown between Leeds and Halifax at Headingley.

=== 1895–1920: Northern Union breakaway ===
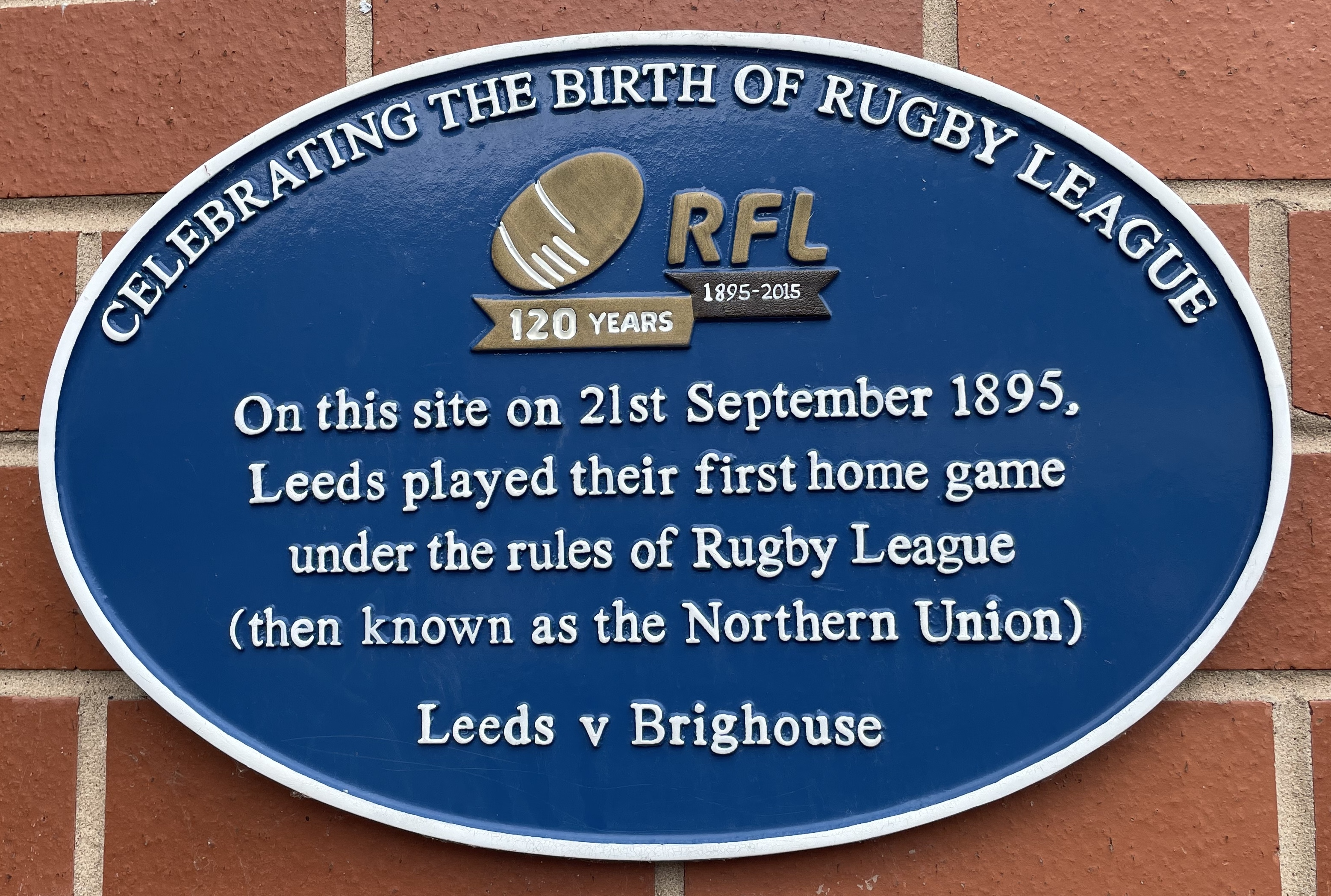
Plaque celebrating the birth of Rugby League in 1895

A special general meeting was held in 1895 that voted decisively to support the breakaway Northern Union as a founder member, resulting in two resignations from the club. Leeds' début in the Northern Union was a 6–3 success at Leigh on 7 September 1895, the inaugural day of the new competition.

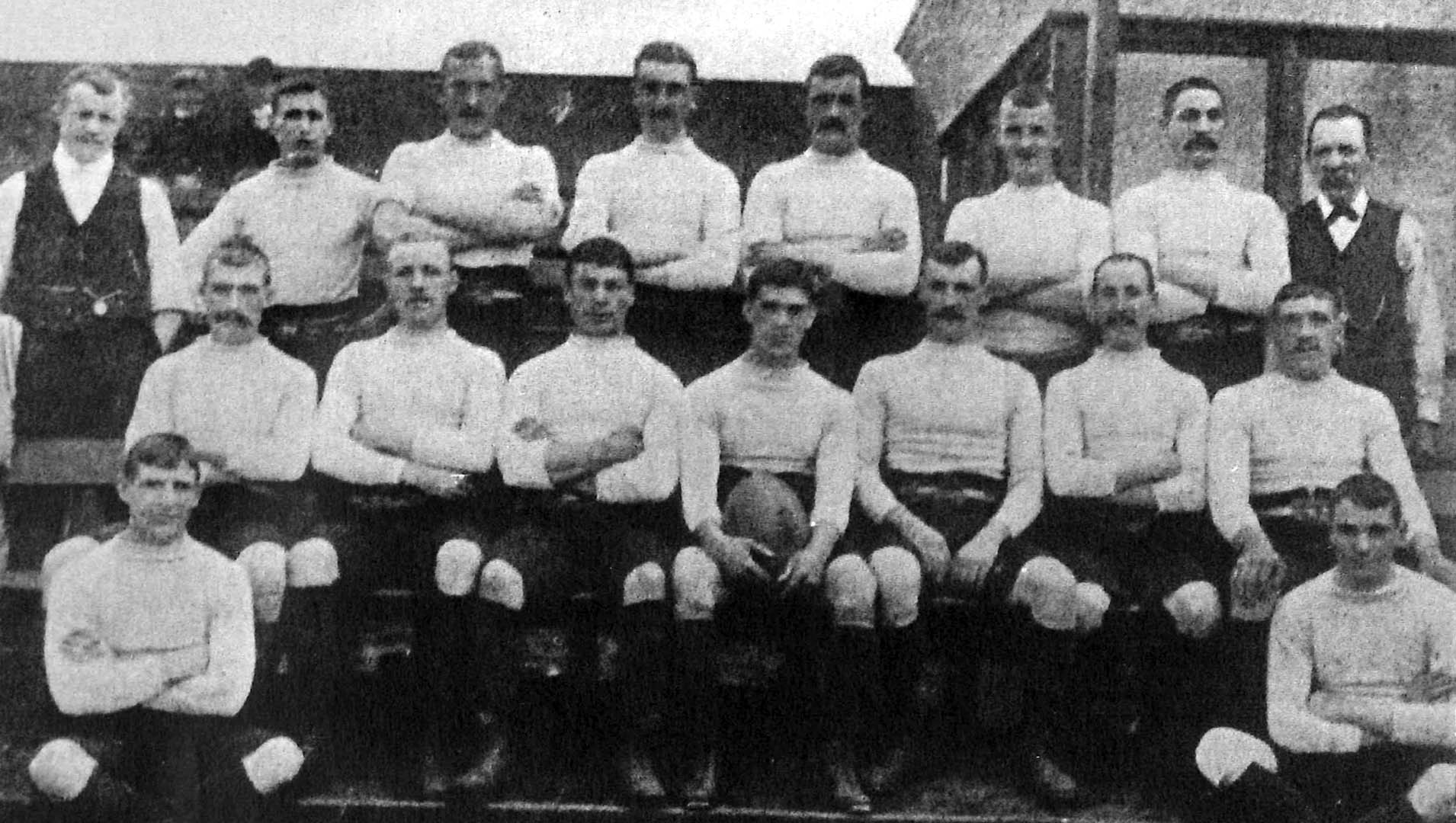
Leeds team of 1899–1900

In 1901, the Leeds Parish Church team disbanded and put all of its players at Leeds' disposal. That same year saw the formation of the Northern Rugby League, with a number of leading clubs leaving the Yorkshire League and the Lancashire League and joining the new competition. Leeds was not admitted until the following year when it was placed in the newly formed second division and quickly gained promotion as runners-up to Keighley.

Leeds City FC joined football's Second Division in 1905–06, and finished sixth out of 20 clubs in the club's first season. Rugby's monopoly with the locals seemed to have been broken, with Leeds Rugby League's average gate numbers falling by nearly 50% in that first league season.

In 1910, Leeds came of age with the team finishing in sixth place in the league, but that was just a warm-up for the Challenge Cup campaign. Leeds beat Hull Kingston Rovers, Rochdale Hornets, Keighley and then scraped through 11–10 against Warrington in the semifinal before meeting Hull F.C. in the final. Rain on the morning of the game meant conditions were against flowing rugby. The scores were level at 7–7 with fifteen minutes left. However, neither team could break the deadlock, and the final went to a replay two days later, again at Fartown, Huddersfield. Leeds made no mistake this time and ran out convincing 26–12 winners having led 16–0 at half-time.

The club lost many players to the First World War; of a total of fifty-one players who served in the military, fifteen were killed. The usual league programme was interrupted during 1914–18. During this period, Leeds played a number of "guest players" in the Emergency League competition. The Headingley club reached the Championship final for the first time in 1915, but lost 35–2 to Huddersfield, then a record score. The Emergency League was then suspended. Leeds reverted to rugby union during the First World War to play a one-off challenge game against the Royal Navy Depot from Plymouth in 1917. This was a precursor to the following Christmas when two Challenge games were organised between the two sides but this time with one of each code. The Navy won the union game 9–3 on Christmas Eve but proved equally adept at league recording a 24–3 win on 28 December.

=== 1921–1942: Inter-war period ===
In 1921, Harold Buck became the game's first £1,000 transfer when he moved from Hunslet to Leeds.

On Saturday 27 October 1934, Leeds and Wakefield Trinity met in the final of the Yorkshire Cup at Crown Flatt, Dewsbury. The match was played in front of a crowd of 22,598 and ended in a 5–5 draw. Four days later the two clubs drew again, with Leeds eventually lifting the trophy after a second replay, the only occasion it took three attempts to settle a Yorkshire Cup Final. A total of 52,402 spectators watched the three games.

Leeds forward Joe Thompson was the top point scorer for both the 1929–30 and 1927–28 seasons.

In 1937, Leeds paid the stand-off Vic Hey a then-record £1,400 signing-on fee to lure him from Australia. Vic was regarded as a major loss to the Australian game and this contributed to the RFL imposing a ban on international transfers, which lasted until 1940.

In 1938, Leeds played Swinton in the Rugby Football League Championship semi-final. Leeds won the match 5 points to 2 to set up a history-making all-Leeds clash with neighbours Hunslet in the final. The match was played at the Elland Road football ground, to accommodate a huge demand from the city's rugby league supporters. Over 54,000 people watched the game, a then record for a match in England. Hunslet triumphed 8–2 to take the title.

Leeds won the Challenge Cup in 1941 and 1942 beating Halifax both times at games held at Odsal.

=== 1950–1960: Post-war ===
Following the Second World War, Leeds club struggled to make a serious impact in rugby league despite having a financial advantage over the majority of other teams. Arthur Clues was the first Australian to come and play in Britain after the war and the great Australian second rower was signed by Leeds. His rivalry with the Great Britain and Wales prop Frank Whitcombe, who played for Bradford Northern was legendary. Their confrontations on the field during the Leeds v Bradford Northern local derby games are part of rugby league folklore.

It was not until the late 1950s, when in 1957 the club secured its first post-war Challenge Cup victory, that the young side being built began to show signs of what was to come. Joe Warham came to Leeds as coach in 1958 and a Yorkshire Cup triumph followed, but the side still lacked enough quality to compete at the top of the Lancashire section of the competition in which it was then playing.

However, "the Loiners" (their historical nickname) were to establish themselves as a dominant force by the end of the coming decade. In 1960 Dai Prosser was appointed to assist Joe Warham with the coaching duties and the club signed a new back three of Jack Fairbank, Brian Shaw and Dennis Goodwin to strengthen the forward pack. The recruitment paid off: the club was crowned Champions for the first time in 1961 with Lewis Jones leading them to a 25–10 victory over Warrington in the Championship Final at Odsal Stadium, Bradford.

=== 1960–1980: First Championship titles ===
In the late 1960s, under the guidance of Roy Francis, Leeds repeatedly finished top of the league. The club contested perhaps the most memorable of all Wembley occasions, the "watersplash final" of 1968, which was played despite a downpour that saturated the pitch. It produced the most dramatic of finishes, when Lance Todd trophy winner Don Fox had the easiest of conversions to win it for Wakefield Trinity, but missed it to leave Leeds 11–10 winners.

Francis then quit the club to take up a coaching position in Australia, and Joe Warham again took charge as coach, on an interim basis, midway through the 1969 campaign. The Championship trophy duly returned to Headingley for the second time after a tough final against Castleford at Odsal Stadium.

In 1970 Leeds returned to the Championship final, and Odsal, but lost to St. Helens despite having taken an early lead. Tables were turned in December when the same teams met in the final of the BBC2 Floodlit Trophy, Leeds emerging victorious this time.

Coached by Derek "Rocky" Turner, Leeds returned to Wembley in 1971 and 1972 but lost out both times – in 1971 losing 24–7 to rank outsiders Leigh and suffering the indignity of captain Syd Hynes being the first man to 'take an early bath' at Wembley. A third championship, in 1972, provided consolation.

Eric Ashton (former Wigan and Great Britain centre) coached Leeds for the 1973–74 season before leaving to coach St. Helens.

Leeds continued to collect silverware: the Regal Trophy in 1973 and the Premiership (the then-current form of the championship playoff) in 1975. The team held the Yorkshire Cup seven times between 1969 and 1980.

1976–77 was a season of mixed emotions. The Salford versus Leeds league match was abandoned after 38 minutes when Chris Sanderson of Leeds suffered a fatal injury. Leeds led 5–2, but the game was declared null and void and not replayed. The club recovered to win the Challenge Cup at the end of the season. This success was repeated in 1978, in a classic final against St Helens at Wembley Stadium with Leeds completing what was then a record comeback, from 10–0 down. Former captain Syd Hynes was coach on both occasions.

This was followed up with another Premiership win, in 1979. However, these victories were the 'last hurrah' of the great 1960s, and 1970s sides and a barren spell followed in the 1980s.

=== 1980–1996: Nearly Men ===
Leeds' only triumphs were the 1984 John Player Trophy (beating Widnes) under coach Maurice Bamford and the Yorkshire County Cup in 1980 (beating Hull Kingston Rovers) and 1988(beating Castleford). Leeds were beaten finalists in the John Player Trophy four times in the 1980s, and 1990s.

Between December 1986 and April 1988, Maurice Bamford was coach of Leeds.

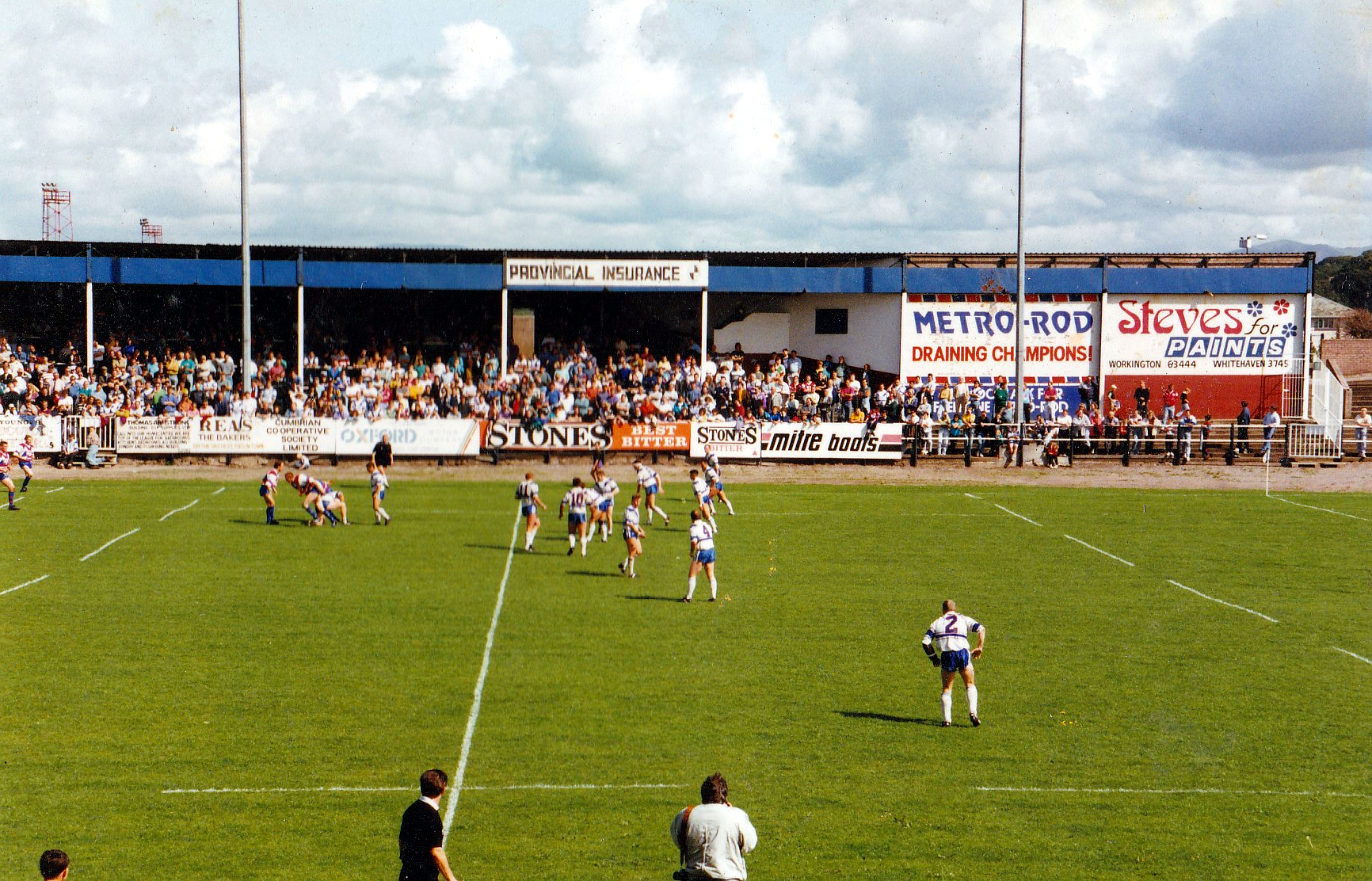
Leeds on the attack against Workington Town at Derwent Park in August 1994

Leeds eventually returned to Wembley for a Challenge Cup Final appearance in 1994 against Wigan. Leeds returned to Wembley a year later, again to face Wigan again, but were beaten more easily.

=== 1996–2003: Start of the Super League era ===
In 1996 Gary Hetherington sold his controlling interest in Sheffield Eagles and joined Paul Caddick to take over the ailing Leeds C F & A Co Ltd, owners and operators of Headingley Stadium and Leeds Rugby League Club. 1996 marked the beginning of summer rugby as the first tier of British rugby league clubs played the inaugural Super League season and changed from a winter to a summer season.

In 1997, the club renamed itself Leeds Rhinos. Dean Bell took over as head coach following his retirement as a player at Auckland Warriors. Iestyn Harris joined Leeds that year for a record-breaking £350,000 transfer and was appointed captain in his first full season at the age of only 21. Leeds experienced great financial difficulty and even flirted with relegation as they won only six matches all year and finished third from bottom in Super League, above only Oldham and Paris.

Bell became head of the academy team. In 1998 Graham Murray replaced Bell and joined the Leeds Rhinos as head coach and the team reached the inaugural Grand Final, at Old Trafford, being beaten by Wigan. In 1999 Leeds finally landed their first silverware in a decade, and their first Challenge Cup for more than 20 years, with a convincing 52–16 win over London at Wembley.

In 2000, Leeds reached the Challenge Cup Final but finished runners up to Yorkshire rivals Bradford at Murrayfield, Edinburgh. Daryl Powell became coach of Leeds after he retired from playing in 2001. In 2003, despite being top of the table at the time, Leeds announced Tony Smith would replace Darryl Powell as head coach for the 2004 season. Leeds returned to the Challenge Cup final in 2003, again to face Bradford, this time at the Millennium Stadium, Cardiff where they were beaten 22–20.

=== 2004–2017: Golden Era ===
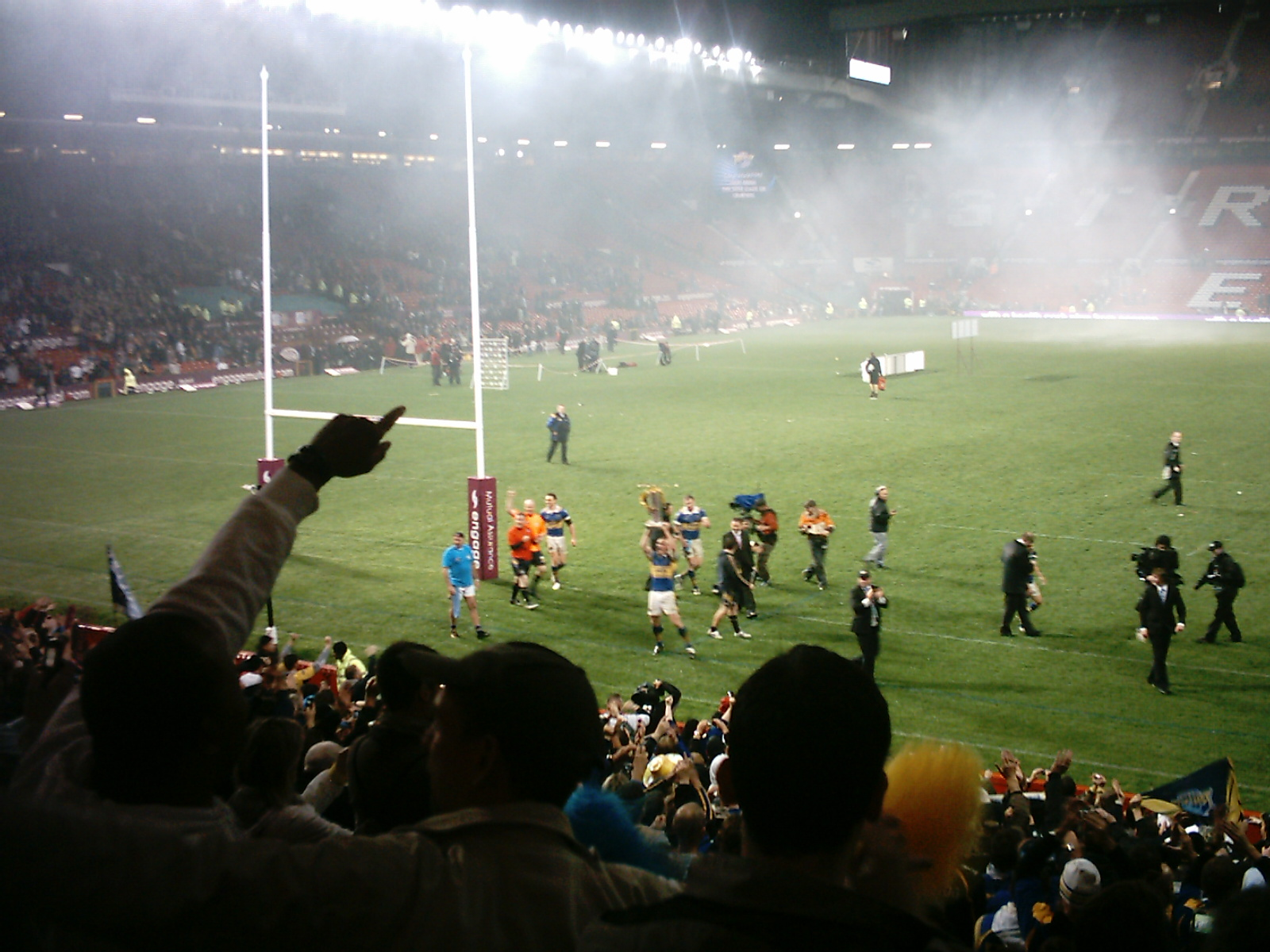
Leeds celebrating their 2008 Grand Final victory

The Rhinos ended their 32-year wait for a league championship by winning the 2004 Super League Grand Final This marked the start of more than a decade of on-field success. As champions of the previous year, Leeds played in the 2005 World Club Challenge beating the 2004 Australian premiers Canterbury Bulldogs. Leeds next trophy was the 2007 Grand Final, which marked the final game as coach of the club for Tony Smith. He was replaced by former New Zealand international team coach Brian McClennan. Further success followed in 2008 when Leeds again beat Australian opposition in the 2008 World Club Challenge, Melbourne Storm the defeated opponents on this occasion. Leeds then retained the Super League championship by winning the Grand final. This marked the first time the club had won consecutive titles. A third consecutive league title followed in 2009, when Leeds won the 2009 Super League Grand Final, and thus became the first club ever to win the trophy three times in a row.

After failing to win a trophy in 2010, Leeds started the 2011 season in mixed form, and by July appeared to be in danger of missing out on the play-offs completely. They ultimately did finish in a play-off spot and went on to win the 2011 Super League Grand Final. They reached the Challenge Cup Final in 2012, as they had the previous year, but again finished runners up. The Rhinos did however, successfully defend their Super League title by winning the 2012 Super League Grand Final. Success in the Grand Final earned them another World Club Challenge match against Melbourne Storm, in which they were defeated. Leeds would ultimately fail to win any silverware in 2013, however they did end their long run without a Challenge Cup final win by beating Castleford Tigers at Wembley in the 2014 final.

In March 2014, it was announced that Leeds would share a partnership with the Atlanta Rhinos, who play in the USA Rugby League. Leeds stated they would help bring a professional approach to the Atlanta club by sharing information and playing talent.

==== The Treble ====
Leeds had a highly successful season in 2015, winning the Challenge Cup, League Leaders Shield and the Grand Final, completing the modern day rugby league treble and becoming only the third team in the Super League era to achieve this after Bradford in 2003 and St. Helens in 2006.

Leeds' victory in the 2015 Grand Final was the final competitive game of Rugby League for three long serving players of the game, as Jamie Peacock & Kylie Leuluai retired at the end of the season and Kevin Sinfield joined Leeds' sister club in Rugby Union, Yorkshire Carnegie.

Leeds struggled in the season following their best ever season in 2015. they spent most of the regular season in the bottom two league positions before finding form and just missing out on 8th place to Widnes therefore being confined to fight to keep their Super League status in The Qualifiers for the first time. The club comfortably finished first in the Qualifiers only losing to Huddersfield.

The following season was a return to form, finishing second to Castleford and only a point off of their 2015 treble winning season tally. They went on to play Castleford in the Grand Final winning 24–6, the club's 11th title and 8th of the Super League era.

=== 2018–present: Struggles and rebuild ===
After the successful 2017 season, the 2016 season was written off as an anomaly, however 2018 was to be another bad year for the club. They finished 9th in the regular season and finished second in the Qualifiers narrowly avoiding the Million Pound Game on points difference.

For the 2019 season the club appointed former player David Furner as head coach to rebuild the team. After an unsuccessful start to the season Furner was sacked and replaced with Richard Agar as caretaker coach. Agars first game in charge was a loss in the Challenge Cup to second division Bradford Bulls. Agar was given the job permanently at the end of the season after keeping the club in Super League.

Leeds made a bright start to the 2020 Super League season although their season was disrupted due to the COVID-19 pandemic. Despite the postponed season the club made it to their first Challenge Cup final in five years where they beat Salford 17–16. It was their first major trophy after the 'Golden Era'. Leeds reached the first week of the playoffs but were eliminated after losing to Catalans Dragons 26–14.

In the 2021 Super League season, Leeds finished in 5th place on the table and qualified for the playoffs. In the elimination playoff, they defeated Wigan 8–0 at the DW Stadium to book a semi-final match against St Helens. Leeds started the 2022 Super League season poorly winning only one match in their opening 10 games. Before Leeds round 10 match against Toulouse Olympique, Leeds were sat 11th on the table. Following the clubs round 11 victory over Hull Kingston Rovers, Agar resigned as head coach of the club. He was later replaced by Rohan Smith. Under Smith, Leeds won 13 of their next 18 games to reach the 2022 Super League Grand Final. Along the way, the club upset both Catalans Dragons and Wigan in the playoffs to reach the decider. In the grand final, Leeds were defeated 24–12 against St Helens RFC. Leeds finished the 2023 Super League season in 8th place and could not replicate what happened in 2022. The club also suffered heavy losses throughout the year including a 61–0 loss against the Catalans Dragons and a 50–0 defeat by Wigan. Leeds finished the 2024 Super League season in the same position they finished a year earlier. Midway through the season, head coach Rohan Smith stepped down from his role and was replaced by former Parramatta head coach Brad Arthur.

In the 2025 Super League season, Leeds finished fourth on the table and qualified for the playoffs. In the elimination playoff game against St Helens, Leeds lead late in the second half but conceded two tries in the last five minutes, one of which came after the full-time siren as they lost the match 16-14 in the most heart breaking of circumstances.

== Stadium ==
Leeds have played at Headingley since 1890 and the ground is owned by Leeds. The rugby ground is also on the same site as the cricket ground operated by Yorkshire County Cricket Club. The North Stand of the rugby ground backs onto the cricket ground. The Carnegie Stand was built in 2006 to replace the old, uncovered, Eastern Terrace and also expanded the capacity to 21,000, adding extra seating on the top tier and terracing on the bottom.

Between 2017 and 2019 the stadium was extensively redeveloped with both the South and North Stands being demolished and replaced by modern constructions, the latter in co-operation with Yorkshire CCC. Seating was added in the upper level of the new South Stand and a large corporate suite, originally called the Emerald Suite, is located within the North Stand overlooking both cricket and rugby pitches. Any significant redevelopment or expansion of the Western Terrace would require the demolition of housing and rerouting of a public right of way.

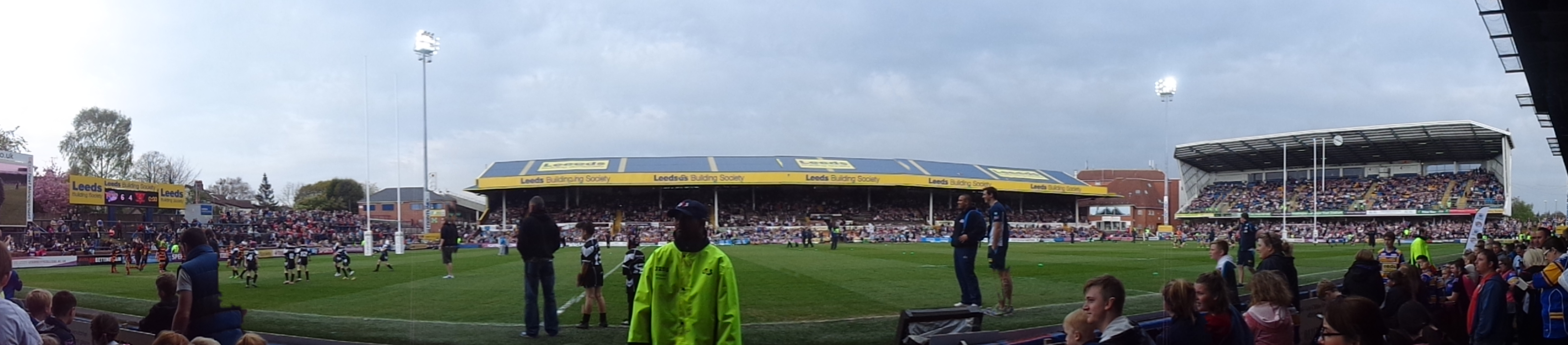
Headingley panorama

== Club identity ==
=== Colours ===
Leeds play in traditional Leeds colours blue and amber (home). Their home kits are famously blue with an amber band around the chest and on the arms. Between 2011 and 2013 Leeds wore pink away kits with proceeds of shirt sales going to breast cancer charities.

=== Badge ===
Between the club's foundation in 1865 and the formation of Super League in 1996 Leeds used the city's crest on their kits as they were just known as Leeds RLFC or Leeds Loiners. In 1996, the formation of Super League saw Leeds change their name to Leeds Rhinos. The new badge is mainly blue and has a rhino with the word rhino above it in a semi circle and Leeds at the top of the badge.

=== Kit sponsors and manufacturers ===
Leeds have had four shirt sponsors since 1981. In April 1994, they signed a 10-year sponsorship deal with Tetley's Brewery worth a record £2.3 million. The Rhinos' current main shirt sponsors, Leeds Building Society, are currently the longest sponsorship deal the club have had. In 2023 the club signed a three-year extension with Leeds Building Society, making it the longest shirt sponsorship deal of any English rugby team in both codes. Since 2020 the club's kits have been made by UK-based company Oxen.

Years	Kit Manufacturer	Main Shirt Sponsor
1968–1981	Umbro	none
1981–1990	Umbro	Younger's
1990–1994	Umbro	Carling
1994–1995	Ellgren	Tetley's
1995–2003	Asics	Tetley's
2004–2006	Patrick	Tetley's
2007	Patrick	Leeds Building Society
2008–2020	ISC	Leeds Building Society
2021–2026	Oxen	Leeds Building Society

=== Mascot ===
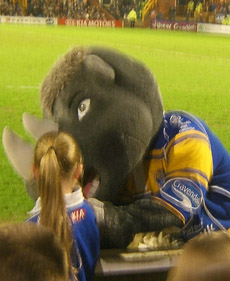
Ronnie the Rhino, the mascot of Leeds

Ronnie the Rhino is the mascot of Leeds Rhinos. He gets the crowd going before the match and at half time he normally gets children involved by playing some sort of game. Ronnie the Rhino visits schools as part of the Leeds Rhinos Community project, with the intention of promoting sports and healthy living. Former "Ronnie" Daniel Duffy stood for Leeds North West in the 1997 general election, obtaining 232 votes.

== Rivalries ==
During the early part of the Super League era, Leeds' main local rivals were Bradford Bulls, who they played in two Grand Finals and beat in 2004 to win their first Super League title. However the Bulls have since slipped down to the lower leagues and competitive games are rare. Leeds also have a cross-city rivalry with Hunslet, who they play annually in the Harry Jepson OBE Memorial Cup. Leeds and Hunslet F.C. played against each other in the 'all Leeds' 1938 Championship Final at Elland Road, won by Hunslet, which attracted a still-record Rugby League attendance for the city of 54,112. Since the 1970s, however, Hunslet have largely played in lower leagues so competitive fixtures are rare.

Leeds also have West Yorkshire derbies with Castleford Tigers and with Wakefield Trinity, who they play every Boxing Day in the annual Festive Challenge.

Since the formation of Super League there has been a major rivalry with St. Helens, who lost five consecutive Grand Finals between 2007 and 2011, four of which were against Leeds. The two sides have been the most successful during the Super League era. There are also other cross-Pennine rivalries against Wigan Warriors, whom they have played in big games and beat in a final for the first time in 2015, and against Warrington Wolves, who they have played in Challenge Cup and Grand Finals.

== 2027 squad ==
Where a player has played internationally for more than one country, the nations are indicated with the most recently represented first. A slash (/) indicates an uncapped player of dual nationality.

2027 Leeds Rhinos squad
First team squad			Coaching staff
(Australia) Jack Bird – CE, SR; (England) George Brown – SO, SH; (England) Presley Cassell – LF, PR, SR; (England) Jake Connor (vc) – SH, CE, FB, SO; (Serbia) Nick Čotrić – WG, CE; (England) Alfie Edgell – WG; (England) Morgan Gannon – SR; (Jamaica) Delaine Gittens-Bedward – PR; (New Zealand) Wiremu Greig – PR; (England) Ash Handley (c) – CE, WG	(England) Chris Hankinson – CE, SR; (England) Tom Holroyd – PR; (Australia) Cooper Jenkins – PR, SR; (Samoa) Danny Levi – HK; (England) Ben Littlewood – SR; (England) Zak Lloyd – SR; (England) Riley Lumb – WG; (Australia) Lachie Miller – FB; (England) Fergie McCormack – FB; (England) Tom Nicholson-Watton – PR	(England) Jarrod O'Connor – HK, LF; (Samoa) Keenan Palasia – PR, LF; (Australia) Edenn Rogers-Smith – SR, PR; (France) Hugo Salabio – PR; (England) Max Simpson – CE; (Fiji) Maika Sivo – WG; (England) Harley Thomas – FB; (Australia) Dylan Walker – CE, SO; (England) Kallum Watkins (vc) – SR, LF	Head coach: (Australia) Brad Arthur; Assistant coaches: (England) Jamie Langley; (Ireland) Scott Grix; (England) Chev Walker; Legend: (c) Captain(s); (vc) Vice-captain(s); (red card) = suspended; = injured; (gk) = Goal kicker; Updated: Source(s): https://www.therhinos.co.uk/teams/men

== 2027 transfers ==
=== Players In ===
Player	From	Contract	Date
(England) Morgan Gannon	New Zealand Warriors	3 years	19 June 2026
(Australia) Dylan Walker	Parramatta Eels	3 years	6 July 2026
(Serbia) Nick Čotrić	Catalan Dragons	4 years	3 September 2026
(Australia) Edenn Rogers-Smith	Catalan Dragons	2 years	3 September 2026
(New Zealand) Wiremu Greig	North Queensland Cowboys	1 year	15 October 2026
(France) Hugo Salabio	Hull FC	1 year	20 October 2026
(Jamaica) Delaine Gittens-Bedward	Halifax Panthers	1 year	20 October 2026

=== Players Out ===
Player	To	Contract	Date
(England) Harry Newman	Perth Bears	2 years	2 December 2025
(Ireland) James McDonnell	Perth Bears	2 years	12 January 2026
(England) Mikołaj Olędzki	Perth Bears	3 years	17 March 2026
(England) Cameron Smith	Wakefield Trinity	4 years	28 January 2026
(England) Ned McCormack	Wakefield Trinity	3 years	8 September 2026
(Australia) Brodie Croft	Warrington Wolves	3 years	21 May 2026
(Australia) Jeremiah Mata'utia			8 July 2026
(Australia) Matt Lodge			8 October 2026

=== Retired ===
Player	Date
(England) Ryan Hall	9 October 2026

== Players ==
=== Harry Sunderland Trophy winners ===
The Harry Sunderland Trophy is awarded to the Man-of-the-Match in the Super League Grand Final by the Rugby League Writers' Association.

Season	Recipient
1968–69	(England) Bev Risman
1971–72	(England) Terry Clawson
1974–75	(England) Mel Mason
1978–79	(England) Kevin Dick
2004	(England) Matt Diskin
2007	(England) Rob Burrow
2008	(England) Lee Smith
2009	(England) Kevin Sinfield
2011	(England) Rob Burrow
2012	(England) Kevin Sinfield
2015	(England) Danny McGuire
2017	(England) Danny McGuire

=== Lance Todd Trophy winners ===
The Lance Todd Trophy is awarded to the Man-of-the-Match in the Challenge Cup Final. Introduced in 1946, the trophy was named in memory of Lance Todd, the New Zealand-born player and administrator, who was killed in a road accident during the Second World War.

Season	Recipient	Position
1957	(England) Jeff Stevenson	Scrum-half
1977	(England) Steve Pitchford	Prop
1999	(England) Leroy Rivett	Wing
2003	(England) Gary Connolly †	Fullback
2005	(England) Kevin Sinfield †	Loose forward
2014	(England) Ryan Hall	Wing
2015	(England) Tom Briscoe	Wing
2020	(England) Richie Myler	Fullback

† = Won Lance Todd Trophy whilst on losing side

=== Man of Steel winners ===
The Man of Steel Award (latterly the Steve Prescott Man of Steel Award) is an annual honour, awarded by the Super League to the most outstanding player in the British game for that year.

Year	Winner	Position
1977	(England) David Ward	Hooker
1991	(England) Garry Schofield	Stand-off
1998	(Wales) Iestyn Harris	Stand-off
2015	(England) Zak Hardaker	Full-Back
2025	(England) Jake Connor	Scrum-half

=== Golden Boot winners ===
The Golden Boot Award is a rugby league award handed out annually for achievements in rugby league by Rugby League World magazine. The Golden Boot is given, usually in December after the conclusion of all the year's matches, to the player adjudged to be the best in the world, as determined by a ballot of international media representatives.

It was decided by the judges that Garry Schofield should be the winner in 1990, but the sponsors of the Golden Boot backed out and the award was shelved. After a nine-year hiatus, League Publications Ltd, having bought Rugby League World, brought back the award in 1999. In 2011 they decided to give Schofield his Golden Boot and he is now included in the roll call of winners of the prestigious award.

The oldest winner of the award is Kevin Sinfield, who won in 2012 at the age of 32.

Year	Winner
1990	(England) Garry Schofield
2012	(England) Kevin Sinfield

=== Hall of Fame ===
The Rhinos instigated a hall of fame in 2017. Up to four players will be inducted each year. The qualifications for inductees are that they have:

- made at least 150 appearances for the club,
- made an exceptional contribution to rugby in Leeds,
- achieved representative honours, and
- been retired for at least five years (apart from in exceptional circumstances, as was the case with Rob Burrow in 2020).

Year	Name	Years	Apps	Tries	Goals	Points
2017	(Australia) Keith McLellan	1951–1958	215	69	5	217
2017	(Wales) Lewis Jones	1952–1964	385	144	1244	2920
2017	(England) John Holmes	1968–1990	625	153	539	1554
2017	(England) David Ward	1971–1986	482	40	2	143
2018	(Wales) Joe Thompson	1923–1933	390	53	862	1883
2018	(England) Bev Risman	1966–1970	164		611	
2018	(England) Jeff Stevenson	1952–1959	228	67		
2018	(England) Garry Schofield	1987–1996	251	147	64	746
2019	(Republic of Ireland) Barrie McDermott	1996–2005	283	40	0	160
2019	(Australia) Eric Harris	1930–1939	383	391	16	1208
2019	(England) Syd Hynes	1965–1975	366	158	156	850
2019	(England) John Atkinson	1966–1982	518	340	0	1020
2020	(Australia) Arthur Clues	1947–1954	238	74	0	222
2020	(England) Fred Webster	1902–1920	543	76	4	236
2020	(England) Les Dyl	1970–1985	434	193	11	604
2020	(England) Rob Burrow	2004–2017	493	198	157	1111
2021	(England) Jim Brough	1925–1944	442	34	82	266
2021	(England) Don Robinson	1956–64	296	63		189
2021	(England) Alan Smith	1962–1983	469	283		849
2021	(England) Kevin Sinfield	1997–2015	521	86	1792 + 39 drop goals	3967

== Staff ==
=== First Team coaching staff ===
Position	Staff
First Team Coach	(Australia) Brad Arthur
Assistant Coach	(England) Jamie Langley
Assistant Coach	(Ireland) Scott Grix
Assistant Coach	(England) Chev Walker
Rugby General Manager	(England) Matt Cook
Performance Director	(England) Ian Blease
Head of Analysis	(England) James Bletsoe
Kit Manager	(England) Glynn Bell

=== Club officials ===
Leeds CF&A Co Ltd Owner and Chairman	(England) Paul Caddick
Chief Executive	(England) Jamie Jones-Buchanan
Commercial Director	(England) Rob Oates
Finance Director	(England) Peter Hirst
Legal Director	(England) Chris Ross
Non-Executive Director	(England) Jeffery Walton
Rugby League Impact and Growth Manager	(England) Danny McGuire

== Honours ==
=== League ===
First Division / Super League:

- Winners (11): 1960–61, 1968–69, 1971–72, 2004, 2007, 2008, 2009, 2011, 2012, 2015, 2017
- Runners up (12): 1914–15, 1928–29, 1929–30, 1930–31, 1937–38, 1969–70, 1972–73, 1994–95, 1995–96, 1998, 2005, 2022

Second Division / Championship:

- Runners up (1): 1902–03

Premiership:

- Winners (2): 1974–75, 1978–79
- Runners up (1): 1994–95

RFL Yorkshire League:

- Winners (15): 1901–02, 1927–28, 1930–31, 1933–34, 1934–35, 1936–37, 1937–38, 1950–51, 1954–55, 1956–57, 1960–61, 1966–67, 1967–68, 1968–69, 1969–70

=== Cups ===
Challenge Cup:

- Winners (14): 1909–10, 1922–23, 1931–32, 1935–36, 1940–41, 1941–42, 1956–57, 1967–68, 1976–77, 1977–78, 1999, 2014, 2015, 2020
- Runners up (12): 1942–43, 1946–47, 1970–71, 1971–72, 1993–94, 1994–95, 2000, 2003, 2005, 2010, 2011, 2012

League Cup:

- Winners (2): 1972–73, 1983–84
- Runners up (3): 1982–83, 1987–88, 1991–92

BBC2 Floodlit Trophy:

- Winners (1): 1970–71

Yorkshire Cup:

- Winners (17): 1921–22, 1928–29, 1930–31, 1932–33, 1934–35, 1935–36, 1937–38, 1958–59, 1968–69, 1970–71, 1972–73, 1973–74, 1975–76, 1976–77, 1979–80, 1980–81, 1988–89
- Runners up (4): 1919–20, 1947–48, 1961–62, 1964–65,

=== International ===
World Club Challenge:

- Winners (3): 2005, 2008, 2012
- Runners up (5): 2009, 2010, 2013, 2016, 2018

== Records ==
=== Club Records ===
- Biggest win:

102-0 v. Coventry (at Headingley, 1913)

- Biggest loss:

74-0 v. New Zealand (at Headingley, 8 October 2022)

- Highest all-time attendance:

40,175 v. Bradford (at Headingley, 21 May 1947)

- Highest Super League attendance:

23,246 v. Castleford (at Elland Road, 23 March 2018)

=== Player Records ===
Most appearances

#	Name	Career	Caps
1	John Holmes	1968–1989	625
2	Fred Webster	1902–1920	543
3	Kevin Sinfield	1997–2015	521
4	John Atkinson	1965–1982	518
5	Rob Burrow	2001–2017	492
6	David Ward	1971–1987	482
7	Alan Smith	1962–1983	479
8	Danny McGuire	2001–2017	468
9	Jim Brough	1925–1944	442
10	Ray Batten	1963–1976	434

== Notable supporters ==
=== Actors ===
- Matthew Lewis
- Sean Bean

=== Presenters ===
- Gabby Logan
- Chris Hollins
- Sue Barker
- Clare Balding (TV)

=== Athletes ===
- Wayne Rooney
- Tim Henman
- Boris Becker
- Danyl Johnson
- Nicky Campbell
- Sean Morley (better known as Val Venis, Canadian Wrestler on WWE)
- Martin O'Neill
- Steve Walford
- Alistair Brownlee
- Jonathan Brownlee
- Alex Brooker
- Jonny Bairstow
- Ben Darwin
- Peter Wright

== Other teams ==
Since 2017, Leeds Rhinos have operated a women's rugby league team and a netball team. Both teams compete in the top tier of their respective competitions, the RFL Women's Super League and the Netball Superleague. Since 2018, they have also operated a Physical Disability Team as well as a Learning Disability Team from 2019. They also have a wheelchair team that competes in the RFL Wheelchair Super League.
