= 2022 Bradford Bulls season =

- Championship Rank: 9th
- Challenge Cup: 5th Round
- 2022 record: Wins: 12; draws: 0; losses: 17
- Points scored: For: 573; against: 705

Team information
- Chairman: Nigel Wood
- Head Coach: Mark Dunning (was John Kear)
- Captain: Steve Crossley
- Stadium: Odsal Stadium

Top scorers
- Tries: Kieran Gill (18)
- Goals: Dec Patton (85)
- Points: Dec Patton (178)
← 2021	List of seasons	2023 →

This article details the Bradford Bulls rugby league football club's 2022 season. This is the Bulls' fourth consecutive season in the Championship.

== Season review ==
=== August 2021 ===
Academy graduate and hooker Thomas Doyle penned a one-year extension to stay with the Bulls.

=== September 2021 ===
Halfback Jordan Lilley signed a two-year extension to his contract. Widnes Vikings announced the signing of Bulls prop Levy Nzoungou for the 2022 season. Second-rower Brad England signed a one-year extension with the club after impressing John Kear last season. Prop forward Anthony Walker signed a one-year deal to stay at the Bulls. Bradford's first new signing came in the form of prolific try-scoring centre Kieran Gill who signed a two-year deal from fellow Championship side Newcastle Thunder. Captain and prop forward Steve Crossley signed a one-year extension to stay at the club. Young winger Joe Brown signed for Championship rivals York City Knights on a one-year deal. Former two time loan prop Jordan Baldwinson returned to the club on a two year permanent deal from York. Winger Jack Sanderson left the club after one season. Centre Reece Hamlett joined the Swinton Lions for the 2022 season following numerous loan spells there the previous year. In what was seen as a major coup for the club, the Bulls announced the signing of Super League halfback Declan Patton on a one-year deal from Salford Red Devils.

=== October 2021 ===
The Bulls announced the signing of powerhouse prop Samy Kibula on a one-year deal from Super League side Warrington Wolves. Bradford also signed fullback Elliot Hall on a two-year deal from Batley Bulldogs. Young second row academy product Brad Gallagher was released from his contract in order to pursue other playing opportunities, it was later announced that he had signed with Newcastle Thunder. Winger David Foggin-Johnston signed a one-year extension to his contract. Veteran hooker George Flanagan signed a one-year extension to stay with the Bulls for the 2022 season. Rivals Featherstone Rovers announced the signing of Bradford fullback Brandon Pickersgill. Winger Matty Dawson-Jones announced that he was staying at the club for another year after initially considering retirement due to injuries he sustained last season. The Bulls revealed that they had signed fast-paced winger Ryan Millar from Sheffield Eagles on a two-year deal. Young prop Ethan O'Hanlon and academy hooker Cameron Berry joined RFL League 1 side Hunslet R.L.F.C. for the 2022 season. Versatile youngster Billy Jowitt signed a two-year extension to stay at the club. The Bulls continued to strengthen their pack for 2022 as they announced the signing of York City Knights second row forward Sam Scott on a one-year deal.

=== November 2021 ===
Veteran halfback Danny Brough announced his retirement on medical advice due to injuries sustained throughout his career. Prop forward Daniel Fleming signed a two-year extension to stay at the club. Academy grown centre Ross Oakes signed a two-year deal with rival RFL Championship side Sheffield Eagles. Highly rated youngster Ebon Scurr re-signed with the Bulls for two more years following Super League interest from Hull F.C. and reigning champions St Helens R.F.C. Vice captain Sam Hallas joined Championship rivals Newcastle Thunder on a two-year deal. The Bulls signed young Leeds Rhinos academy players Coby Nichol and A.J. Wallace on one year deals. Young forward Bradley Ho signed a new two-year extension to his contract. The 2022 fixtures were released and it was revealed that the Bulls would kick off the season away at Dewsbury Rams on 30 January, before facing Sheffield Eagles at home the following week. The Bulls signed young forward Jamie Pye from St Helens R.F.C. on a three month trial basis. Bradford announced that their first pre-season friendly would take place on Boxing Day at Odsal Stadium against Halifax Panthers. Bradford also signed young halfback Charlie Harris from Castleford Tigers academy. The club released their home shirt for the upcoming season and in honor of the Super League win 25 years ago, the new shirt is modelled from the 1997 shirt. Another pre-season friendly was announced with the Bulls set to take on Batley Bulldogs in January at Odsal Stadium.

=== December 2021 ===
The Bulls announced three season long loans in the form of prop Muizz Mustapha, hooker Corey Johnson and loose forward Jarrod O'Connor all from local rivals Leeds Rhinos, it was also revealed that the Bulls will play the Rhinos in a pre-season friendly on 23 January. Trialist Jamie Pye left the club and signed a permanent deal with Oldham R.L.F.C. Super League side Hull F.C. revealed that they would once again partner the Bulls in a dual registration for the upcoming season, whilst also announcing they would face the Bulls in a friendly for Danny Brough's testimonial. The 2022 away kit and the squad numbers were released mid-month, with Elliot Kear taking the number 1 shirt. Other notable squad numbers were new signings Kieran Gill, Ryan Miller and Declan Patton took the 4,5 and 6 shirts, whilst Anthony Walker was promoted to number 8. The Boxing Day clash against Halifax was postponed due to adverse weather conditions.

=== January 2022 ===
Bradford announced another friendly, this time against RFL League 1 side Midlands Hurricanes at Odsal on 12 February. As this is during the RFL Championship season, the Bulls will have a mixture of players not selected for the league game and academy/reserve players. The Bulls fell short in their first pre-season friendly losing 28-22 to Batley Bulldogs. Bradford put on a strong showing against a youthful Hull F.C. side as the Bulls ran out 42-12 winners in the second pre-season friendly with the highlights coming from David Foggin-Johnston's two tries and Dec Patton kicking six goals for a 100% conversion rate. The fixtures for the 2022 Summer Bash were released and it was revealed that the Bulls would face local rivals Halifax Panthers on 30 July at Headingley Stadium. Bradford lost their last pre-season friendly 12-30 against historic rivals Leeds Rhinos in front of a huge 7,237 crowd. The Bulls got their 2022 RFL Championship season off to a great start with a comprehensive 46-16 win against Dewsbury Rams with Matty Dawson-Jones and new signing Keiran Gill both scoring two tries each.

=== February 2022 ===
Young prop forward Bradley Ho joined RFL League 1 side Keighley Cougars on a season long loan. The draw for the 3rd and 4th Rounds of the 2022 Challenge Cup were made with the Bulls being drawn away to RFL Championship side London Broncos. New halfback Dec Patton signed a one-year extension to his contract to keep him at the Bulls until the end of 2023. The Bulls came crashing back down to earth as they suffered a shock 28-14 loss to Sheffield Eagles in wet conditions, new centre Kieran Gill scored for the second consecutive game whilst centre Rhys Evans scored Bradford's other try. Forward Chester Butler joined the Bulls on loan from Super League side Huddersfield Giants on a season long loan. Bradford suffered a heavy 38-4 defeat at the hands of high flying Leigh Centurions with Gill scoring the only try for the Bulls. The game against Barrow Raiders was postponed due to a water logged pitch caused by Storm Eunice.

== Milestones ==
- Round 1: Kieran Gill, Dec Patton, A.J. Wallace, Corey Johnson and Muizz Mustapha made their debuts for the Bulls.
- Round 1: Kieran Gill, Dec Patton and A.J. Wallace all scored their 1st tries for the Bulls.
- Round 1: Dec Patton kicked his 1st goal for the Bulls.
- Round 2: Ryan Millar made his debut for the Bulls.
- Round 3: Sam Scott and Chester Butler made their debuts for the Bulls.
- CCR4: Elliot Hall and Samy Kibula made their debuts for the Bulls.
- CCR4: Ryan Millar scored his 1st try for the Bulls.
- CCR4: Sam Scott scored his 1st try for the Bulls.
- CCR4: Kieran Gill scored his 1st hat-trick for the Bulls.
- Round 5: Jarrod O'Connor and Liam Tindall made their debuts for the Bulls.
- Round 5: Liam Tindall scored his 1st try for the Bulls.
- Round 4: Chester Butler and Elliot Hall scored their 1st try for the Bulls.
- Round 9: Sam Walters made his debut for the Bulls.
- Round 12: Tom Holroyd made his debut for the Bulls.
- Round 12: Dec Patton reached 100 points for the Bulls.
- Round 13: Jordan Baldwinson scored his 1st try for the Bulls.
- Round 14: Michael Hoyle made his debut for the Bulls.
- Round 15: Ben Evans made his 50th appearance for the Bulls.
- Round 15: Corey Johnson scored his 1st try for the Bulls.
- Round 16: Samy Kibula scored his 1st try for the Bulls.
- Round 18: Thomas Doyle made his 50th appearance for the Bulls.
- Round 19: George Flanagan Jr made his debut for the Bulls.
- Round 19: George Flanagan Jr scored his 1st try for the Bulls.
- Round 19: Elliot Kear scored his 25th try and reached 100 points for the Bulls.
- Round 20: Jacob Gannon made his debut for the Bulls.
- Round 21: Steve Crossley made his 150th appearance for the Bulls.
- Round 22: Myles Lawford made his debut for the Bulls.
- Round 23: Myles Lawford scored his 1st try for the Bulls.
- Round 23: Elliot Kear kicked his 1st goal for the Bulls.
- Round 24: Jacob Hookem made his debut for the Bulls.
- Round 24: Rhys Evans made his 50th appearance for the Bulls.
- Round 25: David Gibbons and Marcus Green made their debuts for the Bulls.

== Pre-season friendlies ==
LEGEND
Win
Draw
Loss

Date	Competition	Vrs	H/A	Venue	Result	Score	Tries	Goals	Att	Report
26 December 2021	Pre Season	Halifax Panthers	H	Odsal Stadium	N/A	P-P				Report
9 January 2022	Pre Season	Batley Bulldogs	H	Odsal Stadium	L	22-28	Crossley, Fleming, Kear, Scott	Patton 3/4		Report
16 January 2022	Pre Season	Hull F.C.	H	Odsal Stadium	W	42-18	Foggin-Johnston (2), Doyle, B. Evans, Gill, Kear, Nichol	Patton 6/6, Jowitt 1/1		Report
23 January 2022	Pre Season	Leeds Rhinos	H	Odsal Stadium	L	12-30	R. Evans, Gill	Patton 2/2	7,237	Report
12 February 2022	Pre Season	Midlands Hurricanes	H	Odsal Stadium	L	14-16	Briggs, Burton, Harris	Camden 1/2, Lawford 0/1	876	Report

=== Player appearances ===
- Friendly games only

FB=Fullback	C=Centre	W=Winger	SO=Stand Off	SH=Scrum half	P=Prop	H=Hooker	SR=Second Row	LF=Loose forward	B=Bench

No	Player	1	2	3
1	Elliot Kear	W	FB	FB
2	Matty Dawson-Jones	W	W	W
3	Rhys Evans	C	C	C
4	Kieran Gill	C	C	C
5	Ryan Millar			
6	Declan Patton	SO	SO	SH
7	Jordan Lilley			
8	Anthony Walker	P	B	P
9	Thomas Doyle	B	H	
10	Steve Crossley	P	B	P
11	Aaron Murphy		SR	SR
12	Sam Scott	SR	B	SR
13	Ben Evans	L	B	
14	George Flanagan	H	x	H
15	Jordan Baldwinson	B	L	L
16	Ebon Scurr	B	P	B
17	Brad England			
18	Samy Kibula			
19	David Foggin-Johnston	B	W	W
20	Billy Jowitt	SH	SH	SO
21	Elliot Hall	x		
22	Joe Burton	FB	B	B
23	Bradley Ho	x	B	B
24	A.J. Wallace	SR	SR	B
27	Eldon Myers	x	x	B
29	Dan Fleming	B	P	
n/a	Coby Nichol	x	B	B
n/a	Sam Arundel	B	B	B
n/a	Lewis Camden	B	B	B
n/a	Ryan Forshaw	B	B	B
n/a	Adam Horner	B	B	x
n/a	Taylor Mail	x	x	B

= Injured

= Suspended

== RFL Championship ==
=== Matches ===
LEGEND
Win
Draw
Loss
Postponed

Date	Competition	Rnd	Vrs	H/A	Venue	Result	Score	Tries	Goals	Att	Live on TV	Report
30 January 2022	Championship	1	Dewsbury Rams	A	Crown Flatt	W	46-16	Dawson-Jones (2), Gill (2), Foggin-Johnston, Kear, Patton, Wallace	Patton 7/8	Attendance	-	Report
6 February 2022	Championship	2	Sheffield Eagles	H	Odsal Stadium	L	14-28	R. Evans, Gill	Patton 3/3	Attendance	-	Report
14 February 2022	Championship	3	Leigh Centurions	A	Leigh Sports Village	L	4-38	Gill	Patton 0/1	Attendance	Premier Sports	Report
20 February 2022	Championship	4	Barrow Raiders	H	Odsal Stadium	N/A	P-P	Postponed due to Storm Eunice	-	-	-	Report
6 March 2022	Championship	5	Batley Bulldogs	H	Odsal Stadium	W	21-20	Doyle, Murphy, Tindall	Patton 4/4, Lilley 1 DG	Attendance	-	Report
20 March 2022	Championship	6	Workington Town	A	Derwent Park	W	26-12	Doyle, Gill, Murphy, Tindall	Patton 5/5	Attendance	-	Report
3 April 2022	Championship	7	London Broncos	A	Plough Lane	W	8-6	Dawson-Jones	Patton 2/3	Not Announced		Report
10 April 2022	Championship	4	Barrow Raiders	H	Odsal Stadium	L	22-23	Butler, Dawson-Jones, Doyle, Hall	Patton 3/4	Attendance	-	Report
15 April 2022	Championship	8	Halifax Panthers	H	Odsal Stadium	L	17-20	Crossley, Scott	Patton 4/4, Lilley 1 DG	Attendance	-	Report
25 April 2022	Championship	9	Featherstone Rovers	H	Odsal Stadium	L	18-32	Foggin-Johnston, Hall, Wallace	Patton 3/3	Attendance	Premier Sports	Report
1 May 2022	Championship	10	Whitehaven R.L.F.C.	A	Recreation Ground	W	34-22	Burton (2), Doyle, Kear, Lilley, Scurr	Patton 5/6	Attendance	-	Report
15 May 2022	Championship	11	York City Knights	H	Odsal Stadium	L	6-20	Hall	Patton 1/1	Attendance	-	Report
21 May 2022	Championship	12	Newcastle Thunder	H	Odsal Stadium	W	36-20	Doyle (2), Gill (2), Patton, Wallace	Patton 6/6	Attendance	-	Report
2 June 2022	Championship	13	Widnes Vikings	A	Halton Stadium	W	31-6	Millar (2), Baldwinson, Burton, Gill	Patton 5/6, Flanagan 1 DG	-	-	Report
6 June 2022	Championship	14	Featherstone Rovers	A	Post Office Road	L	12-58	Doyle, Flanagan	Patton 2/2	Attendance	Premier Sports	Report
12 June 2022	Championship	15	Sheffield Eagles	A	Olympic Legacy Park	W	30-10	Millar (2), Foggin-Johnston, Johnson, Pickersgill	Patton 5/6	Attendance	-	Report
26 June 2022	Championship	16	Dewsbury Rams	H	Odsal Stadium	W	48-6	Butler (2), Crossley, Gill, Kear, Kibula, Lilley, Millar	Patton 8/8	Attendance	-	Report
3 July 2022	Championship	17	Leigh Centurions	H	Odsal Stadium	L	6-56	Gill	Patton 1/1	Attendance	-	Report
8 July 2022	Championship	18	Newcastle Thunder	A	Kingston Park	L	10-53	Foggin-Johnston, Millar	Patton 1/2	Attendance	Premier Sports	Report
16 July 2022	Championship	19	London Broncos	H	Odsal Stadium	L	12-30	Flanagan Jr, Kear	Patton 2/2	2,762	-	Report
24 July 2022	Championship	20	Barrow Raiders	A	Craven Park	L	4-30	Gill	Patton 0/1	Attendance	-	Report
30 July 2022	Summer Bash	21	Halifax Panthers	N	Headingley Stadium	L	6-22	Gill	Patton 1/1	Attendance	Premier Sports	Report
7 August 2022	Championship	22	Workington Town	H	Odsal Stadium	W	48-18	Flanagan (2), Burton, Butler, Gill, Hallas, Millar, Wallace	Patton 8/8	2,691	-	Report
15 August 2022	Championship	23	York City Knights	A	LNER Community Stadium	W	20-16	Flanagan, Lawford, Wallace	Kear 4/4	Attendance	Premier Sports	Report
21 August 2022	Championship	24	Whitehaven R.L.F.C.	H	Odsal Stadium	L	4-12	Gill	Kear 0/1	2,670	-	Report
28 August 2022	Championship	25	Halifax Panthers	A	Shay Stadium	L	18-40	Butler, Flanagan, Kibula	Kear 3/3	Attendance	-	Report
4 September 2022	Championship	26	Batley Bulldogs	A	Mount Pleasant	L	12-40	Butler, Hallas	Kear 2/2	Attendance	-	Report
11 September 2022	Championship	27	Widnes Vikings	H	Odsal Stadium	L	10-23	Crossley, Dawson-Jones	Kear 1/2	Attendance	-	Report

=== Table ===
Pos	Team	Pld	W	D	L	PF	PA	PD	Pts	Qualification
1	Leigh Centurions	27	26	0	1	1306	208	+1098	52	Championship Leaders' Shield & advance to play-off semi-final
2	Featherstone Rovers	27	23	1	3	1060	468	+592	47	Advance to play-off semi-final
3	Halifax Panthers	27	20	0	7	837	442	+395	40	Advance to play-off eliminators
4	Barrow Raiders	27	18	1	8	757	587	+170	37	Advance to play-off eliminators
5	Batley Bulldogs	27	17	2	8	738	551	+187	36	Advance to play-off eliminators
6	York City Knights	27	18	0	9	677	596	+81	36	Advance to play-off eliminators
7	Sheffield Eagles	27	12	0	15	701	660	+41	24	
8	Widnes Vikings	27	12	0	15	567	679	−112	24	
9	Bradford Bulls	27	11	0	16	523	677	−154	22	
10	Whitehaven	27	9	1	17	488	854	−366	19	
11	London Broncos	27	8	1	18	548	740	−192	17	
12	Newcastle Thunder	27	7	1	19	559	877	−318	15	
13	Dewsbury Rams	27	3	1	23	385	964	−579	7	Relegated to League 1
14	Workington Town	27	1	0	26	296	1139	−843	2	Relegated to League 1

=== Player appearances ===
FB=Fullback	C=Centre	W=Winger	SO=Stand Off	SH=Scrum half	P=Prop	H=Hooker	SR=Second Row	LF=Loose forward	B=Bench

No	Player	1	2	3	5	6	7	4	8	9	10	11	12	13	14	15	16	17	18	19	20	21	22	23	24	25	26	27
1	Elliot Kear	FB			FB	FB	FB	FB	FB	C	W	FB		FB		C	FB	FB	FB	W	W	SO		FB	FB	FB	FB	FB
2	Matty Dawson-Jones	W	FB	W		C	W	W	W	W	C	C	C	C	C		C			W		W	W	W	W	W	W	W
3	Rhys Evans	C	C	C	B															C	C	C	x	C	C	C	C	
4	Kieran Gill	C	C	C	C	C	C	C	C	C	C	C	C	C	C	C	C	C	C	C	C	C	C	C	C	C	C	C
5	Ryan Millar	x	W	FB	W	W	W	W	W					W	W	W	W	W	W	x	W	W	W	W	W	W		
6	Declan Patton	SH	SH	SH	SO	SO	SO	SO	SO	SO	SO	SO	SO	SO	SO	SO	SO	SO	SO	SO	SO	SH	SO	Red card	Red card	Red card	Red card	Red card
7	Jordan Lilley				SH	SH	SH	SH	SH	SH	SH	SH	SH	SH	SH		SH	SH	SH	SH	SH							
8	Anthony Walker	P	P	P	P	P					B	B	B			B	B	B	B	B	B	B	B	B	B	P	P	
9	Thomas Doyle	L	L	H	H	H	H	H	H	H	H	H	H	H	H	H	H	H	H	H	H	H	H	B	Red card	Red card	B	H
10	Steve Crossley	P	P	P	P	B		P	P	P	P	P	x	B	B	P	P	P	P	P	P	P	P	P	P	P	P	P
11	Aaron Murphy				C	SR	C	C	C	SR								C	C	SR	B	B	SR	L	L		SR	SR
12	Sam Scott	x	x	SR	SR				SR																			
13	Ben Evans		B	L		P	B	B	B	B	B		B	L	L	B			B	P	P	P						
14	George Flanagan	H	H	B	B	B	B	B						B	B	B	B	B	B	B	B	B	B	H	H	H	H	
15	Jordan Baldwinson	B	B	B	x	B	P	L	P	P	P	P	P	P	P	B	B	B	P	B								B
16	Ebon Scurr				B		P	P	B		B	B	B	B	B	P	P	P						P	P			P
17	Brad England	SR	SR	SR	x	x	SR	SR		SR		B	SR	SR						B	SR	SR		B	B	SR		SR
18	Samy Kibula			x	x	x	B	x	B	B	B	x	– (Note: On loan at Dewsbury Rams)	B	SR		B	SR	SR	x	x	x	B	x	x	B	B	x
19	David Foggin-Johnston	W	W	W	Red card	Red card	Red card	– (Note: On loan at Midlands Hurricanes)		W		x	W	x	x	W	W	W	W	x	x	x	x	x	x	x	W	W
20	Billy Jowitt	SO	SO	SO			x	x	x	x	x	x	x	x	x	x	x	x	x									
21	Elliot Hall				x	x	B	B	B	FB	FB	W	FB		FB	– (Note: On loan at Dewsbury Rams)									– (Note: On loan at Doncaster R.L.F.C.)			
22	Joe Burton	x	x	x	x	x	x	x	– (Note: On loan at Cornwall R.L.F.C.)		W	W	W	W	W	x	x	B	x	x	x	FB	FB	x	x	x	x	C
23	Bradley Ho	– (Note: On loan at Keighley Cougars)																x	x	x	x	x	x	x	x	x	x	x
24	A.J. Wallace	SR	SR	B	x	x	L	x	x	B	SR	SR	SR	SR	SR		SR	SR	SR	x	x	x	SR	SR	SR	B	B	B
25	Muizz Mustapha	B	– (Note: At Leeds Rhinos)			B	– (Note: At Leeds Rhinos)	B	– (Note: At Leeds Rhinos)			B	P	P	P	Red card	Red card	Red card	Red card	– (Note: At Leeds Rhinos)			P	– (Note: At Leeds Rhinos)				
26	Corey Johnson	B	B	– (Note: At Leeds Rhinos)												SH	– (Note: At Leeds Rhinos)											
27	Eldon Myers	x	x	x	x	x	x	x	x	x	x	x	x	x	x	x	x	x	x	x	x	x	x	x	x	x	x	x
28	Jarrod O'Connor	– (Note: At Leeds Rhinos)			L	L	– (Note: At Leeds Rhinos)																					
29	Dan Fleming	B	B	Red card	B														B	– (Note: Signed for Featherstone Rovers)								
30	Chester Butler	– (Note: At Huddersfield Giants)		B	SR	SR	SR	SR	SR			SR				SR	SR			SR	SR	SR	C	SR	SR	SR	SR	
31	Liam Tindall	– (Note: At Leeds Rhinos)			W	W	– (Note: At Leeds Rhinos)																					
32	Sam Hallas	– (Note: Was at Newcastle Thunder)							L	L	L	L	L	Red card	Red card	L	L	L	L	L	L	L	L	SO	SO	SO	L	L
33	Sam Walters	– (Note: Was at Leeds Rhinos)								B	SR			– (Note: Was at Leeds Rhinos)														
34	Tom Holroyd	– (Note: Was at Leeds Rhinos)											B	– (Note: Was at Leeds Rhinos)														
35	Michael Hoyle	x	x	x	x	x	x	x	x	x	x	x	x	x	B	x	x	x	x	x	x	x	x	x	x	x	x	B
36	Brandon Pickersgill	– (Note: Was at Featherstone Rovers)														FB	– (Note: Was at Featherstone Rovers)											
38	Alex Mellor	– (Note: Was at Leeds Rhinos)														SR	– (Note: Signed for Castleford Tigers)											
39	Myles Lawford	x	x	x	x	x	x	x	x	x	x	x	x	x	x	x	x	x	x	x	x	x	SH	SH	SH	x	SH	
40	George Flanagan Jr	x	x	x	x	x	x	x	x	x	x	x	x	x	x	x	x	x	x	FB	FB	x	x	x	x	x	x	x
41	Jacob Gannon	– (Note: Was at Leeds Rhinos)																			B	B	B	B	B	L		
43	Marcus Green	x	x	x	x	x	x	x	x	x	x	x	x	x	B	x	x	x	x	x	x	x	x	x	x	B	B	B
44	David Gibbons	– (Note: Was at Leeds Rhinos)																								SH	– (Note: Was at Leeds Rhinos)	SH
45	Jacob Hookem	– (Note: Was at Hull F.C.)																							B	B	SO	SO

= Injured

= Suspended

== Challenge Cup ==
LEGEND
Win
Draw
Loss

Date	Competition	Rnd	Vrs	H/A	Venue	Result	Score	Tries	Goals	Att	TV	Report
27 February 2022	Challenge Cup	4th	London Broncos	A	Plough Lane	W	34-8	Gill (3), Flanagan, Millar, Scott	Patton 5/6	Attendance	-	Report
14 March 2022	Challenge Cup	5th	Leigh Centurions	H	Odsal Stadium	L	16-20	Dawson-Jones, Gill	Patton 4/4	Not Announced	Premier Sports	Report

=== Player appearances ===
FB=Fullback	C=Centre	W=Winger	SO=Stand Off	SH=Scrum half	P=Prop	H=Hooker	SR=Second Row	LF=Loose forward	B=Bench

No	Player	4th	5th
1	Elliot Kear	SO	FB
2	Matty Dawson-Jones	W	W
3	Rhys Evans	C	B
4	Kieran Gill	C	C
5	Ryan Millar	W	W
6	Declan Patton	SH	SO
7	Jordan Lilley		SH
8	Anthony Walker	P	P
9	Thomas Doyle	H	H
10	Steve Crossley	P	
11	Aaron Murphy		C
12	Sam Scott	SR	SR
13	Ben Evans	L	P
14	George Flanagan	B	B
15	Jordan Baldwinson	x	L
16	Ebon Scurr	B	B
17	Brad England	x	
18	Samy Kibula	B	B
19	David Foggin-Johnston	Red card	Red card
20	Billy Jowitt		
21	Elliot Hall	FB	x
22	Joe Burton	x	x
23	Bradley Ho	– (Note: On loan at Keighley Cougars)	
24	A.J. Wallace	x	x
25	Muizz Mustapha	– (Note: Was at Leeds Rhinos)	
26	Corey Johnson	– (Note: Was at Leeds Rhinos)	
27	Eldon Myers	x	x
28	Jarrod O'Connor	– (Note: Was at Leeds Rhinos)	
29	Dan Fleming	B	
30	Chester Butler	SR	SR

== Club vs Country ==
Date and time	Versus	H/A	Venue	Result	Score	Tries	Goals	Attendance	TV	Report
8 October, 15:00	Greece	H	Odsal Stadium	D	34–34					

== Squad statistics ==
- Appearances and points include (Championship, Challenge Cup and Play-offs) as of 11 September 2022.

No	Player	Position	Age	Previous club	Apps	Tries	Goals	DG	Points
1	Elliot Kear	Fullback	33	Salford Red Devils	24	4	10	0	36
2	Matty Dawson-Jones	Wing	31	Hull F.C.	24	6	0	0	24
3	Rhys Evans	Centre	29	Leeds Rhinos	13	1	0	0	4
4	Kieran Gill	Centre	26	Newcastle Thunder	29	18	0	0	72
5	Ryan Millar	Wing	28	Sheffield Eagles	21	8	0	0	32
6	Declan Patton	Scrum half	26	Salford Red Devils	24	2	85	0	178
7	Jordan Lilley	Scrum half	25	Leeds Rhinos	17	2	0	2	10
8	Anthony Walker	Prop	30	Retirement	22	0	0	0	0
9	Thomas Doyle	Hooker	23	Bradford Bulls Academy	27	7	0	0	28
10	Steve Crossley	Prop	32	Toronto Wolfpack	26	3	0	0	12
11	Aaron Murphy	Second row	33	Huddersfield Giants	17	2	0	0	8
12	Sam Scott	Second row	31	York City Knights	5	2	0	0	8
13	Ben Evans	Prop	29	Toulouse Olympique	18	0	0	0	0
14	George Flanagan	Hooker	35	Hunslet R.L.F.C.	23	6	0	1	25
15	Jordan Baldwinson	Prop	27	York City Knights	20	1	0	0	4
16	Ebon Scurr	Prop	21	Bradford Bulls Academy	17	1	0	0	4
17	Brad England	Second row	26	Doncaster R.L.F.C.	16	0	0	0	0
18	Samy Kibula	Prop	22	Warrington Wolves	14	2	0	0	8
19	David Foggin-Johnston	Wing	25	Hunslet R.L.F.C.	11	4	0	0	16
20	Billy Jowitt	Stand off	20	Bradford Bulls Academy	3	0	0	0	0
21	Elliot Hall	Fullback	24	Batley Bulldogs	9	3	0	0	12
22	Joe Burton	Centre	19	Bradford Bulls Academy	9	4	0	0	16
23	Bradley Ho	Prop	20	Bradford Bulls Academy	0	0	0	0	0
24	A.J. Wallace	Prop	n/a	Leeds Rhinos	19	5	0	0	20
25	Muizz Mustapha	Prop	21	Leeds Rhinos (Loan)	8	0	0	0	0
26	Corey Johnson	Hooker	21	Leeds Rhinos (Loan)	3	1	0	0	4
27	Eldon Myers	Centre	25	Unattached	0	0	0	0	0
28	Jarrod O'Connor	Loose forward	21	Leeds Rhinos (Loan)	2	0	0	0	0
29	Dan Fleming	Prop	29	Castleford Tigers	5	0	0	0	0
30	Chester Butler	Second row	26	Huddersfield Giants (Loan)	19	6	0	0	24
31	Liam Tindall	Wing	20	Leeds Rhinos (Loan)	2	2	0	0	8
32	Sam Hallas	Loose forward	25	Newcastle Thunder	18	2	0	0	8
33	Sam Walters	Second row	21	Leeds Rhinos (Loan)	2	0	0	0	0
34	Tom Holroyd	Prop	21	Leeds Rhinos (Loan)	1	0	0	0	0
35	Michael Hoyle	Prop	n/a	Army	2	0	0	0	0
36	Brandon Pickersgill	Fullback	25	Featherstone Rovers (Loan)	1	1	0	0	4
38	Alex Mellor	Second row	27	Leeds Rhinos (Loan)	1	0	0	0	0
39	Myles Lawford	Scrum half	17	Bradford Bulls Academy	4	1	0	0	4
40	George Flanagan Jr	Fullback	17	Bradford Bulls Academy	2	1	0	0	4
41	Jacob Gannon	Prop	n/a	Leeds Rhinos (Loan)	6	0	0	0	0
43	Marcus Green	Prop	n/a	Bradford Bulls Academy	3	0	0	0	0
44	David Gibbons	Scrum half	n/a	Leeds Rhinos (Loan)	2	0	0	0	0
45	Jacob Hookem	Hooker	n/a	Hull F.C. (Loan)	4	0	0	0	0

== Transfers ==
=== In ===
	Name	Position	Signed from	Date
(England)	Kieran Gill	Centre	Newcastle Thunder	September 2021
(England)	Jordan Baldwinson	Prop	York City Knights	September 2021
(England)	Declan Patton	Scrum half	Salford Red Devils	September 2021
(Republic of the Congo)	Samy Kibula	Prop	Warrington Wolves	October 2021
(England)	Elliot Hall	Fullback	Batley Bulldogs	October 2021
(England)	Ryan Millar	Wing	Sheffield Eagles	October 2021
(England)	Sam Scott	Second row	York City Knights	October 2021
(England)	Coby Nichol	Centre	Leeds Rhinos	November 2021
(England)	AJ Wallace	Prop	Leeds Rhinos	November 2021
(England)	Jamie Pye	Prop	St Helens R.F.C.	November 2021
(England)	Jarrod O'Connor	Loose forward	Leeds Rhinos (Loan)	December 2021
(England)	Corey Johnson	Hooker	Leeds Rhinos (Loan)	December 2021
(Nigeria)	Muizz Mustapha	Prop	Leeds Rhinos (Loan)	December 2021
(England)	Chester Butler	Second row	Huddersfield Giants (Loan)	February 2022
(England)	Sam Hallas	Loose forward	Newcastle Thunder	April 2022
(England)	Sam Walters	Second row	Leeds Rhinos (Loan)	April 2022

=== Out ===
	Name	Position	Club Signed	Date
(Republic of the Congo)	Levy Nzoungou	Prop	Widnes Vikings	September 2021
(England)	Joe Brown	Wing	York City Knights	September 2021
(England)	Reece Hamlett	Centre	Swinton Lions	September 2021
(England)	Jack Sanderson	Wing	Doncaster R.L.F.C.	September 2021
(England)	Brad Gallagher	Second row	Newcastle Thunder	October 2021
(England)	Brandon Pickersgill	Fullback	Featherstone Rovers	October 2021
(England)	Ethan O'Hanlon	Prop	Hunslet R.L.F.C.	October 2021
(England)	Cameron Berry	Hooker	Hunslet R.L.F.C.	October 2021
(England)	Danny Brough	Scrum half	Retirement	November 2021
(England)	Ross Oakes	Centre	Sheffield Eagles	November 2021
(England)	Sam Hallas	Loose forward	Newcastle Thunder	November 2021
(England)	Jamie Pye	Prop	Oldham R.L.F.C.	December 2021
(England)	Adam Rooks	Second row	Released	December 2021
(England)	Matthew Race	Stand off	Released	December 2021
(England)	Murphy Smith	Wing	Released	December 2021
(England)	Sam Smith	Centre	Released	December 2021
(England)	Bradley Ho	Prop	Keighley Cougars (Loan)	February 2022
