= 2022 Leeds Rhinos season =

- Super League Rank: 5
- Challenge Cup: Sixth Round
- 2022 record: Wins: 14; draws: 1; losses: 13
- Points scored: For: 577; against: 528

Team information
- Chairman: (England) Paul Caddick
- Head Coach: Richard Agar (until March 2022); Jamie Jones-Buchanan (interim); Rohan Smith (from April 2022)
- Captain: Kruise Leeming & Ash Handley
- Stadium: Headingley; Leeds, United Kingdom
- Avg. attendance: 12,382
- High attendance: 15,418 (v Castleford Tigers)

Top scorers
- Tries: (England) Ash Handley (17)
- Goals: (Papua New Guinea) Rhyse Martin (84)
- Points: (Papua New Guinea) Rhyse Martin (212)
← 2021	List of seasons	2023 →

This article details the Leeds Rhinos's rugby league football club's 2022 season. They were coached by Richard Agar until May 2022, Jamie Jones-Buchanan as an interim coach and Rohan Smith from April 2022 onwards. The Rhinos competed in both the 2022 Betfred Super League and the 2022 Challenge Cup.

== Season review ==
On 12 February, Leeds began their Super League campaign with a 22–20 loss to Warrington Wolves followed by losses at Wigan Warriors and at home to Catalans Dragons before their first win came in Round 4 with a 34–18 victory at Wakefield Trinity. Leeds had an early exit from the Challenge Cup with a 40–16 defeat by Castleford Tigers, and their run of poor results leading to the departure of Richard Agar as head coach meant that by mid-April Leeds were 11th in the table. Interim head coach Jamie Jones-Buchanan oversaw wins against Toulouse Olympique and Hull Kingston Rovers before the arrival of the newly appointed Rohan Smith. Towards the end of the season, Leeds went on a run of six wins before suffering a 32–18 loss to Catalans Dragons at the end of August. It meant that to qualify for the play-offs Leeds needed to avoid defeat in the final round of the regular season against Castleford, which they achieved with two late tries that gave them a 14–8 victory.

Leeds began their play-off campaign by travelling to Perpignan where a hat-trick by Liam Sutcliffe gave them a 20–10 win over Catalans Dragons. Leeds faced Wigan in the semi-final. At half time the score was 4–2 to Wigan, but a try from Jarrod O'Connor (his first for Leeds) and two from James Bentley saw Leeds reach their 11th Grand Final with a 20–8 win. The Grand Final took place on 24 September at Old Trafford where Leeds lost 24–12 to St Helens.

== Results ==
=== Pre-season friendlies ===
W Win L Loss

Pre-season results
Date	Versus	H/A	Venue	Result	Score	Tries	Goals	Attendance	Report
26 December 2021	Wakefield Trinity	H	Headingley	W	34–6				
23 January	Bradford Bulls	A	Odsal Stadium	W	30–12			7,237	
30 January	Hull F.C.	A	Headingley	W	38–6				(Note: Tom Briscoe Testimonial)
6 February	Hunslet	A	South Leeds Stadium	L	6–34	McConnell	Sinfield		(Note: Harry Jepson OBE Memorial Cup)

=== Super League ===
==== Table ====
Pos	Team	Pld	W	D	L	PF	PA	PD	Pts	Qualification
1	St Helens (C, L)	27	21	0	6	674	374	+300	42	Advance to semi-finals
2	Wigan Warriors	27	19	0	8	818	483	+335	38	Advance to semi-finals
3	Huddersfield Giants	27	17	1	9	613	497	+116	35	Advance to elimination finals
4	Catalans Dragons	27	16	0	11	539	513	+26	32	Advance to elimination finals
5	Leeds Rhinos	27	14	1	12	577	528	+49	29	Advance to elimination finals
6	Salford Red Devils	27	14	0	13	700	602	+98	28	Advance to elimination finals
7	Castleford Tigers	27	13	0	14	544	620	−76	26	
8	Hull Kingston Rovers	27	12	0	15	498	608	−110	24	
9	Hull FC	27	11	0	16	508	675	−167	22	
10	Wakefield Trinity	27	10	0	17	497	648	−151	20	
11	Warrington Wolves	27	9	0	18	568	664	−96	18	
12	Toulouse Olympique (R)	27	5	0	22	421	745	−324	10	Relegated to the Championship

(C) Champions; (L) League Leaders' Shield winners; (R) Relegated

==== Super League results ====
W Win D Draw L Loss

Super League results
Date	Round	Versus	H/A	Venue	Result	Score	Tries	Goals	Attendance	Report
12 February	1	Warrington Wolves	H	Headingley	L	20–22	Handley, Prior, Tetevano	Martin (4)	14,135	RLP
18 February	2	Wigan Warriors	A	DW Stadium	L	12–34	Austin, Prior	Sezer (2)	12,575	RLP
24 February	3	Catalans Dragons	H	Headingley	L	4–10	Austin		10,655	RLP
3 March	4	Wakefield Trinity	A	Be Well Support Stadium	W	34–18	Handley (3), Fusitu'a, Gannon, Newman	Martin (5)	5,040	RLP
10 March	5	Hull FC	H	Headingley	L	8–31	Briscoe, Sutcliffe		11,552	RLP
18 March	6	Salford Red Devils	A	AJ Bell Stadium	L	12–26	Handley, Oledzki	Martin (2)	5,756	RLP
1 April	7	St Helens	H	Headingley	L	0–26			6,519	RLP
14 April	8	Huddersfield Giants	H	Headingley	D	20–20	Gannon, Martin, Sutcliffe	Martin (4)	11,286	RLP
18 April	9	Castleford Tigers	A	Mend-A-Hose Jungle	L	14–16	Martin (2)	Martin (3)	9,372	RLP
22 April	10	Toulouse Olympique	H	Headingley	W	25–14	Dwyer (2), Briscoe, Donaldson	Martin (4)	11,167	RLP
29 April	11	Hull KR	H	Headingley	W	12–0	Gannon, Prior	Martin (2)	13,333	RLP
15 May	12	Salford Red Devils	A	AJ Bell Stadium	L	8–23	Handley, Oledzki		4,473	RLP
20 May	13	Wakefield Trinity	H	Headingley	W	24–6	Bentley (2), Austin, Fusitu'a	Martin (4)	14,190	RLP
3 June	14	Warrington Wolves	A	Halliwell Jones Stadium	W	40–4	Fusitu'a (2), Handley (2), Donaldson, Hardaker, Leeming, Thompson	Martin (4)	9,984	RLP
10 June	15	Huddersfield Giants	A	John Smiths Stadium	L	16–30	Handley, Hardaker, Sutcliffe	Martin (2)	6,712	RLP
23 June	16	St Helens	A	Totally Wicked Stadium	L	12–42	Newman, Thompson	Martin (2)	11,288	RLP
2 July	17	Hull FC	A	MKM Stadium	W	62–16	Handley (5), Leeming (2), Fusitu'a, Myler, Oledzki, Sutcliffe	Martin (9)	10,682	RLP
9 July	18	Castleford Tigers	N	St James' Park	W	34–20	Bentley, Handley, Myler, Prior, Sezer, Sutcliffe	Martin (5)	36,821	RLP
16 July	19	Toulouse Olympique	A	Stade Ernest Wallon	L	6–20	Dwyer	Martin	4,230	RLP
21 July	20	Wigan Warriors	H	Headingley	W	42–12	Bentley, Dwyer, Martin, Mustapha, Newman, Smith, Sutcliffe	Martin (7)	13,368	RLP
30 July	21	Catalans Dragons	A	Stade Gilbert Brutus	W	36–32	Myler (3), Dwyer, Sezer, Sutcliffe	Martin (6)	8,165	RLP
7 August	22	Salford Red Devils	H	Headingley	W	34–14	Martin (2), Handley, Myler, Newman	Martin (7)	14,668	RLP
12 August	23	Hull Kingston Rovers	A	Sewell Group Craven Park	W	28–20	Gannon (2), Myler (2), Dwyer	Hardaker (4)	8,028	RLP
19 August	24	Warrington Wolves	H	Headingley	W	24–18	Gannon, Handley, Martin, Tetevano	Martin (4)	13,152	RLP
24 August	25	Huddersfield Giants	H	Headingley	W	18–14	Austin, Martin, Myler	Martin (3)	11,225	RLP
29 August	26	Catalans Dragons	A	Stade Gilbert Brutus	L	18–32	Dwyer, Myler, Walters	Martin (3)	9,802	RLP
3 September	27	Castleford Tigers	H	Headingley	W	14–8	Sutcliffe (3)	Hardaker (4)	15,418	RLP

==== Play-offs ====
Play-off results
Date	Round	Versus	H/A	Venue	Result	Score	Tries	Goals	Attendance	Report
10 September	Eliminators	Catalans Dragons	A	Stade Gilbert Brutus	W	20–10	Sutcliffe(3)	Hardaker (4)	9,514	RLP
16 September	Semi-finals	Wigan Warriors	A	DW Stadium	W	20–8	Bentley (2), O'Connor	Hardaker (4)	12,777	RLP
24 September	Grand Final	St Helens	N	Old Trafford	L	12–24	Leeming, Martin	Martin (2)	60,783	RLP

===== Team bracket =====
Eliminators
4	Catalans Dragons	10
5	Leeds Rhinos	20
3	Huddersfield Giants	0
6	Salford Red Devils	28

Semi-finals
2	Wigan Warriors	8
5	Leeds Rhinos	20
1	St Helens	19
6	Salford Red Devils	12

Grand Final
5	Leeds Rhinos	12
1	St Helens	24

Source:Rugby League Project

=== Challenge Cup ===
W Win L Loss

Challenge Cup results
Date	Round	Versus	H/A	Venue	Result	Score	Tries	Goals	Attendance	Report
26 March	6	Castleford Tigers	H	Headingley	L	16–40	Martin (2), Sutcliffe	Martin (2)	5,112	RLP

=== Club vs Country ===
W Win L Loss

Date	Versus	H/A	Venue	Result	Score	Tries	Goals	Attendance	Report
8 October	New Zealand	H	Headingley	L	0–74			9,125	RLP

== Players ==
=== Squad ===
Leeds Rhinos 2022 Squad
First team squad			Coaching staff
1 (England) Jack Walker – FB; 2 (Tonga) David Fusitu'a – WG; 3 (England) Harry Newman – CE; 4 (England) Liam Sutcliffe – CE, SO, FB; 5 (England) Ash Handley – WG; 6 (United Kingdom) Blake Austin – SO; 7 (Turkey) Aidan Sezer – SH; 8 (England) Mikolaj Olędzki – PR; 9 (England) Kruise Leeming – HK; 10 (Australia) Matt Prior (c) – PR; 11 (Ireland) James Bentley – SR; 12 (Papua New Guinea) Rhyse Martin – SR, CE; 13 (Cook Islands) Zane Tetevano – PR, LF	14 (England) Brad Dwyer – HK; 15; 16 (England) Richie Myler – FB, SH; 17 (England) Cameron Smith – LF; 18 (England) Tom Holroyd – PR; 19 (New Zealand) Bodene Thompson – SR, PR; 20 (England) Tom Briscoe – CE, WG; 21 (England) Morgan Gannon – SR; 22 (England) Sam Walters – PR; 23 (England) Jack Broadbent – CE, FB; 24 (England) Jarrod O'Connor – HK, LF; 25 (England) James Donaldson – SR, LF; 26 (England) Corey Johnson – HK, SO, SH	27 (Nigeria) Muizz Mustapha – PR; 28 (England) Max Simpson – CE; 29 (England) Liam Tindall – WG, SO; 30 (England) Levi Edwards – SR; 31 (England) Oli Field – SO, LF; 32 (England) Jack Sinfield – SO, SH; 33 (England) Zak Hardaker – FB, CE	Head coach: Rohan Smith; Assistant coaches: Sean Long; Jamie Jones Buchanan; Legend: (c) Captain(s); (vc) Vice-captain(s); Updated: 20 April 2022; Source(s): 2022 Squad Numbers

=== Transfers ===
==== Gains ====
Player	Club	Contract length	Date
(Ireland) James Bentley	St Helens	2 Years	June 2021
(Turkey) Aidan Sezer	Huddersfield Giants	2 Years	July 2021
(United Kingdom) Blake Austin	Warrington Wolves	1 Year	August 2021
(Tonga) David Fusitu’a	New Zealand Warriors	2 Years	October 2021

==== Losses ====
Player	Club	Contract length	Date
(England) Stevie Ward	Retired	—N/a	January 2021
(England) Kyle Eastmond	Retired	—N/a	May 2021
(England) Alex Sutcliffe	Castleford Tigers	2 Years	September 2021
(Scotland) Callum McLelland	Castleford Tigers	2 Years	October 2021
(Fiji) King Vuniyayawa	Salford Red Devils	2 Years	October 2021
(Tonga) Konrad Hurrell	St Helens	1 Year	October 2021
(England) Luke Briscoe	Featherstone Rovers	1 Year	October 2021
(Australia) Robert Lui	North Queensland Cowboys	1 Year	November 2021
(England) Luke Gale	Hull FC	1 Year	November 2021
(England) Corey Hall	Wakefield Trinity	1 Year	November 2021
(England) Corey Johnson	Bradford Bulls	1 Year Loan	December 2021
(Nigeria) Muizz Mustapha	Bradford Bulls	1 Year Loan	December 2021
(England) Jarrod O'Connor	Bradford Bulls	1 Year Loan	December 2021
