= 2022 Super League season results =

2022 British rugby league results

Super League XXVII was the 2022 season of the Super League, and 127th season of rugby league in Great Britain. The season began on 10 February 2022.

The full fixture list was released on 25 November 2021, with defending champions St Helens, starting their title defence against the prior year's finalists Catalans Dragons (a repeat of the 2021 Super League Grand Final), whilst Huddersfield Giants were set to take on newly promoted Toulouse Olympique.

All times (including matches played in France) are UK local time; GMT (UTC±00:00) until 26 March, BST (UTC+01:00) thereafter.

== Regular season ==
=== Round 1 ===
Home	Score	Away	Match information
Home	Score	Away	Date and time (GMT)	Venue	Referee	Attendance
St Helens	28–8	Catalans Dragons	10 February 2022, 20:00	Totally Wicked Stadium	Liam Moore	13,108
Castleford Tigers	16–26	Salford Red Devils	11 February 2022, 20:00	The Mend-A-Hose Jungle	Tom Grant	10,500
Hull KR	10–24	Wigan Warriors	11 February 2022, 20:00	Hull College Craven Park	James Child	9,044
Leeds Rhinos	20–22	Warrington Wolves	12 February 2022, 12:30	Headingley Stadium	Chris Kendall	14,135
Toulouse Olympique	14–42	Huddersfield Giants	12 February 2022, 19:00	Stade Ernest Wallon	Robert Hicks	5,238
Wakefield Trinity	12–16	Hull FC	13 February 2022, 15:00	The Mobile Rocket Stadium	Marcus Griffiths	6,148

=== Round 2 ===
Home	Score	Away	Match information
Home	Score	Away	Date and time (GMT)	Venue	Referee	Attendance
Warrington Wolves	34–10	Castleford Tigers	17 February 2022, 20:00	Halliwell Jones Stadium	James Child	8,468
Wigan Warriors	34–12	Leeds Rhinos	18 February 2022, 20:00	DW Stadium	Liam Moore	12,575
Hull FC	6–38	St Helens	19 February 2022, 12:30	MKM Stadium	Chris Kendall	12,673
Huddersfield Giants	26–12	Hull Kingston Rovers	19 February 2022, 15:00	John Smiths Stadium	Robert Hicks	5,724
Catalans Dragons	24–22	Wakefield Trinity	19 February 2022, 17:00	Stade Gilbert Brutus	Tom Grant	7,623
Salford Red Devils	38–12	Toulouse Olympique	20 February 2022, 15:00	AJ Bell Stadium	Marcus Griffiths	4,003

=== Round 3 ===
Home	Score	Away	Match information
Home	Score	Away	Date and time (GMT)	Venue	Referee	Attendance
Leeds Rhinos	4–10	Catalans Dragons	24 February 2022, 20:00	Headingley Stadium	Jack Smith	10,655
Wigan Warriors	22–12	Huddersfield Giants	24 February 2022, 20:00	DW Stadium	Tom Grant	10,291
Hull KR	26–10	Castleford Tigers	25 February 2022, 20:00	Hull College Craven Park	Liam Moore	7,119
St Helens	20–4	Wakefield Trinity	25 February 2022, 20:00	Totally Wicked Stadium	Aaron Moore	10,361
Hull FC	48–16	Salford Red Devils	26 February 2022, 15:00	MKM Stadium	Robert Hicks	10,081
Toulouse Olympique	18–32	Warrington Wolves	26 February 2022, 17:00	Stade Ernest Wallon	Chris Kendall	4,887

=== Round 4 ===
Home	Score	Away	Match information
Home	Score	Away	Date and time (GMT)	Venue	Referee	Attendance
Wakefield Trinity	18–34	Leeds Rhinos	3 March 2022, 20:00	The Mobile Rocket Stadium	Chris Kendall	5,040
Hull KR	8–42	St Helens	4 March 2022, 20:00	Hull College Craven Park	James Child	7,256
Warrington Wolves	18–24	Catalans Dragons	4 March 2022, 20:00	Halliwell Jones Stadium	Liam Moore	9,295
Toulouse Olympique	28–29	Wigan Warriors	5 March 2022, 17:00	Stade Ernest Wallon	Aaron Moore	5,466
Huddersfield Giants	34–2	Salford Red Devils	6 March 2022, 15:00	John Smiths Stadium	Tom Grant	5,702
Castleford Tigers	33–26	Hull FC	6 March 2022, 15:30	The Mend-A-Hose Jungle	Robert Hicks	10,072

=== Round 5 ===
Home	Score	Away	Match information
Home	Score	Away	Date and time (GMT)	Venue	Referee	Attendance
Leeds Rhinos	8–31	Hull FC	10 March 2022, 20:00	Headingley Stadium	Liam Moore	11,552
Wakefield Trinity	18–6	Toulouse Olympique	11 March 2022, 19:30	The Mobile Rocket Stadium	Tom Grant	4,351
Salford Red Devils	16–26	Hull KR	11 March 2022, 19:45	AJ Bell Stadium	Jack Smith	3,950
St Helens	28–2	Warrington Wolves	11 March 2022, 20:00	Totally Wicked Stadium	Chris Kendall	16,118
Huddersfield Giants	36–24	Castleford Tigers	12 March 2022, 15:15	John Smiths Stadium	James Child	5,717
Catalans Dragons	28–0	Wigan Warriors	12 March 2022, 17:00	Stade Gilbert Brutus	Robert Hicks	7,481

=== Round 6 ===
Home	Score	Away	Match information
Home	Score	Away	Date and time (GMT)	Venue	Referee	Attendance
Wigan Warriors	32–22	Castleford Tigers	17 March 2022, 20:00	DW Stadium	Chris Kendall	10,042
Catalans Dragons	18–10	Hull KR	18 March 2022, 19:30	Stade Gilbert Brutus	Tom Grant	6,782
Salford Red Devils	26–12	Leeds Rhinos	18 March 2022, 20:00	AJ Bell Stadium	Jack Smith	5,756
Warrington Wolves	22–38	Wakefield Trinity	19 March 2022, 12:30	Halliwell Jones Stadium	Robert Hicks	8,164
Toulouse Olympique	22–20	St Helens	19 March 2022, 17:00	Stade Ernest Wallon	James Child	5,568
Hull FC	14–6	Huddersfield Giants	20 March 2022, 15:00	MKM Stadium	Liam Moore	10,682

=== Round 7 ===
Home	Score	Away	Match information
Home	Score	Away	Date and time (GMT)	Venue	Referee	Attendance
Wigan Warriors	19–18	Hull FC	31 March 2022, 20:00	DW Stadium	Robert Hicks	9,581
Castleford Tigers	32–6	Toulouse Olympique	1 April 2022, 20:00	The Mend-A-Hose Jungle	Marcus Griffiths	7,067
Hull KR	34–18	Warrington Wolves	1 April 2022, 20:00	Hull College Craven Park	Liam Moore	10,069
Leeds Rhinos	0–26	St Helens	1 April 2022, 20:00	Headingley	James Child	14,083
Huddersfield Giants	28-12	Catalans Dragons	1 April 2022, 20:20 (Note: Kick off for this game was originally scheduled for 19:45, but due to severe transport disruption with the Catalans' team coach entering the UK, it was delayed by 35 minutes.)	John Smiths Stadium	Tom Grant	3,845
Wakefield Trinity	30–24	Salford Red Devils	3 April 2022, 15:00	The Be Well Support Stadium	Chris Kendall	4,371

=== Round 8 ===
(Maundy Thursday/Good Friday/Rivals Round)

Home	Score	Away	Match information
Home	Score	Away	Date and time (BST)	Venue	Referee	Attendance
Catalans Dragons	18–10	Toulouse Olympique	14 April 2022, 19:30	Stade Gilbert Brutus	Robert Hicks	8,922
Wakefield Trinity	4–34	Castleford Tigers	14 April 2022, 19:45	The Be Well Support Stadium	Chris Kendall	5,557
Leeds Rhinos	20–20 (Note: After golden-point extra time)	Huddersfield Giants	14 April 2022, 20:00	Headingley	Marcus Griffiths	11,286
Warrington Wolves	32–18	Salford Red Devils	14 April 2022, 20:00	Halliwell Jones Stadium	Jack Smith	8,486
Hull KR	16–4	Hull FC	15 April 2022, 12:30	Hull College Craven Park	James Child	10,300
St Helens	22-4	Wigan Warriors	15 April 2022, 15:00	Totally Wicked Stadium	Liam Moore	17,980

=== Round 9 ===
(Easter Monday)

Home	Score	Away	Match information
Home	Score	Away	Date and time (BST)	Venue	Referee	Attendance
Castleford Tigers	16–14	Leeds Rhinos	18 April 2022, 15:00	The Mend-A-Hose Jungle	Liam Moore	9,372
Huddersfield Giants	12–24	St Helens	18 April 2022, 15:00	John Smiths Stadium	Tom Grant	6,519
Salford Red Devils	10–36	Catalans Dragons	18 April 2022, 15:00	AJ Bell Stadium	James Child	3,221
Toulouse Olympique	24–28	Hull KR	18 April 2022, 15:00	Stade Ernest Wallon	Robert Hicks	6,180
Wigan Warriors	54–10	Wakefield Trinity	18 April 2022, 15:00	DW Stadium	Jack Smith	11,621
Hull FC	18–16	Warrington Wolves	18 April 2022, 17:30	MKM Stadium	Chris Kendall	9,726

=== Round 10 ===
Home	Score	Away	Match information
Home	Score	Away	Date and time (BST)	Venue	Referee	Attendance
Castleford Tigers	30–10	St Helens	22 April 2022, 20:00	The Mend-A-Hose Jungle	Jack Smith	7,649
Leeds Rhinos	25–14	Toulouse Olympique	22 April 2022, 20:00	Headingley	Tom Grant	11,167
Hull KR	32–10	Wakefield Trinity	23 April 2022, 15:00	Hull College Craven Park	Aaron Moore	7,058
Warrington Wolves	32–10	Huddersfield Giants	23 April 2022, 15:00	Halliwell Jones Stadium	Robert Hicks	8,102
Wigan Warriors	30–24	Salford Red Devils	24 April 2022, 13:00	DW Stadium	Marcus Griffiths	10,783
Hull FC	14–8	Catalans Dragons	24 April 2022, 18:45	MKM Stadium	James Child	9,101

=== Round 11 ===
Home	Score	Away	Match information
Home	Score	Away	Date and time (BST)	Venue	Referee	Attendance
Wakefield Trinity	12–14	Huddersfield Giants	28 April 2022, 20:00	The Be Well Support Stadium	Tom Grant	3,186
Catalans Dragons	44–12	Castleford Tigers	29 April 2022, 19:30	Stade Gilbert Brutus	Liam Moore	6,487
Leeds Rhinos	12–0	Hull KR	29 April 2022, 20:00	Headingley	James Child	13,333
St Helens	14–10	Salford Red Devils	29 April 2022, 20:00	Totally Wicked Stadium	Chris Kendall	10,988
Warrington Wolves	22–40	Wigan Warriors	29 April 2022, 20:00	Halliwell Jones Stadium	Robert Hicks	10,104
Hull FC	48–12	Toulouse Olympique	30 April 2022, 15:00	MKM Stadium	Marcus Griffiths	11,308

=== Round 12 ===
Home	Score	Away	Match information
Home	Score	Away	Date and time (BST)	Venue	Referee	Attendance
Huddersfield Giants	32–22	Wigan Warriors	12 May 2022, 20:00	John Smiths Stadium	Tom Grant	4,962
St Helens	24–10	Hull FC	13 May 2022, 20:00	Totally Wicked Stadium	Jack Smith	11,268
Catalans Dragons	40–8	Warrington Wolves	14 May 2022, 17:00	Stade Gilbert Brutus	Liam Moore	9,307
Toulouse Olympique	20–14	Wakefield Trinity	15 May 2022, 14:30	Stade Ernest Wallon	Marcus Griffiths	3,909
Salford Red Devils	23–8	Leeds Rhinos	15 May 2022, 15:00	AJ Bell Stadium	James Child	4,473
Castleford Tigers	32–0	Hull KR	15 May 2022, 15:30	The Mend-A-Hose Jungle	Chris Kendall	8,175

=== Round 13 ===
Home	Score	Away	Match information
Home	Score	Away	Date and time (BST)	Venue	Referee	Attendance
Warrington Wolves	10–12	St Helens	19 May 2022, 20:00	Halliwell Jones Stadium	James Child	10,476
Huddersfield Giants	17–16	Toulouse Olympique	20 May 2022, 19:45	John Smiths Stadium	Jack Smith	3,926
Leeds Rhinos	24–6	Wakefield Trinity	20 May 2022, 20:00	Headingley	Chris Kendall	14,190
Salford Red Devils	30–14	Castleford Tigers	20 May 2022, 20:00	AJ Bell Stadium	Robert Hicks	5,355
Hull KR	8–20	Catalans Dragons	21 May 2022, 12:30	Sewell Group Craven Park	Tom Grant	7,199
Hull FC	31–22	Wigan Warriors	21 May 2022, 15:00	MKM Stadium	Marcus Griffiths	11,496

=== Round 14 ===
Home	Score	Away	Match information
Home	Score	Away	Date and time (BST)	Venue	Referee	Attendance
Catalans Dragons	14–22	Huddersfield Giants	3 June 2022, 19:30	Stade Gilbert Brutus	Chris Kendall	7,240
Warrington Wolves	4–40	Leeds Rhinos	3 June May 2022, 20:00	Halliwell Jones Stadium	Jack Smith	9,984
Castleford Tigers	12–32	Wigan Warriors	4 June 2022, 14:00	The Mend-A-Hose Jungle	James Child	6,497
Toulouse Olympique	14–28	St Helens	4 June 2022, 17:00	Stade Ernest Wallon	Geoffrey Poummes (Note: Liam Moore had originally been scheduled to take charge of this game, but due to travel disruptions affecting flights from Manchester Airport, his flight was delayed by three hours, causing him to miss his connecting flight to Toulouse.)	5,225
Hull KR	43–16	Salford Red Devils	5 June 2022, 15:00	Sewell Group Craven Park	Tom Grant	7,023
Wakefield Trinity	19–18 (Note: After golden-point extra time)	Hull FC	5 June 2022, 15:00	The Be Well Support Stadium	Marcus Griffiths	4,426

=== Round 15 ===
Home	Score	Away	Match information
Home	Score	Away	Date and time (BST)	Venue	Referee	Attendance
Huddersfield Giants	30–16	Leeds Rhinos	10 June 2022, 19:45	John Smiths Stadium	Liam Moore	6,712
Salford Red Devils	12–30	Wigan Warriors	10 June 2022, 20:00	AJ Bell Stadium	Chris Kendall	5,944
Catalans Dragons	36–8	Hull FC	11 June 2022, 17:00	Stade Gilbert Brutus	Jack Smith	8,847
Toulouse Olympique	14–20	Castleford Tigers	12 June 2022, 14:30	Stade Ernest Wallon	James Child	3,326
St Helens	26–18	Hull KR	12 June 2022, 15:00	Totally Wicked Stadium	Marcus Griffiths	9,858
Wakefield Trinity	30–24	Warrington Wolves	12 June 2022, 15:00	The Be Well Support Stadium	Tom Grant	3,891

=== Round 16 ===
Home	Score	Away	Match information
Home	Score	Away	Date and time (BST)	Venue	Referee	Attendance
St Helens	42–12	Leeds Rhinos	23 June 2022, 20:00	Totally Wicked Stadium	Tom Grant	11,628
Warrington Wolves	4–0	Hull FC	24 June 2022, 20:00	Halliwell Jones Stadium	James Child	8,591
Wigan Warriors	40–6	Toulouse Olympique	24 June 2022, 20:00	DW Stadium	Liam Moore	14,493
Salford Red Devils	74–10	Wakefield Trinity	26 June 2022, 15:00	AJ Bell Stadium	Jack Smith	4,047
Hull KR	10–38	Huddersfield Giants	26 June 2022, 15:15	Sewell Group Craven Park	Chris Kendall	7,050
Castleford Tigers	17–16 (Note: After golden-point extra time)	Catalans Dragons	26 June 2022, 15:30	The Mend-A-Hose Jungle	Marcus Griffiths	6,510

=== Round 17 ===
Home	Score	Away	Match information
Home	Score	Away	Date and time (BST)	Venue	Referee	Attendance
Castleford Tigers	26–18	Huddersfield Giants	1 July 2022, 20:00	The Mend-A-Hose Jungle	Jack Smith	5,672
Hull FC	16–62	Leeds Rhinos	2 July 2022, 15:00	MKM Stadium	Liam Moore	10,360
Catalans Dragons	20–18	St Helens	2 July 2022, 17:00	Stade Gilbert Brutus	James Child	10,260
Toulouse Olympique	28–6	Hull KR	2 July 2022, 20:00	Stade Ernest Wallon	Marcus Griffiths	3,441
Wakefield Trinity	22–46	Wigan Warriors	3 July 2022, 15:00	The Be Well Support Stadium	Chris Kendall	7,046
Warrington Wolves	24–32	Salford Red Devils	3 July 2022, 15:00	Halliwell Jones Stadium	Robert Hicks	8,559

=== Round 18 (Magic Weekend) ===
Team A	Score	Team B	Match information
Team A	Score	Team B	Date and time (BST)	Venue	Referee	Attendance
Wakefield Trinity	26–38	Toulouse Olympique	9 July 2022, 14:30	St James' Park	Robert Hicks	36,821
St Helens	20–18	Wigan Warriors	9 July 2022, 16:45	St James' Park	Liam Moore	36,821
Leeds Rhinos	34–20	Castleford Tigers	9 July 2022, 19:00	St James' Park	Ben Thaler	36,821
Huddersfield Giants	30–18	Salford Red Devils	10 July 2022, 13:00	St James' Park	Marcus Griffiths	25,333
Catalans Dragons	10–36	Warrington Wolves	10 July 2022, 15:15	St James' Park	Jack Smith	25,333
Hull KR	28–34	Hull FC	10 July 2022, 17:30	St James' Park	Chris Kendall	25,333

=== Round 19 ===
Home	Score	Away	Match information
Home	Score	Away	Date and time (BST)	Venue	Referee	Attendance
St Helens	25–0	Huddersfield Giants	15 July 2022, 20:00	Totally Wicked Stadium	Chris Kendall	11,288
Wigan Warriors	60–0	Hull FC	15 July 2022, 20:00	DW Stadium	Robert Hicks	11,314
Castleford Tigers	35–22	Warrington Wolves	16 July 2022, 15:00	The Mend-A-Hose Jungle	Liam Moore	6,279
Toulouse Olympique	20–6	Leeds Rhinos	16 July 2022, 19:00 (Note: Kick off changed from 18:00 to 19:00, as a safety pre-caution, due to the heat wave in France, and the high temperatures forecast for the original kick off time.)	Stade Ernest Wallon	Jack Smith	4,230
Hull KR	15–10	Wakefield Trinity	17 July 2022, 15:00	Sewell Group Craven Park	Marcus Griffiths	7,029
Salford Red Devils	32–6	Catalans Dragons	17 July 2022, 15:00	AJ Bell Stadium	Ben Thaler	2,607

=== Round 20 ===
Home	Score	Away	Match information
Home	Score	Away	Date and time (BST)	Venue	Referee	Attendance
Leeds Rhinos	42–12	Wigan Warriors	21 July 2022, 20:00	Headingley	Liam Moore	13,368
Hull FC	18–46	Castleford Tigers	22 July 2022, 20:00	MKM Stadium	Chris Kendall	9,550
Warrington Wolves	22–30	Hull KR	22 July 2022, 20:00	Halliwell Jones Stadium	Jack Smith	7,551
Catalans Dragons	13–12	Huddersfield Giants	23 July 2022, 17:00	Stade Gilbert Brutus	James Child	6,845
Toulouse Olympique	11–24	Salford Red Devils	23 July 2022, 19:00	Stade Ernest Wallon	Robert Hicks	3,706
Wakefield Trinity	12–13 (Note: After golden-point extra time)	St Helens	24 July 2022, 15:00	The Be Well Support Stadium	Ben Thaler	4,162

=== Round 21 ===
Home	Score	Away	Match information
Home	Score	Away	Date and time (BST)	Venue	Referee	Attendance
Wigan Warriors	46–4	Hull KR	28 July 2022, 20:00	DW Stadium	Marcus Griffiths	11,032
Toulouse Olympique	6–30	Hull FC	29 July 2022, 18:00	Stade Ernest Wallon	Ben Thaler	4,238
Castleford Tigers	6–32	Wakefield Trinity	29 July 2022, 20:00	The Mend-A-Hose Jungle	Robert Hicks	6,796
Huddersfield Giants	32–22	Warrington Wolves	30 July 2022, 15:00	John Smiths Stadium	Tom Grant	4,549
Catalans Dragons	32–36 (Note: After golden-point extra time)	Leeds Rhinos	30 July 2022, 19:00	Stade Gilbert Brutus	Chris Kendall	8,165
Salford Red Devils	44–12	St Helens	31 July 2022, 15:00	AJ Bell Stadium	Jack Smith	6,041

=== Round 22 ===
Home	Score	Away	Match information
Home	Score	Away	Date and time (BST)	Venue	Referee	Attendance
Hull KR	22–16	Toulouse Olympique	4 August 2022, 20:00	Sewell Group Craven Park	Liam Moore	6,763
Huddersfield Giants	22–16	Hull FC	5 August 2022, 19:45	John Smiths Stadium	Marcus Griffiths	4,642
Wigan Warriors	32–6 (Note: This match was for the Locker Cup, which Wigan won.)	Warrington Wolves	5 August 2022, 20:00	DW Stadium	Jack Smith	13,261
St Helens	20–12	Castleford Tigers	7 August 2022, 13:00	Totally Wicked Stadium	Chris Kendall	10,144
Leeds Rhinos	34–14	Salford Red Devils	7 August 2022, 15:00	Headingley	Ben Thaler	14,668
Wakefield Trinity	16–20	Catalans Dragons	7 August 2022, 15:00	The Be Well Support Stadium	Tom Grant	3,227

=== Round 23 ===
Home	Score	Away	Match information
Home	Score	Away	Date and time (BST)	Venue	Referee	Attendance
Warrington Wolves	32–18	Toulouse Olympique	11 August 2022, 20:00	Halliwell Jones Stadium	Chris Kendall	9,199
Castleford Tigers	18–8	Catalans Dragons	12 August 2022, 20:00	Mend-A-Hose Jungle	Tom Grant	6,147
Hull KR	20–28	Leeds Rhinos	12 August 2022, 20:00	Sewell Group Craven Park	Jack Smith	8,028
Salford Red Devils	33–16	Huddersfield Giants	13 August 2022, 13:00	AJ Bell Stadium	Liam Moore	4,400
Hull FC	6–60	St Helens	14 August 2022, 15:00	KCOM Stadium	Ben Thaler	10,097
Wakefield Trinity	30–12	Wigan Warriors	14 August 2022, 15:00	The Be Well Support Stadium	Marcus Griffiths	3.933

=== Round 24 ===
Home	Score	Away	Match information
Home	Score	Away	Date and time (BST)	Venue	Referee	Attendance
Huddersfield Giants	36–10	Castleford Tigers	18 August 2022, 20:00	John Smiths Stadium	Jack Smith	4,168
Hull FC	18–26	Wakefield Trinity	19 August 2022, 20:00	MKM Stadium	Liam Moore	9,165
Leeds Rhinos	24–18	Warrington Wolves	19 August 2022, 20:00	Headingley	Marcus Griffiths	13,152
St Helens	38–12	Hull KR	19 August 2022, 20:00	Totally Wicked Stadium	Chris Kendall	10,048
Wigan Warriors	52–6	Toulouse Olympique	19 August 2022, 20:00	DW Stadium	Tom Grant	12,145
Catalans Dragons	14–46	Salford Red Devils	20 August 2022, 18:00	Stade Gilbert Brutus	Ben Thaler	7,133

=== Round 25 ===
Home	Score	Away	Match information
Home	Score	Away	Date and time (BST)	Venue	Referee	Attendance
Leeds Rhinos	18–14	Huddersfield Giants	24 August 2022, 20:00	Headingley	Jack Smith	11,225
Toulouse Olympique	14–24	Catalans Dragons	25 August 2022, 19:30	Stade Ernest Wallon	Liam Moore	9,165
Wakefield Trinity	18–6	Hull KR	25 August 2022, 19:30	The Be Well Support Stadium	Marcus Griffiths	4,653
Salford Red Devils	28–18	Hull FC	25 August 2022, 19:45	AJ Bell Stadium	Tom Grant	3,968
Warrington Wolves	18–19	Castleford Tigers	25 August 2022, 20:00	Halliwell Jones Stadium	Chris Kendall	8,104
Wigan Warriors	30–10	St Helens	26 August 2022, 20:00	DW Stadium	Ben Thaler	19,210

=== Round 26 ===
Home	Score	Away	Match information
Home	Score	Away	Date and time (BST)	Venue	Referee	Attendance
Hull FC	38–12	Toulouse Olympique	28 August 2022, 15:00	MKM Stadium	Aaron Moore	8,785
Huddersfield Giants	38–36	Warrington Wolves	29 August 2022, 15:00	John Smiths Stadium	Marcus Griffiths	4,894
Hull KR	38–28	Wigan Warriors	29 August 2022, 15:00	Sewell Group Craven Park	Chris Kendall	7,315
St Helens	18–34	Wakefield Trinity	29 August 2022, 15:00	Totally Wicked Stadium	Tom Grant	8,222
Castleford Tigers	10–50	Salford Red Devils	29 August 2022, 15:30	The Mend-A-Hose Jungle	Liam Moore	7,322
Catalans Dragons	32–18	Leeds Rhinos	29 August 2022, 19:00	Stade Gilbert Brutus	Robert Hicks	9,802

=== Round 27 ===
Home	Score	Away	Match information
Home	Score	Away	Date and time (BST)	Venue	Referee	Attendance
Huddersfield Giants	16–14 (Note: After golden-point extra time)	Wakefield Trinity	2 September 2022, 19:45	John Smiths Stadium	Chris Kendall	5,524
Wigan Warriors	48–4	Catalans Dragons	2 September 2022, 20:00	DW Stadium	James Child	13,275
Hull FC	4–36	Hull KR	3 September 2022, 15:00	MKM Stadium	Liam Moore	16,999
Leeds Rhinos	14–8	Castleford Tigers	3 September 2022, 15:00	Headingley	Ben Thaler	15,418
Salford Red Devils	14–32	Warrington Wolves	3 September 2022, 15:00	AJ Bell Stadium	Robert Hicks	5,123
St Helens	36–16	Toulouse Olympique	3 September 2022, 15:00	Totally Wicked Stadium	Michael Smaill	13,112

== Play-offs ==
=== Team bracket ===
Eliminators
4	Catalans Dragons	10
5	Leeds Rhinos	20
3	Huddersfield Giants	0
6	Salford Red Devils	28

Semi-finals
2	Wigan Warriors	8
5	Leeds Rhinos	20
1	St Helens	19
6	Salford Red Devils	12

Grand Final
5	Leeds Rhinos	12
1	St Helens	24

=== Week 1: Eliminators ===
First eliminator

9 September 2022
20:00 BST (UTC+01)

Catalans Dragons	10 – 20	Leeds Rhinos
Tries: Whare; Goals: Tomkins (3)	Report	Tries: Sutcliffe (3); Goals: Hardaker (4)

Stade Gilbert Brutus, Perpignan
Attendance: 9,514
Referee: James Child

Second eliminator

10 September 2022
13:00 BST (UTC+01)

Huddersfield Giants	0 – 28	Salford Red Devils
	Report	Tries: Burgess, Watkins, Brierley, Ackers; Goals: Sneyd (6)

John Smiths Stadium, Huddersfield
Attendance: 6,327
Referee: Robert Hicks

=== Week 2: Semi-finals ===
First semi-final

16 September 2022
20:00 BST (UTC+01)

Wigan Warriors	8–20	Leeds Rhinos
Tries: Marshall; Powell		Tries: Bentley (2); O'Connor; Goals: Hardaker (4)

DW Stadium, Wigan
Attendance: 12,777
Referee: Liam Moore

Second semi-final

17 September 2022
13:00 BST (UTC+01)

St Helens	19–12	Salford Red Devils
Tries: Batchelor (2), Bennison; Goals: Makinson (3); Drop goals: Lomax		Tries: Watkins; Brierley; Goals: Sneyd (2)

Totally Wicked Stadium, St Helens
Attendance: 12,357
Referee: Chris Kendall

=== Week 3: Grand Final ===
Grand Final

24 September 2022
18:00 BST (UTC+01)

St Helens	24–12	Leeds Rhinos
Tries: Lees; Bennison; Hurrell; Percival; Goals: Makinson (4)		Tries: Leeming; Martin; Goals: Martin (2)

Old Trafford, Manchester
Attendance: 60,783
Referee: Liam Moore
Player of the Match: Jonny Lomax (St Helens)
