= Elliot Kear =

Wales international rugby league footballer

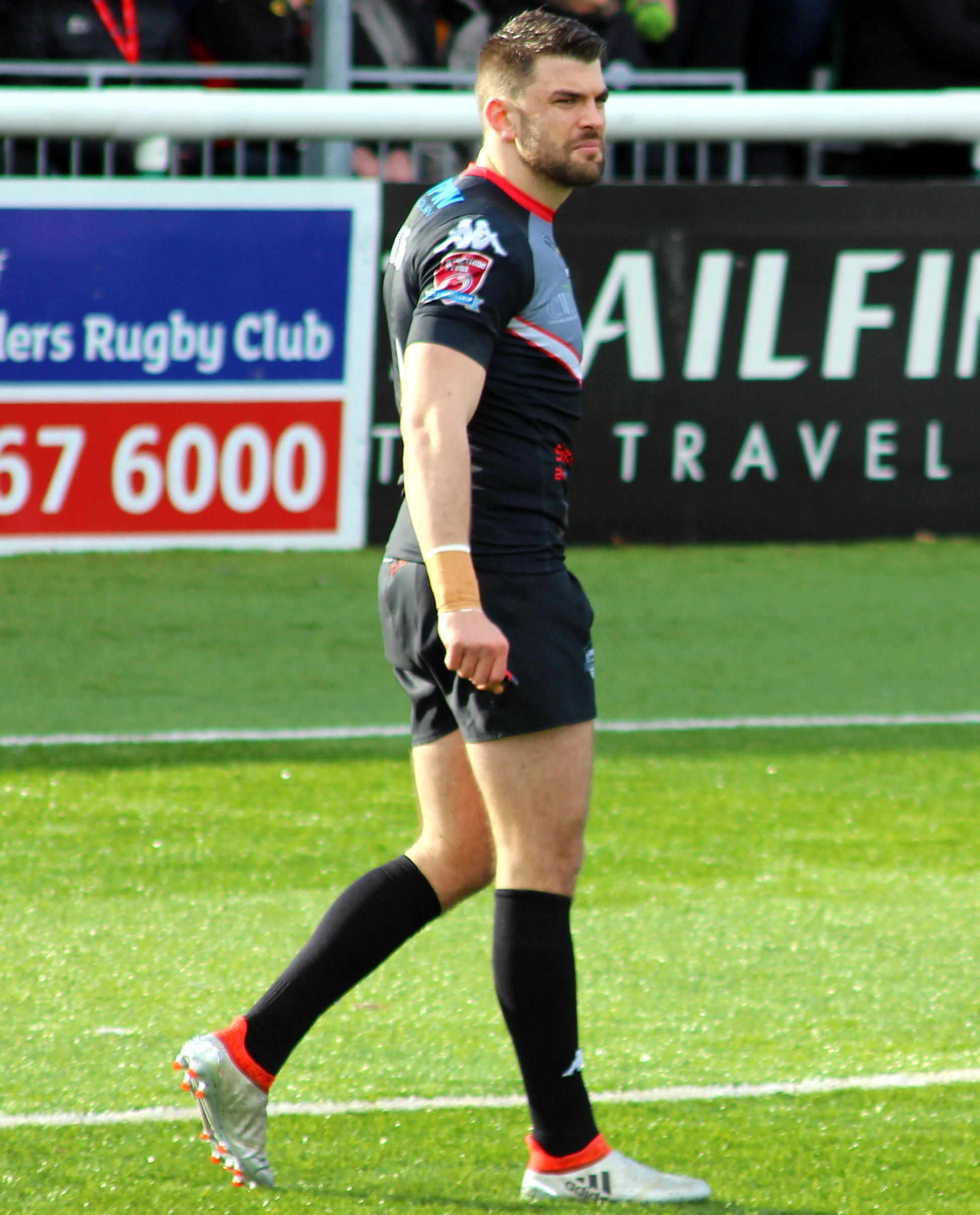

Personal information
- Full name: Elliot Kear
- Born: 29 November 1988 (age 37) Cardiff, Wales
- Height: 5 ft 9 in (1.74 m)
- Weight: 12 st 6 lb (79 kg)

Playing information

Rugby league
- Position: Wing, Centre, Fullback
Club
Years	Team	Pld	T	G	FG	P
2009–11	Crusaders RL	22	5	0	0	20
2010(loan)	→ South Wales Scorpions	13	5	0	0	20
2011(loan)	→ Hunslet Hawks	10	5	15	0	50
2012–14	Bradford Bulls	59	21	0	0	84
2015–19	London Broncos	130	36	1	0	150
2016(loan)	→ London Skolars	1	2	0	0	8
2020–21	Salford Red Devils	13	1	0	0	4
2021–22	Bradford Bulls	27	4	10	0	36
2023–25	Batley Bulldogs	46	10	0	0	40
	Total	321	89	26	0	412
Representative
Years	Team	Pld	T	G	FG	P
2009–	Wales	34	12	1	0	44

Rugby union
- Position: Wing, Fullback
Club
Years	Team	Pld	T	G	FG	P
2014–15	London Welsh	14	1	0	0	0
- Source: As of 12 March 2025

Elliot Kear (born 29 November 1988), is a Welsh professional rugby league footballer who played as a wing, centre or fullback He is now the record 2nd all time Welsh cap holder with 34 caps.

He previously played for Crusaders RL in the Super League, and on loan at the South Wales Scorpions in League 1 and the Hunslet Hawks in the Co-operative Championship. Kear has also played for the London Broncos in the Championship and Super League.

He has played 34 times for Wales in European competitions, 2011 Four Nations, 2013 Rugby League World Cup 2017 Rugby League World Cup2021 Rugby League World Cup. He is their fourth all-time top try scorer. He was made Wales captain on 27 October 2018.

He played rugby union for London Welsh in the Aviva Premiership.

== Early life ==
Kear was born in Cardiff. He attended Whitchurch High School in his hometown Cardiff, and was in the same year as Sam Warburton and Gareth Bale. He excelled in a number of sports while in school. He also represented Cardiff schools at rugby union, and played for the Cardiff Demons amateur rugby league club.

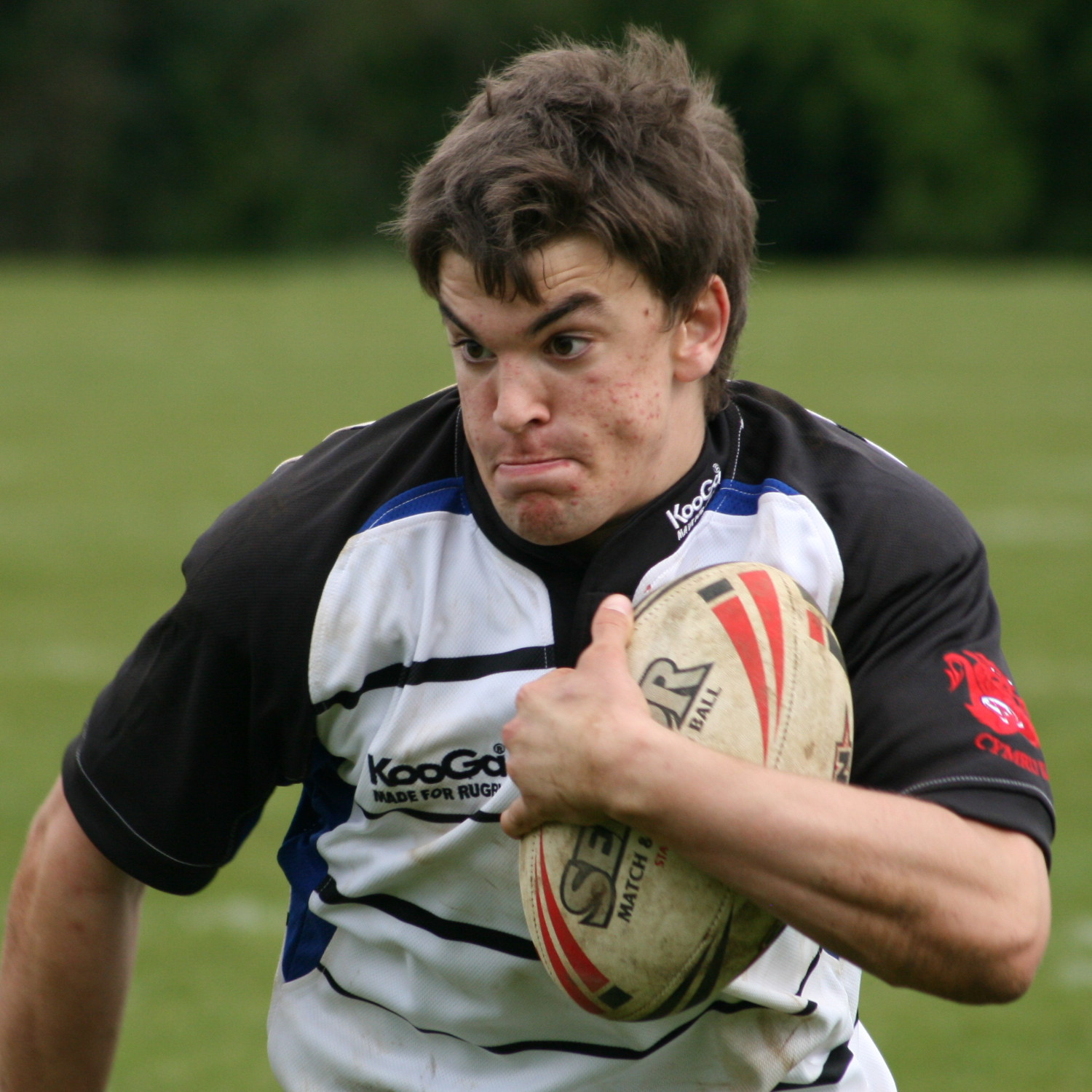
Kear playing for the Celtic Crusaders against the Hemel Stags in 2008

== Rugby league ==
=== Crusaders RL ===
Kear made his Super League début on 22 August 2009 at Rodney Parade in Newport against the Leeds Rhinos. He was named man of the match after making several fine try-saving tackles against the eventual Super League champions. He also played in Celtic Crusaders final two games of the season against Huddersfield Giants and Castleford Tigers. On 7 October 2009, Kear signed his first professional contract at Celtic Crusaders for the 2010 season, hoping to cement his place as the first choice full back at the club, under new head coach Brian Noble.

In May 2010, Kear was recalled to the Crusaders first team playing in the Challenge cup 4th Round loss at Leeds. Playing on the Left wing Kear made the first Crusaders try and scored a second half try in a performance that earn't him praise from the commentators and his coach Iestyn Harris.

The following game Kear played an important part in the crucial win over the Wakefield Trinity Wildcats which also saw him selected in the Frontline index Super League team of Round 14.

=== Bradford Bulls ===
Kear signed for the Bradford side for three years. The Bradford side beat of stiff competition from numerous Super League clubs to secure the highly rated winger's signature. Kear played three seasons with Bradford before signing with the London Broncos.

Season	Appearance	Tries	Goals	F/G	Points
2012 Bradford Bulls	9	2	0	0	8
2013 Bradford Bulls	28	11	0	0	44
2014 Bradford Bulls	22	8	0	0	32
2021 Bradford Bulls	3	0	0	0	0
2022 Bradford Bulls	24	4	10	0	36
Total	86	25	10	0	120

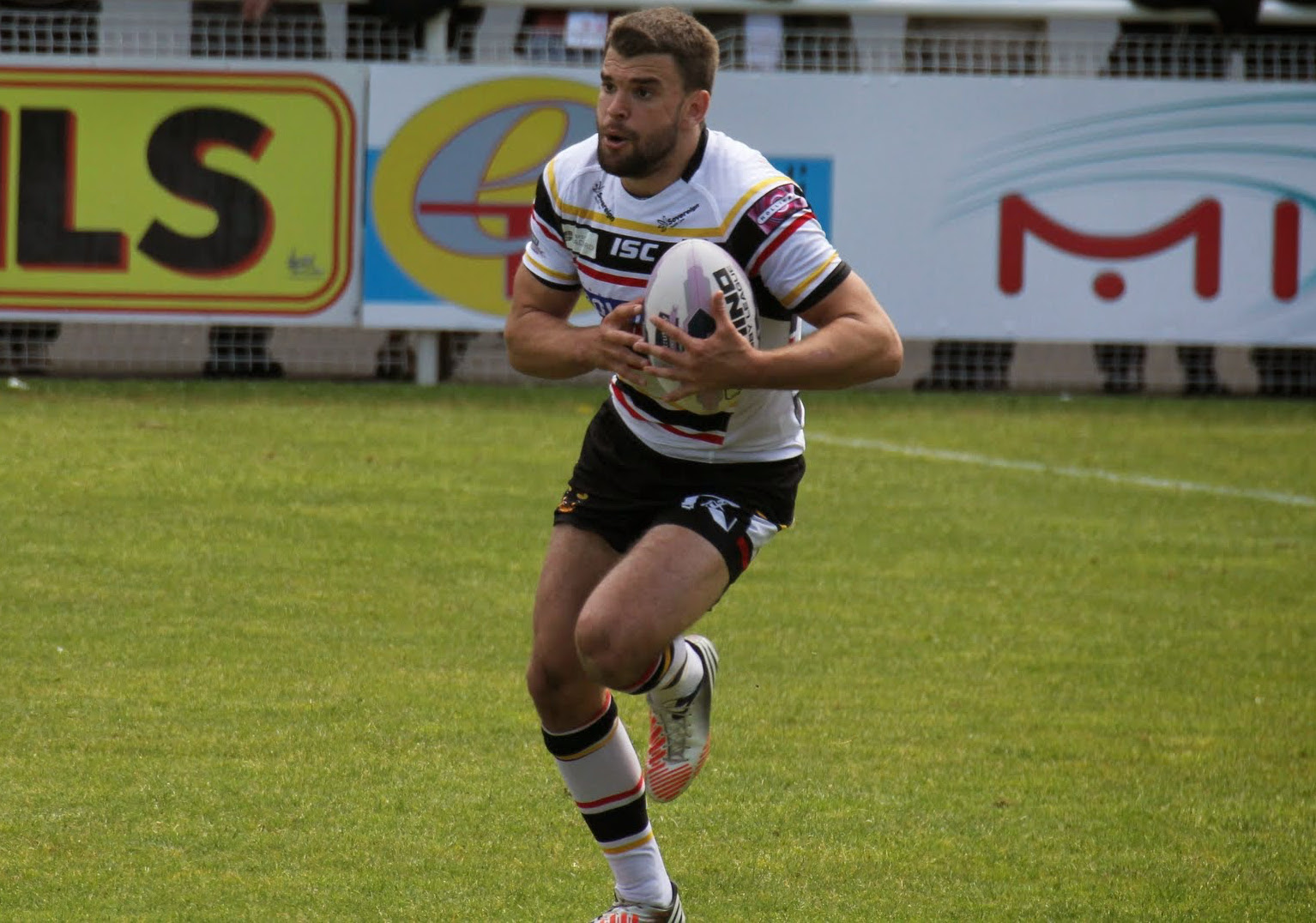
Kear playing for the Bradford Bulls in 2014

=== London Broncos ===
Kear signed for the London Broncos in 2015 and resigned for a further two years in 2016. He was awarded the No 1 shirt as starting Fullback for the 2017 season. On Sunday 12 February 2017 he played his 50th game for the London side at home against Hull KR. Kear played the 200th game of his professional Rugby League career on Saturday 2 September 2017 for the London Broncos against Warrington.

=== Bradford Bulls (re-join) ===
On 15 May 2021, it was reported that he had signed for Bradford in the RFL Championship in order to play part-time and start a new role outside rugby as a firefighter.

== Rugby union ==
=== London Welsh ===
On 21 November 2014, Kear switched codes to rugby union as he signed for London Welsh, who compete in England's top rugby union competition, the Aviva Premiership from the 2014–15 season. Kear made his début on 7 December 2014 against Edinburgh Rugby in the European Challenge Cup at Murrayfield. Kear made his first Aviva Premiership start against Saracens on Saturday 20 December scoring a try on his début at the Allianze Stadium in the away loss.

== International career ==
Internationally, Kear played for Wales at four World Cups, two as Captain in 2013, 2017, 2022, and the Nines world cup in 2019. Kear was appointed as the new Captain of Wales for the World Cup qualifiers and European Championship on Wednesday 12 September 2018. He won his first full International cap when he started as full back against England on 17 October 2009. He scored his first try for Wales on 25 October 2009, in their 88-8 victory over Serbia in the European Cup. A week later he scored his second try in Welsh colours, during their 42-12 win over Ireland in the European Cup. In the final against Scotland he scored another try for the Welsh and was voted man of the match in their 28-16 victory.

In 2010 he represented Wales in the Alitalia European Cup, scoring a hat-trick against Scotland. Playing in his second European Cup final Wales went on to beat France 12 -10 in Albi, the French paper La Depeche vote him as man of the match.

He scored tries against England and Australia in the 2011 Four Nations, and was named in the Wales squad for the 2013 Rugby League World Cup.

Kear scored a try in the 32-16 loss against Italy. Kear played against the USA and Cook Islands where he was named Man of the Match and selected at Fullback in the Rugby League World Cup Team of round 3.

Kear was selected in the Dragons team for the 2014 European Cup However he was unable to join the squad as he had recently changed codes to join London Welsh. He was selected for the 2015 European Cup tournament and played in all 3 games at Fullback, scoring a try in a Man of the Match display in the Final game against Ireland to ensure Wales secured their second European Championship.

Kear was selected in Wales' 22-man squad for the 2017 World Cup qualifiers.

He was selected in the Wales 9s squad for the 2019 Rugby League World Cup 9s.
