= Muizz Mustapha =

Nigerian rugby league footballer (born 2000)

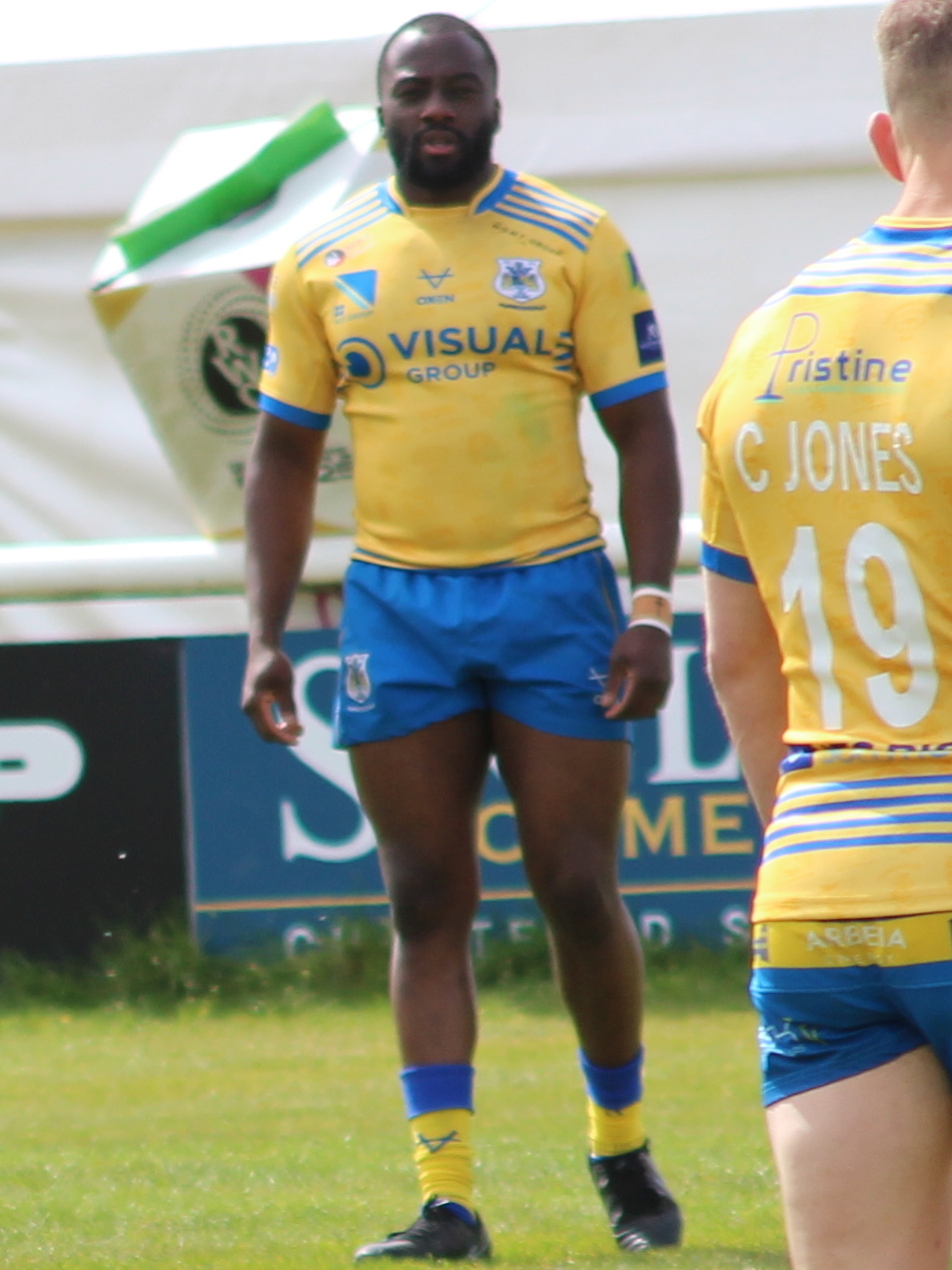

Personal information
- Full name: Muizz Mustapha
- Born: 3 April 2000 (age 26) Nigeria
- Height: 5 ft 9 in (1.75 m)
- Weight: 15 st 4 lb (97 kg)

Playing information
- Position: Prop
Club
Years	Team	Pld	T	G	FG	P
2018–22	Leeds Rhinos	9	1	0	0	4
2018(loan)	→ Featherstone Rovers	1	0	0	0	0
2019(loan)	→ Dewsbury Rams	2	0	0	0	0
2019(loan)	→ Newcastle Thunder	7	3	0	0	12
2021(loan)	→ Hull Kingston Rovers	11	0	0	0	0
2022(loan)	→ Bradford Bulls	8	0	0	0	0
2023–25	Castleford Tigers	47	3	0	0	12
2024(DR)	→ Batley Bulldogs	2	0	0	0	0
2026–	Doncaster R.L.F.C.	10	3	0	0	12
	Total	97	10	0	0	40
Representative
Years	Team	Pld	T	G	FG	P
2025	Nigeria	1	1	0	0	4
- Source: As of 19 September 2025

Muizz Mustapha (born 3 April 2000) is a Nigerian professional rugby league footballer who plays as a prop forward for Doncaster R.L.F.C. in the RFL Championship.

He has previously played for Leeds Rhinos and Castleford Tigers in the Super League. He has spent time on loan and dual registration at Hull Kingston Rovers in the Super League, at Featherstone Rovers, Dewsbury Rams, Bradford Bulls and Batley Bulldogs in the RFL Championship, and at Newcastle Thunder in League 1.

== Background ==
Mustapha was born in Nigeria. He moved to Leeds with his family as a young child, initially settling in Harehills then later Hunslet.

Mustapha played junior rugby league for Hunslet Warriors. He joined the Leeds Rhinos youth system at scholarship level.

== Career ==
=== Leeds Rhinos ===
In 2018, he made a professional debut while on loan at Featherstone Rovers and has also spent time at the Dewsbury Rams in the Championship.

In 2019, he made his debut for Leeds against Workington Town in the Challenge Cup.

On 18 November 2020, it was announced that Mustapha would join Hull Kingston Rovers on a season-long loan starting in 2021.

==== Hull Kingston Rovers (loan) ====
Mustapha made a total of eleven appearances for Hull KR in the 2021 season including the club's 28–10 semi-final defeat against Catalans Dragons.

==== Bradford Bulls (loan) ====
On 2 December 2021, it was announced that he had signed for Bradford in the RFL Championship on loan.

=== Castleford Tigers ===
On 3 October 2022, the Castleford Tigers announced the signing of Mustapha from Leeds. He would join on a one-year deal, with an option for a further year in the club's favour. Head coach Lee Radford said, "His leg speed, his defence, his line speed is fantastic, and he is a different shape to a lot of front rowers kicking around in the competition."

Mustapha made his Castleford debut on 26 February 2023 against St Helens. He played thirteen matches for Castleford in the 2023 season as the club finished 11th on the table narrowly avoiding relegation.

In the 2025 season, he made seventeen appearances for Castleford, scoring three tries. On 10 October, Castleford announced Mustapha would depart the club to pursue playing opportunities elsewhere.

==== Batley Bulldogs (DR) ====
In June 2024, Mustapha made two appearances for Batley Bulldogs in the RFL Championship, through their dual registration agreement with Castleford.

=== Doncaster R.L.F.C. ===
On 26 October 2025, Mustapha signed for Doncaster R.L.F.C. in the RFL Championship on a two-year deal.

== International ==
On 11 September 2019, Mustapha was called up for the Nigeria 60-man training squad.

He played for Nigeria when they faced off against a combined Cumbria side in Barrow in November 2025, he started at loose forward and scored Nigeria's only try in the 70-6 loss.

== Club statistics ==
Appearances and points in all competitions by year
Club	Season	Tier	App	T	G	DG	Pts
Leeds Rhinos	2019	Super League	1	0	0	0	0
Leeds Rhinos	2020	Super League	2	0	0	0	0
Leeds Rhinos	2022	Super League	6	1	0	0	4
Leeds Rhinos	Total		9	1	0	0	4
→ Featherstone Rovers (loan)	2018	Championship	1	0	0	0	0
→ Dewsbury Rams (loan)	2019	Championship	2	0	0	0	0
→ Newcastle Thunder (loan)	2019	League 1	7	3	0	0	12
→ Hull Kingston Rovers (loan)	2021	Super League	11	0	0	0	0
→ Bradford Bulls (loan)	2022	Championship	8	0	0	0	0
Castleford Tigers	2023	Super League	16	0	0	0	0
Castleford Tigers	2024	Super League	14	0	0	0	0
Castleford Tigers	2025	Super League	17	3	0	0	12
Castleford Tigers	Total		47	3	0	0	12
→ Batley Bulldogs (DR)	2024	Championship	2	0	0	0	0
Doncaster R.L.F.C.	2026	Championship	0	0	0	0	0
Career total			87	7	0	0	28

As of match played 19 September 2025
