= Liam Tindall =

English rugby league footballer (born 2001)

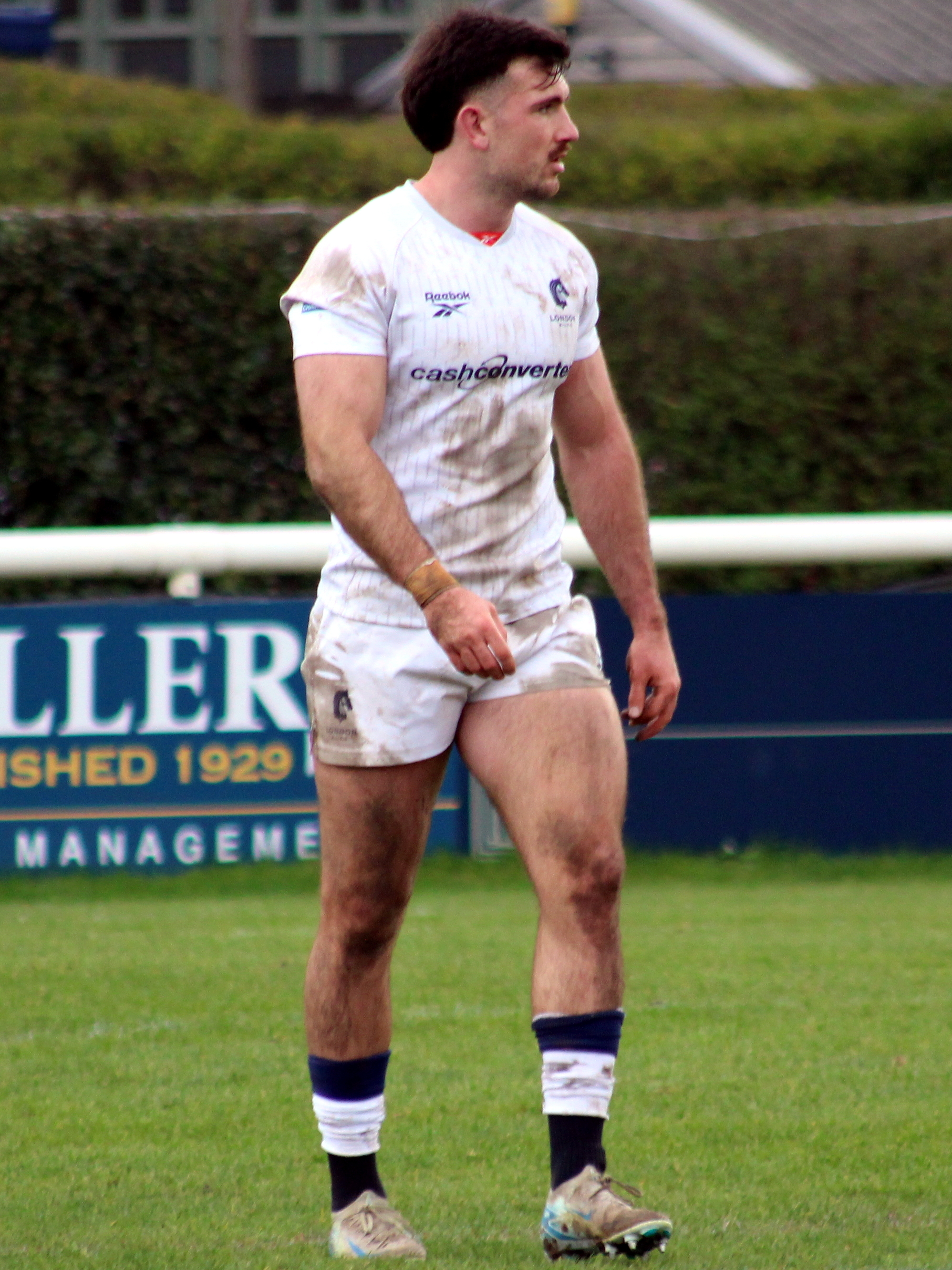

Personal information
- Full name: Liam Tindall
- Born: 27 September 2001 (age 25) Leeds, West Yorkshire, England
- Height: 6 ft 0 in (1.83 m)
- Weight: 14 st 5 lb (91 kg)

Playing information
- Position: Wing
Club
Years	Team	Pld	T	G	FG	P
2020–23	Leeds Rhinos	23	2	0	0	8
2021(loan)	→ Doncaster	8	3	0	0	12
2022(loan)	→ Bradford Bulls	2	2	0	0	8
2023(DR)	→ Bradford Bulls	7	4	0	0	16
2024	Hull FC	3	0	0	0	0
2024(loan)	→ Bradford Bulls	4	0	0	0	0
2025–	London Broncos	39	36	0	0	144
	Total	86	47	0	0	188
Representative
Years	Team	Pld	T	G	FG	P
2022	England Knights	1	0	0	0	0
- Source: As of 19 November 2026

Liam Tindall (born 27 September 2001) is an English professional rugby league footballer who plays as a winger for the London Broncos in the Super League. He has played for the England Knights at international level.

He has previously played for the Leeds Rhinos and Hull FC in the Super League. Tindall has spent time on loan from Leeds at Doncaster and the Bradford Bulls. He also spent time on loan at Bradford from Hull.

== Career ==
=== Leeds Rhinos ===
Tindall made his Super League debut in round 14 of the 2020 Super League season for Leeds against the Catalans Dragons.

Tindall scored his first Super League try in round 17 vs St Helens.

=== Hull FC ===
On 2 Oct 2023 it was reported he had signed for Hull FC on a 2-year deal.

=== Bradford Bull (loan) ===
On 9 May 2024 it was reported he had signed for the Bradford Bulls on a one-month loan.

=== London Broncos ===
On 20 February 2025 it was reported that he had signed for the London Broncos in the RFL Championship.

In August 2026, he was part of the Broncos squad that lifted the RFL Championship Leaders' Shield.

In 2026 he was part of the London Broncos squad that secured their historic treble of League Leaders' Shield, 1895 Cup and Grand Final victories.

== Club statistics ==
Year	Club	League Competition	Appearances	Tries	Goals	Drop goals	Points	Notes
2020	Leeds Rhinos	2020 Super League	3	1	0	0	4	
2021	Leeds Rhinos	2021 Super League	1	0	0	0	0	
2021	→ Doncaster	2021 RFL Championship	8	3	0	0	12	loan
2022	Leeds Rhinos	2022 Super League	13	0	0	0	0	
2022	→ Bradford Bulls	2022 RFL Championship	2	2	0	0	8	loan
2023	Leeds Rhinos	2023 Super League	6	1	0	0	4	
2023	→ Bradford Bulls	2023 RFL Championship	7	4	0	0	16	loan
2024	Hull FC	2024 Super League	3	0	0	0	0	
2024	→ Bradford Bulls	2024 RFL Championship	4	0	0	0	0	loan
2025	London Broncos	2025 RFL Championship	23	17	0	0	68	
2026	London Broncos	2026 RFL Championship	16	19	0	0	76	
2027	London Broncos	2027 Super League						
			86	47	0	0	188	
