= Ryan Millar (rugby league) =

English rugby league footballer

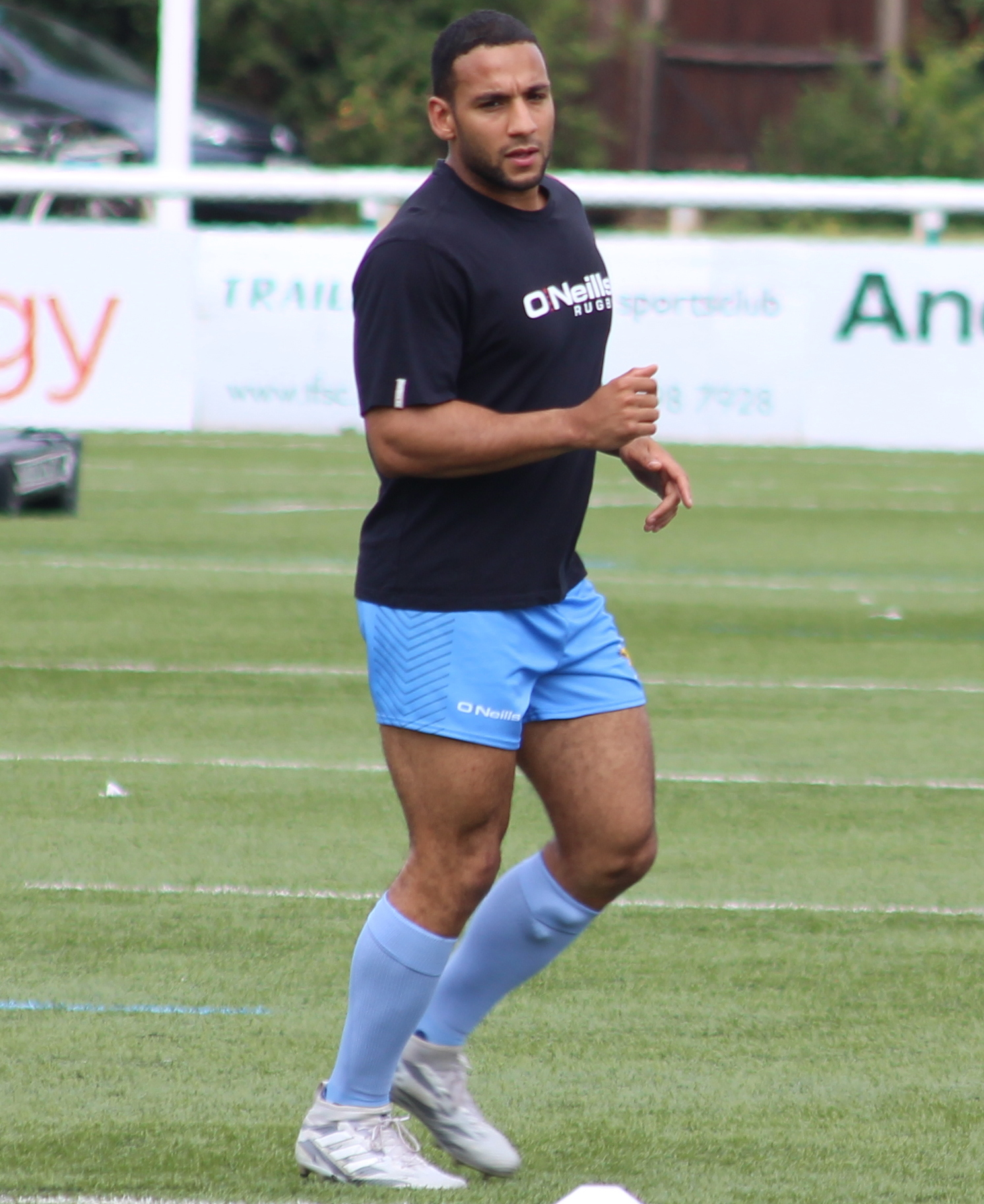

Personal information
- Full name: Ryan Michael Lewis Millar
- Born: 12 May 1994 (age 32) Bielefeld, Germany
- Height: 5 ft 10 in (1.78 m)
- Weight: 14 st 2 lb (90 kg)

Playing information
- Position: Wing, Fullback
Club
Years	Team	Pld	T	G	FG	P
2015–21	Sheffield Eagles	111	54	0	0	216
2022	Bradford Bulls	21	8	0	0	32
2023	Widnes Vikings	8	8	0	0	32
2024–26	Sheffield Eagles	43	17	0	0	68
2027–	Rochdale Hornets	0	0	0	0	0
	Total	183	87	0	0	348
- Source: As of 10 November 2026

Ryan Michael Lewis Millar (born 12 May 1994) is a British professional rugby league footballer who plays on the wing for the Rochdale Hornets in the Betfred Championship.

== Background ==
Millar was born in Biederfeld, Germany but brought up in Birmingham, England. He is of Barbadian descent. He trained as an Architect in Sheffield.

== Playing career ==
=== Sheffield Eagles ===
Millar is a graduate of the Sheffield Eagles Academy system He made his professional debut for the Eagles on 26 June 2015 in a 14 points to 22 away triumph at London Broncos, he scored two consecutive tries in 5 minutes to put his team 10–6 in front just after the half-time break. Millar made his home debut against Hull Kingston Rovers in The Qualifiers at Bramall Lane. This time he scored a hat-trick in a 28–38 loss. Millar has forced his way into a regular first team spot ahead of the 2016 season, as one of the newest young talents to come out the Eagles' youth set-up. During that season he made eight starts and scored a total of 5 tries. The wing was now considered a permanent fixture in the Eagles line-up and throughout the course of the 2017 campaign he showed his versatility in playing as a fullback as well as his natural position on the wing. Millar played a total of 22 games (21 starts) during 2017, but his scoring run dried up as he only managed the one try against Oldham on the first day of the season. In 2019 he helped the Eagles to win the inaugural 1895 Cup as they defeated Widnes Vikings 36–18 in the final. In 2021 it was announced Millar was set to leave the club at the end of the season.

=== Bradford Bulls ===
Millar joined Bradford Bulls ahead of the 2022 season on a two-year deal.

=== Widnes Vikings ===
On 12 December 2022 it was announced that Millar had signed for Widnes Vikings on a one-year deal.

=== Sheffield Eagles (re-join) ===
On 16 November 2023 it was reported that he had signed for Sheffield Eagles in the RFL Championship on a 2-year deal.

=== Rochdale Hornets ===
On 30 October 2026 it was reported that he had signed for Rochdale Hornets in the RFL Championship on a 1-year deal.
