= Ajahni Wallace =

Jamaica international rugby league footballer

Personal information
- Full name: Ajahni Edward Sylvester Wallace
- Born: 31 March 2003 (age 23) Huddersfield, West Yorkshire, England
- Height: 5 ft 11 in (1.80 m)
- Weight: 14 st 13 lb (95 kg)

Playing information
- Position: Second-row
Club
Years	Team	Pld	T	G	FG	P
2022–23	Bradford Bulls	42	11	0	0	44
2024–25	Hull KR	0	0	0	0	0
2024 (loan)	→ Featherstone Rovers	2	0	0	0	0
2024 (loan)	→ Whitehaven RLFC	2	1	0	0	4
2024 (loan)	→ Doncaster RLFC	8	0	0	0	0
2025 (loan)	→ Goole Vikings	1	0	0	0	0
2025 (loan)	→ Sheffield Eagles	3	2	0	0	8
2025(loan)	→ Toulouse Olympique	10	1	0	0	4
2026	Toulouse Olympique	16	0	0	0	0
2027–	Halifax Panthers	0	0	0	0	0
	Total	84	15	0	0	60
Representative
Years	Team	Pld	T	G	FG	P
2022–	Jamaica	4	0	0	0	0
- Source: As of 13 October 2026

Ajahni "AJ" Wallace (born 31 March 2003) is a Jamaica international rugby league footballer who plays as a second-row forward for Halifax Panthers in the RFL Championship.

== Background ==
Wallace was born in Huddersfield, West Yorkshire, England. He is of Jamaican descent.

He played his junior rugby league for the St Joseph Sharks, before moving on to Siddal.

== Playing career ==
=== Club career ===
Wallace came through the youth system at the Leeds Rhinos before leaving at the end of the 2021 season.

=== Bradford Bulls ===
He joined the Bradford Bulls ahead of the 2022 RFL Championship season.

=== Hull KR ===
On 13 May 2023 it was reported that he would join Hull KR for the 2024 season on a 2-year deal.

=== Featherstone Rovers (loan) ===
In April 2024 he played twice for Featherstone Rovers in the RFL Championship on 2-week short-term loan, making his debut on 7 April 2024.

=== Whitehaven RLFC (loan) ===
On 4 July 2024 he appeared for Whitehaven RLFC in the Championship on 2-week short-term loan

=== Doncaster RLFC (loan) ===
On 17 July 2024 he was loaned to Doncaster RLFC in the Championship for the remainder of the 2024 season

=== Sheffield Eagles (loan) ===
On 1 April 2025 he was loaned to Sheffield Eagles in the Championship for one-month.

=== Toulouse Olympique ===
On 11 June 2025 he was loaned to Toulouse Olympique in the Championship for the remainder of the 2025 season

On 20 October 2025 he returned to Toulouse Olympique on a permanent deal

=== Halifax Panthers ===
On 23 September 2026 it was reported that he had signed for Halifax Panthers in the RFL Championship

=== International career ===
Wallace is an England youth international, having played against France in 2019.

In 2022 he was named in the Jamaica squad for the 2021 Rugby League World Cup. He made his debut in the second-row in the Group C match against Ireland at Headingley Rugby Stadium in Leeds, West Yorkshire.
