= Sam Scott (rugby league) =

English rugby league player (born 1990)

Personal information
- Full name: Samuel John William Scott
- Born: 5 June 1990 (age 36)
- Height: 6 ft 2 in (1.88 m)
- Weight: 16 st 6 lb (104 kg)

Playing information
- Position: Second-row
Club
Years	Team	Pld	T	G	FG	P
2011–13	Sheffield Eagles	38	12	0	0	48
2013	York City Knights	22	8	0	0	32
2014–16	Batley Bulldogs	52	18	0	0	72
2017	Sheffield Eagles	32	8	0	0	24
2018–21	York City Knights	68	23	0	0	92
2022	Bradford Bulls	8	3	0	0	12
	Total	220	72	0	0	280
- Source: As of 13 January 2023

Samuel John William Scott (born 5 June 1990) is a former professional rugby league footballer who last played as a second-row for the Bradford Bulls in the Championship.

Scott has previously played for the Batley Bulldogs, Sheffield Eagles and York City Knights, in England, and has played cricket for Shelley in the Drakes league.
