= Chester Butler (rugby league) =

Wales international rugby league footballer

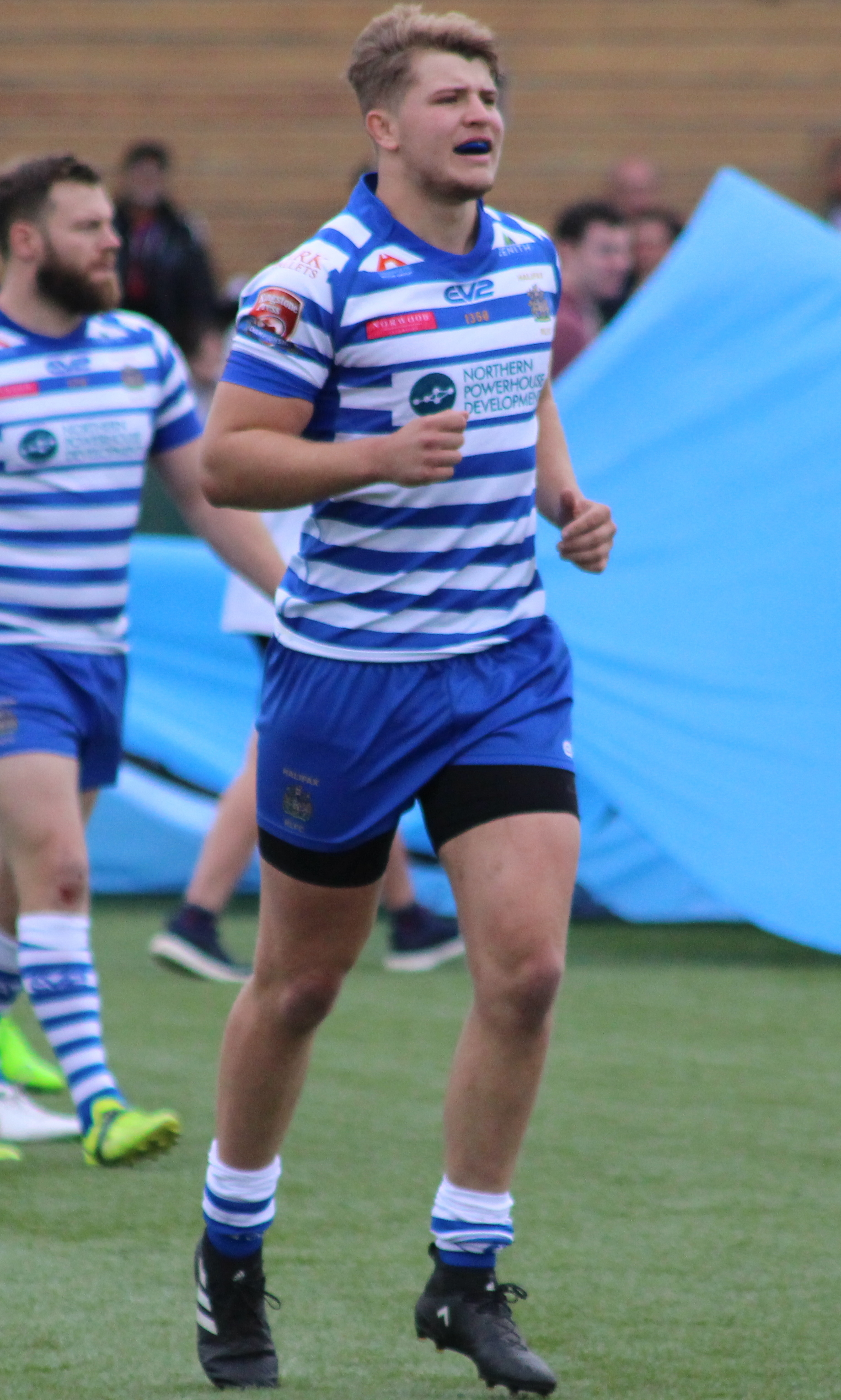

Personal information
- Full name: Chester Butler
- Born: 3 October 1995 (age 30) Nottingham, Nottinghamshire, England (Note: Butler's birthplace is listed as Halifax, West Yorkshire, England by Total Rugby League and Wales Rugby League. Rugby League Project lists Nottingham as his birthplace.)
- Height: 6 ft 2 in (1.89 m)
- Weight: 15 st 6 lb (98 kg)

Playing information
- Position: Second-row, Centre
Club
Years	Team	Pld	T	G	FG	P
2016–19	Halifax	48	23	0	0	92
2017(loan)	→ South Wales Ironmen	2	0	0	0	0
2019–22	Huddersfield Giants	1	0	0	0	0
2022(loan)	→ Bradford Bulls	19	6	0	0	24
2023–24	Bradford Bulls	34	10	0	0	40
	Total	104	39	0	0	156
Representative
Years	Team	Pld	T	G	FG	P
2017–22	Wales	8	2	0	0	8
- Source: As of 12 April 2026
- Father: Peter Butler
- Relatives: Colin Dixon (maternal grandfather)

Chester Butler also known as Chezzy (born 3 October 1995) is a Wales international rugby league footballer who last played as a second-row forward or centre for the Bradford Bulls in the Championship.

He previously played for on loan from the Huddersfield Giants in the Super League, Halifax in the Championship, and spent time on loan from 'Fax at the South Wales Ironmen in League 1.

== Background ==
Butler was born in Nottingham, Nottinghamshire, England.

Butler's father Peter Butler was a professional footballer, and his maternal grandfather, Colin Dixon, was a Wales international rugby league footballer.

== Career ==
Chester came through the system at his hometown club Halifax, graduating through the reserve system at The Shay to become a regular first teamer.

Butler was named in the Wales squad for the 2017 Rugby League World Cup.

On 20 May 2019, Butler signed for Huddersfield. On 11 February 2022, it was announced Butler had signed for Championship club Bradford on a season long loan. On 19 August 2022, it was announced Butler had signed a permanent two-year deal with Bradford club.
