= Corey Johnson (rugby league) =

English rugby league footballer

Personal information
- Full name: Corey George Johnson
- Born: 16 November 2000 (age 25) England

Playing information
- Position: Hooker
Club
Years	Team	Pld	T	G	FG	P
2019–24	Leeds Rhinos	29	1	0	0	4
2019(loan)	→ Featherstone Rovers	2	0	0	0	0
2021(loan)	→ York City Knights	7	0	1	0	2
2022(loan)	→ Bradford Bulls	3	1	0	0	4
2023(loan)	→ Bradford Bulls	1	0	0	0	0
2024(loan)	→ Bradford Bulls	1	0	0	0	0
2024(DR)	→ Halifax Panthers	13	0	0	0	0
2025–	Sheffield Eagles	22	4	0	0	16
	Total	78	6	1	0	26
- Source: As of 3 November 2024

Corey Johnson (born 16 November 2000) is an English professional rugby league footballer who plays as a hooker for Sheffield Eagles in the RFL Championship.

== Playing career ==
=== Leeds Rhinos ===
In 2019, he made his professional debut on loan at Featherstone Rovers in the Championship and made his Super League début in Leeds' final home game of the 2019 season. Despite being less than two years into a four-year contract to stay at Leeds until 2022, Johnson was released from his contract in March 2020 announcing his retirement from the game to focus on life away from rugby league.

=== York RLFC (loan) ===
On 8 July 2021, it was reported that he had come out of retirement, re-signed for Leeds and then signed for York RLFC in the RFL Championship on loan.

=== Bradford Bulls (loan) ===
On 2 December 2021, it was reported that he had signed for Bradford in the RFL Championship on loan.

=== Bradford Bulls (loan) ===
On 29 February 2024 it was reported that he had signed for Bradford Bulls in the RFL Championship on loan.

=== Halifax Panthers (DR) ===
On 8 May 2024 it was reported that he had signed for Halifax Panthers in the RFL Championship on DR loan

=== Sheffield Eagles ===
On 3 November 2024, it was reported that he had signed for Sheffield in the RFL Championship on a two-year deal.
