= Jarrod O'Connor =

English professional rugby league footballer

Personal information
- Full name: Jarrod O'Connor
- Born: 20 July 2001 (age 25) Widnes, Cheshire, England
- Height: 5 ft 10 in (1.79 m)
- Weight: 13 st 12 lb (88 kg)

Playing information
- Position: Loose forward, Hooker
Club
Years	Team	Pld	T	G	FG	P
2020–	Leeds Rhinos	153	9	2	0	40
2020(loan)	→ Featherstone Rovers	2	0	0	0	0
2022(loan)	→ Bradford Bulls	2	0	0	0	0
	Total	157	9	2	0	40
- Source: As of 02 October 2026
- Father: Terry O'Connor

Jarrod O'Connor (born 20 July 2001) is a professional rugby league footballer who plays as a hooker and loose forward for the Leeds Rhinos in the Super League.

He has spent time on loan from Leeds at the Bradford Bulls and Featherstone Rovers in the Championship.

== Background ==
O'Connor played his amateur rugby league with the Halton Farnworth Hornets. Jarrod is the son of former Salford, Widnes, Wigan, and Great Britain prop, Terry O'Connor, who now works for Sky Sports.

== Career ==
=== Leeds Rhinos ===
O'Connor made his Super League debut in round 14 of the 2020 Super League season for Leeds against the Catalans Dragons, he converted a Rhys Evans try in the 29th minute. On 24 September 2022, O'Connor played for Leeds in their 24–12 loss to St Helens RFC in the 2022 Super League Grand Final. O'Connor played 27 games for Leeds in the 2023 Super League season as the club finished 8th on the table and missed the playoffs. O'Connor played 27 games for Leeds in the 2023 Super League season as the club finished 8th on the table and missed the playoffs.

=== Bradford Bulls (loan) ===
On 2 December 2021, it was reported that he had signed for Bradford in the RFL Championship on loan.
