= 2022 York City Knights season =

Rugby league team season

York City Knights 2022 season
- 2022 RFL Championship Rank: 6th
- Play-off result: lost in Semi-final
- Challenge Cup: 5th round

Team information
- Chairman: Clint Goodchild
- Head Coach: James Ford
- Stadium: York Community Stadium
Principal colours	Alternate colours
← 2021	List of seasons	2023 →

In the 2022 rugby league season, York City Knights competed in the 2022 RFL Championship and the 2022 Challenge Cup. At the start of the season the club was taken over by Clint Goodchild who became the new chairman. York had a strong first half of the season which included a run of seven wins in the league that helped them finish in sixth place to qualify for the play-offs despite winning only five of their final 11 games. They lost in the semi-finals to Leigh Centurions who earlier in the season inflicted a club record 100–4 defeat on York. In the Challenge Cup York reached the fifth round. It was the final season that the team played as York City Knights after which the club was renamed York RLFC and the team became the Knights.

== Season review ==
=== Pre-season ===
In November 2021, James Ford signed a new contract extending his contract as head coach until the end of the 2024 season. Brett Delaney was appointed as assistant coach, but left in July to join Hull KR. Several players retired at the end of the 2021 season including Tim Spears, who had been at York since the 2017 season, and the pre-season saw numerous player transfers followed by the departure of Jon Flatman as chairman when the club came under the new ownership of Clint Goodchild in January 2022.

=== 2022 Season ===
York began the season on 31 January with a Monday night fixture against Featherstone Rovers in which York lost 30–12. In February, York won against Dewsbury Rams and Batley Bulldogs before losing to Leigh Centurions, Jack Logan, who had signed at the start of the season, announced his retirement from the game, and York defeated Newcastle Thunder 42–13 in the fourth round of the Challenge Cup. At the start of March, York moved to fifth in the league with a 26–24 win over London Broncos, but were knocked out of the Challenge Cup by Whitehaven a week later. However, the women's team continued their Challenge Cup campaign with a double-header played with York's next league game; a 32–6 win over Widnes Vikings in which Levi Edwards made his debut for York and scored his first try for the club. His second came on 3 April as York won 44–18 away to Workington Town in what was also the final game for Kristian Brining who announced his retirement a few weeks later.

York recorded home wins over Newcastle and Whitehaven in April, and started May by defeating Barrow Raiders and winning 20–6 at Bradford Bulls. The run of seven successive league wins, which had taken York up to third in the table, was ended the following week with a 40–24 loss to Halifax Panthers. New signing Bailey Antrobus made his debut in the game and scored his first try for York the following week in a 34–14 win at Sheffield Eagles. York continued to be successful throughout June with a closely fought 36–34 victory over London, followed by away wins at Widnes and Whitehaven. The Whitehaven game was the first ever victory for the City Knights at the Recreation Ground and the first by a York team since 1992. This run of four wins was followed by matches against Barrow, Halifax, Batley and Featherstone, all of whom finished above York in the league table. At the end of July, York defeated Newcastle at the Championship Summer Bash to end a run of four losses, but three weeks later suffered a club record 100–4 loss at Leigh. A run of three wins at the end of the season, including a 74–12 victory over Workington meant that York finished their Championship campaign in sixth place.

In the play-offs, York won 26–24 at Halifax to reach the semi-finals, where their season was ended by a 70–10 loss to Leigh. At the Championship Awards York's AJ Towse was a nominee for the Young Player of the Year.

=== Post-season ===
In October 2022, James Ford resigned from his role as head coach to become assistant coach at Wakefield Trinity. On 14 October it was announced that the club had been renamed York RLFC and that the men's team would be rebranded as the Knights.

== Results ==
=== Pre-season friendlies ===
W Win L Loss

Pre-season results
Date	Versus	H/A	Venue	Result	Score	Tries	Goals	Attendance	Report
7 January	Midlands Hurricanes	H	York Community Stadium	W	46–6	Harris (2), Harrison, Butterworth (2), Kirmond, Brining, Matongo	Ellis (7)		
16 January	Castleford Tigers	H	York Community Stadium	L	10–32	Oakes, Marsh	Ellis		

=== Championship ===
==== League table ====
Pos	Team	Pld	W	D	L	PF	PA	PD	Pts	Qualification
1	Leigh Centurions	27	26	0	1	1306	208	+1098	52	Championship Leaders' Shield & advance to play-off semi-final
2	Featherstone Rovers	27	23	1	3	1060	468	+592	47	Advance to play-off semi-final
3	Halifax Panthers	27	20	0	7	837	442	+395	40	Advance to play-off eliminators
4	Barrow Raiders	27	18	1	8	757	587	+170	37	Advance to play-off eliminators
5	Batley Bulldogs	27	17	2	8	738	551	+187	36	Advance to play-off eliminators
6	York City Knights	27	18	0	9	677	596	+81	36	Advance to play-off eliminators
7	Sheffield Eagles	27	12	0	15	701	660	+41	24	
8	Widnes Vikings	27	12	0	15	567	679	−112	24	
9	Bradford Bulls	27	11	0	16	523	677	−154	22	
10	Whitehaven	27	9	1	17	488	854	−366	19	
11	London Broncos	27	8	1	18	548	740	−192	17	
12	Newcastle Thunder	27	7	1	19	559	877	−318	15	
13	Dewsbury Rams	27	3	1	23	385	964	−579	7	Relegated to League 1
14	Workington Town	27	1	0	26	296	1139	−843	2	Relegated to League 1

==== Championship results ====
W Win D Draw L Loss

Championship results
Date	Round	Versus	H/A	Venue	Result	Score	Tries	Goals	Attendance	Report
31 January	1	Featherstone Rovers	H	York Community Stadium	L	12–30	Glover, Jubb	Ellis (2)	3,602	
6 February	2	Dewsbury Rams	H	York Community Stadium	W	30–2	Marsh, Ellis, Davis, O'Hagan, Clarkson	Ellis (5)	1,562	
13 February	3	Batley Bulldogs	A	Mount Pleasant	W	10–4	Michael, Oakes	Ellis		
20 February	4	Leigh Centurions	H	York Community Stadium	L	4–40	Jubb		2,069	
6 March	5	London Broncos	A	Plough Lane	W	26–24	Oakes, Michael, Harris, Clarkson, Glover	Ellis (3)	903	
20 March	6	Widnes Vikings	H	York Community Stadium	W	32–6	Marsh (2), O'Hagan, Ward, Stock, Edwards	Ellis (2), Harris (2)	2,156	
3 April	7	Workington Town	A	Derwent Park	W	44–18	Harris (2), Thompson, Brown, Edwards, Glover (2), Jubb	Harris (6)		
16 April	8	Newcastle Thunder	H	York Community Stadium	W	38–6	Thompson, Dixon, Glover, Towse (2), Matongo, Brown	Harris (5)		
24 April	9	Whitehaven	H	York Community Stadium	W	30–12	O'Hagan, Edwards, Harris (2), Glover	Harris (5)		
2 May	10	Barrow Raiders	A	Craven Park	W	30–18	Brown, Oakes, Marsh, Thompson, Harris	Harris (4)	2,260	
15 May	11	Bradford Bulls	A	Odsal Stadium	W	20–6	Clarkson, Jubb, O'Hagan, Kirmond	Ellis (2)	3,081	
22 May	12	Halifax Panthers	H	York Community Stadium	L	24–40	Harris (2), Teanby, Marsh	Ellis (4)		
2 June	13	Sheffield Eagles	A	Olympic Legacy Park	W	34–14	Glover, Antrobus, Dixon, Pauli, Stock (2)	Harris (5)		
5 June	14	London Broncos	H	York Community Stadium	W	36–34	Harris (2), Thompson, Marsh, Towse (2)	Ellis (6)		
12 June	15	Widnes Vikings	A	DCBL Stadium	W	16–14	Brown (2), Marsh	Ellis (2)		
26 June	16	Whitehaven	A	Recreation Ground	W	40–16	Thompson, Ellis, Towse (2), Antrobus, Brown, O'Hagan	Ellis (5), Harris		
3 July	17	Barrow Raiders	H	York Community Stadium	L	16–24	Brown, Pauli, Glover	Ellis, Harris		
11 July	18	Halifax Panthers	A	The Shay	L	10–36	Clarkson, Jubb	Harris	1,621	
18 July	19	Batley Bulldogs	H	York Community Stadium	L	16–32	Harris, Towse, Kirmond	Harris (2)		
24 July	20	Featherstone Rovers	A	Post Office Road	L	22–30	Towse, Brown, Ward, O'Hagan	Glover, Harris (2)		
31 July	21	Newcastle Thunder	N	Headingley Stadium	W	27–18	Brown (2), Marsh, Glover, Kirmond	Harris (3)	4,011	
7 August	22	Dewsbury Rams	A	Crown Flatt	W	22–10	Harris, Hingano, Marsh (2)	Harris, Glover (2)	711	
15 August	23	Bradford Bulls	H	York Community Stadium	L	16–20	Jubb, Marsh, Brown	Glover (2)		
21 August	24	Leigh Centurions	A	Leigh Sports Village	L	4–100	Brown		2,744	
26 August	25	Sheffield Eagles	H	York Community Stadium	W	20–12	Marsh, Antrobus, Harris, Glover	Glover (2)		
3 September	26	Newcastle Thunder	A	Kingston Park	W	24–18	Glover, O'Hagan, Brown, Inman	Harris (3)		
11 September	27	Workington Town	H	York Community Stadium	W	74–12	Michael, Harris (3), Kirmond, Brown (2), Glover (2), Porter, Inman, O'Hagan, Clarkson	Harris (2), Glover (9)		

==== Play-offs ====
Play-off results
Date	Round	Versus	H/A	Venue	Result	Score	Tries	Goals	Attendance	Report
18 September	Eliminators	Halifax Panthers	A	The Shay	W	26–24	Brown, Jubb, Harris, Edwards	Glover (2)	1,850	
25 September	Semi-finals	Leigh Centurions	A	Leigh Sports Village	L	10–70	Marsh, Stock	Harris	3,329	

===== Team bracket =====
Eliminators
3	Halifax Panthers	24
6	York City Knights	26
4	Barrow Raiders	8
5	Batley Bulldogs	18

Semi-finals
1	Leigh Centurions	70
6	York City Knights	10
2	Featherstone Rovers	28
5	Batley Bulldogs	32

Grand Final
1	Leigh Centurions	44
5	Batley Bulldogs	12

=== Challenge Cup ===
W Win L Loss

Challenge Cup results
Date	Round	Versus	H/A	Venue	Result	Score	Tries	Goals	Attendance	Report
27 February	4	Newcastle Thunder	H	York Community Stadium	W	42–13	Ellis, Dixon, Marsh (2), Harris, Stock, Ward	Ellis (7)	1,221	
13 March	5	Whitehaven	A	Recreation Ground	L	12–38	O'Hagan, Brown	Harris (2)	798	

== Players ==
=== Squad ===
York City Knights 2022 Squad
First team squad			Coaching staff
1 Matty Marsh; 2 Joe Brown; 3 James Glover; 4 Jacob Ogden; 5 Will Oakes; 6 Brendan O'Hagan; 7 Jamie Ellis; 8 Masi Matongo; 9 Will Jubb; 10 Jack Teanby; 11 Chris Clarkson (c); 12 Pauli Pauli; 13 Jordan Thompson	14 Sam Davis; 15 Ata Hingano; 15 Ronan Dixon; 16 Marcus Stock; 17 Danny Kirmond; 18 "In Memory of our Fans"; 19 Liam Harris; 20 Kristian Brining; 21 Toby Warren; 22 Myles Harrison; 23 AJ Towse; 24 Ronan Michael; 25 Jack Logan	26 Brad Ward; 26/33 Olly Butterworth; 27 Levi Edwards; 28 Bailey Antrobus; 29 Joe Porter; – Ben Barnard; – Tom Inman	Head coach: James Ford; Legend: (c) Captain(s); (vc) Vice-captain(s); Updated: Source(s): Rugby League Project; Love Rugby League; York City Knights

=== 2022 transfers ===
Gains

List of players joining York
Player	Club	Contract	Date
Joe Brown	Bradford Bulls	1 Year	September 2021
Jamie Ellis	Leigh Centurions	1 Year	September 2022
Liam Harris	Halifax Panthers	1 Year	October 2021
Sam Davis	London Broncos	1 Year	October 2021
Jacob Ogden	London Broncos	2 Years	October 2021
Will Oakes	Dewsbury Rams	1 Year	October 2021
Masi Matongo	Hull F.C.	1 Year	October 2021
Pauli Pauli	Salford Red Devils	1 Year	October 2021
Olly Butterworth	Sheffield Eagles	1 Year	October 2021
Jack Logan	Leigh Centurions	1 Year	November 2021
Ronan Michael	Huddersfield Giants	Season loan	November 2021
James Glover	Sheffield Eagles	1 Year	October 2021
Jordan Thompson	Leigh Centurions	1 Year	October 2021
Brad Ward	Hull KR	2 Years	January 2022
Levi Edwards	Leeds Rhinos	Season loan	March 2022
Bailey Antrobus	St. George Illawarra Dragons	End of season	May 2022
Ata Hingano	Leigh Centurions	Loan to end of season	July 2022
Tom Inman	Warrington Wolves	End of season	July 2022
Ben Barnard	Heworth	Trialist	September 2022

Losses

List of players leaving York
Player	Club	Contract	Date
James Green	Retired		July 2021
Jordan Baldwinson	Bradford Bulls	2 Year	September 2021
Ryan Atkins	Retired		September 2021
Danny Washbrook	Retired		September 2021
Tim Spears	Retired		September 2021
Morgan Smith	Featherstone Rovers	1 Year	October 2021
Sam Scott	Bradford Bulls	1 Year	October 2021
Jason Bass	Sheffield Eagles	1 Year	November 2021
Ben Jones-Bishop	Sheffield Eagles	1 Year	November 2021
Kieran Dixon	Leigh Centurions		January 2022
Jack Logan	Retired		February 2022
Kristian Brining	Retired		April 2022

=== Internationals ===
Several York players were selected for 2021 World Cup squads:

- Ireland
  - Ronan Michael
  - Brendan O'Hagan
- Jamaica
  - Jacob Ogden
- Scotland
  - Jack Teanby
- Wales
  - Bailey Antrobus
