= 2023 York Knights season =

Rugby league team season

York Knights 2023 season
- 2023 RFL Championship Rank: 6th
- Play-off result: lost in Eliminators
- Challenge Cup: quarter-finals
- RFL 1895 Cup: semi-finals

Team information
- Chairman: Clint Goodchild
- Head Coach: Andrew Henderson
- Captain: Chris Clarkson
- Stadium: York Community Stadium
Principal colours	Alternate colours
← 2022	List of seasons	2024 →

In the 2023 rugby league season, the York Knights competed in the 2023 RFL Championship, the 2023 Challenge Cup and the 2023 RFL 1895 Cup. This was the first season in which the team competed as the York Knights following the club changing its name to York RLFC from the York City Knights in October 2022.

York had an inconsistent first part of the season where after a strong start they were fourth in the league having won three of their opening five league games. They then had a run of four league defeats and put together back-to-back league wins once more before having a mid-season run of five losses that left York near the bottom of the table. Their league form changed in July from which point they won 10 of their final 11 league matches to finish in sixth-place and equal their position from the previous season. In the Challenge Cup, York reached the quarter-finals for the first time since 2004 and the team also qualified for the semi-finals of the 1895 Cup.

== Summary ==
=== Pre-season ===
On 14 October 2022, the York City Knights announced the club had been renamed as York RLFC, with the men's team being known as the York Knights and the women's team being rebranded as York Valkyrie. On 17 October, Andrew Henderson was appointed as head coach replacing James Ford who had recently left to take a coaching role at Wakefield Trinity. In November, Danny Kirmond took on the role of player/assistant coach and in January Ged Corcoran was also appointed as an assistant coach.

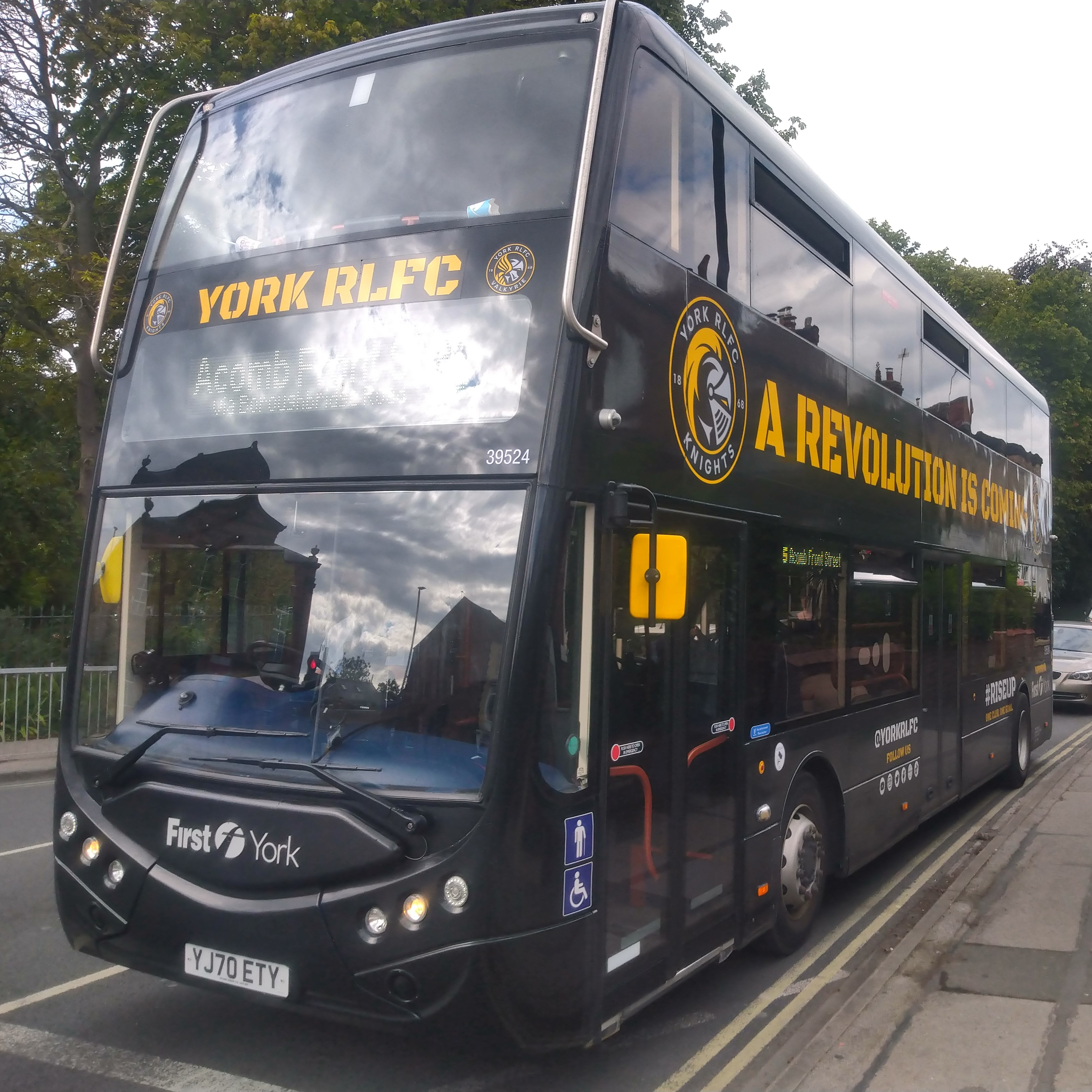
First York bus promoting York RLFC's re-branding

In a pre-season interview Henderson noted several factors that had influenced preparations for the upcoming campaign, including that the majority of new signings for the season had been made before his arrival, and that some of the players required time off to recover following the 2021 World Cup. Several York players had been called up to represent national teams at the tournament, which took place in October and November 2022, but before the start of the 2023 season two of them, Jacob Ogden and Brendan O'Hagan, had asked to be released from their contracts at York.

York played only one pre-season match, a 28–12 away win at League 1 side Doncaster. The following week, their home friendly against Batley Bulldogs was cancelled due to the pitch being frozen. At the start of February, Love Rugby League's season preview predicted York would repeat their 2022 season to finish sixth in the table.

=== 2023 season ===
York's season began on 5 February with a home loss to Widnes Vikings in the Championship. They then recorded a home win against Bradford Bulls before travelling to Toulouse Olympique where they lost 36–0. Two league wins, against Barrow Raiders and Swinton Lions, were followed on 12 March by a win over NCL Division One side West Bowling in the third round of the Challenge Cup. The match saw Matty Marsh make his 100th appearance for York. In mid-March, BBC Sport selected York's fourth round Challenge Cup match against Sheffield Eagles to be shown on its iPlayer service. Both clubs were in the top four of the Championship at the time, but York then lost their next two league games slipping to ninth in the table with head coach Andrew Henderson commenting that York's "performances certainly haven't been at the standard that we expect from ourselves as a group". In the cup match, York had a 20–0 lead over Sheffield when Danny Kirmond, who had scored two of York's tries, was sent-off after 30 minutes, but the team held on to win the match 24–22.

Back in the Championship, York's run of losses continued with a 22–10 defeat to Keighley Cougars and an away loss to Halifax Panthers. that saw York drop to tenth in the table. York then had a series of home matches against two teams that they had done well against in recent meetings; Newcastle Thunder and London Broncos. On 21 April, York defeated Newcastle 22–18 in the fifth round of the Challenge Cup. The win also earned York a place in the semi-finals of the 1895 Cup later in the year. York then won 30–28 against London in a match played as a double header with the Women's Challenge Cup match between York Valkyrie and Hull Kingston Rovers. For the matches, which took place on Heritage Weekend, both York teams wore shirts in black and gold hoops inspired by the York side that reached the semi-finals of the 1983–84 Challenge Cup. The Knights followed this with a league win over Newcastle before recording a 36–12 win over London in the sixth round of the cup which saw York qualify for the quarter-finals for the first time since 2004 and become the only remaining Championship side in the competition.

York were back at the York Community Stadium the next week, this time as the nominal away side as they faced Featherstone Rovers in the Summer Bash. Their 46–16 defeat to the team at the top of the league was the start of a run of five losses in the Championship, during which time York were also knocked out the Challenge Cup at the quarter-finals stage. The cup match was played alongside the women's match between York Valkyrie and Cardiff Demons, on what was the first time that a double-header of men's and women's Challenge Cup quarter-final matches had been hosted at one venue. York Knights held the lead against Super League side Leigh Leopards until the last twenty minutes but went on to lose 34–14 and exited the competition.

York's from began to improve at the start of July with a 28–12 win over Halifax Panthers which moved them up to tenth in the league and seven points off the bottom of the table. This was followed by wins against Keighley Cougars and Sheffield Eagles that moved York up to ninth place. On 23 July, York played in the semi-final of the 1895 Cup against Batley who were third in the Championship at the time. York could not recover from a 14–0 deficit at half-time and went on to lose the match 22–8. A win over London Broncos then gave York a run of four successive league wins before they hosted second-placed Toulouse at the start of August. After trailing 12–4 at the interval, York fought back to take a two-point lead before Toulouse scored with 10 minutes remaining to win 18–14. York's fightback in their match against Widnes proved more successful when they came from 20–12 down at half-time to win 40–30. After the match, York were still in ninth place, but were now on 20 points and with five matches remaining were still in contention for the play-offs.

York followed this with a 20–6 win at Newcastle Thunder and started September with a 26–22 home win over Swinton Lions. A 20–10 victory at Bradford Bulls kept the winning run going for York as they headed into their round 26 match against Batley. After going 10–0 down, York recovered to go in 14–10 at the interval. Batley then levelled midway through the second half but a late drop goal from Liam Harris was enough to give York a 15–14 win and moved them up to seventh in the table just a point behind Halifax. York then won their final match of the regular season away to Barrow and, with a Halifax loss to Swinton, they moved up into sixth-place to claim the final play-off spot. In the opening round of the play-offs, York travelled to Bradford where after taking an 8–0 lead, York could not withstand a Bradford fightback that ended York's season with a 22–8 defeat.

=== Post-season ===
At the end-of-year awards, Andrew Henderson was nominated as Championship Coach of the Year and AJ Towse was nominated for Championship Young Player of the Year for a second time. Both lost out to London Broncos' nominees Mike Eccles (coach) and Bill Leyland (young player), however there was some success for York RLFC with York Valkyrie, who had won the Women's Super League, picking up the Coach of the Year (Lindsay Anfield) and Woman of Steel awards (Sinead Peach), and York's wheelchair team winning the Wheelchair Rugby League Club of the Year Award.

In October, York were awarded a provisional Grade B ranking under the newly introduced IMG Grading system. Their score of 10.05 placed them at 17th in the rankings.

York captain Chris Clarkson, who had joined the club ahead of the 2020 campaign, announced that he would retire at the end of the season. Also announcing his retirement was Danny Kirmond who re-joined former club Wakefield in a coaching role. Other departures included Pauli Pauli, who had missed much of the season through injury, and Matty Marsh who signed for Sheffield Eagles at the end of the year along with James Glover who had been on loan there since July and made his move permanent for the 2024 season.

== Results ==
=== Pre-season friendlies ===
W Win L Loss – Postponed/Cancelled

Pre-season results
Date	Versus	H/A	Venue	Result	Score	Tries	Goals	Attendance	Report
15 January	Doncaster	A	Eco-Power Stadium	W	28–12	Marsh (2), Hingano, Fitzsimmons, Daley, Glover	Harris (2)		
22 January	Batley Bulldogs	H	York Community Stadium	–	C–C	Cancelled due to frozen pitch			

=== Championship ===
==== League table ====
Pos	Team	Pld	W	D	L	PF	PA	PD	Pts	Qualification
1	Featherstone Rovers	27	25	0	2	1079	295	+784	50	League Leaders Shield and qualify for semi-finals
2	Toulouse Olympique	27	19	0	8	834	385	+449	38	Semi-finals
3	Bradford Bulls	27	16	1	10	677	572	+105	33	Eliminators
4	Sheffield Eagles	27	16	0	11	780	560	+220	32	Eliminators
5	London Broncos	27	16	0	11	600	552	+48	32	Eliminators
6	York Knights	27	15	0	12	557	557	0	30	Eliminators
7	Batley Bulldogs	27	15	0	12	506	519	−13	30	
8	Halifax Panthers	27	14	1	12	690	572	+118	29	
9	Widnes Vikings	27	13	0	14	619	654	−35	26	
10	Swinton Lions	27	9	0	18	426	739	−313	18	
11	Barrow Raiders	27	8	1	18	471	672	−201	17	
12	Whitehaven	27	8	0	19	481	809	−328	16	
13	Keighley Cougars	27	8	0	19	506	837	−331	16	Relegation to League One
14	Newcastle Thunder	27	5	1	21	415	918	−503	11	Relegation to League One

Source: RFL
Rules for classification: 1) Competition points; 2) Points difference; 3) Points percentage (points scored/points conceded x 100)

==== Championship results ====
W Win D Draw L Loss

Championship results
Date	Round	Versus	H/A	Venue	Result	Score	Tries	Goals	Attendance	Report
5 February	1	Widnes Vikings	H	York Community Stadium	L	12–19	Brown, Kirmond	Glover (2)	2,117	
13 February	2	Bradford Bulls	H	York Community Stadium	W	32–16	Daley, Jubb, Kirby, Michael	Glover (8)	2,381	
18 February	3	Toulouse Olympique	A	Stade Ernest-Wallon	L	0–36			2,761	
26 February	4	Barrow Raiders	H	York Community Stadium	W	28–14	Brown, Dee, Harrison, Hingano, Kirby	Glover (4)	1,525	
5 March	5	Swinton Lions	A	Heywood Road	W	40–0	Brown (2), Harrison (2), Towse (2), Daley, Hingano	Glover (4)	1,029	
19 March	6	Whitehaven	H	York Community Stadium	L	12–14	Marsh, Towse	Glover (2)	1,614	
26 March	7	Featherstone Rovers	A	Millennium Stadium	L	4–46	Glover		2,892	
7 April	8	Keighley Cougars	H	York Community Stadium	L	10–22	Antrobus, Harris	Glover	2,168	
16 April	9	Halifax Panthers	A	The Shay	L	6–16	Glover	Glover	1,454	
7 May	10	London Broncos	H	York Community Stadium	W	30–28	Towse (3), Clarkson, Ta'ai	Glover (5)	1,802	
14 May	11	Newcastle Thunder	H	York Community Stadium	W	26–22	Field (2), Brown, Glover, Pratt, Towse	Glover	2,278	
27 May	12 (Note: Summer Bash)	Featherstone Rovers	A	York Community Stadium	L	16–46	Brown, Daley, Dee	Glover (2)	3,793	
4 June	13	Batley Bulldogs	A	Fox's Biscuits Stadium	L	8–14	Dee, Glover		2,991	
9 June	14	Sheffield Eagles	A	Olympic Legacy Park	L	10–40	Clarkson, Fitzsimmons	Brown	1,051	
25 June	16	Featherstone Rovers	H	York Community Stadium	L	8–24	Hingano, Towse		2,554	
28 June	15 (Note: Date changed due to York's Challenge Cup quarter-final match)	Whitehaven	A	LEL Areana	L	24–26	Towse (2), Kirmond, Pratt, Santi	Harrison (2)	951	
2 July	17	Halifax Panthers	H	York Community Stadium	W	28–18	Harrison (2), Cunningham, Dee, Towse	Harrison (4)	1,823	
9 July	18	Keighley Cougars	A	Cougar Park	W	50–10	Dee (3), Brown (2), Field, Fitzsimmons, Towse	Harrison (9)	1,654	
16 July	19	Sheffield Eagles	H	York Community Stadium	W	23–18	Bass, Dee, Harris, Thompson	Harris (3 + Drop goal)	2,266	
30 July	20	London Broncos	A	Cherry Red Records Stadium	W	24–10	Bass, Field, Fitzsimmons, Jubb	Harris (4)	957	
5 August	21	Toulouse Olympique	H	York Community Stadium	L	14–18	Bass (2), Santi	Harris	1,483	
20 August	21	Widnes Vikings	A	DCBL Stadium	W	40–30	Field (2), Dee, Fitzsimmons, Pemberton, Pratt, Towse	Harris (6)	3,008	
25 August	22	Newcastle Thunder	A	Kingston Park	W	20–6	Harrison (2), Jubb	Harris (4)	788	
3 September	24	Swinton Lions	H	York Community Stadium	W	26–22	Pratt (2), Jubb, Thompson	Harris (5)	2,114	
10 September	25	Bradford Bulls	A	Odsal Stadium	W	20–10	Fitzsimmons, Harrison, Towse	Harris (4)	3,603	
18 September	26	Batley Bulldogs	H	York Community Stadium	W	15–14	Brown, Pratt, Towse	Harris (1 + Drop goal)	2,377	
24 September	27	Barrow Raiders	A	Prestige Stadium	W	31–18	Field, Michael, Santi, Ta'ai, Towse	Harris (5 + Drop goal)	2,292	

==== Play-offs ====
Play-off results
Date	Round	Versus	H/A	Venue	Result	Score	Tries	Goals	Attendance	Report
1 October	Eliminators	Bradford Bulls	A	Odsal Stadium	L	8–22	Dee	Harris (2)	2,738	

=== Challenge Cup / 1895 Cup ===
In the 2023 season, the Challenge Cup and the RFL 1895 Cup used a format where the four non-Super League sides which progressed to the sixth round of the Challenge Cup qualified for the semi-finals of the 1895 Cup.

W Win L Loss

Challenge Cup / 1895 Cup results
Date	Round		Versus	H/A	Venue	Result	Score	Tries	Goals	Attendance	Report
Date	Challenge Cup	1895 Cup	Versus	H/A	Venue	Result	Score	Tries	Goals	Attendance	Report
12 March	3	—N/a	West Bowling	H	York Community Stadium	W	52–12	Antrobus (2), Harris (2), Ward (2), Brown, Kirmond, Marsh, Towse	Harris (6)	1,040	
2 April	4	—N/a	Sheffield Eagles	H	York Community Stadium	W	24–22	Kirmond (2), Fitzsimmons, Harrison, Towse	Glover (2)	832	
21 April	5	—N/a	Newcastle Thunder	H	York Community Stadium	W	22–18	Brown, Harris, Marsh, Towse	Glover (3)	1,100	
21 May	6	—N/a	London Broncos	H	York Community Stadium	W	36–12	Butterworth (3), Brown, Daley, Dee, Thompson	Glover (4)	951	
18 June	Quarter-final	—N/a	Leigh Leopards	H	York Community Stadium	L	14–34	Brown, Harrison	Harrison (3)	2,412	
23 July	—N/a	Semi-final	Batley Bulldogs	H	York Community Stadium	L	8–22	Harris, Towse		1,646	

== Players ==
=== Squad ===
On 12 January 2023, York Knights announced their squad numbers 1–27 for the 2023 season.

York Knights 2023 Squad
Initial first team squad		Other players	Coaching staff
1 Matty Marsh; 2 Joe Brown; 3 James Glover; 4 Jesse Dee; 5 AJ Towse; 6 Ata Hingano; 7 Liam Harris; 8 Jon Luke Kirby; 9 Will Jubb; 10 Conor Fitzsimmons; 11 Chris Clarkson (c); 12 Danny Kirmond; 13 Jordan Thompson	14 Brendan O'Hagan; 15 Myles Harrison; 16 Bailey Antrobus; 17 Ronan Michael; 19 Josh Daley; 20 Jack Teanby; 21 Ukuma Ta'ai; 22 Pauli Pauli; 23 Olly Butterworth; 24 Ben Barnard; 25 Brad Ward; 26 Jamie Ellis; 27 Harry Price	Toby Warren; Taylor Pemberton; 14 James Cunningham; 28 Jason Bass; 28 Adam Jones; 29 Connor Barley; 30 Brenden Santi; 31 Levi Edwards; 32 Oli Field; 33 Oli Pratt	Head coach: Andrew Henderson; Assistant coaches: Ged Corcoran; Danny Kirmond; Legend: (c) Captain(s); (vc) Vice-captain(s); Updated: Source(s):

=== 2023 transfers ===
Gains

List of players joining York
Player	Club	Contract	Date
Ata Hingano	Leigh Leopards	3 Years (Note: on loan at York in 2022 season)	July 2022
Josh Daley	Mounties	1 Year	September 2022
Ukuma Ta'ai	Newcastle Thunder	2 Years	September 2022
Jesse Dee	Newcastle Thunder	2 Years	September 2022
Ronan Michael	Huddersfield Giants	2 Years	October 2022
Conor Fitzsimmons	Workington Town	2 Years	October 2022
Ben Barnard	Heworth (Note: trialist at York in the 2022 season)	2 Years	October 2022
Bailey Antrobus	St. George Illawarra Dragons	1 Year	October 2022
Jon Luke Kirby	Huddersfield Giants	1 Year	November 2022
Harry Price	Hull Kingston Rovers	1 Year	January 2023
James Cunningham	Toulouse Olympique	2 Years	February 2023
Levi Edwards	Leeds Rhinos	3 Years	February 2023
Connor Barley	Hull Kingston Rovers	Season loan	March 2023
Oli Field	Leeds Rhinos	1 Month	March 2023
Oli Field	Leeds Rhinos	End of season	May 2023
Oli Pratt	Wakefield Trinity	Loan to end of season	May 2023
Brenden Santi	Keighley Cougars	End of season	June 2023
Adam Jones	Wigan Warriors	1 Month loan	June 2023
Reagan Sumner	Wigan Warriors	1 Month loan	June 2023
Jason Bass	Sheffield Eagles	Loan to end of season (Note: loan swap with Jason Bass coming to York and James Glover going to Sheffield Eagles, both on loan until the end of the season)	July 2023
Toby Warren	Leeds Rhinos	Loan to end of season	August 2023
Taylor Pemberton	St Helens	Loan to end of season	August 2023

Losses

List of players leaving York
Player	Club	Contract	Date
Toby Warren	Leeds Rhinos	4 Years	September 2022
Sam Davis	London Broncos	(Note: on loan with London Broncos in 2022 season)	September 2022
Marcus Stock	London Broncos		October 2022
Tom Inman	Halifax Panthers	2 Years	October 2022
Jacob Ogden	Released	-	November 2022
Ronan Dixon	Dewsbury Rams	1 Year	November 2022
Brendan O'Hagan	Released	-	January 2023
Masi Matongo	Released	-	
Will Oakes	Released	-	
Joe Porter	Retired	-	
Jamie Ellis	Swinton Lions	1 Month loan	May 2023
James Glover	Sheffield Eagles	Loan to end of season	July 2023
