= 2021 York City Knights season =

Rugby league team season

York City Knights 2021 season
- 2021 RFL Championship Rank: 9th
- Play-off result: N/A
- Challenge Cup: 3rd round
- RFL 1895 Cup: Runners-up

Team information
- Chairman: Jon Flatman
- Head Coach: James Ford
- Stadium: York Community Stadium
Home colours	Away colours
← 2020	List of seasons	2022 →

In the 2021 rugby league season, York City Knights competed in the 2021 RFL Championship, the 2021 Challenge Cup and the 2021 RFL 1895 Cup. It was the first season that the club played at the York Community Stadium. At the RFL end of year awards York was named as the Championship Club of the Year.

== Results ==
=== Pre-season friendlies ===
W Win L Loss

Pre-season results
Date	Versus	H/A	Venue	Result	Score	Tries	Goals	Attendance	Report
11 March	Hull F.C.	H	York Community Stadium	L	22–28	Dean, Jones-Bishop, Salter, Dow-Nikau	Dixon (2), O'Hagan		

=== Championship ===
==== League table ====
Pos	Team	Pld	W	D	L	PF	PA	PP	Pts	PCT	Qualification (Note: Teams must have played at least 70% of scheduled fixtures (16 matches) to qualify for the play-offs. Fixtures involving Toulouse that are cancelled due to quarantine restrictions do not count against either team involved in respect of the 70% requirement.)
1	Toulouse Olympique (Note: Toulouse were awarded the fixture against London scheduled for 17 April after London declined to travel to France. Toulouse are awarded the two competition points and for points scored percentage the score is recorded as a 24–0 win for Toulouse. The game does not count towards the number of games played by London to determine eligibility for the play-offs)	14	14	0	0	698	124	562.9	28	100.00	Championship Leaders' Shield & advance to semi-final
2	Featherstone Rovers	21	20	0	1	943	292	322.9	38 (Note: Featherstone deducted 2 points for breach of the RFL Operational Rules in March 2021.)	90.48	Advance to semi-final
3	Halifax Panthers	21	13	0	8	528	354	149.2	26	61.90	Advance to eliminators
4	Batley Bulldogs	21	13	0	8	561	411	136.5	26	61.90	Advance to eliminators
5	Bradford Bulls	20	12	0	8	514	501	102.6	24	60.00	Advance to eliminators
6	Whitehaven	22	12	1	9	502	524	95.8	25	56.82	Advance to eliminators
7	London Broncos	20	11	1	8	552	579	95.3	21 (Note: London deducted 2 points for breach of the RFL Operational Rules in failing for fulfil the fixture against Toulouse in April 2021.)	52.50	
8	Widnes Vikings	21	9	1	11	494	534	92.5	19	45.24	
9	York City Knights	20	9	0	11	502	477	105.2	18	45.00	
10	Dewsbury Rams	21	8	1	12	360	608	59.2	17	40.48	
11	Newcastle Thunder	20	7	1	12	431	627	68.7	15	37.50	
12	Sheffield Eagles	20	5	3	12	420	665	63.2	13	32.50	
13	Oldham	21	2	1	18	308	748	41.2	5	11.90	Relegated to League 1
14	Swinton Lions	22	2	1	19	404	773	52.3	5	11.36	Relegated to League 1

Rules for classification: 1) win percentage; 2) points scored percentage (points scored divided by points conceded).

==== Championship results ====
W Win D Draw L Loss – Postponed/Cancelled/Expunged

Championship results
Date and time	MW	Versus	H/A	Venue	Result	Score	Tries	Goals	Attendance	TV	Report
3 April, 16:30	1	Toulouse Olympique	H	York Community Stadium	L	6–21	Jones-Bishop	K. Dixon	—N/a (Note: Played behind closed doors due to the COVID-19 pandemic.)		
18 April	2	Sheffield Eagles	H	York Community Stadium	L	14–20	Jubb, K. Dixon, Salter	K. Dixon	—N/a		
25 April	3	Swinton Lions	A	Heywood Road	W	64–16	K. Dixon, R. Dixon (2), Marsh (4), Wynne, Dean (2), Atkins	K. Dixon (10)	—N/a		
2 May	4	Dewsbury Rams	A	Tetley's Stadium	W	30–20	Atkins, Stock, K Dixon, Marsh (2)	K. Dixon (5)	—N/a		
9 May	5	Featherstone Rovers	H	York Community Stadium	L	16–20	Marsh, Salter	K. Dixon (2)	—N/a		
16 May	6	Widnes Vikings	A	Halton Stadium	W	35–14	Scott, Jones-Bishop, Washbrook, Lewis (2)	K. Dixon, Dean (Drop goal)	—N/a		
23 May	7	Oldham	H	York Community Stadium	W	34–6	Jubb (2), K. Dixon, Dean, March, Clarkson	K. Dixon (5)	1,000		
30 May	8	Bradford Bulls	A	Odsal Stadium	L	18–37	K. Dixon, Atkins, Clarkson	K. Dixon (3)	4,000		
12 June	9	Halifax Panthers	A	The Shay	L	6–30	Marsh	K. Dixon	828		
20 June	10	Batley Bulldogs	H	York Community Stadium	L	20–22	Jones-Bishop, K. Dixon (2)	K. Dixon (4)	1,486		
27 June	11	Whitehaven	A	LEL Arena	L	12–37	Baldwinson, K. Dixon	K. Dixon (2)	601		
4 July	12	Newcastle Thunder	H	York Community Stadium	L	26–28	Atkins, Clarkson, Scott, Whiteley	K. Dixon (5)	1,497		
11 July	13	London Broncos	A	Trailfinders Sports Ground	L	22–50	Whiteley, K. Dixon, Jubb, Atkins	K. Dixon (3)	200		
25 July	14	Swinton Lions	H	York Community Stadium	W	46–10	Clarkson, R. Dixon, K. Dixon (2), Kirmond, Marsh (2), Dow-Nikau	K. Dixon (7)	1,344		
1 August	15	Sheffield Eagles	A	Keepmoat Stadium	–	P–P	Match postponed and not rearranged				
8 August	16	Widnes Vikings	H	York Community Stadium	W	34–20	O'Hagan (2), Whiteley, Dow-Nikau (2), Teanby	Marsh (5)	1,386		
14 August	17	Featherstone Rovers	A	Millennium Stadium	L	14–44	Jones-Bishop (2), Marsh	Johnson	2,183		
22 August	18	Whitehaven	H	York Community Stadium	W	30–12	Teanby, Jones-Bishop, Stock, Whiteley, Scott	Marsh (5)	1,460		
29 August	19	Bradford Bulls	H	York Community Stadium	L	18–36	Atkins, Green, Kirmond	K. Dixon (3)	4,000		
3 September	20	Newcastle Thunder	A	Kingston Park	W	29–16	Clarkson, Jones-Bishop, McGowan (2), Whiteley	Harrison (4), Marsh (Drop goal)	922		
12 September	21	Toulouse Olympique	A	Stade Ernest-Wallon	–	P–P	Match postponed and not rearranged				
19 September	22	London Broncos	H	York Community Stadium	W	32–22	Clarkson, Bass, Kirmond, Marsh, Dow-Nikau, Washbrook	Harrison (3)	2,782		

=== Challenge Cup / 1895 Cup ===
In the 2021 season, the Challenge Cup and RFL 1895 Cup used a format where the four sides which progressed from the second round of the Challenge Cup qualified for the 1895 Cup semi-finals.

W Win L Loss

Challenge Cup / 1895 Cup results
Date and time	Round		Versus	H/A	Venue*	Result	Score	Tries	Goals	Attendance	TV	Report
Date and time	Challenge Cup	1895 Cup	Versus	H/A	Venue*	Result	Score	Tries	Goals	Attendance	TV	Report
19 March, 7:45pm	1	1	Sheffield Eagles	A	Keepmoat Stadium	W	30–6	Whiteley (2), Brining, Jones-Bishop, Atkins	K. Dixon (5)	—N/a	The Sportsman	
28 March, 2:30pm	2	2	London Broncos	A	The Rock	W	14–2	Porter, Salter	K. Dixon (3)	—N/a	BBC Red Button	
9 April, 7:45pm	3	—N/a	Wigan Warriors	H	York Community Stadium	L	0–26			—N/a	The Sportsman	
6 June	—N/a	Semi-final	Swinton Lions	H	York Community Stadium	W	36–22	Salter, Stock, Atkins, Brining, Kirmond, Lewis	K. Dixon (6)		The Sportsman	
17 July	—N/a	Final	Featherstone Rovers	N	Wembley Stadium	L	34–41	Jones-Bishop, Stock, Brining, Bass, Lewis, Whiteley	K. Dixon (5)	(Note: The 1895 Cup final was played as the opening match of a double-header with the Challenge Cup final. A separate attendance figure for the 1895 Cup was not reported.)	BBC Red Button	

== Players ==
=== Squad ===
York City Knights 2021 Squad
First team squad			Coaching staff
1 Matty Marsh – FB, SH, SO; 2 Jason Bass – WG; 3 Liam Salter – CE; 4 Ryan Atkins – CE, WG; 5 Kieran Dixon – WG, FB; 6 Brendan O'Hagan – SO, FB, WG; 7 Morgan Smith – SH; 8 Ronan Dixon – PR; 9 Will Jubb – HK; 10 Jack Teanby – PR; 11 Chris Clarkson (c) – SR; 12 Sam Scott – SR; 13 Adam Cuthbertson – LF, PR	14 Kriss Brining – HK; 15 Jordan Baldwinson – PR; 16 Marcus Stock – SR; 17 Danny Kirmond – SR, LF; 18 "Our Fans"; 19 James Green – SR; 20 Tim Spears (vc) – SR, PR; 21 Joe Porter – PR; 22 Perry Whiteley – WG, CE; 23 Ben Jones-Bishop – FB, WG; 24 Daniel Barcoe – LF, SR; 25 AJ Towse – CE, WG, FB; 26 Myles Harrison – HB	27 Toby Warren – PR; 28 Danny Washbrook – LF, SO; 29 Riley Dean – HB; 30 Tyme Dow-Nikau – PR	Head coach: James Ford; Assistant coach: Chris Spurr; Legend: (c) Captain(s); (vc) Vice-captain(s); Updated: 19 April 2021; Source(s):

=== 2021 transfers ===
Gains

List of players joining York
Player	Club	Contract	Date
Ryan Atkins	Wakefield Trinity	1 Year	September 2020
Daniel Barcoe	Wakefield Trinity	1 Year	September 2020
Adam Cuthbertson	Leeds Rhinos	1 Year	September 2020
Kieran Dixon	London Broncos	1 Year	November 2020
Harry Dodd	Wakefield Trinity	1 Year	September 2020
Danny Kirmond	Wakefield Trinity	1 Year	September 2020
Tyme Nikau	North Wales Crusaders	1 Year	September 2020
Brendan O'Hagan	Wests Tigers	1 Year	October 2020
Morgan Smith	London Broncos	1 Year	September 2020
Ben Jones-Bishop	Wakefield Trinity	1 Year	January 2021
Riley Dean	Warrington Wolves	Season loan	February 2021
Yusuf Aydin	Wakefield Trinity	2 Week loan	April 2021
Joe Keyes	Hull Kingston Rovers	2 Week loan	April 2021
Lewis Peachey	Castleford Tigers	2 Week loan	April 2021
Connor Wynne	Hull F.C.	Month loan (Note: recalled after two weeks)	April 2021
Mikey Lewis	Hull Kingston Rovers	Month loan	May 2021
Mikey Lewis	Hull Kingston Rovers	2 Week loan	July 2021
James McDonnell	Wigan Warriors	2 Week loan	May 2021
James McDonnell	Wigan Warriors	Rolling loan	August 2021
Tyla Hepi	Castleford Tigers	2 Week loan	June 2021
Jake Sweeting	Castleford Tigers	2 Week loan	June 2021
Jamie Ellis	Leigh Centurions	2 Week loan	June 2021
Corey Hall	Leeds Rhinos	Loan	July 2021
Corey Johnson	Leeds Rhinos	Loan	July 2021
Aidan McGowan	Huddersfield Giants	Rolling loan	July 2021
Jacob Gannon	Warrington Wolves	Rolling loan	August 2021

Losses

List of players leaving York
Player	Club	Contract	Date
Brad Hey	Hunslet RLFC	1 Year	September 2020
Ben Johnston	Doncaster RLFC	2 Years	September 2020
Josh Jordan-Roberts	Rochdale Hornets	2 Years	August 2020
Connor Robinson	Halifax Panthers	2 Years	September 2020
Elliot Wallis	Hull KR Loan Expiry / Bradford Bulls	1 Year	November 2020
Will Sharp	Released		

=== Internationals ===
Members of the 2021 York squad who earned international caps this year:

- Jamaica
  - Ben Jones-Bishop v. Scotland, 24 October 2021 (Note: Also playing in the match were Jacob Ogden (Jamaica), Joe Brown and Will Oakes (both Scotland) who had all recently signed for York for the 2022 season)
