= Brett Delaney =

Former Australian rugby league footballer

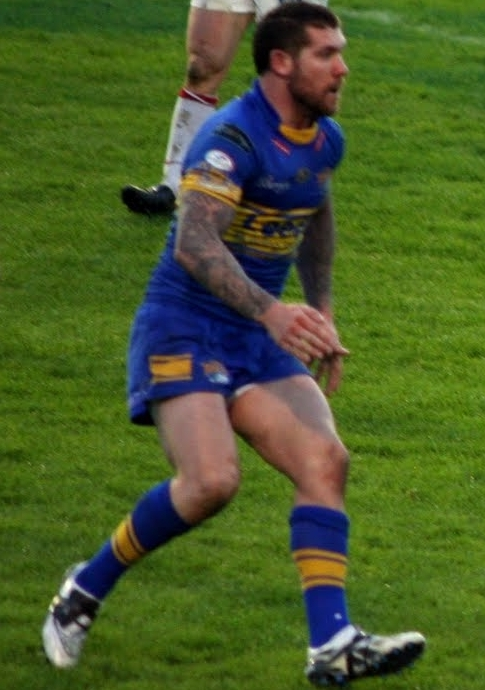

Personal information
- Born: 26 October 1985 (age 40) Baulkham Hills, New South Wales, Australia

Playing information
- Height: 188 cm (6 ft 2 in)
- Weight: 102 kg (16 st 1 lb)
- Position: Second-row, Loose forward, Centre
Club
Years	Team	Pld	T	G	FG	P
2005–06	Parramatta Eels	28	4	27	0	70
2007–09	Gold Coast Titans	63	14	19	0	94
2010–18	Leeds Rhinos	212	27	0	0	108
2015(DR)	→ Hunslet Hawks	1	0	0	0	0
2017(DR)	→ Featherstone Rovers	1	0	0	0	0
	Total	305	45	46	0	272
Representative
Years	Team	Pld	T	G	FG	P
2008	NSW City	1	1	0	0	4

Brett Delaney (born 26 October 1985) is an Australian rugby league coach and former professional rugby league footballer who was most recently assistant coach for Castleford Tigers in the Super League. He played as a centre and second-row forward in the 2000s and 2010s.

He played for Leeds in the Super League and for the Parramatta Eels and Gold Coast Titans in the NRL.

== Background ==
Delaney was born in Baulkham Hills, New South Wales, Australia.

== Career ==
=== Parramatta Eels ===
Delaney began his professional career with the Parramatta Eels. He scored a try on his first grade début against St. George Illawarra in 2005 as the club won the Minor Premiership that year. He went on to make 18 appearances in total for the Parramatta club, scoring four tries. His final game for Parramatta was their 12-6 qualifying final loss to Melbourne.

=== Gold Coast Titans ===
After limited opportunities at the Parramatta, Delaney joined the newly formed club the Gold Coast Titans for the 2007 NRL season. Delaney scored 14 tries in 62 games during his three seasons with the Titans. In 2009, his final season at the club, he helped the team finish in 3rd place in the regular season ladder, which meant the Gold Coast Titans qualified for the play-offs for the first time. Unfortunately for Delaney, a hamstring injury meant he missed the end of the season. He watched from the stands as the Gold Coast crashed out of the play-offs, 27–2 to eventual finalists, & former club, Parramatta.

=== Leeds Rhinos ===
Delaney signed a three-year contract with the Leeds Rhinos, starting in 2010. He was signed as a replacement for Rugby Union bound Lee Smith, who had signed a contract with the London Wasps.

Delaney made his unofficial début for Leeds in Matt Diskin's Testimonial Game at Headingley against the Bradford Bulls. Delaney scored the match winning try in a 12–10 victory. Delaney's official début came on the opening night of the 2010 Super League season against the Crusaders. He scored a try in the 34–6 victory. Delaney made 30 appearances & scored 10 tries during his first season at the Leeds club.

He played in the 2010 Challenge Cup Final defeat by Warrington at Wembley Stadium.

New Leeds coach Brian McDermott started Delaney in the back-row for the first time in his Leeds career in the second game of the 2011 season away against Hull F.C. Delaney impressed in his new role but unfortunately suffered an ankle injury which ruled him out for approximately six weeks. Delaney returned from injury and continued to impress in the back row. That year 2011 Delaney went on to win his first Grand final for Leeds playing at second-row forward. His first three years saw him play in three successive Challenge Cup finals (2010, 2011 and 2012) but Leeds lost all three to Warrington (twice) and Wigan.

He played in the 2011 Challenge Cup Final defeat by Wigan at Wembley Stadium.

Delaney played in the 2011 Super League Grand Final victory over St. Helens at Old Trafford. He played in the 2012 Challenge Cup Final defeat by Warrington at Wembley Stadium. Delaney played in the 2012 Super League Grand Final victory over Warrington at Old Trafford.

Delaney played in the 2014 Challenge Cup Final victory over the Castleford Tigers at Wembley Stadium.

In 2015, the Leeds side made history by going on to win the treble (the League Leaders' Shield, the Challenge Cup Final and Grand Final). He played in the 2015 Super League Grand Final victory over Wigan at Old Trafford.

A facial injury sustained while playing in July 2018 required surgery and at the end of the 2018 season Delaney left Leeds to join Championship side Featherstone for whom he was set to play in the 2019 Championship. However a reoccurrence of the injury necessitating further surgery in a pre-season friendly against Halifax prompted Delaney to announce an end to his playing career in February 2019.

=== Featherstone Rovers ===
On 7 February 2019, Delaney announced his retirement

== Representative career ==
In 2008, Delaney was selected to represent NSW City in the annual City vs Country Origin Game. He scored a try in the 22–22 draw.

== Coaching career ==
=== Early career ===
After retiring from playing in early 2019, Delaney began coaching in the Leeds Rhinos youth system. He spent three years working with the scholarship and academy sides. In 2021, he briefly worked as assistant coach to Brian McDermott when his former Leeds coach joined Oldham in the Championship.

Delaney joined the coaching staff at York City Knights in the Championship for the 2022 season, working as an assistant to James Ford. Partway through the year, he departed to take up a Super League opportunity at Hull KR.

=== Hull Kingston Rovers ===
In July 2022, Delaney joined Hull Kingston Rovers as a forwards coach. He had previously agreed to join from the upcoming 2023 season under Willie Peters, but made the move early following the interim appointment of Danny McGuire. In April 2023, Delaney signed a two-year contract extension with Hull KR alongside fellow coach David Hodgson.

During Delaney's time at Hull KR, the team's defensive record improved from 22.52 points conceded per game in 2022, to 12.07 in 2024. In October 2024, he was linked with a move to Castleford, and his exit from Hull KR was announced on 23 October.

=== Castleford Tigers ===
On 29 October 2024, Castleford Tigers confirmed that Delaney had been appointed assistant coach, working under new head coach Danny McGuire. He would be reunited with McGuire, whom he had played and coached alongside previously, and would lead on defensive coaching and structures.

On 27 May 2026, Castleford announced that Delaney had departed the club.

== Honours ==
=== Club ===
- Super League (4): 2011, 2012, 2015, 2017
- World Club Challenge (1): 2012
- League Leaders' Shield (1): 2015
- Challenge Cup (2): 2014, 2015
- Minor Premiership winner with Parramatta in 2005
