= Christine Pauli =

Samoa international rugby league player (born 1999)

Personal information
- Born: 19 November 1999 (age 26) Bankstown, New South Wales, Australia
- Height: 172 cm (5 ft 8 in)
- Weight: 86 kg (13 st 8 lb)

Playing information
- Position: Second-row
Club
| Years | Team | Pld | T | G | FG | P |
|---|---|---|---|---|---|---|
| 2020 | St George Illawarra | 3 | 0 | 0 | 0 | 0 |
| 2021 | Parramatta Eels | 2 | 0 | 0 | 0 | 0 |
| | Total | 5 | 0 | 0 | 0 | 0 |
Representative
| Years | Team | Pld | T | G | FG | P |
| 2019 | Samoa | 1 | 0 | 0 | 0 | 0 |
- Source: As of 5 November 2023
- Relatives: Pauli Pauli (brother)

Christine Pauli (born 19 November 1999) is an Australian rugby league footballer who last played as a second-row for the Parramatta Eels Women and formerly the St George Illawarra Dragons in the NRL Women's Premiership and the South Sydney Rabbitohs in the NSWRL Women's Premiership.

She is a Samoan international.

== Background ==
Paul was born in Bankstown, New South Wales and is of Samoan descent. She played her junior rugby league for the Mt Druitt Lions. Her older brother, Pauli, is a professional rugby league player for Doncaster RLFC.

== Playing career ==
In 2017, Pauli played for the Parramatta Eels in the Tarsha Gale Cup. In 2018, she joined Penrith Brothers in the NSWRL Women's Premiership. In 2018 and 2019, she represented NSW City at the Women's National Championships.

On 22 June 2019, Pauli represented Samoa in their 46–8 win over New Zealand.

In 2020, Pauli joined the South Sydney Rabbitohs NSWRL Women's Premiership team. In September 2020, she joined the St George Illawarra Dragons NRL Women's Premiership team. In Round 1 of the 2020 NRLW season, she made her debut for the Dragons in an 18–4 loss to the Sydney Roosters.
