= The Sportsman (1865 newspaper) =

British sporting newspaper (1865–1924)

The first British newspaper titled The Sportsman began publishing from 1865, some six years after the Sporting Life. Predominantly concerned with horse racing the paper did cover other sports and continued to be published until 1924 when it was absorbed into Sporting Life. The last edition was published on Saturday 22 November 1924.

It was at the offices of The Sportsman on 20 July 1871 that the Football Association committee meeting was held which adopted a proposal to establish a knockout competition for the FA's member clubs – the FA Cup.
