= Tim Spears =

English rugby league footballer

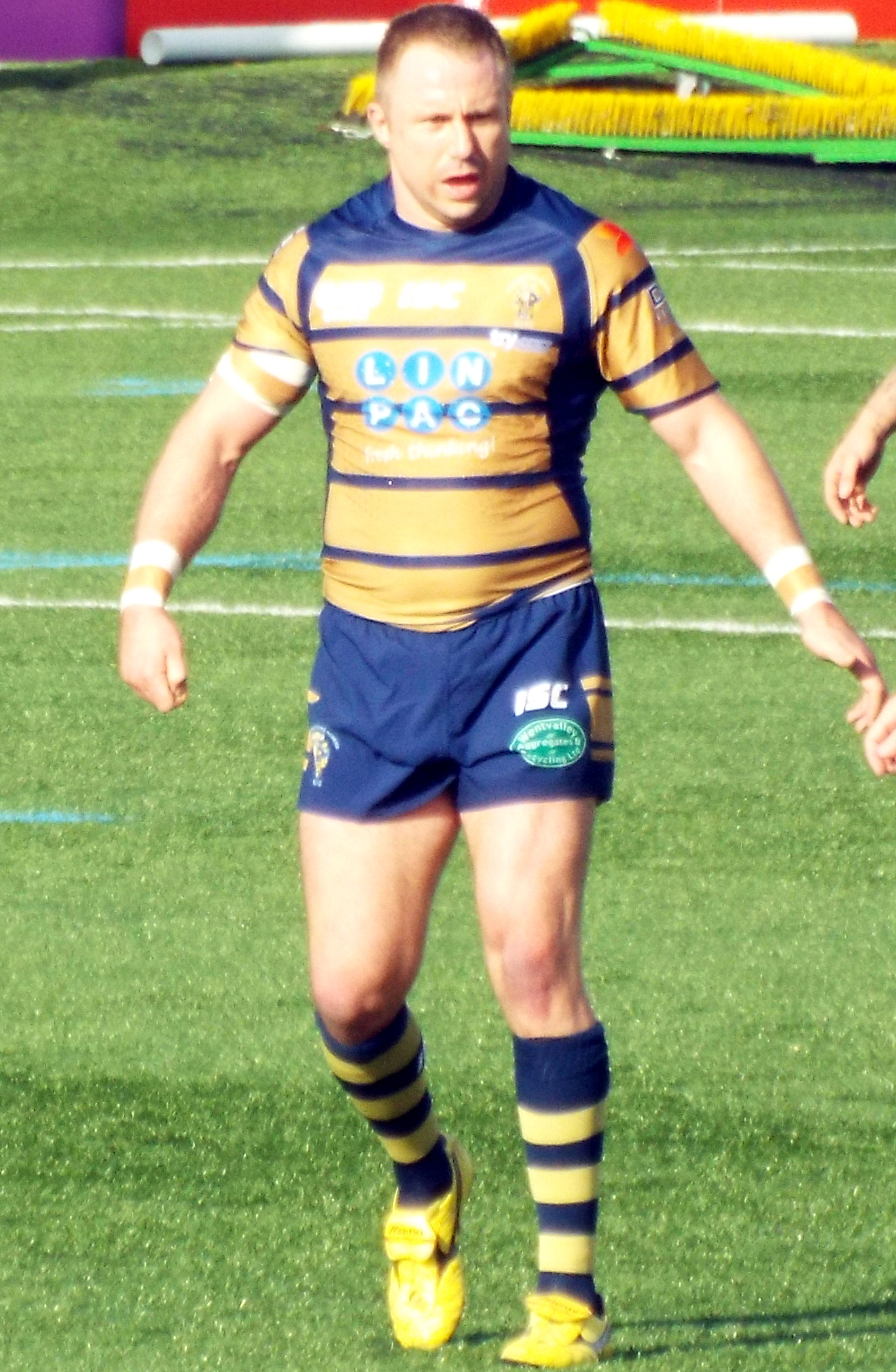

Personal information
- Full name: Tim Spears
- Born: 27 July 1984 (age 42)
- Height: 5 ft 11 in (1.80 m)
- Weight: 15 st 1 lb (96 kg)

Playing information
- Position: Second-row, Loose forward
Club
Years	Team	Pld	T	G	FG	P
2003–04	Castleford Tigers	3	0	0	0	0
2004(loan)	→ Dewsbury Rams	6	0	0	0	0
2004–08	Batley Bulldogs	113	11	0	0	44
2009–16	Featherstone Rovers	201	21	0	0	84
2017–21	York City Knights	92	10	0	0	40
	Total	415	42	0	0	168
- Source: As of 26 March 2016

Tim Spears (born 27 July 1984) is a rugby league footballer who played as a second-row and loose forward for the York City Knights in Championship.

He has previously played for the Castleford Tigers in the Super League, the Dewsbury Rams, the Batley Bulldogs and Featherstone Rovers (captain).

Spears joined Featherstone in 2009 and was part of the team that topped the Championship for four consecutive seasons before being appointed captain for the 2014 season. In January 2014, Spears lay claim the fastest ever rugby league try when it took just 7.7 seconds to score from the kick off in a trial game against Wakefield Trinity Wildcats.

In December 2016 Spears signed a one-year deal with York which was extended for the 2018 season. In September 2021, Spears announced that he would retire at the end of the 2021 season.
