= Pauli Pauli =

Australian rugby league footballer

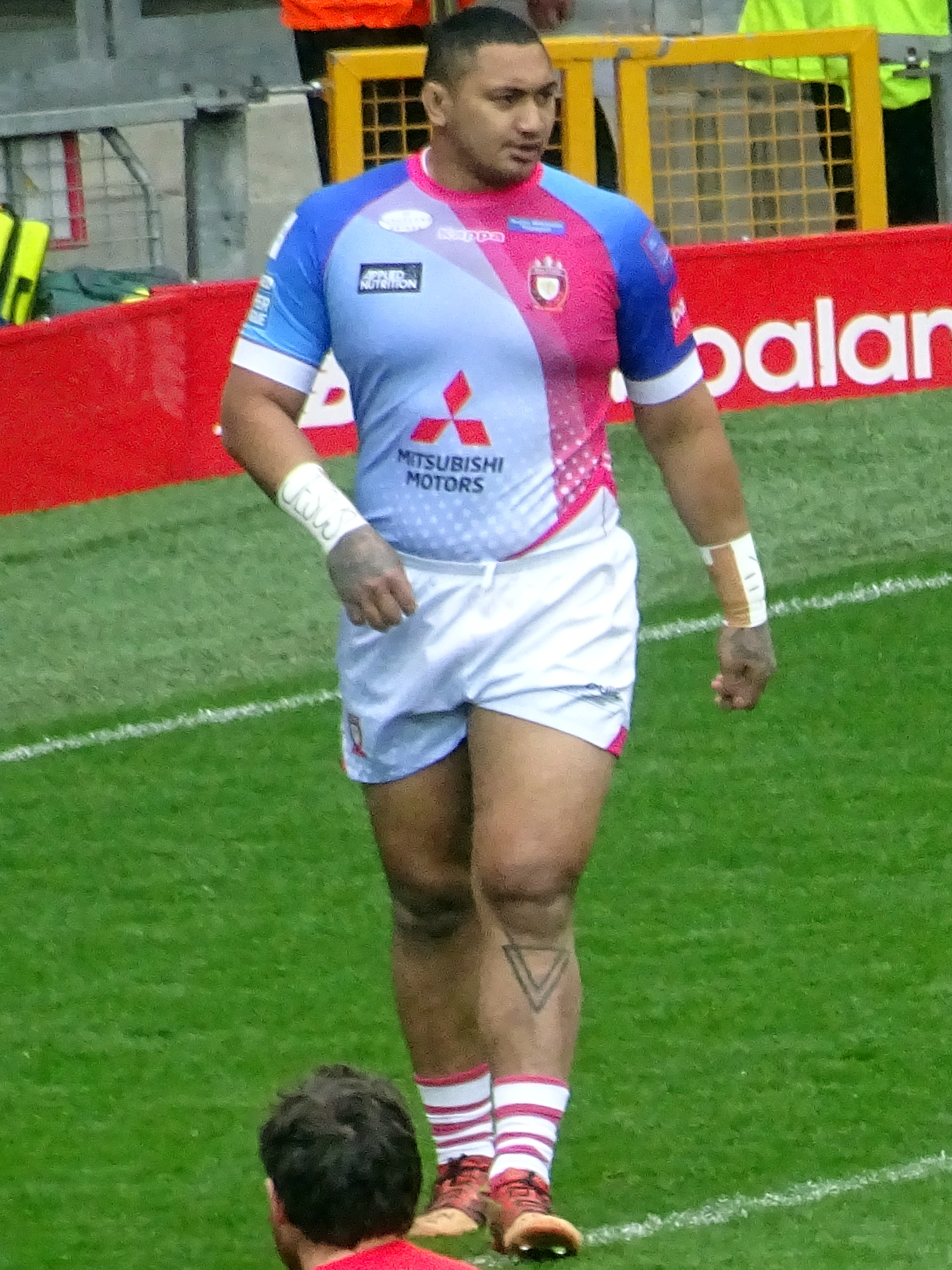

Personal information
- Full name: Nouata Pauli Pauli
- Born: 4 August 1994 (age 32) Silverdale, New South Wales, Australia
- Height: 6 ft 6 in (1.98 m)
- Weight: 21 st 4 lb (135 kg)

Playing information
- Position: Second-row, Prop
Club
Years	Team	Pld	T	G	FG	P
2014–15	Parramatta Eels	33	3	0	0	12
2016–17	Newcastle Knights	15	1	0	0	4
2018–19	Wakefield Trinity	46	10	0	0	40
2019(loan)	→ Salford Red Devils	3	3	0	0	12
2020–21	Salford Red Devils	35	7	0	0	8
2022–23	York Knights	24	2	0	0	8
2024–26	Doncaster	60	21	0	0	84
2026(loan)	→Hunslet	2	0	0	0	0
2027–	Dewsbury Rams	0	0	0	0	0
	Total	218	47	0	0	168
Representative
Years	Team	Pld	T	G	FG	P
2017	City NSW	1	0	0	0	0
2021	Combined Nations All Stars	1	0	0	0	0
- Source: As of 22 November 2026
- Relatives: Christine Pauli (sister)

Nouata Pauli Pauli (born 4 August 1994) is an Australian professional rugby league footballer who plays as a prop or second-row forward for the Dewsbury Rams in the RFL Championship.

He previously played for the Parramatta Eels and the Newcastle Knights in the NRL. Pauli played for Wakefield Trinity in the Super League and spent time in 2019 on loan from Wakefield at the Salford Red Devils in the Super League. He also has played for the New South Wales City side.

== Background ==
Pauli was born in Silverdale, New South Wales, Australia, and is of Samoan descent.

He played his junior rugby league for the Hills District Bulls, before being signed by the Parramatta Eels.

== Playing career ==
=== Early career ===
From 2012 to 2014, Pauli played for the Parramatta Eels' NYC team. In August 2012, he played for the Australian Schoolboys. On 5 July 2013, he re-signed with the Eels on a two-year contract.

=== 2014 ===
In February, Pauli played for the Eels in the inaugural NRL Auckland Nines. In Round 4, he made his NRL debut for the Parramatta club against Penrith, playing off the interchange bench in Parramatta's 32–16 win at Parramatta Stadium. In round 8 against the North Queensland Cowboys at 1300SMILES Stadium, he scored his first NRL career try in Parramatta's 14–42 loss. On 3 May 2014, he played for the New South Wales under-20s team against the Queensland under-20s team, playing in New South Wales' 30–8 win at Penrith Stadium. He finished off his debut year in the NRL having played in 17 matches and scoring three tries for Parramatta. On 8 September 2014, he was named in the Samoa train-on squad for the 2014 Four Nations, but did not make the final 23-man squad.

=== 2015 ===
On 31 January and 1 February, Pauli again played in the NRL Auckland Nines. On 11 July, he re-signed with the Parramatta club on a two-year contract. He finished off the 2015 season having played in 16 matches for Parramatta.

=== 2016 ===
On 29 January, Pauli signed a two-year contract with the Newcastle Knights starting effective immediately, after being released from the final two years of his Parramatta contract. In February, he played for the Knights in the 2016 NRL Auckland Nines.

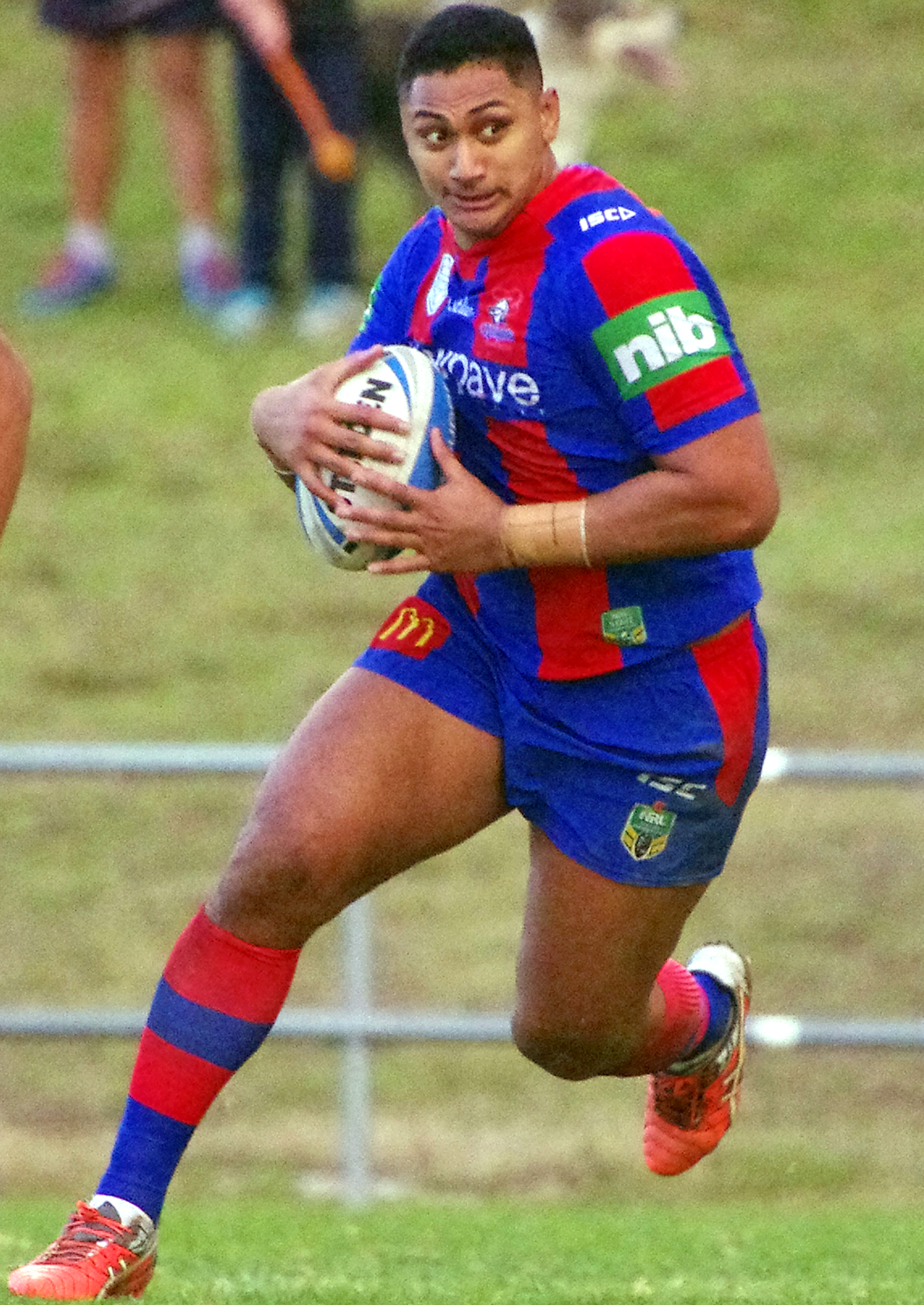
Pauli playing for the Newcastle Knights in 2016

In round 1, he made his club debut for Newcastle against the Gold Coast Titans, playing off the interchange bench in the 12–30 loss at Cbus Super Stadium. In round 12 against his former club Parramatta, he scored his first try for Newcastle outfit. He finished the 2016 season having played in 15 matches and scoring one try.

=== 2017 ===
Pauli was involved in a seven-car pileup on the M1 Pacific Motorway on 18 January 2017, suffering a dislocated hip and was taken to Gosford Hospital.

Whilst continuing his recovery, he featured for the Newcastle side in the Intrust Super Premiership NSW.

Pauli made his representative debut for the New South Wales City side in the final City vs Country Origin match.

After continuing to build up fitness in the Intrust Super Premiership NSW, Pauli's season was ended in July after fracturing his fibula in a match. The injury prevented him from playing another game for the Knights as he was not offered a new contract beyond 2017.

On 22 November 2017, it was announced that Pauli had signed a one-year contract with English Super League side Wakefield Trinity with the option of extending for a further season.

=== 2019 ===
On 14 May 2019, Pauli joined fellow Super League team Salford on a months loan, swapping with Salford Junior Sau. He joined Salford club ahead of the 2020 Super League season.

=== 2020 ===
On 17 October 2020, he played in the 2020 Challenge Cup Final defeat for Salford against Leeds at Wembley Stadium.

=== 2021 ===
On 25 June 2021 he played for the Combined Nations All Stars in their 26–24 victory over England, staged at the Halliwell Jones Stadium, Warrington, as part of England's 2021 Rugby League World Cup preparation.

=== 2022 ===
On 25 October 2021, it was reported that he had signed for York RLFC in the RFL Championship.

=== 2023 ===
On 13 November 2023, it was announced that Pauli would be departing York.

On 17 November 2023, it was reported that he had signed for Doncaster RLFC in the RFL Championship on a two-year deal for the 2024 season.

=== 2026 ===
On 9 October 2026 it was reported that he had signed for Dewsbury Rams in the RFL Championship
