= Kriss Brining =

English rugby league player

Personal information
- Full name: Kristian Brining
- Born: 16 November 1993 (age 32) Scarborough, North Yorkshire, England

Playing information
- Height: 5 ft 10 in (1.79 m)
- Weight: 14 st 0 lb (89 kg)
- Position: Hooker
Club
Years	Team	Pld	T	G	FG	P
2011–16	York City Knights	86	54	0	0	216
2017–18	Salford Red Devils	25	5	0	0	20
2019–22	York City Knights	40	7	0	0	28
	Total	151	66	0	0	264

Kristian Brining (born 16 November 1993) is a former professional rugby league footballer who played as a hooker for the York City Knights in the Championship, and the Salford Red Devils in the Super League.

Brining started at York aged 12 with a scholarship and became the club's youngest-ever player when he made his début in April 2011. In 2017 he made his Salford Super League début against the Wigan Warriors. He returned to York in 2019.

After suffering a series of injuries, Brining retired from the sport in April 2022, aged 28.
