= James Glover (rugby league) =

English rugby league player

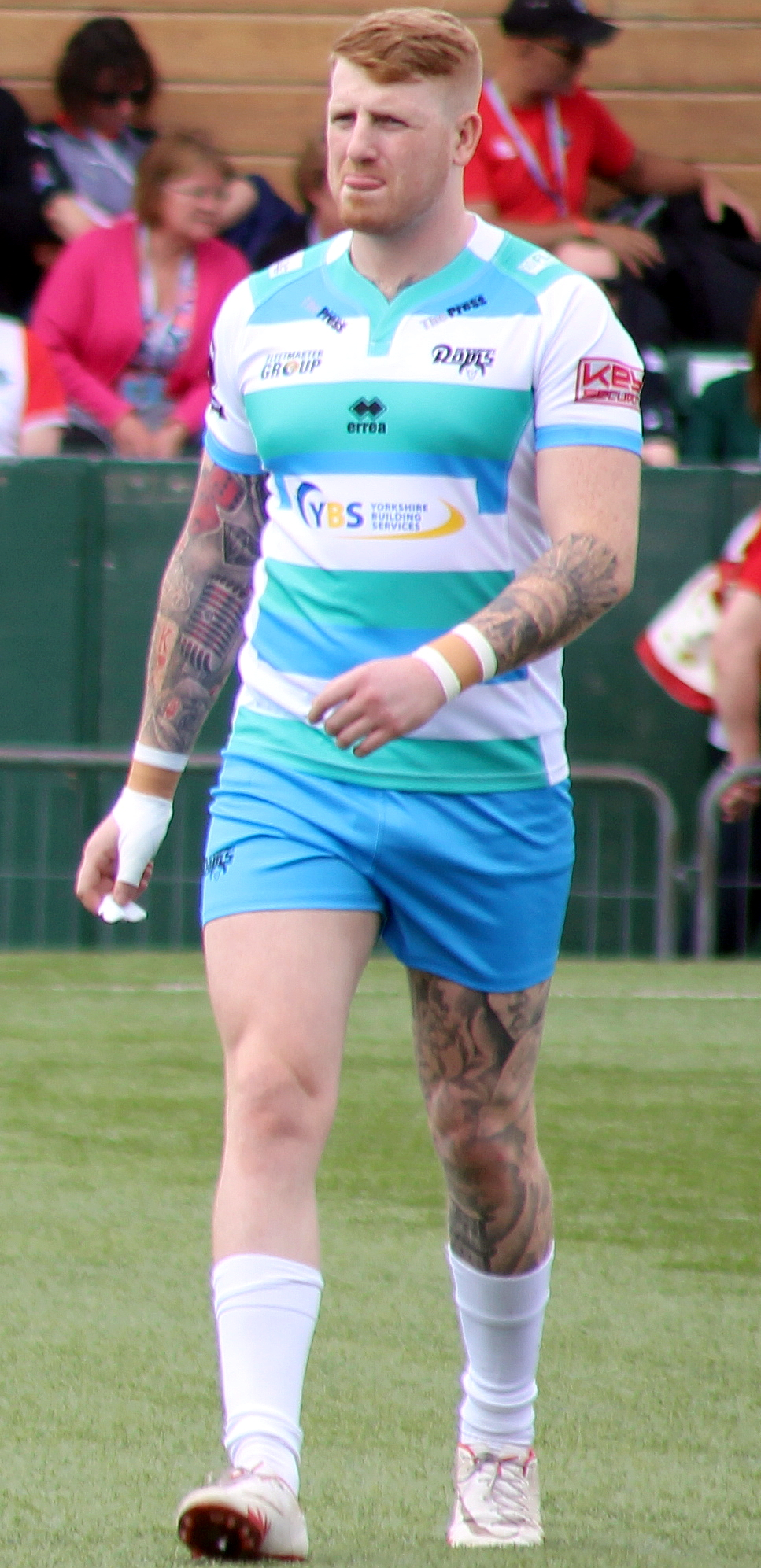

Personal information
- Full name: James Glover
- Born: 2 December 1993 (age 32) Wakefield, Yorkshire, England
- Height: 6 ft 0 in (1.83 m)
- Weight: 14 st 13 lb (95 kg)

Playing information
- Position: Stand-off, Centre, Wing, Scrum-half
Club
Years	Team	Pld	T	G	FG	P
2015–18	Dewsbury Rams	66	24	52	0	200
2016(loan)	→ Hemel Stags	1	0	0	0	0
2019–21	Sheffield Eagles	32	15	3	0	64
2022–23	York Knights	47	17	61	0	190
2023(loan)	→ Sheffield Eagles	10	3	0	0	12
2024–25	Sheffield Eagles	37	22	0	0	88
2025	Featherstone Rovers	15	9	0	0	36
2026–	Doncaster RLFC	0	0	0	0	0
	Total	208	90	116	0	590
- Source: As of 8 November 2025

James Glover (born 2 December 1993) is a professional rugby league footballer who plays as a centre for Doncaster RLFC in the Championship.

Glover has previously played for the Dewsbury Rams and spent time on loan at the Hemel Stags in Kingstone Press League 1.

== Background ==
Glover was born in Wakefield, West Yorkshire, England.

== Career ==
=== Sheffield Eagles ===
In October 2018 Glover joined the Sheffield Eagles on a two-year deal.

After a good start to the 2019 season, Glover suffered a knee injury against Barrow Raiders which put him out of action for 9 months.

=== York Knights ===
Following three seasons with the Eagles it was announced in 2021 that Glover was set to leave the club at the end of the season. In October 2021 he signed for York Knights.

=== Return to Sheffield Eagles ===
During his spell at York Knights it was reported on 6 Jul 2023 that he had re-joined Sheffield Eagles, albeit on loan. On 8 November 2023 it was reported that he had signed for Sheffield on a permanent two-year deal.

=== Doncaster RLFC ===
On 7 November 2025 it was reported that he had signed for Doncaster RLFC in the RFL Championship
