= Ronan Michael =

Ireland international rugby league footballer

Personal information
- Full name: Ronan Michael
- Born: 3 July 2000 (age 26) Balbriggan, Ireland
- Height: 5 ft 11 in (1.81 m)
- Weight: 15 st 10 lb (100 kg)

Playing information

Rugby union
Club
Years	Team	Pld	T	G	FG	P
2018–2019	Clontarf F.C.

Rugby league
- Position: Loose forward, Prop
Club
Years	Team	Pld	T	G	FG	P
2020–22	Huddersfield Giants	1	0	0	0	0
2021(loan)	→ Whitehaven	4	0	0	0	0
2021(loan)	→ Swinton Lions	11	1	0	0	4
2022(loan)	→ York City Knights	19	3	0	0	12
2023–24	York Knights	71	5	0	0	20
2025–26	Bradford Bulls	30	2	0	0	8
2026(loan)	→ Keighley Cougars	3	0	0	0	0
2027–	York Knights	0	0	0	0	0
	Total	139	11	0	0	44
Representative
Years	Team	Pld	T	G	FG	P
2018–	Ireland	9	0	0	0	0
- Source: As of 11 November 2026

Ronan Michael (born 3 July 2000) is an Irish professional rugby league footballer who plays as a prop for the York Knights in the Super League and Ireland at international level.

He previously played for the Huddersfield Giants in the Super League, after progressing through their academy system and spent time on loan from Huddersfield at Whitehaven, York and the Swinton Lions.

== Background ==
Born in Balbriggan to a Canadian-Irish mother and an Antiguan father, Michael grew up playing rugby union.

He began playing rugby league in 2017 for Longhorns RL and was selected to play for Ireland in 2018 and 2019.

== Playing career ==
=== Huddersfield Giants ===
Michael signed an academy contract with the Huddersfield Giants for the 2019 season.

Michael moved to Australia in January 2020 to play for the Canberra Raiders in their Jersey Flegg Cup team (under-20s). He remained contracted to Huddersfield for 2021. He did not play any competition matches for Canberra as the season was cancelled due to the COVID-19 pandemic. He returned home in March 2020.

Michael was named to make his Super League debut for the Huddersfield Giants against the Wigan Warriors in round 20 of the 2020 Super League season. He was the first Irish-born player to play in the Super League since Brian Carney in 2009.

=== Whitehaven (loan) ===
On 29 April 2021 he signed for Whitehaven in the RFL Championship on loan.

=== Swinton Lions (loan) ===
On 27 May 2021 he signed for Swinton Lions in the RFL Championship on a short-term loan. After the initial short-term loan had ended, it was later reported on 22 July 2021 that he had returned to Swinton for the remainder of the 2021 season.

=== York RLFC ===
On 3 October 2022 he signed for York RLFC on a two-year deal after having spent the previous season on loan with the club.

=== Bradford Bulls ===
On 29 August 2024 Michael signed for Bradford Bulls on a two-year deal from the start of the 2025 season.

On 11 April 2026 he was released from his contract with immediate effect through mutual agreement to allow him to pursue regular game time elsewhere

=== Keighley Cougars (loan) ===
Michael signed for Keighley Cougars on a one-month loan in February 2025.

=== Northern Pride ===
On 26 April 2026 Michael signed for Northern Pride in the Queensland Cup. On 10 May Ronan made his Pride debut in a 36–36 draw against Souths Logan Magpies.

=== York RLFC ===
On 11 November 2026, York announced that Michael had returned to the club on a one-year deal, to play in their second Super League season.
