= Bailey Antrobus =

Wales international rugby league footballer

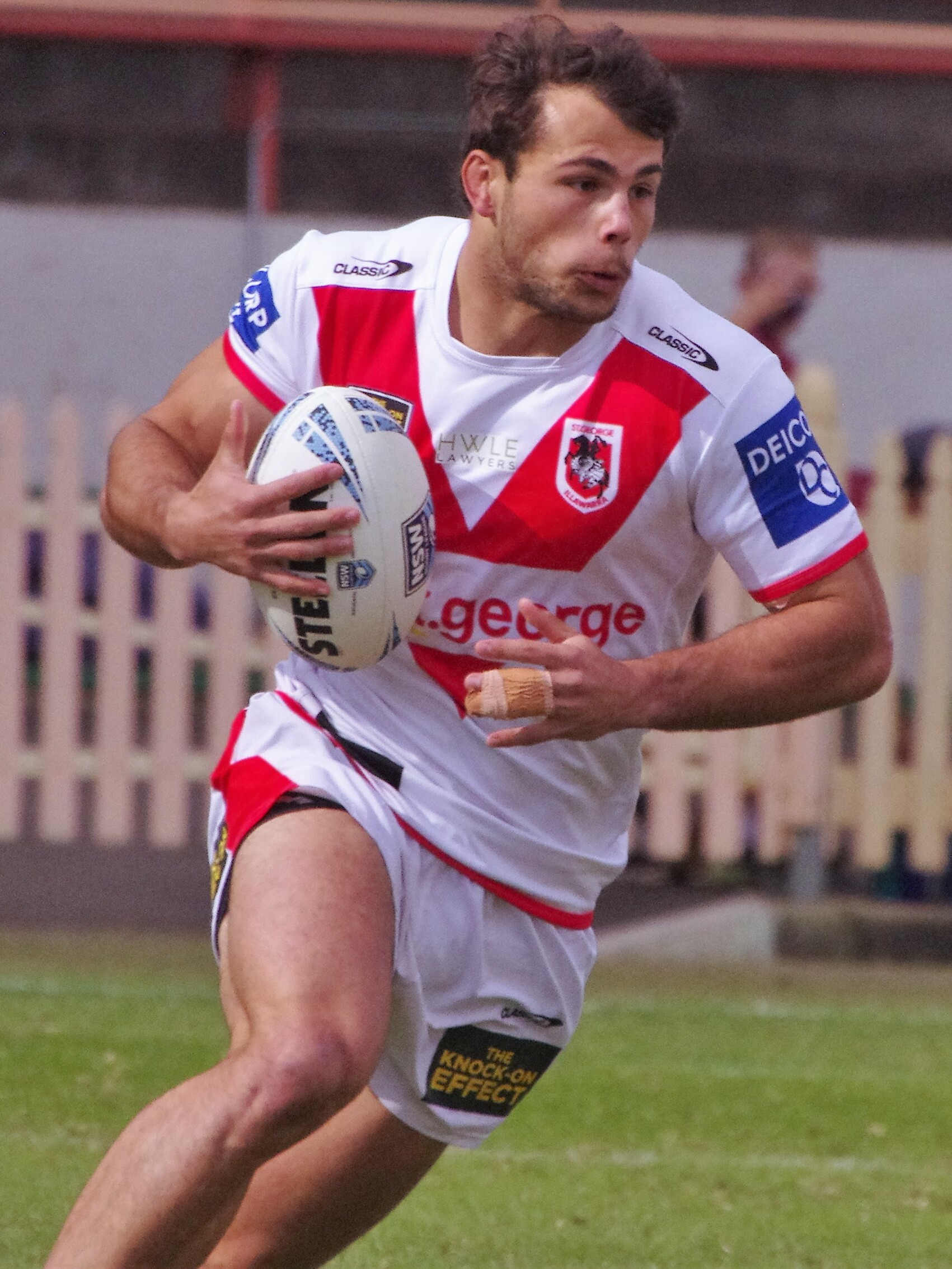

Personal information
- Full name: Bailey Antrobus
- Born: 18 February 2000 (age 25) Wollongong, New South Wales, Australia
- Height: 6 ft 0 in (1.84 m)
- Weight: 16 st 10 lb (106 kg)

Playing information
- Position: Second-row, Centre, Loose forward
Club
Years	Team	Pld	T	G	FG	P
2022–25	York Knights	40	7	0	0	28
2026–	Newcastle Thunder	1	0	0	0	0
	Total	41	7	0	0	28
Representative
Years	Team	Pld	T	G	FG	P
2022–	Wales	5	0	0	0	0
- Source: As of 13 February 2026

Bailey Antrobus (born 18 February 2000) is a Wales international rugby league footballer who plays as a second-row and centre for the Newcastle Thunder in the Championship.

== Background ==
Antrobus was born in Wollongong, New South Wales, Australia. He is of Welsh descent.

== Playing career ==
=== York Knights ===
Antrobus played for the St George Illawarra Dragons in trial games in 2021. On 13 May 2022, Antrobus signed a contract to join RFL Championship side York Knights. In August 2023, Antrobus suffered an ACL injury and missed the rest of the season. In October 2023, he signed a two-year deal to remain at York until 2025.

=== Newcastle Thunder ===
On 10 December 2025 it was reported that he had signed for Newcastle Thunder in the RFL Championship

=== International career ===
He made his debut in June 2022 against France at the Stadium Municipal d'Albi in Albi. In 2022 Antrobus was named in the Wales squad for the 2021 Rugby League World Cup. Antrobus played in all three group stage games as Wales were eliminated after losing all their matches. He played and co captained Wales against Jamaica in the second row coming up with a 24-16 win at home in Neath.
