= Brendan O'Hagan =

Ireland international rugby league footballer

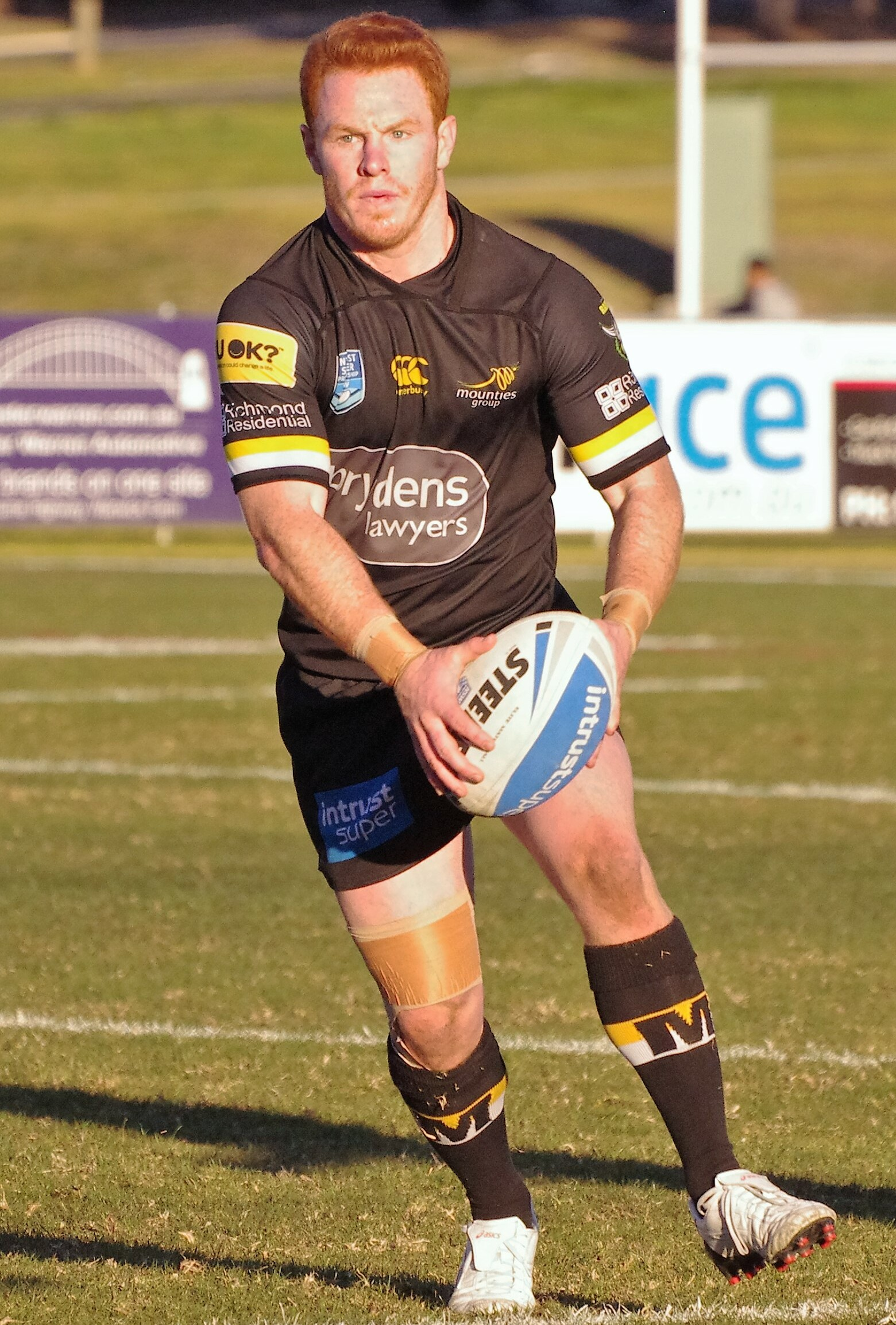

Personal information
- Full name: Brendan O'Hagan
- Born: 30 October 1998 (age 27) Gosford, New South Wales, Australia
- Height: 5 ft 8 in (1.72 m)
- Weight: 13 st 1 lb (83 kg)

Playing information
- Position: Stand-off, Scrum-half, Hooker
Club
Years	Team	Pld	T	G	FG	P
2021–22	York City Knights (Note: York City Knights were renamed as York Knights in October 2022, O'Hagan left in January 2023 without playing any matches under the new team name)	27	12	0	1	49
2023	Wynnum Manly Seagulls	15	0	0	0	0
2024–	The Entrance Tigers	0	0	0	0	0
	Total	42	12	0	1	49
Representative
Years	Team	Pld	T	G	FG	P
2022–	Ireland	5	2	0	0	8
- Source: As of 2 November 2025

Brendan O'Hagan (born 30 October 1998) is an Ireland international rugby league footballer who plays as a stand-off, scrum-half and hooker for The Entrance Tigers in the Central Coast League.

== Background ==
O'Hagan was born in Gosford, New South Wales, Australia. He is of Irish descent.

== Playing career ==
=== Club career ===
O'Hagan played for the Mount Pritchard Mounties in the NSW Cup.

He joined York City Knights ahead of the 2021 season. During his time with the club he made 27 appearances, scored 12 tries and one field goal.

In January 2023, the York granted O'Hagan a release from his contract to return to Australia where he joined the Wynnum Manly Seagulls for the 2023 Queensland Cup season. O'Hagan made 15 appearances for the Seagulls. He was released at the end of his contract and signed for The Entrance Tigers in the Newcastle Rugby League.

=== International career ===
In 2022 O'Hagan was named in the Ireland squad for the 2021 Rugby League World Cup, making his debut, and scoring a try, against Jamaica on 16 October 2022.
