= Will Oakes =

Scotland international rugby league footballer

Personal information
- Full name: William Oakes
- Born: 27 February 1999 (age 27) Halifax, West Yorkshire, England
- Height: 6 ft 0 in (1.83 m)
- Weight: 14 st 7 lb (92 kg)

Playing information
- Position: Wing
Club
Years	Team	Pld	T	G	FG	P
2016–20	Hull Kingston Rovers	24	10	0	0	40
2018(DR)	→ York City Knights	10	6	0	0	24
2019(loan)	→ York City Knights	14	8	0	0	32
2020(loan)	→ Dewsbury Rams	6	2	0	0	8
2021	Dewsbury Rams	14	4	0	0	16
2022–23	York City Knights	9	3	0	0	12
2024	Bradford Bulls	0	0	0	0	0
2025	Batley Bulldogs	0	0	0	0	0
2025–	Sheffield Eagles	4	1	0	0	4
2026(loan)	→ Batley Bulldogs	4	0	0	0	0
	Total	85	34	0	0	136
Representative
Years	Team	Pld	T	G	FG	P
2017–21	Scotland	6	4	0	0	16
- Source: As of 10 August 2025

William Oakes (born 27 February 1999) is a Scotland International rugby league footballer who plays on the wing for the Sheffield Eagles in the Betfred Championship.

He played for Hull Kingston Rovers in the Super League and spent time on loan from Hull KR at the York City Knights in League 1 and in the Championship, as well as a loan at Dewsbury Rams in the second tier.

== Background ==
Oakes was born in Halifax, West Yorkshire, England.

== Playing career ==
=== Early career ===
Oakes started playing rugby league for King Cross Park Junior R.L.F.C., at only just 6-years-old.

He played at King Cross Park until he was 13-years-old. He played every position possible whilst there and he won the 'Player of the Year' and 'Players' Player of the Year' Awards six-times each.

At the age of 13, Oakes decided that he wanted to step-up to the top division of the Yorkshire League and he then moved to the Eastmoor Dragons.

During his time at Eastmoor he won several individual accolades including the 'Players' Player' and 'Man of Steel' Awards. He played mostly at fullback for Eastmoor and he was the top-scorer each season he spent there. Oakes even scored 9 tries in a Yorkshire Cup quarter-final against Dewbury Moor.

At 14-years-old, Oakes was scouted into the Wakefield Trinity Wildcats' Scholarship Academy, this is where he began playing on the wing.

He 'hit the ground running' and he was selected to play at under-16's level in his first year. He scored a myriad of tries and he showed that he was an established goal-kicker. He also finished the season as top scorer and he also won the 'Players' Player of the Year' Award.

In his second year with the Wakefield Trinity Wildcats' Scholarship Academy, he experienced the same success as he did in his first year and Oakes regularly scored hat-tricks. The Wakefield Trinity Wildcats' Scholarship Academy subsequently went the season unbeaten that year.

This success culminated in Will Oakes being selected in the England Youth Rugby League Team, he represented England in tests against France that year.

At the end of his Wakefield Trinity Wildcats' Scholarship, he was offered full-time professional contracts with no fewer than nine Super League clubs.

=== Senior career ===
==== Hull Kingston Rovers (2016 - 2020) ====
Oakes decided that he liked the vision that Hull Kingston Rovers offered him, Oakes then decided that he would join them on a first-team contract at only just the age of 16.

Oakes played for the City of Hull Academy in their inaugural year. He again showed that he was a lethal finisher and he finished the season as top points scorer, even though he missed half of the season due to international commitments.

He was also called up to Hull Kingston Rovers' first-team, where he enjoyed his début on 28 March 2016, the game against the Wigan Warriors ended in a 16-30 defeat at the DW Stadium. Oakes enjoyed his début for Hull Kingston Rovers the month after his seventeenth birthday.

He was in and around the first-team several times, but this was to be his only first-grade appearance in the 2016 rugby league season.

Oakes suffered relegation from the Super League with Hull Kingston Rovers in the 2016 season, due to losing the Million Pound Game by the Salford Red Devils.

12-months later however, Oakes was part of Hull Kingston Rovers' side that won promotion back to the Super League, at the first time of asking following relegation the season prior.

It was revealed on 2 May 2018, that Oakes had signed a deal to keep him at Hull Kingston Rovers, until at least the end of the 2021 rugby league season.

==== Dual Registration (2018) ====
In 2018, Oakes made multiple appearances for the York City Knights from his parent-club Hull Kingston Rovers as part of a dual registration agreement.

==== York City Knights (Loan) ====
It was announced on 23 May 2019, that Oakes had joined the York City Knights on a one month loan deal with fellow Hull Kingston Rovers' teammate, Taioalo Vaivai.

==== Dewsbury Rams ====
On 6 November 2020 it was announced that Oakes would join the Dewsbury Rams on a permanent 1-year deal.

==== York City Knights ====
On 21 October 2021 it was reported that he had signed for York City Knights in the RFL Championship.

==== Bradford Bulls ====
On 27 September 2023 it was reported that he had signed for Bradford Bulls in the RFL Championship.

==== Batley Bulldogs ====
On 2 February 2025 it was reported that he had signed for Batley Bulldogs for 2025, after leaving Bradford Bulls without making a single first team appearance

=== Sheffield Eagles ===
On 10 August 2025 it was reported that he had signed for Sheffield Eagles in the RFL Championship

=== Representative career ===
==== England Academy (2016) ====
Oakes was selected as the youngest member of the England Academy squad that toured Australia in 2016, he represented them at test-level on this tour.

==== Scotland (2017 - present) ====
He made his Scotland International début during the 2017 Rugby League World Cup against Tonga on 29 October 2017, the Bravehearts lost the game 50-4.
