= Jack Teanby =

Scotland international rugby league footballer

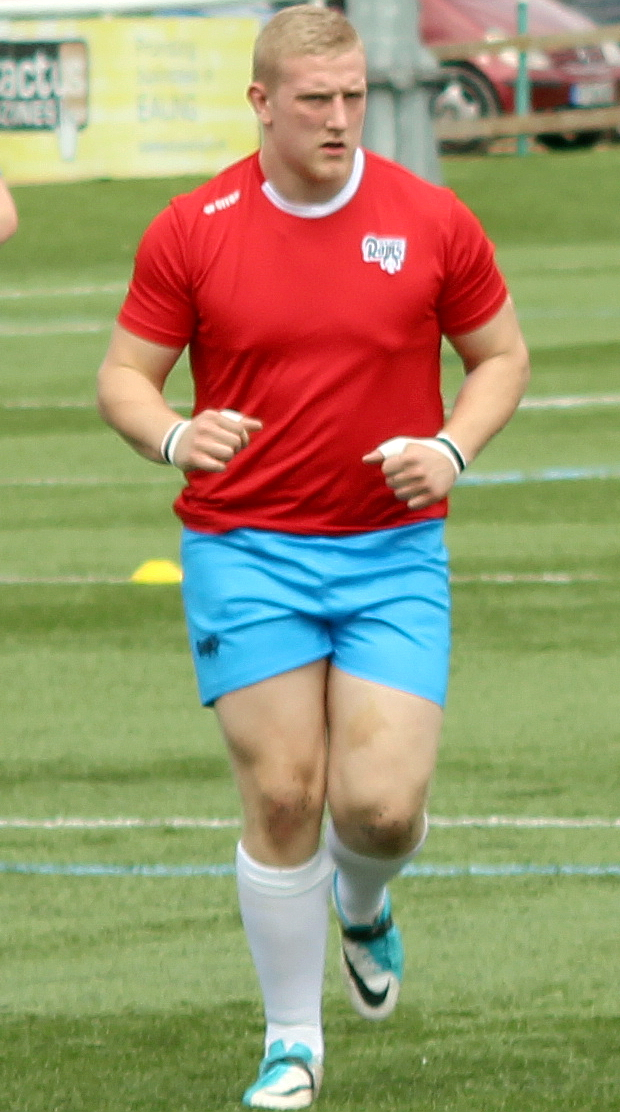

Personal information
- Born: 14 May 1996 (age 30) Leeds, West Yorkshire, England
- Height: 5 ft 10 in (1.77 m)
- Weight: 16 st 3 lb (103 kg)

Playing information
- Position: Prop
Club
Years	Team	Pld	T	G	FG	P
2016–18	Dewsbury Rams	77	7	0	0	28
2019–25	York Knights	145	13	0	0	52
2025(loan)	→ Keighley Cougars	2	2	0	0	8
2025–	Keighley Cougars	0	0	0	0	0
	Total	224	22	0	0	88
Representative
Years	Team	Pld	T	G	FG	P
2021–	Scotland	4	0	0	0	0
- Source: As of 11 June 2025

Jack Teanby (born 14 May 1996) is a Scotland international rugby league footballer who plays as a prop for Keighley Cougars in RFL League 1.

== Background ==
Teanby was born in Leeds, West Yorkshire, England.

== Career ==
=== Dewsbury Rams ===
Teanby signed for the Rams in 2016 playing 77 games in his three year tenure at the club.

=== York Knights ===
In October 2018 he signed a one-year deal to join the York Knights. He quickly established himself as a fan favourite, he help York reach the 1895 Cup final in 2021, starting in the close loss to Featherstone Rovers. In 2025 York Knights went on to beat Featherstone Rovers in narrow 4-5 final at Wembley. Jack did not feature in the final with him struggling to find game time in the 2025 season with York.

=== Keighley Cougars (loan) ===
On 21 May 2025 he joined Keighley Cougars on a 2-week loan. His debut came in a 6-30 loss against league leaders, the North Wales Crusaders. However the following week he helped Keighley get their first league win of the season with a 52-0 win over Newcastle Thunder at Blaydon RUFC, Teanby scored a brace of tries in the match.

=== Keighley Cougars ===
On 10 June 2025 Keighley Cougars confirmed that Teanby had signed permanently for the RFL League 1 club on a 2½-year deal.
