= Will Jubb =

English rugby league footballer

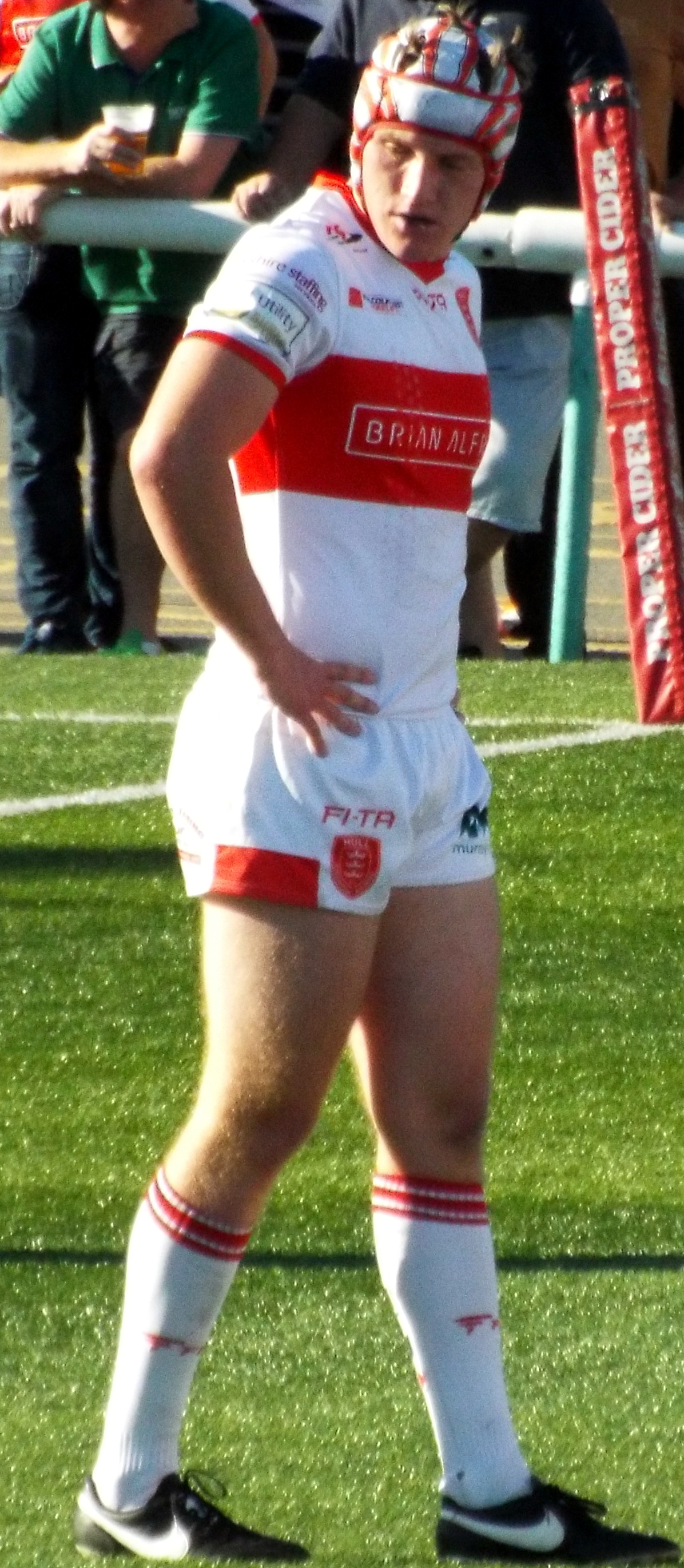

Personal information
- Full name: William Jubb
- Born: 17 September 1996 (age 29) England
- Height: 5 ft 8 in (1.72 m)
- Weight: 13 st 5 lb (85 kg)

Playing information
- Position: Hooker
Club
Years	Team	Pld	T	G	FG	P
2016–17	Hull Kingston Rovers	7	1	0	0	4
2017(loan)	→ York City Knights	16	5	0	0	20
2018–24	York Knights	104	19	0	0	76
2025	Featherstone Rovers	22	3	0	0	12
2026–	Goole Vikings	15	0	0	0	0
	Total	164	28	0	0	112
- Source: As of 11 May 2026

Will Jubb (born 17 September 1996) is an English professional rugby league footballer who plays as a hooker for the Goole Vikings in the RFL Championship.

He previously played for Hull Kingston Rovers in the Super League.

== Playing career ==
=== Hull Kingston Rovers ===
Jubb made his début for the Robins in their middle eights round 4 victory over the London Broncos, managing to score a try in the 58-18 win. He then played a further 3 games from the interchange bench against Leigh, Huddersfield and against Salford in the Million Pound Game which Rovers lost and which sealed their relegation to the second tier

=== York Knights ===
In December 2017 he signed a one-year deal with York, having played for them on dual-registration during the 2017 season.

=== Featherstone Rovers ===
On 19 Nov 2024 it was reported that he had signed for Featherstone Rovers in the RFL Championship on a 1-year deal.

=== Goole Vikings ===
On 22 January 2026 it was reported that he had signed for Goole Vikings in the RFL Championship

== Personal life ==
Ambassador for Club Wilber - York Based Children's club for children with sight problems. Part of the Wilberforce Trust
