= AJ Towse =

English rugby league player

Personal information
- Full name: Alwyn-Joshua Towse
- Born: 19 August 2003 (age 23) York, North Yorkshire, England
- Height: 6 ft 2 in (1.87 m)
- Weight: 15 st 2 lb (96 kg)

Playing information
- Position: Wing
Club
Years	Team	Pld	T	G	FG	P
2021–24	York Knights	67	35	0	0	140
2021(loan)	Coventry Bears	2	1	0	0	4
2021(loan)	Rochdale Hornets	1	0	0	0	0
2024(DR)	Newcastle Thunder	2	0	0	0	0
2025(loan)	Widnes Vikings	3	2	0	0	8
2025–2026	Leigh Leopards	8	6	0	0	24
	Total	83	44	0	0	176
- Source: As of 27 April 2026

AJ Towse (born 19 August 2003) is a professional rugby league footballer who plays as a winger for the Leigh Leopards in the Betfred SuperLeague.

He formerly played for York RLFC and started his career at amateur Club Heworth ARLFC as a Junior. Later he represented the North-East Universities 2021 and played in the Universities Origin game for the North in the same year.

He is also a freelance Web Designer and has a degree in Computer Science from York St. John University.

== Playing career ==
Towse was born in York and is a product of amateur club Heworth ARLFC, having played Rugby League from the age of 11 and latterly the York City Knights Excel Program, having represented them at U16's.

Having made his first Open-Age appearance in a pre-season friendly for York Knights vs Featherstone Rovers at the age of 16, he signed a 3 year contract for the seasons 2021 to 2023. He then went on to sign for a fourth year and the 2024 season

=== York City Knights 2021 ===
Towse made his professional debut in April 2021 in York's defeat by Wigan Warriors in the Challenge Cup 3rd Round.

Later that year he made a second appearance in the Knights' September win over London Broncos.

=== Coventry Bears and Rochdale Hornets 2021 (on-loan) ===
During 2021 Towse made 2 loan appearances in May 2021 for Coventry Bears, scoring 1 try, and one loan appearance in August for Rochdale Hornets.

=== Leeds Rhinos Reserves 2022 (on-loan) ===
Towse made one appearance on loan for Leeds Rhinos Reserves vs Wigan, before being recalled to play for the Knights.

=== York City Knights 2022 ===
2022 saw Towse appear 18 times for the Knights and scoring 8 tries.

He scored two tries in each of the matches against Newcastle Thunder, Whitehaven RLFC and London Broncos. However, his acrobatic try against Batley Bulldogs, broadcast live on Premier Sports, was particularly notable.

During the Rugby League World Cup, Towse also spent several days training with the New Zealand National team.

=== York Knights 2023 ===
During the 2023 season, Towse was the only player to appear in all 34 of the team's League and Cup matches. He scored 20 tries, including a hat-trick against London and helped the team reach the play-offs for the second consecutive season.

=== York Knights 2024 ===
Towse signed a further contract ahead of the 2024 season, ending with 13 appearances and 7 tries

=== Leigh Leopards 2025 ===
As announced in Oct 2024, Towse signed a 3 year contract to join the Leigh Leopards ahead of the 2025 season. He played 4 times, scoring 3 tries against Salford and Huddersfield

=== Widnes Vikings (loan) ===
On 21 May 2025 it was reported that he had signed for Widnes Vikings in the RFL Championship on loan

=== Leigh Leopards 2026 ===
So far, Towse played games against York, Huddersfield, Hull KR and Hull FC, scoring three tries.

== Honours ==
2021 – North East Universities

2021 – Universities Origin final.

2022 – Rugby League Betfred Championship Young Player of the Year nomination.

2022 – York City Knights Young Player of the Year.

2022 – York City Knights Try of the Year.

2023 – York Sport Awards Student Sportsperson of the Year.

2023 – York Knights Supporters Society Player of the year.

2023 – York Knights Young Player of the Year

2023 – York Knights Top Try Scorer.

2023 – Rugby League Betfred Championship Young Player of the Year nomination.

=== Professional Career record ===
Years	Team	Apps	Tries	Points
2021	York City Knights	2		
2021	Coventry Bears (loan)	2	1	4
2021	Rochdale Hornets (loan)	1		
2022	York City Knights	18	8	32
2023	York City Knights	34	20	80
2024	Newcastle Thunder	2		
2024	York Knights	13	7	28
2025	Widnes Vikings (loan)	3	2	8
2025	Leigh Leopards	4	3	12
2026	Leigh Leopards	4	3	12
Total		83	44	176
