= Jacob Ogden =

Jamaica international rugby league footballer

Jake Ogden
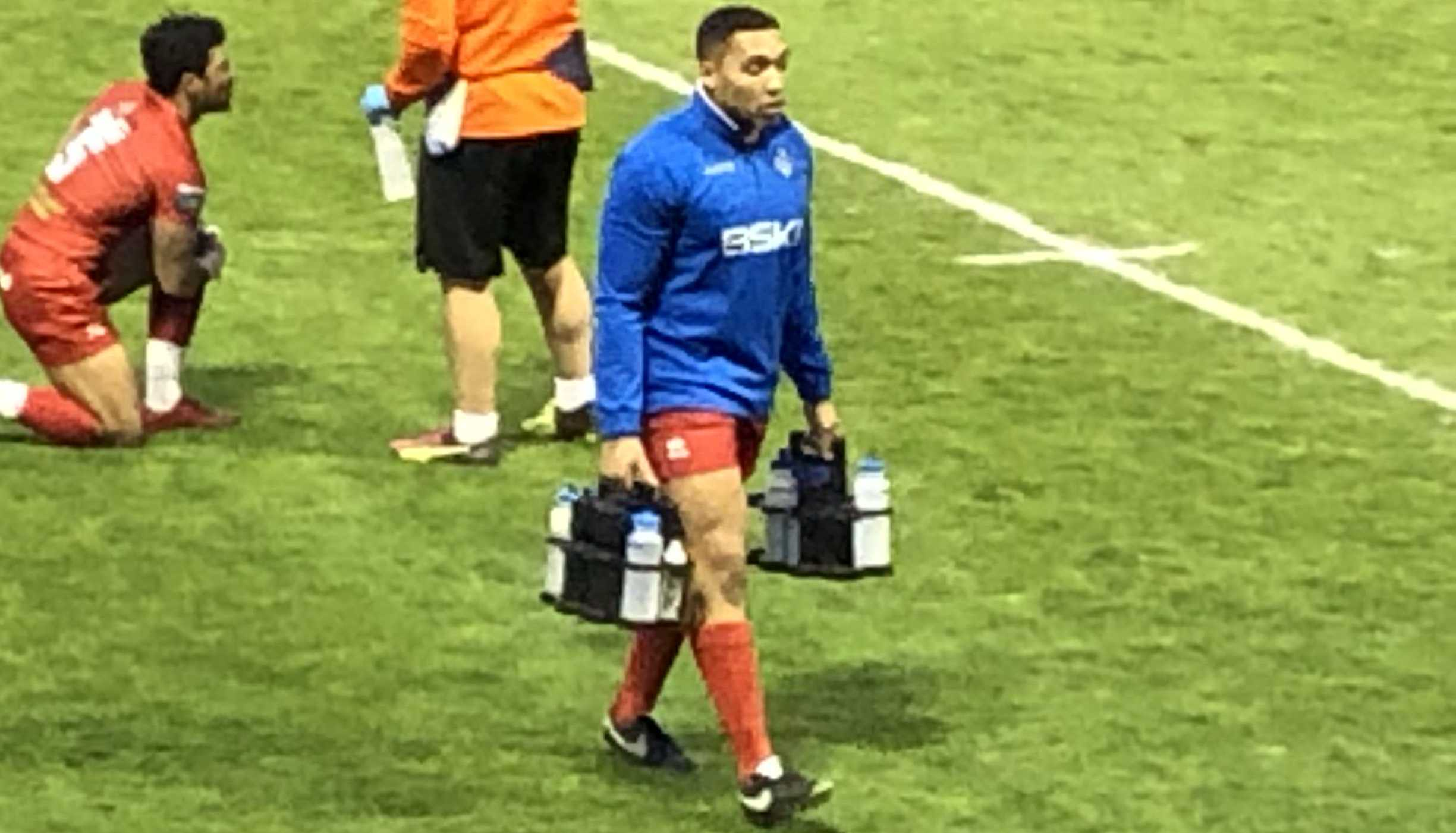

Personal information
- Full name: Jacob Ogden
- Born: 23 June 1998 (age 28) Northampton, Northamptonshire, England

Playing information
- Position: Centre, Wing
Club
Years	Team	Pld	T	G	FG	P
2017–21	London Broncos	12	4	0	0	16
2017(loan)	→ London Skolars	5	4	0	0	20
2018(loan)	→ London Skolars	3	1	0	0	4
2018(loan)	→ Coventry Bears	12	2	0	0	8
2019(loan)	→ London Skolars	5	1	0	0	4
2019(loan)	→ Sheffield Eagles	15	3	0	0	12
2022	York Knights	13	0	0	0	0
	Total	65	15	0	0	64
Representative
Years	Team	Pld	T	G	FG	P
2017–	Jamaica	6	2	0	0	8
- Source: As of 12 January 2023

Jacob Ogden (born 26 June 1998) is a Jamaica international rugby league footballer who last played as a centre for the York Knights in the RFL Championship.

He has spent time on loan from the Broncos at the London Skolars and the Coventry Bears in League 1, and the Sheffield Eagles in the Betfred Championship. He currently works at a job in Leeds as a co-worker at Trinity Academy Leeds secondary school.

== Background ==
Ogden was born in Northampton, Northamptonshire, England.

== Club career ==
=== London Broncos ===
In 2018 Ogden made his professional debut for the London Broncos against Workington Town in the Challenge Cup.

=== York RLFC ===
On 15 October 2021, it was reported that he had signed for York RLFC in the RFL Championship

== International ==
Jacob made his international debut for Jamaica in the 34-12 defeat to France on 13 Oct 2017 playing on left wing / #5; he scored one try in this game, plus being sin-binned.

== Personal life ==
Ogden is married to Wigan Warriors forward, Kelsey Gentles. They have one daughter.
