= James Ford (rugby league) =

English RL coach and former rugby league footballer

Personal information
- Full name: James Ford
- Born: 29 September 1982 (age 44) Yorkshire, England

Playing information
- Position: Fullback, Wing, Centre
Club
Years	Team	Pld	T	G	FG	P
2003–05	Featherstone Rovers	34	6	0	0	24
2005–08	Sheffield Eagles	78	49	0	0	196
2009	Castleford Tigers	10	2	0	0	8
2010–11	Widnes Vikings	16	6	0	0	24
2011–14	York City Knights	57	23	0	0	92
	Total	195	86	0	0	344

Coaching information
Club
Years	Team	Gms	W	D	L	W%
2015–22	York City Knights	91	64	1	16	70
2023–25	Featherstone Rovers	45	28	0	17	62
2026–	Batley Bulldogs	28	12	0	16	43
	Total	164	104	1	49	63
- Source: As of 3 November 2026

James Ford (born 29 September 1982) is an English professional rugby league coach who is the head coach of the Batley Bulldogs in the Betfred Championship.

== Playing career ==
As a player Ford played in the Super League for Castleford Tigers and the Widnes Vikings, as a fullback but also played at centre, and on the wing. Ford signed initially for the Featherstone Rovers as a youth in 1998, before moving on to the Sheffield Eagles, and then Castleford in 2008. Ford made his first-grade début whilst playing for the Castleford Tigers in Super League in a 28–6 win away to the Warrington Wolves in 2009's Super League XIV, and he went on to make a total of eight appearances, scoring once. In late 2009, he left the club for Widnes. During his playing and early coaching career, he was a lecturer at Wakefield College.

== Coaching ==
=== York Knights ===
After retiring as a player in 2014, Ford took over as head coach at York, and became the club's first ever full-time coach in 2018. In November 2021, he extended his contract with the club until the end of 2024. In October 2022 Ford resigned from York to become assistant coach at Super League club Wakefield Trinity.

=== Featherstone Rovers ===
On 16 May 2023 he was announced as the new Director of Rugby at Featherstone Rovers. He was later announced on 18 Aug 2023 to take over as head coach following the sacking of Sean Long.

On 26 February 2025 it was reported that he had left Featherstone Rovers after just two games of the 2025 season.

=== Batley Bulldogs ===
On 25 August 2025 it was reported that he would take over as head coach for 2026, once John Kear retired at the end of the 2025 season.
